= 2023 Africa Cup of Nations knockout stage =

The knockout stage of the 2023 Africa Cup of Nations was the second and final stage of the competition, following the group stage. It began on 27 January with the round of 16 and ended on 11 February 2024 with the final held at the Alassane Ouattara Stadium in Abidjan. A total of sixteen teams (the top two teams from each group, along with the four best third-placed teams) advanced to the knockout stage to compete in a single-elimination style tournament.

All match times are local, GMT (UTC+0).

== Format ==
In the knockout stage, except for the third place play-off, if a match was level at the end of 90 minutes of normal playing time, extra time was played (two periods of 15 minutes each). If still tied after extra time, the match was decided by a penalty shoot-out to determine the winner. In the third place play-off, if the score remained level after 90 minutes, the match would go directly to a penalty shoot-out, without any extra time being played.

== Qualified teams ==
The top two placed teams from each of the six groups, plus the four best-placed third teams, qualified for the knockout stage.

Group	Winners	Runners-up	Third-placed teams (Best four qualified)
A	Equatorial Guinea	Nigeria	Ivory Coast
B	Cape Verde	Egypt	—N/a
C	Senegal	Cameroon	Guinea
D	Angola	Burkina Faso	Mauritania
E	Mali	South Africa	Namibia
F	Morocco	DR Congo	—N/a

== Bracket ==
Round of 16
27 January – Abidjan (H.B)
Nigeria	2
Cameroon	0
27 January – Bouaké
Angola	3
Namibia	0
29 January – Abidjan (H.B)
Cape Verde	1
Mauritania	0
30 January – San Pédro
Morocco	0
South Africa	2
30 January – Korhogo
Mali	2
Burkina Faso	1
29 January – Yamoussoukro
Senegal	1 (4)
Ivory Coast (p)	1 (5)
28 January – San Pédro
Egypt	1 (7)
DR Congo (p)	1 (8)
28 January – Abidjan (Ouattara)
Equatorial Guinea	0
Guinea	1

Quarter-finals
2 February – Abidjan (H.B)
Nigeria	1
Angola	0
3 February – Yamoussoukro
Cape Verde	0 (1)
South Africa (p)	0 (2)
3 February – Bouaké
Mali	1
Ivory Coast (a.e.t.)	2
2 February – Abidjan (Ouattara)
DR Congo	3
Guinea	1

Semi-finals
7 February – Bouaké
Nigeria (p)	1 (4)
South Africa	1 (2)
7 February – Abidjan (Ouattara)
Ivory Coast	1
DR Congo	0

Final
11 February – Abidjan (Ouattara)
Nigeria	1
Ivory Coast	2
Third place play-off
10 February – Abidjan (H.B)
South Africa (p)	0 (6)
DR Congo	0 (5)

== Round of 16 ==
=== Angola vs Namibia ===
Angola and Namibia met for the 13th time, and this match was their first competitive meeting at the Africa Cup of Nations since 1998, where Angola overcame a two-goal deficit to secure a 3-3 draw in Bobo-Dioulasso, Burkina Faso.

The match was thought to have turned worse for Angola when Neblú received a red card in the 17th minute due to a handball outside the box. However, the Angolans opened the scoring, when Gelson Dala nicely chipped over from a counterattack at the 38th minute with assists for Fredy. The situation turned increasingly more favorable for Angola when Namibia was reduced to ten after Lubeni Haukongo got a second yellow in the 40th minute; a set-piece two minutes later saw Dala headed home for a second. Mabululu sealed the match when he curled home despite frantic efforts by Namibian defenders.

This win was Angola's first-ever in the knockout stage of the Africa Cup of Nations, while Namibia remained winless over Angola (D6, L7).

27 January 2024
17:00

Angola	3–0	Namibia
Dala 38', 42'; Mabululu 66'	Report

Stade de la Paix, Bouaké
Attendance: 28,663
Referee: Dahane Beida (Mauritania)

Angola	Namibia

GK	22	Neblú	(red card) 17'
RB	21	Eddie Afonso
CB	6	Gaspar
CB	3	Jonathan Buatu
LB	13	Tó Carneiro
CM	20	Estrela		(substituted off) 20'
CM	23	Show
CM	16	Fredy (c)		(substituted off) 70'
RW	7	Gilberto		(substituted off) 70'
CF	19	Mabululu		(substituted off) 84'
LW	10	Gelson Dala		(substituted off) 84'
Substitutions:
GK	1	Antonio Dominique		(substituted on) 20'
FW	9	Zini		(substituted on) 70'
MF	4	Manuel Keliano		(substituted on) 70'
FW	18	Jérémie Bela		(substituted on) 84'
FW	15	Zito Luvumbo		(substituted on) 84'
Manager:
(Portugal) Pedro Gonçalves

GK	1	Lloyd Kazapua
RB	20	Ivan Kamberipa
CB	12	Kennedy Amutenya		(substituted off) 60'
CB	21	Lubeni Haukongo	(yellow card) 14' (yellow-red card) 40'
LB	4	Riaan Hanamub
RM	9	Bethuel Muzeu		(substituted off) 70'
CM	6	Ngero Katua		(substituted off) 60'
CM	18	Aprocius Petrus
LM	10	Prins Tjiueza		(substituted off) 23'
SS	7	Deon Hotto
CF	13	Peter Shalulile (c)
Substitutions:
FW	11	Absalom Iimbondi	(yellow card) 63'	(substituted on) 23'
MF	19	Petrus Shitembi		(substituted on) 60'
DF	3	Ananias Gebhardt		(substituted on) 60'
MF	8	Uetuuru Kambato		(substituted on) 70'
Manager:
Collin Benjamin

Man of the Match:
Gelson Dala (Angola)

Assistant referees:
Seydou Tiama (Burkina Faso)
Modibo Samake (Mali)
Fourth official:
Boubou Traoré (Mali)
Video assistant referee:
Mahmoud Ashour (Egypt)
Assistant video assistant referees:
Maria Rivet (Mauritius)
Mahmoud El-Regal (Egypt)

=== Nigeria vs Cameroon ===
Nigeria and Cameroon met for the 26th time, and this was the eighth time the nations were meeting in the Africa Cup of Nations, including a previous encounter in the Ivory Coast and two meetings at the 1988 Africa Cup of Nations.

Although Nigeria started slowly, they immediately found the back of the net as Semi Ajayi tapped the ball in from a close range at the ninth minute, only to be disallowed for offside. This offside goal, instead, spurred the Super Eagles on and ultimately, they would get the goal needed when Oumar Gonzalez’s mis-timed touch allowed Victor Osimhen to seize on the loose ball, race forward and feed through Ademola Lookman, whose shot was fumbled into the net by Fabrice Ondoa at the 36th minute. Despite efforts by the Cameroonians to turn around, Nigeria ultimately triumphed at the 90th minute when Lookman raced onto Calvin Bassey’s low cross from the left and powerfully volleyed into the net.

27 January 2024
20:00

Nigeria	2–0	Cameroon
Lookman 36', 90'	Report

Felix Houphouet Boigny Stadium, Abidjan
Attendance: 22,085
Referee: Redouane Jiyed (Morocco)

Nigeria	Cameroon

GK	23	Stanley Nwabili		(substituted off) 80'
CB	6	Semi Ajayi
CB	5	William Troost-Ekong (c)
CB	21	Calvin Bassey
RM	2	Ola Aina	(yellow card) 90+5'
CM	8	Frank Onyeka
CM	17	Alex Iwobi
LM	3	Zaidu Sanusi		(substituted off) 80'
RW	15	Moses Simon	(yellow card) 87'	(substituted off) 90+9'
CF	9	Victor Osimhen		(substituted off) 90+9'
LW	18	Ademola Lookman
Substitutions:
GK	1	Francis Uzoho		(substituted on) 80'
DF	22	Kenneth Omeruo		(substituted on) 80'
FW	19	Paul Onuachu		(substituted on) 90+9'
DF	12	Bright Osayi-Samuel		(substituted on) 90+9'
Manager:
(Portugal) José Peseiro

GK	1	Fabrice Ondoa
CB	21	Jean-Charles Castelletto
CB	15	Oumar Gonzalez		(substituted off) 78'
CB	4	Christopher Wooh	(yellow card) 53'
RWB	11	Georges-Kévin Nkoudou	(yellow card) 72'
LWB	5	Nouhou Tolo
CM	22	Olivier Ntcham
CM	8	André-Frank Zambo Anguissa (c)
CM	3	Moumi Ngamaleu		(substituted off) 86'
CF	9	Frank Magri
CF	12	Karl Toko Ekambi		(substituted off) 90+6'
Substitutions:
FW	10	Vincent Aboubakar		(substituted on) 78'
DF	26	Enzo Tchato		(substituted on) 86'
FW	19	Faris Moumbagna		(substituted on) 90+6'
Manager:
Rigobert Song

Man of the Match:
Ademola Lookman (Nigeria)

Assistant referees:
Lahsen Azgaou (Morocco)
Zakaria Brinsi (Morocco)
Fourth official:
Jalal Jayed (Morocco)
Video assistant referee:
Samir Guezzaz (Morocco)
Assistant video assistant referees:
Haythem Guirat (Tunisia)
Khalil Hassani (Tunisia)

=== Equatorial Guinea vs Guinea ===
This was the first time the two nations met for an international match.

After a dull first half with little chances, the second half was filled with drama. In the 55th minute, Federico Bikoro's high challenge on Mohamed Bayo proved to be disastrous for the Equatoguineans as he was given a red, reducing Equatorial Guinea to ten men. Ten minutes later, however, it was Equatorial Guinea's turn for a chance to score the opener when Iban Salvador was fouled in Guinea's penalty area, but from the spot, Emilio Nsue instead had his shot hit the left post. This ultimately proved to be a disaster for Equatorial Guinea, when at the last minute of injury time, Bayo turned hero for the Guineans with a terrific header to secure Guinea the win at the death after a cross from the right flank.

With this result, it was the worst-ever AFCON finish in the history for Equatorial Guinea, as they failed to advance past the last sixteen.

28 January 2024
17:00

Equatorial Guinea	0–1	Guinea
	Report	Bayo 90+8'

Alassane Ouattara Stadium, Abidjan
Attendance: 36,340
Referee: Omar Artan (Somalia)

Equatorial Guinea	Guinea

GK	1	Jesús Owono
RB	15	Carlos Akapo
CB	21	Esteban Obiang
CB	16	Saúl Coco
LB	11	Basilio Ndong
DM	4	Federico Bikoro	(red card) 55'
RM	22	Pablo Ganet
CM	6	Iban Salvador
CM	8	Jannick Buyla		(substituted off) 85'
LM	7	José Machín
CF	10	Emilio Nsue (c)
Substitutions:
FW	19	Luis Nlavo		(substituted on) 85'
Manager:
Juan Micha

GK	22	Ibrahim Koné
RB	3	Issiaga Sylla (c)
CB	17	Julian Jeanvier	(yellow card) 41'
CB	5	Mouctar Diakhaby
LB	12	Ibrahim Diakité
CM	6	Amadou Diawara
CM	20	Mory Konaté		(substituted off) 79'
CM	7	Morgan Guilavogui		(substituted off) 60'
RW	18	Aguibou Camara
CF	11	Mohamed Bayo
LW	21	Sekou Sylla		(substituted off) 79'
Substitutions:
FW	9	Serhou Guirassy		(substituted on) 60'
MF	8	Naby Keïta		(substituted on) 79'
FW	19	François Kamano		(substituted on) 79'
Manager:
Kaba Diawara

Man of the Match:
Ibrahim Diakité (Guinea)

Assistant referees:
Gilbert Cheruiyot (Kenya)
Stephen Yiembe (Kenya)
Fourth official:
Bamlak Tessema Weyesa (Ethiopia)
Video assistant referee:
Lahlou Benbraham (Algeria)
Assistant video assistant referees:
Akhona Makalima (South Africa)
Djibril Camara (Senegal)

=== Egypt vs DR Congo ===
This was the fifth meeting between both sides in the AFCON, with the latest encounter being in 2019, when Egypt managed to get a 2–0 win in the group stage.

Egypt were close to break the deadlock early, with Ahmed Hegazi narrowly missing a header in the eighth minute. DR Congo appeared to be more dangerous throughout the match, and eventually converted a chance in the 37th minute, when Yoane Wissa received a throw-in played quickly and had his deflected shot turned in by Meschak Elia, amid confusion of the Egyptian players, however, the lead lasted 10 minutes only, as Mostafa Mohamed scored a penalty that was confirmed by VAR following a foul by Dylan Batubinsika on Hegazi. After a slow and uneventful second half that saw only one serious attack missed by Mahmoud Hamada for Egypt, the match went to extra time for the first time in the 2023 edition, and witnessed Egypt's Mohamed Hamdy being sent off in the 97th minute after receiving two yellow cards. The second half of extra time saw Simon Banza missing a great chance for DR Congo that almost secured the victory for them, but the final score resulted in the first penalty shoot-out of the 2023 AFCON. It was DR Congo who managed to win the shoot-out, winning 8–7 with goalkeeper Lionel Mpasi scoring the winning penalty following his Egyptian counterpart Mohamed Abou Gabal's failed attempt, causing another upset in the tournament.

28 January 2024
20:00

Egypt	1–1 (a.e.t.)	DR Congo
Mohamed 45+1' (pen.)	Report	Elia 37'
Penalties
Abdelmonem (penalty scored); Mohamed (penalty missed); Marmoush (penalty scored); Kamal (penalty scored); Hany (penalty scored); Hegazi (penalty scored); M. Fathi (penalty scored); Hamada (penalty scored); Abou Gabal (penalty missed)	7–8	(penalty scored) Moutoussamy; (penalty missed) Masuaku; (penalty scored) Dianagana; (penalty scored) Silas; (penalty scored) Tshibola; (penalty scored) Kalulu; (penalty scored) Mbemba; (penalty scored) Inonga Baka; (penalty scored) Mpasi

Laurent Pokou Stadium, San Pédro
Attendance: 12,342
Referee: Abongile Tom (South Africa)

Egypt	DR Congo

GK	23	Mohamed Abou Gabal
RB	3	Mohamed Hany
CB	24	Mohamed Abdelmonem
CB	6	Ahmed Hegazi (c)
LB	13	Ahmed Fatouh		(substituted off) 46'
CM	17	Mohamed Elneny		(substituted off) 112'
CM	14	Marwan Attia	(yellow card) 80'	(substituted off) 83'
CM	5	Hamdy Fathy	(yellow card) 58'	(substituted off) 100'
RW	25	Zizo		(substituted off) 90'
LW	7	Trézéguet		(substituted off) 83'
CF	19	Mostafa Mohamed
Substitutions:
DF	12	Mohamed Hamdy	(yellow card) 66' (yellow-red card) 97'	(substituted on) 46'
MF	20	Mahmoud Hamada		(substituted on) 83'
FW	22	Omar Marmoush		(substituted on) 83'
FW	18	Mostafa Fathi		(substituted on) 90'
DF	4	Omar Kamal		(substituted on) 100'
MF	27	Mohanad Lasheen		(substituted on) 112'
Manager:
(Portugal) Rui Vitória

GK	1	Lionel Mpasi
RB	24	Gédéon Kalulu
CB	22	Chancel Mbemba (c)	(yellow card) 115'
CB	5	Dylan Batubinsika	(yellow card) 45'	(substituted off) 65'
LB	26	Arthur Masuaku
CM	10	Théo Bongonda	(yellow card) 102'
CM	8	Samuel Moutoussamy
CM	18	Charles Pickel		(substituted off) 79'
RW	13	Meschak Elia		(substituted off) 105+2'
LW	20	Yoane Wissa		(substituted off) 88'
CF	17	Cédric Bakambu		(substituted off) 65'
Substitutions:
FW	23	Simon Banza		(substituted on) 88'
DF	2	Henock Inonga Baka		(substituted on) 65'
MF	6	Aaron Tshibola		(substituted on) 88'
FW	11	Silas		(substituted on) 65'
MF	7	Grady Diangana		(substituted on) 105+2'
Manager:
(France) Sébastien Desabre

Man of the Match:
Lionel Mpasi (DR Congo)

Assistant referees:
Souru Phatsoane (Lesotho)
Ivanildo Lopes (Angola)
Fourth official:
Ahmed Heerallal (Mauritius)
Video assistant referee:
Daniel Nii Laryea (Ghana)
Assistant video assistant referees:
Issa Sy (Senegal)
Diana Chikotesha (Zambia)

=== Cape Verde vs Mauritania ===
It was the first time Cape Verde faced Mauritania in an AFCON match.

In a rather dull affair, which Mauritania were largely on the defence against Cape Verde, a howling header by Yassine Cheikh El Welly resulted in Benchimol intercept right on Mauritania's box, forcing Babacar Niasse to commit a foul at the 86th minute; this ended up giving Cape Verde's the decisive penalty, and Ryan Mendes didn't miss it two minutes later to secure Cape Verde's progression to the quarter-finals.

This result meant Cape Verde won their first ever AFCON knockout stage match, while on personal record, it was the second consecutive knockout stage defeat for Amir Abdou as coach, as he previously lost to Cameroon as coach of Comoros at the same last sixteen back in the 2021 edition.

29 January 2024
17:00

Cape Verde	1–0	Mauritania
Mendes 88' (pen.)	Report

Felix Houphouet Boigny Stadium, Abidjan
Attendance: 16,088
Referee: Mohamed Adel (Egypt)

Cape Verde	Mauritania

GK	1	Vozinha
RB	23	Steven Moreira		(substituted off) 90+5'
CB	5	Logan Costa
CB	4	Pico
LB	8	João Paulo
RM	10	Jamiro Monteiro
CM	26	Kevin Pina	(yellow card) 11'
LM	14	Deroy Duarte		(substituted off) 71'
RF	20	Ryan Mendes (c)
CF	21	Bebé		(substituted off) 72'
LF	7	Jovane Cabral		(substituted off) 85'
Substitutions:
MF	18	Kenny Rocha		(substituted on) 71'
FW	11	Garry Rodrigues		(substituted on) 72'
FW	9	Gilson Tavares		(substituted on) 85'
FW	17	Willy Semedo		(substituted on) 90+5'
Manager:
Bubista

GK	16	Babacar Niasse	(yellow card) 87'
RB	20	Ibrahima Keita		(substituted off) 80'
CB	21	Hassan Houbeib
CB	5	Lamine Ba
LB	2	Khadim Diaw
RM	23	Sidi Bouna Amar		(substituted off) 66'
CM	8	Mouhsine Bodda (c)
CM	4	Omaré Gassama		(substituted off) 35'
LM	9	Hemeya Tanjy		(substituted off) 66'
SS	19	Aboubakary Koita
CF	11	Souleymane Anne		(substituted off) 80'
Substitutions:
MF	6	Guessouma Fofana		(substituted on) 35'
FW	25	Pape Ibnou Ba		(substituted on) 66'
FW	27	Aboubakar Kamara		(substituted on) 66'
FW	17	Yassine El Welly		(substituted on) 80'
MF	7	El Hadji Ba		(substituted on) 80'
Manager:
(France) Amir Abdou

Man of the Match:
Jamiro Monteiro (Cape Verde)

Assistant referees:
Ahmed Ibrahim (Egypt)
Nouho Ouattara (Ivory Coast)
Fourth official:
Pacifique Ndabihawenimana (Burundi)
Video assistant referee:
Maria Rivet (Mauritius)
Assistant video assistant referees:
Mahmoud Ashour (Egypt)
Jerson dos Santos (Angola)

=== Senegal vs Ivory Coast ===
This was their first AFCON meeting since 1986, in which Ivory Coast won 1–0. However, their most recent competitive meetings happened during the 2014 FIFA World Cup qualification, which Ivory Coast also won to qualify for the main tournament.

Senegal got off to a dream start when from a fast attack, Sadio Mané latched on to Ismail Jakobs’ throw-in and cut it back from the byline for Habib Diallo, who took the ball on his chest before swivelling and smashing it high into the roof of Yahia Fofana’s net right after four minutes. However, wasteful opportunities later on, combined with the Ivorian regrouping, proved to be a major challenge for the Senegalese and, after wasting numerous opportunities to put the match to bed, Senegal were punished at the 82nd minute when a Nicolas Pépé's failed lob ended up resulting in Édouard Mendy committed a foul on the box; VAR later confirmed a penalty and Franck Kessié converted neatly to equalise. Neither could break through thereafter and both were forced to settle on penalties. While the Ivorians ended up converting all penalties in success, Senegal's Moussa Niakhaté's shot instead hit the right post, to end any hope of defending the African title for the Senegalese as the Ivorians marched on.

This result meant Senegal remain unable to beat Ivory Coast in any competitive fixture in their history (2D, 5L).

29 January 2024
20:00

Senegal	1–1 (a.e.t.)	Ivory Coast
H. Diallo 4'	Report	Kessié 86' (pen.)
Penalties
Koulibaly (penalty scored); P. Sarr (penalty scored); Niakhaté (penalty missed); Dieng (penalty scored); Mané (penalty scored)	4–5	(penalty scored) Pépé; (penalty scored) Kouamé; (penalty scored) Haller; (penalty scored) Aurier; (penalty scored) Kessié

Charles Konan Banny Stadium, Yamoussoukro
Attendance: 19,948
Referee: Pierre Atcho (Gabon)

Senegal	Ivory Coast

GK	16	Édouard Mendy	(yellow card) 84'
CB	22	Abdou Diallo		(substituted off) 118'
CB	3	Kalidou Koulibaly (c)
CB	19	Moussa Niakhaté
RM	15	Krépin Diatta
CM	25	Lamine Camara	(yellow card) 72'	(substituted off) 87'
CM	17	Pape Matar Sarr
LM	14	Ismail Jakobs
RF	18	Ismaïla Sarr		(substituted off) 96'
CF	20	Habib Diallo	(yellow card) 59'	(substituted off) 67'
LF	10	Sadio Mané	(yellow card) 9'
Substitutions:
FW	7	Nicolas Jackson		(substituted on) 67'
MF	5	Idrissa Gueye		(substituted on) 87'
FW	13	Iliman Ndiaye		(substituted on) 96'
FW	9	Bamba Dieng		(substituted on) 118'
Manager:
Aliou Cissé			(yellow card) 84'

GK	1	Yahia Fofana
RB	17	Serge Aurier (c)	(yellow card) 95'
CB	7	Odilon Kossounou		(substituted off) 116'
CB	21	Evan Ndicka
LB	3	Ghislain Konan
DM	18	Ibrahim Sangaré		(substituted off) 73'
CM	4	Jean Michaël Seri	(yellow card) 90'
CM	6	Seko Fofana		(substituted off) 79'
RW	14	Oumar Diakité		(substituted off) 65'
LW	15	Max Gradel		(substituted off) 64'
CF	11	Jean-Philippe Krasso		(substituted off) 72'
Substitutions:
FW	24	Simon Adingra		(substituted on) 64'
FW	19	Nicolas Pépé		(substituted on) 65'
FW	22	Sébastien Haller		(substituted on) 72'
MF	8	Franck Kessié		(substituted on) 73'
FW	20	Christian Kouamé	(yellow card) 82'	(substituted on) 79'
DF	5	Wilfried Singo		(substituted on) 116'
Manager:
Emerse Faé

Man of the Match:
Jean Michaël Seri (Ivory Coast)

Assistant referees:
Boris Ditsoga (Gabon)
Carine Atezambong (Cameroon)
Fourth official:
Bouchra Karboubi (Morocco)
Video assistant referee:
Mahmoud El-Banna (Egypt)
Assistant video assistant referees:
Samir Guezzaz (Morocco)
Zakaria Brinsi (Morocco)

=== Mali vs Burkina Faso ===
The two teams met for the first time in an AFCON since 2004, which ended with Mali winning 3–1 over their neighbour.

Mali got off to a dream start at the third minute when Amadou Haidara had his shot hit the woodwork with a thumping head from Hamari Traoré’s cross, only for Edmond Tapsoba to inadvertently clip the rebound into his own net to score a hilarious own goal and give Mali the lead. The match became increasingly more intense as both sides exchanged fires on each other, but it was the Malians who once again struck a goal when, at the second minute of the restart, it was Hamari who once again produced a brilliant cross allowing Lassine Sinayoko to beat the offside trap and race through on goal before slotting through Hervé Koffi. Ten minutes later, Burkina Faso got a lifeline when from a ball fight, Boubakar Kouyaté let the ball touch his hand, before Bertrand Traoré converted neatly on the spot. However, Mali's valiant effort ultimately resulted in the win as Burkina Faso failed to repeat their heroic 2021 Africa Cup of Nations feat.

With this win, it marked for the first time since 2013 that Mali won a knockout stage match.

30 January 2024
17:00

Mali	2–1	Burkina Faso
E. Tapsoba 3' (o.g.); Sinayoko 47'	Report	Traoré 57' (pen.)

Amadou Gon Coulibaly Stadium, Korhogo
Attendance: 19,184
Referee: Mutaz Ibrahim (Libya)

Mali	Burkina Faso

GK	16	Djigui Diarra
RB	2	Hamari Traoré (c)
CB	5	Boubakar Kouyaté
CB	6	Sikou Niakaté
LB	17	Falaye Sacko
RM	12	Mohamed Camara		(substituted off) 90+3'
CM	11	Lassana Coulibaly		(substituted off) 74'
CM	4	Amadou Haidara		(substituted off) 74'
LM	21	Adama Traoré		(substituted off) 74'
CF	25	Lassine Sinayoko	(yellow card) 81'	(substituted off) 90+3'
CF	26	Kamory Doumbia
Substitutions:
MF	8	Diadie Samassékou		(substituted on) 74'
FW	20	Sékou Koïta		(substituted on) 74'
FW	19	Fousseni Diabaté		(substituted on) 74'
DF	15	Mamadou Fofana		(substituted on) 90+3'
MF	24	Boubacar Traoré		(substituted on) 90+3'
Manager:
Éric Chelle

GK	16	Hervé Koffi
RB	9	Issa Kaboré
CB	14	Issoufou Dayo (c)
CB	12	Edmond Tapsoba	(yellow card) 81'
LB	25	Steeve Yago		(substituted off) 46'
CM	20	Gustavo Sangaré		(substituted off) 87'
CM	18	Ismahila Ouédraogo		(substituted off) 68'
CM	22	Blati Touré
RW	10	Bertrand Traoré		(substituted off) 77'
CF	13	Mohamed Konaté
LW	15	Abdoul Tapsoba	(yellow card) 27'	(substituted off) 46'
Substitutions:
DF	4	Adamo Nagalo		(substituted on) 46'
FW	8	Cedric Badolo	(yellow card) 72'	(substituted on) 46'
MF	6	Sacha Banse		(substituted on) 68'
FW	7	Dango Ouattara		(substituted on) 77'
MF	17	Stephane Aziz Ki		(substituted on) 87'
Manager:
(France) Hubert Velud

Man of the Match:
Lassine Sinayoko (Mali)

Assistant referees:
Khalil Hassani (Tunisia)
Diana Chikotesha (Zambia)
Fourth official:
Youcef Gamouh (Algeria)
Video assistant referee:
Lahlou Benbraham (Algeria)
Assistant video assistant referees:
Akhona Makalima (South Africa)
Djibril Camara (Senegal)

=== Morocco vs South Africa ===
This was their first AFCON meeting since 2019, where Morocco won their first ever AFCON encounter against South Africa 1–0. Their most recent encounters, interestingly, occurred during the 2023 Africa Cup of Nations qualification, which both teams sharing a win with coincidental results (2–1).

Being the superior team on paper, Morocco quickly applied pressure on South Africa and even got a goal by Abde Ezzalzouli at the 33rd minute, before it was ruled out for offside. However, the South Africans proved their resilience by withstanding waves of Moroccan attacks while successfully neutralising energetic Moroccan midfielders. Unable to find the back of the net, Morocco were forced to pay a heavy price at the 57th minute when Evidence Makgopa sprung the offside trap, finishing well to the bottom left corner to spark shock celebration for the South Africans. Morocco got a chance to equalise after Ayoub El Kaabi forced Mothobi Mvala to use hand on ball at the 83rd minute, giving a golden opportunity on the spot. However, Achraf Hakimi missed the penalty, shooting against the crossbar. The situation turned worse for Morocco at the added time when Sofyan Amrabat made a bad challenge on Teboho Mokoena, resulting in a straight red card; Mokoena capitalised it with a thunderous free kick to make it two, ultimately burying any hope of Morocco winning the second AFCON title whilst South Africa continued its quest to win its own second.

30 January 2024
20:00

Morocco	0–2	South Africa
	Report	Makgopa 57'; Mokoena 90+5'

Laurent Pokou Stadium, San Pédro
Attendance: 19,078
Referee: Mahmood Ismail (Sudan)

Morocco	South Africa

GK	1	Yassine Bounou
RB	2	Achraf Hakimi
CB	5	Nayef Aguerd
CB	6	Romain Saïss (c)
LB	3	Noussair Mazraoui		(substituted off) 76'
CM	4	Sofyan Amrabat	(yellow card) 64' (red card) 90+4'
CM	8	Azzedine Ounahi
RW	21	Amine Adli		(substituted off) 60'
AM	15	Selim Amallah		(substituted off) 60'
LW	16	Abde Ezzalzouli		(substituted off) 69'
CF	19	Youssef En-Nesyri
Substitutions:
MF	10	Amine Harit		(substituted on) 60'
MF	11	Ismael Saibari		(substituted on) 60'
FW	20	Ayoub El Kaabi		(substituted on) 69'
DF	25	Yahia Attiyat Allah		(substituted on) 76'
Manager:
Walid Regragui

GK	1	Ronwen Williams (c)
RB	20	Khuliso Mudau
CB	18	Grant Kekana	(yellow card) 36'
CB	14	Mothobi Mvala	(yellow card) 83'
LB	23	Thapelo Morena
CM	4	Teboho Mokoena
CM	13	Sphephelo Sithole		(substituted off) 87'
RW	10	Percy Tau
AM	11	Themba Zwane		(substituted off) 70'
LW	6	Aubrey Modiba	(yellow card) 29'
CF	9	Evidence Makgopa		(substituted off) 72'
Substitutions:
MF	12	Thapelo Maseko		(substituted on) 70'
FW	17	Zakhele Lepasa		(substituted on) 72'
MF	15	Thabang Monare		(substituted on) 87'
Manager:
(Belgium) Hugo Broos

Man of the Match:
Teboho Mokoena (South Africa)

Assistant referees:
Elvis Noupué (Cameroon)
Ibrahim Mohamed (Sudan)
Fourth official:
Samuel Uwikunda (Rwanda)
Video assistant referee:
Daniel Nii Laryea (Ghana)
Assistant video assistant referees:
Issa Sy (Senegal)
Mahmoud El-Regal (Egypt)

== Quarter-finals ==
=== Nigeria vs Angola ===
It was the first time the two met in an AFCON match, with their most recent competitive fixture happened during the 2006 FIFA World Cup qualification, where Angola overcame Nigeria en route to their historic debut at the 2006 FIFA World Cup.

Nigeria were the better team on paper, but Angola forced them to work hard with a dangerous shot by Gilberto from a corner kick before denied by Stanley Nwabili. Nigeria grew into the match, though, but not until the 41st minute that, when Moses Simon effortlessly skipped over Kialonda Gaspar’s challenge and teed up to Ademola Lookman smashed the ball home with a clinical first-time finish. Lookman's goal turned out to be the only goal of the match as Nigeria secured their passage to the semi-finals for the first time since 2019.

2 February 2024
17:00

Nigeria	1–0	Angola
Lookman 41'	Report

Felix Houphouet Boigny Stadium, Abidjan
Attendance: 18,757
Referee: Issa Sy (Senegal)

Nigeria	Angola

GK	23	Stanley Nwabili
RB	6	Semi Ajayi
CB	5	William Troost-Ekong (c)
LB	21	Calvin Bassey	(yellow card) 55'
RM	2	Ola Aina
CM	8	Frank Onyeka		(substituted off) 87'
CM	17	Alex Iwobi		(substituted off) 80'
LM	3	Zaidu Sanusi
RW	15	Moses Simon
CF	18	Ademola Lookman		(substituted off) 90+5'
LW	9	Victor Osimhen		(substituted off) 90+5'
Substitutions:
MF	4	Alhassan Yusuf		(substituted on) 80'
MF	10	Joe Aribo		(substituted on) 87'
FW	19	Paul Onuachu		(substituted on) 90+5'
DF	22	Kenneth Omeruo		(substituted on) 90+5'
Manager:
(Portugal) José Peseiro

GK	1	Antonio Dominique
RB	21	Eddie Afonso		(substituted off) 76'
CB	6	Gaspar	(yellow card) 71'
CB	3	Jonathan Buatu
LB	13	Augusto Carneiro
CM	16	Fredy (c)		(substituted off) 66'
CM	23	Show
CM	20	Estrela		(substituted off) 46'
RW	7	Gilberto		(substituted off) 66'
CF	19	Mabululu	(yellow card) 72'
LW	10	Gelson Dala	(yellow card) 74'	(substituted off) 86'
Substitutions:
FW	9	Zini		(substituted on) 46'
MF	17	Bruno Paz		(substituted on) 66'
FW	15	Zito Luvumbo		(substituted on) 66'
FW	18	Jérémie Bela		(substituted on) 86'
FW	11	Felício Milson		(substituted on) 78'
Manager:
(Portugal) Pedro Gonçalves

Man of the Match:
Moses Simon (Nigeria)

Assistant referees:
Djibril Camara (Senegal)
Nouha Bangoura (Senegal)
Fourth official:
Abdel Aziz Bouh (Mauritania)
Video assistant referee:
Dahane Beida (Mauritania)
Assistant video assistant referees:
Haythem Guirat (Tunisia)
Mahmoud El-Regal (Egypt)

=== DR Congo vs Guinea ===
It was the first AFCON meeting between two since 2004, where Guinea won 2–1. However, their most recent competitive fixture happened at the 2018 FIFA World Cup qualification, where DR Congo triumphed 3–1 though DR Congo ended up failing to qualify for the 2018 FIFA World Cup.

The match started in favour for the Guineans when Chancel Mbemba committed a push on Mohamed Bayo on the box before Bayo himself converted it at the 21st minute on the spot. However, Mbemba redeemed six minutes later when from a corner by Arthur Masuaku, a misjudging header allowed Mbemba to fire a clinical strike into the roof of the net. Empowered by the equaliser, DR Congo poured further efforts to find goal, but not until the 65th minute that Julian Jeanvier's poor foul against Silas on the box was capitalised by Yoane Wissa with a clinical penalty. Masuaku then buried any hope for a Guinean comeback at the 82nd minute with a thunderous free kick too hard to deny.

With this win, DR Congo marched to the semi-finals of the AFCON for the first time since 2015.

2 February 2024
20:00

DR Congo	3–1	Guinea
Mbemba 27'; Wissa 65' (pen.); Masuaku 82'	Report	Bayo 21' (pen.)

Alassane Ouattara Stadium, Abidjan
Attendance: 33,278
Referee: Mustapha Ghorbal (Algeria)

DR Congo	Guinea

GK	1	Lionel Mpasi
RB	24	Gédéon Kalulu
CB	22	Chancel Mbemba (c)
CB	2	Henoc Inonga Baka
LB	26	Arthur Masuaku	(yellow card) 37'
CM	18	Charles Pickel
CM	8	Samuel Moutoussamy
RW	13	Meschak Elia		(substituted off) 59'
AM	10	Théo Bongonda		(substituted off) 84'
LW	20	Yoane Wissa		(substituted off) 84'
CF	17	Cédric Bakambu		(substituted off) 72'
Substitutions:
FW	11	Silas		(substituted on) 59'
FW	23	Simon Banza		(substituted on) 72'
DF	12	Joris Kayembe		(substituted on) 84'
MF	6	Aaron Tshibola		(substituted on) 84'
Manager:
(France) Sébastien Desabre

GK	22	Ibrahim Koné
RB	12	Ibrahim Diakité		(substituted off) 90+1'
CB	5	Mouctar Diakhaby
CB	17	Julian Jeanvier
LB	3	Issiaga Sylla
CM	6	Amadou Diawara	(yellow card) 64'	(substituted off) 69'
CM	8	Naby Keïta (c)
RW	7	Morgan Guilavogui		(substituted off) 59'
AM	18	Aguibou Camara
LW	21	Sekou Sylla		(substituted off) 59'
CF	11	Mohamed Bayo		(substituted off) 90+2'
Substitutions:
MF	23	Abdoulaye Touré		(substituted on) 59'
FW	25	Facinet Conte	(yellow card) 79'	(substituted on) 59'
FW	9	Serhou Guirassy		(substituted on) 69'
DF	2	Antoine Conte		(substituted on) 90+1'
FW	19	François Kamano		(substituted on) 90+2'
Manager:
Kaba Diawara

Man of the Match:
Yoane Wissa (DR Congo)

Assistant referees:
Mokrane Gourari (Algeria)
Abbès Zerhouni (Algeria)
Fourth official:
Omar Artan (Somalia)
Video assistant referee:
Daniel Nii Laryea (Ghana)
Assistant video assistant referees:
Abongile Tom (South Africa)
Diana Chikotesha (Zambia)

=== Mali vs Ivory Coast ===
This was their first AFCON encounter since 2019, where Ivory Coast won 1–0.

Mali were the better team at the first half and could have gotten the lead early when Odilon Kossounou bundled into Lassine Sinayoko in the box to give the Malians a penalty at the 16th minute, but Adama Traoré threw away that golden chance with his shot denied by Yahia Fofana. However, Mali got a huge boost when from Jean Michaël Seri's misjudgement led to Kossounou to again foul Sinayoko, resulted in Ivory Coast reduced to ten. However, not until the 71st minute that Dorgeles Nene, who is of Ivorian ancestry, produced a glorious curling finish from outside of the area into the top-right corner to give Mali the lead. But as Mali were thought to advance given the sheer advantage, Ivory Coast got a shocking equaliser at the last minute of regulation time, Seko Fofana’s first attempt from 18 yards pinballed off two defenders before falling to Simon Adingra, who clinically dispatched into the top left corner from close range to put the match through to another 30 minutes. However, madness arrived at the second minute of added time in the second half of extra time when, Seko Fofana crepted through a crowded penalty area and was flicked in by Oumar Diakité to send ten-men Ivory Coast to the semi-finals in an emotional and insane encounter.

3 February 2024
17:00

Mali	1–2 (a.e.t.)	Ivory Coast
Nene 71'	Report	Adingra 90'; Diakité 120+2'

Stade de la Paix, Bouaké
Attendance: 39,836
Referee: Mohamed Adel (Egypt)

Mali	Ivory Coast

GK	16	Djigui Diarra
RB	2	Hamari Traoré (c)	(red card) 120+5'
CB	5	Boubakar Kouyaté
CB	6	Sikou Niakaté
LB	17	Falaye Sacko
CM	11	Lassana Coulibaly	(yellow card) 80'	(substituted off) 89'
CM	8	Diadie Samassékou		(substituted off) 102'
CM	4	Amadou Haidara	(yellow card) 45+3'	(substituted off) 62'
AM	26	Kamory Doumbia		(substituted off) 90+7'
CF	25	Lassine Sinayoko		(substituted off) 89'
CF	21	Adama Traoré	(yellow card) 39'	(substituted off) 63'
Substitutions:
FW	19	Fousseni Diabaté		(substituted on) 62'
FW	27	Dorgeles Nene		(substituted on) 63'
DF	15	Mamadou Fofana		(substituted on) 89'
MF	24	Boubacar Traoré		(substituted on) 89'
MF	10	Yves Bissouma		(substituted on) 90+7'
FW	9	Ibrahim Sissoko		(substituted on) 102'
Manager:
Éric Chelle

GK	1	Yahia Fofana	(yellow card) 90+2'
RB	17	Serge Aurier (c)	(yellow card) 37'	(substituted off) 46'
CB	7	Odilon Kossounou	(yellow card) 16' (yellow-red card) 43'
CB	21	Evan Ndicka
LB	3	Ghislain Konan
CM	4	Jean Michaël Seri		(substituted off) 86'
CM	8	Franck Kessié
CM	6	Seko Fofana
RW	19	Nicolas Pépé		(substituted off) 45+3'
CF	20	Christian Kouamé	(yellow card) 33'	(substituted off) 46'
LW	15	Max Gradel		(substituted off) 73'
Substitutions:
DF	5	Wilfried Singo		(substituted on) 45+3'
DF	12	Willy Boly		(substituted on) 46'
FW	22	Sébastien Haller		(substituted on) 46'
MF	14	Oumar Diakité	(yellow card) 111' (yellow-red card) 120+3'	(substituted on) 73'
MF	24	Simon Adingra		(substituted on) 86'
Manager:
Emerse Faé

Man of the Match:
Oumar Diakité (Ivory Coast)

Assistant referees:
Jerson dos Santos (Angola)
Attia Amsaeed (Libya)
Fourth official:
Mahamat Alhadji (Chad)
Video assistant referee:
Akhona Makalima (South Africa)
Assistant video assistant referees:
Lahlou Benbraham (Algeria)
Steven Moutsassi (Congo)

=== Cape Verde vs South Africa ===
It was the two's first AFCON meeting since 2013, where Cape Verde shocked South Africa with a goalless draw. Their most recent competitive meetings happened at the 2018 FIFA World Cup qualification, which Cape Verde produced two shocking wins with coincidental results (2–1).

Cape Verde proved to be more dominant in the match, but they failed to capitalise from every opportunity they got, whereas South Africa also put some pressure to force Cape Verde's Vozinha to save. However, the match was rather dull with very little actions and, after the match ended goalless in 120 minutes, they were forced to go to penalties. South Africa goalkeeper Ronwen Williams became the first goalkeeper in AFCON history to save four penalty kicks in a shoot-out, while his teammates scored twice from four attempts, which was enough to secure South Africa's progression to the semi-finals for the first time since 2000.

3 February 2024
20:00

Cape Verde	0–0 (a.e.t.)	South Africa
	Report
Penalties
Bebé (penalty missed); Semedo (penalty missed); L. Duarte (penalty missed); Teixeira (penalty scored); Andrade (penalty missed)	1–2	(penalty scored) Mokoena; (penalty missed) Lepasa; (penalty missed) Modiba; (penalty scored) Mvala

Charles Konan Banny Stadium, Yamoussoukro
Attendance: 12,162
Referee: Jean-Jacques Ndala (DR Congo)

Cape Verde	South Africa

GK	1	Vozinha
RB	23	Steven Moreira
CB	5	Logan Costa
CB	4	Pico
LB	26	Kevin Pina		(substituted off) 65'
CM	10	Jamiro Monteiro		(substituted off) 86'
CM	18	Kenny Rocha		(substituted off) 119'
AM	8	João Paulo
RF	20	Ryan Mendes (c)	(yellow card) 27'	(substituted off) 65'
CF	7	Jovane Cabral		(substituted off) 87'
LF	11	Garry Rodrigues		(substituted off) 72'
Substitutions:
FW	17	Willy Semedo		(substituted on) 65'
MF	6	Patrick Andrade		(substituted on) 65'
FW	21	Bebé		(substituted on) 72'
MF	15	Laros Duarte		(substituted on) 86'
FW	9	Gilson Tavares		(substituted on) 87'
FW	19	Bryan Teixeira		(substituted on) 119'
Manager:
Bubista

GK	1	Ronwen Williams (c)
RB	20	Khuliso Mudau	(substituted off) 103'
CB	18	Grant Kekana
CB	14	Mothobi Mvala
LB	23	Thapelo Morena	(substituted off) 63'
CM	4	Teboho Mokoena
CM	13	Sphephelo Sithole
RW	10	Percy Tau	(substituted off) 85'
AM	11	Themba Zwane	(substituted off) 90'
LW	6	Aubrey Modiba
CF	9	Evidence Makgopa	(substituted off) 103'
Substitutions:
MF	12	Thapelo Maseko	(substituted on) 63'	(substituted off) 114'
FW	21	Mihlali Mayambela	(substituted on) 85'
MF	8	Jayden Adams	(substituted on) 90'
DF	2	Nyiko Mobbie	(substituted on) 103'
FW	17	Zakhele Lepasa	(substituted on) 103'
DF	3	Terrence Mashego	(substituted on) 114'
Manager:
(Belgium) Hugo Broos

Man of the Match:
Ronwen Williams (South Africa)

Assistant referees:
Gilbert Cheruiyot (Kenya)
Liban Abdoulrazack (Djibouti)
Fourth official:
Ibrahim Traoré (Ivory Coast)
Video assistant referee:
Mahmoud Ashour (Egypt)
Assistant video assistant referees:
Peter Waweru (Kenya)
Khalil Hassani (Tunisia)

== Semi-finals ==
=== Nigeria vs South Africa ===
7 February 2024
17:00

Nigeria	1–1 (a.e.t.)	South Africa
Troost-Ekong 67' (pen.)	Report	Mokoena 90' (pen.)
Penalties
Moffi (penalty scored); Omeruo (penalty scored); Aina (penalty missed); Troost-Ekong (penalty scored); Iheanacho (penalty scored)	4–2	(penalty missed) Mokoena; (penalty scored) Mayambela; (penalty missed) Makgopa; (penalty scored) Mvala

Stade de la Paix, Bouaké
Attendance: 31,227
Referee: Amin Omar (Egypt)

Nigeria	South Africa

GK	23	Stanley Nwabili
RB	2	Ola Aina
CB	5	William Troost-Ekong (c)	(yellow card) 120'
CB	6	Semi Ajayi
LB	21	Calvin Bassey
CM	12	Bright Osayi-Samuel		(substituted off) 120+2'
CM	8	Frank Onyeka	(yellow card) 101'	(substituted off) 102'
CM	17	Alex Iwobi		(substituted off) 63'
RW	15	Moses Simon		(substituted off) 63'
CF	9	Victor Osimhen		(substituted off) 110'
LW	18	Ademola Lookman		(substituted off) 102'
Substitutions:
FW	11	Samuel Chukwueze		(substituted on) 63'
MF	4	Alhassan Yusuf		(substituted on) 63'
MF	10	Joe Aribo		(substituted on) 102'
FW	14	Kelechi Iheanacho		(substituted on) 102'
FW	24	Terem Moffi		(substituted on) 110'
DF	22	Kenneth Omeruo		(substituted on) 120+2'
Manager:
(Portugal) José Peseiro

GK	1	Ronwen Williams (c)
CB	18	Grant Kekana	(red card) 115'
CB	5	Siyanda Xulu		(substituted off) 75'
CB	14	Mothobi Mvala
RM	20	Khuliso Mudau
CM	4	Teboho Mokoena
CM	13	Sphephelo Sithole
LM	6	Aubrey Modiba
RF	10	Percy Tau
CF	9	Evidence Makgopa
LF	11	Themba Zwane		(substituted off) 75'
Substitutions:
FW	21	Mihlali Mayambela		(substituted on) 75'
FW	17	Zakhele Lepasa		(substituted on) 75'	(substituted off) 117'
DF	19	Nkosinathi Sibisi		(substituted on) 117'
Manager:
(Belgium) Hugo Broos

Man of the Match:
Stanley Nwabili (Nigeria)

Assistant referees:
Mahmoud El-Regal (Egypt)
Ahmed Hossam (Egypt)
Fourth official:
Mahmood Ismail (Sudan)
Video assistant referee:
Lahlou Benbraham (Algeria)
Assistant video assistant referees:
Omar Artan (Somalia)
Diana Chikotesha (Zambia)

=== Ivory Coast vs DR Congo ===
7 February 2024
20:00

Ivory Coast	1–0	DR Congo
Haller 65'	Report

Alassane Ouattara Stadium, Abidjan
Attendance: 51,020
Referee: Mutaz Ibrahim (Libya)

Ivory Coast	DR Congo

GK	1	Yahia Fofana
RB	5	Wilfried Singo
CB	12	Willy Boly
CB	21	Evan Ndicka
LB	3	Ghislain Konan
CM	8	Franck Kessié (c)
CM	4	Jean Michaël Seri	(substituted off) 61'
CM	6	Seko Fofana	(substituted off) 61'
RW	15	Max Gradel	(substituted off) 90'
CF	22	Sébastien Haller	(substituted off) 90'
LW	24	Simon Adingra	(substituted off) 80'
Substitutions:
MF	27	Jean Thierry Lazare	(substituted on) 61'
MF	18	Ibrahim Sangaré	(substituted on) 61'
MF	9	Jonathan Bamba	(substituted on) 80'
FW	11	Jean-Philippe Krasso	(substituted on) 90'
MF	13	Jérémie Boga	(substituted on) 90'
Manager:
Emerse Faé

GK	1	Lionel Mpasi
RB	24	Gédéon Kalulu
CB	22	Chancel Mbemba (c)
CB	2	Henock Inonga Baka
LB	26	Arthur Masuaku
CM	18	Charles Pickel	(substituted off) 70'
CM	8	Samuel Moutoussamy
RW	13	Meschak Elia	(substituted off) 70'
AM	14	Gaël Kakuta	(substituted off) 46'
LW	20	Yoane Wissa	(substituted off) 70'
CF	17	Cédric Bakambu	(substituted off) 69'
Substitutions:
MF	10	Théo Bongonda	(substituted on) 46'
FW	23	Simon Banza	(substituted on) 69'
FW	19	Fiston Mayele	(substituted on) 70'
MF	6	Aaron Tshibola	(substituted on) 70'
FW	11	Silas	(substituted on) 70'
Manager:
(France) Sébastien Desabre

Man of the Match:
Franck Kessié (Ivory Coast)

Assistant referees:
Khalil Hassani (Tunisia)
Liban Abdoulrazack (Djibouti)
Fourth official:
Abdel Aziz Bouh (Mauritania)
Video assistant referee:
Maria Rivet (Mauritius)
Assistant video assistant referees:
Mahmoud Ashour (Egypt)
Ibrahim Mohamed (Sudan)

== Third place play-off ==
10 February 2024
20:00

South Africa	0–0	DR Congo
	Report
Penalties
Mokoena (penalty missed); Sibisi (penalty scored); Monare (penalty scored); Modiba (penalty scored); Lepasa (penalty scored); Appollis (penalty scored); Xulu (penalty scored)	6–5	(penalty scored) Moutoussamy; (penalty scored) Mfulu; (penalty scored) Bakambu; (penalty scored) Kayembe; (penalty missed) Mbemba; (penalty scored) Wissa; (penalty missed) Elia

Felix Houphouet Boigny Stadium, Abidjan
Attendance: 21,975
Referee: Bamlak Tessema Weyesa (Ethiopia)

South Africa	DR Congo

GK	1	Ronwen Williams (c)
RB	20	Khuliso Mudau
CB	5	Siyanda Xulu
CB	19	Nkosinathi Sibisi
LB	23	Thapelo Morena	(substituted off) 72'
CM	4	Teboho Mokoena
CM	13	Sphephelo Sithole
RW	21	Mihlali Mayambela	(substituted off) 89'
AM	11	Themba Zwane	(substituted off) 58'
LW	6	Aubrey Modiba
CF	9	Evidence Makgopa	(substituted off) 58'
Substitutions:
FW	7	Oswin Appollis	(substituted on) 58'
MF	15	Thabang Monare	(substituted on) 58'
DF	3	Terrence Mashego	(substituted on) 72'
FW	17	Zakhele Lepasa	(substituted on) 89'
Manager:
(Belgium) Hugo Broos

GK	16	Dimitry Bertaud
RB	4	Brian Bayeye
CB	22	Chancel Mbemba (c)
CB	5	Dylan Batubinsika
LB	12	Joris Kayembe
CM	6	Aaron Tshibola	(yellow card) 28'	(substituted off) 45'
CM	8	Samuel Moutoussamy
RW	10	Théo Bongonda		(substituted off) 33'
AM	7	Grady Diangana		(substituted off) 68'
LW	11	Silas		(substituted off) 79'
CF	23	Simon Banza		(substituted off) 79'
Substitutions:
FW	13	Meschak Elia		(substituted on) 33'
MF	25	Omenuke Mfulu		(substituted on) 45'
FW	20	Yoane Wissa		(substituted on) 68'
FW	17	Cédric Bakambu		(substituted on) 79'
FW	19	Fiston Mayele		(substituted on) 79'
Manager:
(France) Sébastien Desabre

Man of the Match:
Dylan Batubinsika (DR Congo)

Assistant referees:
Lahsen Azgaou (Morocco)
Mostafa Akarkad (Morocco)
Fourth official:
Omar Artan (Somalia)
Video assistant referee:
Lahlou Benbraham (Algeria)
Assistant video assistant referees:
Issa Sy (Senegal)
Stephen Yiembe (Kenya)

== Final ==
11 February 2024
20:00

Nigeria	1–2	Ivory Coast
Troost-Ekong 38'	Report	Kessié 62'; Haller 81'

Alassane Ouattara Stadium, Abidjan
Attendance: 57,094
Referee: Dahane Beida (Mauritania)

Nigeria	Ivory Coast

GK	23	Stanley Nwabili	(yellow card) 53'
CB	6	Semi Ajayi
CB	5	William Troost-Ekong (c)
CB	21	Calvin Bassey
RM	2	Ola Aina	(yellow card) 90'
CM	8	Frank Onyeka		(substituted off) 86'
CM	17	Alex Iwobi		(substituted off) 79'
LM	3	Zaidu Sanusi		(substituted off) 86'
RW	11	Samuel Chukwueze		(substituted off) 56'
CF	9	Victor Osimhen
LW	18	Ademola Lookman		(substituted off) 79'
Substitutions:
FW	15	Moses Simon		(substituted on) 56'
MF	4	Alhassan Yusuf		(substituted on) 79'
FW	14	Kelechi Iheanacho		(substituted on) 79'
MF	10	Joe Aribo		(substituted on) 86'
FW	24	Terem Moffi		(substituted on) 86'
Manager:
(Portugal) José Peseiro			(yellow card) 28'

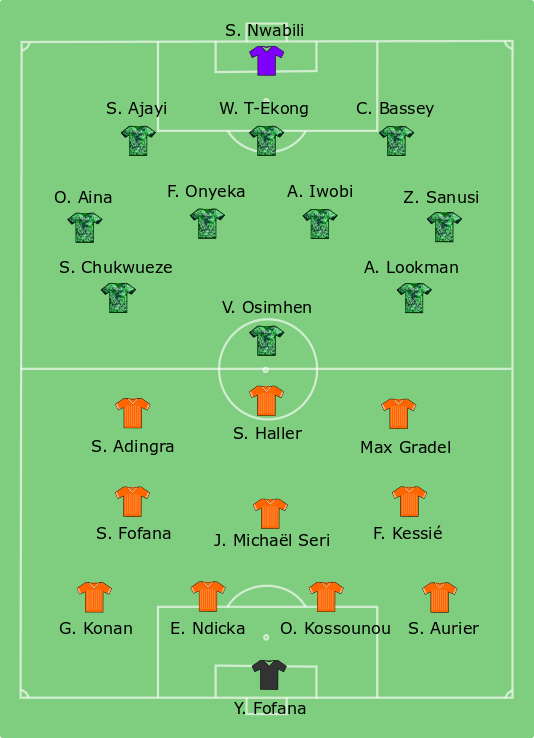

GK	1	Yahia Fofana
RB	17	Serge Aurier (c)	(yellow card) 54'	(substituted off) 70'
CB	7	Odilon Kossounou
CB	21	Evan Ndicka	(yellow card) 90+7'
LB	3	Ghislain Konan
CM	8	Franck Kessié
CM	4	Jean Michaël Seri		(substituted off) 90+2'
CM	6	Seko Fofana	(yellow card) 87'	(substituted off) 88'
RW	15	Max Gradel		(substituted off) 70'
CF	22	Sébastien Haller		(substituted off) 88'
LW	24	Simon Adingra
Substitutions:
DF	5	Wilfried Singo		(substituted on) 70'
FW	14	Oumar Diakité		(substituted on) 70'
FW	11	Jean-Philippe Krasso		(substituted on) 88'
MF	18	Ibrahim Sangaré		(substituted on) 88'
MF	27	Jean Thierry Lazare		(substituted on) 90+2'
Manager:
Emerse Faé

Man of the Match:
Simon Adingra (Ivory Coast)

Assistant referees:
Emiliano Dos Santos (Angola)
Diana Chikotesha (Zambia)
Fourth official:
Bouchra Karboubi (Morocco)
Reserve assistant referee:
Seydou Tiama (Burkina Faso)
Video assistant referee:
Mohamed Ashour (Egypt)
Assistant video assistant referees:
Maria Rivet (Mauritius)
Mohamed Ibrahim (Sudan)

== See also ==
- List of Africa Cup of Nations finals
