= 2023 Africa Cup of Nations final =

Football match played in February 2024

- The Alassane Ouattara Stadium hosted the match.
- Event: 2023 Africa Cup of Nations
Nigeria	Ivory Coast
1	2
- Date: 11 February 2024
- Venue: Alassane Ouattara Stadium, Abidjan
- Man of the Match: Simon Adingra (Ivory Coast)
- Referee: Dahane Beida (Mauritania)
- Attendance: 57,094
- Weather: Partly cloudy 28 °C (82 °F); 83% humidity

The 2023 Africa Cup of Nations final was a football match played on 11 February 2024 between Ivory Coast and Nigeria. It determined the winner of the 2023 Africa Cup of Nations, the 34th edition of the biennial African tournament organized by the Confederation of African Football (CAF). The match was played at the Alassane Ouattara Stadium in Abidjan, Ivory Coast. Nigeria qualified for the final for the eighth time in their history, while Ivory Coast reached the final for the fifth time.

Ivory Coast won the match in regulation time with a score of 2–1. With this victory, the team won its third Africa Cup of Nations title, while Nigeria took second place. Nigeria took the lead in the 38th minute with a goal from William Troost-Ekong, but Ivory Coast turned things around with goals from Franck Kessié in the 62nd minute and Sébastien Haller in the 81st minute. Simon Adingra was awarded the Man of the Match award for his all round performance, having assisted both goals.

== Venue ==
The final was played at Alassane Ouattara Stadium, also known as Stade Olympique d'Ebimpe, a multi-purpose stadium in northern Abidjan, the largest city in the Ivory Coast. It opened in October 2020 and is named for Ivorian president Alassane Ouattara. The stadium seats 60,000 spectators and serves as the primary home of the Ivory Coast national football team. It also hosts rugby and athletic events and is part of a complex that was jointly funded by the Ivorian and Chinese governments. During the Africa Cup of Nations, Alassane Ouattara Stadium hosted six group stage matches and one match in each of the knockout rounds. The stadium was announced as the host of the final in November 2022 upon the signing of a host agreement between CAF and the Ivorian government; Cameroon was the original host of the 2023 edition of the tournament but was awarded the 2021 edition following delays to their plan to host the 2019 edition.

== Match officials ==
The referee appointed to oversee the final was Dahane Beida of Mauritania. He had overseen a group stage game and another one in the round of 16, being considered an experienced referee by the CAF. Beida's assistant referees were Jerson Emiliano dos Santos of Angola and Diana Chikotesha of Zambia. Egyptian Mahmoud Ashour was designated as the video assistant referee, with Maria Rivet of Mauritius and Mohamed Ibrahim of Sudan as assistant VAR officials. The fourth official was Moroccan Bouchra Karboubi, and the reserve assistant referee was Seydou Tiama of Burkina Faso.

== Route to the final ==
=== Nigeria ===
Nigeria results
Round	Opponent	Result
GS	Equatorial Guinea	1–1
GS	Ivory Coast	1–0
GS	Guinea-Bissau	1–0
R16	Cameroon	2–0
QF	Angola	1–0
SF	South Africa	1–1 (a.e.t.) (4–2 p)

Nigeria, nicknamed the Super Eagles, have won the Africa Cup of Nations three times and finished four times as runners-up. The team entered the 2023 tournament as the winners of Group A during the qualification round. They had five wins and one loss during qualification and amassed a goal differential of 18. Nigeria was drawn into Group A for the tournament proper along with hosts Ivory Coast, Equatorial Guinea, and Guinea-Bissau. They entered as favorites to advance under the leadership of striker Victor Osimhen, who was voted 2023 African Footballer of the Year and scored ten goals during qualification.

In their opening match, Nigeria drew 1–1 with Equatorial Guinea, who were 46 places below them in the world rankings. Equatorial Guinea's sole shot on target was scored by Iban Salvador in the 36th minute and followed by Osimhen's equalizer, but the team was unable to convert several chances to score. Nigeria won 1–0 against Ivory Coast in their next match after earning a penalty kick that was converted by William Troost-Ekong in the second half. The match was described as "a strong defensive performance" for the Super Eagles, who had five defenders in their formation; it was the team's first away win against Ivory Coast. Nigeria finished second in Group A with 7 points behind Equatorial Guinea, the unexpected group leader. The team won 1–0 against Guinea-Bissau in the final match of the group stage, benefitting from an own goal in the first half.

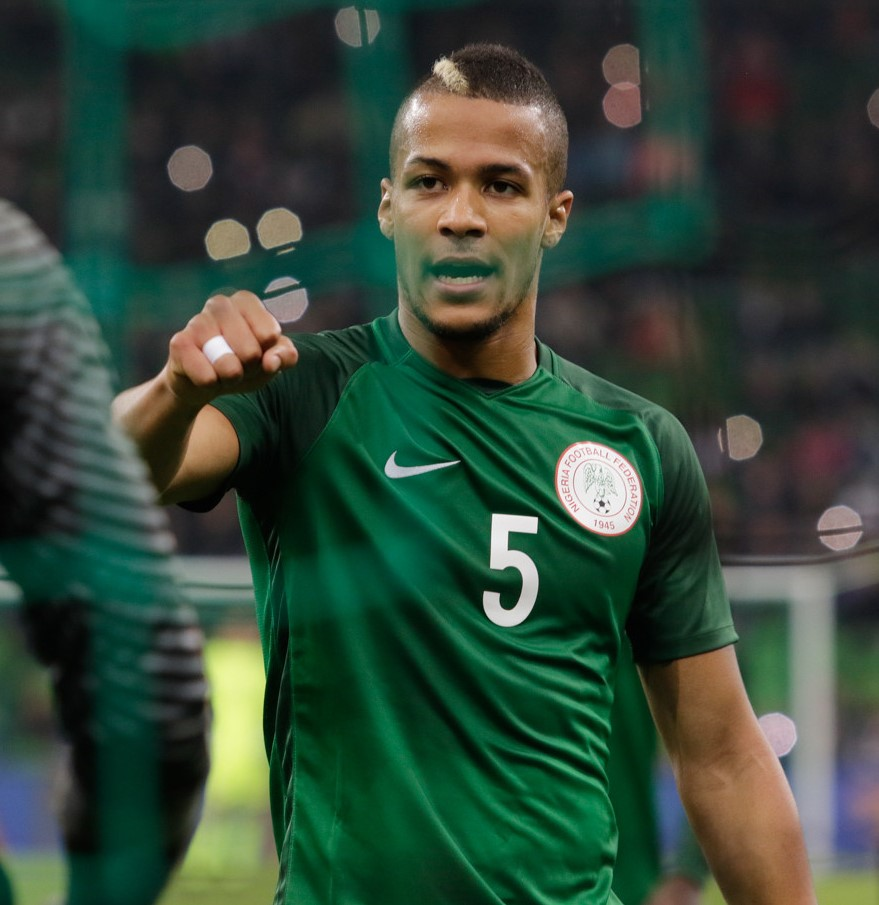
William Troost-Ekong scored three goals and was voted the tournament's best player.

The Super Eagles won 2–0 in their round of 16 match against rivals Cameroon through a dominant midfield performance. Ademola Lookman scored both goals for Nigeria with Osimhen providing an assist on the first in the 36th minute and Calvin Bassey delivering a ball into the box in the 90th minute. The team advanced to the quarterfinals to play Angola in their first meeting since they eliminated Nigeria in qualifiers for the 2006 FIFA World Cup. Lookman scored the lone goal in a 1–0 victory for Nigeria, who maintained their strong defensive posture to earn their 15th semifinal appearance.

Nigeria had few chances to score in their semifinal against South Africa, which was decided entirely from penalty kicks. The Super Eagles fended off several chances for South Africa and opened the scoring in the 67th minute through a foul on Osimhen in penalty area; Troost-Ekong converted the ensuing penalty kick. Osimhen scored an apparent second goal on a counter-attack near the end of the match; it was instead rescinded by video review and a penalty was awarded to South Africa for a foul in the build-up. Teboho Mokoena scored from his penalty to tie the match at 1–1 in the 90th minute; the scoreline was unchanged through extra time, with South Africa playing through a red card for defender Grant Kekana. Nigeria won 4–2 in the penalty shootout with two saves by Stanley Nwabali. Manager José Peseiro utilized a 3–4–3 formation with an emphasis on defense and counter-attacking; during the run to the final, Nigeria only conceded two goals.

=== Ivory Coast ===
Ivory Coast results
Round	Opponent	Result
GS	Guinea-Bissau	2–0
GS	Nigeria	0–1
GS	Equatorial Guinea	0–4
R16	Senegal	1–1 (a.e.t.) (5–4 p)
QF	Mali	2–1 (a.e.t.)
SF	DR Congo	1–0

Hosts Ivory Coast automatically qualified for the 2023 tournament but were entered into the qualification round's group stage to play in competitive matches. They were drawn into Group H and finished level on points with Zambia, who won a head-to-head goal difference tiebreaker to top the group. The team, nicknamed The Elephants (French: Les Éléphant), had previously won the African Cup of Nations in 1992 and 2015. For the tournament, Ivory Coast was placed in Group A as hosts and drawn alongside Nigeria, Equatorial Guinea, and Guinea-Bissau.

The hosts entered the tournament ranked seventh among teams from Africa and with high expectations after losing their "golden generation" that had won in 2015. In the opening match of the tournament, Ivory Coast defeated Guinea-Bissau 2–0 with goals from Seko Fofana in the fourth minute and Jean-Philippe Krasso after half-time. The team lost 1–0 to Nigeria and 4–0 to Equatorial Guinea, the worst home defeat in the country's history, after conceding three goals in a 13-minute stretch. The upset loss to Equatorial Guinea included 22 shots for Ivory Coast, who had two goals voided by the video assistant referee due to offsides. The hosts finished third in Group A with three points but advanced to the knockout stage as the fourth-best team to finish in third place after Morocco defeated Zambia, who finished with two points. Ivory Coast manager Jean-Louis Gasset was fired for the team's "insufficient results" in the group stage and replaced by assistant Emerse Faé in his first stint as a senior manager.

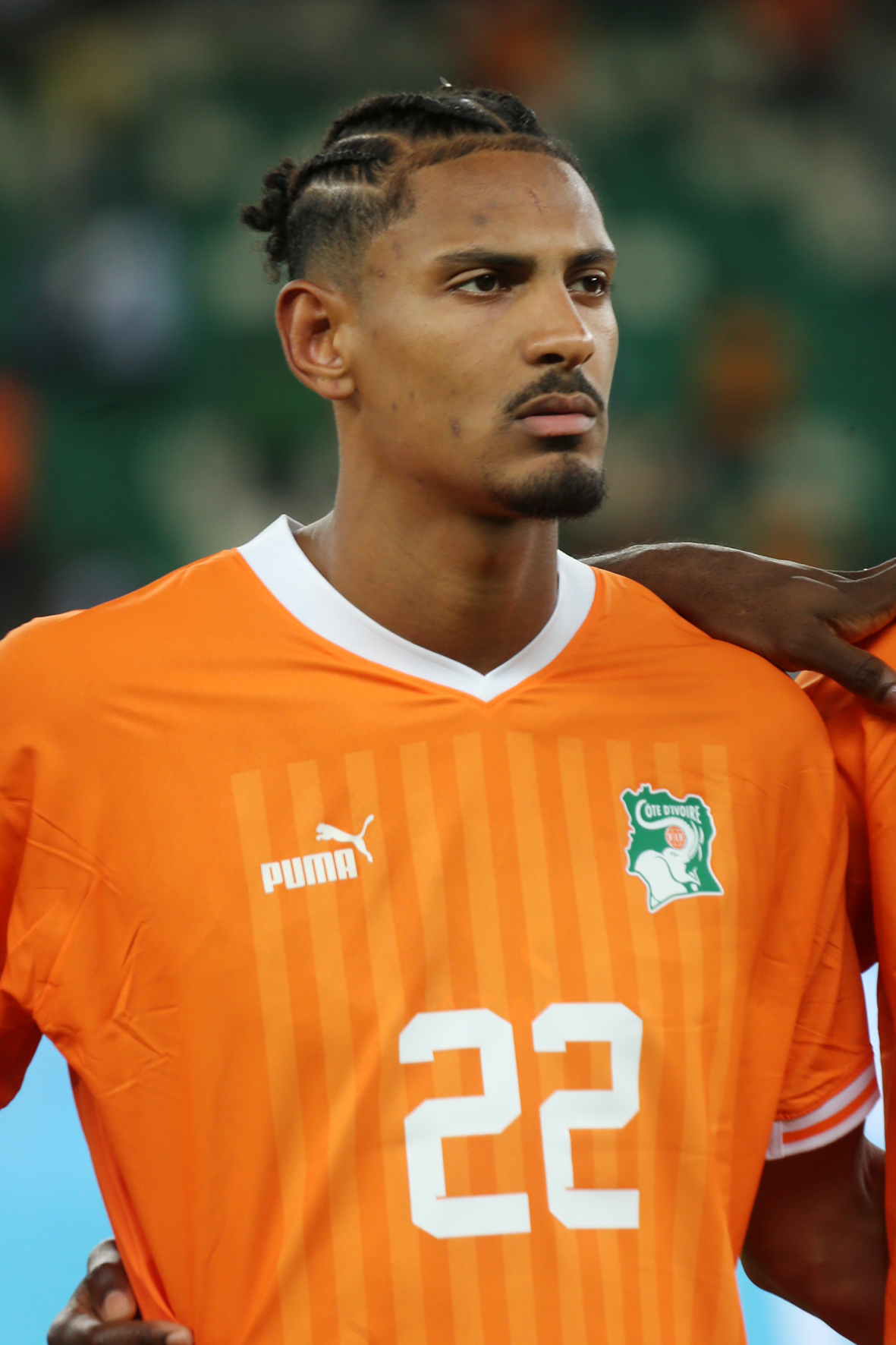
Sébastien Haller scored two goals in the tournament, including the winning goal in the final.

After a failed attempt by the Ivorian federation to temporarily hire former manager Hervé Renard for the remainder of the tournament, Faé had five days to prepare the team for a knockout match against defending champions Senegal. Ivory Coast conceded a goal in the fourth minute to Senegal's Habib Diallo and were unsuccessful in their attempts to score. They were awarded a penalty kick by the video assistant referee that was converted by Franck Kessié in the 86th minute to tie the match at 1–1. After a scoreless extra time, the match was decided in a penalty shootout; Moussa Niakhaté missed his kick for Senegal to give Ivory Coast an advantage, which they rode to a 5–4 victory in the shootout. The hosts advanced to a quarterfinal match against Mali and were held to a scoreless draw in the first half, but avoided conceding after a penalty kick was saved by Yahia Fofana. Ivory Coast then lost defender Odilon Kossounou, whose foul had earned Mali the penalty kick, after he was ejected after being shown a second yellow card in the 43rd minute. They played the remainder of the match with 10 players but equalized in the 90th minute through a rebound converted by Simon Adingra and took the lead in the last minute of extra time with Oumar Diakité, who was sent off with a second yellow card for his celebration.

The team's comeback results in the early knockout stages earned them the nickname "Zombie Elephants". In the semifinal against DR Congo, Ivory Coast controlled the match and earned a 1–0 victory. The winning goal was scored from an acrobatic shot in the 65th minute by Sébastien Haller, who had returned to the team after treating his testicular cancer and saw limited playing time due to ankle injury. Faé became the second manager to reach a continental final after taking over mid-tournament, following Nasser Al-Johar with Saudi Arabia at the 2000 AFC Asian Cup. Ivory Coast became the 15th host nation to play in the AFCON final.

== Match ==
=== Summary ===
Ivory Coast had the better control of the first half, but there were few chances for either side in the opening 30 minutes of the match. Among the early chances were a shot by Adingra that was blocked by Nigeria goalkeeper Nwabali; Nigeria left-back Zaidu Sanusi then had a similar chance but his shot was blocked by Odilon Kossounou, who had returned from his suspension. The latter chance resulted in a corner, from which William Troost-Ekong jumped higher than defender Serge Aurier to head Nigeria into the lead in the 38th minute.

Ivory Coast were the more threatening after half-time; a cross from Adingra was saved by Nwabali, and Calvin Bassey blocked the rebound from Max Gradel. Another corner led to the Ivory Coast's equalizer in the 62nd minute as Franck Kessié was left unmarked at the far post to head into the net. After 74 minutes Haller nearly scored an overhead kick, but his shot went just wide. However, seven minutes later, Haller scored after he flicked Adingra's left-wing cross into the net to put Ivory Coast into the lead, which they maintained for the remainder of the match to win a third AFCON title. Ivory Coast winger Adingra's two assists earned him man of the match honors.

=== Details ===
11 February 2024
20:00

Nigeria	1–2	Ivory Coast
Troost-Ekong 38'	Report	Kessié 62'; Haller 81'

Alassane Ouattara Stadium, Abidjan
Attendance: 57,094
Referee: Dahane Beida (Mauritania)

Nigeria	Ivory Coast

GK	23	Stanley Nwabili	(yellow card) 53'
CB	6	Semi Ajayi
CB	5	William Troost-Ekong (c)
CB	21	Calvin Bassey
RM	2	Ola Aina	(yellow card) 90'
CM	8	Frank Onyeka		(substituted off) 86'
CM	17	Alex Iwobi		(substituted off) 79'
LM	3	Zaidu Sanusi		(substituted off) 86'
RW	11	Samuel Chukwueze		(substituted off) 56'
CF	9	Victor Osimhen
LW	18	Ademola Lookman		(substituted off) 79'
Substitutions:
FW	15	Moses Simon		(substituted on) 56'
MF	4	Alhassan Yusuf		(substituted on) 79'
FW	14	Kelechi Iheanacho		(substituted on) 79'
MF	10	Joe Aribo		(substituted on) 86'
FW	24	Terem Moffi		(substituted on) 86'
Manager:
(Portugal) José Peseiro			(yellow card) 28'

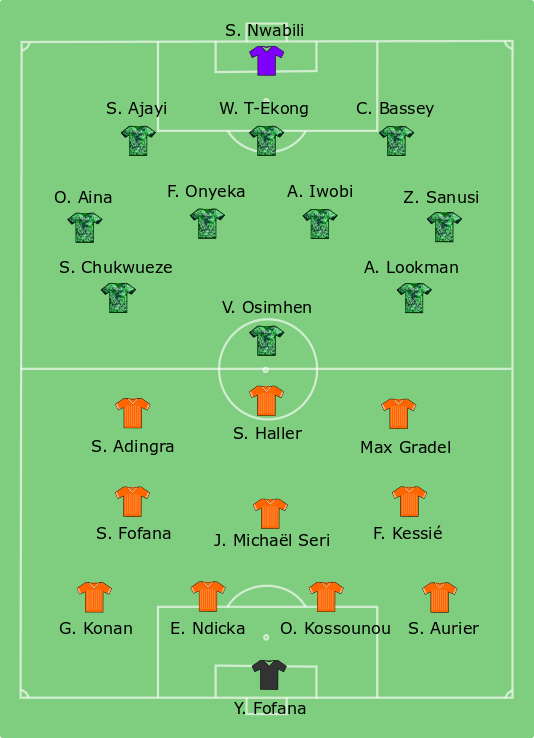

GK	1	Yahia Fofana
RB	17	Serge Aurier (c)	(yellow card) 54'	(substituted off) 70'
CB	7	Odilon Kossounou
CB	21	Evan Ndicka	(yellow card) 90+7'
LB	3	Ghislain Konan
CM	8	Franck Kessié
CM	4	Jean Michaël Seri		(substituted off) 90+2'
CM	6	Seko Fofana	(yellow card) 87'	(substituted off) 88'
RW	15	Max Gradel		(substituted off) 70'
CF	22	Sébastien Haller		(substituted off) 88'
LW	24	Simon Adingra
Substitutions:
DF	5	Wilfried Singo		(substituted on) 70'
FW	14	Oumar Diakité		(substituted on) 70'
FW	11	Jean-Philippe Krasso		(substituted on) 88'
MF	18	Ibrahim Sangaré		(substituted on) 88'
MF	27	Jean Thierry Lazare		(substituted on) 90+2'
Manager:
Emerse Faé

Man of the Match:
Simon Adingra (Ivory Coast)

Assistant referees:
Emiliano Dos Santos (Angola)
Diana Chikotesha (Zambia)
Fourth official:
Bouchra Karboubi (Morocco)
Reserve assistant referee:
Seydou Tiama (Burkina Faso)
Video assistant referee:
Mohamed Ashour (Egypt)
Assistant video assistant referees:
Maria Rivet (Mauritius)
Mohamed Ibrahim (Sudan)

Match rules

- 90 minutes.
- 30 minutes of extra time if necessary.
- Penalty shoot-out if scores still level.
- Maximum of twelve named substitutes.
- Maximum of five substitutions, with a sixth allowed in extra time. (Note: Each team was given only three opportunities to make substitutions, with a fourth opportunity in extra time, excluding substitutions made at half-time, before the start of extra time and at half-time in extra time.)

=== Statistics ===
Statistics	Nigeria	Ivory Coast
Goals scored	1	2
Total shots	5	18
Shots on target	1	8
Ball possession	38%	62%
Pass accuracy	86%	74%
Corner kicks	4	5
Saves	5	0
Fouls committed	18	15
Offsides	0	0
Yellow cards	2	3
Red cards	0	0

== Post-match ==
Ivory Coast won their third Africa Cup of Nations title. They became the first host nation to win the tournament since Egypt in the 2006 tournament, in which Ivory Coast finished as runners-up. Ivory Coast subsequently celebrated their victory with a parade on the streets of Abidjan, part of "huge celebrations across the country".

== See also ==
- 2023 Africa Cup of Nations knockout stage
