= 2023 Africa Cup of Nations Group A =

Football tournament group stage

Group A of the 2023 Africa Cup of Nations took place from 13 to 22 January 2024. The group consisted of hosts Ivory Coast, Guinea-Bissau, Nigeria, and Equatorial Guinea.

Equatorial Guinea and Nigeria as the top two teams, along with Ivory Coast as one of the four best third-placed teams, advanced to the round of 16.

== Teams ==
Draw position	Team	Zone	Method of qualification	Date of qualification	Finals appearance	Last appearance	Previous best performance	FIFA Rankings	
Draw position	Team	Zone	Method of qualification	Date of qualification	Finals appearance	Last appearance	Previous best performance	October 2023 (Note: The rankings of October 2023 were used for seeding for the final draw.)	December 2023
A1	Ivory Coast	WAFU	Hosts and Group H runners-up	30 January 2019	25th	2021	Winners (1992, 2015)	50	49
A2	Nigeria	WAFU	Group A winners	17 June 2023	20th	2021	Winners (1980, 1994, 2013)	40	42
A3	Equatorial Guinea	UNIFFAC	Group J runners-up	17 June 2023	4th	2021	Fourth place (2015)	92	88
A4	Guinea-Bissau	WAFU	Group A runners-up	18 June 2023	4th	2021	Group stage (2017, 2019, 2021)	106	103

== Standings ==
Pos	Team	Pld	W	D	L	GF	GA	GD	Pts	Qualification
1	Equatorial Guinea	3	2	1	0	9	3	+6	7 (Note: Tied on head-to-head points. Overall goal difference: Equatorial Guinea +6, Nigeria +2.)	Advance to knockout stage
2	Nigeria	3	2	1	0	3	1	+2	7	Advance to knockout stage
3	Ivory Coast (H)	3	1	0	2	2	5	−3	3	Advance to knockout stage
4	Guinea-Bissau	3	0	0	3	2	7	−5	0	

Source: CAF
Rules for classification: Group stage tiebreakers
(H) Hosts

== Matches ==
All times are local, GMT (UTC±0).

=== Ivory Coast vs Guinea-Bissau ===
The two teams had met once before, a 4–1 victory for Ivory Coast in the 2001 WAFU Nations Cup qualifying round. However, this match is not considered an "A" match by FIFA as the WAFU Nations Cup was a tournament in which national teams participated only with players from their local league. Therefore, this was the first international "A" match between the two teams. Ivorian forwards Sébastien Haller and Simon Adingra were unavailable for this match due to injuries.

Ivory Coast got off to a dream start with a Seko Fofana goal from outside the box in the 4th minute after Bissau-Guinean defenders failed to clear it out. The Ivorians increasingly asserted domination and added their second in the 58th minute, when a deflected cross by Franck Kessié was intercepted by Jean-Philippe Krasso, who skilfully controlled and struck home a volley to seal the three points.

13 January 2024
20:00

Ivory Coast	2–0	Guinea-Bissau
S. Fofana 4'; Krasso 58'	Report

Alassane Ouattara Stadium, Abidjan
Attendance: 36,858
Referee: Amin Omar (Egypt)

Ivory Coast	Guinea Bissau

GK	1	Yahia Fofana
RB	5	Wilfried Singo		(substituted off) 46'
CB	2	Ousmane Diomande		(substituted off) 77'
CB	21	Evan Ndicka	(yellow card) 29'
LB	3	Ghislain Konan
DM	18	Ibrahim Sangaré	(yellow card) 45+2'	(substituted off) 90+1'
CM	8	Franck Kessié (c)
CM	6	Seko Fofana
RF	13	Jérémie Boga
CF	11	Jean-Philippe Krasso		(substituted off) 61'
LF	9	Jonathan Bamba		(substituted off) 61'
Substitutions:
DF	17	Serge Aurier		(substituted on) 46'
FW	19	Nicolas Pépé		(substituted on) 61'
FW	10	Karim Konaté		(substituted on) 61'
DF	12	Willy Boly		(substituted on) 77'
MF	25	Idrissa Doumbia		(substituted on) 90+1'
Manager:
(France) Jean-Louis Gasset

GK	12	Ouparine Djoco
RB	15	Jefferson Encada
CB	22	Opa Sanganté
CB	4	Marcelo Djaló
LB	2	Fali Candé
DM	19	Janio Bikel
CM	16	Moreto Cassamá	(yellow card) 44'	(substituted off) 67'
CM	8	Alfa Semedo (c)
RF	14	Mauro Rodrigues		(substituted off) 75'
CF	17	Mama Baldé		(substituted off) 85'
LF	10	Carlos Mané		(substituted off) 67'
Substitutions:
FW	3	Franculino Djú		(substituted on) 67'
MF	13	Carlos Mendes Gomes		(substituted on) 67'
FW	24	Zé Turbo		(substituted on) 75'
FW	7	Dálcio		(substituted on) 85'
Manager:
Baciro Candé

Man of the Match:
Seko Fofana (Ivory Coast)

Assistant referees:
Mahmoud Ahmed Kamel (Egypt)
Ahmed Hossam Taha (Egypt)
Fourth official:
Mohamed Maarouf (Egypt)
Video assistant referee:
Mohamed Ashour (Egypt)
Assistant video assistant referee:
Mahmoud Elbana (Egypt)

=== Nigeria vs Equatorial Guinea ===
Nigeria and Equatorial Guinea met for the fourth time, with the first two meetings coming in six days in June 2008 during the second round of the 2010 FIFA World Cup qualification phase, with Nigeria winning 1–0 in Malabo, Equatorial Guinea, on 15 June 2008, and 2–0 in Abuja, Nigeria, on 21 June 2008. In addition, Nigeria defeated Equatorial Guinea 3–1 in a group stage finale at the 2018 African Nations Championship in Agadir, Morocco.

Equatorial Guinea proved more energetic over the early stages. It paid off in the 36th minute when Iban Salvador exquisitely guided the ball into the bottom corner from his position on the penalty spot. However, the lead was canceled out just two minutes later with a bullet header by Victor Osimhen from Ademola Lookman's floated delivery. Despite ramping up pressure later on, Nigeria failed to score and was forced to settle for a draw.

14 January 2024
14:00

Nigeria	1–1	Equatorial Guinea
Osimhen 38'	Report	Salvador 36'

Alassane Ouattara Stadium, Abidjan
Attendance: 8,500
Referee: Abongile Tom (South Africa)

Nigeria	Equatorial Guinea

GK	23	Stanley Nwabili
RB	2	Ola Aina		(substituted off) 83'
CB	5	William Troost-Ekong (c)
CB	6	Semi Ajayi
LB	3	Zaidu Sanusi	(yellow card) 65'	(substituted off) 83'
CM	8	Frank Onyeka
CM	4	Alhassan Yusuf		(substituted off) 69'
RW	15	Moses Simon		(substituted off) 69'
AM	17	Alex Iwobi		(substituted off) 90+4'
LW	18	Ademola Lookman
CF	9	Victor Osimhen
Substitutions:
FW	11	Samuel Chukwueze		(substituted on) 69'
MF	10	Joe Aribo		(substituted on) 69'
DF	12	Bright Osayi-Samuel		(substituted on) 83'
DF	21	Calvin Bassey		(substituted on) 83'
FW	14	Kelechi Iheanacho		(substituted on) 90+4'
Manager:
(Portugal) José Peseiro

GK	1	Jesús Owono
RB	15	Carlos Akapo
CB	21	Esteban Obiang
CB	16	Saúl Coco
LB	11	Basilio Ndong
CM	4	Federico Bikoro	(yellow card) 26'
CM	22	Pablo Ganet		(substituted off) 74'
RW	6	Iban Salvador		(substituted off) 90+3'
AM	7	José Machín		(substituted off) 86'
LW	8	Jannick Buyla		(substituted off) 75'
CF	10	Emilio Nsue (c)
Substitutions:
MF	14	Álex Balboa	(yellow card) 85'	(substituted on) 74'
FW	26	José Nabil Ondo		(substituted on) 75'
MF	20	Santiago Eneme		(substituted on) 86'
FW	19	Luis Nlavo		(substituted on) 90+3'
Manager:
Juan Micha

Man of the Match:
Jesús Owono (Equatorial Guinea)

Assistant referees:
Souru Phatsoane (Lesotho)
Liban Abdourazak (Djibouti)
Fourth official:
Liban Abdourazak (Ethiopia)
Video assistant referee:
Lahlou Benbraham (Algeria)
Assistant video assistant referee:
Maria Rivet (Mauritius)

=== Equatorial Guinea vs Guinea-Bissau ===
The teams had only met each other once, a 3–0 win for Equatorial Guinea in a friendly in Portugal in 2022.

It was Equatorial Guinea who struck first in the 21st minute due to poor concentration by Janio Bikel, who allowed Emilio Nsue through, and he converted with an expertly taken one-on-one finish. However, the Bissau-Guineans did not long to equalize as Esteban Obiang, in an attempt to clear a pass from Mauro Rodrigues, deflected it into his net instead. The second half, though, saw Equatorial Guinea seize the match when Josete Miranda sublimely volleyed his side back ahead right at the beginning of the second half, before Nsue completed his hat-trick, first slotting home his second goal at the back post courtesy of Basilio Ndong’s delicious delivery into the danger zone, before he clinically struck again ten minutes later. Zé Turbo scored a skillful goal in the second minute of extra time, but it proved too late for Guinea-Bissau.

At 34 years and 110 days, Emilio Nsue became the oldest player to score a hat-trick at the Africa Cup of Nations. Furthermore, the hat-trick was also the first at an Africa Cup of Nations since 21 January 2008, when Soufiane Alloudi recorded his hat-trick in a 5–1 victory for Morocco against Namibia.

Combined with the later result between Ivory Coast and Nigeria, this result meant Guinea-Bissau had been eliminated in the group stage for the fourth consecutive Africa Cup of Nations without a win.

18 January 2024
14:00

Equatorial Guinea	4–2	Guinea-Bissau
Nsue 21', 51', 61'; Miranda 46'	Report	Esteban 37' (o.g.); Zé Turbo 90+3'

Alassane Ouattara Stadium, Abidjan
Attendance: 13,888
Referee: Samuel Uwikunda (Rwanda)

Equatorial Guinea	Guinea Bissau

GK	1	Jesús Owono
RB	15	Carlos Akapo		(substituted off) 80'
CB	21	Esteban Obiang
CB	16	Saúl Coco
LB	11	Basilio Ndong
DM	4	Federico Bikoro
RM	6	Iban Salvador		(substituted off) 80'
CM	7	José Machín
CM	22	Pablo Ganet		(substituted off) 73'
LM	17	Josete Miranda		(substituted off) 80'
CF	10	Emilio Nsue (c)		(substituted off) 84'
Substitutions:
MF	20	Santiago Eneme		(substituted on) 73'
DF	3	Marvin Anieboh		(substituted on) 80'
FW	19	Luis Nlavo	(yellow card) 83'	(substituted on) 80'
MF	8	Jannick Buyla	(yellow card) 90+5'	(substituted on) 80'
FW	18	Noé Ela		(substituted on) 84'
Manager:
Juan Micha

GK	12	Ouparine Djoco
RB	15	Jefferson Encada
CB	4	Marcelo Djaló
CB	20	Sori Mané (c)
LB	2	Fali Candé
CM	8	Alfa Semedo	(substituted off) 86'
CM	19	Janio Bikel
CM	16	Moreto Cassamá	(substituted off) 64'
RW	14	Mauro Rodrigues	(substituted off) 77'
CF	3	Franculino Djú	(substituted off) 77'
LW	17	Mama Baldé	(substituted off) 63'
Substitutions:
FW	11	Marciano Tchami	(substituted on) 63'
MF	13	Carlos Mendes Gomes	(substituted on) 64'
FW	24	Zé Turbo	(substituted on) 77'
FW	7	Dálcio	(substituted on) 77'
MF	10	Carlos Mané	(substituted on) 86'
Manager:
Baciro Candé

Man of the Match:
Emilio Nsue (Equatorial Guinea)

Assistant referees:
Dimbiniaina Andriatianarivelo (Madagascar)
Jonathan Ahonto (Togo)
Fourth official:
Imtehaz Heeralall (Mauritius)
Video assistant referee:
Haythem Guirat (Tunisia)
Assistant video assistant referee:
Peter Waweru (Kenya)

=== Ivory Coast vs Nigeria ===
The two national teams met each other for the first time since 2015, while the last time they played competitively back in 2013 had seen Nigeria win 2–1.

After a goalless first half with full of drama and ferocity from the hosts and Nigerians, a foul by Ousmane Diomande on Victor Osimhen resulted in William Troost-Ekong converting a penalty in the 55th minute, which secured Nigeria's win.

18 January 2024
17:00

Ivory Coast	0–1	Nigeria
	Report	Troost-Ekong 55' (pen.)

Alassane Ouattara Stadium, Abidjan
Attendance: 49,517
Referee: Mustapha Ghorbal (Algeria)

Ivory Coast	Nigeria

GK	1	Yahia Fofana
RB	21	Evan Ndicka
CB	2	Ousmane Diomande
LB	3	Ghislain Konan	(substituted off) 80'
DM	6	Seko Fofana
RM	17	Serge Aurier	(substituted off) 67'
CM	8	Franck Kessié
CM	20	Christian Kouamé	(substituted off) 67'
LM	18	Ibrahim Sangaré
SS	13	Jérémie Boga	(substituted off) 67'
CF	11	Jean-Philippe Krasso	(substituted off) 84'
Substitutions:
FW	19	Nicolas Pépé	(substituted on) 67'
FW	9	Jonathan Bamba	(substituted on) 67'
DF	5	Wilfried Singo	(substituted on) 67'
FW	14	Oumar Diakité	(substituted on) 80'
DF	10	Karim Konaté	(substituted on) 84'
Manager:
(France) Jean-Louis Gasset

GK	23	Stanley Nwabili	(yellow card) 90+2'
RB	2	Ola Aina
CB	6	Semi Ajayi
CB	5	William Troost-Ekong
LB	3	Zaidu Sanusi		(substituted off) 80'
DM	8	Frank Onyeka
DM	21	Calvin Bassey
RW	18	Ademola Lookman		(substituted off) 79'
AM	17	Alex Iwobi
LW	11	Samuel Chukwueze		(substituted off) 72'
CF	9	Victor Osimhen		(substituted off) 88'
Substitutions:
FW	15	Moses Simon		(substituted on) 72'
MF	12	Bright Osayi-Samuel		(substituted on) 79'
DF	22	Kenneth Omeruo		(substituted on) 80'
FW	19	Paul Onuachu		(substituted on) 88'
Manager:
(Portugal) José Peseiro

Man of the Match:
Victor Osimhen (Nigeria)

Assistant referees:
Abbes Zerhouni (Algeria)
Nouha Bangoura (Senegal)
Fourth official:
Jean-Jacques Ndala (DR Congo)
Video assistant referee:
Lahlou Benbraham (Algeria)
Assistant video assistant referee:
Mokrane Gourari (Algeria)

=== Equatorial Guinea vs Ivory Coast ===
This was their second meeting at the AFCON, after their previous encounter back in 2021 where Ivory Coast won 1–0.

The Ivorians made a bright start but could not capitalise, and they were made to pay in the 42nd minute when Carlos Akapo was allowed to drive into the area and play a low pass across to Emilio Nsue who rolled the ball into the net. Ivory Coast thought they had an equaliser on the stroke of half time, but Ibrahim Sangaré was flagged offside. In the second half, Jean-Philippe Krasso found the back of the net yet he too was flagged offside. Pablo Ganet then struck a free kick in the 73rd minute to give Equatorial Guinea their second, before a counter-attack two minutes later saw Nsue secure the match for the Equatoguineans with a clinical finish after receiving the ball from José Machín. The Ivorians’ misery was completed when Jannick Buyla finished from a rebound in the 88th minute.

This was Equatorial Guinea's biggest win in their AFCON history, while Ivory Coast had become the first host country to concede four goals in a group stage at the AFCON. Despite this humiliation, Ivory Coast nevertheless advanced past the group stage, thanked to Zambia losing 0–1 to Morocco in the Group F fixture.

22 January 2024
17:00

Equatorial Guinea	4–0	Ivory Coast
Nsue 42', 75'; Ganet 73'; Buyla 88'	Report

Alassane Ouattara Stadium, Abidjan
Attendance: 42,550
Referee: Mahmood Ismail (Sudan)

Equatorial Guinea	Ivory Coast

GK	1	Jesús Owono	(yellow card) 45+5'
RB	15	Carlos Akapo
CB	21	Esteban Obiang
CB	16	Saúl Coco
LB	11	Basilio Ndong
RM	6	Iban Salvador		(substituted off) 78'
CM	22	Pablo Ganet		(substituted off) 85'
CM	4	Federico Bikoro
LM	17	Josete Miranda	(yellow card) 12'	(substituted off) 56'
AM	7	José Machín		(substituted off) 85'
CF	10	Emilio Nsue (c)		(substituted off) 78'
Substitutions:
MF	8	Jannick Buyla		(substituted on) 56'
FW	27	Óscar Siafá		(substituted on) 78'
FW	19	Luis Asué		(substituted on) 78'
MF	20	Santiago Eneme	(yellow card) 88'	(substituted on) 85'
MF	14	Álex Balboa		(substituted on) 85'
Manager:
Juan Micha

GK	1	Yahia Fofana
RB	5	Wilfried Singo
CB	12	Willy Boly	(yellow card) 72'	(substituted off) 83'
CB	21	Evan Ndicka
LB	3	Ghislain Konan		(substituted off) 64'
CM	18	Ibrahim Sangaré
CM	8	Franck Kessié
CM	6	Seko Fofana
RW	14	Oumar Diakité		(substituted off) 83'
CF	19	Nicolas Pépé		(substituted off) 65'
LW	20	Christian Kouamé	(yellow card) 45+5'	(substituted off) 65'
Substitutions:
FW	10	Karim Konaté		(substituted on) 64'
FW	11	Jean-Philippe Krasso		(substituted on) 65'
MF	13	Jérémie Boga		(substituted on) 65'
MF	15	Max Gradel		(substituted on) 83'
MF	24	Simon Adingra		(substituted on) 83'
Manager:
(France) Jean-Louis Gasset

Man of the Match:
Jesús Owono (Equatorial Guinea)

Assistant referees:
Ibrahim Mohamed (Sudan)
Arsenio Marengula (Mozambique)
Fourth official:
Abdel Aziz Bouh (Mauritania)
Video assistant referee:
Mahmoud Ashour (Egypt)
Assistant video assistant referee:
Mahmoud El Banna (Egypt)

=== Guinea-Bissau vs Nigeria ===
Guinea-Bissau and Nigeria met for only the fourth time, and all have come within the past two years. The first meeting came in the group stage finale of the 2021 Africa Cup of Nations in Garoua, Cameroon, where goals from Umar Sadiq and William Troost-Ekong gave Nigeria a 2–0 victory and eliminated Guinea-Bissau from the tournament. The nations also met in qualification for the 2023 Africa Cup of Nations, with Guinea-Bissau recording a 1–0 victory on 24 March 2023, in Abuja, Nigeria, courtesy of a goal from Mama Balde. Nigeria won in Bissau three days later, with Moses Simon's penalty kick being the only score in that match.

Guinea-Bissau mounted fierce resistance against Nigeria, but in a clumsy attempt to clear out in the 36th minute, Opa Sanganté ended up scoring an own goal, which turned out to be the only goal of the match as Nigeria emerged victorious.

This loss meant Guinea-Bissau lost all three matches at the group stage for the first time and remained winless after participating in four tournaments.

22 January 2024
17:00

Guinea-Bissau	0–1	Nigeria
	Report	Sanganté 36' (o.g.)

Felix Houphouet Boigny Stadium, Abidjan
Attendance: 15,650
Referee: Bouchra Karboubi (Morocco)

Guinea-Bissau	Nigeria

GK	1	Jonas Mendes (c)
RB	5	Houboulang Mendes
CB	25	Edgar Ié
CB	22	Opa Sanganté
LB	21	Nanu	(substituted off) 80'
CM	19	Janio Bikel
CM	6	Nito Gomes
RW	18	Famana Quizera	(substituted off) 68'
AM	7	Dálcio	(substituted off) 88'
LW	13	Carlos Mendes Gomes	(substituted off) 46'
CF	9	Zinho Gano	(substituted off) 46'
Substitutions:
FW	11	Marciano Sanca	(substituted on) 46'
FW	3	Franculino Djú	(substituted on) 46'
FW	24	Zé Turbo	(substituted on) 68'
DF	2	Fali Candé	(substituted on) 80'
MF	8	Alfa Semedo	(substituted on) 88'
Manager:
Baciro Candé

GK	23	Stanley Nwabili
CB	6	Semi Ajayi	(yellow card) 44'
CB	22	Kenneth Omeruo (c)
CB	21	Calvin Bassey	(yellow card) 90+4'
RWB	12	Bright Osayi-Samuel		(substituted off) 80'
CM	8	Frank Onyeka	(yellow card) 50'	(substituted off) 63'
CM	10	Joe Aribo		(substituted off) 63'
LWB	2	Ola Aina		(substituted off) 90+4'
AM	11	Samuel Chukwueze		(substituted off) 80'
AM	15	Moses Simon
CF	9	Victor Osimhen
Substitutions:
MF	25	Raphael Onyedika		(substituted on) 63'
MF	17	Alex Iwobi		(substituted on) 63'
FW	18	Ademola Lookman		(substituted on) 80'
DF	3	Zaidu Sanusi		(substituted on) 80'
DF	20	Chidozie Awaziem		(substituted on) 90+4'
Manager:
(Portugal) José Peseiro

Man of the Match:
Moses Simon (Nigeria)

Assistant referees:
Carine Atezambong (Cameroon)
Diana Chicotesha (Zambia)
Fourth official:
Jalal Jayed (Morocco)
Video assistant referee:
Rédouane Jiyed (Morocco)
Assistant video assistant referee:
Zakaria Brinsi (Morocco)

== Discipline ==
Fair play points would have been used as tiebreakers if the overall and head-to-head records of teams were tied. These were calculated based on yellow and red cards received in all group matches as follows:

Only one of the above deductions was applied to a player in a single match.

Team	Match 1				Match 2				Match 3				Points
Team	Booked	(yellow card) (yellow-red card)	Sent off (straight red)	(yellow card) (red card)	Booked	(yellow card) (yellow-red card)	Sent off (straight red)	(yellow card) (red card)	Booked	(yellow card) (yellow-red card)	Sent off (straight red)	(yellow card) (red card)	Points
Ivory Coast	2								2				–4
Nigeria	1				1				3				–5
Equatorial Guinea	2				2				3				–7
Guinea-Bissau	1												–1
