= Dahane Beida =

Mauritanian football referee (born 1991)

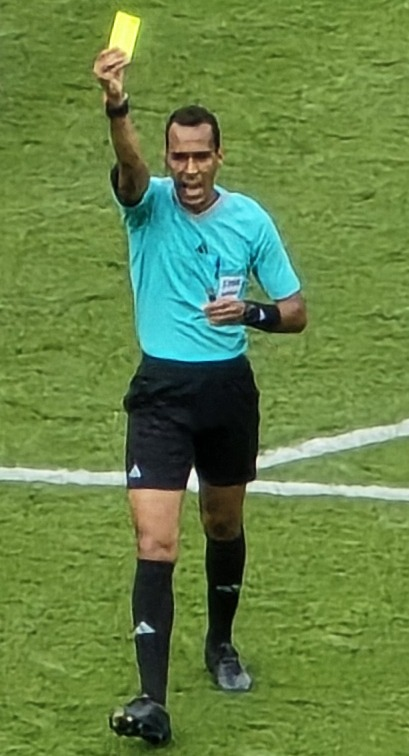
- Beida shows a yellow card during a match at the 2024 Summer Olympics
- Full name: Dahane Beida
- Born: 31 December 1991 (age 34); Mauritania

Domestic
Years	League	Role
2018–present	Super D1	Referee

International
Years	League	Role
2018–present	FIFA	Referee
2018–present	CAF	Referee

Dahane Beida (Arabic: دحان بيده; born 31 December 1991) is a Mauritanian football referee who officiates in the Super D1 and who has been a FIFA-listed international referee since 2018.

== Biography ==
Born in Mauritania, Beida is considered a prominent referee in the CAF tournaments and has overseen notable matches like the final of the 2023 Africa Cup of Nations between the Ivory Coast and Nigeria, as well as the second leg of the 2025 CAF Confederation Cup final between Simba S.C. and RS Berkane and other matches at the CAF Champions League.

In 2019, Beida officiated in another final at a major CAF tournament, when he led the U-17 Africa Cup of Nations final match between Guinea and Cameroon at the National Stadium in Dar es Salaam, Tanzania. At the 2021 Africa Cup of Nations, Beida refereed two group stage matches.

In 2020, Beida was selected as a support (fourth) referee for the men's tournament at the Tokyo Summer Olympics and, in 2023, he was assigned as a video assistant referee at the U-20 Africa Cup of Nations in Egypt.

In 2024, Beida was named again for another Olympic tournament, this time at the Paris Summer Olympics, where oversaw three matches: two of group-stage (Uzbekistan v. Spain and Argentina v. Ukraine), as well as a quarter-final game between Japan and Spain.

Beida has also been a prominent referee at club-level tournaments, being selected for the 2025 FIFA Club World Cup in the United States, where he led two group-stage games, including a Real Madrid victory over the Austrian club Red Bull Salzburg.

He is also a referee in the CAF qualification for the 2026 FIFA World Cup, and oversaw games during the qualification for the 2022 edition in Qatar.

Beida was selected for the 2025 Africa Cup of Nations in Morocco. He made his first appearance in the Group C game between Nigeria and Tanzania, and oversaw the Round of 16 match between Senegal and Sudan. On 9 January 2026, Beida refereed the quarter-final match between Cameroon and hosts Morocco.

Beida was selected to officiate at the 2026 FIFA World Cup.

== Selected record ==
2023 Africa Cup of Nations
Date	Match	Venue	Round
14 January 2024	Egypt 2–2 Mozambique	Felix Houphouet Boigny Stadium	Group stage
27 January 2024	Angola 3–0 Namibia	Stade de la Paix	Round of 16
11 February 2024	Nigeria 1–2 Ivory Coast	Alassane Ouattara Stadium	Final
2024 Summer Olympics – Men's tournament
Date	Match	Venue	Round
24 July 2024	Uzbekistan 1–2 Spain	Parc des Princes	Group stage
30 July 2024	Ukraine 0–2 Argentina	Parc Olympique Lyonnais	Group stage
2 August 2024	Japan 0–3 Spain	Parc Olympique Lyonnais	Quarter-finals
2025 Africa Cup of Nations
Date	Match	Venue	Round
23 December 2025	Nigeria 2–1 Tanzania	Fez Stadium	Group stage
3 January 2026	Senegal 3–1 Sudan	Tangier Grand Stadium	Round of 16
9 January 2026	Cameroon 0–2 Morocco	Prince Moulay Abdellah Stadium	Quarter-finals
2026 FIFA World Cup
Date	Match	Venue	Round
16 June 2026	Austria 3–1 Jordan	Levi's Stadium	Group stage
