= Simon Adingra =

Ivorian footballer (born 2002)

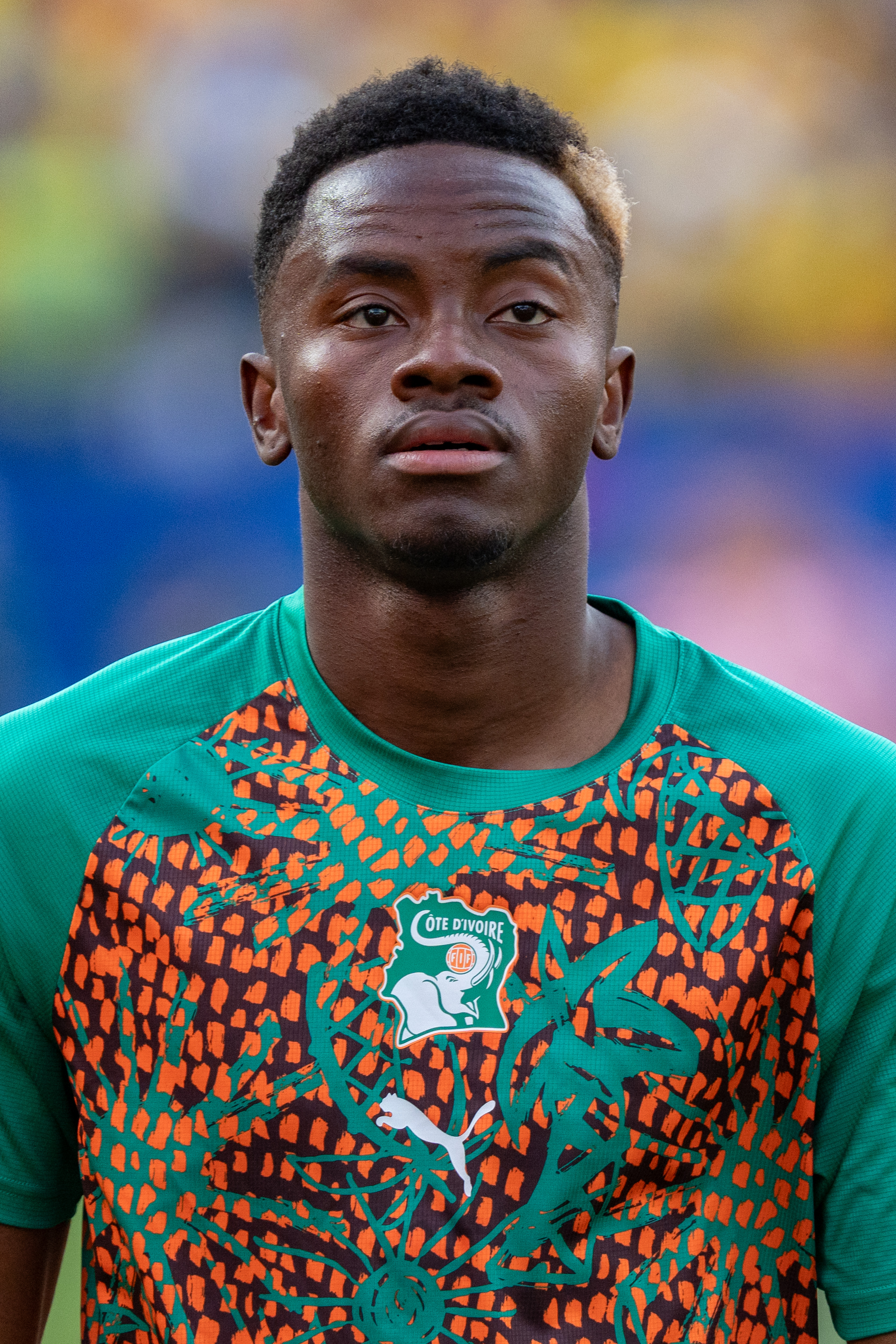
- Adingra with the Ivory Coast in 2026

Personal information
- Date of birth: 1 January 2002 (age 24)
- Place of birth: Abidjan, Ivory Coast
- Height: 1.75 m (5 ft 9 in)
- Position: Winger

Team information
- Current team: Ajax (on loan from Sunderland)
- Number: 7

Youth career
- Right to Dream
- 2020–2021: Nordsjælland

Senior career*
Years	Team	Apps	(Gls)
2021–2022	Nordsjælland	38	(11)
2022–2025	Brighton & Hove Albion	60	(8)
2022–2023	→ Union SG (loan)	36	(11)
2025–	Sunderland	14	(1)
2026	→ Monaco (loan)	14	(3)
2026–	→ Ajax (loan)	1	(0)

International career^{‡}
2023–	Ivory Coast	30	(5)
Medal record
Men's football
Representing Ivory Coast
Africa Cup of Nations
Winner	2023 Ivory Coast
- * Club domestic league appearances and goals as of 10 October 2026 ‡ National team caps and goals as of 20 June 2026

Simon Adingra (born 1 January 2002) is an Ivorian professional footballer who plays as a winger for Eredivisie club Ajax, on loan from Premier League club Sunderland, and the Ivory Coast national team.

== Club career ==
=== Early career ===
Adingra was born in Abobo, a suburb of Abidjan. A former player of the Right to Dream Academy, Adingra joined Danish club Nordsjælland in January 2020. He made his professional debut on 18 April 2021 in a 2–2 league draw against Copenhagen. He replaced Ivan Mesík at the 68th minute of the game and went on to score his team's second goal.

=== Brighton and Hove Albion ===
On 24 June 2022, Adingra transferred to Premier League club Brighton & Hove Albion, signing a four-year contract. Ten days later, Adingra joined Brighton's Belgian sister club Union SG on loan for the 2022–23 season.

Adingra made his Brighton debut as a substitute in the opening game of the 2023–24 season on 12 August. He scored the Seagulls' third goal in an eventual 4–1 home win over newly promoted Luton Town. During that same season, Adingra made his first Premier League start on 16 September in a 3–1 victory over Manchester United in which he recorded an assist.

Upon returning to Brighton after winning the 2023 AFCON title, Adingra would score a brace in a 5–0 win against Sheffield United on 18 February 2024.

=== Sunderland ===
On 10 July 2025, Adingra joined fellow Premier League club Sunderland, signing a five-year contract. On 28 December 2025, he scored his first goal for the club in a 1–1 draw at home against Leeds United.

==== Loan to Monaco ====
On 2 February 2026, Sunderland announced that Adingra had been loaned to Ligue 1 club Monaco for the rest of the season.

==== Loan to Ajax ====
On 2 September 2026, Adingra was loaned to Eredivisie club Ajax for the 2026–27 season with an option to buy.

== International career ==
In March 2023, Adingra received his first call-up to the Ivory Coast senior national team for two Africa Cup of Nations qualification matches against Comoros.

On 3 February 2024, Adingra scored a 90th-minute equaliser in an eventual extra-time 2–1 win against Mali in the quarter-finals of 2023 Africa Cup of Nations. On 11 February, he provided two assists and was named as man of the match in the tournament's final against Nigeria, which ended in a 2–1 victory for Ivory Coast.

On May 15, 2026, Adingra was integrated by Ivory Coast coach Emerse Faé in his list of 26 players in order to participate in the 2026 World Cup.

== Career statistics ==
=== Club ===
As of match played 10 October 2026

Appearances and goals by club, season and competition
Club	Season	League			National cup (Note: Includes Danish Cup, Belgian Cup, FA Cup, Coupe de France)		League cup (Note: Includes EFL Cup)		Europe		Total	
Club	Season	Division	Apps	Goals	Apps	Goals	Apps	Goals	Apps	Goals	Apps	Goals
Nordsjælland	2020–21	Danish Superliga	7	2	0	0	—		—		7	2
Nordsjælland	2021–22	Danish Superliga	31	9	2	1	—		—		33	10
Nordsjælland	Total		38	11	2	1	—		—		40	12
Union SG (loan)	2022–23	Belgian Pro League	36	11	4	3	—		11 (Note: Two appearances in UEFA Champions League, nine appearances and one goal in UEFA Europa League)	1	51	15
Brighton & Hove Albion	2023–24	Premier League	31	6	1	0	0	0	8 (Note: Appearances in UEFA Europa League)	1	40	7
Brighton & Hove Albion	2024–25	Premier League	29	2	1	0	3	3	—		33	5
Brighton & Hove Albion	Total		60	8	2	0	3	3	8	1	73	12
Sunderland	2025–26	Premier League	14	1	1	0	0	0	—		15	1
Monaco (loan)	2025–26	Ligue 1	14	3	1	0	—		2 (Note: Appearances in UEFA Champions League)	0	17	3
Ajax (loan)	2026–27	Eredivisie	1	0	0	0	—		0	0	1	0
Career total			163	34	10	4	3	3	21	2	197	43

=== International ===
As of match played 20 June 2026

Appearances and goals by national team and year
National team	Year	Apps	Goals
Ivory Coast	2023	5	1
Ivory Coast	2024	13	2
Ivory Coast	2025	8	1
Ivory Coast	2026	4	1
Total		30	5

Scores and results list Ivory Coast's goal tally first, score column indicates score after each Adingra goal.

List of international goals scored by Simon Adingra
No.	Date	Venue	Opponent	Score	Result	Competition	Ref.
1	17 November 2023	Alassane Ouattara Stadium, Abidjan, Ivory Coast	Seychelles	3–0	9–0	2026 FIFA World Cup qualification	
2	3 February 2024	Stade de la Paix, Bouaké, Ivory Coast	Mali	1–1	2–1 (a.e.t.)	2023 Africa Cup of Nations	
3	19 November 2024	Felix Houphouet Boigny Stadium, Abidjan, Ivory Coast	Chad	2–0	4–0	2025 Africa Cup of Nations qualification	
4	10 October 2025	Côte d'Or National Sports Complex, Saint Pierre, Mauritius	Seychelles	6–0	7–0	2026 FIFA World Cup qualification	
5	28 March 2026	Stadium MK, Milton Keynes, England	South Korea	2–0	4–0	Friendly	

== Honours ==
Ivory Coast

- Africa Cup of Nations: 2023

Individual

- Africa Cup of Nations Best Young Player: 2023
