= Gilbert Cheruiyot =

Kenyan soccer referee

- Full name: Gilbert Kipkoech Cheruiyot
- Born: 24 July 1984 (age 42); Lembus Kiptoim, Baringo County, Kenya

Domestic
Years	League	Role
2008 – present	Kenyan Premier League	Referee

International
Years	League	Role
2013 – present	CAF	Assistant referee

Gilbert Cheruiyot (born 24 July 1984) is a Kenyan football assistant referee. He has been a referee in the Kenyan Premier League since 2008 and a FIFA listed referee since 2013.

== Early life ==
Cheruiyot was born in Lembus Kiptoim ward in Mogotio Constituency, located in Baringo County. He trained as a referee in 2006, and started out by officiating local village football tournaments, rising to the regional leagues, National Super League and eventually the Football Kenya Federation Premier League matches.

== Career ==
Cheruiyot started his career as a referee in 2008. In 2013, he joined Kenyan Premier League and in 2013, he was listed as a FIFA assistant referee.

He has served as first and second assistant referee in various CAF and FIFA tournaments, such as the 2024, 2022 and 2026 FIFA World Cup World Cup Qualifiers, 2020 Tokyo Olympic Games, 2019, 2019 and 2023 Africa Cup of Nations, and the 2017 U-20 Africa Cup of Nations

Since 2018, Cheruiyot has officiated a number of CAF Champions League games, and was chosen as an assistant referee for the 2021 and 2023 Africa Cup of Nations held in Cameroon and Côte d'Ivoire respectively.
