= Marciano Tchami =

Bissau-Guinean footballer

Marciano
Personal information
- Full name: Marciano Sanca Tchami
- Date of birth: 3 March 2004 (age 22)
- Place of birth: Bissau, Guinea-Bissau
- Height: 1.80 m (5 ft 11 in)
- Position: Striker

Team information
- Current team: Almería B
- Number: 7

Youth career
- MEPA Academy
- 2019–2020: Gil Vicente
- 2020–2021: Leixões
- 2022–2023: Almería

Senior career*
| Years | Team | Apps | (Gls) |
| 2022–2023 | Almería B | 45 | (21) |
| 2023– | Almería | 6 | (0) |
| 2024 | → Alcorcón (loan) | 11 | (0) |
| 2024–2025 | → Betis B (loan) | 18 | (0) |
| 2025– | → Almería B | 30 | (6) |

International career^{‡}
| 2023– | Guinea-Bissau | 3 | (0) |
- * Club domestic league appearances and goals as of 16 May 2026 ‡ National team caps and goals as of 22 January 2024

Marciano Sanca Tchami (born 3 March 2004), simply known as Marciano, is a Bissau-Guinean professional footballer who plays as a striker for Spanish Segunda Federación club Almería B and the Guinea-Bissau national team.

== Club career ==
=== Youth career ===
Born in Bissau, Guinea-Bissau, Marciano played for local MEPA Academy as a youth. His talent wouldn't go unnoticed as in 2019, he was offered to go to Portugal to play for Gil Vicente and later on for Leixões.

=== Almería ===
On 22 January 2022, Marciano signed for UD Almería B on an undisclosed fee with his contract expiring in 2024 and a release clause of 40 million euros. He made an impressive start to his B team career by scoring two goals against CD Intergym Melilla within just three minutes of coming on as a substitute, with one goal in the 31st minute and the other in the 60th minute of the match. He maintained his prolific form and emerged as the top goalscorer for his team, despite starting only ten games in the season. He scored in five consecutive games.

Marciano began the 2023 pre-season with the first team, but suffered an injury which kept him out until September. He made his professional – and La Liga – debut on 6 October 2023, replacing Ibrahima Koné in a 3–0 away loss to Athletic Bilbao.

On 31 January 2024, Marciano renewed his contract with the Rojiblancos until 2028 and was loaned to Segunda División side AD Alcorcón for the remainder of the season. On 14 August, he moved to Betis Deportivo Balompié in Primera Federación also in a temporary deal.

== International career ==
On 4 October 2023, Marciano was called up to the Guinea-Bissau national team for two friendlies against Guinea and Togo.

== Style of play ==
Marciano is described as having good off-ball movements and dribbling that help him beat the opposition. He has good passing which is most effective when in the opposition box, making him a more complete forward.
