= Emerse Faé =

Ivorian-French football manager (born 1984)

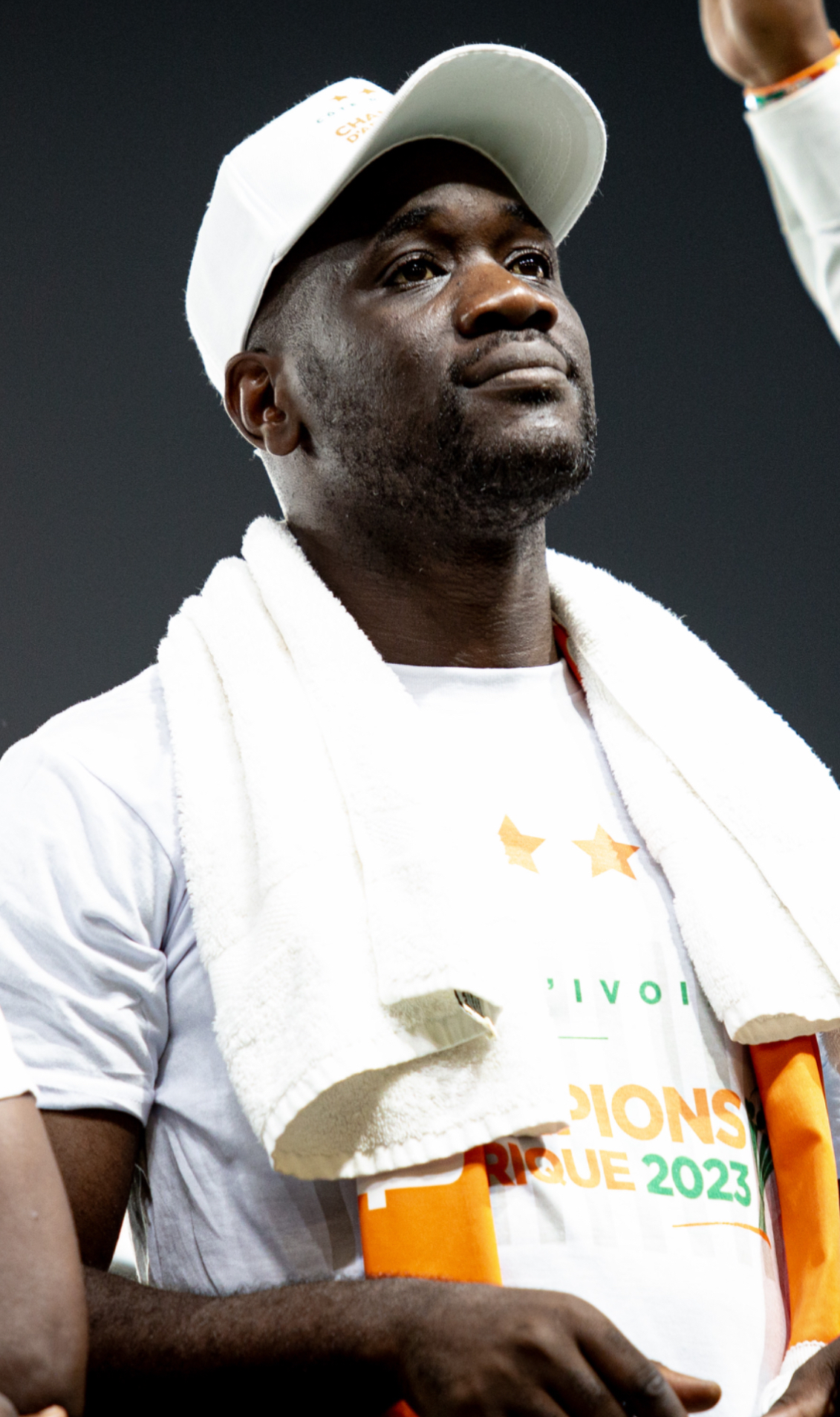
- Faé in 2024

Personal information
- Full name: Emerse Faé
- Date of birth: 24 January 1984 (age 42)
- Place of birth: Nantes, France
- Height: 1.73 m (5 ft 8 in)
- Position: Midfielder

Youth career
- 1990–1994: Malakoff
- 1994–1995: Toutes-Aides
- 1995–2003: Nantes

Senior career*
Years	Team	Apps	(Gls)
2003–2007	Nantes	106	(7)
2007–2009	Reading	8	(0)
2008–2009	→ Nice (loan)	32	(3)
2009–2012	Nice	57	(7)
Total		203	(17)

International career
2004	France U21	8	(0)
2005–2012	Ivory Coast	41	(1)

Managerial career
- 2021–2022: Clermont B
- 2022–2024: Ivory Coast U23
- 2024–2026: Ivory Coast
Medal record
Men's football
Representing Ivory Coast (as manager)
Africa Cup of Nations
Winner	2023
Representing Ivory Coast (as player)
Africa Cup of Nations
Runner-up	2006
- * Club domestic league appearances and goals

Emerse Faé (born 24 January 1984) is a professional football manager and former player. He last served as the head coach of the Ivory Coast national team. Born in France, he played as a midfielder and represented the Ivory Coast at senior international level. After winning the 2023 Africa Cup of Nations, he became the first manager in history to win a tournament after taking charge mid-competition.

== Club career ==
=== Youth career ===
Born in Nantes, Faé started his youth career with FC Toutes Aides, before moving to Nantes in 1999.

=== Nantes ===
Faé's senior career started in 2003 with his home town club, Nantes, who were then in Ligue 1. He made his European debut on 26 July 2003, in a 3–2 loss in the third round of the UEFA Intertoto Cup. In August 2003, he debuted in Ligue 1, in a 0–0 draw against Bordeaux. In the Coupe de la Ligue Final 2004, he started for Nantes, which eventually lost on penalties. He went on to play over 100 league games for them. On 9 May 2007, Nantes were relegated from Ligue 1 and he handed in a transfer request.

=== Reading ===
During the summer 2007 transfer window, Faé was strongly linked with a move to Premier League club Reading, and eventually completed a £2.5m move on 2 August 2007, signing a three-year contract, with the option of a fourth. He was given the number 20 shirt. He made his Premier League debut for Reading as a makeshift right midfielder in the 3–0 defeat at Bolton Wanderers on 25 August 2007.

Faé contracted malaria while on Africa Cup of Nations duty, and fell ill in the buildup to Reading's match away to Middlesbrough on 1 March 2008. He flew back south for medical treatment and had blood tests on 2 March, which revealed the disease.

After failing to break into the Reading first team, Faé refused to play for the reserve team against Tottenham Hotspur reserves along with Ibrahima Sonko. Both were fined two weeks wages and suspended for two weeks, therefore missing the last two league games of the season, which ended with Reading being relegated.

Faé then flew back to France with both Steve Coppell and himself saying that he would never play for Reading again.

During his time with Reading, he started in only six games.

=== Nice ===
In June 2008, he was loaned to Ligue 1 side Nice, with a view to a permanent transfer. He made his debut for his new club on 9 August, in a 1–0 defeat to Le Havre, and on 20 September, he scored his first goal in a 2–2 draw against Le Mans.

On 29 January 2009, it was confirmed that Faé had completed a permanent move to Nice for an undisclosed fee. On 18 October 2009, Faé was sent off with a second yellow card, after he directed abusive language towards the referee in a 4–1 loss against Lorient. He was suspended for three matches by the league. Nice also promised to discipline him internally.

On 1 February 2012, Faé announced his retirement from football at age 28, due to ongoing problems with phlebitis.

== International career ==
As a teenager, Faé played football for the French U17 and U21 teams. He debuted for the French U17 team in an 8–0 win over Liechtenstein on 26 February 2001, and was in the team that won the 2001 FIFA U-17 World Championship in Trinidad and Tobago.

However, in 2005, following a FIFA rule change concerning national team eligibility, Faé switched allegiances from France to Ivory Coast, the country from which his parents had come. He received his first call up to the Ivory Coast national team for a World Cup qualifier against Benin on 27 March 2005. He made his debut in the 3–0 win.

Faé scored his only goal for the Ivory Coast in a 1–1 draw against Switzerland on 27 May 2006, when he fired in a 30-yard shot, two minutes after coming on.

Faé went on to play at the 2006 African Cup of Nations, appearing at every match for a total of 452 minutes. He reached the final losing to Egypt in a penalty shootout. Although he had scored during the shootout vs Cameroon, Fae did not participate to the shootout in the final. He was also called up for the country in the 2006 FIFA World Cup, however, he did not play any minute during the tournament under coach Henri Michel. He was called up to the Ivory Coast 23-man squad for the 2008 Africa Cup of Nations, and made his first appearance at the tournament in the Elephants' 3–0 victory over Mali on 29 January 2008. He started and was subbed in the semifinal lost to Egypt. He was also selected for the 2010 African Cup of Nations, in which he appeared twice as a substitute.

Faé was also selected in the preliminary Ivory Coast squad for the 2010 FIFA World Cup, but was eventually dropped along with Bakari Koné and Gilles Yapi Yapo, who played with him in the 2006 World Cup.

== Managerial career ==
During the 2012–13 season, Faé joined the training center of his former club Nice in order to obtain his football coaching diplomas. After three seasons, he coached their under-17, and then the under-19 in 2018–19. On 8 July 2021, he became the head coach of Clermont reserve team.

On 20 May 2022, he became the manager of Ivory Coast U23, and assistant coach of the senior side under Jean-Louis Gasset. On 24 January 2024, Faé was appointed as caretaker of the Ivory Coast starting from the 2023 Africa Cup of Nations round of 16, following the dismissal of Gasset. He then led his country to defeat the defending champions Senegal on penalties, Mali after extra-time, and DR Congo in the semi-finals. Eventually, Ivory Coast clinched the title after a 2–1 victory over Nigeria in the final. He was also awarded the Best Coach of the 2023 AFCON tournament.

In October 2025, on the final matchday at the African qualifiers, he led Ivory Coast to qualify for the 2026 FIFA World Cup, marking their return to the world stage after 12-year drought. He guided his team to the quarter-finals of the 2025 Africa Cup of Nations. Under his leadership, the nation reached the knockout stage of the 2026 World Cup for the first time in its history, before being eliminated by Norway with a 2–1 defeat in the round of 32. He left his role as national team manager after his contract expired on 31 July 2026.

== Career statistics ==
=== Club ===
Appearances and goals by club, season and competition
Club	Season	League			National cup		League cup		Continental		Total	
Club	Season	Division	Apps	Goals	Apps	Goals	Apps	Goals	Apps	Goals	Apps	Goals
Nantes	2003–04	Ligue 1	25	1	2	0	4	0	1	0	32	1
Nantes	2004–05	Ligue 1	28	1	2	0	1	0	2	0	33	1
Nantes	2005–06	Ligue 1	29	4	3	0	1	0	0	0	33	4
Nantes	2006–07	Ligue 1	24	1	3	0	1	0	0	0	28	1
Nantes	Total		106	7	10	0	7	0	3	0	126	7
Reading	2007–08	Premier League	8	0	1	0	2	0	0	0	11	0
Nice (loan)	2008–09	Ligue 1	32	3	0	0	2	0	0	0	34	3
Nice	2009–10	Ligue 1	29	4	0	0	1	0	0	0	30	4
Nice	2010–11	Ligue 1	24	3	4	0	1	0	0	0	29	3
Nice	2011–12	Ligue 1	4	0	0	0	0	0	0	0	4	0
Nice	Total		57	7	4	0	2	0	0	0	63	7
Career total			203	17	15	0	13	0	3	0	234	17

=== International ===
Appearances and goals by national team and year
National team	Year	Apps	Goals
Ivory Coast	2005	4	0
Ivory Coast	2006	11	1
Ivory Coast	2007	4	0
Ivory Coast	2008	12	0
Ivory Coast	2009	2	0
Ivory Coast	2010	7	0
Ivory Coast	2011	1	0
Total		41	1

Scores and results list Ivory Coast's goal tally first, score column indicates score after each Faé goal.

List of international goals scored by Emerse Faé
No.	Date	Venue	Opponent	Score	Result	Competition
1	27 May 2006	Basel, Switzerland	Switzerland	1–1	1–1	Friendly

== Managerial statistics ==
As of match played 30 June 2026

Managerial record by team and tenure
Team	Nat.	From	To	Record								Ref.
Team	Nat.	From	To	G	W	D	L	GF	GA	GD	Win %	Ref.
Ivory Coast	(Ivory Coast)	24 January 2024	31 July 2026	36	24	5	7	60	22	+38	66.67	
Career Total				36	24	5	7	60	22	+38	66.67	

== Honours ==
=== Player ===
France U-17

- FIFA U-17 World Cup: 2001

Ivory Coast

- Africa Cup of Nations runner-up: 2006

=== Manager ===
Ivory Coast

- Africa Cup of Nations: 2023

Individual

- AFCON Best Coach: 2023
- CAF Coach of the Year: 2024
