= Alassane Ouattara Stadium =

Stadium in Ivory Coast

- Olympic Stadium of Ebimpé
- CAF
- Interactive map of Alassane Ouattara Stadium
- Full name: Alassane Ouattara Olympic Stadium of Ebimpé
- Former names: Stade National de la Côte d'Ivoire (2020–2023)
- Location: Ebimpé, Abidjan, Ivory Coast
- Coordinates: 5°28′49″N 4°4′29″W
- Owner: Government of Ivory Coast
- Capacity: 60,012
- Surface: GrassMaster
- Field size: 115 yd × 74 yd (105 m × 68 m)

Construction
- Groundbreaking: 22 December 2016; 9 years ago
- Built: 2017–2020
- Opened: 3 October 2020; 6 years ago
- Cost: XOF 143 billion ($257 million)
- Architect: Beijing Institute Architectural Design
- Project manager: Bureau National des Etudes et du Développement
- Main contractor: Beijing Construction Engineering Group

Tenant
- Ivory Coast national football team (2020–present)

Alassane Ouattara Stadium, commonly known as the Olympic Stadium of Ebimpé and formerly as the National Stadium of the Ivory Coast, is a multi-purpose stadium in Ebimpé and Anyama, in northern Abidjan. It opened in 2020. The stadium hosts major football matches including home matches of the Ivory Coast national football team. Alassane Ouattara Stadium is owned by the Government of Ivory Coast. With 60,000 seats, it is the largest stadium in Ivory Coast and one of the most modern stadiums in Africa.

Designed by the Beijing Institute Architectural Design, the new national stadium of Ivory Coast was strategically situated away from Abidjan, positioned between the communes of Ebimpé and Anyama. In a direct distance, it stands approximately 20 km north of central Abidjan. The decision to relocate the country's sporting hub beyond the city limits was a deliberate one. Ultimately, it is envisioned to be an integral part of a sprawling 287-hectare sports city, set to become one of the largest sports and leisure districts in Africa to host multiple sports like football, rugby and athletics. As for the stadium itself, the initial construction phase covered only its immediate surroundings, encompassing four plazas and providing 1,400 parking spaces. The stadium is situated on a rectangular plot spanning 20 hectares. Due to variations in land elevation, the project necessitated extensive excavation, involving the removal of approximately 500,000 tons of soil. This early stage presented considerable challenges, exacerbated by heavy rainfall that led to instances of mud flooding.

The stadium was primarily designed and its construction was initiated with the intention of hosting the 2021 Africa Cup of Nations, under the leadership of Prime Minister Daniel Kablan Duncan, but On 30 November 2018, CAF stripped Cameroon of hosting the 2019 Africa Cup of Nations because of delays in the construction of stadiums and other necessary infrastructure; it was relocated to Egypt. Then-CAF President Ahmad Ahmad said that Cameroon had agreed to host the 2021 tournament instead. Consequently, Ivory Coast, the original hosts of 2021, hosted the 2023 Africa Cup of Nations. On 30 January 2019, the CAF President confirmed the timetable shift, after a meeting with Ivory Coast President, Alassane Ouattara, in Abidjan, Ivory Coast. The 2023 Africa Cup of Nations is the first major competition hosted in the country since the 1984 edition.

== History ==
=== Construction ===
The ground was broken for the stadium on 22 December 2016 by Prime Minister Daniel Kablan Duncan, with the presence of a China embassy representative. In keeping with the common practice in Chinese–African partnerships in stadium diplomacy, most of the work on the stadium was carried out by Chinese companies, with an array of Chinese brands involved in the project. The design documentation for the stadium was prepared by the Beijing Institute of Architectural Design (BIAD), while the construction itself was executed by the Beijing Construction Engineering Group. From the early stages of conceptual design, the stadium earned its nickname, the "Arc de Triomphe." This moniker was bestowed due to the presence of 96 columns encircling the entire structure, creating a dynamic arcade adorned with stained glass in the national colors. These columns serve both as a striking façade and as support for the roof. At its peak, the stadium reaches a height of 51.4 meters, with approximate dimensions of 290 meters in length and 270 meters in width.The stadium boasts an impressive blueprint covering over 61,250 square meters and offers five floors of facilities, particularly concentrated within the main stand. The seating bowl is divided into three tiers, each providing 24 rows, 13 rows, and up to 28 rows from bottom to top, respectively. Only the third tier is not a continuous ring, featuring openings in all corners. Despite the auditorium being topped by 32 spacious roof girders, the roof fully covers only the third tier and part of the second tier.

Official construction activities commenced on December 22, 2016, with an initial delivery deadline set for October 2019, totaling 34 months for completion. At its peak, the construction site saw around 1,500 individuals working, with approximately 400 of them being Chinese personnel. However, the project experienced significant delays, leading to the stadium's completion only in late spring of 2020. Several factors contributed to the delay, including adverse weather conditions, a considerable number of malaria cases among the Chinese workforce, and the impact of the COVID-19 pandemic late in the project timeline. Consequently, the opening date was postponed to October 2020. Due to the international collaboration involved in the stadium's construction, the Ivorian government was responsible for covering only a portion of the project's cost, with the remaining funds provided by China. The reported total cost of the stadium was XOF 143 billion (approximately $257 million at the time of opening), with China contributing 63 billion.With a seating capacity of just over 60,000, the stadium is nearly twice the size of Ivory Coast's previous national stadium, Felix Houphouet Boigny Stadium. Following its inauguration, it became one of the largest stadiums in West Africa. In November 2019, the stadium was near its completion. It was expected to be delivered to the government of Ivory Coast in February 2020. However, there was a delay due to the weather and health issues, including the COVID-19 pandemic.

=== Inauguration ===
Stadium at night

The stadium was inaugurated on 3 October 2020 and was named after President Alassane Ouattara. Many officials and the Chinese ambassador in Ivory Coast were also present at a party in the stadium which contained a show of dance and music. A friendly match was also played after the show between the two most popular clubs in Ivory Coast and Africa, ASEC Mimosas and Africa Sports d'Abidjan. ASEC Mimosas won the match 2–0.

== 2023 Africa Cup of Nations ==
The stadium was one of the venues for the 2023 Africa Cup of Nations.

The following matches were played at the stadium:

| Date | Time (GMT) | Team #1 | Result | Team #2 | Round | Spectators |
|---|---|---|---|---|---|---|
| 13 January 2024 | 20:00 | Ivory Coast | 2–0 | Guinea-Bissau | Group A | 36,858 |
| 14 January 2024 | 14:00 | Nigeria | 1–1 | Equatorial Guinea | Group A | 8,500 |
| 18 January 2024 | 14:00 | Equatorial Guinea | 4–2 | Guinea-Bissau | Group A | 13,888 |
| 18 January 2024 | 17:00 | Ivory Coast | 0–1 | Nigeria | Group A | 49,517 |
| 22 January 2024 | 17:00 | Equatorial Guinea | 4–0 | Ivory Coast | Group A | 42,550 |
| 22 January 2024 | 20:00 | Mozambique | 2–2 | Ghana | Group B | 6,000 |
| 28 January 2024 | 17:00 | Equatorial Guinea | 0–1 | Guinea | Round of 16 | 36,340 |
| 2 February 2024 | 20:00 | DR Congo | 3–1 | Guinea | Quarter-finals | 33,278 |
| 7 February 2024 | 20:00 | Ivory Coast | 1–0 | DR Congo | Semi-finals | 51,020 |
| 11 February 2024 | 20:00 | Nigeria | 1–2 | Ivory Coast | Final | 57,094 |

== See also ==
- List of football stadiums in Ivory Coast
- List of African stadiums by capacity
- List of association football stadiums by capacity
- Lists of stadiums

| Preceded by Paul Biya Stadium; Yaoundé | Africa Cup of Nations; Final venue 2023 | Succeeded by Prince Moulay Abdellah Stadium; Rabat |
