= José Peseiro =

Portuguese football manager (born 1960)

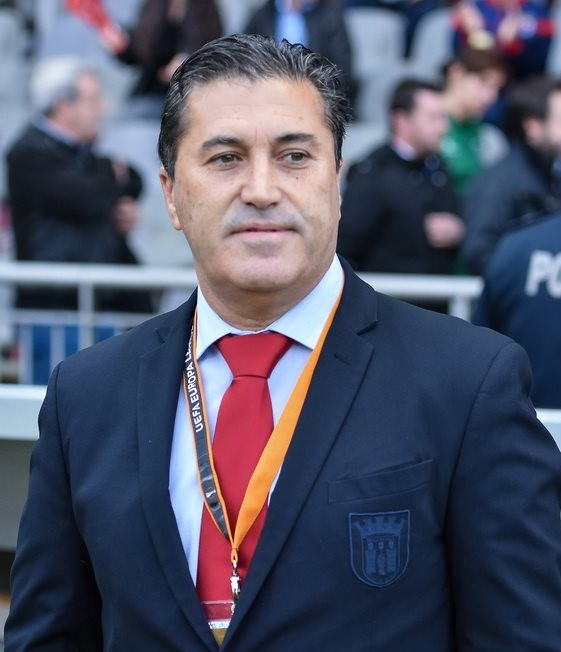
- Peseiro as manager of Braga in 2016

Personal information
- Full name: José Vítor dos Santos Peseiro
- Date of birth: 4 April 1960 (age 66)
- Place of birth: Coruche, Portugal
- Position: Forward

Team information
- Current team: Al-Ula (manager)

Youth career
- 1977–1979: Coruchense

Senior career*
Years	Team	Apps	(Gls)
1979–1980	Cartaxo		
1980–1982	Coruchense		
1982–1983	Oriental		
1983–1984	Amora	6	(0)
1984–1987	Oriental	51	(3)
1987–1988	Samora Correia	33	(7)
1988–1989	Torreense	5	(1)
1989–1991	União Santarém		
1991–1992	Alcanenense		
1992–1994	União Santarém		

Managerial career
- 1992–1994: União Santarém
- 1994–1996: União Montemor
- 1996–1999: Oriental
- 1999–2003: Nacional
- 2003–2004: Real Madrid (assistant)
- 2004–2005: Sporting CP
- 2006–2007: Al Hilal
- 2007–2008: Panathinaikos
- 2008: Rapid București
- 2008–2009: Rapid București
- 2009–2011: Saudi Arabia
- 2012–2013: Braga
- 2013–2015: Al Wahda
- 2015–2016: Al Ahly
- 2016: Porto
- 2016: Braga
- 2017: Sharjah
- 2018: Vitória Guimarães
- 2018: Sporting CP
- 2020–2021: Venezuela
- 2022–2024: Nigeria
- 2025: Zamalek
- 2026–: Al-Ula
Medal record
Men's football
Representing Nigeria (as manager)
Africa Cup of Nations
Runner-up	2023 Ivory Coast
- * Club domestic league appearances and goals

José Vítor dos Santos Peseiro MON (born 4 April 1960) is a Portuguese football manager and former player who played as a forward. He is the head coach of Saudi First Division League club Al-Ula.

After an unassuming career as a player, he went on to coach several clubs in his country, including Sporting CP – which he took to the 2005 UEFA Cup final– and Porto. He also worked extensively in Arab nations, being in charge of the Saudi Arabia national team. He also finished second at the 2023 Africa Cup of Nations with Nigeria.

== Playing career ==
Born in Coruche, Santarém District, Peseiro never played in higher than the Segunda Liga as a professional, starting out at Sport Lisboa e Cartaxo in 1979. In that competition, he represented Amora, Oriental, Samora Correia and Torreense for a total of five seasons.

34-year-old Peseiro retired at the end of the 1993–94 season in the fourth division, with local club União de Santarém.

== Coaching career ==
=== Beginnings ===
Peseiro spent his first eight years as a manager in the third and fourth tiers of Portuguese football, starting out as a player-coach at his last team. In summer 1999, he was appointed at Nacional, which he helped get promoted to the Primeira Liga in just three seasons. In 2002–03, he led the team to a final eleventh position.

In 2003–04, Peseiro assisted Carlos Queiroz at Real Madrid. At the end of the campaign, after the team lost a considerable advantage on the table to be finally surpassed by Valencia, Barcelona and Deportivo de La Coruña, the pair was sacked, and the latter returned to his assistant position in Manchester United.

=== Sporting CP ===
Peseiro signed with Sporting CP for 2004–05. After collecting three losses and two draws in his first nine games in charge, the side eventually finished in third place with 61 points, four behind champions Benfica; additionally, he coached the team to a runner-up run in the UEFA Cup after disposing of the likes of Feyenoord, Middlesbrough and Newcastle United. The final was played at the Estádio José Alvalade, and after a 1–0 lead at half-time the hosts eventually succumbed to CSKA Moscow 3–1.

At the start of the 2005–06 season, the Lions were ousted from the UEFA Champions League by Udinese, and after being relegated to the UEFA Cup they were immediately knocked out by Halmstad 4–4 on aggregate after a 2–3 home loss. On 16 October 2005, following a 0–1 home defeat to Académica de Coimbra that saw Sporting sink to the seventh position, he resigned.

=== Eastern Europe ===
In the 2007 off-season, Peseiro was named manager of Panathinaikos. After failing to win the Super League Greece and also losing 4–0 to neighbouring Olympiacos in the domestic cup, he was forced to step down.

In June 2008, Peseiro signed a three-year contract with Romanian club Rapid București. On 2 October, after being eliminated from the UEFA Cup by VfL Wolfsburg, he was sacked only to be reinstated a few days later; he eventually resigned on 12 January 2009, after failing to agree on a new deal.

=== Saudi Arabia ===
Peseiro succeeded Nasser Al-Johar at the helm of the Saudi Arabia national team in 2009, during the 2010 FIFA World Cup qualifying campaign. His debut took place on 28 March, and it ended with a 2–1 away win over Iran which was the former's first ever victory in that country and the latter's first loss in nearly 40 home games; eventually, the nation failed to reach the finals in South Africa after losing to Bahrain on the away goals rule, and on 10 January 2011 he was relieved of his duties following a 2–1 defeat against Syria in the 2011 AFC Asian Cup opener.

=== Braga ===
On 3 June 2012, Peseiro was appointed at Braga. His first major signing was Portuguese international Rúben Micael, and he qualified the club for the group stage of the Champions League for the second time in its history, after disposing of Udinese on penalties.

At the end of the campaign, in spite of winning the Taça da Liga and ranking fourth in the league, Braga and Peseiro reached an agreement to terminate the manager's contract.

=== Al-Wahda and Al-Ahly ===
From 11 November 2013 to 11 January 2015, Peseiro worked with Al Wahda in the UAE Pro League. On 9 October of the latter year, Al Ahly announced his signing; upon hearing the news, fans of the latter protested against the decision based on his weak résumé.

=== Return to Portugal ===
On 18 January 2016, after cutting ties with the Egyptian side, Peseiro replaced Julen Lopetegui at Porto. Even though the third position they occupied at the time of the Spaniard's dismissal was still secured, he collected more losses than his predecessor, and also lost the final of the Taça de Portugal to his former team Braga, on penalties.

On 6 June 2016, Peseiro signed a two-year deal with Braga. On 14 December, following consecutive home defeats that resulted in elimination from the Europa League and the Portuguese Cup, respectively at the hands of Shakhtar Donetsk (4–2) and Covilhã (2–1), he was fired.

Peseiro returned to the UAE in January 2017 with Sharjah, and was sacked nine months later after a poor start to the new season. The following February, he went home to sign a contract at Vitória de Guimarães until June 2019, which he rescinded by mutual agreement a year early.

In July 2018, Peseiro returned to Sporting after 13 years away, assuming the reins at a club that had lost several key players following fan violence, and whose previous manager Siniša Mihajlović lasted just nine days in the job. On 1 November, following poor overall performances and a 1–2 home loss against Estoril in the group stage of the Taça da Liga, he was relieved of his duties.

=== Venezuela ===
Peseiro returned to national team duties on 4 February 2020, being appointed by Venezuela after the resignation of Rafael Dudamel. He made his debut on 9 October in a 3–0 loss away to Colombia in 2022 FIFA World Cup qualification; the opponents were led by compatriot Carlos Queiroz.

At the 2021 Copa América in Brazil, Venezuela was eliminated from the group stage with two draws and two defeats; Peseiro was praised by pundit Tim Vickery for achieving those results, despite a spate of COVID-19 infections and virus-related travel restrictions that kept key forward Salomón Rondón in China. He resigned in August, having not been paid for over a year amidst the South American country's economic crisis.

=== Nigeria ===
On 29 December 2021, Peseiro reached a verbal agreement with the Nigeria Football Federation to replace Gernot Rohr at the helm of the national team. He was supposed to travel to the 2021 Africa Cup of Nations in Cameroon, but strictly as an "observer" while interim manager Augustine Eguavoen led the side to the last 16; the deal eventually fell through, as Eguavoen was retained at the end of the tournament.

On 15 May 2022, Peseiro was finally appointed as the new head coach. He finished runner-up in the 2023 Africa Cup of Nations, losing 2–1 to hosts Ivory Coast; subsequently, he was awarded the Order of the Niger by president Bola Tinubu.

Peseiro left his position on 1 March 2024.

=== Zamalek ===
Peseiro returned to both club duties and the Egyptian Premier League on 14 February 2025, signing a one-and-a-half-year contract at Zamalek. In his first three matches in charge, he managed three 1–1 draws. He was dismissed on 7 May, with the team third in the league and in the final of the Egypt Cup.

=== Return to Saudi Arabia ===
On 3 January 2026, Peseiro was appointed manager of Saudi First Division League's Al-Ula, on a deal until June 2027.

== Managerial statistics ==
As of match played 3 September 2026

Managerial record by team and tenure
Team	Nat	From	To	Record								Ref.
Team	Nat	From	To	G	W	D	L	GF	GA	GD	Win %	Ref.
Oriental	(Portugal)	29 October 1996	2 June 1999	103	51	26	26	136	103	+33	49.51	
Nacional	(Portugal)	2 June 1999	25 June 2003	148	68	40	40	234	182	+52	45.95	
Sporting CP	(Portugal)	3 June 2004	18 October 2005	63	34	10	19	118	74	+44	53.97	
Al Hilal	(Saudi Arabia)	4 June 2006	10 January 2007	14	10	2	2	22	10	+12	71.43	
Panathinaikos	(Greece)	5 June 2007	15 May 2008	46	30	10	6	74	32	+42	65.22	
Rapid București	(Romania)	3 June 2008	2 October 2008	11	4	2	5	12	11	+1	36.36	
Rapid București	(Romania)	9 October 2008	12 January 2009	9	6	3	0	17	8	+9	66.67	
Saudi Arabia	(Saudi Arabia)	18 February 2009	10 January 2011	31	12	12	7	35	22	+13	38.71	
Braga	(Portugal)	3 June 2012	29 May 2013	47	23	8	16	84	64	+20	48.94	
Al Wahda	(United Arab Emirates)	11 November 2013	11 January 2015	43	20	13	10	77	61	+16	46.51	
Al Ahly	(Egypt)	9 October 2015	18 January 2016	12	8	2	2	22	10	+12	66.67	
Porto	(Portugal)	21 January 2016	30 May 2016	22	13	1	8	38	26	+12	59.09	
Braga	(Portugal)	6 June 2016	15 December 2016	23	11	5	7	39	30	+9	47.83	
Sharjah	(United Arab Emirates)	1 January 2017	16 October 2017	21	3	8	10	24	36	−12	14.29	
Vitória Guimarães	(Portugal)	28 February 2018	16 May 2018	10	4	2	4	13	10	+3	40.00	
Sporting CP	(Portugal)	1 July 2018	1 November 2018	14	9	1	4	24	14	+10	64.29	
Venezuela	(Venezuela)	4 February 2020	20 August 2021	10	1	3	6	5	15	−10	10.00	
Nigeria	(Nigeria)	15 May 2022	1 March 2024	22	10	5	7	39	25	+14	45.45	
Zamalek	(Egypt)	14 February 2025	7 May 2025	18	8	8	2	25	13	+12	44.44	
Al-Ula	(Saudi Arabia)	6 January 2026	present	26	20	2	4	57	21	+36	76.92	
Total				695	345	163	187	1,094	770	+324	49.64	—

== Honours ==
Nacional

- Segunda Divisão: 1999–00
- AF Madeira Cup: 2001–02

Sporting CP

- UEFA Cup runner-up: 2004–05

Braga

- Taça da Liga: 2012–13

Al Ahly

- Egyptian Premier League: 2015–16

Porto

- Taça de Portugal runner-up: 2015–16

Nigeria

- Africa Cup of Nations runner-up: 2023

Orders

- Member of the Order of the Niger
