= Stanley Nwabali =

Nigerian footballer (born 1996)

Personal information
- Full name: Stanley Bobo Nwabali
- Date of birth: 10 June 1996 (age 30)
- Place of birth: Port Harcourt, Nigeria
- Height: 1.96 m (6 ft 5 in)
- Position: Goalkeeper

Team information
- Current team: Chippa United
- Number: 23

Youth career
- Sharks

Senior career*
Years	Team	Apps	(Gls)
2018–2019	Go Round	17	(0)
2019–2020	Wikki Tourists	18	(0)
2020–2021	Enyimba	12	(0)
2021–2022	Lobi Stars	28	(0)
2022	Katsina United	12	(0)
2022–2026	Chippa United	66	(0)
2026-	Chippa United	9	(0)

International career^{‡}
2021–	Nigeria	38	(0)
Medal record
Men's football
Representing Nigeria
Africa Cup of Nations
Runner-up	2023 Ivory Coast
Third place	2025 Morocco
- * Club domestic league appearances and goals as of 14 November 2026 ‡ National team caps and goals as of 17 November 2026

Stanley Bobo Nwabali MON (born 10 June 1996) is a Nigerian professional footballer who played as a goalkeeper for the Nigeria national team.

== Personal life ==
Nwabali was born in Port Harcourt, River State, Nigeria on 10 June 1996 into a Christian family. He considers German goalkeeper Manuel Neuer as his role model. His last name Nwabali, means “Child of the Night” in the igbo language.

== Club career ==
In 2018, Nwabali joined Go Round, a Nigerian club based in Omoku, before later securing a move to Enyimba in 2020, followed by joining Lobi Stars, Katsina United and Chippa United, a South African club in 2022.

== International career ==
Nwabali earned his first cap for the Nigerian national team in 2021, in an international friendly match against Mexico in Los Angeles, United States.

In December 2023, he was called up for the 2023 Africa Cup of Nations (AFCON) in Ivory Coast. He was named Man of the Match in the semi-final encounter against South Africa, as he saved two penalties in a 4–2 victory during the pently shootouts following a 1–1 draw, which qualified his country for the final.

On 11 December 2025, Stanley Nwabali was included in the Nigerian team for the 2025 Africa Cup of Nations taking place in Morocco, earning a bronze medal

== Player profile ==
=== Style of play ===
Nwabali is known for his shot‑stopping ability, command of the penalty area, and composure under pressure. He combines strong physical presence (1.96 m in height) with agility and has been praised for his defensive leadership at both club and international levels.

== Career statistics ==
=== International ===
As of match played 17 November 2026

Appearances and goals by national team and year
National team	Year	Apps	Goals
Nigeria	2021	1	0
Nigeria	2024	16	0
Nigeria	2025	13	0
Nigeria	2026	8	0
Total		38	0

== Honours ==
Nigeria

- Africa Cup of Nations runner-up: 2023; third place: 2025

National honours

- Member of the Order of the Niger
- Morocco
- Africa Cup of Nations third position:2025
