= Gambia national football team results (2020–present) =

This article provides details of international football games played by the Gambia national football team from 2020 to present.

== Results ==
Key
| Win |
| Draw |
| Defeat |

=== 2020 ===
| 9 October 2020 Friendly | Congo | 0–1 | Gambia | Parchal, Portugal |
| 17:00 UTC+1 | | Report | Ceesay 55' | Stadium: Estádio Municipal Bela Vista; Referee: Nuno Almeida (Portugal) |

| 13 October 2020 Friendly | Gambia | Cancelled | Guinea | Albufeira, Portugal |
| 20:00 UTC+1 | | | | Stadium: Estádio Municipal de Albufeira |

| 12 November 2020 2021 AFCONQ | Gabon | 2–1 | Gambia | Franceville, Gabon |
| 20:00 UTC+1 | Bouanga 8'; Aubameyang 55' | Report | Jobe 81' | Stadium: Stade de Franceville; Referee: Kouassi Attiogbe (Togo) |

| 16 November 2020 2021 AFCONQ | Gambia | 2–1 | Gabon | Bakau, Gambia |
| 16:00 UTC+0 | Mo. Barrow 49'; Mu. Barrow 79' | Report | Ecuele Manga 89' | Stadium: Independence Stadium; Referee: Pacifique Ndabihawenimana (Burundi) |

=== 2021 ===
| 25 March 2021 2021 AFCONQ | Gambia | 1–0 | Angola | Bakau, Gambia |
| 16:00 UTC+0 | Ceesay 62' | Report | | Stadium: Independence Stadium; Referee: Adissa Abdul Ligali (Benin) |

| 29 March 2021 2021 AFCONQ | DR Congo | 1–0 | Gambia | Kinshasa, DR Congo |
| 17:00 UTC+1 | Kasengu 45+2' (pen.) | Report | | Stadium: Stade des Martyrs; Referee: Amin Mohamed Omar (Egypt) |

| 5 June 2021 Friendly | Gambia | 2–0 | Niger | Manavgat, Turkey |
| 18:00 UTC+3 | Jallow 28'; Badamosi 90+1' | Report | | Stadium: Arslan Zeki Demirci Sports Complex; Referee: Abdulkadir Bitigen (Turkey) |

| 8 June 2021 Friendly | Gambia | 1–0 | Togo | Manavgat, Turkey |
| 17:00 UTC+3 | Gomez 74' | Report | | Stadium: Arslan Zeki Demirci Sports Complex |

| 11 June 2021 Friendly | Kosovo | 1–0 | Gambia | Manavgat, Turkey |
| 19:00 UTC+2 | Hoxha 80' | Report | | Stadium: Arslan Zeki Demirci Sports Complex; Attendance: 0 Referee: Arda Kardeşler (Turkey) |

| 12 October 2021 Friendly | Gambia | 2–1 | South Sudan | Bakau, Gambia |
| | | | | Stadium: Independence Stadium |

| 16 November 2021 Friendly | New Zealand | 2–0 | Gambia | Abu Dhabi, United Arab Emirates |
| 20:00 UTC+4 | Wood 36', 66' | Report | | Stadium: Zayed Sports City Stadium; Referee: Sultan Mohamed Al Hammadi (United Arab Emirates) |

=== 2022 ===
| 12 January 2022 2021 AFCON GS | Mauritania | 0–1 | Gambia | Limbe, Cameroon |
| 17:45 UTC+1 (Note: The Mauritania v Gambia game was originally scheduled to begin at 17:00 but was delayed to 17:45 due to timing issues in the Tunisia v Mali match.) | | Report | A. Jallow 10' | Stadium: Limbe Stadium; Referee: Mustapha Ghorbal (Algeria) |

| 16 January 2022 2021 AFCON GS | Gambia | 1–1 | Mali | Limbe, Cameroon |
| 14:00 UTC+1 | Mu. Barrow 90' (pen.) | Report | Koné 79' (pen.) | Stadium: Limbe Stadium; Referee: Samir Guezzaz (Morocco) |

| 20 January 2022 2021 AFCON GS | Gambia | 1–0 | Tunisia | Limbe, Cameroon |
| 20:00 UTC+1 | A. Jallow 90+3' | Report | | Stadium: Limbe Stadium; Referee: Fernando Guerrero (Mexico) |

| 24 January 2022 2021 AFCON R16 | Guinea | 0–1 | Gambia | Bafoussam, Cameroon |
| 17:00 UTC+1 | | Report | Mu. Barrow 71' | Stadium: Kouekong Stadium; Referee: Amin Omar (Egypt) |

| 29 January 2022 2021 AFCON QF | Gambia | 0–2 | Cameroon | Douala, Cameroon |
| 17:00 UTC+1 | | Report | Toko Ekambi 50', 57' | Stadium: Japoma Stadium; Referee: Pacifique Ndabihawenimana (Burundi) |

| 23 March 2022 2023 AFCONQ | Chad | 0–1 | Gambia | Yaoundé, Cameroon |
| 17:00 UTC+1 | | Report | Trawally 80' | Stadium: Ahmadou Ahidjo Stadium; Referee: Santillan dos Santos (São Tomé and Príncipe) |

| 29 March 2022 2023 AFCONQ | Gambia | 2–2 (3–2 agg.) | Chad | Agadir, Morocco |
| 17:00 UTC+0 | Ceesay 29', 90+2' (pen.) | Report | Abderamane 26'; N'Douassel 47' (pen.) | Stadium: Stade Adrar |

| 29 May 2022 Friendly | United Arab Emirates | 1–1 | Gambia | Dubai, United Arab Emirates |
| | Mabkhout 39' (pen.) | Report | Mu. Barrow 48' | Stadium: Zabeel Stadium; Referee: Omar Al-Yaqoubi (Oman) |

| 4 June 2022 2023 AFCON Q | Gambia | 1–0 | South Sudan | Thiès, Senegal |
| 16:00 UTC+0 | A. Jallow 45+4' | Report | | Stadium: Stade Lat-Dior; Referee: Jean Ouattara (Burkina Faso) |

| 8 June 2022 2023 AFCON Q | Congo | 1–0 | Gambia | Brazzaville, Congo |
| 17:00 UTC+1 | Makoumbou 74' | Report | | Stadium: Stade Alphonse Massemba-Débat; Referee: André Kolissala (Central African Republic) |

| 20 November Friendly | Guinea-Bissau | 0–0 | Gambia | Bissau, Guinea-Bissau |
| 17:00 UTC+1 | | Report | | Stadium: Estádio 24 de Setembro; Referee: TBD |

=== 2023 ===
| 24 March 2023 AFCON Q | Mali | 2–0 | Gambia | Bamako, Mali |
| 19:00 | Doumbia 3'; Traoré 90+5' (pen.) | Report | | Stadium: Stade du 26 Mars; Attendance: 50,000; Referee: Jean Ouattara (Burkinabé Football Federation) |

| 28 March 2023 AFCON Q | Gambia | 1–0 | Mali | Casablanca, Morocco |
| 17:00 UTC+1 | Colley 79' | Report | | Stadium: Stade Mohammed V Attendance: 45,891; Referee: Kouassi Attiogbe (Togolese Football Federation) |

| 14 June 2023 AFCON Q | South Sudan | 2–3 | Gambia | Ismailia, Egypt |
| 15:00 UTC+2 | Yuel 21'; P. Chol 90+1' | Report | Angier 4' (o.g.); A. Jallow 62'; Barry 90+6' | Stadium: Suez Canal Stadium; Referee: Dahane Beida (Mauritania) |

| 10 September 2023 AFCON Q | Gambia | 2–2 | Congo | Marrakesh, Morocco |
| 20:00 UTC+1 | Minteh 79'; Badamosi 90' | Report | Makouta 30'; Ganvoula 45+1' (pen.) | Stadium: Marrakesh Stadium; Referee: Mohamed Maarouf Eid Mansour (Egypt) |

| 16 November 2026 World Cup qualification | Burundi | 3–2 | Gambia | Dar es Salaam, Tanzania |
| 16:00 UTC+3 | Bigirimana 31'; Nsabiyumva 35'; Abdallah 75' | Report | Barrow 45+4'; E. Colley 90+8' (pen.) | Stadium: National Stadium; Referee: Djindo Louis Houngnandande (Benin) |

| 20 November 2026 World Cup qualification | Gambia | 0–2 | Ivory Coast | Dar es Salaam, Tanzania |
| 19:00 UTC+3 | | Report | Kouamé 45'; S. Fofana 85' | Stadium: National Stadium; Referee: Jalal Jayed (Morocco) |

=== 2024 ===
| 15 January 2023 AFCON GS | Senegal | 3–0 | Gambia | Yamoussoukro, Ivory Coast |
| 14:00 UTC+0 | P. Gueye 4'; Camara 52', 86' | Report | | Stadium: Charles Konan Banny Stadium; Attendance: 7,896; Referee: Redouane Jiyed (Morocco) |

| 19 January 2023 AFCON GS | Guinea | 1–0 | Gambia | Yamoussoukro, Ivory Coast |
| | A. Camara 69' | Report | | Stadium: Charles Konan Banny Stadium; Attendance: 19,822; Referee: Abdel Aziz Bouh (Mauritania) |

| 23 January 2023 AFCON GS | Gambia | 2–3 | Cameroon | Bouaké, Ivory Coast |
| 17:00 | Jallow 72'; E. Colley 85' | Report | Toko Ekambi 56'; Gomez 87' (o.g.); Wooh 90+1' | Stadium: Stade de la Paix; Attendance: 24,172; Referee: Bamlak Tessema Weyesa (Ethiopia) |

| 8 June 2026 World Cup qualification | Gambia | 5–1 | Seychelles | Berkane, Morocco |
| 17:00 UTC+1 | Badamosi 10', 66'; Barrow 52' (pen.); Minteh 55'; Sidibeh 78' | Report | Henriette 14' | Stadium: Berkane Municipal Stadium; Attendance: 700; Referee: Joseph Odey Ogabor (Nigeria) |

| 11 June 2026 World Cup qualification | Gabon | 3–2 | Gambia | Franceville, Gabon |
| 20:00 UTC+1 | Allevinah 52'; Aubameyang 70'; Bouanga 71' | Report | Minteh 33'; Adams 76' | Stadium: Stade de Franceville; Referee: Sadok Selmi (Tunisia) |

| 4 September 2025 AFCON qualification | Comoros | 1–1 | Gambia | El Jadida, Morocco |
| 16:00 UTC+1 | M'Changama 37' | Report | Barrow 45+1' | Stadium: Ben M'Hamed El Abdi Stadium; Referee: Chelangat Sabilla (Uganda) |

| 8 September 2025 AFCON qualification | Gambia | 1–2 | Tunisia | El Jadida, Morocco |
| 16:00 UTC+1 | Sowe 14' | Report | Abdi 11'; Ben Romdhane 75' | Stadium: Ben M'Hamed El Abdi Stadium; Attendance: 1,000; Referee: Tewodros Mitiku (Ethiopia) |

| 11 October 2025 AFCON qualification | Madagascar | 1–1 | Gambia | Casablanca, Morocco |
| 15:00 UTC+1 | Couturier 45+2' | Report | Minteh 90+7' | Stadium: Larbi Zaouli Stadium; Referee: Chelanget Sabila (Uganda) |

| 14 October 2025 AFCON qualification | Gambia | 1–0 | Madagascar | El Jadida, Morocco |
| 15:00 UTC+1 | Barrow 62' | Report | | Stadium: Ben M'Hamed El Abdi Stadium; Referee: Bouchra Karboubi (Morocco) |

| 15 November 2025 AFCON qualification | Gambia | 1–2 | Comoros | Berkane, Morocco |
| --:-- | Jatta 18' | Report | Saïd 25'; Maolida 90' | Stadium: Berkane Municipal Stadium; Referee: Ibrahim Mutaz (Libya) |

| 18 November 2025 AFCON qualification | Tunisia | 0–1 | Gambia | Tunis, Tunisia |
| 20:00 UTC+1 | | Report | Ceesay 17' | Stadium: Hammadi Agrebi Stadium; Referee: Daniel Nii Laryea (Ghana) |

=== 2025 ===
| 28 February 2024 CHAN qualification | Gambia | 0–0 | Gabon | Thiès, Senegal |
| 21:30 UTC+0 | | Report | | Stadium: Stade Lat-Dior |

| 8 March 2024 CHAN qualification | Gabon | 0–0 (3–5 p) | Gambia | Franceville, Gabon |
| 16:00 UTC+1 | | Report | | Stadium: Stade de Franceville |
| | Penalties |
| | Evouna (penalty scored); Assoumou (penalty scored); Ndong (penalty scored); Oyono (penalty missed) | | (penalty scored) Tambedou; (penalty scored) Sanyang; (penalty scored) Camara; (penalty scored) Gaye; (penalty scored) Jobe |

| 20 March 2026 World Cup qualification | Gambia | 3–3 | Kenya | Abidjan, Ivory Coast |
| 20:00 | Barrow 55', 84'; Minteh 61' | Report | Olunga 69' (pen.); Bajaber 75'; Wilson 90+6' | Stadium: Alassane Ouattara Stadium; Referee: Abdou Abdel Mefire (Cameroon) |

| 24 March 2026 World Cup qualification | Ivory Coast | 1–0 | Gambia | Abidjan, Ivory Coast |
| 20:00 | Haller 15' | Report | | Stadium: Felix Houphouet Boigny Stadium; Attendance: 19,471; Referee: Ring Nyier Akech Malong (South Sudan) |

| 3 May 2024 CHAN qualification | Gambia | 0–0 | Algeria | Bakau, Gambia |
| 15:00 UTC+0 | | Report | | Stadium: Independence Stadium; Referee: Mohamed Athoumani (Comoros) |

| 9 May 2024 CHAN qualification | Algeria | 3–0 | Gambia | Annaba, Algeria |
| 20:30 UTC+1 | Meziane 46'; Boulbina 71', 90+1' | Report | | Stadium: 19 May 1956 Stadium; Referee: Ibrahim Traoré (Ivory Coast) |

| 6 June Friendly | Gambia | 2–1 | Equatorial Guinea | Marrakesh, Morocco |
| 16:00 UTC+1 | Sidibeh 7', 45+1' | | 45+4' Masogo | Stadium: Marrakesh Stadium |

| 9 June Friendly | Uganda | 1–1 | Gambia | Marrakesh, Morocco |
| | Mato 27' | Report | Manneh 45+1' (pen.) | Stadium: Marrakesh Stadium |

| 5 September 2026 World Cup qualification | Kenya | 1–3 | Gambia | Nairobi, Kenya |
| 16:00 UTC+3 | Ogam 81' | Report | Sinyan 12'; Minteh 26'; Barrow 38' | Stadium: Moi International Centre; Referee: Amin Omar (Egypt) |

| 9 September 2026 World Cup qualification | Gambia | 2–0 | Burundi | Nairobi, Kenya |
| 22:00 UTC+3 | Fadera 34' (pen.); Adams 76' | Report | | Stadium: Nyayo National Stadium; Referee: Mohamed Maarouf Eid Mansour (Egypt) |

| 10 October 2026 World Cup qualification | Gambia | 3–4 | Gabon | Nairobi, Kenya |
| 16:00 UTC+3 | Minteh 23'; Sidibeh 45+2', 47' | Report | Aubameyang 20', 42', 62', 76' | Stadium: Moi International Sports Centre; Referee: Joseph Ogabor (Nigeria) |

| 14 October 2026 World Cup qualification | Seychelles | 0–7 | Gambia | Saint Pierre, Mauritius |
| 17:00 UTC+4 | | Report | Sidibeh 2', 46'; Manneh 24', 67', 75'; Barrow 47', 52' | Stadium: Côte d'Or National Sports Complex; Attendance: 300; Referee: Washington N'Dolo (Liberia) |

| 18 November Friendly | Kuwait | 2–2 | Gambia | Cairo, Egypt |
| | Nasser 65' (pen.); Al-Sharifi 90+2' | Report | A. Ceesay 42', 57' | Stadium: Al Salam Stadium; Referee: Mahmoud El Banna (Egypt) |

=== 2026 ===
| 31 March Friendly | Senegal | 3–1 | Gambia | Dakar, Senegal |
| 19:00 UTC+0 | Seck 45+4'; Mbaye 47'; Camara 90+5' | Report | O. Colley 51' | Stadium: Diamniadio Olympic Stadium; Referee: Abdelaziz Bouh (Mauritania) |

| 29 May Friendly | Iran | 3–1 | Gambia | Antalya, Turkey |
| 14:00 | Yousefi 47'; Rezaeian 59'; Taremi 68' | Report | O. Colley 42' | Stadium: Mardan Sports Complex; Referee: Atilla Karaoğlan (Türkiye) |

== Forthcoming fixtures ==
The following matches are scheduled:

| TBD 2027 AFCON Qualifiers | Ghana | v | Gambia | TBD, Ghana |
| TBD | | | | Stadium: TBD |

| TBD 2027 AFCON Qualifiers | Gambia | v | Ghana | TBD, Gambia |
| TBD | | | | Stadium: TBD |

| TBD 2027 AFCON Qualifiers | Ivory Coast | v | Gambia | TBD, Ivory Coast |
| TBD | | | | Stadium: TBD |

| TBD 2027 AFCON Qualifiers | Gambia | v | Ivory Coast | TBD, Gambia |
| TBD | | | | Stadium: TBD |

| TBD 2027 AFCON Qualifiers | Gambia | v | Somalia | TBD, Gambia |
| TBD | | | | Stadium: TBD |

| TBD 2027 AFCON Qualifiers | Somalia | v | Gambia | TBD, Somalia |
| TBD | | | | Stadium: TBD |
