= Gambia at the Africa Cup of Nations =

Gambia participating at football tournament

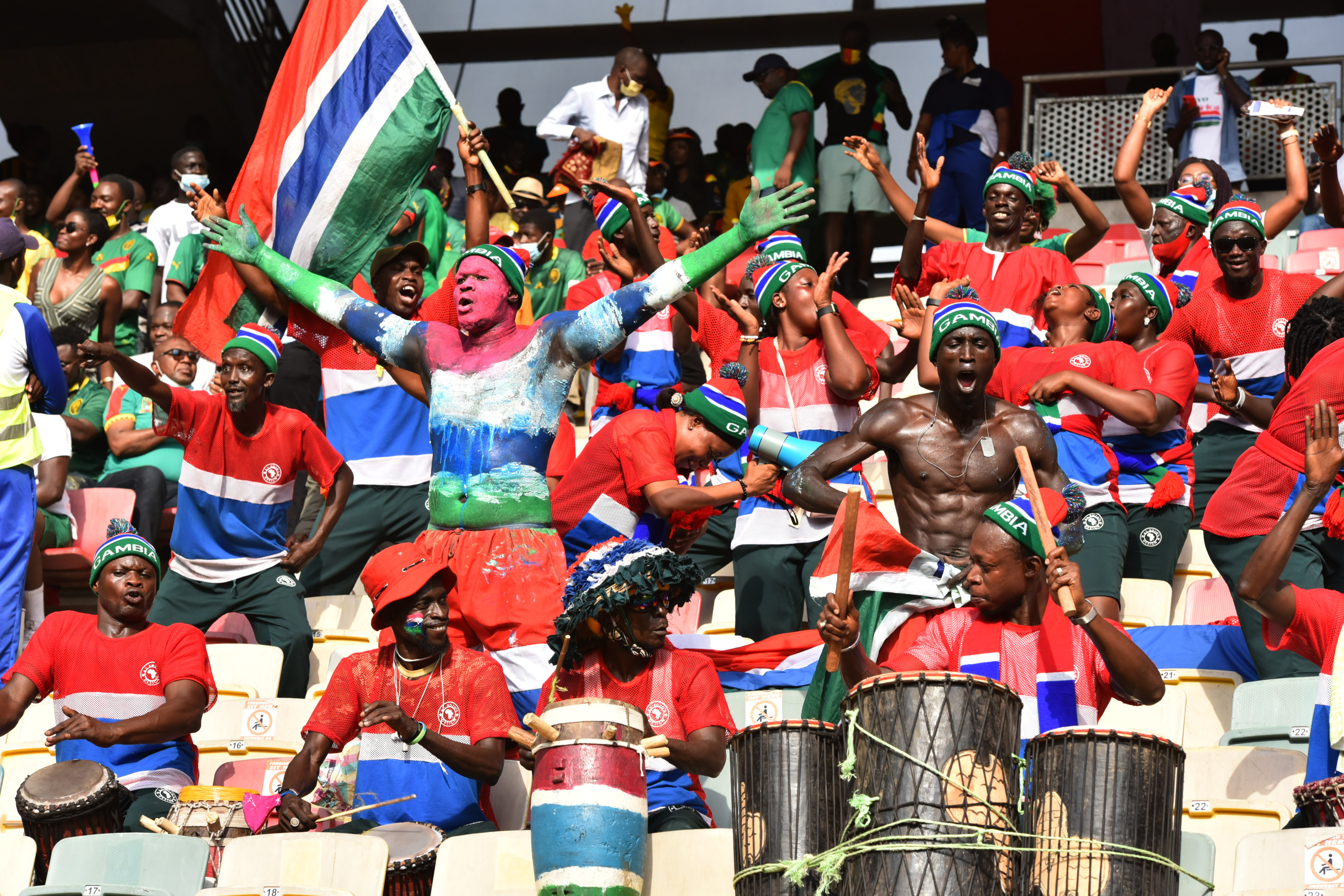
Gambian fans at Japoma Stadium in Douala at the 2021 Africa Cup of Nations.

Gambia have participated in the Africa Cup of Nations twice. The first time was in the 2021 edition in Cameroon where the team reached the quarter-finals. They debuted with a 1–0 win over Mauritania followed by a 1–1 draw to Mali. Gambia qualified for the round of 16 with a game to spare and on 20 January 2022 defeated Tunisia 1–0 in their final group match. They finished with the same points as Mali, which, however, won the group due to a better overall goal difference. Gambia continued to impress in the round of 16, defeating Guinea 1–0 to advance to the quarter-finals of the tournament. After a goalless first half, Gambia lost 2–0 to host Cameroon in the quarter-final in Douala.

The team reached the next edition for the second time, which was played in Ivory Coast, where he was eliminated from the group stage.

== Overall record ==
Africa Cup of Nations record
Year	Round	Position	Pld	W	D*	L	GF	GA
(Sudan) 1957 to (Ghana) 1963	Part of United Kingdom							
(Tunisia) 1965	Not affiliated to CAF							
(Ethiopia) 1968 to (Egypt) 1974	Did not enter							
(Ethiopia) 1976	Did not qualify							
(Ghana) 1978	Did not enter							
(Nigeria) 1980 to (Morocco) 1988	Did not qualify							
(Algeria) 1990	Withdrew							
(Senegal) 1992	Did not qualify							
(Tunisia) 1994	Did not enter							
(South Africa) 1996	Withdrew during qualifying							
(Burkina Faso) 1998	Banned for withdrawing in 1996							
(Ghana) (Nigeria) 2000	Withdrew							
(Mali) 2002 to (South Africa) 2013	Did not qualify							
(Equatorial Guinea) 2015	Banned							
(Gabon) 2017	Did not qualify							
(Egypt) 2019	Did not qualify							
(Cameroon) 2021	Quarter-finals	6th	5	3	1	1	4	3
(Ivory Coast) 2023	Group stage	23rd	3	0	0	3	2	7
(Morocco) 2025	Did not qualify							
(Kenya) (Tanzania) (Uganda) 2027	To be determined							
2029	To be determined							
Total	Quarter-finals	2/35	8	3	1	4	6	10

== Tournaments ==
=== 2021 Africa Cup of Nations ===
==== Group stage ====
Pos	Team	Pld	W	D	L	GF	GA	GD	Pts	Qualification
1	Mali	3	2	1	0	4	1	+3	7	Advance to knockout stage
2	Gambia	3	2	1	0	3	1	+2	7	Advance to knockout stage
3	Tunisia	3	1	0	2	4	2	+2	3	Advance to knockout stage
4	Mauritania	3	0	0	3	0	7	−7	0	

Source: CAF
12 January 2022
17:45 (Note: The Mauritania v Gambia match was originally scheduled to kick-off at 17:00, but was delayed to 17:45 due to timing issues in the Tunisia v Mali match.)

Mauritania	0–1	Gambia
	Report	A. Jallow 10'

Limbe Stadium, Limbe
Referee: Mustapha Ghorbal (Algeria)

16 January 2022
14:00

Gambia	1–1	Mali
Mu. Barrow 90' (pen.)	Report	Koné 79' (pen.)

Limbe Stadium, Limbe
Referee: Samir Guezzaz (Morocco)

20 January 2022
20:00

Gambia	1–0	Tunisia
A. Jallow 90+3'	Report

Limbe Stadium, Limbe
Referee: Fernando Guerrero (Mexico)

==== Round of 16 ====
24 January 2022
17:00

Guinea	0–1	Gambia
	Report	Mu. Barrow 71'

Kouekong Stadium, Bafoussam
Referee: Amin Omar (Egypt)

==== Quarter-finals ====
29 January 2022
17:00

Gambia	0–2	Cameroon
	Report	Toko Ekambi 50', 57'

Japoma Stadium, Douala
Attendance: 36,259
Referee: Pacifique Ndabihawenimana (Burundi)

=== 2023 Africa Cup of Nations ===
==== Group stage ====
Pos	Team	Pld	W	D	L	GF	GA	GD	Pts	Qualification
1	Senegal	3	3	0	0	8	1	+7	9	Advance to knockout stage
2	Cameroon	3	1	1	1	5	6	−1	4 (Note: Tied on head-to-head points and overall goal difference. Overall goals scored: Cameroon 5, Guinea 2.)	Advance to knockout stage
3	Guinea	3	1	1	1	2	3	−1	4	Advance to knockout stage
4	Gambia	3	0	0	3	2	7	−5	0	

Source: CAF
Notes:
15 January 2024
14:00

Senegal	3–0	Gambia
P. Gueye 4'; Camara 52', 86'	Report

Charles Konan Banny Stadium, Yamoussoukro
Attendance: 7,896
Referee: Redouane Jiyed (Morocco)

19 January 2024
20:00

Guinea	1–0	Gambia
A. Camara 69'	Report

Charles Konan Banny Stadium, Yamoussoukro
Attendance: 19,822
Referee: Abdel Aziz Bouh (Mauritania)

23 January 2024
17:00

Gambia	2–3	Cameroon
Jallow 72'; E. Colley 85'	Report	Toko Ekambi 56'; Gomez 87' (o.g.); Wooh 90+1'

Stade de la Paix, Bouaké
Attendance: 24,172
Referee: Bamlak Tessema Weyesa (Ethiopia)

== Kits ==
2021 Africa Cup of Nations: Home / Away	2023 Africa Cup of Nations: Home / Away
