= Senegal national football team results (2020–present) =

This article provides details of international football games played by the Senegal national football team from 2020 to present.

== Results ==
Key
Win
Draw
Defeat

=== 2020 ===
9 October 2020 Friendly	Morocco	3–1	Senegal	Rabat, Morocco
19:00 UTC+1	Amallah 10'; En-Nesyri 71'; El-Arabi 86'	Report	I. Sarr 88' (pen.)	Stadium: Prince Moulay Abdellah Stadium; Referee: Mamadou Keita (Mali)

13 October 2020 Friendly	Senegal	Cancelled	Mauritania	Thiès, Senegal
19:00 UTC+0				Stadium: Stade Lat-Dior

11 November 2020 2021 AFCONQ	Senegal	2–0	Guinea-Bissau	Thiès, Senegal
16:00 UTC+0	Mané 44' (pen.); Nguette 74'	Report		Stadium: Stade Lat-Dior; Referee: Eric Otogo-Castane (Gabon)

15 November 2020 2021 AFCONQ	Guinea-Bissau	0–1	Senegal	Bissau, Guinea-Bissau
17:00 UTC+0		Report	Mané 82'	Stadium: Estádio 24 de Setembro; Referee: Adil Zourak (Morocco)

=== 2021 ===
26 March 2021 2021 AFCONQ	Congo	0–0	Senegal	Brazzaville, Congo
17:00 UTC+1		Report		Stadium: Stade Alphonse Massemba-Débat; Referee: Mahmoud El Banna (Egypt)

30 March 2021 2021 AFCONQ	Senegal	1–1	Eswatini	Thiès, Senegal
16:00 UTC+0	Kouyaté 90+6'	Report	Gamedze 9'	Stadium: Stade Lat-Dior; Referee: Sekou Ahmed Toure (Guinea)

5 June 2021 Friendly	Senegal	3–1	Zambia	Thiès, Senegal
19:00 UTC+0	Mané 21' (pen.); Diatta 31'; Sarr 44'	Report	Chanda 54'	Stadium: Stade Lat-Dior; Referee: Babacar Sarr (Mauritania)

8 June 2021 Friendly	Senegal	2–0	Cape Verde	Thiès, Senegal
19:00 UTC+0	Gueye 55'; Mané 86' (pen.)	Report		Stadium: Stade Lat-Dior; Referee: Maudo Jallow (Gambia)

1 September 2021 2022 World Cup qualification	Senegal	2–0	Togo	Thiès, Senegal
16:00 UTC+0	Mané 56'; Diallo 81'	Report		Stadium: Stade Lat-Dior; Referee: Sadok Selmi (Tunisia)

7 September 2021 2022 World Cup qualification	Congo	1–3	Senegal	Brazzaville, Congo
17:00 UTC+1	Ganvoula 45+2' (pen.)	Report	Dia 27'; Sarr 82'; Mané 87' (pen.)	Stadium: Stade Alphonse Massamba-Débat; Referee: Mohamed Ali Moussa (Niger)

9 October 2021 2022 World Cup qualification	Senegal	4–1	Namibia	Thiès, Senegal
19:00 UTC+0	Gueye 10'; Diédhiou 38'; Mané 54'; Keita 83'	Report	Kamatuka 75'	Stadium: Stade Lat-Dior; Referee: Kalilou Traoré (Ivory Coast)

12 October 2021 2022 World Cup qualification	Namibia	1–3	Senegal	Johannesburg, South Africa
15:00 UTC+2	Shalulile 27'	Report	Diédhiou 22', 51', 84'	Stadium: Orlando Stadium; Attendance: 0 Referee: Mohamed Youssouf Athoumani (Comoros)

11 November 2021 2022 World Cup qualification	Togo	1–1	Senegal	Lomé, Togo
19:00 UTC+0	Cissé 45+1' (o.g.)	Report	H. Diallo 90+3'	Stadium: Stade de Kégué; Referee: Jalal Jayed (Morocco)

14 November 2021 2022 World Cup qualification	Senegal	2–0	Congo	Thiès, Senegal
21:00 UTC+0	Sarr 14', 24'	Report		Stadium: Stade Lat-Dior; Referee: Fabricio Duarte (Cape Verde)

=== 2022 ===
10 January 2022 2021 AFCON GS	Senegal	1–0	Zimbabwe	Bafoussam, Cameroon
14:00 UTC+1	Mané 90+7' (pen.)	Report		Stadium: Kouekong Stadium; Referee: Mario Escobar (Guatemala)

14 January 2022 2021 AFCON GS	Senegal	0–0	Guinea	Bafoussam, Cameroon
14:00 UTC+1		Report		Stadium: Kouekong Stadium; Referee: Bamlak Tessema Weyesa (Ethiopia)

18 January 2022 2021 AFCON GS	Malawi	0–0	Senegal	Bafoussam, Cameroon
17:00 UTC+1		Report		Stadium: Kouekong Stadium; Referee: Blaise Yuven Ngwa (Cameroon)

25 January 2022 2021 AFCON R16	Senegal	2–0	Cape Verde	Bafoussam, Cameroon
17:00 UTC+1	Mané 63'; Dieng 90+2'	Report	Andrade (red card) 21'; Vozinha (red card) 57'	Stadium: Kouekong Stadium; Referee: Lahlou Benbraham (Algeria)

30 January 2022 2021 AFCON QF	Senegal	3–1	Equatorial Guinea	Yaoundé, Cameroon
20:00 UTC+1	Diédhiou 28'; Kouyaté 68'; Sarr 79'	Report	Buyla 57'	Stadium: Ahmadou Ahidjo Stadium (Note: The match was originally due to be held at Japoma Stadium in Douala, but was relocated.); Referee: Victor Gomes (South Africa)

2 February 2022 2021 AFCON SF	Burkina Faso	1–3	Senegal	Yaoundé, Cameroon
20:00 UTC+1	Touré 82'	Report	Diallo 70'; Gueye 76'; Mané 87'	Stadium: Ahmadou Ahidjo Stadium; Referee: Bamlak Tessema Weyesa (Ethiopia)

6 February 2022 2021 AFCON Final	Senegal	0–0 (a.e.t.) (4–2 p)	Egypt	Yaoundé, Cameroon
20:00 UTC+1		Report		Stadium: Olembe Stadium; Referee: Victor Gomes (South Africa)
	Penalties
	Koulibaly (penalty scored); A. Diallo (penalty scored); B. Sarr (penalty missed); B. Dieng (penalty scored); Mané (penalty scored)		(penalty scored) Zizo; (penalty missed) Abdelmonem; (penalty scored) Hamdy; (penalty missed) Lasheen

25 March 2022 2022 World Cup qualification	Egypt	1–0	Senegal	Cairo, Egypt
21:30 UTC+2	Ciss 4' (o.g.)	Report		Stadium: Cairo International Stadium; Attendance: 70,000; Referee: Jean Jacques Ndala Ngambo (Congo DR)

29 March 2022 2022 World Cup qualification	Senegal	1–0 (a.e.t.) (1–1 agg.) (3–1 p)	Egypt	Diamniadio, Senegal
17:00 UTC+0	Dia 3'	Report		Stadium: Diamniadio Olympic Stadium; Attendance: 45,000; Referee: Mustapha Ghorbal (Algeria)
	Penalties
	Koulibaly (penalty missed); Ciss (penalty missed); Sarr (penalty scored); Dieng (penalty scored); Mané (penalty scored)		(penalty missed) Salah; (penalty missed) Sayed; (penalty scored) El Solia; (penalty missed) Mohamed

4 June 2022 2023 AFCON Q	Senegal	3–1	Benin	Dakar, Senegal
19:00 UTC+0	Mané 12' (pen.), 22', 60' (pen.)	Report	Olaitan 88'	Stadium: Diamniadio Olympic Stadium; Referee: Alaa Sabry (Egypt)

7 June 2022 2023 AFCON Q	Rwanda	0–1	Senegal	Dakar, Senegal
21:00 UTC+2		Report	Mané 90+8' (pen.)	Stadium: Diamniadio Olympic Stadium; Referee: Jean-Jacques Ndala (Congo DR)

24 September 2022 Friendly	Bolivia	0–2	Senegal	Orléans, France
19:15 UTC+2		Report	Dia 4'; Mané 44' (pen.)	Stadium: Stade de la Source; Referee: Bastien Dechepy (France)

27 September 2022 Friendly	Iran	1–1	Senegal	Maria Enzersdorf, Austria
16:30 UTC+2	Azmoun 64'	Report	Pouraliganji 55' (o.g.)	Stadium: Motion invest Arena; Referee: Harald Lechner (Austria)

21 November 2022 2022 World Cup GS	Senegal	0–2	Netherlands	Doha, Qatar
13:00 UTC+3		Report	Gakpo 84'; Klaassen 90+9'	Stadium: Al Thumama Stadium; Attendance: 41,721; Referee: Wilton Sampaio (Brazil)

25 November 2022 2022 World Cup GS	Qatar	1–3	Senegal	Doha, Qatar
16:00 UTC+3	Muntari 78'	Report	Dia 41'; Diédhiou 48'; B. Dieng 84'	Stadium: Al Thumama Stadium; Attendance: 41,797; Referee: Antonio Mateu Lahoz (Spain)

29 November 2022 2022 World Cup GS	Ecuador	1–2	Senegal	Al Rayyan, Qatar
18:00 UTC+3	Caicedo 67'	Report	I. Sarr 44' (pen.); Koulibaly 70'	Stadium: Khalifa International Stadium; Attendance: 44,569; Referee: Clément Turpin (France)

4 December 2022 2022 FIFA World Cup R16	England	3–0	Senegal	Al Khor, Qatar
	Henderson 38'; Kane 45+3'; Saka 57'	Report		Stadium: Al Bayt Stadium; Attendance: 65,985; Referee: Iván Barton (El Salvador)

=== 2023 ===
24 March 2023 2023 AFCON qualification	Senegal	5–1	Mozambique	Dakar, Senegal
20:00 UTC+0	Sabaly 9'; Mané 15'; Ndiaye 32'; Dia 39'; Diallo 88'	Report	Vilanculos 48'	Stadium: Diamniadio Olympic Stadium; Referee: Mutaz Ibrahim (Libya)

28 March 2023 2023 AFCON qualification	Mozambique	0–1	Senegal	Maputo, Mozambique
18:00 UTC+2		Report	Dia 18'	Stadium: Estádio do Zimpeto; Referee: Blaise Yuven Ngwa (Cameroon)

17 June 2023 2023 AFCON qualification	Benin	1–1	Senegal	Cotonou, Benin
20:00 UTC+1	Moumini 78'	Report	Seck 43'	Stadium: Stade de l'Amitié; Referee: Jean Jacques Ndala Ngambo (DR Congo)

20 June 2023 Friendly	Brazil	2–4	Senegal	Lisbon, Portugal
20:00 UTC+2	Paquetá 11'; Marquinhos 58'	Report	H. Diallo 22'; Marquinhos 52' (o.g.); Mané 55', 90+7' (pen.)	Stadium: Estádio José Alvalade; Referee: Gustavo Correia (Portugal)

9 September 2023 2023 AFCON qualification	Senegal	1–1	Rwanda	Butare, Rwanda
21:00 UTC+2	Ma. Camara 66'	Report	Niyonzima 90+6'	Stadium: Stade Huye; Referee: Haythem Guirat (Tunisia)

12 September 2023 Friendly	Senegal	0–1	Algeria	Dakar, Senegal
		Report	Chaïbi 64'	Stadium: Diamniadio Olympic Stadium; Referee: Abdel Aziz Bouh (Mauritania)

16 October 2023 Friendly	Senegal	1–0	Cameroon	Lens, France
	Mané 35' (pen.)	Report		Stadium: Stade Bollaert-Delelis

18 November 2023 2026 World Cup qualification	Senegal	4–0	South Sudan	Diamniadio, Senegal
19:00 UTC+0	P.M. Sarr 1'; Mané 6' 56' (pen.); Camara 45'	Report		Stadium: Diamniadio Olympic Stadium; Referee: Retselisitsoe Molise (Lesotho)

21 November 2023 2026 World Cup qualification	Togo	0–0	Senegal	Lomé, Togo
16:00 UTC+0		Report		Stadium: Stade de Kégué; Referee: Mustapha Ghorbal (Algeria)

=== 2024 ===
8 January Friendly	Senegal	1–0	Niger	Diamniadio, Senegal
18:00 UTC+0	F. Mendy 90+9'	Report		Stadium: Diamniadio Olympic Stadium

15 January 2023 AFCON GS	Senegal	3–0	Gambia	Yamoussoukro, Ivory Coast
14:00 UTC+0	P. Gueye 4'; Camara 52', 86'	Report		Stadium: Charles Konan Banny Stadium; Attendance: 7,896; Referee: Redouane Jiyed (Morocco)

19 January 2023 AFCON GS	Senegal	3–1	Cameroon	Yamoussoukro, Ivory Coast
17:00 UTC+0	I. Sarr 16'; H. Diallo 71'; Mané 90+5'	Report	Castelletto 83'	Stadium: Charles Konan Banny Stadium; Attendance: 19,176; Referee: Mahmood Ismail (Sudan)

23 January 2023 AFCON GS	Guinea	0–2	Senegal	Yamoussoukro, Ivory Coast
17:00 UTC+0		Report	Seck 61'; I. Ndiaye 90'	Stadium: Charles Konan Banny Stadium; Attendance: 15,753; Referee: Pacifique Ndabihawenimana (Burundi)

29 January 2023 AFCON R16	Senegal	1–1 (a.e.t.) (4–5 p)	Ivory Coast	Yamoussoukro, Ivory Coast
	H. Diallo 4'	Report	Kessié 86' (pen.)	Stadium: Charles Konan Banny Stadium; Attendance: 19,948; Referee: Pierre Atcho (Gabon)
	Penalties
	Koulibaly (penalty scored); P. Sarr (penalty scored); Niakhaté (penalty missed); Dieng (penalty scored); Mané (penalty scored)		(penalty scored) Pépé; (penalty scored) Kouamé; (penalty scored) Haller; (penalty scored) Aurier; (penalty scored) Kessié

22 March Friendly	Senegal	3–0	Gabon	Amiens, France
20:30 UTC+1	Appindangoyé 12' (o.g.); Faye 44'; Mané 90+2'	Report		Stadium: Stade de la Licorne; Referee: Stephanie Frappart (France)

26 March Friendly	Senegal	1–0	Benin	Amiens, France
20:30 UTC+1	Mané 59' (pen.)	Report		Stadium: Stade de la Licorne; Referee: Jérémie Pignard (France)

6 June 2026 World Cup qualification	Senegal	1–1	DR Congo	Diamniadio, Senegal
19:00 UTC+0	I. Sarr 45+1'	Report	Mayele 85'	Stadium: Diamniadio Olympic Stadium; Referee: Mutaz Ibrahim (Libya)

9 June 2026 World Cup qualification	Mauritania	0–1	Senegal	Nouakchott, Mauritania
16:00 UTC+0		Report	H. Diallo 27'	Stadium: Stade Cheikha Ould Boïdiya; Referee: Samir Guezzaz (Morocco)

6 September 2025 AFCON qualification	Senegal	1–1	Burkina Faso	Dakar, Senegal
19:00 UTC+0	Mané 18'	Report	Bouda 90+5'	Stadium: Diamniadio Olympic Stadium; Referee: Sedok Selmi (Tunisia)

9 September 2025 AFCON qualification	Burundi	0–1	Senegal	Lilongwe, Malawi
15:00 UTC+2		Report	I. Sarr 71' (pen.)	Stadium: Bingu National Stadium; Referee: Mohamed Maarouf Eid Mansour (Egypt)

11 October 2025 AFCON qualification	Senegal	4–0	Malawi	Dakar, Senegal
19:00 UTC+0	Gueye 35'; Mané 68'; Dia 71'; Jackson 77'	Report		Stadium: Diamniadio Olympic Stadium; Referee: Aklesso Gnama (Togo)

15 October 2025 AFCON qualification	Malawi	0–1	Senegal	Lilongwe, Malawi
15:00 UTC+2		Report	Mané 90+6'	Stadium: Bingu National Stadium; Referee: Bamlak Tessema (Ethiopia)

14 November 2025 AFCON qualification	Burkina Faso	0–1	Senegal	Bamako, Mali
18:00 UTC+0		Report	Diarra 83'	Stadium: Stade du 26 Mars; Referee: Mahmoud El Banna (Egypt)

19 November 2025 AFCON qualification	Senegal	2–0	Burundi	Dakar, Senegal
14:00 UTC+0	Diarra 35', 51'	Report		Stadium: Diamniadio Olympic Stadium; Referee: Mustapha Ghorbal (Algeria)

=== 2025 ===
22 March 2026 FIFA World Cup qualification	Sudan	0–0	Senegal	Benghazi, Libya
21:00 UTC+2		Report		Stadium: Benina Martyrs Stadium; Referee: Patrice Tanguy Mebiame (Gabon)

25 March 2026 FIFA World Cup qualification	Senegal	2–0	Togo	Dakar, Senegal
21:00 UTC+0	P. Sarr 35'; Boma 67' (o.g.)	Report		Stadium: Diamniadio Olympic Stadium; Referee: Peter Waweru (Kenya)

6 June Friendly	Republic of Ireland	1–1	Senegal	Dublin, Ireland
19:45 UTC+1	McAteer 21'	Report	Sarr 82'	Stadium: Aviva Stadium; Attendance: 32,478; Referee: Adam Ladebäck (Sweden)

10 June Friendly	England	1–3	Senegal	Nottingham, England
19:45 UTC+1	Kane 7'	Report	Sarr 40'; Diarra 62'; Sabaly 90+3'	Stadium: City Ground; Attendance: 26,350; Referee: Stéphanie Frappart (France)

5 September 2026 FIFA World Cup qualification	Senegal	2–0	Sudan	Dakar, Senegal
19:00 UTC+0	Koulibaly 14'; P. Sarr 41'	Report		Stadium: Diamniadio Olympic Stadium; Referee: Ahmad Heeralall (Mauritius)

9 September 2026 FIFA World Cup qualification	DR Congo	2–3	Senegal	Kinshasa, DR Congo
17:00 UTC+1	Bakambu 26'; Wissa 33'	Report	Gueye 39'; Jackson 53'; P. Sarr 87'	Stadium: Stade des Martyrs; Referee: Omar Artan (Somalia)

10 October 2026 FIFA World Cup qualification	South Sudan	0–5	Senegal	Juba, South Sudan
15:00 UTC+2		Report	I. Sarr 29', 54'; Mané 46'; Jackson 60' (pen.); C. Ndiaye 75'	Stadium: Juba Stadium; Referee: Abdou Abdel Mefrie (Cameroon)

14 October 2026 FIFA World Cup qualification	Senegal	4–0	Mauritania	Dakar, Senegal
19:00 UTC+0	Mané 45+1', 48'; I. Ndiaye 64'; Diallo 85'	Report		Stadium: Diamniadio Olympic Stadium; Referee: Mohamed Ali Moussa (Niger)

15 November Friendly	Brazil	2–0	Senegal	London, England
16:00 UTC+0	Estêvão 28'; Casemiro 35'	Report		Stadium: Emirates Stadium; Attendance: 58,657; Referee: Jarred Gillett (England)

18 November Friendly	Senegal	8–0	Kenya	Antalya, Turkey
18:00 UTC+3	Jackson 9', 15'; Diouf 12'; Mané 17', 31' (pen.), 35'; Mbaye 48'; C. Ndiaye 80' (pen.)	Report		Stadium: Antalya Stadium; Referee: Atilla Karaoglan (Turkey)

23 December 2025 AFCON GS	Senegal	3–0	Botswana	Tangier, Morocco
16:00 UTC+1	Jackson 40', 58'; C. Ndiaye 90'	Report		Stadium: Ibn Batouta Stadium; Attendance: 18,591; Referee: Abdel Aziz Bouh (Mauritania)

27 December 2025 AFCON GS	Senegal	1–1	DR Congo	Tangier, Morocco
16:00 UTC+1	Mané 69'	Report	Bakambu 61'	Stadium: Ibn Batouta Stadium; Attendance: 41,672; Referee: Lahlou Benbraham (Algeria)

30 December 2025 AFCON GS	Benin	0–3	Senegal	Tangier, Morocco
20:00 UTC+1		Report	Seck 38'; H. Diallo 62'; Koulibaly (red card) 71'; C. Ndiaye 90+7'	Stadium: Ibn Batouta Stadium; Attendance: 26,707; Referee: Samuel Uwikunda (Rwanda)

=== 2026 ===
3 January 2025 AFCON R16	Senegal	3–1	Sudan	Tangier, Morocco
17:00 UTC+1	P. Gueye 29', 45+3'; Mbaye 77'	Report	Aamir Abdallah 6'	Stadium: Tangier Grand Stadium; Attendance: 30,045; Referee: Dahane Beida (Mauritania)

9 January 2025 AFCON QF	Mali	0–1	Senegal	Tangier, Morocco
17:00 UTC+1	Bissouma (yellow card) 23' (yellow-red card) 45+3'	Report	I. Ndiaye 27'	Stadium: Tangier Grand Stadium; Attendance: 32,385; Referee: Abongile Tom (South Africa)

14 January 2025 AFCON SF	Senegal	1–0	Egypt	Tangier, Morocco
18:00 UTC+1	Mané 78'	Report		Stadium: Tangier Grand Stadium; Attendance: 52,079; Referee: Pierre Atcho (Gabon)

18 January 2025 AFCON Final	Senegal	0–3; Awarded (Note: The final match originally finished 1–0 for Senegal after extra time. On 17 March 2026, the CAF Appeal Board ruled that Senegal had forfeited the match for temporarily refusing to play and leaving the pitch in protest of a refereeing decision. Pursuant to articles 82 and 84 of the competition regulations, the final was awarded as a 3–0 win for Morocco, thereby retroactively declaring them as 2025 Africa Cup of Nations champions and stripping Senegal of the title. The following day, the Senegalese Football Federation announced it would appeal the decision to the Court of Arbitration for Sport.)	Morocco	Rabat, Morocco
20:00 UTC+1		Report		Stadium: Prince Moulay Abdellah Stadium; Attendance: 66,526; Referee: Jean-Jacques Ndala (DR Congo)

28 March Friendly	Senegal	2–0	Peru	Paris, France
17:00 UTC+1	Jackson 41'; I. Sarr 54'	Report		Stadium: Stade de France; Attendance: 70,000; Referee: Jeremie Pignard (France)

31 March Friendly	Senegal	3–1	Gambia	Dakar, Senegal
19:00 UTC+0	Seck 45+4'; Mbaye 47'; Camara 90+5'	Report	Colley 51'	Stadium: Diamniadio Olympic Stadium; Referee: Abdelaziz Bouh (Mauritania)

31 May Friendly	United States	3–2	Senegal	Charlotte, North Carolina, United States
15:30 UTC−5	Dest 7'; Pulisic 20'; Balogun 63'	Report	Mané 44', 52'	Stadium: Bank of America Stadium; Attendance: 57,741; Referee: Nick Walsh (Scotland)

9 June Friendly	Saudi Arabia	0–0	Senegal	San Antonio, Texas, United States
		Report		Stadium: Toyota Field; Referee: Víctor Rivas (United States)

16 June 2026 World Cup Group I	France	3–1	Senegal	East Rutherford, New Jersey, United States
15:00 UTC−4	Mbappé 66', 90+6'; Barcola 82'	Report	Mbaye 90+5'	Stadium: MetLife Stadium; Attendance: 80,545; Referee: Alireza Faghani (Australia)

22 June 2026 World Cup Group I	Norway	v	Senegal	East Rutherford, New Jersey, United States
20:00 UTC−4		Report		Stadium: MetLife Stadium; Referee: Wilton Sampaio (Brazil)

26 June 2026 World Cup Group I	Senegal	v	Iraq	Toronto, Ontario, Canada
15:00 UTC−4		Report		Stadium: BMO Field
