= Asbjørn Gaarde =

Danish footballer (born 2003)

Personal information
- Full name: Asbjørn Gaarde Agergaard
- Date of birth: 20 January 2003 (age 23)
- Place of birth: Denmark
- Position: Left winger

Team information
- Current team: FC Skanderborg
- Number: 11

Youth career
- FC Skanderborg
- Horsens

Senior career*
Years	Team	Apps	(Gls)
2021–2022	Horsens	2	(0)
2023–	FC Skanderborg		
- * Club domestic league appearances and goals as of 18:59, 22 December 2021 (UTC)

Asbjørn Gaarde Agergaard (born 10 January 2003) is a Danish footballer who plays as a left winger for FC Skanderborg.

== Career ==
=== Horsens ===
Gaarde joined AC Horsens from FC Skanderborg at the age of 16.

On 19 May 2021, Gaarde was called up for his first professional game. Gaarde got his debut a day later, on 20 May 2021, against SønderjyskE in the Danish Superliga. Gaarde started on the bench, but replaced James Gomez in the 86th minute.

=== Later career ===
In 2023, Gaarde returned to FC Skanderborg.
