= 2023 Africa Cup of Nations Group C =

Football tournament group stage

Group C of the 2023 Africa Cup of Nations took place from 15 to 23 January 2024. The group consisted of defending champions Senegal, Cameroon, Guinea, and Gambia.

Senegal and Cameroon as the top two teams, along with Guinea as one of the four best third-placed teams, advanced to the round of 16.

== Teams ==
Draw position	Team	Zone	Method of qualification	Date of qualification	Finals appearance	Last appearance	Previous best performance	FIFA Rankings	
Draw position	Team	Zone	Method of qualification	Date of qualification	Finals appearance	Last appearance	Previous best performance	October 2023 (Note: The rankings of October 2023 were used for seeding for the final draw.)	December 2023
C1	Senegal	WAFU	Group L winners	28 March 2023	17th	2021	Winners (2021)	20	20
C2	Cameroon	UNIFFAC	Group C winners	12 September 2023	21st	2021	Winners (1984, 1988, 2000, 2002, 2017)	41	46
C3	Guinea	WAFU	Group D runners-up	20 June 2023	14th	2021	Runners-up (1976)	81	80
C4	Gambia	WAFU	Group G runners-up	10 September 2023	2nd	2021	Quarter-finals (2021)	118	126

== Standings ==
Pos	Team	Pld	W	D	L	GF	GA	GD	Pts	Qualification
1	Senegal	3	3	0	0	8	1	+7	9	Advance to knockout stage
2	Cameroon	3	1	1	1	5	6	−1	4 (Note: Tied on head-to-head points and overall goal difference. Overall goals scored: Cameroon 5, Guinea 2.)	Advance to knockout stage
3	Guinea	3	1	1	1	2	3	−1	4	Advance to knockout stage
4	Gambia	3	0	0	3	2	7	−5	0	

Source: CAF
Rules for classification: Group stage tiebreakers

== Matches ==
All times are local, GMT (UTC±0).

=== Senegal vs Gambia ===
It was the first fixture between the two rivalling Senegambian nations in AFCON history, and their first competitive meeting since the 2010 FIFA World Cup qualification, where they played out two draws.

Senegal got off to a perfect start as a ball by Sadio Mané found Pape Gueye, who found the bottom corner. Things got better for the Senegalese when Ebou Adams' reckless tackle on Lamine Camara resulted in his dismissal. With his team having the numerical advantage, Camara raced onto Ismaïla Sarr’s through-ball and slotted a neat finish into the far corner in the 52nd minute. Late on, Camara scored a second time with a spectacular strike into the top corner, assisted by Iliman Ndiaye.

This was the first time Gambia lost a group stage match in the AFCON, having gone undefeated back in 2021.

15 January 2024
14:00

Senegal	3–0	Gambia
P. Gueye 4'; Camara 52', 86'	Report

Charles Konan Banny Stadium, Yamoussoukro
Attendance: 7,896
Referee: Redouane Jiyed (Morocco)

Senegal	Gambia

GK	16	Édouard Mendy
RB	22	Abdou Diallo	(yellow card) 9'	(substituted off) 58'
CB	3	Kalidou Koulibaly (c)
CB	26	Pape Gueye		(substituted off) 79'
LB	19	Moussa Niakhaté		(substituted off) 81'
RM	15	Krépin Diatta
CM	25	Lamine Camara	(yellow card) 90+5'
LM	14	Ismail Jakobs
AM	18	Ismaïla Sarr		(substituted off) 78'
AM	10	Sadio Mané
CF	20	Habib Diallo		(substituted off) 58'
Substitutions:
FW	7	Nicolas Jackson		(substituted on) 58'
MF	11	Pathé Ciss		(substituted on) 58'
FW	13	Iliman Ndiaye		(substituted on) 78'
MF	6	Nampalys Mendy		(substituted on) 79'
DF	4	Abdoulaye Seck		(substituted on) 81'
Manager:
Aliou Cissé

GK	18	Baboucarr Gaye
RB	17	Saidy Janko
CB	12	James Gomez
CB	5	Omar Colley (c)
LB	13	Ibou Touray		(substituted off) 75'
DM	24	Ebrima Darboe		(substituted off) 83'
CM	8	Ebou Adams	(red card) 45+8'
CM	16	Alasana Manneh		(substituted off) 66'
RW	20	Yankuba Minteh		(substituted off) 83'
LW	10	Musa Barrow
CF	26	Ali Sowe		(substituted off) 66'
Substitutions:
MF	2	Hamza Barry		(substituted on) 66'
FW	23	Muhammed Badamosi		(substituted on) 66'
FW	7	Alieu Fadera		(substituted on) 75'
FW	11	Abdoulie Sanyang		(substituted on) 83'
FW	9	Assan Ceesay		(substituted on) 83'
Manager:
(Belgium) Tom Saintfiet

Man of the Match:
Lamine Camara (Senegal)

Assistant referees:
Lahcen Azgaou (Morocco)
Mustapha Akerkad (Morocco)
Fourth official:
Bouchra Karboubi (Morocco)
Video assistant referee:
Samir Guezzaz (Morocco)
Assistant video assistant referee:
Ibrahim Mohammed Abdallah (Sudan)

=== Cameroon vs Guinea ===
Guinea pressed Cameroon early on and were rewarded when Mohamed Bayo scored; his first shot failed to find the net but he took his next opportunity after the Cameroonians' sloppy efforts to clear. However, a reckless challenge by François Kamano on Frank Magri at the end of the first half resulted in Kamano's dismissal. Cameroon capitalised from this when Magri scored with a header thanks to a clinical delivery from Georges-Kévin Nkoudou. However, Cameroon could not press home their numerical advantage over Guinea and had to settle for a draw.

15 January 2024
17:00

Cameroon	1–1	Guinea
Magri 51'	Report	Bayo 10'

Charles Konan Banny Stadium, Yamoussoukro
Attendance: 11,271
Referee: Mutaz Ibrahim (Libya)

Cameroon	Guinea

GK	1	Fabrice Ondoa
CB	21	Jean-Charles Castelletto
CB	2	Harold Moukoudi	(yellow card) 62'
CB	4	Christopher Wooh		(substituted off) 75'
RM	11	Georges-Kévin Nkoudou
CM	8	André-Frank Zambo Anguissa (c)
CM	6	Olivier Kemen		(substituted off) 85'
LM	18	Darlin Yongwa
AM	22	Olivier Ntcham
CF	9	Frank Magri	(yellow card) 21'	(substituted off) 75'
CF	12	Karl Toko Ekambi
Substitutions:
DF	15	Oumar Gonzalez		(substituted on) 75'
DF	14	Junior Tchamadeu		(substituted on) 75'
FW	19	Faris Moumbagna		(substituted on) 85'
Manager:
Rigobert Song

GK	22	Ibrahim Koné
RB	2	Antoine Conte		(substituted off) 56'
CB	17	Julian Jeanvier
CB	5	Mouctar Diakhaby	(yellow card) 63'
LB	21	Sekou Sylla
CM	10	Ilaix Moriba
CM	20	Mory Konaté		(substituted off) 90+6'
RW	7	Morgan Guilavogui		(substituted off) 56'
AM	18	Aguibou Camara
LW	19	François Kamano (c)	(red card) 45+3'
CF	11	Mohamed Bayo		(substituted off) 85'
Substitutions:
FW	25	Facinet Conte		(substituted on) 56'
DF	12	Ibrahim Diakité		(substituted on) 56'
FW	24	José Kanté		(substituted on) 85'
DF	3	Issiaga Sylla		(substituted on) 90+6'
Manager:
Kaba Diawara

Man of the Match:
Mohamed Bayo (Guinea)

Assistant referees:
Khalil Hassani (Tunisia)
Attia Amsaaed (Libya)
Fourth official:
Youcef Gamouh (Algeria)
Video assistant referee:
Mahmoud Ashour (Egypt)
Assistant video assistant referee:
Mahmoud El Banna (Egypt)

=== Senegal vs Cameroon ===
It was their first AFCON encounter since the 2017 Africa Cup of Nations, where Cameroon knocked out Senegal on penalties.

The battle between the two African titans started in Senegal's favour when Ismaïla Sarr struck via a hefty deflection following the Cameroonians' failure to clear Lamine Camara's corner in the 16th minute. Habib Diallo then slid home Sarr’s delivery from the right with Senegal’s first attempt on goal in the second half, in the 71st minute. Jean-Charles Castelletto halved the deficit with a brilliant header from a cross by Olivier Ntcham, but Sadio Mané killed any hope for a Cameroonian comeback with a goal in the fifth minute of added time to secure Senegal's win.

19 January 2024
17:00

Senegal	3–1	Cameroon
I. Sarr 16'; H. Diallo 71'; Mané 90+5'	Report	Castelletto 83'

Charles Konan Banny Stadium, Yamoussoukro
Attendance: 19,176
Referee: Mahmood Ismail (Sudan)

Senegal	Cameroon

GK	16	Édouard Mendy
RB	15	Krépin Diatta
CB	3	Kalidou Koulibaly (c)
CB	22	Abdou Diallo	(yellow card) 58'
LB	14	Ismail Jakobs
DM	26	Pape Gueye
CM	25	Lamine Camara		(substituted off) 90'
CM	17	Pape Matar Sarr		(substituted off) 74'
RW	18	Ismaïla Sarr		(substituted off) 82'
LW	10	Sadio Mané
CF	20	Habib Diallo		(substituted off) 81'
Substitutions:
MF	5	Idrissa Gueye		(substituted on) 74'
FW	7	Nicolas Jackson		(substituted on) 81'
FW	13	Iliman Ndiaye		(substituted on) 82'
MF	11	Pathé Ciss		(substituted on) 90'
Manager:
Aliou Cissé

GK	24	André Onana
RB	26	Enzo Tchato		(substituted off) 90+1'
CB	21	Jean-Charles Castelletto	(yellow card) 48'
CB	4	Christopher Wooh
LB	5	Nouhou Tolo
DM	17	Yvan Neyou	(yellow card) 75'	(substituted off) 79'
CM	8	André-Frank Zambo Anguissa (c)
CM	6	Olivier Kemen	(yellow card) 45+3'
RW	11	Georges-Kévin Nkoudou
LW	3	Moumi Ngamaleu		(substituted off) 74'
CF	9	Frank Magri
Substitutions:
FW	19	Faris Moumbagna		(substituted on) 74'
MF	22	Olivier Ntcham		(substituted on) 79'
DF	14	Junior Tchamadeu		(substituted on) 90+1'
Manager:
Rigobert Song

Man of the Match:
Ismaïla Sarr (Senegal)

Assistant referees:
Ibrahim Mohammed Abdallah (Sudan)
Diana Chikotesha (Zambia)
Fourth official:
Omar Artan (Somalia)
Video assistant referee:
Mahmoud Ashour (Egypt)
Assistant video assistant referee:
Maria Rivet (Mauritius)

=== Guinea vs Gambia ===
Guinea and Gambia had faced each other in a competitive AFCON once, back in 2021 when Gambia shocked Guinea with a 1–0 win.

The game was tense as Guinea proved more dominant than Gambia, but there were no goals until the 69th minute, when Aguibou Camara stretched to convert from Morgan Guilavogui's clever cut-back to win the match as Guinea avenged their 2021 loss by the same scoreline.

19 January 2024
20:00

Guinea	1–0	Gambia
A. Camara 69'	Report

Charles Konan Banny Stadium, Yamoussoukro
Attendance: 19,822
Referee: Abdel Aziz Bouh (Mauritania)

Guinea	Gambia

GK	22	Ibrahim Koné
RB	12	Ibrahim Diakité	(yellow card) 19'	(substituted off) 86'
CB	17	Julian Jeanvier	(yellow card) 89'
CB	5	Mouctar Diakhaby
LB	3	Issiaga Sylla (c)
CM	10	Ilaix Moriba		(substituted off) 87'
CM	23	Abdoulaye Touré
RW	7	Morgan Guilavogui		(substituted off) 77'
AM	18	Aguibou Camara
LW	21	Sekou Sylla		(substituted off) 78'
CF	11	Mohamed Bayo		(substituted off) 90+2'
Substitutions:
MF	8	Naby Keïta		(substituted on) 77'
FW	25	Facinet Conte		(substituted on) 78'
DF	2	Antoine Conte		(substituted on) 86'
MF	6	Amadou Diawara		(substituted on) 87'
FW	24	José Kanté		(substituted on) 90+2'
Manager:
Kaba Diawara

GK	18	Baboucarr Gaye
CB	12	James Gomez
CB	14	Noah Sonko Sundberg		(substituted off) 81'
CB	5	Omar Colley (c)
RWB	17	Saidy Janko
LWB	15	Jacob Mendy
CM	19	Ebrima Colley		(substituted off) 72'
CM	24	Ebrima Darboe		(substituted off) 62'
CM	10	Musa Barrow	(yellow card) 10'
CF	3	Ablie Jallow
CF	7	Alieu Fadera		(substituted off) 62'
Substitutions:
MF	2	Hamza Barry		(substituted on) 62'
FW	20	Yankuba Minteh		(substituted on) 62'
FW	23	Muhammed Badamosi		(substituted on) 72'
FW	26	Ali Sowe	(yellow card) 89'	(substituted on) 81'
Manager:
(Belgium) Tom Saintfiet

Man of the Match:
Aguibou Camara (Guinea)

Assistant referees:
Arsénio Marengula (Mozambique)
Danek Moutsassi (Congo)
Fourth official:
Kalilou Traoré (Ivory Coast)
Video assistant referee:
Dahane Beida (Mauritania)
Assistant video assistant referee:
Bouchra Karboubi (Morocco)

=== Guinea vs Senegal ===
This was their first meeting since facing each other at the 2021 Africa Cup of Nations, which ended in a goalless draw.

Guinea and Senegal looked set for another stalemate until the 61st minute when Krépin Diatta's free-kick delivery was met by Abdoulaye Seck and his header gave Senegal the lead. Iliman Ndiaye then confirmed the win for Senegal with a clinical finish in the 90th minute.

23 January 2024
17:00

Guinea	0–2	Senegal
	Report	Seck 61'; I. Ndiaye 90'

Charles Konan Banny Stadium, Yamoussoukro
Attendance: 15,753
Referee: Pacifique Ndabihawenimana (Burundi)

Guinea	Senegal

GK	22	Ibrahim Koné
RB	2	Antoine Conte	(yellow card) 45+5'	(substituted off) 64'
CB	4	Saidou Sow
CB	13	Mohamed Ali Camara
LB	3	Issiaga Sylla
DM	6	Amadou Diawara
RM	10	Ilaix Moriba		(substituted off) 73'
LM	8	Naby Keïta (c)		(substituted off) 63'
AM	18	Aguibou Camara
CF	25	Facinet Conte	(yellow card) 22'	(substituted off) 78'
CF	9	Serhou Guirassy		(substituted off) 63'
Substitutions:
FW	11	Mohamed Bayo		(substituted on) 63'
FW	7	Morgan Guilavogui		(substituted on) 63'
DF	12	Ibrahim Diakité		(substituted on) 64'
MF	15	Seydouba Cissé		(substituted on) 73'
MF	14	Karim Cissé		(substituted on) 78'
Manager:
Kaba Diawara

GK	16	Édouard Mendy
RB	15	Krépin Diatta	(yellow card) 66'
CB	3	Kalidou Koulibaly (c)
CB	4	Abdoulaye Seck
LB	14	Ismail Jakobs	(yellow card) 45+2'	(substituted off) 88'
DM	26	Pape Gueye		(substituted off) 71'
DM	6	Nampalys Mendy
CM	17	Pape Matar Sarr		(substituted off) 71'
RF	18	Ismaïla Sarr		(substituted off) 72'
CF	20	Habib Diallo		(substituted off) 88'
LF	10	Sadio Mané
Substitutions:
MF	5	Idrissa Gueye		(substituted on) 71'
MF	8	Cheikhou Kouyaté		(substituted on) 71'
FW	13	Iliman Ndiaye		(substituted on) 72'
DF	12	Fodé Ballo-Touré		(substituted on) 88'
FW	7	Nicolas Jackson		(substituted on) 88'
Manager:
Aliou Cissé

Man of the Match:
Abdoulaye Seck (Senegal)

Assistant referees:
Seydou Tiama (Burkina Faso)
Abelmiro dos Reis (São Tomé and Príncipe)
Fourth official:
Mohamed Maarouf (Egypt)
Video assistant referee:
Pierre Atcho (Gabon)
Assistant video assistant referee:
Mahmoud Abou El-Regal (Egypt)

=== Gambia vs Cameroon ===
This was their second meeting in AFCON history, after the previous one in 2021 ended with a Cameroonian victory.

After a goalless first half, the second half was filled with action. First, Karl Toko Ekambi, assisted by Georges-Kévin Nkoudou, got the first goal with a header. However, Ablie Jallow then scored Gambia's first goal in this AFCON, latching onto an inch-perfect cross and drilling home to equalise in the 72nd minute. Ebrima Colley then sent a strong shot into the far corner to put Gambia on course for a win in the 85th minute. However, James Gomez's clumsy effort to clear out ended up as an own goal to equalise for Cameroon just two minutes later, before the final drama arrived in the first minute of extra time when from a corner kick, Christopher Wooh scored a brilliant header to turn the game around. Muhammed Sanneh looked to have equalised for Gambia in the third minute of extra time after yet another brilliant corner, but his effort was ruled out by VAR for handball as Cameroon held firm to win.

This result meant Gambia failed to advance past the group stage of an AFCON for the first time, and lost all three group stage games.

23 January 2024
17:00

Gambia	2–3	Cameroon
Jallow 72'; E. Colley 85'	Report	Toko Ekambi 56'; Gomez 87' (o.g.); Wooh 90+1'

Stade de la Paix, Bouaké
Attendance: 24,172
Referee: Bamlak Tessema Weyesa (Ethiopia)

Gambia	Cameroon

GK	18	Baboucarr Gaye
RB	21	Muhammed Sanneh	(yellow card) 90+6'
CB	12	James Gomez
CB	5	Omar Colley (c)		(substituted off) 69'
LB	15	Jacob Mendy
RM	20	Yankuba Minteh
CM	27	Yusupha Bobb		(substituted off) 69'
CM	16	Alasana Manneh
LM	10	Musa Barrow
SS	3	Ablie Jallow	(yellow card) 77'	(substituted off) 84'
CF	26	Ali Sowe		(substituted off) 73'
Substitutions:
DF	25	Bubacarr Sanneh		(substituted on) 69'
FW	7	Alieu Fadera	(yellow card) 89'	(substituted on) 69'
FW	9	Assan Ceesay		(substituted on) 73'
FW	19	Ebrima Colley		(substituted on) 84'
Manager:
(Belgium) Tom Saintfiet

GK	1	Fabrice Ondoa
RB	26	Enzo Tchato
CB	21	Jean-Charles Castelletto
CB	4	Christopher Wooh
LB	5	Nouhou Tolo
CM	11	Georges-Kévin Nkoudou	(substituted off) 90+7'
CM	8	André-Frank Zambo Anguissa (c)
CM	18	Darlin Yongwa	(substituted off) 80'
AM	22	Olivier Ntcham
CF	9	Frank Magri	(substituted off) 72'
CF	12	Karl Toko Ekambi
Substitutions:
FW	19	Faris Moumbagna	(substituted on) 72'
MF	6	Olivier Kemen	(substituted on) 80'
DF	2	Harold Moukoudi	(substituted on) 90+7'
Manager:
Rigobert Song

Man of the Match:
Christopher Wooh (Cameroon)

Assistant referees:
Jerson Dos Santos (Angola)
Ivanildo Lopes (Angola)
Fourth official:
Youcef Gamouh (Algeria)
Video assistant referee:
Mustapha Ghorbal (Algeria)
Assistant video assistant referee:
Mokrane Gourari (Algeria)

== Discipline ==
Fair play points would have been used as tiebreakers if the overall and head-to-head records of teams were tied. These were calculated based on yellow and red cards received in all group matches as follows:

Only one of the above deductions was applied to a player in a single match.

Team	Match 1				Match 2				Match 3				Points
Team	Booked	(yellow card) (yellow-red card)	Sent off (straight red)	(yellow card) (red card)	Booked	(yellow card) (yellow-red card)	Sent off (straight red)	(yellow card) (red card)	Booked	(yellow card) (yellow-red card)	Sent off (straight red)	(yellow card) (red card)	Points
Senegal	2				1				2				–5
Cameroon	2				3								–5
Guinea	1		1		2				2				–8
Gambia			1		2				3				–8
