= Baboucarr Gaye =

Gambian footballer

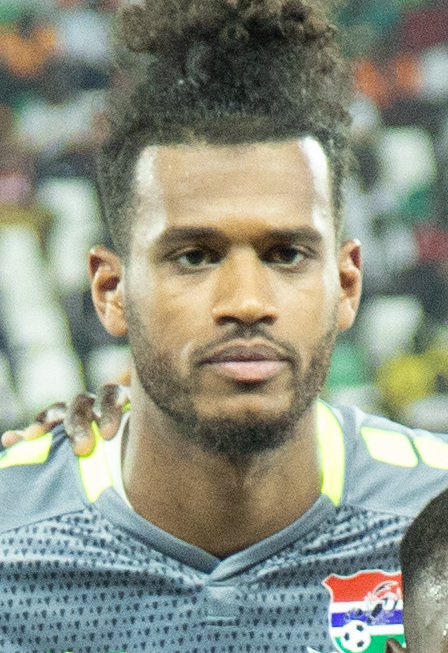
- Gaye in 2024

Personal information
- Date of birth: 24 February 1998 (age 28)
- Place of birth: Bielefeld, Germany
- Height: 1.94 m (6 ft 4 in)
- Position: Goalkeeper

Team information
- Current team: Shkëndija
- Number: 24

Youth career
- 2007–2017: Arminia Bielefeld

Senior career*
Years	Team	Apps	(Gls)
2015–2017	Arminia Bielefeld II	19	(0)
2016–2019	Arminia Bielefeld	0	(0)
2019–2020	Wattenscheid 09	8	(0)
2020	VfB Stuttgart II	0	(0)
2020–2022	FC Rot-Weiß Koblenz (Note: Known as TuS Rot-Weiß Koblenz until 2021)	65	(0)
2022–2023	SV Rödinghausen	0	(0)
2023–2024	Lokomotiv Sofia	16	(0)
2025	Voska Sport	10	(0)
2025–	Shkëndija	26	(0)

International career^{‡}
2020–	Gambia	27	(0)
- * Club domestic league appearances and goals as of 18 June 2026 ‡ National team caps and goals as of 18 June 2026

Baboucarr Gaye (born 24 February 1998) is a professional footballer who plays as a goalkeeper for Macedonian First Football League club Shkëndija. Born in Germany, he plays for the Gambia national team.

== Club career ==
Having spent his youth career with Arminia Bielefeld, it was announced that Gaye would leave the club on 30 June 2019, having never appeared for the first team. On 21 July 2019, he subsequently joined SG Wattenscheid 09. After just nine games, Gaye was forced to find another new club after Wattenscheid filed for bankruptcy in mid-October 2019, forfeiting the rest of their season. In January 2020, the young goalkeeper joined VfB Stuttgart II.

In July 2020, Gaye moved to TuS Rot-Weiß Koblenz. In January 2023, he signed a one-and-a-half-year contract with Bulgarian club Lokomotiv Sofia.

== International career ==
Gaye debuted with the Gambia national team in a friendly 1–0 win over Congo on 9 October 2020.

He played in the 2021 Africa cup of Nations, his national team's first continental tournament, where they made a sensational quarter-final. Gaye was also included in the country's squad for the 2023 Africa Cup of Nations.
