= Pape Gueye =

Senegal international footballer (born 1999)

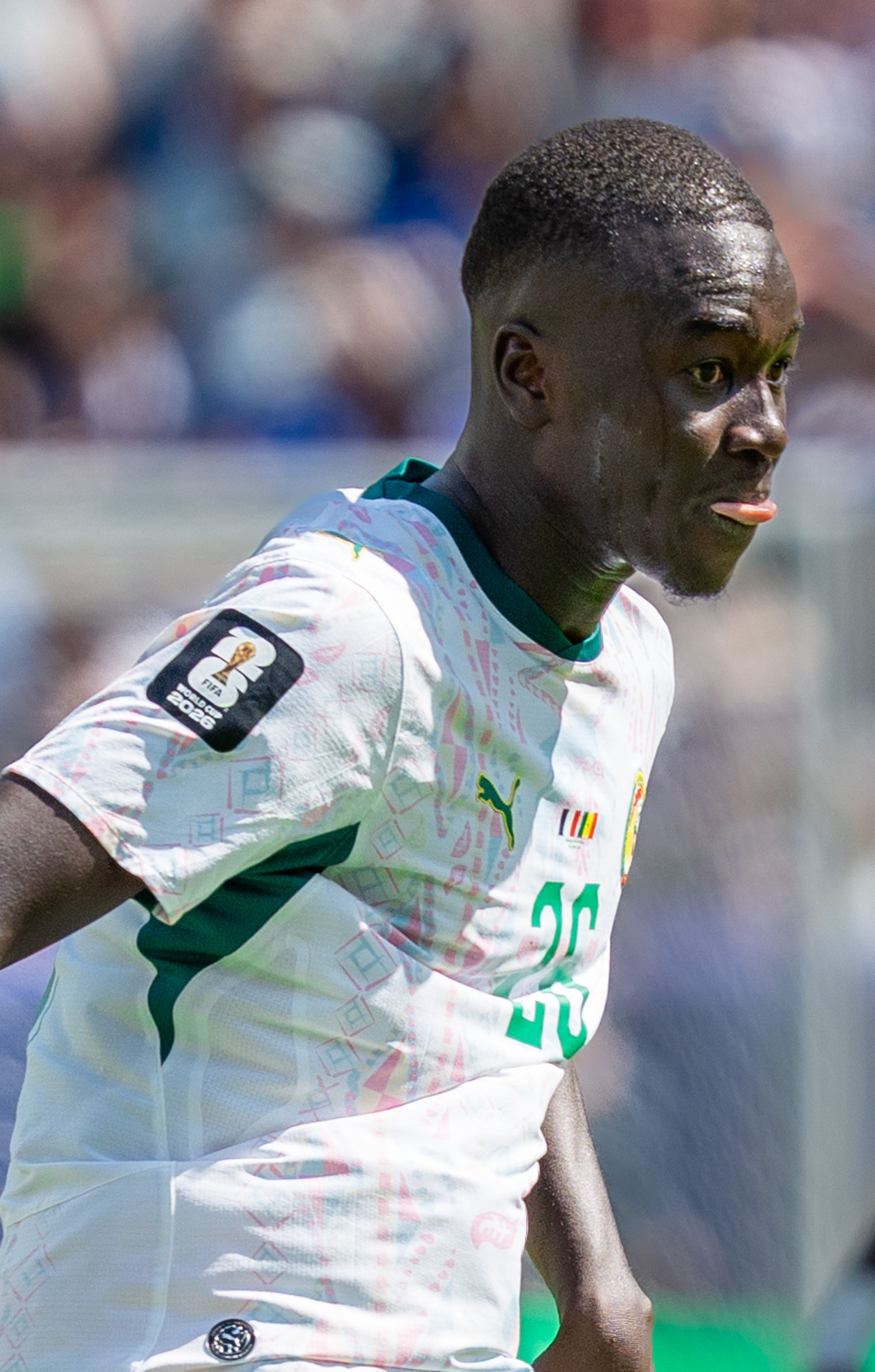
- Gueye playing for Senegal in 2026

Personal information
- Full name: Pape Alassane Gueye
- Date of birth: 24 January 1999 (age 27)
- Place of birth: Montreuil, France
- Height: 1.89 m (6 ft 2 in)
- Position: Midfielder

Team information
- Current team: Villarreal
- Number: 18

Youth career
- 2005–2012: Blanc-Mesnil SF
- 2012–2017: Le Havre

Senior career*
Years	Team	Apps	(Gls)
2016–2019	Le Havre B	39	(2)
2017–2020	Le Havre	39	(0)
2020	Watford	0	(0)
2020–2024	Marseille	89	(4)
2023	→ Sevilla (loan)	16	(1)
2024–	Villarreal	76	(12)

International career^{‡}
2017	France U18	4	(0)
2017	France U19	6	(0)
2021–	Senegal	50	(7)
Medal record
Men's football
Representing Senegal
Africa Cup of Nations
Winner	2021 Cameroon
Runner-up	2025 Morocco
- * Club domestic league appearances and goals as of 22 November 2026 ‡ National team caps and goals as of 16 November 2026

Pape Alassane Gueye (born 24 January 1999) is a professional footballer who plays as a midfielder for La Liga club Villarreal. Born in France, he plays for the Senegal national team.

== Club career ==
=== Le Havre ===
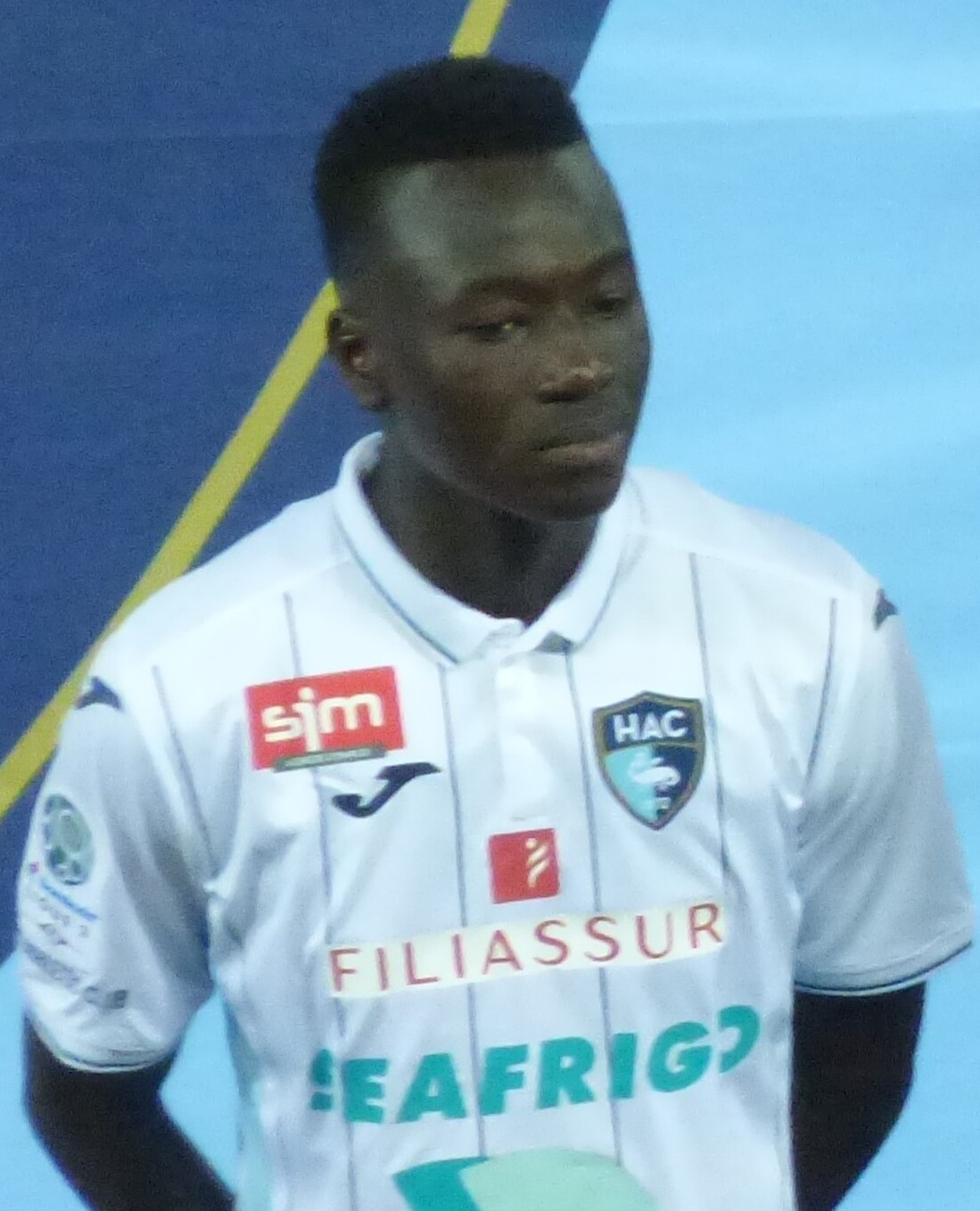
Gueye with Le Havre in 2019

Gueye made his professional debut for Le Havre in a 0–0 Ligue 2 tie with Chamois Niortais on 5 May 2017. He signed his first professional contract on 20 June 2017.

=== Watford ===
On 29 April 2020, it was revealed that Gueye had agreed to join Premier League team Watford when his contract with Le Havre expired on 1 July 2020. Gueye signed a five-year contract with Watford and wore the club's jersey, according to promotional material and a press release made by the club. Twenty-four hours later, Watford agreed a deal for Gueye's transfer to Ligue 1 club Marseille, which included a sell-on clause for Watford. Gueye claimed his agent had given “bad advice”, citing his Watford contract contained a salary of £45,000 per month, not the £45,000 per week that Gueye was originally quoted by his agent.

=== Marseille ===
On 1 July 2020, Gueye signed a four-year deal with Ligue 1 side Marseille, for a reported fee of €3 million (£2.7 million).

==== Loan to Sevilla ====
On 30 January 2023, Gueye was loaned out to La Liga club Sevilla for the remainder of the season. He was cup-tied for Sevilla's victorious 2022–23 UEFA Europa League campaign.

=== Villarreal ===
On 5 July 2024, Gueye joined La Liga club Villarreal on a free transfer for a four-year deal.

== International career ==
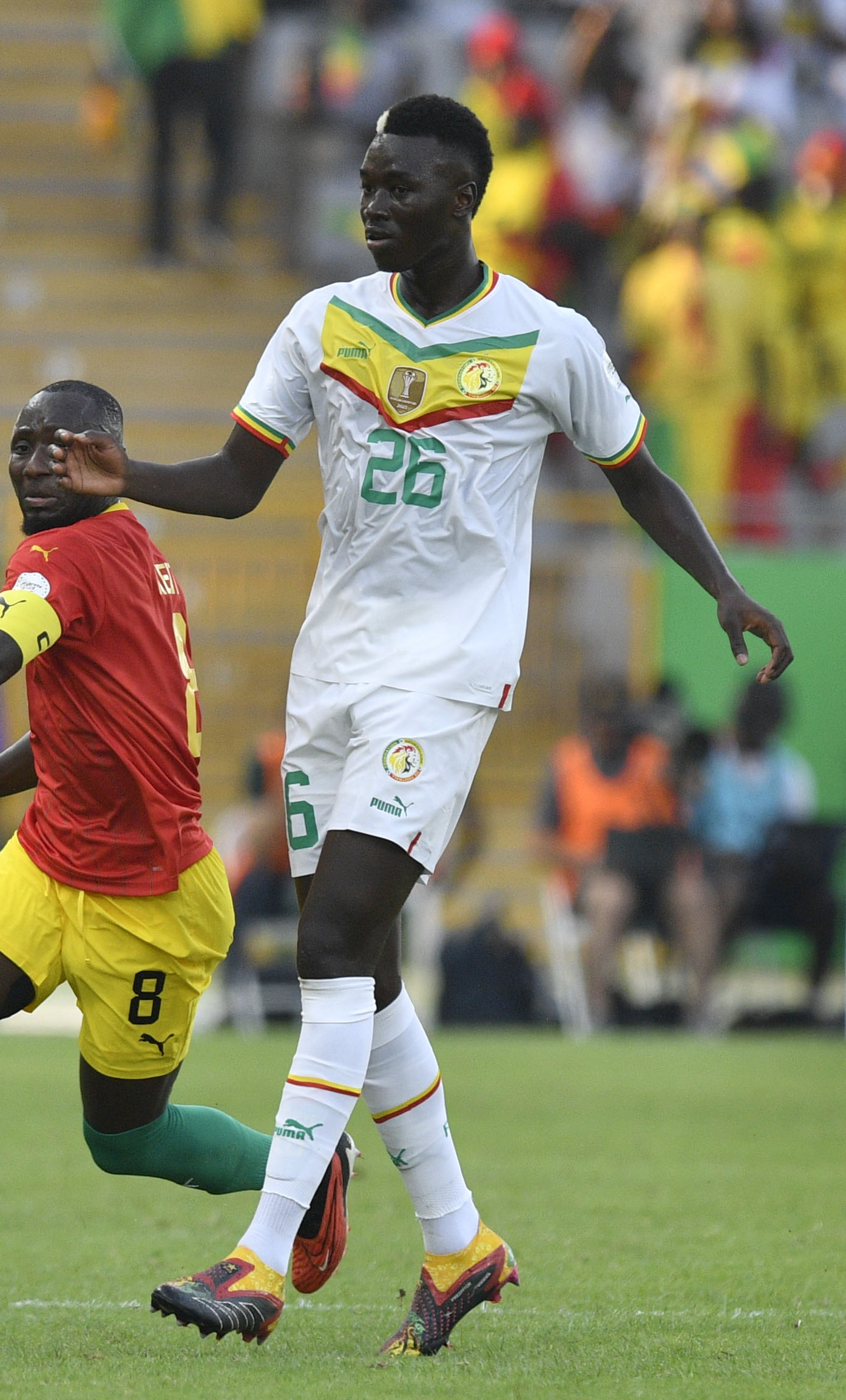
Gueye playing in the 2023 Africa Cup of Nations.

Gueye was born in France and is Senegalese by descent. He represented both the France national under-18 football team and the France U19s. However, he decided to represent Senegal on senior level. He debuted with the Senegal national team in a 2–0 2022 FIFA World Cup qualification win over Congo on 14 November 2021.

He was part of Senegal's squad for the 2021 Africa Cup of Nations; the Lions of Teranga went on to win the tournament for the first time in their history.

Gueye was appointed a Grand Officer of the National Order of the Lion by President of Senegal Macky Sall following the nation's victory at the tournament.

Gueye played in three of Senegal's four matches at the 2022 FIFA World Cup, starting the 2–1 win over Ecuador that qualified the nation for the round of 16 for the first time since its debut in 2002. In December 2023, he was named in Senegal's squad for the postponed 2023 Africa Cup of Nations held in the Ivory Coast.

On 18 January 2026, Gueye scored the winning goal for Senegal in the loss against Morocco in extra time, leading Senegal to win the 2025 Africa Cup of Nations final, however, the match was later deemed forfeited by Senegal and the victory was awarded to Morocco on the 18th of March 2026, due to the Senegalese team walking off the pitch.

On 21 May 2026, Gueye was officially selected by Senegal's coach Pape Thiaw from his list of 28 players to participate in the 2026 FIFA World Cup. A month later, on 26 June, he scored his first World Cup goals, netting a brace and earning the Man of the Match award after coming on as a substitute in a 5–0 victory over Iraq.

== Style of play ==
Gueye is a box-to-box midfielder, noted for his aggressive and highly competitive style of play. He also has a good game viewing and physical strength.

== Career statistics ==
=== Club ===
As of match played 22 November 2026

Appearances and goals by club, season and competition
Club	Season	League			National cup (Note: Includes Coupe de France, Copa del Rey)		League cup (Note: Includes Coupe de la Ligue)		Continental		Other		Total	
Club	Season	Division	Apps	Goals	Apps	Goals	Apps	Goals	Apps	Goals	Apps	Goals	Apps	Goals
Le Havre B	2016–17	Championnat National 2	11	1	—		—		—		—		11	1
Le Havre B	2017–18	Championnat National 2	18	1	—		—		—		—		18	1
Le Havre B	2018–19	Championnat National 2	10	0	—		—		—		—		10	0
Le Havre B	Total		39	2	—		—		—		—		39	2
Le Havre	2016–17	Ligue 2	1	0	0	0	0	0	—		—		1	0
Le Havre	2017–18	Ligue 2	1	0	0	0	0	0	—		—		1	0
Le Havre	2018–19	Ligue 2	12	0	1	0	1	0	—		—		14	0
Le Havre	2019–20	Ligue 2	25	0	1	0	0	0	—		—		26	0
Le Havre	Total		39	0	2	0	1	0	—		—		42	0
Marseille	2020–21	Ligue 1	32	2	2	0	—		4 (Note: Appearances in UEFA Champions League)	0	1 (Note: Appearance in Trophée des Champions)	0	39	2
Marseille	2021–22	Ligue 1	28	0	1	0	—		13 (Note: Six appearances in UEFA Europa League, seven appearances and one goal in UEFA Europa Conference League)	1	—		42	1
Marseille	2022–23	Ligue 1	14	1	2	0	—		3	0	—		19	1
Marseille	2023–24	Ligue 1	15	1	0	0	—		0	0	—		15	1
Marseille	Total		89	4	5	0	—		20	1	1	0	115	5
Sevilla (loan)	2022–23	La Liga	16	1	—		—		0	0	—		16	1
Villarreal	2024–25	La Liga	34	4	2	1	—		—		—		36	5
Villarreal	2025–26	La Liga	30	5	2	0	—		7	0	—		39	5
Villarreal	2026–27	La Liga	12	3	0	0	—		4	0	—		16	3
Villarreal	Total		76	12	4	1	—		11	0	—		91	13
Career total			259	19	11	1	1	0	31	1	1	0	313	21

=== International ===
As of match played 16 November 2026

Appearances and goals by national team and year
National team	Year	Apps	Goals
Senegal	2021	1	0
Senegal	2022	14	0
Senegal	2023	2	0
Senegal	2024	10	2
Senegal	2025	9	1
Senegal	2026	14	4
Total		50	7

Scores and results list Senegal's goal tally first, score column indicates score after each Gueye goal.

List of international goals scored by Pape Gueye
No.	Date	Venue	Opponent	Score	Result	Competition
1	15 January 2024	Charles Konan Banny Stadium, Yamoussoukro, Ivory Coast	Gambia	1–0	3–0	2023 Africa Cup of Nations
2	11 October 2024	Diamniadio Olympic Stadium, Diamniadio, Senegal	Malawi	1–0	4–0	2025 Africa Cup of Nations qualification
3	9 September 2025	Stade des Martyrs, Kinshasa, DR Congo	DR Congo	1–2	3–2	2026 FIFA World Cup qualification
4	3 January 2026	Tangier Grand Stadium, Tangier, Morocco	Sudan	1–1	3–1	2025 Africa Cup of Nations
5	3 January 2026	Tangier Grand Stadium, Tangier, Morocco	Sudan	2–1	3–1	2025 Africa Cup of Nations
—	18 January 2026	Prince Moulay Abdellah Stadium, Rabat, Morocco	Morocco	~~1–0~~	~~1–0~~ (a.e.t.)	2025 Africa Cup of Nations (Note: The final match originally finished 1–0 for Senegal after extra time. On 17 March 2026, the CAF Appeal Board ruled that Senegal had forfeited the match for refusing to play and leaving the pitch in protest of a refereeing decision. Pursuant to articles 82 and 84 of the competition regulations, the final was awarded as a 3–0 win for Morocco, thereby retroactively declaring them as 2025 Africa Cup of Nations champions and stripping Senegal of the title. The following day, the Senegalese Football Federation announced it would appeal the decision to the Court of Arbitration for Sport.)
6	26 June 2026	BMO Field, Toronto, Canada	Iraq	3–0	5–0	2026 FIFA World Cup
7	26 June 2026	BMO Field, Toronto, Canada	Iraq	4–0	5–0	2026 FIFA World Cup

== Honours ==
Senegal

- Africa Cup of Nations: 2021; runner-up: 2025

Individual

- Grand Officer of the National Order of the Lion: 2022
- Africa Cup of Nations Team of the Tournament: 2025
- La Liga African MVP: 2025–26
