= Lamine Camara =

Senegalese footballer (born 2004)

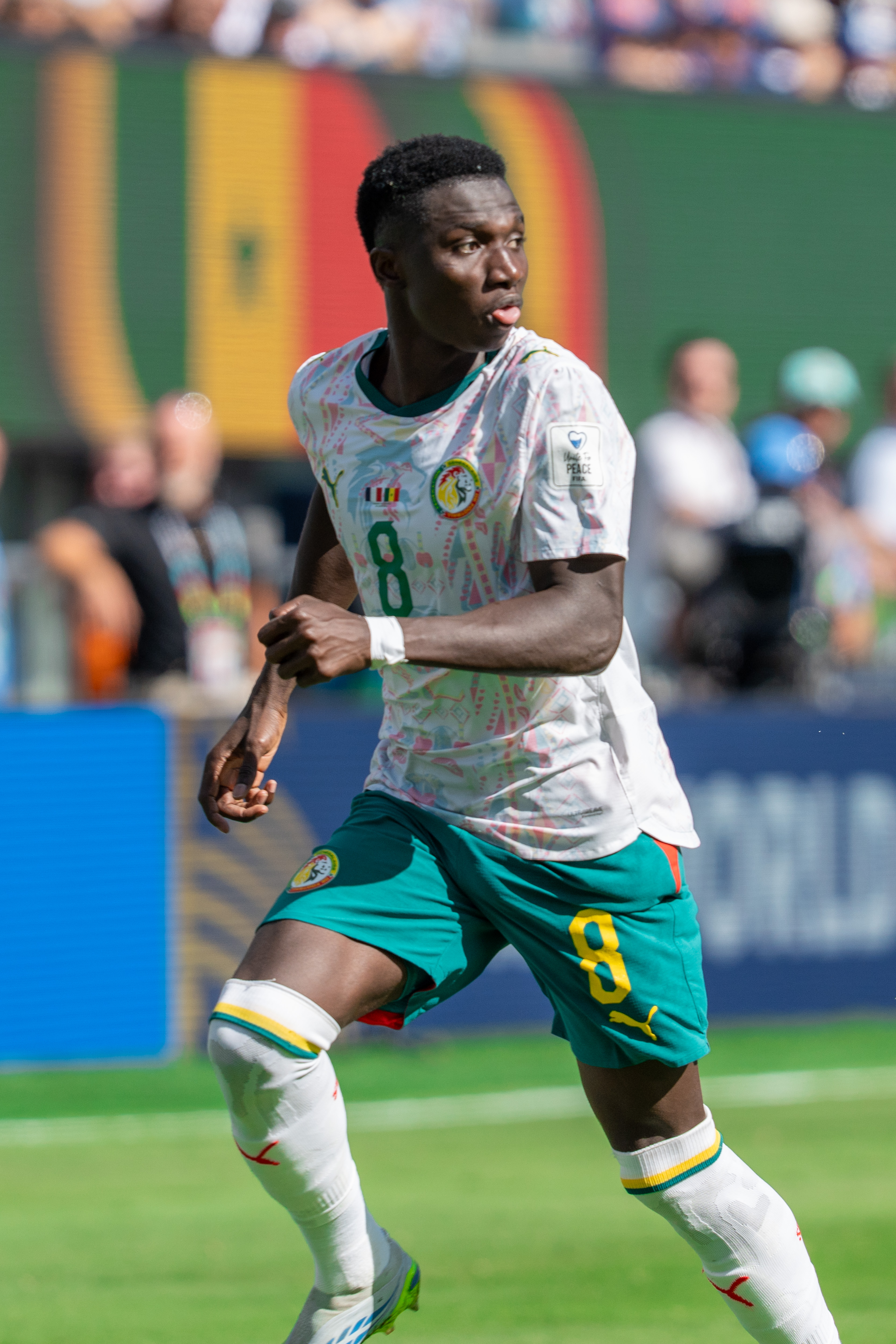
- Camara in 2026

Personal information
- Full name: Lamine Camara
- Date of birth: 1 January 2004 (age 22)
- Place of birth: Diouloulou, Senegal
- Height: 1.73 m (5 ft 8 in)
- Position: Midfielder

Team information
- Current team: Monaco
- Number: 8

Youth career
- Galaxy FA
- Casa Sports
- 2019–2021: Génération Foot

Senior career*
Years	Team	Apps	(Gls)
2021–2023	Génération Foot	23	(2)
2023–2024	Metz	35	(1)
2024	Metz B	1	(0)
2024–	Monaco	60	(5)

International career^{‡}
- Senegal U20
- Senegal U23
2022–	Senegal	52	(7)
Medal record
Men's football
Representing Senegal
Africa Cup of Nations
Runner-up	2025
- * Club domestic league appearances and goals as of 19:11, 18 October 2026 (UTC) ‡ National team caps and goals as of 16 November 2026

Lamine Camara (born 1 January 2004) is a Senegalese professional footballer who plays as a midfielder for Ligue 1 club Monaco and the Senegal national team.

== Club career ==
=== Early career ===
Born in Diouloulou, Camara played for Galaxy FA in Dakar, followed by Casa Sports, before joining Génération Foot in November 2019.

=== Metz ===
In February 2023, Camara signed for French side Metz on a three-and-a-half-year deal. On 15 April, he made his debut, coming off the bench in the 89th minute, in a 3–0 victory over Bordeaux in Ligue 2. In his second match for the club, a 3–1 win at Saint-Étienne, Camara assisted a goal for Koffi Kouao before being sent off in the 79th minute for tripping Mathieu Cafaro. After serving a suspension, Camara made two more appearances as a substitute as Metz gained promotion to Ligue 1 with a third-placed finish.

Camara became a regular in the Metz team upon their return to Ligue 1 and, on 22 October, he scored his first goal for the club in a 2–1 away defeat against Monaco. The goal was scored from his own half, as he hit a first-time strike from a distance of 58 metres (190 ft) over Monaco goalkeeper Philipp Köhn after dispossessing Youssouf Fofana.

After finishing in 16th place in Ligue 1, Metz faced Saint-Étienne in a two-legged play-off. Camara assisted Ismaël Traoré's goal in the away leg and scored the opening goal in the home leg but this was not enough to stop Metz from losing 4–3 on aggregate and being relegated back to Ligue 2.

=== Monaco ===
On 30 July 2024, Camara joined Ligue 1 club Monaco for a transfer fee of €15 million, signing a five-year contract.

On 17 August, Camara made his debut for Monaco in a 1–0 win over Saint-Étienne at the Stade Louis II in the team's opening fixture of the 2024–25 season. In the following match, he scored his first goal for the club in a 2–0 win over Lyon and was later sent off after being shown two yellow cards. He made his UEFA Champions League debut in a 2–1 win over Barcelona during the league phase on 19 September.

On 1 September 2026, it was reported that Camara was set to join Chelsea for €55 million (£47 million). However, the deal collapsed, after Monaco reportedly reneged on the deal.

== International career ==
Camara represented the Senegalese national team at the 2022 African Nations Championship, where he was named best young player of the group stage. He went on to score the only goal of the quarter-final against Mauritania from a penalty kick. In the 2022 African Nations Championship final, he played the full 120 minutes against host nation Algeria and was one of five Senegalese players to score in the penalty shootout as Senegal won their first African Nations Championship.

Camara was then called up to the Senegalese under-20 side for the 2023 Africa U-20 Cup of Nations. He was named Player of the Tournament as Senegal were crowned champions with a perfect record, winning all six matches without conceding a goal.

=== Senior ===
In September 2023, Camara was called up to the senior Senegal team for the first time by coach Aliou Cissé. He made his debut in a 2026 FIFA World Cup qualifier against South Sudan, scoring the third goal of a 4–0 win in Dakar.

In December 2023, he was named in Senegal's squad for the postponed 2023 Africa Cup of Nations held in the Ivory Coast. In the team's opening match against The Gambia, he scored two goals as Senegal won 3–0. He went on to play the full match against Cameroon and the first 87 minutes of the round of 16 match, where Senegal were defeated 5–4 in a penalty shootout by host nation and eventual winners Ivory Coast.

== Career statistics ==
=== Club ===
As of match played 18 October 2026

Appearances and goals by club, season and competition
Club	Season	League			National cup (Note: Includes Coupe de France)		Continental		Other		Total	
Club	Season	Division	Apps	Goals	Apps	Goals	Apps	Goals	Apps	Goals	Apps	Goals
Génération Foot	2021–22	Senegal Premier League	23	2	0	0	—		0	0	23	2
Metz	2022–23	Ligue 2	4	0	0	0	—		—		4	0
Metz	2023–24	Ligue 1	31	1	0	0	—		2 (Note: Appearances in Ligue 1 relegation/promotion play-offs)	1	33	2
Metz	Total		35	1	0	0	—		2	1	37	2
Metz B	2023–24	Championnat National 3	1	0	—		—		—		1	0
Monaco	2024–25	Ligue 1	29	2	1	0	8 (Note: Appearances in UEFA Champions League)	0	1 (Note: Appearance in Trophée des Champions)	0	39	2
Monaco	2025–26	Ligue 1	24	3	1	0	6	0	—		32	4
Monaco	2026–27	Ligue 1	7	0	0	0	3 (Note: Appearances in UEFA Conference League)	1	—		10	1
Monaco	Total		60	5	2	0	17	1	1	0	81	7
Career total			119	8	2	0	17	1	3	1	144	11

=== International ===
As of match played 16 November 2026

Appearances and goals by national team and year
National team	Year	Apps	Goals
Senegal	2022	7	2
Senegal	2023	9	2
Senegal	2024	11	2
Senegal	2025	9	0
Senegal	2026	16	1
Total		52	7

Scores and results list Senegal's goal tally first, score column indicates score after each Camara goal.

List of international goals scored by Lamine Camara
No.	Date	Venue	Opponent	Score	Result	Competition
1	13 July 2022	Princess Magogo Stadium, KwaMashu, South Africa	Eswatini	1–0	1–1	2022 COSAFA Cup
2	15 July 2022	Moses Mabhida Stadium, Durban, South Africa	Zambia	1–1	3–4	2022 COSAFA Cup
3	27 January 2023	19 May 1956 Stadium, Annaba, Algeria	Mauritania	1–0	1–0	2022 African Nations Championship
4	18 November 2023	Diamniadio Olympic Stadium, Diamniadio, Senegal	South Sudan	3–0	4–0	2026 FIFA World Cup qualification
5	15 January 2024	Charles Konan Banny Stadium, Yamoussoukro, Ivory Coast	Gambia	2–0	3–0	2023 Africa Cup of Nations
6	15 January 2024	Charles Konan Banny Stadium, Yamoussoukro, Ivory Coast	Gambia	3–0	3–0	2023 Africa Cup of Nations
7	31 March 2026	Diamniadio Olympic Stadium, Diamniadio, Senegal	Gambia	3–1	3–1	Friendly

== Honours ==
Senegal U20

- U-20 Africa Cup of Nations: 2023
- U-20 West B Zone Tournament: 2022

Senegal

- African Nations Championship: 2022
- COSAFA Cup third place: 2022

Individual

- CAF Youth Player of the Year: 2023, 2024
- U-20 Africa Cup of Nations Player of the Tournament: 2023
- U-20 Africa Cup of Nations Team of the Tournament: 2023
- African Nations Championship Young Player of the group stages: 2022
- African Nations Championship Team of the Tournament: 2022
