= Ibrahim Koné (footballer, born 1989) =

Guinean footballer (born 1989)

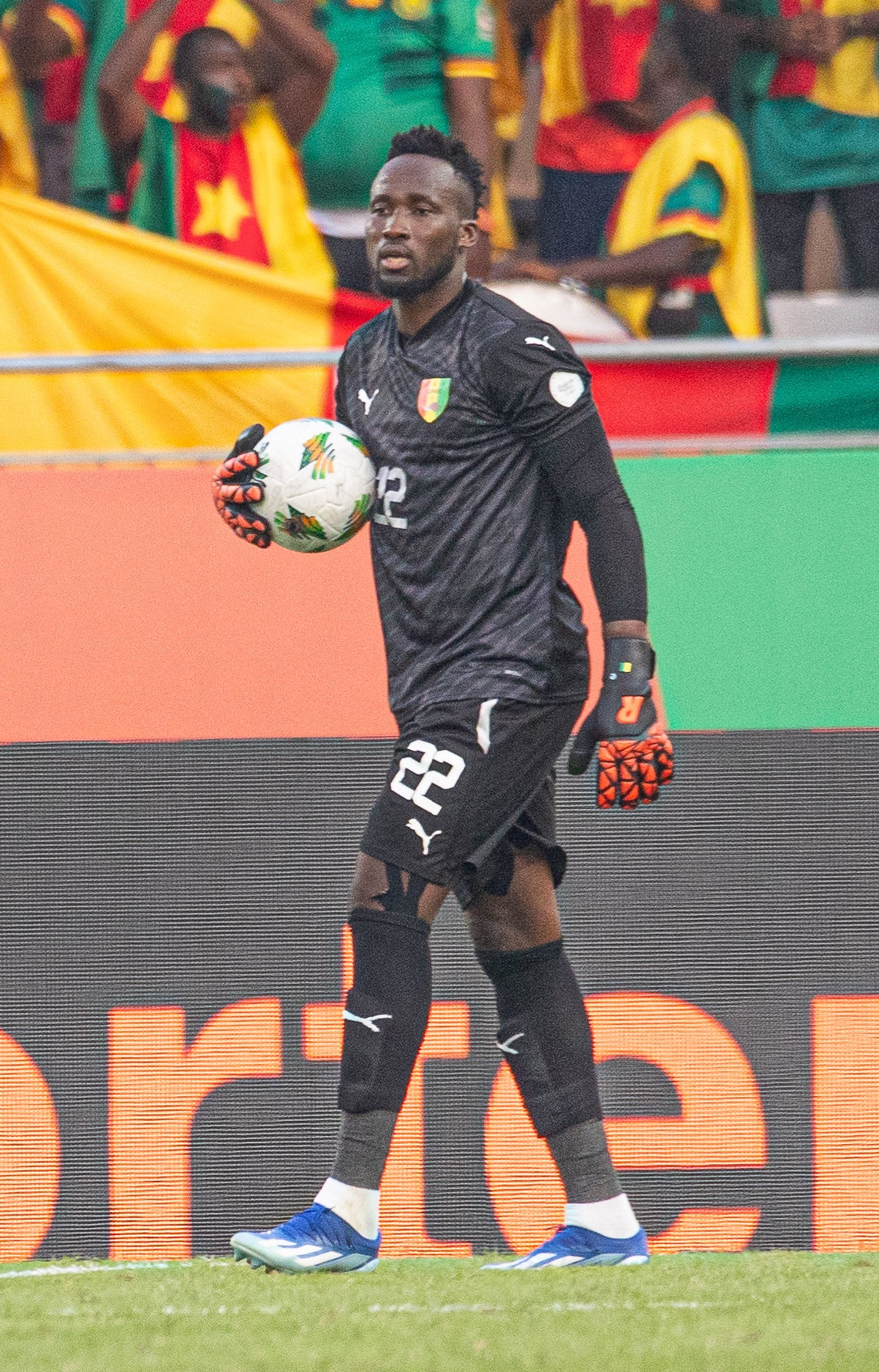
- Koné in 2024

Personal information
- Date of birth: 5 December 1989 (age 36)
- Place of birth: Abidjan, Ivory Coast
- Height: 1.90 m (6 ft 3 in)
- Position: Goalkeeper

Team information
- Current team: Boulogne
- Number: 16

Youth career
- CF Excellence

Senior career*
Years	Team	Apps	(Gls)
2007–2008	AS Denguélé		
2008–2013	Boulogne	5	(0)
2014–2016	Tarbes	39	(0)
2016–2019	Pau	66	(0)
2020	Stade Bordelais	7	(0)
2020–2021	Żejtun Corinthians	3	(0)
2021–2024	Hibernians	53	(0)
2024–2025	USL Dunkerque	1	(0)
2025–	Boulogne	8	(0)

International career^{‡}
2007	Ivory Coast U20	7	(0)
2018–	Guinea	25	(0)
- * Club domestic league appearances and goals as of 12 May 2026 ‡ National team caps and goals as of 22:38, 2 February 2024 (UTC)

Ibrahim Koné (born 5 December 1989) is a professional footballer who plays as a goalkeeper for French Ligue 2 club Boulogne. Born in the Ivory Coast, he represents Guinea at international level.

== Career ==
Born in Abidjan, Koné began his career with CF Excellence and joined later AS Odienné in his native Ivory Coast. In January 2008, he was on trial for several weeks with Rosenborg BK in Trondheim and was with those in a trainings camp in Gran Canaria. On 19 July 2008, he left AS Odienné and joined on trial Paris Saint-Germain, but he later signed for US Boulogne. Koné made his debut on 23 September 2009 against Paris Saint-Germain in the Coupe de la Ligue. He played all the 90 minutes on the field.

== International career ==
Koné represented Ivory Coast at the 2007 Toulon Tournament and was voted as the best goalkeeper. and was formerly the back-up keeper at 2005 FIFA U-17 World Championship in Peru.

Of Guinean descent, Koné accepted a callup to represent the Guinea national football team on 25 April 2018. He was included in the country's squad for the 2023 Africa Cup of Nations.

== Career statistics ==
=== International ===
As of matches played on 2 February 2024

Guinea national team
Year	Apps	Goals
2018	1	0
2019	4	0
2022	6	0
2023	8	0
2024	6	0
Total	25	0

== Honours ==
Individual

- Toulon Tournament Best Goalkeeper: 2007
