= Aguibou Camara =

Guinean footballer (born 2001)

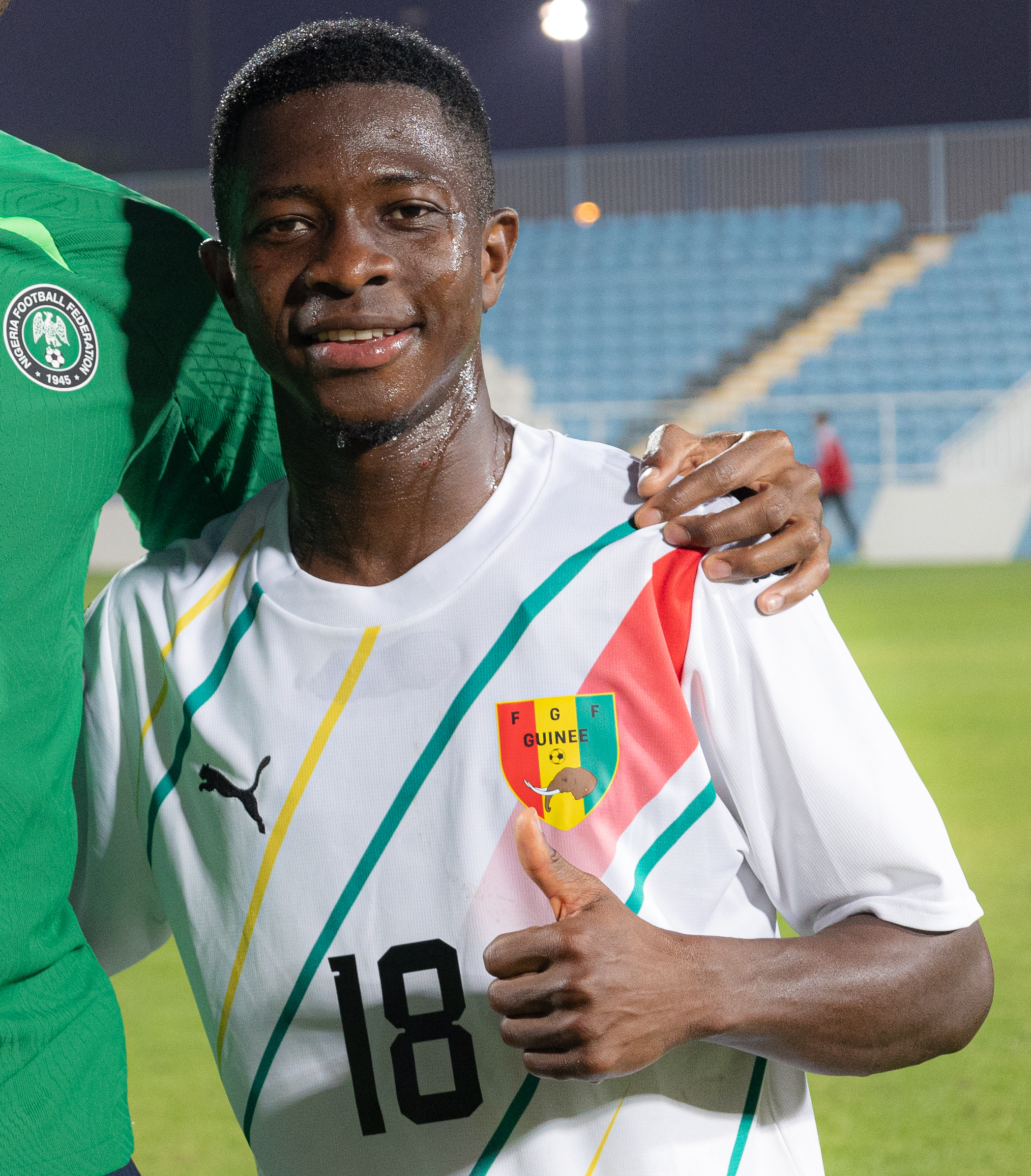
- Camara with Guinea in 2024

Personal information
- Date of birth: 20 May 2001 (age 25)
- Place of birth: Matam, Guinea
- Height: 1.67 m (5 ft 6 in)
- Positions: Attacking midfielder; winger

Team information
- Current team: Ludogorets Razgrad
- Number: 20

Youth career
- –2019: Eléphant Coléah
- 2019–2020: Lille

Senior career*
Years	Team	Apps	(Gls)
2019–2021	Lille II	21	(2)
2020–2021	Lille	0	(0)
2021–2024	Olympiacos	32	(5)
2023	Olympiacos B	1	(0)
2023–2024	→ Atromitos (loan)	34	(5)
2024–	Ludogorets Razgrad	36	(0)

International career^{‡}
2017	Guinea U17	3	(0)
2018	Guinea U20	2	(1)
2022–	Guinea U23	6	(1)
2019–	Guinea	38	(6)
- * Club domestic league appearances and goals as of 9 September 2026 ‡ National team caps and goals as of 12 September 2026

Aguibou Camara (born 20 May 2001) is a Guinean professional footballer who plays as an attacking midfielder or a winger for Bulgarian First League club Ludogorets Razgrad and the Guinea national team.

== Club career ==
On 29 March 2019, Camara signed his first professional contract with Lille in France, with the deal lasting for five years. He made his professional debut in a Coupe de France match against Dijon on 10 February 2021, and scored in the 15th minute of the game.

On 13 July 2021, he joined Olympiacos. The 20-year-old joined the Greek giants from Lille in the summer, having only played once for the reigning Ligue 1 champions. The Guinea international has quickly forced himself into Pedro Martins' plans. On 6 August 2021, he scored his first goal with the club against Ludogorets Razgrad, as a late substitute, helping Olympiacos to avoid overall defeat at Karaiskaki Stadium in the first match of the third qualifying round of 2021–22 UEFA Champions League qualifying phase and play-off round.

On 17 October 2021, he opened the score in a 2–1 away win against PAS Giannina and a week later he opened the score in a 2−1 home derby game against rivals PAOK, being the main protagonist of the match. On 21 November, he opened the scoring in a triumphant 3−2 away win against rivals AEK. On 6 February 2022, he opened the score in a 3–0 away win against Ionikos.

In July 2024, Camara signed a contract with Bulgarian team Ludogorets Razgrad.

== International career ==
A youth international for Guinea, Camara represented the Guinea U20s for the 2019 Africa U-20 Cup of Nations qualification matches. He made his senior debut for Guinea in a 1–0 friendly loss to the Comoros on 12 October 2019. On 21 December 2021, he was called up for the 2021 Africa Cup of Nations.

In June 2023, he was included in the final squad of the Guinean under-23 national team for the 2023 U-23 Africa Cup of Nations, hosted in Morocco, where the Syli finished in fourth place. A year later, his club, Olympiacos, denied him permission to compete in the 2024 Summer Olympics.

== Career statistics ==
=== Club ===
As of match played 17 December 2023

Appearances and goals by club, season and competition
Club	Season	League			National cup (Note: Includes Coupe de France, Greek Football Cup)		Europe		Total	
Club	Season	Division	Apps	Goals	Apps	Goals	Apps	Goals	Apps	Goals
Lille	2020–21	Ligue 1	0	0	1	1	0	0	1	1
Olympiacos	2021–22	Super League Greece	26	4	2	0	12 (Note: Two appearances and one goal in UEFA Champions League, eight appearances in UEFA Europa League)	1	40	5
Olympiacos	2022–23	Super League Greece	6	0	1	0	4	1	11	1
Olympiacos	Total		32	4	3	0	16	2	51	6
Atromitos (Ioan)	2022–23	Super League Greece	12	3	0	0	–		12	3
Atromitos (Ioan)	2023–24	Super League Greece	13	1	1	0	–		14	1
Atromitos (Ioan)	Total		25	4	1	0	0	0	26	4
Career total			57	8	5	1	16	2	78	11

=== International ===
Scores and results list Guinea's goal tally first.

No	Date	Venue	Opponent	Score	Result	Competition
1.	11 June 2021	Arslan Zeki Demirci Sports Complex, Manavgat, Turkey	Niger	1–1	2–1	Friendly
2.	9 September 2023	Bingu National Stadium, Lilongwe, Malawi	Malawi	1–1	2–2	2023 Africa Cup of Nations qualification
3.	17 November 2023	Berkane Municipal Stadium, Berkane, Morocco	Uganda	1–0	2–1	2026 FIFA World Cup qualification
4.	8 January 2024	Baniyas Stadium, Abu Dhabi, United Arab Emirates	Nigeria	1–0	2–0	Friendly
5.	19 January 2024	Charles Konan Banny Stadium, Yamoussoukro, Ivory Coast	Gambia	1–0	1–0	2023 Africa Cup of Nations
6.	6 June 2024	Nelson Mandela Stadium, Algiers, Algeria	Algeria	2–1	2–1	2026 FIFA World Cup qualification

== Honours ==
Olympiacos

- Super League Greece: 2021–22

Ludogorets Razgrad

- Bulgarian First League: 2024–25
- Bulgarian Cup: 2024–25
- Bulgarian Supercup: 2024

Individual

- IFFHS CAF Youth Men's Team of the Year: 2021
