= Ablie Jallow =

Gambian footballer (born 1998)

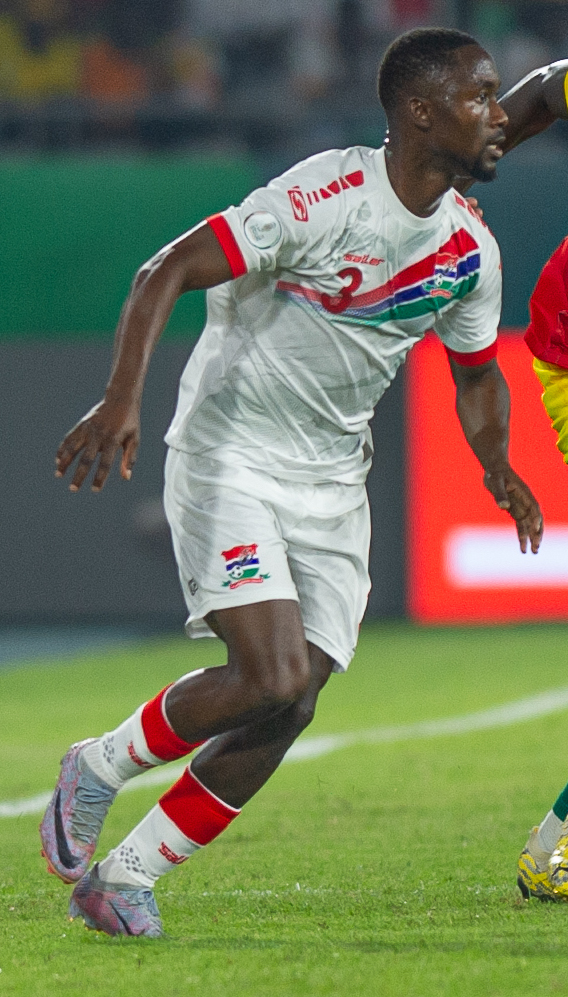
- Jallow with Gambia in 2024

Personal information
- Date of birth: 14 November 1998 (age 27)
- Place of birth: Bundung, The Gambia
- Height: 1.66 m (5 ft 5 in)
- Position: Winger

Team information
- Current team: Servette
- Number: 30

Senior career*
Years	Team	Apps	(Gls)
2015–2016	Real de Banjul		
2015–2016	→ Génération Foot (loan)		
2016–2017	Génération Foot		
2017–2018	Metz II	9	(0)
2017–2025	Metz	90	(14)
2019–2020	→ Ajaccio (loan)	11	(1)
2020	→ Ajaccio II (loan)	2	(0)
2020–2022	→ Seraing (loan)	44	(10)
2025–	Servette	11	(1)

International career^{‡}
2015–	Gambia	31	(8)
- * Club domestic league appearances and goals as of 26 May 2026 ‡ National team caps and goals as of 23:00, 23 January 2024 (UTC)

Ablie Jallow (born 14 November 1998) is a Gambian professional footballer who plays as a winger for Swiss Super League club Servette and the Gambia national team.

== Club career ==
Jallow was born in Bundung, and spent his early career with Real de Banjul and Génération Foot.

In July 2017, Jallow signed a five-year contract with Ligue 1 side Metz. In September 2019 he moved on loan to Ajaccio. In August 2020, Jallow again left Metz on loan, joining Belgian club Seraing along with five other Metz loanees.

On 1 July 2025, Jallow signed a three-season contract with Servette in Switzerland.

== International career ==
Jallow made his international debut for Gambia in 2015. On 12 January 2021, Jallow scored Gambia's first ever Africa Cup of Nations goal in a 1–0 win over Mauritania.

== Career statistics ==
Scores and results list Gambia's goal tally first, score column indicates score after each Jallow goal.

List of international goals scored by Ablie Jallow
No.	Date	Venue	Opponent	Score	Result	Competition
1	17 November 2018	Independence Stadium, Bakau, Gambia	Benin	3–1	3–1	2019 Africa Cup of Nations qualification
2	13 October 2019	Independence Stadium, Bakau, Gambia	Djibouti	1–1	1–1 (3–2 p)	2021 Africa Cup of Nations qualification
3	5 June 2021	Arslan Zeki Demirci Sports Complex, Manavgat, Turkey	Niger	1–0	2–0	Friendly
4	12 January 2022	Limbe Stadium, Limbe, Cameroon	Mauritania	1–0	1–0	2021 Africa Cup of Nations
5	20 January 2022	Limbe Stadium, Limbe, Cameroon	Tunisia	1–0	1–0	2021 Africa Cup of Nations
6	4 June 2022	Stade Lat-Dior, Thiès, Senegal	South Sudan	1–0	1–0	2023 Africa Cup of Nations qualification
7	14 June 2023	Suez Canal Stadium, Ismailia, Egypt	South Sudan	2–1	3–2	2023 Africa Cup of Nations qualification
8	23 January 2024	Stade de la Paix, Bouaké, Ivory Coast	Cameroon	1–1	2–3	2023 Africa Cup of Nations
