= Ebrima Colley =

Gambian footballer (born 2000)

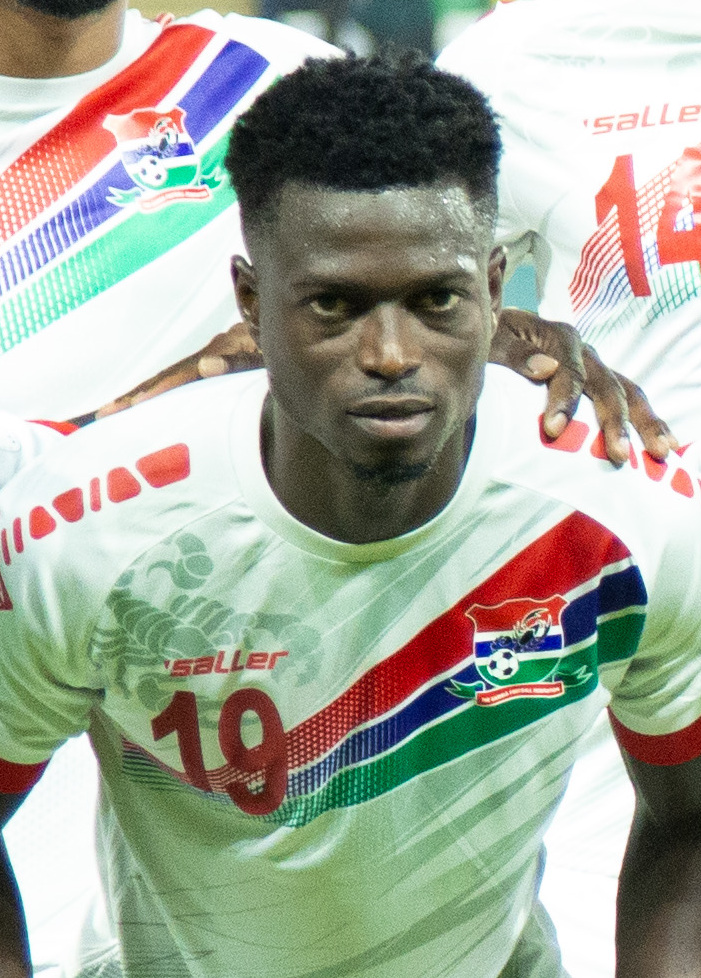
- Colley in 2024

Personal information
- Date of birth: 1 February 2000 (age 26)
- Place of birth: Serekunda, The Gambia
- Height: 1.79 m (5 ft 10 in)
- Position: Winger

Team information
- Current team: Konyaspor (on loan from Young Boys)
- Number: 19

Youth career
- 2017–2019: Atalanta

Senior career*
Years	Team	Apps	(Gls)
2019–2024	Atalanta	5	(0)
2020–2021	→ Hellas Verona (loan)	23	(1)
2021–2022	→ Spezia (loan)	11	(0)
2022–2023	→ Fatih Karagümrük (loan)	24	(1)
2023–2024	→ Young Boys (loan)	24	(3)
2024–	Young Boys	43	(5)
2026–	→ Konyaspor (loan)	2	(1)

International career^{‡}
2019–	Gambia	31	(5)
- * Club domestic league appearances and goals as of 22:30, 22 August 2026 (UTC) ‡ National team caps and goals as of 29 September 2026

Ebrima Colley (born 1 February 2000) is a Gambian professional footballer who plays as a winger for Turkish Süper Lig club Konyaspor on loan from Swiss club Young Boys, and the Gambia national team.

== Club career ==
Colley started playing for Atalanta's under-19 squad in the 2017–18 season. He made his professional debut for the senior team in a 1–2 Serie A loss to Bologna on 15 December 2019.

On 23 September 2020, Colley joined Serie A side Hellas Verona on loan for the remainder of the season.

On 7 August 2021, Colley joined fellow top-tier club Spezia on loan until the end of the campaign. On 13 August 2022, Colley was loaned to Süper Lig club Fatih Karagümrük for the rest of the season.

On 1 September 2023, Colley joined Swiss Super League club Young Boys on loan for the remainder of the season, with the deal including an option-to-buy. Later that year, on 13 December, he became the first Gambian to score in the UEFA Champions League, by netting a goal in a 2–1 away defeat against RB Leipzig.

On 15 July 2026, Colley agreed to return to Turkey and joined Konyaspor on a season-long loan, with an option to buy.

== International career ==
Colley made his debut for the Gambia national football team on 22 March 2019 in an Africa Cup of Nations qualifier against Algeria, as a 81st-minute substitute for Ebrima Sohna.

He played in the 2021 Africa Cup of Nations, his national team's first continental tournament, where they made a sensational quarter-final.

== Career statistics ==
=== Club ===
As of match played 17 May 2026

Appearances and goals by club, season and competition
Club	Season	League			National Cup		Continental		Total	
Club	Season	Division	Apps	Goals	Apps	Goals	Apps	Goals	Apps	Goals
Atalanta	2019–20	Serie A	5	0	0	0	0	0	5	0
Hellas Verona (loan)	2020–21	Serie A	23	1	2	1	—		25	2
Spezia (loan)	2021–22	Serie A	11	0	1	1	—		12	1
Fatih Karagümrük (loan)	2022–23	Süper Lig	27	1	3	1	—		30	2
Young Boys (loan)	2023–24	Swiss Super League	24	3	2	0	3 (Note: Two appearances in UEFA Champions League, one appearance in UEFA Europa League)	1	29	1
Young Boys	2024–25	Swiss Super League	26	3	4	1	9 (Note: Appearances in UEFA Champions League)	0	39	4
Young Boys	2025-26	Swiss Super League	17	2	2	0	4 (Note: Appearances in UEFA Europa League)	0	23	2
Young Boys	Total		43	5	6	1	13	0	62	6
Career total			133	8	14	4	16	1	163	12

=== International ===
As of match played 29 September 2026

Appearances and goals by national team and year
National team	Year	Apps	Goals
Gambia	2019	7	0
Gambia	2020	2	0
Gambia	2021	1	0
Gambia	2022	6	0
Gambia	2023	6	1
Gambia	2024	6	1
Gambia	2026	3	3
Total		31	5

Scores and results list Gambia's goal tally first.

List of international goals scored by Ebrima Colley
No.	Date	Venue	Opponent	Score	Result	Competition
1.	16 November 2023	Benjamin Mkapa Stadium, Miburani, Tanzania	Burundi	2–3	2–3	2026 FIFA World Cup qualification
2.	23 January 2024	Bouaké Stadium, Bouaké, Ivory Coast	Cameroon	2–1	2–3	2023 Africa Cup of Nations
3.	25 September 2026	Independence Stadium, Bakau, Gambia	Somalia	1–0	2–1	2027 Africa Cup of Nations qualification
4.	29 September 2026	Accra Sports Stadium, Accra, Ghana	Ghana	3–2	4–2	2027 Africa Cup of Nations qualification
5.	29 September 2026	Accra Sports Stadium, Accra, Ghana	Ghana	4–2	4–2	2027 Africa Cup of Nations qualification
