= James Gomez (footballer) =

Gambian footballer (born 2001)

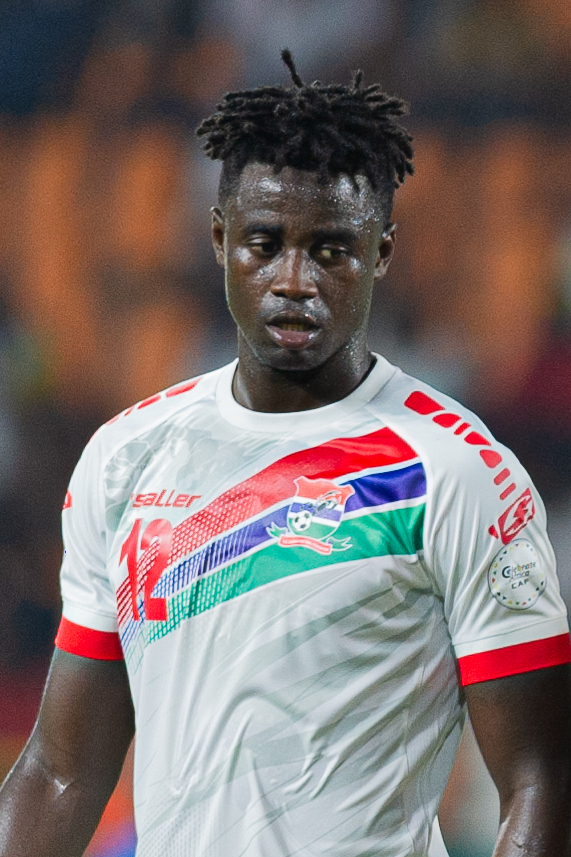
- Gomez with Gambia in 2024

Personal information
- Date of birth: 14 November 2001 (age 24)
- Place of birth: Bakary Sambouya, The Gambia
- Height: 1.89 m (6 ft 2 in)
- Position: Centre-back

Team information
- Current team: OB
- Number: 29

Youth career
- –2020: Real de Banjul

Senior career*
Years	Team	Apps	(Gls)
2020	Real de Banjul		
2020	→ AC Horsens (loan)	4	(0)
2021–2023	AC Horsens	69	(2)
2023–2024	Sparta Prague	5	(0)
2024–	OB	52	(2)

International career^{‡}
- Gambia U20
- Gambia U23
2021–	Gambia	20	(1)
- * Club domestic league appearances and goals as of 20:36, 9 August 2026 (UTC) ‡ National team caps and goals as of 24 January 2024

James Gomez (born 14 November 2001) is a Gambian professional footballer who plays as a centre-back for Danish Superliga club Odense Boldklub, and the Gambia national team.

== Club career ==
Having progressed through the academy of Real de Banjul, Gomez moved on loan to Danish club AC Horsens on 20 January 2020. On 4 August, the loan was extended for another six months. On 23 December 2020, he signed a permanent deal with the club on a contract until 2024.

On 19 July 2023, Gomez signed a multi-year contract with Czech First League club Sparta Prague.

On 1 February 2024, Gomez signed a contract with Danish Superliga club Odense until 2028.

== International career ==
He made his debut for Gambia national football team on 8 June 2021 in a friendly against Togo and scored the only goal of the game.

He was selected for 2021 Africa Cup of Nations in January 2022, in which the Gambia participates for the first time, and was featured in a 1-0 victory against Mauritania where he was a holder in central defense.

== Career statistics ==
=== Club ===
As of match played 23 October 2022

Appearances and goals by club, season and competition
Club	Season	League			Danish Cup		Other		Total	
Club	Season	Division	Apps	Goals	Apps	Goals	Apps	Goals	Apps	Goals
AC Horsens (loan)	2019–20	Danish Superliga	3	0	0	0	0	0	3	0
AC Horsens	2020–21	Danish Superliga	13	1	2	0	0	0	15	1
AC Horsens	2021–22	Danish 1st Division	31	0	2	0	0	0	33	0
AC Horsens	2022–23	Danish Superliga	14	1	0	0	0	0	14	1
Career total			61	2	4	0	0	0	65	2

=== International ===
As of match played 8 June 2022

Appearances and goals by national team and year
National team	Year	Apps	Goals
Gambia	2021	4	1
Gambia	2022	8	0
Total		12	1

Scores and results list Gambia's goal tally first, score column indicates score after each Gomez goal.

List of international goals scored by James Gomez
No.	Date	Venue	Opponent	Score	Result	Competition	Ref.
1	8 June 2021	Arslan Zeki Demirci Sports Complex, Antalya, Turkey	Togo	1–0	1–0	Friendly	

== Honours ==
OB

- Danish 1st Division: 2024–25
