= Abdoulaye Wade Stadium =

Stadium in Diamniadio, Dakar, Senegal

- Interactive map of Abdoulaye Wade Stadium
- Full name: Stade Abdoulaye Wade
- Location: Diamniadio, Dakar, Senegal
- Coordinates: 14°43′57″N 17°12′04″W
- Owner: Government of Senegal
- Capacity: 50,000
- Surface: GrassMaster
- Field size: 105m x 68m

Construction
- Groundbreaking: 20 February 2020; 6 years ago
- Built: 2020–2022
- Opened: February 2022; 4 years ago
- Cost: €238 millions (estimated)
- Architect: Tabanlıoğlu Architects
- Main contractor: Summa

Tenant
- Senegal national football team (2022–present)

The Abdoulaye Wade Stadium, is a multi-purpose stadium. It can host association football, rugby and athletics in Diamniadio, Dakar, Senegal. It is the national stadium of the Senegal national football team. The stadium which has a capacity of 50,000 designed by Tabanlıoğlu Architects and built by Summa. It will host archery along with the opening and closing ceremonies for the 2026 Summer Youth Olympics.

== Design ==
=== Design ===
The stadium was designed by the Turkish architectural office Tabanlıoğlu Architects.

=== Construction ===
The stadium was built in 18 months by the Turkish construction company Summa. The construction covered an area of 88,000 square metres (22 acres). The contract type was a design–build turnkey project.

=== Cost ===
The cost of the construction was reported to be 156 billion CFA francs ($270 million).

== History ==
=== Inaugural match ===
The stadium was officially inaugurated by Senegalese President Macky Sall, in the presence of Turkish President Recep Tayyip Erdogan, FIFA President Gianni Infantino, Guinea-Bissau President Umaro Sissoco Embaló, Rwandan President Paul Kagame, Liberian President George Weah and Gambian President Adama Barrow.

The first match was a game between a selection from various generations of the Senegal national football team against a selection of African football legends. The Senegalese team composed of player such as El Hadj Diouf, Boubacar Sarr, Demba Ba, Mamadou Niang, Moussa Sow, Lamine Diatta, Omar Daf, Khalilou Fadiga, Oumar Sène, Thierno Youm, Racine Kane and Souleymane Sané. The other team consisted of players such as Samuel Eto'o, Didier Drogba, Yaya Touré, Emmanuel Adebayor, Jay-Jay Okocha, Asamoah Gyan, Patrick Mboma, Moustapha Hadji, Samuel Kuffour, Shabani Nonda and Jonathan Pitroipa. The match ended in a 1–1 draw.

The rest of the ceremony was marked by cultural and musical performances by stars of Senegalese music, Ismaël Lô, Baaba Maal and Youssou N'Dour.
