= Charles Konan Banny Stadium =

Stadium in Yamoussoukro, Ivory Coast

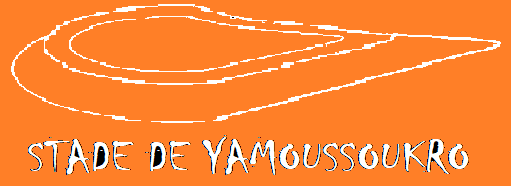

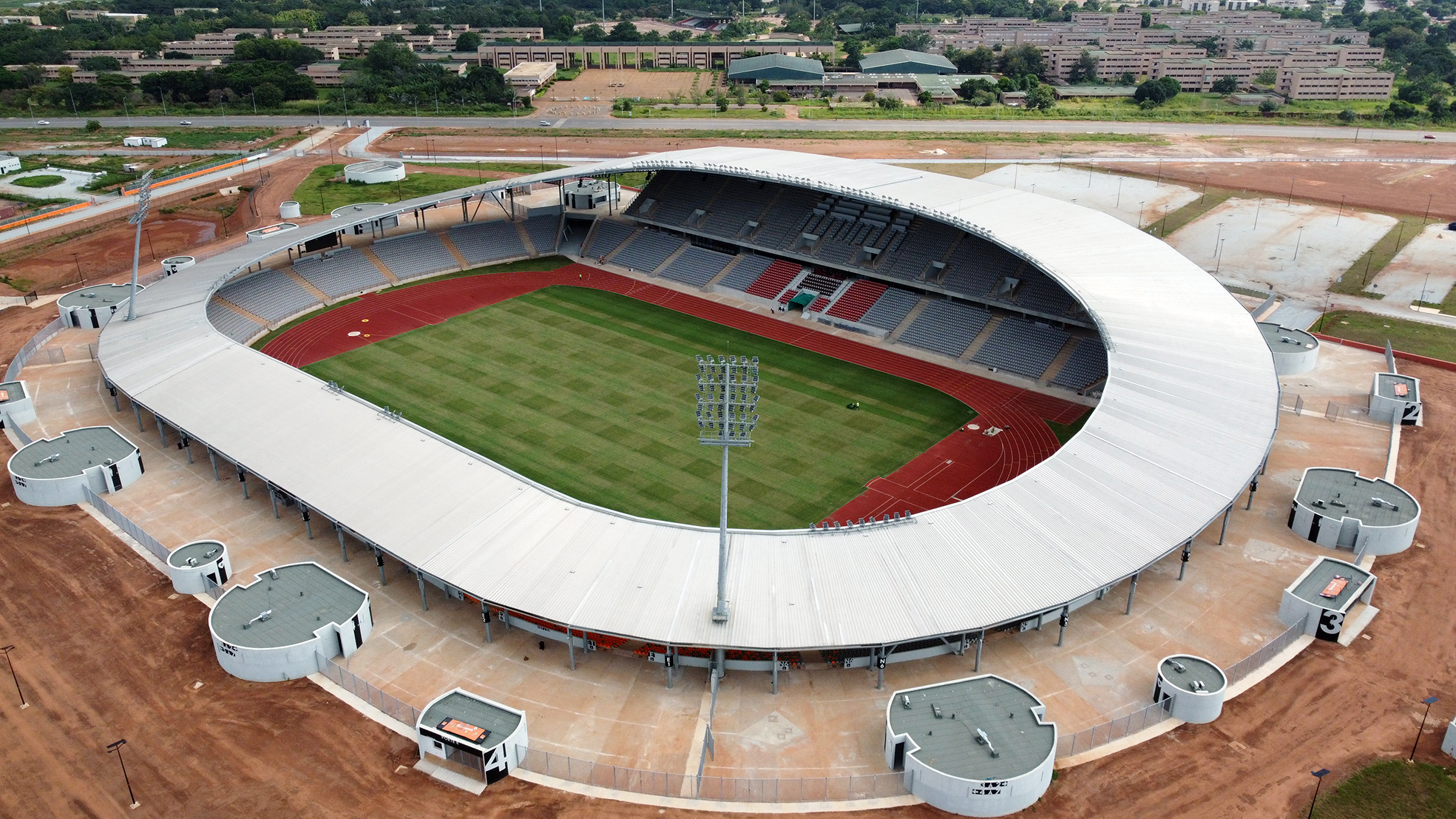
- Interactive map of Charles Konan Banny Stadium
- Location: Yamoussoukro, Ivory Coast
- Coordinates: 6°49′43″N 5°14′47″W
- Owner: Government of Ivory Coast
- Operator: Département de Yamoussoukro
- Capacity: 20,000
- Surface: GrassMaster
- Field size: 105m x 68m

Construction
- Groundbreaking: 19 October 2018
- Built: 11 June 2021
- Opened: 3 June 2022
- Cost: XOF 47 billion ($76 million)
- Architect: SCAU Architectes
- General contractor: Sogea Atom
- Main contractor: Vinci SA

Tenants
- SOA (2023–present); Ivory Coast national football team (selected matches)

Charles Konan Banny Stadium (French: Stade Charles Konan Banny) is a football stadium in Yamoussoukro, Ivory Coast, that was inaugurated on 3 June 2022. This was the fourth among the six stadiums for the 2023 Africa Cup of Nations in Ivory Coast. It was designed by an association formed of Alcor, Sogea-Satom, Egis and Baudin Chateauneuf.

== History ==
On 19 October 2018, the stadium was broke ground by Ivorian Prime Minister Amadou Gon Coulibaly. In anticipation of the 2021 Africa Cup of Nations, But On 30 November 2018, CAF stripped Cameroon of hosting the 2019 Africa Cup of Nations because of delays in the construction of stadiums and other necessary infrastructure; it was relocated to Egypt. CAF President at the time, Ahmad Ahmad, said that Cameroon had agreed to host the 2021 tournament instead. Consequently, Ivory Coast, original hosts of 2021, will host the 2023 Africa Cup of Nations. On 30 January 2019, the CAF President confirmed the timetable shift, after a meeting with Ivory Coast President, Alassane Ouattara, in Abidjan, Ivory Coast. Which gave the government more time to improve and test the state of the stadium, On 11 June 2021, the Stadium was handed over to the Yamoussoukro Municipality and will host Ligue 1 games. like SO de l'Armée team who plays its matches on this stadium The stadium is expected to host many matches of the 2023 Africa Cup of Nations next to other five stadiums are all appointed to host this competition.

=== Construction ===
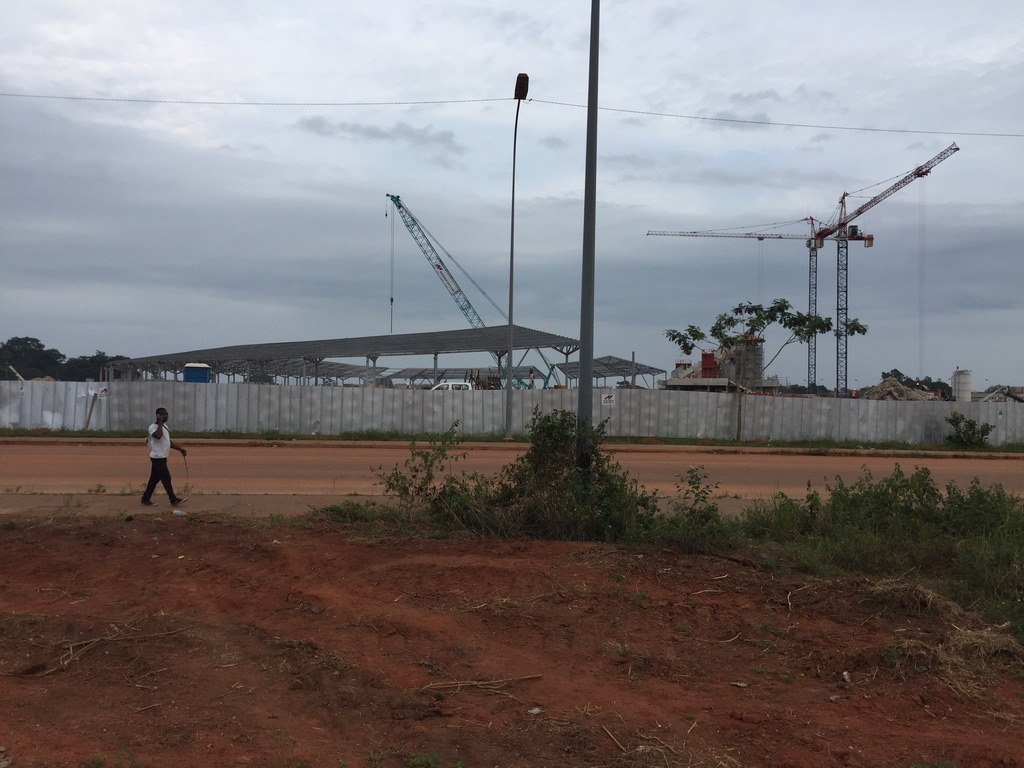
Stadium of Yamoussoukro in Construction, August 11, 2020

SCAU architecture, in partnership with Sogea Satom, Alcor, Baudin Chateauneuf, and Egis, oversaw the design and construction for the Charles Konan Banny Stadium. SCAU combined monumental and minimalist design elements in an effort to impart a sense of grandeur while also ensuring the construction of a cost-effective, enduring facility. The Ivory Coast has grappled with the issue of inadequate stadium maintenance, making longevity and budget-friendliness paramount concerns.

The western stand serves as the nucleus of the stadium's amenities, while the remaining three stands are nestled into the natural slope of the site, reducing the need for excessive structural maintenance. This design also enhances the experience of arriving at a match, as spectators ascend to the highest point of the stands, commanding a panoramic view of the entire stadium before descending to their seats, drawing closer to the pitch. A sweeping roof spans all stands, adapting its height to accommodate the spaces beneath while drawing attention towards the action on the field. Floodlight lamps are affixed to the roof in the west, while two independent masts are attached on the eastern side. Catering facilities and restrooms are located in the public concourse. As is customary with SCAU's stadium designs, meticulous consideration was given to the stadium's post-event life. Recognizing that a stadium's heritage is pivotal to its sustainability and upkeep, SCAU collaborated with local sports and educational organizations to envision how these spaces might be utilized on a daily basis after the conclusion of the African Cup. Despite the spread COVID-19 pandemic in Africa, efforts were made to continue the construction of the stadium. The construction was completed in summer 2021.

=== Handover and opening ===
Stadium from outside grounds

The inauguration was supposed to be held in September 2021. However the Confederation of African Football found some shortcomings about the stadium, mainly in terms of security, and the matches involving the Ivory Coast national football team had to be moved elsewhere. The stadium was inaugurated on 3 June 2022, during the 2023 Africa Cup of Nations qualification and the match between Ivory Coast and Zambia. Ivory Coast won 3–1. the Stadium was named after the processor of President Alassane Ouattara former president Charles Konan Banny who served as prime minister from 7 December 2005 until 4 April 2007, who died from COVID-19, during the COVID-19 pandemic in France, following his evacuation from the Ivory Coast. He was 78.

=== 2023 Africa Cup of Nations ===
The stadium was one of the venues for the 2023 Africa Cup of Nations.

The following matches were played at the stadium:

Date	Time (GMT)	Team #1	Result	Team #2	Round	Spectators
15 January 2024	14:00	Senegal	3–0	Gambia	Group C	7,896
15 January 2024	17:00	Cameroon	1–1	Guinea	Group C	11,271
19 January 2024	17:00	Senegal	3–1	Cameroon	Group C	19,176
19 January 2024	20:00	Guinea	1–0	Gambia	Group C	19,822
23 January 2024	17:00	Guinea	0–2	Senegal	Group C	15,753
23 January 2024	20:00	Angola	2–0	Burkina Faso	Group D	15,753
29 January 2024	20:00	Senegal	1–1 (a.e.t.) (4–5 p)	Ivory Coast	Round of 16	19,948
3 February 2024	20:00	Cape Verde	0–0 (a.e.t.) (1–2 p)	South Africa	Quarter-finals	12,162

== See also ==
- List of football stadiums in Ivory Coast
- List of African stadiums by capacity
- List of association football stadiums by capacity
