= List of Africa Cup of Nations penalty shoot-outs =

This is a list of all penalty shoot-outs that have occurred in the Finals tournament of the Africa Cup of Nations.

== Complete list ==
Key

- (penalty scored) = scored penalty
- (penalty missed) = missed penalty
- golden background = scored penalty which ended the shoot-out
- red background = missed penalty which ended the shoot-out
- grey background = first penalty in the shoot-out
- horizontal line within a list of takers = beginning of the sudden death stage

Penalty shoot-outs in the Africa Cup of Nations
| No. | Year | Round | Winner | F | Loser | Penalties | | | Winning team | | Losing team | | Date | Venue | |
| No. | Year | Round | Winner | F | Loser | S | M | T | GK | Takers | Takers | GK | Date | City | Stadium |
|---|---|---|---|---|---|---|---|---|---|---|---|---|---|---|---|
| | 2004, Tunisia | Semi-finals | | | | | | | | | | | | | |
| | 2006, Egypt | Quarter-finals | | | | | | | | | | | | | |
| | 2006, Egypt | Final | | | | | | | | | | | | | |
| | 2010, Angola | Quarter-finals | | | | | | | | | | | | | |
| | 2012, Equatorial Guinea / Gabon | Quarter-finals | | | | | | | | | | | | | |
| | 2012, Equatorial Guinea / Gabon | Final | | | | | | | | | | | | | |
| | 2013, South Africa | Quarter-finals | Mali | 1-1 | South Africa | 3–1 | 0–3 | 3–4 | Diakité | Diabaté (penalty scored); Tamboura (penalty scored); Ma. Traoré (penalty scored) | (penalty scored) Tshabalala; (penalty missed) Furman; (penalty missed) Mahlangu; (penalty missed) Majoro | Khune | 2 February 2013 | Moses Mabhida | Durban |
| | 2013, South Africa | Semi-finals | Burkina Faso | 1-1 | Ghana | 3–2 | 1–3 | 4–5 | Diakité | B. Koné (penalty scored); H. Traoré (penalty scored); Paul Koulibaly (penalty missed); Bancé (penalty scored) | (penalty missed) Vorsah; (penalty scored) Atsu; (penalty scored) Afful; (penalty missed) Clottey; (penalty missed) Agyemang-Badu | Dauda | 6 February 2013 | Mbombela | Nelspruit |
| | 2015, Equatorial Guinea | Third place play-off | DR Congo | 0-0 | Equatorial Guinea | 4–2 | 0–2 | 4–4 | Kidiaba | Mabwati (penalty scored); Mabidi (penalty scored); Mbemba (penalty scored); Mongongu (penalty scored) | (penalty missed) Balboa; (penalty missed) Fabiani; (penalty scored) Juvenal; (penalty scored) Ellong | Onovo | 7 February 2015 | Estadio de Malabo | Malabo |
| | 2015, Equatorial Guinea | Final | Ivory Coast | 0-0 | Ghana | 8–8 | 2–3 | 11–11 | Barry | Bony (penalty missed); Gadji (penalty missed); Aurier (penalty scored); Doumbia (penalty scored); Y. Touré (penalty scored) Kalou (penalty scored); K. Touré (penalty scored); Kanon (penalty scored); Bailly (penalty scored); Dié (penalty scored); Barry (penalty scored) | (penalty scored) Wakaso; (penalty scored) J. Ayew; (penalty missed) Acquah; (penalty missed) Acheampong; (penalty scored) A. Ayew (penalty scored) Mensah; (penalty scored) Badu; (penalty scored) Afful; (penalty scored) Rahman; (penalty scored) Boye; (penalty missed) Razak | Razak | 8 February 2015 | Estadio de Bata | Bata |
| | 2017, Gabon | Quarter-finals | Cameroon | 0–0 | Senegal | 5–4 | 0–1 | 5–5 | Ondoa | Moukandjo (penalty scored); Oyongo (penalty scored); Teikeu (penalty scored); Zoua (penalty scored); Aboubakar (penalty scored) | (penalty scored) Koulibaly; (penalty scored) Mbodji; (penalty scored) Sow; (penalty scored) Saivet; (penalty missed) Mané | Diallo | 28 January 2017 | Stade de Franceville | Franceville |
| | 2017, Gabon | Semi-finals | Burkina Faso | 1–1 | Egypt | 4–3 | 1–2 | 5–5 | El-Hadary | Said (penalty missed); Sobhi (penalty scored); Hegazy (penalty scored); M. Salah (penalty scored); Warda | (penalty scored) Al. Traoré; (penalty scored) Diawara; (penalty scored) Yago; (penalty missed) Koffi; (penalty missed) B. Traoré (penalty missed) | Koffi | 1 February 2017 | Stade de l'Amitié | Libreville |
| | 2019, Egypt | Round of 16 | Benin | 1–1 | Morocco | 4–1 | 0–2 | 4–3 | Allagbé | Verdon (penalty scored); Djigla (penalty scored); Anaane (penalty scored); Séïbou (penalty scored) | (penalty scored) Idrissi; (penalty missed) Boufal; (penalty missed) En-Nesyri | Bounou | 5 July 2019 | Al Salam | Cairo |
| | 2019, Egypt | Round of 16 | Madagascar | 2–2 | DR Congo | 4–2 | 0–2 | 4–4 | Adrien | Amada (penalty scored); Métanire (penalty scored); Fontaine (penalty scored); Mombris (penalty scored) | (penalty missed) Tisserand; (penalty scored) Bakambu; (penalty scored) M'Poku; (penalty missed) Bolasie | Matampi | 7 July 2019 | Alexandria | Alexandria |
| | 2019, Egypt | Round of 16 | Tunisia | 1–1 | Ghana | 5–4 | 0–1 | 5–5 | Ofori | Sliti (penalty scored); Khazri (penalty scored); Bronn (penalty scored); Meriah (penalty scored); Sassi (penalty scored) | (penalty scored) Wakaso; (penalty scored) J. Ayew; (penalty missed) Ekuban; (penalty scored) Agbenyenu; (penalty scored) Partey | Ben Mustapha | 8 July 2019 | Ismailia | Ismailia |
| | 2019, Egypt | Quarter-finals | Algeria | 1-1 | Ivory Coast | 5–4 | 0–1 | 5–5 | M'Bolhi | Bensebaini (penalty scored); Slimani (penalty scored); Delort (penalty scored); Ounas (penalty scored); Belaïli (penalty missed) | (penalty scored) Kessié; (penalty scored) Cornet; (penalty missed) Bony; (penalty scored) Gradel; (penalty missed) Dié | Gbohouo | 11 July 2019 | Suez | Suez |
| | 2021, Cameroon | Round of 16 | Burkina Faso | 1–1 | Gabon | 7–6 | 2–3 | 9–9 | Koffi | Kaboré (penalty scored); S. Ouattara (penalty scored); E. Tapsoba (penalty scored); Simporé (penalty missed); Yago (penalty scored) Guira (penalty scored); Konaté (penalty scored); A. Tapsoba (penalty missed); I. Ouédraogo (penalty scored) | (penalty scored) Bouanga; (penalty scored) Méyé; (penalty scored) Boupendza; (penalty missed) Kanga; (penalty scored) Biyogo Poko (penalty scored) Ecuele Manga; (penalty scored) Ameka; (penalty missed) N'Gakoutou; (penalty missed) Palun | Amonome | 23 January 2022 | Limbe | Limbe |
| | 2021, Cameroon | Round of 16 | Egypt | 0–0 | Ivory Coast | 5–4 | 0–1 | 5–5 | Abou Gabal | Zizo (penalty scored); El Solia (penalty scored); Kamal (penalty scored); Abdelmonem (penalty scored); Salah (penalty scored) | (penalty scored) Pépé; (penalty scored) I. Sangaré; (penalty missed) Bailly; (penalty scored) Cornet; (penalty scored) Zaha | Ali Sangaré | 26 January 2022 | Japoma | Douala |
| | 2021, Cameroon | Round of 16 | Mali | 0–0 | Equatorial Guinea | 6–5 | 2–3 | 8–8 | Owono | E. Nsue (penalty missed); Belima (penalty scored); Akapo (penalty scored); Buyla (penalty scored); Ganet (penalty missed) Coco (penalty scored); Salvador (penalty scored); Eneme (penalty scored) | (penalty scored) A. N. Traoré; (penalty scored) Djenepo; (penalty missed) M. Haïdara; (penalty scored) Hama. Traoré; (penalty scored) Touré (penalty scored) Dieng; (penalty scored) Camara; (penalty missed) Sacko | Mounkoro | 26 January 2022 | Limbe | Limbe |
| | 2021, Cameroon | Semi-finals | Egypt | 0–0 | Cameroon | 3-1 | 0–3 | 3–4 | Abou Gabal | Zizo (penalty scored); Abdelmonem (penalty scored); Lasheen (penalty scored) | (penalty scored) Aboubakar; (penalty missed) Moukoudi; (penalty missed) Léa Siliki; (penalty missed) N'Jie | Onana | 3 February 2022 | Olembe | Yaoundé |
| | 2021, Cameroon | Third place play-off | Cameroon | 3–3 | Burkina Faso | 5-3 | 0–1 | 5–4 | Onana | Aboubakar (penalty scored); Ngamaleu (penalty scored); Toko Ekambi (penalty scored); Kunde (penalty scored); Oyongo (penalty scored) | (penalty scored) Kaboré; (penalty scored) S. Ouattara; (penalty missed) Touré; (penalty missed) Yago | Ouédraogo | 5 February 2022 | Ahmadou Ahidjo | Yaoundé |
| | 2021, Cameroon | Final | Senegal | 0-0 | Egypt | 4-2 | 1–2 | 5–4 | Mendy | Koulibaly (penalty scored); A. Diallo (penalty scored); B. Sarr (penalty missed); B. Dieng (penalty scored); Mané (penalty scored) | (penalty scored) Zizo; (penalty missed) Abdelmonem; (penalty scored) Mar. Hamdy; (penalty missed) Lasheen | Abou Gabal | 6 February 2022 | Olembe | Yaoundé |
| | 2023, Ivory Coast | Round of 16 | DR Congo | 1–1 | Egypt | 8–7 | 1–2 | 9–9 | Mpasi | Moutoussamy (penalty scored); Masuaku (penalty missed); Dianagana (penalty scored); Silas (penalty scored); Tshibola (penalty scored) Kalulu (penalty scored); Mbemba (penalty scored); Inonga Baka (penalty scored); Mpasi | (penalty scored) Abdelmonem; (penalty missed) Mohamed; (penalty scored) Marmoush; (penalty scored) Kamal; (penalty scored) Hany (penalty scored) Hegazi; (penalty scored) M. Fathi; (penalty scored) Hamada; (penalty missed) Abou Gabal | Abou Gabal | 28 January 2024 | Laurent Pokou | San Pédro |
| | 2023, Ivory Coast | Round of 16 | Ivory Coast | 1–1 | Senegal | 5–4 | 0–1 | 5–5 | Fofana | Pépé (penalty scored); Kouamé (penalty scored); Haller (penalty scored); Aurier (penalty scored); Kessié | (penalty scored) Koulibaly (penalty scored) P. Sarr; (penalty missed) Niakhaté; (penalty scored) Dieng; (penalty scored) Mané | Mendy | 29 January 2024 | Charles Konan Banny | Yamoussoukro |
| | 2023, Ivory Coast | Quarter-finals | South Africa | 0–0 | Cape Verde | 2–1 | 2–4 | 4–5 | Williams | Mokoena (penalty scored); Lepasa (penalty missed); Modiba (penalty missed); Mvala (penalty scored) | (penalty missed) Bebé; (penalty missed) Semedo; (penalty missed) L. Duarte; (penalty scored) Teixeira; (penalty missed) Andrade | Vozinha | 3 February 2024 | Charles Konan Banny | Yamoussoukro |
| | 2023, Ivory Coast | Semi-finals | Nigeria | 1–1 | South Africa | 4–2 | 1–2 | 5–4 | Nwabili | Moffi (penalty scored); Omeruo (penalty scored); Aina (penalty missed); Troost-Ekong (penalty scored); Iheanacho (penalty scored) | (penalty missed) Mokoena; (penalty scored) Mayambela; (penalty missed) Makgopa; (penalty scored) Mvala | Williams | 7 February 2024 | Stade de la Paix | Bouaké |
| | 2023, Ivory Coast | Third place play-off | South Africa | 0–0 | DR Congo | 6–5 | 1–2 | 7–7 | Williams | Mokoena (penalty missed); Sibisi (penalty scored); Monare (penalty scored); Modiba (penalty scored); Lepasa (penalty scored) Appollis (penalty scored); Xulu (penalty scored) | (penalty scored) Moutoussamy; (penalty scored) Mfulu; (penalty scored) Bakambu; (penalty scored) Kayembe; (penalty missed) Mbemba (penalty scored) Wissa; (penalty missed) Elia | Bertaud | 10 February 2024 | Felix Houphouet Boigny | Abidjan |
| | 2025, Morocco | Round of 16 | Mali | 1–1 | Tunisia | 3–2 | 2–3 | 5–5 | Diarra | Bissouma (penalty missed); Sinayoko (penalty scored); Dorgeles (penalty missed); Diakité (penalty scored); Touré (penalty scored) | (penalty scored) Meriah; (penalty missed) Abdi; (penalty scored) Saad; (penalty missed) Achouri; (penalty missed) Ben Romdhane | Dahmen | 3 January 2026 | Mohammed V | Casablanca |
| | 2025, Morocco | Semi-Finals | Morocco | 0–0 | Nigeria | 4–2 | 1–2 | 5–4 | Bounou | El Aynaoui (penalty scored); Igamane (penalty missed); Ben Seghir (penalty scored); Hakimi (penalty scored); En-Nesyri (penalty scored) | (penalty scored) Onuachu; (penalty missed) Chukwueze; (penalty scored) Dele-Bashiru; (penalty missed) Onyemaechi | Nwabali | 14 January 2026 | Prince Moulay Abdellah | Rabat |
| | 2025, Morocco | Third place play-off | Nigeria | 0–0 | Egypt | 4–2 | 1–2 | 5–4 | Nwabali | Dele-Bashiru (penalty missed); Adams (penalty scored); Simon (penalty scored); Iwobi (penalty scored); Lookman (penalty scored) | (penalty missed) Salah; (penalty missed) Marmoush; (penalty scored) Rabia; (penalty scored) Saber | Shobeir | 17 January 2026 | Mohammed V | Casablanca |
