= 2021 Africa Cup of Nations knockout stage =

Football tournament stage

The knockout stage of the 2021 Africa Cup of Nations was the second and final stage of the competition, following the group stage. It began on 23 January with the round of 16 and ended on 6 February 2022 with the final held at the Olembe Stadium in Yaoundé. A total of 16 teams (the top two teams from each group, along with the four best third-placed teams) advanced to the knockout stage to compete in a single-elimination style tournament.

All match times are local, WAT (UTC+1).

== Format ==
In the knockout stage, except for the third place play-off, if a match was level at the end of 90 minutes of normal playing time, extra time was played (two periods of 15 minutes each). If still tied after extra time, the match was decided by a penalty shoot-out to determine the winner. In the third place play-off, if the scores remained level after 90 minutes the match would go directly to a penalty shoot-out, without any extra time being played.

== Qualified teams ==
The top two placed teams from each of the six groups, plus the four best-placed third teams, qualified for the knockout stage.

Group	Winners	Runners-up	Third-placed teams (Best four qualified)
A	Cameroon	Burkina Faso	Cape Verde
B	Senegal	Guinea	Malawi
C	Morocco	Gabon	Comoros
D	Nigeria	Egypt	—N/a
E	Ivory Coast	Equatorial Guinea	—N/a
F	Mali	Gambia	Tunisia

== Bracket ==
Round of 16
23 January – Limbe
Burkina Faso (p)	1 (7)
Gabon	1 (6)
23 January – Garoua
Nigeria	0
Tunisia	1
25 January – Bafoussam
Senegal	2
Cape Verde	0
26 January – Limbe
Mali	0 (5)
Equatorial Guinea (p)	0 (6)
24 January – Bafoussam
Guinea	0
Gambia	1
24 January – Yaoundé (Olembe)
Cameroon	2
Comoros	1
26 January – Douala
Ivory Coast	0 (4)
Egypt (p)	0 (5)
25 January – Yaoundé (Ahidjo)
Morocco	2
Malawi	1

Quarter-finals
29 January – Garoua
Burkina Faso	1
Tunisia	0
30 January – Yaoundé (Ahidjo)
Senegal	3
Equatorial Guinea	1
29 January – Douala
Gambia	0
Cameroon	2
30 January – Yaoundé (Ahidjo)
Egypt (a.e.t.)	2
Morocco	1

Semi-finals
2 February – Yaoundé (Ahidjo)
Burkina Faso	1
Senegal	3
3 February – Yaoundé (Olembe)
Cameroon	0 (1)
Egypt (p)	0 (3)

Final
6 February – Yaoundé (Olembe)
Senegal (p)	0 (4)
Egypt	0 (2)
Third place play-off
5 February – Yaoundé (Ahidjo)
Burkina Faso	3 (3)
Cameroon (p)	3 (5)

== Round of 16 ==
=== Burkina Faso vs Gabon ===
23 January 2022
17:00

Burkina Faso	1–1 (a.e.t.)	Gabon
B. Traoré 28'	Report	Guira 90+1' (o.g.)
Penalties
Kaboré (penalty scored); S. Ouattara (penalty scored); E. Tapsoba (penalty scored); Simporé (penalty missed); Yago (penalty scored); Guira (penalty scored); Konaté (penalty scored); A. Tapsoba (penalty missed); I. Ouédraogo (penalty scored)	7–6	(penalty scored) Bouanga; (penalty scored) Méyé; (penalty scored) Boupendza; (penalty missed) Kanga; (penalty scored) Biyogo Poko; (penalty scored) Ecuele Manga; (penalty scored) Ameka; (penalty missed) N'Gakoutou; (penalty missed) Palun

Limbe Stadium, Limbe
Referee: Redouane Jiyed (Morocco)

Burkina Faso	Gabon

GK	16	Hervé Koffi
RB	9	Issa Kaboré	(yellow card) 70'
CB	4	Soumaïla Ouattara
CB	12	Edmond Tapsoba
LB	25	Steeve Yago
CM	24	Adama Guira	(yellow card) 9'
CM	22	Blati Touré	(yellow card) 22'	(substituted off) 114'
RW	28	Dango Ouattara		(substituted off) 89'
AM	20	Gustavo Sangaré		(substituted off) 82'
LW	19	Hassane Bandé		(substituted off) 73'
CF	10	Bertrand Traoré (c)		(substituted off) 81'
Substitutions:
FW	17	Zakaria Sanogo		(substituted on) 73'
FW	11	Mohamed Konaté	(yellow card) 90'	(substituted on) 81'
MF	6	Saïdou Simporé	(yellow card) 88'	(substituted on) 82'
FW	15	Abdoul Tapsoba	(yellow card) 102'	(substituted on) 89'
MF	18	Ismahila Ouédraogo		(substituted on) 114'
Manager:
Kamou Malo

GK	1	Jean-Noël Amonome	(yellow card) PSO
CB	8	Lloyd Palun
CB	5	Bruno Ecuele Manga (c)	(yellow card) 67'
CB	4	Sidney Obissa	(yellow card) 16' (yellow-red card) 67'
RM	3	Anthony Oyono		(substituted off) 50'
CM	2	Alex Moucketou-Moussounda		(substituted off) 46'
CM	17	André Biyogo Poko	(yellow card) 58'
LM	6	Johann Obiang		(substituted off) 85'
AM	12	Guélor Kanga
CF	7	Aaron Boupendza	(yellow card) 18'
CF	11	Jim Allevinah	(yellow card) 7'	(substituted off) 50'
Substitutions:
FW	14	Louis Ameka		(substituted on) 46'
FW	20	Denis Bouanga	(yellow card) 68'	(substituted on) 50'
FW	10	Axel Méyé		(substituted on) 50'
DF	28	Yannis N'Gakoutou		(substituted on) 85'
Other disciplinary actions:
GK	16	Anthony Mfa Mezui	(yellow card) 103'
Manager:
(France) Patrice Neveu

Man of the Match:
Blati Touré (Burkina Faso)

Assistant referees:
Lahcen Azgaou (Morocco)
Mustapha Akarkad (Morocco)
Fourth official:
Ahmad Heeralall (Mauritius)
Video assistant referee:
Adil Zourak (Morocco)
Assistant video assistant referees:
Bouchra Karboubi (Morocco)
Zakaria Brinsi (Morocco)

=== Nigeria vs Tunisia ===
23 January 2022
20:00

Nigeria	0–1	Tunisia
	Report	Msakni 47'

Roumdé Adjia Stadium, Garoua
Referee: Maguette N'Diaye (Senegal)

Nigeria	Tunisia

GK	1	Maduka Okoye
RB	2	Ola Aina
CB	5	William Troost-Ekong (c)
CB	22	Kenneth Omeruo
LB	12	Zaidu Sanusi
CM	4	Wilfred Ndidi
CM	10	Joe Aribo		(substituted off) 88'
RW	17	Samuel Chukwueze		(substituted off) 75'
AM	14	Kelechi Iheanacho	(yellow card) 20'	(substituted off) 59'
LW	15	Moses Simon
CF	19	Taiwo Awoniyi		(substituted off) 60'
Substitutions:
MF	18	Alex Iwobi	(red card) 66'	(substituted on) 59'
FW	28	Peter Olayinka		(substituted on) 60'
FW	24	Umar Sadiq		(substituted on) 75'
FW	7	Ahmed Musa		(substituted on) 88'
Interim manager:
Augustine Eguavoen

GK	22	Bechir Ben Saïd
RB	20	Mohamed Dräger
CB	2	Bilel Ifa
CB	3	Montassar Talbi
LB	5	Oussama Haddadi
CM	25	Anis Ben Slimane		(substituted off) 90+4'
CM	17	Ellyes Skhiri
CM	28	Aïssa Laïdouni	(yellow card) 53'
RF	19	Hamza Rafia		(substituted off) 69'
CF	11	Seifeddine Jaziri		(substituted off) 86'
LF	7	Youssef Msakni (c)		(substituted off) 86'
Substitutions:
FW	23	Naïm Sliti		(substituted on) 69'
FW	27	Issam Jebali		(substituted on) 86'
FW	10	Wahbi Khazri		(substituted on) 86'
DF	4	Omar Rekik		(substituted on) 90+4'
Assistant manager:
Jalel Kadri

Man of the Match:
Youssef Msakni (Tunisia)

Assistant referees:
El Hadj Malick Samba (Senegal)
Djibril Camara (Senegal)
Fourth official:
Issa Sy (Senegal)
Video assistant referee:
Fernando Guerrero (Mexico)
Assistant video assistant referees:
Dahane Beida (Mauritania)
Fatiha Jermoumi (Morocco)

=== Guinea vs Gambia ===
24 January 2022
17:00

Guinea	0–1	Gambia
	Report	Mu. Barrow 71'

Kouekong Stadium, Bafoussam
Referee: Amin Omar (Egypt)

Guinea	Gambia

GK	1	Aly Keita
CB	5	Saïdou Sow
CB	13	Mohamed Ali Camara
CB	4	Ibrahima Conté II	(yellow card) 81' (yellow-red card) 90+3'
DM	6	Amadou Diawara (c)
RM	7	Ibrahima Cissé
CM	23	Aguibou Camara		(substituted off) 76'
CM	14	Ilaix Moriba
LM	20	Pa Konate		(substituted off) 83'
CF	11	Mohamed Bayo		(substituted off) 83'
CF	9	José Kanté
Substitutions:
MF	2	Morlaye Sylla		(substituted on) 76'
FW	21	Sory Kaba		(substituted on) 83'
FW	10	Morgan Guilavogui		(substituted on) 83'
Manager:
(France) Kaba Diawara

GK	18	Baboucarr Gaye
RB	12	James Gomez
CB	5	Omar Colley
CB	6	Sulayman Marreh
LB	13	Pa Modou Jagne (c)
DM	4	Dawda Ngum
DM	8	Ebrima Darboe		(substituted off) 72'
CM	2	Yusupha Bobb	(yellow card) 27'	(substituted off) 90+1'
RF	3	Ablie Jallow		(substituted off) 63'
CF	10	Musa Barrow
LF	11	Modou Barrow		(substituted off) 72'
Substitutions:
FW	19	Ebrima Colley		(substituted on) 63'
FW	9	Assan Ceesay		(substituted on) 72'
FW	27	Yusupha Njie	(yellow card) 74' (yellow-red card) 87'	(substituted on) 72'
DF	16	Mohammed Mbye		(substituted on) 90+1'
Manager:
(Belgium) Tom Saintfiet

Man of the Match:
Musa Barrow (Gambia)

Assistant referees:
Mahmoud Ahmed Abouelregal (Egypt)
Ahmed Hossam Taha (Egypt)
Fourth official:
Mohamed Marouf Eid Mansour (Egypt)
Video assistant referee:
Mahmoud Mohamed Ashour (Egypt)
Assistant video assistant referees:
Ahmed El Ghandour (Egypt)
Mohammed Abdallah Ibrahim (Sudan)

=== Cameroon vs Comoros ===
24 January 2022
20:00

Cameroon	2–1	Comoros
Toko Ekambi 29'; Aboubakar 70'	Report	Y. M'Changama 81'

Olembe Stadium, Yaoundé
Referee: Bamlak Tessema Weyesa (Ethiopia)

Cameroon	Comoros

GK	24	André Onana
RB	19	Collins Fai
CB	21	Jean-Charles Castelletto
CB	5	Michael Ngadeu-Ngadjui
LB	25	Nouhou Tolo
RM	3	Moumi Ngamaleu		(substituted off) 63'
CM	18	Martin Hongla	(yellow card) 80'
CM	8	André-Frank Zambo Anguissa	(yellow card) 33'	(substituted off) 84'
LM	12	Karl Toko Ekambi		(substituted off) 77'
CF	13	Eric Maxim Choupo-Moting		(substituted off) 63'
CF	10	Vincent Aboubakar (c)		(substituted off) 77'
Substitutions:
FW	7	Clinton N'Jie		(substituted on) 63'
FW	11	Christian Bassogog		(substituted on) 63'
MF	27	James Léa Siliki		(substituted on) 77'
FW	9	Stéphane Bahoken		(substituted on) 77'
MF	26	Jean Onana		(substituted on) 84'
Manager:
(Portugal) Toni Conceição

GK	3	Chaker Alhadhur
RB	19	Mohamed Youssouf		(substituted off) 89'
CB	4	Younn Zahary
CB	6	Jimmy Abdou (c)	(red card) 7'
LB	22	Saïd Bakari		(substituted off) 88'
CM	8	Fouad Bachirou	(yellow card) 82'	(substituted off) 88'
CM	13	Rafidine Abdullah
RW	15	Benjaloud Youssouf		(substituted off) 75'
AM	10	Youssouf M'Changama
LW	20	Ahmed Mogni		(substituted off) 52'
CF	21	Ben Nabouhane
Substitutions:
DF	5	Abdallah Ali Mohamed		(substituted on) 52'
FW	24	Faiz Mattoir	(yellow card) 87'	(substituted on) 75'
FW	14	Ali M'Madi		(substituted on) 88'
FW	25	Moussa Djoumoi		(substituted on) 88'
FW	17	Ibroihim Djoudja		(substituted on) 89'
Manager:
(France) Amir Abdou

Man of the Match:
Youssouf M'Changama (Comoros)

Assistant referees:
Arsenio Marengula (Mozambique)
Gilbert Cheruiyot (Kenya)
Fourth official:
Bernard Camille (Seychelles)
Video assistant referee:
Maguette N'Diaye (Senegal)
Assistant video assistant referees:
Peter Waweru (Kenya)
Jerson Emiliano dos Santos (Angola)

=== Senegal vs Cape Verde ===
25 January 2022
17:00

Senegal	2–0	Cape Verde
Mané 63'; B. Dieng 90+2'	Report

Kouekong Stadium, Bafoussam
Referee: Lahlou Benbraham (Algeria)

Senegal	Cape Verde

GK	16	Édouard Mendy
RB	20	Bouna Sarr
CB	3	Kalidou Koulibaly (c)
CB	22	Abdou Diallo
LB	2	Saliou Ciss		(substituted off) 82'
CM	5	Idrissa Gueye
CM	6	Nampalys Mendy	(yellow card) 72'
CM	26	Pape Gueye		(substituted off) 82'
RF	9	Boulaye Dia
CF	19	Famara Diédhiou
LF	10	Sadio Mané		(substituted off) 70'
Substitutions:
FW	15	Bamba Dieng		(substituted on) 70'
MF	13	Joseph Lopy		(substituted on) 82'
DF	12	Fodé Ballo-Touré		(substituted on) 82'	(substituted off) 90'
DF	21	Ibrahima Mbaye			(substituted on) 90'
Manager:
Aliou Cissé

GK	1	Vozinha	(red card) 57'
CB	17	Steven Fortès
CB	4	Pico		(substituted off) 46'
CB	2	Stopira (c)
RM	22	Jeffry Fortes
CM	7	Patrick Andrade	(red card) 21'
CM	18	Kenny Rocha		(substituted off) 75'
LM	16	Dylan Tavares		(substituted off) 69'
RF	11	Garry Rodrigues		(substituted off) 59'
CF	20	Ryan Mendes		(substituted off) 75'
LF	10	Jamiro Monteiro
Substitutions:
DF	3	Diney		(substituted on) 46'
GK	12	Márcio Rosa		(substituted on) 59'
MF	5	Nuno Borges		(substituted on) 69'
FW	19	Júlio Tavares		(substituted on) 75'
FW	8	Lisandro Semedo		(substituted on) 75'
Manager:
Bubista

Man of the Match:
Bamba Dieng (Senegal)

Assistant referees:
James Fredrick Emile (Seychelles)
Mahamadou Yahaya (Niger)
Fourth official:
Daniel Nii Laryea (Ghana)
Video assistant referee:
Mehdi Abid Charef (Algeria)
Assistant video assistant referees:
Mahmoud El Banna (Egypt)
Khalil Hassani (Tunisia)

=== Morocco vs Malawi ===
25 January 2022
20:00

Morocco	2–1	Malawi
En-Nesyri 45+2'; Hakimi 70'	Report	Mhango 7'

Ahmadou Ahidjo Stadium, Yaoundé
Referee: Pacifique Ndabihawenimana (Burundi)

Morocco	Malawi

GK	1	Yassine Bounou
RB	2	Achraf Hakimi
CB	6	Romain Saïss (c)
CB	5	Nayef Aguerd
LB	3	Adam Masina
RM	7	Imran Louza	(substituted off) 80'
CM	15	Selim Amallah
CM	4	Sofyan Amrabat
LM	17	Sofiane Boufal	(substituted off) 81'
CF	19	Youssef En-Nesyri	(substituted off) 88'
CF	9	Ayoub El Kaabi	(substituted off) 53'
Substitutions:
FW	23	Ryan Mmaee	(substituted on) 53'
MF	16	Aymen Barkok	(substituted on) 80'
FW	10	Munir El Haddadi	(substituted on) 81'
FW	14	Zakaria Aboukhlal	(substituted on) 88'
Manager:
(Bosnia and Herzegovina) Vahid Halilhodžić

GK	1	Charles Thomu
RB	2	Stanley Sanudi	(yellow card) 60'	(substituted off) 79'
CB	15	Lawrence Chaziya
CB	5	Dennis Chembezi
LB	21	Gomezgani Chirwa
RM	7	Micium Mhone		(substituted off) 45+4'
CM	8	Chimwemwe Idana		(substituted off) 80'
CM	17	John Banda (c)
LM	10	Francisco Madinga	(yellow card) 33'	(substituted off) 78'
CF	22	Khuda Muyaba		(substituted off) 46'
CF	11	Gabadinho Mhango	(yellow card) 69'
Substitutions:
MF	27	Gerald Phiri Jr.		(substituted on) 45+4'
FW	9	Richard Mbulu		(substituted on) 46'
DF	12	Mark Fodya		(substituted on) 78'
FW	26	Stain Davie		(substituted on) 79'
FW	14	Robin Ngalande		(substituted on) 80'
Manager:
(Romania) Mario Marinică

Man of the Match:
Achraf Hakimi (Morocco)

Assistant referees:
Elvis Guy Noupue Nguegoue (Cameroon)
Seydou Tiama (Burkina Faso)
Fourth official:
Boubou Traore (Mali)
Video assistant referee:
Haythem Guirat (Tunisia)
Assistant video assistant referees:
Peter Waweru (Kenya)
Djibril Camara (Senegal)

=== Ivory Coast vs Egypt ===
26 January 2022
17:00

Ivory Coast	0–0 (a.e.t.)	Egypt
	Report
Penalties
Pépé (penalty scored); I. Sangaré (penalty scored); Bailly (penalty missed); Cornet (penalty scored); Zaha (penalty scored)	4–5	(penalty scored) Zizo; (penalty scored) El Solia; (penalty scored) Kamal; (penalty scored) Abdelmonem; (penalty scored) Salah

Japoma Stadium, Douala
Referee: Jean-Jacques Ndala (DR Congo)

Ivory Coast	Egypt

GK	23	Badra Ali Sangaré
RB	17	Serge Aurier (c)
CB	21	Eric Bailly	(yellow card) 9'
CB	14	Simon Deli	(yellow card) 112'
LB	3	Ghislain Konan
CM	18	Ibrahim Sangaré
CM	4	Jean Michaël Seri		(substituted off) 72'
CM	8	Franck Kessié		(substituted off) 30'
RF	15	Max Gradel		(substituted off) 71'
CF	22	Sébastien Haller		(substituted off) 105'
LF	19	Nicolas Pépé
Substitutions:
MF	20	Serey Dié		(substituted on) 30'
FW	9	Wilfried Zaha	(yellow card) 118'	(substituted on) 71'
FW	13	Jérémie Boga		(substituted on) 72'
MF	11	Maxwel Cornet		(substituted on) 105'
Manager:
(France) Patrice Beaumelle

GK	1	Mohamed El Shenawy		(substituted off) 88'
RB	3	Omar Kamal
CB	6	Ahmed Hegazi
CB	2	Mohamed Abdelmonem
LB	13	Ahmed Fatouh
CM	17	Mohamed Elneny
CM	4	Amr El Solia
CM	5	Hamdy Fathy		(substituted off) 84'
RF	10	Mohamed Salah (c)
CF	14	Mostafa Mohamed		(substituted off) 91'
LF	22	Omar Marmoush		(substituted off) 71'
Substitutions:
FW	7	Trézéguet		(substituted on) 71'
MF	21	Zizo	(yellow card) 90+2'	(substituted on) 84'
GK	16	Mohamed Abou Gabal		(substituted on) 88'
FW	9	Mohamed Sherif		(substituted on) 91'
Manager:
(Portugal) Carlos Queiroz

Man of the Match:
Mohamed Elneny (Egypt)

Assistant referees:
Olivier Safari (DR Congo)
Soulaimane Amaldine (Comoros)
Fourth official:
Hélder Martins de Carvalho (Angola)
Video assistant referee:
Bamlak Tessema Weyesa (Ethiopia)
Assistant video assistant referees:
Fernando Guerrero (Mexico)
El Hadj Malick Samba (Senegal)

=== Mali vs Equatorial Guinea ===
26 January 2022
20:00

Mali	0–0 (a.e.t.)	Equatorial Guinea
	Report
Penalties
A. N. Traoré (penalty scored); Djenepo (penalty scored); M. Haïdara (penalty missed); Hama. Traoré (penalty missed); Touré (penalty scored); Dieng (penalty scored); Camara (penalty scored); Sacko (penalty missed)	5–6	(penalty missed) E. Nsue; (penalty scored) Belima; (penalty scored) Akapo; (penalty scored) Buyla; (penalty missed) Ganet; (penalty scored) Coco; (penalty scored) Salvador; (penalty scored) Eneme

Limbe Stadium, Limbe
Referee: Bakary Gassama (Gambia)

Mali	Equatorial Guinea

GK	1	Ibrahim Mounkoro
RB	2	Hamari Traoré (c)
CB	17	Falaye Sacko
CB	5	Boubakar Kouyaté
LB	6	Massadio Haïdara
CM	4	Amadou Haidara		(substituted off) 108'
CM	26	Mohamed Camara
RW	14	Adama Malouda Traoré		(substituted off) 70'
AM	20	Yves Bissouma		(substituted off) 70'
LW	7	Moussa Doumbia	(yellow card) 78'
CF	18	Ibrahima Koné		(substituted off) 84'
Substitutions:
MF	21	Adama Noss Traoré		(substituted on) 70'
MF	19	Moussa Djenepo		(substituted on) 70'
FW	9	El Bilal Touré		(substituted on) 84'
MF	23	Aliou Dieng		(substituted on) 108'
Manager:
Mohamed Magassouba

GK	1	Jesús Owono
RB	15	Carlos Akapo (c)
CB	21	Esteban Obiang
CB	16	Saúl Coco
LB	11	Basilio Ndong
RM	6	Iban Salvador	(yellow card) 23'
CM	22	Pablo Ganet	(yellow card) 43'
CM	8	José Machín		(substituted off) 82'
LM	17	Josete Miranda	(yellow card) 32'	(substituted off) 63'
SS	4	Federico Bikoro	(yellow card) 74'	(substituted off) 82'
CF	18	Dorian Junior		(substituted off) 63'
Substitutions:
FW	10	Emilio Nsue		(substituted on) 63'
MF	14	Jannick Buyla		(substituted on) 63'
MF	7	Rubén Belima		(substituted on) 82'
MF	20	Santiago Eneme		(substituted on) 82'
Manager:
Juan Michá

Man of the Match:
Pablo Ganet (Equatorial Guinea)

Assistant referees:
Jerson Emiliano dos Santos (Angola)
Issa Yaya (Chad)
Fourth official:
Joshua Bondo (Botswana)
Video assistant referee:
Adil Zourak (Morocco)
Assistant video assistant referees:
Samir Guezzaz (Morocco)
Zakhele Siwela (South Africa)

== Quarter-finals ==
=== Gambia vs Cameroon ===
29 January 2022
17:00

Gambia	0–2	Cameroon
	Report	Toko Ekambi 50', 57'

Japoma Stadium, Douala
Attendance: 36,259
Referee: Pacifique Ndabihawenimana (Burundi)

Gambia	Cameroon

GK	18	Baboucarr Gaye	(yellow card) 40'
CB	12	James Gomez
CB	6	Sulayman Marreh		(substituted off) 82'
CB	5	Omar Colley
RWB	14	Noah Sonko Sundberg	(yellow card) 21'	(substituted off) 85'
LWB	13	Pa Modou Jagne (c)	(yellow card) 33'	(substituted off) 56'
CM	21	Saidy Janko		(substituted off) 56'
CM	2	Yusupha Bobb
CM	26	Ibou Touray
SS	10	Musa Barrow
CF	23	Muhammed Badamosi		(substituted off) 56'
Substitutions:
MF	8	Ebrima Darboe		(substituted on) 56'
FW	11	Modou Barrow		(substituted on) 56'
FW	19	Ebrima Colley		(substituted on) 56'
FW	17	Bubacarr Jobe		(substituted on) 82'
FW	9	Assan Ceesay		(substituted on) 85'
Manager:
(Belgium) Tom Saintfiet

GK	24	André Onana
RB	19	Collins Fai		(substituted off) 84'
CB	21	Jean-Charles Castelletto
CB	5	Michael Ngadeu-Ngadjui	(yellow card) 48'
LB	25	Nouhou Tolo
RM	18	Martin Hongla		(substituted off) 81'
CM	14	Samuel Gouet
CM	8	André-Frank Zambo Anguissa		(substituted off) 87'
LM	3	Moumi Ngamaleu		(substituted off) 88'
CF	12	Karl Toko Ekambi		(substituted off) 81'
CF	10	Vincent Aboubakar (c)
Substitutions:
FW	7	Clinton N'Jie		(substituted on) 81'
MF	15	Pierre Kunde		(substituted on) 81'
DF	17	Olivier Mbaizo		(substituted on) 84'
MF	28	Yvan Neyou		(substituted on) 87'
FW	11	Christian Bassogog		(substituted on) 88'
Manager:
(Portugal) Toni Conceição

Man of the Match:
Karl Toko Ekambi (Cameroon)

Assistant referees:
Mohammed Abdallah Ibrahim (Sudan)
Seydou Tiama (Burkina Faso)
Fourth official:
Boubou Traore (Mali)
Video assistant referee:
Haythem Guirat (Tunisia)
Assistant video assistant referees:
Lahlou Benbraham (Algeria)
Khalil Hassani (Tunisia)

=== Burkina Faso vs Tunisia ===
29 January 2022
20:00

Burkina Faso	1–0	Tunisia
Da. Ouattara 45+3'	Report

Roumdé Adjia Stadium, Garoua
Referee: Joshua Bondo (Botswana)

Burkina Faso	Tunisia

GK	16	Hervé Koffi (c)	(yellow card) 44'
RB	9	Issa Kaboré
CB	4	Soumaïla Ouattara
CB	12	Edmond Tapsoba	(yellow card) 67'
LB	25	Steeve Yago
CM	24	Adama Guira
CM	22	Blati Touré
RW	20	Gustavo Sangaré
AM	21	Cyrille Bayala	(yellow card) 80'
LW	28	Dango Ouattara	(red card) 83'
CF	2	Djibril Ouattara		(substituted off) 81'
Substitutions:
FW	11	Mohamed Konaté		(substituted on) 81'
Other disciplinary actions:
FW	19	Hassane Bandé	(yellow card) 88'
Manager:
Kamou Malo

GK	22	Bechir Ben Saïd
RB	20	Mohamed Dräger
CB	6	Dylan Bronn
CB	2	Bilel Ifa
LB	5	Oussama Haddadi		(substituted off) 46'
CM	25	Anis Ben Slimane		(substituted off) 46'
CM	17	Ellyes Skhiri		(substituted off) 84'
CM	28	Aïssa Laïdouni	(yellow card) 47'
RF	10	Wahbi Khazri
CF	11	Seifeddine Jaziri		(substituted off) 75'
LF	7	Youssef Msakni (c)
Substitutions:
FW	23	Naïm Sliti		(substituted on) 46'
DF	12	Ali Maâloul		(substituted on) 46'
FW	27	Issam Jebali		(substituted on) 75'
MF	19	Hamza Rafia		(substituted on) 84'
Manager:
Mondher Kebaier

Man of the Match:
Blati Touré (Burkina Faso)

Assistant referees:
Arsenio Marengula (Mozambique)
Gilbert Cheruiyot (Kenya)
Fourth official:
Peter Waweru (Kenya)
Video assistant referee:
Rédouane Jiyed (Morocco)
Assistant video assistant referees:
Adil Zourak (Morocco)
Fatiha Jermoumi (Morocco)

=== Egypt vs Morocco ===
30 January 2022
16:00 (Note: The Egypt v Morocco match was originally scheduled to kick-off at 17:00, but was rescheduled to 16:00.)

Egypt	2–1 (a.e.t.)	Morocco
Salah 53'; Trézéguet 100'	Report	Boufal 7' (pen.)

Ahmadou Ahidjo Stadium, Yaoundé (Note: The match was originally due to be held at Olembe Stadium in Yaoundé, but was relocated due to the investigation into the Yaoundé stadium disaster.)
Referee: Maguette N'Diaye (Senegal)

Egypt	Morocco

GK	16	Mohamed Abou Gabal		(substituted off) 96'
RB	3	Omar Kamal	(yellow card) 25'
CB	6	Ahmed Hegazi		(substituted off) 46'
CB	2	Mohamed Abdelmonem	(yellow card) 106'
LB	13	Ahmed Fatouh
CM	4	Amr El Solia
CM	17	Mohamed Elneny
CM	12	Ayman Ashraf	(yellow card) 80'	(substituted off) 91'
RF	10	Mohamed Salah (c)		(substituted off) 120+3'
CF	14	Mostafa Mohamed	(yellow card) 78'	(substituted off) 111'
LF	22	Omar Marmoush		(substituted off) 80'
Substitutions:
FW	7	Trézéguet		(substituted on) 46'
MF	21	Zizo		(substituted on) 80'
DF	20	Mahmoud Alaa		(substituted on) 91'
GK	23	Mohamed Sobhy		(substituted on) 96'
FW	11	Ramadan Sobhi		(substituted on) 111'
FW	28	Marwan Hamdy		(substituted on) 120+3'
Manager:
(Portugal) Carlos Queiroz

GK	1	Yassine Bounou
RB	2	Achraf Hakimi	(yellow card) 78'
CB	6	Romain Saïss (c)
CB	5	Nayef Aguerd
LB	3	Adam Masina
DM	4	Sofyan Amrabat
RM	10	Munir El Haddadi		(substituted off) 110'
CM	16	Aymen Barkok		(substituted off) 104'
CM	15	Selim Amallah	(yellow card) 34'	(substituted off) 86'
LM	17	Sofiane Boufal		(substituted off) 66'
CF	19	Youssef En-Nesyri		(substituted off) 86'
Substitutions:
FW	27	Soufiane Rahimi		(substituted on) 66'
MF	7	Imran Louza		(substituted on) 86'
FW	23	Ryan Mmaee		(substituted on) 86'
FW	14	Zakaria Aboukhlal		(substituted on) 104'
FW	28	Tarik Tissoudali		(substituted on) 110'
Manager:
(Bosnia and Herzegovina) Vahid Halilhodžić

Man of the Match:
Mohamed Salah (Egypt)

Assistant referees:
El Hadj Malick Samba (Senegal)
Djibril Camara (Senegal)
Fourth official:
Sadok Selmi (Tunisia)
Video assistant referee:
Fernando Guerrero (Mexico)
Assistant video assistant referees:
Dahane Beida (Mauritania)
Jerson Emiliano dos Santos (Angola)

=== Senegal vs Equatorial Guinea ===
30 January 2022
20:00

Senegal	3–1	Equatorial Guinea
Diédhiou 28'; Kouyaté 68'; I. Sarr 79'	Report	Buyla 57'

Ahmadou Ahidjo Stadium, Yaoundé (Note: The match was originally due to be held at Japoma Stadium in Douala, but was relocated.)
Referee: Victor Gomes (South Africa)

Senegal	Equatorial Guinea

GK	16	Édouard Mendy
RB	20	Bouna Sarr
CB	3	Kalidou Koulibaly (c)
CB	22	Abdou Diallo
LB	2	Saliou Ciss	(yellow card) 9'
CM	5	Idrissa Gueye
CM	6	Nampalys Mendy
CM	26	Pape Gueye	(yellow card) 18'	(substituted off) 65'
RF	9	Boulaye Dia		(substituted off) 58'
CF	19	Famara Diédhiou		(substituted off) 65'
LF	10	Sadio Mané
Substitutions:
FW	18	Ismaïla Sarr		(substituted on) 58'
FW	15	Bamba Dieng		(substituted on) 65'
MF	8	Cheikhou Kouyaté		(substituted on) 65'
Manager:
Aliou Cissé

GK	1	Jesús Owono
CB	15	Carlos Akapo
CB	21	Esteban Obiang
CB	16	Saúl Coco
LB	11	Basilio Ndong
RM	6	Iban Salvador		(substituted off) 80'
CM	22	Pablo Ganet		(substituted off) 72'
CM	8	José Machín	(yellow card) 36'	(substituted off) 85'
LM	14	Jannick Buyla
SS	17	Josete Miranda		(substituted off) 80'
CF	10	Emilio Nsue (c)		(substituted off) 81'
Substitutions:
MF	4	Federico Bikoro		(substituted on) 72'
MF	20	Santiago Eneme		(substituted on) 80'
MF	7	Rubén Belima		(substituted on) 80'
FW	27	Pedro Oba		(substituted on) 81'
MF	24	Álex Balboa		(substituted on) 85'
Manager:
Juan Michá

Man of the Match:
Nampalys Mendy (Senegal)

Assistant referees:
Zakhele Siwela (South Africa)
Souru Phatsoane (Lesotho)
Fourth official:
Daniel Nii Laryea (Ghana)
Video assistant referee:
Mahmoud Mohamed Ashour (Egypt)
Assistant video assistant referees:
Mahmoud El Banna (Egypt)
Mahmoud Ahmed Abouelregal (Egypt)

== Semi-finals ==
=== Burkina Faso vs Senegal ===
2 February 2022
20:00

Burkina Faso	1–3	Senegal
Touré 82'	Report	A. Diallo 70'; I. Gueye 76'; Mané 87'

Ahmadou Ahidjo Stadium, Yaoundé
Referee: Bamlak Tessema Weyesa (Ethiopia)

Burkina Faso	Senegal

GK	16	Hervé Koffi		(substituted off) 36'
RB	9	Issa Kaboré
CB	14	Issoufou Dayo
CB	12	Edmond Tapsoba
LB	25	Steeve Yago
CM	20	Gustavo Sangaré
CM	24	Adama Guira	(yellow card) 28'	(substituted off) 81'
CM	22	Blati Touré
RF	19	Hassane Bandé		(substituted off) 81'
CF	10	Bertrand Traoré (c)
LF	21	Cyrille Bayala		(substituted off) 60'
Substitutions:
GK	23	Farid Ouédraogo		(substituted on) 36'
FW	17	Zakaria Sanogo		(substituted on) 60'
FW	15	Abdoul Tapsoba		(substituted on) 81'
FW	2	Djibril Ouattara		(substituted on) 81'
Manager:
Kamou Malo

GK	16	Édouard Mendy
RB	20	Bouna Sarr	(yellow card) 50'
CB	3	Kalidou Koulibaly (c)
CB	22	Abdou Diallo
LB	2	Saliou Ciss
CM	8	Cheikhou Kouyaté		(substituted off) 65'
CM	6	Nampalys Mendy		(substituted off) 90+2'
RW	15	Bamba Dieng		(substituted off) 78'
AM	5	Idrissa Gueye
LW	10	Sadio Mané
CF	19	Famara Diédhiou		(substituted off) 65'
Substitutions:
MF	26	Pape Gueye		(substituted on) 65'
FW	18	Ismaïla Sarr		(substituted on) 65'
MF	17	Pape Matar Sarr		(substituted on) 78'
DF	4	Pape Abou Cissé	(yellow card) 90+3'	(substituted on) 90+2'
Manager:
Aliou Cissé

Man of the Match:
Sadio Mané (Senegal)

Assistant referees:
Mohammed Abdallah Ibrahim (Sudan)
Gilbert Cheruiyot (Kenya)
Fourth official:
Peter Waweru (Kenya)
Reserve assistant referee:
Attia Amsaaed (Libya)
Video assistant referee:
Rédouane Jiyed (Morocco)
Assistant video assistant referees:
Bouchra Karboubi (Morocco)
Fatiha Jermoumi (Morocco)

=== Cameroon vs Egypt ===
3 February 2022
20:00

Cameroon	0–0 (a.e.t.)	Egypt
	Report
Penalties
Aboubakar (penalty scored); Moukoudi (penalty missed); Léa Siliki (penalty missed); N'Jie (penalty missed)	1–3	(penalty scored) Zizo; (penalty scored) Abdelmonem; (penalty scored) Lasheen

Olembe Stadium, Yaoundé
Attendance: 24,371
Referee: Bakary Gassama (Gambia)

Cameroon	Egypt

GK	24	André Onana
CB	21	Jean-Charles Castelletto		(substituted off) 99'
CB	5	Michael Ngadeu-Ngadjui
CB	25	Nouhou Tolo
RM	19	Collins Fai
CM	8	André-Frank Zambo Anguissa
CM	14	Samuel Gouet	(yellow card) 61'	(substituted off) 80'
LM	18	Martin Hongla		(substituted off) 108'
RF	3	Moumi Ngamaleu		(substituted off) 86'
CF	10	Vincent Aboubakar (c)
LF	12	Karl Toko Ekambi		(substituted off) 98'
Substitutions:
MF	27	James Léa Siliki		(substituted on) 80'
FW	7	Clinton N'Jie		(substituted on) 86'
FW	11	Christian Bassogog		(substituted on) 98'
DF	4	Harold Moukoudi		(substituted on) 99'
MF	26	Jean Onana		(substituted on) 108'
Manager:
(Portugal) Toni Conceição

GK	16	Mohamed Abou Gabal
RB	3	Omar Kamal	(yellow card) 37'	(substituted off) 85'
CB	2	Mohamed Abdelmonem
CB	15	Mahmoud Hamdy
LB	13	Ahmed Fatouh
CM	17	Mohamed Elneny	(yellow card) 61'	(substituted off) 86'
CM	5	Hamdy Fathy
CM	4	Amr El Solia		(substituted off) 46'
RF	10	Mohamed Salah (c)
CF	14	Mostafa Mohamed		(substituted off) 106'
LF	22	Omar Marmoush		(substituted off) 63'
Substitutions:
FW	7	Trézéguet		(substituted on) 46'
FW	11	Ramadan Sobhi		(substituted on) 63'
MF	8	Emam Ashour		(substituted on) 85'
MF	18	Mohanad Lasheen		(substituted on) 86'
FW	9	Mohamed Sherif		(substituted on) 106'	(substituted off) 118'
MF	21	Zizo		(substituted on) 118'
Manager:
(Portugal) Carlos Queiroz			(yellow card) 87' (yellow-red card) 89'

Man of the Match:
Mohamed Abdelmonem (Egypt)

Assistant referees:
Jerson Emiliano dos Santos (Angola)
Arsenio Marengula (Mozambique)
Fourth official:
Joshua Bondo (Botswana)
Reserve assistant referee:
Soulaimane Amaldine (Comoros)
Video assistant referee:
Haythem Guirat (Tunisia)
Assistant video assistant referees:
Lahlou Benbraham (Algeria)
Khalil Hassani (Tunisia)

== Third place play-off ==
5 February 2022
20:00 (Note: The match was originally due to be held on 6 February 2022 at 17:00, but was rescheduled due to security and convenience reasons.)

Burkina Faso	3–3	Cameroon
Yago 24'; A. Onana 43' (o.g.); Dj. Ouattara 49'	Report	Bahoken 71'; Aboubakar 85', 87'
Penalties
Kaboré (penalty scored); S. Ouattara (penalty scored); Touré (penalty missed); Yago (penalty scored)	3–5	(penalty scored) Aboubakar; (penalty scored) Ngamaleu; (penalty scored) Toko Ekambi; (penalty scored) Kunde; (penalty scored) Oyongo

Ahmadou Ahidjo Stadium, Yaoundé
Referee: Redouane Jiyed (Morocco)

Burkina Faso	Cameroon

GK	23	Farid Ouédraogo		(substituted off) 90+4'
RB	9	Issa Kaboré
CB	4	Soumaïla Ouattara
CB	12	Edmond Tapsoba	(yellow card) 77'
LB	25	Steeve Yago
CM	22	Blati Touré
CM	18	Ismahila Ouédraogo	(yellow card) 68'
RW	10	Bertrand Traoré (c)		(substituted off) 87'
AM	20	Gustavo Sangaré
LW	15	Abdoul Tapsoba	(yellow card) 52'	(substituted off) 87'
CF	2	Djibril Ouattara		(substituted off) 90+4'
Substitutions:
FW	7	Eric Traoré		(substituted on) 87'
FW	19	Hassane Bandé		(substituted on) 87'
FW	11	Mohamed Konaté		(substituted on) 90+4'
GK	1	Aboubacar Sawadogo		(substituted on) 90+4'
Manager:
Kamou Malo

GK	24	André Onana
RB	17	Olivier Mbaizo
CB	22	Jérôme Onguéné
CB	4	Harold Moukoudi
LB	6	Ambroise Oyongo (c)
CM	26	Jean Onana
CM	14	Samuel Gouet		(substituted off) 46'
RW	11	Christian Bassogog		(substituted off) 54'
AM	15	Pierre Kunde
LW	20	Ignatius Ganago		(substituted off) 46'
CF	9	Stéphane Bahoken	(yellow card) 48'
Substitutions:
FW	10	Vincent Aboubakar		(substituted on) 46'
FW	3	Moumi Ngamaleu		(substituted on) 46'
FW	12	Karl Toko Ekambi	(yellow card) 68'	(substituted on) 54'
Manager:
(Portugal) Toni Conceição

Man of the Match:
Bertrand Traoré (Burkina Faso)

Assistant referees:
Lahcen Azgaou (Morocco)
Mustapha Akarkad (Morocco)
Fourth official:
Sadok Selmi (Tunisia)
Reserve assistant referee:
Attia Amsaaed (Libya)
Video assistant referee:
Haythem Guirat (Tunisia)
Assistant video assistant referees:
Lahlou Benbraham (Algeria)
Khalil Hassani (Tunisia)

== Final ==
6 February 2022
20:00

Senegal	0–0 (a.e.t.)	Egypt
	Report
Penalties
Koulibaly (penalty scored); A. Diallo (penalty scored); B. Sarr (penalty missed); B. Dieng (penalty scored); Mané (penalty scored)	4–2	(penalty scored) Zizo; (penalty missed) Abdelmonem; (penalty scored) Mar. Hamdy; (penalty missed) Lasheen

Olembe Stadium, Yaoundé
Attendance: 48,000
Referee: Victor Gomes (South Africa)

Senegal	Egypt

GK	16	Édouard Mendy
RB	20	Bouna Sarr
CB	3	Kalidou Koulibaly (c)	(yellow card) 44'
CB	22	Abdou Diallo	(yellow card) 54'
LB	2	Saliou Ciss
CM	8	Cheikhou Kouyaté		(substituted off) 66'
CM	6	Nampalys Mendy	(yellow card) 17'
CM	5	Idrissa Gueye
RF	18	Ismaïla Sarr		(substituted off) 77'
CF	19	Famara Diédhiou		(substituted off) 77'
LF	10	Sadio Mané	(yellow card) 88'
Substitutions:
FW	26	Pape Gueye		(substituted on) 66'
FW	9	Boulaye Dia		(substituted on) 77'
FW	15	Bamba Dieng		(substituted on) 77'
Manager:
Aliou Cissé

GK	16	Mohamed Abou Gabal
RB	8	Emam Ashour
CB	2	Mohamed Abdelmonem	(yellow card) 5'
CB	15	Mahmoud Hamdy
LB	13	Ahmed Fatouh
CM	5	Hamdy Fathy	(yellow card) 37'	(substituted off) 99'
CM	17	Mohamed Elneny
CM	4	Amr El Solia		(substituted off) 59'
RF	10	Mohamed Salah (c)
CF	14	Mostafa Mohamed		(substituted off) 59'
LF	22	Omar Marmoush		(substituted off) 59'
Substitutions:
FW	7	Trézéguet		(substituted on) 59'
MF	21	Zizo		(substituted on) 59'
FW	28	Marwan Hamdy		(substituted on) 59'
FW	18	Mohanad Lasheen		(substituted on) 99'
Manager:
Diaa El-Sayed (Note: Egypt manager Carlos Queiroz was suspended for the match due to his sending off in Egypt's match against Cameroon. Assistant manager Diaa El-Sayed filled in as manager.)

Man of the Match:
Mohamed Abou Gabal (Egypt)

Assistant referees:
Zakhele Siwela (South Africa)
Souru Phatsoane (Lesotho)
Fourth official:
Jean-Jacques Ndala (DR Congo)
Reserve assistant referee:
Olivier Safari (DR Congo)
Video assistant referee:
Adil Zourak (Morocco)
Assistant video assistant referees:
Bouchra Karboubi (Morocco)
Zakaria Brinsi (Morocco)
