= 2021 Africa Cup of Nations final =

Football match

- Official match poster
- Event: 2021 Africa Cup of Nations
Senegal	Egypt
0	0
- After extra time Senegal won 4–2 on penalties
- Date: 6 February 2022
- Venue: Olembe Stadium, Yaoundé
- Man of the Match: Mohamed Abou Gabal (Egypt)
- Referee: Victor Gomes (South Africa)
- Attendance: 48,000
- Weather: Partly cloudy 20 °C (68 °F); 77% humidity

The 2021 Africa Cup of Nations final was a football match that determined the winner of the 2021 Africa Cup of Nations, the international men's football championship of Africa, organized by the Confederation of African Football (CAF) which was played between Senegal and Egypt. The match was held at the Olembe Stadium in Yaoundé, Cameroon, on 6 February 2022. The match was won 4–2 by Senegal on penalties, after the match had ended in a 0–0 draw.

There were no goals scored in the first 90 minutes of the match, and extra-time was goalless as well. The best chance of the game was a penalty taken by Sadio Mané, which was saved by Egyptian goalkeeper Mohamed Abou Gabal in the seventh minute. Neither team had much clear-cut chances. With the score level, the match went to a penalty shoot-out. The score was 3–2 to Senegal when Édouard Mendy made a decisive save from Mohanad Lasheen; Mané, who had missed his earlier penalty, decided the match when he scored past Gabal to give Senegal the title.

The win meant that Senegal had won their first Africa Cup of Nations ever, after previously losing in the final twice, in 2002 and 2019. Mohamed Abou Gabal of Egypt was named man of the match, despite being on the losing team. Upon returning home, Senegal took part in a victory parade in the capital, Dakar, with over half a million supporters; it was one of the biggest celebrations in the country's history. As a result of the tournament, Senegal rose up two spots to 18th in the world rankings, their best ever ranking, while Egypt rose up eleven spots to 34th.

== Background ==
The Africa Cup of Nations, organised by the Confederation of African Football (CAF), is the primary international association football competition for African national teams. The 2021 tournament was the 33rd edition since its inauguration in 1957. The hosts were Cameroon, who were originally awarded the rights to host the 2019 tournament. However, because of delays in construction of stadiums and other necessary infrastructure, CAF stripped Cameroon from hosting the 2019 tournament and it was relocated to Egypt. CAF President Ahmad Ahmad later said that Cameroon had agreed to host the 2021 tournament instead. For the second time in the tournament's history, it consisted of twenty-four teams who had qualified for the event, with hosts Cameroon participating in qualifiers despite qualifying automatically; the teams were then divided into six round-robin groups consisting of four teams. The two top teams from each group, and the four best third-placed teams advanced to a knock-out phase.

Egypt were appearing in their 25th tournament, and their 10th final. With this final, Egypt surpassed Ghana in number of final appearances. They had previously won seven (1957, 1959, 1986, 1998, 2006, 2008, 2010) and lost two (1962 against Ethiopia, 2017 against Cameroon). This tournament also marked the first time Carlos Queiroz have guided a national team to the final of a competitive football tournament, having done so only with Portugal U-20.

Senegal were appearing in their 16th tournament, and their third final. They had lost in both of their previous finals appearances (2002 against Cameroon and 2019 against Algeria). Senegal reached their second consecutive final, the first since Egypt's three consecutive finals and titles in 2006, 2008, and 2010. This was the two teams' first meeting in the final.

At the start of the tournament, Senegal, in 20th place, were the highest African nation in the FIFA World Rankings, while Egypt were 6th (45th in the world).

== Route to the final ==
Senegal qualified for the knockout stages by finishing at the top of their group with five points. They reached the final by beating Equatorial Guinea and Burkina Faso in the quarter-final and semi-final respectively. Egypt finished second in Group D behind Nigeria. They defeated Morocco in the quarter-finals, and then knocked out hosts Cameroon on penalties.

Senegal
Round
Egypt
Opponents
Result
Group stage
Opponents
Result
Zimbabwe
1–0
Match 1
Nigeria
0–1
Guinea
0–0
Match 2
Guinea-Bissau
1–0
Malawi
0–0
Match 3
Sudan
1–0
Group B winners

Pos	Team	Pld	Pts
1	Senegal	3	5
2	Guinea	3	4
3	Malawi	3	4
4	Zimbabwe	3	3

Source: CAF
Final standings
Group D runners-up

Pos	Team	Pld	Pts
1	Nigeria	3	9
2	Egypt	3	6
3	Sudan	3	1
4	Guinea-Bissau	3	1

Source: CAF
Opponents
Result
Knockout stage
Opponents
Result
Cape Verde
2–0
Round of 16
Ivory Coast
0–0 (a.e.t.) (5–4 p)
Equatorial Guinea
3–1
Quarter-finals
Morocco
2–1 (a.e.t.)
Burkina Faso
3–1
Semi-finals
Cameroon
0–0 (a.e.t.) (3–1 p)

=== Egypt ===
Egypt was placed in Group D, alongside Nigeria, Sudan and Guinea-Bissau. In the opening match of the group on 11 January 2022, Egypt lost to Nigeria, with the sole goal of the match coming from Kelechi Iheanacho. However, the Pharaohs won their next match 1–0 against Guinea-Bissau, thanks to a goal from Mohamed Salah; this match was controversial as it saw a late Bissau-Guinean equalizer disallowed by VAR. Another 1–0 win against Sudan, courtesy of a Mohamed Abdelmonem header, saw Egypt secure second place in their group with six points, behind Nigeria, who were the only team across all six groups to win all three group matches.

On 26 January, they met Ivory Coast in the round of 16, who had topped their group, having defeated reigning champions Algeria in their last group game. A goalless match was followed by a penalty shootout; after Eric Bailly's shot was saved by substitute goalkeeper Mohamed Abou Gabal, Salah converted the decisive spot-kick. Egypt then faced Morocco in the quarter-finals. Sofiane Boufal converted an early penalty to give Morocco the advantage, but Salah scored the equalizer in the 55th minute. Egypt eventually won after extra time, as Salah assisted a decisive goal by Trézéguet in the 100th minute. In the semi-finals, Egypt beat hosts and five-time champions Cameroon on penalties after a goalless draw; during the penalty shoot-out, Cameroon missed three of their four spot-kicks, including the decisive penalty taken by Clinton N’Jie. This victory meant Egypt reached their 10th Africa Cup of Nations final and were the first ever team to win three consecutive knockout matches in the competition after extra time.

=== Senegal ===
Senegal was placed in Group B alongside Guinea, Malawi and Zimbabwe. Senegal won their first group match with a last-minute penalty converted by team captain Sadio Mané. However, they drew to both Guinea and Malawi in their next two group matches without scoring any goals. Despite this, they still finished first in their group; with only one goal scored in three matches, they achieved the worst goalscoring record of all teams qualified to the round of 16, scoring even less than the eliminated Zimbabwe team.

On 25 January in the round of 16, they met Cape Verde, which was one of the top performing third place teams in the tournament. During this match, Patrick Andrade and goalkeeper Vozinha from Cape Verde were sent off in the 21st and 57th minute respectively; Vozinha's sending off led to striker Garry Rodrigues being replaced by Márcio Rosa two minutes later. Goals by Mané and Bamba Dieng secured Senegal's qualification to the quarter-finals. Five days later, they comfortably beat Equatorial Guinea 3–1 thanks to goals from Famara Diédhiou and substitutes Cheikhou Kouyaté and Ismaïla Sarr. They met Burkina Faso in the semi-finals. During the match, two penalties for Senegal in the first half were denied by VAR. They nonetheless defeated the Stallions by a score of 3–1, courtesy of goals from Abdou Diallo, Bamba Dieng, and Sadio Mane. This meant the West African nation reached their second consecutive Africa Cup of Nations final.

== Pre-match ==
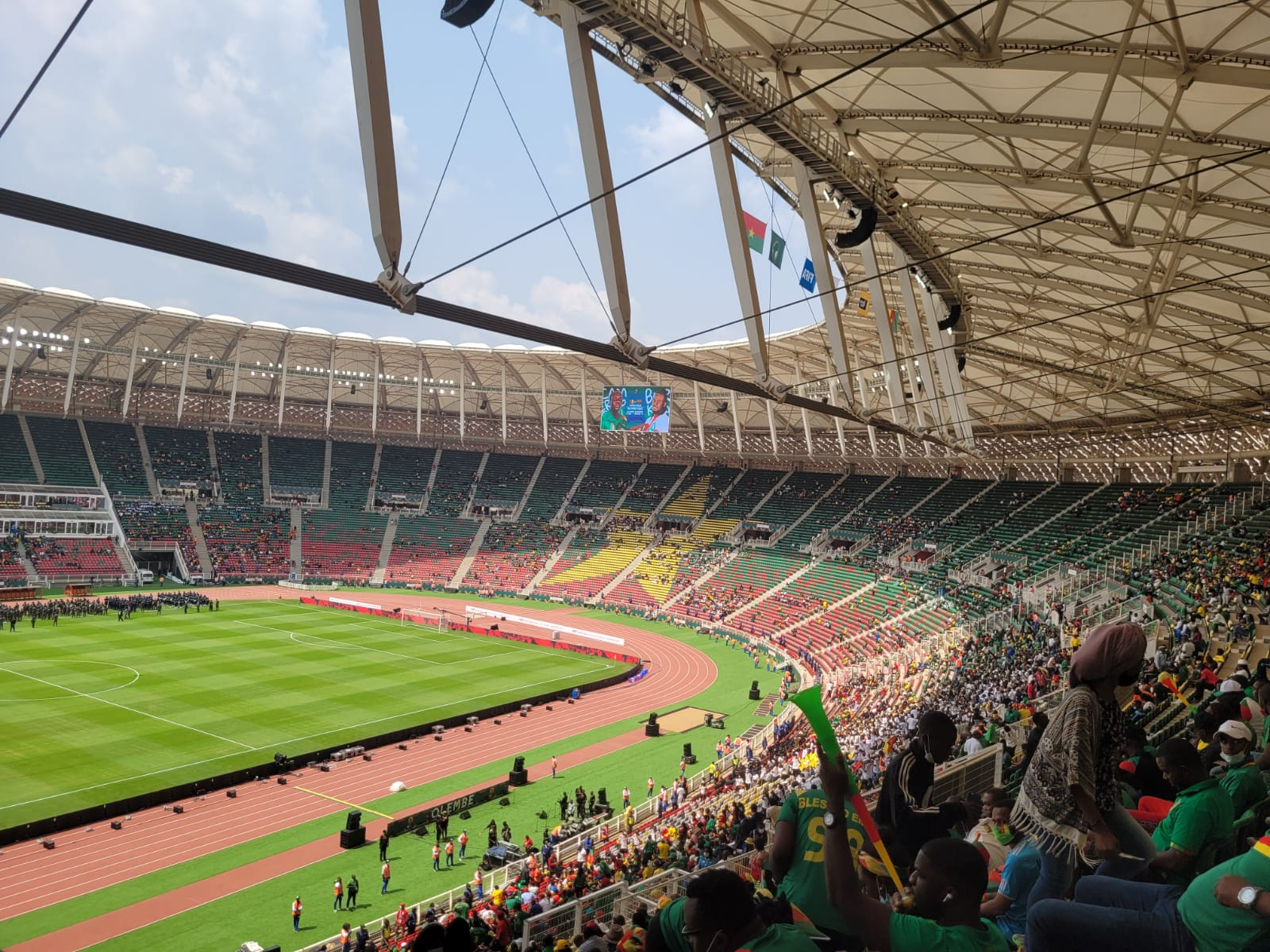
The Olembe Stadium, which hosted the final.

Senegal's starting lineup was almost unchanged from the team which had started against Burkina Faso in the semi-finals, the only change being Ismaïla Sarr who started in place of Bamba Dieng. Egypt also made a change from the semi-finals, with Emam Ashour starting at right-back instead of Omar Kamal, who was suspended after receiving two yellow cards during the knockout stage. Egypt's coach Carlos Queiroz was suspended from the match after being dismissed in the semi-finals, so assistant coach Diaa El-Sayed took his place on the touchline.

South African referee Victor Gomes officiated the final, accompanied by compatriot Zakhele Siwela and Souru Phatsoane of Lesotho as assistant referees. Jean-Jacques Ndala and Olivier Safari from the Democratic Republic of the Congo were on duty as the fourth official and reserve assistant referee respectively, while Adil Zourak of Morocco served as the video assistant referee. Having previously officiated during the 2019 tournament, Gomes had refereed three matches during the 2021 tournament, including the quarter-final between Senegal and Equatorial Guinea. He was the first South African to referee an Africa Cup of Nations final.

A minute's silence was held before kick-off in memory of Rayan Oram, a five-year-old boy from Morocco who had died the day prior to the game after being trapped down a well for four days.

== Match ==
=== First half ===
The first clear-cut chance came in the fifth minute, when Senegal were awarded a penalty when Mohamed Abdelmonem fouled Saliou Ciss in the penalty area. Abdelmonem was awarded the first yellow card of the game in the process. However, the penalty from Sadio Mané was saved by Mohamed Abou Gabal diving to his right. Egypt's first chance came when Mohamed Salah swung in a free-kick towards Mahmoud Hamdy, but it was caught by Senegalese goalkeeper Édouard Mendy. Senegal dominated the first half by playing mainly down the wings, aiming crosses towards their forwards, but none resulted in a goal. Another chance fell to Salah, when he evaded the Senegal defenders and dribbled into the box, but he scuffed his shot, making it an easy save for Mendy.

Another Senegal chance came in the 39th minute, when Famara Diédhiou flicked Ismaïla Sarr's cross towards goal, but Abou Gabal easily saved the shot. Egypt's strategy was to sit back and attempt the long ball, allowing Senegal to have the majority of the possession. The game was also a very physical one and multiple players received yellow cards, including Abdelmonem, Nampalys Mendy, Hamdy Fathy, and Senegal captain Kalidou Koulibaly. The first half ended with a score line of 0–0. Will Unwin of The Guardian commented, "Senegal look like a decent football team, while Egypt do not."

=== Second half ===
Senegal received a free-kick after Mane was brought down at the edge of the box. Idrissa Gueye's effort however, went wide and over the bar. Senegal continued their focus on wing play, but failed to convert most of their crosses. One of them came from left-back Saliou Ciss, which was aimed at Diedhou, who couldn't take the chance. Both sides also kept constantly fouling. Egypt's best chance of the game thus far came when Zizo curled a free kick into the box, which was met by Abdelmonem, whose effort went over the bar. Egypt's attacking play improved in the second half, with another chance coming when a Trézéguet cross was flicked wide by Hamdy Fathy. Egypt later won a corner, but it was easily cleared by the Senegalese defense. Egypt stalled the last 5 minutes of regular time and heading into extra time, the two sides were still level at 0–0.

=== Extra time ===
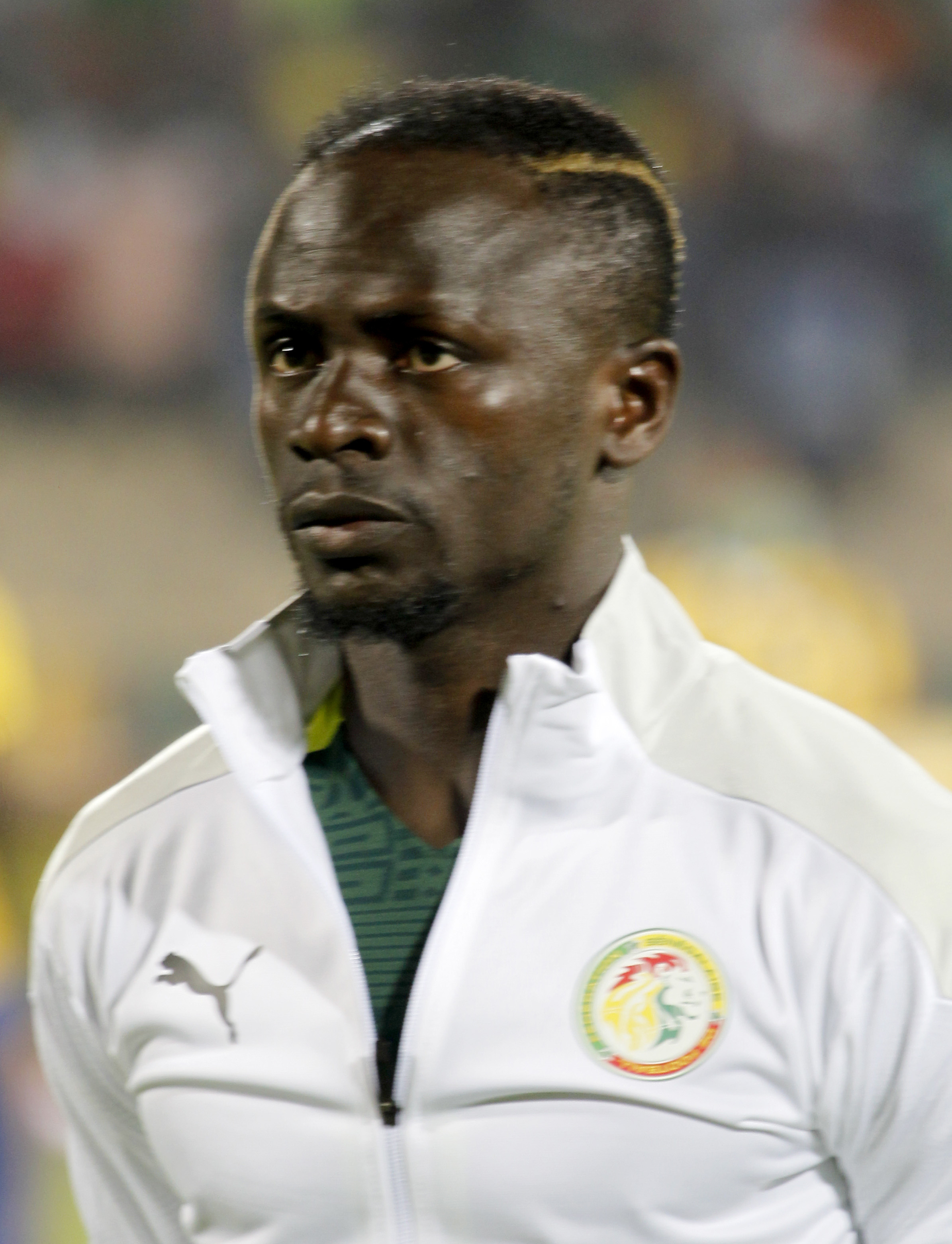
Sadio Mané scored the decisive penalty in the shoot-out

Senegal had the first opportunity of extra time, with a Mané cross finding Bamba Dieng, whose attempt was saved by Abou Gabal. In the 100th minute, Trézéguet received the ball 14 yards away from goal, but had his shot saved by Édouard Mendy. Senegal had another opportunity to score the game's first goal from a corner, but Abdou Diallo's header sailed wide. With Egypt sitting back and playing conservatively, they allowed Senegal most of the chances in the extra time period. In the 115th minute, a long-range effort from Bamba Dieng was parried away by Abou Gabal. Two minutes later, Marwan Hamdy's shot from 16 yards out was tipped over the bar by Édouard Mendy. The resulting corner was dealt with by Senegal, and extra time ended still goalless, meaning the final had to be decided by a penalty shoot-out.

=== Penalty shoot-out ===
Senegal's captain Kalidou Kouliably was up first in the shoot-out, and scored. Egyptian goalkeeper Abou Gabal went the right way, but couldn't keep it out. Zizo scored for Egypt to keep the score level. After Diallo converted his spot-kick just beyond Abou Gabal, it was Abdelmonem next, who conceded the earlier penalty in the 5th minute. His shot went off the post, making it a 2–1 advantage in Senegal's favor. Bouna Sarr's penalty was saved by Gabal, after he decided to go left. After the substitute Marwan Hamdy scored the next penalty for Egypt, the two teams were level again at 2–2. Bamba Dieng scored the next penalty for Senegal. The next penalty taker was Mohanad Lasheen. Mendy dived right and saved the penalty, meaning Senegal needed to score the next penalty to win. Sadio Mané, who missed the earlier penalty in the match, stepped up and scored past Abou Gabal low to the left, giving Senegal both the 4–2 shootout victory and their first ever AFCON title.

=== Details ===
6 February 2022
20:00

Senegal	0–0 (a.e.t.)	Egypt
	Report
Penalties
Koulibaly (penalty scored); A. Diallo (penalty scored); B. Sarr (penalty missed); B. Dieng (penalty scored); Mané (penalty scored)	4–2	(penalty scored) Zizo; (penalty missed) Abdelmonem; (penalty scored) Mar. Hamdy; (penalty missed) Lasheen

Olembe Stadium, Yaoundé
Attendance: 48,000
Referee: Victor Gomes (South Africa)

Senegal	Egypt

GK	16	Édouard Mendy
RB	20	Bouna Sarr
CB	3	Kalidou Koulibaly (c)	(yellow card) 44'
CB	22	Abdou Diallo	(yellow card) 54'
LB	2	Saliou Ciss
CM	8	Cheikhou Kouyaté		(substituted off) 66'
CM	6	Nampalys Mendy	(yellow card) 17'
CM	5	Idrissa Gueye
RF	18	Ismaïla Sarr		(substituted off) 77'
CF	19	Famara Diédhiou		(substituted off) 77'
LF	10	Sadio Mané	(yellow card) 88'
Substitutions:
FW	26	Pape Gueye		(substituted on) 66'
FW	9	Boulaye Dia		(substituted on) 77'
FW	15	Bamba Dieng		(substituted on) 77'
Manager:
Aliou Cissé

GK	16	Mohamed Abou Gabal
RB	8	Emam Ashour
CB	2	Mohamed Abdelmonem	(yellow card) 5'
CB	15	Mahmoud Hamdy
LB	13	Ahmed Fatouh
CM	5	Hamdy Fathy	(yellow card) 37'	(substituted off) 99'
CM	17	Mohamed Elneny
CM	4	Amr El Solia		(substituted off) 59'
RF	10	Mohamed Salah (c)
CF	14	Mostafa Mohamed		(substituted off) 59'
LF	22	Omar Marmoush		(substituted off) 59'
Substitutions:
FW	7	Trézéguet		(substituted on) 59'
MF	21	Zizo		(substituted on) 59'
FW	28	Marwan Hamdy		(substituted on) 59'
FW	18	Mohanad Lasheen		(substituted on) 99'
Manager:
Diaa El-Sayed (Note: Egypt manager Carlos Queiroz was suspended for the match due to his sending off in Egypt's match against Cameroon. Assistant manager Diaa El-Sayed filled in as manager.)

Man of the Match:
Mohamed Abou Gabal (Egypt)

Assistant referees:
Zakhele Siwela (South Africa)
Souru Phatsoane (Lesotho)
Fourth official:
Jean-Jacques Ndala (DR Congo)
Reserve assistant referee:
Olivier Safari (DR Congo)
Video assistant referee:
Adil Zourak (Morocco)
Assistant video assistant referees:
Bouchra Karboubi (Morocco)
Zakaria Brinsi (Morocco)

Match rules

- 90 minutes.
- 30 minutes of extra time if necessary.
- Penalty shoot-out if scores still level.
- Maximum of twelve named substitutes.
- Maximum of five substitutions, with a sixth allowed in extra time. (Note: Each team was given only three opportunities to make substitutions, with a fourth opportunity in extra time, excluding substitutions made at half-time, before the start of extra time and at half-time in extra time.)

=== Statistics ===
Statistics	Senegal	Egypt
Goals scored	0	0
Total shots	13	7
Shots on target	8	3
Ball possession	57%	43%
Pass accuracy	82%	76%
Corner kicks	3	4
Saves	3	8
Fouls committed	23	30
Offsides	1	1
Yellow cards	4	2
Red cards	0	0

== Post-match ==
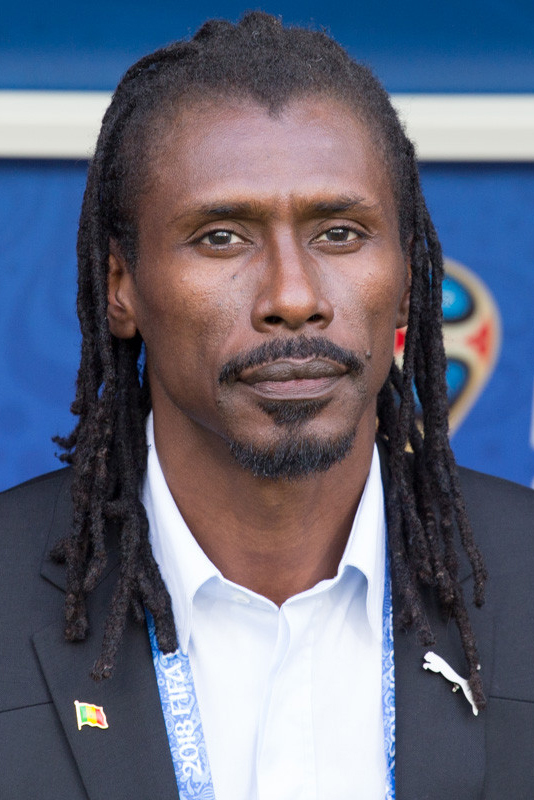
Aliou Cissé, who managed Senegal in the final

In an interview following the match, Senegal manager Aliou Cissé said, "It just shows that if you work hard, if you persevere, you will get what you want, I am very emotional because the people of Senegal have wanted this trophy for 60 years." Cissé had previously lost the 2002 African Cup of Nations Final as captain of Senegal, with him missing his penalty in the shootout. After the match, Sky Sports' Janine Anthony said about Senegal, "They were the better team...it is Senegal's night." The win marked Senegal's first ever Africa Cup of Nations Title. While goalkeeper Gabal was named man of the match, Mané and Edouard Mendy, were named Man of the Tournament and Goalkeeper of the Tournament respectively. Vincent Aboubakar of Cameroon received the golden boot.

Senegal's president Macky Sall declared one day of national holiday and cancelled a state visit to Egypt and Ethiopia to welcome the team in Dakar. Thousands of people from around the country flocked to the streets of Dakar to celebrate, and the environment in the capital was described as "ecstatic" by BBC News. President Sall also awarded the members of the national team with cash prizes and plots of land, and some of them were awarded the National Order of the Lion.

The two teams would play each other in a 2022 FIFA World Cup qualification tie which decided which team would qualify for the World Cup; on 29 March, Senegal once again beat Egypt on penalties.

== See also ==
- 2021 Africa Cup of Nations knockout stage
