= Mohamed Abou Gabal =

Egyptian footballer (born 1989)

Mohamed Abou Gabal مُحَمَّد أَبُو جَبَل
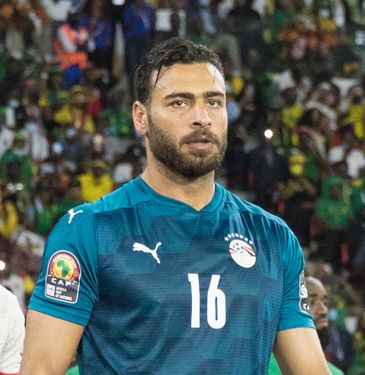
- Abou Gabal with Egypt at the 2021 Africa Cup of Nations

Personal information
- Full name: Mohamed Qotb Abou Gabal Ali
- Date of birth: 29 January 1989 (age 37)
- Place of birth: Asyut, Egypt
- Height: 1.96 m (6 ft 5 in)
- Position: Goalkeeper

Team information
- Current team: MA Tétouan
- Number: 22

Youth career
- 2007–2010: ENPPI

Senior career*
Years	Team	Apps	(Gls)
2010–2013	ENPPI	34	(0)
2013–2016	Zamalek	12	(0)
2016–2019	Smouha	83	(0)
2019–2022	Zamalek	52	(0)
2022–2025	National Bank of Egypt	46	(0)
2025–2026	Modern Sport	15	(0)
2026-	MA Tétouan	0	(0)

International career
2009	Egypt U20	4	(0)
2011–2024	Egypt	13	(0)
Medal record
Representing Egypt
Men's football
Africa Cup of Nations
Runner-up	2021 Cameroon
- * Club domestic league appearances and goals as of 13 September 2026 (UTC)

Mohamed Qotb Abou Gabal Ali (Arabic: مُحَمَّد قُطْب أَبُو جَبَل عَلِيّ; born 29 January 1989), also known as Gabaski, is an Egyptian professional goalkeeper who plays for Botola Pro club Moghreb Atlético Tétouan.

== Club career ==
Abou Gabal played for ENPPI, Smouha and Zamalek. He was nicknamed "Gabaski" by Jesualdo Ferreira in 2015. In September 2022, he joined National Bank of Egypt on free transfer.

In late January 2024, it was reported that he was set to be loaned out to Al Ahly due to a prolonged injury suffered by their goalkeeper, Mohamed El-Shenawy. Nevertheless, the suggested agreement fell through when Al Ahly opted to suspend negotiations just before the contract signing meeting.

== International career ==
On 3 September 2011, Gabaski made his debut for the Egypt national team in a 2–1 away defeat by Sierra Leone, in the 2012 Africa Cup of Nations qualification. He didn't make another appearance for Egypt until 10 years later, on 30 September 2021, when he came on as a substitute in the 68th minute in a friendly 2–0 home win against Liberia. Less than two weeks later, on 11 October, he made his third appearance for Egypt coming on as a substitute in the 26th minute in a 3–0 away win against Libya in the 2022 FIFA World Cup qualification.

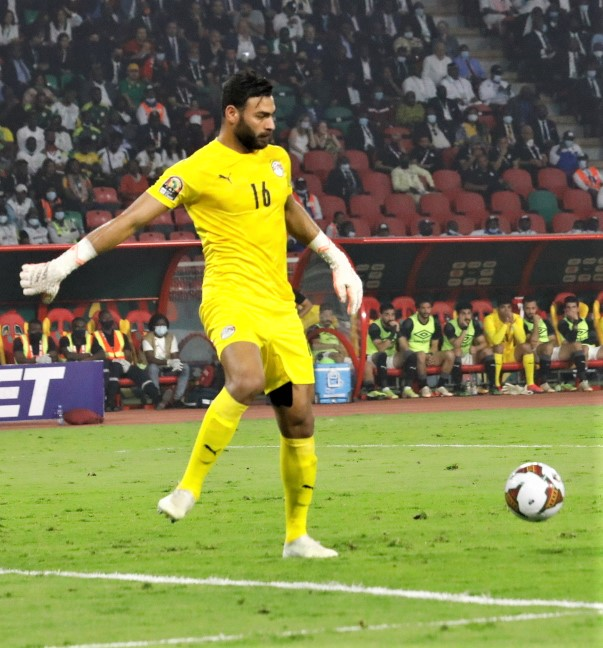
Gabaski with Egypt in 2021 Africa Cup of Nations

Gabaski was included in the Egypt squad for the 2021 Africa Cup of Nations (held in 2022). He was brought on as a substitute in Egypt's round of 16 clash with Ivory Coast. He saved Eric Bailly's penalty, helping Egypt advance. In the quarterfinal against Morocco, Gabaski started the match before being substituted in extra time due to injury. He returned to the starting line-up in the semi-final against hosts Cameroon. The match ended in a 0–0 draw after extra-time; in the ensuing shootout, Gabaski saved two penalties, helping Egypt reach the final. Gabaski then started in the 2021 Africa Cup of Nations Final, where he saved Sadio Mané's penalty and produced a number of impressive saves to keep the game at 0–0 after the end of extra-time. He went on to save another penalty in the subsequent shootout, from Bouna Sarr, but saw teammates Mohamed Abdelmonem and Mohanad Lasheen miss their spot-kicks as Egypt lost 4–2. Nevertheless, he was elected as Man of the Match.

On 30 December 2023, Gabaski was named in the 27-man squad for the 2023 Africa Cup of Nations in Ivory Coast. In the competition's round of 16 match against DR Congo, he missed a decisive penalty during the shootout which ended in a 8–7 defeat, following a 1–1 draw after extra time.

== Personal life ==
On 8 April 2021, Gabaski married Algerian model Samara Yahia who is the 2019 Miss Arab World.

== Career statistics ==
=== Club ===
As of match played 25 December 2021

Appearances and goals by club, season and competition
Club	Season	League			National Cup		Continental		Other		Total	
Club	Season	Division	Apps	Goals	Apps (Note: All appearances in Egypt Cup)	Goals	Apps (Note: All appearances in CAF Champions League)	Goals	Apps	Goals	Apps	Goals
ENPPI	2010–11	Egyptian Premier League	29	0	4	0	—		—		33	0
ENPPI	2011–12	Egyptian Premier League	5	0	0	0	—		—		5	0
ENPPI	2012–13	Egyptian Premier League	0	0	0	0	—		—		0	0
ENPPI	Total		34	0	4	0	0	0	0	0	38	0
Zamalek	2013–14	Egyptian Premier League	1	0	3	0	2	0	—		6	0
Zamalek	2014–15	Egyptian Premier League	11	0	0	0	0	0	0	0	11	0
Zamalek	2015–16	Egyptian Premier League	0	0	0	0	0	0	0	0	0	0
Zamalek	Total		12	0	3	0	2	0	0	0	17	0
Smouha	2016–17	Egyptian Premier League	26	0	3	0	0	0	—		29	0
Smouha	2017–18	Egyptian Premier League	24	0	1	0	—		—		25	0
Smouha	2018–19	Egyptian Premier League	33	0	0	0	—		—		33	0
Smouha	Total		83	0	4	0	0	0	0	0	87	0
Zamalek	2019–20	Egyptian Premier League	20	0	2	0	9	0	2 (Note: One appearance in Egyptian Super Cup, one appearance in CAF Super Cup)	0	33	0
Zamalek	2020–21	Egyptian Premier League	18	0	1	0	1	0	—		20	0
Zamalek	2021–22	Egyptian Premier League	14	0	0	0	7	0	—		21	0
Zamalek	Total		52	0	3	0	17	0	2	0	74	0
Career total			181	0	14	0	19	0	2	0	216	0

=== International ===
As of match played 28 January 2024

Appearances and goals by national team and year
National team	Year	Apps	Goals
Egypt	2011	1	0
Egypt	2021	2	0
Egypt	2022	6	0
Egypt	2023	1	0
Egypt	2024	2	0
Total		12	0

== Honours ==
ENPPI

- Egypt Cup: 2010–11

Zamalek

- Egyptian Premier League: 2014–15, 2020–21, 2021-22
- Egypt Cup: 2014, 2015, 2018–19, 2021
- Egyptian Super Cup: 2019–20
- CAF Super Cup: 2020

Egypt

- Africa Cup of Nations runner-up: 2021
