= Mark Fodya =

Malawian footballer

Personal information
- Date of birth: 22 December 1997 (age 28)
- Place of birth: Malawi
- Position: Left-back

Team information
- Current team: Manica Diamonds

Senior career*
Years	Team	Apps	(Gls)
2017–	Silver Strikers		

International career^{‡}
2020–	Malawi	5	(0)
- * Club domestic league appearances and goals as of 21:47, 23 December 2021 (UTC) ‡ National team caps and goals as of 21:47, 23 December 2021 (UTC)

Mark Fodya (born 22 December 1997) is a Malawian professional footballer who plays as a left-back for the Malawian club Silver Strikers, and the Malawi national team.

== International career ==
Fodya made his international debut with the Malawi national team in a 2–2 2021 COSAFA Cup tie with Zimbabwe on 9 July 2021. He was part of the Malawi squad the 2021 Africa Cup of Nations.
