= Dawda Ngum =

Gambian footballer

Personal information
- Date of birth: 2 September 1990 (age 36)
- Place of birth: Banjul, Gambia
- Position: Midfielder

Senior career*
Years	Team	Apps	(Gls)
2008–2013	BK Olympic		
2013–2014	Trelleborg	35	(0)
2015–2016	Höllviken	32	(1)
2017–2018	Rosengård	17	(0)
2018–2019	Brønshøj	18	(0)
2019	Roskilde	11	(0)
2020–2021	Brønshøj	22	(0)
2022–2023	Ariana FC	40	(1)
2024	Brønshøj		

International career^{‡}
2015–	Gambia	20	(0)
- * Club domestic league appearances and goals as of 14:06, 20 May 2023 (UTC) ‡ National team caps and goals as of 14:06, 20 May 2023 (UTC)

Dawda Ngum (born 2 September 1990) is a Gambian professional footballer who plays as a midfielder for the Gambia national team.

== Club career ==
Born in Banjul, Ngum has played for BK Olympic, Trelleborg, Höllviken, and Rosengård. He signed for Brønshøj in July 2018, and for Roskilde in July 2019. On 10 January 2020, it was confirmed that Ngum had left Roskilde. On 26 February 2020, he returned to Brønshøj. In 2022 he signed for Swedish club Ariana FC.

In February 2024, Ngum returned to Denmark and his former club, Brønshøj.

== International career ==
Ngum made his international debut for Gambia on 9 June 2015, in their 1–1 draw with Uganda.
