= Janine Anthony =

Nigerian sports writer, presenter and analyst (born 20th century)

- Born: Nigeria
- Occupations: Broadcaster; sports journalist; analyst; media personality; editor-in-chief

Janine Anthony (born 20th century) is a Nigerian broadcaster, sport journalist, analyst and media personality.

She is the founder and editor-in-chief of LadiesMarch – a pioneering African network focused on reporting women's soccer across African communities. Anthony was a Sky Sports presenter and was previously a BBC Africa sports presenter and sports team lead at the West Africa bureau. In 2019, she was recorded as the BBC World Service's first African female commentator of the Africa Cup of Nations (2019).

== Career ==
Anthony's early interest in sport was influenced by Super Falcons footballer Mercy Akide-Udoh, which led her to pursue a career in sport writing and broadcasting. Anthony began her career in 2012 as a guest on a sport show on Hot FM, Owerri in Owerri, Imo State.

In 2013, she moved back to Lagos where she freelanced for Nigeria Info FM under the Femi and the Gang show. Her archival knowledge and analysis on the show encouraged her to start a new show, Femi's Divas, which later morphed into LadiesMatch – an all-women sports crew with Anthony featuring as the lead presenter and producer alongside a rotating cast of female sports analysts.

In 2015, Anthony became a sports analyst on Smooth FM's evening sports show before taking on her first television role on NTA's Inside Sports as an analyst alongside Jonathan Hanson, Tega Onojaife, Titus Bankole and Joseph Faulkner.

In 2015, after noticing low media coverage of African women sports, Anthony developed her earlier radio sports show, LadiesMarch, on Nigeria Info FM into an all-women independent organization focused on reporting women's soccer across African communities. The team later expanded to include male writers interested in women's soccer.

Anthony joined Inspiration FM in 2016 as a presenter and co-created sports entertainment show – TimeOut with Debola and Janine. The success of the show led to her nomination for the Outstanding Female Sportscaster for the 2016 Nigerian Broadcasters Merit Awards.

In 2017, she became the first female presenter on the German Bundesliga and Italian Serie A for African rights holders, StarTimes. In 2018, she joined the BBC as a reporter and presenter and was sports team lead West Africa before joining Sky Sports as a presenter. In 2019, she led an all-female BBC crew to the Africa Cup of Nations (AFCON) in Egypt and became the first African woman to lead commentators at a major men's sports competition in Africa.

Anthony was nominated for the 2019 Best Young Reporter at the International Sports Press Awards (AIPS) and in 2020 placed ninth in the AIPS Young Reporters Top 15.

Africa Sports Ventures Group (ASVG) named her one of the 2025 50 Most Influential African Women in Sports in the Business and Marketing category.
