= Jannick Buyla =

Equatoguinean footballer (born 1998)

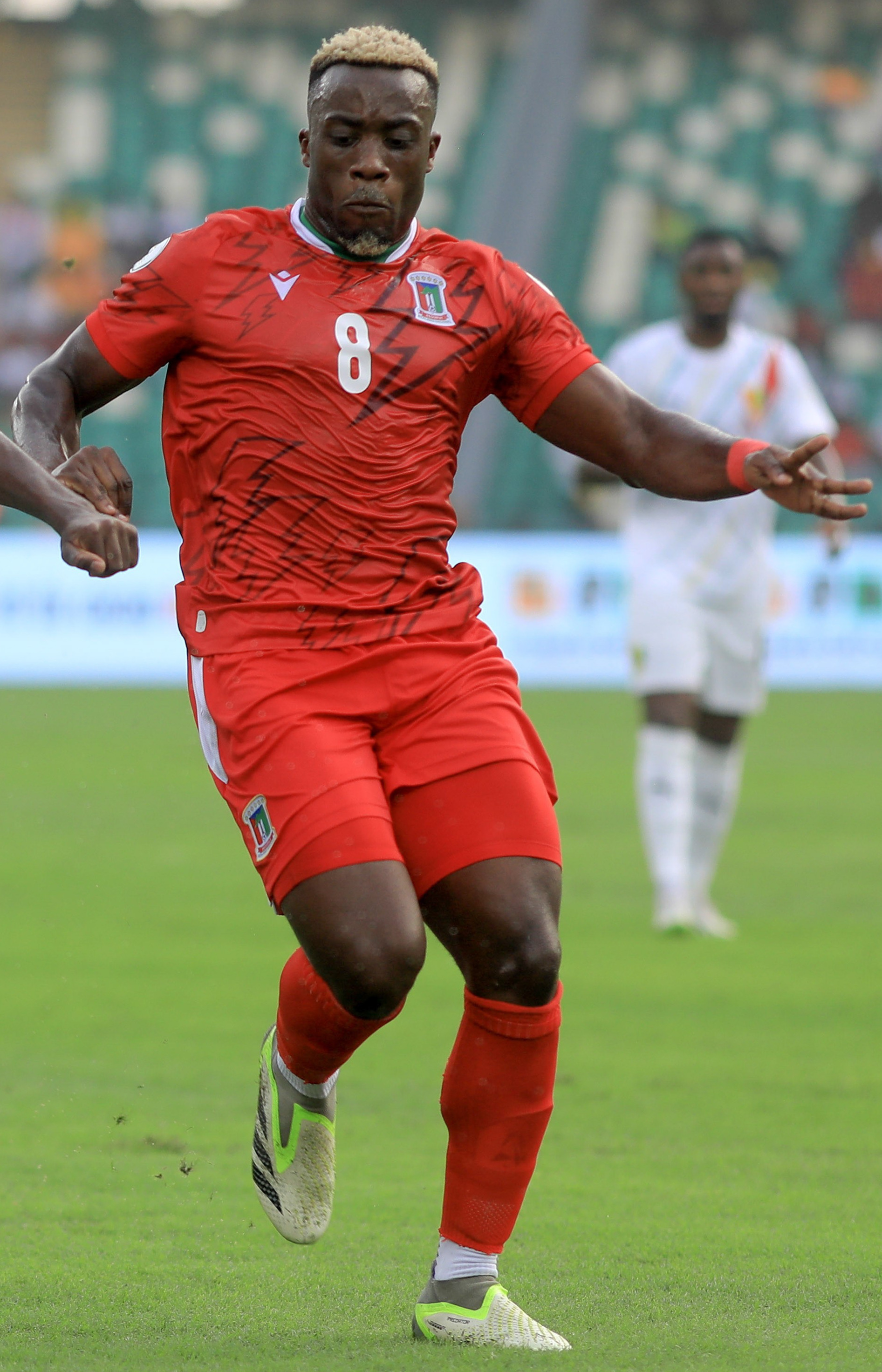
- Buyla with Equatorial Guinea in 2024

Personal information
- Full name: Jannick Buyla Sam
- Date of birth: 6 October 1998 (age 28)
- Place of birth: Zaragoza, Spain
- Height: 1.79 m (5 ft 10 in)
- Position: Midfielder

Team information
- Current team: Lusitano de Évora

Youth career
- 2003–2009: Amistad
- 2009–2010: Oliver
- 2010–2017: Zaragoza

Senior career*
Years	Team	Apps	(Gls)
2017–2020	Zaragoza B	64	(5)
2017–2018	→ Tudelano (loan)	6	(0)
2019–2022	Zaragoza	9	(0)
2021	→ UCAM Murcia (loan)	14	(2)
2021–2022	→ Gimnàstic (loan)	25	(1)
2023	Badajoz	19	(1)
2023–2024	SD Logroñés	7	(0)
2024	Linares	15	(0)
2024–2025	Tarazona	26	(1)
2025–2026	Numancia	25	(1)
2026–	Lusitano de Évora	0	(0)

International career^{‡}
2019–	Equatorial Guinea	34	(3)
- * Club domestic league appearances and goals as of 14 May 2026 ‡ National team caps and goals as of 9 June 2025

Jannick Buyla Sam (born 6 October 1998) is a professional footballer who plays as a midfielder for Portuguese Liga 3 club Lusitano de Évora. Born in Spain, he plays for the Equatorial Guinea national team.

Nicknamed Nick in Spain, Buyla is a former member of the Equatorial Guinea national under-20 team.

== Club career ==
Born in Zaragoza, Aragón to Equatoguinean Bubi parents, Buyla represented UD Amistad, CD Oliver and Real Zaragoza as a youth. On 2 August 2017, after finishing his formation, he was loaned to Segunda División B side CD Tudelano for one year.

Buyla made his senior debut on 24 September 2017, in a 0–0 home draw against CD Lealtad. He returned to Zaragoza on 24 January 2018, being assigned to the B-team, and finished the campaign by suffering relegation.

On 11 May 2019, Buyla made his first team debut by coming on as a late substitute for James Igbekeme in a 3–0 Segunda División away success over Extremadura UD. Roughly one year later, he renewed his contract until 2024 and was definitely promoted to the first team for the 2020–21 season.

On 28 January 2021, after featuring rarely, Buyla was loaned to third division side UCAM Murcia CF for the remainder of the campaign. On 5 July, he moved to Primera División RFEF side Gimnàstic de Tarragona, also on loan.

On 1 September 2022, Zaragoza terminated Buyla's contract.

On 5 January 2023, Buyla joined Primera Federación club CD Badajoz.

Following Badajoz's relegation to the Segunda Federación the previous season, Buyla stayed in the Primera Federación, signing for SD Logroñés on 1 November 2023. He was released on 29 January 2024 following accusations of attempted match fixing with his former club Badajoz last season.

In August 2025, Buyla joined Segunda Federación club Numancia.

== International career ==
Jannick Buyla received his first call-up to the Equatorial Guinea national team on 8 September 2019, in a match against South Sudan. The game, which Equatorial Guinea won 1–0, was part of the 2022 FIFA World Cup qualification campaign. He shared the squad with his Real Zaragoza teammate, Federico Bikoro.

At the beginning of 2022, he was selected by coach Juan Micha to take part in the 2021 Africa Cup of Nations, held in Cameroon. During the tournament, he played in five matches and made a notable impact by scoring a goal against Senegal in the quarter-finals, although his team was eliminated with a 3–1 loss.

In December 2023, he was named by Juan Micha in the 27-man Equatorial Guinea squad for the 2023 Africa Cup of Nations.

== Personal life ==
Buyla is the brother of the footballer Hugo Buyla.

== International goals ==
Scores and results list Equatorial Guinea's goal tally first.

No	Date	Venue	Opponent	Score	Result	Competition
1.	30 January 2022	Ahmadou Ahidjo Stadium, Yaoundé, Cameroon	Senegal	1–1	1–3	2021 Africa Cup of Nations
2.	22 January 2024	Alassane Ouattara Stadium, Abidjan, Ivory Coast	Ivory Coast	4–0	4–0	2023 Africa Cup of Nations
3.	9 September 2024	Estadio de Malabo, Malabo, Equatorial Guinea	Togo	2–1	2–2	2025 Africa Cup of Nations qualification
