= Samuel Gouet =

Cameroonian footballer

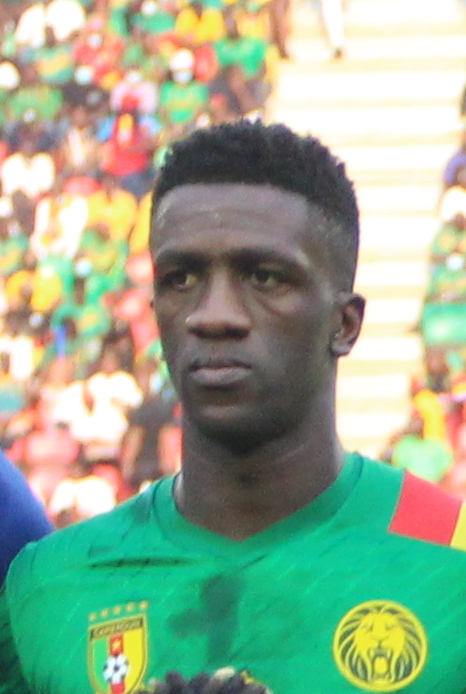
- Gouet with Cameroon at the 2021 Africa Cup of Nations

Personal information
- Full name: Samuel Yves Oum Gwet
- Date of birth: 14 December 1997 (age 28)
- Place of birth: Ayos, Cameroon
- Height: 1.85 m (6 ft 1 in)
- Positions: Defensive midfielder; centre-back

Team information
- Current team: FC Hegelmann
- Number: 10

Youth career
- –2016: APEJES Academy
- 2017: Rheindorf Altach

Senior career*
Years	Team	Apps	(Gls)
2016–2017	APEJES Academy		
2017–2021	Rheindorf Altach	99	(5)
2021–2023	Mechelen	40	(0)
2023–2024	Yverdon-Sport	9	(0)
2024–2025	Politehnica Iași	32	(0)
2026–	Hegelmann	20	(1)

International career^{‡}
2017	Cameroon U20	3	(0)
2019	Cameroon Olympic	3	(0)
2016–	Cameroon	25	(0)
Medal record
Men's football
Representing Cameroon
Africa Cup of Nations
Third place	2021 Cameroon
- * Club domestic league appearances and goals as of 27 July 2026 ‡ National team caps and goals as of 12 September 2023

Samuel Yves Oum Gwet (born 14 December 1997), known as Samuel Gouet, is a Cameroonian professional footballer who plays as a defensive midfielder or a centre-back.

== Club career ==
On 23 June 2021, Gouet signed a three-year contract with Mechelen in Belgium.

On 26 July 2023, Gouet moved to Yverdon-Sport in Switzerland on a two-year contract.

=== Hegelmann ===
On 10 January 2025 Samuel Gouet signed with Lithuanian Hegelmann Club.

== International career ==
On 9 October 2020, Gouet made his international debut for Cameroon in a friendly match against Japan. Gouet was one of the 26 players that are called up for the 2022 FIFA World Cup.

== Career statistics ==
=== International ===
As of match played 12 September 2023

Appearances and goals by national team and year
National team	Year	Apps	Goals
Cameroon	2016	5	0
Cameroon	2020	2	0
Cameroon	2021	5	0
Cameroon	2022	11	0
Cameroon	2023	1	0
Total		25	0

== Honours ==
Mechelen

- Belgian Cup runner-up: 2022–23
- Belgian Super Cup runner-up: 2023
