= Santiago Eneme =

Equatoguinean footballer (born 2000)

Personal information
- Full name: Santiago Eneme Bocari
- Date of birth: 29 September 2000 (age 26)
- Place of birth: Malabo, Equatorial Guinea
- Height: 1.83 m (6 ft 0 in)
- Position: Midfielder

Team information
- Current team: Sparta Prague
- Number: 5

Youth career
- 2015–2018: Cano Sport Academy
- 2019: Nantes

Senior career*
Years	Team	Apps	(Gls)
2018	Cano Sport		
2019–2023	Nantes B	43	(8)
2023–2024	MFK Vyškov	20	(1)
2024–2025	Slovan Liberec	22	(2)
2025–	Sparta Prague	19	(0)

International career^{‡}
2018–	Equatorial Guinea U23	1	(1)
2018–	Equatorial Guinea	21	(0)
- * Club domestic league appearances and goals as of 27 May 2026 ‡ National team caps and goals as of 9 January 2024

Santiago Eneme Bocari (born 29 September 2000) is an Equatoguinean professional footballer who plays as a midfielder for Czech First League club Sparta Prague and the Equatorial Guinea national team.

== Club career ==
Born in Malabo, Eneme has played club football for Cano Sport Academy in Equatorial Guinea and for the Nantes B reserve team in France.

On 14 July 2024, Eneme signed a contract with Czech First League club Slovan Liberec until 2027.

On 27 May 2025, Eneme signed a multi-year contract with Czech First League club Sparta Prague.

== International career ==
Eneme made his international debut for Equatorial Guinea in 2018.

== Personal life ==
Eneme's younger brother, Gustavo Melchor Eneme, is also a footballer. His brother has been already called up to the local-based Equatorial Guinea national team.
