= Farid Ouédraogo =

Burkinabé footballer

Farid Ondongo
Personal information
- Full name: Soufian Farid Ouédraogo
- Date of birth: 26 December 1996 (age 29)
- Place of birth: Ouagadougou, Burkina Faso
- Height: 1.85 m (6 ft 1 in)
- Position: Goalkeeper

Team information
- Current team: Al-Hilal SC
- Number: 1

Senior career*
Years	Team	Apps	(Gls)
2014–2015	Majestic		
2015–2016	RC Kadiogo		
2016–2017	Rahimo		
2017–2020	Majestic		
2020–2022	USFA		
2022–2025	AS Vita Club	14	(0)
2025–	Al-Hilal SC		

International career^{‡}
2021–	Burkina Faso	10	(0)
- * Club domestic league appearances and goals as of 16:01, 11 August 2025 (UTC) ‡ National team caps and goals as of 23:24, 30 March 2024 (UTC)

Soufian Farid Ouédraogo (born 26 December 1996) is a Burkinabé professional footballer who plays as a goalkeeper for AS Vita Club and the Burkina Faso national team.

== International career ==
Ouédraogo was part of the Burkina Faso national team for the 2020 African Nations Championship.
