= Abdou Diallo =

French-Senegalese footballer (born 1996)

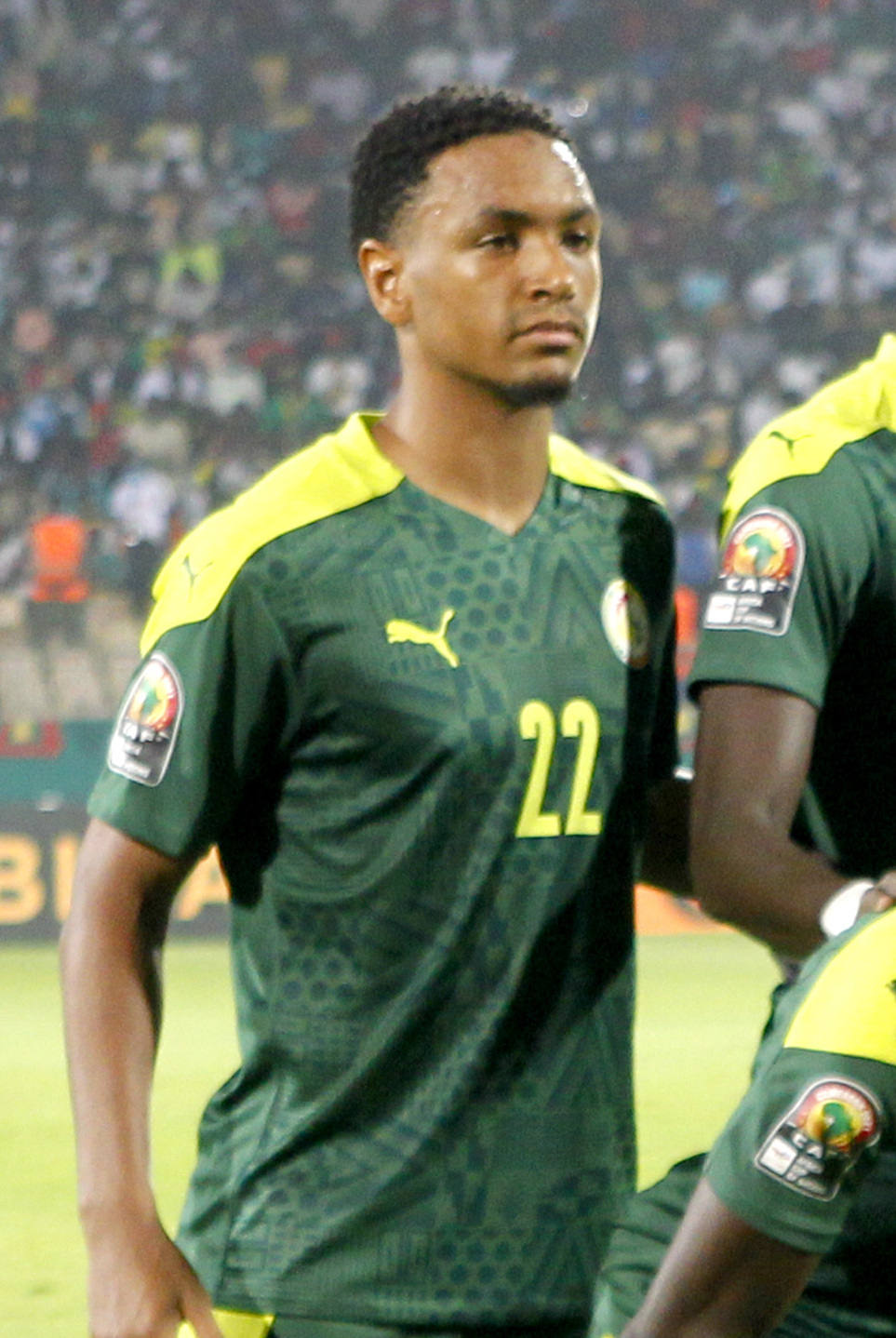
- Diallo in 2022

Personal information
- Full name: Abdou Lakhad Diallo
- Date of birth: 4 May 1996 (age 30)
- Place of birth: Tours, Indre-et-Loire, France
- Height: 1.83 m (6 ft 0 in)
- Position: Centre-back

Youth career
- 2002–2003: OC Saint-Herblain
- 2003–2004: Grand Font
- 2004–2005: AS Angoulême-Charente 92
- 2005–2007: Angoulême Charente
- 2007–2009: Tours
- 2009–2011: US Chambray-les-Tours
- 2011–2014: Monaco

Senior career*
Years	Team	Apps	(Gls)
2013–2015	Monaco B	29	(0)
2014–2017	Monaco	10	(0)
2015–2016	→ Zulte Waregem (loan)	33	(3)
2017–2018	Mainz 05	27	(2)
2018–2019	Borussia Dortmund	28	(1)
2019–2023	Paris Saint-Germain	50	(0)
2022–2023	→ RB Leipzig (loan)	8	(1)
2023–2026	Al-Arabi	44	(1)
2025–2026	→ Al-Duhail (loan)	0	(0)
2026	→ Umm Salal (loan)	9	(0)
2026–	Abha	4	(0)

International career^{‡}
2011–2012	France U16	13	(0)
2012–2013	France U17	8	(0)
2013–2014	France U18	4	(0)
2014–2015	France U19	16	(1)
2016	France U20	4	(2)
2016–2019	France U21	16	(0)
2021–2025	Senegal	33	(2)
Medal record
Men's football
Representing Senegal
Africa Cup of Nations
Winner	2021
- * Club domestic league appearances and goals as of 14:50, 2 September 2026 (UTC) ‡ National team caps and goals as of 23:00, 6 June 2025 (UTC)

Abdou Lakhad Diallo (born 4 May 1996) is a professional footballer who plays as a centre-back at Saudi Pro League club Abha.

Born in France, Diallo played for the Senegal national team from 2021 to 2025. He was a part of the Senegalese squad that won the 2021 Africa Cup of Nations.

== Early life ==
Abdou Lakhad Diallo was born on 4 May 1996 in the city of Tours, which is the prefecture of the department of Indre-et-Loire.

== Club career ==
=== Monaco ===
Diallo joined the youth academy of Monaco at the age of 15. On 28 March 2014, he signed his first professional contract with the club. Vice-president of the club, Vadim Vasilyev commented that Diallo "fits perfectly into our sports project. He has a lot of talent and we hope that he will continue to progress alongside the great players of AS Monaco". On 14 December, he made his first team debut, coming on as a substitute for Bernardo Silva in the extra time of a 1–0 league victory against Marseille.

In June 2015, Diallo was loaned out to Belgian club Zulte Waregem for the 2015–16 season. During his stint at the club, he was deployed at an attacking role, scoring three goals in 33 league matches. In December 2016, media reports emerged that Spanish club Real Betis was interested in signing him. Nevertheless, he made five league appearances during the 2016–17 season, with his side winning the league.

=== Mainz 05 ===
On 14 July 2017, Diallo moved to Bundesliga club Mainz 05, and signed a five-year contract. On 9 September, he scored his first goal for the club in a 3–1 league victory against Bayer Leverkusen. During the season, he was deployed at both back three and back four; and had an 80% pass success rate. He started in 27 league matches during the season.

=== Borussia Dortmund ===
On 26 June 2018, Diallo joined Borussia Dortmund on a five-year deal for a fee of €28 million. In an interview, he said that Ousmane Dembélé advised him to join the club. On 15 September, he scored his first goal for the club in a 3–1 league victory against Eintracht Frankfurt.

=== Paris Saint-Germain ===
On 16 July 2019, Diallo signed for Paris Saint-Germain (PSG) until June 2024. The transfer fee of his deal to the French club was of €32 million.

On 3 August 2019, Diallo made his debut for Paris Saint-Germain in the Trophée des Champions, which ended as a 2–1 win for PSG over Rennes. He made his league debut against Nîmes, in a 3–0 home win on 11 August. Diallo's UEFA Champions League debut came on 18 September, in a 3–0 win against Real Madrid. At the end of the 2019–20 season, he received a Ligue 1 winners medal for his contributions that season, which was ended early (on 30 April 2020) due to the COVID-19 pandemic.

==== Loan to RB Leipzig ====
On 1 September 2022, Diallo completed a return to Germany, signing for Bundesliga club RB Leipzig on a season-long loan with an option-to-buy for a reported fee of €25 million.

=== Al-Arabi ===
On 15 August 2023, Diallo signed for Qatar Stars League club Al-Arabi for a transfer fee in the region of €15 million. He joined the club on a four-year contract.

==== Loan to Al-Duhail ====
On 8 September 2025, Diallo signed, signing for Al-Duhail on a season-long loan.

==== Loan to Umm Salal ====
On 16 January 2026, Diallo signed, signing for Umm Salal on a season-long loan.

== International career ==
Diallo was born in France and is Senegalese by descent. He played for many youth teams of France, and even captained France's under-21s.

On 17 March 2021, Diallo was called up to the Senegal national team for the first time. He made his debut in a 0–0 draw against Congo on 26 March.

He was part of Senegal's squad for the 2021 Africa Cup of Nations; the Lions of Teranga went on to win the tournament for the first time in their history. Diallo was appointed a Grand Officer of the National Order of the Lion by President of Senegal Macky Sall following the nation's victory at the tournament.

Diallo played in all four of Senegal's matches at the 2022 FIFA World Cup as the nation reached the round of 16 for the first time since its debut in 2002.

In December 2023, he was named in Senegal's squad for the postponed 2023 Africa Cup of Nations held in the Ivory Coast.

== Style of play ==
Diallo plays as a central defender. Mainz 05 sporting director Rouven Schröder has said that Diallo is "strong in the air and shrewd in the challenge". Michael Zorc, the sporting director of Borussia Dortmund, described Diallo as "a modern, strong central defender who is very intelligent. He can play a wider defensive role too or even be deployed in a defensive midfield role".

== Personal life ==
Diallo's younger brother, Ibrahima, is also a footballer.

== Career statistics ==
=== Club ===
As of match played 28 April 2024

Appearances and goals by club, season and competition
Club	Season	League			National cup		League cup		Continental		Other		Total	
Club	Season	Division	Apps	Goals	Apps	Goals	Apps	Goals	Apps	Goals	Apps	Goals	Apps	Goals
Monaco B	2013–14	CFA	18	0	—		—		—		—		18	0
Monaco B	2014–15	CFA	11	0	—		—		—		—		11	0
Monaco B	Total		29	0	—		—		—		—		29	0
Monaco	2014–15	Ligue 1	5	0	1	0	2	0	0	0	—		8	0
Monaco	2016–17	Ligue 1	5	0	4	0	1	0	1	0	—		11	0
Monaco	Total		10	0	5	0	3	0	1	0	—		19	0
Zulte Waregem (loan)	2015–16	Belgian Pro League	33	3	2	0	—		—		—		35	3
Mainz 05	2017–18	Bundesliga	27	2	3	1	—		—		—		30	3
Borussia Dortmund	2018–19	Bundesliga	28	1	3	0	—		7	0	—		38	1
Paris Saint-Germain	2019–20	Ligue 1	16	0	1	0	2	0	3	0	1 (Note: Appearance in Trophée des Champions)	0	23	0
Paris Saint-Germain	2020–21	Ligue 1	22	0	5	0	—		8	0	1	0	36	0
Paris Saint-Germain	2021–22	Ligue 1	12	0	1	0	—		2	0	1	0	16	0
Paris Saint-Germain	Total		50	0	7	0	2	0	13	0	3	0	75	0
RB Leipzig (loan)	2022–23	Bundesliga	8	1	2	0	—		5	0	—		15	1
Al-Arabi	2023–24	Qatar Stars League	20	1	2	1	1	0	1	0	—		24	2
Career total			205	8	24	2	6	0	27	0	3	0	266	10

=== International ===
As of match played 6 June 2025

Appearances and goals by national team and year
National team	Year	Apps	Goals
Senegal	2021	7	1
Senegal	2022	15	1
Senegal	2023	4	0
Senegal	2024	6	0
Senegal	2025	1	0
Total		33	2

Scores and results list Senegal's goal tally first. Score column indicates score after each Diallo goal.

List of international goals scored by Abdou Diallo
No.	Date	Venue	Opponent	Score	Result	Competition
1.	1 September 2021	Stade Lat-Dior, Thiès, Senegal	Togo	2–0	2–0	2022 FIFA World Cup qualification
2.	2 February 2022	Stade Ahmadou Ahidjo, Yaoundé, Cameroon	Burkina Faso	1–0	3–1	2021 Africa Cup of Nations

== Honours ==
Monaco

- Ligue 1: 2016–17

Paris Saint-Germain

- Ligue 1: 2019–20, 2021–22
- Coupe de France: 2019–20, 2020–21
- Coupe de la Ligue: 2019–20
- Trophée des Champions: 2019, 2020, 2022
- UEFA Champions League runner-up: 2019–20

RB Leipzig

- DFB-Pokal: 2022–23

Senegal

- Africa Cup of Nations: 2021

Individual

- Grand Officer of the National Order of the Lion: 2022
