= Hervé Koffi =

Burkinabé footballer

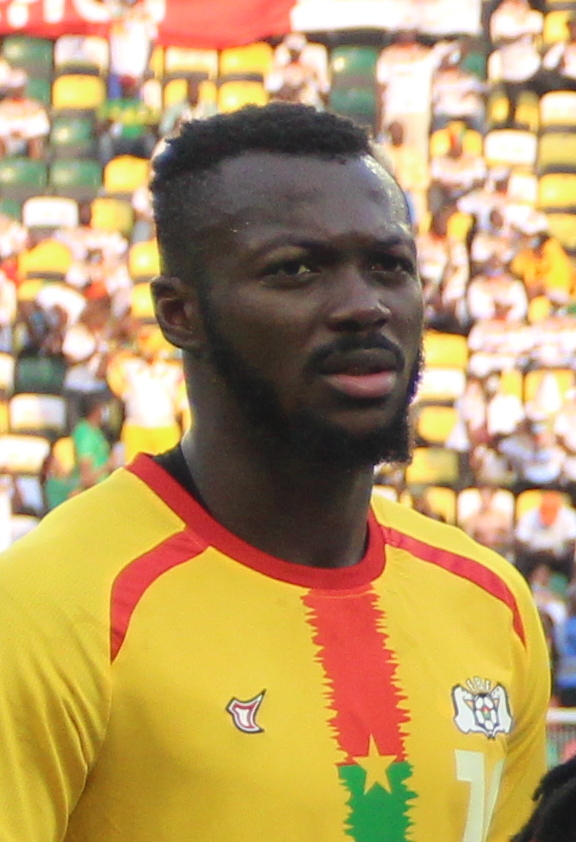
- Koffi in 2022

Personal information
- Full name: Kouakou Hervé Koffi
- Date of birth: 16 October 1996 (age 30)
- Place of birth: Bobo-Dioulasso, Burkina Faso
- Height: 1.84 m (6 ft 0 in)
- Position: Goalkeeper

Team information
- Current team: Union SG (on loan from Lens)
- Number: 12

Youth career
- Rahimo FC

Senior career*
Years	Team	Apps	(Gls)
- ASF Bobo Dioulasso
- RC Bobo Dioulasso
2015–2017	ASEC Mimosas		
2017–2021	Lille	4	(0)
2019–2020	→ Belenenses SAD (loan)	20	(0)
2020–2021	→ Mouscron (loan)	34	(0)
2021–2024	Charleroi	92	(0)
2024–	Lens	5	(0)
2025	Lens II	2	(0)
2025–2026	→ Angers (loan)	30	(0)
2026–	→ Union SG (loan)	8	(0)

International career^{‡}
2015	Burkina Faso U23		
2016–	Burkina Faso	76	(0)
Medal record
Representing Burkina Faso
African Games
Silver medal – second place	2015 Congo
Africa Cup of Nations
Third place	2017 Gabon
- * Club domestic league appearances and goals as of 25 October 2026 ‡ National team caps and goals as of 28 September 2026

Kouakou Hervé Koffi (born 16 October 1996) is a Burkinabé professional footballer who plays as a goalkeeper for Belgian Pro League club Union SG, on loan from Ligue 1 club Lens, and the Burkina Faso national team.

== Club career ==
Koffi joined ASEC Mimosas of Abidjan in November 2015.

On 21 June 2017, Koffi joined Lille on a five-year deal. He made his debut for Lille in a 2–0 Ligue 1 loss to Caen on 20 August 2017.

In the 2019–20 season, Koffi moved to Belenenses SAD on loan, where he played 20 league games despite suffering some minor injuries. The following season, he joined Lille's partner club Mouscron on another loan, where he replaced Jean Butez who had left for Antwerp.

On 6 July 2021, Koffi joined Charleroi in Belgium on a three-year contract.

For the 2025–26 season, Koffi was loaned by Angers. On 1 August 2026, he moved on a new loan to Union SG in Belgium, with an option to buy.

== International career ==
In 2015, Koffi represented the Burkina Faso national team at the African Games football tournament. In 2017, he represented Burkina Faso in the Africa Cup of Nations. Koffi also featured in the 2021 AFCON tournament in Cameroon.

== Personal life ==
He is the son of former Burkinabe international footballer Hyacinthe Koffi who played in the 2000 African Cup of Nations qualification campaign.

== Career statistics ==
=== Club ===
As of match played 25 October 2026

Appearances and goals by club, season and competition
Club	Season	League			National Cup		League Cup		Europe		Total	
Club	Season	Division	Apps	Goals	Apps	Goals	Apps	Goals	Apps	Goals	Apps	Goals
Lille	2017–18	Ligue 1	4	0	1	0	1	0	—		6	0
Lille B	2017–18	CFA	2	0	—		—		—		2	0
Lille B	2018–19	CFA	8	0	—		—		—		8	0
Lille B	Total		10	0	—		—		—		10	0
Belenenses SAD (loan)	2019–20	Primeira Liga	20	0	0	0	0	0	—		20	0
Mouscron (loan)	2020–21	Belgian Pro League	34	0	0	0	—		—		34	0
Charleroi	2021–22	Belgian Pro League	32	0	1	0	—		—		33	0
Charleroi	2022–23	Belgian Pro League	28	0	1	0	—		—		29	0
Charleroi	2023–24	Belgian Pro League	32	0	2	0	—		—		34	0
Charleroi	Total		92	0	4	0	—		—		96	0
Lens	2024–25	Ligue 1	5	0	1	0	—		0	0	6	0
Lens	2026–27	Ligue 1	0	0	0	0	0	0	0	0	0	0
Lens	Total		5	0	1	0	0	0	0	0	6	0
Lens B	2024–25	CFA 2	2	0	—		—		—		2	0
Angers (loan)	2025–26	Ligue 1	30	0	0	0	—		—		30	0
Union Saint-Gilloise (loan)	2026–27	Belgian Pro League	8	0	0	0	3 (Note: Appearances in UEFA Europa League)	0	—		11	0
Career total			205	0	6	0	4	0	0	0	215	0

=== International ===
As of match played 28 September 2026

Appearances and goals by national team and year
National team	Year	Apps	Goals
Burkina Faso	2016	3	0
Burkina Faso	2017	12	0
Burkina Faso	2018	7	0
Burkina Faso	2019	4	0
Burkina Faso	2020	2	0
Burkina Faso	2021	10	0
Burkina Faso	2022	10	0
Burkina Faso	2023	6	0
Burkina Faso	2024	6	0
Burkina Faso	2025	11	0
Burkina Faso	2026	5	0
Total		76	0

== Honours ==
Burkina Faso

- Africa Cup of Nations third place: 2017
