= Ismahila Ouédraogo =

Burkinabé footballer (born 1999)

Personal information
- Full name: Wandepanga Ismahila Ouédraogo
- Date of birth: 5 November 1999 (age 27)
- Place of birth: Ouagadougou, Burkina Faso
- Height: 1.69 m (5 ft 7 in)
- Position: Midfielder

Team information
- Current team: OB
- Number: 22

Senior career*
Years	Team	Apps	(Gls)
2015–2018	KOZAF		
2018–2021	AS Douanes		
2021–2024	PAOK B	39	(0)
2022	→ Volos (loan)	1	(0)
2023–2024	→ Panserraikos (loan)	24	(0)
2024–2025	Atromitos	31	(0)
2025–	OB	25	(1)

International career^{‡}
2019–	Burkina Faso	19	(0)
- * Club domestic league appearances and goals as of 19 May 2026 ‡ National team caps and goals as of 20:30, 30 January 2024 (UTC)

Wandepanga Ismahila Ouédraogo (born 5 November 1999) is a Burkinabé professional footballer who plays as a midfielder for Odense Boldklub and the Burkina Faso national team.

== Club career ==
Ismahila Ouedraogo came to PAOK to play as a midfielder. Hailing from Burkina Faso, the 22-year-old defensive midfielder is an international with the men's national team of his homeland.He has three caps. He plays as a defensive midfielder and is noted for being active on the field.

On 11 August 2023, he joined Panserraikos on a season-long loan. The following season Ismahila signed a three-year contract with Atromitos in a co-ownership deal with PAOK, being a personal choice of Pablo García.

On 26 August 2025, Ouédraogo joined Danish Superliga club Odense Boldklub on contract until 30. June 2029.

== International career ==
Ouédraogo debuted for the Burkina Faso national team in a 1–0 2020 African Nations Championship qualification win over Ghana on 22 September 2019.

== Career statistics ==
As of 24 August 2024

Club	Season	League			Cup		Continental		Other		Total	
Club	Season	Division	Apps	Goals	Apps	Goals	Apps	Goals	Apps	Goals	Apps	Goals
PAOK B	2021–22	Superleague Greece 2	19	0	—		—		—		19	0
PAOK B	2022–23	Superleague Greece 2	20	0	—		—		—		20	0
PAOK B	Total		39	0	—		—		—		39	0
Volos (loan)	2021–22	Superleague Greece	1	0	—		—		—		1	0
Panserraikos (loan)	2023–24	Superleague Greece	24	0	1	0	—		—		25	0
Atromitos	2024–25	Superleague Greece	30	0	2	0	—		—		32	0
Atromitos	2025–26	Superleague Greece	1	0	—		—		—		1	0
Atromitos	Total		31	0	2	0	—		—		33	0
Career total			95	0	3	0	0	0	0	0	98	0
