= Soumaïla Ouattara =

Burkinabé footballer (born 1995)

Personal information
- Full name: Soumaïla Ouattara
- Date of birth: 4 July 1995 (age 31)
- Place of birth: Bobo-Dioulasso, Burkina Faso
- Height: 1.82 m (6 ft 0 in)
- Position: Centre-back

Senior career*
| Years | Team | Apps | (Gls) |
| 2014–2015 | ASF Bobo Dioulasso | | |
| 2015–2016 | SOA | | |
| 2016–2017 | Rahimo | | |
| 2017–2018 | Ajax Cape Town | 2 | (0) |
| 2018–2021 | Rahimo | | |
| 2021 | Raja Casablanca | 8 | (0) |
| 2021–2022 | FUS Rabat | 17 | (1) |
| 2022–2024 | Hobro IK | 14 | (0) |
| 2025 | Al-Hudood | | |

International career
| 2019–2022 | Burkina Faso | 10 | (0) |
- * Club domestic league appearances and goals

Soumaïla Ouattara (born 4 July 1995) is a Burkinabé professional footballer who plays as a centre-back.

== Club career ==
Ouattara began his career at ASF Bobo Dioulasso in 2014 in Burkina Faso. In 2015, he signed for Ivorian club SOA before returning to Burkina Faso with Rahimo a year later. In 2017, he moved to Ajax Cape Town. Over the course of one season at the club, he played a total of two matches. His debut match was a 2–1 loss to Maritzburg United on 5 January 2018, and his final match was a 1–0 loss to Cape Town City fifteen days later. At the end of the 2017–18 campaign, Ajax suffered relegation after being sanctioned for fielding an ineligible player. In the summer of 2018, Ouattara returned to his former club of Rahimo.

On 5 February 2021, Ouattara signed for Moroccan club Raja Casablanca on a contract lasting until 2024. The transfer fee was reportedly worth 16 million CFA francs. His debut came in a 1–0 loss to Hassania Agadir on 7 April 2021.

On 29 August 2021, Ouattara signed for fellow Moroccan club FUS Rabat. On 29 April 2025, he joined Iraq Stars League club Al-Hudood.

== International career ==
Ouattara made his debut for Burkina Faso in a 1–0 friendly victory over Libya on 4 September 2019. His first competitive match was a 1–0 loss to Mali in the African Nations Championship on 16 January 2021.

== Style of play ==
Ouattara has been described as a player who is equally comfortable with both of his feet.

== Career statistics ==
=== International ===
As of match played 24 March 2023

Appearances and goals by national team and year
| National team | Year | Apps | Goals |
|---|---|---|---|
| Burkina Faso | 2019 | 1 | 0 |
| Burkina Faso | 2020 | 0 | 0 |
| Burkina Faso | 2021 | 4 | 0 |
| Burkina Faso | 2022 | 5 | 0 |
| Total | | 10 | 0 |

== Honours ==
Rahimo

- Burkinabé Premier League: 2018–19
- Coupe du Faso: 2019
- Burkinabé SuperCup: 2020
