= Mohanad Lasheen =

Egyptian footballer (born 1996)

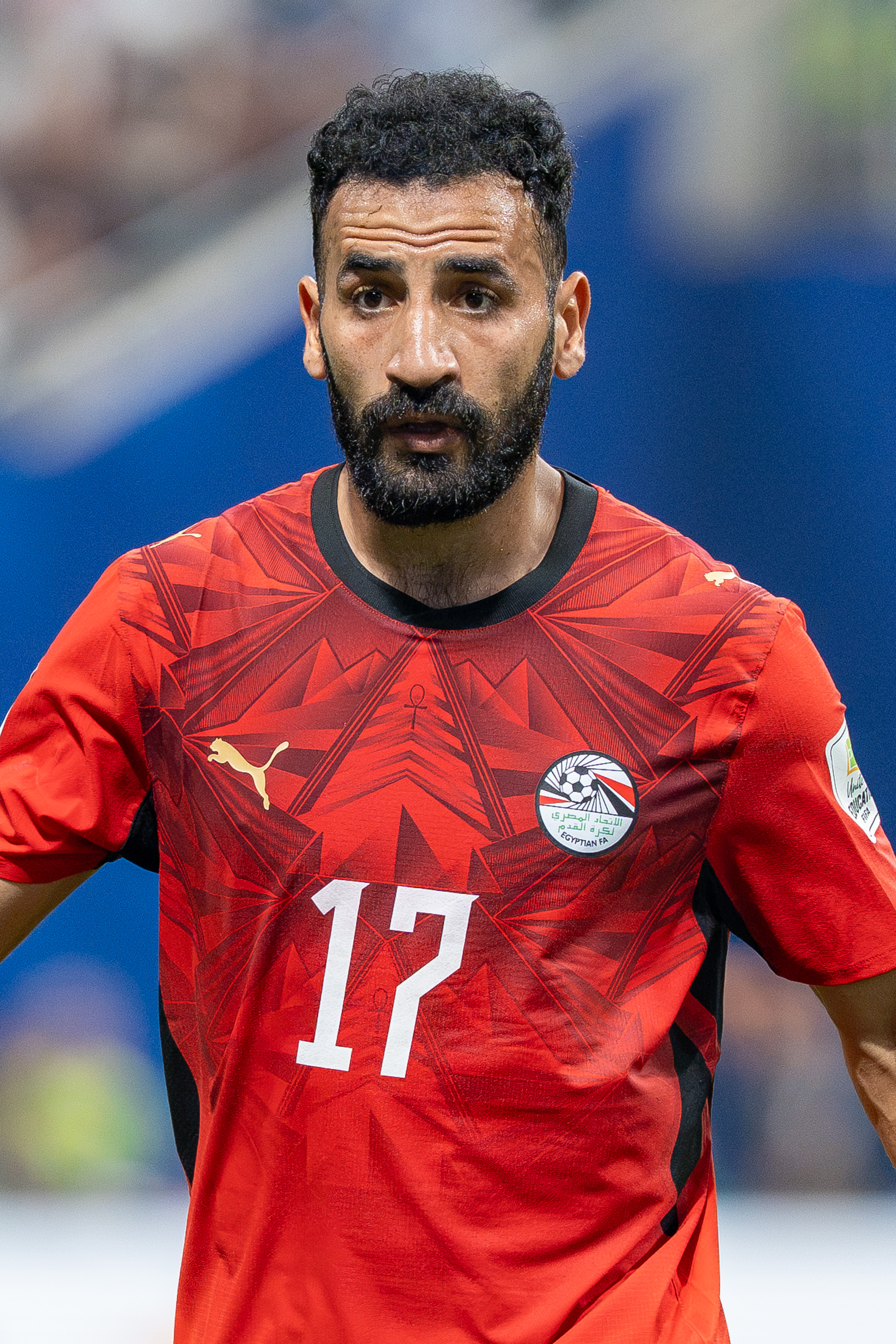
- Lasheen with Egypt in 2026

Personal information
- Full name: Mohanad Mostafa Ahmed Abdelmonem Lasheen
- Date of birth: 29 May 1996 (age 30)
- Place of birth: Cairo, Egypt
- Height: 1.79 m (5 ft 10 in)
- Position: Defensive midfielder

Team information
- Current team: Pyramids
- Number: 22

Youth career
- Ismaily

Senior career*
Years	Team	Apps	(Gls)
2013–2016	Ismaily		
2016–2019	Pyramids	7	(1)
2019–2022	Tala'ea El Gaish	80	(1)
2022–2023	Modern Future	27	(1)
2023–	Pyramids	71	(0)

International career^{‡}
2021–	Egypt	27	(0)
Medal record
Representing Egypt
Men's football
Africa Cup of Nations
Runner-up	2021 Cameroon
- * Club domestic league appearances and goals as of June 7, 2026 ‡ National team caps and goals as of July 7, 2026

Mohanad Mostafa Ahmed Abdelmonem Lasheen (Note: Arabic: مهند مصطفى أحمد عبد المنعم لاشين) (born 29 May 1996) is an Egyptian professional footballer who plays as a defensive midfielder for Egyptian Premier League club Pyramids and the Egypt national team.

== Career ==
In March 2016, Mostafa was promoted from youth team to first team in Ismaily, but he moved six month later to Alassiouty (now is called pyramids) Sport in the Egyptian Second Division and signed a 2-year contract. Mostafa was part of the Alassiouty's (now is called pyramids) squad that promoted to 2017–18 Egyptian Premier League, he also scored the winning goal in the match that guaranteed the promotion for the club before 5 weeks from the end of the season. In April 2017, Ismaily SC made negotiations with Alassiouty (now is called pyramids) to sign the player.

== International career ==
On 2 December 2025, Lasheen was called up to the Egypt squad for the 2025 Africa Cup of Nations.

On 20 May 2026, he was named in the 26-man squad for the 2026 FIFA World Cup.

== Honours ==
Future

- EFA League Cup: 2022

Pyramids

- Egypt Cup: 2023–24
- CAF Champions League: 2024–25
- CAF Super Cup: 2025
- FIFA African–Asian–Pacific Cup: 2025
