= Mohamed Abdelmonem =

Egyptian footballer (born 1999)

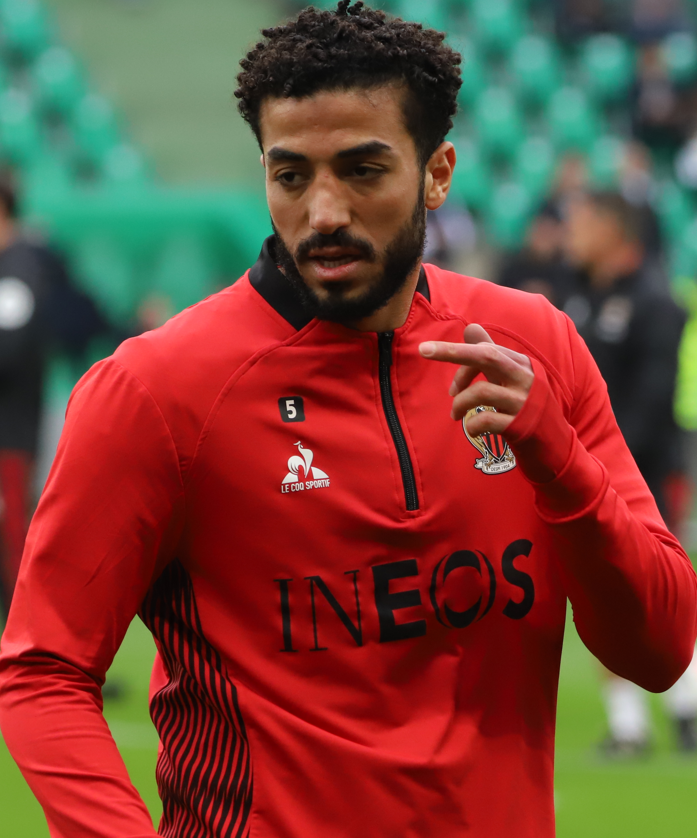
- Abdelmonem with Nice in 2025

Personal information
- Full name: Mohamed Abdelmonem El-Sayed Mohamed Ahmed
- Date of birth: 1 February 1999 (age 27)
- Place of birth: Zagazig, Sharqia, Egypt
- Height: 1.84 m (6 ft 0 in)
- Position: Centre-back

Team information
- Current team: Nice
- Number: 5

Youth career
- 2009–2020: Al Ahly

Senior career*
Years	Team	Apps	(Gls)
2018–2024	Al Ahly	59	(4)
2020–2021	→ Smouha (loan)	32	(2)
2021–2022	→ Future (loan)	7	(0)
2024–	OGC Nice	28	(0)

International career^{‡}
2021	Egypt U23	1	(0)
2021–	Egypt	38	(3)
Medal record
Representing Egypt
Men's football
Africa Cup of Nations
Runner-up	2021 Cameroon
- * Club domestic league appearances and goals as of 18 October 2026 ‡ National team caps and goals as of 27 June 2026

Mohamed Abdelmonem El-Sayed Mohamed Ahmed (Arabic: محمد عبد المنعم السيد محمد أحمد; born 1 February 1999) is an Egyptian professional footballer who plays as a centre-back for Ligue 1 club Nice and the Egypt national team.

== Club career ==
Abdelmonem started his career at Al Ahly, where he achieved several local and continental trophies. He scored a crucial equalizer against Wydad AC in the 2023 CAF Champions League final second leg which helped his team winning the title by 3–2 on aggregate. Furthermore, he was loaned out to Smouha and Future.

On 29 August 2024, Abdelmonem joined Ligue 1 side Nice by signing a contract until 2028. A few days later, on 1 September, he made his debut as a substitute in a 4–1 away win over Angers. On 25 April 2025, he sustained an ACL injury during a 3–1 away win over Paris Saint-Germain, which would sideline him for several months.

== International career ==
Abdelmonem represented Egypt in 2021, and 2023 Africa Cup of Nations.

On 20 May 2026, he was named in the 26-man squad for the 2026 FIFA World Cup.

== Career statistics ==
=== Club ===
As of match played 18 October 2026

Appearances and goals by club, season and competition
Club	Season	League			Cup		Continental		Other		Total	
Club	Season	Division	Apps	Goals	Apps	Goals	Apps	Goals	Apps	Goals	Apps	Goals
Al Ahly	2017–18	Egyptian Premier League	0	0	0	0	0	0	0	0	0	0
Al Ahly	2021–22	Egyptian Premier League	15	0	3	1	8	1	1	0	27	2
Al Ahly	2022–23	Egyptian Premier League	21	0	2	0	14 (Note: Appearances in CAF Champions League)	4	1 (Note: Appearance in Egyptian Super Cup)	0	38	4
Al Ahly	2023–24	Egyptian Premier League	23	1	0	0	13 (Note: Twelve appearances and one goal in CAF Champions League, one appearance in CAF Super Cup)	1	2	0	38	5
Al Ahly	Total		59	1	3	0	35	6	4	0	101	10
Smouha (loan)	2019–20	Egyptian Premier League	8	1	1	0	0	0	0	0	9	1
Smouha (loan)	2020–21	Egyptian Premier League	24	1	0	0	0	0	0	0	24	1
Smouha (loan)	Total		32	2	1	0	0	0	0	0	33	2
Future (loan)	2021–22	Egyptian Premier League	7	0	0	0	0	0	0	0	7	0
Nice	2024–25	Ligue 1	12	0	2	0	4 (Note: Appearances in UEFA Europa League)	0	—		18	0
Nice	2026–27	Ligue 1	7	0	0	0	—		—		7	0
Nice	Total		19	0	2	0	4	0	—		25	0
Career total			132	3	9	1	47	7	5	0	193	14

=== International ===
As of match played 27 June 2026

Appearances and goals by national team and year
National team	Year	Apps	Goals
Egypt	2021	2	0
Egypt	2022	7	2
Egypt	2023	8	0
Egypt	2024	11	1
Egypt	2025	2	0
Egypt	2026	5	0
Total		38	3

Scores and results list Egypt's goal tally first, score column indicates score after each Abdelmonem goal.

List of international goals scored by Mohamed Abdelmonem
No.	Date	Venue	Opponent	Score	Result	Competition
1	19 January 2022	Stade Ahmadou Ahidjo, Yaoundé, Cameroon	Sudan	1–0	1–0	2021 Africa Cup Of Nations
2	27 September 2022	Borg El Arab Stadium, Alexandria, Egypt	Liberia	2–0	3–0	Friendly
3	26 March 2024	New Administrative Capital Stadium, New Administrative Capital, Egypt	Croatia	2–4	2–4	2024 FIFA Series

== Honours ==
Al Ahly

- Egyptian Premier League: 2022–23, 2023–24
- Egypt Cup: 2021–22, 2022–23
- Egyptian Super Cup: 2021–22, 2022–23, 2023–24
- CAF Champions League: 2022–23, 2023–24

Awards

- Africa Cup of Nations Dream Team: 2021
