= 2023 Africa Cup of Nations Group E =

Football tournament group stage

Group E of the 2023 Africa Cup of Nations took place from 16 to 24 January 2024. The group consisted of Tunisia, Mali, South Africa, and Namibia.

Mali and South Africa as the top two teams, along with Namibia as one of the four best third-placed teams, advanced to the round of 16.

== Teams ==
Draw position	Team	Zone	Method of qualification	Date of qualification	Finals appearance	Last appearance	Previous best performance	FIFA Rankings	
Draw position	Team	Zone	Method of qualification	Date of qualification	Finals appearance	Last appearance	Previous best performance	October 2023 (Note: The rankings of October 2023 were used for seeding for the final draw.)	December 2023
E1	Tunisia	UNAF	Group J winners	28 March 2023	21st	2021	Winners (2004)	29	28
E2	Mali	WAFU	Group G winners	18 June 2023	13th	2021	Runners-up (1972)	49	51
E3	South Africa	COSAFA	Group K runners-up	28 March 2023	11th	2019	Winners (1996)	65	66
E4	Namibia	COSAFA	Group E runners-up	12 September 2023	4th	2019	Group stage (1998, 2008, 2019)	114	115

== Standings ==
Pos	Team	Pld	W	D	L	GF	GA	GD	Pts	Qualification
1	Mali	3	1	2	0	3	1	+2	5	Advance to knockout stage
2	South Africa	3	1	1	1	4	2	+2	4 (Note: Head-to-head points: South Africa 3, Namibia 0.)	Advance to knockout stage
3	Namibia	3	1	1	1	1	4	−3	4	Advance to knockout stage
4	Tunisia	3	0	2	1	1	2	−1	2	

Source: CAF
Rules for classification: Group stage tiebreakers

== Matches ==
All times are local, GMT (UTC±0).

=== Tunisia vs Namibia ===
Tunisia and Namibia met for only the fourth time, and the first since 2007, while the previous two meetings came in 1997, as both nations were drawn into Group 2 of the 1998 FIFA World Cup qualification; Tunisia won the previous three meetings, including the first two, which proved key for Tunisia qualifying for the 1998 FIFA World Cup, which was at the time only its second successful qualification campaign.

Tunisia was the better team on paper but was forced to work hard to overcome consistent Namibian pressure, while Tunisia failed to make an impact despite their efforts. With two minutes of normal time remaining, the Namibians punished costly Tunisian misses. From Bethuel Muzeu's clinical delivery, Deon Hotto headed home past Bechir Ben Saïd to secure a shock win for Namibia.

The victory was Namibia's first at an Africa Cup of Nations and only the third time they had avoided defeat in a group-stage match. The previous two were a 1–1 draw in its group stage finale of the 2008 Africa Cup of Nations against Guinea on 28 January 2008, in Sekondi-Takoradi, Ghana, and a 3–3 draw in only its second match at an Africa Cup of Nations, which came on 12 February 1998 in Bobo-Dioulasso, Burkina Faso, when Namibia led 2–0 and 3–1 against Angola, only to finish 3–3.

16 January 2024
17:00

Tunisia	0–1	Namibia
	Report	Hotto 88'

Amadou Gon Coulibaly Stadium, Korhogo
Attendance: 13,991
Referee: Omar Artan (Somalia)

Tunisia	Namibia

GK	22	Bechir Ben Saïd
RB	21	Wajdi Kechrida
CB	3	Montassar Talbi
CB	4	Yassine Meriah
LB	12	Ali Maâloul
DM	17	Ellyes Skhiri
CM	5	Ali Ben Romdhane	(substituted off) 46'
CM	10	Anis Ben Slimane	(substituted off) 83'
RW	7	Youssef Msakni (c)
LW	27	Elias Achouri	(substituted off) 90+2'
CF	11	Taha Yassine Khenissi	(substituted off) 15'
Substitutions:
FW	9	Haythem Jouini	(substituted on) 15'
MF	14	Aïssa Laïdouni	(substituted on) 46'
FW	18	Sayfallah Ltaief	(substituted on) 83'
FW	19	Bassem Srarfi	(substituted on) 90+2'
Manager:
Jalel Kadri

GK	1	Lloyd Kazapua
RB	22	Ryan Nyambe
CB	21	Lubeni Haukongo
CB	12	Kennedy Amutenya
LB	4	Riaan Hanamub
DM	18	Aprocius Petrus
RM	11	Absalom Iimbondi
CM	19	Petrus Shitembi	(substituted off) 62'
CM	10	Prins Tjiueza	(substituted off) 73'
LM	7	Deon Hotto
CF	13	Peter Shalulile (c)
Substitutions:
MF	6	Ngero Katua	(substituted on) 62'
FW	9	Bethuel Muzeu	(substituted on) 73'
Manager:
Collin Benjamin

Man of the Match:
Deon Hotto (Namibia)

Assistant referees:
Gilbert Cheruiyot (Kenya)
Stephen Eleazar (Kenya)
Fourth official:
Tanguy Mebiame (Gabon)
Video assistant referee:
Daniel Nii Laryea (Ghana)
Assistant video assistant referee:
Ahmed Heerallal (Mauritius)

=== Mali vs South Africa ===
Mali and South Africa met for the fourth time, and this was their third meeting ever in the Africa Cup of Nations. The first came in the 2002 African Cup of Nations, when Mali, the tournament hosts, defeated South Africa 2–0 in a quarter-final. The nations also met in the quarter-finals of the 2013 Africa Cup of Nations, in which Mali advanced to the semi-finals via penalty kicks after a 1–1 draw in Durban, South Africa. South Africa missed three of four attempts during that penalty shoot-out, out victorious on penalties.

South Africa got a golden opportunity in the 16th minute when a foul by Sikou Niakaté on Evidence Makgopa gave South Africa a penalty, but Percy Tau missed. This proved to be costly for the South Africans, as Hamari Traoré scored a free kick in the 60th minute to give the West Africans the lead, before Lassine Sinayoko outmuscled Siyanda Xulu and struck home to secure Mali the win.

16 January 2024
20:00

Mali	2–0	South Africa
H. Traoré 60'; Sinayoko 66'	Report

Amadou Gon Coulibaly Stadium, Korhogo
Attendance: 16,894
Referee: Mohamed Adel (Egypt)

Mali	South Africa

GK	16	Djigui Diarra
RB	2	Hamari Traoré (c)
CB	5	Boubakar Kouyaté	(yellow card) 43'
CB	6	Sikou Niakaté	(yellow card) 18'
LB	17	Falaye Sacko
DM	23	Aliou Dieng		(substituted off) 78'
CM	10	Yves Bissouma		(substituted off) 58'
CM	4	Amadou Haidara		(substituted off) 87'
RW	25	Lassine Sinayoko		(substituted off) 86'
LW	26	Kamory Doumbia
CF	20	Sékou Koïta		(substituted off) 87'
Substitutions:
MF	11	Lassana Coulibaly	(yellow card) 90+4'	(substituted on) 58'
FW	19	Fousseni Diabaté		(substituted on) 78'
FW	9	Ibrahim Sissoko		(substituted on) 86'
FW	27	Dorgeles Nene		(substituted on) 87'
MF	24	Boubacar Traoré		(substituted on) 87'
Manager:
Éric Chelle

GK	1	Ronwen Williams (c)
RB	20	Khuliso Mudau
CB	5	Siyanda Xulu	(yellow card) 77'
CB	14	Mothobi Mvala	(yellow card) 58'
LB	6	Aubrey Modiba
RM	10	Percy Tau
CM	4	Teboho Mokoena
CM	13	Sphephelo Sithole
LM	12	Thapelo Maseko		(substituted off) 87'
CF	11	Themba Zwane		(substituted off) 74'
CF	9	Evidence Makgopa		(substituted off) 73'
Substitutions:
FW	17	Zakhele Lepasa		(substituted on) 73'
FW	21	Mihlali Mayambela		(substituted on) 74'
MF	23	Thapelo Morena		(substituted on) 87'
Manager:
(Belgium) Hugo Broos

Man of the Match:
Amadou Haidara (Mali)

Assistant referees:
Mahmoud Abo El Regal (Egypt)
Ahmed Hossam (Egypt)
Fourth official:
Amin Omar (Egypt)
Video assistant referee:
Lahlou Benbraham (Algeria)
Assistant video assistant referee:
Salima Mukansanga (Rwanda)

=== Tunisia vs Mali ===
Tunisia and Mali met for the 15th time, and the fourth time at an Africa Cup of Nations. In 2022, the nations met three times in three months. On 12 January 2022, the nations met at the 2021 Africa Cup of Nations to open Group F, and Ibrahima Kone's penalty kick in the 48th minute was the only goal of the match to give Mali the 1–0 victory. In March 2022, a spot at the 2022 FIFA World Cup was at stake when Tunisia and Mali met; the difference was an own goal from Mali's Moussa Sissako in the first leg in Bamako, as Tunisia advanced to its sixth FIFA World Cup.

In addition, Tunisia, the hosts of the 1994 African Cup of Nations, kicked off the tournament with a 2–0 defeat to Mali in Tunis. The nations also met in the 2019 Africa Cup of Nations, with the teams playing to a 1–1 draw in Suez, Egypt, on 25 June 2019. Finally, the nations also met in the quarter-finals of the 2016 African Nations Championship, with Mali winning 2–1 in Kigali, Rwanda.

The Tunisians fell behind from a clinical piece of play, as Kamory Doumbia delivered a brilliant pass before Lassine Sinayoko stroked into the far corner to give Mali the lead. Just ten minutes after Mali opened the scoring, Ali Abdi produced a run and a cut-back for Hamza Rafia to score the equalizer. However, this proved to be the final goal of the match.

20 January 2024
20:00

Tunisia	1–1	Mali
Rafia 20'	Report	Sinayoko 10'

Amadou Gon Coulibaly Stadium, Korhogo
Attendance: 18,130
Referee: Daniel Nii Laryea (Ghana)

Tunisia	Mali

GK	22	Bechir Ben Saïd
RB	21	Wajdi Kechrida
CB	3	Montassar Talbi
CB	4	Yassine Meriah
LB	2	Ali Abdi
RM	27	Elias Achouri		(substituted off) 70'
CM	17	Ellyes Skhiri
CM	14	Aïssa Laïdouni	(yellow card) 90+8'
LM	10	Anis Ben Slimane		(substituted off) 88'
CF	7	Youssef Msakni (c)		(substituted off) 88'
CF	8	Hamza Rafia		(substituted off) 78'
Substitutions:
FW	18	Sayfallah Ltaief		(substituted on) 70'
FW	19	Bassem Srarfi		(substituted on) 78'
MF	8	Mohamed Ali Ben Romdhane		(substituted on) 88'
FW	24	Seifeddine Jaziri	(yellow card) 90+4'	(substituted on) 88'
Manager:
Jalel Kadri

GK	16	Djigui Diarra
RB	2	Hamari Traoré (c)
CB	5	Boubakar Kouyaté
CB	6	Sikou Niakaté
LB	17	Falaye Sacko
DM	8	Diadie Samassékou	(substituted off) 83'
CM	11	Lassana Coulibaly
CM	4	Amadou Haidara	(substituted off) 69'
CF	25	Lassine Sinayoko	(substituted off) 83'
AM	26	Kamory Doumbia	(substituted off) 83'
CF	20	Sékou Koïta	(substituted off) 70'
Substitutions:
FW	27	Dorgeles Nene	(substituted on) 69'
FW	19	Fousseni Diabaté	(substituted on) 70'
FW	18	Youssoufou Niakaté	(substituted on) 83'
MF	10	Yves Bissouma	(substituted on) 83'
FW	9	Ibrahim Sissoko	(substituted on) 83'
Manager:
Éric Chelle

Man of the Match:
Kamory Doumbia (Mali)

Assistant referees:
Emiliano Dos Santos (Angola)
Oliveira Lopes (Angola)
Fourth official:
Pacifique Ndabihawenimana (Burundi)
Video assistant referee:
Salima Mukansanga (Rwanda)
Assistant video assistant referee:
Lahlou Benbraham (Algeria)

=== South Africa vs Namibia ===
South Africa and Namibia met for the 14th time, and this was their third meeting at the Africa Cup of Nations. The nations met in the group stage finale of the 1998 African Cup of Nations, with Benny McCarthy scoring four goals in 13 minutes in a 4–1 victory in Bobo-Dioulasso, Burkina Faso. The nations also met at the 2019 Africa Cup of Nations, in which Bongani Zungu scored the only goal of the match; a 1–0 victory would prove vital as South Africa was the fourth-best third-place team in the tournament. Namibia and South Africa have played seven times in the COSAFA Cup, and Namibia had last defeated South Africa in 1999, which came during this competition.

Namibia was the first to make opportunities, but following a handball by Deon Hotto in an attempt to block Thapelo Morena, a penalty was given, and Percy Tau scored. The situation became increasingly more favorable for the South Africans when Themba Zwane clinically finished from a pass from Morena in the 25th minute. Zwane scored a solo goal after a run down Namibia's right flank in the 40th minute. South Africa sealed their win in the 75th minute, when Teboho Mokoena gave a perfect long ball to Thapelo Maseko before Maseko finished over the hapless Lloyd Kazapua to make it four.

21 January 2024
20:00

South Africa	4–0	Namibia
Tau 14' (pen.); Zwane 25', 40'; Maseko 75'	Report

Amadou Gon Coulibaly Stadium, Korhogo
Attendance: 9,304
Referee: Youcef Gamouh (Algeria)

South Africa	Namibia

GK	1	Ronwen Williams (c)
RB	20	Khuliso Mudau
CB	18	Grant Kekana
CB	14	Mothobi Mvala
LB	6	Aubrey Modiba
CM	4	Teboho Mokoena		(substituted off) 90+3'
CM	13	Sphephelo Sithole	(yellow card) 55'	(substituted off) 70'
RW	23	Thapelo Morena		(substituted off) 80'
LW	10	Percy Tau
CF	11	Themba Zwane		(substituted off) 70'
CF	9	Evidence Makgopa		(substituted off) 80'
Substitutions:
MF	15	Thabang Monare		(substituted on) 70'
MF	12	Thapelo Maseko		(substituted on) 70'
FW	21	Mihlali Mayambela		(substituted on) 80'
FW	17	Zakhele Lepasa		(substituted on) 80'
MF	8	Jayden Adams		(substituted on) 90+3'
Manager:
(Belgium) Hugo Broos

GK	1	Lloyd Kazapua
RB	22	Ryan Nyambe	(substituted off) 73'
CB	12	Kennedy Amutenya
CB	21	Lubeni Haukongo
LB	4	Riaan Hanamub
DM	18	Aprocius Petrus
RM	11	Absalom Iimbondi	(substituted off) 45'
CM	19	Petrus Shitembi	(substituted off) 45'
CM	10	Prins Tjiueza	(substituted off) 73'
LM	7	Deon Hotto
CF	13	Peter Shalulile (c)
Substitutions:
MF	6	Ngero Katua	(substituted on) 45'
FW	9	Bethuel Muzeu	(substituted on) 45'
MF	17	Wendell Rudath	(substituted on) 73'
MF	14	Joslin Kamatuka	(substituted on) 73'
Manager:
Collin Benjamin

Man of the Match:
Themba Zwane (South Africa)

Assistant referees:
Mokrane Gourari (Algeria)
Nouho Ouattara (Ivory Coast)
Fourth official:
Samuel Uwikunda (Rwanda)
Video assistant referee:
Mustapha Ghorbal (Algeria)
Assistant video assistant referee:
Cumar Cartan (Somalia)

=== South Africa vs Tunisia ===
Tunisia and South Africa met for the seventh time, and the fifth at the Africa Cup of Nations. The first meeting came on 3 February 1996, in the 1996 African Cup of Nations final, in which two goals from Mark Williams won South Africa, the tournament hosts, its first-ever continental title in front of 80,000 fans in Johannesburg. met each other for the first time since 2008, where Tunisia claimed the win. The nations also met three other times: 2000 in Accra, Ghana, when South Africa defeated Tunisia 4–3 in a penalty shoot-out to finish third in the tournament. Tunisia's Ali Zitouni scored twice, including an 89th-minute goal to force extra time, but missed the final penalty kick in the shootout; 2006 in Alexandria, Egypt, with Tunisia winning 2–0 in the teams' second match in the group stage, a result that confirmed South Africa's elimination from the 2006 Africa Cup of Nations with a match to spare; and 2008 in Tamale, Ghana, with Tunisia winning 3–1 in the teams' second match in the group stage.

The match was a largely dull affair as Tunisia proved too timid while South Africa was too reluctant to make convincing efforts as South Africa held the advantages at hand. However, with the match becoming increasingly dire for Tunisia, the Tunisians were forced to pour everything forward and, as a result, they almost fell to counterattack traps by South Africa, notably a failed effort by Sphephelo Sithole. Haythem Jouini had a chance but his nodd over from a glorious position went wide, as the result ended goalless, enough for South Africa but too late for Tunisia.

This was the first time since 2013 (ironically hosted by South Africa) that Tunisia were eliminated in the group stage.

24 January 2024
17:00

South Africa	0–0	Tunisia
	Report

Amadou Gon Coulibaly Stadium, Korhogo
Attendance: 12,847
Referee: Issa Sy (Senegal)

South Africa	Tunisia

GK	1	Ronwen Williams (c)
RB	20	Khuliso Mudau	(substituted off) 45'
CB	18	Grant Kekana
CB	14	Mothobi Mvala
LB	6	Aubrey Modiba
CM	4	Teboho Mokoena
CM	13	Sphephelo Sithole
RW	23	Thapelo Morena	(substituted off) 67'
LW	10	Percy Tau
CF	11	Themba Zwane	(substituted off) 80'
CF	9	Evidence Makgopa	(substituted off) 84'
Substitutions:
DF	2	Nyiko Mobbie	(substituted on) 45'
FW	12	Thapelo Maseko	(substituted on) 67'
MF	15	Thabang Monare	(substituted on) 80'
FW	17	Zakhele Lepasa	(substituted on) 84'
Manager:
(Belgium) Hugo Broos

GK	22	Bechir Ben Saïd
RB	21	Wajdi Kechrida
CB	3	Montassar Talbi
CB	4	Yassine Meriah (c)
LB	2	Ali Abdi
RM	8	Hamza Rafia	(substituted off) 70'
CM	17	Ellyes Skhiri	(substituted off) 84'
CM	14	Aïssa Laïdouni
LM	10	Anis Ben Slimane	(substituted off) 59'
CF	27	Elias Achouri	(substituted off) 70'
CF	24	Seifeddine Jaziri	(substituted off) 70'
Substitutions:
FW	7	Youssef Msakni	(substituted on) 59'
FW	18	Sayfallah Ltaief	(substituted on) 70'
FW	23	Naïm Sliti	(substituted on) 70'
FW	9	Haythem Jouini	(substituted on) 70'
MF	5	Ali Ben Romdhane	(substituted on) 84'
Manager:
Jalel Kadri

Man of the Match:
Themba Zwane (South Africa)

Assistant referees:
Nouha Bangoura (Senegal)
Éric Ayimavo (Benin)
Fourth official:
Louis Houngnandande (Benin)
Video assistant referee:
Dahane Beida (Mauritania)
Assistant video assistant referee:
Diana Chicotesha (Zambia)

=== Namibia vs Mali ===
Mali and Namibia met for the seventh time, and the first at a group stage of the Africa Cup of Nations. The previous six meetings came in qualification matches for three separate editions of the Africa Cup of Nations. The most recent involved two matches in November 2020, with Mali winning both matches; the second match, a 2–1 victory in Windhoek, Namibia, secured Mali's qualification for the 2021 Africa Cup of Nations. was the first time the two teams met in AFCON. Mali and Namibia also met while qualifying for the 1996 and 2000 Africa Cup of Nations, although both nations failed to qualify for those respective tournaments.

Prins Tjiueza was played through on goal before trying to place a shot in the far-bottom corner but it was denied by Djigui Diarra as Mali slowly regained control of the match and produced numerous attempts, but none could convert into goals. With increasing pressure, Mali became increasingly desperate for the win. However, as the match went to final minutes, Namibia dug deep to prevent any further Malian attempts as both teams were satisfied with a goalless draw.

This result was historic for Namibia, as they advanced past the group stage for the first time.

24 January 2024
17:00

Namibia	0–0	Mali
	Report

Laurent Pokou Stadium, San-Pédro
Attendance: 15,231
Referee: Samuel Uwikunda (Rwanda)

Namibia	Mali

GK	1	Lloyd Kazapua
RB	20	Ivan Kamberipa
CB	12	Kennedy Amutenya
CB	21	Lubeni Haukongo
LB	4	Riaan Hanamub
CM	10	Prins Tjiueza		(substituted off) 79'
CM	18	Aprocius Petrus
CM	6	Ngero Katua		(substituted off) 89'
RF	9	Bethuel Muzeu		(substituted off) 74'
CF	13	Peter Shalulile (c)		(substituted off) 90'
LF	7	Deon Hotto	(yellow card) 45+5'
Substitutions:
MF	11	Absalom Iimbondi		(substituted on) 74'
MF	15	Marcel Papama		(substituted on) 79'
DF	5	Charles Hambira		(substituted on) 89'
DF	2	Denzil Haoseb		(substituted on) 90'
Manager:
Collin Benjamin

GK	16	Djigui Diarra
RB	2	Hamari Traoré (c)
CB	5	Boubakar Kouyaté
CB	6	Sikou Niakaté
LB	13	Moussa Diarra	(substituted off) 68'
RM	19	Fousseni Diabaté	(substituted off) 81'
CM	23	Aliou Dieng	(substituted off) 68'
CM	10	Yves Bissouma
LM	27	Dorgeles Nene
CF	18	Youssoufou Niakaté	(substituted off) 53'
CF	25	Lassine Sinayoko	(substituted off) 52'
Substitutions:
FW	9	Ibrahim Sissoko	(substituted on) 52'
MF	26	Kamory Doumbia	(substituted on) 53'
DF	3	Amadou Dante	(substituted on) 68'
MF	12	Mohamed Camara	(substituted on) 68'
MF	21	Adama Traoré	(substituted on) 81'
Manager:
Éric Chelle

Man of the Match:
Deon Hotto (Namibia)

Assistant referees:
Adou Ngoh (Ivory Coast)
Nouho Ouattara (Ivory Coast)
Fourth official:
Ibrahim Traoré (Ivory Coast)
Video assistant referee:
Lahlou Benbraham (Algeria)
Assistant video assistant referee:
Salima Mukansanga (Rwanda)

== Discipline ==
Fair play points would have been used as tiebreakers if the overall and head-to-head records of teams were tied. These were calculated based on yellow and red cards received in all group matches as follows:

Only one of the above deductions was applied to a player in a single match.

Team	Match 1				Match 2				Match 3				Points
Team	Booked	(yellow card) (yellow-red card)	Sent off (straight red)	(yellow card) (red card)	Booked	(yellow card) (yellow-red card)	Sent off (straight red)	(yellow card) (red card)	Booked	(yellow card) (yellow-red card)	Sent off (straight red)	(yellow card) (red card)	Points
Tunisia					2								–2
Mali	3												–3
South Africa	2				1								–3
Namibia									1				–1
