= 2023 Africa Cup of Nations =

International football competition

Coupe d'Afrique des Nations 2023
- Official logo

Tournament details
- Host country: Ivory Coast
- Dates: 13 January – 11 February 2024
- Teams: 24
- Venues: 6 (in 5 host cities)

Final positions
- Champions: Ivory Coast (3rd title)
- Runners-up: Nigeria
- Third place: South Africa
- Fourth place: DR Congo

Tournament statistics
- Matches played: 52
- Goals scored: 119 (2.29 per match)
- Attendance: 1,109,593 (21,338 per match)
- Top scorer(s): (Equatorial Guinea) Emilio Nsue (5 goals)
- Best player: (Nigeria) William Troost-Ekong
- Best young player: (Ivory Coast) Simon Adingra
- Best goalkeeper: (South Africa) Ronwen Williams
- Fair play award: South Africa

The 2023 Africa Cup of Nations, also referred to as AFCON 2023 or CAN 2023, and for sponsorship purposes as the TotalEnergies 2023 Africa Cup of Nations, was the 34th edition of the biennial Africa Cup of Nations tournament organised by the Confederation of African Football (CAF). It was hosted by the Ivory Coast, taking place in the country for the second time following the 1984 edition.

This edition of the tournament was initially planned to take place during the Northern Hemisphere's summer like the 2019 edition, in order to reduce scheduling conflicts with European club teams and competitions. However, it was postponed by CAF to 13 January – 11 February 2024 on 3 July 2022 due to the summer weather concerns in Ivory Coast, although the competition retained the original name for sponsorship purposes. This followed the previous edition in 2021 in Cameroon also being moved to the Northern Hemisphere's winter season for similar reasons, albeit coupled with postponement due to the impact of the COVID-19 pandemic on the CAF calendar.

Host nation Ivory Coast won the tournament for their third title, despite barely advancing to the knockout stages and replacing their head coach mid-tournament. They beat Nigeria 2–1 in the final, having also beaten defending champions Senegal in the round of 16 on penalties.

== Host selection ==
The hosting rights for this edition of the tournament were initially awarded to Guinea during a meeting of the CAF executive committee on 20 September 2014, which also awarded the 2019 edition to Cameroon and the 2021 edition to Ivory Coast. At the time, the announcement of the 2023 host was unscheduled; Guinea was one of the bidders for the 2019 and 2021 editions, and per CAF's assertions, on the basis of the country's presentation "and commitment", the committee "decided to exercise its power to make an immediate decision".

A CAF executive committee meeting on 20 July 2017 brought about changes for the tournament moving forward, including an increase in group stage participation teams from 16 to 24 from the 2019 edition. With the new specifications, Cameroon could not reach the preparation deadlines for the-then following 2019 edition and got stripped of the hosting rights on 30 November 2018, with the hosting rights handed over to Egypt on 8 January 2019. Cameroon opted for and hosted the 2021 edition instead, which led to original 2021 hosts Ivory Coast organising the 2023 edition. Guinea's hosting duties were pushed back to 2025, which until then had unscheduled hosts, though it could not get ready on time either and was eventually stripped from hosting.

Although the tournament retained its original 2023 branding, it was moved to January–February 2024 upon Ivory Coast's request, in order to avoid the West and Central African tropical rain season, which typically reaches its peak around June–July.

== Marketing ==
=== Sponsorship ===
Title sponsor	Official sponsors	National sponsors
TotalEnergies; 1XBET; Rexona; Visa; Puma; Orange	Air Côte d'Ivoire; Apsonic; Ecobank; Razzl; Tecno	Celeste; Porteo; LONACI; Smart Technologies

=== Mascot ===
Akwaba, the official mascot of the 2023 Africa Cup of Nations

The organising board of the 2023 African Cup of Nations unveiled the competition's mascot "Akwaba", which means "Welcome" in the Baoulé language. It is an elephant whose kit bears resemblance to the host nation Ivory Coast's home colours.

=== Match ball ===
On 12 October 2023, CAF and Puma unveiled the "Pokou" as the official tournament match ball ahead of the final tournament draw. The name was chosen to honourthe late legendary Ivorian forward Laurent Pokou, locally known for scoring five goals in the 6–1 victory over Ethiopia at the 1970 edition of the tournament, which stands as a record to date.

=== Official song ===
On 12 October 2023, CAF announced "Akwaba", as the official anthem for the competition during the official draw. The song features Nigerian artist Yemi Alade, Egyptian rapper Mohamed Ramadan, and Ivorian music band Magic System. The anthem, whose title it shares with the tournament's mascot, is a fusion of Afrobeats, rap and zouglou considered stylistically similar to the competition's previous anthems.

== Teams ==
Qualified Failed to qualify Withdrew or did not enter Suspended Not a member of the CAF

All 54 teams originally registered for qualification was held in two rounds like in the previous editions in 2019 and 2021. Réunion and Zanzibar were not full members of the CAF and were therefore excluded from participation. Eritrea withdrew after the first round draw. Kenya and Zimbabwe were suspended by FIFA at the time of the second round draw and were excluded from the competition after their suspensions were not lifted in time.

In the preliminary round, the twelve lowest-ranked teams in the FIFA world rankings of December 2021 competed against each other in a knockout system with two legs. The six winners of the preliminary round and the remaining 42 higher-placed teams were drawn into twelve groups of four in April 2022. The second round was played from June 2022 to September 2023 in a double round format. The group winners and runners-up from all twelve groups, with the exception of Group H, qualified for the final round. Apart from the hosts from Ivory Coast, only one other team qualified from Group H.

=== Qualified teams ===
The following teams qualified for this edition of the tournament with no debutant nation for the first time since the 2015 edition. Seventeen teams that participated in the most recent edition in 2021 returned for the event.

DR Congo, South Africa, Angola, Namibia, and Tanzania made their return to the Africa Cup of Nations after missing out on the 2021 edition. Zambia made its return after an almost nine-year absence from the event. Mozambique made its fifth appearance after a fourteen-year absence.

The Comoros failed to qualify after making their debut in 2021, whereas Kenya and Zimbabwe were disqualified due to their suspension from FIFA. Sudan, Malawi, Gabon, Sierra Leone, and Ethiopia also failed to qualify after appearing in the 2021 tournament.

Team	Method of qualification	Date of qualification	Finals appearance	Last appearance	Previous best performance
Ivory Coast	Hosts / Group H runners-up	30 January 2019	25th	2021	Champions (1992, 2015)
Morocco	Group K winners	24 March 2023	19th	2021	Champions (1976)
Algeria	Group F winners	27 March 2023	20th	2021	Champions (1990, 2019)
South Africa	Group K runners-up	28 March 2023	11th	2019	Champions (1996)
Senegal	Group L winners	28 March 2023	17th	2021	Champions (2021)
Burkina Faso	Group B winners	28 March 2023	13th	2021	Runners-up (2013)
Tunisia	Group J winners	28 March 2023	21st	2021	Champions (2004)
Egypt	Group D winners	14 June 2023	26th	2021	Champions (1957, 1959, 1986, 1998, 2006, 2008, 2010)
Zambia	Group H winners	17 June 2023	18th	2015	Champions (2012)
Equatorial Guinea	Group J runners-up	17 June 2023	4th	2021	Fourth place (2015)
Nigeria	Group A winners	18 June 2023	20th	2021	Champions (1980, 1994, 2013)
Guinea-Bissau	Group A runners-up	18 June 2023	4th	2021	Group stage (2017, 2019, 2021)
Cape Verde	Group B runners-up	18 June 2023	4th	2021	Quarter-finalists (2013)
Mali	Group G winners	18 June 2023	13th	2021	Runners-up (1972)
Guinea	Group D runners-up	20 June 2023	14th	2021	Runners-up (1976)
Ghana	Group E winners	7 September 2023	24th	2021	Champions (1963, 1965, 1978, 1982)
Angola	Group E runners-up	7 September 2023	9th	2019	Quarter-finalists (2008, 2010)
Tanzania	Group F runners-up	7 September 2023	3rd	2019	Group stage (1980, 2019)
Mozambique	Group L runners-up	9 September 2023	5th	2010	Group stage (1986, 1996, 1998, 2010)
DR Congo	Group I winners	9 September 2023	20th	2019	Champions (1968, 1974)
Mauritania	Group I runners-up	9 September 2023	3rd	2021	Group stage (2019, 2021)
Gambia	Group G runners-up	10 September 2023	2nd	2021	Quarter-finalists (2021)
Cameroon	Group C winners	12 September 2023	21st	2021	Champions (1984, 1988, 2000, 2002, 2017)
Namibia	Group C runners-up	12 September 2023	4th	2019	Group stage (1998, 2008, 2019)

== Venues ==
Location of the host cities of the 2023 Africa Cup of Nations
1 Abidjan
2 Bouaké
3 Korhogo
4 San-Pédro
5 Yamoussoukro

In September 2017, the government of Ivory Coast launched a public tender for the venues of the competition. This included public tender requested bids for renovating and expanding the existing Felix Houphouët Boigny Stadium in Abidjan and the Stade de la Paix (Peace Stadium) of Bouaké, and building new stadiums in Yamoussoukro as well as the cities of Korhogo and San-Pédro. The three new stadiums were to have a capacity of 20,000 each.

In addition to the renovation or construction of stadiums, the tender included the renovation or construction of training facilities in the host cities: eight in Abidjan and four in Bouaké, Korhogo, Yamoussoukro and San-Pédro. It also included the construction of 96 villas (five rooms per villa) in those cities. In addition, the bidding nations were to be submitted to build a three-star hotel of fifty rooms in Korhogo.

City	Stadium	Capacity
Abidjan	Alassane Ouattara Stadium	60,000
Abidjan	Felix Houphouet Boigny Stadium	33,000
Bouaké	Stade de la Paix	40,000
Korhogo	Amadou Gon Coulibaly Stadium	20,000
San-Pédro	Laurent Pokou Stadium	20,000
Yamoussoukro	Charles Konan Banny Stadium	20,000

== Opening ceremony ==
The opening ceremony of the stadium began at 17:25 with the setting up of the animation groups and the cultural activities which lasted until 20:00. Guests and officials were set up until the start of the opening match at 20:00. Among the guests were members of the Confederation of African Football (CAF), members of the diplomatic corps, presidents of legislative and judicial institutions, members of government including the president of COCAN 2023 and the presidents of CAF and FIFA.

== Match officials ==
On 12 September 2023, a total of 26 referees, 30 assistants and 12 video assistant referees (VAR) were named for the tournament. In January 2024, Bouchra Karboubi became the first woman from North Africa and the Arab world to officiate a men's AFCON match by refereeing the match between Guinea-Bissau and Nigeria in the third day of the group stage.

=== Referees ===
- (Algeria) Youcef Gamouh
- (Algeria) Mustapha Ghorbal
- (Benin) Louis Houngnandande
- (Burundi) Pacifique Ndabihawenimana
- (Chad) Alhadi Allaou Mahamat
- (Democratic Republic of the Congo) Jean-Jacques Ndala
- (Egypt) Mohamed Adel
- (Egypt) Mohamed Maarouf
- (Egypt) Amin Omar
- (Ethiopia) Bamlak Tessema Weyesa
- (Gabon) Pierre Atcho
- (Gabon) Tanguy Mebiame
- (Ivory Coast) Ibrahim Kalilou Traoré
- (Kenya) Peter Waweru
- (Libya) Mutaz Ibrahim
- (Mali) Boubou Traoré
- (Mauritania) Dahane Beida
- (Mauritania) Abdel Aziz Bouh
- (Morocco) Samir Guezzaz
- (Morocco) Jalal Jayed
- (Morocco) Bouchra Karboubi
- (Rwanda) Samuel Uwikunda
- (Senegal) Issa Sy
- (Somalia) Omar Artan
- (South Africa) Abongile Tom
- (Sudan) Mahmood Ismail

=== Assistant referees ===
- (Algeria) Mokrane Gourari
- (Algeria) Abbes Zerhouni
- (Angola) Emiliano Dos Santos
- (Angola) Oliveira Lopes
- (Benin) Eric Ayimavo
- (Burkina Faso) Tiama Seydou
- (Cameroon) Carine Fomo
- (Cameroon) Elvis Noupue
- (Republic of the Congo) Steven Moutsassi
- (Djibouti) Liban Abdoulrazack
- (Egypt) Mahmoud Abouregal
- (Egypt) Ahmed Ibrahim
- (Gabon) Ditsoga Marlene
- (Ivory Coast) Ngoh Hermann
- (Ivory Coast) Nouho Ouattara
- (Kenya) Gilbert Cheruiyot
- (Kenya) Stephen Yiembe
- (Lesotho) Sourou Phatsoane
- (Libya) Amsaed Essa
- (Madagascar) Dimbiniaina Andriatianarivelo
- (Mali) Modibo Samake
- (Morocco) Mostafa Akarkad
- (Morocco) Azgaou Lahsen
- (Mozambique) Arsenio Maringule
- (São Tomé and Príncipe) Dos Abdelmiro
- (Senegal) Nouha Bangoura
- (Senegal) Djibril Camara
- (Sudan) Ibrahim Mohamed
- (Togo) Ahonto Koffi
- (Tunisia) Hassani Khalil
- (Zambia) Diana Chikotesha

=== Video assistant referees ===
- (Algeria) Lahlou Benbraham
- (Egypt) Mohamed Ashour
- (Egypt) Mahmoud El Banna
- (Ghana) Daniel Nii Laryea
- (Mauritius) Ahmed Heerallal
- (Mauritius) Maria Rivet
- (Morocco) Zakaria Brinsi
- (Morocco) Redouane Jiyed
- (Rwanda) Salima Mukansanga
- (South Africa) Akhona Makalima
- (Sudan) Mohamed Ibrahim
- (Tunisia) Haythem Guirat

== Draw ==
The final draw was held at the Parc des Expositions d'Abidjan in Abidjan on 12 October 2023. The event was hosted by Senegalese-American musician Akon, whilst the draw was conducted by former African footballers Didier Drogba and Mikel John Obi, alongside current internationals Sadio Mané and Achraf Hakimi. The 24 teams were divided into six groups of four each, with the four initial pots determined based on the September 2023 FIFA World Rankings (shown in parentheses), listed below. Ivory Coast were automatically given the top seed and assigned to position A1 in the draw as hosts.

Pot 1	Pot 2	Pot 3	Pot 4
Ivory Coast (50) (hosts); Morocco (13); Senegal (20) (title holders); Tunisia (29); Algeria (34); Egypt (35)	Nigeria (40); Cameroon (41); Mali (49); Burkina Faso (58); Ghana (60); DR Congo (64)	South Africa (65); Cape Verde (71); Guinea (81); Zambia (82); Equatorial Guinea (92); Mauritania (99)	Guinea-Bissau (102); Mozambique (108); Namibia (114); Angola (117); Gambia (118); Tanzania (122)

== Group stage ==
The fixture schedule for this edition of the tournament was released on 20 October 2023, following the group stage draw.

=== Tiebreakers ===
Teams were ranked according to points (3 points for a win, 1 point for a draw, 0 points for a loss).

If two teams were tied on points, the following tiebreaking criteria were applied, in the order given, to determine the rankings (Regulations Article 74):

1. Points in head-to-head matches match between the two tied teams;
2. Goal difference in all group matches;
3. Goals scored in all group matches;
4. Drawing of lots.

If more than two teams were tied, the following criteria were applied instead:

1. Points in matches between the tied teams;
2. Goal difference in matches between the tied teams;
3. Goals scored in matches between the tied teams;
4. If after applying all criteria above, two teams were still tied, the above criteria were again applied to matches played between the two teams in question. If this did not resolve the tie, the next three criteria were applied;
5. Goal difference in all group matches;
6. Goals scored in all group matches;
7. Drawing of lots.

=== Group A ===
Pos	Team	Pld	W	D	L	GF	GA	GD	Pts	Qualification
1	Equatorial Guinea	3	2	1	0	9	3	+6	7 (Note: Tied on head-to-head points. Overall goal difference: Equatorial Guinea +6, Nigeria +2.)	Advance to knockout stage
2	Nigeria	3	2	1	0	3	1	+2	7	Advance to knockout stage
3	Ivory Coast (H)	3	1	0	2	2	5	−3	3	Advance to knockout stage
4	Guinea-Bissau	3	0	0	3	2	7	−5	0	

Source: CAF
(H) Hosts
Notes:
13 January 2024
20:00

Ivory Coast	2–0	Guinea-Bissau
S. Fofana 4'; Krasso 58'	Report

Alassane Ouattara Stadium, Abidjan
Attendance: 36,858
Referee: Amin Omar (Egypt)
14 January 2024
14:00

Nigeria	1–1	Equatorial Guinea
Osimhen 38'	Report	Salvador 36'

Alassane Ouattara Stadium, Abidjan
Attendance: 8,500
Referee: Abongile Tom (South Africa)

18 January 2024
14:00

Equatorial Guinea	4–2	Guinea-Bissau
Nsue 21', 51', 61'; Miranda 46'	Report	Esteban 37' (o.g.); Zé Turbo 90+3'

Alassane Ouattara Stadium, Abidjan
Attendance: 13,888
Referee: Samuel Uwikunda (Rwanda)
18 January 2024
17:00

Ivory Coast	0–1	Nigeria
	Report	Troost-Ekong 55' (pen.)

Alassane Ouattara Stadium, Abidjan
Attendance: 49,517
Referee: Mustapha Ghorbal (Algeria)

22 January 2024
17:00

Equatorial Guinea	4–0	Ivory Coast
Nsue 42', 75'; Ganet 73'; Buyla 88'	Report

Alassane Ouattara Stadium, Abidjan
Attendance: 42,550
Referee: Mahmood Ismail (Sudan)
22 January 2024
17:00

Guinea-Bissau	0–1	Nigeria
	Report	Sanganté 36' (o.g.)

Felix Houphouet Boigny Stadium, Abidjan
Attendance: 15,650
Referee: Bouchra Karboubi (Morocco)

=== Group B ===
Pos	Team	Pld	W	D	L	GF	GA	GD	Pts	Qualification
1	Cape Verde	3	2	1	0	7	3	+4	7	Advance to knockout stage
2	Egypt	3	0	3	0	6	6	0	3	Advance to knockout stage
3	Ghana	3	0	2	1	5	6	−1	2 (Note: Tied on head-to-head points. Overall goal difference: Ghana −1, Mozambique −3.)	
4	Mozambique	3	0	2	1	4	7	−3	2	

Source: CAF
Notes:
14 January 2024
17:00

Egypt	2–2	Mozambique
Mohamed 2'; Salah 90+7' (pen.)	Report	Witi 55'; Clésio 58'

Felix Houphouet Boigny Stadium, Abidjan
Attendance: 11,933
Referee: Dahane Beida (Mauritania)
14 January 2024
20:00

Ghana	1–2	Cape Verde
Djiku 56'	Report	Monteiro 17'; Rodrigues 90+2'

Felix Houphouet Boigny Stadium, Abidjan
Attendance: 11,943
Referee: Jean-Jacques Ndala (DR Congo)

18 January 2024
20:00

Egypt	2–2	Ghana
Marmoush 69'; Mohamed 74'	Report	Kudus 45+3', 71'

Felix Houphouet Boigny Stadium, Abidjan
Attendance: 20,808
Referee: Pierre Atcho (Gabon)
19 January 2024
14:00

Cape Verde	3–0	Mozambique
Bebé 32'; Mendes 51'; Pina 69'	Report

Felix Houphouet Boigny Stadium, Abidjan
Attendance: 5,794
Referee: Samir Guezzaz (Morocco)

22 January 2024
20:00

Mozambique	2–2	Ghana
Geny 90+1' (pen.); Mandava 90+4'	Report	J. Ayew 15' (pen.), 70' (pen.)

Alassane Ouattara Stadium, Abidjan
Attendance: 6,000
Referee: Mutaz Ibrahim (Libya)
22 January 2024
20:00

Cape Verde	2–2	Egypt
G. Tavares 45+1'; Teixeira 90+9'	Report	Trézéguet 50'; Mohamed 90+3'

Felix Houphouet Boigny Stadium, Abidjan
Attendance: 15,650
Referee: Alhadi Allaou Mahamat (Chad)

=== Group C ===
Pos	Team	Pld	W	D	L	GF	GA	GD	Pts	Qualification
1	Senegal	3	3	0	0	8	1	+7	9	Advance to knockout stage
2	Cameroon	3	1	1	1	5	6	−1	4 (Note: Tied on head-to-head points and overall goal difference. Overall goals scored: Cameroon 5, Guinea 2.)	Advance to knockout stage
3	Guinea	3	1	1	1	2	3	−1	4	Advance to knockout stage
4	Gambia	3	0	0	3	2	7	−5	0	

Source: CAF
Notes:
15 January 2024
14:00

Senegal	3–0	Gambia
P. Gueye 4'; Camara 52', 86'	Report

Charles Konan Banny Stadium, Yamoussoukro
Attendance: 7,896
Referee: Redouane Jiyed (Morocco)
15 January 2024
17:00

Cameroon	1–1	Guinea
Magri 51'	Report	Bayo 10'

Charles Konan Banny Stadium, Yamoussoukro
Attendance: 11,271
Referee: Mutaz Ibrahim (Libya)

19 January 2024
17:00

Senegal	3–1	Cameroon
I. Sarr 16'; H. Diallo 71'; Mané 90+5'	Report	Castelletto 83'

Charles Konan Banny Stadium, Yamoussoukro
Attendance: 19,176
Referee: Mahmood Ismail (Sudan)
19 January 2024
20:00

Guinea	1–0	Gambia
A. Camara 69'	Report

Charles Konan Banny Stadium, Yamoussoukro
Attendance: 19,822
Referee: Abdel Aziz Bouh (Mauritania)

23 January 2024
17:00

Guinea	0–2	Senegal
	Report	Seck 61'; I. Ndiaye 90'

Charles Konan Banny Stadium, Yamoussoukro
Attendance: 15,753
Referee: Pacifique Ndabihawenimana (Burundi)
23 January 2024
17:00

Gambia	2–3	Cameroon
Jallow 72'; E. Colley 85'	Report	Toko Ekambi 56'; Gomez 87' (o.g.); Wooh 90+1'

Stade de la Paix, Bouaké
Attendance: 24,172
Referee: Bamlak Tessema Weyesa (Ethiopia)

=== Group D ===
Pos	Team	Pld	W	D	L	GF	GA	GD	Pts	Qualification
1	Angola	3	2	1	0	6	3	+3	7	Advance to knockout stage
2	Burkina Faso	3	1	1	1	3	4	−1	4	Advance to knockout stage
3	Mauritania	3	1	0	2	3	4	−1	3	Advance to knockout stage
4	Algeria	3	0	2	1	3	4	−1	2	

Source: CAF
15 January 2024
20:00

Algeria	1–1	Angola
Bounedjah 18'	Report	Mabululu 68' (pen.)

Stade de la Paix, Bouaké
Attendance: 19,740
Referee: Issa Sy (Senegal)
16 January 2024
14:00

Burkina Faso	1–0	Mauritania
Traoré 90+6' (pen.)	Report

Stade de la Paix, Bouaké
Attendance: 27,898
Referee: Jalal Jiyed (Morocco)

20 January 2024
14:00

Algeria	2–2	Burkina Faso
Bounedjah 51', 90+5'	Report	M. Konaté 45+3'; Traoré 71' (pen.)

Stade de la Paix, Bouaké
Attendance: 33,501
Referee: Abongile Tom (South Africa)
20 January 2024
17:00

Mauritania	2–3	Angola
Amar 43'; Koita 58'	Report	Dala 30', 50'; Gilberto 53'

Stade de la Paix, Bouaké
Attendance: 36,318
Referee: Mohamed Maarouf (Egypt)

23 January 2024
20:00

Angola	2–0	Burkina Faso
Mabululu 36'; Zini 90+2'	Report

Charles Konan Banny Stadium, Yamoussoukro
Attendance: 15,753
Referee: Jean-Jacques Ndala (DR Congo)
23 January 2024
20:00

Mauritania	1–0	Algeria
Yali 37'	Report

Stade de la Paix, Bouaké
Attendance: 28,010
Referee: Omar Artan (Somalia)

=== Group E ===
Pos	Team	Pld	W	D	L	GF	GA	GD	Pts	Qualification
1	Mali	3	1	2	0	3	1	+2	5	Advance to knockout stage
2	South Africa	3	1	1	1	4	2	+2	4 (Note: Head-to-head points: South Africa 3, Namibia 0.)	Advance to knockout stage
3	Namibia	3	1	1	1	1	4	−3	4	Advance to knockout stage
4	Tunisia	3	0	2	1	1	2	−1	2	

Source: CAF
Notes:
16 January 2024
17:00

Tunisia	0–1	Namibia
	Report	Hotto 88'

Amadou Gon Coulibaly Stadium, Korhogo
Attendance: 13,991
Referee: Omar Artan (Somalia)
16 January 2024
20:00

Mali	2–0	South Africa
H. Traoré 60'; Sinayoko 66'	Report

Amadou Gon Coulibaly Stadium, Korhogo
Attendance: 16,894
Referee: Mohamed Adel (Egypt)

20 January 2024
20:00

Tunisia	1–1	Mali
Rafia 20'	Report	Sinayoko 10'

Amadou Gon Coulibaly Stadium, Korhogo
Attendance: 18,130
Referee: Daniel Nii Laryea (Ghana)
21 January 2024
20:00

South Africa	4–0	Namibia
Tau 14' (pen.); Zwane 25', 40'; Maseko 75'	Report

Amadou Gon Coulibaly Stadium, Korhogo
Attendance: 9,304
Referee: Youcef Gamouh (Algeria)

24 January 2024
17:00

South Africa	0–0	Tunisia
	Report

Amadou Gon Coulibaly Stadium, Korhogo
Attendance: 12,847
Referee: Issa Sy (Senegal)
24 January 2024
17:00

Namibia	0–0	Mali
	Report

Laurent Pokou Stadium, San-Pédro
Attendance: 15,231
Referee: Samuel Uwikunda (Rwanda)

=== Group F ===
Pos	Team	Pld	W	D	L	GF	GA	GD	Pts	Qualification
1	Morocco	3	2	1	0	5	1	+4	7	Advance to knockout stage
2	DR Congo	3	0	3	0	2	2	0	3	Advance to knockout stage
3	Zambia	3	0	2	1	2	3	−1	2 (Note: Tied on head-to-head points. Overall goal difference: Zambia −1, Tanzania −3.)	
4	Tanzania	3	0	2	1	1	4	−3	2	

Source: CAF
Notes:
17 January 2024
17:00

Morocco	3–0	Tanzania
Saïss 30'; Ounahi 77'; En-Nesyri 80'	Report

Laurent Pokou Stadium, San-Pédro
Attendance: 15,478
Referee: Alhadj Allaou Mahamat (Chad)
17 January 2024
20:00

DR Congo	1–1	Zambia
Wissa 27'	Report	Kangwa 23'

Laurent Pokou Stadium, San-Pédro
Attendance: 15,478
Referee: Bamlak Tessema Weyesa (Ethiopia)

21 January 2024
14:00

Morocco	1–1	DR Congo
Hakimi 6'	Report	Silas 76'

Laurent Pokou Stadium, San-Pédro
Attendance: 13,342
Referee: Peter Waweru (Kenya)
21 January 2024
17:00

Zambia	1–1	Tanzania
Daka 88'	Report	Msuva 11'

Laurent Pokou Stadium, San-Pédro
Attendance: 13,342
Referee: Djindo Louis Houngnandande (Benin)

24 January 2024
20:00

Tanzania	0–0	DR Congo
	Report

Amadou Gon Coulibaly Stadium, Korhogo
Attendance: 12,847
Referee: Amin Omar (Egypt)
24 January 2024
20:00

Zambia	0–1	Morocco
	Report	Ziyech 37'

Laurent Pokou Stadium, San-Pédro
Attendance: 15,231
Referee: Patrice Tanguy (Gabon)

=== Ranking of third-placed teams ===
Pos	Grp	Team	Pld	W	D	L	GF	GA	GD	Pts	Qualification
1	C	Guinea	3	1	1	1	2	3	−1	4	Advance to knockout stage
2	E	Namibia	3	1	1	1	1	4	−3	4	Advance to knockout stage
3	D	Mauritania	3	1	0	2	3	4	−1	3	Advance to knockout stage
4	A	Ivory Coast (H)	3	1	0	2	2	5	−3	3	Advance to knockout stage
5	B	Ghana	3	0	2	1	5	6	−1	2	
6	F	Zambia	3	0	2	1	2	3	−1	2	

Source: CAF
Rules for classification: 1) Points; 2) Goal difference; 3) Goals scored; 4) Disciplinary points; 5) Drawing of lots.
(H) Hosts

== Knockout stage ==
=== Bracket ===
Round of 16
27 January – Abidjan (H.B)
Nigeria	2
Cameroon	0
27 January – Bouaké
Angola	3
Namibia	0
29 January – Abidjan (H.B)
Cape Verde	1
Mauritania	0
30 January – San Pédro
Morocco	0
South Africa	2
30 January – Korhogo
Mali	2
Burkina Faso	1
29 January – Yamoussoukro
Senegal	1 (4)
Ivory Coast (p)	1 (5)
28 January – San Pédro
Egypt	1 (7)
DR Congo (p)	1 (8)
28 January – Abidjan (Ouattara)
Equatorial Guinea	0
Guinea	1

Quarter-finals
2 February – Abidjan (H.B)
Nigeria	1
Angola	0
3 February – Yamoussoukro
Cape Verde	0 (1)
South Africa (p)	0 (2)
3 February – Bouaké
Mali	1
Ivory Coast (a.e.t.)	2
2 February – Abidjan (Ouattara)
DR Congo	3
Guinea	1

Semi-finals
7 February – Bouaké
Nigeria (p)	1 (4)
South Africa	1 (2)
7 February – Abidjan (Ouattara)
Ivory Coast	1
DR Congo	0

Final
11 February – Abidjan (Ouattara)
Nigeria	1
Ivory Coast	2
Third place play-off
10 February – Abidjan (H.B)
South Africa (p)	0 (6)
DR Congo	0 (5)

=== Round of 16 ===
27 January 2024
17:00

Angola	3–0	Namibia
Dala 38', 42'; Mabululu 66'	Report

Stade de la Paix, Bouaké
Attendance: 28,663
Referee: Dahane Beida (Mauritania)

27 January 2024
20:00

Nigeria	2–0	Cameroon
Lookman 36', 90'	Report

Felix Houphouet Boigny Stadium, Abidjan
Attendance: 22,085
Referee: Redouane Jiyed (Morocco)

28 January 2024
17:00

Equatorial Guinea	0–1	Guinea
	Report	Bayo 90+8'

Alassane Ouattara Stadium, Abidjan
Attendance: 36,340
Referee: Omar Artan (Somalia)

28 January 2024
20:00

Egypt	1–1 (a.e.t.)	DR Congo
Mohamed 45+1' (pen.)	Report	Elia 37'
Penalties
Abdelmonem (penalty scored); Mohamed (penalty missed); Marmoush (penalty scored); Kamal (penalty scored); Hany (penalty scored); Hegazi (penalty scored); M. Fathi (penalty scored); Hamada (penalty scored); Abou Gabal (penalty missed)	7–8	(penalty scored) Moutoussamy; (penalty missed) Masuaku; (penalty scored) Dianagana; (penalty scored) Silas; (penalty scored) Tshibola; (penalty scored) Kalulu; (penalty scored) Mbemba; (penalty scored) Inonga Baka; (penalty scored) Mpasi

Laurent Pokou Stadium, San Pédro
Attendance: 12,342
Referee: Abongile Tom (South Africa)

29 January 2024
17:00

Cape Verde	1–0	Mauritania
Mendes 88' (pen.)	Report

Felix Houphouet Boigny Stadium, Abidjan
Attendance: 16,088
Referee: Mohamed Adel (Egypt)

29 January 2024
20:00

Senegal	1–1 (a.e.t.)	Ivory Coast
H. Diallo 4'	Report	Kessié 86' (pen.)
Penalties
Koulibaly (penalty scored); P. Sarr (penalty scored); Niakhaté (penalty missed); Dieng (penalty scored); Mané (penalty scored)	4–5	(penalty scored) Pépé; (penalty scored) Kouamé; (penalty scored) Haller; (penalty scored) Aurier; (penalty scored) Kessié

Charles Konan Banny Stadium, Yamoussoukro
Attendance: 19,948
Referee: Pierre Atcho (Gabon)

30 January 2024
17:00

Mali	2–1	Burkina Faso
E. Tapsoba 3' (o.g.); Sinayoko 47'	Report	Traoré 57' (pen.)

Amadou Gon Coulibaly Stadium, Korhogo
Attendance: 19,184
Referee: Mutaz Ibrahim (Libya)

30 January 2024
20:00

Morocco	0–2	South Africa
	Report	Makgopa 57'; Mokoena 90+5'

Laurent Pokou Stadium, San Pédro
Attendance: 19,078
Referee: Mahmood Ismail (Sudan)

=== Quarter-finals ===
2 February 2024
17:00

Nigeria	1–0	Angola
Lookman 41'	Report

Felix Houphouet Boigny Stadium, Abidjan
Attendance: 18,757
Referee: Issa Sy (Senegal)

2 February 2024
20:00

DR Congo	3–1	Guinea
Mbemba 27'; Wissa 65' (pen.); Masuaku 82'	Report	Bayo 21' (pen.)

Alassane Ouattara Stadium, Abidjan
Attendance: 33,278
Referee: Mustapha Ghorbal (Algeria)

3 February 2024
17:00

Mali	1–2 (a.e.t.)	Ivory Coast
Nene 71'	Report	Adingra 90'; Diakité 120+2'

Stade de la Paix, Bouaké
Attendance: 39,836
Referee: Mohamed Adel (Egypt)

3 February 2024
20:00

Cape Verde	0–0 (a.e.t.)	South Africa
	Report
Penalties
Bebé (penalty missed); Semedo (penalty missed); L. Duarte (penalty missed); Teixeira (penalty scored); Andrade (penalty missed)	1–2	(penalty scored) Mokoena; (penalty missed) Lepasa; (penalty missed) Modiba; (penalty scored) Mvala

Charles Konan Banny Stadium, Yamoussoukro
Attendance: 12,162
Referee: Jean-Jacques Ndala (DR Congo)

=== Semi-finals ===
7 February 2024
17:00

Nigeria	1–1 (a.e.t.)	South Africa
Troost-Ekong 67' (pen.)	Report	Mokoena 90' (pen.)
Penalties
Moffi (penalty scored); Omeruo (penalty scored); Aina (penalty missed); Troost-Ekong (penalty scored); Iheanacho (penalty scored)	4–2	(penalty missed) Mokoena; (penalty scored) Mayambela; (penalty missed) Makgopa; (penalty scored) Mvala

Stade de la Paix, Bouaké
Attendance: 31,227
Referee: Amin Omar (Egypt)

7 February 2024
20:00

Ivory Coast	1–0	DR Congo
Haller 65'	Report

Alassane Ouattara Stadium, Abidjan
Attendance: 51,020
Referee: Mutaz Ibrahim (Libya)

=== Third place play-off ===
10 February 2024
20:00

South Africa	0–0	DR Congo
	Report
Penalties
Mokoena (penalty missed); Sibisi (penalty scored); Monare (penalty scored); Modiba (penalty scored); Lepasa (penalty scored); Appollis (penalty scored); Xulu (penalty scored)	6–5	(penalty scored) Moutoussamy; (penalty scored) Mfulu; (penalty scored) Bakambu; (penalty scored) Kayembe; (penalty missed) Mbemba; (penalty scored) Wissa; (penalty missed) Elia

Felix Houphouet Boigny Stadium, Abidjan
Attendance: 21,975
Referee: Bamlak Tessema Weyesa (Ethiopia)

=== Final ===
11 February 2024
20:00

Nigeria	1–2	Ivory Coast
Troost-Ekong 38'	Report	Kessié 62'; Haller 81'

Alassane Ouattara Stadium, Abidjan
Attendance: 57,094
Referee: Dahane Beida (Mauritania)

== Statistics ==
=== Goalscorers ===
There were 119 goals scored in 52 matches, for an average of 2.29 goals per match.

5 goals

- (Equatorial Guinea) Emilio Nsue

4 goals

- (Angola) Gelson Dala
- (Egypt) Mostafa Mohamed

3 goals

- (Algeria) Baghdad Bounedjah
- (Angola) Mabululu
- (Burkina Faso) Bertrand Traoré
- (Guinea) Mohamed Bayo
- (Mali) Lassine Sinayoko
- (Nigeria) Ademola Lookman
- (Nigeria) William Troost-Ekong

2 goals

- (Cape Verde) Ryan Mendes
- (Democratic Republic of the Congo) Yoane Wissa
- (Ghana) Jordan Ayew
- (Ghana) Mohammed Kudus
- (Ivory Coast) Sébastien Haller
- (Ivory Coast) Franck Kessié
- (Senegal) Lamine Camara
- (Senegal) Habib Diallo
- (South Africa) Teboho Mokoena
- (South Africa) Themba Zwane

1 goal

- (Angola) Gilberto
- (Angola) Zini
- (Burkina Faso) Mohamed Konaté
- (Cameroon) Jean-Charles Castelletto
- (Cameroon) Frank Magri
- (Cameroon) Karl Toko Ekambi
- (Cameroon) Christopher Wooh
- (Cape Verde) Bebé
- (Cape Verde) Jamiro Monteiro
- (Cape Verde) Kevin Pina
- (Cape Verde) Garry Rodrigues
- (Cape Verde) Gilson Tavares
- (Cape Verde) Bryan Teixeira
- (Democratic Republic of the Congo) Meschak Elia
- (Democratic Republic of the Congo) Arthur Masuaku
- (Democratic Republic of the Congo) Chancel Mbemba
- (Democratic Republic of the Congo) Silas Katompa Mvumpa
- (Egypt) Omar Marmoush
- (Egypt) Mohamed Salah
- (Egypt) Trézéguet
- (Equatorial Guinea) Jannick Buyla
- (Equatorial Guinea) Pablo Ganet
- (Equatorial Guinea) Josete Miranda
- (Equatorial Guinea) Iban Salvador
- (The Gambia) Ebrima Colley
- (The Gambia) Ablie Jallow
- (Ghana) Alexander Djiku
- (Guinea) Aguibou Camara
- (Guinea-Bissau) Zé Turbo
- (Ivory Coast) Simon Adingra
- (Ivory Coast) Oumar Diakité
- (Ivory Coast) Seko Fofana
- (Ivory Coast) Jean-Philippe Krasso
- (Mali) Dorgeles Nene
- (Mali) Hamari Traoré
- (Mauritania) Sidi Bouna Amar
- (Mauritania) Mohamed Dellahi Yali
- (Mauritania) Aboubakary Koita
- (Morocco) Youssef En-Nesyri
- (Morocco) Achraf Hakimi
- (Morocco) Azzedine Ounahi
- (Morocco) Romain Saïss
- (Morocco) Hakim Ziyech
- (Mozambique) Geny Catamo
- (Mozambique) Clésio
- (Mozambique) Reinildo Mandava
- (Mozambique) Witi
- (Namibia) Deon Hotto
- (Nigeria) Victor Osimhen
- (Senegal) Pape Gueye
- (Senegal) Sadio Mané
- (Senegal) Iliman Ndiaye
- (Senegal) Ismaïla Sarr
- (Senegal) Abdoulaye Seck
- (South Africa) Evidence Makgopa
- (South Africa) Thapelo Maseko
- (South Africa) Percy Tau
- (Tanzania) Simon Msuva
- (Tunisia) Hamza Rafia
- (Zambia) Patson Daka
- (Zambia) Kings Kangwa

1 own goal

- (Burkina Faso) Edmond Tapsoba (against Mali)
- (Equatorial Guinea) Esteban Obiang (against Guinea-Bissau)
- (The Gambia) James Gomez (against Cameroon)
- (Guinea-Bissau) Opa Sanganté (against Nigeria)

Source: CAF

=== Discipline ===
A player was automatically suspended for the next match for the following offences:

- Receiving a red card (red card suspensions could be extended for serious offences)
- Receiving two yellow cards in two matches

After the end of the group matches, all cautions received were cancelled for the rest of the competition. Nevertheless, a player having collected two yellow cards sustained the one match suspension.

The following suspensions occurred during the tournament:

Player(s)/Official(s)	Offence(s)	Suspension(s)
Qualification suspensions
(Algeria) Mohamed Amoura	(yellow card) in 2023 Afcon qualification Group F vs Tanzania (matchday 2; 8 June 2022); (yellow card) in 2023 Afcon qualification Group F vs Tanzania (matchday 6; 7 September 2023)	Group D vs Angola (matchday 1; 15 January 2024)
Group stage suspensions
(Guinea) François Kamano	(red card) in Group C vs Cameroon (matchday 1; 15 January 2024)	Group C vs Gambia (matchday 2; 19 January 2024)
(Tanzania) Novatus Dismas	(yellow card) (yellow-red card) in Group F vs Morocco (matchday 1; 17 January 2024)	Group F vs Zambia (matchday 2; 21 January 2024)
(Senegal) Abdou Diallo	(yellow card) in Group C vs Gambia (matchday 1; 15 January 2024); (yellow card) in Group C vs Cameroon (matchday 2; 19 January 2024)	Group C vs Guinea (matchday 3; 23 January 2024)
(Algeria) Ramy Bensebaini	(yellow card) in Group D vs Angola (matchday 1; 15 January 2024); (yellow card) in Group D vs Burkina Faso (matchday 2; 20 January 2024)	Group D vs Mauritania (matchday 3; 23 January 2024)
(Angola) Núrio Fortuna	(yellow card) in Group D vs Algeria (matchday 1; 15 January 2024); (yellow card) in Group D vs Mauritania (matchday 2; 20 January 2024)	Group D vs Burkina Faso (matchday 3; 23 January 2024)
(Burkina Faso) Mohamed Konaté	(yellow card) in Group D vs Mauritania (matchday 1; 16 January 2024); (yellow card) in Group D vs Algeria (matchday 2; 20 January 2024)	Group D vs Angola (matchday 3; 23 January 2024)
(Burkina Faso) Blati Touré	(yellow card) in Group D vs Mauritania (matchday 1; 16 January 2024); (yellow card) in Group D vs Algeria (matchday 2; 20 January 2024)	Group D vs Angola (matchday 3; 23 January 2024)
(Zambia) Rodrick Kabwe	(yellow card) (yellow-red card) in Group F vs Tanzania (matchday 2; 21 January 2024)	Group F vs Morocco (matchday 3; 24 January 2024)
Knockout stage suspensions
(Namibia) Lubeni Haukongo	(yellow card) (yellow-red card) in Round of 16 vs Angola (27 January 2024)	Suspension to be served outside the tournament
(Equatorial Guinea) Federico Bikoro	(yellow card) in Group A vs Nigeria (matchday 1; 14 January 2024); (red card) in Round of 16 vs Guinea (28 January 2024)	Suspension to be served outside the tournament
(Egypt) Mohamed Hamdy	(yellow card) (yellow-red card) in Round of 16 vs DR Congo (28 January 2024)	Suspension to be served outside the tournament
(Morocco) Sofyan Amrabat	(yellow card) (red card) in Round of 16 vs South Africa (30 January 2024)	Suspension to be served outside the tournament
(Ivory Coast) Odilon Kossounou	(yellow card) (yellow-red card) in Quarter-final vs Mali (3 February 2024)	Semi-final vs DR Congo (7 February 2024)
(Ivory Coast) Christian Kouamé	(yellow card) in Round of 16 vs Senegal (29 January 2024); (yellow card) in Quarter-final vs Mali (3 February 2024)	Semi-final vs DR Congo (7 February 2024)
(Ivory Coast) Serge Aurier	(yellow card) in Round of 16 vs Senegal (29 January 2024); (yellow card) in Quarter-final vs Mali (3 February 2024)	Semi-final vs DR Congo (7 February 2024)
(Ivory Coast) Oumar Diakité	(yellow card) (yellow-red card) in Quarter-final vs Mali (3 February 2024)	Semi-final vs DR Congo (7 February 2024)
(Mali) Hamari Traoré	(red card) in Quarter-final vs Ivory Coast (3 February 2024)	Suspension to be served outside the tournament
(Nigeria) Ola Aina	(yellow card) in Round of 16 vs Cameroon (27 January 2024); (yellow card) in Final vs Ivory Coast (11 February 2024)	Suspension to be served outside the tournament

=== Final ranking ===
Matches that ended in extra time were counted as wins and defeats, while matches that ended in a penalty shoot-out were counted as draws.

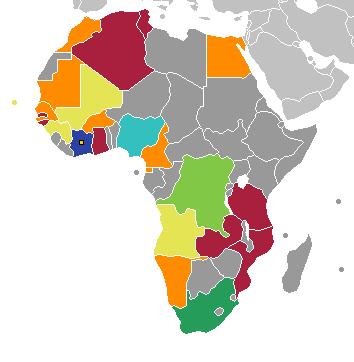
Result of teams participating in 2023 Africa Cup of Nations: Champion Runner-up Third place / Fourth place Quarter-finals Round of 16 / Group stage

Pos.	Team	G	Pld	W	D	L	Pts	GF	GA	GD
1	Ivory Coast	A	7	4	1	2	13	8	8	0
2	Nigeria	A	7	4	2	1	14	8	4	+4
3	South Africa	E	7	2	4	1	10	7	3	+4
4	DR Congo	F	7	1	5	1	8	6	5	+1
Eliminated in the quarter-finals
5	Cape Verde	B	5	3	2	0	11	8	3	+5
6	Angola	D	5	3	1	1	10	9	4	+5
7	Mali	E	5	2	2	1	8	6	4	+2
8	Guinea	C	5	2	1	2	7	4	6	−2
Eliminated in the round of 16
9	Senegal	C	4	3	1	0	10	9	2	+7
10	Equatorial Guinea	A	4	2	1	1	7	9	4	+5
11	Morocco	F	4	2	1	1	7	5	3	+2
12	Egypt	B	4	0	4	0	4	7	7	0
13	Burkina Faso	D	4	1	1	2	4	4	6	−2
14	Cameroon	C	4	1	1	2	4	5	8	−3
15	Namibia	E	4	1	1	2	4	1	7	−6
16	Mauritania	D	4	1	0	3	3	3	5	−2
Eliminated in the group stage
17	Ghana	B	3	0	2	1	2	5	6	−1
18	Algeria	D	3	0	2	1	2	3	4	−1
19	Zambia	F	3	0	2	1	2	2	3	−1
20	Tunisia	E	3	0	2	1	2	1	2	−1
21	Mozambique	B	3	0	2	1	2	4	7	−3
22	Tanzania	F	3	0	2	1	2	1	4	−3
23	Guinea-Bissau	A	3	0	0	3	0	2	7	−5
24	Gambia	C	3	0	0	3	0	2	7	−5

== Awards ==
The following awards were given at the conclusion of the tournament:

Award	Winner	Ref.
Best Player	(Nigeria) William Troost-Ekong	
Golden Boot	(Equatorial Guinea) Emilio Nsue (5 goals)	
Best Goalkeeper	(South Africa) Ronwen Williams	
Best Young Player	(Ivory Coast) Simon Adingra	
Fair Play Award	South Africa	

=== Best XI ===
Goalkeeper	Defenders	Midfielders	Forwards	Coach
(South Africa) Ronwen Williams	(Nigeria) Ola Aina (Ivory Coast) Ghislain Konan (Nigeria) William Troost-Ekong (Democratic Republic of the Congo) Chancel Mbemba	(South Africa) Teboho Mokoena (Ivory Coast) Jean Michaël Seri (Ivory Coast) Franck Kessié	(Democratic Republic of the Congo) Yoane Wissa (Nigeria) Ademola Lookman (Equatorial Guinea) Emilio Nsue	(Ivory Coast) Emerse Faé

== Broadcasting ==
BBC Radio and RFi acquired audio broadcasting rights to this edition of the tournament.

Below is the list of the 2023 AFCON broadcasting rights holders:

=== CAF ===
Territory	Rights holder(s)	Ref.
Algeria	EPTV	
Angola	TPA	
Burkina Faso	RTB	
Cameroon	CRTV, Canal 2	
Cape Verde	RTC	
Chad	Télé Tchad	
(Democratic Republic of the Congo) Democratic Republic of Congo	RTNC	
Egypt	Ontime Sports	
Gabon	Gabon TV	
(The Gambia) Gambia	GRTS	
Ghana	GBC	
Guinea	RTG	
(Guinea-Bissau) Guinea Bissau	TGB	
Ivory Coast	RTI, NCI	
Kenya	KBC	
Malawi	MBC	
Mali	ORTM	
Morocco	SNRT	
Mozambique	TVM, TV Miramar	
Namibia	NBC	
Nigeria	NTA	
Senegal	RTS	
South Africa	SABC Sport	
Sub-Saharan Africa	New World TV, Canal+, StarTimes, SuperSport	
Tanzania	TBC, Azam TV	
Togo	TVT, New World TV	
Uganda	UBC, Sanyuka TV	
Zambia	ZNBC, Diamond TV	
Zimbabwe	ZBC	

=== Rest of the world ===
Territory	Rights holder(s)	Ref.
Andorra	LaLiga+	
Australia	beIN Sports	
Austria	Sportdigital	
Belgium	RTBF	
Bosnia and Herzegovina	Sport Klub	
Brazil	Band	
Bulgaria	Max Sport	
Canada	beIN Sports	
Croatia	Sport Klub	
Denmark	Viaplay	
Fiji	Mai TV	
Finland	Viaplay	
France	beIN Sports	
Germany	Sportdigital	
Iceland	Viaplay	
India	FanCode	
Iran	Persiana Sports, Poker TV	
(Republic of Ireland) Ireland	Sky Sports	
Israel	Sports Channel	
Italy	Sportitalia	
Kazakhstan	MEGOGO	
Liechtenstein	Sportdigital	
Luxembourg	Sportdigital	
(Arab League) MENA	beIN Sports	
Montenegro	Sport Klub	
Netherlands	Ziggo Sport	
New Zealand	beIN Sports	
North Macedonia	Sport Klub	
Norway	Viaplay	
Pacific Islands	Digicel	
Papua New Guinea	TV Wan	
Poland	MEGOGO	
Portugal	Sport TV	
Russia	Okko Sport	
San Marino	Sportitalia	
Serbia	Sport Klub	
Slovenia	Sport Klub	
Southeast Asia	BeIN Sports	
Spain	LaLiga+	
Switzerland	Sportdigital	
Sweden	Viaplay	
Turkey	TV8.5, S Sport, Exxen	
Ukraine	MEGOGO	
United Kingdom	BBC Three, Sky Sports	
United States	beIN Sports	

== See also ==
- 2023 AFC Asian Cup - simultaneous tournament
