= Themba Zwane =

South African soccer player (born 1989)

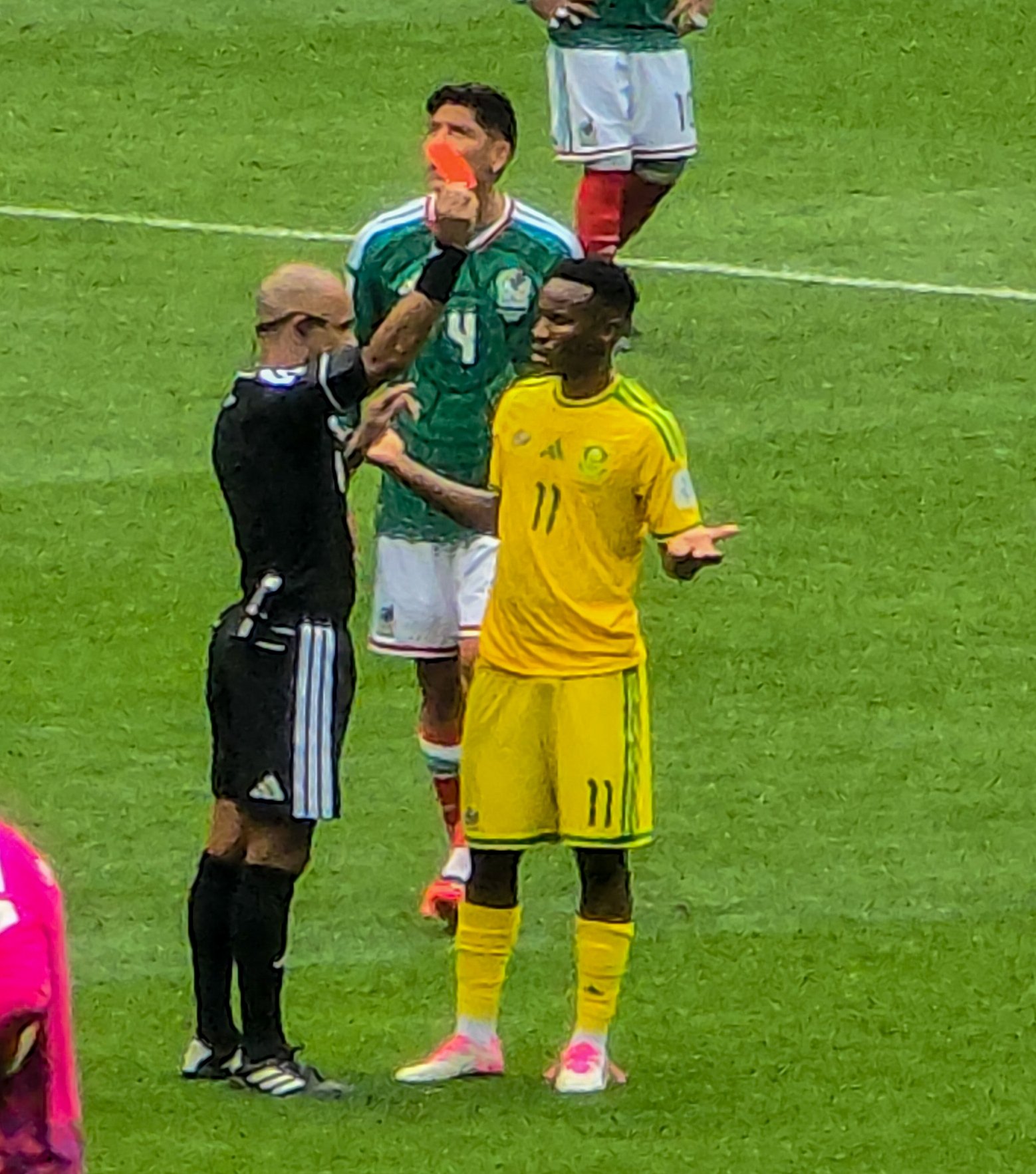
- Zwane (right) with South Africa at the 2026 FIFA World Cup

Personal information
- Full name: Themba Zwane
- Date of birth: 3 August 1989 (age 37)
- Place of birth: Tembisa, Gauteng, South Africa
- Height: 1.79 m (5 ft 10 in)
- Position: Attacking midfielder

Team information
- Current team: Mamelodi Sundowns
- Number: 18

Youth career
- –: M Tigers
- –: Vardos FC

Senior career*
| Years | Team | Apps | (Gls) |
| 2011– | Mamelodi Sundowns | 300 | (68) |
| 2013–2014 | → Mpumalanga Black Aces (loan) | 27 | (6) |

International career^{‡}
| 2014– | South Africa | 55 | (12) |
- * Club domestic league appearances and goals as of 16 August 2025 ‡ National team caps and goals as of 11 June 2026

Themba Zwane (born 3 August 1989), also known as Mshishi, is a South African professional soccer player who plays as an attacking midfielder for Premier Soccer League club Mamelodi Sundowns, which he captains and the South Africa national team.

== Playing career ==
Zwane joined Mamelodi Sundowns F.C. in 2011 from SAFA Second Division side Vardos F.C..

=== Loan to Mpumalanga Black Aces ===
During the 2013–14 season, Zwane spent a loan spell at Mpumalanga Black Aces, making 27 league appearances and scoring 6 goals, a period that helped accelerate his development before returning to Sundowns.

His success is highlighted by nine Betway Premiership titles, including the club’s record‑extending eighth consecutive championship in the 2024/25 season, as well as landmark continental triumphs such as the 2016 and 2025/26 CAF Champions League titles, the 2017 CAF Super Cup, and the 2023 African Football League.

He has lifted three Nedbank Cups, two Telkom Knockouts, and the 2021 MTN8, while also sweeping major individual awards during the 2019/20 season, including PSL Footballer of the Season. In 2020 he was the inaugural South African Football Journalist Association (SAFJA) Footballer of the Year.

Zwane also captained Sundowns at the 2025 FIFA Club World Cup, where the club recorded a 1 win, a draw and a loss to exit in the group stage.

On 29 May 2026, Zwane signed a contract extension with Sundowns.

== International career ==
On 11 October 2024 he earned his 50th international cap for South Africa.

In the opening game of the 2026 FIFA World Cup against Mexico, Zwane was shown a straight red card for violent conduct after slapping Roberto Alvarado. As South Africa are down to nine, they lost to Mexico 2-0. Meanwhile, Zwane was issued a three-match ban for the red card, meaning he would be next available for the round of 16 game had South Africa made it that far. Instead, they were knocked out by Canada in a 1-0 defeat during the round of 32.

== Personal life ==
Themba Zwane was nicknamed Mshishi due to his dribbling ability.

== Career statistics ==
=== Club ===
Appearances and goals by club, season and competition
| Club | Season | League | | | National cup | | League cup | | CAF Champions League | | Other | | Total | |
| Club | Season | Division | Apps | Goals | Apps | Goals | Apps | Goals | Apps | Goals | Apps | goals | Apps | Goals |
|---|---|---|---|---|---|---|---|---|---|---|---|---|---|---|
| Mamelodi Sundowns | 2010–11 | South African Premier Division | 0 | 0 | - | - | - | - | - | - | - | - | 0 | 0 |
| Mamelodi Sundowns | 2011–12 | South African Premier Division | 14 | 1 | 2 | 0 | 1 | 0 | – | – | – | - | 17 | 1 |
| Mamelodi Sundowns | 2012–13 | South African Premier Division | 11 | 0 | 0 | 0 | 1 | 0 | - | - | 0 | 0 | 12 | 0 |
| Mpumalanga Black Aces | 2013–14 | South African Premier Division | 27 | 4 | 1 | 0 | 1 | 0 | - | - | - | - | 29 | 4 |
| Mamelodi Sundowns | 2014–15 | South African Premier Division | 22 | 2 | 3 | 1 | 2 | 1 | 2 | 0 | 1 | 0 | 30 | 4 |
| Mamelodi Sundowns | 2015–16 | South African Premier Division | 22 | 3 | 3 | 1 | 4 | 2 | 9 | 0 | 1 | 0 | 39 | 6 |
| Mamelodi Sundowns | 2016–17 | South African Premier Division | 27 | 8 | 1 | 0 | 1 | 1 | 8 | 0 | 1 | 0 | 38 | 9 |
| Mamelodi Sundowns | 2017–18 | South African Premier Division | 27 | 6 | 4 | 0 | 1 | 0 | 7 | 0 | 1 | 0 | 40 | 6 |
| Mamelodi Sundowns | 2018–19 | South African Premier Division | 25 | 4 | 1 | 0 | 2 | 0 | 9 | 5 | 2 | 0 | 39 | 9 |
| Mamelodi Sundowns | 2019–20 | South African Premier Division | 25 | 11 | 3 | 0 | 2 | 0 | 8 | 2 | 3 | 1 | 41 | 14 |
| Mamelodi Sundowns | 2020–21 | South African Premier Division | 25 | 10 | 3 | 1 | – | – | 5 | 2 | 1 | 0 | 34 | 13 |
| Mamelodi Sundowns | 2021–22 | South African Premier Division | 25 | 5 | 4 | 1 | – | – | 10 | 3 | 3 | 1 | 42 | 10 |
| Mamelodi Sundowns | 2022–23 | South African Premier Division | 23 | 3 | 2 | 0 | – | – | 8 | 3 | 3 | 0 | 36 | 6 |
| Mamelodi Sundowns | 2023–24 | South African Premier Division | 18 | 0 | 3 | 1 | 0 | 0 | 10 | 0 | 10 | 1 | 41 | 2 |
| Mamelodi Sundowns | 2024–25 | South African Premier Division | 7 | 0 | 0 | 0 | 0 | 0 | 2 | 0 | 6 | 0 | 15 | 0 |
| Career total | | | 298 | 57 | 30 | 5 | 15 | 4 | 78 | 15 | 32 | 3 | 453 | 84 |

=== International ===
As of match played 11 June 2026

Appearances and goals by national team and year
| National team | Year | Apps | Goals |
|---|---|---|---|
| South Africa | 2014 | 4 | 0 |
| South Africa | 2015 | 2 | 0 |
| South Africa | 2016 | 0 | 0 |
| South Africa | 2017 | 8 | 1 |
| South Africa | 2018 | 2 | 0 |
| South Africa | 2019 | 7 | 1 |
| South Africa | 2020 | 3 | 2 |
| South Africa | 2021 | 2 | 0 |
| South Africa | 2022 | 3 | 2 |
| South Africa | 2023 | 6 | 1 |
| South Africa | 2024 | 14 | 5 |
| South Africa | 2025 | 0 | 0 |
| South Africa | 2026 | 4 | 0 |
| Total | | 55 | 12 |

Scores and results list South Africa's goal tally first.

List of international goals scored by Themba Zwane
| No. | Date | Venue | Opponent | Score | Result | Competition |
|---|---|---|---|---|---|---|
| 1. | 7 October 2017 | FNB Stadium, Johannesburg, South Africa | Burkina Faso | 2–0 | 3–1 | 2018 FIFA World Cup qualification |
| 2. | 13 October 2019 | Nelson Mandela Bay Stadium, Port Elizabeth, South Africa | Mali | 2–0 | 2–2 | Friendly |
| 3. | 16 November 2020 | Nelson Mandela Bay Stadium, Port Elizabeth, South Africa | São Tomé and Príncipe | 1–0 | 4–2 | 2021 Africa Cup of Nations qualification |
| 4. | 16 November 2020 | Nelson Mandela Bay Stadium, Port Elizabeth, South Africa | São Tomé and Príncipe | 3–2 | 4–2 | 2021 Africa Cup of Nations qualification |
| 5. | 24 September 2022 | FNB Stadium, Johannesburg, South Africa | Sierra Leone | 1–0 | 4–0 | Friendly |
| 6. | 24 September 2022 | FNB Stadium, Johannesburg, South Africa | Sierra Leone | 3–0 | 4–0 | Friendly |
| 7. | 17 October 2023 | Felix Houphouet Boigny Stadium, Abidjan, Ivory Coast | Ivory Coast | 1–0 | 1–1 | Friendly |
| 8. | 21 January 2024 | Amadou Gon Coulibaly Stadium, Korhogo, Ivory Coast | Namibia | 2–0 | 4–0 | 2023 Africa Cup of Nations |
| 9. | 21 January 2024 | Amadou Gon Coulibaly Stadium, Korhogo, Ivory Coast | Namibia | 3–0 | 4–0 | 2023 Africa Cup of Nations |
| 10. | 23 March 2024 | Nelson Mandela Stadium, Algiers, Algeria | Algeria | 1–1 | 3–3 | Friendly |
| 11. | 23 March 2024 | Nelson Mandela Stadium, Algiers, Algeria | Algeria | 2–1 | 3–3 | Friendly |
| 12. | 7 June 2024 | Godswill Akpabio International Stadium, Uyo, Nigeria | Nigeria | 1–0 | 1–1 | 2026 FIFA World Cup qualification |

== Honours ==
Mamelodi Sundowns

- South African Premier (9): 2015–16; 2017–18; 2018–19; 2019–20; 2020–21; 2021–22; 2022–23; 2023–24; 2024–25
- Telkom Knockout (2): 2015; 2019
- Nedbank Cup (3): 2014–15; 2019–20; 2021–22
- MTN 8 (2): 2021, 2026
- CAF Champions League (2): 2016; 2025–26
- CAF Super Cup: 2017
- African Football League: 2023
- FIFA African–Asian–Pacific Cup: 2026

South Africa

- Africa Cup of Nations third place: 2023

Individual

- PSL Footballer Of the Season: 2019–20
- PSL Player's Player of the season: 2019–20
- PSL Midfielder of the Season: 2019–20, 2020–21
- Mamelodi Sundowns Player of the season: 2019–20
- Mamelodi Sundowns' players player of the season: 2019–20
- PFA Player of the Year: 2020–21
- 2020 SAFJA: Footballer of the Year
