= Swakopmund FC =

Namibian football club

- Full name: Swakopmund Football Club
- Founded: 1929
- Ground: SFC-Stadion
- Manager: Tony Arjen Daugals
- League: First Division
- Website: https://www.facebook.com/SFCSwakopmund/

Swakopmund FC is a Namibian football club based in Swakopmund which currently plays in the First Division, the second-tier competition in the country. The team plays its home matches at the SFC-Stadion.

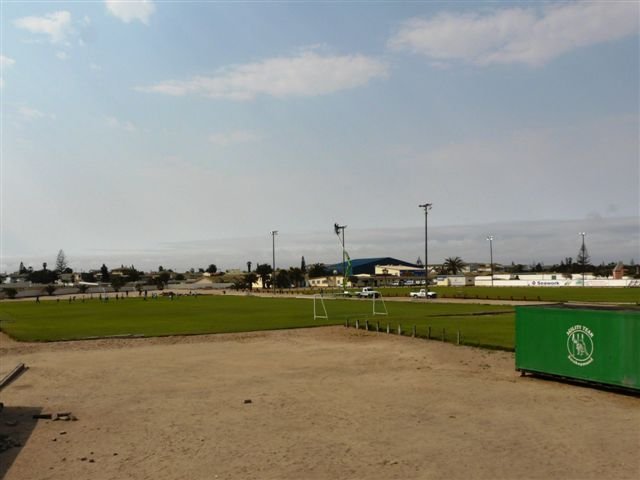
Swakopmund FC grounds in 2010

== History ==
The club was founded in 1929 by German colonists and is still owned and supported by German individuals and German clubs. In the past Schalke, Hertha BSC, and VfL Wolfsburg have provided financial support to the SFC.

The senior team earned promotion to the First Division for the first time during the 2009/10 season. In October 2018 SFC again earned promotion to the First Division. In May 2021 Namibian international and Blackburn Rovers player Ryan Nyambe held a two-day training camp at the club.

== Honours ==
- Second Division (Erongo): 2017/2018

== Notable former players ==
- (Namibia) Lubeni Haukongo
- (Namibia) Deon Hotto
