= Bethuel Muzeu =

Namibian footballer (born 2000)

Personal information
- Date of birth: 22 February 2000 (age 26)
- Place of birth: Omaheke Region, Namibia
- Height: 1.80 m (5 ft 11 in)
- Position: Forward

Team information
- Current team: Sekhukhune United
- Number: 9

Senior career*
Years	Team	Apps	(Gls)
2021–2022	Tura Magic		
2022–2026	Black Leopards	101	(44)
2026–	Sekhukhune United	3	(1)

International career^{‡}
2022–	Namibia	39	(6)
Medal record
Men's football
Representing Namibia
COSAFA Cup
Runner-up	2024 South Africa
- * Club domestic league appearances and goals as of 19:31, 21 September 2026 (UTC) ‡ National team caps and goals as of 16:08, 24 September 2026 (UTC)

Bethuel Muzeu (born 2 February 2000), also known as Muzeu Muzeu, is a Namibian footballer who plays for South African Premiership club Sekhukhune United and the Namibia national team.

== Club career ==
Muzeu represented his native Omaheke Region in the 2018 Namibian Newspaper Cup. By the 2021 Namibia Premier Football League season, he joined Tura Magic. As a member of Kasaona FA he was the top scorer of the 2022 Ramblers-Bank Windhoek U21 tournament staged at Ramblers Stadium in Windhoek. The team went on to win the inaugural tournament.

In July 2022 Muzeu joined Black Leopards F.C. of the South African National First Division after impressing at the 2022 COSAFA Cup. The contract was for one season with an option for an additional season if the club earns promotion to the South African Premier Division. After playing in pre-season matches with the club, head coach Joel Masutha compared Muzeu to fellow-Namibian in South Africa Peter Shalulile.

During the 2023–24 National First Division season, Muzeu finished tied for first in the league scoring race with seventeen goals. He shared the Golden Boot award with Prince Nxumalo of JDR Stars who also scored seventeen. Following the season, Black Leopards began shopping the striker to clubs in higher divisions for a reported transfer fee of R15 million. The club reportedly rejected an offer of R8 million earlier that season.

In summer 2026, it was announced that Muzeu had signed for South African Premiership club Sekhukhune United for the 2026–27 season after Black Leopards were relegated to the SAFA Second Division. Following a delay because of dispute over a transfer fee and issues with his work visa, Muzeu was cleared to play for Sekhukhune United in mid August 2026. He scored his first league goals for the club on 12 September 2026 in a 1–1 draw with Stellenbosch.

== International career ==
Muzeu represented Namibia at the youth level in 2019 Africa U-20 Cup of Nations qualification. He scored in the 1–1 second-leg draw with Botswana. However, Namibia was eliminated on away goals. He was named to Bobby Samaria's provisional squad ahead of 2023 Africa Cup of Nations qualification matches against Burundi and Kenya. In July 2022 Muzeu was named to Namibia's final roster for the 2022 COSAFA Cup by Collin Benjamin. He made his senior international debut on 12 July 2022 in the team's opening match, leading the offensive corps in a 2–0 victory against Madagascar. In Namibia's next match of the tournament, he scored the match-winning goal against Mozambique to send the nation to its fourth-ever COSAFA Cup final.

In January 2024, Muzeu entered a 2023 Africa Cup of Nations against Tunisia as a second-half substitute. He went on to assist on a goal by Deon Hotto which secured a 1–0 victory. The win was Namibia's first-ever in any edition of the Africa Cup of Nations. Later that year, he scored the game-winning goal of a 2–1 2024 COSAFA Cup match against Lesotho.

=== International goals ===
Scores and results list Namibia's goal tally first.

No.	Date	Venue	Opponent	Score	Result	Competition
1.	15 July 2022	Moses Mabhida Stadium, Durban, South Africa	Mozambique	1–0	1–0	2022 COSAFA Cup
2.	1 July 2024	Isaac Wolfson Stadium, Gqeberha, South Africa	Lesotho	2–1	2–1	2024 COSAFA Cup
3.	3 July 2024	Isaac Wolfson Stadium, Gqeberha, South Africa	Seychelles	1–0	3–1	2024 COSAFA Cup
4.	3 July 2024	Isaac Wolfson Stadium, Gqeberha, South Africa	Seychelles	3–0	3–1	2024 COSAFA Cup
5.	10 June 2025	Dr. Petrus Molemela Stadium, Bloemfontein, South Africa	Lesotho	2–0	3–0	2025 COSAFA Cup
6.	24 September 2026	Botswana National Stadium, Gaborone, Botswana	Congo	1–0	1–0	2027 Africa Cup of Nations qualification

=== International career statistics ===
As of match played 24 September 2026

Namibia national team
Year	Apps	Goals
2022	3	1
2023	8	0
2024	16	3
2025	9	1
2026	3	1
Total	39	6
