= Hamari Traoré =

Malian footballer (born 1992)

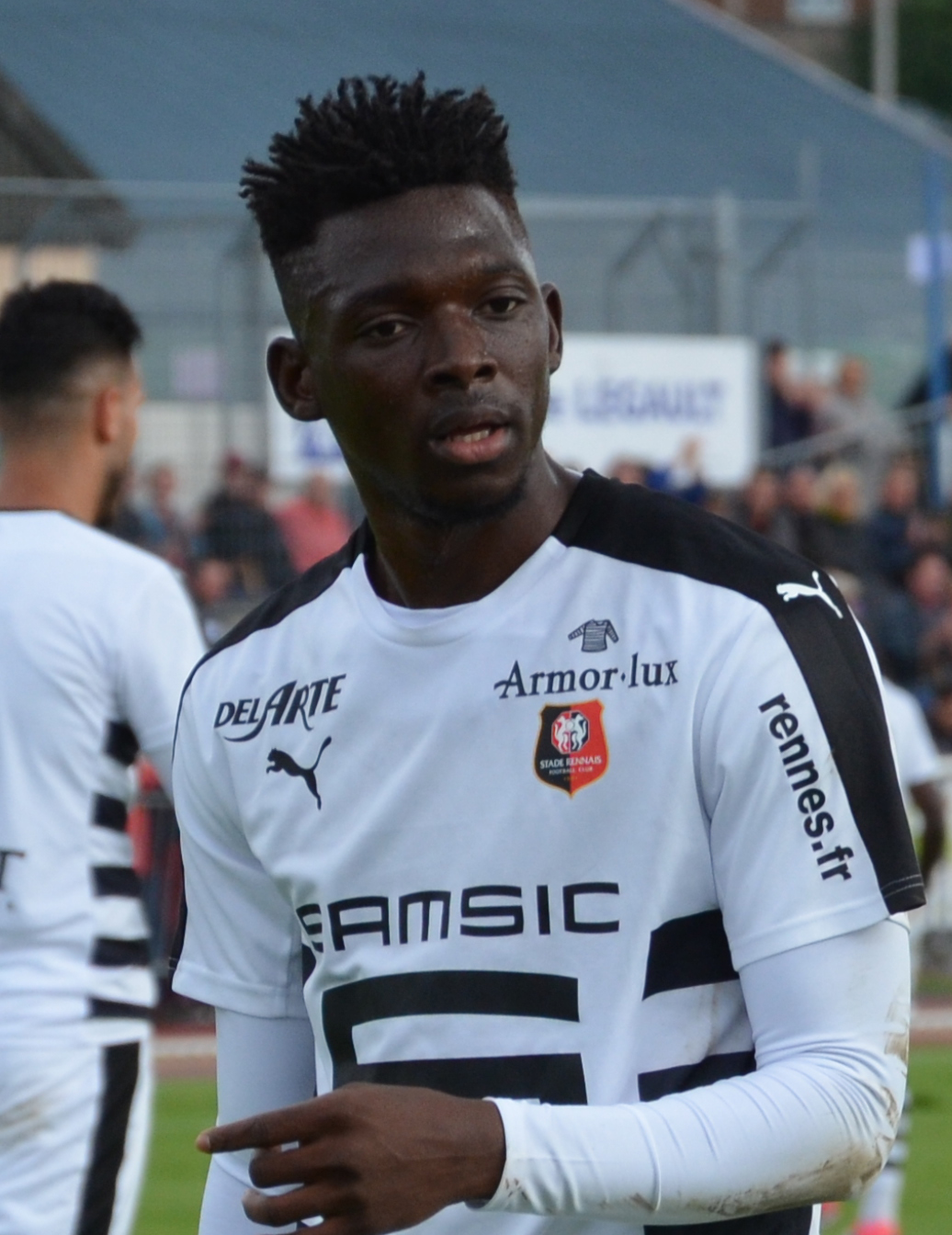
- Traoré with Rennes in 2017

Personal information
- Date of birth: 27 January 1992 (age 34)
- Place of birth: Bamako, Mali
- Height: 1.75 m (5 ft 9 in)
- Position: Right-back

Team information
- Current team: Paris FC
- Number: 14

Youth career
- 2011–2012: USFAS Bamako

Senior career*
Years	Team	Apps	(Gls)
2012–2013	Paris FC II	10	(0)
2012–2013	Paris FC	16	(0)
2013–2015	Lierse	48	(1)
2015–2017	Reims	64	(4)
2017–2023	Rennes	188	(5)
2023–2025	Real Sociedad	42	(0)
2025–	Paris FC	22	(0)

International career^{‡}
2015–	Mali	62	(3)
- * Club domestic league appearances and goals as of 19:14, 19 September 2026 (UTC) ‡ National team caps and goals as of 20:04, 29 September 2026 (UTC)

Hamari Traoré (born 27 January 1992) is a Malian professional footballer who plays as a right-back for Ligue 1 club Paris FC and captains the Mali national team.

== Club career ==
Traoré joined Lierse in 2013 from Paris FC. He made his Belgian Pro League debut on 30 October 2013 against Sporting Lokeren. He played the full game, which ended in a 1–0 away defeat.

=== Reims ===
In July 2015, Traoré, who was being courted by several clubs, chose to join Reims by signing a three-year contract. On 9 August 2015, he made his Ligue 1 debut as a starter against Bordeaux. In his second match, he scored the winning goal in a 1–0 victory at home against Marseille. Following Aïssa Mandi’s move into central defense, Traoré established himself on the right side of Reims’ back line.

=== Rennes ===
On 10 June 2017, Rennes announced that it had reached an agreement with Reims regarding his transfer. On 14 June 2017, he completed the move and signed a four-year contract.

During the 2018–19 season, he took part in his club's victory in the Coupe de France, defeating Paris Saint-Germain in the final 2–2, then 6–5 on penalties. It was a remarkable achievement, as it marked Rennes's first title in 48 years.

On 19 January 2020, Traoré scored his first goal for the Rouge et Noir in a Coupe de France match at the Stade Parsemain in Fos-sur-Mer against Athlético Marseille. On 7 September 2020, he extended his contract with Rennes until June 2023. During the 2020–21 season, he played in the UEFA Champions League for the first time, although Rennes were eliminated in the group stage.

Having become the team's captain, Traoré reached another milestone the following season by delivering 10 assists. He also surpassed the mark of 200 appearances for the Rouge et Noir.

=== Real Sociedad ===
On 9 June 2023, after six seasons with Rennais, Traoré signed with Real Sociedad on a free transfer, agreeing to a two-year contract with an option for an additional season.

On 2 September 2024, Real Sociedad announced that Traoré had suffered a torn cruciate ligament and would undergo surgery in the following days.

=== Return to Paris FC ===
On 1 September 2025, Traoré left Real Sociedad and signed a two-year contract with Paris FC.

On 5 February 2026, he underwent knee meniscus surgery and would miss several weeks of competition.

== International career ==
Traore was called up to the Mali national team and made his debut in a 4–1 friendly win against Burkina Faso.

In January 2017, Traoré was selected by coach Alain Giresse to take part in the 2017 Africa Cup of Nations held in Gabon. Two years later, he was again called up to participate in the 2019 Africa Cup of Nations in Egypt. In December 2021, he was selected by coach Mohamed Magassouba for the 2021 Africa Cup of Nations in Cameroon.

On 2 January 2024, he was included in the list of twenty-seven Malian players selected by Éric Chelle for the 2023 Africa Cup of Nations in Ivory Coast. On 27 June 2024, he was suspended by the Malian Football Federation for "incitement and dissent against Malian football."

On 11 December 2025, Traoré was called up to the Mali squad for the 2025 Africa Cup of Nations.

== Career statistics ==
=== Club ===
As of match played 19 September 2026

Appearances and goals by club, season and competition
Club	Season	League			National cup		League cup		Continental		Other		Total	
Club	Season	Division	Apps	Goals	Apps	Goals	Apps	Goals	Apps	Goals	Apps	Goals	Apps	Goals
Paris FC II	2012–13	CFA 2	10	0	—		—		—		—		10	0
Paris FC	2012–13	Ligue 3	16	0	0	0	—		—		—		16	0
Lierse	2013–14	Belgian Pro League	15	0	1	0	—		—		—		16	0
Lierse	2014–15	Belgian Pro League	33	1	1	0	—		—		4 (Note: Appearances in Belgian Pro League relegation play-offs)	0	38	0
Lierse	Total		48	1	2	0	0	0	0	0	4	0	54	1
Reims	2015–16	Ligue 1	33	2	1	0	0	0	—		—		34	2
Reims	2016–17	Ligue 2	31	2	1	0	1	0	—		—		33	2
Reims	Total		64	4	2	0	1	0	0	0	0	0	67	4
Rennes	2017–18	Ligue 1	30	0	0	0	3	0	0	0	—		33	0
Rennes	2018–19	Ligue 1	34	0	5	0	2	0	8 (Note: Appearance(s) in UEFA Europa League)	0	—		49	0
Rennes	2019–20	Ligue 1	27	0	5	1	1	0	4	0	0	0	37	1
Rennes	2020–21	Ligue 1	35	1	1	0	—		6 (Note: Appearances in UEFA Champions League)	0	—		42	1
Rennes	2021–22	Ligue 1	33	3	1	0	—		8 (Note: Appearances in UEFA Europa Conference League)	0	—		42	3
Rennes	2022–23	Ligue 1	31	1	2	0	—		3	0	—		36	1
Rennes	Total		188	5	14	1	6	0	29	0	0	0	239	6
Real Sociedad	2023–24	La Liga	31	0	2	0	—		7	0	—		40	0
Real Sociedad	2024–25	La Liga	11	0	1	0	—		1	0	—		13	0
Real Sociedad	Total		42	0	3	0	—		1	0	—		53	0
Paris FC	2025–26	Ligue 1	18	0	0	0	—		—		—		18	0
2026–27	Ligue 1	4	0	0	0	—		—		—		4	0	
Career total			392	10	21	1	7	0	37	0	4	0	461	11

=== International ===
As of match played 29 September 2026

Appearances and goals by national team and year
National team	Year	Apps	Goals
Mali	2015	1	0
Mali	2016	5	0
Mali	2017	7	0
Mali	2018	4	0
Mali	2019	7	0
Mali	2020	3	1
Mali	2021	8	0
Mali	2022	9	0
Mali	2023	7	1
Mali	2024	6	1
Mali	2025	1	0
Mali	2026	4	0
Total		62	3

Scores and results list Mali's goal tally first, score column indicates score after each Traoré goal.

List of international goals scored by Hamari Traoré
No.	Date	Venue	Opponent	Score	Result	Competition
1	9 October 2020	Emirhan Sport Center Stadium, Side, Turkey	Ghana	1–0	3–0	Friendly
2	17 October 2023	Estádio Municipal de Portimão, Portimão, Portugal	Saudi Arabia	2–0	3–1	Friendly
3	16 January 2024	Amadou Gon Coulibaly Stadium, Korhogo, Ivory Coast	South Africa	1–0	2–0	2023 Africa Cup of Nations

== Honours ==
Rennes

- Coupe de France: 2018–19
