= Lassine Sinayoko =

Malian footballer (born 1999)

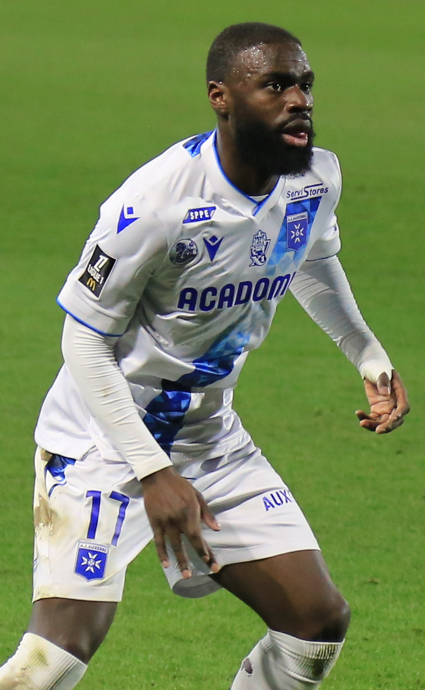
- Sinayoko with Auxerre in 2025

Personal information
- Full name: Lassine Sinayoko
- Date of birth: 8 December 1999 (age 26)
- Place of birth: Bamako, Mali
- Height: 1.86 m (6 ft 1 in)
- Position: Forward

Team information
- Current team: Paris FC
- Number: 9

Youth career
- Cosmo Taverny
- Entente SSG

Senior career*
Years	Team	Apps	(Gls)
2017–2021	Auxerre B	59	(23)
2021–2026	Auxerre	166	(29)
2026–	Paris FC	7	(6)

International career^{‡}
2021–	Mali	33	(11)
- * Club domestic league appearances and goals as of 21:16, 21 October 2026 (UTC) ‡ National team caps and goals as of 19:02, 29 September 2026 (UTC)

Lassine Sinayoko (born 8 December 1999) is a Malian professional footballer who plays as a forward for Ligue 1 club Paris FC and the Mali national team.

== Club career ==
Sinayoko started playing for Auxerre's reserve side in 2017. On 29 June 2019, he signed his first professional contract with the club. After the 2019–20 season in the Championnat National 3, Auxerre B finished top of Group E, and were promoted to the Championnat National 2, with Sinayoko playing a part in the promotion. On 10 April 2021, Sinayoko made his professional debut in a 4–0 Ligue 2 win over Niort. In the 2025–26 season, he became his club's top scorer with 12 goals in Ligue 1.

On 21 July 2026, Sinayoko signed a three-year contract with Paris FC.

== International career ==
On 16 August 2021, Sinayoko was called up to the Mali national team for the first time. He made his debut in a 0–0 FIFA World Cup qualification tie with Uganda on 6 September 2021.

On 2 January 2024, he was named in the list of 27 Malian players selected by Éric Chelle to take part in the 2023 Africa Cup of Nations.

On 11 December 2025, Sinayoko was called up to the Mali squad for the 2025 Africa Cup of Nations.

== Career statistics ==
=== Club ===
As of match played 18 October 2026

Appearances and goals by club, season and competition
Club	Season	League			Coupe de France		Europe		Other		Total	
Club	Season	Division	Apps	Goals	Apps	Goals	Apps	Goals	Apps	Goals	Apps	Goals
Auxerre B	2017–18	CFA	11	2	—		—		—		11	2
Auxerre B	2018–19	CFA	24	11	—		—		—		24	11
Auxerre B	2019–20	CFA	14	4	—		—		—		14	4
Auxerre B	2020–21	Ligue 3	9	6	—		—		—		9	6
Auxerre B	2021–22	Ligue 3	1	1	—		—		—		1	1
Auxerre B	Total		59	24	—		—		—		59	24
Auxerre	2020–21	Ligue 2	2	0	0	0	—		—		2	0
Auxerre	2021–22	Ligue 2	31	3	2	1	—		3 (Note: Appearances in Ligue 1 relegation/promotion play-offs)	0	36	4
Auxerre	2022–23	Ligue 1	33	1	2	0	—		—		35	1
Auxerre	2023–24	Ligue 2	34	8	1	1	—		—		35	9
Auxerre	2024–25	Ligue 1	34	5	1	0	—		—		35	5
Auxerre	2025–26	Ligue 1	32	12	0	0	—		—		32	12
Auxerre	Total		166	29	6	2	—		3	0	175	31
Paris FC	2026–27	Ligue 1	7	6	0	0	—		—		7	6
Career total			232	59	6	2	0	0	3	0	241	61

=== International ===
As of match played on 29 September 2026

Appearances and goals by national team and year
National team	Year	Apps	Goals
Mali	2021	4	0
Mali	2022	1	0
Mali	2023	5	2
Mali	2024	11	4
Mali	2025	8	4
Mali	2026	4	1
Total		33	11

Scores and results list Mali's goal tally first, score column indicates score after each Sinayoko goal.

List of international goals scored by Lassine Sinayoko
No.	Date	Venue	Opponent	Score	Result	Competition
1	13 October 2023	Stade du 26 Mars, Bamako, Mali	Uganda	1–0	1–0	Friendly
2	17 October 2023	Estádio Municipal de Portimão, Portimão, Portugal	Saudi Arabia	3–1	3–1	Friendly
3	6 January 2024	Stade du 26 Mars, Bamako, Mali	Guinea-Bissau	6–2	6–2	Friendly
4	16 January 2024	Amadou Gon Coulibaly Stadium, Korhogo, Ivory Coast	South Africa	2–0	2–0	2023 Africa Cup of Nations
5	20 January 2024	Amadou Gon Coulibaly Stadium, Korhogo, Ivory Coast	Tunisia	1–0	1–1	2023 Africa Cup of Nations
6	30 January 2024	Amadou Gon Coulibaly Stadium, Korhogo, Ivory Coast	Burkina Faso	2–0	2–1	2023 Africa Cup of Nations
7	12 October 2025	Stade du 26 Mars, Bamako, Mali	Madagascar	1–0	4–1	2026 FIFA World Cup qualification
8	12 October 2025	Stade du 26 Mars, Bamako, Mali	Madagascar	3–0	4–1	2026 FIFA World Cup qualification
9	22 December 2025	Stade Mohammed V, Casablanca, Morocco	Zambia	1–0	1–1	2025 Africa Cup of Nations
10	26 December 2025	Prince Moulay Abdellah Stadium, Rabat, Morocco	Morocco	1–1	1–1	2025 Africa Cup of Nations
11	3 January 2026	Stade Mohammed V, Casablanca, Morocco	Tunisia	1–1	1–1 (a.e.t.) (3–2 p)	2025 Africa Cup of Nations

== Honours ==
Auxerre B

- Championnat National 3: 2019–20

Auxerre

- Ligue 2: 2023–24
