= Lloyd Kazapua =

Namibian footballer

Personal information
- Full name: Lloyd Junior Jaseuavi Kazapua
- Date of birth: 25 March 1989 (age 37)
- Place of birth: Windhoek, South West Africa
- Height: 1.88 m (6 ft 2 in)
- Position: Goalkeeper

Team information
- Current team: Sekhukhune United

Senior career*
Years	Team	Apps	(Gls)
2011–2013	African Stars		
2013–2015	United Africa Tigers		
2015–2018	African Stars		
2018	Highlands Park		
2018–2019	Maccabi	6	(0)
2019–2020	Baroka	0	(0)
2020–2021	Cape Umoya United	16	(0)
2021–2024	Chippa United	36	(0)
2024–	Sekhukhune United		

International career^{‡}
2014–	Namibia	43	(0)
- * Club domestic league appearances and goals as of 9 August 2024 ‡ National team caps and goals as of 9 August 2024

Lloyd Junior Jaseuavi Kazapua (born 25 March 1989) is a Namibian professional footballer who plays as a goalkeeper for South African Premier Division club Sekhukhune United and the Namibia national team.

== International career ==
He made his Namibia national team debut on 4 January 2014 in a friendly against Ghana.

He was selected for the 2019 Africa Cup of Nations squad, followed by the 2023 Africa Cup of Nations squad.
