= Hamza Rafia =

Tunisian footballer (born 1999)

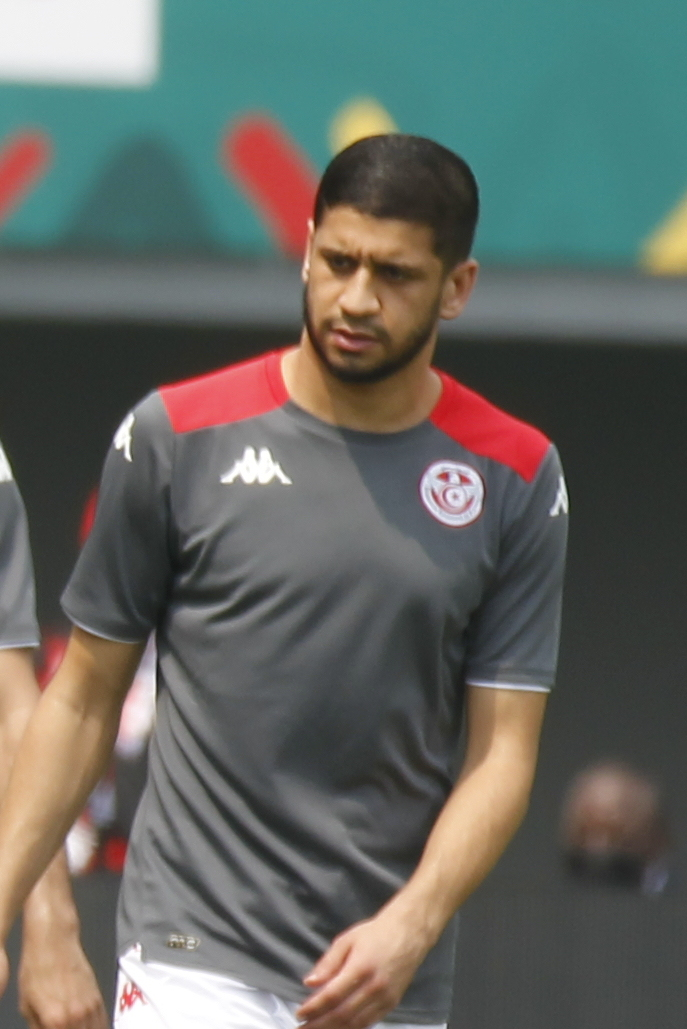
- Rafia in 2022

Personal information
- Date of birth: 2 April 1999 (age 27)
- Place of birth: Kalaat es Senam, Tunisia
- Height: 1.78 m (5 ft 10 in)
- Position: Attacking midfielder

Team information
- Current team: Espérance de Tunis
- Number: 8

Youth career
- 2005–2009: Bron Terraillon
- 2009–2010: Bron Grand Lyon
- 2010–2019: Lyon
- 2019–2021: Juventus

Senior career*
Years	Team	Apps	(Gls)
2016–2019	Lyon B	26	(5)
2019–2023	Juventus	0	(0)
2019–2023	Juventus Next Gen	57	(4)
2021–2022	→ Standard Liège (loan)	9	(0)
2022	→ Cremonese (loan)	12	(0)
2023	Pescara	12	(0)
2023–2026	Lecce	46	(1)
2026–	Espérance de Tunis	20	(1)

International career^{‡}
2016	France U17	1	(0)
2016	France U18	1	(0)
2019–	Tunisia	37	(4)
- * Club domestic league appearances and goals as of 22 November 2026 ‡ National team caps and goals as of 14 November 2024

Hamza Rafia (Arabic: حَمْزَة رَفِيعَة; born 2 April 1999) is a Tunisian professional footballer who plays as an attacking midfielder for Tunisian Ligue Professionnelle 1 club Espérance de Tunis and the Tunisia national team.

Born in Tunisia, Rafia initially represented France at youth level, before switching allegiance to his native country, making his senior debut for Tunisia in 2019.

== Early life ==
Born on 22 April 1999 in Kalaat es Senam, Tunisia, Rafia moved to France as a child and played in the youth sectors of Bron Terraillon, Bron Grand Lyon, and Lyon.

== Club career ==
=== Lyon B ===
Coming through the youth system, Rafia played for the reserve team of Lyon in the Championnat de France Amateur, the fourth division of French football. He made his debut on 28 May 2016, during the 2015–16 season, in a 4–3 home defeat to Moulins Yzeure Foot. His first goal for Lyon B came during the 2018–19 season, on 18 August 2018, helping his side win 5–2 against Monaco B. Rafia scored five goals in 18 league games throughout the season. In four seasons, he scored five goals in 26 games.

=== Juventus U23 ===
On 16 July 2019, Rafia joined Juventus on a three-year contract, for a fee of €400,000, which can reach €5 million in add-ons, and 20% on his future sale. Rafia played for Juventus' reserve team in the Serie C – Juventus U23 – making his professional debut in a 2–0 away loss to Novara in the league on 26 August 2019.

On 18 December, Rafia scored his first goal for Juventus U23 in a 2–1 away victory over Piacenza, in the quarter-finals of the Coppa Italia Serie C. He helped Juventus U23 win the tournament, scoring against Ternana in the final, which ended 2–1. During the 2019–20 season, Rafia played 20 games in the league, two in the promotion play-offs, and scored three goals and made three assists in the Coppa Italia Serie C. On 29 November 2020, Rafia scored his first goal in Serie C in a 2–1 away loss against Olbia.

=== Juventus ===
On 13 January 2021, Rafia made his senior debut for Juventus, coming on as a 77th-minute substitute in a Coppa Italia match against Genoa; he scored in the 104th minute, helping Juventus win 3–2 after extra time.

==== Loan to Standard Liège ====
On 18 August 2021, Rafia moved to Belgian side Standard Liège on loan.

==== Loan to Cremonese ====
On 31 January 2022, Rafia moved to Serie B side Cremonese.

=== Pescara ===
On 27 January 2023, Rafia signed a 2.5-year contract with Serie C club Pescara.

=== Lecce ===
On 18 July 2023, Rafia signed a three-year contract with Serie A club Lecce. He made his top-tier debut in their season opener against Lazio on 20 August 2023.

== Style of play ==
Rafia is an attacking midfielder also capable of playing as a right winger.

== International career ==
Rafia represented France at under-17 and under-18 levels, but decided to represent Tunisia at senior level. He made his senior debut on 6 September 2019, coming off the bench in a 1–0 friendly win over Mauritania.

== Career statistics ==
=== Club ===
As of match played 22 November 2026

Appearances and goals by club, season and competition
Club	Season	League			National cup (Note: Includes Coupe de France, Coppa Italia Serie C, Coppa Italia, Belgian Cup, Tunisian Cup)		Continental		Other		Total	
Club	Season	Division	Apps	Goals	Apps	Goals	Apps	Goals	Apps	Goals	Apps	Goals
Lyon B	2015–16	Amateur	2	0	—		—		—		2	0
Lyon B	2016–17	Amateur	0	0	—		1 (Note: Appearance(s) in UEFA Youth League)	0	—		1	0
Lyon B	2017–18	National 2	6	0	—		—		—		6	0
Lyon B	2018–19	National 2	18	4	—		7	3	—		25	7
Lyon B	Total		26	4	—		8	3	—		34	7
Juventus Next Gen	2019–20	Serie C	22	0	7	3	—		—		29	3
Juventus Next Gen	2020–21	Serie C	24	2	0	0	—		—		24	2
Juventus Next Gen	2022–23	Serie C	14	2	1	0	—		—		15	2
Juventus Next Gen	Total		60	4	8	3	—		—		68	7
Juventus	2020–21	Serie A	0	0	1	1	0	0	0	0	1	1
Standard Liège (loan)	2021–22	Belgian First Division A	9	0	2	0	—		—		11	0
Cremonese (loan)	2021–22	Serie B	12	0	—		—		—		12	0
Pescara	2022–23	Serie C	18	1	—		—		—		18	1
Lecce	2023–24	Serie A	28	1	1	0	—		—		29	1
Lecce	2024–25	Serie A	18	0	2	0	—		—		20	0
Lecce	2025–26	Serie A	0	0	0	0	—		—		0	0
Lecce	Total		46	1	3	0	—		—		49	1
Espérance de Tunis	2025–26	Tunisian Ligue Professionnelle 1	12	1	5	1	2 (Note: Appearances in CAF Champions League)	0	—		19	2
Espérance de Tunis	2026–27	Tunisian Ligue Professionnelle 1	8	0	0	0	2	0	—		10	0
Espérance de Tunis	Total		20	1	5	1	4	0	—		29	2
Career total			191	11	19	5	12	3	0	0	222	19

=== International ===
As of match played 14 November 2024

Appearances and goals by national team and year
National team	Year	Apps	Goals
Tunisia	2019	3	0
Tunisia	2020	4	0
Tunisia	2021	8	0
Tunisia	2022	4	0
Tunisia	2023	5	2
Tunisia	2024	13	2
Total		37	4

Scores and results list Tunisia's goal tally first, score column indicates score after each Rafia goal.

List of international goals scored by Hamza Rafia
No.	Date	Venue	Opponent	Score	Result	Competition
1	12 September 2023	30 June Stadium, Cairo, Egypt	Egypt	3–1	3–1	Friendly
2	17 November 2023	Hammadi Agrebi Stadium, Tunis, Tunisia	São Tomé and Príncipe	3–0	4–0	2026 FIFA World Cup qualification
3	20 January 2024	Amadou Gon Coulibaly Stadium, Korhogo, Ivory Coast	Mali	1–1	1–1	2023 Africa Cup of Nations
4	14 November 2024	Loftus Versfeld Stadium, Pretoria, South Africa	Madagascar	1–0	3–2	2025 Africa Cup of Nations qualification

== Honours ==
Juventus U23

- Coppa Italia Serie C: 2019–20

Juventus

- Coppa Italia: 2020–21

Espérance de Tunis

- Tunisian Cup: 2025–26
