= Kennedy Amutenya =

Namibian footballer

Personal information
- Birth name: Kennedy Given-love Vatileni Amutenya
- Date of birth: July 15, 1995 (age 31)
- Place of birth: Windhoek, Namibia
- Height: 1.89 m (6 ft 2 1/2 in)
- Position: Centre-back

Team information
- Current team: Jeddah
- Number: 95

Senior career*
| Years | Team | Apps | (Gls) |
| 2014–2017 | United Africa Tigers | | |
| 2017–2018 | Gaborone United | | |
| 2018–2019 | United Africa Tigers | | |
| 2019–2021 | Gaborone United | | |
| 2021–2022 | Cape Town Spurs | 7 | (0) |
| 2022–2023 | Gaborone United | | |
| 2024–2025 | United Africa Tigers | | |
| 2025 | Centre Chiefs | | |
| 2025– | Jeddah | | |

International career
| 2022– | Namibia | 15 | (0) |
- * Club domestic league appearances and goals

Kennedy Given-love Vatileni Amutenya (born 15 July 1995), is a Namibian professional footballer who plays as a centre-back for Saudi club Jeddah and the Namibia national team.

== Career ==
Amutenya began his senior career with the Namibia Premier League club United Africa Tigers in 2014, and helped them win the 2015–16 Namibia Premier League. In 2017, he had a year-long stint with Gaborone United in the Botswana Premier League before returning to the Tigers for another season. In 2019, again moved to Gaborone United again for a couple of seasons. On 31 August 2021, he moved to the South African National First Division club Cape Town Spurs. On 14 January 2022, he returned to Gaborone United for the third time on a 2.5 year contract, and in his time with them won the 2021–22 Botswana Premier League and 3 Botswana FA Challenge Cups. On 11 October 2023, he was suspended by Gaborone United for indiscipline.

On 11 September 2025, Amutenya joined Saudi FDL club Jeddah.

== International ==
Amutenya was first called up to the national team at the 2022 COSAFA Cup, where the team finished in second place. He was called up to the national team for the 2023 Africa Cup of Nations.

== Honours ==
United Africa Tigers

- Namibia Premier League: 2015–16

Gaborone United S.C.

- Botswana Premier League: 2021–22
- Botswana FA Challenge Cup: 2020, 2022, 2023
