= Mothobi Mvala =

South African soccer player (born 1994)

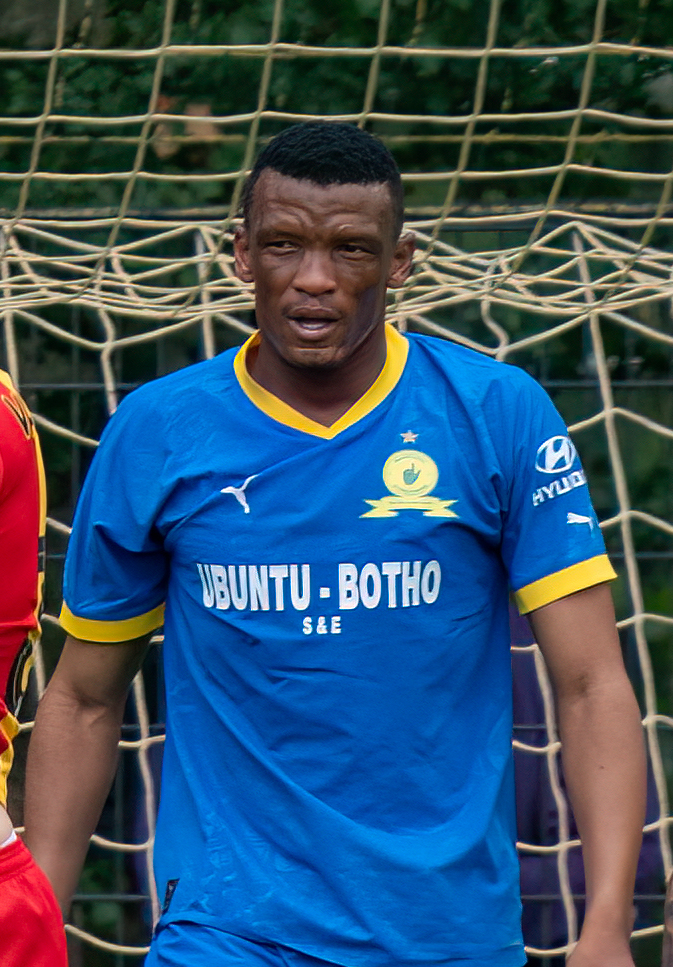
- Mvala (2023)

Personal information
- Date of birth: 14 June 1994 (age 32)
- Place of birth: Theunissen, South Africa
- Height: 1.82 m (6 ft 0 in)
- Position: Centre back

Team information
- Current team: Mamelodi Sundowns
- Number: 40

Youth career
- Berea Albion Academy
- –2014: Highlands Park

Senior career*
Years	Team	Apps	(Gls)
2014–2020	Highlands Park	145	(39)
2020–	Mamelodi Sundowns	75	(3)

International career^{‡}
2016–	South Africa U23	3	(0)
2017–	South Africa	20	(1)
- * Club domestic league appearances and goals as of 3 January 2026 ‡ National team caps and goals as of 23:54, 3 February 2024 (UTC)

Mothobi Mvala (born 14 June 1994) is a South African professional soccer player who plays as a defender for Mamelodi Sundowns and the South Africa national team. He represented the South Africa under-23 team at the 2016 Summer Olympics.

== Career statistics ==
=== International ===
As of matches played on 3 February 2024

Appearances and goals by national team and year
National team	Year	Apps	Goals
South Africa	2017	2	0
South Africa	2019	0	0
South Africa	2020	2	0
South Africa	2021	3	1
South Africa	2022	2	0
South Africa	2023	6	0
South Africa	2024	5	0
Total		20	1

== Honours ==
South Africa

- Africa Cup of Nations third place: 2023
