= Megogo =

Streaming television service in Ukraine

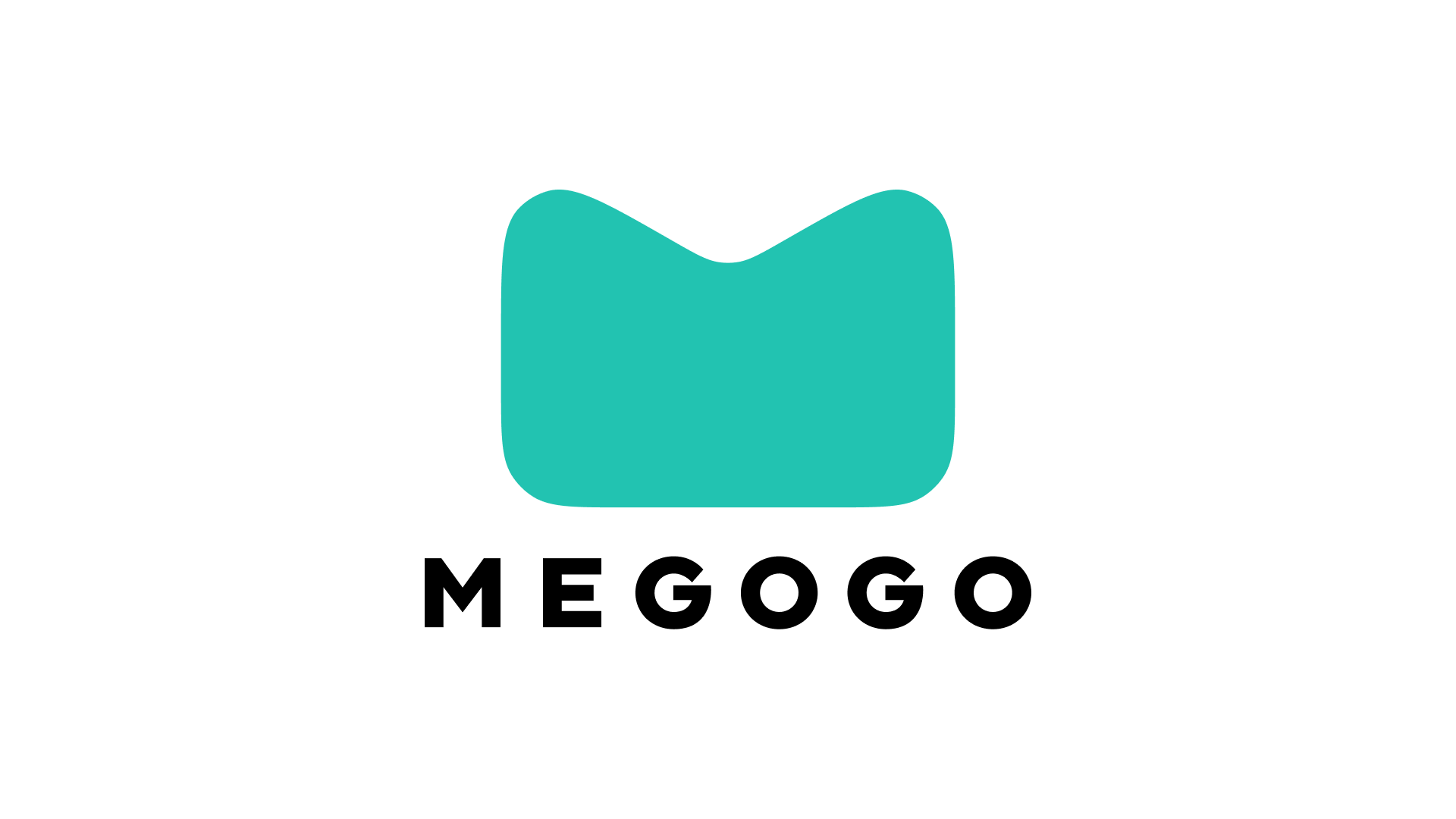
Megogo's Logo.

Megogo (stylized as MEGOGO, Ukrainian: Мегого) is an international OTT/VOD service based in Kyiv, Ukraine. It is the largest entertainment service in Eastern Europe with over 55 million users and a catalog of about 200 thousand hours of content: movies and documentaries, cartoons, series, TV programs and shows, sports broadcasts and cultural events, travel-shows, football matches, audiobooks, podcasts etc. It also provides streams of over 4000 local and foreign TV channels. FOX, Universal, Sony, Walt Disney, MGM, Miramax, Warner Brothers, Paramount Pictures, Blue Ant Media, Euronews, Discovery Communications, Scripps, Viacom. It is among the exclusive broadcasters of European football leagues La Liga, Ligue 1, Serie A, etc.

In July 2020, MEGOGO started the production of audiobooks, mostly modern Ukrainian literature and soon, in 2021, began to produce exclusive audio series.

In January 2021, MEGOGO announced that it had become the exclusive broadcaster of the UEFA Champions League, UEFA Europa League and UEFA Conference League matches for the 2021–2024 seasons in Ukraine.

Also in 2021, MEGOGO launched its own voice acting studio "MEGOGO Voice" with a focus on Ukrainian language.

== History ==
The service launched officially on November 22, 2011, in Kyiv, Ukraine. In March 2012, the number of visitors of the website hit 4.5 million. In April of the same year, the site of online movie theater was adapted for watching videos on iPod, iPhone and iPad devices.

In May 2012, MEGOGO opened offices in Belarus and Latvia. In June 2012, free access to MEGOGO was made available in the LG TVs with Smart TV. Also, the embedded video-player was created, which can be placed on any site and social network.

In November 2012, MEGOGO apps were launched for Panasonic's Smart Viera TVs and in the Windows Store. At this point the monthly number of users has reached 13 million. In January 2013, the monthly audience hit 17.5 million, and in February it reached 20 million.

In the beginning of 2014, MEGOGO has launched the TV section, where the broadcast of linear channels is streamed. In February 2015, the number of monthly unique users reached 32 million, when the service started streaming 4K content.

In 2015, MEGOGO launched the Pay TV. In May 2016, it began creating its own content. For example, a 28-episode cartoon series about the Cossacks.

At the end of 2015, it was launched virtual reality app for watching movies, which works on some models of mobile devices.

In July 2016, appeared the MEGOGO LIVE direction, which was engaged exclusively in live broadcasts of sport and cultural events. In 2018, the project was completely reformatted and was replaced by the youth music channel MEGOGO LIVE.

In October 2016, MEGOGO launched the social initiative "Look as you hear", that creates opportunities to view the world's best content for viewers with hearing impairments, adding sign language translation, as well as visual impairments, creating typhlocomments. All inclusive content is collected in a separate section. Also two separate interactive channels "Look as you hear" and "Cinema Sounds" were created.

In early 2019, on the platform appeared the sports channel – MEGOGO Football, which broadcasts matches and reviews of European championships: La Liga, Liga 1, Bundesliga, Premier League.

In December 2019, the company launched a new lineup, MEGOGO Audio, which offers audiobooks and podcasts. In May 2020, the media service opened the possibility for podcasters to download their own audio files. By now, in 2022, the section has more than 12 000 episodes of podcasts and more than 2000 fairytales for kids.

At the end of 2019, the company broadened the range of its activities to become a mediaservice for the whole family. Before MEGOGO has positioned itself as a video service of movies, series, cartoons, shows and TV. Currently the company has launched its own channels, audio content with podcasts and audiobooks, and creates its own content.

In 2020, Discovery and MEGOGO announced a partnership. As part of the cooperation, subscribers received access to the content of the Discovery+ online entertainment service.

In July 2020, MEGOGO signed a memorandum of cooperation with the Ministry of Digital Transformation of Ukraine.

In February 2021, the platform began creating audio series, the first of which tells about the Kureniv tragedy in Kyiv. There are currently 12 audio series available on the service.

As of February 2022, MEGOGO is the exclusive broadcaster in Ukraine of such sports events: matches of the UEFA Champions League, UEFA Europa League and UEFA Conference League, La Liga, Ligue 1, DFB-Pokal, Copa América and Brazilian Championship A Series, Top Rank fights, K2 Promotions Ukraine, Bellator and much more.

In February 2022, MEGOGO removed all Russian-made content and closed access to the service in Russia, suspending any of the Russian Federation.

Later, in April 2022, the company launched a new business-unit – MEGOGO Outsourcing. Now MEGOGO can provide its services to external companies in the areas of IT, live broadcasts, production etc.

In 2023, Megogo expanded its offer into Poland and Romania, providing popular TV channels through hybrid television.

== Сontent ==
Content is available in many languages, including Ukrainian, English, German, French, Latvian, Lithuanian, Estonian, Georgian, Turkish, Polish, Romanian etc.

In February 2013, the company signed a contract with the BBC and purchased 300 hours of video production, including the documentary “Planet of the Humans”, David Attenborough's “Frozen Planet”, and series “Luther”, “Sherlock”, and “Ghosts”.

In May 2016, MEGOGO started to create its own content.

In July 2020, service began the production of audiobooks, the first collections of short prose «Maybe Tomorrow» and «Abyss» by Ukrainian writer and director Marisa Nikityuk, voiced by the author.

In the fall of 2020, service announced the production of the series in partnership with 1+1 media. In December 2021, MEGOGO hosted a culinary show of its own production "Queen of the Kitchen" with host Olya Polyakova. Also in December MEGOGO released its own music and entertainment New Year's show with the participation of Ukrainian stars.

In 2020, the service announced the acquisition of exclusive rights to show the events of the American boxing promotion company Top Rank in Ukraine. Subsequently, MEGOGO began a strategic partnership with K2 Promotions Ukraine, founded by the Klitschko brothers. To viewers became available exclusive broadcasts of fights with the participation of Ukrainian titled professional boxers.

MEGOGO is developing sports direction and has a number of exclusive events. In January 2021, the company had received the rights from UEFA to show the seasons of the UEFA Champions League, the UEFA Europa League and the UEFA Conference League until 2024. For the first time in the history of Ukraine, the tender for showing matches of European clubs was won by OTT-service.
