= LaLiga+ =

Internet broadcasting platform based in Spain

- Website type: OTT streaming platform
- Available in: Spanish
- Headquarters: Madrid, {{{location_country}}}
- Country of origin: Spain
- Area served: Spain
- Owner: Liga Nacional de Fútbol Profesional
- Website: www.laligaplus.laliga.com
- Registration: Required
- Launched: 2019
- Current status: Active

LaLiga+ is an internet-broadcasting platform which offers live Spanish sports competitions through multiple devices. It was created by the Liga Nacional de Fútbol Profesional (LaLiga) in 2019.

== Development ==
Through an OTT service, which is standard for streaming film channels and series, LaLiga has created an internet-based television and video platform that offers coverage of Spanish sports competitions, in addition to several international competitions. It delivers both live and on-demand contents and allows users to personalise content for different devices such as tablets, mobile phones, computers and smart TVs.

The platform is seen by LaLiga as a means for supporting Spanish sports other than football and stimulating the sports industry in general, as a part of its commitment established in 2015 within the framework of the LaLigaSports project. Through the channel, Spanish sports federations are able to establish their own platform through which they can reach out to their fans and ascertain their preferences and consumption habits regarding these sports, and in doing so, allows them to design their own marketing and sponsorship strategies. The data collected as a result of these interactions facilitates a much more personalised recommendation of content for users.

The channel made LaLiga the first major European league to develop its own bespoke OTT service. The OTT platform can be accessed directly through smart TVs such as Samsung, LG, and Android TV, as well as allowing free and direct access from Orange TV. The digital ecosystem enables any user to access other LaLiga digital products.

The platform began broadcasting in March 2019, and is projected to occupy 50% of the market share by 2026. It has seen its implementation boosted due to the COVID-19 pandemic.

== Content ==
Users can access live broadcasts of a large majority of Spanish sports competitions for free.

Although the channel is intended to cover sports other than football, it is also possible to access summaries of LaLiga EA Sports and LaLiga Hypermotion matches, as well as different programs and specials mainly featuring football.

LaLiga EA Sports and LaLiga Hypermotion teams have gradually been establishing exclusive channels on LaLigaSports TV, such as Cádiz CF, CA Osasuna, or RCD Mallorca.

After downloading the application on available devices, users are able to watch the following competitions live: the Women's First Division of Football; the National Futsal League (LNFS), the ASOBAL Handball League, the LEB Gold Basketball League, among others.

In addition to the Spanish tournaments, international competitions such as the AFC Champions League, the Russian Premier Liga or the FIBA 3x3 World Tour basketball can be watched. Most of the sports have their own exclusive channels on the platform. This is the case of athletics, sports dancing, basketball, handball, boxing, e-sports, soccer, futsal, golf, weightlifting, field hockey, karate, mountain and climbing, sailing, pelota, petanque, surfing, tennis, triathlon and volleyball, among many other competitions and sports.

The football content offered on demand include:

- LaLiga Nations: A 10-episode series that analyzes the impact that players from around the globe have had on LaLiga.
- LaLiga Clubs: A 6-episode series about the details of LaLiga Santander clubs.
- 90 years of stories: The 13 programmes each featured a footballer and focused on their personal lives and the records they achieved. The footballers featured include Lionel Messi, Paco Gento, and Diego Rodriguez.
- LaLiga Archives: A total of 24 programs contain reports on personalities, events, or historical feats of Spanish soccer over the more than 90 years of Liga.
- Historical summaries: 12-minute summaries of different LaLiga matches since the 1998-1999 season.
- Historic matches: Complete LaLiga matches since the 1998-1999 season.
- La Película del Clásico: 8 programs, 50 minutes long, on one of the eight Clásicos played since 2015/16 including previously unseen footage.
- Cambio de Banda: Juan Pablo Villamil, the lead singer of the Colombian pop band Morat, hosts a talk-show that features different LaLiga football players answering unconventional questions.
- Specials: Programs such as LaLiga Sube, LaLiga DetrásDeLasCámaras, LaLiga HoySeJuega, LaLiga VolverEsGanar or LaLiga QuédateEnCasa have captured the current affairs of the competition in times of pandemic.

In addition, interviews, programs, reports and documentaries on different sports such as surfing, petanque, golf, triathlon, tennis, basketball, boxing, snowboarding, among others, are also offered.
