= Lubeni Haukongo =

Namibian footballer

Personal information
- Full name: Lubeni Pombili Haukongo
- Date of birth: 24 September 2000 (age 26)
- Place of birth: Mondesa, Namibia
- Height: 1.88 m (6 ft 2 in)
- Position: Defender

Youth career
- 2010–2016: Swakopmund

Senior career*
Years	Team	Apps	(Gls)
2016–2017	Swakopmund		
2017–2019	Eleven Arrows		
2019–2021	Lille B	0	(0)
2021–2022	Chippa United	2	(0)
2022–2024	Cape Town Spurs	16	(1)
2024	Shamakhi	0	(0)

International career^{‡}
2021–	Namibia	7	(0)
- * Club domestic league appearances and goals as of 6 July 2024 ‡ National team caps and goals as of 1 August 2024

Lubeni Haukongo (born 24 September 2000) is a Namibian footballer.

== Club career ==
Haukongo began his career with hometown club Desert United. He then moved to Swakopmund FC at age seven and progressed through the age categories to the first team. The player then moved on to another Walvis Bay club, Eleven Arrows, where he played in the Namibia Premier League for two seasons.

In May 2018 he was spotted by a South African scout and was one of twenty four West African players invited to a trial in Morocco. Following the trial, Haukongo was invited to train with Lille OSC of the French Ligue 1 for four weeks. The transfer was finalized in March 2019. While with the club he played for its reserve side in the Championnat National 2, the fourth tier of the French football league system. Not long after joining the club he sustained an quad muscle tear injuries which sidelined him for almost one year.

In summer 2021 Haukongo joined Chippa United of the South African Premier Division for the 2021–22 season and was immediately named the club captain. The player cited a desire for more playing time following his recovery from injury as the reason for departing Lille at the end of his contract. He made his professional debut with Chippa United against Orlando Pirates on 18 September 2021.

Following one season with Chippa United in which he made only two appearances because of injury, Haukongo signed for Cape Town Spurs of the National First Division in July 2022. After an impressive 2023–24 South African Premier Division season that was ended by injury, Haukongo returned to Europe, signing for Shamakhi FK of the Azerbaijan Premier League.

== International career ==
Haukongo represented Namibia at the under-17, under-20, and under-23 youth levels. He was part of the squad that won the 2016 COSAFA Under-17 Championship.

He received his first senior call up for a friendly against Lesotho in 2018 but did not appear in the match. He was called up next in November 2021 for a 2022 FIFA World Cup qualification match against the Congo.

=== International career statistics ===
As of match played 27 January 2024

Namibia national team
Year	Apps	Goals
2021	2	0
2024	5	0
Total	7	0
