= Deon Hotto =

Namibian footballer

Personal information
- Full name: Deon Hotto Kavendji
- Date of birth: 29 October 1990 (age 36)
- Place of birth: Swakopmund, Namibia
- Height: 1.70 m (5 ft 7 in)
- Positions: Midfielder; left back; left winger

Team information
- Current team: Orlando Pirates
- Number: 7

Senior career*
Years	Team	Apps	(Gls)
–2011	Blue Boys		
2012–2014	African Stars		
2014–2016	Golden Arrows	31	(3)
2016–2018	Bloemfontein Celtic	60	(1)
2018–2020	Bidvest Wits	57	(11)
2020–	Orlando Pirates	147	(20)

International career^{‡}
2013–	Namibia	77	(12)
- * Club domestic league appearances and goals as of 3 January 2026 ‡ National team caps and goals as of 13 November 2024

Deon Hotto Kavendji (born 29 October 1990) is a Namibian professional footballer who plays as a midfielder for South African Premier Division club Orlando Pirates and the Namibia national team.

In May 2015, he scored two goals in the 2015 COSAFA Cup final to help Namibia win their first international trophy. Hotto is regarded as one of Orlando Pirates best player in the modern Era he has won 7 trophies with the team X4 MTN 8 trophies 2 Nedbank cups 1 Carling Cup 2024 Nedbank cup runners up 2021 CAF Confederatios cup runnersup

== Career statistics ==
=== International ===
As of 13 November 2024

Appearances and goals by national team and year
National team	Year	Apps	Goals
Namibia	2013	9	1
Namibia	2014	3	1
Namibia	2015	12	4
Namibia	2016	8	2
Namibia	2017	4	0
Namibia	2018	7	2
Namibia	2019	8	0
Namibia	2020	2	0
Namibia	2021	7	0
Namibia	2022	1	0
Namibia	2023	5	0
Namibia	2024	11	2
Total		77	12

Scores and results list Namibia's goal tally first.

No	Date	Venue	Opponent	Score	Result	Competition
1.	12 June 2013	Sam Nujoma Stadium, Windhoek, Namibia	Nigeria	1–0	1–1	2014 FIFA World Cup qualification
2.	10 September 2014	Sam Nujoma Stadium, Windhoek, Namibia	Swaziland	1–0	1–1	Friendly
3.	21 May 2015	Moruleng Stadium, Saulspoort, South Africa	Zimbabwe	2–0	4–1	2015 COSAFA Cup
4.	21 May 2015	Moruleng Stadium, Saulspoort, South Africa	Zimbabwe	3–0	4–1	2015 COSAFA Cup
5.	30 May 2015	Moruleng Stadium, Saulspoort, South Africa	Mozambique	1–0	2–0	2015 COSAFA Cup
6.	30 May 2015	Moruleng Stadium, Saulspoort, South Africa	Mozambique	2–0	2–0	2015 COSAFA Cup
7.	29 March 2016	Sam Nujoma Stadium, Windhoek, Namibia	Burundi	1–0	1–3	2017 Africa Cup of Nations qualification
8.	21 June 2016	Sam Nujoma Stadium, Windhoek, Namibia	Mozambique	2–0	3–0	2016 COSAFA Cup
9.	5 June 2018	Old Peter Mokaba Stadium, Polokwane, South Africa	South Africa	1–2	1–4	2018 COSAFA Cup
10.	13 October 2018	Estádio do Zimpeto, Maputo, Mozambique	Mozambique	2–1	2–1	2019 Africa Cup of Nations qualification
11.	16 January 2024	Amadou Gon Coulibaly Stadium, Korhogo, Ivory Coast	Tunisia	1–0	1–0	2023 Africa Cup of Nations
12.	10 September 2024	Orlando Stadium, Johannesburg, South Africa	Kenya	1–2	1–2	2025 Africa Cup of Nations qualification
