= Amadou Gon Coulibaly Stadium =

Football stadium in Korhogo, Ivory Coast

- Interactive map of Amadou Gon Coulibaly Stadium
- Location: Korhogo, Ivory Coast
- Coordinates: 9°24′35″N 5°37′44″W
- Owner: Government of Ivory Coast
- Capacity: 20,000
- Surface: Grass
- Field size: 105m x 68m

Construction
- Groundbreaking: September 2018
- Opened: September 2023
- General contractor: China National Building Material

Tenants
- CO Korhogo (2024–present); Ivory Coast national football team (selected matches)

Amadou Gon Coulibaly Stadium is a football stadium in Korhogo, Ivory Coast. The stadium has a capacity of 20,000 seats.

The construction began in September 2018 and ended in September 2023. The stadium is named after Amadou Gon Coulibaly, who was Prime Minister from 2017 to his death in 2020.

== History ==
=== 2023 Africa Cup of Nations ===
The stadium was one of the venues for the 2023 Africa Cup of Nations.

The following matches were played at the stadium:

Date	Time (GMT)	Team #1	Result	Team #2	Round	Spectators
16 January 2024	17:00	Tunisia	0–1	Namibia	Group E	13,991
16 January 2024	20:00	Mali	2–0	South Africa	Group E	16,894
20 January 2024	20:00	Tunisia	1–1	Mali	Group E	18,130
21 January 2024	20:00	South Africa	4–0	Namibia	Group E	9,304
24 January 2024	17:00	South Africa	0–0	Tunisia	Group E	12,847
24 January 2024	20:00	Tanzania	0–0	DR Congo	Group F	12,847
30 January 2024	17:00	Mali	2–1	Burkina Faso	Round of 16	19,184
