= 2026 FIFA World Cup knockout stage =

The knockout stage of the 2026 FIFA World Cup was the second and final stage of the competition, following the group stage. Played from June 28 to July 19, 2026, the knockout stage ended with the final, held at MetLife Stadium in East Rutherford, New Jersey. The top two teams from each of the twelve groups, along with the best eight third-place teams, advanced to the knockout stage to compete in a single-elimination tournament. There were 32 matches in the knockout stage, including a match for third place.

== Format ==
The knockout stage of the 2026 FIFA World Cup was contested between 32 teams that qualify from the group stage. Matches in the knockout stage were played to a finish. If the score of a match was level at the end of 90 minutes of playing time, 30 minutes of extra time were played. If the scores were still tied, a penalty shootout determined the team that prevailed. All times listed are local.

In the round of 32, four of the group winners played group runners-up. The other eight group winners played advancing third-place teams. The eight remaining group runners-up played against each other.

FIFA set out the following schedule for the round of 32:

- Match 73: Runner-up Group A vs Runner-up Group B
- Match 74: Winner Group E vs Third-place Group A/B/C/D/F
- Match 75: Winner Group F vs Runner-up Group C
- Match 76: Winner Group C vs Runner-up Group F
- Match 77: Winner Group I vs Third-place Group C/D/F/G/H
- Match 78: Runner-up Group E vs Runner-up Group I
- Match 79: Winner Group A vs Third-place Group C/E/F/H/I
- Match 80: Winner Group L vs Third-place Group E/H/I/J/K
- Match 81: Winner Group D vs Third-place Group B/E/F/I/J
- Match 82: Winner Group G vs Third-place Group A/E/H/I/J
- Match 83: Runner-up Group K vs Runner-up Group L
- Match 84: Winner Group H vs Runner-up Group J
- Match 85: Winner Group B vs Third-place Group E/F/G/I/J
- Match 86: Winner Group J vs Runner-up Group H
- Match 87: Winner Group K vs Third-place Group D/E/I/J/L
- Match 88: Runner-up Group D vs Runner-up Group G

=== Combinations of matches in the round of 32 ===
The specific matchups involving the third-place teams depended on which eight third-place teams qualified for the round of 32. The 495 possible combinations were published in Annex C of the tournament regulations.

The following eight groups had their third-place teams finish in the top eight of the ranking: B, D, E, F, I, J, K, and L. According to the combinations table (outcome #67), the matchups involving third-place teams were therefore as follows:

- 1A (Mexico) vs 3E (Ecuador)
- 1B (Switzerland) vs 3J (Algeria)
- 1D (United States) vs 3B (Bosnia and Herzegovina)
- 1E (Germany) vs 3D (Paraguay)
- 1G (Belgium) vs 3I (Senegal)
- 1I (France) vs 3F (Sweden)
- 1K (Colombia) vs 3L (Ghana)
- 1L (England) vs 3K (DR Congo)

The full combination table was as follows:

* Combination according to the eight qualified teams

Combinations of matches in the round of 32
No.	Third-place teams advance from groups												1A vs	1B vs	1D vs	1E vs	1G vs	1I vs	1K vs	1L vs
1					E	F	G	H	I	J	K	L	3E	3J	3I	3F	3H	3G	3L	3K
2				D		F	G	H	I	J	K	L	3H	3G	3I	3D	3J	3F	3L	3K
3				D	E		G	H	I	J	K	L	3E	3J	3I	3D	3H	3G	3L	3K
4				D	E	F		H	I	J	K	L	3E	3J	3I	3D	3H	3F	3L	3K
5				D	E	F	G		I	J	K	L	3E	3G	3I	3D	3J	3F	3L	3K
6				D	E	F	G	H		J	K	L	3E	3G	3J	3D	3H	3F	3L	3K
7				D	E	F	G	H	I		K	L	3E	3G	3I	3D	3H	3F	3L	3K
8				D	E	F	G	H	I	J		L	3E	3G	3J	3D	3H	3F	3L	3I
9				D	E	F	G	H	I	J	K		3E	3G	3J	3D	3H	3F	3I	3K
10			C			F	G	H	I	J	K	L	3H	3G	3I	3C	3J	3F	3L	3K
11			C		E		G	H	I	J	K	L	3E	3J	3I	3C	3H	3G	3L	3K
12			C		E	F		H	I	J	K	L	3E	3J	3I	3C	3H	3F	3L	3K
13			C		E	F	G		I	J	K	L	3E	3G	3I	3C	3J	3F	3L	3K
14			C		E	F	G	H		J	K	L	3E	3G	3J	3C	3H	3F	3L	3K
15			C		E	F	G	H	I		K	L	3E	3G	3I	3C	3H	3F	3L	3K
16			C		E	F	G	H	I	J		L	3E	3G	3J	3C	3H	3F	3L	3I
17			C		E	F	G	H	I	J	K		3E	3G	3J	3C	3H	3F	3I	3K
18			C	D			G	H	I	J	K	L	3H	3G	3I	3C	3J	3D	3L	3K
19			C	D		F		H	I	J	K	L	3C	3J	3I	3D	3H	3F	3L	3K
20			C	D		F	G		I	J	K	L	3C	3G	3I	3D	3J	3F	3L	3K
21			C	D		F	G	H		J	K	L	3C	3G	3J	3D	3H	3F	3L	3K
22			C	D		F	G	H	I		K	L	3C	3G	3I	3D	3H	3F	3L	3K
23			C	D		F	G	H	I	J		L	3C	3G	3J	3D	3H	3F	3L	3I
24			C	D		F	G	H	I	J	K		3C	3G	3J	3D	3H	3F	3I	3K
25			C	D	E			H	I	J	K	L	3E	3J	3I	3C	3H	3D	3L	3K
26			C	D	E		G		I	J	K	L	3E	3G	3I	3C	3J	3D	3L	3K
27			C	D	E		G	H		J	K	L	3E	3G	3J	3C	3H	3D	3L	3K
28			C	D	E		G	H	I		K	L	3E	3G	3I	3C	3H	3D	3L	3K
29			C	D	E		G	H	I	J		L	3E	3G	3J	3C	3H	3D	3L	3I
30			C	D	E		G	H	I	J	K		3E	3G	3J	3C	3H	3D	3I	3K
31			C	D	E	F			I	J	K	L	3C	3J	3E	3D	3I	3F	3L	3K
32			C	D	E	F		H		J	K	L	3C	3J	3E	3D	3H	3F	3L	3K
33			C	D	E	F		H	I		K	L	3C	3E	3I	3D	3H	3F	3L	3K
34			C	D	E	F		H	I	J		L	3C	3J	3E	3D	3H	3F	3L	3I
35			C	D	E	F		H	I	J	K		3C	3J	3E	3D	3H	3F	3I	3K
36			C	D	E	F	G			J	K	L	3C	3G	3E	3D	3J	3F	3L	3K
37			C	D	E	F	G		I		K	L	3C	3G	3E	3D	3I	3F	3L	3K
38			C	D	E	F	G		I	J		L	3C	3G	3E	3D	3J	3F	3L	3I
39			C	D	E	F	G		I	J	K		3C	3G	3E	3D	3J	3F	3I	3K
40			C	D	E	F	G	H			K	L	3C	3G	3E	3D	3H	3F	3L	3K
41			C	D	E	F	G	H		J		L	3C	3G	3J	3D	3H	3F	3L	3E
42			C	D	E	F	G	H		J	K		3C	3G	3J	3D	3H	3F	3E	3K
43			C	D	E	F	G	H	I			L	3C	3G	3E	3D	3H	3F	3L	3I
44			C	D	E	F	G	H	I		K		3C	3G	3E	3D	3H	3F	3I	3K
45			C	D	E	F	G	H	I	J			3C	3G	3J	3D	3H	3F	3E	3I
46		B				F	G	H	I	J	K	L	3H	3J	3B	3F	3I	3G	3L	3K
47		B			E		G	H	I	J	K	L	3E	3J	3I	3B	3H	3G	3L	3K
48		B			E	F		H	I	J	K	L	3E	3J	3B	3F	3I	3H	3L	3K
49		B			E	F	G		I	J	K	L	3E	3J	3B	3F	3I	3G	3L	3K
50		B			E	F	G	H		J	K	L	3E	3J	3B	3F	3H	3G	3L	3K
51		B			E	F	G	H	I		K	L	3E	3G	3B	3F	3I	3H	3L	3K
52		B			E	F	G	H	I	J		L	3E	3J	3B	3F	3H	3G	3L	3I
53		B			E	F	G	H	I	J	K		3E	3J	3B	3F	3H	3G	3I	3K
54		B		D			G	H	I	J	K	L	3H	3J	3B	3D	3I	3G	3L	3K
55		B		D		F		H	I	J	K	L	3H	3J	3B	3D	3I	3F	3L	3K
56		B		D		F	G		I	J	K	L	3I	3G	3B	3D	3J	3F	3L	3K
57		B		D		F	G	H		J	K	L	3H	3G	3B	3D	3J	3F	3L	3K
58		B		D		F	G	H	I		K	L	3H	3G	3B	3D	3I	3F	3L	3K
59		B		D		F	G	H	I	J		L	3H	3G	3B	3D	3J	3F	3L	3I
60		B		D		F	G	H	I	J	K		3H	3G	3B	3D	3J	3F	3I	3K
61		B		D	E			H	I	J	K	L	3E	3J	3B	3D	3I	3H	3L	3K
62		B		D	E		G		I	J	K	L	3E	3J	3B	3D	3I	3G	3L	3K
63		B		D	E		G	H		J	K	L	3E	3J	3B	3D	3H	3G	3L	3K
64		B		D	E		G	H	I		K	L	3E	3G	3B	3D	3I	3H	3L	3K
65		B		D	E		G	H	I	J		L	3E	3J	3B	3D	3H	3G	3L	3I
66		B		D	E		G	H	I	J	K		3E	3J	3B	3D	3H	3G	3I	3K
67*		B		D	E	F			I	J	K	L	3E	3J	3B	3D	3I	3F	3L	3K
68		B		D	E	F		H		J	K	L	3E	3J	3B	3D	3H	3F	3L	3K
69		B		D	E	F		H	I		K	L	3E	3I	3B	3D	3H	3F	3L	3K
70		B		D	E	F		H	I	J		L	3E	3J	3B	3D	3H	3F	3L	3I
71		B		D	E	F		H	I	J	K		3E	3J	3B	3D	3H	3F	3I	3K
72		B		D	E	F	G			J	K	L	3E	3G	3B	3D	3J	3F	3L	3K
73		B		D	E	F	G		I		K	L	3E	3G	3B	3D	3I	3F	3L	3K
74		B		D	E	F	G		I	J		L	3E	3G	3B	3D	3J	3F	3L	3I
75		B		D	E	F	G		I	J	K		3E	3G	3B	3D	3J	3F	3I	3K
76		B		D	E	F	G	H			K	L	3E	3G	3B	3D	3H	3F	3L	3K
77		B		D	E	F	G	H		J		L	3H	3G	3B	3D	3J	3F	3L	3E
78		B		D	E	F	G	H		J	K		3H	3G	3B	3D	3J	3F	3E	3K
79		B		D	E	F	G	H	I			L	3E	3G	3B	3D	3H	3F	3L	3I
80		B		D	E	F	G	H	I		K		3E	3G	3B	3D	3H	3F	3I	3K
81		B		D	E	F	G	H	I	J			3H	3G	3B	3D	3J	3F	3E	3I
82		B	C				G	H	I	J	K	L	3H	3J	3B	3C	3I	3G	3L	3K
83		B	C			F		H	I	J	K	L	3H	3J	3B	3C	3I	3F	3L	3K
84		B	C			F	G		I	J	K	L	3I	3G	3B	3C	3J	3F	3L	3K
85		B	C			F	G	H		J	K	L	3H	3G	3B	3C	3J	3F	3L	3K
86		B	C			F	G	H	I		K	L	3H	3G	3B	3C	3I	3F	3L	3K
87		B	C			F	G	H	I	J		L	3H	3G	3B	3C	3J	3F	3L	3I
88		B	C			F	G	H	I	J	K		3H	3G	3B	3C	3J	3F	3I	3K
89		B	C		E			H	I	J	K	L	3E	3J	3B	3C	3I	3H	3L	3K
90		B	C		E		G		I	J	K	L	3E	3J	3B	3C	3I	3G	3L	3K
91		B	C		E		G	H		J	K	L	3E	3J	3B	3C	3H	3G	3L	3K
92		B	C		E		G	H	I		K	L	3E	3G	3B	3C	3I	3H	3L	3K
93		B	C		E		G	H	I	J		L	3E	3J	3B	3C	3H	3G	3L	3I
94		B	C		E		G	H	I	J	K		3E	3J	3B	3C	3H	3G	3I	3K
95		B	C		E	F			I	J	K	L	3E	3J	3B	3C	3I	3F	3L	3K
96		B	C		E	F		H		J	K	L	3E	3J	3B	3C	3H	3F	3L	3K
97		B	C		E	F		H	I		K	L	3E	3I	3B	3C	3H	3F	3L	3K
98		B	C		E	F		H	I	J		L	3E	3J	3B	3C	3H	3F	3L	3I
99		B	C		E	F		H	I	J	K		3E	3J	3B	3C	3H	3F	3I	3K
100		B	C		E	F	G			J	K	L	3E	3G	3B	3C	3J	3F	3L	3K
101		B	C		E	F	G		I		K	L	3E	3G	3B	3C	3I	3F	3L	3K
102		B	C		E	F	G		I	J		L	3E	3G	3B	3C	3J	3F	3L	3I
103		B	C		E	F	G		I	J	K		3E	3G	3B	3C	3J	3F	3I	3K
104		B	C		E	F	G	H			K	L	3E	3G	3B	3C	3H	3F	3L	3K
105		B	C		E	F	G	H		J		L	3H	3G	3B	3C	3J	3F	3L	3E
106		B	C		E	F	G	H		J	K		3H	3G	3B	3C	3J	3F	3E	3K
107		B	C		E	F	G	H	I			L	3E	3G	3B	3C	3H	3F	3L	3I
108		B	C		E	F	G	H	I		K		3E	3G	3B	3C	3H	3F	3I	3K
109		B	C		E	F	G	H	I	J			3H	3G	3B	3C	3J	3F	3E	3I
110		B	C	D				H	I	J	K	L	3H	3J	3B	3C	3I	3D	3L	3K
111		B	C	D			G		I	J	K	L	3I	3G	3B	3C	3J	3D	3L	3K
112		B	C	D			G	H		J	K	L	3H	3G	3B	3C	3J	3D	3L	3K
113		B	C	D			G	H	I		K	L	3H	3G	3B	3C	3I	3D	3L	3K
114		B	C	D			G	H	I	J		L	3H	3G	3B	3C	3J	3D	3L	3I
115		B	C	D			G	H	I	J	K		3H	3G	3B	3C	3J	3D	3I	3K
116		B	C	D		F			I	J	K	L	3C	3J	3B	3D	3I	3F	3L	3K
117		B	C	D		F		H		J	K	L	3C	3J	3B	3D	3H	3F	3L	3K
118		B	C	D		F		H	I		K	L	3C	3I	3B	3D	3H	3F	3L	3K
119		B	C	D		F		H	I	J		L	3C	3J	3B	3D	3H	3F	3L	3I
120		B	C	D		F		H	I	J	K		3C	3J	3B	3D	3H	3F	3I	3K
121		B	C	D		F	G			J	K	L	3C	3G	3B	3D	3J	3F	3L	3K
122		B	C	D		F	G		I		K	L	3C	3G	3B	3D	3I	3F	3L	3K
123		B	C	D		F	G		I	J		L	3C	3G	3B	3D	3J	3F	3L	3I
124		B	C	D		F	G		I	J	K		3C	3G	3B	3D	3J	3F	3I	3K
125		B	C	D		F	G	H			K	L	3C	3G	3B	3D	3H	3F	3L	3K
126		B	C	D		F	G	H		J		L	3C	3G	3B	3D	3H	3F	3L	3J
127		B	C	D		F	G	H		J	K		3H	3G	3B	3C	3J	3F	3D	3K
128		B	C	D		F	G	H	I			L	3C	3G	3B	3D	3H	3F	3L	3I
129		B	C	D		F	G	H	I		K		3C	3G	3B	3D	3H	3F	3I	3K
130		B	C	D		F	G	H	I	J			3H	3G	3B	3C	3J	3F	3D	3I
131		B	C	D	E				I	J	K	L	3E	3J	3B	3C	3I	3D	3L	3K
132		B	C	D	E			H		J	K	L	3E	3J	3B	3C	3H	3D	3L	3K
133		B	C	D	E			H	I		K	L	3E	3I	3B	3C	3H	3D	3L	3K
134		B	C	D	E			H	I	J		L	3E	3J	3B	3C	3H	3D	3L	3I
135		B	C	D	E			H	I	J	K		3E	3J	3B	3C	3H	3D	3I	3K
136		B	C	D	E		G			J	K	L	3E	3G	3B	3C	3J	3D	3L	3K
137		B	C	D	E		G		I		K	L	3E	3G	3B	3C	3I	3D	3L	3K
138		B	C	D	E		G		I	J		L	3E	3G	3B	3C	3J	3D	3L	3I
139		B	C	D	E		G		I	J	K		3E	3G	3B	3C	3J	3D	3I	3K
140		B	C	D	E		G	H			K	L	3E	3G	3B	3C	3H	3D	3L	3K
141		B	C	D	E		G	H		J		L	3H	3G	3B	3C	3J	3D	3L	3E
142		B	C	D	E		G	H		J	K		3H	3G	3B	3C	3J	3D	3E	3K
143		B	C	D	E		G	H	I			L	3E	3G	3B	3C	3H	3D	3L	3I
144		B	C	D	E		G	H	I		K		3E	3G	3B	3C	3H	3D	3I	3K
145		B	C	D	E		G	H	I	J			3H	3G	3B	3C	3J	3D	3E	3I
146		B	C	D	E	F				J	K	L	3C	3J	3B	3D	3E	3F	3L	3K
147		B	C	D	E	F			I		K	L	3C	3E	3B	3D	3I	3F	3L	3K
148		B	C	D	E	F			I	J		L	3C	3J	3B	3D	3E	3F	3L	3I
149		B	C	D	E	F			I	J	K		3C	3J	3B	3D	3E	3F	3I	3K
150		B	C	D	E	F		H			K	L	3C	3E	3B	3D	3H	3F	3L	3K
151		B	C	D	E	F		H		J		L	3C	3J	3B	3D	3H	3F	3L	3E
152		B	C	D	E	F		H		J	K		3C	3J	3B	3D	3H	3F	3E	3K
153		B	C	D	E	F		H	I			L	3C	3E	3B	3D	3H	3F	3L	3I
154		B	C	D	E	F		H	I		K		3C	3E	3B	3D	3H	3F	3I	3K
155		B	C	D	E	F		H	I	J			3C	3J	3B	3D	3H	3F	3E	3I
156		B	C	D	E	F	G				K	L	3C	3G	3B	3D	3E	3F	3L	3K
157		B	C	D	E	F	G			J		L	3C	3G	3B	3D	3J	3F	3L	3E
158		B	C	D	E	F	G			J	K		3C	3G	3B	3D	3J	3F	3E	3K
159		B	C	D	E	F	G		I			L	3C	3G	3B	3D	3E	3F	3L	3I
160		B	C	D	E	F	G		I		K		3C	3G	3B	3D	3E	3F	3I	3K
161		B	C	D	E	F	G		I	J			3C	3G	3B	3D	3J	3F	3E	3I
162		B	C	D	E	F	G	H				L	3C	3G	3B	3D	3H	3F	3L	3E
163		B	C	D	E	F	G	H			K		3C	3G	3B	3D	3H	3F	3E	3K
164		B	C	D	E	F	G	H		J			3H	3G	3B	3C	3J	3F	3D	3E
165		B	C	D	E	F	G	H	I				3C	3G	3B	3D	3H	3F	3E	3I
166	A					F	G	H	I	J	K	L	3H	3J	3I	3F	3A	3G	3L	3K
167	A				E		G	H	I	J	K	L	3E	3J	3I	3A	3H	3G	3L	3K
168	A				E	F		H	I	J	K	L	3E	3J	3I	3F	3A	3H	3L	3K
169	A				E	F	G		I	J	K	L	3E	3J	3I	3F	3A	3G	3L	3K
170	A				E	F	G	H		J	K	L	3E	3G	3J	3F	3A	3H	3L	3K
171	A				E	F	G	H	I		K	L	3E	3G	3I	3F	3A	3H	3L	3K
172	A				E	F	G	H	I	J		L	3E	3G	3J	3F	3A	3H	3L	3I
173	A				E	F	G	H	I	J	K		3E	3G	3J	3F	3A	3H	3I	3K
174	A			D			G	H	I	J	K	L	3H	3J	3I	3D	3A	3G	3L	3K
175	A			D		F		H	I	J	K	L	3H	3J	3I	3D	3A	3F	3L	3K
176	A			D		F	G		I	J	K	L	3I	3G	3J	3D	3A	3F	3L	3K
177	A			D		F	G	H		J	K	L	3H	3G	3J	3D	3A	3F	3L	3K
178	A			D		F	G	H	I		K	L	3H	3G	3I	3D	3A	3F	3L	3K
179	A			D		F	G	H	I	J		L	3H	3G	3J	3D	3A	3F	3L	3I
180	A			D		F	G	H	I	J	K		3H	3G	3J	3D	3A	3F	3I	3K
181	A			D	E			H	I	J	K	L	3E	3J	3I	3D	3A	3H	3L	3K
182	A			D	E		G		I	J	K	L	3E	3J	3I	3D	3A	3G	3L	3K
183	A			D	E		G	H		J	K	L	3E	3G	3J	3D	3A	3H	3L	3K
184	A			D	E		G	H	I		K	L	3E	3G	3I	3D	3A	3H	3L	3K
185	A			D	E		G	H	I	J		L	3E	3G	3J	3D	3A	3H	3L	3I
186	A			D	E		G	H	I	J	K		3E	3G	3J	3D	3A	3H	3I	3K
187	A			D	E	F			I	J	K	L	3E	3J	3I	3D	3A	3F	3L	3K
188	A			D	E	F		H		J	K	L	3H	3J	3E	3D	3A	3F	3L	3K
189	A			D	E	F		H	I		K	L	3H	3E	3I	3D	3A	3F	3L	3K
190	A			D	E	F		H	I	J		L	3H	3J	3E	3D	3A	3F	3L	3I
191	A			D	E	F		H	I	J	K		3H	3J	3E	3D	3A	3F	3I	3K
192	A			D	E	F	G			J	K	L	3E	3G	3J	3D	3A	3F	3L	3K
193	A			D	E	F	G		I		K	L	3E	3G	3I	3D	3A	3F	3L	3K
194	A			D	E	F	G		I	J		L	3E	3G	3J	3D	3A	3F	3L	3I
195	A			D	E	F	G		I	J	K		3E	3G	3J	3D	3A	3F	3I	3K
196	A			D	E	F	G	H			K	L	3H	3G	3E	3D	3A	3F	3L	3K
197	A			D	E	F	G	H		J		L	3H	3G	3J	3D	3A	3F	3L	3E
198	A			D	E	F	G	H		J	K		3H	3G	3J	3D	3A	3F	3E	3K
199	A			D	E	F	G	H	I			L	3H	3G	3E	3D	3A	3F	3L	3I
200	A			D	E	F	G	H	I		K		3H	3G	3E	3D	3A	3F	3I	3K
201	A			D	E	F	G	H	I	J			3H	3G	3J	3D	3A	3F	3E	3I
202	A		C				G	H	I	J	K	L	3H	3J	3I	3C	3A	3G	3L	3K
203	A		C			F		H	I	J	K	L	3H	3J	3I	3C	3A	3F	3L	3K
204	A		C			F	G		I	J	K	L	3I	3G	3J	3C	3A	3F	3L	3K
205	A		C			F	G	H		J	K	L	3H	3G	3J	3C	3A	3F	3L	3K
206	A		C			F	G	H	I		K	L	3H	3G	3I	3C	3A	3F	3L	3K
207	A		C			F	G	H	I	J		L	3H	3G	3J	3C	3A	3F	3L	3I
208	A		C			F	G	H	I	J	K		3H	3G	3J	3C	3A	3F	3I	3K
209	A		C		E			H	I	J	K	L	3E	3J	3I	3C	3A	3H	3L	3K
210	A		C		E		G		I	J	K	L	3E	3J	3I	3C	3A	3G	3L	3K
211	A		C		E		G	H		J	K	L	3E	3G	3J	3C	3A	3H	3L	3K
212	A		C		E		G	H	I		K	L	3E	3G	3I	3C	3A	3H	3L	3K
213	A		C		E		G	H	I	J		L	3E	3G	3J	3C	3A	3H	3L	3I
214	A		C		E		G	H	I	J	K		3E	3G	3J	3C	3A	3H	3I	3K
215	A		C		E	F			I	J	K	L	3E	3J	3I	3C	3A	3F	3L	3K
216	A		C		E	F		H		J	K	L	3H	3J	3E	3C	3A	3F	3L	3K
217	A		C		E	F		H	I		K	L	3H	3E	3I	3C	3A	3F	3L	3K
218	A		C		E	F		H	I	J		L	3H	3J	3E	3C	3A	3F	3L	3I
219	A		C		E	F		H	I	J	K		3H	3J	3E	3C	3A	3F	3I	3K
220	A		C		E	F	G			J	K	L	3E	3G	3J	3C	3A	3F	3L	3K
221	A		C		E	F	G		I		K	L	3E	3G	3I	3C	3A	3F	3L	3K
222	A		C		E	F	G		I	J		L	3E	3G	3J	3C	3A	3F	3L	3I
223	A		C		E	F	G		I	J	K		3E	3G	3J	3C	3A	3F	3I	3K
224	A		C		E	F	G	H			K	L	3H	3G	3E	3C	3A	3F	3L	3K
225	A		C		E	F	G	H		J		L	3H	3G	3J	3C	3A	3F	3L	3E
226	A		C		E	F	G	H		J	K		3H	3G	3J	3C	3A	3F	3E	3K
227	A		C		E	F	G	H	I			L	3H	3G	3E	3C	3A	3F	3L	3I
228	A		C		E	F	G	H	I		K		3H	3G	3E	3C	3A	3F	3I	3K
229	A		C		E	F	G	H	I	J			3H	3G	3J	3C	3A	3F	3E	3I
230	A		C	D				H	I	J	K	L	3H	3J	3I	3C	3A	3D	3L	3K
231	A		C	D			G		I	J	K	L	3I	3G	3J	3C	3A	3D	3L	3K
232	A		C	D			G	H		J	K	L	3H	3G	3J	3C	3A	3D	3L	3K
233	A		C	D			G	H	I		K	L	3H	3G	3I	3C	3A	3D	3L	3K
234	A		C	D			G	H	I	J		L	3H	3G	3J	3C	3A	3D	3L	3I
235	A		C	D			G	H	I	J	K		3H	3G	3J	3C	3A	3D	3I	3K
236	A		C	D		F			I	J	K	L	3C	3J	3I	3D	3A	3F	3L	3K
237	A		C	D		F		H		J	K	L	3H	3J	3F	3C	3A	3D	3L	3K
238	A		C	D		F		H	I		K	L	3H	3F	3I	3C	3A	3D	3L	3K
239	A		C	D		F		H	I	J		L	3H	3J	3F	3C	3A	3D	3L	3I
240	A		C	D		F		H	I	J	K		3H	3J	3F	3C	3A	3D	3I	3K
241	A		C	D		F	G			J	K	L	3C	3G	3J	3D	3A	3F	3L	3K
242	A		C	D		F	G		I		K	L	3C	3G	3I	3D	3A	3F	3L	3K
243	A		C	D		F	G		I	J		L	3C	3G	3J	3D	3A	3F	3L	3I
244	A		C	D		F	G		I	J	K		3C	3G	3J	3D	3A	3F	3I	3K
245	A		C	D		F	G	H			K	L	3H	3G	3F	3C	3A	3D	3L	3K
246	A		C	D		F	G	H		J		L	3C	3G	3J	3D	3A	3F	3L	3H
247	A		C	D		F	G	H		J	K		3H	3G	3J	3C	3A	3F	3D	3K
248	A		C	D		F	G	H	I			L	3H	3G	3F	3C	3A	3D	3L	3I
249	A		C	D		F	G	H	I		K		3H	3G	3F	3C	3A	3D	3I	3K
250	A		C	D		F	G	H	I	J			3H	3G	3J	3C	3A	3F	3D	3I
251	A		C	D	E				I	J	K	L	3E	3J	3I	3C	3A	3D	3L	3K
252	A		C	D	E			H		J	K	L	3H	3J	3E	3C	3A	3D	3L	3K
253	A		C	D	E			H	I		K	L	3H	3E	3I	3C	3A	3D	3L	3K
254	A		C	D	E			H	I	J		L	3H	3J	3E	3C	3A	3D	3L	3I
255	A		C	D	E			H	I	J	K		3H	3J	3E	3C	3A	3D	3I	3K
256	A		C	D	E		G			J	K	L	3E	3G	3J	3C	3A	3D	3L	3K
257	A		C	D	E		G		I		K	L	3E	3G	3I	3C	3A	3D	3L	3K
258	A		C	D	E		G		I	J		L	3E	3G	3J	3C	3A	3D	3L	3I
259	A		C	D	E		G		I	J	K		3E	3G	3J	3C	3A	3D	3I	3K
260	A		C	D	E		G	H			K	L	3H	3G	3E	3C	3A	3D	3L	3K
261	A		C	D	E		G	H		J		L	3H	3G	3J	3C	3A	3D	3L	3E
262	A		C	D	E		G	H		J	K		3H	3G	3J	3C	3A	3D	3E	3K
263	A		C	D	E		G	H	I			L	3H	3G	3E	3C	3A	3D	3L	3I
264	A		C	D	E		G	H	I		K		3H	3G	3E	3C	3A	3D	3I	3K
265	A		C	D	E		G	H	I	J			3H	3G	3J	3C	3A	3D	3E	3I
266	A		C	D	E	F				J	K	L	3C	3J	3E	3D	3A	3F	3L	3K
267	A		C	D	E	F			I		K	L	3C	3E	3I	3D	3A	3F	3L	3K
268	A		C	D	E	F			I	J		L	3C	3J	3E	3D	3A	3F	3L	3I
269	A		C	D	E	F			I	J	K		3C	3J	3E	3D	3A	3F	3I	3K
270	A		C	D	E	F		H			K	L	3H	3E	3F	3C	3A	3D	3L	3K
271	A		C	D	E	F		H		J		L	3H	3J	3F	3C	3A	3D	3L	3E
272	A		C	D	E	F		H		J	K		3H	3J	3E	3C	3A	3F	3D	3K
273	A		C	D	E	F		H	I			L	3H	3E	3F	3C	3A	3D	3L	3I
274	A		C	D	E	F		H	I		K		3H	3E	3F	3C	3A	3D	3I	3K
275	A		C	D	E	F		H	I	J			3H	3J	3E	3C	3A	3F	3D	3I
276	A		C	D	E	F	G				K	L	3C	3G	3E	3D	3A	3F	3L	3K
277	A		C	D	E	F	G			J		L	3C	3G	3J	3D	3A	3F	3L	3E
278	A		C	D	E	F	G			J	K		3C	3G	3J	3D	3A	3F	3E	3K
279	A		C	D	E	F	G		I			L	3C	3G	3E	3D	3A	3F	3L	3I
280	A		C	D	E	F	G		I		K		3C	3G	3E	3D	3A	3F	3I	3K
281	A		C	D	E	F	G		I	J			3C	3G	3J	3D	3A	3F	3E	3I
282	A		C	D	E	F	G	H				L	3H	3G	3F	3C	3A	3D	3L	3E
283	A		C	D	E	F	G	H			K		3H	3G	3E	3C	3A	3F	3D	3K
284	A		C	D	E	F	G	H		J			3H	3G	3J	3C	3A	3F	3D	3E
285	A		C	D	E	F	G	H	I				3H	3G	3E	3C	3A	3F	3D	3I
286	A	B					G	H	I	J	K	L	3H	3J	3B	3A	3I	3G	3L	3K
287	A	B				F		H	I	J	K	L	3H	3J	3B	3A	3I	3F	3L	3K
288	A	B				F	G		I	J	K	L	3I	3J	3B	3F	3A	3G	3L	3K
289	A	B				F	G	H		J	K	L	3H	3J	3B	3F	3A	3G	3L	3K
290	A	B				F	G	H	I		K	L	3H	3G	3B	3A	3I	3F	3L	3K
291	A	B				F	G	H	I	J		L	3H	3J	3B	3F	3A	3G	3L	3I
292	A	B				F	G	H	I	J	K		3H	3J	3B	3F	3A	3G	3I	3K
293	A	B			E			H	I	J	K	L	3E	3J	3B	3A	3I	3H	3L	3K
294	A	B			E		G		I	J	K	L	3E	3J	3B	3A	3I	3G	3L	3K
295	A	B			E		G	H		J	K	L	3E	3J	3B	3A	3H	3G	3L	3K
296	A	B			E		G	H	I		K	L	3E	3G	3B	3A	3I	3H	3L	3K
297	A	B			E		G	H	I	J		L	3E	3J	3B	3A	3H	3G	3L	3I
298	A	B			E		G	H	I	J	K		3E	3J	3B	3A	3H	3G	3I	3K
299	A	B			E	F			I	J	K	L	3E	3J	3B	3A	3I	3F	3L	3K
300	A	B			E	F		H		J	K	L	3E	3J	3B	3F	3A	3H	3L	3K
301	A	B			E	F		H	I		K	L	3E	3I	3B	3F	3A	3H	3L	3K
302	A	B			E	F		H	I	J		L	3E	3J	3B	3F	3A	3H	3L	3I
303	A	B			E	F		H	I	J	K		3E	3J	3B	3F	3A	3H	3I	3K
304	A	B			E	F	G			J	K	L	3E	3J	3B	3F	3A	3G	3L	3K
305	A	B			E	F	G		I		K	L	3E	3G	3B	3A	3I	3F	3L	3K
306	A	B			E	F	G		I	J		L	3E	3J	3B	3F	3A	3G	3L	3I
307	A	B			E	F	G		I	J	K		3E	3J	3B	3F	3A	3G	3I	3K
308	A	B			E	F	G	H			K	L	3E	3G	3B	3F	3A	3H	3L	3K
309	A	B			E	F	G	H		J		L	3H	3J	3B	3F	3A	3G	3L	3E
310	A	B			E	F	G	H		J	K		3H	3J	3B	3F	3A	3G	3E	3K
311	A	B			E	F	G	H	I			L	3E	3G	3B	3F	3A	3H	3L	3I
312	A	B			E	F	G	H	I		K		3E	3G	3B	3F	3A	3H	3I	3K
313	A	B			E	F	G	H	I	J			3H	3J	3B	3F	3A	3G	3E	3I
314	A	B		D				H	I	J	K	L	3I	3J	3B	3D	3A	3H	3L	3K
315	A	B		D			G		I	J	K	L	3I	3J	3B	3D	3A	3G	3L	3K
316	A	B		D			G	H		J	K	L	3H	3J	3B	3D	3A	3G	3L	3K
317	A	B		D			G	H	I		K	L	3I	3G	3B	3D	3A	3H	3L	3K
318	A	B		D			G	H	I	J		L	3H	3J	3B	3D	3A	3G	3L	3I
319	A	B		D			G	H	I	J	K		3H	3J	3B	3D	3A	3G	3I	3K
320	A	B		D		F			I	J	K	L	3I	3J	3B	3D	3A	3F	3L	3K
321	A	B		D		F		H		J	K	L	3H	3J	3B	3D	3A	3F	3L	3K
322	A	B		D		F		H	I		K	L	3H	3I	3B	3D	3A	3F	3L	3K
323	A	B		D		F		H	I	J		L	3H	3J	3B	3D	3A	3F	3L	3I
324	A	B		D		F		H	I	J	K		3H	3J	3B	3D	3A	3F	3I	3K
325	A	B		D		F	G			J	K	L	3F	3J	3B	3D	3A	3G	3L	3K
326	A	B		D		F	G		I		K	L	3I	3G	3B	3D	3A	3F	3L	3K
327	A	B		D		F	G		I	J		L	3F	3J	3B	3D	3A	3G	3L	3I
328	A	B		D		F	G		I	J	K		3F	3J	3B	3D	3A	3G	3I	3K
329	A	B		D		F	G	H			K	L	3H	3G	3B	3D	3A	3F	3L	3K
330	A	B		D		F	G	H		J		L	3H	3G	3B	3D	3A	3F	3L	3J
331	A	B		D		F	G	H		J	K		3H	3G	3B	3D	3A	3F	3J	3K
332	A	B		D		F	G	H	I			L	3H	3G	3B	3D	3A	3F	3L	3I
333	A	B		D		F	G	H	I		K		3H	3G	3B	3D	3A	3F	3I	3K
334	A	B		D		F	G	H	I	J			3H	3G	3B	3D	3A	3F	3I	3J
335	A	B		D	E				I	J	K	L	3E	3J	3B	3A	3I	3D	3L	3K
336	A	B		D	E			H		J	K	L	3E	3J	3B	3D	3A	3H	3L	3K
337	A	B		D	E			H	I		K	L	3E	3I	3B	3D	3A	3H	3L	3K
338	A	B		D	E			H	I	J		L	3E	3J	3B	3D	3A	3H	3L	3I
339	A	B		D	E			H	I	J	K		3E	3J	3B	3D	3A	3H	3I	3K
340	A	B		D	E		G			J	K	L	3E	3J	3B	3D	3A	3G	3L	3K
341	A	B		D	E		G		I		K	L	3E	3G	3B	3A	3I	3D	3L	3K
342	A	B		D	E		G		I	J		L	3E	3J	3B	3D	3A	3G	3L	3I
343	A	B		D	E		G		I	J	K		3E	3J	3B	3D	3A	3G	3I	3K
344	A	B		D	E		G	H			K	L	3E	3G	3B	3D	3A	3H	3L	3K
345	A	B		D	E		G	H		J		L	3H	3J	3B	3D	3A	3G	3L	3E
346	A	B		D	E		G	H		J	K		3H	3J	3B	3D	3A	3G	3E	3K
347	A	B		D	E		G	H	I			L	3E	3G	3B	3D	3A	3H	3L	3I
348	A	B		D	E		G	H	I		K		3E	3G	3B	3D	3A	3H	3I	3K
349	A	B		D	E		G	H	I	J			3H	3J	3B	3D	3A	3G	3E	3I
350	A	B		D	E	F				J	K	L	3E	3J	3B	3D	3A	3F	3L	3K
351	A	B		D	E	F			I		K	L	3E	3I	3B	3D	3A	3F	3L	3K
352	A	B		D	E	F			I	J		L	3E	3J	3B	3D	3A	3F	3L	3I
353	A	B		D	E	F			I	J	K		3E	3J	3B	3D	3A	3F	3I	3K
354	A	B		D	E	F		H			K	L	3H	3E	3B	3D	3A	3F	3L	3K
355	A	B		D	E	F		H		J		L	3H	3J	3B	3D	3A	3F	3L	3E
356	A	B		D	E	F		H		J	K		3H	3J	3B	3D	3A	3F	3E	3K
357	A	B		D	E	F		H	I			L	3H	3E	3B	3D	3A	3F	3L	3I
358	A	B		D	E	F		H	I		K		3H	3E	3B	3D	3A	3F	3I	3K
359	A	B		D	E	F		H	I	J			3H	3J	3B	3D	3A	3F	3E	3I
360	A	B		D	E	F	G				K	L	3E	3G	3B	3D	3A	3F	3L	3K
361	A	B		D	E	F	G			J		L	3E	3G	3B	3D	3A	3F	3L	3J
362	A	B		D	E	F	G			J	K		3E	3G	3B	3D	3A	3F	3J	3K
363	A	B		D	E	F	G		I			L	3E	3G	3B	3D	3A	3F	3L	3I
364	A	B		D	E	F	G		I		K		3E	3G	3B	3D	3A	3F	3I	3K
365	A	B		D	E	F	G		I	J			3E	3G	3B	3D	3A	3F	3I	3J
366	A	B		D	E	F	G	H				L	3H	3G	3B	3D	3A	3F	3L	3E
367	A	B		D	E	F	G	H			K		3H	3G	3B	3D	3A	3F	3E	3K
368	A	B		D	E	F	G	H		J			3H	3G	3B	3D	3A	3F	3E	3J
369	A	B		D	E	F	G	H	I				3H	3G	3B	3D	3A	3F	3E	3I
370	A	B	C					H	I	J	K	L	3I	3J	3B	3C	3A	3H	3L	3K
371	A	B	C				G		I	J	K	L	3I	3J	3B	3C	3A	3G	3L	3K
372	A	B	C				G	H		J	K	L	3H	3J	3B	3C	3A	3G	3L	3K
373	A	B	C				G	H	I		K	L	3I	3G	3B	3C	3A	3H	3L	3K
374	A	B	C				G	H	I	J		L	3H	3J	3B	3C	3A	3G	3L	3I
375	A	B	C				G	H	I	J	K		3H	3J	3B	3C	3A	3G	3I	3K
376	A	B	C			F			I	J	K	L	3I	3J	3B	3C	3A	3F	3L	3K
377	A	B	C			F		H		J	K	L	3H	3J	3B	3C	3A	3F	3L	3K
378	A	B	C			F		H	I		K	L	3H	3I	3B	3C	3A	3F	3L	3K
379	A	B	C			F		H	I	J		L	3H	3J	3B	3C	3A	3F	3L	3I
380	A	B	C			F		H	I	J	K		3H	3J	3B	3C	3A	3F	3I	3K
381	A	B	C			F	G			J	K	L	3C	3J	3B	3F	3A	3G	3L	3K
382	A	B	C			F	G		I		K	L	3I	3G	3B	3C	3A	3F	3L	3K
383	A	B	C			F	G		I	J		L	3C	3J	3B	3F	3A	3G	3L	3I
384	A	B	C			F	G		I	J	K		3C	3J	3B	3F	3A	3G	3I	3K
385	A	B	C			F	G	H			K	L	3H	3G	3B	3C	3A	3F	3L	3K
386	A	B	C			F	G	H		J		L	3H	3G	3B	3C	3A	3F	3L	3J
387	A	B	C			F	G	H		J	K		3H	3G	3B	3C	3A	3F	3J	3K
388	A	B	C			F	G	H	I			L	3H	3G	3B	3C	3A	3F	3L	3I
389	A	B	C			F	G	H	I		K		3H	3G	3B	3C	3A	3F	3I	3K
390	A	B	C			F	G	H	I	J			3H	3G	3B	3C	3A	3F	3I	3J
391	A	B	C		E				I	J	K	L	3E	3J	3B	3A	3I	3C	3L	3K
392	A	B	C		E			H		J	K	L	3E	3J	3B	3C	3A	3H	3L	3K
393	A	B	C		E			H	I		K	L	3E	3I	3B	3C	3A	3H	3L	3K
394	A	B	C		E			H	I	J		L	3E	3J	3B	3C	3A	3H	3L	3I
395	A	B	C		E			H	I	J	K		3E	3J	3B	3C	3A	3H	3I	3K
396	A	B	C		E		G			J	K	L	3E	3J	3B	3C	3A	3G	3L	3K
397	A	B	C		E		G		I		K	L	3E	3G	3B	3A	3I	3C	3L	3K
398	A	B	C		E		G		I	J		L	3E	3J	3B	3C	3A	3G	3L	3I
399	A	B	C		E		G		I	J	K		3E	3J	3B	3C	3A	3G	3I	3K
400	A	B	C		E		G	H			K	L	3E	3G	3B	3C	3A	3H	3L	3K
401	A	B	C		E		G	H		J		L	3H	3J	3B	3C	3A	3G	3L	3E
402	A	B	C		E		G	H		J	K		3H	3J	3B	3C	3A	3G	3E	3K
403	A	B	C		E		G	H	I			L	3E	3G	3B	3C	3A	3H	3L	3I
404	A	B	C		E		G	H	I		K		3E	3G	3B	3C	3A	3H	3I	3K
405	A	B	C		E		G	H	I	J			3H	3J	3B	3C	3A	3G	3E	3I
406	A	B	C		E	F				J	K	L	3E	3J	3B	3C	3A	3F	3L	3K
407	A	B	C		E	F			I		K	L	3E	3I	3B	3C	3A	3F	3L	3K
408	A	B	C		E	F			I	J		L	3E	3J	3B	3C	3A	3F	3L	3I
409	A	B	C		E	F			I	J	K		3E	3J	3B	3C	3A	3F	3I	3K
410	A	B	C		E	F		H			K	L	3H	3E	3B	3C	3A	3F	3L	3K
411	A	B	C		E	F		H		J		L	3H	3J	3B	3C	3A	3F	3L	3E
412	A	B	C		E	F		H		J	K		3H	3J	3B	3C	3A	3F	3E	3K
413	A	B	C		E	F		H	I			L	3H	3E	3B	3C	3A	3F	3L	3I
414	A	B	C		E	F		H	I		K		3H	3E	3B	3C	3A	3F	3I	3K
415	A	B	C		E	F		H	I	J			3H	3J	3B	3C	3A	3F	3E	3I
416	A	B	C		E	F	G				K	L	3E	3G	3B	3C	3A	3F	3L	3K
417	A	B	C		E	F	G			J		L	3E	3G	3B	3C	3A	3F	3L	3J
418	A	B	C		E	F	G			J	K		3E	3G	3B	3C	3A	3F	3J	3K
419	A	B	C		E	F	G		I			L	3E	3G	3B	3C	3A	3F	3L	3I
420	A	B	C		E	F	G		I		K		3E	3G	3B	3C	3A	3F	3I	3K
421	A	B	C		E	F	G		I	J			3E	3G	3B	3C	3A	3F	3I	3J
422	A	B	C		E	F	G	H				L	3H	3G	3B	3C	3A	3F	3L	3E
423	A	B	C		E	F	G	H			K		3H	3G	3B	3C	3A	3F	3E	3K
424	A	B	C		E	F	G	H		J			3H	3G	3B	3C	3A	3F	3E	3J
425	A	B	C		E	F	G	H	I				3H	3G	3B	3C	3A	3F	3E	3I
426	A	B	C	D					I	J	K	L	3I	3J	3B	3C	3A	3D	3L	3K
427	A	B	C	D				H		J	K	L	3H	3J	3B	3C	3A	3D	3L	3K
428	A	B	C	D				H	I		K	L	3H	3I	3B	3C	3A	3D	3L	3K
429	A	B	C	D				H	I	J		L	3H	3J	3B	3C	3A	3D	3L	3I
430	A	B	C	D				H	I	J	K		3H	3J	3B	3C	3A	3D	3I	3K
431	A	B	C	D			G			J	K	L	3C	3J	3B	3D	3A	3G	3L	3K
432	A	B	C	D			G		I		K	L	3I	3G	3B	3C	3A	3D	3L	3K
433	A	B	C	D			G		I	J		L	3C	3J	3B	3D	3A	3G	3L	3I
434	A	B	C	D			G		I	J	K		3C	3J	3B	3D	3A	3G	3I	3K
435	A	B	C	D			G	H			K	L	3H	3G	3B	3C	3A	3D	3L	3K
436	A	B	C	D			G	H		J		L	3H	3G	3B	3C	3A	3D	3L	3J
437	A	B	C	D			G	H		J	K		3H	3G	3B	3C	3A	3D	3J	3K
438	A	B	C	D			G	H	I			L	3H	3G	3B	3C	3A	3D	3L	3I
439	A	B	C	D			G	H	I		K		3H	3G	3B	3C	3A	3D	3I	3K
440	A	B	C	D			G	H	I	J			3H	3G	3B	3C	3A	3D	3I	3J
441	A	B	C	D		F				J	K	L	3C	3J	3B	3D	3A	3F	3L	3K
442	A	B	C	D		F			I		K	L	3C	3I	3B	3D	3A	3F	3L	3K
443	A	B	C	D		F			I	J		L	3C	3J	3B	3D	3A	3F	3L	3I
444	A	B	C	D		F			I	J	K		3C	3J	3B	3D	3A	3F	3I	3K
445	A	B	C	D		F		H			K	L	3H	3F	3B	3C	3A	3D	3L	3K
446	A	B	C	D		F		H		J		L	3C	3J	3B	3D	3A	3F	3L	3H
447	A	B	C	D		F		H		J	K		3H	3J	3B	3C	3A	3F	3D	3K
448	A	B	C	D		F		H	I			L	3H	3F	3B	3C	3A	3D	3L	3I
449	A	B	C	D		F		H	I		K		3H	3F	3B	3C	3A	3D	3I	3K
450	A	B	C	D		F		H	I	J			3H	3J	3B	3C	3A	3F	3D	3I
451	A	B	C	D		F	G				K	L	3C	3G	3B	3D	3A	3F	3L	3K
452	A	B	C	D		F	G			J		L	3C	3G	3B	3D	3A	3F	3L	3J
453	A	B	C	D		F	G			J	K		3C	3G	3B	3D	3A	3F	3J	3K
454	A	B	C	D		F	G		I			L	3C	3G	3B	3D	3A	3F	3L	3I
455	A	B	C	D		F	G		I		K		3C	3G	3B	3D	3A	3F	3I	3K
456	A	B	C	D		F	G		I	J			3C	3G	3B	3D	3A	3F	3I	3J
457	A	B	C	D		F	G	H				L	3C	3G	3B	3D	3A	3F	3L	3H
458	A	B	C	D		F	G	H			K		3H	3G	3B	3C	3A	3F	3D	3K
459	A	B	C	D		F	G	H		J			3H	3G	3B	3C	3A	3F	3D	3J
460	A	B	C	D		F	G	H	I				3H	3G	3B	3C	3A	3F	3D	3I
461	A	B	C	D	E					J	K	L	3E	3J	3B	3C	3A	3D	3L	3K
462	A	B	C	D	E				I		K	L	3E	3I	3B	3C	3A	3D	3L	3K
463	A	B	C	D	E				I	J		L	3E	3J	3B	3C	3A	3D	3L	3I
464	A	B	C	D	E				I	J	K		3E	3J	3B	3C	3A	3D	3I	3K
465	A	B	C	D	E			H			K	L	3H	3E	3B	3C	3A	3D	3L	3K
466	A	B	C	D	E			H		J		L	3H	3J	3B	3C	3A	3D	3L	3E
467	A	B	C	D	E			H		J	K		3H	3J	3B	3C	3A	3D	3E	3K
468	A	B	C	D	E			H	I			L	3H	3E	3B	3C	3A	3D	3L	3I
469	A	B	C	D	E			H	I		K		3H	3E	3B	3C	3A	3D	3I	3K
470	A	B	C	D	E			H	I	J			3H	3J	3B	3C	3A	3D	3E	3I
471	A	B	C	D	E		G				K	L	3E	3G	3B	3C	3A	3D	3L	3K
472	A	B	C	D	E		G			J		L	3E	3G	3B	3C	3A	3D	3L	3J
473	A	B	C	D	E		G			J	K		3E	3G	3B	3C	3A	3D	3J	3K
474	A	B	C	D	E		G		I			L	3E	3G	3B	3C	3A	3D	3L	3I
475	A	B	C	D	E		G		I		K		3E	3G	3B	3C	3A	3D	3I	3K
476	A	B	C	D	E		G		I	J			3E	3G	3B	3C	3A	3D	3I	3J
477	A	B	C	D	E		G	H				L	3H	3G	3B	3C	3A	3D	3L	3E
478	A	B	C	D	E		G	H			K		3H	3G	3B	3C	3A	3D	3E	3K
479	A	B	C	D	E		G	H		J			3H	3G	3B	3C	3A	3D	3E	3J
480	A	B	C	D	E		G	H	I				3H	3G	3B	3C	3A	3D	3E	3I
481	A	B	C	D	E	F					K	L	3C	3E	3B	3D	3A	3F	3L	3K
482	A	B	C	D	E	F				J		L	3C	3J	3B	3D	3A	3F	3L	3E
483	A	B	C	D	E	F				J	K		3C	3J	3B	3D	3A	3F	3E	3K
484	A	B	C	D	E	F			I			L	3C	3E	3B	3D	3A	3F	3L	3I
485	A	B	C	D	E	F			I		K		3C	3E	3B	3D	3A	3F	3I	3K
486	A	B	C	D	E	F			I	J			3C	3J	3B	3D	3A	3F	3E	3I
487	A	B	C	D	E	F		H				L	3H	3F	3B	3C	3A	3D	3L	3E
488	A	B	C	D	E	F		H			K		3H	3E	3B	3C	3A	3F	3D	3K
489	A	B	C	D	E	F		H		J			3H	3J	3B	3C	3A	3F	3D	3E
490	A	B	C	D	E	F		H	I				3H	3E	3B	3C	3A	3F	3D	3I
491	A	B	C	D	E	F	G					L	3C	3G	3B	3D	3A	3F	3L	3E
492	A	B	C	D	E	F	G				K		3C	3G	3B	3D	3A	3F	3E	3K
493	A	B	C	D	E	F	G			J			3C	3G	3B	3D	3A	3F	3E	3J
494	A	B	C	D	E	F	G		I				3C	3G	3B	3D	3A	3F	3E	3I
495	A	B	C	D	E	F	G	H					3H	3G	3B	3C	3A	3F	3D	3E

== Qualified teams ==
The top two teams from each of the twelve groups, along with the eight best-ranked third-placed teams, qualified for the knockout stage.

Group	Winners	Runners-up	Third-placed teams (Best eight qualified)
A	Mexico	South Africa	—N/a
B	Switzerland	Canada	Bosnia and Herzegovina
C	Brazil	Morocco	—N/a
D	United States	Australia	Paraguay
E	Germany	Ivory Coast	Ecuador
F	Netherlands	Japan	Sweden
G	Belgium	Egypt	—N/a
H	Spain	Cape Verde	—N/a
I	France	Norway	Senegal
J	Argentina	Austria	Algeria
K	Colombia	Portugal	DR Congo
L	England	Croatia	Ghana

== Bracket ==
The tournament bracket is shown below, with bold denoting the winners of each match.

Round of 32
June 29 – Foxborough
Germany	1 (3)
**Paraguay (p)**	**1 (4)**
June 30 – East Rutherford
**France**	**3**
Sweden	0
June 28 – Inglewood
South Africa	0
**Canada**	**1**
June 29 – Guadalupe
Netherlands	1 (2)
**Morocco (p)**	**1 (3)**
July 2 – Toronto
**Portugal**	**2**
Croatia	1
July 2 – Inglewood
**Spain**	**3**
Austria	0
July 1 – Santa Clara
**United States**	**2**
Bosnia and Herzegovina	0
July 1 – Seattle
**Belgium (a.e.t.)**	**3**
Senegal	2
June 29 – Houston
**Brazil**	**2**
Japan	1
June 30 – Arlington
Ivory Coast	1
**Norway**	**2**
June 30 – Mexico City
**Mexico**	**2**
Ecuador	0
July 1 – Atlanta
**England**	**2**
DR Congo	1
July 3 – Miami Gardens
**Argentina (a.e.t.)**	**3**
Cape Verde	2
July 3 – Arlington
Australia	1 (2)
**Egypt (p)**	**1 (4)**
July 2 – Vancouver
**Switzerland**	**2**
Algeria	0
July 3 – Kansas City
**Colombia**	**1**
Ghana	0

Round of 16
July 4 – Philadelphia
Paraguay	0
**France**	**1**
July 4 – Houston
Canada	0
**Morocco**	**3**
July 6 – Arlington
Portugal	0
**Spain**	**1**
July 6 – Seattle
United States	1
**Belgium**	**4**
July 5 – East Rutherford
Brazil	1
**Norway**	**2**
July 5 – Mexico City
Mexico	2
**England**	**3**
July 7 – Atlanta
**Argentina**	**3**
Egypt	2
July 7 – Vancouver
**Switzerland (p)**	**0 (4)**
Colombia	0 (3)

Quarterfinals
July 9 – Foxborough
**France**	**2**
Morocco	0
July 10 – Inglewood
**Spain**	**2**
Belgium	1
July 11 – Miami Gardens
Norway	1
**England (a.e.t.)**	**2**
July 11 – Kansas City
**Argentina (a.e.t.)**	**3**
Switzerland	1

Semifinals
July 14 – Arlington
France	0
**Spain**	**2**
July 15 – Atlanta
England	1
**Argentina**	**2**

Final
July 19 – East Rutherford
**Spain (a.e.t.)**	**1**
Argentina	0
Match for third place
July 18 – Miami Gardens
France	4
**England**	**6**

== Round of 32 ==
June 28, 2026
12:00 p.m. UTC−7

South Africa	0–1	Canada
	(Note: "South Africa vs Canada | Round of 32 | FIFA World Cup 2026". FIFA. Retrieved June 28, 2026.; "Match Report – Round of 32 – South Africa v. Canada". FIFA. June 28, 2026. Retrieved June 28, 2026.; "Post match summary report – Round of 32 – South Africa v. Canada". FIFA. June 29, 2026. Retrieved June 29, 2026.)	Eustáquio 90+2'

SoFi Stadium, Inglewood
Attendance: 69,237
Referee: João Pinheiro (Portugal)

June 29, 2026
12:00 p.m. UTC−5

Brazil	2–1	Japan
Casemiro 56'; Martinelli 90+5'	(Note: "Brazil vs Japan | Round of 32 | FIFA World Cup 2026". FIFA. Retrieved June 29, 2026.; "Match Report – Round of 32 – Brazil v. Japan". FIFA. June 29, 2026. Retrieved June 29, 2026.; "Post match summary report – Round of 32 – Brazil v. Japan". FIFA. June 30, 2026. Retrieved June 30, 2026.)	Sano 29'

NRG Stadium, Houston
Attendance: 68,777
Referee: Maurizio Mariani (Italy)

June 29, 2026
4:30 p.m. UTC−4

Germany	1–1 (a.e.t.)	Paraguay
Havertz 54'	(Note: "Germany vs Paraguay | Round of 32 | FIFA World Cup 2026". FIFA. Retrieved June 29, 2026.; "Match Report – Round of 32 – Germany v. Paraguay". FIFA. June 29, 2026. Retrieved June 29, 2026.; "Post match summary report – Round of 32 – Germany v. Paraguay". FIFA. June 30, 2026. Retrieved June 30, 2026.)	Enciso 42'
Penalties
Havertz (penalty missed); Kimmich (penalty scored); Musiala (penalty scored); Woltemade (penalty missed); Amiri (penalty scored); Tah (penalty missed)	3–4	(penalty scored) Maurício; (penalty scored) G. Gómez; (penalty scored) Galarza; (penalty missed) Sanabria; (penalty missed) Balbuena; (penalty scored) Canale

Gillette Stadium, Foxborough
Attendance: 63,945
Referee: Jalal Jayed (Morocco)

June 29, 2026
7:00 p.m. UTC−6

Netherlands	1–1 (a.e.t.)	Morocco
Gakpo 72'	(Note: "Netherlands vs Morocco | Round of 32 | FIFA World Cup 2026". FIFA. Retrieved June 30, 2026.; "Match Report – Round of 32 – Netherlands v. Morocco". FIFA. June 30, 2026. Retrieved June 30, 2026.; "Post match summary report – Round of 32 – Netherlands v. Morocco". FIFA. June 30, 2026. Retrieved June 30, 2026.)	Diop 90+1'
Penalties
Koopmeiners (penalty scored); Kluivert (penalty missed); Weghorst (penalty scored); Timber (penalty missed); Summerville (penalty missed)	2–3	(penalty missed) El Aynaoui; (penalty scored) Rahimi; (penalty scored) Talbi; (penalty missed) Hakimi; (penalty scored) Saibari

Estadio BBVA, Guadalupe
Attendance: 51,243
Referee: Wilton Sampaio (Brazil)

June 30, 2026
12:00 p.m. UTC−5

Ivory Coast	1–2	Norway
Diallo 74'	(Note: "Côte d'Ivoire vs Norway | Round of 32 | FIFA World Cup 2026". FIFA. Retrieved June 30, 2026.; "Match Report – Round of 32 – Côte d'Ivoire v. Norway". FIFA. June 30, 2026. Retrieved June 30, 2026.; "Post match summary report – Round of 32 – Côte d'Ivoire vs. Norway". FIFA. July 1, 2026. Retrieved July 1, 2026.)	Nusa 39'; Haaland 86'

AT&T Stadium, Arlington
Attendance: 69,665
Referee: Jesús Valenzuela (Venezuela)

June 30, 2026
5:00 p.m. UTC−4

France	3–0	Sweden
Mbappé 45', 74'; Barcola 53'	(Note: "France vs Sweden | Round of 32 | FIFA World Cup 2026". FIFA. Retrieved June 30, 2026.; "Match Report – Round of 32 – France v. Sweden". FIFA. June 30, 2026. Retrieved June 30, 2026.; "Post match summary report – Round of 32 – France vs. Sweden". FIFA. July 1, 2026. Retrieved July 1, 2026.)

MetLife Stadium, East Rutherford
Attendance: 80,663
Referee: Danny Makkelie (Netherlands)

June 30, 2026
8:00 p.m. UTC−6 (Note: The Mexico v Ecuador match, originally scheduled for 7:00 p.m. UTC−6, was delayed by an hour due to adverse weather conditions.)

Mexico	2–0	Ecuador
Quiñones 22'; Jiménez 31'	(Note: "Mexico vs Ecuador | Round of 32 | FIFA World Cup 2026". FIFA. Retrieved July 1, 2026.; "Match Report – Round of 32 – Mexico v. Ecuador". FIFA. July 1, 2026. Retrieved July 1, 2026.; "Post match summary report – Round of 32 – Mexico v. Ecuador". FIFA. July 1, 2026. Retrieved July 1, 2026.)

Estadio Azteca, Mexico City
Attendance: 80,824
Referee: Slavko Vinčić (Slovenia)

July 1, 2026
12:00 p.m. UTC−4

England	2–1	DR Congo
Kane 75', 86'	(Note: "England vs Congo DR | Round of 32 | FIFA World Cup 2026". FIFA. Retrieved July 1, 2026.; "Match Report – Round of 32 – England v. Congo DR". FIFA. July 1, 2026. Retrieved July 1, 2026.; "Post match summary report – Round of 32 – England v. Congo DR". FIFA. July 1, 2026. Retrieved July 3, 2026.)	Cipenga 7'

Mercedes-Benz Stadium, Atlanta
Attendance: 68,239
Referee: Adham Makhadmeh (Jordan)

July 1, 2026
1:00 p.m. UTC−7

Belgium	3–2 (a.e.t.)	Senegal
Lukaku 86'; Tielemans 89', 120+5' (pen.)	(Note: "Belgium vs Senegal | Round of 32 | FIFA World Cup 2026". FIFA. Retrieved June 28, 2026.; "Match Report – Round of 32 – Belgium v. Senegal". FIFA. July 1, 2026. Retrieved July 1, 2026.; "Post match summary report – Round of 32 – Belgium v. Senegal". FIFA. July 1, 2026. Retrieved July 3, 2026.)	Diarra 25'; I. Sarr 51'

Lumen Field, Seattle
Attendance: 66,925
Referee: Saíd Martínez (Honduras)

July 1, 2026
5:00 p.m. UTC−7

United States	2–0	Bosnia and Herzegovina
Balogun 45'; Tillman 82'	(Note: "USA vs Bosnia and Herzegovina | Round of 32 | FIFA World Cup 2026". FIFA. Retrieved July 2, 2026.; "Match Report – Round of 32 – USA v. Bosnia and Herzegovina". FIFA. July 2, 2026. Retrieved July 2, 2026.; "Post match summary report – Round of 32 – USA v. Bosnia and Herzegovina". FIFA. July 1, 2026. Retrieved July 3, 2026.)

Levi's Stadium, Santa Clara
Attendance: 68,827
Referee: Raphael Claus (Brazil)

July 2, 2026
12:00 p.m. UTC−7

Spain	3–0	Austria
Oyarzabal 36', 89'; Porro 66'	(Note: "Spain vs Austria | Round of 32 | FIFA World Cup 2026". FIFA. Retrieved July 2, 2026.; "Match Report – Round of 32 – Spain v. Austria". FIFA. July 2, 2026. Retrieved July 2, 2026.; "Post match summary report – Round of 32 – Spain v. Austria". FIFA. July 2, 2026. Retrieved July 3, 2026.)

SoFi Stadium, Inglewood
Attendance: 70,492
Referee: Glenn Nyberg (Sweden)

July 2, 2026
7:00 p.m. UTC−4

Portugal	2–1	Croatia
Ronaldo 68' (pen.); Ramos 90+4'	(Note: "Portugal vs Croatia | Round of 32 | FIFA World Cup 2026". FIFA. Retrieved July 3, 2026.; "Match Report – Round of 32 – Portugal v. Croatia". FIFA. July 3, 2026. Retrieved July 3, 2026.; "Post match summary report – Round of 32 – Portugal v. Croatia". FIFA. July 2, 2026. Retrieved July 3, 2026.)	Perišić 53'

BMO Field, Toronto
Attendance: 43,036
Referee: Espen Eskås (Norway)

July 2, 2026
8:00 p.m. UTC−7

Switzerland	2–0	Algeria
Embolo 10'; Ndoye 46'	(Note: "Switzerland vs Algeria | Round of 32 | FIFA World Cup 2026". FIFA. Retrieved July 3, 2026.; "Match Report – Round of 32 – Switzerland v. Algeria". FIFA. July 3, 2026. Retrieved July 3, 2026.; "Post match summary report – Round of 32 – Switzerland v. Algeria". FIFA. July 3, 2026. Retrieved July 3, 2026.)

BC Place, Vancouver
Attendance: 52,497
Referee: Yael Falcón (Argentina)

July 3, 2026
1:00 p.m. UTC−5

Australia	1–1 (a.e.t.)	Egypt
Hany 55' (o.g.)	(Note: "Australia vs Egypt | Round of 32 | FIFA World Cup 2026". FIFA. Retrieved July 3, 2026.; "Match Report – Round of 32 – Australia v. Egypt". FIFA. July 3, 2026. Retrieved July 3, 2026.; "Post match summary report – Round of 32 – Australia v. Egypt". FIFA. July 3, 2026. Retrieved July 4, 2026.)	Ashour 13'
Penalties
Souttar (penalty missed); Irvine (penalty scored); Mabil (penalty scored); Herrington (penalty missed)	2–4	(penalty scored) Saber; (penalty scored) Rabia; (penalty scored) Salah; (penalty scored) Abdelmaguid

AT&T Stadium, Arlington
Attendance: 70,244
Referee: Gustavo Tejera (Uruguay)

July 3, 2026
6:00 p.m. UTC−4

Argentina	3–2 (a.e.t.)	Cape Verde
Messi 29'; Li. Martínez 92'; Diney 111' (o.g.)	(Note: "Argentina vs Cabo Verde | Round of 32 | FIFA World Cup 2026". FIFA. Retrieved July 4, 2026.; "Match Report – Round of 32 – Argentina v. Cabo Verde". FIFA. July 4, 2026. Retrieved July 4, 2026.; "Post match summary report – Round of 32 – Argentina v. Cabo Verde". FIFA. July 3, 2026. Retrieved July 4, 2026.)	D. Duarte 59'; Lopes Cabral 103'

Hard Rock Stadium, Miami Gardens
Attendance: 64,478
Referee: Drew Fischer (Canada)

July 3, 2026
8:30 p.m. UTC−5

Colombia	1–0	Ghana
J. Arias 14'	(Note: "Colombia vs Ghana | Round of 32 | FIFA World Cup 2026". FIFA. July 4, 2026. Retrieved July 4, 2026.; "Match Report – Round of 32 – Colombia v. Ghana". FIFA. July 4, 2026. Retrieved July 4, 2026.; "Post match summary report – Round of 32 – Colombia v. Ghana". FIFA. July 3, 2026. Retrieved July 4, 2026.)

Arrowhead Stadium, Kansas City
Attendance: 69,045
Referee: Clément Turpin (France)

== Round of 16 ==
=== Canada vs Morocco ===
The teams had faced each other four times previously, with Morocco being unbeaten in any of these matches. Their most recent match was in the group stage of the previous World Cup, which Morocco won 2–1.

A special ceremony commemorating the United States Semiquincentennial, marking the 250th anniversary of the United States Declaration of Independence, was held on the stadium grounds 25 minutes before kickoff.

In the 50th minute, Morocco took the lead when Azzedine Ounahi received the ball after a free-kick was cut-back to him from the right by Achraf Hakimi, before he shot from the edge of the penalty area, low into the bottom right corner of the net. Ounahi got a second goal in the 82nd minute with a finish from twelve yards out high to the top right corner of the net after a pass from Brahim Díaz from the right. Soufiane Rahimi made it 3–0 in the 98th minute with a low finish under the goalkeeper to the right corner of the net from the left of the penalty area after another pass from Díaz.

With this result and Egypt's loss to Argentina, Morocco was the only African team to proceed to the quarterfinals while co-host Canada was eliminated, marking its best finish since its group-stage exits in 1986 and 2022.

July 4, 2026
12:00 p.m. UTC−5

Canada	0–3	Morocco
	(Note: "Canada vs Morocco | Round of 16 | FIFA World Cup 2026". FIFA. Retrieved July 4, 2026.; "Match Report – Round of 16 – Canada v. Morocco". FIFA. July 4, 2026. Retrieved July 4, 2026.; "Post match summary report – Round of 16 – Canada v. Morocco". FIFA. July 4, 2026. Retrieved July 6, 2026.)	Ounahi 50', 82'; Rahimi 90+8'

NRG Stadium, Houston
Attendance: 68,777
Referee: Michael Oliver (England)

Canada	Morocco

GK	16	Maxime Crépeau
RB	2	Alistair Johnston
CB	15	Moïse Bombito
CB	4	Luc de Fougerolles	(yellow card) 49'
LB	22	Richie Laryea	(yellow card) 40'	(substituted off) 78'
RM	17	Tajon Buchanan		(substituted off) 87'
CM	23	Niko Sigur		(substituted off) 87'
CM	7	Stephen Eustáquio (c)
LM	20	Ali Ahmed		(substituted off) 78'
CF	10	Jonathan David	(yellow card) 43'
CF	12	Tani Oluwaseyi		(substituted off) 63'
Substitutions:
FW	9	Cyle Larin	(yellow card) 67'	(substituted on) 63'
FW	24	Promise David		(substituted on) 78'
MF	14	Jacob Shaffelburg		(substituted on) 78'
FW	26	Jayden Nelson		(substituted on) 87'
MF	21	Jonathan Osorio		(substituted on) 87'
Manager:
(United States) Jesse Marsch

GK	1	Yassine Bounou
RB	2	Achraf Hakimi (c)	(yellow card) 40'
CB	14	Issa Diop		(substituted off) 87'
CB	25	Redouane Halhal	(yellow card) 20'
LB	3	Noussair Mazraoui
CM	6	Ayyoub Bouaddi		(substituted off) 63'
CM	24	Neil El Aynaoui
RW	10	Brahim Díaz
AM	8	Azzedine Ounahi	(yellow card) 45'	(substituted off) 87'
LW	23	Bilal El Khannouss	(yellow card) 45+6'	(substituted off) 63'
CF	11	Ismael Saibari		(substituted off) 22'
Substitutions:
FW	9	Soufiane Rahimi		(substituted on) 22'
MF	7	Chemsdine Talbi		(substituted on) 63'
MF	4	Sofyan Amrabat		(substituted on) 63'
DF	5	Marwane Saâdane		(substituted on) 87'
MF	15	Samir El Mourabet		(substituted on) 87'
Manager:
Mohamed Ouahbi

Man of the Match:
Azzedine Ounahi (Morocco)

Assistant referees:
Stuart Burt (England)
James Mainwaring (England)
Fourth official:
Danny Makkelie (Netherlands)
Reserve assistant referee:
Hessel Steegstra (Netherlands)
Video assistant referee:
Jarred Gillett (England)
Assistant video assistant referee:
Dennis Higler (Netherlands)
Support video assistant referee:
Tomasz Kwiatkowski (Poland)

=== Paraguay vs France ===
During the match between Paraguay and France.

Paraguay had never defeated France in their five previous encounters, including two matches at the FIFA World Cup: a 7–3 group stage loss in 1958 and a 1–0 round of 16 defeat via golden goal at the 1998 FIFA World Cup (which France hosted and current manager Didier Deschamps also played in). Their latest meeting was a 5–0 friendly in 2017.

The match was played in extreme heat, with temperatures up to 38 °C (100 °F) at kickoff time. In the 70th minute, France was awarded a penalty after a VAR intervention when substitute Désiré Doué was fouled inside the box by Diego Gómez. Kylian Mbappé scored a penalty with a low shot to the right corner, sending Paraguay goalkeeper Orlando Gill the wrong way. Paraguay committed 13 fouls to France's 11 during the game, but escaped without a single yellow card while France received three. Global media were almost unanimous in condemning the Paraguayan team's systematic foul play, as well as Ilgiz Tantashev's poor refereeing.

Alongside the Canada vs Morocco match in Houston, a special ceremony commemorating the 250th anniversary of the United States Declaration of Independence was held on the stadium grounds 25 minutes before kickoff.

After the match, Paraguayan Senator, Celeste Amarilla, racially abused Mbappé on social media and the latter made a statement on X in response. Amarilla made a response which was not well received.

July 4, 2026
5:00 p.m. UTC−4

Paraguay	0–1	France
	(Note: "Paraguay vs France | Round of 16 | FIFA World Cup 2026". FIFA. Retrieved July 4, 2026.; "Match Report – Round of 16 – Paraguay v. France". FIFA. July 4, 2026. Retrieved July 4, 2026.; "Post match summary report – Round of 16 – Paraguay v. France". FIFA. July 4, 2026. Retrieved July 5, 2026.)	Mbappé 70' (pen.)

Lincoln Financial Field, Philadelphia
Attendance: 68,324
Referee: Ilgiz Tantashev (Uzbekistan)

Paraguay	France

GK	12	Orlando Gill
CB	2	Gustavo Velázquez
CB	15	Gustavo Gómez (c)
CB	3	Omar Alderete		(substituted off) 58'
RWB	4	Juan José Cáceres
LWB	6	Júnior Alonso
RM	10	Miguel Almirón		(substituted off) 71'
CM	8	Diego Gómez		(substituted off) 71'
CM	14	Andrés Cubas
LM	23	Matías Galarza
CF	19	Julio Enciso		(substituted off) 61'
Substitutions:
DF	13	José Canale		(substituted on) 58'
MF	24	Gustavo Caballero		(substituted on) 61'
FW	21	Gabriel Ávalos		(substituted on) 71'
MF	11	Maurício		(substituted on) 71'
Other disciplinary actions:
TS	—	Carlos González	(yellow card) FT
Manager:
(Argentina) Gustavo Alfaro

GK	16	Mike Maignan
RB	5	Jules Koundé
CB	4	Dayot Upamecano
CB	17	William Saliba
LB	3	Lucas Digne
CM	6	Manu Koné	(yellow card) 81'
CM	14	Adrien Rabiot
RW	7	Ousmane Dembélé		(substituted off) 84'
AM	11	Michael Olise	(yellow card) 90+7'
LW	12	Bradley Barcola	(yellow card) 19'	(substituted off) 61'
CF	10	Kylian Mbappé (c)
Substitutions:
FW	20	Désiré Doué		(substituted on) 61'
MF	24	Rayan Cherki		(substituted on) 84'
Manager:
Didier Deschamps

Man of the Match:
Orlando Gill (Paraguay)

Assistant referees:
Andrey Tsapenko (Uzbekistan)
Timur Gaynullin (Uzbekistan)
Fourth official:
Abdulrahman Al-Jassim (Qatar)
Reserve assistant referee:
Taleb Al-Marri (Qatar)
Video assistant referee:
Juan Lara (Chile)
Assistant video assistant referee:
Marco Di Bello (Italy)
Support video assistant referee:
Joe Dickerson (United States)

=== Brazil vs Norway ===
The teams had met four times previously, including once in the World Cup, a 2–1 group stage victory for Norway in 1998, and most recently in 2006, a 1–1 draw in a friendly to keep Norway's unbeaten head-to-head record. Norway is the only team that Brazil has played but never defeated.

In the 15th minute, Brazil was awarded a penalty when Kristoffer Ajer fouled Matheus Cunha with a sliding tackle. Bruno Guimarães's penalty to the right was saved by Ørjan Nyland after a stuttering run-up.

In the 79th minute, Erling Haaland gave Norway the lead when he headed into the right corner of the net from six yards out after a cross by Andreas Schjelderup from the left. In the 90th minute, Haaland scored again with a left foot shot from just outside the penalty area low to the right corner of the net. Brazil was awarded a penalty in the 10th minute of added time when Leo Ostigard elbowed Casemiro. Neymar scored low to the right of the net. Norway held on to win 2–1 and advanced to the quarterfinals for the first time.

Brazil's loss marked the first time the team was eliminated in the round of 16 since the 1990 edition, when it lost to Argentina 1–0. This was Neymar's last match for Brazil; following the defeat, he announced his international retirement.

July 5, 2026
4:00 p.m. UTC−4

Brazil	1–2	Norway
Neymar 90+10' (pen.)	(Note: "Brazil vs Norway | Round of 16 | FIFA World Cup 2026". FIFA. Retrieved July 5, 2026.; "Match Report – Round of 16 – Brazil v. Norway". FIFA. July 5, 2026. Retrieved July 5, 2026.; "Post match summary report – Round of 16 – Brazil v. Norway". FIFA. July 5, 2026. Retrieved July 6, 2026.)	Haaland 79', 90'

MetLife Stadium, East Rutherford
Attendance: 80,663
Referee: Ismail Elfath (United States)

Brazil	Norway

GK	1	Alisson
RB	13	Danilo Luiz
CB	4	Marquinhos (c)
CB	3	Gabriel Magalhães
LB	16	Douglas Santos
DM	5	Casemiro
CM	8	Bruno Guimarães		(substituted off) 79'
CM	22	Gabriel Martinelli		(substituted off) 67'
RF	26	Rayan		(substituted off) 67'
CF	9	Matheus Cunha		(substituted off) 58'
LF	7	Vinícius Júnior
Substitutions:
FW	19	Endrick		(substituted on) 58'
MF	18	Danilo Santos		(substituted on) 67'
FW	10	Neymar	(yellow card) 90+6'	(substituted on) 67'
MF	2	Éderson Silva		(substituted on) 79'
Manager:
(Italy) Carlo Ancelotti

GK	1	Ørjan Nyland
RB	26	Julian Ryerson	(substituted off) 63'
CB	3	Kristoffer Ajer
CB	17	Torbjørn Heggem
LB	5	David Møller Wolfe	(substituted off) 90+5'
DM	8	Sander Berge
CM	10	Martin Ødegaard (c)
CM	6	Patrick Berg
RF	7	Alexander Sørloth	(substituted off) 46'
CF	9	Erling Haaland
LF	20	Antonio Nusa	(substituted off) 46'
Substitutions:
FW	22	Oscar Bobb	(substituted on) 46'
FW	21	Andreas Schjelderup	(substituted on) 46'
MF	14	Fredrik Aursnes	(substituted on) 63'
DF	4	Leo Østigård	(substituted on) 90+5'
Manager:
Ståle Solbakken

Man of the Match:
Erling Haaland (Norway)

Assistant referees:
Corey Parker (United States)
Kyle Atkins (United States)
Fourth official:
Saíd Martínez (Honduras)
Reserve assistant referee:
Walter López (Honduras)
Video assistant referee:
Tatiana Guzmán (Nicaragua)
Assistant video assistant referee:
Leodán González (Uruguay)
Support video assistant referee:
Carlos del Cerro Grande (Spain)

=== Mexico vs England ===
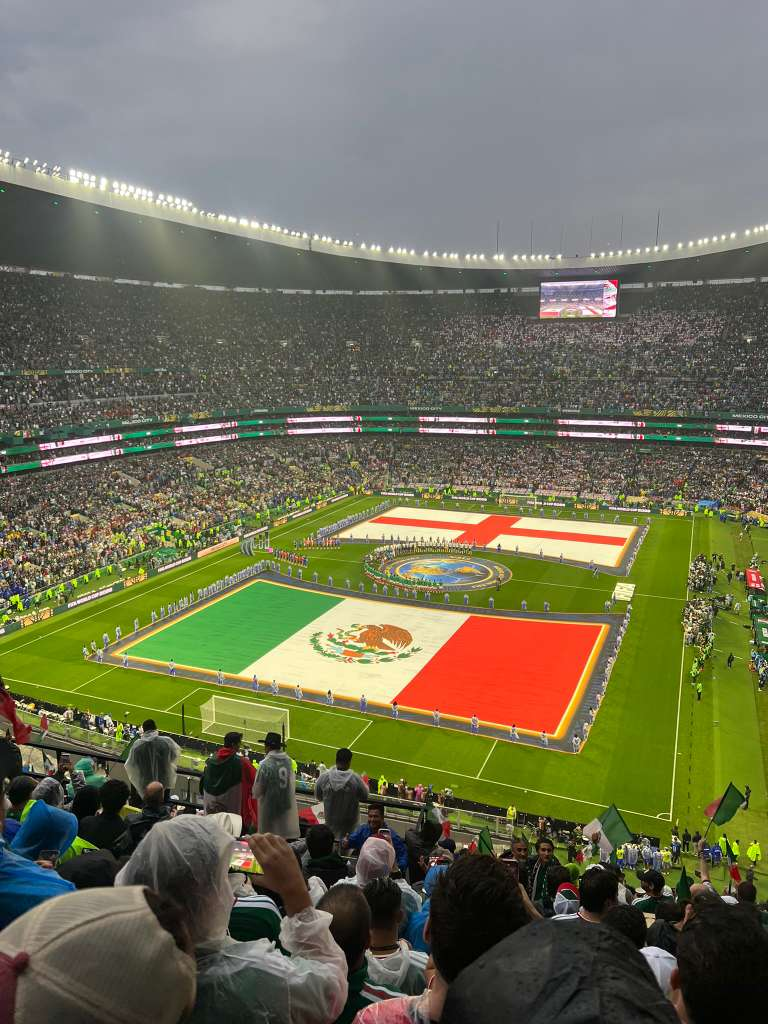
Pre-match ceremony between Mexico and England

The teams had previously faced each other nine times, most recently in 2010, a 3–1 win for England in a friendly match. They also met at the 1966 FIFA World Cup, when England, as the host, won 2–0 in the group stage. Additionally, they encountered each other at Estadio Azteca in a friendly that ended with a 1–0 victory for Mexico in 1985. This was also the first time that England had played at Estadio Azteca since its infamous match against Argentina in the 1986 World Cup, in which England famously conceded Maradona's "hand of God" goal and the "Goal of the Century".

Before the match, it was reported that the game would be moved up to noon due to reports of inclement weather and lightning. However, after protests from both Mexico and England, FIFA reversed the decision and kept the kickoff at the original time. An hour before the kickoff, FIFA delayed the match by one hour due to the aforementioned inclement weather.

In the 36th minute, Jude Bellingham scored to put England into the lead with a diving header to the left of the net from just inside the six yard box after a cross from Bukayo Saka from the right. 98 seconds later it was 2–0 when Bellingham scored again with a low side-foot finish from just inside the six yard after a low cross from Harry Kane from the right. In the 42nd minute, Julián Quiñones pulled a goal back when he shot high to the net from eight yards out after the ball broke to him after a free kick from the left.

In the 54th minute, Jarell Quansah was sent off when he dived in with a high challenge on Jesús Gallardo. England was awarded a penalty in the 60th minute when Anthony Gordon was brought down by the diving Mexican goalkeeper Raúl Rangel. Kane scored the penalty with a shot to the left of the net to restore England's two-goal lead. In the 69th minute, Mexico was awarded a penalty when Kane kicked the foot of Brian Gutiérrez in the penalty area. Raúl Jiménez scored with a shot to the left corner, but Mexico was unable to find an equalizer, with 11 minutes added on at the end.

This match marked the first time Mexico lost a World Cup game at the Azteca, and only the third time it lost a competitive game at the Azteca in its entire history. The defeat also made Mexico the second co-host to be eliminated after Canada, and marked the first time Mexico hosted the tournament without reaching the quarterfinals, failing to match its runs in the 1970 and 1986 editions of the tournament.

This was the final match played in Mexico for the remainder of the tournament.

July 5, 2026
7:00 p.m. UTC−6 (Note: The Mexico v England match, originally scheduled for 6:00 p.m. UTC−6, was delayed by an hour due to adverse weather conditions.)

Mexico	2–3	England
Quiñones 42'; Jiménez 69' (pen.)	(Note: "Mexico vs England | Round of 16 | FIFA World Cup 2026". FIFA. Retrieved July 6, 2026.; "Match Report – Round of 16 – Mexico v. England". FIFA. July 6, 2026. Retrieved July 6, 2026.; "Post match summary report – Round of 16 – Mexico v. England". FIFA. July 6, 2026. Retrieved July 6, 2026.)	Bellingham 36', 38'; Kane 60' (pen.)

Estadio Azteca, Mexico City
Attendance: 80,824
Referee: Alireza Faghani (Australia)

Mexico	England

GK	1	Raúl Rangel
RB	2	Jorge Sánchez	(yellow card) 71'	(substituted off) 79'
CB	3	César Montes (c)		(substituted off) 46'
CB	5	Johan Vásquez	(yellow card) 90+8'
LB	23	Jesús Gallardo
DM	6	Érik Lira
CM	19	Gilberto Mora		(substituted off) 61'
CM	7	Luis Romo		(substituted off) 61'
RF	25	Roberto Alvarado
CF	9	Raúl Jiménez
LF	16	Julián Quiñones		(substituted off) 81'
Substitutions:
DF	4	Edson Álvarez		(substituted on) 46'
MF	26	Brian Gutiérrez		(substituted on) 61'
FW	11	Santiago Giménez		(substituted on) 61'
MF	8	Álvaro Fidalgo		(substituted on) 79'
FW	22	Guillermo Martínez		(substituted on) 81'
Manager:
Javier Aguirre

GK	1	Jordan Pickford
RB	26	Jarell Quansah	(red card) 54'
CB	2	Ezri Konsa
CB	6	Marc Guéhi	(yellow card) 68'
LB	3	Nico O'Reilly	(yellow card) 72'	(substituted off) 75'
CM	8	Elliot Anderson		(substituted off) 75'
CM	4	Declan Rice	(yellow card) 1'
RW	7	Bukayo Saka		(substituted off) 57'
AM	10	Jude Bellingham
LW	18	Anthony Gordon
CF	9	Harry Kane (c)		(substituted off) 90'
Substitutions:
DF	5	John Stones		(substituted on) 57'
DF	15	Dan Burn		(substituted on) 75'
DF	25	Djed Spence		(substituted on) 75'
MF	17	Morgan Rogers		(substituted on) 90'
Other disciplinary actions:
MF	14	Jordan Henderson	(yellow card) 90+8'
Manager:
(Germany) Thomas Tuchel

Man of the Match:
Jude Bellingham (England)

Assistant referees:
George Lakrindis (Australia)
James Lindsay (Australia)
Fourth official:
Jalal Jayed (Morocco)
Reserve assistant referee:
Zakaria Brinsi (Morocco)
Video assistant referee:
Nicolás Gallo (Colombia)
Assistant video assistant referee:
Juan Lara (Chile)
Support video assistant referee:
Juan Soto (Venezuela)

=== Portugal vs Spain ===
The teams had faced each other in 41 previous matches including at the FIFA World Cup on two previous occasions: their first meeting was a 1–0 round of 16 win for Spain at the 2010 FIFA World Cup and then a 3–3 group stage draw at the 2018 FIFA World Cup. Their latest match was the 2025 UEFA Nations League final in which Portugal won 5–3 on penalties following a 2–2 draw.

In the third minute, Mikel Oyarzabal dragged a shot from the left wide of the right post. In the 41st minute Nuno Mendes hit the crossbar for Portugal after his shot deflected off Pedro Porro. In the 91st minute substitute Mikel Merino received a pass from fellow ‌substitute Ferran Torres on the left of the penalty area before shooting low left-footed to the left corner of the net for the only goal of the match. Portugal's defeat ended Cristiano Ronaldo's World Cup career after he had confirmed earlier that this tournament would be his last.

Following the result, Portugal coach Roberto Martínez announced his resignation with immediate effect. Meanwhile, Portugal striker Cristiano Ronaldo confirmed that this was his last World Cup match ahead of his expected retirement.

July 6, 2026
2:00 p.m. UTC−5

Portugal	0–1	Spain
	(Note: "Portugal vs Spain | Round of 16 | FIFA World Cup 2026". FIFA. Retrieved July 6, 2026.; "Match Report – Round of 16 – Portugal v. Spain". FIFA. July 6, 2026. Retrieved July 6, 2026.; "Post match summary report – Round of 16 – Portugal v. Spain". FIFA. July 6, 2026. Retrieved July 7, 2026.)	Merino 90+1'

AT&T Stadium, Arlington
Attendance: 70,649
Referee: Anthony Taylor (England)

Portugal	Spain

GK	1	Diogo Costa
RB	20	João Cancelo		(substituted off) 71'
CB	3	Rúben Dias
CB	13	Renato Veiga	(yellow card) 90+3'
LB	25	Nuno Mendes		(substituted off) 56'
CM	15	João Neves
CM	23	Vitinha		(substituted off) 83'
RW	18	Pedro Neto		(substituted off) 83'
AM	8	Bruno Fernandes
LW	11	João Félix		(substituted off) 71'
CF	7	Cristiano Ronaldo (c)
Substitutions:
DF	2	Nélson Semedo		(substituted on) 56'
FW	17	Rafael Leão		(substituted on) 71'
DF	5	Diogo Dalot		(substituted on) 71'
FW	26	Francisco Conceição		(substituted on) 83'
MF	10	Bernardo Silva	(yellow card) 89'	(substituted on) 83'
Manager:
(Spain) Roberto Martínez

GK	23	Unai Simón
RB	12	Pedro Porro
CB	22	Pau Cubarsí
CB	14	Aymeric Laporte
LB	24	Marc Cucurella
DM	16	Rodri (c)
CM	10	Dani Olmo		(substituted off) 85'
CM	20	Pedri		(substituted off) 85'
RF	19	Lamine Yamal
CF	21	Mikel Oyarzabal		(substituted off) 90+7'
LF	15	Álex Baena		(substituted off) 75'
Substitutions:
FW	7	Ferran Torres	(yellow card) 90+8'	(substituted on) 75'
MF	6	Mikel Merino		(substituted on) 85'
MF	8	Fabián Ruiz		(substituted on) 85'
FW	26	Borja Iglesias		(substituted on) 90+7'
Manager:
Luis de la Fuente

Man of the Match:
Rodri (Spain)

Assistant referees:
Gary Beswick (England)
Adam Nunn (England)
Fourth official:
Felix Zwayer (Germany)
Reserve assistant referee:
Robert Kempter (Germany)
Video assistant referee:
Bastian Dankert (Germany)
Assistant video assistant referee:
Antonio García (Uruguay)
Support video assistant referee:
Marco Di Bello (Italy)

=== United States vs Belgium ===
Matt Freese committing an error that led to Belgium's third goal by Hans Vanaken during the match.

The teams had previously faced each other seven times, most recently on March 28, a 5–2 win for Belgium in a friendly. They had also met twice in the FIFA World Cup: a 3–0 group stage win for the United States at the first World Cup (their only win ever against Belgium) and a 2–1 round of 16 win for Belgium in 2014. The reversal of the suspension for Folarin Balogun, who received a red card in his previous match against Bosnia and Herzegovina, has drawn condemnation of political manipulation from UEFA and the Royal Belgian Football Association, whose appeal was overturned.

In the 9th minute, Belgium took the lead when Charles De Ketelaere side-footed low to the net from three yards out after a low cross from the left by Nicolas Raskin. The score was 1–1 in the 31st minute when a long-range free kick from Malik Tillman deflected off Hans Vanaken past Thibaut Courtois and into the net. Two minutes later, Belgium went back in front when De Ketelaere got his second goal by heading in at the back post to the right of the net after a cross from the left by Leandro Trossard.

In the 57th minute, Hans Vanaken made it 3–1 when he shot low to the right of the net from outside the penalty area after an error in possession by US goalkeeper Matt Freese. Romelu Lukaku got a fourth goal for Belgium in the third minute of added time when he cut in from the left before scoring with a low shot to the right corner from inside the penalty area.

The United States was the final co-host to be eliminated after Canada fell to Morocco and Mexico lost to England, with all three exits occurring in the Round of 16. Folarin Balogun's participation proved insignificant, as he and the rest of the U.S. team struggled for most of the match while Belgium easily breached the host team's defense.

The United States registered its largest margin of defeat in a World Cup match since a 3–0 loss to the Czech Republic in 2006, and its worst goals-against performance in a World Cup match since a 5–1 defeat to Czechoslovakia in 1990.

July 6, 2026
5:00 p.m. UTC−7

United States	1–4	Belgium
Tillman 31'	(Note: "USA vs Belgium | Round of 16 | FIFA World Cup 2026". FIFA. Retrieved July 7, 2026.; "Match Report – Round of 16 – USA v. Belgium". FIFA. July 7, 2026. Retrieved July 7, 2026.; "Post match summary report – Round of 16 – USA v. Belgium". FIFA. July 7, 2026. Retrieved July 7, 2026.)	De Ketelaere 9', 33'; Vanaken 57'; Lukaku 90+3'

Lumen Field, Seattle
Attendance: 66,925
Referee: Adham Makhadmeh (Jordan)

United States	Belgium

GK	24	Matt Freese
CB	16	Alex Freeman
CB	3	Chris Richards
CB	13	Tim Ream (c)
RM	2	Sergiño Dest		(substituted off) 46'
CM	17	Malik Tillman	(yellow card) 69'
CM	4	Tyler Adams		(substituted off) 72'
CM	8	Weston McKennie	(yellow card) 35'
LM	5	Antonee Robinson		(substituted off) 90+2'
CF	10	Christian Pulisic		(substituted off) 59'
CF	20	Folarin Balogun		(substituted off) 90+2'
Substitutions:
MF	7	Giovanni Reyna		(substituted on) 46'
MF	14	Sebastian Berhalter		(substituted on) 59'
FW	9	Ricardo Pepi		(substituted on) 72'
FW	19	Haji Wright		(substituted on) 90+2'
DF	18	Max Arfsten		(substituted on) 90+2'
Manager:
(Argentina) Mauricio Pochettino

GK	1	Thibaut Courtois
RB	21	Timothy Castagne
CB	25	Nathan Ngoy
CB	4	Brandon Mechele
LB	5	Maxim De Cuyper
CM	24	Amadou Onana	(substituted off) 21'
CM	23	Nicolas Raskin	(substituted off) 89'
RW	14	Dodi Lukébakio	(substituted off) 67'
AM	8	Youri Tielemans (c)
LW	10	Leandro Trossard	(substituted off) 89'
CF	17	Charles De Ketelaere	(substituted off) 67'
Substitutions:
MF	20	Hans Vanaken	(substituted on) 21'
FW	11	Jérémy Doku	(substituted on) 67'
FW	9	Romelu Lukaku	(substituted on) 67'
MF	22	Alexis Saelemaekers	(substituted on) 89'
MF	6	Axel Witsel	(substituted on) 89'
Manager:
(France) Rudi Garcia

Man of the Match:
Charles De Ketelaere (Belgium)

Assistant referees:
Mohammad Al-Kalaf (Jordan)
Ahmad Al-Roalle (Jordan)
Fourth official:
Pierre Atcho (Gabon)
Reserve assistant referee:
Boris Ditsoga (Gabon)
Video assistant referee:
Khamis Al-Marri (Qatar)
Assistant video assistant referee:
Nicolás Gallo (Colombia)
Support video assistant referee:
Hernán Mastrángelo (Argentina)

=== Argentina vs Egypt ===
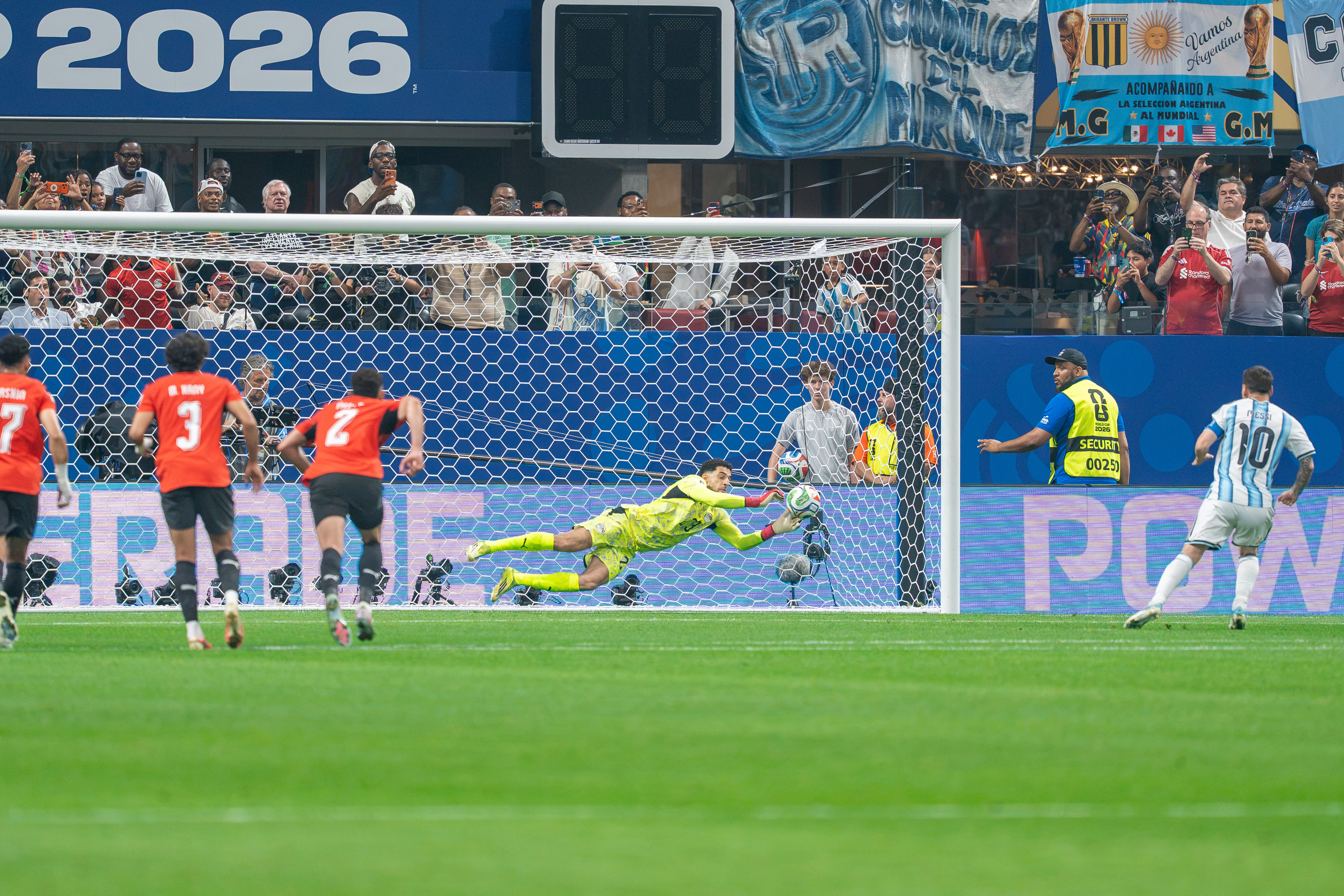
Mostafa Shobeir saving the Lionel Messi penalty during the match.

Argentina had faced Egypt twice previously, a 6–0 victory in the semifinals of the 1928 Summer Olympics, and a 2–0 friendly win in 2008.

In the 15th minute Egypt went in front when Yasser Ibrahim headed into the right corner of the net from six yards out after a cross from the right by Marwan Attia. Six minutes later, Argentina was awarded a penalty when Haissem Hassan tripped Nicolás Tagliafico on the right of the penalty area. Lionel Messi took the penalty, which was saved by Egyptian goalkeeper Mostafa Shobeir down low to his left.

A second goal for Egypt, scored by Mostafa Ziko in the 60th minute after a counter-attack was ruled out after a VAR review brought it back for a foul on Lisandro Martínez at the start of the move. In the 67th minute Ziko made it 2–0 when he finished from six yards out after a low cross from Haissem Hassan from the right.

In the 79th minute Argentina pulled a goal back when Cristian Romero headed powerfully to the right of the net from six yards out after a cross from the right from Messi. In the 83rd minute, Messi made it 2–2 when he half-volleyed the ball high in off the underside of the crossbar from twelve yards out on the right of the penalty area. In the 92nd minute, Argentina broke and Lautaro Martínez crossed from the right for Enzo Fernández to head into the right corner of the net from seven yards out to win the game 3–2 for Argentina. The winning goal was the 3,000th goal in tournament history.

July 7, 2026
12:00 p.m. UTC−4

Argentina	3–2	Egypt
Romero 79'; Messi 83'; Fernández 90+2'	(Note: "Argentina vs Egypt | Round of 16 | FIFA World Cup 2026". FIFA. Retrieved July 7, 2026.; "Match Report – Round of 16 – Argentina v. Egypt". FIFA. July 7, 2026. Retrieved July 7, 2026.; "Post match summary report – Round of 16 – Argentina v. Egypt". FIFA. July 7, 2026. Retrieved July 9, 2026.)	Ibrahim 15'; Ziko 67'

Mercedes-Benz Stadium, Atlanta
Attendance: 68,239
Referee: François Letexier (France)

Argentina	Egypt

GK	23	Emiliano Martínez
RB	26	Nahuel Molina	(substituted off) 73'
CB	13	Cristian Romero	(substituted off) 90+5'
CB	6	Lisandro Martínez
LB	3	Nicolás Tagliafico	(substituted off) 66'
DM	5	Leandro Paredes
CM	7	Rodrigo De Paul	(substituted off) 66'
CM	24	Enzo Fernández
CM	20	Alexis Mac Allister
CF	10	Lionel Messi (c)
CF	9	Julián Alvarez	(substituted off) 90+5'
Substitutions:
FW	22	Lautaro Martínez	(substituted on) 66'
MF	15	Nicolás González	(substituted on) 66'
DF	4	Gonzalo Montiel	(substituted on) 73'
DF	19	Nicolás Otamendi	(substituted on) 90+5'
DF	25	Facundo Medina	(substituted on) 90+5'
Manager:
Lionel Scaloni

GK	23	Mostafa Shobeir	(yellow card) 90+3'
RB	3	Mohamed Hany
CB	5	Ramy Rabia
CB	2	Yasser Ibrahim
LB	15	Karim Hafez
CM	17	Mohanad Lasheen		(substituted off) 90+6'
CM	19	Marwan Attia	(yellow card) 90+8'
RW	12	Haissem Hassan	(yellow card) FT	(substituted off) 73'
AM	10	Mohamed Salah (c)
LW	8	Emam Ashour		(substituted off) 46'
CF	11	Mostafa Ziko		(substituted off) 80'
Substitutions:
MF	14	Hamdy Fathy	(yellow card) 90+4'	(substituted on) 46'
FW	7	Trézéguet		(substituted on) 73'
FW	22	Omar Marmoush		(substituted on) 80'
FW	25	Zizo		(substituted on) 90+6'
Other disciplinary actions:
TS	—	Saafan El-Sagheer	(yellow card) 21' (red card) 90+4'
Manager:
Hossam Hassan			(yellow card) 90+9'

Man of the Match:
Lionel Messi (Argentina)

Assistant referees:
Cyril Mugnier (France)
Mehdi Rahmouni (France)
Fourth official:
Espen Eskås (Norway)
Reserve assistant referee:
Isaak Bashevkin (Norway)
Video assistant referee:
Jérôme Brisard (France)
Assistant video assistant referee:
Willy Delajod (France)
Support video assistant referee:
Bram Van Driessche (Belgium)

=== Switzerland vs Colombia ===
The teams had met four times prior, including Colombia's 2–0 group stage victory at the 1994 FIFA World Cup. Their most recent meeting was also won by Colombia, a 3–1 friendly in 2007.

With this game, Colombia became the only team in the 2026 World Cup to play matches in all three host countries—Canada, Mexico, and the United States.

The game finished 0–0 after extra time and went to a penalty shoot-out. Colombia's Davinson Sánchez missed his penalty when he hit the underside of the bar with the ball bouncing back out, Switzerland's Manuel Akanji also missed when he kicked high over the bar. Switzerland goalkeeper Gregor Kobel saved down to his right from Cucho Hernández, with Rubén Vargas scoring the winning penalty with a shot low to the left, sending the goalkeeper the wrong way.

Switzerland reached the quarterfinals for the fourth time (after 1934, 1938, and 1954), their first in 72 years (since 1954, when it hosted the tournament). Colombia's elimination from the tournament meant that Argentina would be the sole representative from the Americas to advance to the quarterfinals following their win against Egypt.

This was the final game of the tournament played in Canada, as the remaining knockout matches—the quarterfinals, semifinals, third-place playoff, and final—were played entirely in the United States.

July 7, 2026
1:00 p.m. UTC−7

Switzerland	0–0 (a.e.t.)	Colombia
	(Note: "Switzerland vs Colombia | Round of 16 | FIFA World Cup 2026". FIFA. Retrieved July 7, 2026.; "Match Report – Round of 16 – Switzerland v. Colombia". FIFA. July 7, 2026. Retrieved July 7, 2026.; "Post match summary report – Round of 16 – Switzerland v. Colombia". FIFA. July 7, 2026. Retrieved July 9, 2026.)
Penalties
Xhaka (penalty scored); Amdouni (penalty scored); Akanji (penalty missed); Itten (penalty scored); Vargas (penalty scored)	4–3	(penalty scored) Quintero; (penalty missed) Sánchez; (penalty scored) Campaz; (penalty missed) Hernández; (penalty scored) Díaz

BC Place, Vancouver
Attendance: 52,497
Referee: Iván Barton (El Salvador)

Switzerland	Colombia

GK	1	Gregor Kobel
RB	6	Denis Zakaria	(yellow card) 59'	(substituted off) 87'
CB	5	Manuel Akanji
CB	4	Nico Elvedi
LB	13	Ricardo Rodriguez		(substituted off) 71'
DM	10	Granit Xhaka (c)	(yellow card) 51'
CM	8	Remo Freuler
CM	14	Ardon Jashari		(substituted off) 46'
RF	22	Fabian Rieder		(substituted off) 103'
CF	7	Breel Embolo		(substituted off) 87'
LF	11	Dan Ndoye		(substituted off) 90+1'
Substitutions:
MF	15	Djibril Sow		(substituted on) 46'
DF	2	Miro Muheim	(yellow card) 105'	(substituted on) 71'
FW	26	Cedric Itten		(substituted on) 87'
DF	3	Silvan Widmer		(substituted on) 87'
FW	17	Rubén Vargas		(substituted on) 90+1'
FW	23	Zeki Amdouni		(substituted on) 103'
Manager:
Murat Yakin

GK	12	Camilo Vargas
RB	2	Daniel Muñoz
CB	23	Davinson Sánchez	(yellow card) 94'
CB	3	Jhon Lucumí		(substituted off) 118'
LB	17	Johan Mojica
DM	16	Jefferson Lerma		(substituted off) 82'
CM	11	Jhon Arias		(substituted off) 66'
CM	14	Gustavo Puerta
RF	10	James Rodríguez (c)		(substituted off) 66'
CF	25	Luis Suárez	(yellow card) 60'	(substituted off) 82'
LF	7	Luis Díaz
Substitutions:
MF	20	Juan Fernando Quintero		(substituted on) 66'
FW	21	Jaminton Campaz		(substituted on) 66'
MF	6	Richard Ríos		(substituted on) 82'
FW	19	Cucho Hernández		(substituted on) 82'
DF	13	Yerry Mina		(substituted on) 118'
Other disciplinary actions:
TS	—	Luis Amaranto Perea	(yellow card) 95'
Manager:
(Argentina) Néstor Lorenzo

Man of the Match:
Gregor Kobel (Switzerland)

Assistant referees:
David Morán (El Salvador)
Henry Pupiro (Nicaragua)
Fourth official:
Katia Itzel García (Mexico)
Reserve assistant referee:
Sandra Ramírez (Mexico)
Video assistant referee:
Guillermo Pacheco (Mexico)
Assistant video assistant referee:
Armando Villarreal (United States)
Support video assistant referee:
Ivan Bebek (Croatia)

== Quarterfinals ==
=== France vs Morocco ===
During the match between France and Morocco.

The two teams had met six times before, with France winning four matches. Their most recent meeting took place in the semifinals of the last World Cup, when France won 2–0.

In the 28th minute, France was awarded a penalty when Kylian Mbappé was fouled inside the penalty area on the left by Noussair Mazraoui. After a delay of over three minutes, Mbappé took the penalty and shot low to the right which was saved by Moroccan goalkeeper Yassine Bounou. Désiré Doué also had a low shot to the left from inside the penalty area saved by Bounou. In first-half stoppage time Lucas Digne hit a long range swerving shot from the left off the top of the crossbar and over.

In the 60th minute, France went in front when Mbappé received the ball from Doué on the left before curling a shot from just inside the penalty area into the top right corner of the net. It was his eighth goal of the World Cup. Six minutes later it was 2–0 when Ousmane Dembélé scored with a low shot from just outside the penalty area to the right corner which Bounou got a hand to but couldn't keep out. Morocco was missing injured forward Ismael Saibari and failed to get a shot on target until the 84th minute. As a result, this was the first time it failed to advance further in the knockout stage after its surprising success in 2022 where they finished fourth.

July 9, 2026
4:00 p.m. UTC−4

France	2–0	Morocco
Mbappé 60'; Dembélé 66'	(Note: "France vs Morocco | Quarter-final | FIFA World Cup 2026". FIFA. Retrieved July 9, 2026.; "Match Report – Quarter-final – France v. Morocco". FIFA. July 9, 2026. Retrieved July 9, 2026.; "Post match summary report – Quarter-final – France v. Morocco". FIFA. July 9, 2026. Retrieved July 10, 2026.)

Gillette Stadium, Foxborough
Attendance: 63,811
Referee: Facundo Tello (Argentina)

France	Morocco

GK	16	Mike Maignan
RB	5	Jules Koundé	(substituted off) 87'
CB	4	Dayot Upamecano
CB	17	William Saliba
LB	3	Lucas Digne
CM	6	Manu Koné	(substituted off) 71'
CM	14	Adrien Rabiot
RW	7	Ousmane Dembélé
AM	11	Michael Olise
LW	20	Désiré Doué	(substituted off) 77'
CF	10	Kylian Mbappé (c)	(substituted off) 77'
Substitutions:
MF	18	Warren Zaïre-Emery	(substituted on) 71'
FW	22	Jean-Philippe Mateta	(substituted on) 77'
FW	12	Bradley Barcola	(substituted on) 77'
DF	2	Malo Gusto	(substituted on) 87'
Manager:
Didier Deschamps

GK	1	Yassine Bounou
RB	2	Achraf Hakimi (c)
CB	14	Issa Diop	(yellow card) 63'
CB	3	Noussair Mazraoui
LB	26	Anass Salah-Eddine		(substituted off) 74'
CM	6	Ayyoub Bouaddi		(substituted off) 62'
CM	24	Neil El Aynaoui
RW	10	Brahim Díaz		(substituted off) 74'
AM	8	Azzedine Ounahi
LW	7	Chemsdine Talbi		(substituted off) 85'
CF	23	Bilal El Khannouss		(substituted off) 62'
Substitutions:
MF	4	Sofyan Amrabat		(substituted on) 62'
FW	9	Soufiane Rahimi		(substituted on) 62'
DF	13	Zakaria El Ouahdi		(substituted on) 74'
MF	16	Gessime Yassine		(substituted on) 74'
FW	17	Amine Sbaï		(substituted on) 85'
Manager:
Mohamed Ouahbi

Man of the Match:
Kylian Mbappé (France)

Assistant referees:
Juan Pablo Belatti (Argentina)
Gabriel Chade (Argentina)
Fourth official:
Darío Herrera (Argentina)
Reserve assistant referee:
Cristian Navarro (Argentina)
Video assistant referee:
Hernán Mastrángelo (Argentina)
Assistant video assistant referee:
Leodán González (Uruguay)
Support video assistant referee:
Tatiana Guzmán (Nicaragua)

=== Spain vs Belgium ===
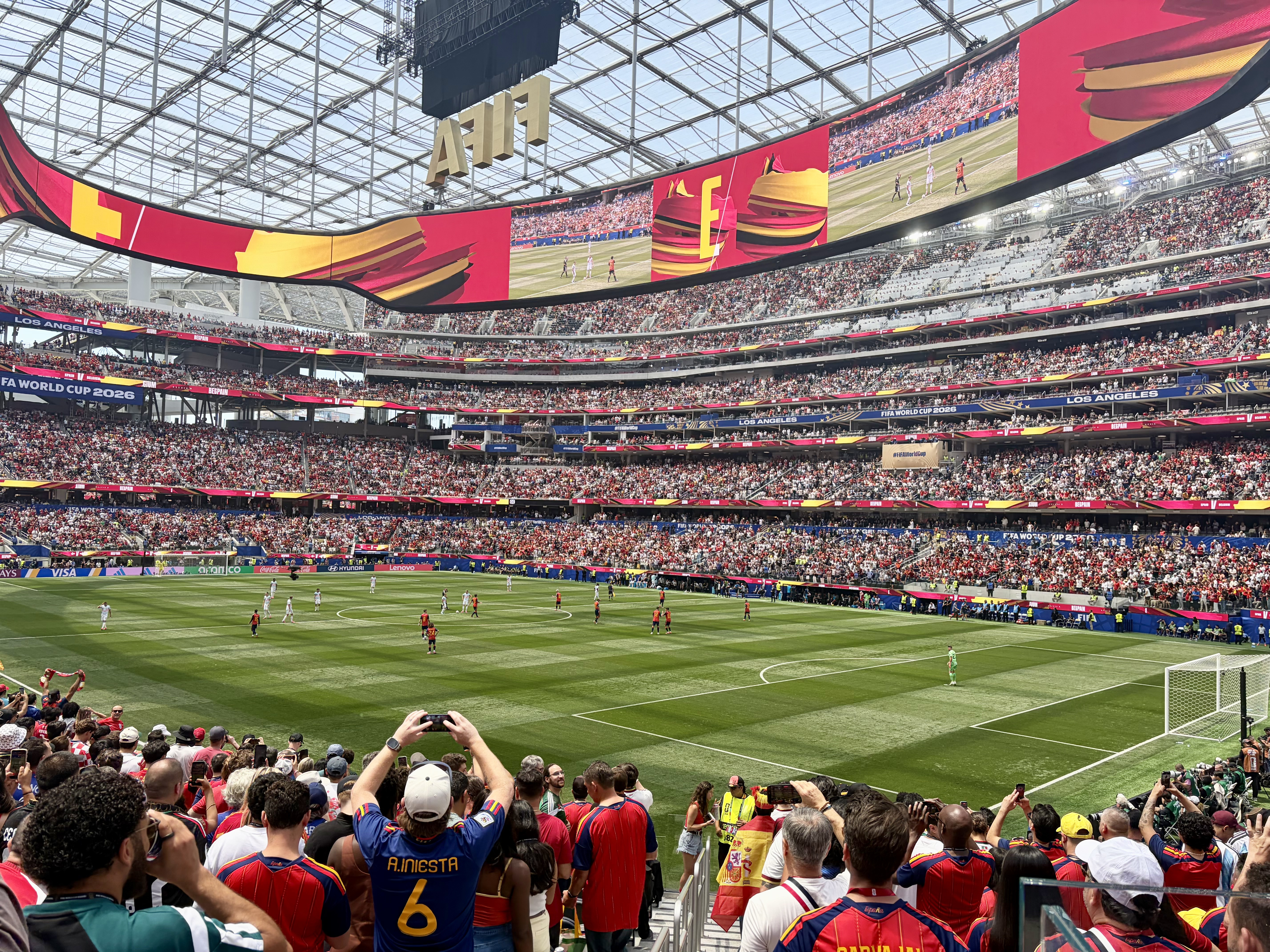
SoFi Stadium during the match between Spain and Belgium.

The teams had previously met 23 times, including twice in the World Cup: a 1–1 quarterfinal draw (Belgium won 5–4 on penalties) in 1986 and a 2–1 group stage win for Spain in 1990. Their most recent meeting took place in 2016, when Spain won 2–0 in a friendly match.

In the 30th minute, Fabián Ruiz gave Spain the lead when he finished right-footed to the net from six yards out after Belgian goalkeeper Thibaut Courtois had parried out a low shot from Dani Olmo. It was 1–1 in the 41st minute when Charles De Ketelaere headed powerfully to the left of the net from six yards out after a cross from the right by Timothy Castagne, it was the first goal Spain had conceded in 649 minutes of World Cup football.

In the 71st minute Thibaut Courtois picked up a thigh injury and was replaced by Senne Lammens. In the 88th minute, Lammens spilled a long range shot from Pau Cubarsí with Mikel Merino getting to the ball first to finish to the net from six yards out to win the match for Spain. Merino had only been on the pitch for 117 seconds after replacing Dani Olmo.

This was the only match in the entire tournament where Spain conceded a goal.

July 10, 2026
12:00 p.m. UTC−7

Spain	2–1	Belgium
Fabián 30'; Merino 88'	(Note: "Spain vs Belgium | Quarter-final | FIFA World Cup 2026". FIFA. Retrieved July 10, 2026.; "Match Report – Quarter-final – Spain v. Belgium". FIFA. July 10, 2026. Retrieved July 10, 2026.; "Post match summary report – Quarter-final – Spain v. Belgium". FIFA. July 11, 2026. Retrieved July 11, 2026.)	De Ketelaere 41'

SoFi Stadium, Inglewood
Attendance: 70,492
Referee: Michael Oliver (England)

Spain	Belgium

GK	23	Unai Simón
RB	12	Pedro Porro
CB	22	Pau Cubarsí	(yellow card) 43'
CB	14	Aymeric Laporte	(yellow card) 90+3'
LB	24	Marc Cucurella
CM	16	Rodri (c)
CM	8	Fabián Ruiz		(substituted off) 55'
RW	19	Lamine Yamal
AM	10	Dani Olmo		(substituted off) 86'
LW	15	Álex Baena		(substituted off) 55'
CF	21	Mikel Oyarzabal		(substituted off) 79'
Substitutions:
FW	7	Ferran Torres		(substituted on) 55'
MF	20	Pedri		(substituted on) 55'
FW	17	Nico Williams		(substituted on) 79'
MF	6	Mikel Merino		(substituted on) 86'
Manager:
Luis de la Fuente

GK	1	Thibaut Courtois		(substituted off) 71'
RB	21	Timothy Castagne
CB	25	Nathan Ngoy
CB	4	Brandon Mechele
LB	5	Maxim De Cuyper		(substituted off) 60'
CM	20	Hans Vanaken		(substituted off) 60'
CM	23	Nicolas Raskin
RW	10	Leandro Trossard		(substituted off) 60'
AM	7	Kevin De Bruyne (c)	(yellow card) 85'	(substituted off) 86'
LW	11	Jérémy Doku
CF	17	Charles De Ketelaere
Substitutions:
MF	6	Axel Witsel	(yellow card) 90+5'	(substituted on) 60'
DF	18	Joaquin Seys		(substituted on) 60'
FW	9	Romelu Lukaku		(substituted on) 60'
GK	12	Senne Lammens		(substituted on) 71'
MF	22	Alexis Saelemaekers		(substituted on) 86'
Manager:
(France) Rudi Garcia

Man of the Match:
Lamine Yamal (Spain)

Assistant referees:
Stuart Burt (England)
James Mainwaring (England)
Fourth official:
Ramon Abatti (Brazil)
Reserve assistant referee:
Rafael Alves (Brazil)
Video assistant referee:
Jarred Gillett (England)
Assistant video assistant referee:
Ivan Bebek (Croatia)
Support video assistant referee:
Joe Dickerson (United States)

=== Norway vs England ===
The teams had previously faced each other 12 times, most recently in 2014, a 1–0 win for England in a friendly match.

Norway went ahead after 36 minutes when Andreas Schjelderup's left-footed strike from out on the left of the penalty area went over England goalkeeper Jordan Pickford and into the right corner of the net. England restored parity in first-half stoppage time when Jude Bellingham took a pass from Anthony Gordon and got into the left of the penalty area before shooting left-footed to the right of the net past Norway goalkeeper Ørjan Nyland.

Declan Rice, who had been struggling with illness and injury leading into the fixture, was substituted at halftime, as well as Noni Madueke, being replaced with Eberechi Eze and Bukayo Saka.

In the second half, a goal by Norway midfielder Torbjørn Heggem was ruled out due to Erling Haaland fouling midfielder Elliot Anderson, and David Møller Wolfe's header struck the bar.

In extra time, Bellingham scored the second goal for England when Nyland parried a shot towards him from substitute Morgan Rogers, with Bellingham finishing low to the net form six yards out. The Norwegians claimed the ball struck one of the Spidercam wires in the build-up to Bellingham's equalizing goal, but Snickometer ruled there was no contact. Had the decision been made that the ball struck the wire, the goal would have been ruled out and play restarted with a dropped ball.

Jude Bellingham's two goals meant this England team was the first in FIFA World Cup history to have two players score six or more goals in a tournament, with Harry Kane having reached six in the previous match against Mexico. Also, Bellingham's six goals in the tournament, none of which were penalties, is the joint-most non-penalty goals by an England player in a major men's tournament, along with Gary Lineker in the 1986 edition of the tournament.

July 11, 2026
5:00 p.m. UTC−4

Norway	1–2 (a.e.t.)	England
Schjelderup 36'	(Note: "Norway vs England | Quarter-final | FIFA World Cup 2026". FIFA. Retrieved July 11, 2026.; "Match Report – Quarter-final – Norway v. England". FIFA. July 11, 2026. Retrieved July 11, 2026.; "Post match summary report – Quarter-final – Norway v. England". FIFA. July 11, 2026. Retrieved July 12, 2026.)	Bellingham 45+2', 93'

Hard Rock Stadium, Miami Gardens
Attendance: 64,478
Referee: Clément Turpin (France)

Norway	England

GK	1	Ørjan Nyland
RB	26	Julian Ryerson		(substituted off) 60'
CB	3	Kristoffer Ajer	(yellow card) 117'
CB	17	Torbjørn Heggem		(substituted off) 91'
LB	5	David Møller Wolfe		(substituted off) 90'
DM	8	Sander Berge
CM	10	Martin Ødegaard (c)
CM	6	Patrick Berg
RF	7	Alexander Sørloth		(substituted off) 67'
CF	9	Erling Haaland		(substituted off) 106'
LF	21	Andreas Schjelderup		(substituted off) 67'
Substitutions:
MF	14	Fredrik Aursnes		(substituted on) 60'
MF	22	Oscar Bobb		(substituted on) 67'
FW	20	Antonio Nusa		(substituted on) 67'
DF	16	Marcus Holmgren Pedersen		(substituted on) 90'
DF	4	Leo Østigård		(substituted on) 91'
FW	11	Jørgen Strand Larsen		(substituted on) 106'
Manager:
Ståle Solbakken

GK	1	Jordan Pickford
RB	2	Ezri Konsa	(substituted off) 89'
CB	5	John Stones
CB	6	Marc Guéhi
LB	3	Nico O'Reilly	(substituted off) 86'
CM	8	Elliot Anderson
CM	4	Declan Rice	(substituted off) 46'
RW	20	Noni Madueke	(substituted off) 46'
AM	10	Jude Bellingham	(substituted off) 111'
LW	18	Anthony Gordon	(substituted off) 71'
CF	9	Harry Kane (c)
Substitutions:
FW	7	Bukayo Saka	(substituted on) 46'
MF	21	Eberechi Eze	(substituted on) 46'
DF	24	Reece James	(substituted on) 71'
DF	25	Djed Spence	(substituted on) 86'
MF	17	Morgan Rogers	(substituted on) 89'
DF	15	Dan Burn	(substituted on) 111'
Manager:
(Germany) Thomas Tuchel

Man of the Match:
Jude Bellingham (England)

Assistant referees:
Nicolas Danos (France)
Benjamin Pagès (France)
Fourth official:
Alejandro Hernández Hernández (Spain)
Reserve assistant referee:
José Enrique Naranjo Pérez (Spain)
Video assistant referee:
Jérôme Brisard (France)
Assistant video assistant referee:
Armando Villarreal (United States)
Support video assistant referee:
Carlos del Cerro Grande (Spain)

=== Argentina vs Switzerland ===
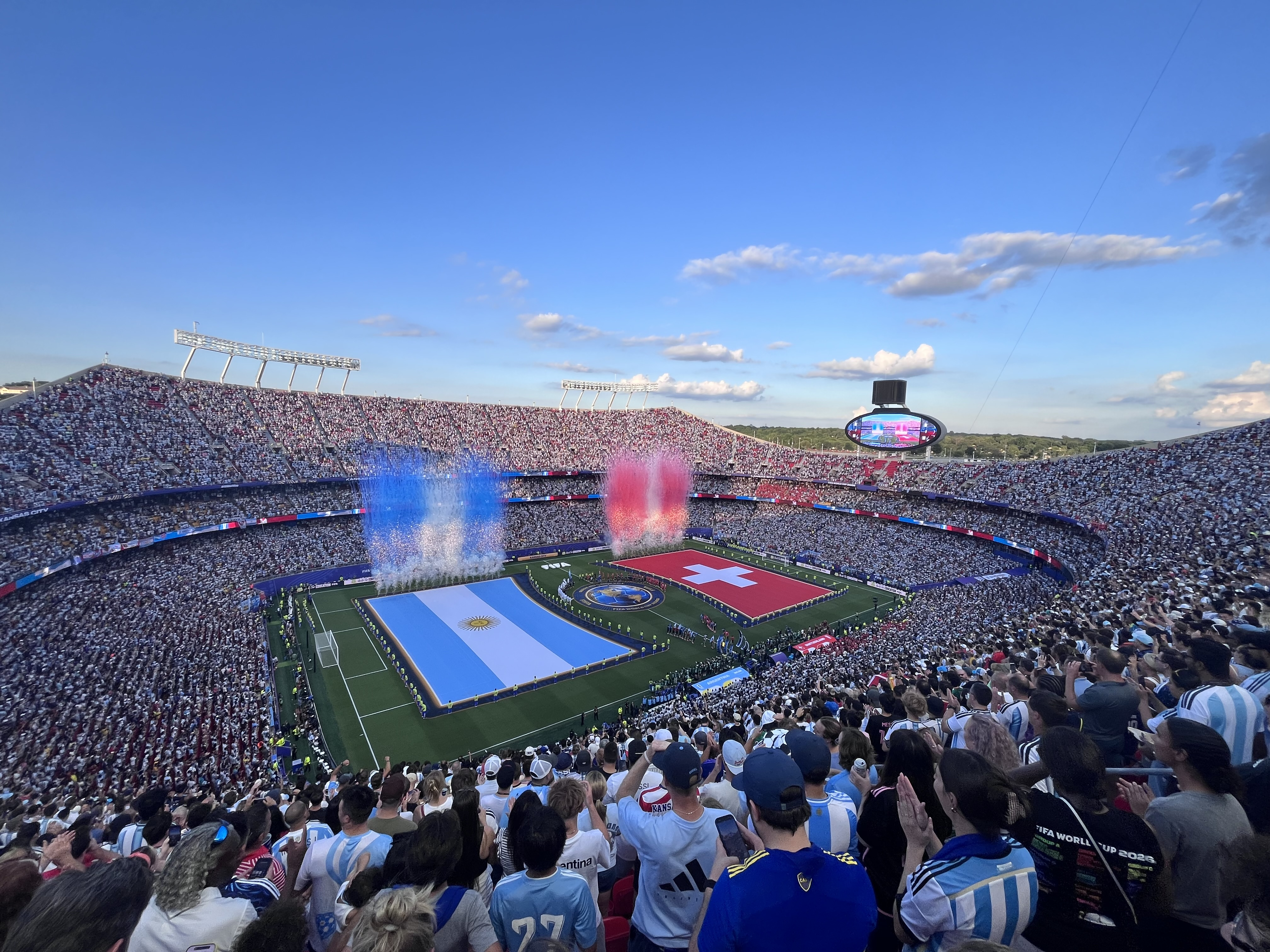
Pre-match ceremony between Argentina and Switzerland.

This was Switzerland's first World Cup quarterfinal since the 1954 edition of the tournament.

Argentina had never lost to Switzerland in their seven previous encounters, winning five of those matches. Their first meeting took place at the 1966 FIFA World Cup, when Argentina won 2–0 in the group stage and their latest match was also at the World Cup, a round of 16 1–0 win (after extra time) in 2014.

Alexis Mac Allister opened the scoring for Argentina after 10 minutes when he scored with a header to the right corner of the net after a corner kick taken from Lionel Messi from the left. Half way through the second half, shortly after Dan Ndoye scored the equalizer for Switzerland when he finished low to the net from the left of the penalty area. In the 72nd minute, Leandro Paredes was shown a yellow card for a tackle on Breel Embolo–however, VAR revealed Embolo falling before Paredes made any contact. Since Embolo had already received a booking, he was sent off. It was the second time a yellow card had been overturned at the tournament due to the "mistaken identity" protocol.

The match went into extra-time and Argentina went 2–1 in front in the 112th minute when Julián Alvarez scored with a right footed shot to the top right corner of the net from 25 yards out on the left. It was 3–1 in the 121st minute when Lautaro Martínez side-footed into the right corner of the net from twelve yards out after the ball broke to him in the penalty area from a counter-attack.

The match ended Lionel Messi's record run of scoring in nine consecutive FIFA World Cup matches, stretching back to the Round of 16 match against Australia in 2022.

July 11, 2026
8:00 p.m. UTC−5

Argentina	3–1 (a.e.t.)	Switzerland
Mac Allister 10'; Alvarez 112'; La. Martínez 120+1'	(Note: "Argentina vs Switzerland | Quarter-final | FIFA World Cup 2026". FIFA. Retrieved July 12, 2026.; "Match Report – Quarter-final – Argentina v. Switzerland". FIFA. July 12, 2026. Retrieved July 12, 2026.; "Post match summary report – Quarter-final – Argentina v. Switzerland". FIFA. July 12, 2026. Retrieved July 12, 2026.)	Ndoye 67'

Arrowhead Stadium, Kansas City
Attendance: 69,045
Referee: João Pinheiro (Portugal)

Argentina	Switzerland

GK	23	Emiliano Martínez
RB	26	Nahuel Molina		(substituted off) 85'
CB	13	Cristian Romero		(substituted off) 106'
CB	6	Lisandro Martínez
LB	3	Nicolás Tagliafico		(substituted off) 78'
DM	5	Leandro Paredes		(substituted off) 110'
CM	7	Rodrigo De Paul		(substituted off) 85'
CM	24	Enzo Fernández		(substituted off) 91'
CM	20	Alexis Mac Allister
CF	10	Lionel Messi (c)
CF	9	Julián Alvarez
Substitutions:
MF	15	Nicolás González		(substituted on) 78'
DF	4	Gonzalo Montiel		(substituted on) 85'
FW	22	Lautaro Martínez	(yellow card) 98'	(substituted on) 85'
FW	16	Thiago Almada	(yellow card) 97'	(substituted on) 91'
DF	19	Nicolás Otamendi		(substituted on) 106'
FW	21	José Manuel López	(yellow card) 114'	(substituted on) 110'
Manager:
Lionel Scaloni

GK	1	Gregor Kobel
RB	6	Denis Zakaria		(substituted off) 96'
CB	4	Nico Elvedi
CB	5	Manuel Akanji
LB	13	Ricardo Rodriguez		(substituted off) 90+5'
CM	8	Remo Freuler		(substituted off) 115'
CM	10	Granit Xhaka (c)
RW	15	Djibril Sow		(substituted off) 86'
AM	22	Fabian Rieder		(substituted off) 86'
LW	11	Dan Ndoye		(substituted off) 86'
CF	7	Breel Embolo	(yellow card) 44' (yellow-red card) 72'
Substitutions:
DF	3	Silvan Widmer		(substituted on) 86'
FW	23	Zeki Amdouni		(substituted on) 86'
DF	2	Miro Muheim		(substituted on) 86'
DF	18	Eray Cömert		(substituted on) 90+5'
MF	14	Ardon Jashari		(substituted on) 96'
FW	17	Rubén Vargas		(substituted on) 115'
Manager:
Murat Yakin

Man of the Match:
Julián Alvarez (Argentina)

Assistant referees:
Bruno Jesus (Portugal)
Luciano Maia (Portugal)
Fourth official:
Drew Fischer (Canada)
Reserve assistant referee:
Micheal Barwegen (Canada)
Video assistant referee:
Guillermo Pacheco (Mexico)
Assistant video assistant referee:
Juan Lara (Chile)
Support video assistant referee:
Marco Di Bello (Italy)

== Semifinals ==
This was the first time in tournament history that the top four teams in the FIFA Men's World Ranking (as of the first match of the tournament) all qualified for the World Cup semifinals. It was also only the third time in tournament history in which all four semifinalists were previous champions (along with the 1970 and 1990 editions).

=== France vs Spain ===
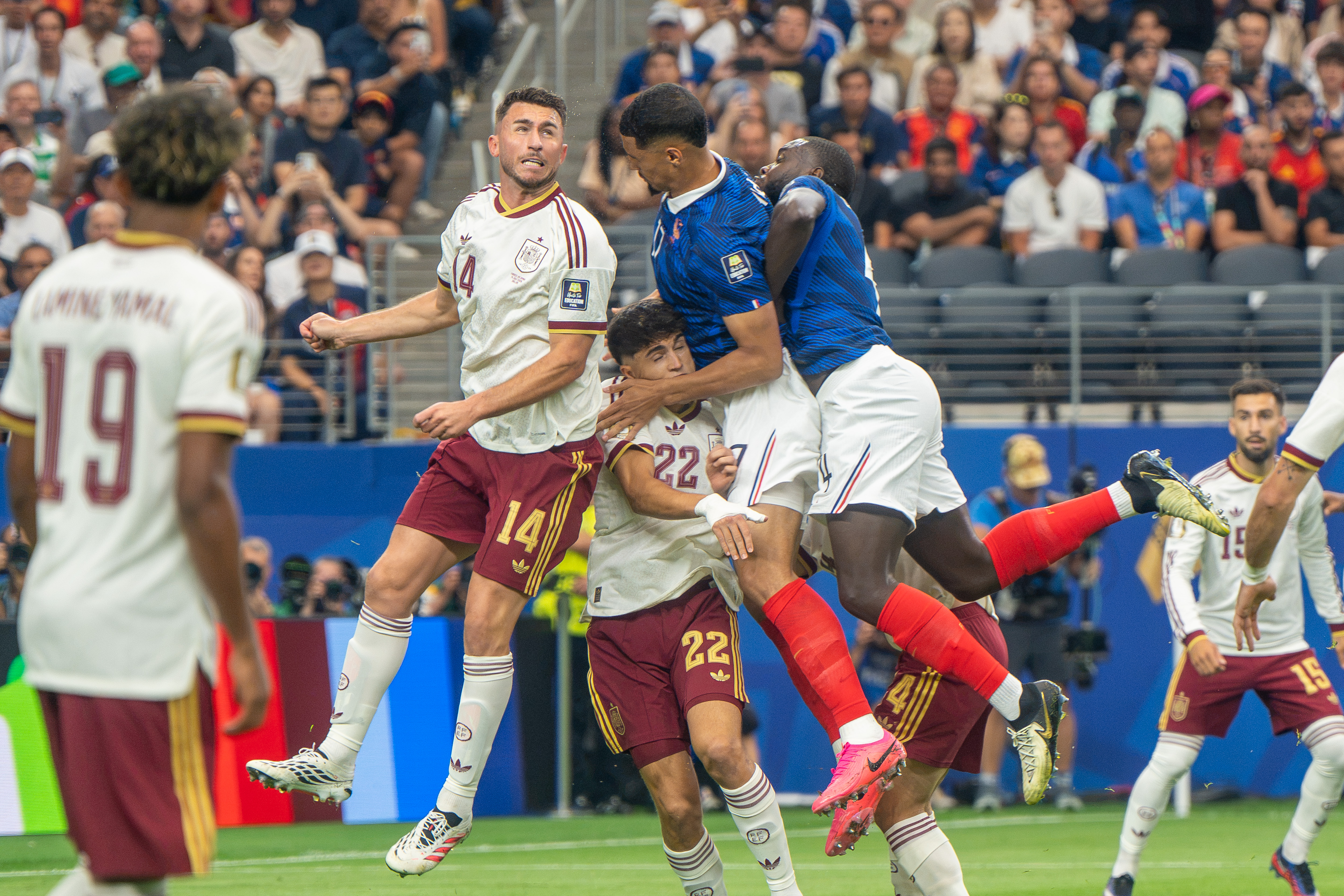
During the match between France and Spain.

France and Spain had faced each other in 38 previous matches since 1922, including the UEFA Euro 1984 final (when host France won 2–0) and a 3–1 round of 16 win for France at the 2006 FIFA World Cup. Their latest encounter in a major tournament was at the UEFA Euro 2024 semifinals, won 2–1 by Spain.

In the 22nd minute, Spain was awarded a penalty when Lucas Digne kicked Lamine Yamal with his swinging left leg when trying to clear the ball. Mikel Oyarzabal scored the penalty with a powerful shot to the right of the net to make it 1–0. In the 58th minute it was 2–0 when Pedro Porro played a one-two with Dani Olmo on the edge of the penalty area before a side-foot finish with his right foot to the right corner of the net from the right of the penalty area. The game finished 2–0 and Spain progressed to its second World Cup final.

July 14, 2026
2:00 p.m. UTC−5

France	0–2	Spain
	(Note: "France vs Spain | Semi-final | FIFA World Cup 2026". FIFA. Retrieved July 14, 2026.; "Match Report – Semi-final – France v. Spain". FIFA. July 14, 2026. Retrieved July 14, 2026.; "Post match summary report – Semi-final – France v. Spain". FIFA. July 15, 2026. Retrieved July 15, 2026.)	Oyarzabal 22' (pen.); Porro 58'

AT&T Stadium, Arlington
Attendance: 70,176
Referee: Iván Barton (El Salvador)

France	Spain

GK	16	Mike Maignan
RB	5	Jules Koundé
CB	4	Dayot Upamecano
CB	17	William Saliba		(substituted off) 30'
LB	3	Lucas Digne		(substituted off) 72'
CM	8	Aurélien Tchouaméni
CM	14	Adrien Rabiot	(yellow card) 8'	(substituted off) 46'
RW	7	Ousmane Dembélé
AM	11	Michael Olise		(substituted off) 72'
LW	12	Bradley Barcola		(substituted off) 57'
CF	10	Kylian Mbappé (c)	(yellow card) 86'
Substitutions:
DF	26	Maxence Lacroix		(substituted on) 30'
MF	6	Manu Koné		(substituted on) 46'
FW	20	Désiré Doué		(substituted on) 57'
MF	24	Rayan Cherki		(substituted on) 72'
DF	19	Théo Hernandez		(substituted on) 72'
Manager:
Didier Deschamps

GK	23	Unai Simón
RB	12	Pedro Porro		(substituted off) 83'
CB	22	Pau Cubarsí
CB	14	Aymeric Laporte
LB	24	Marc Cucurella	(yellow card) 31'
DM	16	Rodri (c)
CM	10	Dani Olmo		(substituted off) 77'
CM	8	Fabián Ruiz		(substituted off) 77'
RF	19	Lamine Yamal
CF	21	Mikel Oyarzabal		(substituted off) 74'
LF	15	Álex Baena		(substituted off) 83'
Substitutions:
FW	7	Ferran Torres		(substituted on) 74'
MF	6	Mikel Merino		(substituted on) 77'
MF	20	Pedri		(substituted on) 77'
FW	17	Nico Williams		(substituted on) 83'
DF	5	Marcos Llorente		(substituted on) 83'
Manager:
Luis de la Fuente

Man of the Match:
Pedro Porro (Spain)

Assistant referees:
David Morán (El Salvador)
Henry Pupiro (Nicaragua)
Fourth official:
Glenn Nyberg (Sweden)
Reserve assistant referee:
Mahbod Beigi (Sweden)
Video assistant referee:
Tomasz Kwiatkowski (Poland)
Assistant video assistant referee:
Dennis Higler (Netherlands)
Support video assistant referee:
Guillermo Pacheco (Mexico)

=== England vs Argentina ===
The teams had faced each other in 14 previous matches since 1951, with five of those encounters taking place at the World Cup: a 3–1 group stage win for England in 1962, a 1–0 quarterfinal win for England (as host) in 1966, a 2–1 quarterfinal win for Argentina in 1986 (a match famous for Diego Maradona's "hand of God" goal and the "Goal of the Century"), a 2–2 round of 16 draw (Argentina won 4–3 on penalties) in 1998, and a 1–0 group stage win for England in 2002. Their latest match took place in 2005, a 3–2 win for England in a friendly match.

After a goalless first half, Anthony Gordon put England into the lead in the 55th minute when he finished to the left of the net with his right foot from six yards out after a low cross in by Morgan Rogers from the right. As England looked to hold on to its lead, it went more defensive and switched to a back five. Argentina created chances after that with Jordan Pickford saving down low on the line from a close-range header by Nicolás González. Alexis Mac Allister then saw his diving header from close range strike the left-side post. In the 85th minute, Enzo Fernández received a pass from Lionel Messi just outside the penalty area before shooting right-footed to the left corner of the net to make it 1–1.

In the 92nd minute, Mac Allister saw his low shot from the left hit the right hand post before coming back to Messi, who crossed from the right for Lautaro Martínez to head into the left corner from three yards out to give Argentina a 2–1 lead. Argentina saw out the remainder of the added time to advance to the final against Spain for the second consecutive time. England's defeat ended its hopes of reaching the final and extended its period without a championship to 15 consecutive tournament appearances since 1966. However, England progressed to the third-place playoff against France, marking its first appearance in the bronze-medal match since 2018.

England manager Thomas Tuchel was widely criticized after the match for going too defensive after England took a 1–0 lead with over 30 minutes remaining. Between England scoring and Martínez's winning goal, England had just 12% possession. After the defeat, Tuchel remarked that he fully intended to stay on as England manager, and proceeded to blame the country's "football DNA" for its World Cup exit.

After the match, some Argentine players displayed a banner that read "Las Malvinas son argentinas" ("The Falkland Islands are Argentinian"), in reference to the territory dispute between Argentina and the UK, and later left it on the pitch, in apparent contravention of FIFA rules. FIFA's Stadium Code of Conduct prohibits banners and related paraphernalia that are of a political or discriminatory nature inside stadiums, and the British government immediately urged FIFA to investigate the incident. In a statement after the game, FIFA said: "As is standard procedure, FIFA's independent Disciplinary Committee is currently assessing the match reports and considering the relevant circumstances before deciding on potential further steps based on the FIFA Disciplinary Code." The Argentine Football Association were later fined $321,000 (£235,000) for the incident, of which only $100,000 (£89,000) was an immediate direct fine to FIFA.

July 15, 2026
3:00 p.m. UTC−4

England	1–2	Argentina
Gordon 55'	(Note: "England vs Argentina | Semi-final | FIFA World Cup 2026". FIFA. Retrieved July 15, 2026.; "Match Report – Semi-final – England v. Argentina". FIFA. July 15, 2026. Retrieved July 15, 2026.; "Post match summary report – Semi-final – England v. Argentina". FIFA. July 16, 2026. Retrieved July 16, 2026.)	Fernández 85'; La. Martínez 90+2'

Mercedes-Benz Stadium, Atlanta
Attendance: 68,239
Referee: Ismail Elfath (United States)

England	Argentina

GK	1	Jordan Pickford
RB	24	Reece James		(substituted off) 82'
CB	5	John Stones		(substituted off) 90+6'
CB	6	Marc Guéhi
LB	25	Djed Spence		(substituted off) 90+6'
CM	4	Declan Rice		(substituted off) 82'
CM	8	Elliot Anderson	(yellow card) 37'
RW	17	Morgan Rogers
AM	10	Jude Bellingham
LW	18	Anthony Gordon		(substituted off) 72'
CF	9	Harry Kane (c)
Substitutions:
DF	2	Ezri Konsa		(substituted on) 72'
DF	15	Dan Burn		(substituted on) 82'
DF	3	Nico O'Reilly		(substituted on) 82'
FW	22	Ivan Toney		(substituted on) 90+6'
FW	11	Marcus Rashford		(substituted on) 90+6'
Manager:
(Germany) Thomas Tuchel

GK	23	Emiliano Martínez
RB	26	Nahuel Molina		(substituted off) 72'
CB	13	Cristian Romero	(yellow card) 51'
CB	6	Lisandro Martínez	(yellow card) 42'	(substituted off) 72'
LB	3	Nicolás Tagliafico		(substituted off) 81'
RM	17	Giuliano Simeone		(substituted off) 72'
CM	5	Leandro Paredes		(substituted off) 64'
CM	20	Alexis Mac Allister
LM	24	Enzo Fernández
CF	10	Lionel Messi (c)
CF	9	Julián Alvarez
Substitutions:
MF	15	Nicolás González		(substituted on) 64'
DF	19	Nicolás Otamendi		(substituted on) 72'
MF	7	Rodrigo De Paul	(yellow card) 90+4'	(substituted on) 72'
DF	4	Gonzalo Montiel		(substituted on) 72'
FW	22	Lautaro Martínez		(substituted on) 81'
Manager:
Lionel Scaloni

Man of the Match:
Lionel Messi (Argentina)

Assistant referees:
Corey Parker (United States)
Kyle Atkins (United States)
Fourth official:
Maurizio Mariani (Italy)
Reserve assistant referee:
Daniele Bindoni (Italy)
Video assistant referee:
Marco Di Bello (Italy)
Assistant video assistant referee:
Juan Lara (Chile)
Support video assistant referee:
Tatiana Guzmán (Nicaragua)

== Match for third place ==
France and England had faced each other in 32 previous matches since 1923, with three of those encounters taking place at the World Cup. The first two meetings took place at the group stage and were won by England: 2–0 as host in 1966 and 3–1 in 1982. Their third tournament match (which was also their most recent meeting in any type of competition) took place in the quarterfinals of the last World Cup, when France won 2–1. This was France's first appearance in such match since 1986. As both were European teams, this was already set pre-match as the twelfth consecutive World Cup in which European teams finished third, stretching back to 1982, when Poland defeated France.

England manager Thomas Tuchel made seven changes to his starting lineup that lost to Argentina in the semifinal, and he was booed by some England fans before kickoff amid criticism of his tactics.

England stormed to a four goal lead by halftime via an early long-range strike by Declan Rice, a header by Ezri Konsa, and a double by Bukayo Saka. This marked the first time France had trailed by four goals at half-time of any international match since April 1930.

France made four changes at halftime, and by the hydration break in the second half, England's lead was cut to just a single goal, with Kylian Mbappé scoring twice (and ending up winning his second consecutive FIFA World Cup Golden Boot), and Bradley Barcola striking from inside the penalty box. Michael Olise almost restored parity for France, but his strike went wide. Djed Spence was then fouled in the France penalty box, resulting in a penalty to England, which was converted by Saka. Deep into injury time, Ousmane Dembélé charged into the penalty box and scored France's final goal of the match. Moments later, with full time imminent, Jude Bellingham made a solo run to France's penalty box and netted England's sixth goal.

Saka became just the second England player in history to score a hat trick in a World Cup knockout match, after Geoff Hurst in the 1966 final, and the fourth Englishman overall after Gary Lineker in 1986 and Harry Kane in 2018. The only other player to score a hat trick against France in the World Cup is Pelé for Brazil in 1958.

Jude Bellingham's seven goals over the tournament is the highest ever goal tally by an England player at a World Cup or UEFA European Championship tournament. Declan Rice's opening goal was England's second earliest goal in a World Cup match behind only Bryan Robson, who scored after 28 seconds (also against France) in 1982, which was also the last time England ever defeated France in a major tournament.

This was the first World Cup match in which France conceded six goals, and the first time conceding six goals in any international match since 1960, where they lost 2–6 to Switzerland in a friendly game.

England's victory secured its best World Cup finish since winning the competition in 1966 (after previous attempts in 1990 and 2018), and was only its second victory in the World Cup against a higher-ranked opponent in the FIFA Rankings, previously defeating Argentina 1–0 in 2002.

This was the highest-scoring match of the tournament, with a total of ten goals, as well as the highest-scoring World Cup bronze final of all time, eclipsing France's 6–3 win in over West Germany in 1958. It featured the joint fifth–most goals of any World Cup match, level with France's 7–3 win over Paraguay in 1958, and the most of any game in the tournament since Hungary beat El Salvador 10–1 at the 1982 FIFA World Cup. It was also the third-highest-scoring knockout-stage game at any World Cup, beaten only by Brazil's 6–5 extra-time win over Poland in 1938 and Austria beating Switzerland 7–5 in 1954.

July 18, 2026
5:00 p.m. UTC−4

France	4–6	England
Mbappé 48', 66'; Barcola 54'; Dembélé 90+6'	(Note: "France vs England | Bronze final | FIFA World Cup 2026". FIFA. Retrieved July 15, 2026.; "Match Report – Bronze final – France v. England". FIFA. July 18, 2026. Retrieved July 18, 2026.; "Post match summary report – Bronze final – France v. England". FIFA. July 18, 2026. Retrieved July 19, 2026.)	Rice 3'; Konsa 18'; Saka 37', 45+1', 87' (pen.); Bellingham 90+8'

Hard Rock Stadium, Miami Gardens
Attendance: 64,478
Referee: Jesús Valenzuela (Venezuela)

France	England

GK	16	Mike Maignan
RB	2	Malo Gusto	(substituted off) 90+1'
CB	15	Ibrahima Konaté	(substituted off) 46'
CB	26	Maxence Lacroix
LB	19	Théo Hernandez	(substituted off) 46'
CM	18	Warren Zaïre-Emery
CM	14	Adrien Rabiot
RW	11	Michael Olise
AM	24	Rayan Cherki	(substituted off) 46'
LW	20	Désiré Doué	(substituted off) 46'
CF	10	Kylian Mbappé (c)
Substitutions:
DF	3	Lucas Digne	(substituted on) 46'
DF	4	Dayot Upamecano	(substituted on) 46'
FW	7	Ousmane Dembélé	(substituted on) 46'
FW	12	Bradley Barcola	(substituted on) 46'
DF	5	Jules Koundé	(substituted on) 90+1'
Manager:
Didier Deschamps

GK	13	Dean Henderson
RB	26	Jarell Quansah	(substituted off) 83'
CB	2	Ezri Konsa
CB	6	Marc Guéhi	(substituted off) 90+2'
LB	25	Djed Spence
DM	4	Declan Rice (c)
CM	17	Morgan Rogers
CM	21	Eberechi Eze	(substituted off) 79'
RF	7	Bukayo Saka
CF	22	Ivan Toney	(substituted off) 79'
LF	11	Marcus Rashford	(substituted off) 46'
Substitutions:
FW	19	Ollie Watkins	(substituted on) 46'
MF	8	Elliot Anderson	(substituted on) 79'
MF	10	Jude Bellingham	(substituted on) 79'
DF	24	Reece James	(substituted on) 83'
DF	12	Trevoh Chalobah	(substituted on) 90+2'
Manager:
(Germany) Thomas Tuchel

Man of the Match:
Bukayo Saka (England)

Assistant referees:
Jorge Urrego (Venezuela)
Tulio Moreno (Venezuela)
Fourth official:
Jalal Jayed (Morocco)
Reserve assistant referee:
Zakaria Brinsi (Morocco)
Video assistant referee:
Leodán González (Uruguay)
Assistant video assistant referee:
Armando Villarreal (United States)
Support video assistant referee:
Carlos del Cerro Grande (Spain)

== Final ==
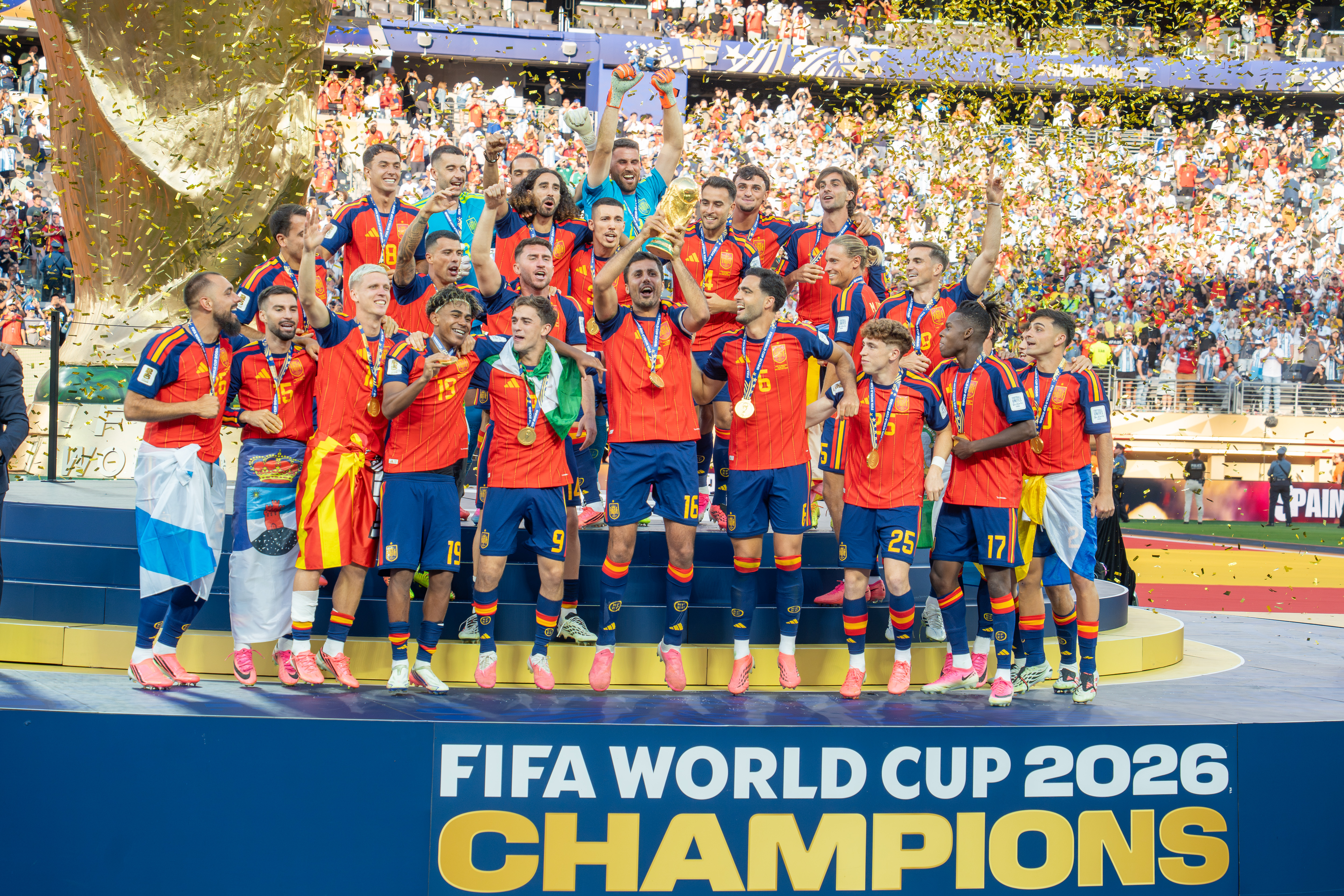
Spain lifting the FIFA World Cup Trophy

Spain and Argentina had faced each other in 14 previous matches since 1952, with an even record as both teams won six matches along with two draws. They only met once at the World Cup, when Argentina won 2–1 in the group stage of the 1966 tournament. Their latest meeting took place in 2018, a 6–1 win for Spain in a friendly. They were expected to meet at the 2026 Finalissima on March 27 at Lusail Stadium in Lusail, Qatar. However, the match was cancelled as a result of the ongoing Iran war and the inability to reach an agreement to move the match to another location.

Spain's victory made it the second European nation to win a World Cup held in the Americas following Germany in 2014, the second nation to win a World Cup co-hosted by multiple countries after Brazil in 2002 (held in South Korea and Japan), and the first ever to do so in North America, where the previous tournament in 1994 (also in the United States) was won by Brazil.

On July 29, ten days after the final, FIFA opened disciplinary proceedings against the Argentine Football Association (AFA) and its players following several tournament incidents. These included post-match altercations with Spanish players after the final, as well as a potential breach of regulations regarding non-sporting demonstrations. The latter charge stemmed from an incident four days prior to the final, following Argentina's 2–1 semifinal victory over England, when players displayed a banner reading "Las Malvinas son Argentinas" ("The Falklands are Argentine") in reference to the territorial dispute between Argentina and the United Kingdom.

July 19, 2026
3:00 p.m. UTC−4

Spain	1–0 (a.e.t.)	Argentina
Torres 106'	(Note: "Spain vs Argentina | Final | FIFA World Cup 2026". FIFA. Retrieved July 19, 2026.; "Match Report – Final – Spain v. Argentina". FIFA. July 19, 2026. Retrieved July 19, 2026.; "Post match summary report – Final – Spain v. Argentina". FIFA. July 20, 2026. Retrieved July 20, 2026.)

MetLife Stadium, East Rutherford
Attendance: 80,663
Referee: Slavko Vinčić (Slovenia)

Spain	Argentina

GK	23	Unai Simón
RB	12	Pedro Porro
CB	22	Pau Cubarsí
CB	14	Aymeric Laporte	(substituted off) 99'
LB	24	Marc Cucurella
DM	16	Rodri (c)	(substituted off) 99'
CM	10	Dani Olmo	(substituted off) 75'
CM	8	Fabián Ruiz	(substituted off) 62'
RF	19	Lamine Yamal
CF	21	Mikel Oyarzabal	(substituted off) 62'
LF	15	Álex Baena	(substituted off) 75'
Substitutions:
FW	7	Ferran Torres	(substituted on) 62'
MF	20	Pedri	(substituted on) 62'
MF	6	Mikel Merino	(substituted on) 75'
FW	17	Nico Williams	(substituted on) 75'
MF	18	Martín Zubimendi	(substituted on) 99'
DF	4	Eric Garcia	(substituted on) 99'
Manager:
Luis de la Fuente

GK	23	Emiliano Martínez
RB	4	Gonzalo Montiel		(substituted off) 58'
CB	13	Cristian Romero	(yellow card) 90+2'	(substituted off) 70'
CB	6	Lisandro Martínez	(yellow card) 41'	(substituted off) 44'
LB	3	Nicolás Tagliafico
RM	7	Rodrigo De Paul		(substituted off) 70'
CM	24	Enzo Fernández	(yellow card) 82' (yellow-red card) 90+3'
CM	20	Alexis Mac Allister	(yellow card) 111'
LM	15	Nicolás González		(substituted off) 46'
CF	10	Lionel Messi (c)
CF	9	Julián Alvarez		(substituted off) 102'
Substitutions:
DF	19	Nicolás Otamendi		(substituted on) 44'
MF	5	Leandro Paredes	(yellow card) 52'	(substituted on) 46'
DF	26	Nahuel Molina		(substituted on) 58'
DF	25	Facundo Medina		(substituted on) 70'
FW	17	Giuliano Simeone		(substituted on) 70'
DF	2	Marcos Senesi		(substituted on) 102'
Manager:
Lionel Scaloni			(yellow card) 105'

Man of the Match:
Ferran Torres (Spain)

Assistant referees:
Tomaž Klančnik (Slovenia)
Andraž Kovačič (Slovenia)
Fourth official:
Adham Makhadmeh (Jordan)
Reserve assistant referee:
Mohammad Al-Kalaf (Jordan)
Video assistant referee:
Bastian Dankert (Germany)
Assistant video assistant referee:
Nicolás Gallo (Colombia)
Support video assistant referee:
Khamis Al-Marri (Qatar)
