= 2026 FIFA World Cup officials =

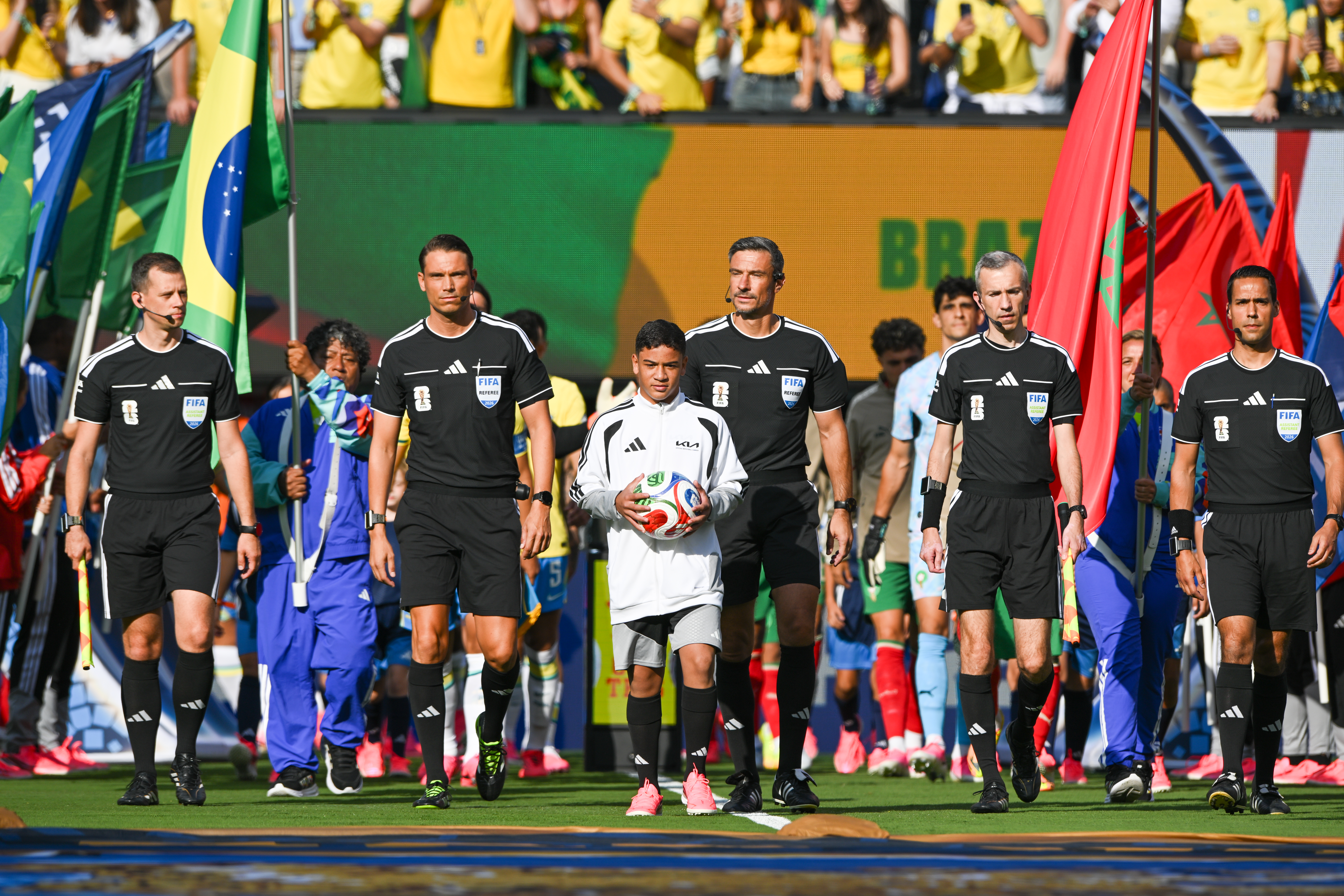
Match officials walking out prior to the match between Brazil and Morocco on June 13, 2026. Left to right: Andraž Kovačič (Assistant Referee), Sandro Schärer (Fourth Official), Slavko Vinčić (Referee), Tomaž Klančnik (Assistant Referee), Stéphane De Almeida (Reserve Assistant Referee)

The following is a list of match officials (referees, assistant referees, and video assistant referees) who officiated at the 2026 FIFA World Cup in Canada, Mexico, and the United States. The list also includes the appointments received by each match official.

== Referees and assistant referees ==
On April 9, 2026, FIFA announced the list of 52 referees, 88 assistant referees, and 30 video assistant referees for the tournament. The 2026 tournament featured six female match officials, matching the record for the highest number of female officials appointed to a men's World Cup.

Tori Penso (United States) and Katia Itzel García (Mexico) were selected as referees, making them the first female on-field referees from their respective nations to officiate a men's World Cup tournament. They were joined by assistant referees Brooke Mayo (United States), Kathryn Nesbitt (United States), and Sandra Ramírez (Mexico), as well as Tatiana Guzmán (Nicaragua), who served as a video assistant referee. On June 18, 2026, Penso, Mayo, and Nesbitt became the second all-female on-field refereeing trio at a men's World Cup, taking charge of the Group A match between the Czech Republic and South Africa at Atlanta Stadium.

Additionally, Omar Artan from Somalia was originally selected to officiate at the tournament. However, he was removed from the list after being refused entry to the United States at Miami International Airport. Despite holding valid travel documentation (a diplomatic passport and a US visa), he was declared inadmissible due to "vetting concerns" and alleged "association with suspected members of terror organizations". Artan strongly denied any links to terror groups. Upon his return to Somalia, it was announced that Artan would receive his full World Cup salary despite not being able to officiate in the tournament.

On July 16, 2026, FIFA announced that Slovenian referee Slavko Vinčić would adjudicate the final.

Confederation	Referees	Assistant referees	Matches assigned	Fourth official
AFC	Omar Al Ali (United Arab Emirates)	Mohamed Al-Hammadi (United Arab Emirates)	New Zealand–Egypt (Group G)	Turkey–United States (Group D); South Africa–Canada (Round of 32)
AFC	Abdulrahman Al-Jassim (Qatar)	Taleb Al-Marri (Qatar); Saud Al-Maqaleh (Qatar)	Portugal–DR Congo (Group K); Panama–England (Group L)	Paraguay–France (Round of 16)
AFC	Khalid Al-Turais (Saudi Arabia)	Mohammed Al-Bakry (Saudi Arabia)		Canada–Bosnia and Herzegovina (Group B); Ivory Coast–Ecuador (Group E); Ghana–Panama (Group L); Germany–Ivory Coast (Group E); Panama–Croatia (Group L); Senegal–Iraq (Group I); England–DR Congo (Round of 32)
AFC	Alireza Faghani (Australia)	George Lakrindis (Australia); James Lindsay (Australia)	France–Senegal (Group I); Colombia–Portugal (Group K); Mexico–England (Round of 16)	
AFC	Ma Ning (China)	Zhou Fei (China)	Ecuador–Curaçao (Group E)	England–Ghana (Group L); Norway–France (Group I); Germany–Paraguay (Round of 32)
AFC	Adham Makhadmeh (Jordan)	Mohammad Al-Kalaf (Jordan); Ahmad Al-Roalle (Jordan)	Spain–Cape Verde (Group H); New Zealand–Belgium (Group G); England–DR Congo (Round of 32); United States–Belgium (Round of 16)	Scotland–Morocco (Group C); Spain–Argentina (Final)
AFC	Ilgiz Tantashev (Uzbekistan)	Timur Gaynullin (Uzbekistan); Andrey Tsapenko (Uzbekistan)	Scotland–Morocco (Group C); Algeria–Austria (Group J); Paraguay–France (Round of 16)	
AFC	Yusuke Araki (Japan)	Jun Mihara (Japan)		United States–Paraguay (Group D); Iran–New Zealand (Group G); Switzerland–Bosnia and Herzegovina (Group B); Belgium–Iran (Group G); Bosnia and Herzegovina–Qatar (Group B); Egypt–Iran (Group G)
CAF	Pierre Atcho (Gabon)	Boris Ditsoga (Gabon); Amos Abeigne Ndong (Gabon)	Iraq–Norway (Group I); Panama–Croatia (Group L)	United States–Belgium (Round of 16)
CAF	Dahane Beida (Mauritania)	Jerson Emiliano dos Santos (Angola); Elvis Noupue (Cameroon)	Austria–Jordan (Group J)	Japan–Sweden (Group F); Jordan–Argentina (Group J); Spain–Austria (Round of 32)
CAF	Mustapha Ghorbal (Algeria)	Mokrane Gourari (Algeria); Abbes Akram Zerhouni (Algeria)	Haiti–Scotland (Group C); Turkey–United States (Group D)	Mexico–Ecuador (Round of 32)
CAF	Jalal Jayed (Morocco)	Zakaria Brinsi (Morocco); Mostafa Akarkad (Morocco)	Germany–Curaçao (Group E); Portugal–Uzbekistan (Group K); Germany–Paraguay (Round of 32)	Mexico–England (Round of 16); France–England (Match for third place)
CAF	Amin Omar (Egypt)	Mahmoud Abouregal (Egypt); Ahmed Hossam Taha (Egypt)	South Korea–Czech Republic (Group A); Argentina–Austria (Group J)	Iraq–Norway (Group I)
CAF	Abongile Tom (South Africa)	Zakhele Siwela (South Africa)		Germany–Curaçao (Group E); Portugal–DR Congo (Group K); Netherlands–Sweden (Group F); Portugal–Uzbekistan (Group K); Cape Verde–Saudi Arabia (Group H); Portugal–Croatia (Round of 32)
CONCACAF	Iván Barton (El Salvador)	David Morán (El Salvador); Henry Pupiro (Nicaragua)	Turkey–Paraguay (Group D); Japan–Sweden (Group F); Switzerland–Colombia (Round of 16); France–Spain (Semifinals)	
CONCACAF	Juan Gabriel Calderón (Costa Rica)	Juan Carlos Mora (Costa Rica)		South Korea–Czech Republic (Group A); Sweden–Tunisia (Group F); Uzbekistan–Colombia (Group K); Tunisia–Japan (Group F); Colombia–DR Congo (Group K); Uruguay–Spain (Group H)
CONCACAF	Ismail Elfath (United States)	Corey Parker (United States); Kyle Atkins (United States)	Netherlands–Japan (Group F); Uruguay–Spain (Group H); Brazil–Norway (Round of 16); England–Argentina (Semifinals)	
CONCACAF	Oshane Nation (Jamaica)	Caleb Wales (Trinidad and Tobago)		Qatar–Switzerland (Group B); Austria–Jordan (Group J); Turkey–Paraguay (Group D); Jordan–Algeria (Group J); Paraguay–Australia (Group D)
CONCACAF	Drew Fischer (Canada)	Lyes Arfa (Canada); Micheal Barwegen (Canada)	France–Iraq (Group I); Croatia–Ghana (Group L); Argentina–Cape Verde (Round of 32)	Saudi Arabia–Uruguay (Group H); Argentina–Switzerland (Quarterfinals)
CONCACAF	Katia Itzel García (Mexico)	Sandra Ramírez (Mexico)	Tunisia–Netherlands (Group F)	Netherlands–Japan (Group F); England–Croatia (Group L); United States–Australia (Group D); Algeria–Austria (Group J); Argentina–Cape Verde (Round of 32); Switzerland–Colombia (Round of 16)
CONCACAF	Saíd Martínez (Honduras)	Walter López (Honduras); Christian Ramírez (Honduras)	Qatar–Switzerland (Group B); England–Ghana (Group L); Belgium–Senegal (Round of 32)	Colombia–Portugal (Group K); Brazil–Norway (Round of 16)
CONCACAF	Tori Penso (United States)	Kathryn Nesbitt (United States); Brooke Mayo (United States)	Czech Republic–South Africa (Group A); Ecuador–Germany (Group E)	Uruguay–Cape Verde (Group H); France–Sweden (Round of 32)
CONCACAF	César Arturo Ramos (Mexico)	Alberto Morín (Mexico); Marco Bisguerra (Mexico)	Iran–New Zealand (Group G); Scotland–Brazil (Group C)	
CONMEBOL	Ramon Abatti (Brazil)	Rafael Alves (Brazil); Danilo Manis (Brazil)	Belgium–Egypt (Group G); Switzerland–Canada (Group B)	Spain–Belgium (Quarterfinals)
CONMEBOL	Juan Gabriel Benítez (Paraguay)	Eduardo Cardozo (Paraguay); Milcíades Saldívar (Paraguay)	Germany–Ivory Coast (Group E)	Mexico–South Africa (Group A); Tunisia–Netherlands (Group F); Ivory Coast–Norway (Round of 32)
CONMEBOL	Raphael Claus (Brazil)	Rodrigo Figueiredo (Brazil)	Spain–Saudi Arabia (Group H); United States–Bosnia and Herzegovina (Round of 32)	
CONMEBOL	Yael Falcón (Argentina)	Maximiliano Del Yesso (Argentina); Facundo Rodríguez (Argentina)	Sweden–Tunisia (Group F); Czech Republic–Mexico (Group A); Switzerland–Algeria (Round of 32)	
CONMEBOL	Cristián Garay (Chile)	José Retamal (Chile); Miguel Rocha (Chile)	Canada–Qatar (Group B)	Czech Republic–Mexico (Group A); Netherlands–Morocco (Round of 32)
CONMEBOL	Darío Herrera (Argentina)	Cristian Navarro (Argentina)	Belgium–Iran (Group G)	United States–Bosnia and Herzegovina (Round of 32); France–Morocco (Quarterfinals)
CONMEBOL	Kevin Ortega (Peru)	Michael Orué (Peru)		Australia–Turkey (Group D); Belgium–Egypt (Group G); Canada–Qatar (Group B); New Zealand–Egypt (Group G); Switzerland–Canada (Group B); New Zealand–Belgium (Group G); Switzerland–Algeria (Round of 32)
CONMEBOL	Andrés Rojas (Colombia)	Alexander Guzmán (Colombia)		Spain–Cape Verde (Group H); Mexico–South Korea (Group A); Spain–Saudi Arabia (Group H); South Africa–South Korea (Group A); Belgium–Senegal (Round of 32)
CONMEBOL	Wilton Sampaio (Brazil)	Bruno Boschilia (Brazil); Bruno Pires (Brazil)	Mexico–South Africa (Group A); Norway–Senegal (Group I); Netherlands–Morocco (Round of 32)	
CONMEBOL	Gustavo Tejera (Uruguay)	Nicolás Tarán (Uruguay); Carlos Barreiro (Uruguay)	Mexico–South Korea (Group A); Australia–Egypt (Round of 32)	
CONMEBOL	Facundo Tello (Argentina)	Juan Pablo Belatti (Argentina); Gabriel Chade (Argentina)	Canada–Bosnia and Herzegovina (Group B); South Africa–South Korea (Group A); France–Morocco (Quarterfinals)	
CONMEBOL	Jesús Valenzuela (Venezuela)	Jorge Urrego (Venezuela); Tulio Moreno (Venezuela)	Australia–Turkey (Group D); Bosnia and Herzegovina–Qatar (Group B); Ivory Coast–Norway (Round of 32); France–England (Match for third place)	
OFC	Campbell-Kirk Kawana-Waugh (New Zealand)	Isaac Trevis (New Zealand)		Argentina–Algeria (Group J); Czech Republic–South Africa (Group A); Ecuador–Curaçao (Group E); Norway–Senegal (Group I); Ecuador–Germany (Group E); Croatia–Ghana (Group L)
UEFA	Espen Eskås (Norway)	Jan Erik Engan (Norway); Isaak Bashevkin (Norway)	Uruguay–Cape Verde (Group H); Portugal–Croatia (Round of 32)	Scotland–Brazil (Group C); Argentina–Egypt (Round of 16)
UEFA	Alejandro Hernández Hernández (Spain)	José Enrique Naranjo Pérez (Spain); Diego Sánchez Rojo (Spain)	Brazil–Haiti (Group C)	Haiti–Scotland (Group C); Argentina–Austria (Group J); DR Congo–Uzbekistan (Group K); Colombia–Ghana (Round of 32); Norway–England (Quarterfinals)
UEFA	István Kovács (Romania)	Mihai Marius Marica (Romania); Ferencz Tunyogi (Romania)	Tunisia–Japan (Group F); Jordan–Argentina (Group J)	
UEFA	François Letexier (France)	Cyril Mugnier (France); Mehdi Rahmouni (France)	Ivory Coast–Ecuador (Group E); Cape Verde–Saudi Arabia (Group H); Argentina–Egypt (Round of 16)	
UEFA	Danny Makkelie (Netherlands)	Hessel Steegstra (Netherlands); Jan de Vries (Netherlands)	United States–Paraguay (Group D); Morocco–Haiti (Group C); France–Sweden (Round of 32)	Canada–Morocco (Round of 16)
UEFA	Szymon Marciniak (Poland)	Tomasz Listkiewicz (Poland); Adam Kupsik (Poland)	Argentina–Algeria (Group J); Egypt–Iran (Group G)	
UEFA	Maurizio Mariani (Italy)	Daniele Bindoni (Italy); Alberto Tegoni (Italy)	Saudi Arabia–Uruguay (Group H); Colombia–DR Congo (Group K); Brazil–Japan (Round of 32)	England–Argentina (Semifinals)
UEFA	Glenn Nyberg (Sweden)	Mahbod Beigi (Sweden); Andreas Söderkvist (Sweden)	Ghana–Panama (Group L); Curaçao–Ivory Coast (Group E); Spain–Austria (Round of 32)	France–Spain (Semifinals)
UEFA	Michael Oliver (England)	Stuart Burt (England); James Mainwaring (England)	Netherlands–Sweden (Group F) (Note: Michael Oliver was originally appointed to the Ivory Coast vs Ecuador match but he pulled out due to a minor injury.); Norway–France (Group I); Canada–Morocco (Round of 16); Spain–Belgium (Quarterfinals)	
UEFA	João Pinheiro (Portugal)	Bruno Jesus (Portugal); Luciano Maia (Portugal)	Switzerland–Bosnia and Herzegovina (Group B); South Africa–Canada (Round of 32); Argentina–Switzerland (Quarterfinals)	Morocco–Haiti (Group C)
UEFA	Sandro Schärer (Switzerland)	Stéphane De Almeida (Switzerland)		Brazil–Morocco (Group C); France–Senegal (Group I); Brazil–Haiti (Group C); France–Iraq (Group I); Curaçao–Ivory Coast (Group E); Panama–England (Group L); Brazil–Japan (Round of 32); Australia–Egypt (Round of 32)
UEFA	Anthony Taylor (England)	Gary Beswick (England); Adam Nunn (England)	Uzbekistan–Colombia (Group K); Senegal–Iraq (Group I); Portugal–Spain (Round of 16)	
UEFA	Clément Turpin (France)	Nicolas Danos (France); Benjamin Pagès (France)	England–Croatia (Group L); Paraguay–Australia (Group D); Colombia–Ghana (Round of 32); Norway–England (Quarterfinals)	
UEFA	Slavko Vinčić (Slovenia)	Tomaž Klančnik (Slovenia); Andraž Kovačič (Slovenia)	Brazil–Morocco (Group C); Jordan–Algeria (Group J); Mexico–Ecuador (Round of 32); Spain–Argentina (Final)	
UEFA	Felix Zwayer (Germany)	Robert Kempter (Germany); Christian Dietz (Germany)	United States–Australia (Group D); DR Congo–Uzbekistan (Group K)	Portugal–Spain (Round of 16)

== Video assistant referees ==
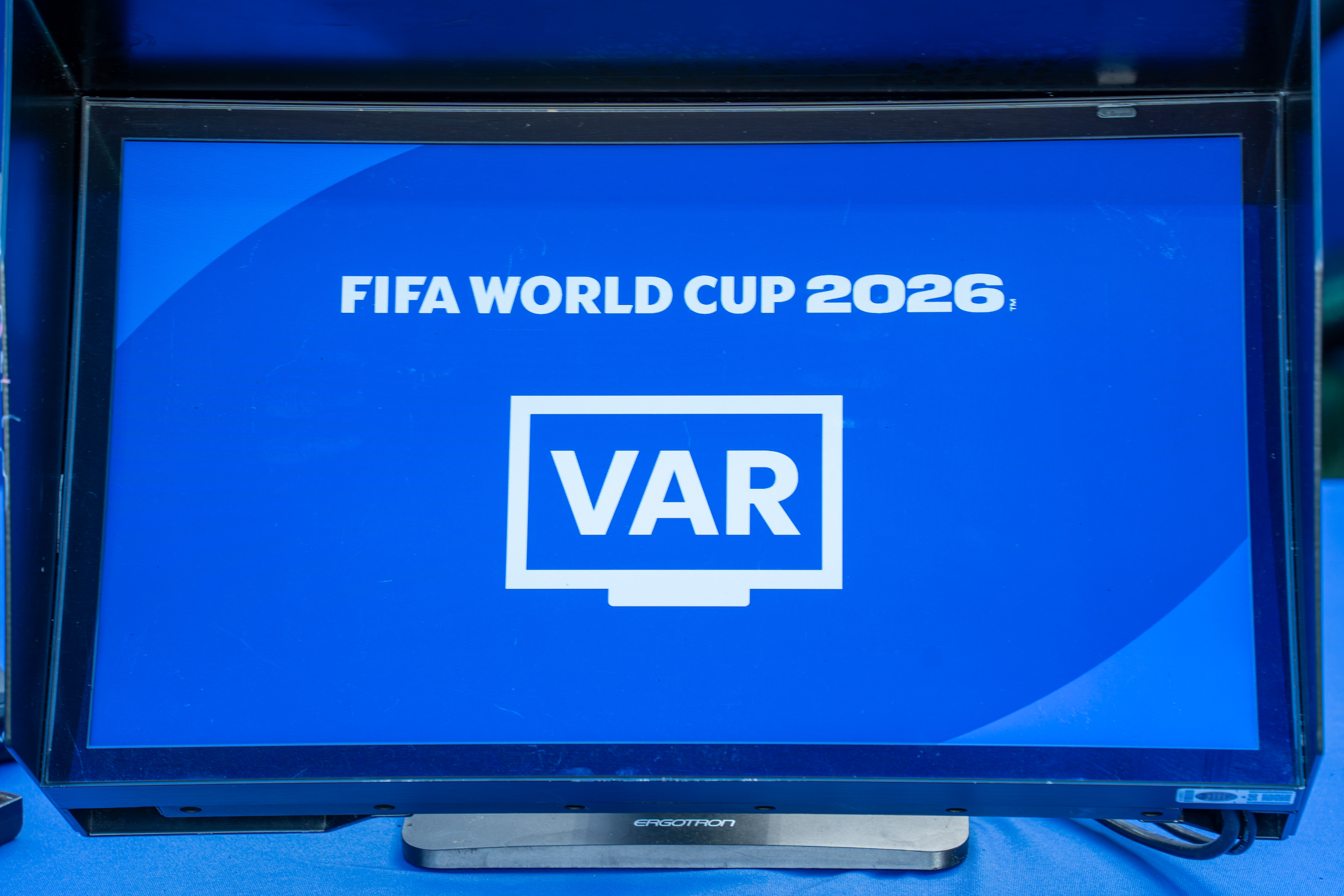
VAR at the 2026 FIFA World Cup

On May 7, 2026, Willy Delajod was chosen as a last-minute addition to the video match official team. On May 15, Delajod's additional was confirmed as a replacement of Dutch VAR Rob Dieperink, who was abruptly dropped by FIFA following his arrest in England.

Confederation	Video assistant referee
AFC	Khamis Al-Marri (Qatar)
AFC	Abdullah Al-Shehri (Saudi Arabia)
AFC	Shaun Evans (Australia)
AFC	Fu Ming (China)
AFC	Mohammed Obaid Khadim (United Arab Emirates)
CAF	Mahmoud Ashour (Egypt)
CAF	Hamza El Fariq (Morocco)
CONCACAF	Joe Dickerson (United States)
CONCACAF	Armando Villarreal (United States)
CONCACAF	Erick Miranda (Mexico)
CONCACAF	Tatiana Guzmán (Nicaragua)
CONMEBOL	Juan Lara (Chile)
CONMEBOL	Hernán Mastrángelo (Argentina)
CONMEBOL	Antonio García (Uruguay)
CONMEBOL	Leodán González (Uruguay)
CONMEBOL	Juan Soto (Venezuela)
CONMEBOL	Nicolás Gallo (Colombia)
CONMEBOL	Rodolpho Toski (Brazil)
CONMEBOL	Guillermo Pacheco (Mexico)
UEFA	Jérôme Brisard (France)
UEFA	Willy Delajod (France)
UEFA	Bastian Dankert (Germany)
UEFA	Carlos del Cerro Grande (Spain)
UEFA	Marco Di Bello (Italy)
UEFA	Ivan Bebek (Croatia)
UEFA	Jarred Gillett (England)
UEFA	Dennis Higler (Netherlands)
UEFA	Tomasz Kwiatkowski (Poland)
UEFA	Bram Van Driessche (Belgium)
UEFA	Fedayi San (Switzerland)
