= 2026 FIFA World Cup Group G =

FIFA World Cup group

Group G of the 2026 FIFA World Cup took place from June 15 to 26, 2026. The group consisted of Belgium, Egypt, Iran, and New Zealand. All of the matches in Group G were played at three venues on the West Coast of the United States and Canada: SoFi Stadium in the Greater Los Angeles area; Lumen Field in Seattle; and BC Place in Vancouver.

Belgium topped the group with a crucial win against New Zealand (by five goals to one), with Egypt finishing as group runners-up based on goal difference. Both teams advanced to the round of 32.

Iran finished in third place, and were eliminated as they were out-performed by other teams in third place within their groups, failing to finish as one of the eight best third-place teams. New Zealand finished fourth after a decisive defeat against Belgium, and were also eliminated.

== Teams ==
Draw position	Team	Pot	Confederation	Method of qualification	Date of qualification	Finals appearance	Last appearance	Previous best performance	FIFA Rankings	
Draw position	Team	Pot	Confederation	Method of qualification	Date of qualification	Finals appearance	Last appearance	Previous best performance	November 2025 (Note: The rankings of November 2025 were used for seeding for the final draw.)	June 2026
G1	Belgium	1	UEFA	UEFA Group J winner	November 18, 2025	15th	2022	Third place (2018)	8	9
G2	Egypt	3	CAF	CAF Group A winner	October 8, 2025	4th	2018	First round (1934), group stage (1990, 2018)	34	29
G3	Iran	2	AFC	AFC third round Group A winner	March 25, 2025	7th	2022	Group stage (1978, 1998, 2006, 2014, 2018, 2022)	20	20
G4	New Zealand	4	OFC	OFC third round winner	March 24, 2025	3rd	2010	Group stage (1982, 2010)	86	85

== Standings ==
Pos	Team	Pld	W	D	L	GF	GA	GD	Pts	Qualification
1	Belgium	3	1	2	0	6	2	+4	5 (Note: Tied on head-to-head result (Belgium 1–1 Egypt). Overall goal difference was used as the tiebreaker.)	Advance to knockout stage
2	Egypt	3	1	2	0	5	3	+2	5	Advance to knockout stage
3	Iran	3	0	3	0	3	3	0	3	
4	New Zealand	3	0	1	2	4	10	−6	1	

Source: FIFA
Rules for classification: Group stage tiebreakers
Notes:

In the round of 32:

- The winner of Group G, Belgium, advanced to play the third-place team of Group I, Senegal.
- The runner-up of Group G, Egypt, advanced to play the runner-up of Group D, Australia.

== Matches ==
All times listed are local, UTC−7 (PDT).

=== Belgium vs Egypt ===
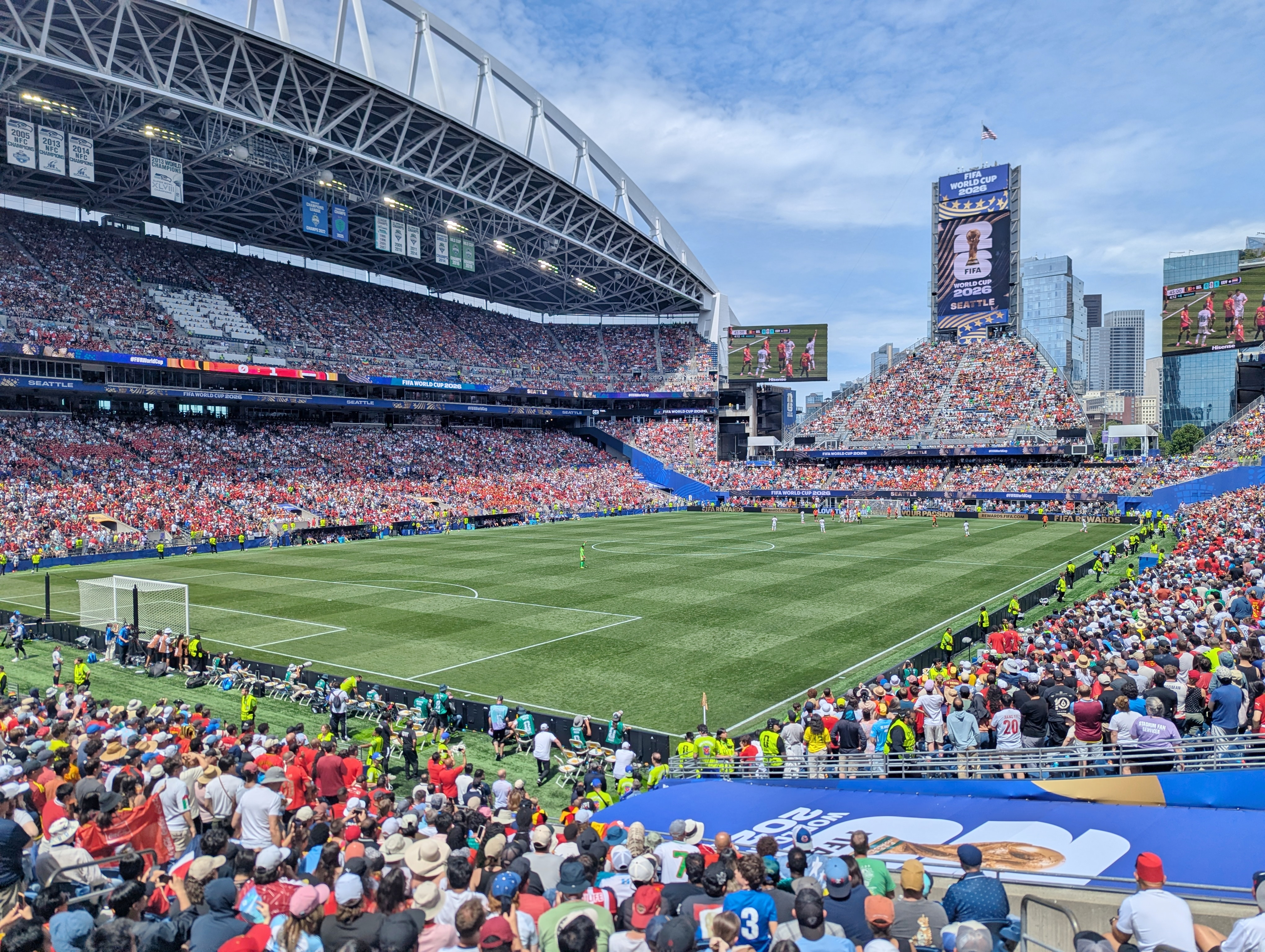
Lumen Field in Seattle during the Group G match between Belgium and Egypt

The teams had previously faced each other four times, most recently in 2022, a 2–1 win for Egypt in a friendly.

Egypt took an early lead, but a costly own goal by Mohamed Hany allowed Belgium to equalize and secure a 1–1 draw, despite having previously struggled to break through the formidable Egyptian defense.

June 15, 2026
12:00 p.m.

Belgium	1–1	Egypt
Hany 66' (o.g.)	(Note: "Belgium vs Egypt | First Stage | FIFA World Cup 2026". FIFA. Retrieved June 15, 2026.; "Match Report – Group G – Belgium v. Egypt". FIFA. Retrieved June 15, 2026.; "Post match summary report – Group G – Belgium v. Egypt". FIFA. June 15, 2026. Retrieved June 17, 2026.)	Ashour 19'

Lumen Field, Seattle
Attendance: 66,775
Referee: Ramon Abatti (Brazil)

Belgium	Egypt

GK	1	Thibaut Courtois
RB	15	Thomas Meunier
CB	25	Nathan Ngoy
CB	4	Brandon Mechele
LB	21	Timothy Castagne	(yellow card) 14'	(substituted off) 56'
CM	24	Amadou Onana		(substituted off) 56'
CM	8	Youri Tielemans (c)
RW	10	Leandro Trossard
AM	7	Kevin De Bruyne		(substituted off) 86'
LW	11	Jérémy Doku		(substituted off) 86'
CF	17	Charles De Ketelaere		(substituted off) 66'
Substitutions:
MF	23	Nicolas Raskin		(substituted on) 56'
DF	5	Maxim De Cuyper	(yellow card) 75'	(substituted on) 56'
FW	9	Romelu Lukaku		(substituted on) 66'
MF	20	Hans Vanaken		(substituted on) 86'
FW	26	Matias Fernandez-Pardo		(substituted on) 86'
Manager:
(France) Rudi Garcia

GK	23	Mostafa Shobeir
RB	3	Mohamed Hany
CB	2	Yasser Ibrahim
CB	14	Hamdy Fathy		(substituted off) 88'
LB	13	Ahmed Fatouh	(yellow card) 34'	(substituted off) 88'
CM	19	Marwan Attia	(yellow card) 13'
CM	17	Mohanad Lasheen
RW	11	Mostafa Ziko		(substituted off) 76'
AM	10	Mohamed Salah (c)		(substituted off) 76'
LW	8	Emam Ashour		(substituted off) 71'
CF	22	Omar Marmoush
Substitutions:
DF	5	Ramy Rabia		(substituted on) 71'
FW	9	Hamza Abdelkarim		(substituted on) 76'
FW	25	Zizo		(substituted on) 76'
FW	20	Ibrahim Adel		(substituted on) 88'
DF	15	Karim Hafez		(substituted on) 88'
Manager:
Hossam Hassan

Man of the Match:
Emam Ashour (Egypt)

Assistant referees:
Danilo Manis (Brazil)
Rafael Alves (Brazil)
Fourth official:
Kevin Ortega (Peru)
Reserve assistant referee:
Michael Orué (Peru)
Video assistant referee:
Juan Soto (Venezuela)
Assistant video assistant referee:
Leodán González (Uruguay)
Support video assistant referee:
Carlos del Cerro Grande (Spain)

=== Iran vs New Zealand ===
The two teams have faced each other twice, most recently in the 2003 AFC–OFC Challenge Cup, which Iran won by 3–0.

Elijah Just earned his team's lead by making two consecutive goals, but throughout the second half, Mohammad Mohebi leveled the Iranian team in the 64th minute as New Zealand struggled to break through the tie. Ultimately, the match ended with a 2–2 draw.

This marked New Zealand having their fourth draw since their last appearance in 2010, marred by their inconsistencies throughout the match. Ramin Rezaeian was chosen as Man of the Match for the Iranian team.

June 15, 2026
6:00 p.m.

Iran	2–2	New Zealand
Rezaeian 32'; Mohebi 64'	(Note: "IR Iran vs New Zealand | First Stage | FIFA World Cup 2026". FIFA. Retrieved June 15, 2026.; "Match Report – Group G – IR Iran v. New Zealand". FIFA. June 15, 2026. Retrieved June 16, 2026.; "Post match summary report – Group G – IR Iran v. New Zealand". FIFA. June 15, 2026. Retrieved June 16, 2026.)	Just 7', 54'

SoFi Stadium, Inglewood
Attendance: 70,108
Referee: César Arturo Ramos (Mexico)

Iran	New Zealand

GK	1	Alireza Beiranvand
RB	23	Ramin Rezaeian
CB	4	Shojae Khalilzadeh
CB	19	Ali Nemati
LB	5	Milad Mohammadi
CM	14	Saman Ghoddos		(substituted off) 65'
CM	6	Saeid Ezatolahi
CM	9	Mehdi Taremi (c)		(substituted off) 80'
RF	8	Mohammad Mohebi
CF	20	Shahriyar Moghanlou		(substituted off) 53'
LF	17	Arya Yousefi		(substituted off) 45'
Substitutions:
FW	10	Mehdi Ghayedi		(substituted on) 45'
FW	11	Ali Alipour		(substituted on) 53'
DF	3	Ehsan Hajsafi	(yellow card) 89'	(substituted on) 65'
FW	18	Amirhossein Hosseinzadeh		(substituted on) 80'
Manager:
Amir Ghalenoei

GK	1	Max Crocombe
RB	2	Tim Payne	(substituted off) 78'
CB	16	Finn Surman
CB	5	Michael Boxall
LB	13	Liberato Cacace	(substituted off) 68'
RM	10	Sarpreet Singh	(substituted off) 90+2'
CM	6	Joe Bell
CM	8	Marko Stamenić	(substituted off) 90+2'
LM	11	Elijah Just
CF	9	Chris Wood (c)
CF	20	Callum McCowatt	(substituted off) 68'
Substitutions:
MF	19	Ben Old	(substituted on) 68'
MF	23	Ryan Thomas	(substituted on) 68'
DF	24	Callan Elliot	(substituted on) 78'
FW	21	Jesse Randall	(substituted on) 90+2'
DF	4	Tyler Bindon	(substituted on) 90+2'
Manager:
(England) Darren Bazeley

Man of the Match:
Ramin Rezaeian (Iran)

Assistant referees:
Alberto Morín (Mexico)
Marco Bisguerra (Mexico)
Fourth official:
Yusuke Araki (Japan)
Reserve assistant referee:
Jun Mihara (Japan)
Video assistant referee:
Erick Miranda (Mexico)
Assistant video assistant referee:
Fedayi San (Switzerland)
Support video assistant referee:
Bastian Dankert (Germany)

=== Belgium vs Iran ===
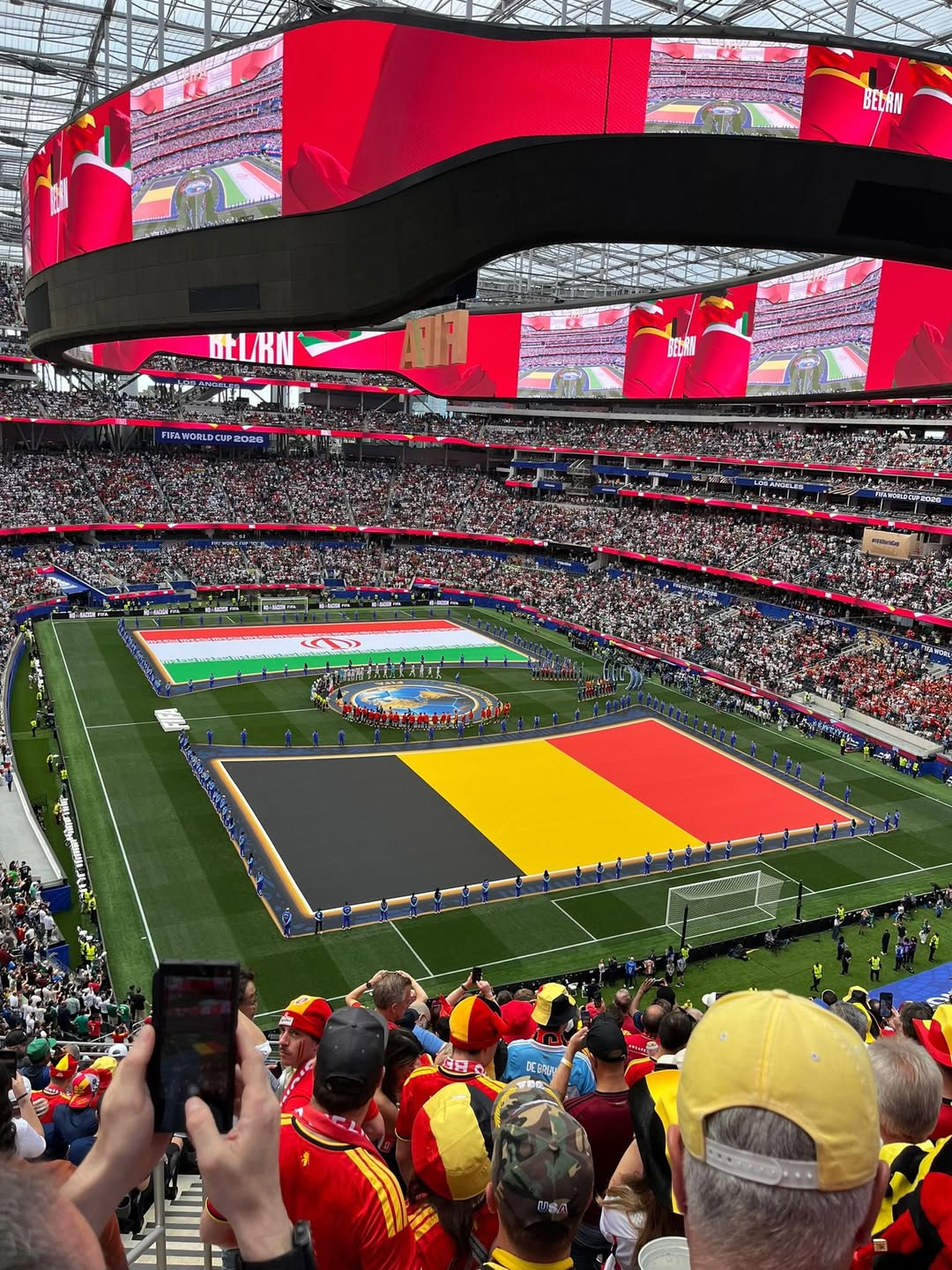
SoFi Stadium during the pre-match ceremony

The two teams had never met before.

Both teams struggled to make and all goals throughout the match and ultimately, both teams ended with a clean sheet altogether, with Alireza Beiranvand being chosen as Man of the Match for his consistenies in the match, with Nathan Ngoy being sent off with a straight red card for his reckless tackle.

June 21, 2026
12:00 p.m.

Belgium	0–0	Iran
	(Note: "Belgium vs IR Iran | First Stage | FIFA World Cup 2026". FIFA. Retrieved June 21, 2026.; "Match Report – Group G – Belgium v. IR Iran". FIFA. June 21, 2026. Retrieved June 21, 2026.; "Post match summary report – Group G – Belgium v. IR Iran". FIFA. June 22, 2026. Retrieved June 22, 2026.)

SoFi Stadium, Inglewood
Attendance: 70,317
Referee: Darío Herrera (Argentina)

Belgium	Iran

GK	1	Thibaut Courtois
RB	15	Thomas Meunier		(substituted off) 58'
CB	25	Nathan Ngoy	(red card) 66'
CB	4	Brandon Mechele
LB	5	Maxim De Cuyper
CM	23	Nicolas Raskin		(substituted off) 58'
CM	8	Youri Tielemans (c)
RW	22	Alexis Saelemaekers		(substituted off) 58'
AM	7	Kevin De Bruyne		(substituted off) 87'
LW	10	Leandro Trossard
CF	9	Romelu Lukaku	(yellow card) 3'	(substituted off) 73'
Substitutions:
DF	21	Timothy Castagne		(substituted on) 58'
MF	20	Hans Vanaken		(substituted on) 58'
FW	14	Dodi Lukébakio		(substituted on) 58'
DF	3	Arthur Theate		(substituted on) 73'
FW	26	Matias Fernandez-Pardo		(substituted on) 87'
Manager:
(France) Rudi Garcia

GK	1	Alireza Beiranvand
CB	13	Hossein Kanaanizadegan
CB	4	Shojae Khalilzadeh
CB	19	Ali Nemati
RWB	2	Saleh Hardani		(substituted off) 46'
LWB	3	Ehsan Hajsafi (c)		(substituted off) 66'
CM	14	Saman Ghoddos		(substituted off) 79'
CM	6	Saeid Ezatolahi	(yellow card) 33'	(substituted off) 85'
RF	23	Ramin Rezaeian
CF	9	Mehdi Taremi
LF	8	Mohammad Mohebi		(substituted off) 66'
Substitutions:
MF	7	Alireza Jahanbakhsh		(substituted on) 46'
MF	16	Mahdi Torabi		(substituted on) 66'
DF	5	Milad Mohammadi		(substituted on) 66'
FW	20	Shahriyar Moghanlou		(substituted on) 79'
FW	18	Amirhossein Hosseinzadeh		(substituted on) 85'
Manager:
Amir Ghalenoei

Man of the Match:
Alireza Beiranvand (Iran)

Assistant referees:
Cristian Navarro (Argentina)
Gabriel Chade (Argentina)
Fourth official:
Yusuke Araki (Japan)
Reserve assistant referee:
Jun Mihara (Japan)
Video assistant referee:
Hernán Mastrángelo (Argentina)
Assistant video assistant referee:
Leodán González (Uruguay)
Support video assistant referee:
Carlos del Cerro Grande (Spain)

=== New Zealand vs Egypt ===
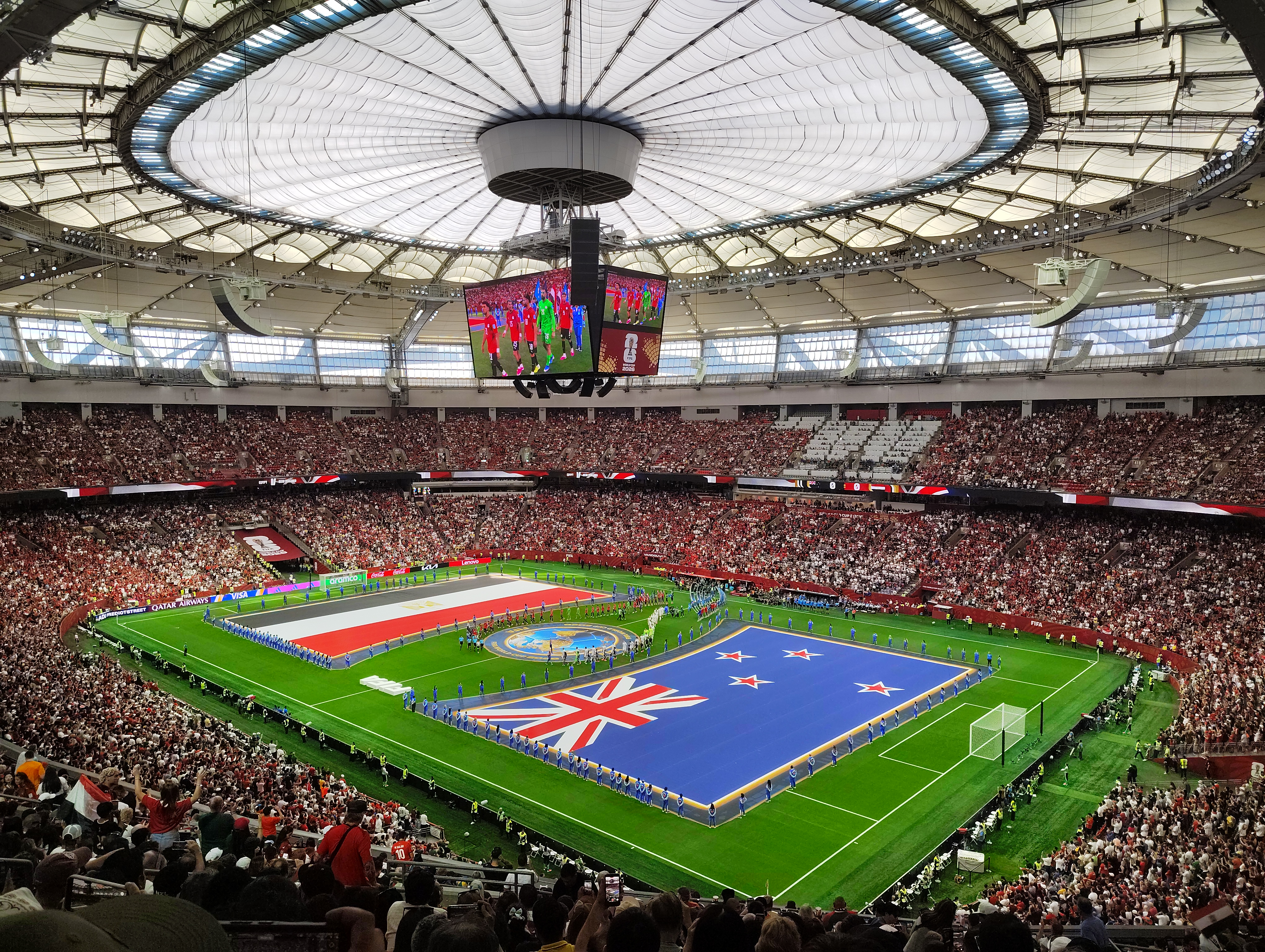
Pre-match ceremony between New Zealand and Egypt

The two teams had faced each other three times, most recently in the 2024 FIFA Series, which Egypt won by 1–0.

This was the first World Cup match won by Egypt in its history since their debut in 1934.

New Zealand suffered its first World Cup defeat in 44 years, having exited its last tournament appearance in 2010 during the group stage as the only undefeated team.

June 21, 2026
6:00 p.m.

New Zealand	1–3	Egypt
Surman 15'	(Note: "New Zealand vs Egypt | First Stage | FIFA World Cup 2026". FIFA. Retrieved June 22, 2026.; "Match Report – Group G – New Zealand v. Egypt". FIFA. June 22, 2026. Retrieved June 22, 2026.; "Post match summary report – Group G – New Zealand v. Egypt". FIFA. June 22, 2026. Retrieved June 22, 2026.)	Ziko 58'; Salah 67'; Trézéguet 82'

BC Place, Vancouver
Attendance: 52,497
Referee: Omar Al Ali (United Arab Emirates)

New Zealand	Egypt

GK	1	Max Crocombe
RB	2	Tim Payne		(substituted off) 85'
CB	16	Finn Surman
CB	5	Michael Boxall
LB	13	Liberato Cacace		(substituted off) 76'
RM	10	Sarpreet Singh	(yellow card) 20'	(substituted off) 76'
CM	6	Joe Bell
CM	8	Marko Stamenić
LM	11	Elijah Just		(substituted off) 85'
CF	9	Chris Wood (c)
CF	20	Callum McCowatt	(yellow card) 34'	(substituted off) 66'
Substitutions:
MF	19	Ben Old		(substituted on) 66'
MF	23	Ryan Thomas		(substituted on) 76'
FW	21	Jesse Randall		(substituted on) 76'
DF	4	Tyler Bindon		(substituted on) 85'
DF	3	Francis de Vries		(substituted on) 85'
Manager:
(England) Darren Bazeley

GK	23	Mostafa Shobeir
RB	3	Mohamed Hany
CB	2	Yasser Ibrahim
CB	14	Hamdy Fathy		(substituted off) 41'
LB	13	Ahmed Fatouh
CM	19	Marwan Attia
CM	17	Mohanad Lasheen	(yellow card) 17'
RW	11	Mostafa Ziko		(substituted off) 76'
AM	10	Mohamed Salah (c)		(substituted off) 84'
LW	8	Emam Ashour		(substituted off) 84'
CF	22	Omar Marmoush		(substituted off) 76'
Substitutions:
DF	5	Ramy Rabia		(substituted on) 41'
FW	9	Hamza Abdelkarim		(substituted on) 76'
FW	7	Trézéguet		(substituted on) 76'
DF	4	Hossam Abdelmaguid		(substituted on) 84'	(substituted off) 90+9' (con.)
FW	25	Zizo		(substituted on) 84'
DF	6	Mohamed Abdelmonem		(substituted on) 90+9'
Manager:
Hossam Hassan

Man of the Match:
Mohamed Salah (Egypt)

Assistant referees:
Mohamed Al-Hammadi (United Arab Emirates)
Taleb Al-Marri (Qatar)
Fourth official:
Kevin Ortega (Peru)
Reserve assistant referee:
Michael Orué (Peru)
Video assistant referee:
Mohammed Obaid Khadim (United Arab Emirates)
Assistant video assistant referee:
Shaun Evans (Australia)
Support video assistant referee:
Armando Villarreal (United States)

=== Egypt vs Iran ===
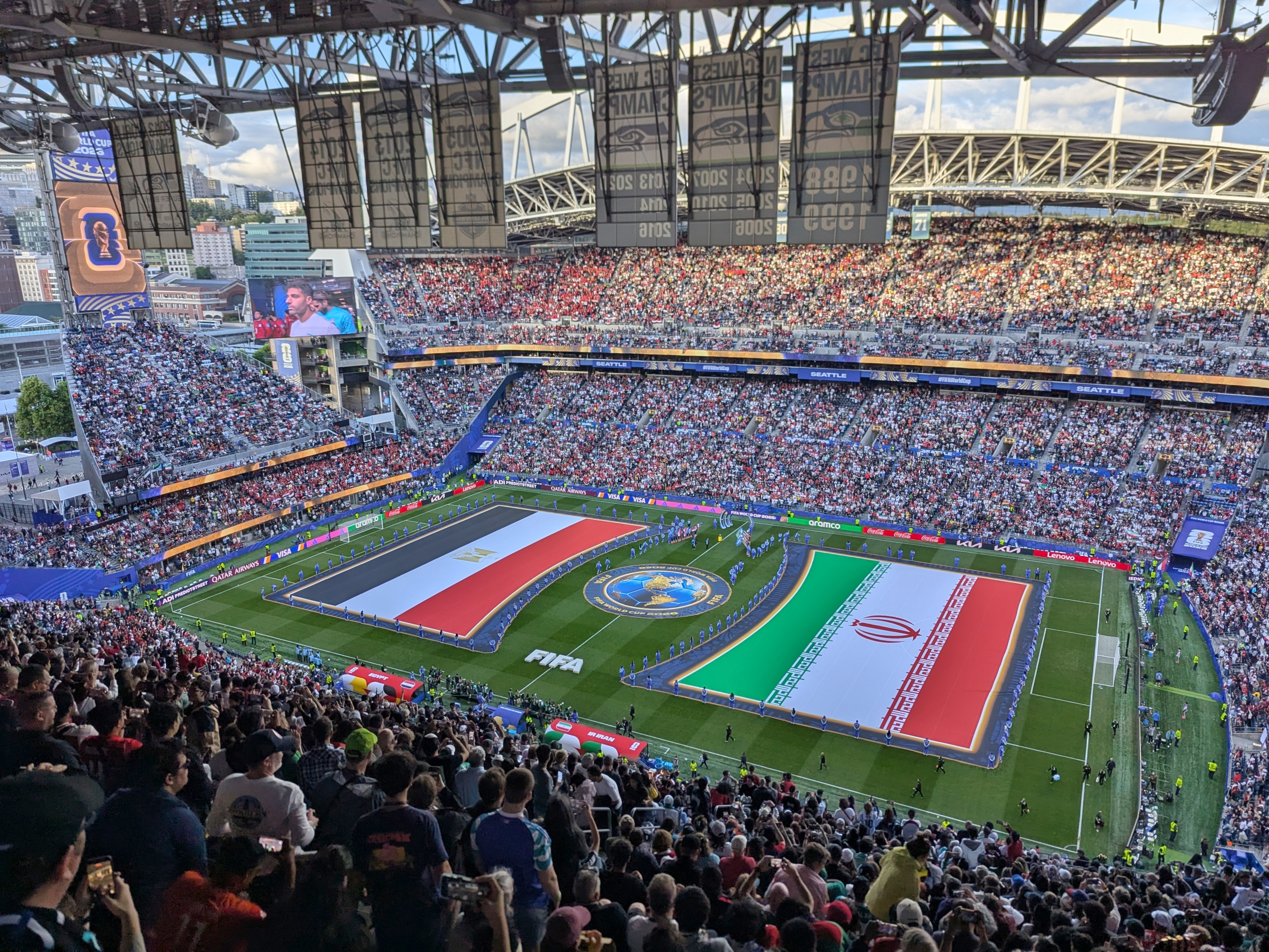
Pre-match ceremony between Egypt and Iran

The two teams had faced each other twice, most recently in the 2000 LG Cup; Egypt won 8–7 on penalties following a 1–1 draw.

A "Pride Match" was planned in advance to take place in Seattle, organized by the local committee to tie into the local celebration and without endorsement by FIFA. After the draw and release of the schedule in December 2025, it was determined that this match would feature Egypt and Iran, two countries where LGBT rights are severely restricted (see LGBT rights in Egypt and Iran) and homosexuality is punishable by law, including the death penalty in Iran. Seattle's Pride Match Advisory Committee spokesperson said "The Pride Match has been scheduled to celebrate and elevate Pride events in Seattle and across the country and it was planned well in advance." Iranian Football Federation President Mehdi Taj said both countries had "objections" and that the branding was an "irrational move that supports a certain group." Iran was planning to appeal the decision. The Egyptian Football Association also sent a formal letter to FIFA Secretary General Mattias Grafström rejecting "in absolute terms" LGBTQ connections to the game. A day before the match, Iran requested FIFA to ban pride flags inside the stadium, as well as preventing any "ceremonies or promotional activities" in support of the community, which was rejected. Demonstrators against the Iranian government and the criminalization of homosexuality in both competing countries were present around the match, many sporting Pride rainbow.

Following a goal for each team early on, Shojae Khalilzadeh scored three minutes into stoppage time to seemingly secure Iran's first-ever World Cup knockout berth. However, VAR disallowed the strike for offside, forcing Iran to settle for a 1–1 draw. Following a 3–3 draw between Algeria and Austria in Group J and Senegal's 5–0 victory over Iraq in Group I, Iran was eliminated in the group stage. They dropped to 9th place below Senegal in the third-place rankings, marking their seventh overall failure to advance.

With an estimated 107.4 million viewers, this match became the most-watched broadcast in Middle East and North Africa (MENA) history and the most-viewed match of the FIFA World Cup.

June 26, 2026
8:00 p.m.

Egypt	1–1	Iran
Saber 5'	(Note: "Egypt vs IR Iran | First Stage | FIFA World Cup 2026". FIFA. Retrieved June 27, 2026.; "Match Report – Group G – Egypt v. IR Iran". FIFA. June 27, 2026. Retrieved June 27, 2026.; "Post match summary report – Group G – Egypt v. IR Iran". FIFA. June 27, 2026. Retrieved June 27, 2026.)	Rezaeian 14'

Lumen Field, Seattle
Attendance: 66,925
Referee: Szymon Marciniak (Poland)

Egypt	Iran

GK	23	Mostafa Shobeir
RB	3	Mohamed Hany
CB	5	Ramy Rabia
CB	6	Mohamed Abdelmonem		(substituted off) 14'
LB	13	Ahmed Fatouh
CM	21	Mahmoud Saber	(yellow card) 19'	(substituted off) 46'
CM	17	Mohanad Lasheen	(yellow card) 90+2'
RW	8	Emam Ashour		(substituted off) 46'
AM	10	Mohamed Salah (c)		(substituted off) 57'
LW	7	Trézéguet
CF	11	Mostafa Ziko		(substituted off) 76'
Substitutions:
DF	2	Yasser Ibrahim	(yellow card) 41'	(substituted on) 14'
FW	22	Omar Marmoush		(substituted on) 46'
MF	19	Marwan Attia		(substituted on) 46'
FW	25	Zizo		(substituted on) 57'
FW	9	Hamza Abdelkarim		(substituted on) 76'
Manager:
Hossam Hassan

GK	1	Alireza Beiranvand
CB	13	Hossein Kanaanizadegan	(yellow card) 19'	(substituted off) 46'
CB	4	Shojae Khalilzadeh	(yellow card) 90+4'
CB	19	Ali Nemati	(yellow card) 43'
RWB	23	Ramin Rezaeian
LWB	5	Milad Mohammadi
RM	14	Saman Ghoddos		(substituted off) 67'
CM	6	Saeid Ezatolahi	(yellow card) 79'
CM	21	Mohammad Ghorbani
LM	8	Mohammad Mohebi		(substituted off) 90+1'
CF	9	Mehdi Taremi (c)
Substitutions:
DF	2	Saleh Hardani		(substituted on) 46'
FW	20	Shahriyar Moghanlou		(substituted on) 67'
MF	7	Alireza Jahanbakhsh		(substituted on) 90+1'
Manager:
Amir Ghalenoei

Man of the Match:
Ramin Rezaeian (Iran)

Assistant referees:
Tomasz Listkiewicz (Poland)
Adam Kupsik (Poland)
Fourth official:
Yusuke Araki (Japan)
Reserve assistant referee:
Jun Mihara (Japan)
Video assistant referee:
Tomasz Kwiatkowski (Poland)
Assistant video assistant referee:
Dennis Higler (Netherlands)
Support video assistant referee:
Shaun Evans (Australia)

=== New Zealand vs Belgium ===
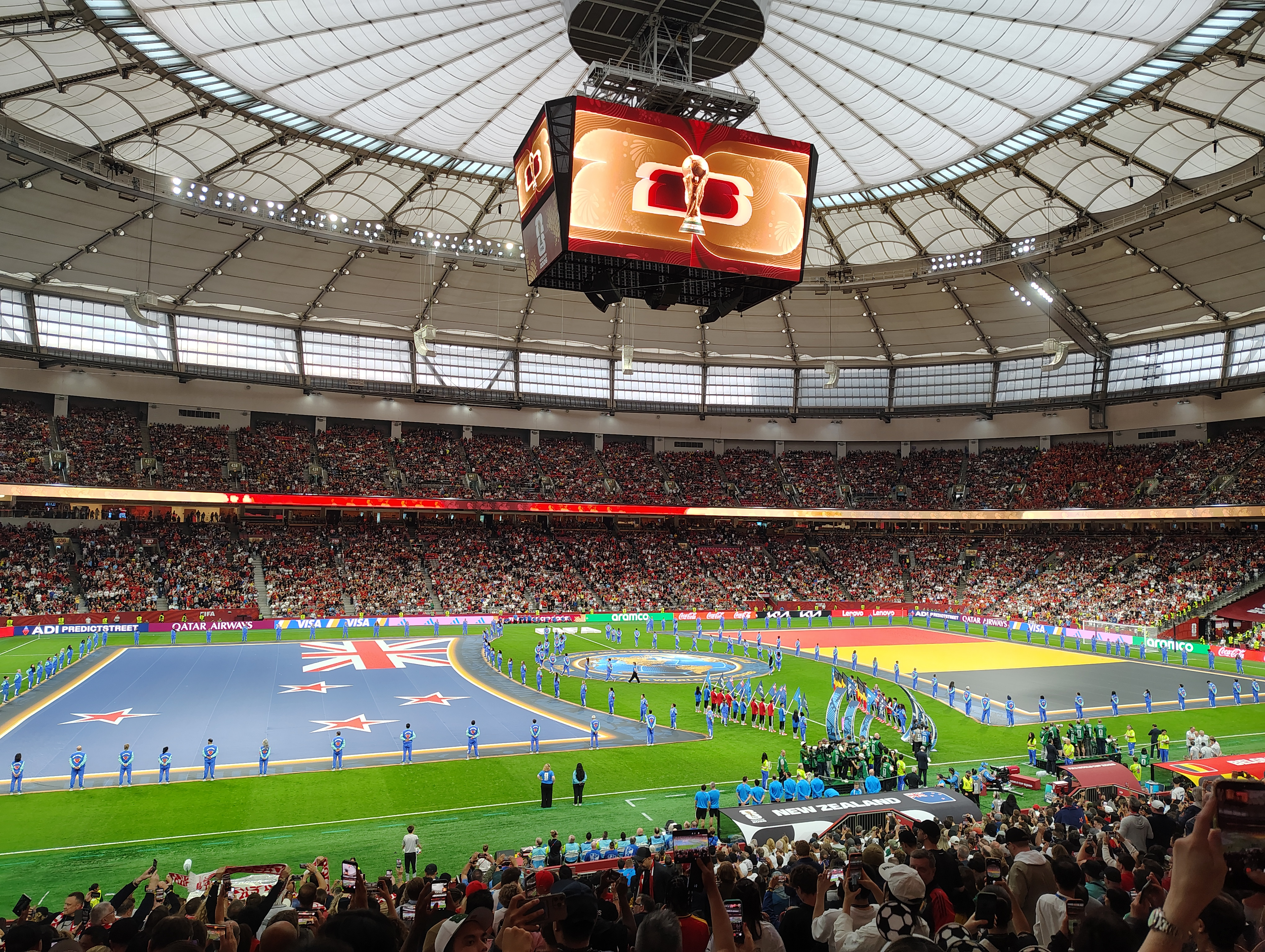
Pre-match ceremony between New Zealand and Belgium

The two teams had never met before.

Belgium scored five goals which were more than enough for the team to ultimately secure their spot at the top of the group, with Leandro Trossard being the Man of the Match. For New Zealand's Elijah Just, this was his third and last goal, though the Belgian team were far too formidable, with New Zealand having fallen to the bottom of the group.

New Zealand failed to secure a single win in its third World Cup appearance, finishing with a lackluster overall record of four draws and five losses across its three tournament campaigns.

June 26, 2026
8:00 p.m.

New Zealand	1–5	Belgium
Just 84'	(Note: "New Zealand vs Belgium | First Stage | FIFA World Cup 2026". FIFA. Retrieved June 27, 2026.; "Match Report – Group G – New Zealand v. Belgium". FIFA. June 27, 2026. Retrieved June 27, 2026.; "Post match summary report – Group G – New Zealand v. Belgium". FIFA. June 27, 2026. Retrieved June 27, 2026.)	Trossard 28', 50'; De Bruyne 66'; Lukaku 86'; Saelemaekers 90+4'

BC Place, Vancouver
Attendance: 52,497
Referee: Adham Makhadmeh (Jordan)

New Zealand	Belgium

GK	1	Max Crocombe
RB	2	Tim Payne		(substituted off) 64'
CB	16	Finn Surman
CB	4	Tyler Bindon
LB	13	Liberato Cacace		(substituted off) 79'
CM	6	Joe Bell		(substituted off) 64'
CM	8	Marko Stamenić	(yellow card) 46'
RW	10	Sarpreet Singh		(substituted off) 46'
AM	23	Ryan Thomas		(substituted off) 46'
LW	11	Elijah Just	(yellow card) 56'
CF	9	Chris Wood (c)
Substitutions:
FW	21	Jesse Randall		(substituted on) 46'
MF	19	Ben Old		(substituted on) 46'
DF	5	Michael Boxall		(substituted on) 64'
MF	20	Callum McCowatt		(substituted on) 64'
DF	3	Francis de Vries		(substituted on) 79'
Manager:
(England) Darren Bazeley

GK	1	Thibaut Courtois
RB	21	Timothy Castagne
CB	4	Brandon Mechele
CB	3	Arthur Theate
LB	5	Maxim De Cuyper
CM	8	Youri Tielemans (c)	(substituted off) 85'
CM	20	Hans Vanaken
RW	11	Jérémy Doku	(substituted off) 56'
AM	7	Kevin De Bruyne	(substituted off) 72'
LW	10	Leandro Trossard	(substituted off) 72'
CF	17	Charles De Ketelaere	(substituted off) 85'
Substitutions:
FW	26	Matias Fernandez-Pardo	(substituted on) 56'
FW	22	Alexis Saelemaekers	(substituted on) 72'
MF	24	Amadou Onana	(substituted on) 72'
MF	23	Nicolas Raskin	(substituted on) 85'
FW	9	Romelu Lukaku	(substituted on) 85'
Manager:
(France) Rudi Garcia

Man of the Match:
Leandro Trossard (Belgium)

Assistant referees:
Mohammad Al-Kalaf (Jordan)
Ahmad Al-Roalle (Jordan)
Fourth official:
Kevin Ortega (Peru)
Reserve assistant referee:
Michael Orué (Peru)
Video assistant referee:
Juan Soto (Venezuela)
Assistant video assistant referee:
Erick Miranda (Mexico)
Support video assistant referee:
Antonio García (Uruguay)

== Discipline ==
The team conduct ("fair play") score would have been used as a tiebreaker if the head-to-head and overall records of teams were tied. It would also be used as a tiebreaker for the third-place ranking between groups if the overall records of teams were tied. The score was calculated based on yellow and red cards received by players and team officials in all group matches as follows:

- yellow card: −1 point;
- indirect red card (second yellow card): −3 points;
- direct red card: −4 points;
- yellow card and direct red card: −5 points;

Only one of the above deductions could be applied to a player or team official in a single match.

Team	Match 1				Match 2				Match 3				Score
Team	Yellow card	(yellow card) (yellow-red card)	Red card	(yellow card) (red card)	Yellow card	(yellow card) (yellow-red card)	Red card	(yellow card) (red card)	Yellow card	(yellow card) (yellow-red card)	Red card	(yellow card) (red card)	Score
New Zealand					2				2				–4
Egypt	2				1				3				–6
Iran	1				1				4				–6
Belgium	2				1		1						–7
