= 2026 FIFA World Cup Group H =

FIFA World Cup group

Group H of the 2026 FIFA World Cup took place from June 15 to 26, 2026. The group consisted of Spain, Cape Verde, Saudi Arabia, and Uruguay.

Spain finished at the top of the group with two group game wins, allowing them to advance to the round of 32, where they defeated multiple teams in the knockout stage and became champions of this World Cup.

Cape Verde finished as runners-up after drawing all three of its group matches, becoming the first World Cup debutant (and the smallest nation) to advance to the knockout stage since Slovakia in 2010.

Uruguay finished third in the group and were eliminated, as their performance meant it would be impossible for them to be among the top eight third-place teams. Saudi Arabia finished fourth based on goal difference, and were also eliminated.

== Teams ==
Draw position	Team	Pot	Confederation	Method of qualification	Date of qualification	Finals appearance	Last appearance	Previous best performance	FIFA Rankings	
Draw position	Team	Pot	Confederation	Method of qualification	Date of qualification	Finals appearance	Last appearance	Previous best performance	November 2025 (Note: The rankings of November 2025 were used for seeding for the final draw.)	June 2026
H1	Spain	1	UEFA	UEFA Group E winner	November 18, 2025	17th	2022	Winner (2010)	1	2
H2	Cape Verde	4	CAF	CAF Group D winner	October 13, 2025	1st	—	—	68	67
H3	Saudi Arabia	3	AFC	AFC fourth round Group B winner	October 14, 2025	7th	2022	Round of 16 (1994)	60	61
H4	Uruguay	2	CONMEBOL	CONMEBOL round robin fourth place	September 4, 2025	15th	2022	Winner (1930, 1950)	16	16

== Standings ==
Pos	Team	Pld	W	D	L	GF	GA	GD	Pts	Qualification
1	Spain	3	2	1	0	5	0	+5	7	Advance to knockout stage
2	Cape Verde	3	0	3	0	2	2	0	3	Advance to knockout stage
3	Uruguay	3	0	2	1	3	4	−1	2 (Note: Tied on head-to-head result (Saudi Arabia 1–1 Uruguay). Overall goal difference was used as the tiebreaker.)	
4	Saudi Arabia	3	0	2	1	1	5	−4	2	

Source: FIFA
Rules for classification: Group stage tiebreakers
Notes:

In the round of 32:

- The winner of Group H, Spain, advanced to play the runner-up of Group J, Austria.
- The runner-up of Group H, Cape Verde, advanced to play the winner of Group J, Argentina.

== Matches ==
All times listed are local.

=== Spain vs Cape Verde ===
The teams had never met before. The fixture marked Cape Verde's debut at the FIFA World Cup. The country was the second least populated country to qualify for the tournament, before Curaçao achieved qualification.

In the first half Spain's Ferran Torres hit the bar with a shot from close range after a header back from Marc Cucurella on the left. In the second half Mikel Oyarzabal had a shot blocked by Pico. Late on Diney almost put Cape Verde into the lead when he headed a corner straight at Spanish goalkeeper Unai Simón with the game finishing 0–0 and producing one of the biggest shocks of the World Cup, with Vozinha as the Man of the Match for making seven saves in his World Cup debut.

Cape Verde committed a single foul during this game, the fewest in a FIFA World Cup match since data collection began in 1966.

June 15, 2026
12:00 p.m. UTC−4

Spain	0–0	Cape Verde
	(Note: "Spain vs Cabo Verde | First Stage | FIFA World Cup 2026". FIFA. Retrieved June 15, 2026.; "Match Report – Group H – Spain v. Cabo Verde". FIFA. Retrieved June 15, 2026.; "Post match summary report – Group H – Spain v. Cabo Verde". FIFA. June 15, 2026. Retrieved June 17, 2026.)

Mercedes-Benz Stadium, Atlanta
Attendance: 67,640
Referee: Adham Makhadmeh (Jordan)

Spain	Cape Verde

GK	23	Unai Simón
RB	5	Marcos Llorente
CB	22	Pau Cubarsí
CB	14	Aymeric Laporte
LB	24	Marc Cucurella
DM	16	Rodri (c)		(substituted off) 87'
CM	20	Pedri	(yellow card) 90+3'
CM	8	Fabián Ruiz		(substituted off) 71'
RF	7	Ferran Torres		(substituted off) 81'
CF	21	Mikel Oyarzabal
LF	9	Gavi		(substituted off) 71'
Substitutions:
MF	6	Mikel Merino		(substituted on) 71'
FW	19	Lamine Yamal		(substituted on) 71'
FW	10	Dani Olmo		(substituted on) 81'
FW	17	Nico Williams		(substituted on) 87'
Manager:
Luis de la Fuente

GK	1	Vozinha
RB	22	Steven Moreira
CB	4	Pico
CB	3	Diney
LB	13	Sidny Lopes Cabral	(yellow card) 16'	(substituted off) 76'
DM	6	Kevin Pina
CM	15	Laros Duarte		(substituted off) 61'
CM	10	Jamiro Monteiro		(substituted off) 79'
RF	20	Ryan Mendes (c)
CF	19	Dailon Livramento		(substituted off) 61'
LF	7	Jovane Cabral		(substituted off) 61'
Substitutions:
MF	21	Nuno da Costa		(substituted on) 61'
MF	17	Willy Semedo		(substituted on) 61'
MF	14	Deroy Duarte		(substituted on) 61'
MF	8	João Paulo		(substituted on) 76'
MF	18	Telmo Arcanjo		(substituted on) 79'
Manager:
Bubista

Man of the Match:
Vozinha (Cape Verde)

Assistant referees:
Mohammad Al-Kalaf (Jordan)
Ahmad Al-Roalle (Jordan)
Fourth official:
Andrés Rojas (Colombia)
Reserve assistant referee:
Alexander Guzmán (Colombia)
Video assistant referee:
Joe Dickerson (United States)
Assistant video assistant referee:
Khamis Al-Marri (Qatar)
Support video assistant referee:
Fu Ming (China)

=== Saudi Arabia vs Uruguay ===
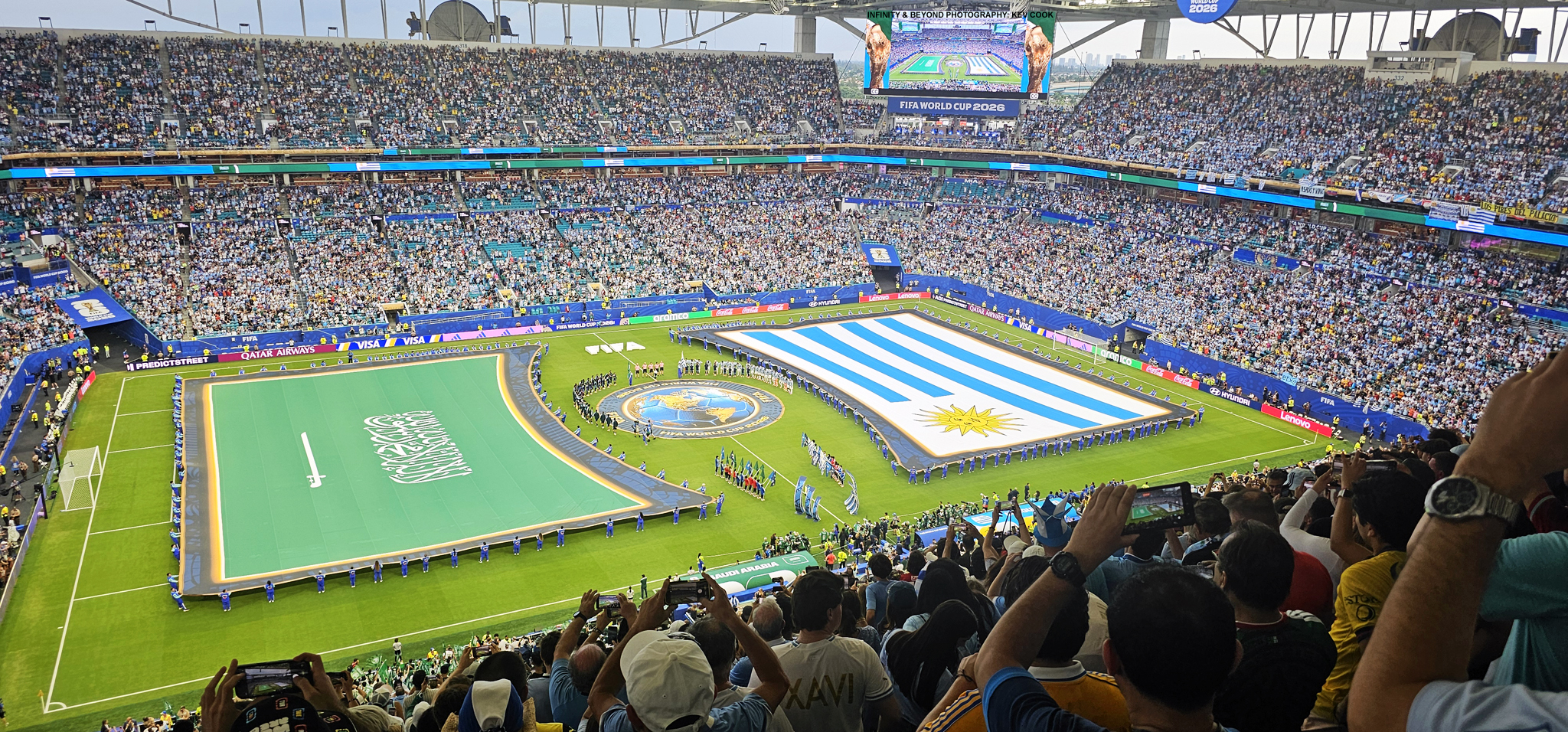
Pre-match ceremony between Saudi Arabia and Uruguay.

The teams had previously faced each other thrice, most recently in Uruguay's 1–0 win at the 2018 FIFA World Cup.

In the 41st minute, Saudi Arabia went in front, Hassan Al-Tambakti's header from a corner on the right was parried out by Uruguay keeper Fernando Muslera where Abdulelah Al-Amri finished the rebound with his right foot to the net from close range. With ten minutes to go, Maximiliano Araújo scored for Uruguay with a shot from the left after Mohammed Al-Owais had initially made a save to make it 1–1, which also became the final result of the affair.

June 15, 2026
6:00 p.m. UTC−4

Saudi Arabia	1–1	Uruguay
Al-Amri 41'	(Note: "Saudi Arabia vs Uruguay | First Stage | FIFA World Cup 2026". FIFA. Retrieved June 15, 2026.; "Match Report – Group H – Saudi Arabia v. Uruguay". FIFA. Retrieved June 15, 2026.; "Post match summary report – Group H – Saudi Arabia v. Uruguay". FIFA. June 15, 2026. Retrieved June 17, 2026.)	M. Araújo 80'

Hard Rock Stadium, Miami Gardens
Attendance: 62,764
Referee: Maurizio Mariani (Italy)

Saudi Arabia	Uruguay

GK	21	Mohammed Al-Owais
RB	12	Saud Abdulhamid		(substituted off) 90+3'
CB	5	Hassan Al-Tambakti
CB	4	Abdulelah Al-Amri	(yellow card) 44'
LB	24	Moteb Al-Harbi		(substituted off) 90+3'
RM	26	Mohammed Abu Al-Shamat		(substituted off) 81'
CM	23	Mohamed Kanno
CM	15	Abdullah Al-Khaibari
LM	10	Salem Al-Dawsari (c)
CF	9	Firas Al-Buraikan		(substituted off) 90+3'
CF	7	Musab Al-Juwayr		(substituted off) 63'
Substitutions:
MF	6	Nasser Al-Dawsari		(substituted on) 63'
DF	13	Nawaf Boushal		(substituted on) 81'
DF	3	Ali Lajami		(substituted on) 90+3'
MF	18	Alaa Al-Hejji		(substituted on) 90+3'
FW	19	Abdullah Al-Hamdan		(substituted on) 90+3'
Manager:
(Greece) Georgios Donis

GK	23	Fernando Muslera
RB	13	Guillermo Varela
CB	3	Sebastián Cáceres
CB	16	Mathías Olivera
LB	17	Matías Viña	(substituted off) 46'
RM	8	Federico Valverde (c)
CM	5	Manuel Ugarte	(substituted off) 72'
CM	6	Rodrigo Bentancur
LM	20	Maximiliano Araújo	(substituted off) 81'
CF	21	Federico Viñas	(substituted off) 90'
CF	9	Darwin Núñez	(substituted off) 46'
Substitutions:
MF	14	Agustín Canobbio	(substituted on) 46'
MF	25	Juan Manuel Sanabria	(substituted on) 46'
MF	7	Nicolás de la Cruz	(substituted on) 72'
MF	18	Brian Rodríguez	(substituted on) 81'
FW	19	Rodrigo Aguirre	(substituted on) 90'
Manager:
(Argentina) Marcelo Bielsa

Man of the Match:
Federico Valverde (Uruguay)

Assistant referees:
Daniele Bindoni (Italy)
Alberto Tegoni (Italy)
Fourth official:
Drew Fischer (Canada)
Reserve assistant referee:
Micheal Barwegen (Canada)
Video assistant referee:
Marco Di Bello (Italy)
Assistant video assistant referee:
Ivan Bebek (Croatia)
Support video assistant referee:
Jérôme Brisard (France)

=== Spain vs Saudi Arabia ===
The teams had met three times, including their first encounter in Spain's 1–0 group stage victory at the 2006 FIFA World Cup. Spain won all matches, most recently a 5–0 friendly in 2012.

In the 10th minute, Spain went in front when Lamine Yamal scored with a low finish at the back post after a low cross from Mikel Oyarzabal from the left. In the 21st minute, Mikel Oyarzabal made it 2–0 when he flicked the ball left-footed into the right of the net from six yards out. Oyarzabal got a third and his second three minutes later when he finished to the right of the net from close range after a header across goal from Dani Olmo on the left. It was 4–0 three minutes into the second half, a volley from Marc Cucurella after a corner from the left was saved by Mohammed Al-Owais with the rebound coming back off Hassan Al-Tambakti and into the right corner of the net.

The fixture was Saudi Arabia's worst defeat at the World Cup since their 5–0 loss to hosts Russia in 2018, and their third-largest defeat in tournament history, tied with their 4–0 losses against hosts France in 1998 and Ukraine in 2006.

June 21, 2026
12:00 p.m. UTC−4

Spain	4–0	Saudi Arabia
Yamal 10'; Oyarzabal 21', 24'; Al-Tambakti 49' (o.g.)	(Note: "Spain vs Saudi Arabia | First Stage | FIFA World Cup 2026". FIFA. Retrieved June 21, 2026.; "Match Report – Group H – Spain v. Saudi Arabia". FIFA. June 21, 2026. Retrieved June 21, 2026.; "Post match summary report – Group H – Spain v. Saudi Arabia". FIFA. June 22, 2026. Retrieved June 22, 2026.)

Mercedes-Benz Stadium, Atlanta
Attendance: 68,239
Referee: Raphael Claus (Brazil)

Spain	Saudi Arabia

GK	23	Unai Simón
RB	12	Pedro Porro
CB	22	Pau Cubarsí
CB	14	Aymeric Laporte
LB	24	Marc Cucurella
DM	16	Rodri (c)
CM	20	Pedri	(substituted off) 70'
CM	10	Dani Olmo	(substituted off) 61'
RF	19	Lamine Yamal	(substituted off) 46'
CF	21	Mikel Oyarzabal	(substituted off) 46'
LF	15	Álex Baena	(substituted off) 61'
Substitutions:
FW	7	Ferran Torres	(substituted on) 46'
FW	11	Yéremy Pino	(substituted on) 46'
MF	6	Mikel Merino	(substituted on) 61'
FW	17	Nico Williams	(substituted on) 61'
MF	8	Fabián Ruiz	(substituted on) 70'
Manager:
Luis de la Fuente

GK	21	Mohammed Al-Owais
CB	4	Abdulelah Al-Amri		(substituted off) 60'
CB	3	Ali Lajami
CB	5	Hassan Al-Tambakti
RWB	12	Saud Abdulhamid
LWB	24	Moteb Al-Harbi
RM	7	Musab Al-Juwayr		(substituted off) 46'
CM	15	Abdullah Al-Khaibari		(substituted off) 46'
CM	6	Nasser Al-Dawsari		(substituted off) 90'
LM	10	Salem Al-Dawsari (c)	(yellow card) 30'
CF	9	Firas Al-Buraikan		(substituted off) 60'
Substitutions:
MF	23	Mohamed Kanno	(yellow card) 60'	(substituted on) 46'
FW	19	Abdullah Al-Hamdan		(substituted on) 46'
DF	26	Mohammed Abu Al-Shamat		(substituted on) 60'
MF	18	Alaa Al-Hejji		(substituted on) 60'
FW	17	Khalid Al-Ghannam		(substituted on) 90'
Manager:
(Greece) Georgios Donis

Man of the Match:
Mikel Oyarzabal (Spain)

Assistant referees:
Danilo Manis (Brazil)
Rodrigo Figueiredo (Brazil)
Fourth official:
Andrés Rojas (Colombia)
Reserve assistant referee:
Alexander Guzmán (Colombia)
Video assistant referee:
Nicolás Gallo (Colombia)
Assistant video assistant referee:
Erick Miranda (Mexico)
Support video assistant referee:
Guillermo Pacheco (Mexico)

=== Uruguay vs Cape Verde ===
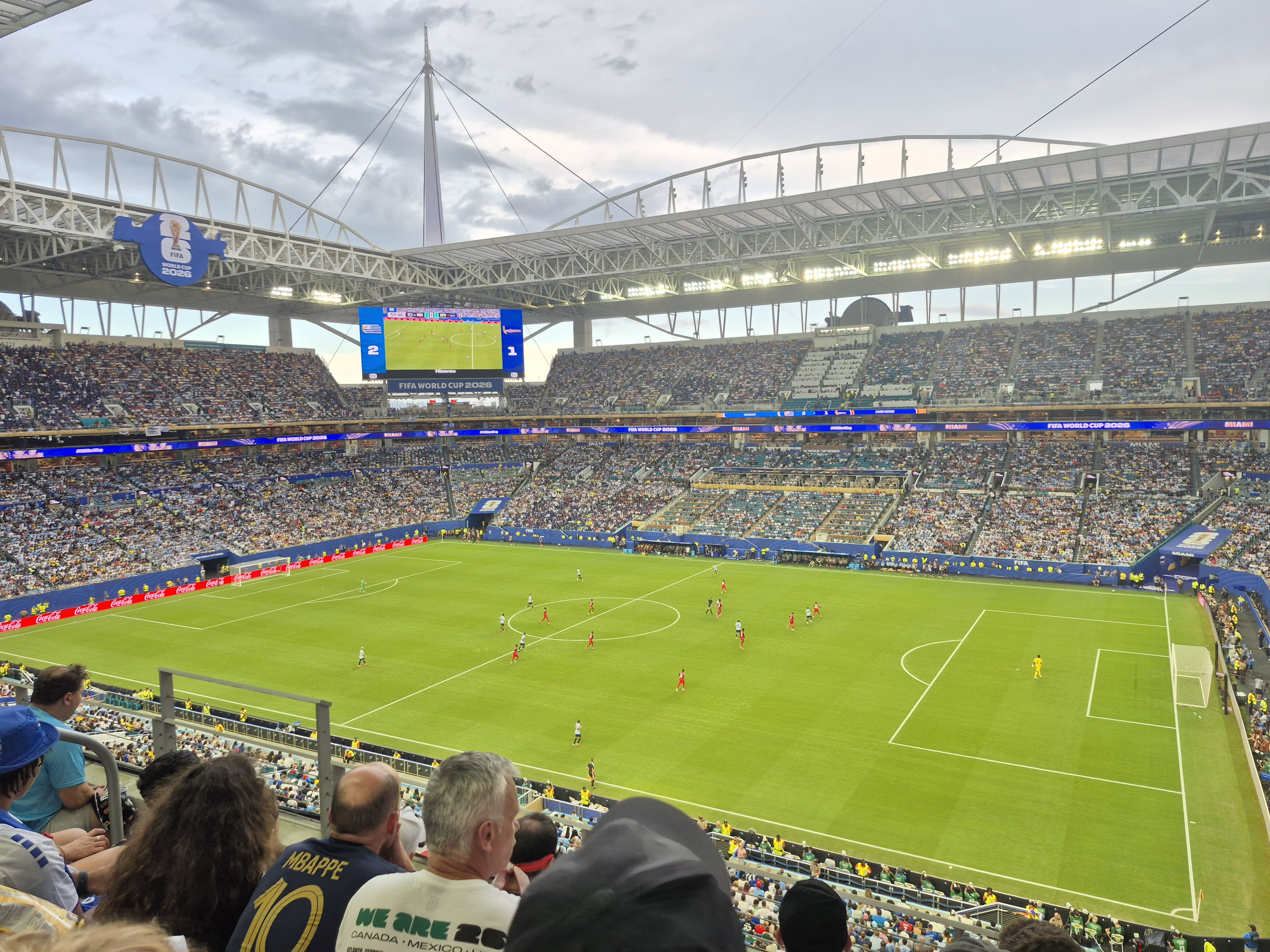
Hard Rock Stadium during the match.

The two teams had never met before.

In the 21st minute, Kevin Pina scored with a low long range right footed free-kick from 30 yards that went through the middle of the defensive wall and into the bottom right corner of the net, it was the first ever goal for Cape Verde in the World Cup Finals. Maximiliano Araújo made it 1–1 the 44th minute when he dived low to head to the net from close range after Sidny Lopes Cabral had headed against his own post. In first-half stoppage time, Agustín Canobbio put Uruguay into a 2–1 lead when he finished low to the net from six yards out after a headed pass from Araújo from the left.

In the 61st minute it was 2–2 when a mistake by Mathías Olivera trying to play the ball across his own box allowed Hélio Varela to intercept and touch the ball to the side of Uruguay goalkeeper Fernando Muslera before side footing into the empty net from outside the penalty area on the right.

June 21, 2026
6:00 p.m. UTC−4

Uruguay	2–2	Cape Verde
M. Araújo 44'; Canobbio 45+6'	(Note: "Uruguay vs Cabo Verde | First Stage | FIFA World Cup 2026". FIFA. Retrieved June 22, 2026.; "Match Report – Group H – Uruguay v. Cabo Verde". FIFA. June 22, 2026. Retrieved June 22, 2026.; "Post match summary report – Group H – Uruguay v. Cabo Verde". FIFA. June 22, 2026. Retrieved June 22, 2026.)	K. Pina 21'; Varela 61'

Hard Rock Stadium, Miami Gardens
Attendance: 64,003
Referee: Espen Eskås (Norway)

Uruguay	Cape Verde

GK	23	Fernando Muslera
RB	13	Guillermo Varela
CB	3	Sebastián Cáceres
CB	16	Mathías Olivera	(yellow card) 58'
LB	25	Juan Manuel Sanabria
DM	5	Manuel Ugarte		(substituted off) 70'
CM	6	Rodrigo Bentancur	(yellow card) 20'
CM	8	Federico Valverde (c)
RF	14	Agustín Canobbio
CF	21	Federico Viñas		(substituted off) 70'
LF	20	Maximiliano Araújo		(substituted off) 81'
Substitutions:
MF	7	Nicolás de la Cruz		(substituted on) 70'
FW	9	Darwin Núñez		(substituted on) 70'
MF	18	Brian Rodríguez		(substituted on) 81'
Manager:
(Argentina) Marcelo Bielsa

GK	1	Vozinha
RB	22	Steven Moreira
CB	4	Pico
CB	3	Diney	(yellow card) 90+3'
LB	13	Sidny Lopes Cabral	(yellow card) 5'
DM	6	Kevin Pina		(substituted off) 70'
CM	20	Ryan Mendes (c)
CM	10	Jamiro Monteiro		(substituted off) 80'
RF	18	Telmo Arcanjo		(substituted off) 46'
CF	9	Gilson Benchimol		(substituted off) 58'
LF	11	Garry Rodrigues		(substituted off) 58'
Substitutions:
MF	14	Deroy Duarte		(substituted on) 46'
MF	26	Hélio Varela		(substituted on) 58'
FW	21	Nuno da Costa		(substituted on) 58'
MF	15	Laros Duarte		(substituted on) 70'
MF	16	Yannick Semedo		(substituted on) 80'
Manager:
Bubista

Man of the Match:
Kevin Pina (Cape Verde)

Assistant referees:
Jan Erik Engan (Norway)
Isaak Bashevkin (Norway)
Fourth official:
Tori Penso (United States)
Reserve assistant referee:
Brooke Mayo (United States)
Video assistant referee:
Willy Delajod (France)
Assistant video assistant referee:
Jérôme Brisard (France)
Support video assistant referee:
Dennis Higler (Netherlands)

=== Cape Verde vs Saudi Arabia ===
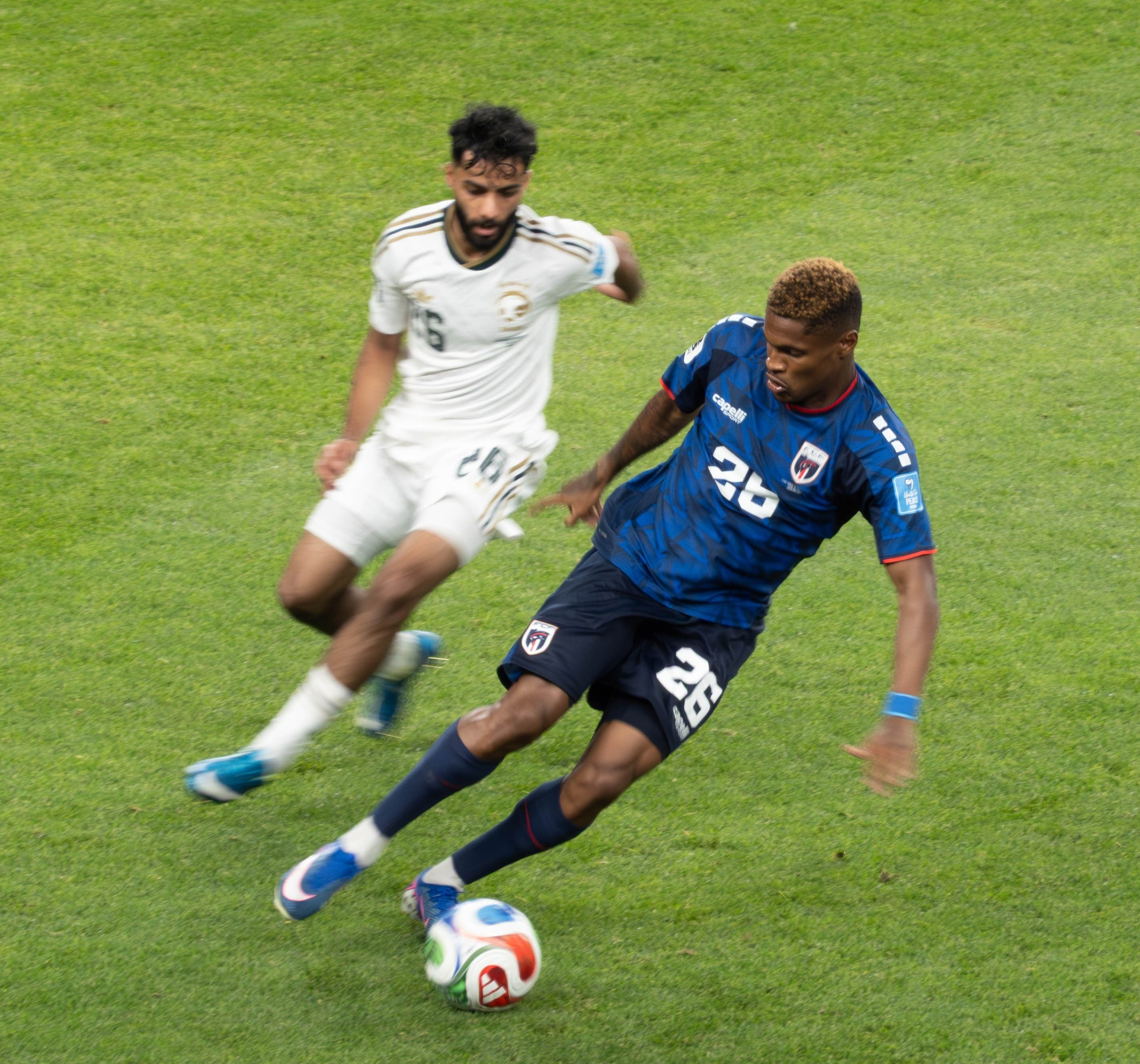
During the match between Cape Verde and Saudi Arabia.

The two teams had never met before.

This result makes Cape Verde the first debutant to qualify past the group stage since Slovakia in 2010, and the first team to do so by drawing all three games since Chile in 1998. Additionally, they are only one of four debutants in the tournament to secure a spot in the round of 32.

In contrast, Saudi Arabia finished bottom of their group for the second consecutive World Cup, resulting in their elimination.

June 26, 2026
7:00 p.m. UTC−5

Cape Verde	0–0	Saudi Arabia
	(Note: "Cabo Verde vs Saudi Arabia | First Stage | FIFA World Cup 2026". FIFA. Retrieved June 27, 2026.; "Match Report – Group H – Cabo Verde v. Saudi Arabia". FIFA. June 27, 2026. Retrieved June 27, 2026.; "Post match summary report – Group H – Cabo Verde v. Saudi Arabia". FIFA. June 27, 2026. Retrieved June 27, 2026.)

NRG Stadium, Houston
Attendance: 68,278
Referee: François Letexier (France)

Cape Verde	Saudi Arabia

GK	1	Vozinha
RB	24	Wagner Pina	(yellow card) 8'	(substituted off) 90+4'
CB	4	Pico
CB	3	Diney
LB	8	João Paulo
DM	6	Kevin Pina
CM	14	Deroy Duarte
CM	10	Jamiro Monteiro		(substituted off) 71'
RF	20	Ryan Mendes (c)		(substituted off) 71'
CF	19	Dailon Livramento		(substituted off) 61'
LF	17	Willy Semedo		(substituted off) 61'
Substitutions:
FW	21	Nuno da Costa		(substituted on) 61'
MF	26	Hélio Varela		(substituted on) 61'
MF	15	Laros Duarte		(substituted on) 71'
MF	11	Garry Rodrigues		(substituted on) 71'
DF	22	Steven Moreira		(substituted on) 90+4'
Manager:
Bubista

GK	21	Mohammed Al-Owais
RB	12	Saud Abdulhamid	(yellow card) 4'
CB	4	Abdulelah Al-Amri
CB	5	Hassan Al-Tambakti		(substituted off) 33'
LB	13	Nawaf Boushal		(substituted off) 82'
RM	20	Sultan Mandash		(substituted off) 65'
CM	15	Abdullah Al-Khaibari		(substituted off) 46'
CM	6	Nasser Al-Dawsari	(yellow card) 67'
LM	10	Salem Al-Dawsari (c)		(substituted off) 65'
CF	9	Firas Al-Buraikan	(yellow card) 90+3'
CF	23	Mohamed Kanno
Substitutions:
DF	3	Ali Lajami		(substituted on) 33'
MF	7	Musab Al-Juwayr		(substituted on) 46'
DF	26	Mohammed Abu Al-Shamat		(substituted on) 65'
FW	19	Abdullah Al-Hamdan		(substituted on) 65'
DF	24	Moteb Al-Harbi		(substituted on) 82'
Manager:
(Greece) Georgios Donis

Man of the Match:
Deroy Duarte (Cape Verde)

Assistant referees:
Cyril Mugnier (France)
Mehdi Rahmouni (France)
Fourth official:
Abongile Tom (South Africa)
Reserve assistant referee:
Zakhele Siwela (South Africa)
Video assistant referee:
Marco Di Bello (Italy)
Assistant video assistant referee:
Willy Delajod (France)
Support video assistant referee:
Joe Dickerson (United States)

=== Uruguay vs Spain ===
The teams had previously met ten times, including twice in the World Cup: a 2–2 final round draw in 1950 and a 0–0 group stage draw in 1990. Their latest encounter was Spain's 2–1 group stage victory at the 2013 FIFA Confederations Cup to keep their unbeaten head to head record. This was the only match in Group H played outside of the United States. Both teams returned to Mexican soil since the 1986 edition.

In the 42nd minute, Álex Baena scored the only goal of the game for Spain when his right-foot shot from the right of the penalty area went thru the hands of Uruguayan goalkeeper Fernando Muslera and into the left of the net. Uruguay's Agustín Canobbio was sent off with a straight red card. In addition, their 1–0 defeat marked the Uruguayan team's second consecutive exit from the group stage, and made it the sole South American team to fail to advance to the round of 32.

June 26, 2026
6:00 p.m. UTC−6

Uruguay	0–1	Spain
	(Note: "Uruguay vs Spain | First Stage | FIFA World Cup 2026". FIFA. Retrieved June 27, 2026.; "Match Report – Group H – Uruguay v. Spain". FIFA. June 27, 2026. Retrieved June 27, 2026.; "Post match summary report – Group H – Uruguay v. Spain". FIFA. June 27, 2026. Retrieved June 27, 2026.)	Baena 42'

Estadio Akron, Zapopan
Attendance: 45,065
Referee: Ismail Elfath (United States)

Uruguay	Spain

GK	23	Fernando Muslera		(substituted off) 46'
RB	13	Guillermo Varela	(yellow card) 58'
CB	3	Sebastián Cáceres
CB	16	Mathías Olivera
LB	25	Juan Manuel Sanabria	(yellow card) 54'	(substituted off) 70'
DM	5	Manuel Ugarte		(substituted off) 45'
CM	6	Rodrigo Bentancur
CM	8	Federico Valverde (c)		(substituted off) 56'
RF	14	Agustín Canobbio	(red card) 90+4'
CF	9	Darwin Núñez
LF	20	Maximiliano Araújo
Substitutions:
MF	7	Nicolás de la Cruz	(yellow card) 90+3'	(substituted on) 45'
GK	1	Sergio Rochet		(substituted on) 46'
FW	21	Federico Viñas		(substituted on) 56'
MF	18	Brian Rodríguez		(substituted on) 70'
Manager:
(Argentina) Marcelo Bielsa

GK	23	Unai Simón
RB	5	Marcos Llorente
CB	22	Pau Cubarsí
CB	14	Aymeric Laporte
LB	24	Marc Cucurella
DM	16	Rodri (c)
CM	6	Mikel Merino		(substituted off) 60'
CM	20	Pedri		(substituted off) 60'
RF	19	Lamine Yamal		(substituted off) 76'
CF	21	Mikel Oyarzabal		(substituted off) 76'
LF	15	Álex Baena	(yellow card) 46'	(substituted off) 66'
Substitutions:
MF	10	Dani Olmo		(substituted on) 60'
MF	8	Fabián Ruiz		(substituted on) 60'
MF	11	Yéremy Pino		(substituted on) 66'
FW	17	Nico Williams		(substituted on) 76'
FW	7	Ferran Torres		(substituted on) 76'
Manager:
Luis de la Fuente

Man of the Match:
Álex Baena (Spain)

Assistant referees:
Corey Parker (United States)
Kyle Atkins (United States)
Fourth official:
Juan Gabriel Calderón (Costa Rica)
Reserve assistant referee:
Juan Carlos Mora (Costa Rica)
Video assistant referee:
Tatiana Guzmán (Nicaragua)
Assistant video assistant referee:
Armando Villarreal (United States)
Support video assistant referee:
Khamis Al-Marri (Qatar)

== Discipline ==
The team conduct ("fair play") score would have been used as a tiebreaker if the head-to-head and overall records of teams were tied. It would also be used as a tiebreaker for the third-place ranking between groups if the overall records of teams were tied. The score was calculated based on yellow and red cards received by players and team officials in all group matches as follows:

- yellow card: −1 point;
- indirect red card (second yellow card): −3 points;
- direct red card: −4 points;
- yellow card and direct red card: −5 points;

Only one of the above deductions could be applied to a player or team official in a single match.

Team	Match 1				Match 2				Match 3				Score
Team	Yellow card	(yellow card) (yellow-red card)	Red card	(yellow card) (red card)	Yellow card	(yellow card) (yellow-red card)	Red card	(yellow card) (red card)	Yellow card	(yellow card) (yellow-red card)	Red card	(yellow card) (red card)	Score
Spain	1								1				−2
Cape Verde	1				2				1				−4
Saudi Arabia	1				2				3				−6
Uruguay					2				3		1		−9
