= 2026 FIFA World Cup Group E =

FIFA World Cup group

Group E of the 2026 FIFA World Cup took place from June 14 to 25, 2026. The group consisted of Germany, Curaçao, Ivory Coast, and Ecuador.

Four-time world champions Germany finally secured their place in the round of 32 after failing to progress past the group stage in the last two tournaments, 2018 and 2022. Ivory Coast finished as runners-up, progressing to the knockout stage for the first time.

In an upset victory, Ecuador defeated Germany in their last group game, finishing third and advancing as one of the eight best third-place teams.

However, the three teams performed poorly in the round of 32 and were eliminated from the World Cup. World Cup debutants Curaçao finished last with a single point and were eliminated.

== Teams ==
Draw position	Team	Pot	Confederation	Method of qualification	Date of qualification	Finals appearance	Last appearance	Previous best performance	FIFA Rankings	
Draw position	Team	Pot	Confederation	Method of qualification	Date of qualification	Finals appearance	Last appearance	Previous best performance	November 2025 (Note: The rankings of November 2025 were used for seeding for the final draw.)	June 2026
E1	Germany (Note: Germany competed between 1951 and 1990 as West Germany.)	1	UEFA	UEFA Group A winner	November 17, 2025	21st	2022	Winner (1954, 1974, 1990, 2014)	9	10
E2	Curaçao	4	CONCACAF	CONCACAF Group B winner	November 18, 2025	1st	—	—	82	82
E3	Ivory Coast	3	CAF	CAF Group F winner	October 14, 2025	4th	2014	Group stage (2006, 2010, 2014)	42	33
E4	Ecuador	2	CONMEBOL	CONMEBOL round robin runner-up	June 10, 2025	5th	2022	Round of 16 (2006)	23	23

== Standings ==
Pos	Team	Pld	W	D	L	GF	GA	GD	Pts	Qualification
1	Germany	3	2	0	1	10	4	+6	6 (Note: Head-to-head result: Germany 2–1 Ivory Coast.)	Advance to knockout stage
2	Ivory Coast	3	2	0	1	4	2	+2	6	Advance to knockout stage
3	Ecuador	3	1	1	1	2	2	0	4	Advance to knockout stage
4	Curaçao	3	0	1	2	1	9	−8	1	

Source: FIFA
Rules for classification: Group stage tiebreakers
Notes:

In the round of 32:

- The winner of Group E, Germany, advanced to play the third-place team of Group D, Paraguay.
- The runner-up of Group E, Ivory Coast, advanced to play the runner-up of Group I, Norway.
- The third-place team of Group E, Ecuador, advanced to play the winner of Group A, Mexico, as one of the eight best third-place teams from the group stage.

== Matches ==
All times listed are local.

=== Germany vs Curaçao ===
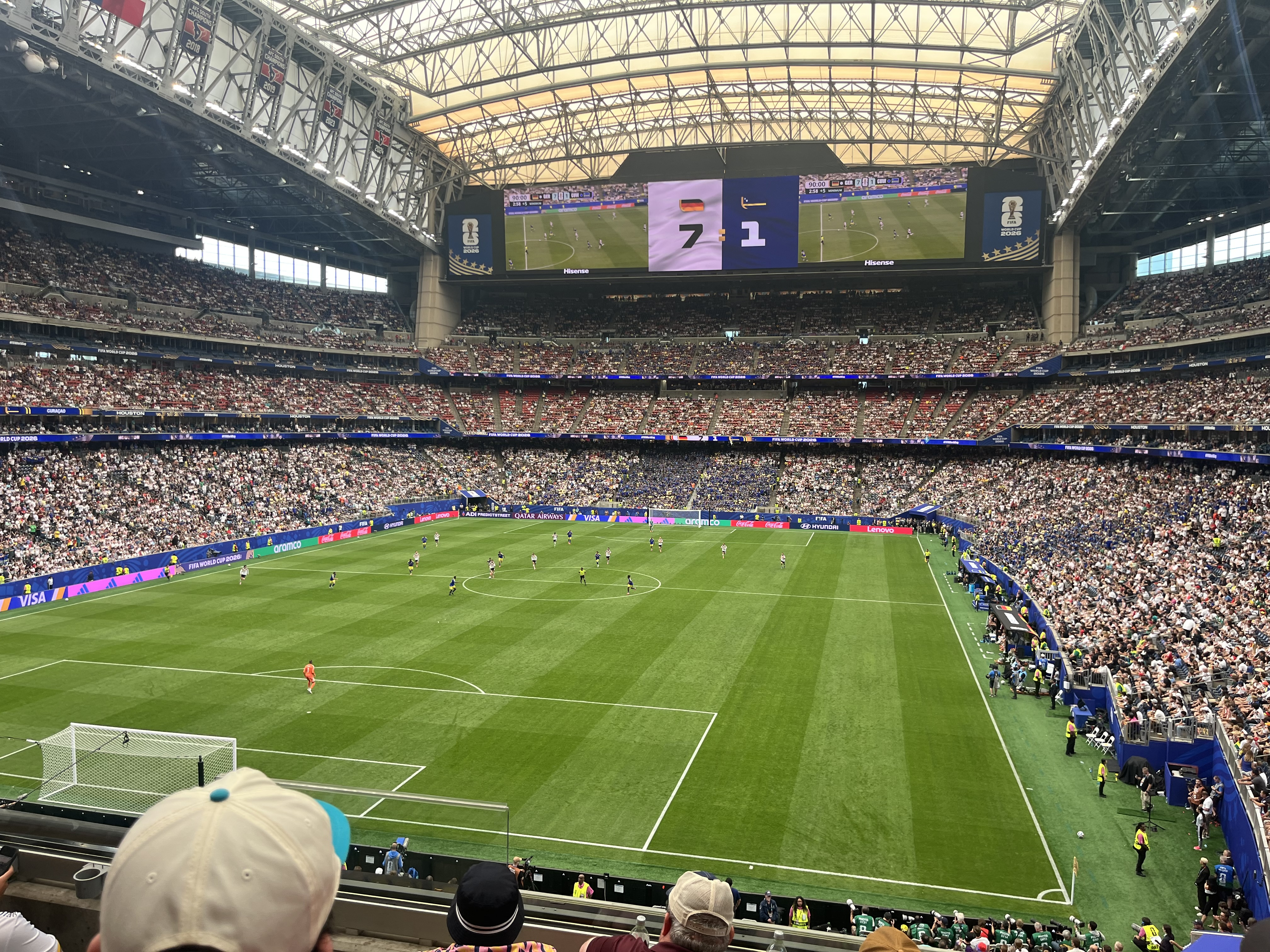
NRG Stadium in Houston during a Group E match between Germany and Curaçao

The two sides had never met before.

The fixture marked Curaçao's FIFA World Cup debut, making it the smallest country by population ever to qualify for the tournament. Moreover, Livano Comenencia scored Curaçao's first-ever goal in the tournament.

Germany's seven goals were the most they scored in a World Cup match since 2014, when they also defeated Brazil 7–1 in the semi-final.

June 14, 2026
12:00 p.m. UTC−5

Germany	7–1	Curaçao
Nmecha 6'; Schlotterbeck 38'; Havertz 45+5' (pen.), 88'; Musiala 47'; Brown 68'; Undav 78'	(Note: "Germany vs Curaçao | First Stage | FIFA World Cup 2026". FIFA. Retrieved June 14, 2026.; "Match Report – Group E – Germany v. Curaçao". FIFA. June 14, 2026. Retrieved June 14, 2026.; "Post match summary report – Group E – Germany v. Curaçao". FIFA. June 15, 2026. Retrieved June 25, 2026.)	Comenencia 21'

NRG Stadium, Houston
Attendance: 68,021
Referee: Jalal Jayed (Morocco)

Germany	Curaçao

GK	1	Manuel Neuer
CB	6	Joshua Kimmich (c)	(substituted off) 83'
CB	4	Jonathan Tah	(substituted off) 72'
CB	15	Nico Schlotterbeck
RM	23	Felix Nmecha	(substituted off) 72'
CM	10	Jamal Musiala	(substituted off) 64'
CM	5	Aleksandar Pavlović
LM	18	Nathaniel Brown	(substituted off) 72'
RF	19	Leroy Sané
CF	7	Kai Havertz
LF	17	Florian Wirtz
Substitutions:
FW	26	Deniz Undav	(substituted on) 64'
DF	22	David Raum	(substituted on) 72'
DF	2	Antonio Rüdiger	(substituted on) 72'
MF	8	Leon Goretzka	(substituted on) 72'
DF	3	Waldemar Anton	(substituted on) 83'
Manager:
Julian Nagelsmann

GK	1	Eloy Room
RB	5	Sherel Floranus
CB	23	Riechedly Bazoer
CB	18	Armando Obispo
LB	24	Deveron Fonville
DM	10	Leandro Bacuna (c)
CM	8	Livano Comenencia
CM	21	Tahith Chong	(substituted off) 82'
RF	12	Sontje Hansen	(substituted off) 46'
CF	9	Jürgen Locadia	(substituted off) 65'
LF	7	Juninho Bacuna
Substitutions:
FW	11	Jeremy Antonisse	(substituted on) 46'
FW	16	Jearl Margaritha	(substituted on) 65'
FW	19	Gervane Kastaneer	(substituted on) 82'
Manager:
(Netherlands) Dick Advocaat

Man of the Match:
Kai Havertz (Germany)

Assistant referees:
Zakaria Brinsi (Morocco)
Mostafa Akarkad (Morocco)
Fourth official:
Abongile Tom (South Africa)
Reserve assistant referee:
Zakhele Siwela (South Africa)
Video assistant referee:
Hamza El-Fariq (Morocco)
Assistant video assistant referee:
Nicolás Gallo (Colombia)
Support video assistant referee:
Shaun Evans (Australia)

=== Ivory Coast vs Ecuador ===
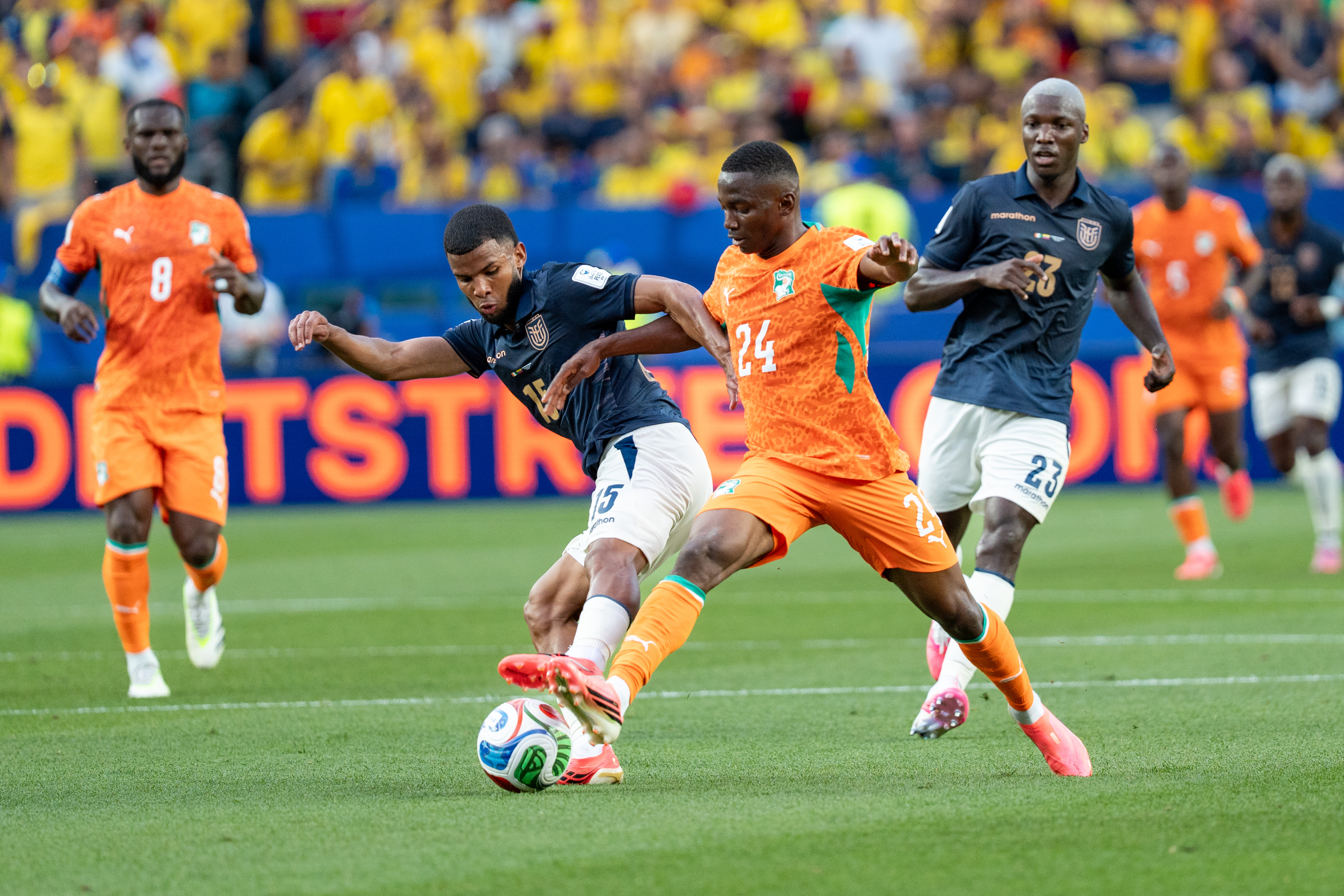
Midway in the match between Ivory Coast and Ecuador

The two teams had never met before.

With a goal by Amad Diallo in the 90th minute, this marked Ivory Coast's first victory against a CONMEBOL team in the FIFA World Cup since their 2–1 loss to Colombia in 2014.

June 14, 2026
7:00 p.m. UTC−4

Ivory Coast	1–0	Ecuador
Diallo 90'	(Note: "Côte d'Ivoire vs Ecuador | First Stage | FIFA World Cup 2026". FIFA. Retrieved June 14, 2026.; "Match Report – Group E – Côte d'Ivoire v. Ecuador". FIFA. June 15, 2026. Retrieved June 15, 2026.; "Post match summary report – Group E – Côte d'Ivoire v. Ecuador". FIFA. June 14, 2026. Retrieved June 15, 2026.)

Lincoln Financial Field, Philadelphia
Attendance: 68,274
Referee: François Letexier (France) (Note: Michael Oliver (England) was originally appointed to the Ivory Coast vs Ecuador match, but he pulled out due to a minor injury.)

Ivory Coast	Ecuador

GK	1	Yahia Fofana
RB	17	Guéla Doué	(yellow card) 40'	(substituted off) 89'
CB	5	Wilfried Singo
CB	20	Emmanuel Agbadou
LB	3	Ghislain Konan
RM	11	Yan Diomande
CM	8	Franck Kessié (c)	(yellow card) 38'
CM	6	Seko Fofana	(yellow card) 28'	(substituted off) 77'
LM	24	Bazoumana Touré		(substituted off) 56'
CF	19	Nicolas Pépé		(substituted off) 77'
CF	12	Elye Wahi		(substituted off) 56'
Substitutions:
FW	9	Ange-Yoan Bonny		(substituted on) 56'
FW	15	Amad Diallo		(substituted on) 56'
MF	18	Ibrahim Sangaré		(substituted on) 77'
MF	26	Christ Inao Oulaï		(substituted on) 77'
DF	7	Odilon Kossounou		(substituted on) 89'
Manager:
Emerse Faé

GK	1	Hernán Galíndez
RCB	4	Joel Ordóñez
CB	6	Willian Pacho
LCB	3	Piero Hincapié
RM	14	Alan Minda		(substituted off) 56'
CM	21	Alan Franco		(substituted off) 62'
CM	23	Moisés Caicedo
LM	15	Pedro Vite
RF	19	Gonzalo Plata
CF	13	Enner Valencia (c)		(substituted off) 77'
LF	9	John Yeboah		(substituted off) 62'
Substitutions:
FW	20	Nilson Angulo		(substituted on) 56'
DF	17	Ángelo Preciado		(substituted on) 62'
DF	25	Jackson Porozo	(yellow card) 73'	(substituted on) 62'
FW	11	Kevin Rodríguez		(substituted on) 77'
Manager:
(Argentina) Sebastián Beccacece

Man of the Match:
Yan Diomande (Ivory Coast)

Assistant referees:
Cyril Mugnier (France)
Mehdi Rahmouni (France)
Fourth official:
Khalid Al-Turais (Saudi Arabia)
Reserve assistant referee:
Mohammed Al-Bakry (Saudi Arabia)
Video assistant referee:
Jarred Gillett (England)
Assistant video assistant referee:
Willy Delajod (France)
Support video assistant referee:
Bram Van Driessche (Belgium)

=== Germany vs Ivory Coast ===
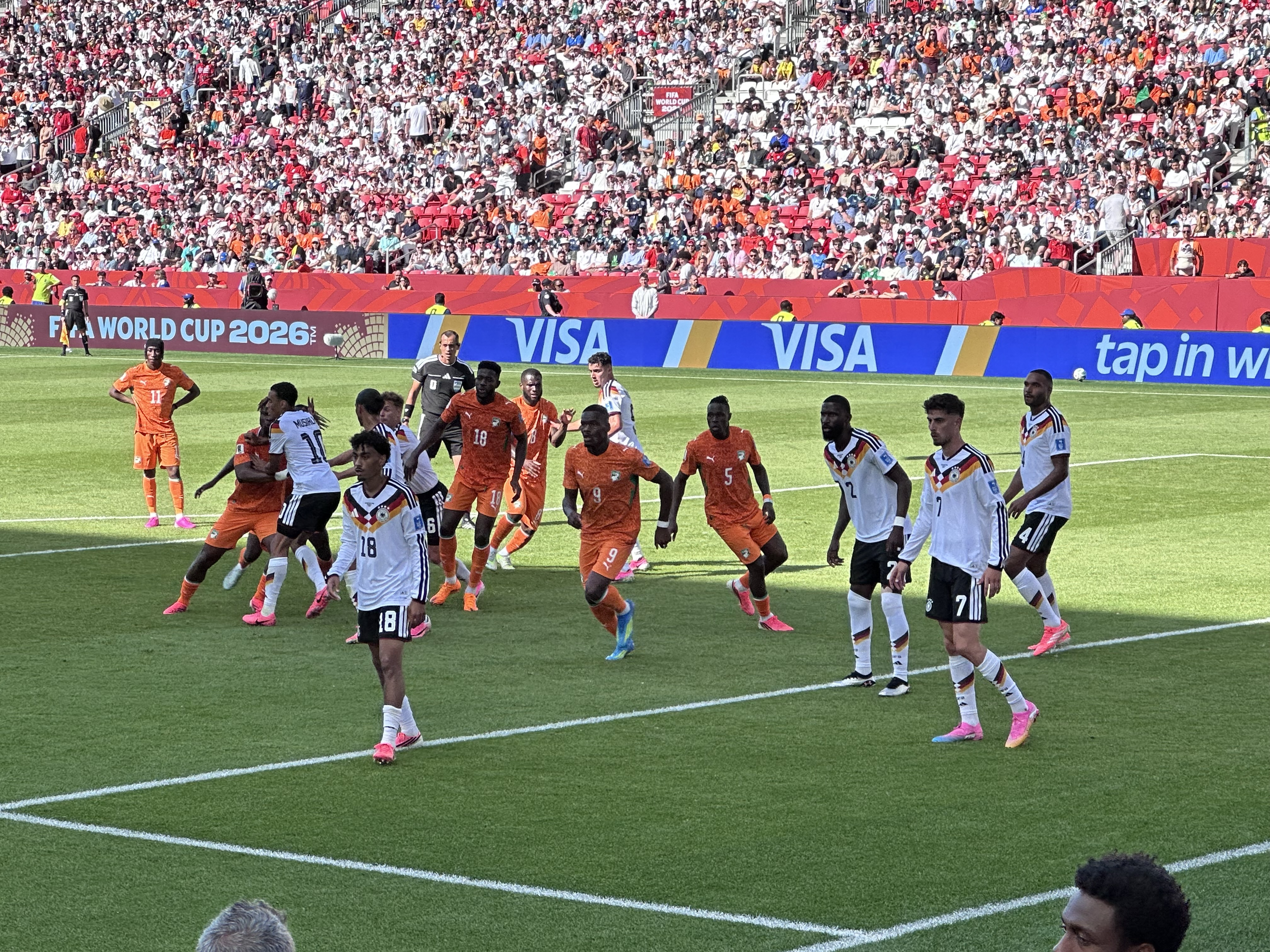
Set piece between Germany and Ivory Coast

The teams have previously faced each other once, in a 2009 friendly match that ended in a 2–2 draw.

With two goals from Deniz Undav, this marked the very first time that Germany managed to get through the Group Stage for the very first time since having been eliminated from the group stage, both in 2018 and 2022.

June 20, 2026
4:00 p.m. UTC−4

Germany	2–1	Ivory Coast
Undav 68', 90+4'	(Note: "Germany vs Côte d'Ivoire | First Stage | FIFA World Cup 2026". FIFA. Retrieved June 20, 2026.; "Match Report – Group E – Germany v. Côte d'Ivoire". FIFA. June 20, 2026. Retrieved June 20, 2026.; "Post match summary report – Group E – Germany v. Côte d'Ivoire". FIFA. June 20, 2026. Retrieved June 20, 2026.)	Kessié 30'

BMO Field, Toronto
Attendance: 43,036
Referee: Juan Gabriel Benítez (Paraguay)

Germany	Ivory Coast

GK	1	Manuel Neuer
RB	6	Joshua Kimmich (c)
CB	4	Jonathan Tah
CB	15	Nico Schlotterbeck	(substituted off) 46'
LB	18	Nathaniel Brown
CM	23	Felix Nmecha
CM	5	Aleksandar Pavlović	(substituted off) 60'
RW	19	Leroy Sané	(substituted off) 60'
AM	10	Jamal Musiala	(substituted off) 60'
LW	17	Florian Wirtz
CF	7	Kai Havertz	(substituted off) 85'
Substitutions:
DF	2	Antonio Rüdiger	(substituted on) 46'
MF	9	Jamie Leweling	(substituted on) 60'
MF	20	Nadiem Amiri	(substituted on) 60'
FW	26	Deniz Undav	(substituted on) 60'
MF	8	Leon Goretzka	(substituted on) 85'
Manager:
Julian Nagelsmann

GK	1	Yahia Fofana
RB	5	Wilfried Singo	(substituted off) 82'
CB	7	Odilon Kossounou
CB	20	Emmanuel Agbadou
LB	3	Ghislain Konan
DM	18	Ibrahim Sangaré	(substituted off) 75'
CM	8	Franck Kessié (c)
CM	26	Christ Inao Oulaï
RF	15	Amad Diallo	(substituted off) 75'
CF	9	Ange-Yoan Bonny	(substituted off) 75'
LF	11	Yan Diomande	(substituted off) 85'
Substitutions:
MF	6	Seko Fofana	(substituted on) 75'
FW	10	Simon Adingra	(substituted on) 75'
FW	22	Evann Guessand	(substituted on) 75'
DF	17	Guéla Doué	(substituted on) 82'
FW	19	Nicolas Pépé	(substituted on) 85'
Manager:
Emerse Faé

Man of the Match:
Deniz Undav (Germany)

Assistant referees:
Eduardo Cardozo (Paraguay)
Milcíades Saldívar (Paraguay)
Fourth official:
Khalid Al-Turais (Saudi Arabia)
Reserve assistant referee:
Mohammed Al-Bakry (Saudi Arabia)
Video assistant referee:
Antonio García (Uruguay)
Assistant video assistant referee:
Guillermo Pacheco (Mexico)
Support video assistant referee:
Juan Soto (Venezuela)

=== Ecuador vs Curaçao ===
The two teams had never met before. This was the first time Curaçao earned a point at the World Cup, as well as finishing the match with a draw.

June 20, 2026
7:00 p.m. UTC−5

Ecuador	0–0	Curaçao
	(Note: "Ecuador vs Curaçao | First Stage | FIFA World Cup 2026". FIFA. Retrieved June 21, 2026.; "Match Report – Group E – Ecuador v. Curaçao". FIFA. June 21, 2026. Retrieved June 21, 2026.; "Post match summary report – Group E – Ecuador v. Curaçao". FIFA. June 21, 2026. Retrieved June 21, 2026.)

Arrowhead Stadium, Kansas City
Attendance: 68,598
Referee: Ma Ning (China)

Ecuador	Curaçao

GK	1	Hernán Galíndez
CB	21	Alan Franco		(substituted off) 83'
CB	6	Willian Pacho
CB	3	Piero Hincapié
RM	9	John Yeboah		(substituted off) 89'
CM	23	Moisés Caicedo
CM	5	Jordy Alcívar	(yellow card) 38'	(substituted off) 46'
CM	15	Pedro Vite
LM	7	Pervis Estupiñán		(substituted off) 71'
CF	19	Gonzalo Plata
CF	13	Enner Valencia (c)
Substitutions:
FW	11	Kevin Rodríguez		(substituted on) 46'
FW	20	Nilson Angulo		(substituted on) 71'
DF	17	Ángelo Preciado		(substituted on) 83'
FW	16	Jordy Caicedo		(substituted on) 89'
Manager:
(Argentina) Sebastián Beccacece

GK	1	Eloy Room
CB	3	Juriën Gaari	(yellow card) 75'
CB	18	Armando Obispo
CB	5	Sherel Floranus
RWB	20	Joshua Brenet
LWB	24	Deveron Fonville		(substituted off) 75'
CM	8	Livano Comenencia	(yellow card) 56'	(substituted off) 83'
CM	10	Leandro Bacuna (c)	(yellow card) 39'
CM	21	Tahith Chong		(substituted off) 75'
CF	9	Jürgen Locadia		(substituted off) 83'
CF	7	Juninho Bacuna	(yellow card) 53'	(substituted off) 75'
Substitutions:
DF	4	Roshon van Eijma		(substituted on) 75'
FW	16	Jearl Margaritha		(substituted on) 75'
FW	14	Kenji Gorré		(substituted on) 75'
MF	6	Godfried Roemeratoe		(substituted on) 83'
FW	19	Gervane Kastaneer	(yellow card) 90+1'	(substituted on) 83'
Manager:
(Netherlands) Dick Advocaat

Man of the Match:
Eloy Room (Curaçao)

Assistant referees:
Zhou Fei (China)
Saud Al-Maqaleh (Qatar)
Fourth official:
Campbell-Kirk Kawana-Waugh (New Zealand)
Reserve assistant referee:
Isaac Trevis (New Zealand)
Video assistant referee:
Fu Ming (China)
Assistant video assistant referee:
Marco Di Bello (Italy)
Support video assistant referee:
Tomasz Kwiatkowski (Poland)

=== Curaçao vs Ivory Coast ===
The two teams had never met before.

With this result, Ivory Coast qualified for the knockout stage of a World Cup for the first time as the Group E runners-up, while Curaçao was ultimately eliminated from the group stage, finishing bottom as a result.

June 25, 2026
4:00 p.m. UTC−4

Curaçao	0–2	Ivory Coast
	(Note: "Curaçao vs Côte d'Ivoire | First Stage | FIFA World Cup 2026". FIFA. Retrieved June 25, 2026.; "Match Report – Group E – Curaçao v. Côte d'Ivoire". FIFA. June 25, 2026. Retrieved June 25, 2026.; "Post match summary report – Group E – Curaçao v. Côte d'Ivoire". FIFA. June 25, 2026. Retrieved June 27, 2026.)	Pépé 7', 64'

Lincoln Financial Field, Philadelphia
Attendance: 68,324
Referee: Glenn Nyberg (Sweden)

Curaçao	Ivory Coast

GK	1	Eloy Room
CB	3	Juriën Gaari		(substituted off) 77'
CB	18	Armando Obispo
CB	24	Deveron Fonville		(substituted off) 77'
RWB	20	Joshua Brenet		(substituted off) 90'
LWB	5	Sherel Floranus
RM	21	Tahith Chong
CM	8	Livano Comenencia		(substituted off) 61'
CM	10	Leandro Bacuna (c)
LM	7	Juninho Bacuna	(yellow card) 75'
CF	9	Jürgen Locadia		(substituted off) 90'
Substitutions:
FW	11	Jeremy Antonisse		(substituted on) 61'
FW	19	Gervane Kastaneer	(yellow card) 83'	(substituted on) 77'
MF	13	Tyrese Noslin		(substituted on) 77'
DF	2	Shurandy Sambo		(substituted on) 90'
FW	17	Brandley Kuwas		(substituted on) 90'
Manager:
(Netherlands) Dick Advocaat

GK	1	Yahia Fofana
RB	17	Guéla Doué
CB	7	Odilon Kossounou
CB	2	Ousmane Diomande
LB	13	Christopher Opéri
DM	18	Ibrahim Sangaré
CM	19	Nicolas Pépé	(yellow card) 34'	(substituted off) 67'
CM	8	Franck Kessié (c)		(substituted off) 77'
RF	15	Amad Diallo		(substituted off) 46'
CF	9	Ange-Yoan Bonny		(substituted off) 67'
LF	11	Yan Diomande		(substituted off) 67'
Substitutions:
MF	26	Christ Inao Oulaï		(substituted on) 46'
FW	12	Elye Wahi		(substituted on) 67'
FW	24	Bazoumana Touré		(substituted on) 67'
FW	14	Oumar Diakité		(substituted on) 67'
MF	4	Jean Michaël Seri		(substituted on) 77'
Manager:
Emerse Faé

Man of the Match:
Nicolas Pépé (Ivory Coast)

Assistant referees:
Mahbod Beigi (Sweden)
Andreas Söderkvist (Sweden)
Fourth official:
Sandro Schärer (Switzerland)
Reserve assistant referee:
Stéphane De Almeida (Switzerland)
Video assistant referee:
Carlos del Cerro Grande (Spain)
Assistant video assistant referee:
Leodán González (Uruguay)
Support video assistant referee:
Juan Soto (Venezuela)

=== Ecuador vs Germany ===
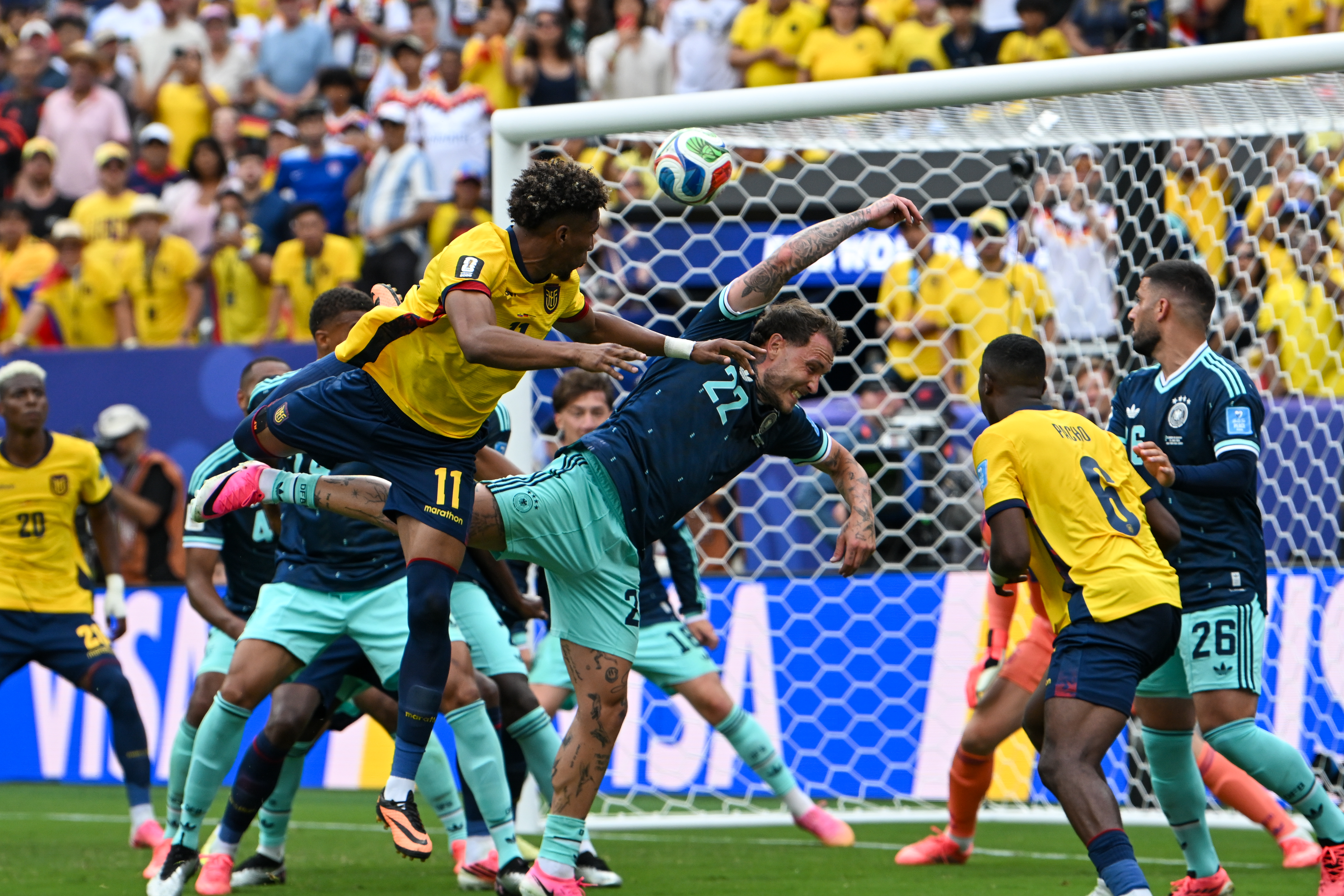
During the match between Ecuador and Germany.

Germany had won the teams' two previous meetings: a 3–0 group stage victory at the 2006 FIFA World Cup (which they hosted) and a 4–2 friendly in 2013.

During the match, total attendance for the tournament reached 3,605,357 spectators. This surpassed the previous record of 3,587,538, which had been held for 32 years by the 1994 FIFA World Cup, also hosted in the United States. The record was broken with 44 matches remaining in the tournament.

Regarded as an upset victory, this was Germany's first group-stage loss since their 2–1 defeat to Japan in 2022.

June 25, 2026
4:00 p.m. UTC−4

Ecuador	2–1	Germany
Angulo 9'; Plata 77'	(Note: "Ecuador vs Germany | First Stage | FIFA World Cup 2026". FIFA. Retrieved June 25, 2026.; "Match Report – Group E – Ecuador v. Germany". FIFA. June 25, 2026. Retrieved June 25, 2026.; "Post match summary report – Group E – Ecuador v. Germany". FIFA. June 25, 2026. Retrieved June 27, 2026.)	Sané 2'

MetLife Stadium, East Rutherford
Attendance: 80,663
Referee: Tori Penso (United States)

Ecuador	Germany

GK	1	Hernán Galíndez
RB	21	Alan Franco	(yellow card) 50'	(substituted off) 64'
CB	4	Joel Ordóñez
CB	6	Willian Pacho
LB	3	Piero Hincapié	(yellow card) 43'	(substituted off) 71'
RM	9	John Yeboah		(substituted off) 85'
CM	23	Moisés Caicedo (c)
CM	15	Pedro Vite
LM	20	Nilson Angulo		(substituted off) 85'
CF	19	Gonzalo Plata	(yellow card) 89'
CF	13	Enner Valencia		(substituted off) 64'
Substitutions:
FW	11	Kevin Rodríguez		(substituted on) 64'
DF	17	Ángelo Preciado		(substituted on) 64'
DF	7	Pervis Estupiñán		(substituted on) 71'
FW	16	Jordy Caicedo		(substituted on) 85'
DF	2	Félix Torres		(substituted on) 85'
Manager:
(Argentina) Sebastián Beccacece

GK	1	Manuel Neuer
RB	6	Joshua Kimmich (c)		(substituted off) 60'
CB	4	Jonathan Tah
CB	2	Antonio Rüdiger
LB	22	David Raum
CM	23	Felix Nmecha		(substituted off) 64'
CM	5	Aleksandar Pavlović	(yellow card) 44'	(substituted off) 46'
RW	19	Leroy Sané
AM	10	Jamal Musiala
LW	17	Florian Wirtz		(substituted off) 73'
CF	7	Kai Havertz		(substituted off) 60'
Substitutions:
MF	16	Angelo Stiller		(substituted on) 46'
FW	26	Deniz Undav		(substituted on) 60'
DF	24	Malick Thiaw		(substituted on) 60'
FW	14	Maximilian Beier		(substituted on) 64'
DF	13	Pascal Groß		(substituted on) 73'
Manager:
Julian Nagelsmann

Man of the Match:
Nilson Angulo (Ecuador)

Assistant referees:
Brooke Mayo (United States)
Kathryn Nesbitt (United States)
Fourth official:
Campbell-Kirk Kawana-Waugh (New Zealand)
Reserve assistant referee:
Isaac Trevis (New Zealand)
Video assistant referee:
Joe Dickerson (United States)
Assistant video assistant referee:
Fu Ming (China)
Support video assistant referee:
Khamis Al-Marri (Qatar)

== Discipline ==
The team conduct ("fair play") score would have been used as a tiebreaker if the head-to-head and overall records of teams were tied. It would also be used as a tiebreaker for the third-place ranking between groups if the overall records of teams were tied. The score was calculated based on yellow and red cards received by players and team officials in all group matches as follows:

- yellow card: −1 point;
- indirect red card (second yellow card): −3 points;
- direct red card: −4 points;
- yellow card and direct red card: −5 points;

Only one of the above deductions could be applied to a player or team official in a single match.

Team	Match 1				Match 2				Match 3				Score
Team	Booked	(yellow card) (yellow-red card)	Sent off (straight red)	(yellow card) (red card)	Booked	(yellow card) (yellow-red card)	Sent off (straight red)	(yellow card) (red card)	Booked	(yellow card) (yellow-red card)	Sent off (straight red)	(yellow card) (red card)	Score
Germany									1				–1
Ivory Coast	3								1				−4
Ecuador	1				1				3				−5
Curaçao					5				2				−7
