= Mehdi Rahmouni =

French football referee (born 1988)

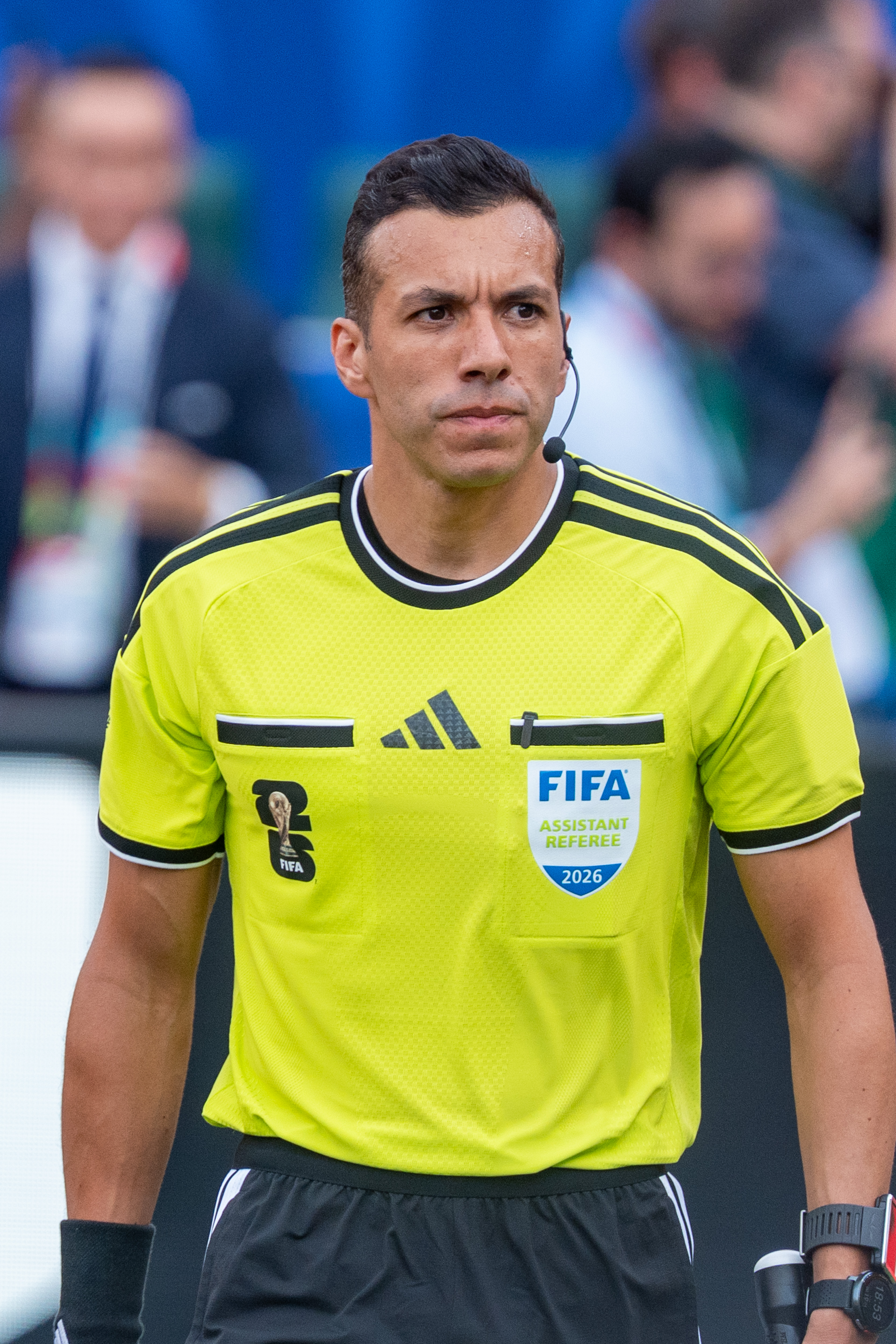
- Rahmouni in 2026
- Born: 26 October 1988 (age 37); Bastia, Corsica

Domestic
Years	League	Role
2017–present	Ligue 1	Assistant referee

International
Years	League	Role
2018–present	FIFA listed	Assistant referee

Mehdi Rahmouni (born 26 October 1988) is a French football assistant referee who has been listed on the FIFA International Referees List since 2018.

== Career ==
Rahmouni was born in 1988 in Bastia, Haute-Corse, Corsica. At the age of four, he moved to Manduel, in the department of Gard. Rahmouni played football in local leagues and began his refereeing career at the age of 15. When playing football and refereeing at the same time resulted in interpersonal conflicts with those who were players of rival teams, Rahmouni made the decision to pursue refereeing only.

He began as a pitch referee but switched to focus on being an assistant referee after a match at the women's Division 1 between Montpellier and OL Lyonnes. Rahmouni gradually ascended through French leagues, reaching the Ligue 1 in January 2017.

Following his designation as a FIFA referee in 2018, Rahmouni has overseen games in numerous UEFA tournaments, including the UEFA Euro 2024, where he was selected as an assistant referee for the final between Spain and England at Olympiastadion in Berlin. He assisted French referee François Letexier, with whom he has worked in several competitions. That same year, Rahmouni served as an assistant referee at the men's tournament of the Summer Olympics in Paris, also assisting Letexier.

On 20 April 2025, during a Ligue 1 match between AS Saint-Étienne and Lyon, Rahmouni was struck in the head by a coin thrown from the stands. Letexier immediately suspended the match and led the teams off the pitch while Rahmouni received medical attention from Lyon's medical team. This incident halted the game for around 40 minutes before the match was permitted to resume. The fan responsible was later arrested.

He served as an assistant referee at the 2026 UEFA Europa League final between SC Freiburg and Aston Villa F.C. in Istanbul. In April 2026, Rahmouni was appointed to the 2026 FIFA World Cup in North America, forming part of the French team led by Letexier and along assistant referee Cyril Mugnier.

== Personal life ==
He is married and had two children.

== Selected performances ==
2026 FIFA World Cup – North America
Date	Match	Result	Round	Venue
14 June 2026	Ivory Coast – Ecuador	1–0	Group stage	Lincoln Financial Field, Philadelphia
26 June 2026	Cape Verde – Saudi Arabia	0–0	Group stage	NRG Stadium, Houston
7 July 2026	Argentina – Egypt	3–2	Round of 16	Mercedes-Benz Stadium, Atlanta
