= Gabriel Chade =

Argentine football referee (born 1980)

- Chade at the 2026 FIFA World Cup
- Born: 22 August 1980 (age 46); Chilecito, La Rioja Province, Argentina

Domestic
Years	League	Role
2015–present	Argentine Primera División	Assistant referee

International
Years	League	Role
2016–present	FIFA listed	Assistant referee

Gabriel Chade (born 22 August 1980) is an Argentine football assistant referee who has been listed on the FIFA International Referees List since 2016.

== Career ==
Chade was born in Chilecito, La Rioja Province, Argentina, in August 1980. Growing up in an inner and small place in La Rioja Province, Chade frequently speaks about the hardships that he faced to become a successful referee due to living so far away from any strong football hub of Argentina. He began his career in refereeing after an injury to his back did not allow him to continue playing football.

Chade said that he decided to pursue professional refereeing by happenstance after he began going to trainings of a friend who was a referee in Chilecito's local league. Chade stated in an interview with La Red La Rioja in April 2026 that this decision "changed his life overnight."

In 2015, Chade ascended to the Argentine Primera División, where he became a prominent assistant referee. After obtaining his FIFA badge in 2016, Chade began taking part in numerous international tournaments like CONMEBOL's Copa Sudamericana and Copa Libertadores, as well as the 2021 Copa América in Brazil. Outside CONMEBOL, Chade served as an assistant referee at other confederations' competitions, including the 2021 FIFA Arab Cup and the UEFA Euro 2024.

Chade took part in other international and inter-confederation tournaments. In 2019, he was assigned to the 2019 FIFA U-20 World Cup in Poland and made his debut at the senior competition at the 2022 FIFA World Cup in Qatar. In Qatar, Chade served in three matches, including a quarter-final match between Morocco and Portugal. He was also appointed to the 2025 FIFA Club World Cup in the United States.

In April 2026, Chade was selected for the 2026 FIFA World Cup, making this his second participation in the seniors' FIFA World Cup. He was appointed along with his fellow assistant referee Juan Pablo Belatti, who was a linesman in the 2018 FIFA World Cup final and is the most active assistant referee at FIFA World Cups.
