= Jun Mihara =

Japanese football referee (born 1981)

Jun Mihara 三原純
- Born: June 16, 1981 (age 45); Matsue, Shimane Prefecture, Japan
- Other occupation: Civil servant

Domestic
Years	League	Role
2013–present	J1 League	Assistant referee

International
Years	League	Role
2017–present	FIFA listed	Assistant referee

Jun Mihara (Japanese: 三原純, Hepburn: Mihara Jun; born June 16, 1981) is a Japanese football assistant referee and video assistant referee who has been listed on the FIFA International Referees List since 2017.

== Career ==
Mihara was born in Matsue, Shimane Prefecture, Japan, and began playing football while he studied at the Shimane Prefectural Matsue Higashi High School. During his university years, Mihara continued playing football and gained experience in refereeing. Shortly afterwards, he dropped out of college and returned to Matsue, working for the city's government. After obtaining a referee certification, Mihara was promoted to the school of refereeing of the Japan Football Association (JFA) in 2010. He graduated as a professional referee in December 2011. Mihara took inspiration from watching the 1998 FIFA World Cup.

Since his graduation from the JFA in 2011, Mihara has served in the J.League, where he pursued a career as an assistant referee. In 2017, Mihara obtained his FIFA badge and took part in his first international game in the 2017 AFC Cup. He was also selected to oversee games at the 2023 FIFA U-20 World Cup in Argentina, serving under referee Yusuke Araki. Mihara also took part in the second leg match between Iraq and the UAE during the AFC fifth round qualifier to the 2026 FIFA World Cup. He was subsequently appointed to the 2026 FIFA World Cup in North America, serving as an assistant referee to pitch referee Araki.

Mihara was chosen as the best assistant referee of 2025 in the J. League and continues to work as a civil servant in Matsue.
