= Zakhele Siwela =

South African referee

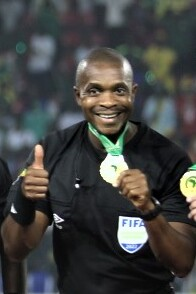
- Siwela at the final of the 2022 Africa Cup of Nations
- Full name: Zakhele Thusi Granville Siwela
- Born: 2 September 1992 (age 34)

International
Years	League	Role

Zakhele Thusi Granville Siwela (born 2 September 1982) is an international football referee from South Africa who has been a listed international referee for FIFA since 2010.

== Refereeing ==
He officiated at the 2018 and 2022 FIFA World Cup.

In 2025 he was appointed an assistant referee at the 2025 AFCON.
