= Japan at the FIFA World Cup =

International football delegation

Japan have appeared in the FIFA World Cup on eight occasions, the first being in 1998 where they lost all three group games and finished in 31st position. Masashi Nakayama scored Japan's first ever goal in a World Cup match against Jamaica on 26 June 1998 in a 2–1 defeat. Keisuke Honda became the first Japanese player to score in three World Cups: 2010, 2014, 2018.

In 2018, Japan became the first ever Asian nation to beat a side from South America, after they won 2–1 against Colombia in the group stage. Japan made their seventh appearance at the finals at the 2022 tournament in Qatar. The team has progressed reached the Round of 16 on four occasions, 2002 (as joint-hosts), 2010, 2018, 2022.

== FIFA World Cup record ==
FIFA World Cup record										Qualification record					
Year	Result	Position	Pld	W	D	L	GF	GA	Squad	Pld	W	D	L	GF	GA
(Uruguay) 1930	Withdrew									Qualified as invitees					
(Italy) 1934	Did not enter									Did not enter					
(France) 1938	Withdrew									Withdrew					
(Brazil) 1950	Suspended from FIFA									Suspended from FIFA					
(Switzerland) 1954	Did not qualify									2	0	1	1	3	7
(Sweden) 1958	Did not enter									Did not enter					
(Chile) 1962	Did not qualify									2	0	0	2	1	4
(England) 1966	Did not enter									Did not enter					
(Mexico) 1970	Did not qualify									4	0	2	2	4	8
(West Germany) 1974	Did not qualify									4	1	0	3	5	4
(Argentina) 1978	Did not qualify									4	0	1	3	0	5
(Spain) 1982	Did not qualify									4	2	0	2	4	2
(Mexico) 1986	Did not qualify									8	5	1	2	15	5
(Italy) 1990	Did not qualify									6	2	3	1	7	3
(United States) 1994	Did not qualify									13	9	3	1	35	6
(France) 1998	Group stage	31st	3	0	0	3	1	4	Squad	15	9	5	1	51	12
(South Korea) (Japan) 2002	Round of 16	9th	4	2	1	1	5	3	Squad	Qualified as co-hosts					
(Germany) 2006	Group stage	28th	3	0	1	2	2	7	Squad	12	11	0	1	25	5
(South Africa) 2010	Round of 16	9th	4	2	1	1	4	2	Squad	14	8	4	2	23	9
(Brazil) 2014	Group stage	29th	3	0	1	2	2	6	Squad	14	8	3	3	30	8
(Russia) 2018	Round of 16	15th	4	1	1	2	6	7	Squad	18	13	3	2	44	7
(Qatar) 2022	Round of 16	9th	4	2	1	1	5	4	Squad	18	15	1	2	58	6
(Canada) (Mexico) (United States) 2026	Round of 32	21st	4	1	2	1	8	5	Squad	14	12	2	0	48	2
(Spain) (Portugal) (Morocco) 2030	To be determined									To be determined					
(Saudi Arabia) 2034	To be determined									To be determined					
Total: 8/23	Round of 16	9th	29	8	8	13	33	38	—	152	95	29	28	353	93

== List of matches ==
World Cup	Round	Opponent	Score	Result	Japan goalscorers
1998	Group H	Argentina	0–1	L	
1998	Group H	Croatia	0–1	L	
1998	Group H	Jamaica	1–2	L	Nakayama
2002	Group H	Belgium	2–2	D	Suzuki, Inamoto
2002	Group H	Russia	1–0	W	Inamoto
2002	Group H	Tunisia	2–0	W	Morishima, Nakata
2002	Round of 16	Turkey	0–1	L	
2006	Group F	Australia	1–3	L	S. Nakamura
2006	Group F	Croatia	0–0	D	
2006	Group F	Brazil	1–4	L	Tamada
2010	Group E	Cameroon	1–0	W	Honda
2010	Group E	Netherlands	0–1	L	
2010	Group E	Denmark	3–1	W	Honda, Endō, Okazaki
2010	Round of 16	Paraguay	0–0 (a.e.t.) (3–5 p)	D	
2014	Group C	Ivory Coast	1–2	L	Honda
2014	Group C	Greece	0–0	D	
2014	Group C	Colombia	1–4	L	Okazaki
2018	Group H	Colombia	2–1	W	Kagawa, Osako
2018	Group H	Senegal	2–2	D	Inui, Honda
2018	Group H	Poland	0–1	L	
2018	Round of 16	Belgium	2–3	L	Haraguchi, Inui
2022	Group E	Germany	2–1	W	Dōan, Asano
2022	Group E	Costa Rica	0–1	L	
2022	Group E	Spain	2–1	W	Dōan, Tanaka
2022	Round of 16	Croatia	1–1 (a.e.t.) (1–3 p)	D	Maeda
2026	Group F	Netherlands	2–2	D	K. Nakamura, Kamada
2026	Group F	Tunisia	4–0	W	Kamada, Ueda (2), Itō
2026	Group F	Sweden	1–1	D	Maeda
2026	Round of 32	Brazil	1–2	L	Sano

=== 1998 FIFA World Cup ===
==== Group Stage ====
Pos	Team	Pld	W	D	L	GF	GA	GD	Pts	Qualification
1	Argentina	3	3	0	0	7	0	+7	9	Advance to knockout stage
2	Croatia	3	2	0	1	4	2	+2	6	Advance to knockout stage
3	Jamaica	3	1	0	2	3	9	−6	3	
4	Japan	3	0	0	3	1	4	−3	0	

Source: FIFA
14 June 1998
14:30 CEST (UTC+2)

Argentina	1–0	Japan
Batistuta 28'

Stade de Toulouse, Toulouse
Attendance: 33,500
Referee: Mario van der Ende (Netherlands)

20 June 1998
14:30 CEST (UTC+2)

Japan	0–1	Croatia
		Šuker 77'

Stade de la Beaujoire, Nantes
Attendance: 35,500
Referee: Ramesh Ramdhan (Trinidad and Tobago)

26 June 1998
16:00 CEST (UTC+2)

Japan	1–2	Jamaica
Nakayama 74'		Whitmore 39', 54'

Stade de Gerland, Lyon
Attendance: 39,100
Referee: Günter Benkö (Austria)

=== 2002 FIFA World Cup ===
==== Group Stage ====
Pos	Team	Pld	W	D	L	GF	GA	GD	Pts	Qualification
1	Japan (H)	3	2	1	0	5	2	+3	7	Advance to knockout stage
2	Belgium	3	1	2	0	6	5	+1	5	Advance to knockout stage
3	Russia	3	1	0	2	4	4	0	3	
4	Tunisia	3	0	1	2	1	5	−4	1	

Source: FIFA
(H) Hosts
4 June 2002
18:00

Japan	2–2	Belgium
Suzuki 59'; Inamoto 67'		Wilmots 57'; Van der Heyden 75'

Saitama Stadium, Saitama
Attendance: 55,256
Referee: William Mattus (Costa Rica)

9 June 2002
20:30

Japan	1–0	Russia
Inamoto 51'

International Stadium Yokohama, Yokohama
Attendance: 66,108
Referee: Markus Merk (Germany)

14 June 2002
15:30

Tunisia	0–2	Japan
		Morishima 48'; H. Nakata 75'

Nagai Stadium, Osaka
Attendance: 45,213
Referee: Gilles Veissière (France)

==== Knockout stage ====
Round of 16

18 June 2002
15:30

Japan	0–1	Turkey
		Davala 12'

Miyagi Stadium, Rifu
Attendance: 45,666
Referee: Pierluigi Collina (Italy)

=== 2006 FIFA World Cup ===
==== Group Stage ====
Pos	Team	Pld	W	D	L	GF	GA	GD	Pts	Qualification
1	Brazil	3	3	0	0	7	1	+6	9	Advance to knockout stage
2	Australia	3	1	1	1	5	5	0	4	Advance to knockout stage
3	Croatia	3	0	2	1	2	3	−1	2	
4	Japan	3	0	1	2	2	7	−5	1	

Source: FIFA
12 June 2006
15:00

Australia	3–1	Japan
Cahill 84', 89'; Aloisi 90+2'		Nakamura 26'

Fritz-Walter-Stadion, Kaiserslautern
Attendance: 46,000
Referee: Essam Abd El Fatah (Egypt)

18 June 2006
15:00

Japan	0–0	Croatia

Frankenstadion, Nuremberg
Attendance: 41,000
Referee: Frank De Bleeckere (Belgium)

22 June 2006
21:00

Japan	1–4	Brazil
Tamada 34'		Ronaldo 45+1', 81'; Juninho 53'; Gilberto 59'

Westfalenstadion, Dortmund
Attendance: 65,000
Referee: Éric Poulat (France)

=== 2010 FIFA World Cup ===
==== Group Stage ====
Pos	Team	Pld	W	D	L	GF	GA	GD	Pts	Qualification
1	Netherlands	3	3	0	0	5	1	+4	9	Advance to knockout stage
2	Japan	3	2	0	1	4	2	+2	6	Advance to knockout stage
3	Denmark	3	1	0	2	3	6	−3	3	
4	Cameroon	3	0	0	3	2	5	−3	0	

Source: FIFA
14 June 2010
16:00

Japan	1–0	Cameroon
Honda 39'

Free State Stadium, Bloemfontein
Attendance: 30,620
Referee: Olegário Benquerença (Portugal)

19 June 2010
13:30

Netherlands	1–0	Japan
Sneijder 53'

Moses Mabhida Stadium, Durban
Attendance: 62,010
Referee: Héctor Baldassi (Argentina)

24 June 2010
20:30

Denmark	1–3	Japan
Tomasson 81'		Honda 17'; Endō 30'; Okazaki 87'

Royal Bafokeng Stadium, Rustenburg
Attendance: 27,967
Referee: Jerome Damon (South Africa)

==== Knockout stage ====
Round of 16

29 June 2010
16:00

Paraguay	0–0 (a.e.t.)	Japan
Penalties
Barreto (penalty scored); Barrios (penalty scored); Riveros (penalty scored); Valdez (penalty scored); Cardozo (penalty scored)	5–3	(penalty scored) Endō; (penalty scored) Hasebe; (penalty missed) Komano; (penalty scored) Honda

Loftus Versfeld Stadium, Pretoria
Attendance: 36,742
Referee: Frank De Bleeckere (Belgium)

=== 2014 FIFA World Cup ===
==== Group Stage ====
Pos	Team	Pld	W	D	L	GF	GA	GD	Pts	Qualification
1	Colombia	3	3	0	0	9	2	+7	9	Advance to knockout stage
2	Greece	3	1	1	1	2	4	−2	4	Advance to knockout stage
3	Ivory Coast	3	1	0	2	4	5	−1	3	
4	Japan	3	0	1	2	2	6	−4	1	

Source: FIFA
14 June 2014
22:00 BRT (UTC−3)

Ivory Coast	2–1	Japan
Bony 64'; Gervinho 66'		Honda 16'

Itaipava Arena Pernambuco, Recife
Attendance: 40,267
Referee: Enrique Osses (Chile)

19 June 2014
19:00 BRT (UTC−3)

Japan	0–0	Greece

Arena das Dunas, Natal
Attendance: 39,485
Referee: Joel Aguilar (El Salvador)

24 June 2014
16:00 AMT (UTC−4)

Japan	1–4	Colombia
Okazaki 45+1'		Cuadrado 17' (pen.); Martínez 55', 82'; Rodríguez 90'

Arena Pantanal, Cuiabá
Attendance: 40,340
Referee: Pedro Proença (Portugal)

=== 2018 FIFA World Cup ===
==== Group Stage ====
Pos	Team	Pld	W	D	L	GF	GA	GD	Pts	Qualification
1	Colombia	3	2	0	1	5	2	+3	6	Advance to knockout stage
2	Japan	3	1	1	1	4	4	0	4 (Note: Fair play points: Japan −4, Senegal −6.)	Advance to knockout stage
3	Senegal	3	1	1	1	4	4	0	4	
4	Poland	3	1	0	2	2	5	−3	3	

Source: FIFA
Notes:
19 June 2018
15:00 MSK (UTC+3)

Colombia	1–2	Japan
Quintero 39'		Kagawa 6' (pen.); Osako 73'

Mordovia Arena, Saransk
Attendance: 40,842
Referee: Damir Skomina (Slovenia)

24 June 2018
20:00 YEKT (UTC+5)

Japan	2–2	Senegal
Inui 34'; Honda 78'		Mané 11'; Wagué 71'

Central Stadium, Yekaterinburg
Attendance: 32,572
Referee: Gianluca Rocchi (Italy)

28 June 2018
17:00 MSK (UTC+3)

Japan	0–1	Poland
		Bednarek 59'

Volgograd Arena, Volgograd
Attendance: 42,189
Referee: Janny Sikazwe (Zambia)

==== Knockout stage ====
Round of 16

2 July 2018
21:00 MSK (UTC+3)

Belgium	3–2	Japan
Vertonghen 69'; Fellaini 74'; Chadli 90+4'		Haraguchi 48'; Inui 52'

Rostov Arena, Rostov-on-Don
Attendance: 41,466
Referee: Malang Diedhiou (Senegal)

=== 2022 FIFA World Cup ===
==== Group Stage ====
Pos	Team	Pld	W	D	L	GF	GA	GD	Pts	Qualification
1	Japan	3	2	0	1	4	3	+1	6	Advance to knockout stage
2	Spain	3	1	1	1	9	3	+6	4	Advance to knockout stage
3	Germany	3	1	1	1	6	5	+1	4	
4	Costa Rica	3	1	0	2	3	11	−8	3	

Source: FIFA
Rules for classification: Group stage tiebreakers
23 November 2022
16:00

Germany	1–2	Japan
Gündoğan 33' (pen.)		Dōan 75'; Asano 83'

Khalifa International Stadium, Al Rayyan
Attendance: 42,608
Referee: Iván Barton (El Salvador)

27 November 2022
13:00

Japan	0–1	Costa Rica
		Fuller 81'

Ahmad bin Ali Stadium, Al Rayyan
Attendance: 41,479
Referee: Michael Oliver (England)

1 December 2022
22:00

Japan	2–1	Spain
Dōan 48'; Tanaka 51'		Morata 11'

Khalifa International Stadium, Al Rayyan
Attendance: 44,851
Referee: Victor Gomes (South Africa)

==== Knockout stage ====
Round of 16

5 December 2022
18:00

Japan	1–1 (a.e.t.)	Croatia
Maeda 43'		Perišić 55'
Penalties
Minamino (penalty missed); Mitoma (penalty missed); Asano (penalty scored); Yoshida (penalty missed)	1–3	(penalty scored) Vlašić; (penalty scored) Brozović; (penalty missed) Livaja; (penalty scored) Pašalić

Al Janoub Stadium, Al Wakrah
Attendance: 42,523
Referee: Ismail Elfath (United States)

=== 2026 FIFA World Cup ===
==== Group Stage ====
Pos	Team	Pld	W	D	L	GF	GA	GD	Pts	Qualification
1	Netherlands	3	2	1	0	10	4	+6	7	Advance to knockout stage
2	Japan	3	1	2	0	7	3	+4	5	Advance to knockout stage
3	Sweden	3	1	1	1	7	7	0	4	Advance to knockout stage
4	Tunisia	3	0	0	3	2	12	−10	0	

Source: FIFA
Rules for classification: Group stage tiebreakers
June 14, 2026
3:00 p.m. UTC−5

Netherlands	2–2	Japan
Van Dijk 51'; Summerville 64'	(Note: "Netherlands vs Japan | First Stage | FIFA World Cup 2026". FIFA. Retrieved June 14, 2026.; "Match Report – Group F – Netherlands v. Japan". FIFA. June 14, 2026. Retrieved June 14, 2026.; "Post match summary report – Group F – Netherlands v. Japan". FIFA. June 14, 2026. Retrieved June 15, 2026.)	Nakamura 57'; Kamada 88'

AT&T Stadium, Arlington
Attendance: 69,285
Referee: Ismail Elfath (United States)

June 20, 2026
10:00 p.m. UTC−6

Tunisia	0–4	Japan
	(Note: "Tunisia vs Japan | First Stage | FIFA World Cup 2026". FIFA. Retrieved June 21, 2026.; "Match Report – Group F – Tunisia v. Japan". FIFA. June 21, 2026. Retrieved June 21, 2026.; "Post match summary report – Group F – Tunisia v. Japan". FIFA. June 21, 2026. Retrieved June 25, 2026.)	Kamada 4'; Ueda 31', 83'; J. Itō 69'

Estadio BBVA, Guadalupe
Attendance: 51,243
Referee: István Kovács (Romania)

June 25, 2026
6:00 p.m. UTC−5

Japan	1–1	Sweden
Maeda 56'	(Note: "Japan vs Sweden | First Stage | FIFA World Cup 2026". FIFA. Retrieved June 26, 2026.; "Match Report – Group F – Japan v. Sweden". FIFA. June 26, 2026. Retrieved June 26, 2026.; "Post match summary report – Group F – Japan v. Sweden". FIFA. June 25, 2026. Retrieved June 27, 2026.)	Elanga 62'

AT&T Stadium, Arlington
Attendance: 70,137
Referee: Iván Barton (El Salvador)

==== Knockout stage ====
Round of 32

June 29, 2026
12:00 p.m. UTC−5

Brazil	2–1	Japan
Casemiro 56'; Martinelli 90+5'	(Note: "Brazil vs Japan | Round of 32 | FIFA World Cup 2026". FIFA. Retrieved June 29, 2026.; "Match Report – Round of 32 – Brazil v. Japan". FIFA. June 29, 2026. Retrieved June 29, 2026.; "Post match summary report – Round of 32 – Brazil v. Japan". FIFA. June 30, 2026. Retrieved June 30, 2026.)	Sano 29'

NRG Stadium, Houston
Attendance: 68,777
Referee: Maurizio Mariani (Italy)

== Head-to-head record ==
Opponent	Pld	W	D	L	GF	GA	GD	Win %
Argentina	1	0	0	1	0	1	−1	0.00
Australia	1	0	0	1	1	3	−2	0.00
Belgium	2	0	1	1	4	5	−1	0.00
Brazil	2	0	0	2	2	6	−4	0.00
Cameroon	1	1	0	0	1	0	+1	100.00
Colombia	2	1	0	1	3	5	−2	50.00
Costa Rica	1	0	0	1	0	1	−1	0.00
Croatia	3	0	2	1	1	2	−1	0.00
Denmark	1	1	0	0	3	1	+2	100.00
Germany	1	1	0	0	2	1	+1	100.00
Greece	1	0	1	0	0	0	+0	0.00
Ivory Coast	1	0	0	1	1	2	−1	0.00
Jamaica	1	0	0	1	1	2	−1	0.00
Netherlands	2	0	1	1	2	3	−1	0.00
Paraguay	1	0	1	0	0	0	+0	0.00
Poland	1	0	0	1	0	1	−1	0.00
Russia	1	1	0	0	1	0	+1	100.00
Senegal	1	0	1	0	2	2	+0	0.00
Spain	1	1	0	0	2	1	+1	100.00
Sweden	1	0	1	0	1	1	+0	0.00
Tunisia	2	2	0	0	6	0	+6	100.00
Turkey	1	0	0	1	0	1	−1	0.00
Total	28	8	8	12	32	36	−4	28.57

== Player records ==
=== Most appearances ===
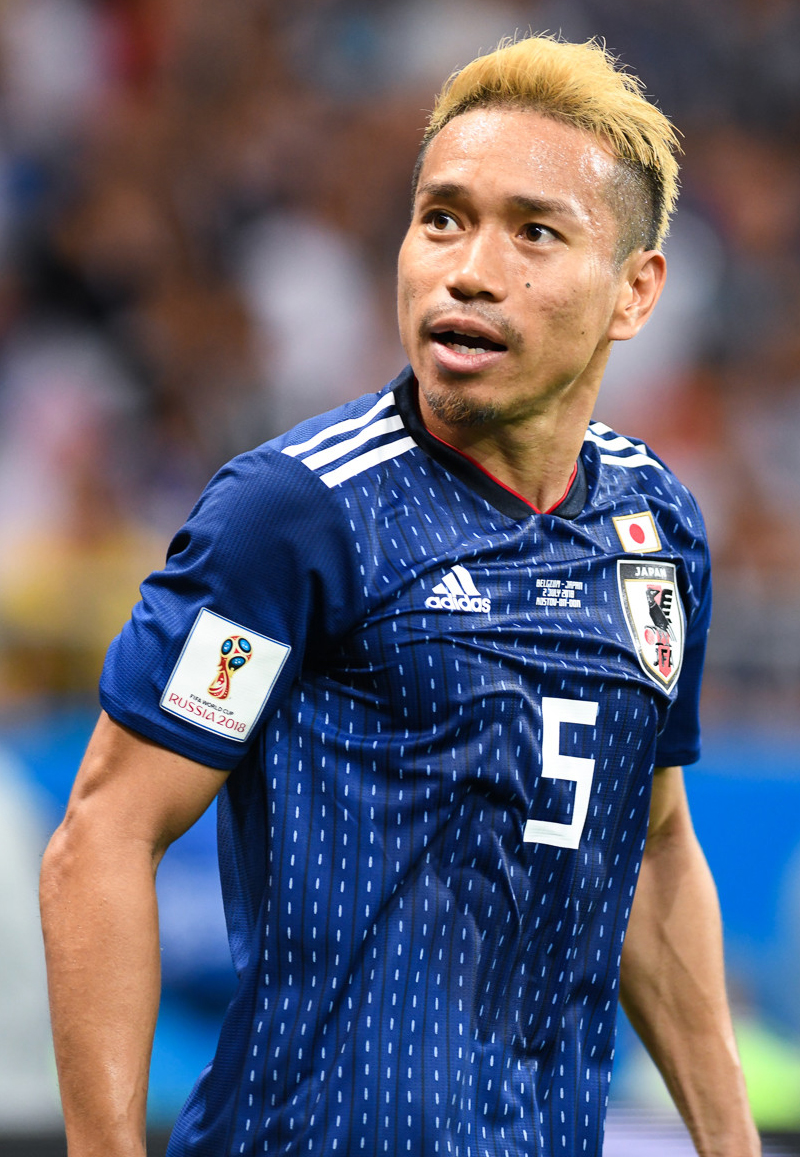
Yūto Nagatomo played in a record five World Cup tournaments and sixteen matches for Japan.

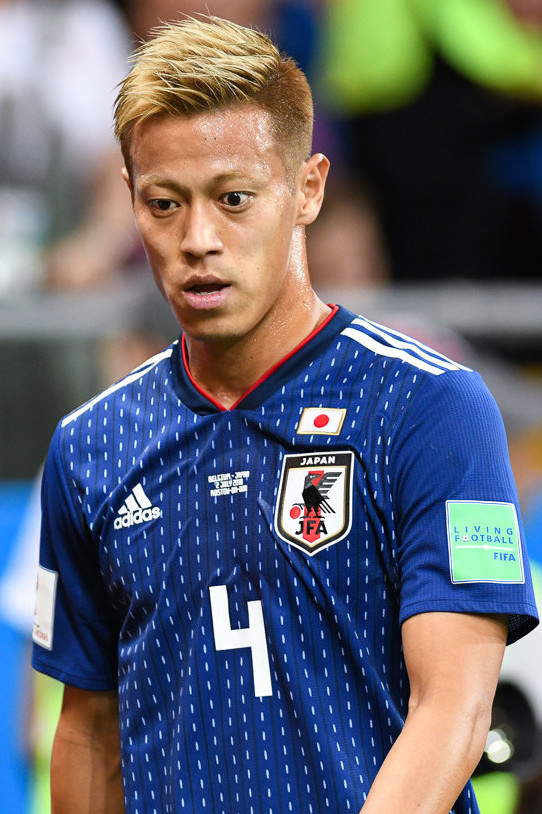
Keisuke Honda is Japan's top scorer in World Cup history with four goals in three tournaments.

Rank	Player	Matches	World Cups
1	Yūto Nagatomo	16	2010, 2014, 2018, 2022 and 2026
2	Makoto Hasebe	11	2010, 2014 and 2018
2	Eiji Kawashima	11	2010, 2014 and 2018
2	Maya Yoshida	11	2014, 2018 and 2022
5	Hidetoshi Nakata	10	1998, 2002 and 2006
5	Shinji Okazaki	10	2010, 2014 and 2018
5	Keisuke Honda	10	2010, 2014 and 2018
8	Junichi Inamoto	8	2002, 2006 and 2010
8	Ritsu Dōan	8	2022 and 2026
8	Junya Itō	8	2022 and 2026
8	Daichi Kamada	8	2022 and 2026

=== Goalscorers ===
On 26 June 1998, Masashi Nakayama made history by scoring Japan's first-ever FIFA World Cup goal; doing so in their match against Jamaica in Lyon.

Player	Goals	1998	2002	2006	2010	2014	2018	2022	2026
Keisuke Honda	4				2	1	1		
Junichi Inamoto	2		2						
Shinji Okazaki	2				1	1			
Takashi Inui	2						2		
Ritsu Dōan	2							2	
Daichi Kamada	2								2
Ayase Ueda	2								2
Daizen Maeda	2							1	1
Masashi Nakayama	1	1							
Takayuki Suzuki	1		1						
Hiroaki Morishima	1		1						
Hidetoshi Nakata	1		1						
Shunsuke Nakamura	1			1					
Keiji Tamada	1			1					
Yasuhito Endō	1				1				
Shinji Kagawa	1						1		
Yuya Osako	1						1		
Genki Haraguchi	1						1		
Takuma Asano	1							1	
Ao Tanaka	1							1	
Keito Nakamura	1								1
Junya Itō	1								1
Kaishū Sano	1								1
Total	33	1	5	2	4	2	6	5	8

== See also ==
- Asian nations at the FIFA World Cup
- Japan at the AFC Asian Cup
- Japan at the Copa América
