= Mauricio Pineda =

Mauricio Pineda may refer to:

- Mauricio Pineda (footballer, born 1975), Argentine defender
- Mauricio Pineda (soccer, born 1997), American midfielder
