= 2006 FIFA World Cup Group F =

Football tournament

Play in Group F of the 2006 FIFA World Cup began on 12 June and completed on 22 June 2006. Brazil won the group and advanced to the round of 16, along with runners-up Australia. Croatia and Japan failed to advance. Australia's win against Japan was the first (and so far only) by a team from the Oceania Football Confederation, having switched to the Asian Football Confederation after the tournament. It was also the only time that a team from the OFC had advanced to the second round of the tournament, as in 1974 Australia went out in the first round.

== Standings ==
Pos	Team	Pld	W	D	L	GF	GA	GD	Pts	Qualification
1	Brazil	3	3	0	0	7	1	+6	9	Advance to knockout stage
2	Australia	3	1	1	1	5	5	0	4	Advance to knockout stage
3	Croatia	3	0	2	1	2	3	−1	2	
4	Japan	3	0	1	2	2	7	−5	1	

Source: FIFA
Rules for classification: Tie-breaking criteria
- Brazil advanced to play Ghana (runners-up of Group E) in the round of 16.
- Australia advanced to play Italy (winner of Group E) in the round of 16.

== Matches ==
All times local (CEST/UTC+2)

=== Australia vs Japan ===
This fixture was Australia's first game in the World Cup finals since 1974. Prior to the game, Japan officials had reportedly suggested that Australia were an aggressive team prone to "dirty tackles".

Japan won against Australia 1–0 in Semifinal 2001 FIFA Confederations Cup.

Australia had the best of the chances early in the first half, with Japan goalkeeper Yoshikatsu Kawaguchi saving twice from Australia striker Mark Viduka in the opening five minutes. In the 25th minute, Kawaguchi performed a fine save from a powerful strike taken by Mark Bresciano.

Shortly after, Japan took the lead in controversial circumstances after 26 minutes when Socceroos keeper Mark Schwarzer was impeded as he was trying to collect Shunsuke Nakamura's cross.

Late in the second half, with Australia pressing forward for an equalizer, Kawaguchi failed to claim a long throw in from Lucas Neill. Substitute Tim Cahill, who was reportedly recovering from knee ligament damage that threatened to rule him out of the tournament, struck the loose ball to score Australia's first World Cup finals goal.

Minutes later, Cahill found space on the edge of the penalty box and struck from long range, with the ball hitting the left post and bouncing into the goal on the right side netting, putting Australia ahead. Deep into injury time, substitute John Aloisi ran through the Japan defence and scored Australia's third goal via a low left-footed strike, sealing Australia's and an Oceanian's team first ever win at the World Cup.

After the game, Australia coach Guus Hiddink expressed delight with the resilience shown by his players, however was adamant that Japan's opening goal should not have stood. Schwarzer revealed that the Egyptian referee Essam Abdel-Fatah had apologised for allowing Japan's opening goal to stand instead of granting a free-kick, and expressed relief that his decision did not affect the final outcome of the game. Japan coach Zico remarked that referees should not have to make such apologies and that FIFA need to sort out such incidents.

This was Japan's third straight failure at winning their opening fixture at the World Cup finals, having lost in 1998 to Argentina 1–0 and drawing in 2002 to Belgium 2–2.

12 June 2006
15:00

Australia	3–1	Japan
Cahill 84', 89'; Aloisi 90+2'		Nakamura 26'

Fritz-Walter-Stadion, Kaiserslautern
Attendance: 46,000
Referee: Essam Abd El Fatah (Egypt)

Australia	Japan

GK	1	Mark Schwarzer
CB	3	Craig Moore	(yellow card) 58'	(substituted off) 61'
CB	2	Lucas Neill
CB	14	Scott Chipperfield
RM	20	Luke Wilkshire		(substituted off) 75'
CM	7	Brett Emerton
CM	13	Vince Grella	(yellow card) 33'
CM	23	Mark Bresciano		(substituted off) 53'
LM	5	Jason Culina
CF	10	Harry Kewell
CF	9	Mark Viduka (c)
Substitutions:
MF	4	Tim Cahill	(yellow card) 69'	(substituted on) 53'
FW	19	Joshua Kennedy		(substituted on) 61'
FW	15	John Aloisi	(yellow card) 78'	(substituted on) 75'
Manager:
(Netherlands) Guus Hiddink

GK	23	Yoshikatsu Kawaguchi
CB	19	Keisuke Tsuboi		(substituted off) 56'
CB	5	Tsuneyasu Miyamoto (c)	(yellow card) 31'
CB	22	Yuji Nakazawa
RM	3	Yūichi Komano
CM	7	Hidetoshi Nakata
CM	15	Takashi Fukunishi
LM	14	Alex
AM	10	Shunsuke Nakamura
CF	9	Naohiro Takahara	(yellow card) 40'
CF	13	Atsushi Yanagisawa		(substituted off) 79'
Substitutions:
DF	2	Teruyuki Moniwa	(yellow card) 68'	(substituted on) 56'	(substituted off) 90+1'
MF	18	Shinji Ono		(substituted on) 79'
FW	16	Masashi Oguro			(substituted on) 90+1'
Manager:
(Brazil) Zico

Man of the Match:
Tim Cahill (Australia)

Assistant referees:
Dramane Danté (Mali)
Mamadou N'Doye (Senegal)
Fourth official:
Éric Poulat (France)
Fifth official:
Vincent Texier (France)

=== Brazil vs Croatia ===
Brazil came into their opening match against Croatia as defending champions, having won their fifth World Cup at the 2002 edition of the tournament, and were favourites to win the tournament.

Just before half-time, Kaká's curling left-footed strike put the Brazilians ahead. With the win, Brazil became the first team in World Cup history to win eight consecutive matches.

13 June 2006
21:00

Brazil	1–0	Croatia
Kaká 44'

Olympiastadion, Berlin
Attendance: 72,000
Referee: Benito Archundia (Mexico)

Brazil	Croatia

GK	1	Dida
RB	2	Cafu (c)
CB	3	Lúcio
CB	4	Juan
LB	6	Roberto Carlos
CM	5	Emerson	(yellow card) 42'
CM	11	Zé Roberto
AM	8	Kaká
AM	10	Ronaldinho
CF	7	Adriano
CF	9	Ronaldo		(substituted off) 70'
Substitutions:
FW	23	Robinho		(substituted on) 70'
Manager:
Carlos Alberto Parreira

GK	1	Stipe Pletikosa
CB	7	Dario Šimić
CB	4	Robert Kovač	(yellow card) 67'
CB	3	Josip Šimunić
RM	2	Darijo Srna
CM	5	Igor Tudor	(yellow card) 90'
CM	10	Niko Kovač (c)	(yellow card) 32'	(substituted off) 41'
LM	8	Marko Babić
AM	19	Niko Kranjčar
CF	17	Ivan Klasnić		(substituted off) 56'
CF	9	Dado Pršo
Substitutions:
MF	16	Jerko Leko		(substituted on) 41'
FW	18	Ivica Olić		(substituted on) 56'
Manager:
Zlatko Kranjčar

Man of the Match:
Kaká (Brazil)

Assistant referees:
José Ramírez (Mexico)
Héctor Vergara (Canada)
Fourth official:
Mohamed Guezzaz (Morocco)
Fifth official:
Brahim Djezzar (Algeria)

=== Japan vs Croatia ===
The last time the two sides met, Croatia defeated Japan 1–0 in the 1998 edition of the tournament in which Croatia went on to finish in third place.

With both teams having lost their opening fixtures, Croatian captain Niko Kovač told the Vecernji List that the fixture was “naše biti ili ne biti” (“our to be or not to be”), with the same outlet reporting for the Japanese the headline “Zico: Presing od prve minute” (“Zico: Pressing from the first minute”).

Croatia's best opportunity to score came mid-way through the first half when Dado Pršo was fouled by defender Tsuneyasu Miyamoto. Darijo Srna stepped up to take the spot kick, but his strike was parried away by Japan goalkeeper Yoshikatsu Kawaguchi.

18 June 2006
15:00

Japan	0–0	Croatia

Frankenstadion, Nuremberg
Attendance: 41,000
Referee: Frank De Bleeckere (Belgium)

Japan	Croatia

GK	23	Yoshikatsu Kawaguchi	(yellow card) 42'
RB	21	Akira Kaji
CB	5	Tsuneyasu Miyamoto (c)	(yellow card) 21'
CB	22	Yuji Nakazawa
LB	14	Alex	(yellow card) 72'
RM	7	Hidetoshi Nakata
CM	15	Takashi Fukunishi		(substituted off) 46'
LM	8	Mitsuo Ogasawara
AM	10	Shunsuke Nakamura
CF	9	Naohiro Takahara		(substituted off) 85'
CF	13	Atsushi Yanagisawa		(substituted off) 61'
Substitutions:
MF	17	Junichi Inamoto		(substituted on) 46'
FW	20	Keiji Tamada		(substituted on) 61'
MF	16	Masashi Oguro		(substituted on) 85'
Manager:
(Brazil) Zico

GK	1	Stipe Pletikosa
CB	7	Dario Šimić
CB	4	Robert Kovač	(yellow card) 32'
CB	3	Josip Šimunić
RM	2	Darijo Srna	(yellow card) 69'	(substituted off) 87'
CM	5	Igor Tudor		(substituted off) 70'
CM	10	Niko Kovač (c)
LM	8	Marko Babić
AM	19	Niko Kranjčar		(substituted off) 78'
CF	17	Ivan Klasnić
CF	9	Dado Pršo
Substitutions:
FW	18	Ivica Olić		(substituted on) 70'
MF	14	Luka Modrić		(substituted on) 78'
FW	22	Ivan Bošnjak		(substituted on) 87'
Manager:
(Croatia) Zlatko Kranjčar

Man of the Match:
Hidetoshi Nakata (Japan)

Assistant referees:
Peter Hermans (Belgium)
Walter Vromans (Belgium)
Fourth official:
Kevin Stott (United States)
Fifth official:
Gregory Barkey (United States)

=== Brazil vs Australia ===
Both teams headed into the fixture having won their opening games. The two teams had met each other 7 times prior, with their most recent game being a 1–0 win to Australia at the 2001 FIFA Confederations Cup.

Australia's well-organised defence frustrated Brazil, who created only one opening in the first half when Ronaldo flicked the ball over his head and into the path of Kaká, whose shot went wide of Australia's goal. Early in the second half, striker Adriano put Brazil ahead with a low strike just outside the penalty box. Despite the setback, Australia pushed forward, with Harry Kewell volleying just over the Brazilian goal, and Mark Bresciano shooting via a bicycle kick which was saved by Dida.

Late in the second half, Brazil substitute Fred scored the second goal for Brazil via a rebound, and the game finished 2–0, securing Brazil's position to the round of 16.

After the final whistle, Harry Kewell complained to referee Markus Merk, alleging that he awarded Brazil so many free kicks that even the Brazilians became embarrassed. FIFA subsequently commenced disciplinary procedures against Kewell, alleging that he repeatedly insulted Merk, but the disciplinary committee eventually cleared Kewell of any wrongdoing.

18 June 2006
18:00

Brazil	2–0	Australia
Adriano 49'; Fred 90'

Allianz Arena, Munich
Attendance: 66,000
Referee: Markus Merk (Germany)

Brazil	Australia

GK	1	Dida
RB	2	Cafu (c)	(yellow card) 29'
CB	3	Lúcio
CB	4	Juan
LB	6	Roberto Carlos
CM	5	Emerson		(substituted off) 72'
CM	11	Zé Roberto
AM	8	Kaká
AM	10	Ronaldinho
CF	7	Adriano		(substituted off) 88'
CF	9	Ronaldo	(yellow card) 31'	(substituted off) 72'
Substitutions:
MF	17	Gilberto Silva		(substituted on) 72'
FW	23	Robinho	(yellow card) 83'	(substituted on) 72'
FW	21	Fred		(substituted on) 88'
Manager:
Carlos Alberto Parreira

GK	1	Mark Schwarzer
CB	3	Craig Moore		(substituted off) 69'
CB	2	Lucas Neill
CB	6	Tony Popovic		(substituted off) 41'
RM	7	Brett Emerton	(yellow card) 13'
CM	13	Vince Grella
LM	14	Scott Chipperfield
RW	5	Jason Culina	(yellow card) 39'
AM	4	Tim Cahill		(substituted off) 56'
LW	21	Mile Sterjovski
CF	9	Mark Viduka (c)
Substitutions:
MF	23	Mark Bresciano		(substituted on) 41'
FW	10	Harry Kewell		(substituted on) 56'
FW	15	John Aloisi		(substituted on) 69'
Manager:
(Netherlands) Guus Hiddink

Man of the Match:
Zé Roberto (Brazil)

Assistant referees:
Christian Schräer (Germany)
Jan-Hendrik Salver (Germany)
Fourth official:
Marco Rodríguez (Mexico)
Fifth official:
Leonel Leal (Costa Rica)

=== Japan vs Brazil ===
Brazil came into the fixture having already qualified for the round of 16, with opening wins against Croatia and Australia. Brazil had come under criticism for lack of flair in their performances, and their star player Ronaldo, who was the top scorer at the previous World Cup, had yet to score and was close to being benched. This fixture was Ronaldo's 17th successive World Cup match, the longest streak by a current player at that time.

Japan took a surprise early lead after 34 minutes against the highly-fancied Brazilians when Keiji Tamada's left-foot strike beat Dida on his near post. Just before half-time, Brazil striker Ronaldo equalized via a close-range header.

After the break, Brazil doubled their advantage via a long-range strike taken by Juninho Pernambucano. Gilberto later scored via an acute angle, and Ronaldo again scored via a long-range strike into the bottom corner to secure a 4–1 victory for Brazil.

With the victory, Brazil completed 10 successive victories at the World Cup. Japan's goal was the first time Brazil had conceded in 461 minutes of football. Ronaldo's 13th and 14th World Cup goals equalled the all-time record of 14 set by West Germany's Gerd Müller, and he also became the 20th player to score at three different World Cups.

22 June 2006
21:00

Japan	1–4	Brazil
Tamada 34'		Ronaldo 45+1', 81'; Juninho 53'; Gilberto 59'

Westfalenstadion, Dortmund
Attendance: 65,000
Referee: Éric Poulat (France)

Japan	Brazil

GK	23	Yoshikatsu Kawaguchi
RB	21	Akira Kaji	(yellow card) 40'
CB	19	Keisuke Tsuboi
CB	22	Yuji Nakazawa (c)
LB	14	Alex
RM	8	Mitsuo Ogasawara		(substituted off) 56'
CM	7	Hidetoshi Nakata
CM	17	Junichi Inamoto
LM	10	Shunsuke Nakamura
CF	11	Seiichiro Maki		(substituted off) 60'
CF	20	Keiji Tamada
Substitutions:
DF	6	Kōji Nakata		(substituted on) 56'
FW	9	Naohiro Takahara		(substituted on) 60'	(substituted off) 66'
FW	16	Masashi Oguro			(substituted on) 66'
Manager:
(Brazil) Zico

GK	1	Dida (c)		(substituted off) 82'
RB	13	Cicinho
CB	3	Lúcio
CB	4	Juan
LB	16	Gilberto	(yellow card) 44'
RM	8	Kaká		(substituted off) 71'
CM	19	Juninho
CM	17	Gilberto Silva
LM	10	Ronaldinho		(substituted off) 71'
CF	23	Robinho
CF	9	Ronaldo
Substitutions:
MF	11	Zé Roberto		(substituted on) 71'
MF	20	Ricardinho		(substituted on) 71'
GK	12	Rogério Ceni		(substituted on) 82'
Manager:
Carlos Alberto Parreira

Man of the Match:
Ronaldo (Brazil)

Assistant referees:
Lionel Dagorne (France)
Vincent Texier (France)
Fourth official:
Jerome Damon (South Africa)
Fifth official:
Enock Molefe (South Africa)

=== Croatia vs Australia ===
The fixture was marred by numerous referring mistakes and controversies, resulting in referee Graham Poll being dismissed from the remainder of the tournament. Shortly after, Poll announced his retirement from international football altogether.

In an interview in 2022, former Australia forward John Aloisi recalled the fixture being 'pure chaos'.

With the draw against Croatia, Australia progressed from the group stages of the World Cup for the first time in their history, and coach Guus Hiddink for the third time in his career, after Netherlands in 1998 and South Korea in 2002.

22 June 2006
21:00

Croatia	2–2	Australia
Srna 2'; N. Kovač 56'		Moore 38' (pen.); Kewell 79'

Gottlieb-Daimler-Stadion, Stuttgart
Attendance: 52,000
Referee: Graham Poll (England)

Croatia	Australia

GK	1	Stipe Pletikosa	(yellow card) 70'
CB	7	Dario Šimić	(yellow card) 32' (yellow-red card) 85'
CB	13	Stjepan Tomas		(substituted off) 83'
CB	3	Josip Šimunić	(yellow card) 61' (yellow card) 90' (yellow-red card) 90+3' (Note: Šimunić was given three yellow cards in the match: the referee (Graham Poll) failed to send him off the pitch after the second yellow, only doing so after the third. The original FIFA match report listed all three yellow cards, but was revised shortly after, with the second yellow card (90') not being recorded.)
RM	2	Darijo Srna
CM	5	Igor Tudor	(yellow card) 38'
CM	10	Niko Kovač (c)
LM	8	Marko Babić
AM	19	Niko Kranjčar		(substituted off) 65'
CF	18	Ivica Olić		(substituted off) 74'
CF	9	Dado Pršo
Substitutions:
MF	16	Jerko Leko		(substituted on) 65'
MF	14	Luka Modrić		(substituted on) 74'
FW	17	Ivan Klasnić		(substituted on) 83'
Manager:
Zlatko Kranjčar

GK	18	Zeljko Kalac
CB	3	Craig Moore
CB	2	Lucas Neill
CB	14	Scott Chipperfield		(substituted off) 75'
RM	21	Mile Sterjovski		(substituted off) 71'
CM	13	Vince Grella		(substituted off) 63'
CM	7	Brett Emerton	(yellow card) 81' (yellow-red card) 87'
LM	5	Jason Culina
AM	4	Tim Cahill
AM	10	Harry Kewell
CF	9	Mark Viduka (c)
Substitutions:
FW	15	John Aloisi		(substituted on) 63'
MF	23	Mark Bresciano		(substituted on) 71'
FW	19	Joshua Kennedy		(substituted on) 75'
Manager:
(Netherlands) Guus Hiddink

Man of the Match:
Harry Kewell (Australia)

Assistant referees:
Philip Sharp (England)
Glen Turner (England)
Fourth official:
Kevin Stott (United States)
Fifth official:
Gregory Barkey (United States)

== See also ==
- Australia at the FIFA World Cup
- Brazil at the FIFA World Cup
- Croatia at the FIFA World Cup
- Japan at the FIFA World Cup
