= 2006 Australia national soccer team season =

Australia
2006 season
- Manager: Guus Hiddink; Graham Arnold
Home colours	Away colours

This page summarises the Australia national soccer team fixtures and results in 2006.

== Summary ==
2006 was a historic year for the Men's National Team for a number of reasons. Football Federation Australia had been accepted into the Asian Football Confederation effective from 1 January and played their first fixture as an Asian member on 22 February when they travelled to Manama and defeated Bahrain 3–1 in a 2007 AFC Asian Cup qualification match.

However, the major event of the year was the 2006 FIFA World Cup, and Australia had qualified for the first time since 1974. Prior to the tournament, Australia defeated Greece in a 'farewell' game in front of 95,000 spectators in Melbourne. This was followed by two warm-up games, drawing 1–1 with Netherlands and defeating Liechtenstein 3–1.

On 12 June, Australia defeated Japan 3–1 in their opening game in Kaiserslautern, with Tim Cahill scoring two goals and John Aloisi scoring one in the last eight minutes to claim their first World Cup finals victory. Their goals were the first ever scored by Australia in the World Cup Finals.

Australia met Brazil in their second Group F game in Munich on 18 June. The Australians held Brazil to a 0–0 half-time scoreline before Adriano put Brazil in front and substitute Fred scored to give Brazil a 2–0 win.

On 22 June, Australia faced Croatia in Stuttgart. The final score was 2–2. A goal from Darijo Srna in the second minute put Australia on the back foot. Australia equalised with a penalty goal from Craig Moore in the 38th minute after Croatian defender Stjepan Tomas handballed near the Croatian goal. Niko Kovac gave Croatia a 2–1 lead after half-time before Australia equalised again through Harry Kewell in the 79th minute. Towards the end of the match, referee Graham Poll blew the final whistle at the moment that John Aloisi scored what would have been a winning goal. As Brazil beat Japan 4–1, Australia proceeded to the next round to face Italy.

On 26 June, Australia met Italy in Kaiserslautern. Italy went down to 10 men due to the red card (51') given to Marco Materazzi for a two-footed tackle on Mark Bresciano. Almost three minutes into stoppage time, with the score still at 0–0, a penalty was awarded to Italy when Fabio Grosso fell under a Lucas Neill challenge in the final seconds of the match. Francesco Totti scored from the spot, and the game ended immediately with Australia eliminated. The success achieved at the 2006 World Cup later saw the team named AFC National Team of the Year.

Australia ended the year with their remaining Asian Cup qualifications matches against Bahrain and Kuwait and qualified for the tournament by topping the group.

== Record ==
Type	GP	W	D	L	GF	GA
Friendly matches	5	2	3	0	7	4
World Cup	4	1	1	2	5	6
Asian Cup qualifiers	4	3	0	1	7	3
Total	13	6	4	3	19	13

== Match results ==
=== Friendlies ===
25 May Friendly	Australia	1–0	Greece	Melbourne, Australia
	Skoko 16'	(Report)		Stadium: MCG; Attendance: 95,103; Referee: Mike Riley (England)

4 June Friendly	Netherlands	1–1	Australia	Rotterdam, Netherlands
	van Nistelrooy 9'	(Report)	54' Cahill	Stadium: De Kuip; Attendance: 49,000; Referee: Mike Dean (England)

8 June Friendly	Liechtenstein	1–3	Australia	Ulm, Germany
	Neill 8' (o.g.)	(Report)	20' Sterjovski; 75' Kennedy; 83' Aloisi	Stadium: Donaustadion; Attendance: 5,872; Referee: Wolfgang Stark (Germany)

7 October Friendly	Australia	1–1	Paraguay	Brisbane, Australia
	Popovic 88'	(Report)	90+2' (o.g.) Beauchamp	Stadium: Suncorp Stadium; Attendance: 47,609; Referee: Joji Kashihara (Japan)

14 November Friendly	Australia	1–1	Ghana	London, England
	Aloisi 25' (pen.)	(Report)	75' Agogo	Stadium: Loftus Road; Attendance: 14,379; Referee: Mark Clattenburg (England)

=== World Cup ===
12 June Group Stage	Australia	3–1	Japan	Kaiserslautern, Germany
15:00 CEST	Cahill 84', 89'; Aloisi 90+2'	(Report)	26' Nakamura	Stadium: Fritz Walter Stadion; Attendance: 46,000; Referee: Essam Abd El Fatah (Egypt)

18 June Group Stage	Brazil	2–0	Australia	Munich, Germany
18:00 CEST	Adriano 49'; Fred 90'	(Report)		Stadium: Allianz Arena; Attendance: 66,000; Referee: Markus Merk (Germany)

22 June Group Stage	Croatia	2–2	Australia	Stuttgart, Germany
21:00 CEST	Srna 2'; N. Kovač 56'; Šimić (yellow card) 32' (yellow-red card) 85'; Šimunić (yellow card) 61' (yellow card) 90' (yellow-red card) 90+3' (Note^{1})	(Report)	38' (pen.) Moore; 79' Kewell; Emerton (yellow card) 81' (yellow-red card) 87'	Stadium: Gottlieb-Daimler-Stadion; Attendance: 52,000; Referee: Graham Poll (England)

26 June Round of 16	Italy	1–0	Australia	Kaiserslautern, Germany
17:00 CEST	Totti 90+5' (pen.); Materazzi (red card) 50'	(Report)		Stadium: Fritz Walter Stadion; Attendance: 46,000; Referee: Luis Medina Cantalejo (Spain)

Note ^{1}: Šimunić was given three yellow cards in the match: the referee (Graham Poll) failed to send him off the pitch after the second yellow, and was only red-carded after the third yellow.

=== Asian Cup qualifiers ===
22 February Group Stage	Bahrain	1–3	Australia	Manama, Bahrain
	Ali 35'	[ (Report)]	54' Thompson; 79' Skoko; 88' (pen.) Elrich	Stadium: National Stadium; Attendance: 2,500; Referee: Subkhiddin Mohd Salleh (Malaysia)

16 August Group Stage	Australia	2–0	Kuwait	Sydney, Australia
	Dodd 75'; Petrovski 86'	[ (Report)]		Stadium: Sydney Football Stadium; Attendance: 32,622; Referee: Junjie Huang (China)

6 September Group Stage	Kuwait	2–0	Australia	Kuwait City, Kuwait
	Al Mutairi 55'; Al-Mutwa 60'	[ (Report)]		Stadium: National Stadium; Attendance: 8,000; Referee: Toru Kamikawa (Japan)

11 October Group Stage	Australia	2–0	Bahrain	Sydney, Australia
	Aloisi 17'; Bresciano 23'	(Report)		Stadium: Sydney Football Stadium; Attendance: 37,000; Referee: Fareed Ali Mohamed Al Marzouqi (United Arab Emirates)

== Goal scorers ==
Player	Friendlies	FIFA World Cup	AFC Asian Cup qual.	Total goals
Aloisi	2	1	1	4
Cahill	1	2	–	3
Skoko	1	–	1	2
Bresciano	–	–	1	1
Dodd	–	–	1	1
Elrich	–	–	1	1
Kennedy	1	–	–	1
Kewell	–	1	–	1
Moore	–	1	–	1
Popovic	1	–	–	1
Petrovski	–	–	1	1
Sterjovski	1	–	–	1
Thompson	–	–	1	1
