= Raouf Bouzaiene =

Tunisian footballer (born 1970)

Personal information
- Full name: Raouf Bouzaiene
- Date of birth: 16 August 1970 (age 56)
- Place of birth: Sousse, Tunisia
- Height: 1.74 m (5 ft 8 1/2 in)
- Position: Defender

Senior career*
Years	Team	Apps	(Gls)
1990–1995	Stade Lavallois	130	(22)
1995–1998	Châteauroux	75	(6)
1998–2001	Club Africain	80	(6)
2001–2003	Genoa	47	(1)
2003–2004	Étoile du Sahel	24	(3)
Total		356	(38)

International career
1992–2003	Tunisia	45	(2)
- * Club domestic league appearances and goals

Raouf Bouzaiene (Arabic: رؤوف بوزيان) (born 16 August 1970) is a Tunisian former footballer who played as a left-back.

== Club career ==
Despite born in Sousse, Tunisia, Bouzaiene grew up in Laval where he began professional football in 1990. He also holds French nationality. With Stade lavallois he reached the semi-final of the French Cup in 1993, against Paris Saint-Germain.

== International career ==
Bouzaiene was part of the Tunisian national team at the 2002 World Cup, scoring Tunisia's goal in the 1–1 draw against Belgium.

=== International goals ===
Scores and results list Tunisia's goal tally first.

No	Date	Venue	Opponent	Score	Result	Competition
1.	7 November 1995	Stade Chedly Zouiten, Tunis, Tunisia	Mauritania	2–0	2–1	7 November Tournament
2.	10 June 2002	Ōita Stadium, Ōita, Japan	Belgium	1–1	1–1	2002 FIFA World Cup
