= 2010 FIFA World Cup Group E =

Football tournament group stage

Group E of the 2010 FIFA World Cup began on 14 June and ended on 24 June 2010. The group consisted of the Netherlands, Denmark, Japan and Cameroon. None of these teams had previously met in a World Cup group stage.

Cameroon was the first team to be eliminated in the World Cup, following their 2–1 defeat by Denmark on 19 June 2010. The Netherlands and Japan would then meet again in the same group in the 2026 edition.

== Standings ==
Pos	Team	Pld	W	D	L	GF	GA	GD	Pts	Qualification
1	Netherlands	3	3	0	0	5	1	+4	9	Advance to knockout stage
2	Japan	3	2	0	1	4	2	+2	6	Advance to knockout stage
3	Denmark	3	1	0	2	3	6	−3	3	
4	Cameroon	3	0	0	3	2	5	−3	0	

Source: FIFA
Rules for classification: Tie-breaking criteria
- Netherlands advanced to play Slovakia (runner-up of Group F) in the round of 16.
- Japan advanced to play Paraguay (winner of Group F) in the round of 16.

== Matches ==
All times local (UTC+2)

=== Netherlands vs Denmark ===
14 June 2010
13:30

Netherlands	2–0	Denmark
Agger 46' (o.g.); Kuyt 85'

Soccer City, Johannesburg
Attendance: 83,465
Referee: Stéphane Lannoy (France)

Netherlands	Denmark

GK	1	Maarten Stekelenburg
RB	2	Gregory van der Wiel
CB	3	John Heitinga
CB	4	Joris Mathijsen
LB	5	Giovanni van Bronckhorst (c)
CM	6	Mark van Bommel
CM	8	Nigel de Jong	(yellow card) 44'	(substituted off) 88'
RW	7	Dirk Kuyt
AM	10	Wesley Sneijder
LW	23	Rafael van der Vaart		(substituted off) 67'
CF	9	Robin van Persie	(yellow card) 49'	(substituted off) 77'
Substitutions:
FW	17	Eljero Elia		(substituted on) 67'
MF	20	Ibrahim Afellay		(substituted on) 77'
MF	14	Demy de Zeeuw		(substituted on) 88'
Manager:
Bert van Marwijk

GK	1	Thomas Sørensen
RB	6	Lars Jacobsen
CB	4	Daniel Agger
CB	3	Simon Kjær	(yellow card) 63'
LB	15	Simon Poulsen
RM	20	Thomas Enevoldsen		(substituted off) 56'
CM	2	Christian Poulsen
CM	12	Thomas Kahlenberg		(substituted off) 73'
LM	10	Martin Jørgensen (c)
SS	19	Dennis Rommedahl
CF	11	Nicklas Bendtner		(substituted off) 62'
Substitutions:
MF	8	Jesper Grønkjær		(substituted on) 56'
FW	17	Mikkel Beckmann		(substituted on) 62'
MF	21	Christian Eriksen		(substituted on) 73'
Manager:
Morten Olsen

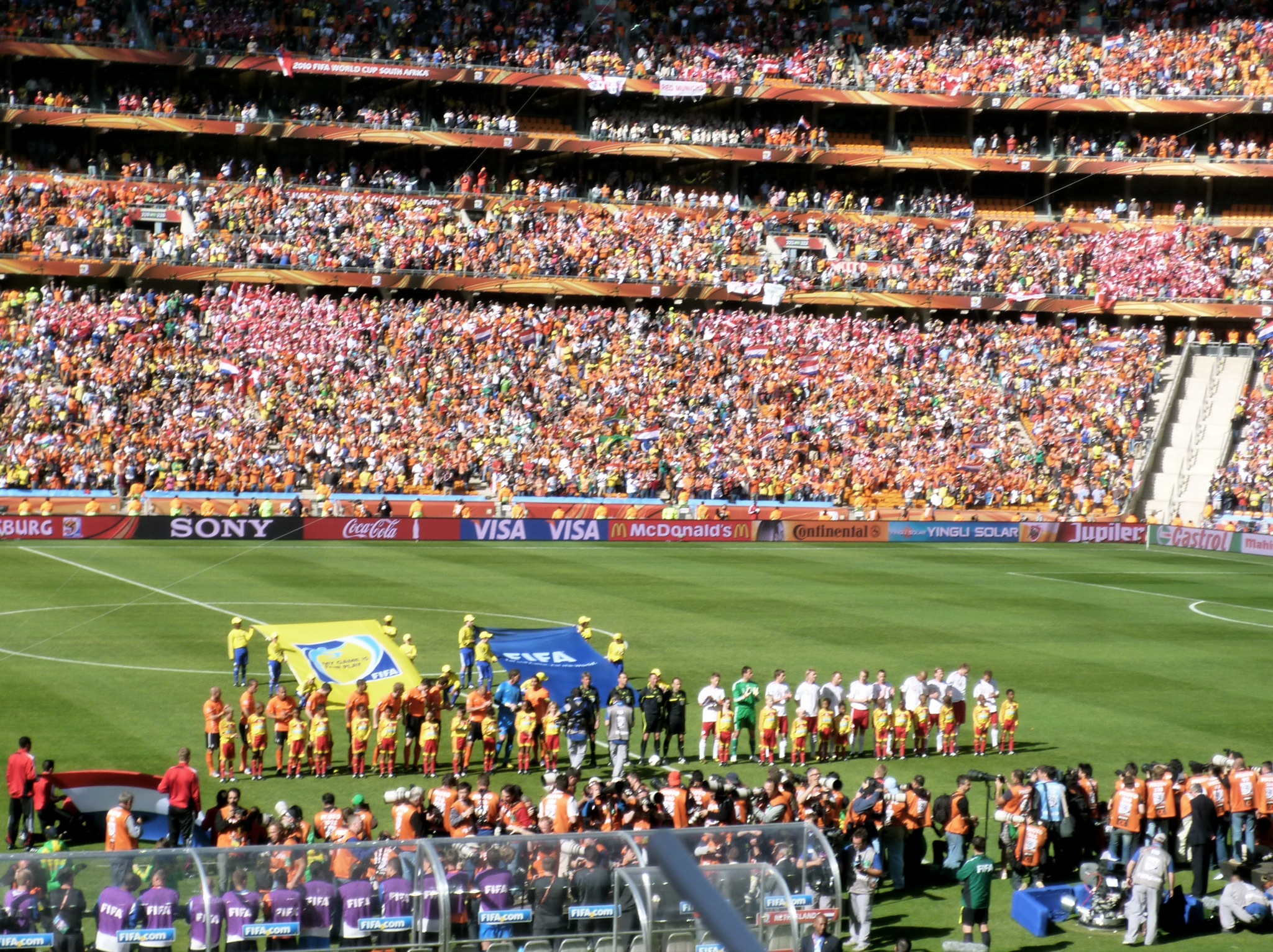
Netherlands vs Denmark

Man of the Match:
Wesley Sneijder (Netherlands)

Assistant referees:
Eric Dansault (France)
Laurent Ugo (France)
Fourth official:
Roberto Rosetti (Italy)
Fifth official:
Paolo Calcagno (Italy)

=== Japan vs Cameroon ===
On the 39th minute, from a surprising Daisuke Matsui cross from the right wing, Keisuke Honda chipped in and delivered home to give Japan the lead, a lead which Japan would successfully defend for the remainder of the match.

The win for Japan was their first World Cup win away from home soil, and it was also the first time Cameroon was defeated in a World Cup opening match. This defeat was a huge shock at the time, due to Japan's poor friendly results and their relatively unknown squad versus to that of Cameroon.

14 June 2010
16:00

Japan	1–0	Cameroon
Honda 39'

Free State Stadium, Bloemfontein
Attendance: 30,620
Referee: Olegário Benquerença (Portugal)

Japan	Cameroon

GK	21	Eiji Kawashima
RB	5	Yuto Nagatomo
CB	22	Yuji Nakazawa
CB	4	Marcus Tulio Tanaka
LB	3	Yūichi Komano
DM	2	Yuki Abe	(yellow card) 90+1'
RM	8	Daisuke Matsui		(substituted off) 69'
CM	18	Keisuke Honda
CM	17	Makoto Hasebe (c)		(substituted off) 88'
LM	7	Yasuhito Endō
CF	16	Yoshito Ōkubo		(substituted off) 82'
Substitutions:
FW	9	Shinji Okazaki		(substituted on) 69'
FW	12	Kisho Yano		(substituted on) 82'
MF	20	Junichi Inamoto		(substituted on) 88'
Manager:
Takeshi Okada

GK	16	Souleymanou Hamidou
RB	19	Stéphane Mbia
CB	3	Nicolas N'Koulou	(yellow card) 72'
CB	5	Sébastien Bassong
LB	2	Benoît Assou-Ekotto
RM	21	Joël Matip		(substituted off) 63'
CM	11	Jean Makoun		(substituted off) 75'
LM	18	Eyong Enoh
RW	9	Samuel Eto'o (c)
LW	13	Eric Maxim Choupo-Moting		(substituted off) 75'
CF	15	Pierre Webó
Substitutions:
MF	10	Achille Emana		(substituted on) 63'
MF	8	Geremi		(substituted on) 75'
FW	17	Mohammadou Idrissou		(substituted on) 75'
Manager:
(France) Paul Le Guen

Man of the Match:
Keisuke Honda (Japan)

Assistant referees:
José Cardinal (Portugal)
Bertino Miranda (Portugal)
Fourth official:
Óscar Ruiz (Colombia)
Fifth official:
Abraham González (Colombia)

=== Netherlands vs Japan ===
The first clear chance of the game came from midfielder Wesley Sneijder when he shot over the bar from a long-range free-kick. When Japan broke up the Netherlands' passing, midfielder Daisuke Matsui was positive, helping a move that set Yuto Nagatomo up for a shot that he hit wide. The Netherlands became frustrated, as they struggled to incorporate forward Robin van Persie. Towards the end of the first half, Japan had two chances: defender Marcus Tulio Tanaka heading wide and Matsui with a powerful shot at the goalkeeper.

Throughout the second half, Van Persie managed to break free twice. In the 52 minute, as the ball came into the penalty area, the Dutch number 9 moved the ball towards Sneijder, who shot the ball powerfully towards the goal, scoring via a deflection from the goalkeeper, Eiji Kawashima. Substitute Shunsuke Nakamura later managed to make a cross into the six-yard box, which was cleared by Van Persie. Dutch substitute Eljero Elia, managed to set up Ibrahim Afellay with a one-on-one with goalkeeper Kawashima, but Kawashima prevented him from scoring a goal. One minute before the end of the game, Shinji Okazaki missed a shot from 10 yards (9.1 m); shooting over the bar. Soon after this, Yuto Nagatomo went down in the penalty area claiming a penalty, from a challenge by Dutch Nigel de Jong, but the referee turned down his appeals.

The result was the Netherlands' second win in the competition, which meant that they would progress to the knockout stage if they did not lose their last match or Cameroon did not defeat Denmark. Cameroon would later on lose to Denmark, which meant that the Dutch were through and Cameroon were out after two matches.

19 June 2010
13:30

Netherlands	1–0	Japan
Sneijder 53'

Moses Mabhida Stadium, Durban
Attendance: 62,010
Referee: Héctor Baldassi (Argentina)

Netherlands	Japan

GK	1	Maarten Stekelenburg
RB	2	Gregory van der Wiel	(yellow card) 36'
CB	3	John Heitinga
CB	4	Joris Mathijsen
LB	5	Giovanni van Bronckhorst (c)
CM	6	Mark van Bommel
CM	8	Nigel de Jong
RW	7	Dirk Kuyt
AM	10	Wesley Sneijder		(substituted off) 83'
LW	23	Rafael van der Vaart		(substituted off) 72'
CF	9	Robin van Persie		(substituted off) 88'
Substitutions:
FW	17	Eljero Elia		(substituted on) 72'
MF	20	Ibrahim Afellay		(substituted on) 83'
FW	21	Klaas-Jan Huntelaar		(substituted on) 88'
Manager:
Bert van Marwijk

GK	21	Eiji Kawashima
RB	3	Yūichi Komano
CB	22	Yuji Nakazawa
CB	4	Marcus Tulio Tanaka
LB	5	Yuto Nagatomo
DM	17	Makoto Hasebe (c)	(substituted off) 77'
CM	2	Yuki Abe
CM	7	Yasuhito Endō
RW	8	Daisuke Matsui	(substituted off) 64'
LW	16	Yoshito Ōkubo	(substituted off) 77'
CF	18	Keisuke Honda
Substitutions:
MF	10	Shunsuke Nakamura	(substituted on) 64'
FW	9	Shinji Okazaki	(substituted on) 77'
FW	11	Keiji Tamada	(substituted on) 77'
Manager:
Takeshi Okada

Man of the Match:
Wesley Sneijder (Netherlands)

Assistant referees:
Ricardo Casas (Argentina)
Hernán Maidana (Argentina)
Fourth official:
Martin Hansson (Sweden)
Fifth official:
Henrik Andrén (Sweden)

=== Cameroon vs Denmark ===
19 June 2010
20:30

Cameroon	1–2	Denmark
Eto'o 10'		Bendtner 33'; Rommedahl 61'

Loftus Versfeld Stadium, Pretoria
Attendance: 38,074
Referee: Jorge Larrionda (Uruguay)

Cameroon	Denmark

GK	16	Souleymanou Hamidou
RB	19	Stéphane Mbia	(yellow card) 75'
CB	3	Nicolas N'Koulou
CB	5	Sébastien Bassong	(yellow card) 49'	(substituted off) 72'
LB	2	Benoît Assou-Ekotto
CM	8	Geremi
CM	18	Eyong Enoh		(substituted off) 46'
RW	6	Alex Song
LW	10	Achille Emana
SS	15	Pierre Webó		(substituted off) 78'
CF	9	Samuel Eto'o (c)
Substitutions:
MF	11	Jean Makoun		(substituted on) 46'
FW	17	Mohammadou Idrissou		(substituted on) 72'
FW	23	Vincent Aboubakar		(substituted on) 78'
Manager:
(France) Paul Le Guen

GK	1	Thomas Sørensen	(yellow card) 86'
RB	6	Lars Jacobsen
CB	3	Simon Kjær	(yellow card) 87'
CB	4	Daniel Agger
LB	15	Simon Poulsen
CM	2	Christian Poulsen
CM	10	Martin Jørgensen		(substituted off) 46'
RW	19	Dennis Rommedahl
AM	9	Jon Dahl Tomasson (c)		(substituted off) 86'
LW	8	Jesper Grønkjær		(substituted off) 67'
CF	11	Nicklas Bendtner
Substitutions:
MF	7	Daniel Jensen		(substituted on) 46'
MF	12	Thomas Kahlenberg		(substituted on) 67'
MF	14	Jakob Poulsen		(substituted on) 86'
Manager:
Morten Olsen

Man of the Match:
Daniel Agger (Denmark)

Assistant referees:
Pablo Fandino (Uruguay)
Mauricio Espinosa (Uruguay)
Fourth official:
Peter O'Leary (New Zealand)
Fifth official:
Brent Best (New Zealand)

=== Denmark vs Japan ===
Japan opened the scoring in the 17th minute from a direct free kick taken by Keisuke Honda – only the second goal scored from a free kick in the tournament. Honda, standing to Danish keeper Thomas Sørensen's left, kicked the ball with great force; Sørensen initially moved to his left, and as the ball sailed past the wall, he shifted direction, but could not recover in time to make the save. Japan's second goal came thirteen minutes later, also from a direct free kick, this time by Yasuhito Endō. Standing outside the penalty area directly in front of the Danish goal, he curled the ball around the wall. Sørensen had been standing on the right side of his goal and could not move to his left fast enough. Endō almost scored from yet another free kick early in the second half. This time, Sørensen appeared to have difficulty judging the path of the ball, and was only able to palm it away at the last second, where it caromed off the goalpost.

Denmark needed to win this game in order to advance and increased their attacks accordingly. Late in the second half, Christian Eriksen put his shot over the goal and Søren Larsen hit the goalpost. They were finally able to score in the 82nd minute. When Makoto Hasebe was adjudged to have fouled Daniel Agger inside the penalty area, Denmark were awarded a penalty kick. Jon Dahl Tomasson took the shot, which was saved by Eiji Kawashima; the goalkeeper, however, was unable to control the rebound, which fell to Tomasson, and he was able to put it in the goal. Japan scored their final goal in the 87th minute. Honda dribbled into the penalty area, forcing Sørensen to attempt to block a potential shot, but Honda passed it to substitute Shinji Okazaki, who merely had to put the ball into an empty net.

The victory was Japan's second World Cup tournament victory on foreign soil, and only their second against a European team. Japan finished group play in second place with six points, and advanced to the knockout round for the second time in their history, and the first time on foreign soil. Denmark ended in third with three points. This was the first time Denmark failed to get past the group stage in the World Cup.

24 June 2010
20:30

Denmark	1–3	Japan
Tomasson 81'		Honda 17'; Endō 30'; Okazaki 87'

Royal Bafokeng Stadium, Rustenburg
Attendance: 27,967
Referee: Jerome Damon (South Africa)

Denmark	Japan

GK	1	Thomas Sørensen
RB	6	Lars Jacobsen
CB	4	Daniel Agger
CB	13	Per Krøldrup	(yellow card) 29'	(substituted off) 56'
LB	15	Simon Poulsen
DM	2	Christian Poulsen	(yellow card) 48'
CM	10	Martin Jørgensen		(substituted off) 34'
CM	12	Thomas Kahlenberg		(substituted off) 63'
AM	9	Jon Dahl Tomasson (c)
AM	19	Dennis Rommedahl
CF	11	Nicklas Bendtner	(yellow card) 66'
Substitutions:
MF	14	Jakob Poulsen		(substituted on) 34'
FW	18	Søren Larsen		(substituted on) 56'
MF	21	Christian Eriksen		(substituted on) 63'
Manager:
Morten Olsen

GK	21	Eiji Kawashima
RB	3	Yūichi Komano
CB	22	Yuji Nakazawa
CB	4	Marcus Tulio Tanaka
LB	5	Yuto Nagatomo	(yellow card) 26'
DM	2	Yuki Abe
CM	8	Daisuke Matsui		(substituted off) 74'
CM	7	Yasuhito Endō	(yellow card) 12'	(substituted off) 90+1'
RW	17	Makoto Hasebe (c)
LW	16	Yoshito Ōkubo		(substituted off) 88'
CF	18	Keisuke Honda
Substitutions:
FW	9	Shinji Okazaki		(substituted on) 74'
DF	15	Yasuyuki Konno		(substituted on) 88'
MF	20	Junichi Inamoto		(substituted on) 90+1'
Manager:
Takeshi Okada

Man of the Match:
Keisuke Honda (Japan)

Assistant referees:
Célestin Ntagungira (Rwanda)
Enock Molefe (South Africa)
Fourth official:
Martin Hansson (Sweden)
Fifth official:
Henrik Andrén (Sweden)

=== Cameroon vs Netherlands ===
24 June 2010
20:30

Cameroon	1–2	Netherlands
Eto'o 65' (pen.)		Van Persie 36'; Huntelaar 83'

Cape Town Stadium, Cape Town
Attendance: 63,093
Referee: Pablo Pozo (Chile)

Cameroon	Netherlands

GK	16	Souleymanou Hamidou
RB	8	Geremi
CB	19	Stéphane Mbia	(yellow card) 81'
CB	3	Nicolas N'Koulou	(yellow card) 25'	(substituted off) 73'
LB	2	Benoît Assou-Ekotto
CM	14	Aurélien Chedjou
CM	7	Landry N'Guémo
RW	11	Jean Makoun
LW	12	Gaëtan Bong		(substituted off) 56'
CF	9	Samuel Eto'o (c)
CF	13	Eric Maxim Choupo-Moting		(substituted off) 72'
Substitutions:
FW	23	Vincent Aboubakar		(substituted on) 56'
FW	17	Mohammadou Idrissou		(substituted on) 72'
DF	4	Rigobert Song		(substituted on) 73'
Manager:
(France) Paul Le Guen

GK	1	Maarten Stekelenburg
RB	12	Khalid Boulahrouz
CB	3	John Heitinga
CB	4	Joris Mathijsen
LB	5	Giovanni van Bronckhorst (c)	(yellow card) 70'
CM	6	Mark van Bommel
CM	8	Nigel de Jong
RW	7	Dirk Kuyt	(yellow card) 17'	(substituted off) 66'
AM	10	Wesley Sneijder
LW	23	Rafael van der Vaart	(yellow card) 65'	(substituted off) 73'
CF	9	Robin van Persie		(substituted off) 59'
Substitutions:
FW	21	Klaas-Jan Huntelaar		(substituted on) 59'
FW	17	Eljero Elia		(substituted on) 66'
FW	11	Arjen Robben		(substituted on) 73'
Manager:
Bert van Marwijk

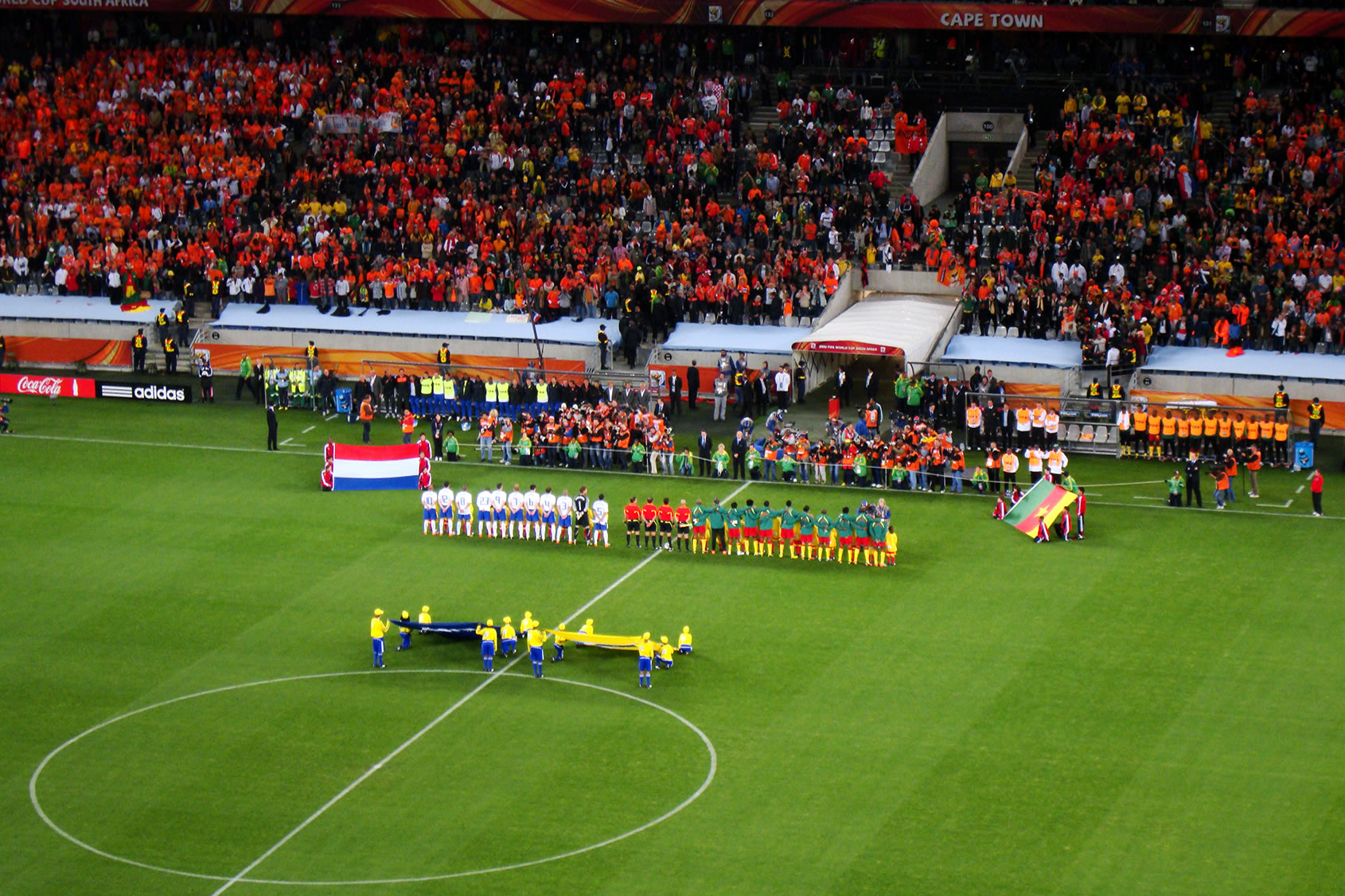
The Netherlands and Cameroon teams line up prior to the game.

Man of the Match:
Robin van Persie (Netherlands)

Assistant referees:
Patricio Basualto (Chile)
Francisco Mondria (Chile)
Fourth official:
Khalil Al Ghamdi (Saudi Arabia)
Fifth official:
Saleh Al Marzouqi (United Arab Emirates)

== See also ==
- Cameroon at the FIFA World Cup
- Denmark at the FIFA World Cup
- Japan at the FIFA World Cup
- Netherlands at the FIFA World Cup
