= 2026 FIFA World Cup Group F =

FIFA World Cup group

Group F of the 2026 FIFA World Cup took place from June 14 to 25, 2026. The group consisted of the Netherlands, Japan, Sweden, and Tunisia.

The Netherlands topped the group, winning two games and drawing the other. Japan finished as runners-up, winning one game and drawing the other two. Both teams advanced to the round of 32.

Sweden finished in third place, and their performance allowed them to advance as one of the eight best third-place teams.

However, the three teams performed poorly in the round of 32 and were eliminated from the World Cup. Tunisia were eliminated after losing their first two group games, and would go on to lose their third.

== Teams ==
Draw position	Team	Pot	Confederation	Method of qualification	Date of qualification	Finals appearance	Last appearance	Previous best performance	FIFA Rankings	
Draw position	Team	Pot	Confederation	Method of qualification	Date of qualification	Finals appearance	Last appearance	Previous best performance	November 2025 (Note: The rankings of November 2025 were used for seeding for the final draw.)	June 2026
F1	Netherlands	1	UEFA	UEFA Group G winner	November 17, 2025	12th	2022	Runner-up (1974, 1978, 2010)	7	8
F2	Japan	2	AFC	AFC third round Group C winner	March 20, 2025	8th	2022	Round of 16 (2002, 2010, 2018, 2022)	18	18
F3	Sweden	4 (Note: As the identity of the UEFA second round Path B winner was not known at the time of the final draw, positions in the FIFA Rankings were not taken into account, and the placeholder in the draw was automatically seeded into pot 4.)	UEFA	UEFA second round Path B winner	March 31, 2026	13th	2018	Runner-up (1958)	43	38
F4	Tunisia	3	CAF	CAF Group H winner	September 8, 2025	7th	2022	Group stage (1978, 1998, 2002, 2006, 2018, 2022)	40	45

== Standings ==
Pos	Team	Pld	W	D	L	GF	GA	GD	Pts	Qualification
1	Netherlands	3	2	1	0	10	4	+6	7	Advance to knockout stage
2	Japan	3	1	2	0	7	3	+4	5	Advance to knockout stage
3	Sweden	3	1	1	1	7	7	0	4	Advance to knockout stage
4	Tunisia	3	0	0	3	2	12	−10	0	

Source: FIFA
Rules for classification: Group stage tiebreakers

In the round of 32:

- The winner of Group F, the Netherlands, advanced to play the runner-up of Group C, Morocco.
- The runner-up of Group F, Japan, advanced to play the winner of Group C, Brazil.
- The third-place team of Group F, Sweden, advanced to play the winner of Group I, France, as one of the eight best third-place teams from the group stage.

== Matches ==
All times listed are local.

=== Netherlands vs Japan ===
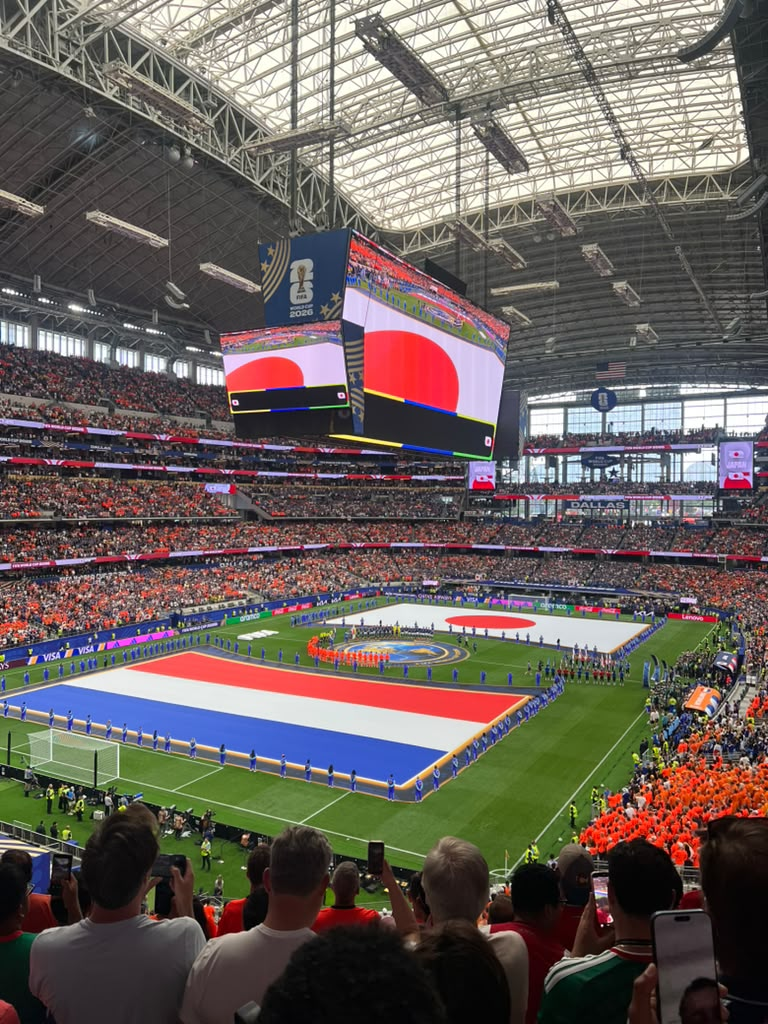
Pre-match ceremony between Netherlands and Japan

The teams had met three times prior, including the Netherlands' 1–0 group stage victory at the 2010 FIFA World Cup. Their most recent meeting took place in 2013, a 2–2 friendly draw.

Coincidentally, both teams finished with a 2–2 draw in their opening match, with Virgil van Dijk being named as Man of the Match.

June 14, 2026
3:00 p.m. UTC−5

Netherlands	2–2	Japan
Van Dijk 51'; Summerville 64'	(Note: "Netherlands vs Japan | First Stage | FIFA World Cup 2026". FIFA. Retrieved June 14, 2026.; "Match Report – Group F – Netherlands v. Japan". FIFA. June 14, 2026. Retrieved June 14, 2026.; "Post match summary report – Group F – Netherlands v. Japan". FIFA. June 14, 2026. Retrieved June 15, 2026.)	Nakamura 57'; Kamada 88'

AT&T Stadium, Arlington
Attendance: 69,285
Referee: Ismail Elfath (United States)

Netherlands	Japan

GK	1	Bart Verbruggen
RB	22	Denzel Dumfries
CB	6	Jan Paul van Hecke
CB	4	Virgil van Dijk (c)
LB	15	Micky van de Ven	(yellow card) 90+1'
DM	21	Frenkie de Jong
CM	8	Ryan Gravenberch		(substituted off) 81'
CM	14	Tijjani Reijnders		(substituted off) 70'
RF	24	Crysencio Summerville	(yellow card) 61'	(substituted off) 70'
CF	18	Donyell Malen		(substituted off) 70'
LF	11	Cody Gakpo		(substituted off) 85'
Substitutions:
FW	10	Memphis Depay	(yellow card) 83'	(substituted on) 70'
MF	26	Quinten Timber		(substituted on) 70'
MF	20	Teun Koopmeiners		(substituted on) 70'
DF	5	Nathan Aké		(substituted on) 81'
FW	19	Brian Brobbey		(substituted on) 85'
Manager:
Ronald Koeman

GK	1	Zion Suzuki
CB	16	Tsuyoshi Watanabe	(substituted off) 75'
CB	3	Shōgo Taniguchi
CB	21	Hiroki Itō
RM	10	Ritsu Dōan (c)	(substituted off) 75'
CM	24	Kaishū Sano
CM	15	Daichi Kamada
LM	13	Keito Nakamura
RF	8	Takefusa Kubo	(substituted off) 75'
CF	18	Ayase Ueda	(substituted off) 84'
LF	11	Daizen Maeda	(substituted off) 66'
Substitutions:
FW	14	Junya Itō	(substituted on) 66'
DF	2	Yukinari Sugawara	(substituted on) 75'
FW	19	Kōki Ogawa	(substituted on) 75'
DF	22	Takehiro Tomiyasu	(substituted on) 75'
FW	26	Kento Shiogai	(substituted on) 84'
Manager:
Hajime Moriyasu

Man of the Match:
Virgil van Dijk (Netherlands)

Assistant referees:
Corey Parker (United States)
Kyle Atkins (United States)
Fourth official:
Katia Itzel García (Mexico)
Reserve assistant referee:
Sandra Ramírez (Mexico)
Video assistant referee:
Armando Villarreal (United States)
Assistant video assistant referee:
Rodolpho Toski (Brazil)
Support video assistant referee:
Tomasz Kwiatkowski (Poland)

=== Sweden vs Tunisia ===
The teams had met on four previous occasions, always in friendlies. Tunisia won the most recent meeting in 2003, by 1–0.

The fixture marked Sweden's return to a major tournament after five years, having failed to qualify for both the 2022 World Cup and UEFA Euro 2024. Additionally, Sweden's five goals were the second-most the team has ever scored in a single World Cup match, behind only their 8–0 victory over Cuba in 1938.

After the match, Tunisia manager Sabri Lamouchi was relieved from his managing duties. It was the first time that a manager was sacked during the FIFA World Cup since the 1998 edition when Tunisia’s then manager Henryk Kasperczak and his side lost its first two group stage matches 2–0 to England and 1–0 to Colombia respectively. Additionally, Carlos Alberto Parreira, who was managing Saudi Arabia, and Cha Bum-kun, who was managing South Korea, both in the same tournament, were also terminated after their first two matches as well.

June 14, 2026
8:00 p.m. UTC−6

Sweden	5–1	Tunisia
Ayari 7', 90+6'; Isak 30'; Gyökeres 59'; Svanberg 84'	(Note: "Sweden vs Tunisia | First Stage | FIFA World Cup 2026". FIFA. Retrieved June 14, 2026.; " Match Report – Group F – Sweden v. Tunisia". FIFA. June 15, 2026. Retrieved June 15, 2026.; "Post match summary report – Group F – Sweden v. Tunisia". FIFA. June 14, 2026. Retrieved June 15, 2026.)	Rekik 43'

Estadio BBVA, Guadalupe
Attendance: 50,987
Referee: Yael Falcón (Argentina)

Sweden	Tunisia

GK	23	Kristoffer Nordfeldt
CB	2	Gustaf Lagerbielke
CB	4	Isak Hien
CB	3	Victor Lindelöf (c)
RM	21	Alexander Bernhardsson	(substituted off) 90+1'
CM	16	Jesper Karlström	(substituted off) 84'
CM	18	Yasin Ayari
LM	5	Gabriel Gudmundsson	(substituted off) 65'
AM	10	Benjamin Nygren	(substituted off) 65'
CF	17	Viktor Gyökeres
CF	9	Alexander Isak	(substituted off) 90+1'
Substitutions:
MF	7	Lucas Bergvall	(substituted on) 65'
DF	24	Elliot Stroud	(substituted on) 65'
MF	19	Mattias Svanberg	(substituted on) 84'
FW	11	Anthony Elanga	(substituted on) 90+1'
DF	8	Daniel Svensson	(substituted on) 90+1'
Manager:
(England) Graham Potter

GK	1	Mouhib Chamakh
CB	4	Omar Rekik
CB	3	Montassar Talbi
LB	21	Mohamed Amine Ben Hamida
RWB	20	Yan Valery		(substituted off) 72'
LWB	2	Ali Abdi
CM	13	Rani Khedira	(yellow card) 54'	(substituted off) 84'
CM	17	Ellyes Skhiri (c)		(substituted off) 72'
CM	10	Hannibal Mejbri
CF	8	Elias Saad		(substituted off) 72'
CF	25	Anis Ben Slimane		(substituted off) 84'
Substitutions:
FW	7	Elias Achouri		(substituted on) 72'
MF	15	Mohamed Belhadj Mahmoud		(substituted on) 72'
FW	26	Sebastian Tounekti		(substituted on) 72'
FW	19	Firas Chaouat		(substituted on) 84'
MF	11	Ismaël Gharbi		(substituted on) 84'
Manager:
(France) Sabri Lamouchi

Man of the Match:
Alexander Isak (Sweden)

Assistant referees:
Maximiliano Del Yesso (Argentina)
Facundo Rodríguez (Argentina)
Fourth official:
Juan Gabriel Calderón (Costa Rica)
Reserve assistant referee:
Juan Carlos Mora (Costa Rica)
Video assistant referee:
Juan Lara (Chile)
Assistant video assistant referee:
Antonio García (Uruguay)
Support video assistant referee:
Hernán Mastrángelo (Argentina)

=== Netherlands vs Sweden ===
The teams had met on 25 previous occasions, including a scoreless draw during the group stage at the 1974 FIFA World Cup, and most recently in a 2–0 win for the Netherlands in a World Cup Qualifier match in 2017.

Brian Brobbey scored in the fifth and seventeenth minute, the fourth-fastest brace in World Cup history. The fixture was Sweden's worst defeat at the World Cup since being thrashed 7–1 by Brazil in 1950, which also remains Brazil's biggest win in a tournament match. The win set a new record for the longest unbeaten run in World Cup history, with fourteen matches (spanning from the 2014 World Cup and excluding 2018, which they failed to qualify for), surpassing the previous record by Brazil.

June 20, 2026
12:00 p.m. UTC−5

Netherlands	5–1	Sweden
Brobbey 5', 17'; Gakpo 47', 54'; Summerville 89'	(Note: "Netherlands vs Sweden | First Stage | FIFA World Cup 2026". FIFA. Retrieved June 20, 2026.; "Match Report – Group F – Netherlands v. Sweden". FIFA. June 20, 2026. Retrieved June 20, 2026.; "Post match summary report – Group F – Netherlands v. Sweden". FIFA. June 20, 2026. Retrieved June 25, 2026.)	Elanga 59'

NRG Stadium, Houston
Attendance: 68,777
Referee: Michael Oliver (England)

Netherlands	Sweden

GK	1	Bart Verbruggen
RB	22	Denzel Dumfries
CB	6	Jan Paul van Hecke
CB	4	Virgil van Dijk (c)
LB	15	Micky van de Ven
CM	8	Ryan Gravenberch
CM	21	Frenkie de Jong	(substituted off) 59'
CM	14	Tijjani Reijnders	(substituted off) 59'
RF	18	Donyell Malen	(substituted off) 46'
CF	19	Brian Brobbey	(substituted off) 72'
LF	11	Cody Gakpo	(substituted off) 90'
Substitutions:
FW	24	Crysencio Summerville	(substituted on) 46'
MF	20	Teun Koopmeiners	(substituted on) 59'
MF	16	Guus Til	(substituted on) 59'
FW	10	Memphis Depay	(substituted on) 72'
FW	17	Noa Lang	(substituted on) 90'
Manager:
Ronald Koeman

GK	23	Kristoffer Nordfeldt
CB	2	Gustaf Lagerbielke
CB	4	Isak Hien
CB	3	Victor Lindelöf (c)
RM	21	Alexander Bernhardsson		(substituted off) 55'
CM	10	Benjamin Nygren		(substituted off) 55'
CM	16	Jesper Karlström		(substituted off) 55'
CM	18	Yasin Ayari	(yellow card) 75'	(substituted off) 79'
LM	5	Gabriel Gudmundsson	(yellow card) 53'	(substituted off) 90+3'
CF	17	Viktor Gyökeres
CF	9	Alexander Isak
Substitutions:
FW	11	Anthony Elanga		(substituted on) 55'
MF	22	Besfort Zeneli		(substituted on) 55'
MF	7	Lucas Bergvall	(yellow card) 80'	(substituted on) 55'
FW	26	Taha Ali		(substituted on) 79'
DF	24	Elliot Stroud		(substituted on) 90+3'
Manager:
(England) Graham Potter

Man of the Match:
Cody Gakpo (Netherlands)

Assistant referees:
Stuart Burt (England)
James Mainwaring (England)
Fourth official:
Abongile Tom (South Africa)
Reserve assistant referee:
Zakhele Siwela (South Africa)
Video assistant referee:
Jarred Gillett (England)
Assistant video assistant referee:
Ivan Bebek (Croatia)
Support video assistant referee:
Rodolpho Toski (Brazil)

=== Tunisia vs Japan ===
The teams have previously met six times, including Japan's 2–0 group stage victory at the 2002 FIFA World Cup (which they co-hosted with South Korea). Their latest meeting took place in the 2023 Kirin Challenge Cup, which Japan also won by 2–0.

This fixture was the 1,000th World Cup match, with the previous milestone (900th) having been reached in the 2018 FIFA World Cup final. Moments before kickoff, a special pre-game celebration ceremony was held at the stadium with Princess Takamado (Honorary Patron of the Japan Football Association) in attendance.

With Tunisia losing their match, they became the third team to be eliminated from the tournament, following Haiti and Turkey, after losing two consecutive matches. Additionally, Tunisia became the sole African team to be eliminated from the group stage.

As for Japan, they became the first Asian team to score multiple goals in a single FIFA World Cup match, surpassing their own previous scoring record set during a 3–1 victory over Denmark in 2010.

June 20, 2026
10:00 p.m. UTC−6

Tunisia	0–4	Japan
	(Note: "Tunisia vs Japan | First Stage | FIFA World Cup 2026". FIFA. Retrieved June 21, 2026.; "Match Report – Group F – Tunisia v. Japan". FIFA. June 21, 2026. Retrieved June 21, 2026.; "Post match summary report – Group F – Tunisia v. Japan". FIFA. June 21, 2026. Retrieved June 25, 2026.)	Kamada 4'; Ueda 31', 83'; J. Itō 69'

Estadio BBVA, Guadalupe
Attendance: 51,243
Referee: István Kovács (Romania)

Tunisia	Japan

GK	16	Aymen Dahmen
CB	6	Dylan Bronn	(substituted off) 46'
CB	3	Montassar Talbi
CB	4	Omar Rekik
RWB	20	Yan Valery
LWB	2	Ali Abdi	(substituted off) 90'
CM	10	Hannibal Mejbri
CM	25	Anis Ben Slimane
CM	17	Ellyes Skhiri (c)	(substituted off) 90'
CF	26	Sebastian Tounekti	(substituted off) 64'
CF	8	Elias Saad	(substituted off) 46'
Substitutions:
MF	11	Ismael Gharbi	(substituted on) 46'
DF	21	Mohamed Amine Ben Hamida	(substituted on) 46'
FW	19	Firas Chaouat	(substituted on) 64'
FW	7	Elias Achouri	(substituted on) 90'
MF	13	Rani Khedira	(substituted on) 90'
Manager:
(France) Hervé Renard

GK	1	Zion Suzuki
CB	22	Takehiro Tomiyasu	(substituted off) 78'
CB	4	Kō Itakura (c)
CB	21	Hiroki Itō
RM	10	Ritsu Dōan	(substituted off) 74'
CM	24	Kaishū Sano
CM	7	Ao Tanaka
LM	13	Keito Nakamura	(substituted off) 78'
RF	14	Junya Itō
CF	18	Ayase Ueda	(substituted off) 84'
LF	15	Daichi Kamada	(substituted off) 74'
Substitutions:
DF	2	Yukinari Sugawara	(substituted on) 74'
DF	25	Junnosuke Suzuki	(substituted on) 74'
MF	17	Yuito Suzuki	(substituted on) 78'
DF	20	Ayumu Seko	(substituted on) 78'
FW	9	Keisuke Gotō	(substituted on) 84'
Manager:
Hajime Moriyasu

Man of the Match:
Ayase Ueda (Japan)

Assistant referees:
Mihai Marius Marica (Romania)
Ferencz Tunyogi (Romania)
Fourth official:
Juan Gabriel Calderón (Costa Rica)
Reserve assistant referee:
Juan Carlos Mora (Costa Rica)
Video assistant referee:
Fedayi San (Switzerland)
Assistant video assistant referee:
Joe Dickerson (United States)
Support video assistant referee:
Bastian Dankert (Germany)

=== Japan vs Sweden ===
The teams had met five times, with Japan's only win from the notorious match in the 1936 Olympics in the first round. Their most recent meeting, a friendly in 2002, ended in a 1–1 draw.

In the 56th minute, Japan took the lead when Daizen Maeda scored with a low shot after running onto a pass from Ritsu Dōan in the penalty area. Anthony Elanga equalised in the 62nd minute when he curled into the net from out on the right edge of the penalty area, low into the left corner of the net. The draw was enough for Japan to finish in second place in the group.

June 25, 2026
6:00 p.m. UTC−5

Japan	1–1	Sweden
Maeda 56'	(Note: "Japan vs Sweden | First Stage | FIFA World Cup 2026". FIFA. Retrieved June 26, 2026.; "Match Report – Group F – Japan v. Sweden". FIFA. June 26, 2026. Retrieved June 26, 2026.; "Post match summary report – Group F – Japan v. Sweden". FIFA. June 25, 2026. Retrieved June 27, 2026.)	Elanga 62'

AT&T Stadium, Arlington
Attendance: 70,137
Referee: Iván Barton (El Salvador)

Japan	Sweden

GK	1	Zion Suzuki
CB	20	Ayumu Seko		(substituted off) 75'
CB	4	Kō Itakura (c)		(substituted off) 39'
CB	21	Hiroki Itō
RM	2	Yukinari Sugawara
CM	15	Daichi Kamada
CM	7	Ao Tanaka
LM	13	Keito Nakamura		(substituted off) 75'
RF	10	Ritsu Dōan		(substituted off) 66'
CF	18	Ayase Ueda		(substituted off) 66'
LF	11	Daizen Maeda
Substitutions:
DF	3	Shōgo Taniguchi	(yellow card) 77'	(substituted on) 39'
MF	14	Junya Itō		(substituted on) 66'
FW	19	Kōki Ogawa		(substituted on) 66'
DF	5	Yūto Nagatomo		(substituted on) 75'
DF	16	Tsuyoshi Watanabe		(substituted on) 75'
Manager:
Hajime Moriyasu

GK	1	Jacob Widell Zetterström
CB	2	Gustaf Lagerbielke
CB	4	Isak Hien	(yellow card) 32'	(substituted off) 37'
CB	5	Gabriel Gudmundsson		(substituted off) 87'
RM	21	Alexander Bernhardsson		(substituted off) 75'
CM	3	Victor Lindelöf (c)		(substituted off) 87'
CM	18	Yasin Ayari
LM	24	Elliot Stroud		(substituted off) 75'
RF	11	Anthony Elanga
CF	17	Viktor Gyökeres	(yellow card) 84'
LF	9	Alexander Isak
Substitutions:
MF	7	Lucas Bergvall		(substituted on) 37'
DF	8	Daniel Svensson		(substituted on) 75'
MF	13	Ken Sema		(substituted on) 75'
DF	15	Carl Starfelt		(substituted on) 87'
MF	10	Benjamin Nygren		(substituted on) 87'
Manager:
(England) Graham Potter

Man of the Match:
Anthony Elanga (Sweden)

Assistant referees:
David Morán (El Salvador)
Henry Pupiro (Nicaragua)
Fourth official:
Dahane Beida (Mauritania)
Reserve assistant referee:
Jerson Emiliano dos Santos (Angola)
Video assistant referee:
Nicolás Gallo (Colombia)
Assistant video assistant referee:
Guillermo Pacheco (Mexico)
Support video assistant referee:
Rodolpho Toski (Brazil)

=== Tunisia vs Netherlands ===
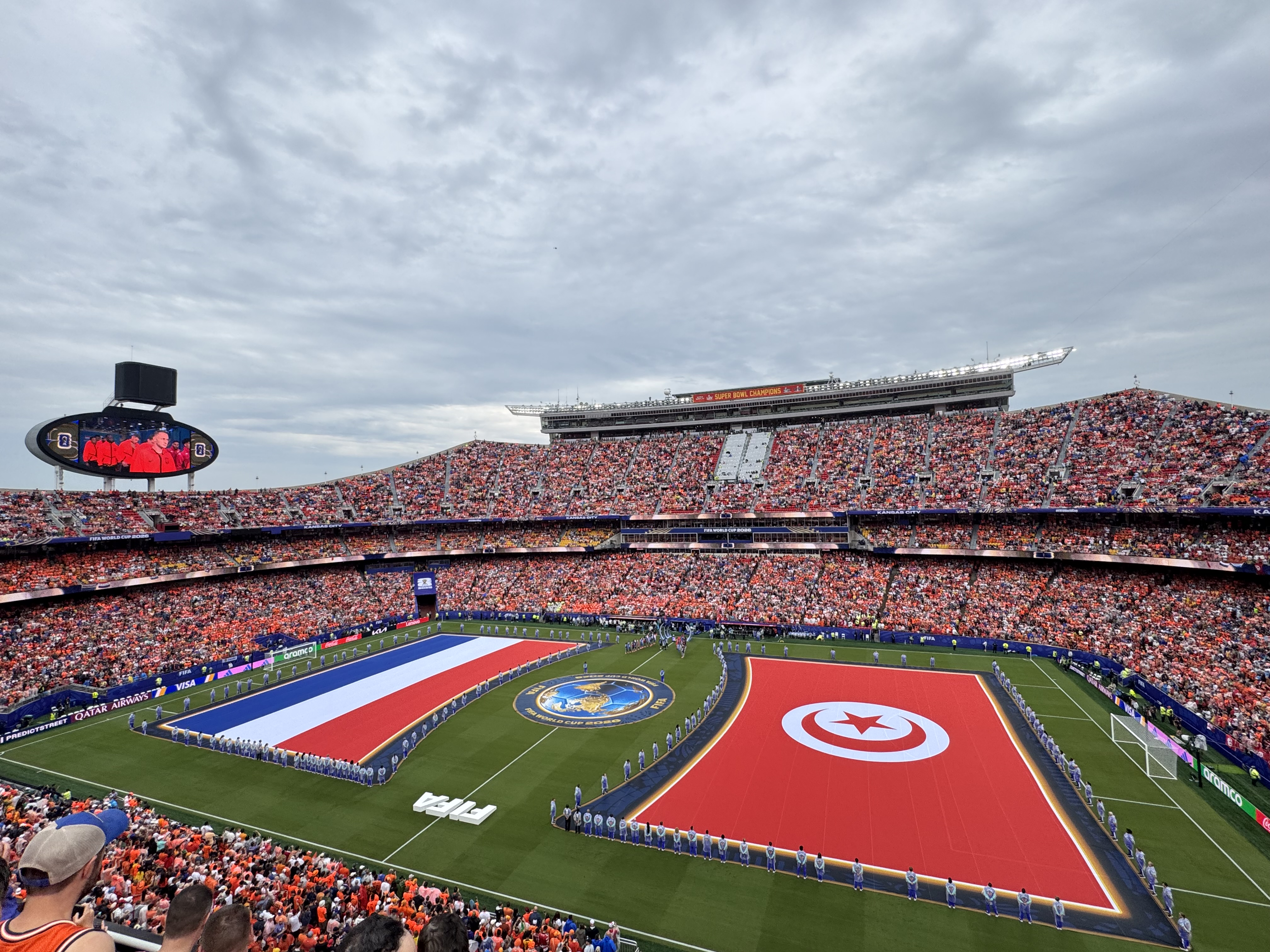
Pre-match ceremony between Tunisia and the Netherlands

The teams had previously faced each other thrice, most recently in a 2009 friendly match that ended in a 1–1 draw.

With Tunisia already eliminated, they were off to a very shaky start. Ellyes Skhiri committed a costly own goal in the third minute, which allowed the formidable Dutch team to stretch the lead. Brian Brobbey would follow with a shot four minutes later. On the second half, Tunisia's sole goal was made by Hazem Mastouri on the 53rd minute, while it was Jan Paul van Hecke who sealed the Netherlands' top spot in the group stage.

Tunisia suffered its worst tournament performance to date, finishing without a single point despite winning matches in its previous two appearances in 2018 and 2022. This stood in stark contrast to its qualifying campaign, where it became the first African team to reach the World Cup without conceding a single goal.

June 25, 2026
6:00 p.m. UTC−5

Tunisia	1–3	Netherlands
Mastouri 54'	(Note: "Tunisia vs Netherlands | First Stage | FIFA World Cup 2026". FIFA. Retrieved June 26, 2026.; "Match Report – Group F – Tunisia v. Netherlands". FIFA. June 26, 2026. Retrieved June 26, 2026.; "Post match summary report – Group F – Tunisia v. Netherlands". FIFA. June 25, 2026. Retrieved June 27, 2026.)	Skhiri 3' (o.g.); Brobbey 7'; Van Hecke 62'

Arrowhead Stadium, Kansas City
Attendance: 68,391
Referee: Katia Itzel García (Mexico)

Tunisia	Netherlands

GK	16	Aymen Dahmen
CB	3	Montassar Talbi
CB	17	Ellyes Skhiri (c)
CB	21	Mohamed Amine Ben Hamida	(substituted off) 67'
RWB	20	Yan Valery
LWB	2	Ali Abdi
RM	25	Anis Ben Slimane	(substituted off) 67'
CM	11	Ismaël Gharbi	(substituted off) 75'
CM	13	Rani Khedira	(substituted off) 67'
LM	10	Hannibal Mejbri
CF	9	Hazem Mastouri	(substituted off) 90'
Substitutions:
MF	15	Mohamed Belhadj Mahmoud	(substituted on) 67'
DF	12	Mortadha Ben Ouanes	(substituted on) 67'
FW	7	Elias Achouri	(substituted on) 67'
FW	19	Firas Chaouat	(substituted on) 75'
FW	26	Sebastian Tounekti	(substituted on) 90'
Manager:
(France) Hervé Renard

GK	1	Bart Verbruggen
RB	22	Denzel Dumfries
CB	6	Jan Paul van Hecke
CB	4	Virgil van Dijk (c)
LB	5	Nathan Aké
DM	21	Frenkie de Jong	(substituted off) 72'
CM	8	Ryan Gravenberch
CM	14	Tijjani Reijnders	(substituted off) 72'
RF	18	Donyell Malen	(substituted off) 72'
CF	19	Brian Brobbey	(substituted off) 77'
LF	11	Cody Gakpo	(substituted off) 84'
Substitutions:
MF	20	Teun Koopmeiners	(substituted on) 72'
MF	7	Justin Kluivert	(substituted on) 72'
FW	24	Crysencio Summerville	(substituted on) 72'
FW	10	Memphis Depay	(substituted on) 77'
FW	17	Noa Lang	(substituted on) 84'
Manager:
Ronald Koeman

Man of the Match:
Brian Brobbey (Netherlands)

Assistant referees:
Sandra Ramírez (Mexico)
José Enrique Naranjo Pérez (Spain)
Fourth official:
Juan Gabriel Benítez (Paraguay)
Reserve assistant referee:
Milcíades Saldívar (Paraguay)
Video assistant referee:
Erick Miranda (Mexico)
Assistant video assistant referee:
Mohammed Obaid Khadim (United Arab Emirates)
Support video assistant referee:
Hernán Mastrángelo (Argentina)

== Discipline ==
The team conduct ("fair play") score would have been used as a tiebreaker if the head-to-head and overall records of teams were tied. It would also be used as a tiebreaker for the third-place ranking between groups if the overall records of teams were tied. The score was calculated based on yellow and red cards received by players and team officials in all group matches as follows:

- yellow card: −1 point;
- indirect red card (second yellow card): −3 points;
- direct red card: −4 points;
- yellow card and direct red card: −5 points;

Only one of the above deductions could be applied to a player or team official in a single match.

Team	Match 1				Match 2				Match 3				Score
Team	Yellow card	(yellow card) (yellow-red card)	Red card	(yellow card) (red card)	Yellow card	(yellow card) (yellow-red card)	Red card	(yellow card) (red card)	Yellow card	(yellow card) (yellow-red card)	Red card	(yellow card) (red card)	Score
Japan									1				−1
Tunisia	1												−1
Netherlands	3												−3
Sweden					3				2				−5
