= Mauricio Pineda (footballer, born 1975) =

Argentine footballer

Personal information
- Full name: Mauricio Héctor Pineda
- Date of birth: 13 July 1975 (age 51)
- Place of birth: Buenos Aires, Argentina
- Height: 1.77 m (5 ft 10 in)
- Position: Left back

Senior career*
Years	Team	Apps	(Gls)
1993–1996	Huracán	73	(6)
1996–1997	Boca Juniors	17	(0)
1998–2003	Udinese	35	(0)
1998–1999	→ Mallorca (loan)	4	(0)
2000–2001	→ Napoli (loan)	22	(0)
2002–2003	→ Cagliari (loan)	22	(0)
2003–2004	Lanús	5	(0)
2004–2005	Colón	0	(0)
Total		173	(6)

International career
1992–1996	Argentina U23		
1996–1998	Argentina	12	(1)
Medal record
Olympic medal record
Representing Argentina
Men's Football
Silver medal – second place	1996 Atlanta	Team competition
- * Club domestic league appearances and goals

Mauricio Héctor Pineda (born 13 July 1975 in Buenos Aires) is an Argentine former professional footballer who played as a defender. He appeared for Argentina at the 1998 World Cup, scoring their winning goal in their final group match against Croatia.

In 1992, Pineda represented Argentina U23 at the 1992 CONMEBOL Pre-Olympic Tournament in Paraguay, which saw Argentina fail to qualify for the 1992 Summer Olympics.

== Career statistics ==
=== International ===
Scores and results list Argentina's goal tally first, score column indicates score after each Pineda goal.

List of international goals scored by Mauricio Pineda
No.	Date	Venue	Opponent	Score	Result	Competition
1	26 June 1998	Parc Lescure, Bordeaux, France	Croatia	1–0	1–0	1998 FIFA World Cup

== Honours ==
Udinese

- UEFA Intertoto Cup: 2000

Argentina U23

- Olympic Silver Medal: 1996
