= Anthony Elanga =

Swedish footballer (born 2002)

- Elanga with Sweden in 2026

Personal information
- Full name: Anthony David Junior Elanga
- Date of birth: 27 April 2002 (age 24)
- Place of birth: Malmö, Sweden
- Height: 1.78 m (5 ft 10 in)
- Positions: Right winger; forward

Team information
- Current team: Newcastle United
- Number: 19

Youth career
- 2008–2013: IF Elfsborg
- 2014: Malmö FF
- 2014–2015: Hattersley
- 2015–2021: Manchester United

Senior career*
Years	Team	Apps	(Gls)
2021–2023	Manchester United	39	(3)
2023–2025	Nottingham Forest	74	(11)
2025–	Newcastle United	37	(2)

International career^{‡}
2018–2019	Sweden U17	5	(2)
2019	Sweden U19	3	(0)
2021	Sweden U21	8	(7)
2022–	Sweden	36	(8)
- * Club domestic league appearances and goals as of 13:50, 29 August 2026 (UTC) ‡ National team caps and goals as of 23:55, 17 November 2026 (UTC)

Anthony David Junior Elanga (born 27 April 2002) is a Swedish professional footballer who plays as a right winger for Premier League club Newcastle United and the Sweden national team.

== Early life ==
Elanga was born in and spent his early childhood in the Hyllie district of Malmö, Sweden. At the age of 12, he moved with his family to Hattersley in Greater Manchester, where he attended Hyde High School.

== Club career ==
=== Manchester United ===
==== Youth ====
Elanga played for Elfsborg and Malmö as a boy in Sweden. After moving to England, he played briefly for local club Hattersley. Elanga was scouted by both Manchester City and Manchester United, but joined United at the age of 12. Elanga debuted for the United under-18s at the age of 15 in a 2–1 away defeat to Liverpool in April 2018. He signed as an academy scholar at United in July 2018, and scored four goals in 22 appearances in his first full season playing for the Under-18s.

The following season, Elanga played twice for the Under-21s in the EFL Trophy, both as a substitute. He finished the COVID-shortened season as the Under-18s' top scorer in the league with seven goals in nine appearances, and won the Jimmy Murphy Young Player of the Year award. He played four times for the club's under-21 side in the 2020–21 EFL Trophy, scoring twice.

==== 2020–2022: Debut and breakthrough ====
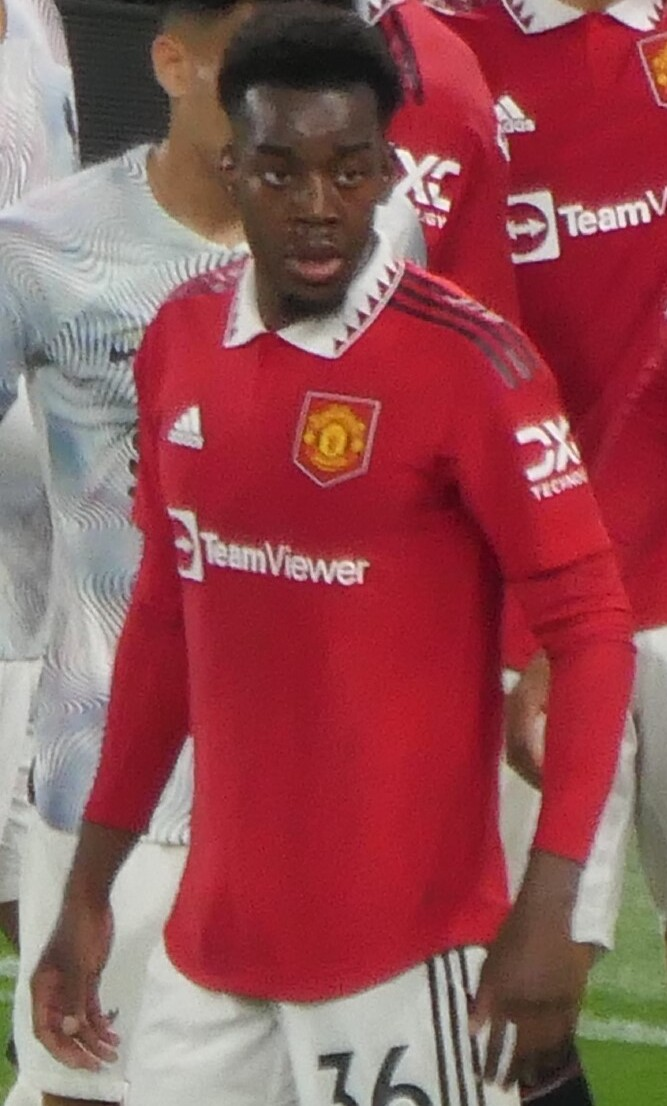
Elanga with Manchester United in 2022

Elanga made his first-team debut for United in a pre-season friendly against Aston Villa ahead of the 2020–21 Premier League season; he came on as a substitute for Marcus Rashford in the 75th minute of a 1–0 defeat. After signing a new long-term contract with the club in March 2021, he was called up to the first team for the 2020–21 UEFA Europa League quarter-final matches against Granada in April, but was an unused substitute in both legs, as well as in the second leg of the semi-final against Roma on 6 May.

Elanga made his competitive debut for the club on 11 May in a league fixture against Leicester City. He was replaced by Marcus Rashford in the 66th minute as United lost 2–1. He started again away to Wolverhampton Wanderers on the final day of the league season, and scored his first United goal after 13 minutes. Elanga scored his second league goal for United on 19 January 2022 in a 3–1 away win against Brentford, his first of the season. On 4 February that year, Elanga missed his team's last penalty in a 8–7 shootout against Middlesbrough during their FA Cup tie, knocking United out of the Cup for the season. On 23 February, Elanga scored his first UEFA Champions League goal against Atlético Madrid in the Round of 16 first leg, the final score was 1–1.

=== Nottingham Forest ===
On 25 July 2023, it was announced that Elanga had signed a five-year deal with Nottingham Forest for a reported £15 million transfer fee. He scored his first goal in a 1–0 away win against Chelsea on 2 September. On 26 December 2024, Elanga scored the only goal in a 1–0 victory in a Premier League home game against Tottenham Hotspur. On 1 February 2025, he provided a hat-trick of assists in a 7–0 victory over Brighton. On 1 April, Elanga scored the only and winning goal for Forest against his former club Manchester United. He concluded the 2024–25 season with a career-high six goals.

=== Newcastle United ===
Elanga playing for Newcastle United in 2026.

On 11 July 2025, Elanga joined Newcastle United for a reported £55 million transfer fee. On 16 August, he made his debut for the club in a 0–0 draw against Aston Villa in the league. He scored his first goal in a 3–1 away defeat against Manchester City in the EFL Cup semi-final second leg on 4 February 2026. A month later, on 18 March, he netted a brace in a 7–2 away defeat against Barcelona in the Champions League round of 16. However, despite making 32 Premier League appearances in his debut season, he failed to score a league goal.

== International career ==
Elanga was eligible to play for Sweden, Cameroon, or England at international level. He has represented Sweden at under-17, under-19, under-21, and senior levels.

Elanga played five times for the Sweden under-17 team and scored two goals, both against France in the 2019 UEFA European Under-17 Championship. He played his first game for the Sweden under-21 team and scored one goal in a friendly against Finland on 3 June 2021.

Elanga chose to represent Sweden at a senior level, citing being born and having spent the majority of his life there, as well as the country meaning a lot to him as the reasons behind his decision. He was named in the international squad of Janne Andersson for the World Cup qualifiers against the Czech Republic in March 2022, where he also made his debut as a late-game substitute.

Elanga scored his first goal at senior international level on 5 June 2022 in a 1–2 loss against Norway in a 2022–23 UEFA Nations League B game.

He scored a goal in Sweden's winning game in the play off finals for the 2026 World Cup against Poland on 31 March 2026. On 12 May 2026, Elanga was named in the Sweden squad for the 2026 FIFA World Cup. During the tournament's group stage, he scored in the 59th minute of a match against the Netherlands. In the final group match against Japan on 25 June 2026, Elanga scored Sweden's crucial equalizer in a 1–1 draw, securing the team's qualification for the knockout stage (Round of 32).

== Personal life ==
Elanga is a native speaker of Swedish and English, having moved to England at age 12. Thanks to his Cameroonian heritage, he speaks decent French.

His father, Joseph Elanga, is a Cameroonian former professional footballer. He represented the Cameroon national football team and was included in the nation's squad for the 1998 FIFA World Cup in France. A defender, Joseph Elanga played for Canon Yaoundé, Malmö FF, as well as clubs in Greece and Denmark.

His mother, Daniella Elanga, is also a former footballer who represented the Cameroon women's national football team.

== Career statistics ==
=== Club ===
As of match played 2 November 2026

Appearances and goals by club, season and competition
Club	Season	League			FA Cup		EFL Cup		Europe		Total	
Club	Season	Division	Apps	Goals	Apps	Goals	Apps	Goals	Apps	Goals	Apps	Goals
Manchester United	2020–21	Premier League	2	1	0	0	0	0	0	0	2	1
Manchester United	2021–22	Premier League	21	2	2	0	1	0	3 (Note: Appearances in UEFA Champions League)	1	27	3
Manchester United	2022–23	Premier League	16	0	1	0	4	0	5 (Note: Appearances in UEFA Europa League)	0	26	0
Manchester United	Total		39	3	3	0	5	0	8	1	55	4
Nottingham Forest	2023–24	Premier League	36	5	2	0	1	0	—		39	5
Nottingham Forest	2024–25	Premier League	38	6	4	0	1	0	—		43	6
Nottingham Forest	Total		74	11	6	0	2	0	—		82	11
Newcastle United	2025–26	Premier League	32	0	2	0	5	1	10	2	49	3
Newcastle United	2026–27	Premier League	5	2	0	0	3	0	—		8	2
Newcastle United	Total		37	2	2	0	8	1	10	2	57	5
Career total			150	16	11	0	15	1	18	3	194	20

=== International ===
As of match played 17 November 2026

Appearances and goals by national team and year
National team	Year	Apps	Goals
Sweden	2022	9	1
Sweden	2023	4	2
Sweden	2024	6	0
Sweden	2025	7	2
Sweden	2026	10	3
Total		36	8

Scores and results list Sweden's goal tally first, score column indicates score after each Elanga goal.

List of international goals scored by Anthony Elanga
No.	Date	Venue	Cap	Opponent	Score	Result	Competition
1	5 June 2022	Friends Arena, Solna, Sweden	3	Norway	1–2	1–2	2022–23 UEFA Nations League B
2	27 March 2023	Friends Arena, Solna, Sweden	10	Azerbaijan	5–0	5–0	UEFA Euro 2024 qualifying
3	16 June 2023	Friends Arena, Solna, Sweden	11	New Zealand	4–1	4–1	Friendly
4	25 March 2025	Strawberry Arena, Solna, Sweden	21	Northern Ireland	5–0	5–1	Friendly
5	5 September 2025	Stožice Stadium, Ljubljana, Slovenia	23	Slovenia	1–0	2–2	2026 FIFA World Cup qualification
6	31 March 2026	Strawberry Arena, Solna, Sweden	28	Poland	1–0	3–2	2026 FIFA World Cup qualification
7	20 June 2026	NRG Stadium, Houston, United States	32	Netherlands	1–4	1–5	2026 FIFA World Cup
8	25 June 2026	AT&T Stadium, Arlington, United States	33	Japan	1–1	1–1	2026 FIFA World Cup

== Honours ==
Manchester United

- EFL Cup: 2022–23
- FA Cup runner-up: 2022–23
- UEFA Europa League runner-up: 2020–21

Individual

- Jimmy Murphy Young Player of the Year: 2019–20
- Premier League Goal of the Month: August 2026
