= 2002 FIFA World Cup Group H =

Football tournament group stage

Group H of the 2002 FIFA World Cup took place from 4 June 2002 to 14 June 2002. Japan won the group and advanced to the round of 16 (for the first time ever), along with Belgium. Russia and Tunisia failed to advance.

== Standings ==
Pos	Team	Pld	W	D	L	GF	GA	GD	Pts	Qualification
1	Japan (H)	3	2	1	0	5	2	+3	7	Advance to knockout stage
2	Belgium	3	1	2	0	6	5	+1	5	Advance to knockout stage
3	Russia	3	1	0	2	4	4	0	3	
4	Tunisia	3	0	1	2	1	5	−4	1	

Source: FIFA
Rules for classification: Tie-breaking criteria
(H) Hosts
- Japan advanced to play Turkey (runner-up of Group C) in the round of 16.
- Belgium advanced to play Brazil (winner of Group C) in the round of 16.

== Matches ==
All times are local (UTC+9)

=== Japan vs Belgium ===
4 June 2002
18:00

Japan	2–2	Belgium
Suzuki 59'; Inamoto 67'		Wilmots 57'; Van der Heyden 75'

Saitama Stadium, Saitama
Attendance: 55,256
Referee: William Mattus (Costa Rica)

Japan	Belgium

GK	12	Seigo Narazaki
CB	3	Naoki Matsuda
CB	4	Ryuzo Morioka (c)		(substituted off) 71'
CB	16	Kōji Nakata
CM	21	Kazuyuki Toda	(yellow card) 31'
CM	5	Junichi Inamoto	(yellow card) 54'
RW	22	Daisuke Ichikawa
AM	7	Hidetoshi Nakata
LW	18	Shinji Ono		(substituted off) 64'
CF	13	Atsushi Yanagisawa
CF	11	Takayuki Suzuki		(substituted off) 68'
Substitutions:
MF	14	Alex		(substituted on) 64'
MF	8	Hiroaki Morishima		(substituted on) 68'
DF	17	Tsuneyasu Miyamoto		(substituted on) 71'
Manager:
(France) Philippe Troussier

GK	1	Geert De Vlieger
RB	15	Jacky Peeters
CB	16	Daniel Van Buyten
CB	4	Eric Van Meir	(yellow card) 82'
LB	12	Peter Van Der Heyden	(yellow card) 21'
DM	18	Yves Vanderhaeghe
RM	10	Johan Walem		(substituted off) 68'
CM	6	Timmy Simons
LM	8	Bart Goor
CF	7	Marc Wilmots (c)
CF	11	Gert Verheyen	(yellow card) 62'	(substituted off) 83'
Substitutions:
FW	9	Wesley Sonck		(substituted on) 68'
FW	20	Branko Strupar		(substituted on) 83'
Manager:
Robert Waseige

Man of the Match:
Junichi Inamoto (Japan)

Assistant referees:
Haidar Koleit (Lebanon)
Yury Dupanov (Belarus)
Fourth official:
Graham Poll (England)

=== Russia vs Tunisia ===
5 June 2002
15:30

Russia	2–0	Tunisia
Titov 59'; Karpin 64' (pen.)

Kobe Wing Stadium, Kobe
Attendance: 30,957
Referee: Peter Prendergast (Jamaica)

Russia	Tunisia

GK	1	Ruslan Nigmatullin
RB	5	Andrei Solomatin
CB	3	Yuri Nikiforov
CB	7	Viktor Onopko (c)
LB	2	Yuri Kovtun
RM	8	Valery Karpin
CM	9	Yegor Titov
CM	20	Marat Izmailov		(substituted off) 78'
LM	6	Igor Semshov	(yellow card) 27'	(substituted off) 46'
CF	19	Ruslan Pimenov
CF	11	Vladimir Beschastnykh		(substituted off) 55'
Substitutions:
MF	21	Dmitri Khokhlov		(substituted on) 46'
FW	22	Dmitri Sychev		(substituted on) 55'
MF	15	Dmitri Alenichev	(yellow card) 88'	(substituted on) 78'
Manager:
Oleg Romantsev

GK	1	Ali Boumnijel
RB	6	Hatem Trabelsi
CB	15	Radhi Jaïdi
CB	4	Mohamed Mkacher
LB	12	Raouf Bouzaiene
RM	8	Hassen Gabsi	(yellow card) 50'	(substituted off) 67'
CM	13	Riadh Bouazizi
CM	18	Selim Ben Achour
LM	2	Khaled Badra		(substituted off) 84'
CF	5	Ziad Jaziri	(yellow card) 75'
CF	11	Adel Sellimi (c)		(substituted off) 67'
Substitutions:
MF	3	Zoubeir Baya		(substituted on) 67'
MF	7	Imed Mhedhebi		(substituted on) 67'
FW	20	Ali Zitouni		(substituted on) 84'
Manager:
Ammar Souayah

Man of the Match:
Yuri Nikiforov (Russia)

Assistant referees:
Michael Ragoonath (Trinidad and Tobago)
Paul Smith (New Zealand)
Fourth official:
Antonio López Nieto (Spain)

=== Japan vs Russia ===
9 June 2002
20:30

Japan	1–0	Russia
Inamoto 51'

International Stadium Yokohama, Yokohama
Attendance: 66,108
Referee: Markus Merk (Germany)

Japan	Russia

GK	12	Seigo Narazaki
CB	3	Naoki Matsuda
CB	17	Tsuneyasu Miyamoto (c)	(yellow card) 15'
CB	16	Kōji Nakata	(yellow card) 42'
RM	20	Tomokazu Myojin
CM	21	Kazuyuki Toda
CM	7	Hidetoshi Nakata
CM	5	Junichi Inamoto		(substituted off) 85'
LM	18	Shinji Ono		(substituted off) 75'
CF	11	Takayuki Suzuki		(substituted off) 72'
CF	13	Atsushi Yanagisawa
Substitutions:
FW	10	Masashi Nakayama	(yellow card) 90+1'	(substituted on) 72'
DF	6	Toshihiro Hattori		(substituted on) 75'
MF	15	Takashi Fukunishi		(substituted on) 85'
Manager:
(France) Philippe Troussier

GK	1	Ruslan Nigmatullin
RB	5	Andrei Solomatin	(yellow card) 38'
CB	3	Yuri Nikiforov
CB	7	Viktor Onopko (c)
LB	2	Yuri Kovtun
RM	8	Valery Karpin
CM	4	Alexey Smertin		(substituted off) 57'
CM	9	Yegor Titov
CM	20	Marat Izmailov		(substituted off) 52'
LM	6	Igor Semshov
CF	19	Ruslan Pimenov	(yellow card) 13'	(substituted off) 46'
Substitutions:
FW	22	Dmitri Sychev		(substituted on) 46'
MF	21	Dmitri Khokhlov	(yellow card) 60'	(substituted on) 52'
FW	11	Vladimir Beschastnykh		(substituted on) 57'
Manager:
Oleg Romantsev

Man of the Match:
Junichi Inamoto (Japan)

Assistant referees:
Heiner Müller (Germany)
Evzen Amler (Czech Republic)
Fourth official:
Ubaldo Aquino (Paraguay)

=== Tunisia vs Belgium ===
10 June 2002
18:00

Tunisia	1–1	Belgium
Bouzaiene 17'		Wilmots 13'

Ōita Big Eye Stadium, Ōita
Attendance: 39,700
Referee: Mark Shield (Australia)

Tunisia	Belgium

GK	1	Ali Boumnijel
RB	6	Hatem Trabelsi	(yellow card) 68'
CB	15	Radhi Jaïdi
CB	2	Khaled Badra (c)
LB	12	Raouf Bouzaiene
RM	8	Hassen Gabsi	(yellow card) 22'	(substituted off) 67'
CM	10	Kaies Ghodhbane	(yellow card) 43'
CM	18	Selim Ben Achour
CM	13	Riadh Bouazizi
LM	21	Mourad Melki	(yellow card) 69'	(substituted off) 88'
CF	5	Ziad Jaziri		(substituted off) 77'
Substitutions:
FW	11	Adel Sellimi		(substituted on) 67'
FW	20	Ali Zitouni		(substituted on) 77'
MF	3	Zoubeir Baya		(substituted on) 88'
Manager:
Ammar Souayah

GK	1	Geert De Vlieger
RB	2	Éric Deflandre
CB	3	Glen De Boeck
CB	16	Daniel Van Buyten	(yellow card) 40'
LB	12	Peter Van Der Heyden
RM	11	Gert Verheyen		(substituted off) 46'
CM	18	Yves Vanderhaeghe
CM	6	Timmy Simons		(substituted off) 74'
LM	8	Bart Goor
CF	7	Marc Wilmots (c)
CF	20	Branko Strupar		(substituted off) 46'
Substitutions:
FW	9	Wesley Sonck		(substituted on) 46'
MF	14	Sven Vermant		(substituted on) 46'
FW	22	Mbo Mpenza		(substituted on) 74'
Manager:
Robert Waseige

Man of the Match:
Raouf Bouzaiene (Tunisia)

Assistant referees:
Paul Smith (New Zealand)
Komaleeswaran Sankar (India)
Fourth official:
Gilles Veissière (France)

=== Tunisia vs Japan ===
14 June 2002
15:30

Tunisia	0–2	Japan
		Morishima 48'; H. Nakata 75'

Nagai Stadium, Osaka
Attendance: 45,213
Referee: Gilles Veissière (France)

Tunisia	Japan

GK	1	Ali Boumnijel
RB	6	Hatem Trabelsi
CB	15	Radhi Jaïdi
CB	2	Khaled Badra (c)	(yellow card) 81'
LB	12	Raouf Bouzaiene		(substituted off) 78'
RM	21	Mourad Melki		(substituted off) 46'
CM	10	Kaies Ghodhbane
CM	18	Selim Ben Achour
CM	13	Riadh Bouazizi	(yellow card) 21'
LM	23	José Clayton		(substituted off) 61'
CF	5	Ziad Jaziri
Substitutions:
MF	3	Zoubeir Baya		(substituted on) 46'
MF	7	Imed Mhedhebi		(substituted on) 61'
FW	20	Ali Zitouni		(substituted on) 78'
Manager:
Ammar Souayah

GK	12	Seigo Narazaki
CB	3	Naoki Matsuda
CB	17	Tsuneyasu Miyamoto (c)
CB	16	Kōji Nakata
RM	20	Tomokazu Myojin
CM	21	Kazuyuki Toda
CM	7	Hidetoshi Nakata	(substituted off) 84'
CM	5	Junichi Inamoto	(substituted off) 46'
LM	18	Shinji Ono
CF	13	Atsushi Yanagisawa	(substituted off) 46'
CF	11	Takayuki Suzuki
Substitutions:
MF	8	Hiroaki Morishima	(substituted on) 46'
MF	22	Daisuke Ichikawa	(substituted on) 46'
MF	19	Mitsuo Ogasawara	(substituted on) 84'
Manager:
(France) Philippe Troussier

Man of the Match:
Hidetoshi Nakata (Japan)

Assistant referees:
Frédéric Arnault (France)
Haidar Koleit (Lebanon)
Fourth official:
René Ortubé (Bolivia)

=== Belgium vs Russia ===
14 June 2002
15:30

Belgium	3–2	Russia
Walem 7'; Sonck 78'; Wilmots 82'		Beschastnykh 52'; Sychev 88'

Shizuoka Ecopa Stadium, Fukuroi, Shizuoka
Attendance: 46,640
Referee: Kim Milton Nielsen (Denmark)

Belgium	Russia

GK	1	Geert De Vlieger
RB	15	Jacky Peeters
CB	3	Glen De Boeck		(substituted off) 90+2'
CB	16	Daniel Van Buyten
LB	5	Nico Van Kerckhoven
RM	11	Gert Verheyen		(substituted off) 78'
CM	18	Yves Vanderhaeghe	(yellow card) 39'
CM	10	Johan Walem
LM	8	Bart Goor
CF	7	Marc Wilmots (c)
CF	22	Mbo Mpenza		(substituted off) 70'
Substitutions:
FW	9	Wesley Sonck		(substituted on) 70'
MF	6	Timmy Simons		(substituted on) 78'
DF	4	Eric Van Meir		(substituted on) 90+2'
Manager:
Robert Waseige

GK	1	Ruslan Nigmatullin
RB	5	Andrei Solomatin	(yellow card) 12'
CB	3	Yuri Nikiforov		(substituted off) 43'
CB	7	Viktor Onopko (c)
LB	2	Yuri Kovtun
DM	21	Dmitri Khokhlov
RM	8	Valery Karpin		(substituted off) 82'
CM	4	Alexey Smertin	(yellow card) 14'	(substituted off) 34'
CM	9	Yegor Titov
LM	15	Dmitri Alenichev	(yellow card) 64'
CF	11	Vladimir Beschastnykh
Substitutions:
FW	22	Dmitri Sychev		(substituted on) 34'
DF	18	Dmitri Sennikov	(yellow card) 84'	(substituted on) 43'
FW	16	Aleksandr Kerzhakov		(substituted on) 82'
Manager:
Oleg Romantsev

Man of the Match:
Marc Wilmots (Belgium)

Assistant referees:
Philip Sharp (England)
Komaleeswaran Sankar (India)
Fourth official:
Pierluigi Collina (Italy)

== See also ==
- Belgium at the FIFA World Cup
- Japan at the FIFA World Cup
- Russia at the FIFA World Cup
- Tunisia at the FIFA World Cup
