= Peter Van der Heyden =

Belgian footballer

Personal information
- Date of birth: 16 July 1976 (age 50)
- Place of birth: Aalst, Belgium
- Height: 1.83 m (6 ft 0 in)
- Position: Left-back

Senior career*
Years	Team	Apps	(Gls)
1994–1998	F.C. Denderleeuw	63	(5)
1998–2000	Eendracht Aalst	57	(6)
2000–2005	Club Brugge	150	(8)
2005–2008	VfL Wolfsburg	43	(0)
2008–2010	Mainz 05	25	(1)
2010–2011	Club Brugge	40	(1)
2011–2012	Beerschot		
2012–2016	Knokke FC		
Total		378	(21)

International career
2001–2007	Belgium	21	(1)
- * Club domestic league appearances and goals

Peter Van der Heyden (born 16 July 1976) is a Belgian former professional footballer who played as a left-back.

== Club career ==
Van der Heyden was born in Aalst, East Flanders. His former clubs include F.C. Denderleeuw, Eendracht Aalst, VfL Wolfsburg and Mainz 05. On 21 January 2010, the Belgian Jupiler Pro League outfit Club Brugge signed him until 2011, it is his second spell at the club after previously being a squad member between 2000 and 2005.

== International career ==
Van der Heyden played 21 times with Belgium and was in the team for the 2002 World Cup. He scored Belgium's second goal in their opening match, a 2–2 draw with Japan in Saitama.

== Career statistics ==
=== International ===
Appearances and goals by national team and year
National team	Year	Apps	Goals
Belgium	2001	2	0
Belgium	2002	5	1
Belgium	2003	5	0
Belgium	2004	2	0
Belgium	2005	3	0
Belgium	2006	2	0
Belgium	2007	2	0
Total		21	1

Scores and results list Belgium's goal tally first, score column indicates score after each Van der Heyden goal.

List of international goals scored by Peter Van der Heyden
No.	Date	Venue	Opponent	Score	Result	Competition
1	4 June 2002	Saitama Stadium, Midori-ku, Japan	Japan	2–2	2–2	2002 FIFA World Cup

== Honours ==
Club Brugge

- Belgian First Division: 2002–03, 2004–05
- Belgian Cup: 2001–02, 2003–04; runners-up 2004–05
- Belgian Supercup: 2002, 2003, 2004
- Bruges Matins: 2000, 2001, 2004
- Jules Pappaert Cup: 2005

Belgium

- FIFA Fair Play Trophy: 2002 World Cup
