= 1998 FIFA World Cup Group H =

Football tournament group stage

Group H at the 1998 FIFA World Cup comprised CONMEBOL representatives Argentina, and three World Cup debutants: Croatia, competing from the UEFA confederation; Jamaica of CONCACAF; and Japan from the Asian Football Confederation.

Argentina qualified with a match to spare after they beat Japan and Jamaica with Gabriel Batistuta scoring in both games. Croatia did the same with Davor Šuker scoring in both games. Argentina then beat Croatia to take first place, while Jamaica got their first ever points in a World Cup finals tournament by beating Japan.

== Standings ==
Pos	Team	Pld	W	D	L	GF	GA	GD	Pts	Qualification
1	Argentina	3	3	0	0	7	0	+7	9	Advance to knockout stage
2	Croatia	3	2	0	1	4	2	+2	6	Advance to knockout stage
3	Jamaica	3	1	0	2	3	9	−6	3	
4	Japan	3	0	0	3	1	4	−3	0	

Source: FIFA
- Argentina advanced to play England (runner-up of Group G) in the round of 16.
- Croatia advanced to play Romania (winner of Group G) in the round of 16.

== Matches ==
=== Argentina vs Japan ===
14 June 1998
14:30 CEST (UTC+2)

Argentina	1–0	Japan
Batistuta 28'

Stade de Toulouse, Toulouse
Attendance: 33,500
Referee: Mario van der Ende (Netherlands)

Argentina	Japan

GK	1	Carlos Roa
RB	14	Nelson Vivas
CB	2	Roberto Ayala
CB	6	Roberto Sensini	(substituted off) 72'
LB	22	Javier Zanetti
DM	5	Matías Almeyda
CM	8	Diego Simeone (c)
CM	11	Juan Sebastián Verón
AM	10	Ariel Ortega
CF	7	Claudio López	(substituted off) 61'
CF	9	Gabriel Batistuta
Substitutions:
FW	18	Abel Balbo	(substituted on) 61'
DF	3	José Chamot	(substituted on) 72'
Manager:
Daniel Passarella

GK	20	Yoshikatsu Kawaguchi
CB	17	Yutaka Akita
CB	4	Masami Ihara (c)	(yellow card) 26'
CB	19	Eisuke Nakanishi	(yellow card) 67'
RM	2	Akira Narahashi
CM	6	Motohiro Yamaguchi
CM	10	Hiroshi Nanami
LM	3	Naoki Soma		(substituted off) 84'
AM	8	Hidetoshi Nakata
CF	9	Masashi Nakayama		(substituted off) 65'
CF	18	Shoji Jo
Substitutions:
FW	12	Wagner Lopes		(substituted on) 65'
MF	22	Takashi Hirano	(yellow card) 90+2'	(substituted on) 84'
Manager:
Takeshi Okada

Assistant referees:
Marc Van den Broeck (Belgium)
Eddie Foley (Republic of Ireland)
Fourth official:
Ryszard Wójcik (Polish)

=== Jamaica vs Croatia ===
To date, this is the last match in which both sides were playing their first ever FIFA World Cup fixture. It was the first time it had happened since 1974, when East Germany played Australia.

14 June 1998
21:00 CEST (UTC+2)

Jamaica	1–3	Croatia
Earle 45'		Stanić 27'; Prosinečki 53'; Šuker 69'

Stade Félix-Bollaert, Lens
Attendance: 38,100
Referee: Vítor Melo Pereira (Portugal)

Jamaica	Croatia

GK	1	Warren Barrett (c)
CB	19	Frank Sinclair
CB	7	Peter Cargill		(substituted off) 69'
CB	5	Ian Goodison
RM	6	Fitzroy Simpson
CM	11	Theodore Whitmore
CM	16	Robbie Earle		(substituted off) 74'
LM	15	Ricardo Gardner
RF	18	Deon Burton	(yellow card) 62'
CF	17	Onandi Lowe
LF	22	Paul Hall		(substituted off) 81'
Substitutions:
MF	20	Darryl Powell		(substituted on) 69'
FW	9	Andrew Williams		(substituted on) 74'
FW	10	Walter Boyd		(substituted on) 81'
Manager:
(Brazil) René Simões

GK	1	Dražen Ladić
CB	6	Slaven Bilić
CB	14	Zvonimir Soldo	(yellow card) 5'
CB	4	Igor Štimac
RWB	20	Dario Šimić	(yellow card) 59'	(substituted off) 74'
LWB	17	Robert Jarni
CM	8	Robert Prosinečki
CM	7	Aljoša Asanović
AM	10	Zvonimir Boban (c)
CF	13	Mario Stanić
CF	9	Davor Šuker
Substitutions:
FW	19	Goran Vlaović		(substituted on) 74'
Manager:
Miroslav Blažević

Assistant referees:
Nicolae Grigorescu (Romania)
Jacques Poudevigne (France)
Fourth official:
Bernd Heynemann (Germany)

=== Japan vs Croatia ===
20 June 1998
14:30 CEST (UTC+2)

Japan	0–1	Croatia
		Šuker 77'

Stade de la Beaujoire, Nantes
Attendance: 35,500
Referee: Ramesh Ramdhan (Trinidad and Tobago)

Japan	Croatia

GK	20	Yoshikatsu Kawaguchi
CB	17	Yutaka Akita	(yellow card) 89'
CB	4	Masami Ihara (c)
CB	19	Eisuke Nakanishi	(yellow card) 70'
RM	2	Akira Narahashi		(substituted off) 79'
CM	6	Motohiro Yamaguchi
CM	10	Hiroshi Nanami	(yellow card) 41'	(substituted off) 84'
LM	3	Naoki Soma
AM	8	Hidetoshi Nakata
CF	9	Masashi Nakayama		(substituted off) 61'
CF	18	Shoji Jo
Substitutions:
FW	14	Masayuki Okano		(substituted on) 61'
MF	15	Hiroaki Morishima		(substituted on) 79'
FW	12	Wagner Lopes		(substituted on) 84'
Manager:
Takeshi Okada

GK	1	Dražen Ladić
CB	6	Slaven Bilić
CB	14	Zvonimir Soldo
CB	4	Igor Štimac		(substituted off) 46'
RWB	20	Dario Šimić
LWB	17	Robert Jarni
DM	21	Krunoslav Jurčić
CM	8	Robert Prosinečki	(yellow card) 26'	(substituted off) 67'
CM	7	Aljoša Asanović
CF	13	Mario Stanić	(yellow card) 70'	(substituted off) 88'
CF	9	Davor Šuker (c)
Substitutions:
FW	19	Goran Vlaović		(substituted on) 46'
MF	11	Silvio Marić		(substituted on) 67'
DF	15	Igor Tudor		(substituted on) 88'
Manager:
Miroslav Blažević

Assistant referees:
Marere Gonzales (Trinidad and Tobago)
Achmat Salie (South Africa)
Fourth official:
Günter Benkö (Austria)

=== Argentina vs Jamaica ===
21 June 1998
17:30 CEST (UTC+2)

Argentina	5–0	Jamaica
Ortega 31', 55'; Batistuta 73', 78', 83' (pen.)

Parc des Princes, Paris
Attendance: 45,500
Referee: Rune Pedersen (Norway)

Argentina	Jamaica

GK	1	Carlos Roa
RB	22	Javier Zanetti
CB	2	Roberto Ayala
CB	6	Roberto Sensini		(substituted off) 25'
LB	3	José Chamot	(yellow card) 65'
DM	5	Matías Almeyda
CM	8	Diego Simeone (c)		(substituted off) 80'
CM	11	Juan Sebastián Verón
AM	10	Ariel Ortega
CF	7	Claudio López		(substituted off) 75'
CF	9	Gabriel Batistuta
Substitutions:
DF	14	Nelson Vivas		(substituted on) 25'
MF	20	Marcelo Gallardo		(substituted on) 75'
DF	4	Mauricio Pineda		(substituted on) 80'
Manager:
Daniel Passarella

GK	1	Warren Barrett (c)
DF	2	Stephen Malcolm		(substituted off) 62'
DF	3	Chris Dawes
DF	5	Ian Goodison
MF	6	Fitzroy Simpson
MF	11	Theodore Whitmore		(substituted off) 73'
DF	15	Ricardo Gardner
FW	18	Deon Burton		(substituted off) 46'
DF	19	Frank Sinclair
MF	20	Darryl Powell	(yellow card) 4' (yellow-red card) 45+1'
FW	22	Paul Hall
Substitutions:
DF	7	Peter Cargill	(yellow card) 88'	(substituted on) 46'
FW	10	Walter Boyd		(substituted on) 62'
MF	16	Robbie Earle		(substituted on) 73'
Manager:
(Brazil) René Simões

Assistant referees:
Mikael Nilsson (Sweden)
Gennaro Mazzei (Italy)
Fourth official:
Pierluigi Collina (Italy)

=== Argentina vs Croatia ===
26 June 1998
16:00 CEST (UTC+2)

Argentina	1–0	Croatia
Pineda 36'

Parc Lescure, Bordeaux
Attendance: 31,800
Referee: Said Belqola (Morocco)

Argentina	Croatia

GK	1	Carlos Roa
RB	14	Nelson Vivas	(yellow card) 68'
CB	2	Roberto Ayala	(yellow card) 35'
CB	13	Pablo Paz
LB	4	Mauricio Pineda
DM	22	Javier Zanetti		(substituted off) 67'
DM	5	Matías Almeyda
CM	11	Juan Sebastián Verón
AM	10	Ariel Ortega	(yellow card) 23'	(substituted off) 52'
AM	20	Marcelo Gallardo		(substituted off) 80'
CF	9	Gabriel Batistuta (c)
Substitutions:
FW	7	Claudio López		(substituted on) 52'
MF	8	Diego Simeone		(substituted on) 67'
MF	16	Sergio Berti		(substituted on) 80'
Manager:
Daniel Passarella

GK	1	Dražen Ladić
CB	20	Dario Šimić
CB	6	Slaven Bilić	(yellow card) 20'
CB	14	Zvonimir Soldo	(yellow card) 43'
RWB	11	Silvio Marić		(substituted off) 46'
LWB	17	Robert Jarni	(yellow card) 58'
CM	8	Robert Prosinečki		(substituted off) 67'
CM	7	Aljoša Asanović
AM	10	Zvonimir Boban (c)	(yellow card) 47'
CF	13	Mario Stanić
CF	9	Davor Šuker
Substitutions:
FW	19	Goran Vlaović		(substituted on) 46'
DF	4	Igor Štimac		(substituted on) 67'
Manager:
Miroslav Blažević

Assistant referees:
Aristidis Chris Soldatos (South Africa)
Mohamed Mansri (Tunisia)
Fourth official:
An-Yan Lim Kee Chong (Mauritius)

=== Japan vs Jamaica ===
26 June 1998
16:00 CEST (UTC+2)

Japan	1–2	Jamaica
Nakayama 74'		Whitmore 39', 54'

Stade de Gerland, Lyon
Attendance: 39,100
Referee: Günter Benkö (Austria)

Japan	Jamaica

GK	20	Yoshikatsu Kawaguchi
CB	17	Yutaka Akita
CB	4	Masami Ihara (c)
CB	5	Norio Omura		(substituted off) 58'
RM	2	Akira Narahashi
CM	6	Motohiro Yamaguchi	(yellow card) 4'
CM	10	Hiroshi Nanami		(substituted off) 78'
LM	3	Naoki Soma
AM	8	Hidetoshi Nakata
CF	9	Masashi Nakayama
CF	18	Shoji Jo		(substituted off) 58'
Substitutions:
FW	12	Wagner Lopes		(substituted on) 58'
MF	22	Takashi Hirano		(substituted on) 58'
MF	11	Shinji Ono		(substituted on) 78'
Manager:
Takeshi Okada

GK	13	Aaron Lawrence
DF	2	Stephen Malcolm	(yellow card) 78'
DF	3	Chris Dawes	(yellow card) 88'
DF	5	Ian Goodison (c)
MF	6	Fitzroy Simpson		(substituted off) 89'
FW	8	Marcus Gayle		(substituted off) 80'
MF	11	Theodore Whitmore
DF	15	Ricardo Gardner
FW	17	Onandi Lowe
DF	19	Frank Sinclair
FW	22	Paul Hall		(substituted off) 72'
Substitutions:
FW	10	Walter Boyd		(substituted on) 72'
FW	18	Deon Burton		(substituted on) 80'
MF	16	Robbie Earle		(substituted on) 89'
Manager:
(Brazil) René Simões

Assistant referees:
Evžen Amler (Czech Republic)
Dramane Danté (Mali)
Fourth official:
Hugh Dallas (Scotland)

== See also ==
- Argentina at the FIFA World Cup
- Croatia at the FIFA World Cup
- Jamaica at the FIFA World Cup
- Japan at the FIFA World Cup
