= 2026 FIFA World Cup Group I =

Group I of the 2026 FIFA World Cup took place from June 16 to 26, 2026. The group consisted of France, Senegal, Iraq, and Norway.

France and Norway secured their spots in the round of 32 after two group game wins each, with France topping the group after defeating Norway in their final group game.

Senegal finished third with a decisive victory over Iraq, allowing them to advance as one of the eight best third-place teams. Iraq were eliminated after losing all three of their group stage matches, and they finished last in the World Cup based on goal difference.

Additionally, this edition marked Iraq’s return to the tournament after only appearing in 1986, France played its first ever World Cup on U.S. soil after having missed the 1994 edition and Norway also returning since 1998.

== Teams ==
Draw position	Team	Pot	Confederation	Method of qualification	Date of qualification	Finals appearance	Last appearance	Previous best performance	FIFA Rankings	
Draw position	Team	Pot	Confederation	Method of qualification	Date of qualification	Finals appearance	Last appearance	Previous best performance	November 2025 (Note: The rankings of November 2025 were used for seeding for the final draw.)	June 2026
I1	France	1	UEFA	UEFA Group D winner	November 13, 2025	17th	2022	Winner (1998, 2018)	3	3
I2	Senegal	2	CAF	CAF Group B winner	October 14, 2025	4th	2022	Quarterfinals (2002)	19	15
I3	Iraq	4 (Note: As the identity of the inter-confederation playoff Path 2 winner was not known at the time of the final draw, positions in the FIFA Rankings were not taken into account, and the placeholder in the draw was automatically seeded into pot 4.)	AFC	Inter-confederation playoff Path 2 winner	March 31, 2026	2nd	1986	Group stage (1986)	58	57
I4	Norway	3	UEFA	UEFA Group I winner	November 16, 2025	4th	1998	Round of 16 (1998)	29	31

== Standings ==
Pos	Team	Pld	W	D	L	GF	GA	GD	Pts	Qualification
1	France	3	3	0	0	10	2	+8	9	Advance to knockout stage
2	Norway	3	2	0	1	8	7	+1	6	Advance to knockout stage
3	Senegal	3	1	0	2	8	6	+2	3	Advance to knockout stage
4	Iraq	3	0	0	3	1	12	−11	0	

Source: FIFA
Rules for classification: Group stage tiebreakers

In the round of 32:

- The winner of Group I, France, advanced to play the third-place team of Group F, Sweden.
- The runner-up of Group I, Norway, advanced to play the runner-up of Group E, Ivory Coast.
- The third-place team of Group I, Senegal, advanced to play the winner of Group G, Belgium, as one of the eight best third-place teams from the group stage.

== Matches ==
All times listed are local, UTC−4 (EDT).

=== France vs Senegal ===
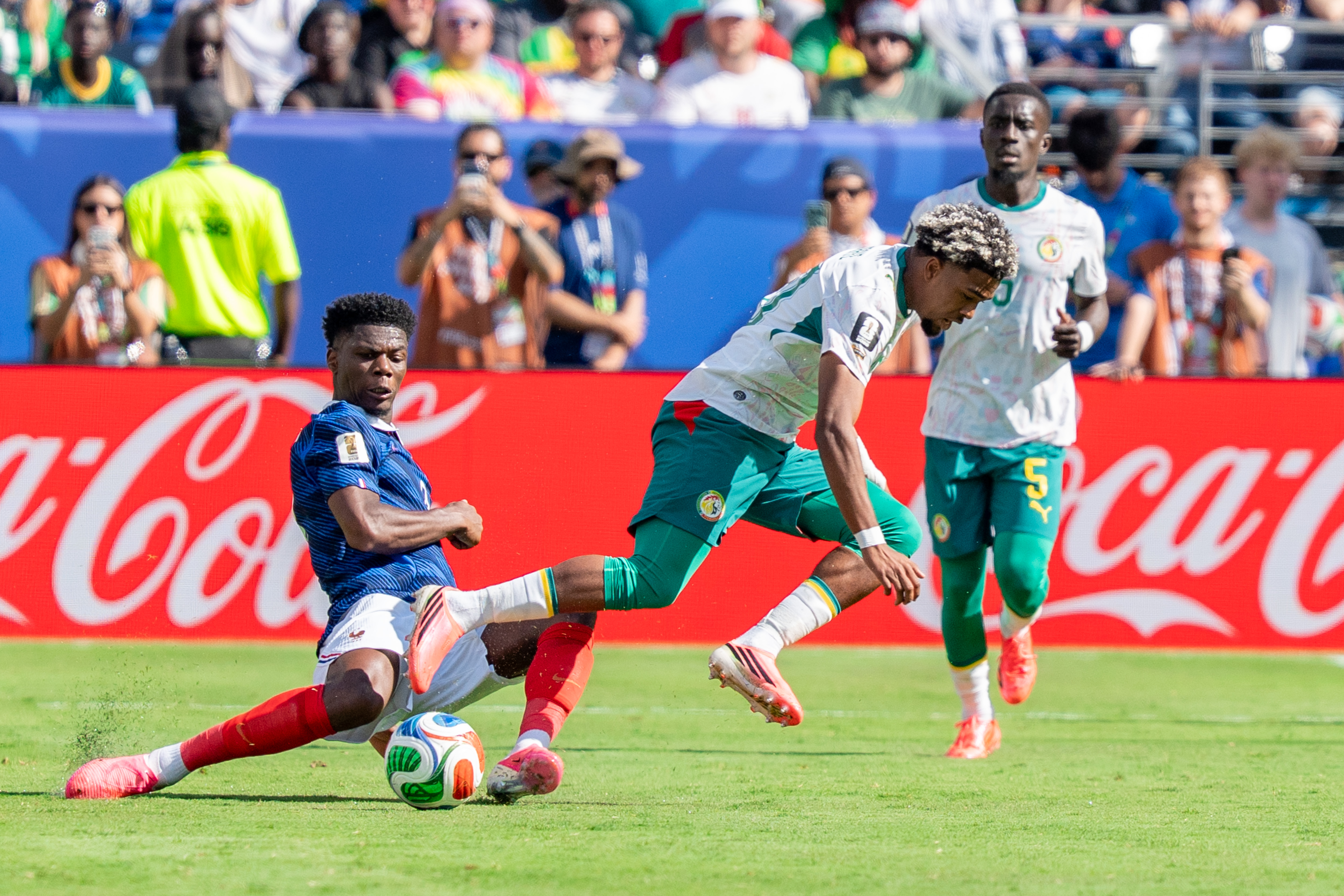
Midway in the match between France and Senegal

The teams had only met once prior, when Senegal defeated defending champions France 1–0 in a major upset at the opening match of the 2002 FIFA World Cup.

In the first half, Nicolas Jackson hit the post with a low shot from the left that came back off French goalkeeper Mike Maignan's leg and out for a corner. Just before half-time Ismaïla Sarr shot over the bar from six yards out after a low cross from Sadio Mané on the left.

In the second half, Mané appeared to catch Kylian Mbappé inside the box but after a VAR review no penalty was given. In the 66th minute, Mbappé made it 1–0 when he finished with a low right foot first time shot to the left corner from the right after a pass from Michael Olise. In the 82nd minute, Substitute Bradley Barcola ran onto a pass from Adrien Rabiot before chipping the ball over Édouard Mendy and into the net from the right to make it 2–0. In the 95th minute, Senegal pulled a goal back when substitute Ibrahim Mbaye scored with a shot from a tight angle on the right which French goalkeeper Mike Maignan got his hands to but couldn't prevent from going high into the net. A minute later, Mbappé got his second goal and France's third with a right foot shot from 30 yards out into the left of the net. In scoring his second goal of the game, Mbappé became the highest scorer in France's history with 58 goals.

June 16, 2026
3:00 p.m.

France	3–1	Senegal
Mbappé 66', 90+6'; Barcola 82'	(Note: "France vs Senegal | First Stage | FIFA World Cup 2026". FIFA. Retrieved June 16, 2026.; "Match Report – Group I – France v. Senegal". FIFA. Retrieved June 16, 2026.; "Post match summary report – Group I – France v. Senegal". FIFA. June 16, 2026. Retrieved June 17, 2026.)	Mbaye 90+5'

MetLife Stadium, East Rutherford
Attendance: 80,545
Referee: Alireza Faghani (Australia)

France	Senegal

GK	16	Mike Maignan
RB	5	Jules Koundé
CB	4	Dayot Upamecano
CB	17	William Saliba
LB	19	Théo Hernandez
CM	8	Aurélien Tchouaméni
CM	14	Adrien Rabiot
RW	11	Michael Olise
AM	7	Ousmane Dembélé	(substituted off) 80'
LW	20	Désiré Doué	(substituted off) 87'
CF	10	Kylian Mbappé (c)
Substitutions:
FW	12	Bradley Barcola	(substituted on) 80'
MF	24	Rayan Cherki	(substituted on) 87'
Manager:
Didier Deschamps

GK	16	Édouard Mendy
RB	15	Krépin Diatta
CB	3	Kalidou Koulibaly (c)
CB	19	Moussa Niakhaté
LB	25	El Hadji Malick Diouf
CM	8	Lamine Camara	(substituted off) 75'
CM	5	Idrissa Gueye	(substituted off) 88'
CM	26	Pape Gueye	(substituted off) 83'
RF	18	Ismaïla Sarr	(substituted off) 75'
CF	11	Nicolas Jackson	(substituted off) 83'
LF	10	Sadio Mané
Substitutions:
FW	20	Ibrahim Mbaye	(substituted on) 75'
MF	21	Habib Diarra	(substituted on) 75'
FW	13	Iliman Ndiaye	(substituted on) 83'
FW	9	Bamba Dieng	(substituted on) 83'
MF	6	Pathé Ciss	(substituted on) 88'
Manager:
Pape Thiaw

Man of the Match:
Michael Olise (France)

Assistant referees:
George Lakrindis (Australia)
James Lindsay (Australia)
Fourth official:
Sandro Schärer (Switzerland)
Reserve assistant referee:
Stéphane De Almeida (Switzerland)
Video assistant referee:
Abdullah Al-Shehri (Saudi Arabia)
Assistant video assistant referee:
Armando Villarreal (United States)
Support video assistant referee:
Tatiana Guzmán (Nicaragua)

=== Iraq vs Norway ===
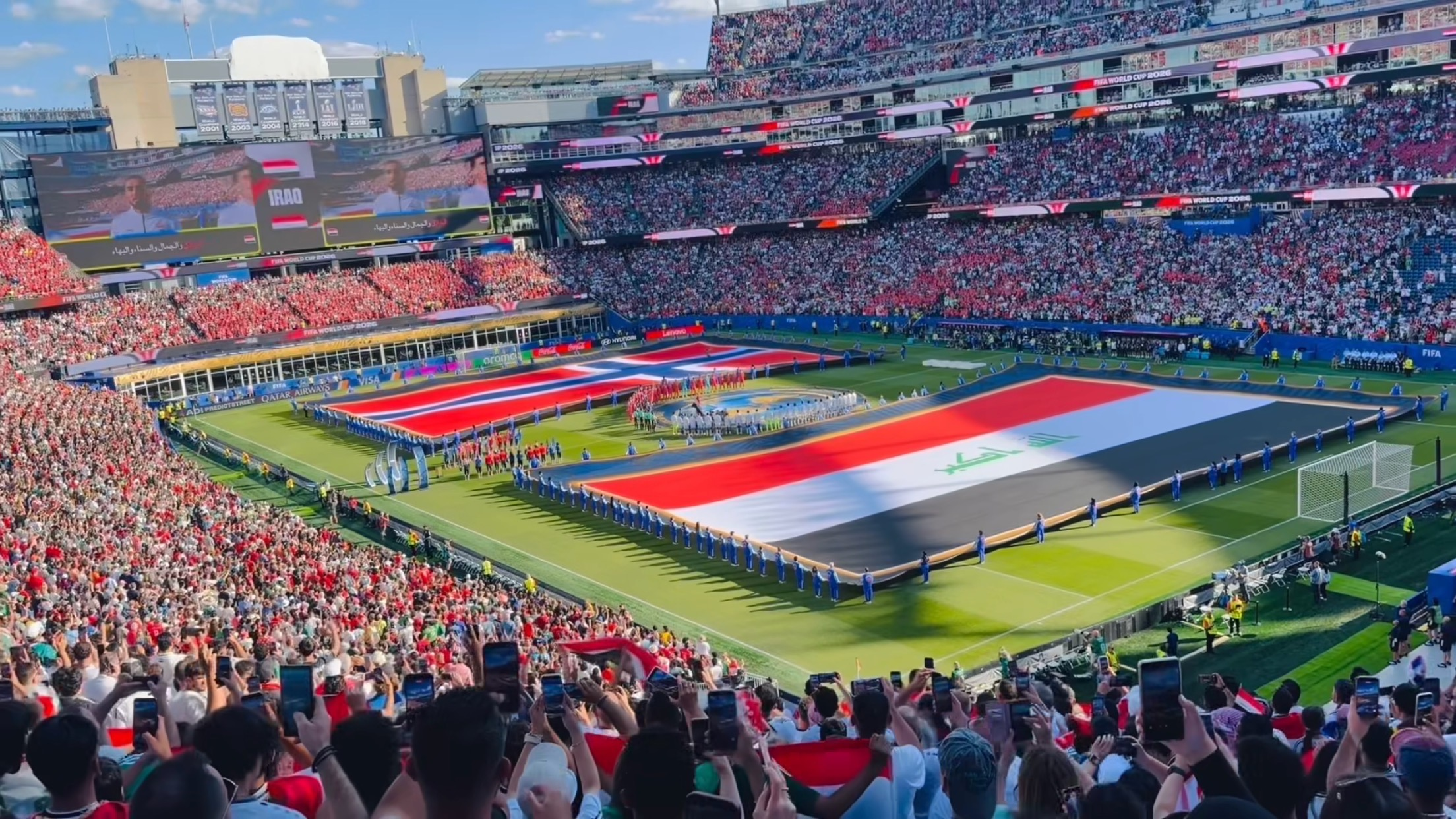
Pre-match anthems of Iraq and Norway

The two teams had never met before. The fixture marked the return of Iraq and Norway to the World Cup finals, their first appearances since 1986 and 1998 respectively.

In the 29th minute, Norway went in front when Erling Haaland slid in to score at the back post from close range after a low cross from the left by David Møller Wolfe. Iraq got an equaliser in the 39th minute when Aymen Hussein headed into the right of the net from six yards out after a cross from the left by Amir Al-Ammari. Haaland put Norway back in front four minutes later when he chased down a back-pass to Iraq goalkeeper Jalal Hassan with the ball hitting him from the goalkeeper's kick into the net.

In the 76th minute, Norway went 3–1 in front when Leo Østigård scored with a near-post header to the net after a corner from Martin Odegaard on the right. Norway got a fourth goal in the 6th minute of added time when Haaland's looping header across goal was deflected by Aymen Hussein at the back post into his own net for an own goal.

June 16, 2026
6:00 p.m.

Iraq	1–4	Norway
Hussein 39'	(Note: "Iraq vs Norway | First Stage | FIFA World Cup 2026". FIFA. Retrieved June 16, 2026.; "Match Report – Group I – Iraq v. Norway". FIFA. Retrieved June 17, 2026.; "Post match summary report – Group I – Iraq v. Norway". FIFA. June 16, 2026. Retrieved June 17, 2026.)	Haaland 29', 43'; Østigård 76'; Hussein 90+6' (o.g.)

Gillette Stadium, Foxborough
Attendance: 63,106
Referee: Pierre Atcho (Gabon)

Iraq	Norway

GK	12	Jalal Hassan (c)
RB	3	Hussein Ali		(substituted off) 73'
CB	4	Zaid Tahseen	(yellow card) 86'
CB	5	Akam Hashim
LB	23	Merchas Doski
RM	8	Ibrahim Bayesh		(substituted off) 78'
CM	24	Zaid Ismail		(substituted off) 59'
CM	16	Amir Al-Ammari
LM	17	Ali Jasim		(substituted off) 73'
CF	18	Aymen Hussein
CF	9	Ali Al-Hamadi		(substituted off) 59'
Substitutions:
MF	21	Marko Farji		(substituted on) 59'
MF	14	Zidane Iqbal		(substituted on) 59'
DF	25	Mustafa Saadoon		(substituted on) 73'
MF	11	Ahmed Qasem		(substituted on) 73'
FW	10	Mohanad Ali		(substituted on) 78'
Manager:
(Australia) Graham Arnold

GK	1	Ørjan Nyland
RB	26	Julian Ryerson
CB	3	Kristoffer Ajer
CB	17	Torbjørn Heggem
LB	5	David Møller Wolfe	(substituted off) 73'
DM	8	Sander Berge
CM	10	Martin Ødegaard (c)	(substituted off) 81'
CM	14	Fredrik Aursnes	(substituted off) 73'
RF	7	Alexander Sørloth	(substituted off) 73'
CF	9	Erling Haaland
LF	20	Antonio Nusa	(substituted off) 73'
Substitutions:
DF	4	Leo Østigård	(substituted on) 73'
MF	18	Kristian Thorstvedt	(substituted on) 73'
MF	21	Andreas Schjelderup	(substituted on) 73'
MF	22	Oscar Bobb	(substituted on) 73'
MF	6	Patrick Berg	(substituted on) 81'
Manager:
Ståle Solbakken

Man of the Match:
Erling Haaland (Norway)

Assistant referees:
Boris Ditsoga (Gabon)
Amos Abeigne Ndong (Gabon)
Fourth official:
Amin Omar (Egypt)
Reserve assistant referee:
Mahmoud Abouregal (Egypt)
Video assistant referee:
Guillermo Pacheco (Mexico)
Assistant video assistant referee:
Hamza El Fariq (Morocco)
Support video assistant referee:
Jarred Gillett (England)

=== France vs Iraq ===
The two teams had never met before.

At 6:01 p.m., during the halftime break, the match was interrupted due to adverse weather conditions (thunderstorm and lightning alert). The match resumed at 8:00 p.m., and as a result, the second half was played concurrently with the first half of Norway vs Senegal in nearby New York−New Jersey.

With Iraq's second defeat, they now have to face Senegal in their third and final match, who also suffered two straight defeats.

June 22, 2026
5:00 p.m.

France	3–0	Iraq
Mbappé 14', 54'; Dembélé 66'	(Note: "France vs Iraq | First Stage | FIFA World Cup 2026". FIFA. Retrieved June 23, 2026.; "Match Report – Group I – France v. Iraq". FIFA. June 23, 2026. Retrieved June 23, 2026.; "Post match summary report – Group I – France v. Iraq". FIFA. June 23, 2026. Retrieved June 23, 2026.)

Lincoln Financial Field, Philadelphia
Attendance: 68,324
Referee: Drew Fischer (Canada)

France	Iraq

GK	16	Mike Maignan
RB	5	Jules Koundé	(substituted off) 83'
CB	4	Dayot Upamecano
CB	17	William Saliba
LB	3	Lucas Digne
CM	6	Manu Koné
CM	14	Adrien Rabiot
RW	7	Ousmane Dembélé	(substituted off) 68'
AM	11	Michael Olise	(substituted off) 68'
LW	12	Bradley Barcola	(substituted off) 83'
CF	10	Kylian Mbappé (c)	(substituted off) 90+1'
Substitutions:
FW	20	Désiré Doué	(substituted on) 68'
MF	24	Rayan Cherki	(substituted on) 68'
MF	25	Maghnes Akliouche	(substituted on) 83'
DF	2	Malo Gusto	(substituted on) 83'
FW	9	Marcus Thuram	(substituted on) 90+1'
Manager:
Didier Deschamps

GK	22	Ahmed Basil
RB	3	Hussein Ali
CB	4	Zaid Tahseen		(substituted off) 60'
CB	5	Akam Hashim
LB	23	Merchas Doski
CM	24	Zaid Ismail		(substituted off) 60'
CM	16	Amir Al-Ammari	(yellow card) 6'	(substituted off) 68'
RW	11	Ahmed Qasem
AM	14	Zidane Iqbal
LW	8	Ibrahim Bayesh		(substituted off) 68'
CF	18	Aymen Hussein (c)		(substituted off) 26'
Substitutions:
FW	9	Ali Al-Hamadi		(substituted on) 26'
DF	2	Rebin Sulaka		(substituted on) 60'
MF	7	Youssef Amyn		(substituted on) 60'
MF	20	Aimar Sher		(substituted on) 68'
MF	21	Marko Farji		(substituted on) 68'
Manager:
(Australia) Graham Arnold

Man of the Match:
Kylian Mbappé (France)

Assistant referees:
Micheal Barwegen (Canada)
Lyes Arfa (Canada)
Fourth official:
Sandro Schärer (Switzerland)
Reserve assistant referee:
Stéphane De Almeida (Switzerland)
Video assistant referee:
Joe Dickerson (United States)
Assistant video assistant referee:
Antonio García (Uruguay)
Support video assistant referee:
Juan Soto (Venezuela)

=== Norway vs Senegal ===
The teams previously faced each other once in 2006, a friendly won 2–1 by Senegal.

Erling Haaland dominated the match throughout, scoring two goals, and overwhelming the promising Senegalese team altogether, with Marcus Holmgren Pedersen having scored first in the 43rd minute. This win was enough for Norway to secure their spot to the round of 32.

June 22, 2026
8:00 p.m.

Norway	3–2	Senegal
Pedersen 43'; Haaland 48', 58'	(Note: "Norway vs Senegal | First Stage | FIFA World Cup 2026". FIFA. Retrieved June 23, 2026.; "Match Report – Group I – Norway v. Senegal". FIFA. June 23, 2026. Retrieved June 23, 2026.; "Post match summary report – Group I – Norway v. Senegal". FIFA. June 23, 2026. Retrieved June 23, 2026.)	I. Sarr 53', 90+3'

MetLife Stadium, East Rutherford
Attendance: 80,663
Referee: Wilton Sampaio (Brazil)

Norway	Senegal

GK	1	Ørjan Nyland
RB	26	Julian Ryerson	(substituted off) 13'
CB	3	Kristoffer Ajer
CB	17	Torbjørn Heggem	(substituted off) 84'
LB	5	David Møller Wolfe
DM	8	Sander Berge
CM	10	Martin Ødegaard (c)
CM	14	Fredrik Aursnes	(substituted off) 46'
RF	7	Alexander Sørloth	(substituted off) 84'
CF	9	Erling Haaland
LF	20	Antonio Nusa	(substituted off) 71'
Substitutions:
DF	16	Marcus Holmgren Pedersen	(substituted on) 13'
MF	6	Patrick Berg	(substituted on) 46'
MF	21	Andreas Schjelderup	(substituted on) 71'
MF	22	Oscar Bobb	(substituted on) 84'
DF	4	Leo Østigård	(substituted on) 84'
Manager:
Ståle Solbakken

GK	16	Édouard Mendy	(substituted off) 63'
RB	15	Krépin Diatta
CB	3	Kalidou Koulibaly (c)	(substituted off) 72'
CB	19	Moussa Niakhaté
LB	25	El Hadji Malick Diouf	(substituted off) 54'
CM	8	Lamine Camara	(substituted off) 63'
CM	5	Idrissa Gueye
CM	26	Pape Gueye	(substituted off) 54'
RF	18	Ismaïla Sarr
CF	11	Nicolas Jackson
LF	10	Sadio Mané
Substitutions:
FW	20	Ibrahim Mbaye	(substituted on) 54'
DF	14	Ismail Jakobs	(substituted on) 54'
MF	6	Pathé Ciss	(substituted on) 63'
GK	23	Mory Diaw	(substituted on) 63'
MF	17	Pape Matar Sarr	(substituted on) 72'
Manager:
Pape Thiaw

Man of the Match:
Erling Haaland (Norway)

Assistant referees:
Bruno Pires (Brazil)
Bruno Boschilia (Brazil)
Fourth official:
Campbell-Kirk Kawana-Waugh (New Zealand)
Reserve assistant referee:
Isaac Trevis (New Zealand)
Video assistant referee:
Rodolpho Toski (Brazil)
Assistant video assistant referee:
Juan Lara (Chile)
Support video assistant referee:
Tomasz Kwiatkowski (Poland)

=== Norway vs France ===
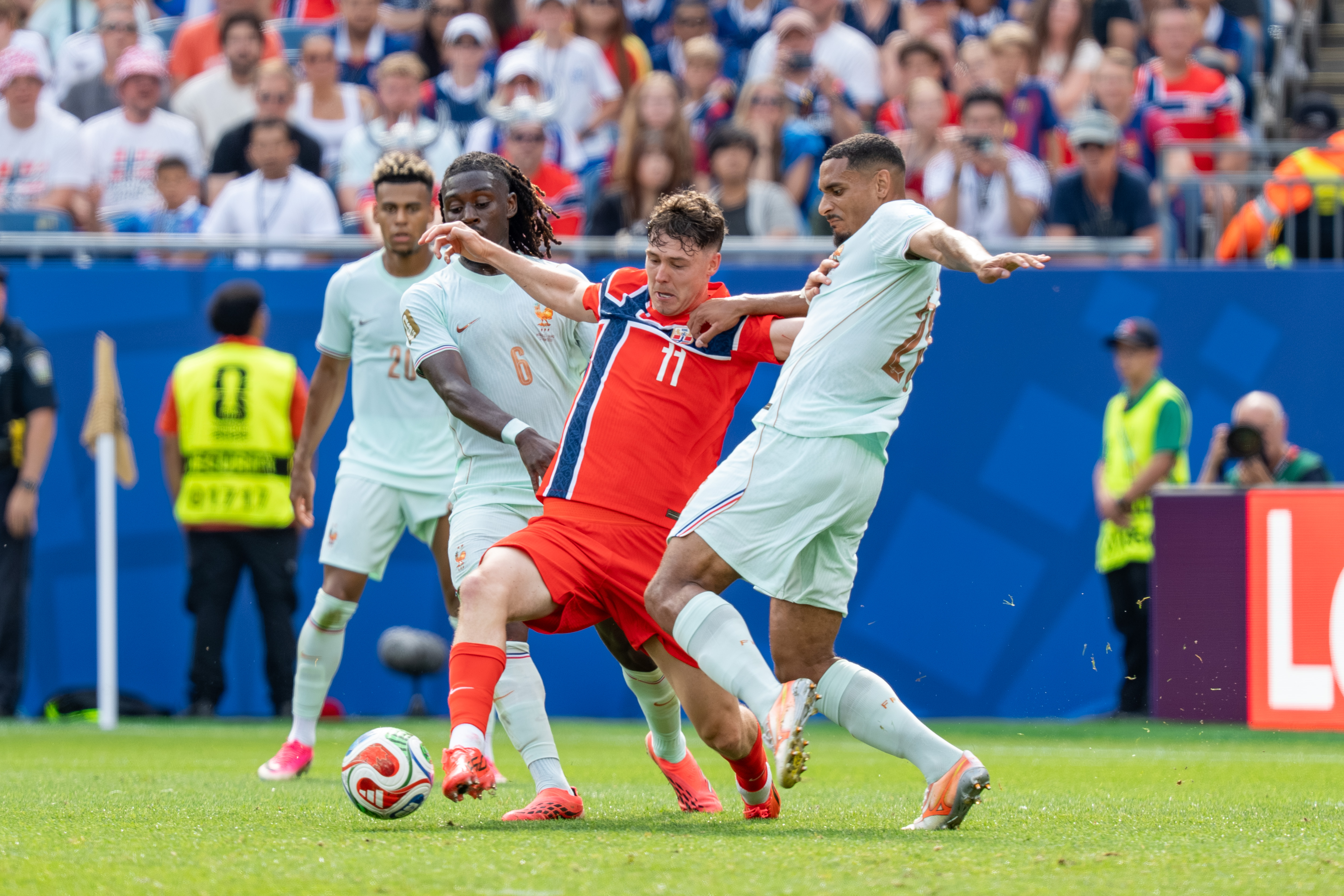
During the match between Norway and France.

The teams had previously faced each other 16 times, most recently in 2014, a 4–0 win for France in a friendly match.

Before kick-off, Norway coach Ståle Solbakken decided to rest 10 of his first-team players, including Erling Haaland and Martin Ødegaard, as Norway had already qualified for the knockout stage following their win against Senegal.

This marked the first time in World Cup history that Norway lost to an opponent other than Italy, who failed to qualify after finishing behind Norway in their qualifying group and subsequently losing on penalties to Bosnia and Herzegovina in the play-off final.

By scoring three goals within the first 32 minutes, Ousmane Dembélé became the second-fastest hat-trick scorer in tournament history, trailing only Erich Probst of Austria, who completed his in 24 minutes against Czechoslovakia in 1954, and the first player to score a first-half hat-trick since Oleg Salenko for Russia in 1994 against Cameroon. In addition, Dembélé became the third French player to score a hat-trick in a World Cup match, after Just Fontaine in 1958 and Kylian Mbappé in 2022.

Following this result, France advanced as Group I winners while Norway qualified as runners-up, with the final standings heavily influenced by Norway's defensive errors and inconsistent performances.

June 26, 2026
3:00 p.m.

Norway	1–4	France
Aasgaard 21'	(Note: "Norway vs France | First Stage | FIFA World Cup 2026". FIFA. Retrieved June 26, 2026.; "Match Report – Group I – Norway v. France". FIFA. June 26, 2026. Retrieved June 26, 2026.; "Post match summary report – Group I – Norway v. France". FIFA. June 26, 2026. Retrieved June 27, 2026.)	Dembélé 7', 20', 32'; Doué 90+4'

Gillette Stadium, Foxborough
Attendance: 64,146
Referee: Michael Oliver (England)

Norway	France

GK	13	Egil Selvik
RB	14	Fredrik Aursnes
CB	25	Henrik Falchener		(substituted off) 66'
CB	4	Leo Østigård
LB	15	Fredrik André Bjørkan		(substituted off) 46'
DM	6	Patrick Berg (c)	(yellow card) 10'
CM	18	Kristian Thorstvedt		(substituted off) 46'
CM	19	Thelo Aasgaard
RF	22	Oscar Bobb		(substituted off) 83'
CF	11	Jørgen Strand Larsen
LF	21	Andreas Schjelderup		(substituted off) 83'
Substitutions:
MF	2	Morten Thorsby		(substituted on) 46'
DF	16	Marcus Holmgren Pedersen		(substituted on) 46'
DF	24	Sondre Langås		(substituted on) 66'
MF	23	Jens Petter Hauge		(substituted on) 83'
MF	20	Antonio Nusa		(substituted on) 83'
Manager:
Ståle Solbakken

GK	16	Mike Maignan
RB	5	Jules Koundé		(substituted off) 86'
CB	4	Dayot Upamecano		(substituted off) 76'
CB	26	Maxence Lacroix
LB	19	Théo Hernandez
CM	8	Aurélien Tchouaméni	(yellow card) 74'
CM	6	Manu Koné
RW	7	Ousmane Dembélé		(substituted off) 65'
AM	11	Michael Olise		(substituted off) 65'
LW	20	Désiré Doué
CF	10	Kylian Mbappé (c)		(substituted off) 86'
Substitutions:
FW	12	Bradley Barcola		(substituted on) 65'
MF	24	Rayan Cherki		(substituted on) 65'
DF	15	Ibrahima Konaté		(substituted on) 76'
FW	22	Jean-Philippe Mateta		(substituted on) 86'
DF	2	Malo Gusto		(substituted on) 86'
Manager:
Guy Stéphan (Note: France manager Didier Deschamps was not present for the match against Norway in order to attend the funeral of his mother in France. Assistant manager Guy Stéphan filled in as head coach.)

Man of the Match:
Ousmane Dembélé (France)

Assistant referees:
Stuart Burt (England)
James Mainwaring (England)
Fourth official:
Ma Ning (China)
Reserve assistant referee:
Zhou Fei (China)
Video assistant referee:
Jarred Gillett (England)
Assistant video assistant referee:
Bram Van Driessche (Belgium)
Support video assistant referee:
Abdullah Al-Shehri (Saudi Arabia)

=== Senegal vs Iraq ===
The two teams had never met before. This was the only match in Group I held outside of the United States.

The match was considered decisive, as both Senegal and Iraq had already lost two consecutive matches. A win for either team would secure a third-place finish in the group and a chance to proceed to the round of 32 as one of the best third-placed teams, though their qualification would still depend on the results of third-placed teams in other groups.

With this result, Senegal became the first African team to score five goals in a single FIFA World Cup match, surpassing Algeria's 4–2 win over South Korea in 2014. This allowed Senegal to advance to the round of 32 as one of the eight best third-place teams, and the only one to progress with just three points.

Iraq were eliminated from the tournament following three consecutive defeats. This brought their overall historical record to six losses across two World Cup appearances, leaving them entirely winless since returning to the competition after a 40-year absence.

Additionally, it marked the joint second-largest defeat suffered by an Asian team during the tournament's group stage, following Qatar's 6–0 loss to Canada and tied with Uzbekistan's 5–0 loss to Portugal 3 days earlier in Houston.

June 26, 2026
3:00 p.m.

Senegal	5–0	Iraq
Diarra 4'; I. Sarr 56'; P. Gueye 59', 71'; I. Ndiaye 82'	(Note: "Senegal vs Iraq | First Stage | FIFA World Cup 2026". FIFA. Retrieved June 26, 2026.; "Match Report – Group I – Senegal v. Iraq". FIFA. June 26, 2026. Retrieved June 26, 2026.; "Post match summary report – Group I – Senegal v. Iraq". FIFA. June 26, 2026. Retrieved June 27, 2026.)

BMO Field, Toronto
Attendance: 43,036
Referee: Anthony Taylor (England)

Senegal	Iraq

GK	23	Mory Diaw
RB	15	Krépin Diatta
CB	4	Abdoulaye Seck	(yellow card) 18'	(substituted off) 58'
CB	19	Moussa Niakhaté
LB	14	Ismail Jakobs
DM	5	Idrissa Gueye (c)
CM	21	Habib Diarra		(substituted off) 56'
CM	8	Lamine Camara		(substituted off) 56'
RF	20	Ibrahim Mbaye		(substituted off) 56'
CF	18	Ismaïla Sarr		(substituted off) 81'
LF	10	Sadio Mané
Substitutions:
FW	11	Nicolas Jackson		(substituted on) 56'
FW	13	Iliman Ndiaye		(substituted on) 56'
MF	26	Pape Gueye	(yellow card) 81'	(substituted on) 56'
MF	6	Pathé Ciss		(substituted on) 58'
FW	7	Assane Diao		(substituted on) 81'
Manager:
Pape Thiaw

GK	22	Ahmed Basil		(substituted off) 46'
RB	26	Frans Putros
CB	2	Rebin Sulaka	(red card) 13'
CB	5	Akam Hashim
LB	23	Merchas Doski	(yellow card) 90'
RM	11	Ahmed Qasem		(substituted off) 16'
CM	14	Zidane Iqbal		(substituted off) 67'
CM	16	Amir Al-Ammari	(yellow card) 75'
LM	8	Ibrahim Bayesh (c)
CF	9	Ali Al-Hamadi		(substituted off) 57'
CF	17	Ali Jasim		(substituted off) 57'
Substitutions:
DF	6	Manaf Younis		(substituted on) 16'
GK	12	Jalal Hassan		(substituted on) 46'
DF	15	Ahmed Maknzi		(substituted on) 57'
FW	13	Ali Yousif		(substituted on) 57'
MF	19	Kevin Yakob		(substituted on) 67'
Manager:
(Australia) Graham Arnold

Man of the Match:
Pape Gueye (Senegal)

Assistant referees:
Gary Beswick (England)
Adam Nunn (England)
Fourth official:
Khalid Al-Turais (Saudi Arabia)
Reserve assistant referee:
Mohammed Al-Bakry (Saudi Arabia)
Video assistant referee:
Ivan Bebek (Croatia)
Assistant video assistant referee:
Fedayi San (Switzerland)
Support video assistant referee:
Carlos del Cerro Grande (Spain)

== Discipline ==
The team conduct ("fair play") score would have been used as a tiebreaker if the head-to-head and overall records of teams were tied. It would also be used as a tiebreaker for the third-place ranking between groups if the overall records of teams were tied. The score was calculated based on yellow and red cards received by players and team officials in all group matches as follows:

- yellow card: −1 point;
- indirect red card (second yellow card): −3 points;
- direct red card: −4 points;
- yellow card and direct red card: −5 points;

Only one of the above deductions could be applied to a player or team official in a single match.

Team	Match 1				Match 2				Match 3				Score
Team	Yellow card	(yellow card) (yellow-red card)	Red card	(yellow card) (red card)	Yellow card	(yellow card) (yellow-red card)	Red card	(yellow card) (red card)	Yellow card	(yellow card) (yellow-red card)	Red card	(yellow card) (red card)	Score
France									1				–1
Norway									1				–1
Senegal									2				–2
Iraq	1				1				2		1		−8
