= List of FIFA World Cup own goals =

This is a list of all own goals scored during FIFA World Cup matches (not including qualification games). In 1997, FIFA published guidelines for classifying an own goal as "when a player plays the ball directly into his own net or when he redirects an opponent’s shot, cross or pass into his own goal", and excludes "shots that are on target (i.e. goal-bound) and touch a defender or rebound from the goal frame and bounce off a defender or goalkeeper".

Of the over 3,000 goals scored at the 23 final tournaments of the World Cup, only 68 have been own goals. Mexico and Morocco have each scored own goals on four occasions, while France has benefited on six occasions from opponents scoring own goals. Of the 67 (Note: One match had two own goals.) matches with an own goal, ten have ended as wins for the team scoring the own goal, and eleven have ended as draws. (Note: As per statistical convention in football, matches decided in extra time are counted as wins and losses, while matches decided by penalty shoot-outs are counted as draws.) All but 15 own goals have been scored in the first stages of the tournament.

The only player to score multiple own goals is Mohamed Hany of Egypt. He scored for both Belgium and Australia in 2026.

Following the 1994 murder of Colombian Andrés Escobar by a fan who was angry that Escobar's own goal had led to their country's early exit from that year's World Cup, own goals at the tournament have been subject to intense scrutiny, to stave off accusations of collusion. The 2018 World Cup, dubbed by The Washington Post as "among the cruelest in history" based on own goals mid-way through the group stages, ended up doubling the previous record for number of own goals at a single tournament, with twelve.

The 2026 tournament holds the record of most own goals, with 14.

== List ==
Key
Player's team won the match
Player's team drew the match (a penalty shoot-out is recorded as a draw regardless of shoot-out results)

Own goals scored at the FIFA World Cup tournaments
No.	Player	Time	Representing	Goal	Final score	Opponent	Tournament	Round	Date	FIFA report
1.	Manuel Rosas	51'	Mexico	0–2	0–3	Chile	1930, Uruguay	Group stage	July 16, 1930	
2.	Ernst Lörtscher	22'	Switzerland	0–2	4–2	Germany	1938, France	Round of 16 (replay)	June 9, 1938	
3.	Sven Jacobsson	19'	Sweden	1–1	1–5	Hungary	1938, France	Semi-finals	June 16, 1938	
4.	Jimmy Dickinson	94'	England	4–4	4–4^{aet}	Belgium	1954, Switzerland	Group stage	June 17, 1954	
5.	Raúl Cárdenas	46'	Mexico	0–2	2–3	France	1954, Switzerland	Group stage	June 19, 1954	
6.	Ivica Horvat	9'	Yugoslavia	0–1	0–2	West Germany	1954, Switzerland	Quarter-finals	June 27, 1954	
7.	Luis Cruz	59'	Uruguay	1–2	1–3	Austria	1954, Switzerland	Match for third place	July 3, 1954	
8.	Ivan Vutsov	17'	Bulgaria	0–1	0–3	Portugal	1966, England	Group stage	July 16, 1966	
9.	Ivan Davidov	43'	Bulgaria	1–1	1–3	Hungary	1966, England	Group stage	July 20, 1966	
10.	Javier Guzmán	25'	Mexico	1–1	1–4	Italy	1970, Mexico	Quarter-finals	June 14, 1970	
11.	Colin Curran	58'	Australia	0–1	0–2	East Germany	1974, West Germany	First group stage	June 14, 1974	
12.	Roberto Perfumo	35'	Argentina	1–1	1–1	Italy	1974, West Germany	First group stage	June 19, 1974	
13.	Ruud Krol	78'	Netherlands	3–1	4–1	Bulgaria	1974, West Germany	First group stage	June 23, 1974	
14.	Andranik Eskandarian	43'	Iran	0–1	1–1	Scotland	1978, Argentina	First group stage	June 7, 1978	
15.	Ernie Brandts	18'	Netherlands	0–1	2–1	Italy	1978, Argentina	Second group stage	June 21, 1978	
16.	Berti Vogts	59'	West Germany	1–1	2–3	Austria	1978, Argentina	Second group stage	June 21, 1978	
17.	Jozef Barmoš	66'	Czechoslovakia	0–2	0–2	England	1982, Spain	First group stage	June 20, 1982	
18.	László Dajka	73'	Hungary	0–5	0–6	Soviet Union	1986, Mexico	Group stage	June 2, 1986	
19.	Cho Kwang-rae	82'	South Korea	1–3	2–3	Italy	1986, Mexico	Group stage	June 10, 1986	
20.	Andrés Escobar	35'	Colombia	0–1	1–2	United States	1994, United States	Group stage	June 22, 1994	
21.	Tom Boyd	74'	Scotland	1–2	1–2	Brazil	1998, France	Group stage	June 10, 1998	
22.	Youssef Chippo	45+1'	Morocco	1–1	2–2	Norway	1998, France	Group stage	June 10, 1998	
23.	Pierre Issa	77'	South Africa	0–2	0–3	France	1998, France	Group stage	June 12, 1998	
24.	Andoni Zubizarreta	73'	Spain	2–2	2–3	Nigeria	1998, France	Group stage	June 13, 1998	
25.	Siniša Mihajlović	72'	Yugoslavia	2–1	2–2	Germany	1998, France	Group stage	June 21, 1998	
26.	Georgi Bachev	88'	Bulgaria	1–5	1–6	Spain	1998, France	Group stage	June 24, 1998	
27.	Jorge Costa	29'	Portugal	0–2	2–3	United States	2002, South Korea / Japan	Group stage	June 5, 2002	
28.	Jeff Agoos	71'	United States	3–2	3–2	Portugal	2002, South Korea / Japan	Group stage	June 5, 2002	
29.	Carles Puyol	10'	Spain	0–1	3–1	Paraguay	2002, South Korea / Japan	Group stage	June 7, 2002	
30.	Carlos Gamarra	3'	Paraguay	0–1	0–1	England	2006, Germany	Group stage	June 10, 2006	
31.	Cristian Zaccardo	27'	Italy	1–1	1–1	United States	2006, Germany	Group stage	June 17, 2006	
32.	Brent Sancho	25'	Trinidad and Tobago	0–1	0–2	Paraguay	2006, Germany	Group stage	June 20, 2006	
33.	Petit	60'	Portugal	0–2	1–3	Germany	2006, Germany	Match for third place	July 8, 2006	
34.	Daniel Agger	46'	Denmark	0–1	0–2	Netherlands	2010, South Africa	Group stage	June 14, 2010	
35.	Park Chu-young	17'	South Korea	0–1	1–4	Argentina	2010, South Africa	Group stage	June 17, 2010	
36.	Marcelo	11'	Brazil	0–1	3–1	Croatia	2014, Brazil	Group stage	June 12, 2014	
37.	Noel Valladares	48'	Honduras	0–2	0–3	France	2014, Brazil	Group stage	June 15, 2014	
38.	Sead Kolašinac	3'	Bosnia and Herzegovina	0–1	1–2	Argentina	2014, Brazil	Group stage	June 15, 2014	
39.	John Boye	31'	Ghana	0–1	1–2	Portugal	2014, Brazil	Group stage	June 26, 2014	
40.	Joseph Yobo	90+2'	Nigeria	0–2	0–2	France	2014, Brazil	Round of 16	June 30, 2014	
41.	Aziz Bouhaddouz	90+5'	Morocco	0–1	0–1	Iran	2018, Russia	Group stage	June 15, 2018	
42.	Aziz Behich	81'	Australia	1–2	1–2	France	2018, Russia	Group stage	June 16, 2018	
43.	Oghenekaro Etebo	32'	Nigeria	0–1	0–2	Croatia	2018, Russia	Group stage	June 16, 2018	
44.	Thiago Cionek	37'	Poland	0–1	1–2	Senegal	2018, Russia	Group stage	June 19, 2018	
45.	Ahmed Fathy	47'	Egypt	0–1	1–3	Russia	2018, Russia	Group stage	June 19, 2018	
46.	Denis Cheryshev	23'	Russia	0–2	0–3	Uruguay	2018, Russia	Group stage	June 25, 2018	
47.	Edson Álvarez	74'	Mexico	0–3	0–3	Sweden	2018, Russia	Group stage	June 27, 2018	
48.	Yann Sommer	90+3'	Switzerland	2–2	2–2	Costa Rica	2018, Russia	Group stage	June 27, 2018	
49.	Yassine Meriah	33'	Tunisia	0–1	2–1	Panama	2018, Russia	Group stage	June 28, 2018	
50.	Sergei Ignashevich	12'	Russia	0–1	1–1^{aet} (Note: Russia won 4–3 on penalty kicks.)	Spain	2018, Russia	Round of 16	July 1, 2018	
51.	Fernandinho	13'	Brazil	0–1	1–2	Belgium	2018, Russia	Quarter-finals	July 6, 2018	
52.	Mario Mandžukić	18'	Croatia	0–1	2–4	France	2018, Russia	Final	July 15, 2018	
53.	Nayef Aguerd	40'	Morocco	2–1	2–1	Canada	2022, Qatar	Group stage	December 1, 2022	
54.	Enzo Fernández	77'	Argentina	2–1	2–1	Australia	2022, Qatar	Round of 16	December 3, 2022	
55.	Damián Bobadilla	7'	Paraguay	0–1	1–4	United States	2026, Canada / Mexico / United States	Group stage	June 12, 2026	
56.	Miro Muheim	90+4'	Switzerland	1–1	1–1	Qatar	2026, Canada / Mexico / United States	Group stage	June 13, 2026	
57.	Mohamed Hany	66'	Egypt	1–1	1–1	Belgium	2026, Canada / Mexico / United States	Group stage	June 15, 2026	
58.	Aymen Hussein	90+6'	Iraq	1–4	1–4	Norway	2026, Canada / Mexico / United States	Group stage	June 16, 2026	
59.	Yazan Al-Arab	76'	Jordan	1–2	1–3	Austria	2026, Canada / Mexico / United States	Group stage	June 16, 2026	
60.	Mohamed Manai	75'	Qatar	0–5	0–6	Canada	2026, Canada / Mexico / United States	Group stage	June 18, 2026	
61.	Cameron Burgess	11'	Australia	0–1	0–2	United States	2026, Canada / Mexico / United States	Group stage	June 19, 2026	
62.	Hassan Al-Tambakti	49'	Saudi Arabia	0–4	0–4	Spain	2026, Canada / Mexico / United States	Group stage	June 21, 2026	
63.	Abduvohid Nematov	60'	Uzbekistan	0–4	0–5	Portugal	2026, Canada / Mexico / United States	Group stage	June 23, 2026	
64.	Mahmud Abunada	34'	Qatar	0–2	1–3	Bosnia and Herzegovina	2026, Canada / Mexico / United States	Group stage	June 24, 2026	
65.	Yassine Bounou	10'	Morocco	0–1	4–2	Haiti	2026, Canada / Mexico / United States	Group stage	June 24, 2026	
66.	Ellyes Skhiri	3'	Tunisia	0–1	1–3	Netherlands	2026, Canada / Mexico / United States	Group stage	June 25, 2026	
67.	Mohamed Hany	55'	Egypt	1–1	1–1^{aet} (Note: Egypt won 4–2 on penalty kicks.)	Australia	2026, Canada / Mexico / United States	Round of 32	July 3, 2026	
68.	Diney	111'	Cape Verde	2–3	2–3^{aet}	Argentina	2026, Canada / Mexico / United States	Round of 32	July 3, 2026	

== Statistics and notable own goals ==
=== Tournament ===
- Most own goals, tournament: 14 – 2026
- Tournaments without own goals: 1934, 1950, 1958, 1962, 1990
- To date the only own goal to open scoring in a tournament: Marcelo, against Brazil v Croatia, 2014 (Note: In addition, another own goal has been scored in a tournament's opening match: Tom Boyd, Scotland vs Brazil, 1998.)
- To date the only own goal in a final match: Mario Mandžukić, against Croatia v France, 2018
- To date the only match with two own goals (and the only match where both teams scored an own goal against each other): United States vs Portugal, 2002. Jorge Costa of Portugal scored for the United States, and Jeff Agoos of the United States scored for Portugal.

=== Teams ===
- Most own goals by a team: 4
  - Mexico (1930, 1954, 1970, 2018)
  - Morocco (1998, 2018, 2022, 2026)
- Most own goals in favour of a team: 6 – France (1954, 1998, 2014 (x2), 2018 (x2))
- Most own goals by a team in one tournament: 2
  - Bulgaria, 1966
  - Russia, 2018
  - Qatar, 2026
  - Egypt, 2026
- Most own goals in favour of a team in one tournament: 2
  - France, 2014 and 2018
  - United States, 2026
- Most matches, never scoring an own goal: 81 – France (1930–2026)
- Most matches, never benefiting from an own goal: 65 – Mexico (1930–2026)
- Most matches, never scoring or benefiting from an own goal: 29 – Japan (1998–2026)
- To date the only team to have scored multiple own goals for the same opponent: SFR Yugoslavia / FR Yugoslavia (Note: Now succeeded by Serbia.) scored two own goals for West Germany / Germany (1954, 1998)
- To date the only pair of teams to have scored own goals for each other: Portugal and United States, in the same match in 2002
- To date the only team where every match of a tournament featuring them had an own goal: Qatar in 2026 (Switzerland scored an own goal against Qatar before Qatar scored an own goal against both Canada and Bosnia and Herzegovina).

=== Players ===
- Most own goals by a player: 2 – Mohamed Hany, against Egypt, for Belgium and for Australia in 2026
- Youngest player with an own goal: 18 years, 90 days – Manuel Rosas, against Mexico v Chile, 1930
- Oldest player with an own goal: 38 years, 352 days – Sergei Ignashevich, against Russia v Spain, 2018
- Players who have scored own goals and regular goals:
  - Manuel Rosas of Mexico scored twice against Argentina in 1930
  - Ruud Krol of the Netherlands scored against Argentina in 1974
  - Ernie Brandts of the Netherlands scored against Austria and Italy in 1978
  - Siniša Mihajlović of Yugoslavia scored against Iran in 1998
  - Park Chu-young of South Korea scored against Nigeria in 2010
  - Carles Puyol of Spain scored against Germany in 2010
  - Fernandinho of Brazil scored against Cameroon in 2014
  - Denis Cheryshev of Russia scored twice against Saudi Arabia and once against Egypt and Croatia in 2018
  - Mario Mandžukić of Croatia scored twice against Cameroon in 2014, and once against Denmark, England and France in 2018
  - Enzo Fernández of Argentina scored against Mexico in 2022, and against Egypt and England in 2026
  - Aymen Hussein of Iraq scored against Norway in 2026
- Players to score for both teams in a match:
  - Ernie Brandts, Netherlands vs Italy, 1978
  - Mario Mandžukić, Croatia vs France, 2018
  - Aymen Hussein, Iraq vs Norway, 2026

=== Time ===
- First ever own goal: Manuel Rosas, against Mexico v Chile, 1930
- Fastest own goal: 2:10 minute – Sead Kolašinac, against Bosnia and Herzegovina v Argentina, 2014
- Latest regulation-time own goal: 90+6th minute – Aymen Hussein, against Iraq v Norway, 2026
- Own goals during extra time:
  - Jimmy Dickinson, 94th minute, against England v Belgium, 1954
  - Diney, 111th minute, against Cape Verde v Argentina, 2026

=== Various ===
- The own goal that Honduran goalkeeper Noel Valladares scored for France in 2014 was the first World Cup goal (of any kind) to be awarded with goal-line technology.
- Trinidad and Tobago has scored more own goals (one) than regular goals (zero).
- It is believed that the murder of Colombian footballer Andrés Escobar in the immediate aftermath of the 1994 World Cup was a retaliation for him having scored an own goal which contributed to his team's elimination from the tournament.

== By team ==
Own goals by nations
Team	Own goals by	
Team	own players	opponents
Mexico	4	0
Morocco	4	0
Egypt	3	0
Switzerland	3	0
Bulgaria	3	1
Australia	3	2
Serbia	2	0
South Korea	2	0
Tunisia	2	0
Brazil	2	1
Nigeria	2	1
Qatar	2	1
Netherlands	2	2
Paraguay	2	2
Russia	2	2
Argentina	2	3
Spain	2	3
Portugal	2	4
Cape Verde	1	0
Colombia	1	0
Czechoslovakia	1	0
Denmark	1	0
Ghana	1	0
Honduras	1	0
Iraq	1	0
Jordan	1	0
Poland	1	0
Saudi Arabia	1	0
South Africa	1	0
Trinidad and Tobago	1	0
Uzbekistan	1	0
Bosnia and Herzegovina	1	1
Iran	1	1
Scotland	1	1
Sweden	1	1
Uruguay	1	1
Croatia	1	2
England	1	2
Hungary	1	2
Germany	1	4
Italy	1	4
United States	1	5
Chile	0	1
Costa Rica	0	1
East Germany	0	1
Haiti	0	1
Panama	0	1
Senegal	0	1
Canada	0	2
Norway	0	2
Austria	0	3
Belgium	0	3
France	0	6

== By tournament ==
Key
†	Denotes the highest own goalscoring-related record

Own goals by tournament
Year	Teams	Matches	Goals	Own goals	Own goals per match	Percentage of goals
1930	13	18	70	1	0.06	1.43%
1934	16	17	70	0	–	–
1938	15	18	84	2	0.11	2.38%
1950	13	22	88	0	–	–
1954	16	26	140	4	0.15	2.86%
1958	16	35	126	0	–	–
1962	16	32	89	0	–	–
1966	16	32	89	2	0.06	2.25%
1970	16	32	95	1	0.03	1.05%
1974	16	38	97	3	0.08	3.09%
1978	16	38	102	3	0.08	2.94%
1982	24	52	146	1	0.02	0.68%
1986	24	52	132	2	0.04	1.52%
1990	24	52	115	0	–	–
1994	24	52	141	1	0.02	0.71%
1998	32	64	171	6	0.09	3.51%
2002	32	64	161	3	0.05	1.86%
2006	32	64	147	4	0.06	2.72%
2010	32	64	145	2	0.03	1.38%
2014	32	64	171	5	0.08	2.92%
2018	32	64	169	12	0.19^{†}	7.1%^{†}
2022	32	64	172	2	0.03	1.16%
2026	48	104	308	14^{†}	0.13	4.55%
Total		1,068	3,028	68	0.06	2.25%

== See also ==
- List of UEFA European Championship own goals
- List of FIFA Women's World Cup own goals
- FIFA World Cup records and statistics
