= 2024–25 Al-Wehda Club season =

Al-Wehda
2024–25 season
- President: Sultan Azhar
- Manager: Josef Zinnbauer (until 15 November); José Daniel Carreño (from 27 November)
- Stadium: King Abdul Aziz Stadium
- Pro League: 16th (relegated)
- King Cup: Round of 16 (knocked out by Al-Qadsiah)
- Top goalscorer: League: Abdulaziz Noor (7 goals); All: Abdulaziz Noor; Odion Ighalo (7 goals each)
- Highest home attendance: 16,275 v Al-Ittihad; 15 February 2025; Saudi Pro League
- Lowest home attendance: 247 v Al-Raed; 6 March 2025; Saudi Pro League
- Average home league attendance: 3,316

The 2024–25 season was Al-Wehda's 40th non-consecutive season in the top flight of Saudi football and 79th year in existence as a football club. The club participated in the Pro League, and the King Cup.

The season covers the period from 1 July 2024 to 30 June 2025.

== Players ==
=== Squad information ===
As of 1 February 2025

Note: Flags indicate national team as defined under FIFA eligibility rules; some limited exceptions apply. Players may hold more than one non-FIFA nationality.

No.	Pos.	Nation	Player
1	GK	KSA	Abdullah Al-Owaishir (on loan from Al-Ettifaq)
2	DF	KSA	Saeed Al-Muwallad
4	MF	KSA	Waleed Bakshween (captain)
5	DF	MAR	Jawad El Yamiq
6	MF	ROU	Alexandru Crețu
8	MF	KSA	Alaa Al Hejji
9	FW	NGR	Odion Ighalo
10	MF	CUW	Juninho Bacuna
11	FW	IRQ	Youssef Amyn
13	DF	KSA	Meshal Al-Alaeli (on loan from Al-Ettifaq)
14	DF	KSA	Bandar Darwish
16	MF	KSA	Nawaf Al-Azizi
17	DF	KSA	Abdullah Al-Hafith
18	MF	TUN	Saad Bguir

No.	Pos.	Nation	Player
19	DF	KSA	Saad Al-Qahtani
22	DF	KSA	Ali Makki
23	FW	AUS	Craig Goodwin
24	MF	SDN	Abdulaziz Noor
28	MF	KSA	Hussain Al-Eisa
35	MF	MAR	Mohamed Al Makahasi
44	DF	KSA	Redha Ambadu
47	GK	KSA	Ahmed Al-Rashidi
49	DF	KSA	Ali Al-Salem
55	DF	KSA	Mohammed Al-Sufyani
60	GK	KSA	Sultan Al-Harbi
71	GK	KSA	Abdullah Fallatah
77	FW	KSA	Mourad Khodari
80	FW	KSA	Yahya Al-Najei

=== Out on loan ===
Note: Flags indicate national team as defined under FIFA eligibility rules; some limited exceptions apply. Players may hold more than one non-FIFA nationality.

No.	Pos.	Nation	Player
21	GK	KSA	Abdulrahman Al-Shammari (at Al-Faisaly until 30 June 2025)
25	MF	KSA	Sattam Al-Tambakti (at Jeddah until 30 June 2025)

No.	Pos.	Nation	Player
29	MF	KSA	Sultan Al-Akouz (at Al-Najmah until 30 June 2025)
33	DF	KSA	Rakan Al-Harbi (at Al-Bukiryah until 30 June 2025)

== Transfers and loans ==
=== Transfers in ===
Entry date	Position	No.	Player	From club	Fee	Ref.
30 June 2024	DF	33	(Saudi Arabia) Rakan Al-Harbi	(Saudi Arabia) Najran	End of loan	
30 June 2024	DF	50	(Saudi Arabia) Saad Al-Khayri	(Saudi Arabia) Al-Safa	End of loan	
30 June 2024	MF	25	(Saudi Arabia) Sattam Tambakti	(Saudi Arabia) Al-Ain	End of loan	
30 June 2024	MF	55	(Saudi Arabia) Nawaf Hawsawi	(Saudi Arabia) Jeddah	End of loan	
30 June 2024	MF	60	(Saudi Arabia) Mohammed Al-Shalwi	(Saudi Arabia) Al-Entesar	End of loan	
30 June 2024	FW	99	(Saudi Arabia) Sultan Hawsawi	(Saudi Arabia) Al-Qaisumah	End of loan	
23 August 2024	DF	49	(Saudi Arabia) Ali Al-Salem	(Saudi Arabia) Al-Adalah	Free	
23 August 2024	FW	77	(Saudi Arabia) Mourad Khodari	(Saudi Arabia) Al-Ahli	Free	
24 August 2024	GK	21	(Saudi Arabia) Abdulrahman Al-Shammari	(Saudi Arabia) Al-Arabi	Free	
28 August 2024	GK	12	(Uruguay) Ignacio de Arruabarrena	(Portugal) Arouca	Free	
28 August 2024	DF	14	(Saudi Arabia) Bandar Darwish	(Saudi Arabia) Al-Orobah	Free	
28 August 2024	MF	6	(Romania) Alexandru Crețu	(Romania) Universitatea Craiova	Free	
28 August 2024	MF	10	(Curaçao) Juninho Bacuna	(England) Birmingham City	Undisclosed	
28 August 2024	MF	35	(Morocco) Mohamed Al Makahasi	(Morocco) Raja	Free	
28 August 2024	FW	11	(Iraq) Youssef Amyn	(Germany) Eintracht Braunschweig	$390,000	
2 September 2024	DF	19	(Saudi Arabia) Saad Al-Qahtani	(Saudi Arabia) Al-Shabab	Free	
3 September 2024	MF	18	(Tunisia) Saad Bguir	(Saudi Arabia) Abha	Free	

=== Loans in ===
Start date	End date	Position	No.	Player	From club	Fee	Ref.
3 September 2024	End of season	GK	1	(Saudi Arabia) Abdullah Al-Owaishir	(Saudi Arabia) Al-Ettifaq	None	
3 September 2024	End of season	DF	13	(Saudi Arabia) Meshal Al-Alaeli	(Saudi Arabia) Al-Ettifaq	None	

=== Transfers out ===
Exit date	Position	No.	Player	To club	Fee	Ref.
2 July 2024	GK	1	(Morocco) Munir Mohamedi	(Morocco) RS Berkane	Free	
18 July 2024	DF	27	(Saudi Arabia) Islam Hawsawi	(Saudi Arabia) Neom	Undisclosed	
18 July 2024	MF	55	(Saudi Arabia) Nawaf Hawsawi	(Saudi Arabia) Al-Riyadh	Free	
24 July 2024	GK	21	(Saudi Arabia) Ayman Al-Hussaini	(Saudi Arabia) Al-Arabi	Free	
31 July 2024	GK	13	(Saudi Arabia) Abdulquddus Atiah	(Saudi Arabia) Al-Taawoun	Free	
1 August 2024	FW	99	(Saudi Arabia) Sultan Hawsawi	(Saudi Arabia) Jeddah	Free	
3 August 2024	DF	54	(Saudi Arabia) Ghassan Hawsawi	(Saudi Arabia) Al-Okhdood	Free	
20 August 2024	MF	12	(Saudi Arabia) Abdulkareem Al-Qahtani	(Saudi Arabia) Al-Batin	Free	
20 August 2024	MF	76	(Morocco) Fayçal Fajr	(Saudi Arabia) Al-Taawoun	Free	
22 August 2024	DF	3	(Saudi Arabia) Abdulelah Bukhari	(Saudi Arabia) Al-Jabalain	Free	
23 August 2024	MF	90	(Saudi Arabia) Hazzaa Al-Ghamdi	(Saudi Arabia) Damac	Free	
26 August 2024	MF	8	(Saudi Arabia) Mohammed Al-Qarni	(Saudi Arabia) Al-Orobah	Free	
27 August 2024	DF	6	(Costa Rica) Óscar Duarte	(Costa Rica) Deportivo Saprissa	Free	
2 September 2024	DF	18	(Saudi Arabia) Abdulrahman Al-Hajeri	(Saudi Arabia) Al-Riyadh	Free	
3 September 2024	FW	–	(Saudi Arabia) Thamer Al-Ali	(Saudi Arabia) Damac	Free	
31 January 2025	FW	15	(Saudi Arabia) Azzam Al-Bishi	(Saudi Arabia) Al-Bukiryah	Free	

=== Loans out ===
Start date	End date	Position	No.	Player	To club	Fee	Ref.
16 July 2024	End of season	DF	33	(Saudi Arabia) Rakan Al-Harbi	(Saudi Arabia) Al-Bukiryah	None	
25 July 2024	End of season	MF	25	(Saudi Arabia) Sattam Tambakti	(Saudi Arabia) Jeddah	None	
28 January 2025	End of season	MF	29	(Saudi Arabia) Sultan Al-Akouz	(Saudi Arabia) Al-Najma	None	
31 January 2025	End of season	GK	21	(Saudi Arabia) Abdulrahman Al-Shammari	(Saudi Arabia) Al-Faisaly	None	

== Pre-season and friendlies ==
25 July 2024 Friendly	Al-Wehda (Saudi Arabia)	4–0	(Spain) Costa City	Alicante, Spain
17:30 CEST	Al-Hafith; Ighalo; Al Hejji (o.g.)	Report		Stadium: Club De Golf Bonalba

28 July 2024 Friendly	Al-Wehda (Saudi Arabia)	0–0	Qatar SC	Alicante, Spain
17:30 CEST		Report		Stadium: Club De Golf Bonalba

3 August 2024 Friendly	Al-Wehda (Saudi Arabia)	0–0	(Spain) La Unión Atlético	Alicante, Spain
17:30 CEST				Stadium: Club De Golf Bonalba

8 August 2024 Friendly	Al-Wehda (Saudi Arabia)	1–1	(Spain) Granada	Granada, Spain
21:30 CEST	Uzuni 6'	Report	Ighalo 22'	Stadium: Nuevo Estadio de Los Cármenes

16 August 2024 Friendly	Al-Wehda (Saudi Arabia)	3–3	(Saudi Arabia) Al-Ahli	Jeddah, Saudi Arabia
19:35 AST	Goodwin,,	Report	Veiga; Al-Rashidi,	Stadium: Prince Mohammed bin Abdullah Al Faisal Stadium

== Competitions ==
=== Overview ===
Competition	Record							
Competition	Pld	W	D	L	GF	GA	GD	Win %
Pro League	34	9	6	19	42	67	−25	26.47
King Cup	2	0	1	1	2	3	−1	0.00
Total	36	9	7	20	44	70	−26	25.00

Updated to match played 26 May 2025
Source: Competitions

=== Pro League ===
==== League table ====
Pos	Team	Pld	W	D	L	GF	GA	GD	Pts	Qualification or relegation
14	Damac	34	9	8	17	37	50	−13	35	
15	Al-Okhdood	34	9	7	18	33	56	−23	34	
16	Al-Wehda (R)	34	9	6	19	42	67	−25	33	Relegation to First Division League
17	Al-Orobah (R)	34	9	3	22	31	74	−43	30	Relegation to First Division League
18	Al-Raed (R)	34	6	3	25	41	66	−25	21	Relegation to First Division League

Source: SPL
Rules for classification: 1) Points; 2) Head-to-head points; 3) Head-to-head goal difference; 4) Total goal difference; 5) Total goals scored; 6) Fair-play points
(Note: Head-to-head record is used only after all the matches between the teams in question have been played).
(R) Relegated

==== Results summary ====
Overall								Home						Away					
Pld	W	D	L	GF	GA	GD	Pts	W	D	L	GF	GA	GD	W	D	L	GF	GA	GD
34	9	6	19	42	67	−25	33	4	4	9	24	35	−11	5	2	10	18	32	−14

Last updated: 26 May 2025.
Source: Saudi Pro League

==== Results by round ====
Round	1	2	3	4	5	6	7	8	9	10	11	12	13	14	15	16	17	18	19	20	21	22	23	24	25	26	27	28	29	30	31	32	33	34
Ground	H	H	A	H	A	H	A	H	A	H	H	A	H	A	H	A	H	A	A	H	A	H	A	H	A	H	A	A	H	A	H	A	H	A
Result	D	W	L	L	L	D	D	L	L	L	W	L	L	W	L	L	D	L	L	L	L	L	D	W	W	L	W	W	L	W	W	L	D	L
Position	9	7	11	14	16	15	14	15	17	17	15	16	16	16	17	17	17	17	17	17	18	18	18	18	17	17	17	15	17	16	15	15	15	16

Updated to match(es) played on 26 May 2025. Source: Saudi Pro League
A = Away; H = Home; W = Win; D = Draw; L = Loss

==== Matches ====
All times are local, AST (UTC+3).

Win Draw Loss Postponed

22 August 2024 1	Al-Wehda	3–3	Al-Riyadh	Mecca
21:00	Goodwin 40', 62'; Al-Hafith (yellow card) 83'; Khodari 90+4'; Noor (yellow card) 90+13'	Report	Mensah 51'; Al-Nowaiqi (red card) 59'; Tozé (yellow card) 71'; Al-Aqel (yellow card) 79'; Bayesh 85'; Kal 90+7'	Stadium: King Abdulaziz Sports City; Attendance: 670; Referee: Mohammed Al-Esmaiel

28 August 2024 2	Al-Wehda	2–1	Al-Orobah	Mecca
21:00	Ighalo 1'; Al-Najei (yellow card) 37'; Bacuna (yellow card) 83'; Khodari 90+3', (yellow card) 90+5'	Report	Al-Hunaiti 33'	Stadium: King Abdulaziz Sports City; Attendance: 780; Referee: Mamdouh Al Shahdan

15 September 2024 3	Al-Ittihad	7–1	Al-Wehda	Jeddah
21:00	Benzema 2', 46', 89'; Aouar 13'; Kanté (yellow card) 30'; Fabinho 45+4'; Al-Sqoor 55'; Al-Shehri 87'	Report	Crețu (yellow card) 27'; Amyn 31'	Stadium: King Abdullah Sports City; Attendance: 49,712; Referee: Sami Al-Jires

19 September 2024 4	Al-Wehda	0–1	Al-Kholood	Mecca
21:00	Darwish (yellow card) 45' (yellow-red card) 57'; Al Makahasi (yellow card) 66'; Al-Shammari (yellow card) 90'; Al-Muwallad (yellow card) 90+3'	Report	Collado 60'; Muleka (yellow card) 81'; Al-Hammami (yellow card) 90+3'	Stadium: King Abdulaziz Sports City; Attendance: 897; Referee: Fareeh Al-Jaloud

27 September 2024 5	Al-Nassr	2–0	Al-Wehda	Riyadh
18:20	Ângelo 41'; Otávio (yellow card) 45+4'; Ronaldo 56' (pen.); Bento (yellow card) 74'; Al-Hassan (yellow card) 90+4'	Report	Bakshween (yellow card) 23' (yellow-red card) 86'	Stadium: Al-Awwal Park; Attendance: 14,758; Referee: Bastian Dankert (Germany)

3 October 2024 6	Al-Wehda	2–2	Al-Fayha	Mecca
21:00	Al-Alaeli 4'; Al-Hejji (yellow card) 55'; Ighalo 82'; Crețu (yellow card) 90+14'; Al-Salem (yellow card) 90+16'	Report	Sakala (yellow card) 50', (goal) 90+14'; Pozuelo 74'; Al-Beshe (yellow card) 85'; Al-Duqayl (yellow card) 90+3'	Stadium: King Abdulaziz Sports City; Attendance: 465; Referee: Mohammed Al-Daqqash

19 October 2024 7	Al-Raed	2–2	Al-Wehda	Buraidah
18:05	Al-Khaibari (yellow card) 41'; Sayoud 53'; Al-Sahli 65'; Abeid (yellow card) 90+4'	Report	Amyn (yellow card) 37'; Noor 47', (yellow card) 69'; Khodari 90+5'	Stadium: Al-Raed Club Stadium; Attendance: 1,284; Referee: Shukri Al-Hanfoush

24 October 2024 8	Al-Wehda	1–3	Al-Khaleej	Mecca
21:00	Amyn 45+1'; Al-Hejji (yellow card) 89'; Crețu (yellow card) 90+6'	Report	Fortounis 55' (pen.); Martins 59'; Narey 72'	Stadium: King Abdulaziz Sports City; Attendance: 1,067; Referee: Sultan Okairy

31 October 2024 9	Al-Shabab	3–1	Al-Wehda	Riyadh
17:50	Guanca 35'; Al-Sibyani (yellow card) 38'; Hamdallah 52'; Al-Juwayr 61'; Kanabah (yellow card) 78'; Abdullah (yellow card) 81'; Al-Shanqiti (red card) 90+11'	Report	Bacuna 90+1' (pen.)	Stadium: Al-Shabab Club Stadium; Attendance: 2,661; Referee: Majed Al-Shamrani

9 November 2024 10	Al-Wehda	2–3	Damac	Mecca
18:15	Al-Hejji (yellow card) 5'; Al-Alaeli (yellow card) 20'; Bacuna (yellow card) 49'; Darwish 55'; Noor 88'	Report	Kamano 1', 51'; Al-Sibyani (yellow card) 68'; Nkoudou 83'; Niță (yellow card) 90+8'	Stadium: King Abdulaziz Sports City; Attendance: 518; Referee: Mohammed Al-Hoaish

23 November 2024 11	Al-Wehda	1–0	Al-Taawoun	Mecca
18:15	Bacuna (yellow card) 21'; Noor 41'	Report	Al-Jumayah (yellow card) 53'	Stadium: King Abdulaziz Sports City; Attendance: 444; Referee: Mohammed Abu Shaqarah

29 November 2024 12	Al-Ahli	1–0	Al-Wehda	Jeddah
20:00	Majrashi (yellow card) 42'; Mahrez 55'; Kessié (yellow card) 90+9'	Report	Bacuna (yellow card) 57'	Stadium: Prince Abdullah Al-Faisal Sports City; Attendance: 11,565; Referee: Esteban Ostojich (Uruguay)

5 December 2024 13	Al-Wehda	2–3	Al-Okhdood	Mecca
18:15	Ighalo 5'; Al-Alaeli (yellow card) 45+6'; Goodwin 58'; Crețu (yellow card) 90+4'	Report	Bassogog 32'; Koné 36', (yellow card) 61'; El Yamiq 40' (o.g.); Al-Rubaie (yellow card) 53'	Stadium: King Abdulaziz Sports City; Attendance: 405; Referee: Sami Al-Jires

9 January 2025 14	Al-Fateh	1–2	Al-Wehda	Al-Hasa
17:45	Masoud (yellow card) 38'; Batna (yellow card) 55'; Bendebka 57'; Djaniny (yellow card) 87'	Report	El Yamiq (yellow card) 8'; Goodwin 14'; Ighalo 26'; Al-Hejji (yellow card) 90+4'	Stadium: Al-Fateh Club Stadium; Attendance: 4,182; Referee: Majed Al-Shamrani

17 January 2025 15	Al-Wehda	0–3	Al-Qadsiah	Mecca
18:40	Ighalo (yellow card) 30'; Al-Owaishir (yellow card) 66'	Report	Thakri (yellow card) 37'; Puertas 44'; Aubameyang 67'; Lajami (yellow card) 90+4'; Fernández 90+7'	Stadium: King Abdulaziz Sports City; Attendance: 1,126; Referee: Tamás Bognár (Hungary)

21 January 2025 16	Al-Hilal	4–1	Al-Wehda	Riyadh
20:00	Leonardo 7'; Malcom 11', 82'; Lodi (yellow card) 87'; Al-Hamdan 90+1'	Report	Al-Hejji (yellow card) 76'; Goodwin 89'	Stadium: Kingdom Arena; Attendance: 20,044; Referee: Leandro Rey Hilfer (Argentina)

25 January 2025 17	Al-Wehda	2–2	Al-Ettifaq	Mecca
20:00	Al Makahasi (yellow card) 5'; Al-Salem 31'; Amyn (yellow card) 67', (goal) 85' m	Report	Dembélé 79'; Madu 90+3'	Stadium: King Abdulaziz Sports City; Attendance: 700; Referee: Khaled Al-Ahmari

30 January 2025 18	Al-Riyadh	1–0	Al-Wehda	Riyadh
18:15	Tozé (yellow card) 45+1'; Al-Owaishir 65' (o.g.); Konaté (yellow card) 76'; Tambakti (yellow card) 81'; Al-Abed (yellow card) 84'	Report		Stadium: Prince Faisal bin Fahd Sports City Stadium; Attendance: 137; Referee: Shukri Al-Hanfoush

7 February 2025 19	Al-Orobah	4–2	Al-Wehda	Sakakah
16:05	Young 3'; Al Somah 44' (pen.), 51'; Al-Rashidi (yellow card) 53'; I. Al-Zubaidi (yellow card) 55'; Tello 90+7'	Report	Bguir 8', 61'; Al-Najei (yellow card) 90+5'; Crețu (yellow card) 90+9'	Stadium: Al Jouf University Stadium; Attendance: 1,363; Referee: Mohammed Al-Hoaish

15 February 2025 20	Al-Wehda	1–4	Al-Ittihad	Mecca
20:00	El Yamiq 42'; Al Makahasi (yellow card) 72'	Report	Al-Shanqeeti 35'; Benzema 45'; Bergwijn 60'; Aouar 90+5'	Stadium: King Abdulaziz Sports City; Attendance: 16,275; Referee: Sebastián Zunino (Argentina)

22 February 2025 21	Al-Kholood	1–0	Al-Wehda	Ar Rass
16:00	Al-Safri (yellow card) 6'; Maolida 20'	Report	Al-Eisa (yellow card) 45+5'	Stadium: Al-Hazem Club Stadium; Attendance: 2,468; Referee: Khalid Al-Turais

25 February 2025 22	Al-Wehda	0–2	Al-Nassr	Mecca
20:00	Al-Alaeli (yellow card) 68'; Al-Eisa (yellow card) 86'; El Yamiq (yellow card) 90+6'	Report	Ronaldo 48'; Al-Najdi (yellow card) 70'; Mané 90+10' (pen.)	Stadium: King Abdulaziz Sports City; Attendance: 14,679; Referee: Harm Osmers (Germany)

1 March 2025 23	Al-Fayha	0–0	Al-Wehda	Al Majma'ah
22:00		Report	Goodwin (yellow card) 60'; Al-Najei (yellow card) 83'	Stadium: Al Majma'ah Sports City; Attendance: 575; Referee: Abdullah Al-Shehri

6 March 2025 24	Al-Wehda	3–1	Al-Raed	Mecca
22:00	Bguir 24'; Al-Alaeli (yellow card) 32'; Al-Hejji (yellow card) 48'; Ighalo 76'; Amyn (yellow card) 78'; Al Makahasi (yellow card) 82'; Crețu 90'	Report	El Berkaoui 16'; Al-Dossari (yellow card) 71'; Qasmi (yellow card) 86'	Stadium: King Abdulaziz Sports City; Attendance: 247; Referee: Faisal Al-Blwi

14 March 2025 25	Al-Khaleej	0–2	Al-Wehda	Dammam
22:00	Al-Khabrani (yellow card) 61'	Report	Bacuna 2', (yellow card) 74'; Bakshween (yellow card) 33'; Al-Salem (yellow card) 48'; Amyn 63'; Al-Hejji (yellow card) 83'	Stadium: Prince Mohamed bin Fahd Stadium; Attendance: 2,311; Referee: Mohammed Al-Harbi

6 April 2025 26	Al-Wehda	1–3	Al-Shabab	Mecca
21:00	Noor (yellow card) 45+1'; Bacuna (yellow card) 48'; Goodwin 61'	Report	Renan (yellow card) 12'; Hamdallah 20'; Al-Shuwayrikh 69'; Camara 71'	Stadium: King Abdulaziz Sports City; Attendance: 892; Referee: Mohammed Al-Hoaish

10 April 2025 27	Damac	0–1	Al-Wehda	Khamis Mushait
19:00	Bedrane (yellow card) 9' (yellow-red card) 35'; Al-Obaid (yellow card) 40'	Report	El Yamiq (yellow card) 43'; Bacuna 52'; Bakshween (yellow card) 90+8'	Stadium: Damac Club Stadium; Attendance: 1,079; Referee: Sultan Al-Harbi

19 April 2025 28	Al-Taawoun	0–2	Al-Wehda	Buraidah
21:00	Al-Mufarrij (yellow card) 20'	Report	Makki (yellow card) 4'; Bguir (yellow card) 11'; Noor 20'; Al-Najei 66'; Al-Salem (yellow card) 90+4'	Stadium: Al-Taawoun Club Stadium; Attendance: 1,518; Referee: Khalid Al-Turais

22 April 2025 29	Al-Wehda	2–3	Al-Ahli	Mecca
19:20	Al-Hejji (yellow card) 31', (goal) 90+6'; Bacuna (yellow card) 66'; Al-Hafith 81'	Report	Ibañez 6'; Galeno 58'; Mahrez 89'	Stadium: King Abdulaziz Sports City; Attendance: 7,457; Referee: João Pinheiro (Portugal)

1 May 2025 30	Al-Okhdood	1–2	Al-Wehda	Najran
19:00	Barry 50'	Report	Makki (yellow card) 44'; Al Makahasi 55'; Noor 75'	Stadium: Prince Hathloul bin Abdulaziz Sports City; Attendance: 1,498; Referee: Sven Jablonski (Germany)

10 May 2025 31	Al-Wehda	1–0	Al-Fateh	Jeddah
19:25	Noor 8'; Ighalo (yellow card) 23'; Al-Hejji (yellow card) 64'; Bakshween (yellow card) 81'	Report	Al-Zarie (yellow card) 5'; Youssouf (yellow card) 57'	Stadium: Prince Abdullah Al-Faisal Sports City; Attendance: 261; Referee: Majed Al-Shamrani

15 May 2025 32	Al-Qadsiah	3–1	Al-Wehda	Dammam
18:55	Puertas 43', 86'; Thakri (yellow card) 48'; Casteels (yellow card) 90+3'; Aubameyang 90+7'	Report	Al-Salem (yellow card) 18'; Ighalo 29'; Al Makahasi (yellow card) 81'	Stadium: Prince Mohamed bin Fahd Stadium; Attendance: 9,919; Referee: Georgi Kabakov (Bulgaria)

21 May 2025 33	Al-Wehda	1–1	Al-Hilal	Jeddah
21:00	Al-Hejji (yellow card) 22'; Al-Alaeli (yellow card) 45+1'; Noor 51'; Al Makahasi (yellow card) 89'; Al-Rashidi (yellow card) 90+1'	Report	S. Al-Dawsari (yellow card) 42'; Neves (yellow card) 83'; Milinković-Savić 90+2'	Stadium: Prince Abdullah Al-Faisal Sports City; Attendance: 9,493; Referee: Jesús Valenzuela (Venezuela)

26 May 2025 34	Al-Ettifaq	2–1	Al-Wehda	Dammam
21:00	Radif 45'; Vitinho 90+6'	Report	El Yamiq (yellow card) 31', (goal) 70'	Stadium: EGO Stadium; Attendance: 3,733; Referee: Sami Al-Jires

=== King Cup ===
All times are local, AST (UTC+3).

22 September 2024 Round of 32	Al-Wehda	1–1 (a.e.t.) (4–2 p)	Al-Faisaly	Mecca
21:00	Ighalo 51'; Al-Alaeli (yellow card) 54'; Al-Qahtani (yellow card) 70'; Bacuna (yellow card) 86'; Al-Salem (yellow card) 97'; Darwish (yellow card) 101'; Bakshween (yellow card) 115'	Report	Souza 48'; Al-Badah (yellow card) 107'	Stadium: King Abdulaziz Sports City; Referee: Meshal Al-Shehri
	Penalties
	Ighalo (penalty scored); Goodwin (penalty scored); Bacuna (penalty missed); Amyn (penalty scored); Crețu (penalty scored)		(penalty scored) Souza; (penalty missed) Jawshan; (penalty scored) Al-Badah; (penalty missed) M. Majrashi

28 October 2024 Round of 16	Al-Wehda	1–2	Al-Qadsiah	Mecca
20:30	Bacuna 7'; Al-Najei (yellow card) 90+1'; Al-Muwallad (yellow card) 90+2'	Report	Quiñones 37', 45+4'; Hazazi (yellow card) 79'	Stadium: King Abdulaziz Sports City; Referee: Sebastian Gishamer (Austria)

== Statistics ==
=== Appearances ===
Last updated on 26 May 2025.

No.	Pos	Nat	Player	Total		Pro League		King Cup	
No.	Pos	Nat	Player	Apps	Goals	Apps	Goals	Apps	Goals
Goalkeepers
1	GK	(Saudi Arabia) KSA	Abdullah Al-Owaishir	28	0	27	0	1	0
47	GK	(Saudi Arabia) KSA	Ahmed Al-Rashidi	2	0	1+1	0	0	0
60	GK	(Saudi Arabia) KSA	Sultan Al-Harbi	0	0	0	0	0	0
71	GK	(Saudi Arabia) KSA	Abdullah Fallatah	0	0	0	0	0	0
Defenders
2	DF	(Saudi Arabia) KSA	Saeed Al-Muwallad	32	0	28+2	0	2	0
5	DF	(Morocco) MAR	Jawad El Yamiq	26	2	23+3	2	0	0
13	DF	(Saudi Arabia) KSA	Meshal Al-Alaeli	20	1	17+2	1	1	0
14	DF	(Saudi Arabia) KSA	Bandar Darwish	10	1	4+4	1	0+2	0
17	DF	(Saudi Arabia) KSA	Abdullah Al-Hafith	28	1	22+4	1	2	0
19	DF	(Saudi Arabia) KSA	Saad Al-Qahtani	9	0	0+7	0	1+1	0
22	DF	(Saudi Arabia) KSA	Ali Makki	22	0	14+8	0	0	0
44	DF	(Saudi Arabia) KSA	Redha Ambadu	0	0	0	0	0	0
49	DF	(Saudi Arabia) KSA	Ali Al-Salem	19	1	14+4	1	1	0
55	DF	(Saudi Arabia) KSA	Mohammed Al-Sufyani	0	0	0	0	0	0
Midfielders
4	MF	(Saudi Arabia) KSA	Waleed Bakshween	29	0	21+7	0	0+1	0
6	MF	(Romania) ROU	Alexandru Crețu	34	1	20+12	1	2	0
8	MF	(Saudi Arabia) KSA	Alaa Al Hejji	26	1	17+7	1	1+1	0
10	MF	(Curaçao) CUW	Juninho Bacuna	34	4	25+7	3	2	1
16	MF	(Saudi Arabia) KSA	Nawaf Al-Azizi	2	0	2	0	0	0
18	MF	(Tunisia) TUN	Saad Bguir	26	3	19+6	3	1	0
24	MF	(Sudan) SDN	Abdulaziz Noor	21	7	13+6	7	1+1	0
28	MF	(Saudi Arabia) KSA	Hussain Al-Eisa	13	0	0+13	0	0	0
35	MF	(Morocco) MAR	Mohamed Al Makahasi	30	1	22+6	1	1+1	0
80	MF	(Saudi Arabia) KSA	Yahya Al-Najei	24	1	7+16	1	0+1	0
Forwards
9	FW	(Nigeria) NGR	Odion Ighalo	34	7	30+2	6	0+2	1
11	FW	(Iraq) IRQ	Youssef Amyn	31	4	18+11	4	2	0
23	FW	(Australia) AUS	Craig Goodwin	30	6	23+5	6	1+1	0
77	FW	(Saudi Arabia) KSA	Mourad Khodari	20	3	2+16	3	2	0
Players sent out on loan this season
21	GK	(Saudi Arabia) KSA	Abdulrahman Al-Shammari	5	0	4	0	1	0
Player who made an appearance this season but have left the club
7	FW	(Netherlands) NED	Vito van Crooij	1	0	0+1	0	0	0
12	GK	(Uruguay) URU	Ignacio de Arruabarrena	2	0	2	0	0	0

=== Goalscorers ===
Rank	No.	Pos	Nat	Name	Pro League	King Cup	Total
1	9	FW	(Nigeria)	Odion Ighalo	6	1	7
1	24	MF	(Sudan)	Abdulaziz Noor	7	0	7
3	23	FW	(Australia)	Craig Goodwin	6	0	6
4	10	MF	(Curaçao)	Juninho Bacuna	3	1	4
4	11	FW	(Iraq)	Youssef Amyn	4	0	4
6	18	MF	(Tunisia)	Saad Bguir	3	0	3
6	77	FW	(Saudi Arabia)	Mourad Khodari	3	0	3
8	5	DF	(Morocco)	Jawad El Yamiq	2	0	2
9	6	MF	(Romania)	Alexandru Crețu	1	0	1
9	8	MF	(Saudi Arabia)	Alaa Al Hejji	1	0	1
9	13	DF	(Saudi Arabia)	Meshal Al-Alaeli	1	0	1
9	14	DF	(Saudi Arabia)	Bandar Darwish	1	0	1
9	17	DF	(Saudi Arabia)	Abdullah Al-Hafith	1	0	1
9	35	MF	(Morocco)	Mohamed Al Makahasi	1	0	1
9	49	DF	(Saudi Arabia)	Ali Al-Salem	1	0	1
9	80	MF	(Saudi Arabia)	Yahya Al-Najei	1	0	1
Own goal					0	0	0
Total					42	2	44

Last Updated: 26 May 2025

=== Assists ===
Rank	No.	Pos	Nat	Name	Pro League	King Cup	Total
1	23	FW	(Australia)	Craig Goodwin	7	0	7
2	10	MF	(Curaçao)	Juninho Bacuna	4	0	4
3	6	MF	(Romania)	Alexandru Crețu	3	0	3
3	8	MF	(Saudi Arabia)	Alaa Al Hejji	3	0	3
5	2	DF	(Saudi Arabia)	Saeed Al-Muwallad	2	0	2
5	9	FW	(Nigeria)	Odion Ighalo	2	0	2
5	11	FW	(Iraq)	Youssef Amyn	2	0	2
5	13	DF	(Saudi Arabia)	Meshal Al-Alaeli	1	1	2
9	1	GK	(Saudi Arabia)	Abdullah Al-Owaishir	1	0	1
9	22	DF	(Saudi Arabia)	Ali Makki	1	0	1
9	35	MF	(Morocco)	Mohamed Al Makahasi	1	0	1
9	49	DF	(Saudi Arabia)	Ali Al-Salem	1	0	1
Total					26	1	27

Last Updated: 26 May 2025

=== Clean sheets ===
Rank	No.	Pos	Nat	Name	Pro League	King Cup	Total
1	1	GK	(Saudi Arabia)	Abdullah Al-Owaishir	6	0	6
Total					6	0	6

Last Updated: 10 May 2025
