= List of UEFA European Championship own goals =

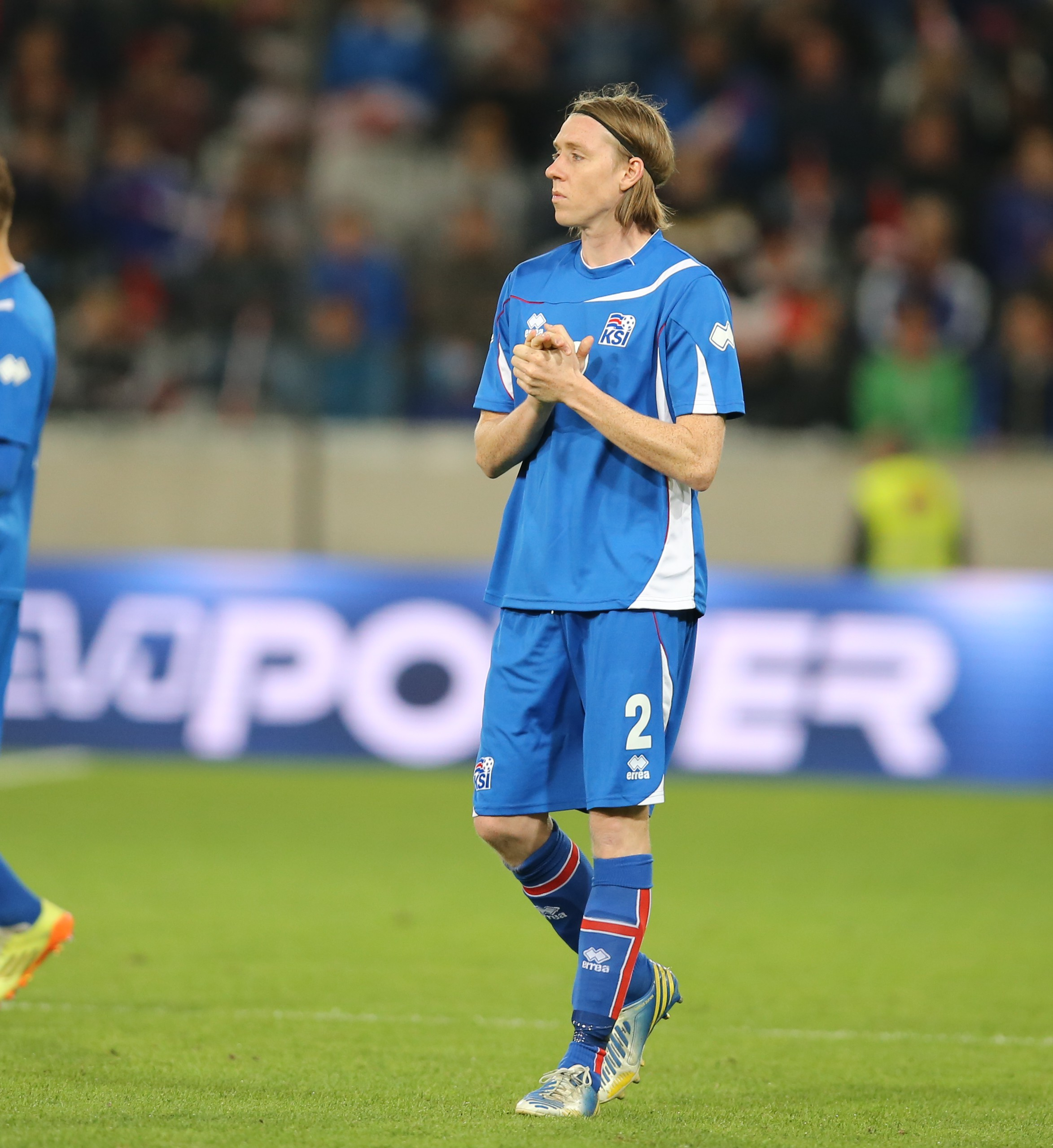
Birkir Már Sævarsson of Iceland scored the latest own goal in a European Championship match, taking place in the 88th minute of a 1–1 draw with Hungary.

This is a list of all own goals scored during UEFA European Championship matches, which does not include qualifying matches.

As UEFA is the governing body of football, only goals recorded as own goals by UEFA are noted. 30 total own goals have been scored in the European Championship tournaments to date, of which a record 11 were scored at UEFA Euro 2020, with another 10 coming at Euro 2024.

== Summary ==
The first European Championship own goal was scored by Anton Ondruš of Czechoslovakia while playing against the Netherlands in the semi-finals of the 1976 tournament, equalising Ondruš's earlier goal and pushing the game into extra time.

The next own goal took place twenty years later, with Lyuboslav Penev of Bulgaria scoring in the 1996 edition while playing against France.

At the following tournament, Dejan Govedarica of FR Yugoslavia scored an own goal while playing against the Netherlands in the quarter-finals of UEFA Euro 2000.

Four years later at UEFA Euro 2004, Igor Tudor of Croatia scored the fastest own goal in a match until Euro 2020 broke the record, taking place in the 22nd minute of his side's group stage match against France. Jorge Andrade of Portugal also scored an own goal at the tournament in the semi-finals against the Netherlands, making it the first European Championship to feature multiple own goals.

The next own goal was scored eight years later by Glen Johnson of England at UEFA Euro 2012, against Sweden in the group stage.

At UEFA Euro 2016, for the first time three own goals were scored in a single tournament. Ciaran Clark of the Republic of Ireland scored the first (playing against Sweden in the group stage), before Birkir Már Sævarsson of Iceland scored an own goal five days later while playing against Hungary. To date, Sævarsson's own goal is the latest in European Championship history, occurring in the 88th minute. One week later, Gareth McAuley of Northern Ireland scored the third own goal of the tournament, while playing in the round of 16 against Wales.

The first own goal of UEFA Euro 2020 came in the tournament's opening game, as Merih Demiral of Turkey put through his own net to open the scoring in a 3–0 loss to Italy; it was the first time the opening goal of a European Championship was awarded as an own goal. The first own goal scored by a goalkeeper occurred just three days later, where Wojciech Szczęsny of Poland unluckily had the ball bounce off the post, off his back, and into the net while playing against Slovakia. This broke Igor Tudor’s record of the fastest own goal in a match. The following day, Mats Hummels of Germany scored an own goal in his side's loss to France, which saw the 2020 tournament equal the previous edition's record total of three own goals in only the first round of matches. In Germany's following match against Portugal, Portuguese defenders Rúben Dias and Raphaël Guerreiro each scored an own goal in the span of less than five minutes; this was the first individual match with two own goals in tournament history, and also took Euro 2020's own goal tally to five, breaking its tie with the 2016 edition for most own goals in a single tournament. Two days later, on 21 June, Finland goalkeeper Lukáš Hrádecký scored an own goal in their last group stage match against Belgium, bringing the record to six goals. On 23 June, goalkeeper Martin Dúbravka and midfielder Juraj Kucka of Slovakia each scored an own goal in their final group stage match against Spain, becoming the second match with multiple own goals. On 28 June, midfielder Pedri of Spain scored an own goal after a missed back-pass to the goalkeeper during his side's Round of 16 match against Croatia, bringing the number of own goals in the tournament to nine, as many as in the previous 15 competitions combined. This was then exceeded on 2 July when Swiss midfielder Denis Zakaria scored an own goal during his team's quarter-final match against Spain, which broke Wojciech Szczęsny’s record of the fastest own goal in a match. Five days later, another own goal occurred during the semi-final match-up between Denmark and England where Simon Kjær scored an own goal in the 39th minute bringing the total number of own goals in Euro 2020 to 11.

== Own goals ==
Key
| Player's team won the match |
| Player's team drew the match (a penalty shoot-out is recorded as a draw regardless of shootout results) |
| Player's team lost the match |

| No. | Player | Time | Representing | Goal | Final score | Opponent | Tournament | Round | Date | UEFA report |
|---|---|---|---|---|---|---|---|---|---|---|
| 1 | Anton Ondruš | 73' | Czechoslovakia | 1–1 | 3–1 (a.e.t.) | Netherlands | 1976, Yugoslavia | Semi-finals | 16 June 1976 | Report |
| 2 | Lyuboslav Penev | 63' | Bulgaria | 0–2 | 1–3 | France | 1996, England | Group stage | 18 June 1996 | Report |
| 3 | Dejan Govedarica | 51' | FR Yugoslavia | 0–3 | 1–6 | Netherlands | 2000, Belgium & Netherlands | Quarter-finals | 25 June 2000 | Report |
| 4 | Igor Tudor | 22' | Croatia | 0–1 | 2–2 | France | 2004, Portugal | Group stage | 17 June 2004 | Report |
| 5 | Jorge Andrade | 63' | Portugal | 2–1 | 2–1 | Netherlands | 2004, Portugal | Semi-finals | 30 June 2004 | Report |
| 6 | Glen Johnson | 49' | England | 1–1 | 3–2 | Sweden | 2012, Poland & Ukraine | Group stage | 15 June 2012 | Report |
| 7 | Ciaran Clark | 71' | Republic of Ireland | 1–1 | 1–1 | Sweden | 2016, France | Group stage | 13 June 2016 | Report |
| 8 | Birkir Már Sævarsson | 88' | Iceland | 1–1 | 1–1 | Hungary | 2016, France | Group stage | 18 June 2016 | Report |
| 9 | Gareth McAuley | 75' | Northern Ireland | 0–1 | 0–1 | Wales | 2016, France | Round of 16 | 25 June 2016 | Report |
| 10 | Merih Demiral | 53' | Turkey | 0–1 | 0–3 | Italy | 2020, Pan-European | Group stage | 11 June 2021 | Report |
| 11 | Wojciech Szczęsny | 18' | Poland | 0–1 | 1–2 | Slovakia | 2020, Pan-European | Group stage | 14 June 2021 | Report |
| 12 | Mats Hummels | 20' | Germany | 0–1 | 0–1 | France | 2020, Pan-European | Group stage | 15 June 2021 | Report |
| 13 | Rúben Dias | 35' | Portugal | 1–1 | 2–4 | Germany | 2020, Pan-European | Group stage | 19 June 2021 | Report |
| 14 | Raphaël Guerreiro | 39' | Portugal | 1–2 | 2–4 | Germany | 2020, Pan-European | Group stage | 19 June 2021 | Report |
| 15 | Lukas Hradecky | 74' | Finland | 0–1 | 0–2 | Belgium | 2020, Pan-European | Group stage | 21 June 2021 | Report |
| 16 | Martin Dúbravka | 30' | Slovakia | 0–1 | 0–5 | Spain | 2020, Pan-European | Group stage | 23 June 2021 | Report |
| 17 | Juraj Kucka | 71' | Slovakia | 0–5 | 0–5 | Spain | 2020, Pan-European | Group stage | 23 June 2021 | Report |
| 18 | Pedri | 20' | Spain | 0–1 | 5–3 (a.e.t.) | Croatia | 2020, Pan-European | Round of 16 | 28 June 2021 | Report |
| 19 | Denis Zakaria | 8' | Switzerland | 0–1 | 1–1 (a.e.t.) (Note: Switzerland lost 1–3 on penalty kicks.) | Spain | 2020, Pan-European | Quarter-finals | 2 July 2021 | Report |
| 20 | Simon Kjær | 39' | Denmark | 1–1 | 1–2 (a.e.t.) | England | 2020, Pan-European | Semi-finals | 7 July 2021 | Report |
| 21 | Antonio Rüdiger | 87' | Germany | 4–1 | 5–1 | Scotland | 2024, Germany | Group stage | 14 June 2024 | Report |
| 22 | Maximilian Wöber | 38' | Austria | 0–1 | 0–1 | France | 2024, Germany | Group stage | 17 June 2024 | Report |
| 23 | Robin Hranáč | 69' | Czech Republic | 1–1 | 1–2 | Portugal | 2024, Germany | Group stage | 18 June 2024 | Report |
| 24 | Klaus Gjasula | 76' | Albania | 1–2 | 2–2 | Croatia | 2024, Germany | Group stage | 19 June 2024 | Report |
| 25 | Riccardo Calafiori | 55' | Italy | 0–1 | 0–1 | Spain | 2024, Germany | Group stage | 20 June 2024 | Report |
| 26 | Samet Akaydin | 28' | Turkey | 0–2 | 0–3 | Portugal | 2024, Germany | Group stage | 22 June 2024 | Report |
| 27 | Donyell Malen | 6' | Netherlands | 0–1 | 2–3 | Austria | 2024, Germany | Group stage | 25 June 2024 | Report |
| 28 | Robin Le Normand | 18' | Spain | 0–1 | 4–1 | Georgia | 2024, Germany | Round of 16 | 30 June 2024 | Report |
| 29 | Jan Vertonghen | 85' | Belgium | 0–1 | 0–1 | France | 2024, Germany | Round of 16 | 1 July 2024 | Report |
| 30 | Mert Müldür | 76' | Turkey | 1–2 | 1–2 | Netherlands | 2024, Germany | Quarter-finals | 6 July 2024 | Report |

=== By team ===
Own goals by nations (Note: The totals in each column do not match because the 1976 own goal by Czechoslovakia is inherited by both Czech Republic and Slovakia.)
| Team | Own goals by | |
| Team | own players | opponents |
|---|---|---|
| Turkey | 3 | 0 |
| Slovakia (Note: Includes 1976 own goal by Czechoslovakia.) | 3 | 1 |
| Portugal | 3 | 2 |
| Czech Republic | 2 | 0 |
| Germany | 2 | 2 |
| Spain | 2 | 4 |
| Albania | 1 | 0 |
| Bulgaria | 1 | 0 |
| Denmark | 1 | 0 |
| Finland | 1 | 0 |
| Iceland | 1 | 0 |
| Northern Ireland | 1 | 0 |
| Poland | 1 | 0 |
| Republic of Ireland | 1 | 0 |
| Serbia (Note: Includes 2000 own goal by FR Yugoslavia.) | 1 | 0 |
| Switzerland | 1 | 0 |
| Austria | 1 | 1 |
| Belgium | 1 | 1 |
| England | 1 | 1 |
| Italy | 1 | 1 |
| Croatia | 1 | 2 |
| Netherlands | 1 | 4 |
| Georgia | 0 | 1 |
| Hungary | 0 | 1 |
| Scotland | 0 | 1 |
| Wales | 0 | 1 |
| Sweden | 0 | 2 |
| France | 0 | 5 |

== Statistics and notable own goals ==
Time and distance

- First own goal

- Anton Ondruš, Czechoslovakia vs Netherlands, 1976

- First own goal by a goalkeeper

- Wojciech Szczęsny, Poland vs Slovakia, 2020

- Fastest own goal

- Donyell Malen, 6', Netherlands vs Austria, 2024

- Latest own goal

- Birkir Már Sævarsson, 88', Iceland vs Hungary, 2016

- Longest own goal in a match

- Pedri, 44 metres (this is also the longest own goal scored at any major tournament), Spain vs Croatia, 2020

- Matches with two own goals

- Portugal vs Germany, 2020; Rúben Dias and Raphaël Guerreiro of Portugal each scored for Germany
- Slovakia vs Spain, 2020; Martin Dúbravka and Juraj Kucka of Slovakia each scored for Spain
Tournament

- Most own goals, tournament

- 11 (2020)

- Tournaments without own goals

- 1960, 1964, 1968, 1972, 1980, 1984, 1988, 1992, 2008

- Most own goals by a team in one tournament

- 2, Portugal (2020), Slovakia (2020), Turkey (2024)

- Most own goals in favour of a team in one tournament

- 3, Spain (2020)
Teams

- Most own goals by a team, overall

- 3, Portugal, Slovakia, Turkey

- Most own goals in favour of a team, overall

- 5, France

- Most matches, never scoring an own goal

- 49, France

- Most matches, never benefiting from an own goal

- 40, Czech Republic (Note: Includes results of Czechoslovakia between 1960–1980.)

- Most matches, never scoring or benefiting from an own goal

- 36, Russia

- Teams to have scored multiple own goals for the same opponent

- Portugal scored two own goals for Germany (2020)
- Slovakia scored two own goals for Spain (2020)
Players

- Youngest player with an own goal

- Pedri, age 18, Spain vs Croatia, 2020

- Oldest player with an own goal

- Jan Vertonghen, age 37, Belgium vs France, 2024

- Players who have scored own goals and regular goals

- Anton Ondruš of Czechoslovakia scored against the Netherlands in 1976
- Dejan Govedarica of FR Yugoslavia scored against Spain in 2000
- Igor Tudor of Croatia scored against England in 2004
- Gareth McAuley of Northern Ireland scored against Ukraine in 2016
- Raphaël Guerreiro of Portugal scored against Hungary in 2020
- Merih Demiral of Turkey scored twice against Austria in 2024
- Klaus Gjasula of Albania scored against Croatia in 2024
- Samet Akaydin of Turkey scored against the Netherlands in 2024
- Donyell Malen of the Netherlands scored twice against Romania in 2024
- Mert Müldür of Turkey scored against Georgia in 2024

- Players to score for both teams in a match

- Anton Ondruš, Czechoslovakia vs Netherlands, 1976
- Klaus Gjasula, Albania vs Croatia, 2024

== See also ==
- List of FIFA Women's World Cup own goals
- List of FIFA World Cup own goals
