= List of FIFA Women's World Cup own goals =

Of the 1,081 goals scored in matches at the nine final tournaments of the FIFA Women's World Cup, only 33 have been own goals. In 1997, FIFA published guidelines for classifying an own goal as "when a player plays the ball directly into his own net or when he redirects an opponent’s shot, cross or pass into his own goal", and excludes "shots that are on target (i.e. goal-bound) and touch a defender or rebound from the goal frame and bounce off a defender or goalkeeper". This is a list of all own goals scored during FIFA Women's World Cup matches (not including qualification games).

The United States has scored four own goals for their opponents, while Norway has benefited from five own goals. Of the 31 (Note: Two matches had two own goals.) matches with own goals, the team scoring the own goal has won five times and drawn three times. (Note: As per statistical convention in football, matches decided in extra time are counted as wins and losses, while matches decided by penalty shoot-outs are counted as draws.) All but eight own goals have been scored in the group stage of the tournament.

The only player to score two own goals is Angie Ponce from Ecuador, scoring twice for Switzerland in 2015. She later scored Ecuador's first World Cup goal in the same match.

== List ==
Key
Player's team won the match
Player's team drew the match

Seq.	Player	Time	Representing	Goal	Final score	Opponent	Tournament	Round	Date	FIFA report
1	Terry McCahill	30'	New Zealand	0–1	0–4	Norway	1991, China	Group stage	19 November 1991	report
2	Sayuri Yamaguchi	70'	Japan	0–8	0–8	Sweden	1991, China	Group stage	19 November 1991	report
3	Ifeanyi Chiejine	19'	Nigeria	1–1	1–7	United States	1999, United States	Group stage	24 June 1999	report
4	Hiromi Isozaki	26'	Japan	0–2	0–4	Norway	1999, United States	Group stage	26 June 1999	report
5	Brandi Chastain	5'	United States	0–1	3–2	Germany	1999, United States	Quarter-finals	1 July 1999	report
6	Dianne Alagich	39'	Australia	1–1	1–2	Russia	2003, United States	Group stage	21 September 2003	report
7	Eva González	9'	Argentina	0–1	1–6	England	2007, China	Group stage	17 September 2007	report
8	Trine Rønning	42'	Norway	0–1	0–3	Germany	2007, China	Semi-finals	26 September 2007	report
9	Leslie Osborne	20'	United States	0–1	0–4	Brazil	2007, China	Semi-finals	27 September 2007	report
10	Amy LePeilbet	35'	United States	0–2	1–2	Sweden	2011, Germany	Group stage	6 July 2011	report
11	Daiane	2'	Brazil	0–1	2–2^{aet} (Note: Brazil lost 3–5 on penalty kicks.)	United States	2011, Germany	Quarter-finals	10 July 2011	report
12	Desire Oparanozie	21'	Nigeria	0–1	3–3	Sweden	2015, Canada	Group stage	8 June 2015	report
13	Angie Ponce	24'	Ecuador	0–1	1–10	Switzerland	2015, Canada	Group stage	12 June 2015	report
14	Angie Ponce	71'	Ecuador	1–8	1–10	Switzerland	2015, Canada	Group stage	12 June 2015	report
15	Jennifer Ruiz	9'	Mexico	0–2	0–5	France	2015, Canada	Group stage	17 June 2015	report
16	Laura Bassett	90+2'	England	1–2	1–2	Japan	2015, Canada	Semi-finals	1 July 2015	report
17	Julie Johnston	52'	United States	4–2	5–2	Japan	2015, Canada	Final	5 July 2015	report
18	Osinachi Ohale	37'	Nigeria	0–3	0–3	Norway	2019, France	Group stage	8 June 2019	report
19	Kim Do-yeon	29'	South Korea	0–1	0–2	Nigeria	2019, France	Group stage	12 June 2019	report
20	Wendie Renard	54'	France	1–1	2–1	Norway	2019, France	Group stage	12 June 2019	report
21	Mônica	66'	Brazil	2–3	2–3	Australia	2019, France	Group stage	13 June 2019	report
22	Lee Alexander	79'	Scotland	3–2	3–3	Argentina	2019, France	Group stage	19 June 2019	report
23	Aurelle Awona	80'	Cameroon	1–1	2–1	New Zealand	2019, France	Group stage	20 June 2019	report
24	Waraporn Boonsing	48'	Thailand	0–1	0–2	Chile	2019, France	Group stage	20 June 2019	report
25	Jonna Andersson	50'	Sweden	0–2	0–2	United States	2019, France	Group stage	20 June 2019	report
26	Valeria del Campo	21'	Costa Rica	0–1	0–3	Spain	2023, Australia / New Zealand	Group stage	21 July 2023	report
27	Hanane Aït El Haj	54'	Morocco	0–4	0–6	Germany	2023, Australia / New Zealand	Group stage	24 July 2023	report
28	Zineb Redouani	79'	Morocco	0–5	0–6	Germany	2023, Australia / New Zealand	Group stage	24 July 2023	report
29	Megan Connolly	45+5'	Republic of Ireland	1–1	1–2	Canada	2023, Australia / New Zealand	Group stage	26 July 2023	report
30	Alicia Barker	48'	Philippines	0–4	0–6	Norway	2023, Australia / New Zealand	Group stage	30 July 2023	report
31	Benedetta Orsi	32'	Italy	1–1	2–3	South Africa	2023, Australia / New Zealand	Group stage	2 August 2023	report
32	Laia Codina	11'	Spain	1–1	5–1	Switzerland	2023, Australia / New Zealand	Round of 16	5 August 2023	report
33	Ingrid Syrstad Engen	15'	Norway	0–1	1–3	Japan	2023, Australia / New Zealand	Round of 16	5 August 2023	report

== Statistics and notable own goals ==
=== Tournament ===
- Most own goals, tournament: 8 – 2019 and 2023
- Tournaments without own goals: 1995
- Only own goal in a final match: Julie Johnston, against United States v Japan, 2015.
- Matches with two own goals:
  - Ecuador vs Switzerland, 2015. Angie Ponce of Ecuador scored twice for Switzerland.
  - Germany vs Morocco, 2023. Hanane Aït El Haj and Zineb Redouani of Morocco each scored for Germany.

=== Teams ===
- Most own goals by a team: 4 – United States (1999, 2007, 2011, 2015)
- Most own goals in favour of a team: 5 – Norway (1991, 1999, 2019 (x2), 2023)
- Most own goals by a team in one tournament: 2
  - Ecuador (2015)
  - Morocco (2023)
- Most own goals in favour of a team in one tournament: 2
  - Switzerland (2015)
  - Japan (2015)
  - Norway (2019)
  - Germany (2023)
- Most matches, never scoring an own goal: 47 – Germany (1991–2023)
- Most matches, never benefiting from an own goal: 36 – China (1991–2023)
- Most matches, never scoring or benefiting from an own goal: 36 – China (1991–2023)
- Teams to have scored multiple own goals for the same opponent:
  - Ecuador scored two own goals for Switzerland (2015)
  - Morocco scored two own goals for Germany (2023)
- Pairs of teams to have scored own goals for each other:
  - United States and Brazil (2007, 2011)
  - United States and Sweden (2011, 2019)
  - Japan and Norway (1999, 2023)

=== Players ===
- Most own goals by a player: 2 – Angie Ponce, against Ecuador, twice for Switzerland in 2015
- Youngest player with an own goal: 16 years, 38 days – Ifeanyi Chiejine, against Nigeria v United States, 1999
- Oldest player with an own goal: 32 years, 53 days, Mônica, against Brazil v Australia, 2019
- Players who have scored own goals and regular goals
  - Brandi Chastain of the United States scored against Germany in 1999
  - Eva González of Argentina scored against England in 2007
  - Trine Rønning of Norway scored against Thailand in 2015
  - Angie Ponce of Ecuador scored against Switzerland in 2015
  - Wendie Renard of France scored twice against South Korea, once against Nigeria, and once against the United States in 2019, and once against Brazil in 2023
  - Julie Ertz (née Johnston) of the United States scored against Chile in 2019
  - Laia Codina of Spain scored against Switzerland in 2023
- Players to score for both teams in a match
  - Brandi Chastain, United States vs Germany, 1999
  - Eva González, Argentina vs England, 2007
  - Angie Ponce, Ecuador vs Switzerland, 2015 (two own goals, one regular goal)
  - Laia Codina, Spain vs Switzerland, 2023

=== Time ===
- First ever own goal: Terry McCahill, against New Zealand v Norway, 1991.
- Fastest own goal: 2nd minute – Daiane, against Brazil v United States, 2011.
- Latest regulation-time own goal: 90+2nd minute – Laura Bassett, against England v Japan, 2015.

=== Various ===
  - The own goal scored by Brazilian Mônica for Australia in 2019 was the first own goal to be confirmed by VAR.
  - Club (FC Barcelona Femení) teammates Laia Codina from Spain and Ingrid Syrstad Engen from Norway both scored own goals, in different matches, on the same day (5 August 2023).
  - After scoring one own goal for Japan in 2023 (0–1), Ingrid Syrstad Engen from Norway was the last player to connect with the ball that went in for Japan's next goal (1–2); as the initial strike from Japan's Risa Shimizu was on target, it was not recorded as a second own goal.
  - Ecuador has scored more own goals (two) than regular goals (one).
  - Morocco has scored as many own goals (two) as regular goals (two).
  - Chile has benefited from as many own goals (one) as regular goals (one).

== By team ==
Own goals by nations
Team	Own goals by	
Team	own players	opponents
United States	4	3
Nigeria	3	1
Ecuador	2	0
Morocco	2	0
Brazil	2	1
Japan	2	3
Norway	2	5
Cameroon	1	0
Costa Rica	1	0
Italy	1	0
Mexico	1	0
Philippines	1	0
Republic of Ireland	1	0
Scotland	1	0
South Korea	1	0
Thailand	1	0
Argentina	1	1
Australia	1	1
England	1	1
France	1	1
New Zealand	1	1
Spain	1	1
Sweden	1	3
Canada	0	1
Chile	0	1
Russia	0	1
South Africa	0	1
Switzerland	0	3
Germany	0	4

== See also ==
- List of UEFA European Championship own goals
- List of FIFA World Cup own goals
