= Juninho Bacuna =

Dutch-Curacaoan footballer (born 1997)

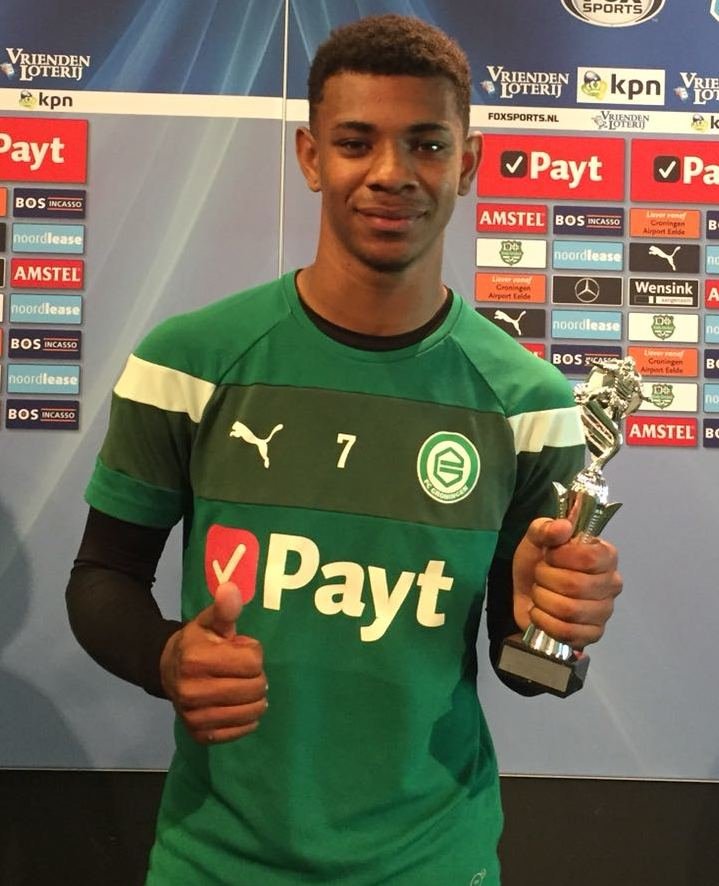
- Bacuna in 2018

Personal information
- Full name: Juninho Gracielo Bacuna
- Date of birth: 7 August 1997 (age 29)
- Place of birth: Groningen, Netherlands
- Height: 1.78 m (5 ft 10 in)
- Position: Central midfielder

Team information
- Current team: Gaziantep

Youth career
- FC Lewenborg
- 2005–2006: GRC Groningen
- 2006–2015: Groningen

Senior career*
| Years | Team | Apps | (Gls) |
| 2015–2018 | Groningen | 87 | (2) |
| 2021–2022 | Rangers | 6 | (1) |
| 2022–2024 | Birmingham City | 105 | (11) |
| 2024–2025 | Al-Wehda | 32 | (3) |
| 2025– | Gaziantep | 12 | (0) |
| 2026 | → Volendam (loan) | 13 | (0) |

International career^{‡}
| 2015–2016 | Netherlands U18 | 2 | (0) |
| 2016–2018 | Netherlands U20 | 11 | (0) |
| 2018–2019 | Netherlands U21 | 3 | (2) |
| 2019– | Curaçao | 57 | (16) |
- * Club domestic league appearances and goals as of 19 September 2026 ‡ National team caps and goals as of 4 October 2026 (UTC)

Juninho Gracielo Bacuna (born 7 August 1997) is a professional footballer who plays as a central midfielder for Turkish Süper Lig club Gaziantep. Born in the Netherlands, he represents the Curaçao national team.

Bacuna began his career in his native Netherlands with Groningen before moving to English football with Huddersfield Town. After one season in the Premier League and two in the second-tier Championship, he spent six months with Scottish Premiership club Rangers and then returned to English football with Birmingham City in 2022. He left for Al-Wehda in 2024. In international football, he played for the Netherlands up to under-21 level before switching in 2019 to represent Curaçao, for which he qualified by descent.

== Club career ==
=== Groningen ===
Bacuna is a Groningen youth exponent. He made his Eredivisie debut on 5 February 2015 against Heracles Almelo replacing Yoell van Nieff after 79 minutes in a 2–2 away draw. He came off the bench to help the Green-White Army win the KNVB Cup in the 2014–15 season against defending champions PEC Zwolle. It was their first major trophy and they qualified for the UEFA Europa League.

=== Rangers ===
On 19 August 2021, Bacuna signed for Scottish Premiership team Rangers. The player was paraded to the club's supporters during the half-time interval of Rangers' Europa League play-off game against Alashkert.

=== Birmingham City ===
Bacuna returned to English football when he joined Championship club Birmingham City on 27 January 2022 on a three-and-a-half-year contract; the fee was undisclosed. He scored his first Birmingham goal in a 3–0 win at home to Luton Town on 12 February, and finished the season with two goals and three assists from 17 appearances.

At the start of the 2022–23 season new head coach John Eustace impressed on Bacuna that there was no doubt as to his exceptional talent with the ball but he needed to combine that with hard work off the ball, particularly in a small squad "over-reliant on [him] to create goal scoring opportunities". By October he was filling in at wing back, from which position he scored a goal-of-the-season candidate away to Hull City. As the season went on, his concentration improved and Eustace suggested he was maturing as a player. He missed 3 Championship matches through suspension, and ended up with six assists from the remaining 43.

=== Al-Wehda FC ===
Bacuna signed for Saudi Pro League club Al-Wehda on 28 August 2024 for an undisclosed fee.

=== Gaziantep ===
On 11 July 2025, Gaziantep announced the signing of Bacuna for an undisclosed fee.

=== Volendam (loan) ===
On 3 February 2026, Bacuna joined Eredivisie side Volendam on a half-a-year long loan.

== International career ==
Bacuna represented his native Netherlands at under-18, under-20 and under-21 levels. He played eleven matches for the under-20s, and three for the under-21s, and scored twice in a 4–1 win against Bolivia.

He switched to represent Curaçao, for which he qualified by descent, in 2019. He played four matches in that year's CONCACAF Nations League A group stage, and once international football resumed after the COVID-19 pandemic, continued as a regular in the team.

In September 2022, Bacuna played two friendly matches for Curaçao against the Indonesia national team in Indonesia. In the first, he scored in a 3–2 defeat. In the second, he was sent off after receiving a second yellow card for a bad tackle on Marselino Ferdinan. He reacted to the dismissal by kicking the ball towards spectators, who retaliated by throwing water bottles onto the pitch. After the match, Bacuna was targeted on social media with abusive messages, some of a racist nature. His club issued a statement condemning the abuse and confirmed that it had been reported to the social media platforms.

On 18 May 2026, he was named by head coach Dick Advocaat in the 26-man squad for the 2026 FIFA World Cup, marking the country's first-ever appearance at the tournament.

== Personal life ==
Bacuna is the younger brother of fellow footballers Leandro Bacuna and Johnsen Bacuna. Leandro and Juninho both played as starting midfielders for Curaçao in the 2026 World Cup.

His name was chosen in honor of the Brazilian soccer player Juninho Pernambucano, a star for CR Vasco da Gama and Olympique Lyonnais.

== Career statistics ==
=== Club ===
As of match played 19 September 2026

Appearances and goals by club, season and competition
| Club | Season | League | | | National cup (Note: Includes KNVB Cup, FA Cup, Scottish Cup, King's Cup) | | League cup (Note: Includes EFL Cup, Scottish League Cup) | | Continental | | Other | | Total | |
| Club | Season | Division | Apps | Goals | Apps | Goals | Apps | Goals | Apps | Goals | Apps | Goals | Apps | Goals |
|---|---|---|---|---|---|---|---|---|---|---|---|---|---|---|
| Groningen | 2014–15 | Eredivisie | 12 | 0 | 2 | 0 | — | | 0 | 0 | — | | 14 | 0 |
| Groningen | 2015–16 | Eredivisie | 14 | 0 | 1 | 0 | — | | 1 (Note: Appearance(s) in UEFA Europa League) | 0 | 3 (Note: One appearance in Johan Cruyff Shield, two in Eredivisie European competition play-offs) | 0 | 19 | 0 |
| Groningen | 2016–17 | Eredivisie | 24 | 1 | 0 | 0 | — | | — | | 2 (Note: Appearances in Eredivisie European competition play-offs) | 0 | 26 | 1 |
| Groningen | 2017–18 | Eredivisie | 33 | 1 | 2 | 2 | — | | — | | — | | 35 | 3 |
| Groningen | Total | | 83 | 2 | 5 | 2 | — | | 1 | 0 | 5 | 0 | 94 | 4 |
| Rangers | 2021–22 | Scottish Premiership | 6 | 1 | 1 | 0 | 1 | 0 | 4 | 0 | — | | 12 | 1 |
| Birmingham City | 2021–22 | Championship | 17 | 2 | — | | — | | — | | — | | 17 | 2 |
| Birmingham City | 2022–23 | Championship | 43 | 2 | 3 | 0 | 0 | 0 | — | | — | | 46 | 2 |
| Birmingham City | 2023–24 | Championship | 45 | 7 | 1 | 0 | 2 | 2 | — | | — | | 48 | 9 |
| Birmingham City | Total | | 105 | 11 | 4 | 0 | 2 | 2 | — | | — | | 111 | 13 |
| Al-Wehda | 2024–25 | Saudi Pro League | 32 | 3 | 2 | 1 | — | | — | | — | | 34 | 4 |
| Gaziantep | 2025–26 | Süper Lig | 9 | 0 | 3 | 1 | — | | — | | — | | 12 | 1 |
| Gaziantep | 2026–27 | Süper Lig | 3 | 0 | 0 | 0 | — | | — | | — | | 3 | 0 |
| Gaziantep | Total | | 12 | 0 | 3 | 1 | — | | — | | — | | 15 | 1 |
| Volendam (loan) | 2025–26 | Eredivisie | 13 | 0 | — | | — | | — | | 2 (Note: Appearances in relegation play-offs) | 0 | 15 | 0 |
| Career total | | | 353 | 29 | 17 | 4 | 6 | 2 | 5 | 0 | 7 | 0 | 390 | 33 |

=== International ===
As of match played 4 October 2026

Appearances and goals by national team and year
| National team | Year | Apps | Goals |
|---|---|---|---|
| Curaçao | 2019 | 4 | 0 |
| Curaçao | 2021 | 8 | 2 |
| Curaçao | 2022 | 5 | 1 |
| Curaçao | 2023 | 10 | 2 |
| Curaçao | 2024 | 8 | 6 |
| Curaçao | 2025 | 11 | 2 |
| Curaçao | 2026 | 11 | 3 |
| Total | | 57 | 16 |

Scores and results list Curaçao's goal tally first; score column indicates score after each Bacuna goal.

List of international goals scored by Juninho Bacuna
| No. | Date | Venue | Opponent | Score | Result | Competition | Ref. |
|---|---|---|---|---|---|---|---|
| 1 | 25 March 2021 | Ergilio Hato Stadium, Willemstad, Curaçao | Saint Vincent and the Grenadines | 1–0 | 5–0 | 2022 FIFA World Cup qualification | |
| 2 | 25 March 2021 | Ergilio Hato Stadium, Willemstad, Curaçao | Saint Vincent and the Grenadines | 3–0 | 5–0 | 2022 FIFA World Cup qualification | |
| 3 | 24 September 2022 | Gelora Bandung Lautan Api Stadium, Bandung, Indonesia | Indonesia | 2–2 | 2–3 | Friendly | |
| 4 | 17 October 2022 | Ergilio Hato Stadium, Willemstad, Curaçao | Trinidad and Tobago | 4–2 | 5–3 | 2023–24 CONCACAF Nations League A | |
| 5 | 16 November 2023 | Ergilio Hato Stadium, Willemstad, Curaçao | El Salvador | 1–0 | 1–1 | Friendly | |
| 6 | 8 June 2024 | Trinidad Stadium, Oranjestad, Aruba | Aruba | 1–0 | 2–0 | 2026 FIFA World Cup qualification | |
| 7 | 9 September 2024 | Kirani James Athletic Stadium, St. George's, Grenada | Saint Martin | 1–0 | 4–0 | 2024–25 CONCACAF Nations League B | |
| 8 | 14 October 2024 | Daren Sammy Cricket Ground, Gros Islet, Saint Lucia | Grenada | 1–0 | 1–0 | 2024–25 CONCACAF Nations League B | |
| 9 | 15 November 2024 | Ergilio Hato Stadium, Willemstad, Curaçao | Saint Martin | 4–0 | 5–0 | 2024–25 CONCACAF Nations League B | |
| 10 | 18 November 2024 | Ergilio Hato Stadium, Willemstad, Curaçao | Saint Lucia | 3–1 | 4–1 | 2024–25 CONCACAF Nations League B | |
| 11 | 18 November 2024 | Ergilio Hato Stadium, Willemstad, Curaçao | Saint Lucia | 4–1 | 4–1 | 2024–25 CONCACAF Nations League B | |
| 12 | 6 June 2025 | Ergilio Hato Stadium, Willemstad, Curaçao | Saint Lucia | 4–0 | 4–0 | 2026 FIFA World Cup qualification | |
| 13 | 13 November 2025 | Bermuda National Stadium, Devonshire Parish, Bermuda | Bermuda | 2–0 | 7–0 | 2026 FIFA World Cup qualification | |
| 14 | 6 June 2026 | Ergilio Hato Stadium, Willemstad, Curaçao | Aruba | 4–0 | 4–0 | Friendly | |
| 15 | 27 September 2026 | Ergilio Hato Stadium, Willemstad, Curaçao | Nicaragua | 4–0 | 6–1 | 2026–27 CONCACAF Nations League A | |
| 16 | 1 October 2026 | Ergilio Hato Stadium, Willemstad, Curaçao | Trinidad and Tobago | 1–0 | 1–0 | 2026–27 CONCACAF Nations League A | |
