= Youssef Amyn =

Footballer (born 2003)

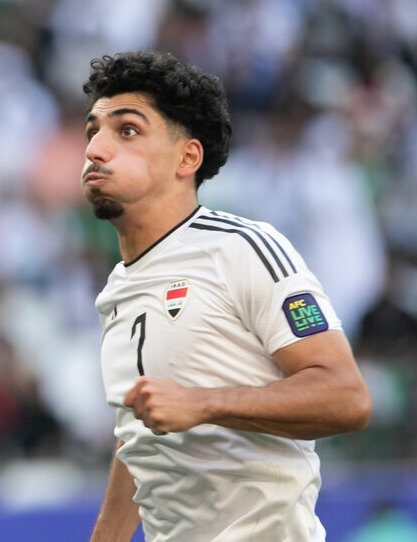
- Amyn playing for Iraq at the 2023 AFC Asian Cup

Personal information
- Full name: Youssef Wali Faeq Amyn
- Date of birth: 21 August 2003 (age 23)
- Place of birth: Essen, Germany
- Height: 1.72 m (5 ft 8 in)
- Position: Winger

Team information
- Current team: AEK Larnaca
- Number: 8

Youth career
- 2007–2012: TuS Querenburg
- 2012–2015: VfL Bochum
- 2015–2020: Borussia Dortmund
- 2020–2021: Viktoria Köln

Senior career*
| Years | Team | Apps | (Gls) |
| 2021–2022 | Viktoria Köln | 35 | (5) |
| 2022–2023 | Feyenoord | 0 | (0) |
| 2023–2024 | Eintracht Braunschweig | 9 | (0) |
| 2024–2025 | Al Wehda | 29 | (4) |
| 2025– | AEK Larnaca | 14 | (2) |

International career^{‡}
| 2021–2022 | Germany U19 | 10 | (2) |
| 2023 | Iraq U20 | 5 | (1) |
| 2024 | Iraq Olympic | 3 | (0) |
| 2023– | Iraq | 28 | (2) |
- * Club domestic league appearances and goals as of 14 February 2026 ‡ National team caps and goals as of 23 June 2026

Youssef Wali Faeq Amyn (Kurdish: یووسف وەلی فایەق ئەمین, romanized: Ûsif Welî Fayeq Emîn, Arabic: يوسف والي فائق أمين; born 21 August 2003) is a professional footballer who plays as a winger for Cypriot First Division club AEK Larnaca. Born in Germany, he plays for the Iraq national team.

== Club career ==
=== Viktoria Köln ===
In 2020, Amyn left the academy of Borussia Dortmund to join the youth side of Viktoria Köln. He made his professional debut for the club on 13 March 2021 in a 3–1 league win against MSV Duisburg. This made him the youngest player to appear in a professional match for the club in its history. He also made an appearance in the semi final of the Middle Rhine Cup, which his team went on to win, marking the first trophy of his career.

Amyn made his first start on the opening matchday of the 2021–22 season, scoring his first goal for the club in a 2–1 defeat to Viktoria Berlin. He scored six goals from 36 matches during that season. He also played a part in his team's Middle Rhine Cup campaign, providing an assist in the semi final and the final on route to winning the trophy.

=== Feyenoord ===
On 1 September 2022, Amyn joined the under-21 team of Eredivisie club Feyenoord for three years with an option for an additional year.

=== Eintracht Braunschweig ===
On 18 July 2023, Amyn signed for Eintracht Braunschweig on a two-year contract until June 2025. He made his debut on 17 September, coming on as a substitute against Hertha Berlin. He struggled for gametime as his team battled relegation. He only made nine appearances the entire season, failing to score or assist, as his team narrowly avoided the drop by finishing 15th.

=== Al Wehda ===
On 28 August 2024, Amyn moved to Al Wehda in Saudi Arabia.

=== AEK Larnaca ===
On 29 July 2025, Amyn joined Cypriot club AEK Larnaca on a two-year contract.

== International career ==
Amyn was born in Germany to Kurdish parents from Darbandikhan, Kurdistan Region, Iraq. Therefore, he was eligible to play for Germany or Iraq.

=== Germany U19 ===
Amyn has represented Germany at youth level. In 2020, Qahtan Chathir called up the player to represent Iraq's youth team, inviting him to a training camp in Baghdad during his coincidental visit to his hometown, and on many occasions in 2021, new manager Emad Mohammed sent invitations to the player but he rejected and maintained his desire to represent Germany at youth level.

=== Iraq U20 & U23 ===
On 31 March 2023, Amyn announced his desire to represent Iraq's youth team as they go into the 2023 FIFA U-20 World Cup and the manager Emad Mohammed has asked the Iraqi FA to request FIFA to switch Amyn's international eligibility. He was called up to the preparatory training camp in Cádiz, playing his first match in a friendly against Dominican Republic, winning a penalty then converting that penalty in the 50th minute. He also played against Brazil, winning a penalty shortly before half-time which was converted by Abdul-Razzaq Qasim. During his time at the camp, it was announce that FIFA had agreed to switch his international allegiance officially, thus making him eligible to represent Iraq internationally.

He was called up to the final squad for the 2023 FIFA U-20 World Cup, starting all three games and catching the eye of the world through his consistent performances despite his side's humiliating performance as Iraq crashed out of the group stage without scoring a single goal.

Amyn was called up to take part in the 2024 Summer Olympics.

=== Iraq senior team ===
On 16 November 2023, Amyn made his senior debut for Iraq as a substitute against Indonesia in a FIFA World Cup qualifier, scoring a goal in a 5–1 win. He was called up to the 2023 AFC Asian Cup, and featured in all 4 matches as Iraq were knocked out of the tournament by Jordan in the round of 16.

== Personal life ==
Amyn is the older brother of footballer Arian Amyn. Amyn is of Kurdish descent, both parents being from Darbandikhan.

== Career statistics ==
=== Club ===
As of match played 4 January 2026

Appearances and goals by club, season and competition
| Club | Season | League | | | National cup (Note: Includes DFB-Pokal, King's Cup) | | Continental | | Other | | Total | |
| Club | Season | Division | Apps | Goals | Apps | Goals | Apps | Goals | Apps | Goals | Apps | Goals |
|---|---|---|---|---|---|---|---|---|---|---|---|---|
| Viktoria Köln | 2020–21 | 3. Liga | 3 | 0 | — | | — | | 1 (Note: Appearance(s) in Middle Rhine Cup) | 0 | 4 | 0 |
| Viktoria Köln | 2021–22 | 3. Liga | 31 | 4 | 1 | 0 | — | | 4 | 2 | 36 | 6 |
| Viktoria Köln | 2022–23 | 3. Liga | 1 | 1 | 0 | 0 | — | | 0 | 0 | 1 | 1 |
| Viktoria Köln | Total | | 35 | 5 | 1 | 0 | 0 | 0 | 5 | 2 | 41 | 7 |
| Eintracht Braunschweig | 2023–24 | 2. Bundesliga | 9 | 0 | 0 | 0 | — | | — | | 9 | 0 |
| Al Wehda | 2024–25 | Saudi Pro League | 29 | 4 | 2 | 0 | — | | — | | 31 | 4 |
| AEK Larnaca | 2025–26 | Cypriot First Division | 10 | 1 | 0 | 0 | 2 | 0 | 0 | 0 | 12 | 1 |
| Career total | | | 83 | 10 | 3 | 0 | 2 | 0 | 5 | 2 | 93 | 12 |

=== International ===
As of match played 22 June 2026

Appearances and goals by national team and year
| National team | Year | Apps | Goals |
|---|---|---|---|
| Iraq | 2023 | 2 | 1 |
| Iraq | 2024 | 15 | 1 |
| Iraq | 2025 | 7 | 0 |
| Iraq | 2026 | 4 | 0 |
| Total | | 28 | 2 |

Scores and results list Iraq's goal tally first, score column indicates score after each Amyn goal.

List of international goals scored by Youssef Amyn
| No. | Date | Venue | Opponent | Score | Result | Competition |
|---|---|---|---|---|---|---|
| 1 | 16 November 2023 | Basra International Stadium, Basra, Iraq | Indonesia | 4–1 | 5–1 | 2026 FIFA World Cup qualification |
| 2 | 19 November 2024 | Sultan Qaboos Sports Complex, Muscat, Oman | Oman | 1–0 | 1–0 | 2026 FIFA World Cup qualification |

== Honours ==
Viktoria Köln

- Middle Rhine Cup: 2020–21, 2021–22

AEK Larnaca FC

- Cypriot Super Cup: 2025
