= Burkina Faso national football team results (2020–present) =

This article provides details of international football games played by the Burkina Faso national team from 2020 to present.

== Results ==
Key
Win
Draw
Defeat

=== 2020 ===
9 October 2020 Friendly	Burkina Faso	3–0	DR Congo	El Jadida, Morocco
18:00 UTC+1	B. Traoré 15'; Dabo 62' (pen.); Dayo 86'	Report		Stadium: Stade El Abdi; Referee: Redouane Jiyed (Morocco)

12 October 2020 Friendly	Madagascar	1–2	Burkina Faso	El Jadida, Morocco
18:00 UTC+1	Ilaimaharitra 44' (pen.)	Report	B. Traoré 33'; E. Traoré 66'	Stadium: Stade El Abdi; Referee: Noureddine El Jaafari (Morocco)

12 November 2020 2021 AFCON Q	Burkina Faso	3–1	Malawi	Ouagadougou, Burkina Faso
19:00 UTC+0	Traoré 2', 25'; Dabo 90'	Report	Phiri 81' (pen.)	Stadium: Stade du 4 Août; Referee: Dahane Beida (Mauritania)

16 November 2020 2021 AFCON Q	Malawi	0–0	Burkina Faso	Blantyre, Malawi
15:00 UTC+2		Report		Stadium: Kamuzu Stadium; Referee: Souleiman Ahmed Djamal (Djibouti)

=== 2021 ===
16 January 2021 2020 CHAN	Mali	1–0	Burkina Faso	Yaoundé, Cameroon
20:00 UTC+1	Bagayoko 70'	Report		Stadium: Stade Ahmadou Ahidjo; Attendance: 0 Referee: Mohamed Marouf (Egypt)

20 January 2021 2020 CHAN	Burkina Faso	3–1	Zimbabwe	Yaoundé, Cameroon
20:00 UTC+1	Sosso 14'; Kiendrébéogo 53'; Ouedraogo 67'	Report	Jaure 23'	Stadium: Stade Ahmadou Ahidjo; Referee: Mahmoud Mohamed (Egypt)

24 January 2021 2020 CHAN	Burkina Faso	0–0	Cameroon	Yaoundé, Cameroon
20:00 UTC+1		Report		Stadium: Stade Ahmadou Ahidjo; Referee: Sadok Selmi (Tunisia)

24 March 2021 2021 AFCON Q	Uganda	0–0	Burkina Faso	Entebbe, Uganda
16:00 UTC+3		Report		Stadium: St. Mary's Stadium-Kitende; Referee: Bakary Gassama (Gambia)

29 March 2021 2021 AFCON Q	Burkina Faso	1–0	South Sudan	Ouagadougou, Burkina Faso
16:00 UTC+0	B. Traoré 49'	Report		Stadium: Stade du 4 Août; Referee: George Rogers (Liberia)

5 June 2021 Friendly	Ivory Coast	2–1	Burkina Faso	Abidjan, Ivory Coast
19:00 UTC+0	Sangaré 72'; Diallo 90+7'	Report	L. Traoré 16'	Stadium: Stade Olympique Alassane Ouattara; Referee: Yelebodom Bodjona (Togo)

12 June 2021 Friendly	Morocco	1–0	Burkina Faso	Rabat, Morocco
20:00 UTC+1	Hakimi 51'	Report		Stadium: Prince Moulay Abdellah Stadium; Referee: Abdel Aziz Mohamed Bouh (Mauritania)

2 September 2021 2022 World Cup qualification	Niger	0–2	Burkina Faso	Marrakesh, Morocco
17:00 UTC+1		Report	L. Traoré 76' (pen.); Konaté 79'	Stadium: Marrakesh Stadium; Attendance: 0 Referee: Samuel Uwikunda (Rwanda)

7 September 2021 2022 World Cup qualification	Burkina Faso	1–1	Algeria	Marrakesh, Morocco
20:00 UTC+1	Tapsoba 64'	Report	Feghouli 18'	Stadium: Marrakesh Stadium; Attendance: 0 Referee: Joshua Bondo (Botswana)

8 October 2021 2022 World Cup qualification	Djibouti	0–4	Burkina Faso	Marrakesh, Morocco
20:00 UTC+1		Report	Tapsoba 45+2', 48'; Kaboré 51'; Konaté 60'	Stadium: Marrakesh Stadium; Attendance: 0 Referee: Ali Sabilla (Uganda)

11 October 2021 2022 World Cup qualification	Burkina Faso	2–0	Djibouti	Marrakesh, Morocco
17:00 UTC+1	Dayo 30'; Tapsoba 63'	Report		Stadium: Marrakesh Stadium; Attendance: 0 Referee: Hassen Corneh (Liberia)

12 November 2021 2022 World Cup qualification	Burkina Faso	1–1	Niger	Marrakesh, Morocco
13:00 UTC+1	Dayo 55' (pen.)	Report	Oumarou 34' (pen.)	Stadium: Marrakesh Stadium; Attendance: 0 Referee: Samir Guezzaz (Morocco)

16 November 2021 2022 World Cup qualification	Algeria	2–2	Burkina Faso	Blida, Algeria
20:00 UTC+1	Mahrez 21'; Feghouli 68'	Report	Sanogo 37'; Dayo 84' (pen.)	Stadium: Mustapha Tchaker Stadium; Attendance: 17,000; Referee: Victor Gomes (South Africa)

30 December 2021 Friendly	Mauritania	0–0	Burkina Faso	Abu Dhabi, United Arab Emirates
17:00 UTC+4		Report		Stadium: Sultan bin Zayed Al Nahyan Stadium; Referee: Yahya Ali Al Mulla (United Arab Emirates)

=== 2022 ===
2 January 2022 Friendly	Burkina Faso	3–0	Gabon	Dubai, United Arab Emirates
19:00 UTC+4		Report		Stadium: The Sevens Stadium

9 January 2022 2021 AFCON GS	Cameroon	2–1	Burkina Faso	Yaoundé, Cameroon
17:00 UTC+1	Aboubakar 40' (pen.), 45+3' (pen.)	Report	Sangaré 24'	Stadium: Olembe Stadium; Referee: Mustapha Ghorbal (Algeria)

13 January 2022 2021 AFCON GS	Cape Verde	0–1	Burkina Faso	Yaoundé, Cameroon
20:00 UTC+1		Report	Bandé 39'	Stadium: Olembe Stadium; Referee: Amin Omar (Egypt)

17 January 2022 2021 AFCON GS	Burkina Faso	1–1	Ethiopia	Bafoussam, Cameroon
17:00 UTC+1	Bayala 25'	Report	Kebede 52' (pen.)	Stadium: Kouekong Stadium; Referee: Ahmad Imtehaz Heeralall (Mauritius)

23 January 2022 2021 AFCON R16	Burkina Faso	1–1 (a.e.t.) (7–6 p)	Gabon	Limbe, Cameroon
17:00 UTC+1	B. Traoré 28'	Report	Guira 90+1' (o.g.)	Stadium: Limbe Stadium; Referee: Rédouane Jiyed (Morocco)
	Penalties
	Kaboré (penalty scored); S. Ouattara (penalty scored); E. Tapsoba (penalty scored); Simporé (penalty missed); Yago (penalty scored); Guira (penalty scored); Konaté (penalty scored); A. Tapsoba (penalty missed); I. Ouédraogo (penalty scored)		(penalty scored) Bouanga; (penalty scored) Méyé; (penalty scored) Boupendza; (penalty missed) Kanga; (penalty scored) Biyogo Poko; (penalty scored) Ecuele Manga; (penalty scored) Ameka; (penalty missed) N'Gakoutou; (penalty missed) Palun

29 January 2022 2021 AFCON QF	Burkina Faso	1–0	Tunisia	Garoua, Cameroon
20:00 UTC+1	D. Ouattara 45+3'	Report		Stadium: Roumdé Adjia Stadium; Referee: Joshua Bondo (Botswana)

2 February 2022 2021 AFCON SF	Burkina Faso	1–3	Senegal	Yaoundé, Cameroon (Note: The match was originally due to be held at Japoma Stadium in Douala, but was relocated.)
20:00 UTC+1	Touré 82'	Report	Diallo 70'; Gueye 76'; Mané 87'	Stadium: Ahmadou Ahidjo Stadium; Referee: Bamlak Tessema Weyesa (Ethiopia)

5 February 2022 2021 AFCON 3rd	Burkina Faso	3–3 (3–5 p)	Cameroon	Yaoundé, Cameroon
20:00 UTC+1 (Note: The match was originally due to be held on 6 February 2022 at 17:00, but was rescheduled due to security and convenience reasons.)	Yago 24'; Onana 43' (o.g.); O. Ouattara 49'	Report	Bahoken 71'; Aboubakar 85', 87'	Stadium: Ahmadou Ahidjo Stadium; Referee: Rédouane Jiyed (Morocco)
	Penalties
	Kaboré (penalty scored); S. Ouattara (penalty scored); Touré (penalty missed); Yago (penalty scored)		(penalty scored) Aboubakar; (penalty scored) Ngamaleu; (penalty scored) Toko Ekambi; (penalty scored) Kunde; (penalty scored) Oyongo

24 March 2022 Friendly	Kosovo	5–0	Burkina Faso	Pristina, Kosovo
18:00 UTC+1	Aliti 3'; Selmani 23'; Vojvoda 53'; Rashica 68'; Domgjoni 75'	Report		Stadium: Fadil Vokrri Stadium; Referee: Eldorjan Hamiti (Albania)

29 March 2022 Friendly	Belgium	3–0	Burkina Faso	Anderlecht, Belgium
20:45 UTC+2	Vanaken 16'; Trossard 45'; Benteke 75'	Report		Stadium: Constant Vanden Stock Stadium; Referee: Dennis Higler (Netherlands)

3 June 2022 2023 AFCON Q	Burkina Faso	2–0	Cape Verde	Marrakesh, Morocco
20:00 UTC+1	Bandé 58'; Ouattara 88'	Report		Stadium: Marrakesh Stadium; Referee: Daniel Nii Laryea (Ghana)

7 June 2022 2023 AFCON Q	Eswatini	1–3	Burkina Faso	Johannesburg, South Africa
15:00 UTC+2	Ndzinisa 64'	Report	D. Ouattara 69', 75'; Aziz Ki 85'	Stadium: FNB Stadium; Referee: Easter Zimba (Malawi)

23 September 2022 Friendly	DR Congo	0–1	Burkina Faso	Casablanca, Morocco
17:00 UTC+1		Report	B. Traoré 59'	Stadium: Stade Père Jégo; Referee: Samir Guezzaz (Morocco)

27 September 2022 Friendly	Burkina Faso	2–1	Comoros	Casablanca, Morocco
20:00 UTC+1		Report		Stadium: Stade Père Jégo

19 November 2022 Friendly	Ivory Coast	1–2	Burkina Faso	Marrakesh, Morocco
16:00 UTC+0	Sangaré 20'	Report	Ouattara 11'; Tapsoba 42' (pen.)	Stadium: Marrakesh Stadium; Referee: Bouchra Karboubi (Morocco)

=== 2023 ===
24 March 2023 2023 AFCON Q	Burkina Faso	1–0	Togo	Marrakesh, Morocco
19:00 UTC+0	A. Tapsoba 87'	Report		Stadium: Marrakesh Stadium; Referee: Maguette Ndiaye (Senegal)

28 March 2023 2023 AFCON Q	Togo	1–1	Burkina Faso	Lomé, Togo
19:00 UTC+0	Laba 26'	Report	D. Ouattara 12'	Stadium: Stade de Kégué; Referee: Bakary Gassama (Gambia)

18 June 2023 AFCON qualification	Cape Verde	3–1	Burkina Faso	Praia, Cape Verde
15:00 UTC−1	Bebé 7'; Fernandes 67'; Clé 90+4'	Report	Dayo 45+3'	Stadium: Estádio Nacional de Cabo Verde; Referee: Haythem Guirat (Tunisia)

8 September 2023 AFCON qualification	Burkina Faso	0–0	Eswatini	Marrakesh, Morocco
20:00 UTC+1		Report		Stadium: Stade de Marrakesh; Referee: Amin Omar (Egypt)

12 September Friendly	Morocco	1–0	Burkina Faso	Lens, France
19:30 UTC+1	Ounahi 36'	Report		Stadium: Stade Bollaert-Delelis; Referee: Jérémie Pignard (France)

13 October Friendly	Equatorial Guinea	0–0	Burkina Faso	Malabo, Equatorial Guinea
		Report		Stadium: Estadio de Malabo

17 November 2026 FIFA World Cup Qualification	Burkina Faso	1–1	Guinea-Bissau	Marrakesh, Morocco
20:00 UTC+1	Traoré 61'	Report	Baldé 20'	Stadium: Marrakesh Stadium; Attendance: 120; Referee: Alhadi Allaou Mahamat (Chad)

21 November 2026 FIFA World Cup Qualification	Ethiopia	0–3	Burkina Faso	El Jadida, Morocco
20:00 UTC+1		Report	Touré 69'; Traoré 78' (pen.); Ouattara 90'	Stadium: Stade El Abdi; Attendance: 385; Referee: Lamin Jammeh (Gambia)

=== 2024 ===
5 January Friendly	Iran	2–1	Burkina Faso	Kish, Iran
18:00 UTC+3:30	Taremi 42'; Ebrahimi 77'	Report	M. Konaté 17'	Stadium: Olympic Stadium; Referee: Yousif Saeed Hasan (Iraq)

10 January Friendly	DR Congo	1–2	Burkina Faso	Dubai, United Arab Emirates
17:00 UTC+4	Mbemba 57'	Report	Touré 36'; Konaté 41'	Stadium: Baniyas Stadium; Attendance: 0

16 January 2023 AFCON GS	Burkina Faso	1–0	Mauritania	Bouaké, Ivory Coast
14:00 UTC+0	Traoré 90+6' (pen.)	Report		Stadium: Stade de la Paix; Attendance: 27,898; Referee: Jalal Jiyed (Morocco)

20 January 2023 AFCON GS	Algeria	2–2	Burkina Faso	Bouaké, Ivory Coast
14:00 UTC+0	Bounedjah 51', 90+5'	Report	Konaté 45+3'; Traoré 71' (pen.)	Stadium: Stade de la Paix; Attendance: 33,501; Referee: Abongile Tom (South Africa)

23 January 2023 AFCON GS	Angola	2–0	Burkina Faso	Yamoussoukro, Ivory Coast
20:00 UTC+0	Mabululu 36'; Zini 90+2'	Report		Stadium: Charles Konan Banny Stadium; Attendance: 15,753; Referee: Jean-Jacques Ndala Ngambo (DR Congo)

30 January 2023 AFCON R16	Mali	2–1	Burkina Faso	Korhogo, Ivory Coast
17:00 UTC+0	E. Tapsoba 3' (o.g.); Sinayoko 47'	Report	Traoré 57' (pen.)	Stadium: Amadou Gon Coulibaly Stadium; Attendance: 19,184; Referee: Ibrahim Mutaz (Libya)

22 March Friendly	Libya	2–1	Burkina Faso	Casablanca, Morocco
22:00 UTC+1				Stadium: Père Jégo Stadium

26 March Friendly	Niger	1–1	Burkina Faso

6 June 2026 World Cup qualification	Egypt	2–1	Burkina Faso	Cairo, Egypt
22:00 UTC+3	Trézéguet 3', 8'	Report	L. Traoré 57'	Stadium: Cairo International Stadium; Attendance: 65,000; Referee: Peter Waweru (Kenya)

10 June 2026 World Cup qualification	Burkina Faso	2–2	Sierra Leone	Bamako, Mali
16:00 UTC+0	Ouattara 41'; L. Traoré 45+2' (pen.)	Report	Kargbo 58'; Bakayoko 88'	Stadium: Stade du 26 Mars; Referee: Lahlou Benbraham (Algeria)

6 September 2025 AFCON qualification	Senegal	1–1	Burkina Faso	Dakar, Senegal
19:00 UTC+0	Mané 16'	Report	Bouda 90+5'	Stadium: Diamniadio Olympic Stadium; Referee: Sedok Selmi (Tunisia)

10 September 2025 AFCON qualification	Burkina Faso	3–1	Malawi	Bamako, Mali
19:00 UTC+0	L. Traoré 35', 38'; Bandé 60' (pen.)	Report	Z. Nkhoma 80'	Stadium: Stade du 26 Mars; Referee: Bouchra Karbouni (Morocco)

10 October 2025 AFCON qualification	Burkina Faso	4–1	Burundi	Abidjan, Ivory Coast
19:00 UTC+0	D. Ouattara 33', 44'; Bansé 34'; Dayo 49'	Report	Kanakimana 4'	Stadium: Alassane Ouattara Stadium; Referee: Abdulrazg Ahmed (Libya)

13 October 2025 AFCON qualification	Burundi	0–2	Burkina Faso	Abidjan, Ivory Coast
16:00 UTC+0		Report	Konaté 5'; B. Traoré 90+4' (pen.)	Stadium: Felix Houphouet Boigny Stadium; Referee: Mohamed Athoumani (Comoros)

14 November 2025 AFCON qualification	Burkina Faso	0–1	Senegal	Bamako, Mali
18:00 UTC+0		Report	Diarra 83'	Stadium: Stade du 26 Mars; Referee: Mahmoud El Banna (Egypt)

18 November 2025 AFCON qualification	Malawi	3–0	Burkina Faso	Lilongwe, Malawi
14:00 UTC+2	Mhango 28'; Mbulu 57'; Aaron 62'	Report		Stadium: Bingu National Stadium; Referee: Mohamed Diraneh Guedi (Djibouti)

=== 2025 ===
21 March 2026 World Cup qualification	Burkina Faso	4–1	Djibouti	El Jadida, Morocco
17:00 UTC+1	Tiendrebeogo 12'; B. Traoré 33'; Zougrana 47'; L. Traoré 67'	Report	Akinbinu 88' (pen.)	Stadium: Ben M'Hamed El Abdi Stadium; Referee: Abdel Mohamed Bouh (Mauritania)

24 March 2026 World Cup qualification	Guinea-Bissau	1–2	Burkina Faso	Bissau, Guinea-Bissau
16:00 UTC+0	Banjaqui 36'	Report	Traoré 6', 73'	Stadium: Estádio 24 de Setembro

2 June Friendly	Tunisia	2–0	Burkina Faso	Tunis, Tunisia
18:30 UTC+1	Tapsoba 60' (o.g.); Hazem 90+1'			Stadium: Hammadi Agrebi Stadium; Referee: Lahlou Benbraham (Algeria)

5 September 2026 World Cup qualification	Djibouti	0–6	Burkina Faso	Bissau, Guinea-Bissau
	Siad Isman (red card) 10'		Irié 16'; Tiendrébéogo 25'; Tapsoba 36', 42'; Ouattara 59', 86' (pen.)	Stadium: Estádio 24 de Setembro; Referee: Tawel Camara (Guinea)

9 September 2026 World Cup qualification	Burkina Faso	0–0	Egypt	Ouagadougou, Burkina Faso
				Stadium: Stade du 4 Août; Referee: Messie Nkounkou (Congo)

8 October 2026 World Cup qualification	Sierra Leone	0–1	Burkina Faso	Paynesville, Liberia
			Zougrana 42'	Stadium: Samuel Kanyon Doe Sports Complex; Referee: Jean-Jacques Ndala (DR Congo)

12 October 2026 World Cup qualification	Burkina Faso	3–1	Ethiopia	Ouagadougou, Burkina Faso
	Kabore 65', 82', 90+6'		Ayten 84'	Stadium: Stade du 4 Août; Referee: Adalbert Diouf (Senegal)

14 November Friendly	Burkina Faso	3–2	Niger	Mohammedia, Morocco
	Kabore 34', 45+3', 57'	Report	Badamassi 24'; Sosah 55'	Stadium: El Bachir Stadium

18 November Friendly	Burkina Faso	3–0	Benin	Mohammedia, Morocco
17:00 UTC+1	Minoungou 25', 45+3'; Simpore 90+4'	Report		Stadium: El Bachir Stadium

24 December 2025 AFCON GS	Burkina Faso	2–1	Equatorial Guinea	Casablanca, Morocco
13:30 UTC+1	Minoungou 90+5'; Tapsoba 90+8'	Report	Ndong (red card) 50'; Anieboh 85'	Stadium: Mohammed V Stadium; Attendance: 10,267; Referee: Mohamed Maarouf (Egypt)

28 December 2025 AFCON GS	Algeria	1–0	Burkina Faso	Rabat, Morocco
18:30 UTC+1	Mahrez 23' (pen.)	Report		Stadium: Moulay Hassan Stadium; Attendance: 18,522; Referee: Daniel Nii Laryea (Ghana)

31 December 2025 AFCON GS	Sudan	0–2	Burkina Faso	Casablanca, Morocco
17:00 UTC+1		Report	L. Traoré 16'; Kouassi 85'	Stadium: Mohammed V Stadium; Attendance: 10,084; Referee: Amin Mohamed Omar (Egypt)

=== 2026 ===
6 January 2025 AFCON R16	Ivory Coast	3–0	Burkina Faso	Marrakesh, Morocco
20:00 UTC+1	Amad 20'; Y. Diomande 32'; Touré 87'	Report		Stadium: Marrakesh Stadium; Referee: Mahmood Ismail (Sudan)

28 March Friendly	Burkina Faso	5–0	Guinea-Bissau	Ouagadougou, Burkina Faso
19:00 UTC+1	P. Kaboré 26'; Ouattara 40'; E. Kaboré 61', 73', 88'	Report		Stadium: Stade du 4 Août; Referee: Moussa Ahamadou Alou (Niger)

31 March Friendly	Burkina Faso	1–1	Guinea-Bissau	Ouagadougou, Burkina Faso
18:00 UTC+0	Nagalo 85'		F. Gomes 90+6'	Stadium: Stade du 4 Août; Referee: Moussa Ahmadou Alou (Niger)

5 June Friendly	Russia	3–0	Burkina Faso	Volgograd, Russia
20:00 UTC+3	Sadulayev 15'; Al. Miranchuk 20'; Vakhaniya 73'	Report		Stadium: Volgograd Arena; Attendance: 41,035; Referee: Nenad Minaković (Serbia)

9 June Friendly	Belarus	2–2	Burkina Faso	Minsk, Belarus
19:30 UTC+3	Malkevich 56'; Vardanyan 67'	Report	Kaboré 72'; Tapsoba 85'	Stadium: National Football Stadium; Attendance: 15,874; Referee: Rafael Shafeev (Russia)

TBD 2027 AFCON qualification	Burkina Faso	v	Benin	TBD, Burkina Faso
TBD				Stadium: TBD

TBD 2027 AFCON qualification	Benin	v	Burkina Faso	TBD, Benin
TBD				Stadium: TBD

TBD 2027 AFCON qualification	Burkina Faso	v	Mauritania	TBD, Burkina Faso
TBD				Stadium: TBD

TBD 2027 AFCON qualification	Mauritania	v	Burkina Faso	TBD, Mauritania
TBD				Stadium: TBD

TBD 2027 AFCON qualification	Burkina Faso	v	Central African Republic	TBD, Burkina Faso
TBD				Stadium: TBD

TBD 2027 AFCON qualification	Central African Republic	v	Burkina Faso	TBD, Central African Republic
TBD				Stadium: TBD
