= 2025 Africa Cup of Nations Group E =

Football tournament group stage

Group E of the 2025 Africa Cup of Nations took place from 24 to 31 December 2025. The group consisted of Algeria, Burkina Faso, Equatorial Guinea, and Sudan.

Algeria and Burkina Faso as the top two teams, along with Sudan as one of the four best third-placed teams, advanced to the round of 16.

== Teams ==
Draw position	Team	Zone	Method of qualification	Date of qualification	Finals appearance	Last appearance	Previous best performance	FIFA Rankings	
Draw position	Team	Zone	Method of qualification	Date of qualification	Finals appearance	Last appearance	Previous best performance	December 2024 (Note: The rankings of December 2024 were used for seeding for the final draw.)	December 2025
E1	Algeria	UNAF	Group E winners	14 October 2024	21st	2023	Winners (1990, 2019)	37	34
E2	Burkina Faso	WAFU	Group L runners-up	13 October 2024	14th	2023	Runners-up (2013)	66	62
E3	Equatorial Guinea	UNIFFAC	Group E runners-up	13 November 2024	5th	2023	Fourth place (2015)	93	97
E4	Sudan	CECAFA	Group F runners-up	19 November 2024	10th	2021	Winners (1970)	113	117

== Standings ==
Pos	Team	Pld	W	D	L	GF	GA	GD	Pts	Qualification
1	Algeria	3	3	0	0	7	1	+6	9	Advance to knockout stage
2	Burkina Faso	3	2	0	1	4	2	+2	6	Advance to knockout stage
3	Sudan	3	1	0	2	1	5	−4	3	Advance to knockout stage
4	Equatorial Guinea	3	0	0	3	2	6	−4	0	

Source: CAF
Rules for classification: Group stage tiebreakers

== Matches ==
All times are local, CET (UTC+1).

=== Algeria vs Sudan ===
24 December 2025
16:00

Algeria	3–0	Sudan
Mahrez 2', 61'; Maza 85'	Report

Moulay Hassan Stadium, Rabat
Attendance: 16,115
Referee: Pierre Atcho (Gabon)

Algeria	Sudan

GK	23	Luca Zidane
RB	25	Rafik Belghali
CB	2	Aïssa Mandi
CB	21	Ramy Bensebaini
LB	15	Rayan Aït-Nouri	(substituted off) 61'
CM	14	Hicham Boudaoui
CM	10	Ismaël Bennacer	(substituted off) 78'
RW	7	Riyad Mahrez (c)	(substituted off) 78'
AM	17	Farès Chaïbi	(substituted off) 60'
LW	18	Mohamed Amoura	(substituted off) 82'
CF	9	Baghdad Bounedjah
Substitutes:
MF	6	Ramiz Zerrouki	(substituted on) 82'
MF	11	Anis Hadj-Moussa	(substituted on) 78'
DF	13	Jaouen Hadjam	(substituted on) 61'
FW	22	Ibrahim Maza	(substituted on) 60'
MF	27	Adil Boulbina	(substituted on) 78'
Manager:
(Bosnia and Herzegovina) Vladimir Petković

GK	21	Monged Abuzaid
RB	7	Yaser Boshara
CB	3	Ahmed Saeed	(yellow card) 52'
CB	6	Mustafa Karshoum
LB	12	Bakhit Khamis (c)
RM	15	Salah Adel	(yellow card) 14' (yellow-red card) 39'
CM	2	Abuaagla Abdalla		(substituted off) 70'
CM	13	Ammar Taifour
LM	20	Abo Eisa		(substituted off) 68'
AM	8	Abdel Raouf		(substituted off) 66'
CF	14	Mohamed Eisa		(substituted off) 67'
Substitutes:
FW	9	Yaser Muzamel		(substituted on) 68'
FW	10	Mohamed Abdelrahman		(substituted on) 67'
MF	18	Awad Gadin		(substituted on) 70'
FW	22	Al-Jezoli Nouh		(substituted on) 66'
Manager:
(Ghana) James Kwesi Appiah

=== Burkina Faso vs Equatorial Guinea ===
24 December 2025
13:30

Burkina Faso	2–1	Equatorial Guinea
Minoungou 90+5'; Tapsoba 90+8'	Report	Anieboh 85'

Mohammed V Stadium, Casablanca
Attendance: 10,267
Referee: Mohamed Maarouf (Egypt)

Burkina Faso	Equatorial Guinea

GK	16	Hervé Koffi
RB	25	Steeve Yago		(substituted off) 89'
CB	14	Issoufou Dayo
CB	12	Edmond Tapsoba
LB	26	Arsène Kouassi
DM	18	Ismahila Ouédraogo	(yellow card) 32'	(substituted off) 70'
CM	20	Gustavo Sangaré		(substituted off) 70'
CM	22	Blati Touré
RF	10	Bertrand Traoré (c)		(substituted off) 79'
CF	27	Pierre Landry Kaboré		(substituted off) 70'
LF	7	Dango Ouattara
Substitutes:
MF	17	Stephane Aziz Ki		(substituted on) 70'
FW	2	Lassina Traoré		(substituted on) 70'
MF	24	Saïdou Simporé		(substituted on) 70'
FW	19	Georgi Minoungou		(substituted on) 79'
FW	21	Cyriaque Irié		(substituted on) 89'
Manager:
Brama Traoré

GK	1	Jesús Owono
RB	15	Carlos Akapo (c)
CB	21	Esteban Obiang
CB	16	Saúl Coco
LB	11	Basilio Ndong	(red card) 50'
RM	6	Iban Salvador	(yellow card) 67'	(substituted off) 68'
CM	5	Omar Mascarell
CM	22	Pablo Ganet		(substituted off) 82'
LM	19	Luís Asué		(substituted off) 53'
CF	24	Loren Zúñiga		(substituted off) 82'
CF	7	José Machín		(substituted off) 67'
Substitutes:
DF	12	Charles Ondo		(substituted on) 53'
MF	8	Jannick Buyla		(substituted on) 67'
MF	20	Santiago Eneme		(substituted on) 68'
DF	3	Marvin Anieboh		(substituted on) 82'
FW	9	Dorian Jr.		(substituted on) 82'
Manager:
Juan Michá

=== Algeria vs Burkina Faso ===
28 December 2025
18:30

Algeria	1–0	Burkina Faso
Mahrez 23' (pen.)	Report

Moulay Hassan Stadium, Rabat
Attendance: 18,522
Referee: Daniel Nii Laryea (Ghana)

Algeria	Burkina Faso

GK	23	Luca Zidane
RB	26	Samir Chergui		(substituted off) 60'
CB	2	Aïssa Mandi
CB	21	Ramy Bensebaini
LB	13	Jaouen Hadjam		(substituted off) 13'
CM	14	Hicham Boudaoui
CM	10	Ismaël Bennacer	(yellow card) 27'	(substituted off) 87'
RW	7	Riyad Mahrez (c)		(substituted off) 61'
AM	22	Ibrahim Maza
LW	15	Rayan Aït-Nouri
CF	18	Mohamed Amoura	(yellow card) 73'	(substituted off) 88'
Substitutes:
FW	6	Baghdad Bounedjah		(substituted on) 13'
DF	25	Rafik Belghali		(substituted on) 60'
DF	5	Zineddine Belaïd		(substituted on) 61'
MF	8	Himad Abdelli		(substituted on) 87'
MF	17	Farès Chaïbi		(substituted on) 88'
Manager:
(Bosnia and Herzegovina) Vladimir Petković

GK	16	Hervé Koffi
RB	25	Steeve Yago		(substituted off) 78'
CB	14	Issoufou Dayo
CB	12	Edmond Tapsoba	(yellow card) 89'
LB	26	Arsène Kouassi
DM	18	Ismahila Ouédraogo
CM	20	Gustavo Sangaré	(yellow card) 10'	(substituted off) 78'
CM	6	Mohamed Zougrana		(substituted off) 46'
RF	10	Bertrand Traoré (c)
CF	27	Pierre Landry Kaboré	(yellow card) 16'	(substituted off) 66'
LF	7	Dango Ouattara
Substitutes:
FW	19	Georgi Minoungou		(substituted on) 46'
FW	2	Lassina Traoré		(substituted on) 66'
FW	21	Cyriaque Irié		(substituted on) 78'
MF	24	Saïdou Simporé		(substituted on) 78'
Manager:
Brama Traoré

=== Equatorial Guinea vs Sudan ===
28 December 2025
16:00

Equatorial Guinea	0–1	Sudan
	Report	Coco 74' (o.g.)

Mohammed V Stadium, Casablanca
Attendance: 8,671
Referee: Messie Nkounkou (Congo)

Equatorial Guinea	Sudan

GK	1	Jesús Owono
RB	15	Carlos Akapo (c)	(yellow card) 87'
CB	21	Esteban Obiang
CB	16	Saúl Coco
LB	3	Marvin Anieboh
DM	5	Omar Mascarell
RM	6	Iban Salvador		(substituted off) 46'
CM	14	Pedro Obiang		(substituted off) 69'
CM	7	José Machín	(yellow card) 45+3'	(substituted off) 70'
LM	20	Santiago Eneme		(substituted off) 25'
CF	24	Loren Zúñiga		(substituted off) 77'
Substitutes:
FW	17	Josete Miranda	(yellow card) 90+6'	(substituted on) 25'
FW	26	José Nabil Ondo		(substituted on) 46'
MF	22	Pablo Ganet		(substituted on) 69'
FW	19	Luís Asué		(substituted on) 70'
FW	10	Emilio Nsue		(substituted on) 77'
Manager:
Juan Michá

GK	21	Monged Abuzaid	(yellow card) 72'
RB	25	Sheddy Barglan	(yellow card) 41'	(substituted off) 87'
CB	3	Ahmed Saeed
CB	6	Mustafa Karshoum
LB	12	Bakhit Khamis (c)
CM	5	Walieldin Khedr	(yellow card) 16'
CM	13	Ammar Taifour
RW	26	Aamir Abdallah		(substituted off) 72'
AM	8	Abdel Raouf		(substituted off) 72'
LW	10	Mohamed Abdelrahman		(substituted off) 80'
CF	14	Mohamed Eisa
Substitutes:
FW	11	John Mano		(substituted on) 72'
FW	9	Yaser Muzmel		(substituted on) 72'
DF	4	Altayeb Abdelrazeg		(substituted on) 80'
DF	18	Awad Zayed		(substituted on) 87'
Manager:
(Ghana) James Kwesi Appiah

=== Equatorial Guinea vs Algeria ===
31 December 2025
17:00

Equatorial Guinea	1–3	Algeria
Nsue 50'	Report	Belaïd 19'; Chaïbi 25'; Maza 32'

Moulay Hassan Stadium, Rabat
Attendance: 15,187
Referee: Pacifique Ndabihawenimana (Burundi)

Equatorial Guinea	Algeria

GK	1	Jesús Owono
RB	3	Marvin Anieboh
CB	21	Esteban Obiang
CB	16	Saúl Coco		(substituted off) 84'
LB	12	Charles Ondo		(substituted off) 71'
DM	5	Omar Mascarell		(substituted off) 46'
RM	8	Jannick Buyla		(substituted off) 71'
CM	4	Álex Balboa
CM	22	Pablo Ganet	(yellow card) 83'
LM	26	José Nabil Ondo		(substituted off) 46'
CF	10	Emilio Nsue (c)
Substitutes:
MF	7	José Machín		(substituted on) 46'
MF	6	Iban Salvador	(yellow card) 54'	(substituted on) 46'
MF	27	Gael Joel Akogo	(yellow card) 83'	(substituted on) 71'
DF	18	Michael Ngaah		(substituted on) 71'
DF	2	Néstor Senra		(substituted on) 84'
Manager:
Juan Michá

GK	1	Anthony Mandrea
RB	25	Rafik Belghali		(substituted off) 46'
CB	5	Zineddine Belaïd
CB	4	Mohamed Amine Tougai		(substituted off) 60'
LB	15	Rayan Aït-Nouri		(substituted off) 46'
CM	6	Ramiz Zerrouki (c)
CM	8	Himad Abdelli
RW	11	Anis Hadj Moussa	(yellow card) 87'
AM	22	Ibrahim Maza		(substituted off) 61'
LW	17	Farès Chaïbi		(substituted off) 79'
CF	12	Monsef Bakrar
Substitutes:
DF	3	Mehdi Dorval		(substituted on) 46'
DF	20	Youcef Atal		(substituted on) 46'
DF	2	Aïssa Mandi		(substituted on) 60'
MF	19	Adem Zorgane		(substituted on) 61'
MF	24	Ilan Kebbal		(substituted on) 79'
Manager:
(Bosnia and Herzegovina) Vladimir Petković

=== Sudan vs Burkina Faso ===
31 December 2025
17:00

Sudan	0–2	Burkina Faso
	Report	L. Traoré 16'; Kouassi 85'

Mohammed V Stadium, Casablanca
Attendance: 10,084
Referee: Amin Mohamed Omar (Egypt)

Sudan	Burkina Faso

GK	16	Muhamed Alnour Abouja
RB	18	Awad Zayed
CB	24	Muhamed Kesra	(substituted off) 81'
CB	4	Altayeb Abdelrazeg
LB	17	Mazin Mohamedein
CM	15	Salah Adel	(substituted off) 90'
CM	7	Yaser Awad
RW	9	Yaser Muzmel (c)	(substituted off) 60'
AM	26	Aamir Abdallah
LW	22	Al-Jezoli Nouh	(substituted off) 81'
CF	11	John Mano
Substitutes:
FW	27	Muhamed Tia Asad	(substituted on) 60'
MF	23	Abdelsamad Manen	(substituted on) 81'
DF	6	Mustafa Karshoum	(substituted on) 81'
MF	2	Abuaagla Abdalla	(substituted on) 90'
Manager:
(Ghana) James Kwesi Appiah

GK	16	Hervé Koffi		(substituted off) 46'
RB	8	Cedric Badolo	(yellow card) 35'
CB	14	Issoufou Dayo (c)		(substituted off) 59'
CB	12	Edmond Tapsoba
LB	26	Arsène Kouassi
CM	24	Saïdou Simporé
CM	22	Blati Touré
RW	21	Cyriaque Irié		(substituted off) 59'
AM	17	Stephane Aziz Ki		(substituted off) 74'
LW	19	Georgi Minoungou
CF	2	Lassina Traoré		(substituted off) 74'
Substitutes:
GK	23	Kilian Nikiema		(substituted on) 46'
FW	7	Dango Ouattara		(substituted on) 59'
DF	4	Adamo Nagalo		(substituted on) 59'
FW	27	Pierre Landry Kaboré		(substituted on) 74'
MF	6	Mohamed Zougrana	(yellow card) 88'	(substituted on) 74'
Manager:
Brama Traoré
