= Ibrahim Maza =

Algeria international footballer (born 2005)

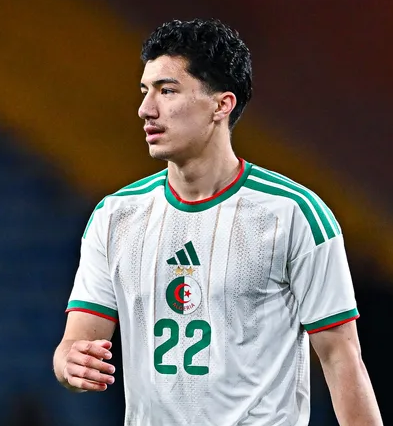
- Maza with Algeria in 2026

Personal information
- Date of birth: 24 November 2005 (age 20)
- Place of birth: Berlin, Germany
- Height: 1.80 m (5 ft 11 in)
- Position: Attacking midfielder

Team information
- Current team: Bayer Leverkusen
- Number: 30

Youth career
- 2011–2018: Reinickendorfer Füchse
- 2018–2023: Hertha BSC

Senior career*
Years	Team	Apps	(Gls)
2022–2024	Hertha BSC II	9	(2)
2023–2025	Hertha BSC	51	(9)
2025–	Bayer Leverkusen	36	(6)

International career^{‡}
2022–2023	Germany U18	8	(3)
2024	Germany U19	3	(1)
2024	Germany U20	2	(0)
2024–	Algeria	24	(3)
- * Club domestic league appearances and goals as of 31 October 2026 ‡ National team caps and goals as of 6 October 2026

Ibrahim Maza (Arabic: إبراهيم مازة, romanized: Ibrāhīm Māza; born 24 November 2005) is a professional footballer who plays as an attacking midfielder for Bundesliga club Bayer Leverkusen. Born in Germany, he plays for the Algeria national team.

The product of Hertha BSC's academy, Maza debuted professionally with Hertha in 2023, spending two years in second tier of German football, before moving to Bayer Leverkusen in 2025.

Maza represented Germany at youth level, before changing to represent Algeria. He represented them at 2025 Africa Cup of Nations and the 2026 FIFA World Cup.

== Club career ==
Maza is a youth product of Reinickendorfer Füchse, before moving to the youth academy of Hertha BSC in 2018. He started his senior career with the Hertha reserves in 2022. On 27 April 2023, he signed his first professional contract with Hertha until 2026. He made his professional debut with Hertha BSC as a substitute in a 2–0 Bundesliga loss to Bayern Munich on 30 April 2023. With Hertha having already been relegated the previous week, Maza came on as a substitute and scored his first senior goal, equalising in a 2–1 away win against VfL Wolfsburg on 27 May 2023.

On 1 May 2025, it was announced that Maza would join Bundesliga side Bayer Leverkusen at the end of the season. He was transferred for a reported fee of €12 million, and he signed a contract until 2030. As the year progressed, he scored his first goals for the club on 8 November by netting a brace in a 6–0 win over Heidenheim. Later that month, on 25 November, he provided his first assist in the UEFA Champions League in a 2–0 away win over Manchester City.

== International career ==
Born in Germany, Maza is of Algerian and Vietnamese descent. He holds Algerian and German passports. He is a former youth international, having played for Germany at the U18, U19, and U20 level.

In October 2024, Maza was called up to the Algeria national football team for the first time for a pair of 2025 Africa Cup of Nations qualifiers against Togo. He made his debut in the 89th minute of the match. He was included in the squad for the 2026 FIFA World Cup and made his World Cup debut in the first group stage match against Argentina. He started the match as a midfielder and played for 82 minutes. Maza is nicknamed "Mazadona" within Algeria, named after Maradona.

== Personal life ==
Maza was born in Germany and is of Algerian-Kabyle and Vietnamese descent. His father, Sofiane, immigrated to Germany from Algiers, and met his mother. He reportedly vacationed in Algeria over several summers with his family and has an older sister named Rahma Maza.

== Career statistics ==
=== Club ===
As of match played 31 October 2026

Appearances and goals by club, season and competition
Club	Season	League			DFB-Pokal		Europe		Total	
Club	Season	Division	Apps	Goals	Apps	Goals	Apps	Goals	Apps	Goals
Hertha BSC II	2022–23	Regionalliga Nordost	7	2	—		—		7	2
Hertha BSC II	2023–24	Regionalliga Nordost	2	0	—		—		2	0
Hertha BSC II	Total		9	2	—		—		9	2
Hertha BSC	2022–23	Bundesliga	2	1	0	0	—		2	1
Hertha BSC	2023–24	2. Bundesliga	13	1	0	0	—		13	1
Hertha BSC	2024–25	2. Bundesliga	33	5	3	2	—		36	7
Hertha BSC	Total		48	7	3	2	—		51	9
Bayer Leverkusen	2025–26	Bundesliga	28	3	4	2	12 (Note: Appearances in UEFA Champions League)	0	44	5
Bayer Leverkusen	2026–27	Bundesliga	8	3	2	0	2 (Note: Appearances in UEFA Europa League)	1	12	4
Bayer Leverkusen	Total		36	6	6	2	14	1	56	9
Career total			93	15	9	4	14	1	116	20

=== International ===
As of match played 6 October 2026

Appearances and goals by national team and year
National team	Year	Apps	Goals
Algeria	2024	1	0
Algeria	2025	10	2
Algeria	2026	13	1
Total		24	3

As of match played 25 September 2026
Algeria score listed first, score column indicates score after each Maza goal.

List of international goals scored by Ibrahim Maza
No.	Date	Venue	Cap	Opponent	Score	Result	Competition
1	24 December 2025	Moulay El Hassan Stadium, Rabat, Morocco	9	Sudan	3–0	3–0	2025 Africa Cup of Nations
2	31 December 2025	Moulay El Hassan Stadium, Rabat, Morocco	11	Equatorial Guinea	3–0	3–1	2025 Africa Cup of Nations
3	25 September 2026	Hocine Aït Ahmed Stadium, Tizi Ouzou, Algeria	22	Zambia	2–1	3–1	2027 Africa Cup of Nations qualification
