= Jesús Mansogo =

Equatoguinean footballer (born 2001)

Personal information
- Full name: Jesús Mansogo Nguema Obono
- Birth name: Jesús Mansogo Mitogo Obono
- Date of birth: 16 August 2001 (age 25)
- Place of birth: Evinayong, Equatorial Guinea
- Height: 1.88 m (6 ft 2 in)
- Position: Attacking midfielder

Team information
- Current team: CJ Ben Guerir

Senior career*
Years	Team	Apps	(Gls)
–2019	Estrella Roja		
2019–2022	Cano Sport		
2022–2023	Union de Tataouine	5	(0)
2023	TAS Casablanca		
2024–2025	Hilal Nador		
2025–	CJ Ben Guerir		

International career^{‡}
2019–	Equatorial Guinea	5	(0)
- * Club domestic league appearances and goals as of 3 June 2023 ‡ National team caps and goals as of 27 September 2022

Jesús Mansogo Nguema Obono (born 16 August 2001) is an Equatoguinean professional footballer who plays as an attacking midfielder for Botola Pro D2 club CJ Ben Guerir and the Equatorial Guinea national team.

== Club career ==
Mansogo has played for Deportivo Ebenezer (without license), Estrella Roja and Cano Sport in Equatorial Guinea.

== International career ==
Mansogo made his international debut for Equatorial Guinea on 28 July 2019.
