= Iano Simão =

Bissau-Guinean footballer

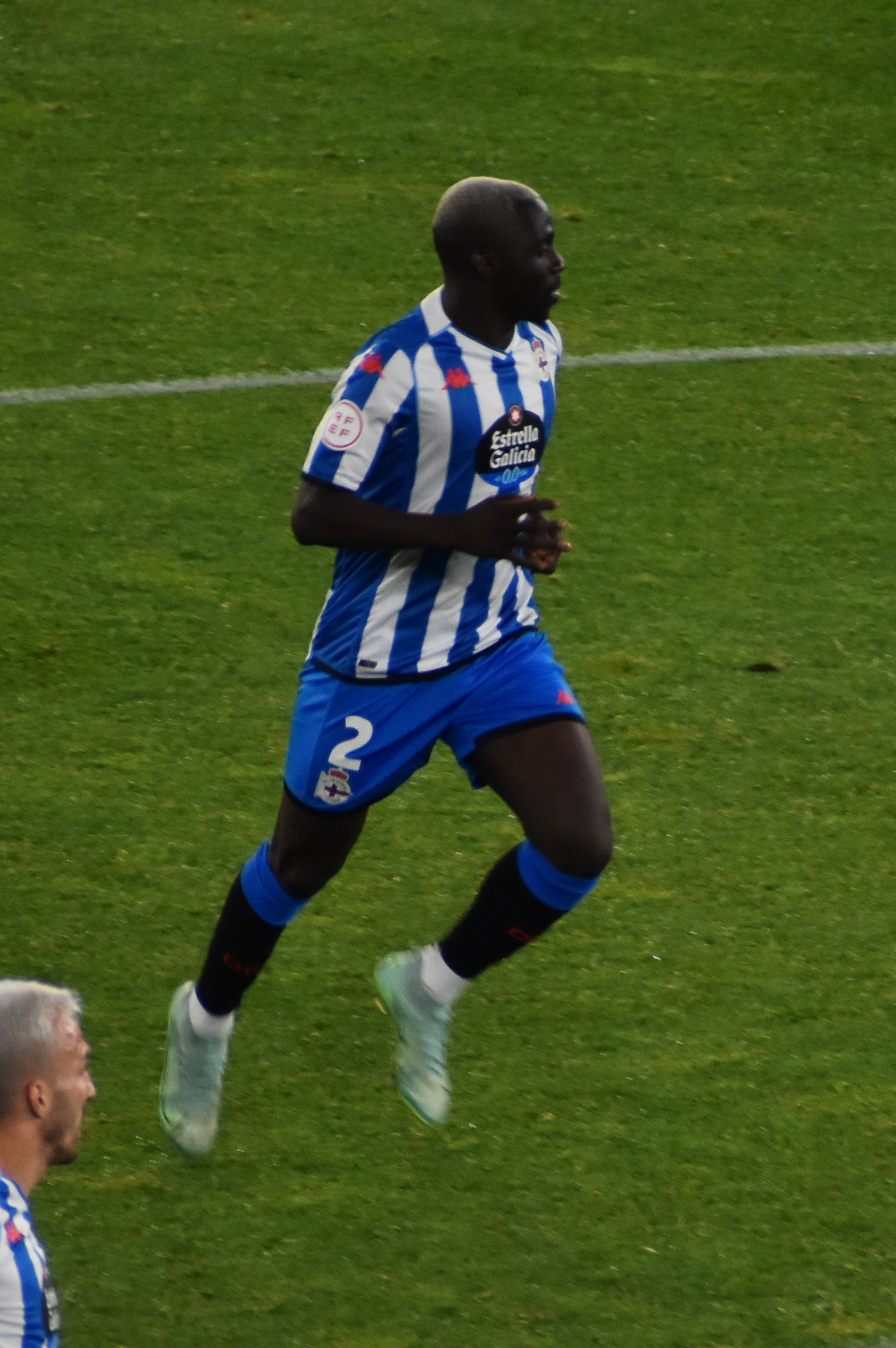
- Imbeni playing for Deportivo La Coruña in 2024

Personal information
- Full name: Iano Simão da Silva Imbeni
- Date of birth: 2 February 1999 (age 27)
- Place of birth: Bissau, Guinea-Bissau
- Height: 1.79 m (5 ft 10 in)
- Position: Left-back

Team information
- Current team: Penafiel
- Number: 2

Senior career*
Years	Team	Apps	(Gls)
2017–2018	Benfica de Bissau	2	(0)
2018–2019	Limianos	27	(4)
2019–2020	Montalegre	20	(7)
2020–2021	Choco	28	(4)
2021–2024	Deportivo B	70	(9)
2024–2025	Deportivo La Coruña	5	(0)
2024–2025	→ Arenteiro (loan)	33	(0)
2025–	Penafiel	25	(1)

International career^{‡}
2021–	Guinea-Bissau	3	(1)
- * Club domestic league appearances and goals as of 20 June 2026 ‡ National team caps and goals as of 8 September 2025

Iano Simão da Silva Imbeni (born 2 February 1999) is a Bissau-Guinean football player who plays for Portuguese club Penafiel. Mainly a left-back, he can also play as a winger.

== International career ==
He made his debut for Guinea-Bissau national football team on 15 November 2021 in a World Cup qualifier against Sudan.

As of match played 8 September 2025

Appearances and goals by national team and year
National team	Year	Apps	Goals
Guinea-Bissau	2021	1	0
Guinea-Bissau	2025	2	1
Total		3	1

Scores and results list Guines-Bissau's goal tally first, score column indicates score after each Imbeni goal.

List of international goals scored by Iano Imbeni
No.	Date	Venue	Opponent	Score	Result	Competition
1	8 September 2025	Estádio 24 de Setembro, Bissau, Guinea-Bissau	Djibouti	1–0	2–0	2026 FIFA World Cup qualification
