= Bakhit Khamis =

Sudanese footballer (born 1992)

Personal information
- Full name: Bakhit Khamis Muhamed Nemira
- Date of birth: 16 January 1992 (age 34)
- Place of birth: Ad-Damazin, Sudan
- Height: 1.74 m (5 ft 9 in)
- Position: Left-back

Team information
- Current team: Al-Wefaq SC (Ajdabiya)
- Number: 12

Senior career*
Years	Team	Apps	(Gls)
2007–2009	Al-Zahra Al-Damazin		
2009–2013	Al-Ahly Wad Madani		
2013	Al Rabita Kosti		
2013–2017	Al Merrikh		
2017–2020	Al-Merreikh Al-Fasher		
2020–2024	Al Merrikh		
2023–2024	→Al Nasr Benghazi (loan)		
2024–2026	Al Ahli Tripoli		
2026-	Al-Wefaq SC (Ajdabiya)		

International career^{‡}
2016–	Sudan	37	(0)
- * Club domestic league appearances and goals as of 21:05, 16 February 2026 (UTC) ‡ National team caps and goals as of 23:55, 3 January 2026 (UTC)

Bakhit Khamis Muhamed Nemira (Arabic: بخيت خميس; born 16 January 1992) is a Sudanese professional footballer who plays as a left-back for the Sudan national team.

== Club career ==
Khamis began his senior career in Sudan with Al-Zahra Al-Damazin, before moving to Al-Ahly Wad Madani. In 2013, he moved to Al Merrikh where he won 2 Sudan Cups and the Sudan Premier League. In 2017 he moved to Al-Merreikh Al-Fasher, before returning to Al Merrikh in 2020. In 2023 he joined the Libyan club Al Nasr Benghazi on a year-long loan, and helped them win the 2023–24 Libyan Premier League. The following season he moved to Al Ahli Tripoli where he again won the Libyan Premier League.

== International career ==
Khamis was called up to the Sudan national team for the 2025 FIFA Arab Cup. The following month, he was called up to the 2025 Africa Cup of Nations where he was named captain.

== Honours ==
Al Merrikh

- Sudan Cup: 2014, 2015
- Sudan Premier League: 2015

Al Nasr Benghazi

- Libyan Premier League: 2023–24

Al Ahli Tripoli

- Libyan Premier League: 2024–25
