= Basilio Ndong =

Equatoguinean footballer (born 1999)

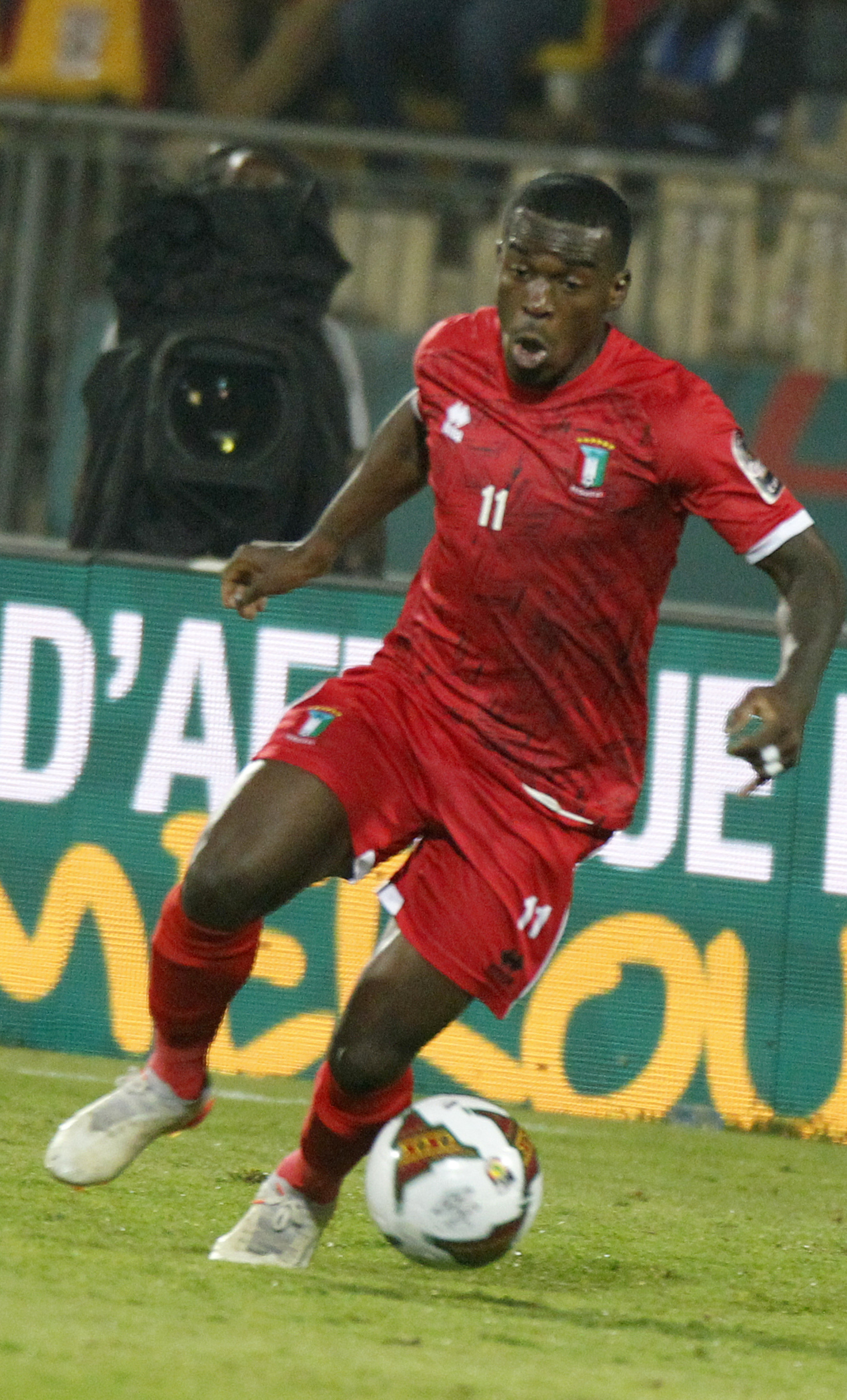
- Ndong in 2022

Personal information
- Full name: Basilio Ndong Owono Nchama
- Date of birth: 17 January 1999 (age 27)
- Place of birth: Mbini, Equatorial Guinea
- Height: 1.73 m (5 ft 8 in)
- Positions: Left back; left winger

Team information
- Current team: Tirana
- Number: 3

Youth career
- 2015–2017: Cano Sport

Senior career*
Years	Team	Apps	(Gls)
2018–2020	Shkupi	44	(0)
2020–2022	Westerlo	4	(0)
2021	→ Start (loan)	8	(0)
2022–2023	Start	26	(1)
2023–2025	Universitatea Craiova	40	(0)
2025–	Tirana	28	(3)

International career^{‡}
2016–	Equatorial Guinea	58	(0)
- * Club domestic league appearances and goals as of 09:55, 16 August 2025 (UTC) ‡ National team caps and goals as of 9 June 2025

Basilio Ndong Owono Nchama (born 17 January 1999) is an Equatoguinean professional footballer who plays for Kategoria Superiore club Tirana and the Equatorial Guinea national team. Mainly a left back, he can also operate as a left winger.

== Club career ==
Ndong is a Cano Sport Academy product. He began playing for them at Cadete (under-16) level as a left back and then in its Juvenil (under-19) side. He was transitioning to more offensive positions, always on the left side.

On 30 January 2018, just a week after concluding his participation with Equatorial Guinea at the 2018 African Nations Championship, he signed a three-and-a-half-year contract with Macedonian club FK Shkupi.

In September 2021, he moved to Norwegian club Start, on loan from Westerlo. In November 2021, he joined Start permanently, signing a contract until summer 2024.

After a period as a free agent following his exit from Universitatea Craiova, Ndong signed with Albanian club KF Tirana in late November 2025 on a contract running until November 2027, beginning the next stage of his career in the Kategoria Superiore.

== International career ==
He made his debut for the Equatorial Guinea national team on 4 September 2016 in a match against South Sudan. The game, which ended in a decisive 4–0 victory, was part of the qualification campaign for the 2017 Africa Cup of Nations.

At the beginning of 2018, he took part in the African Nations Championship held in Morocco. He played three matches during the tournament, all of which ended in defeat.

In early 2022, he was selected by coach Juan Micha to participate in the 2021 Africa Cup of Nations held in Cameroon. During the competition, he was a regular starter and played every match for his team. Equatorial Guinea was eliminated in the quarter-finals by Senegal.

In December 2023, he was included in the list of twenty-seven Equatorial Guinean players selected to compete in the 2023 Africa Cup of Nations.

== Career statistics ==
=== Club ===
As of match played 10 August 2025

Appearances and goals by club, season and competition
Club	Season	League			National cup (Note: Includes Belgian Cup, Norwegian Cup, Cupa României)		Continental		Other		Total	
Club	Season	Division	Apps	Goals	Apps	Goals	Apps	Goals	Apps	Goals	Apps	Goals
Shkupi	2017–18	Macedonian First Football League	11	0	—		—		—		11	0
Shkupi	2018–19	Macedonian First Football League	24	0	0	0	2 (Note: Appearances in UEFA Europa League)	0	—		26	0
Shkupi	2019–20	Macedonian First Football League	9	0	1	0	—		—		10	0
Shkupi	Total		44	0	1	0	2	0	—		47	0
Westerlo	2020–21	Belgian First Division B	4	0	1	0	—		—		5	0
Start (loan)	2021	Norwegian First Division	8	0	2	0	—		—		10	0
Start	2022	Norwegian First Division	26	1	1	0	—		—		27	1
Start	Total		34	1	3	0	—		—		37	1
Universitatea Craiova	2022–23	Liga I	15	0	—		—		—		15	0
Universitatea Craiova	2023–24	Liga I	12	0	3	0	—		1 (Note: Appearance in Liga I play-offs for UEFA Conference League)	0	16	0
Universitatea Craiova	2024–25	Liga I	12	0	2	0	1 (Note: Appearance in UEFA Conference League)	0	—		15	0
Universitatea Craiova	2025–26	Liga I	1	0	0	0	1	0	—		2	0
Universitatea Craiova	Total		40	0	5	0	2	0	1	0	48	0
Career total			122	1	10	0	4	0	1	0	137	1

=== International ===
As of match played 9 June 2025

Appearances and goals by national team and year
National team	Year	Apps	Goals
Equatorial Guinea	2016	2	0
Equatorial Guinea	2017	2	0
Equatorial Guinea	2018	6	0
Equatorial Guinea	2019	5	0
Equatorial Guinea	2020	2	0
Equatorial Guinea	2021	6	0
Equatorial Guinea	2022	11	0
Equatorial Guinea	2023	7	0
Equatorial Guinea	2024	13	0
Equatorial Guinea	2025	4	0
Total		58	0

== Honours ==
Universitatea Craiova

- Liga I: 2025–26
