= Casto Nopo =

Equatoguinean football manager

Personal information
- Full name: Casto Nopo Abeso Evuna Ada
- Date of birth: 23 February 1973 (age 53)
- Place of birth: Malabo, Equatorial Guinea

Team information
- Current team: Equatorial Guinea (assistant coach)

Senior career*
Years	Team	Apps	(Gls)
- Akonangui FC
- US Bitam

International career
- Equatorial Guinea

Managerial career
- 2002–200x: Akonangui FC
- 2006–2014: The Panthers F.C.
- 2010: Equatorial Guinea (caretaker)
- 2011: Equatorial Guinea (caretaker)
- –2017: Leones Vegetarianos
- 2017: Equatorial Guinea (caretaker)
- 201?–2019: Cano Sport
- 2019: Equatorial Guinea (caretaker)
- 2020: Equatorial Guinea (caretaker)
- 2021–: Equatorial Guinea (assistant coach)
- * Club domestic league appearances and goals

Casto Nopo Abeso Evuna Ada (born 23 February 1973) is an Equatorial Guinean professional football manager and former player. He currently coaches both Liga Nacional club Cano Sport Academy and is the assistant coach of the senior Equatorial Guinea national team, for which he has played during his playing career.

== Career ==
In 2010, Nopo became the new caretaker coach of the Equatorial Guinea national football team.

In 2011, Nopo again became the caretaker coach of the national football team.

Until January 2014, Nopo coached The Panthers F.C. He previously coached the Akonangui FC

== Achievements ==
Winners - Equatoguinean Cup: 2002, 2012, 2013
