= Equatorial Guinea national football team =

Men's football team

Equatorial Guinea
- Nickname(s): Nzalang Nacional (National Thunder); Diablos Rojos (Red Devils)
- Association: Federación Ecuatoguineana de Fútbol (FEGUIFUT)
- Confederation: CAF (Africa)
- Sub-confederation: UNIFFAC (Central Africa)
- Head coach: Vincenzo Alberto Annese
- Captain: Pablo Ganet
- Most caps: Pablo Ganet (65)
- Top scorer: Emilio Nsue (25)
- Home stadium: Estadio de Malabo
- FIFA code: EQG
First colours	Second colours	Third colours

FIFA ranking
- Current: 103 ▲2 (7 October 2026)
- Highest: 49 (February 2015)
- Lowest: 195 (December 1998)

First international
- China 6–2 Equatorial Guinea (China, 23 May 1975)

Biggest win
- Equatorial Guinea 4–0 Central African Republic (Bata, Equatorial Guinea; 1 December 2014); Equatorial Guinea 4–0 South Sudan (Malabo, Equatorial Guinea; 4 September 2016); Equatorial Guinea 4–0 Ivory Coast (Abidjan, Ivory Coast; 22 January 2024)

Biggest defeat
- Congo 6–0 Equatorial Guinea (Congo, 13 December 1990)

Africa Cup of Nations
- Appearances: 5 (first in 2012)
- Best result: Fourth place (2015)

African Nations Championship
- Appearances: 1 (first in 2018)
- Best result: Group stage (2018)

COSAFA Cup
- Appearances: 0
- Best result: Withdrew (2015)

The Equatorial Guinea national football team (Spanish: Selección de fútbol de Guinea Ecuatorial) represents Equatorial Guinea in men's international football and is controlled by the Equatoguinean Football Federation, a member of the Confederation of African Football (CAF).

The team has never qualified for the FIFA World Cup, but has qualified for the Africa Cup of Nations on five occasions, the first two times as hosts (in 2012 and 2015). They finished in fourth place in 2015, and reached the quarter-finals in 2012 and 2021.

== History ==
Equatorial Guinea played its first match on 23 May 1975 against China in a friendly, losing 6–2. They did not play another international game until the 1985 UDEAC Cup in December 1985. They were drawn in a group against the hosts Congo and Central African Republic. They lost 5–0 to the Congo on 9 December and then earned their first draw (1–1) against the Central African Republic on 14 December. On 16 December, they played a play-off for fifth place against Chad, and lost 3–2 on penalties after a 1–1 draw.

Equatorial Guinea would come in fourth in the 1987 UDEAC Cup, losing on penalties in the third-place match to Gabon, even though they only scored one goal throughout the tournament, in a 1–1 draw against Chad. They also drew 0–0 against Cameroon. On their next attempt, they got sixth place after losing on penalties against the Central African Republic. The next time Equatorial Guinea played the Central African Republic, in 1999, they tasted their first ever win, 4–2.

In the late 2000s, the FEGUIFUT, along with the Gabonese Federation, announced a bid to host the 2012 Africa Cup of Nations, against other African nations' bids, including Angola, Libya and Nigeria. Equatorial Guinea and Gabon won the right to host the games, and two new stadiums were built in Equatorial Guinea: Estadio de Bata in Bata and Estadio de Malabo in Malabo.

The opening game of the 2012 African Cup of Nations was also Equatorial Guinea's first participation in a major international tournament, and resulted in a historic 1–0 win over Libya on 21 January 2012. An 87th-minute strike from former Real Madrid winger Javier Balboa earned the victory. In the next game, they secured the qualification for the quarter-finals by beating Senegal 2–1, and finished second in their group after losing 0–1 to Zambia. They progressed to the quarter-finals where they were eliminated by the tournament's runners-up Ivory Coast, losing 3–0 with goals from Didier Drogba and Yaya Touré. Various national side players were praised due to their performances in the tournament, including Javier Balboa, Randy, Ben Konaté and Rui, the latter a part of the Team of the Tournament.

Three years after that Africa Cup of Nations, Equatorial Guinea organized solely the 2015 edition, but this time, to replace Morocco, the original host. In the opener, they drew 1–1 against Congo, with Emilio Nsue scoring first. In the second game, they managed to play out a 0–0 draw with Burkina Faso, the runners-up of the previous edition. With these two results, the Nzalang Nacional had to win against its classic rival Gabon in the third match in order to qualify for the quarter-finals. Equatorial Guinea won 2–0 with goals from Javier Balboa (a penalty kick) and Ibán. As Group A's runner-up, the Equatoguinean national team then defeated Tunisia 2–1 with two goals from Balboa, the first being a penalty kick in the final moments of the regular time, and the second was in extra time. In the semi-final, however, they lost 0–3 to Ghana, and in the match for third place, drew 0–0 against DR Congo, ultimately losing 2–4 on penalties. The country finished the tournament in fourth place, being its best international participation to date and helping it reach a historical 49th position in the FIFA rankings.

=== 2021 Africa Cup of Nations ===
Equatorial Guinea failed to qualify for 2017 and 2019 editions of the African Cup of Nations. Likewise, the team had also didn't qualify for the 2018 FIFA World Cup. During the 2021 Africa Cup of Nations qualification, they were grouped in group J along with powerhouse Tunisia, 2019 AFCON participant Tanzania and North African bedfellow Libya. The Nzalang Nacional performed poorly in their first two games, losing both with one goal margin to Tanzania away and Tunisia at home, and it appeared that Equatorial Guinea would just end up failing as usual as the team had never qualified throughout regular qualification outside hosting the competition twice.

However, the COVID-19 pandemic led all AFCON qualification suspended until late 2020, when it resumed as Equatorial Guinea faced up against a rising spirit Libyan side that aimed to qualify for the first time since 2012. Despite this, Equatorial Guinea produced an outstanding comeback against Libya in Egypt, beating Libya 3–2 with two late goals by Pedro Obiang and Salomón Obama from being led 1–2 until injury times. The Nzalang Nacional later hosted the same opponent at home, and like their game in Cairo, the Equatorial Guineans won again, 1–0, by virtual goal from Iban Salvador. After beating Tanzania 1–0 on home soil, Equatorial Guinea managed a historic feat, a regular qualification for the first time ever in its history.

During AFCON 2021, the National Thunder were drawn in group E, alongside Ivory Coast, Sierra Leone and Algeria. Equatorial Guinea lost their opening match against Ivory Coast, but produced one of the tournament's surprised when they defeated trophy holders Algeria in their second match. In their final match of the group, they defeated Sierra Leone and qualified for the round of 16, coming in second in the group, after Ivory Coast.

In the round of 16, Equatorial Guinea was drawn against Mali, the winners of group F. The game ended in a goalless draw after 120 minutes and went to deciding penalties, where the Nzalang Nacional won the shoot-out 6–5 thanks to the heroics of goalkeeper Jesús Owono, who saved two of the shots. This meant that the national team qualified for the quarter finals of AFCON for the third time in their history and the first one advancing from the round of 16. They subsequently lost to eventual champions Senegal, 3–1.

== Eligibility of players controversy ==
In recent years, Equatorial Guinea has courted controversy by recruiting foreign players and giving them citizenship despite having little or no ties to the country. In 2009, South African journalist and FIFA archivist Mark Gleeson wrote that it was undermining the integrity of African football.

In late 2005, and at the request of Ruslán Obiang Nsue, a son of President Teodoro Obiang, Brazilian coach Antônio Dumas recruited several Brazilian players to represent the Equatorial Guinea but the CAF and FIFA turned a blind eye, despite complaints from other nations.

In 2012, having lost the first leg of a 2013 Africa Cup of Nations qualification round 4–0 to the Democratic Republic of the Congo, Equatorial Guinea recruited nine Brazilian players to help overturn the deficit for the second leg. The team did manage to win the match 2–1, but it was not enough to overturn the aggregate and Equatorial Guinea were eliminated. DR Congo head coach Claude Le Roy complained that the Equatorial Guinea were acting like the "United Nations of football".

Before the arrival of new coach Andoni Goikoetxea to Malabo, in March 2013, the Equatoguinean board made the squad for the 2014 FIFA World Cup qualifying match against Cape Verde and again called-up nine Brazilian players. In May 2013, they joined Colombian-born, Equatorian-based Jimmy Bermúdez, who was going to be paid €3,000 for each match he played.

During the 2015 qualifiers, in the games played against Mauritania, the Nzalang Nacional lost 1–0 away and won 3–0 in Malabo, qualifying to the next round to face Uganda. However, the Mauritanian Football Federation submitted a complaint to CAF about the inclusion of ineligible players by Equatorial Guinea (some with fake passports and false names), resulting in the expulsion of the Equatorial Guinean team, based on the particular situation of Thierry Fidjeu, while the cases of the other players remained under investigation. However, they were reinstated after Morocco withdrew from hosting due to Ebola outbreak.

Emilio Nsue, who played for Spanish youth national teams from 2005 to 2011, played two matches of Equatorial Guinea in 2013. A few months later, FIFA declared him ineligible for that match and for the return fixture, awarding both games to Cape Verde by a 3–0 scoreline. Nsue did not gain Equatoguinean nationality until after playing official matches for Spain and the Equatoguinean Football Federation did not ask FIFA for permission to switch allegiances. Nsue continued to play for Equatorial Guinea despite FIFA declaring his ineligibility, including the 2015, 2021, and 2023 editions of the African Cup of Nations. In June 2024, FIFA judges ruled that Nsue was never eligible to play for Equatorial Guinea throughout his entire career. He had allegedly use a fraudulent Equatoguinean passport in which it is stated that he was born in Malabo, instead of Palma de Mallorca. In 2025, he was admitted to change nations.

== Home stadium ==
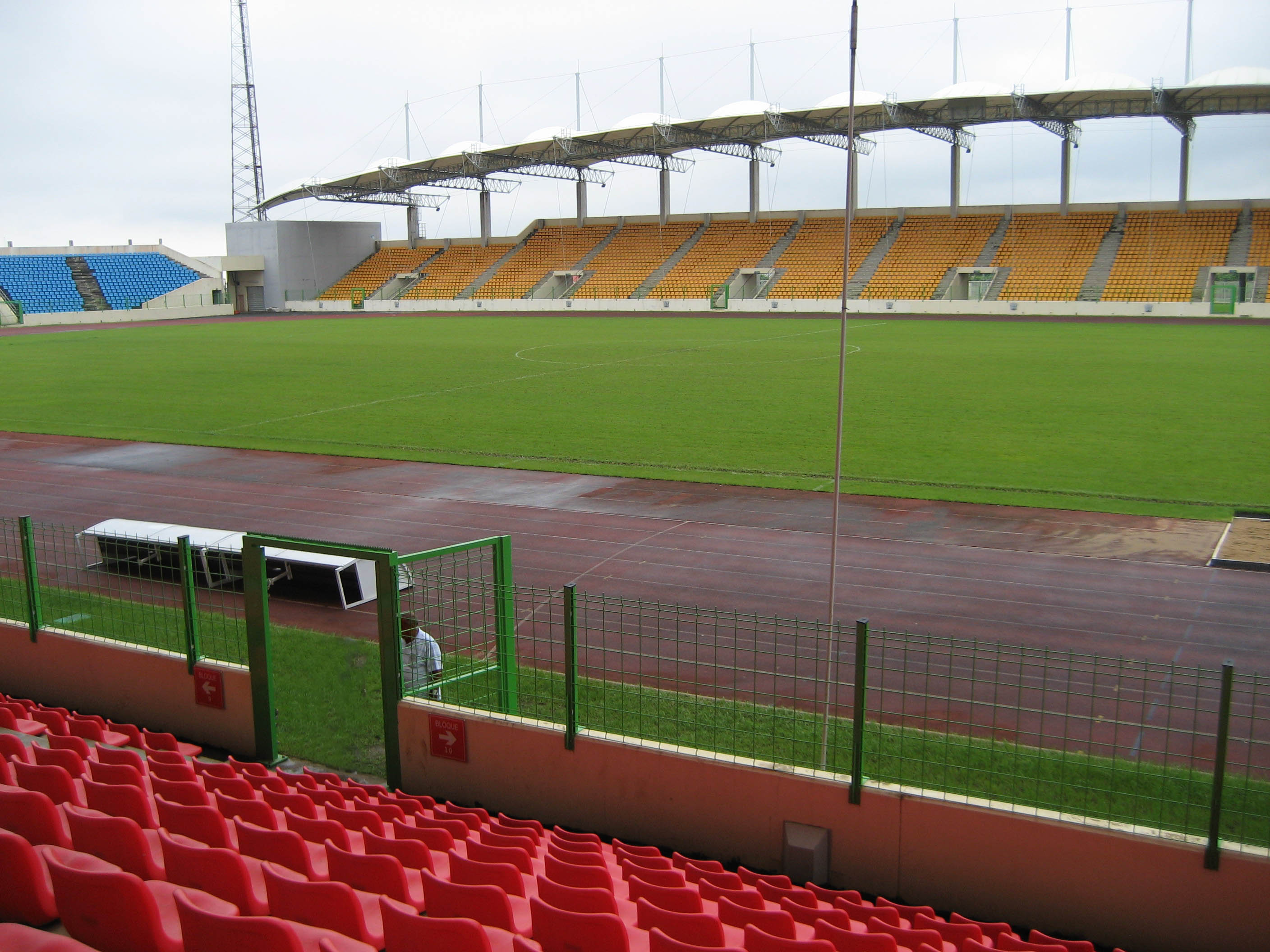
Estadio de Malabo

Equatorial Guinea's home stadium is Estadio de Malabo in the same name city. It can hold up to 15,250 people. Equatorial Guinea played there when they hosted the Afcon 2012 and they played against eventual winners Zambia and runners-up, the Ivory Coast. They also played in the newly constructed Estadio de Bata, where they won both their games against Libya and Senegal.

== Kit and colours ==
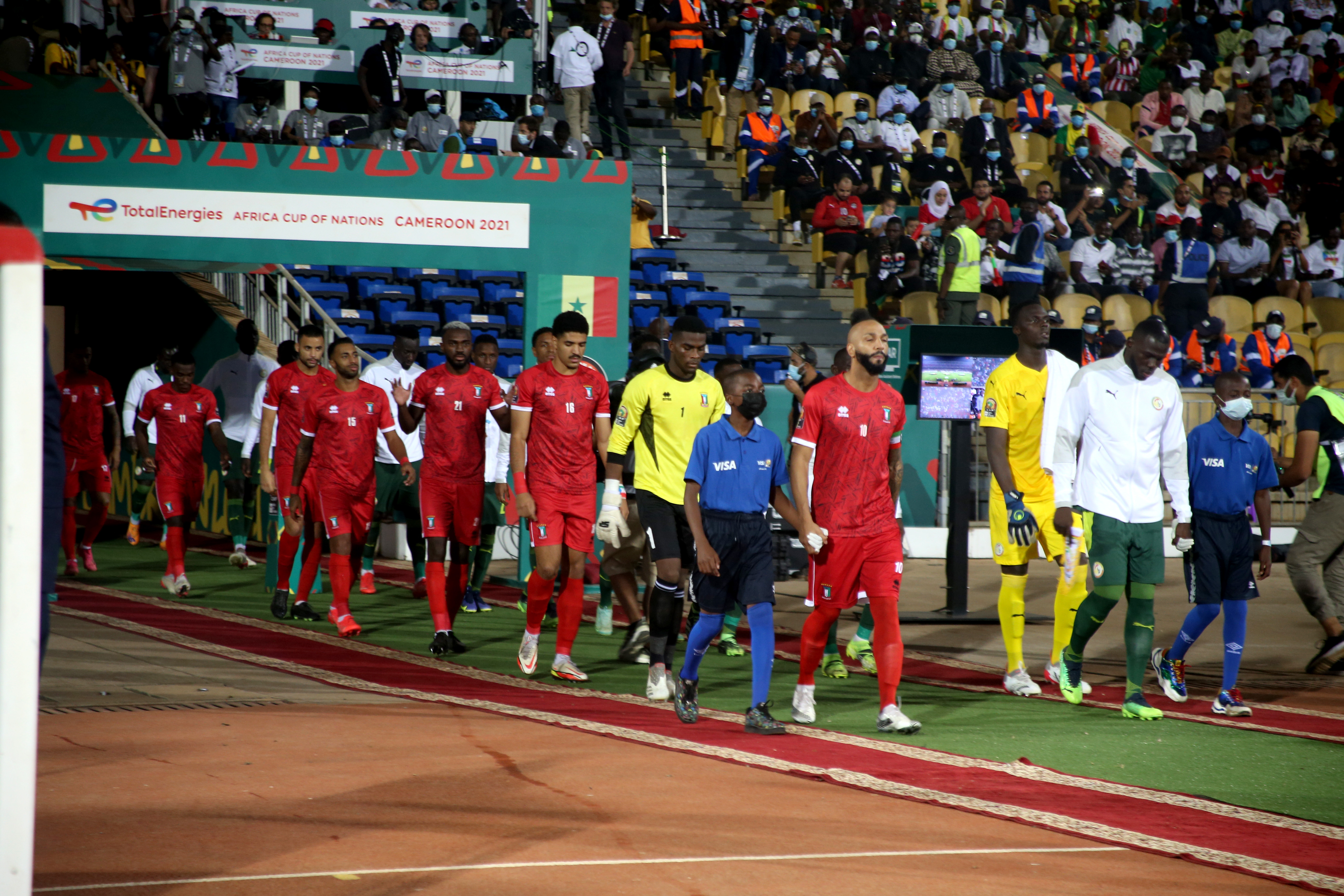
The national football team of Equatorial Guinea

Equatorial Guinea wears a red and white uniform. The kit manufacturer is Erreà. When they play in Equatorial Guinea, they wear a solid red jersey and matching shorts with white stripes. The number, FEGUIFUT logo, and Erreà logo are located on the chest. The socks are red with white at the top. When Equatorial Guinea is away, they wear all white shirt with blue stripes.

== Rivalries ==
=== Tunisia ===
The rivalry with Tunisia is unique over the fact that these meetings are more recent and used to be regarded as unimportant, but the root fuelling this rivalry occurred during the quarter-finals of the 2015 Africa Cup of Nations, in which the Tunisians got a string of unfair decisions from the referee, which caused the team to lose to the Equatorial Guinean hosts 2–1, fuelled widespread rage and anger among Tunisian players and fans. Ever since, Tunisia and Equatorial Guinea have found themselves surprisingly in confrontation of numerous recent tournament qualifications, started with the 2021 Africa Cup of Nations qualification where Tunisia won both fixtures, albeit by one goal margin. However, despite Tunisia's domination, Equatorial Guinea have proven to be increasingly stern in later qualifications, having managed to defeat Tunisia at home in the 2022 FIFA World Cup qualification and the 2023 Africa Cup of Nations qualification. Both national teams are again scheduled to face each other at the 2026 FIFA World Cup qualification.

=== Gabon ===
Equatorial Guinea's classic rival is its neighbor Gabon. Equatoguinean (formerly disputed) territories of Mbañe, Cocoteros and Conga are a main cause in this rivalry. Their first recognized match was on 18 December 1987 and it ended in a 4–3 win for Gabon via penalty shoot-out after a goalless draw. After five loses over the next 15 years, Equatorial Guinea would earn its first win on 8 June 2003, a 2–1 at home, during the 2004 Africa Cup of Nations qualification. This result is among the most celebrated Equatorial Guinea matches ever by local fans. They also had a notable 2–0 victory over Gabon at the 2015 Africa Cup of Nations, which allowed them to pass the group stage, eliminating Gabon in the process.

== Results and fixtures ==
The following is a list of match results in the last 12 months, as well as any future matches that have been scheduled.

Win Draw Loss Fixture

=== 2025 ===
14 November Friendly	Kenya	0–1	Equatorial Guinea	Antalya, Turkey
18:00 UTC+3		Report		Stadium: Arslan Zeki Demirci Sports Complex; Referee: Kadir Saglam (Turkey)

17 November Friendly	Madagascar	2–0	Equatorial Guinea	Manavgat, Turkey
17:00 UTC+3		Report		Stadium: Arslan Zeki Demirci Sports Complex

24 December 2025 AFCON GS	Burkina Faso	2–1	Equatorial Guinea	Casablanca, Morocco
13:30 UTC+1	Minoungou 90+5'; Tapsoba 90+8'	Report	Ndong (red card) 50'; Anieboh 85'	Stadium: Mohammed V Stadium; Referee: Mohamed Maarouf (Egypt)

28 December 2025 AFCON GS	Equatorial Guinea	0–1	Sudan	Casablanca, Morocco
16:00 UTC+1		Report	Coco 74' (o.g.)	Stadium: Mohammed V Stadium; Attendance: 8,671; Referee: Messie Nkounkou (Congo)

31 December 2025 AFCON GS	Equatorial Guinea	1–3	Algeria	Rabat, Morocco
17:00 UTC+1	Nsue 50'	Report	Belaïd 19'; Chaïbi 25'; Maza 32'	Stadium: Moulay Hassan Stadium; Referee: Pacifique Ndabihawenimana (Burundi)

=== 2026 ===
25 March Friendly	Kyrgyzstan	0–1	Equatorial Guinea	Antalya, Türkiye
17:00 UTC+3		Report	Josete 40' (pen.)	Stadium: Emirhan Sport Complex; Referee: Cihan Aydın (Turkey)

31 March Friendly	Equatorial Guinea	1–1	Madagascar	Antalya, Türkiye
13:00 UTC+3	L. Zúñiga 45+3'	Report	Raveloson 62'	Stadium: Emirhan Sport Complex; Referee: Kadir Sağlam (Turkey)

4 June Friendly	Equatorial Guinea	Cancelled	Burundi	Marrakesh, Morocco

9 June Friendly	Equatorial Guinea	0–1	Comoros	Marrakesh, Morocco
10:30 UTC+1			Youssouf 90+1'

24 September 2027 AFCON qualification	DR Congo	2–0	Equatorial Guinea	Kinshasa, DR Congo
17:00 UTC+1	Mbemba 4'; Wissa 72'			Stadium: Martyrs Stadium; Referee: Joseph Odey Ogabor (Nigeria)

28 September 2027 AFCON qualification	Equatorial Guinea	1–0	Sierra Leone	Yaoundé, Cameroon
17:00 UTC+1	Zúñiga 1'	Report		Stadium: Ahmadou Ahidjo Stadium; Referee: Fabrice Senyo (Togo)

12 November 2027 AFCON qualification	Equatorial Guinea	0–0	Zimbabwe	Bata, Equatorial Guinea
18:00 UTC+1		Report		Stadium: Estadio de Bata; Referee: Ahmed Arajiga (Tanzania)

16 November 2027 AFCON qualification	Zimbabwe	3–0	Equatorial Guinea	Harare, Zimbabwe
15:00 UTC+1	Ngwenya 4'; Chirewa 71'; Maswanhise 78'	Report		Stadium: National Sports Stadium; Referee: Teklu Mogos (Eritrea)

=== 2027 ===
24 March 2027 AFCON qualification	Equatorial Guinea	v	DR Congo	TBD, Equatorial Guinea
TBD				Stadium: TBD

28 March 2027 AFCON qualification	Sierra Leone	v	Equatorial Guinea	TBD, Sierra Leone
TBD				Stadium: TBD

== Coaching staff ==
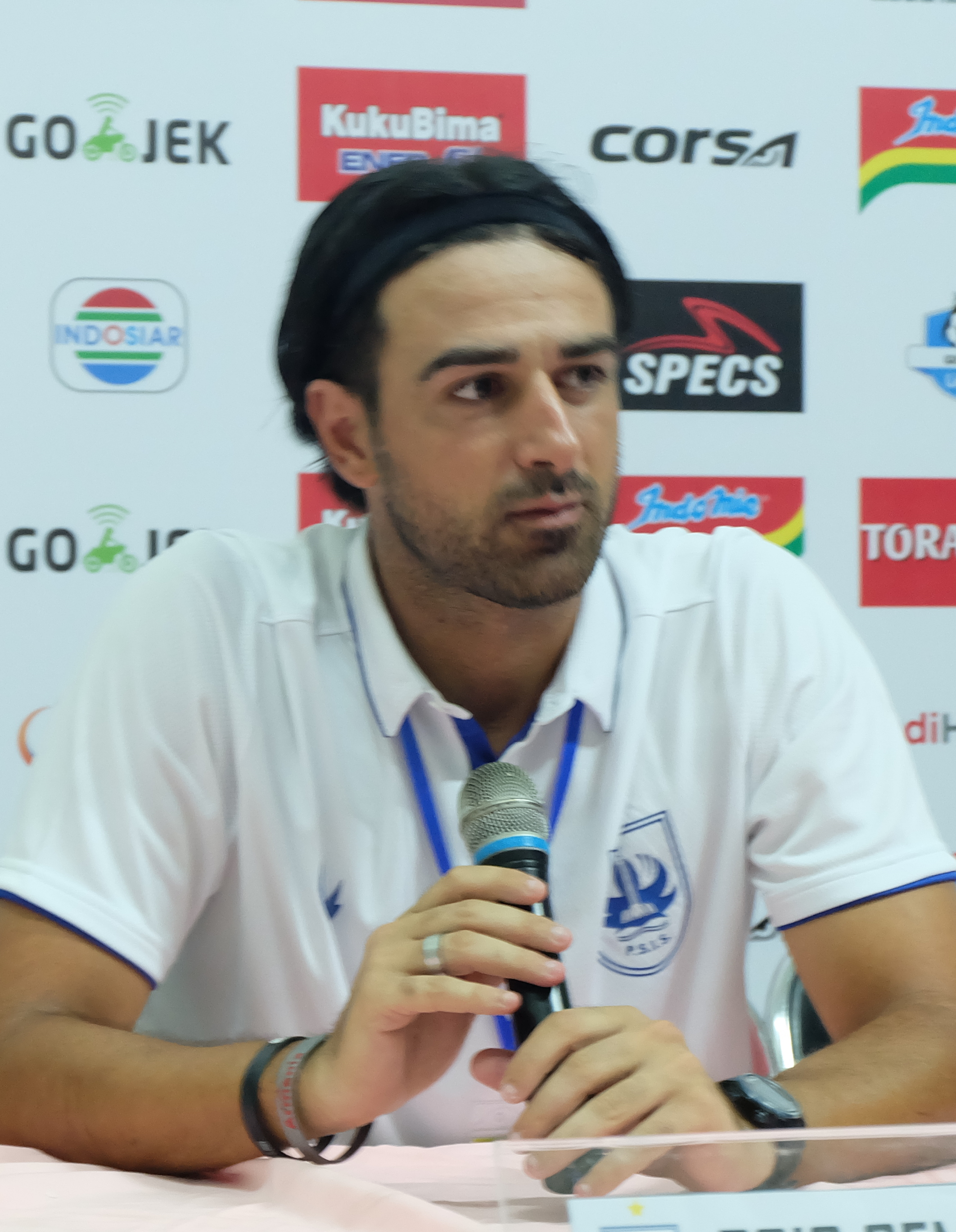
Current head coach Vincenzo Alberto Annese

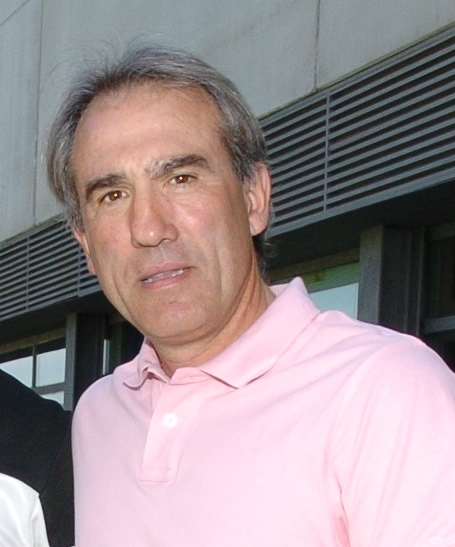
Andoni Goikoetxea became the manager of Equatorial Guinea in 2013

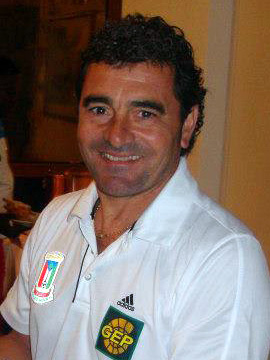
Esteban Becker became the manager of Equatorial Guinea in 2015

Position	Name
Head coach	(Italy) Vincenzo Alberto Annese
Assistant coach	(Equatorial Guinea) Casto Nopo
Goalkeeping coach	(Italy) Emiliano Betti
Doctors	(Italy) Valdo Cesareo
Physiotherapists	(Italy) Daniele Misseri
Physiotherapists	(Italy) Marco Sabatini
Physical trainers	(Italy) Alberto Lungherini
Match analyst	(Italy) Andrea Lagna

=== Coaching history ===
Caretaker managers are listed in italics.

- (Spain) Manuel Sanchís Martínez (1980)
- (Spain) Julio Raúl González (1989–1990)
- (Equatorial Guinea) Pedro Mabale (1998)
- (Spain) Jesús Martín Dorta (1999)
- (Spain) Raúl Eduardo Rodríguez (2000)
- (Equatorial Guinea) Juan Carlos Bueriberi Echuaca (2000)
- (Equatorial Guinea) Francisco Nsi Nchama (2002)
- (Spain) Jesús Martín Dorta (2003)
- (Spain) Óscar Engonga (2003)
- (Algeria) Adel Amrouche (2004)
- (Brazil) Antônio Dumas (2004–2006)
- (Spain) Quique Setién (2006)
- (Brazil) Jordan de Freitas (2007–2008)
- (Spain) Vicente Engonga (2008–2009)
- (Paraguay) Carlos Diarte (2009–2010)
- (Equatorial Guinea) Casto Nopo (2010)
- (France) Henri Michel (2010)
- (Equatorial Guinea) Casto Nopo (2011)
- (Brazil) Gílson Paulo (2012)
- (Spain) Andoni Goikoetxea (2013–2014)
- (Argentina) Esteban Becker (2015–2017)
- (Equatorial Guinea) Casto Nopo (2017)
- (France) Franck Dumas (2017–2018)
- (Equatorial Guinea) Casto Nopo (2018)
- (Spain) Ángel López (2018–2019)
- (Equatorial Guinea) Casto Nopo (2019)
- (Spain) Dani Guindos (2019)
- (France) Sébastien Migné (2019–2020)
- (Equatorial Guinea) Juan Michá & (Equatorial Guinea) Casto Nopo (2020)
- (Equatorial Guinea) Juan Michá (2021–2026) (Note: Michá was suspended by FEGUIFUT during the October 2025 FIFA window and Guillermo Ganet managed the team that time, but was restored next month.)
- (Italy) Vincenzo Alberto Annese (2026–)

=== Coaches of local-based national team ===
- (Equatorial Guinea) Rodolfo Bodipo (2017–2018)
- (Equatorial Guinea) Antonio Pancho (2019)
- (Equatorial Guinea) Felipe Esono Moreno (2019–present)

== Players ==
=== Current squad ===
The following players were called up for two 2027 AFCON qualification matches against Zimbabwe on 12 and 16 November 2026.
Caps and goals updated as of 16 November 2026 after the match against Zimbabwe.

No.	Pos.	Player	Date of birth (age)	Caps	Goals	Club
1	GK	Marcos Ondo	13 August 2000 (age 26)	7	0	(Royal Spanish Football Federation) Atlético Tomelloso
13	GK	Miguel Eyama	8 July 1998 (age 28)	8	0	(Equatoguinean Football Federation) Deportivo Mongomo
23	GK	Manuel Sapunga	23 November 1992 (age 33)	6	0	(South African Football Association) Sekhukhune United
2	DF	Santi Borikó	19 May 2003 (age 23)	4	0	(Royal Spanish Football Federation) Teruel
3	DF	Marvin Anieboh	26 August 1997 (age 29)	27	1	(Football Association of Singapore) Tanjong Pagar United
11	DF	Basilio Ndong	17 January 1999 (age 27)	64	0	(Albanian Football Federation) Tirana
12	DF	Charles Ondo	22 October 2003 (age 23)	10	0	(Norwegian Football Federation) Hødd
16	DF	Saúl Coco	9 February 1999 (age 27)	38	4	(Italian Football Federation) Torino
18	DF	Prince Ngaah	10 April 2003 (age 23)	7	0	(Royal Spanish Football Federation) Bollullos
21	DF	Esteban Obiang	7 May 1998 (age 28)	51	1	(Vietnam Football Federation) Haiphong
24	DF	Roni Mbomio	3 May 2005 (age 21)	8	0	(Canadian Soccer Association) Atlético Ottawa
4	MF	Álex Masogo	26 January 2001 (age 25)	6	1	(Football Association of Singapore) Tanjong Pagar United
6	MF	Junior Bitá	8 June 2005 (age 21)	1	0	(Royal Spanish Football Federation) Rayo Cantabria
8	MF	Jannick Buyla	6 October 1998 (age 28)	42	3	(Portuguese Football Federation) Lusitano de Évora
14	MF	Álex Balboa	6 March 2001 (age 25)	22	0	(Royal Spanish Football Federation) Valladolid
20	MF	Santiago Eneme	29 September 2000 (age 26)	45	0	(Football Association of the Czech Republic) Sparta Prague
22	MF	Pablo Ganet (captain)	4 November 1994 (age 32)	65	6	(Football Association of Indonesia) Persita Tangerang
25	MF	Gael Joel Akogo	21 December 2003 (age 22)	19	0	(Royal Spanish Football Federation) Arenas
5	FW	José Nabil Ondo	23 November 2005 (age 20)	14	1	(Portuguese Football Federation) Leiria
7	FW	Dorian Jr.	12 May 2001 (age 25)	28	1	(Danish Football Association) Viborg
9	FW	Salomón Obama	4 February 2000 (age 26)	18	1	(Andorran Football Federation) Esperança
10	FW	Loren Zúñiga	18 January 2003 (age 23)	12	2	(Libyan Football Federation) Al-Madina
15	FW	Enrique Esono	17 October 2003 (age 23)	4	0	(Estonian Football Association) Nõmme Kalju
17	FW	Josete Miranda	22 July 1998 (age 28)	54	4	(Hellenic Football Federation) Kalamata
19	FW	Cristian Makaté	21 September 2002 (age 24)	7	0	(Royal Belgian Football Association) Lierse

=== Recent call-ups ===
The following players have been called up in the last 12 months and are still eligible for selection.

Pos.	Player	Date of birth (age)	Caps	Goals	Club	Latest call-up
GK	Jesús Owono	1 March 2001 (age 25)	47	0	Andorra	v. Sierra Leone, 28 September 2026
GK	Miguel Ángel Nkogo		0	0	(Equatorial Guinea) Ebenezer	v. Sierra Leone, 28 September 2026
GK	Aitor Embela	17 April 1996 (age 30)	11	0	(Belgium) Olympic Charleroi	v. Comoros, 9 June 2026
GK	Federico Ndong		0	0	(Equatorial Guinea) Bata City	v. Comoros, 9 June 2026
DF	Carlos Akapo	12 March 1993 (age 33)	48	2	(Malaysia) Johor Darul Ta'zim	v. Zimbabwe, 12 November 2026 ^{WD}
DF	José Elo	21 October 2000 (age 26)	6	1	(Romania) Olimpia Satu Mare	v. Zimbabwe, 12 November 2026 ^{INJ}
DF	Federico Nsue	20 April 1997 (age 29)	4	0	(Ethiopia) Sidama Coffee	v. Sierra Leone, 28 September 2026
DF	Javier Mum	24 January 2001 (age 25)	3	0	Unattached	v. Sierra Leone, 28 September 2026
DF	Vicente Asumu	14 June 2001 (age 25)	9	0	Unattached	v. Comoros, 9 June 2026
DF	Marcelo Asumu	16 January 1992 (age 34)	4	0	(Equatorial Guinea) Deportivo Unidad	v. Comoros, 9 June 2026
DF	Santos Tomás Elá	28 January 1997 (age 29)	1	0	(Equatorial Guinea) The Panthers	v. Comoros, 9 June 2026
DF	Juan Pedro Nsue	22 July 1995 (age 31)	0	0	(Equatorial Guinea) Leones Vegetarianos	v. Madagascar, 31 March 2026
DF	Néstor Senra	4 January 2002 (age 24)	12	0	(Spain) Recreativo	2025 Africa Cup of Nations
MF	José Machín	14 August 1996 (age 30)	37	0	(Italy) Sambenedettese	v. Sierra Leone, 28 September 2026
MF	Omar Mascarell	2 February 1993 (age 33)	15	0	(Saudi Arabia) Al-Khaleej	v. DR Congo, 24 September 2026 ^{WD}
MF	Jesús Mansogo	16 August 2001 (age 25)	5	0	(Morocco) Chabab Ben Guerir	v. Comoros, 9 June 2026
MF	Roberto Owono	2007 (age 18–19)	1	0	(Spain) Villarreal Juvenil A	v. Comoros, 9 June 2026
MF	Bonifacio Ondo	20 March 2004 (age 22)	0	0	(Equatorial Guinea) Leones Vegetarianos	v. Comoros, 9 June 2026
MF	Federico Bikoro	17 March 1996 (age 30)	64	7	Unattached	v. Madagascar, 31 March 2026
MF	Ramón Boho	30 August 2001 (age 25)	1	0	(Equatorial Guinea) Akonangui	v. Madagascar, 31 March 2026
MF	Miguel Ángel Okue	22 October 1997 (age 29)	0	0	(Equatorial Guinea) 15 de Agosto	v. Madagascar, 31 March 2026
FW	Luis Nlavo	9 July 2001 (age 25)	32	5	(China) Shanghai Shenhua	v. Zimbabwe, 12 November 2026 ^{WD}
FW	Óscar Siafá	12 September 1997 (age 29)	18	0	(Romania) ASA Târgu Mureș	v. Comoros, 9 June 2026
FW	Jordan Gutiérrez	8 July 1998 (age 28)	14	0	(Romania) Metaloglobus București	v. Comoros, 9 June 2026
FW	José Luis Nsue	5 June 2000 (age 26)	0	0	(Equatorial Guinea) Diablo Rojo	v. Madagascar, 31 March 2026
FW	Iban Salvador	11 December 1995 (age 30)	58	10	Unattached	2025 Africa Cup of Nations
^{INJ} Withdrew due to injury^{WD} Player withdrew from the squad due to non-injury issue

=== Previous squads ===
Africa Cup of Nations

- 2012 Africa Cup of Nations squad
- 2015 Africa Cup of Nations squad
- 2021 Africa Cup of Nations squad
- 2023 Africa Cup of Nations squad

== Records ==
As of 31 December 2025
Players in bold are still active with Equatorial Guinea.

=== Most appearances ===
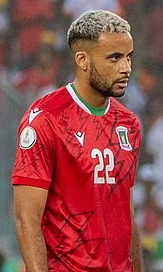
Pablo Ganet is Equatorial Guinea's most capped player with 65 appearances.

Rank	Player	Caps	Goals	Career
1	**Pablo Ganet**	65	6	2015–present
2	**Federico Bikoro**	64	7	2013–present
2	**Basilio Ndong**	64	0	2016–present
4	**Iban Salvador**	58	10	2015–present
5	**Josete Miranda**	54	4	2015–present
6	Emilio Nsue	51	25	2013–2025
6	**Esteban Obiang**	51	1	2017–present
8	**Carlos Akapo**	48	2	2013–present
9	**Jesús Owono**	47	0	2019–present
10	Juvenal Edjogo-Owono	45	9	2003–2015

=== Top goalscorers ===
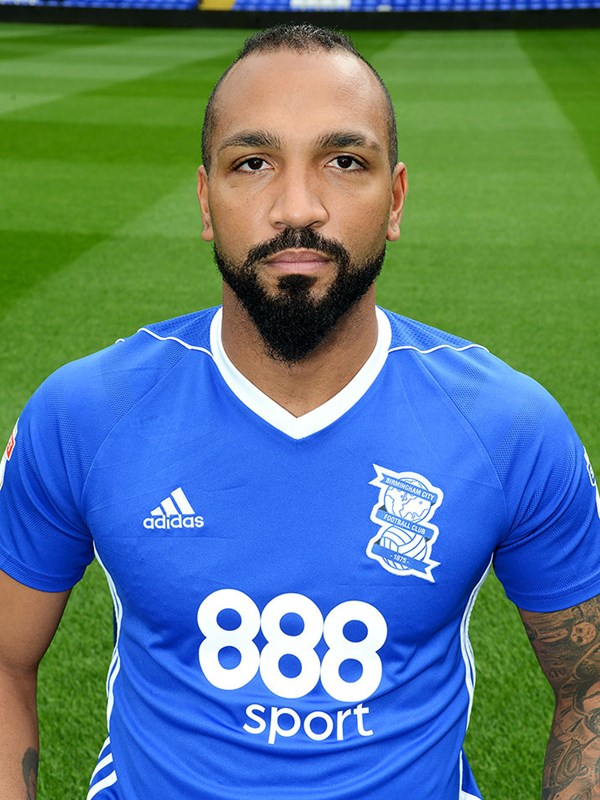
Emilio Nsue is Equatorial Guinea's top scorer with 25 goals.

Rank	Player	Goals	Caps	Ratio	Career
1	Emilio Nsue	25	51	0.49	2013–2025
2	**Iban Salvador**	10	58	0.17	2015–present
3	Juvenal Edjogo-Owono	9	45	0.2	2003–2015
4	**Federico Bikoro**	7	63	0.11	2013–present
5	**Pablo Ganet**	6	60	0.1	2015–present
6	**Pedro Oba**	5	16	0.31	2017–present
6	**Luis Nlavo**	5	32	0.16	2019–present
6	Javi Balboa	5	32	0.16	2007–2017
9	Rodolfo Bodipo	4	15	0.27	2003–2013
9	**Saúl Coco**	4	34	0.12	2017–present
9	Iban Iyanga	4	38	0.11	2010–2018
9	**Josete Miranda**	4	51	0.08	2015–present

== Competition records ==
=== FIFA World Cup ===
FIFA World Cup record									Qualification record					
Year	Round	Position	Pld	W	D*	L	GF	GA	Pld	W	D	L	GF	GA
1930 to 1966	Part of Spain								Part of Spain					
1970 to 1986	Not a FIFA member								Not a FIFA member					
1990 to 1998	Did not enter								Did not enter					
(South Korea) (Japan) 2002	Did not qualify								2	0	0	2	2	5
(Germany) 2006	Did not qualify								2	1	0	1	1	2
(South Africa) 2010	Did not qualify								6	1	0	5	4	10
(Brazil) 2014	Did not qualify								8	1	2	5	9	17
(Russia) 2018	Did not qualify								2	1	0	1	1	2
(Qatar) 2022	Did not qualify								8	4	3	1	8	6
(Canada) (Mexico) (United States) 2026	Did not qualify								10	3	2	5	8	15
(Morocco) (Portugal) (Spain) (Argentina) (Paraguay) (Uruguay) 2030	To be determined													
(Saudi Arabia) 2034	To be determined													
Total	–	0/9	–	–	–	–	–	–	38	11	7	20	33	57

=== Africa Cup of Nations ===
Africa Cup of Nations record
Year	Round	Position	Pld	W	D*	L	GF	GA
(Sudan) 1957 to (Ethiopia) 1968	Part of Spain							
(Sudan) 1970 to (Egypt) 1986	Not affiliated to CAF							
(Morocco) 1988	Withdrew							
(Algeria) 1990	Did not qualify							
(Senegal) 1992 to (Tunisia) 1994	Did not enter							
(South Africa) 1996	Withdrew							
(Burkina Faso) 1998 to (Ghana) (Nigeria) 2000	Did not enter							
(Mali) 2002 to (Angola) 2010	Did not qualify							
(Gabon) (Equatorial Guinea) 2012	Quarter-finals	7th	4	2	0	2	3	5
(South Africa) 2013	Did not qualify							
(Equatorial Guinea) 2015	Fourth place	4th	6	2	3	1	5	5
(Gabon) 2017	Did not qualify							
(Egypt) 2019	Did not qualify							
(Cameroon) 2021	Quarter-finals	7th	5	2	1	2	3	4
(Ivory Coast) 2023	Round of 16	10th	4	2	1	1	9	4
(Morocco) 2025	Group stage	23rd	3	0	0	3	2	6
(Kenya) (Tanzania) (Uganda) 2027	To be determined							
2029	To be determined							
Total	Fourth place	5/35	22	8	5	9	22	24

=== African Nations Championship ===
African Nations Championship record
Appearances: 1
Year	Round	Position	Pld	W	D*	L	GF	GA
(Ivory Coast) 2009	Did not enter							
(Sudan) 2011	Did not enter							
(South Africa) 2014	Did not qualify							
(Rwanda) 2016	Did not qualify							
(Morocco) 2018	Group stage	15th	3	0	0	3	1	7
(Cameroon) 2020	Did not qualify							
(Algeria) 2022	Did not qualify							
Total	Group stage	1/7	3	0	0	3	1	7

== Honours ==
=== Regional ===
- CEMAC Cup
  - (gold) Champions (1): 2006
  - (silver) Runners-up (1): 2009
