= Georgi Minoungou =

Ivorian-Burkinabe footballer (born 2002)

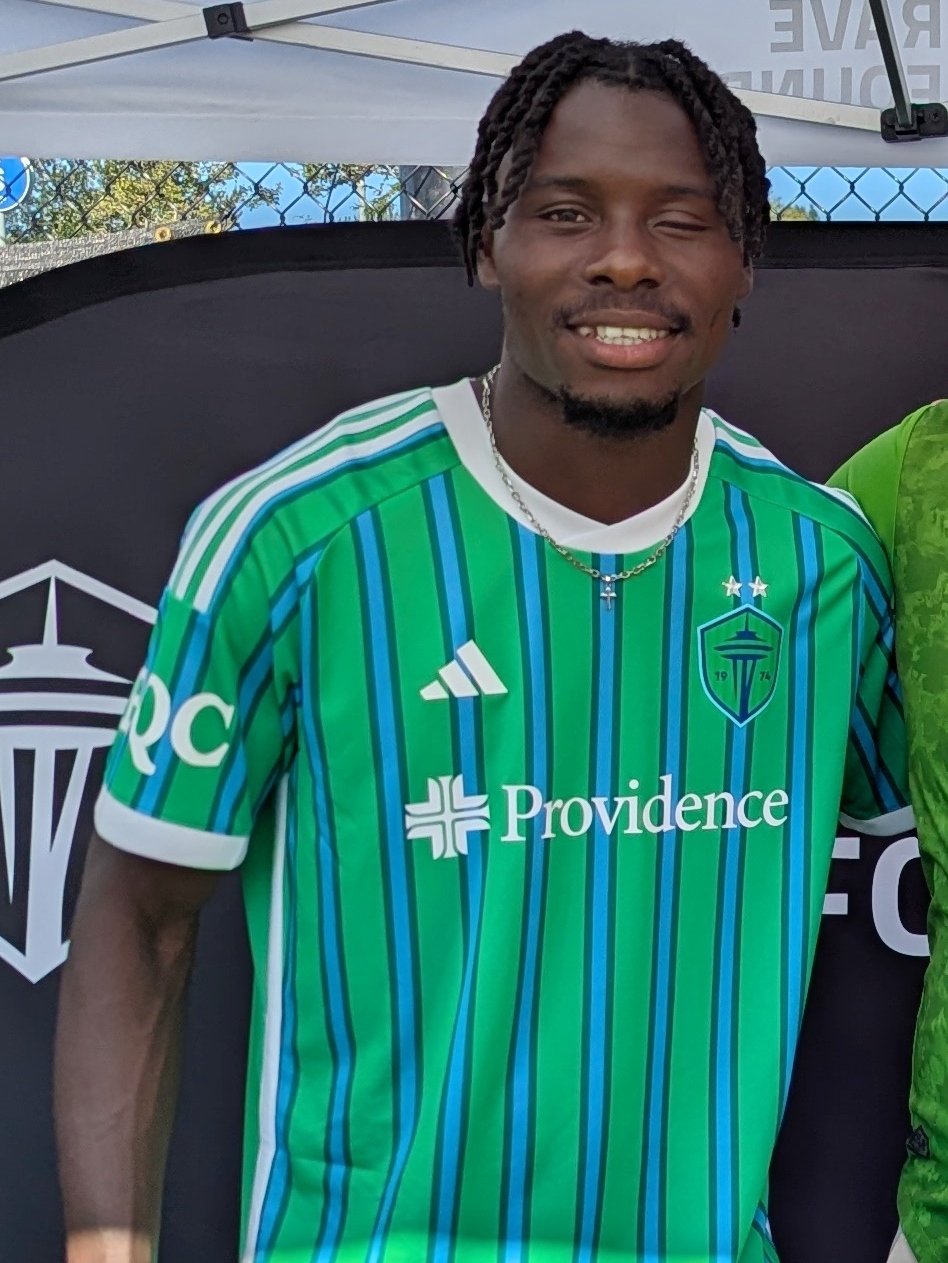
- Minoungou in 2025

Personal information
- Date of birth: 25 July 2002 (age 24)
- Place of birth: Batiebly-Douibly, Ivory Coast
- Height: 5 ft 10 in (1.78 m)
- Position: Winger

Team information
- Current team: Colorado Rapids
- Number: 93

Senior career*
Years	Team	Apps	(Gls)
2021–2022	MFK Vyškov	0	(0)
2022	→ Tacoma Defiance (loan)	16	(2)
2023–2025	Tacoma Defiance	43	(3)
2024	→ Seattle Sounders (loan)	10	(1)
2025–2026	Seattle Sounders	21	(1)
2026–	Colorado Rapids	9	(0)

International career^{‡}
2020	Ivory Coast U20		
2025–	Burkina Faso	9	(3)
- * Club domestic league appearances and goals as of 21:28, 18 June 2026 (UTC) ‡ National team caps and goals as of 22:08, 10 January 2026 (UTC)

Georgi Minoungou (born 25 July 2002) is a professional footballer who plays as a winger for Major League Soccer club Colorado Rapids. Born in Ivory Coast, he represents the Burkina Faso national team.

== Club career ==
Minoungou was signed by Czech side MFK Vyškov in 2021, and was loaned to American MLS Next Pro side Tacoma Defiance. He was signed to Defiance for the 2023 season for a transfer fee estimated between $250,000 and $500,000. In 2023 he traveled with senior MLS side Seattle Sounders FC for their practice in Marbella, Spain, ahead of the 2023 FIFA Club World Cup, scoring a goal in a friendly against Swedish side Hammarby IF.

In 2023, he suffered a serious eye infection, with the resulting surgery leaving him effectively blind in his left eye.

He received multiple callups to the Sounders in 2024 both for their U.S. Open Cup run and league play. He tallied an assist against Louisville City FC in a win decided on penalty kicks. He made his MLS league debut with the Sounders against the LA Galaxy on 5 May 2024. Minoungou was signed to a permanent, four-year contract with the first team on 28 August 2024.

On March 27, 2026, Minoungou was traded to the Colorado Rapids from Seattle in exchange for $2,000,000 in General Allocation Money (GAM), split between the 2026 and 2027 seasons ($1,000,000 in 2026 and $1,000,000 in 2027). He made his debut for the club on April 11, 2026, against Houston Dynamo, coming on as a substitute in the 68th minute, and providing an assist to Rafael Navarro in a 6–2 victory. Minounguo scored his first goal for the Rapids in the U.S. Open Cup on April 29, 2026, against the Colorado Springs Switchbacks, assisted by Rafael Navarro.

== International career ==
Minoungou has made appearances for the Ivory Coast national under-20 football team. On 3 September 2025, Minoungou was called up to the Burkina Faso national team. On 5 September, he made his first senior international appearance, as a substitute in a 6–0 victory in FIFA World Cup qualification. On 18 November, Minoungou scored two goals for Burkina Faso in a friendly against Benin.

On 8 December 2025, Minoungou was named among the 25 players selected by head coach Brama Traoré to represent Burkina Faso at the 2025 Africa Cup of Nations.

== Style of play ==
Minoungou stood out among second team callups for his speed on the wing, his ability to control the ball in 1-v-1 attacks, and his willingness to attack the goal.

== Career statistics ==
=== International ===
As of match played 6 January 2026.

Appearances and goals by national team and year
National team	Year	Apps	Goals
Burkina Faso	2025	8	3
Burkina Faso	2026	1	0
Total		9	3

List of international goals scored by Georgi Minoungou
No.	Date	Venue	Opponent	Score	Result	Competition
1.	18 November 2025	El Bachir Stadium, Mohammedia, Morocco	Benin	1–0	3–0	Friendly
2.	18 November 2025	El Bachir Stadium, Mohammedia, Morocco	Benin	2–0	3–0	Friendly
3.	24 December 2025	Stade Mohammed V, Casablanca, Morocco	Equatorial Guinea	1–1	2–1	2025 Africa Cup of Nations

== Honours ==
Seattle Sounders FC

- Leagues Cup: 2025
