= Josué Tiendrébéogo =

Burkinabé footballer (born 2004)

Personal information
- Full name: Wendkuuni Josué Tiendrébéogo
- Date of birth: 21 November 2002 (age 23)
- Place of birth: Ouagadougou, Burkina Faso
- Height: 1.69 m (5 ft 7 in)
- Position: Attacking midfielder

Team information
- Current team: IMT
- Number: 18

Youth career
- 2014–2019: Football Plus Academy

Senior career*
Years	Team	Apps	(Gls)
2019–2024	Majestic FC	96	(16)
2024–2026	Annecy	39	(5)
2026–	IMT	13	(0)

International career^{‡}
2022–	Burkina Faso	7	(2)
- * Club domestic league appearances and goals as of 13 June 2026 ‡ National team caps and goals as of 23:00, 5 September 2025 (UTC)

Wendkuuni Josué Tiendrébéogo (born 21 November 2002) is a Burkinabé professional football player who plays as an attacking midfielder for Serbian SuperLiga club IMT and the Burkina Faso national team.

== Career ==
A youth product of Football Plus Academy, Tiendrébéogo began his senior career with Majestic FC in the Burkinabé Premier League in 2019. In 2024, he was the league's top scorer and player of the season. On 6 August 2024, he transferred to the French club Annecy in the Ligue 2 on a 2-year contract.

== International career ==
Tiendrébéogo was called up to the Burkina Faso national team since 2022, originally with their A' side. In November 2024, he was called up to the national team for a set of 2025 Africa Cup of Nations qualification matches.

=== International goals ===
As of match played 5 September 2025

Appearances and goals by national team and year
National team	Year	Apps	Goals
Burkina Faso	2024	2	0
Burkina Faso	2025	5	2
Total		7	2

Scores and results list Burkina Faso's goal tally first.

List of international goals scored by Josué Tiendrébéogo
No.	Date	Venue	Opponent	Score	Result	Competition
1	21 March 2025	Stade du 4 Août, Ouagadougou, Burkina Faso	Djibouti	1–0	4–1	2026 FIFA World Cup qualification
2	5 September 2025	Estádio 24 de Setembro, Bissau, Guinea-Bissau	Djibouti	2–0	6–0	2026 FIFA World Cup qualification

== Honours ==
Individual

- Burkinabé Premier League Player of the Season 2023–24
- Burkinabé Premier League Top Scorer 2023–24
