= 2026 FIFA World Cup qualification – CAF Group A =

Association football competition in Africa

The 2026 FIFA World Cup qualification – CAF Group A was a CAF qualifying group for the 2026 FIFA World Cup. The group contained Egypt, Burkina Faso, Guinea-Bissau, Sierra Leone, Ethiopia and Djibouti.

The group winners, Egypt, directly qualified for the World Cup. The group runners-up, Burkina Faso, were eliminated as one of the five worst runners-up.

== Standings ==
Pos	Team	Pld	W	D	L	GF	GA	GD	Pts	Qualification	(Egypt)	(Burkina Faso)	(Sierra Leone)	(Guinea-Bissau)	(Ethiopia)	(Djibouti)
1	Egypt	10	8	2	0	20	2	+18	26	2026 FIFA World Cup	—	2–1	1–0	1–0	2–0	6–0
2	Burkina Faso	10	6	3	1	23	8	+15	21		0–0	—	2–2	1–1	3–1	4–1
3	Sierra Leone	10	4	3	3	12	10	+2	15		0–2	0–1	—	3–1	2–0	2–1
4	Guinea-Bissau	10	2	4	4	8	10	−2	10		1–1	1–2	1–1	—	0–0	2–0
5	Ethiopia	10	2	3	5	9	14	−5	9		0–2	0–3	0–0	1–0	—	6–1
6	Djibouti	10	0	1	9	5	33	−28	1		0–3	0–6	1–2	0–1	1–1	—

Source: FIFA
Rules for classification: Tiebreakers

== Matches ==
15 November 2023
20:00 UTC+1

Ethiopia	0–0	Sierra Leone
	Report

Ben M'Hamed El Abdi Stadium, El Jadida (Morocco)
Attendance: 50
Referee: Celso Alvação (Mozambique)
16 November 2023
18:00 UTC+2

Egypt	6–0	Djibouti
Salah 17', 22' (pen.), 48', 69'; Mohamed 73'; Trézéguet 89'	Report

Cairo International Stadium, Cairo
Attendance: 6,000
Referee: Jelly Chavani (South Africa)
17 November 2023
20:00 UTC+1

Burkina Faso	1–1	Guinea-Bissau
B. Traoré 61'	Report	Mam. Baldé 20'

Marrakesh Stadium, Marrakesh (Morocco)
Attendance: 405
Referee: Alhadi Allaou Mahamat (Chad)

19 November 2023
16:00 UTC+0

Sierra Leone	0–2	Egypt
	Report	Trézéguet 18', 62'

Samuel Kanyon Doe Sports Complex, Paynesville (Liberia)
Attendance: 8,916
Referee: Jean-Jacques Ndala (DR Congo)
20 November 2023
15:00 UTC+2

Djibouti	0–1	Guinea-Bissau
	Report	Rodrigues 39'

Al Salam Stadium, Cairo (Egypt)
Attendance: 35
Referee: Mohamed Athoumani (Comoros)
21 November 2023
14:00 UTC+1

Ethiopia	0–3	Burkina Faso
	Report	Touré 69'; B. Traoré 78' (pen.); Da. Ouattara 90'

Ben M'Hamed El Abdi Stadium, El Jadida (Morocco)
Attendance: 385
Referee: Lamin Jammeh (Gambia)

5 June 2024
17:00 UTC+1

Sierra Leone	2–1	Djibouti
Davies 12'; Kargbo 51'	Report	Dadzie 35' (pen.)

Ben M'Hamed El Abdi Stadium, El Jadida (Morocco)
Attendance: 250
Referee: Godfrey Nkhakananga (Malawi)
6 June 2024
22:00 UTC+3

Egypt	2–1	Burkina Faso
Trézéguet 3', 8'	Report	L. Traoré 57'

Cairo International Stadium, Cairo
Attendance: 65,000
Referee: Peter Waweru (Kenya)
6 June 2024
16:00 UTC+0

Guinea-Bissau	0–0	Ethiopia
	Report

Estádio 24 de Setembro, Bissau
Referee: Djindo Louis Houngnandande (Benin)

9 June 2024
17:00 UTC+1

Djibouti	1–1	Ethiopia
Dadzie 29'	Report	Wondimu 31'

Ben M'Hamed El Abdi Stadium, El Jadida (Morocco)
Attendance: 100
Referee: Chelanget Sabila (Uganda)
10 June 2024
16:00 UTC+0

Guinea-Bissau	1–1	Egypt
Mam. Baldé 42'	Report	Salah 70'

Estádio 24 de Setembro, Bissau
Referee: Mahmood Ali Mahmood Ismail (Sudan)
10 June 2024
19:00 UTC+0

Burkina Faso	2–2	Sierra Leone
Da. Ouattara 41'; L. Traoré 45+2' (pen.)	Report	Kargbo 58'; Bakayoko 88'

Stade du 26 Mars, Bamako (Mali)
Referee: Lahlou Benbraham (Algeria)

20 March 2025
16:00 UTC+0

Sierra Leone	3–1	Guinea-Bissau
Bundu 19'; Mu. Kamara 61'; I. Turay 90+6'	Report	Monteiro 68'

Samuel Kanyon Doe Sports Complex, Paynesville (Liberia)
Attendance: 6,443
Referee: Daniel Nii Laryea (Ghana)
21 March 2025
17:00 UTC+1

Burkina Faso	4–1	Djibouti
Tiendrébéogo 12'; B. Traoré 33'; Zougrana 47'; L. Traoré 67'	Report	Akinbinu 88' (pen.)

Ben M'Hamed El Abdi Stadium, El Jadida (Morocco)
Attendance: 244
Referee: Abdel Aziz Bouh (Mauritania)
21 March 2025
22:00 UTC+1

Ethiopia	0–2	Egypt
	Report	Salah 31'; Zizo 40'

Larbi Zaouli Stadium, Casablanca (Morocco)
Attendance: 300
Referee: Patrice Milazar (Mauritius)

24 March 2025
16:00 UTC+0

Guinea-Bissau	1–2	Burkina Faso
Banjaqui 36'	Report	L. Traoré 6', 73'

Estádio 24 de Setembro, Bissau
Attendance: 6,443
Referee: Samuel Uwikunda (Rwanda)
24 March 2025
22:00 UTC+1

Ethiopia	6–1	Djibouti
Desta 19', 52', 70' (pen.); Nassir 34', 37', 58' (pen.)	Report	Akinbinu 51'

Ben M'Hamed El Abdi Stadium, El Jadida (Morocco)
Attendance: 100
Referee: Luxolo Badi (South Africa)
25 March 2025
21:00 UTC+2

Egypt	1–0	Sierra Leone
Zizo 45+2'	Report

Cairo International Stadium, Cairo
Referee: Ahmad Heeralall (Mauritius)

4 September 2025
16:00 UTC+0

Guinea-Bissau	1–1	Sierra Leone
Mam. Baldé 74'	Report	K. Kamara 45+1'

Estádio 24 de Setembro, Bissau
Referee: Clement Franklin Kpan (Ivory Coast)
5 September 2025
16:00 UTC+0

Djibouti	0–6	Burkina Faso
	Report	Irié 16'; Tiendrébéogo 25'; Tapsoba 36', 43'; Da. Ouattara 59', 86' (pen.)

Estádio 24 de Setembro, Bissau (Guinea-Bissau)
Referee: Younoussa Tawel Camara (Guinea)
5 September 2025
21:00 UTC+2

Egypt	2–0	Ethiopia
Salah 41' (pen.); Marmoush 45+2' (pen.)	Report

Cairo International Stadium, Cairo
Attendance: 37,000
Referee: Abongile Tom (South Africa)

8 September 2025
16:00 UTC+0

Guinea-Bissau	2–0	Djibouti
Imbeni 54'; Candé 82'	Report

Estádio 24 de Setembro, Bissau
Referee: Aklesso Gnama (Togo)
9 September 2025
13:00 UTC+0

Sierra Leone	2–0	Ethiopia
M. Kamara 37'; Koroma 90+6'	Report

Samuel Kanyon Doe Sports Complex, Paynesville (Liberia)
Referee: Yannick Malala (Democratic Republic of the Congo)
9 September 2025
16:00 UTC+0

Burkina Faso	0–0	Egypt
	Report

Stade du 4 Août, Ouagadougou
Referee: Messie Nkounkou (Republic of Congo)

8 October 2025
15:00 UTC+2

Ethiopia	1–0	Guinea-Bissau
James 27'	Report

Amahoro Stadium, Kigali (Rwanda)
Referee: Jelly Alfred Chavani (South Africa)
8 October 2025
17:00 UTC+1

Djibouti	0–3	Egypt
	Report	Adel 8'; Salah 14', 84'

Larbi Zaouli Stadium, Casablanca (Morocco)
Attendance: 1,200
Referee: Tanguy Mebiame (Gabon)
8 October 2025
16:00 UTC+0

Sierra Leone	0–1	Burkina Faso
	Report	Zougrana 42'

Samuel Kanyon Doe Sports Complex, Paynesville (Liberia)
Attendance: 406
Referee: Jean-Jacques Ndala (DR Congo)

12 October 2025
19:00 UTC+0

Burkina Faso	3–1	Ethiopia
P. Kaboré 65', 82', 90+6'	Report	Biniam 84'

Stade du 4 Août, Ouagadougou
Referee: Adalbert Diouf (Senegal)
12 October 2025
20:00 UTC+1

Djibouti	1–2	Sierra Leone
Farah 29'	Report	Bah 45+2'; Tarawallie 72'

Larbi Zaouli Stadium, Casablanca (Morocco)
Referee: Thulani Sibandze (Eswatini)
12 October 2025
21:00 UTC+2

Egypt	1–0	Guinea-Bissau
Hamdy 10'	Report

Cairo International Stadium, Cairo
Attendance: 41,000
Referee: Daniel Nii Laryea (Ghana)

== Goalscorers ==
There were 77 goals scored in 30 matches, for an average of 2.57 goals per match.

9 goals

- (Egypt national football team) Mohamed Salah

5 goals

- (Burkina Faso national football team) Lassina Traoré
- (Egypt national football team) Trézéguet

4 goals

- (Burkina Faso national football team) Dango Ouattara

3 goals

- (Burkina Faso national football team) Pierre Landry Kaboré
- (Burkina Faso national football team) Bertrand Traoré
- (Ethiopia national football team) Bereket Desta
- (Ethiopia national football team) Abubeker Nassir
- (Guinea-Bissau national football team) Mama Baldé

2 goals

- (Burkina Faso national football team) Edmond Tapsoba
- (Burkina Faso national football team) Josué Tiendrébéogo
- (Burkina Faso national football team) Mohamed Zougrana
- (Djibouti national football team) Samuel Akinbinu
- (Djibouti national football team) Gabriel Dadzie
- (Egypt national football team) Zizo
- (Sierra Leone national football team) Augustus Kargbo

1 goal

- (Burkina Faso national football team) Cyriaque Irié
- (Burkina Faso national football team) Blati Touré
- (Djibouti national football team) Abdichakour Farah
- (Egypt national football team) Ibrahim Adel
- (Egypt national football team) Mohamed Hamdy
- (Egypt national football team) Omar Marmoush
- (Egypt national football team) Mostafa Mohamed
- (Ethiopia national football team) Biniam Ayten
- (Ethiopia national football team) Ramkel James
- (Ethiopia national football team) Minyelu Wondimu
- (Guinea-Bissau national football team) Zidane Banjaqui
- (Guinea-Bissau national football team) Fali Candé
- (Guinea-Bissau national football team) Iano Imbeni
- (Guinea-Bissau national football team) Tamble Monteiro
- (Guinea-Bissau national football team) Mauro Rodrigues
- (Sierra Leone national football team) Juma Bah
- (Sierra Leone national football team) Amadou Bakayoko
- (Sierra Leone national football team) Mustapha Bundu
- (Sierra Leone national football team) Curtis Davies
- (Sierra Leone national football team) Kei Kamara
- (Sierra Leone national football team) Momoh Kamara
- (Sierra Leone national football team) Musa Noah Kamara
- (Sierra Leone national football team) Alhassan Koroma
- (Sierra Leone national football team) Sallieu Tarawallie
- (Sierra Leone national football team) Ibrahim Turay

== Discipline ==
A player was automatically suspended for the next match for the following infractions:

- Receiving a red card (red card suspensions could be extended for serious infractions)
- Receiving two yellow cards in two different matches (yellow card suspensions were carried forward to further qualification rounds, but not the finals or any other future international matches)

The following suspensions were served during the group stage:

Team	Player	Infraction(s)	Suspended for match(es)
Burkina Faso	Issoufou Dayo	(yellow card) vs Guinea-Bissau (17 November 2023); (yellow card) vs Djibouti (21 March 2025)	vs Guinea-Bissau (24 March 2025)
Burkina Faso	Ismahila Ouédraogo	(yellow card) vs Guinea-Bissau (17 November 2023); (yellow card) vs Ethiopia (21 November 2023)	vs Egypt (6 June 2024)
Burkina Faso	Steeve Yago	(yellow card) vs Sierra Leone (10 June 2024); (yellow card) vs Guinea-Bissau (24 March 2025)	vs Djibouti (5 September 2025)
Djibouti	Ahmed Aden	(yellow card) vs Guinea-Bissau (20 November 2023); (yellow card) vs Ethiopia (9 June 2024)	vs Burkina Faso (21 March 2025)
Djibouti	Yabe Siad Isman	(red card) vs Burkina Faso (5 September 2025)	vs Guinea-Bissau (8 September 2025)
Egypt	Marwan Attia	(yellow card) vs Djibouti (16 November 2023); (yellow card) vs Sierra Leone (25 March 2025)	vs Ethiopia (5 September 2025)
Guinea-Bissau	Marcelo Djaló	(yellow card) vs Djibouti (20 November 2023); (yellow card) vs Egypt (10 June 2024)	vs Sierra Leone (20 March 2025)
Guinea-Bissau	Houboulang Mendes	(yellow card) (yellow-red card) vs Djibouti (20 November 2023)	vs Ethiopia (6 June 2024)
Guinea-Bissau	Alfa Semedo	(yellow card) vs Burkina Faso (17 November 2023); (yellow card) vs Burkina Faso (24 March 2025)	vs Sierra Leone (4 September 2025)
Sierra Leone	Tyrese Fornah	(red card) vs Egypt (19 November 2023)	vs Djibouti (5 June 2024) vs Burkina Faso (10 June 2024)
Sierra Leone	Abdul Jarju Kabia	(yellow card) (yellow-red card) vs Egypt (19 November 2023)	vs Djibouti (5 June 2024)
