= Gael Joel Akogo =

Equatoguinean footballer (born 2003)

Gael Joel
Personal information
- Full name: Gael Joel Akogo Esono Nchama
- Date of birth: 21 December 2003 (age 22)
- Place of birth: Ebibeyin, Equatorial Guinea
- Position: Central midfielder

Team information
- Current team: Arenas
- Number: 16

Youth career
- Cano Sport

Senior career*
Years	Team	Apps	(Gls)
201?–2023	Cano Sport		
2023–2024	Albacete B	25	(1)
2024–2026	Granada B	49	(1)
2025–2026	Granada	0	(0)
2026–	Arenas	4	(0)

International career^{‡}
2022–	Equatorial Guinea	5	(0)
- * Club domestic league appearances and goals as of 20 September 2026 ‡ National team caps and goals as of 28 March 2023

Gael Joel Akogo Esono Nchama (born 21 December 2003), sometimes known as Gael Joel or just Gael, is an Equatoguinean footballer who plays as a midfielder for Primera Federación club Arenas and the Equatorial Guinea national team.

== Club career ==
Gael is a product of Cano Sport Academy in Equatorial Guinea.

== International career ==
Gael made his senior debut for Equatorial Guinea on 23 March 2022, as a substitution during the second half of a 0–3 friendly loss to Guinea-Bissau.
