= Michael Ngaah =

Equatoguinean footballer (born 2000)

Personal information
- Full name: Michael Ngaah Bosio
- Date of birth: 10 April 2003 (age 23)
- Place of birth: Valencia, Spain
- Height: 1.70 m (5 ft 7 in)
- Position: Left-back

Team information
- Current team: Bollullos

Youth career
- Alboraya
- 2021–2022: CD La Charca

Senior career*
Years	Team	Apps	(Gls)
2022	Haro	2	(0)
2022–2023	Casalarreina	25	(10)
2023–2024	Peña Balsamaiso	30	(3)
2024–2025	Logroñés B	28	(7)
2025–2026	Real Ávila	14	(0)
2026–	Bollullos	0	(0)

International career^{‡}
2025–	Equatorial Guinea	3	(0)
- * Club domestic league appearances and goals as of 23:55, 21 December 2025 (UTC) ‡ National team caps and goals as of 23:55, 21 December 2025 (UTC)

Michael Ngaah Bosio (born 10 April 2003), sometimes known as Prince, is a professional footballer who plays as a left-back for Tercera Federación club Bollullos. Born in Spain, he plays for the Equatorial Guinea national team.

== Club career ==
Ngaah is a product of the youth academies of the Spanish clubs Alboraya and CD La Charca. He began his senior career in the Tercera Federación with Haro and then Casalarreina in 2022. In 2023 he moved to Logroñés' affiliate club Peña Balsamaiso, before joining Logroñés B for the 2024–2025 season. On 7 July 2025, he transferred to Segunda Federación club Real Ávila.

== International career ==
Ngaah was born in Spain to a Cameroonian father and Equatoguinean mother, and holds dual Spanish and Equatoguinean citizenship. He was called up to the Equatorial Guinea national team for the 2025 Africa Cup of Nations.
