= Juan Micha =

Equatoguinean football manager

Juan Michá
Personal information
- Full name: Juan Michá Obiang Bicogo
- Date of birth: 28 July 1975 (age 51)
- Place of birth: Bata, Equatorial Guinea
- Position: Forward

International career^{‡}
Years	Team	Apps	(Gls)
1998–2002	Equatorial Guinea	3	(0)

Managerial career
- Fuenlabrada (assistant)
- 2012–2014: Equatorial Guinea Women (assistant)
- 2014: Equatorial Guinea U-20 Women
- 2015–2017: Equatorial Guinea (assistant)
- 2015: Equatorial Guinea U17
- 2015: Equatorial Guinea U20
- 2016: Deportivo Unidad
- 2020: Equatorial Guinea U17
- 2020: Equatorial Guinea (interim)
- 2021–2026: Equatorial Guinea
- ‡ National team caps and goals as of 13 October 2002

Juan Michá Obiang Bicogo (born 28 July 1975) is an Equatoguinean professional football manager and former player who played as a forward. He served as the head coach of the Equatorial Guinea national team. Under Michá's management, the Nzalang Nacional has qualified on its own merits to three editions of the Africa Cup of Nations in a row (2021, 2023 and 2025).

== International career ==
Michá was capped for Equatorial Guinea at senior level in late 1990s and early 2000s.

== Managerial career ==
After finishing his playing career, Michá became a manager in Madrid, Spain. While in CF Fuenlabrada, he knew Esteban Becker, whom he convinced to take the Equatorial Guinea women's national team in 2012. He has integrated Becker's coaching staff in both women's and men's national teams.

By 2015, Michá was also the head coach of the Equatorial Guinea national under-17 team. In July 2020, he presented his candidacy to be named in charge of the senior Equatorial Guinea men's national team, after Frenchman Sébastien Migné left the position vacant.

On 23 September 2020, Michá was appointed by the Equatoguinean Football Federation (FEGUIFUT) to coach once again the national under-17 team. On 29 October 2020, as Equatorial Guinea did not have an official head coach for the senior national team at the time, he was summoned by FEGUIFUT President Gustavo Ndong to take the side (along with Casto Nopo) for the two upcoming official matches against Libya in November. As Nzalang Nacional won both games, he was asked by FEGUIFUT to continue in the bench, but he wanted to sign a contract first.

On 23 March 2021, Michá officially signed a one-year contract to be the next head coach of Equatorial Guinea. Two days later, his team defeated Tanzania 1–0 and qualified to the 2021 Africa Cup of Nations. On 17 June 2023, he led his country to a 1–0 win over Tunisia, ensuring their qualification to the 2023 Africa Cup of Nations. He later helped secure his nation's qualification for the 2025 Africa Cup of Nations, after finishing as runners-up in their qualifying group. In October 2025, Michá was suspended and several players were removed from the active squad following the cancellation of their away match against Malawi during the 2026 FIFA World Cup qualification. Guillermo Ganet served as interim coach during the national team's World Cup qualifiers match against Liberia, before Michá was reinstated as head coach later that month. In December of that year, he led his country to their third consecutive AFCON tournament under his leadership.

Michá last coached Equatorial Guinea in a 0–1 friendly loss to Comoros on 9 June 2026. Three days later, his contract was rescinded by FEGUIFUT.

== Managerial record ==
As of match played 9 June 2026

Managerial record by team and tenure
Team	From	To	Record				
Team	From	To	G	W	D	L	Win %
Equatorial Guinea	March 2021	June 2026	59	21	16	22	35.59
Career Total			59	21	16	22	35.59
