= Arsène Kouassi =

Burkinabé footballer (born 2004)

Personal information
- Full name: Kan Guy Arsène Kouassi
- Date of birth: 2 January 2004 (age 22)
- Place of birth: Cocody, Ivory Coast
- Height: 1.78 m (5 ft 10 in)
- Position: Left-back

Team information
- Current team: Lorient
- Number: 43

Youth career
- New Stars FC
- 2021–2022: Ajaccio

Senior career*
Years	Team	Apps	(Gls)
2022–2025	Ajaccio II	29	(2)
2023–2025	Ajaccio	24	(0)
2025–	Lorient	31	(2)

International career^{‡}
2025–	Burkina Faso	6	(1)
- * Club domestic league appearances and goals as of 19 May 2026 ‡ National team caps and goals as of 19:00, 31 December 2025 (UTC)

Kan Guy Arsène Kouassi (born 2 January 2004) is a professional footballer who plays as a left-back for Ligue 1 club Lorient and the Burkina Faso national team. Born in the Ivory Coast, he made his debut for the Burkina Faso national team in 2025.

== Career ==
A youth product of New Stars FC, Kouassi moved to Ajaccio's academy in 2021 and was promoted to their reserves in 2022. He made his senior and professional debut with the senior Ajaccio side in a 4–1 Coupe de France win over Toulouse Métropole FC on 19 November 2023. On 4 September 2024, he signed his first professional contract with Ajaccio until 2027.

On 24 July 2025, Kouassi signed a four-year contract with Lorient in Ligue 1.

== International career ==
Born in the Ivory Coast, Kouassi is of Burkinabé descent and holds dual Ivorian-Burkinabé citizenship. He was called up to the Burkina Faso national team for a set of 2026 FIFA World Cup qualification matches in March 2025.
