= Moulay El Hassan Stadium =

Stadium in Rabat, Morocco

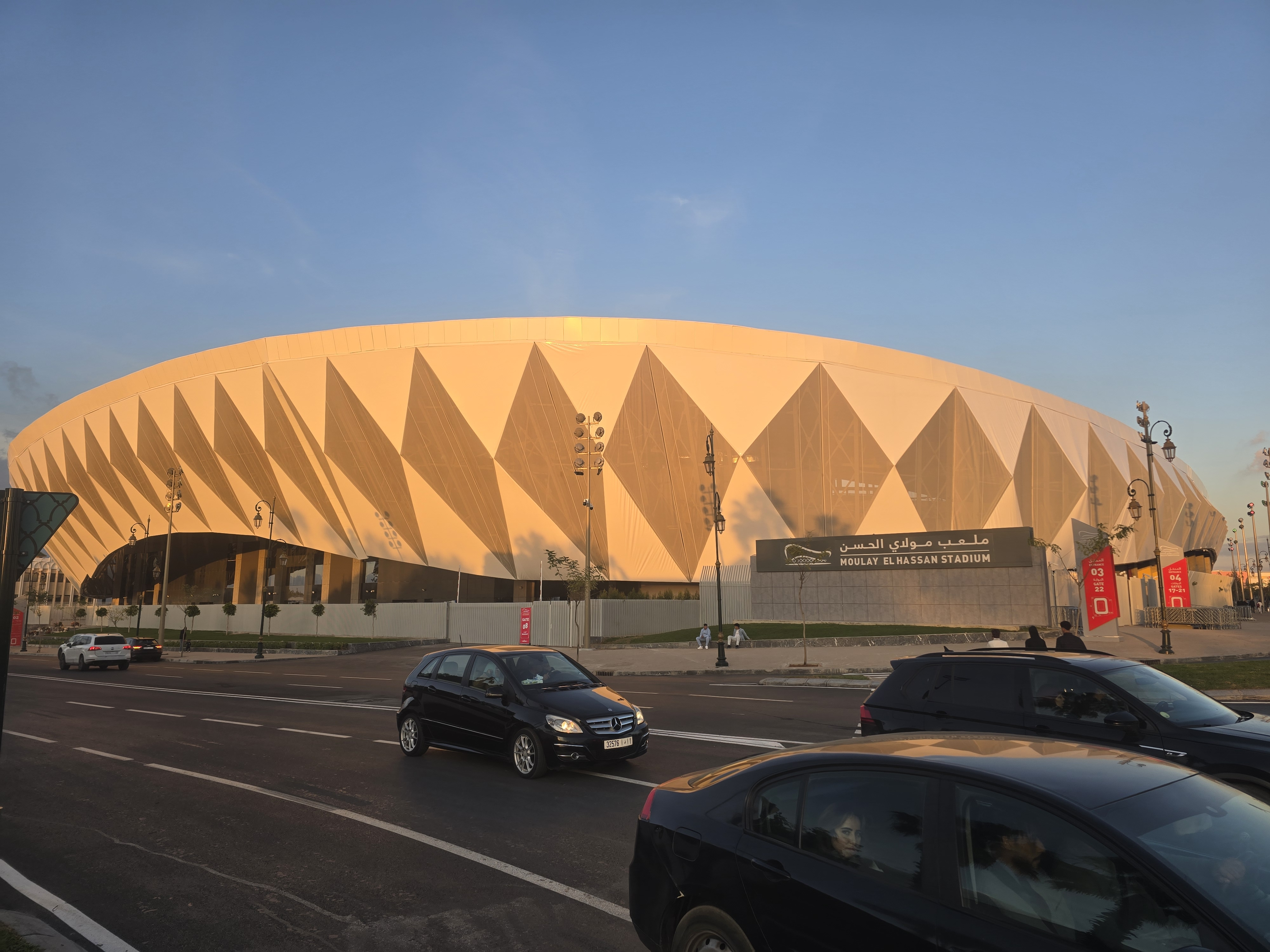
- Interactive map of Moulay El Hassan Stadium
- Full name: Moulay El Hassan Stadium
- Address: Rabat; Morocco
- Location: Avenue Mohamed Hassan Ouazzani, Rabat, Morocco
- Coordinates: 33.9755°N 6.8243°W
- Owner: Royal Moroccan Football Federation
- Operator: Sonarges
- Capacity: 22,000
- Surface: GrassMaster

Construction
- Groundbreaking: 2024
- Built: 2024–2025
- Opened: 13 November 2025; 11 months ago

Tenant
- FUS Rabat

Website
- sonarges.ma

Moulay El Hassan Stadium is a football stadium in the area of El Youssoufia, Rabat, Morocco, which has been the home of FUS Rabat since 2012. The stadium has a seating capacity of 22,000. The old stadium was renovated in 2012 and demolished in 2024.

The old stadium was demolished in 2024 as part of Morocco's preparations to host the 2025 Africa Cup of Nations and the 2025 FIFA U-17 Women's World Cup. The renovation project included expanding the stadium's capacity to 22,000 and constructing commercial centers within the venue, and integrated it with the surrounding public spaces.

== History ==
Moulay El Hassan Stadium in Rabat has long stood as one of the most significant sporting facilities accompanying the journey of Fath Union Sport and the capital's public life for decades. Since its initial construction, the stadium was conceived as a practical venue for football within the city, later evolving gradually as the level of national competition rose and the need for more modern infrastructure increased. Over the years, it became a central hub of sporting activity in the Nahda district, hosting FUS matches in the Moroccan league along with various local fixtures that wove it into the collective memory of its supporters.

The stadium experienced its first major turning point in 2012, when it underwent extensive renovation that improved its stands and facilities, enabling it to continue fulfilling its role at a time when sporting standards were rising and clubs were increasingly required to provide better conditions for both players and spectators. Although the 2012 overhaul granted it a renewed lifespan, the stadium nonetheless remained limited in capacity and in its ability to host major events—particularly as Morocco moved toward organizing continental and international tournaments.

The decisive moment came in 2024, when the stadium's demolition officially began as part of a nationwide project to upgrade the country's sports infrastructure. The decision was directly tied to the Kingdom's preparations to host the 2025 Africa Cup of Nations and the 2025 FIFA U-17 Women's World Cup in the same year, necessitating the construction of a venue built to modern standards and endowed with an architectural identity befitting the capital. By the end of 2025, the stadium emerged in its new form, ready to host its first matches within the African qualifiers for the 2026 World Cup.

== Football stadium specifications ==
The stadium is located in Nahda district within the urban fabric of the capital. It was conceived as an "urban stadium" integrated into the surrounding built environment, moving away from the older model of sports facilities isolated behind walls. Its entrances, exits, circulation routes, and surrounding areas were all arranged in a way that makes the stadium a seamless part of the city's daily life.

Today, the stadium accommodates 22,000 spectators distributed across two stands designed to ensure clear sightlines from every seat. The design eliminated the athletics track, bringing spectators closer to the pitch, while slightly elevating the first row above ground level to enhance viewing quality. The stands have been fitted with foldable seats in the colors of the national flag, giving the terraces a strong and harmonious visual presence.

The pitch features natural grass with standard dimensions (105 × 68 meters) and is equipped with advanced drainage and lighting systems that meet the requirements of continental competitions. The stadium also incorporates a modern lighting system, large display screens, and an advanced audio setup to enhance the spectator experience.

In its new form, the stadium has been transformed into a multi-facility complex that includes dedicated areas for guests and VIPs, press and media rooms, service and technical zones, as well as circulation paths designed to manage crowd flow efficiently. The stands are fully covered, offering protection from weather conditions and ensuring a comfortable viewing environment.

The exterior design features a distinctive architectural façade blending Moroccan authenticity with modern technology. The architects incorporated locally rooted materials, such as glazed ceramic, employed in a contemporary manner. The result is a structure that rises prominently within Rabat's skyline, presenting a modern architectural image that preserves the spirit and heritage of the place.

The reconstruction of the stadium formed part of a comprehensive national project to prepare Morocco's infrastructure for hosting the 2025 Africa Cup of Nations and the FIFA U-17 Women's World Cup. Thanks to its advanced technical specifications, the stadium is now capable of hosting international and continental matches, in addition to serving as the permanent home ground of Fath Union Sport.

== Tenants and events ==
=== 2025 Africa Cup of Nations ===
Date	Local time	Team No. 1	Result	Team No. 2	Round
24 December 2025	16:00	Algeria	3–0	Sudan	Group E
28 December 2025	18:30	Algeria	1–0	Burkina Faso	Group E
31 December 2025	17:00	Equatorial Guinea	1–3	Algeria	Group E
6 January 2026	17:00	Algeria	1–0 (a.e.t.)	DR Congo	Round of 16

=== 2026 FIFA World Cup qualifying – CAF second round ===
Team 1	Score	Team 2
Semi-finals
Nigeria	4–1 (a.e.t.)	Gabon
Cameroon	0–1	DR Congo
Final
Nigeria	1–1 (a.e.t.) (3–4 p)	DR Congo

== See also ==
- List of football stadiums in Morocco
- List of African stadiums by capacity
- List of association football stadiums by capacity
