= 2025 Africa Cup of Nations qualification =

Tournament details
- Dates: 20 March – 19 November 2024
- Teams: 52 (from 1 confederation)

Tournament statistics
- Matches played: 151
- Goals scored: 331 (2.19 per match)
- Top scorer(s): (Morocco) Brahim Díaz (7 goals)

The 2025 Africa Cup of Nations qualification matches were organised by the Confederation of African Football (CAF) to decide the participating teams of the 2025 Africa Cup of Nations in Morocco, the 35th edition of the international men's football championship of Africa. The qualification began with the preliminary round, which ran from 20 to 26 March 2024, and concluded with the group stage, which was played in September, October and November, all in 2024. A total of 24 teams qualified to play in the final tournament, including automatically-qualified hosts Morocco.

== Entrants ==
All CAF member associations entered the competition, except Eritrea and Seychelles, who were excluded from the qualifiers. The seeding was based on the FIFA World Ranking from 15 February 2024, with teams ranked 1st to 44th received a bye to the qualifying group stage, while the teams ranked 45th to 52nd had to participate in the preliminary round.

The preliminary round draw was held on 20 February 2024, 14:00 CAT (UTC+2) at the CAF headquarters in Cairo, Egypt.

For the first time since their suspensions, Kenya and Zimbabwe made their phased returns to the qualifying stage.

From the February 2024 FIFA World Rankings
Bye to group stage	Participating in preliminary round
1. Morocco (12; hosts); 2. Senegal (17); 3. Nigeria (28); 4. Egypt (36); 5. Ivory Coast (39); 6. Tunisia (41); 7. Algeria (43); 8. Mali (47); 9. Cameroon (51); 10. South Africa (58); 11. Burkina Faso (61); 12. DR Congo (63); 13. Cape Verde (65); 14. Ghana (67); 15. Guinea (76); 16. Equatorial Guinea (79); 17. Gabon (84); 18. Zambia (87); 19. Uganda (92); 20. Angola (93); 21. Benin (98); 22. Mauritania (106); 23. Namibia (107); 24. Madagascar (109); 25. Mozambique (110); 26. Kenya (111); 27. Congo (112); 28. Togo (116); 29. Guinea-Bissau (118); 30. Tanzania (119); 31. Libya (120); 32. Comoros (121); 33. Malawi (122); 34. Zimbabwe (124); 35. Sierra Leone (126); 36. Sudan (127); 37. Niger (128); 38. Central African Republic (129); 39. Gambia (130); 40. Rwanda (133); 41. Burundi (140); 42. Ethiopia (145); 43. Botswana (146); 44. Lesotho (148)	45. Eswatini (149); 46. Liberia (152); 47. South Sudan (166); 48. Mauritius (177); 49. Chad (181); 50. São Tomé and Príncipe (191); 51. Djibouti (192); 52. Somalia (198)

== Schedule ==
The schedule of the qualifying tournament was as follows.

Round	Matchday	Dates	Matches
Preliminary round	First leg	20–22 March 2024	Team 1 vs. Team 2
Preliminary round	Second leg	26 March 2024	Team 2 vs. Team 1
Group stage	Matchday 1	4–10 September 2024	Team 1 vs. Team 2, Team 3 vs. Team 4
Group stage	Matchday 2	4–10 September 2024	Team 2 vs. Team 3, Team 4 vs. Team 1
Group stage	Matchday 3	10–15 October 2024	Team 1 vs. Team 3, Team 2 vs. Team 4
Group stage	Matchday 4	10–15 October 2024	Team 3 vs. Team 1, Team 4 vs. Team 2
Group stage	Matchday 5	13–19 November 2024	Team 2 vs. Team 1, Team 4 vs. Team 3
Group stage	Matchday 6	13–19 November 2024	Team 3 vs. Team 2, Team 1 vs. Team 4

== Preliminary round ==
The eight teams were split into four ties which were played in home-and-away two-legged format.

Team 1	Agg.	Team 2	1st leg	2nd leg
Somalia	2–5	Eswatini	0–3	2–2
São Tomé and Príncipe	1–1 (a)	South Sudan	1–1	0–0
Chad	3–1	Mauritius	1–0	2–1
Djibouti	0–2	Liberia	0–2	0–0

== Group stage ==
=== Draw ===
The group stage draw took place on 4 July 2024 at 14:30 (UTC+2) in Johannesburg, South Africa. The 48 national teams involved were divided into twelve groups of four each, which consisted of the 44 teams that entered directly, in addition to the four winners of the preliminary round, and were seeded into four pots of twelve each based on the June 2024 FIFA World Rankings (shown in parentheses).

Teams in bold qualified for the final tournament.

Pot 1	Pot 2	Pot 3	Pot 4
**Morocco** (12; hosts); **Senegal** (18); **Egypt** (36); **Ivory Coast** (37); **Nigeria** (38); **Tunisia** (41); **Algeria** (44); **Cameroon** (49); **Mali** (50); **South Africa** (59); **DR Congo** (61); Ghana (64)	Cape Verde (65); **Burkina Faso** (67); Guinea (77); **Gabon** (83); **Equatorial Guinea** (89); **Zambia** (90); **Benin** (91); **Angola** (92); **Uganda** (94); Namibia (97); **Mozambique** (103); Madagascar (104)	Kenya (108); Mauritania (112); Congo (113); **Tanzania** (114); Guinea-Bissau (115); Libya (118); **Comoros** (119); Togo (120); **Sudan** (121); Sierra Leone (122); Malawi (125); Central African Republic (127)	Niger (128); **Zimbabwe** (129); Rwanda (131); Gambia (132); Burundi (140); Liberia (142); Ethiopia (143); **Botswana** (145); Lesotho (149); Eswatini (154); South Sudan (167); Chad (178)

=== Tiebreakers ===
The teams were ranked according to points (3 points for a win, 1 point for a draw, 0 points for a loss). If tied on points, tiebreakers were applied in the following order (Regulations Article 14):

1. Points in head-to-head matches among tied teams;
2. Goal difference in head-to-head matches among tied teams;
3. Goals scored in head-to-head matches among tied teams;
4. Away goals scored in head-to-head matches among tied teams;
5. If more than two teams were tied, and after applying all head-to-head criteria above, a subset of teams were still tied, all head-to-head criteria above were reapplied exclusively to this subset of teams;
6. Goal difference in all group matches;
7. Goals scored in all group matches;
8. Away goals scored in all group matches;
9. Drawing of lots

=== Group A ===
Pos	Team	Pld	W	D	L	GF	GA	GD	Pts	Qualification	Comoros	Tunisia	Gambia	Madagascar
1	Comoros	6	3	3	0	7	4	+3	**12**	Final tournament	—	1–1	1–1	1–0
2	Tunisia	6	3	1	2	7	6	+1	**10**	Final tournament	0–1	—	0–1	1–0
3	Gambia	6	2	2	2	6	6	0	**8**		1–2	1–2	—	1–0
4	Madagascar	6	0	2	4	4	8	−4	**2**		1–1	2–3	1–1	—

Source: CAF

=== Group B ===
Pos	Team	Pld	W	D	L	GF	GA	GD	Pts	Qualification	Morocco	Gabon	Lesotho	Central African Republic
1	Morocco (Note: Morocco had already qualified for the final tournament as the host nation.)	6	6	0	0	26	2	+24	**18**	Final tournament	—	4–1	7–0	5–0
2	Gabon	6	3	1	2	7	9	−2	**10**	Final tournament	1–5	—	0–0	2–0
3	Lesotho	6	1	1	4	2	13	−11	**4**		0–1	0–2	—	1–0
4	Central African Republic	6	1	0	5	3	14	−11	**3**		0–4	0–1	3–1	—

Source: CAF

=== Group C ===
Pos	Team	Pld	W	D	L	GF	GA	GD	Pts	Qualification	Egypt	Botswana	Mauritania	Cape Verde
1	Egypt	6	4	2	0	12	2	+10	**14**	Final tournament	—	1–1	2–0	3–0
2	Botswana	6	2	2	2	4	7	−3	**8**	Final tournament	0–4	—	1–1	1–0
3	Mauritania	6	2	1	3	3	6	−3	**7**		0–1	1–0	—	1–0
4	Cape Verde	6	1	1	4	3	7	−4	**4**		1–1	0–1	2–0	—

Source: CAF

=== Group D ===
Pos	Team	Pld	W	D	L	GF	GA	GD	Pts	Qualification	Nigeria	Benin	Rwanda	Libya
1	Nigeria	6	3	2	1	9	3	+6	**11**	Final tournament	—	3–0	1–2	1–0
2	Benin	6	2	2	2	7	7	0	**8 (Note: Head-to-head points: Benin 3, Rwanda 3. Head-to-head goal difference: Benin +2, Rwanda –2.)**	Final tournament	1–1	—	3–0	2–1
3	Rwanda	6	2	2	2	5	7	−2	**8**		0–0	2–1	—	0–1
4	Libya	6	1	2	3	3	7	−4	**5**		0–3 (Note: Nigeria were awarded a 3–0 win after the match did not take place: upon their arrival in Libya, the Nigerian team were stranded at the airport for over 12 hours, with their federation ultimately refusing to play the match before flying the team back home.)	0–0	1–1	—

Source: CAF

=== Group E ===
Pos	Team	Pld	W	D	L	GF	GA	GD	Pts	Qualification	Algeria	Equatorial Guinea	Togo	Liberia
1	Algeria	6	5	1	0	16	2	+14	**16**	Final tournament	—	2–0	5–1	5–1
2	Equatorial Guinea	6	2	2	2	5	8	−3	**8**	Final tournament	0–0	—	2–2	1–0
3	Togo	6	1	2	3	7	10	−3	**5**		0–1	3–0	—	1–1
4	Liberia	6	1	1	4	4	12	−8	**4**		0–3	1–2	1–0	—

Source: CAF

=== Group F ===
Pos	Team	Pld	W	D	L	GF	GA	GD	Pts	Qualification	Angola	Sudan	Niger	Ghana
1	Angola	6	4	2	0	7	2	+5	**14**	Final tournament	—	2–1	2–0	1–1
2	Sudan	6	2	2	2	4	6	−2	**8**	Final tournament	0–0	—	1–0	2–0
3	Niger	6	2	1	3	7	6	+1	**7**		0–1	4–0	—	1–1
4	Ghana	6	0	3	3	3	7	−4	**3**		0–1	0–0	1–2	—

Source: CAF

=== Group G ===
Pos	Team	Pld	W	D	L	GF	GA	GD	Pts	Qualification	Zambia	Côte d'Ivoire	Sierra Leone	Chad
1	Zambia	6	4	1	1	7	4	+3	**13**	Final tournament	—	1–0	3–2	0–0
2	Ivory Coast	6	4	0	2	12	3	+9	**12**	Final tournament	2–0	—	4–1	4–0
3	Sierra Leone	6	1	2	3	5	10	−5	**5**		0–2	1–0	—	0–0
4	Chad	6	0	3	3	1	8	−7	**3**		0–1	0–2	1–1	—

Source: CAF

=== Group H ===
Pos	Team	Pld	W	D	L	GF	GA	GD	Pts	Qualification	Democratic Republic of the Congo	Tanzania	Guinea	Ethiopia
1	DR Congo	6	4	0	2	7	3	+4	**12**	Final tournament	—	1–0	1–0	1–2
2	Tanzania	6	3	1	2	5	4	+1	**10**	Final tournament	0–2	—	1–0	0–0
3	Guinea	6	3	0	3	9	5	+4	**9**		1–0	1–2	—	4–1
4	Ethiopia	6	1	1	4	3	12	−9	**4**		0–2	0–2	0–3	—

Source: CAF

=== Group I ===
Pos	Team	Pld	W	D	L	GF	GA	GD	Pts	Qualification	Mali	Mozambique	Guinea-Bissau	Eswatini
1	Mali	6	4	2	0	10	1	+9	**14**	Final tournament	—	1–1	1–0	6–0
2	Mozambique	6	3	2	1	9	5	+4	**11**	Final tournament	0–1	—	2–1	1–1
3	Guinea-Bissau	6	1	2	3	4	6	−2	**5**		0–0	1–2	—	1–0
4	Eswatini	6	0	2	4	2	13	−11	**2**		0–1	0–3	1–1	—

Source: CAF

=== Group J ===
Pos	Team	Pld	W	D	L	GF	GA	GD	Pts	Qualification	Cameroon	Zimbabwe	Kenya	Namibia
1	Cameroon	6	4	2	0	8	2	+6	**14**	Final tournament	—	2–1	4–1	1–0
2	Zimbabwe	6	2	3	1	6	4	+2	**9**	Final tournament	0–0	—	1–1	3–1
3	Kenya	6	1	3	2	4	7	−3	**6**		0–1	0–0	—	0–0
4	Namibia	6	0	2	4	2	7	−5	**2**		0–0	0–1	1–2	—

Source: CAF

=== Group K ===
Pos	Team	Pld	W	D	L	GF	GA	GD	Pts	Qualification	South Africa	Uganda	Republic of the Congo	South Sudan
1	South Africa	6	4	2	0	16	5	+11	**14**	Final tournament	—	2–2	5–0	3–0
2	Uganda	6	4	1	1	8	5	+3	**13**	Final tournament	0–2	—	2–0	1–0
3	Congo	6	1	1	4	4	12	−8	**4**		1–1	0–1	—	1–0
4	South Sudan	6	1	0	5	6	12	−6	**3**		2–3	1–2	3–2	—

Source: CAF
Rules for classification: Tiebreakers

=== Group L ===
Pos	Team	Pld	W	D	L	GF	GA	GD	Pts	Qualification	Senegal	Burkina Faso	Burundi	Malawi
1	Senegal	6	5	1	0	10	1	+9	**16**	Final tournament	—	1–1	2–0	4–0
2	Burkina Faso	6	3	1	2	10	7	+3	**10**	Final tournament	0–1	—	4–1	3–1
3	Burundi	6	1	1	4	4	11	−7	**4 (Note: Head-to-head points: Burundi 4, Malawi 1.)**		0–1	0–2	—	0–0
4	Malawi	6	1	1	4	6	11	−5	**4**		0–1	3–0	2–3	—

Source: CAF

== Goalscorers ==
There were 331 goals scored in 151 matches, for an average of 2.19 goals per match.

7 goals

- (Morocco) Brahim Díaz

6 goals

- (Guinea) Serhou Guirassy

4 goals

- (Algeria) Amine Gouiri
- (Egypt) Trézéguet
- (Zambia) Kennedy Musonda

3 goals

- (Cameroon) Vincent Aboubakar
- (Cape Verde) Ryan Mendes
- (Ivory Coast) Oumar Diakité
- (Ivory Coast) Jean-Philippe Krasso
- (Mali) Kamory Doumbia
- (Mali) Dorgeles Nene
- (Morocco) Youssef En-Nesyri
- (Morocco) Soufiane Rahimi
- (Mozambique) Stanley Ratifo
- (Rwanda) Innocent Nshuti
- (Senegal) Habib Diarra
- (Senegal) Sadio Mané
- (South Africa) Teboho Mokoena

2 goals

- (Algeria) Mohamed Amoura
- (Algeria) Houssem Aouar
- (Algeria) Saïd Benrahma
- (Algeria) Baghdad Bounedjah
- (Angola) Mabululu
- (Angola) Felício Milson
- (Angola) Zini
- (Benin) Andréas Hountondji
- (Benin) Steve Mounié
- (Burkina Faso) Dango Ouattara
- (Burkina Faso) Lassina Traoré
- (Central African Republic) Louis Mafouta
- (Chad) Mahamat Thiam
- (Comoros) Youssouf M'Changama
- (Comoros) Rafiki Saïd
- (Republic of the Congo) Christopher Ibayi
- (Democratic Republic of the Congo) Meschak Elia
- (Egypt) Ibrahim Adel
- (Egypt) Mohamed Salah
- (Equatorial Guinea) Luis Nlavo
- (Eswatini) Sabelo Ndzinisa
- (Gabon) Pierre-Emerick Aubameyang
- (Gabon) Shavy Babicka
- (The Gambia) Musa Barrow
- (Ivory Coast) Franck Kessié
- (Liberia) William Gibson
- (Liberia) Mohammed Sangare
- (Mali) Yves Bissouma
- (Mali) El Bilal Touré
- (Morocco) Eliesse Ben Seghir
- (Morocco) Abde Ezzalzouli
- (Morocco) Azzedine Ounahi
- (Morocco) Ismael Saibari
- (Morocco) Hakim Ziyech
- (Mozambique) Geny Catamo
- (Niger) Ousseini Badamassi
- (Niger) Oumar Sako
- (Niger) Daniel Sosah
- (Nigeria) Ademola Lookman
- (Nigeria) Victor Osimhen
- (Somalia) Mohamed Awad
- (South Africa) Oswin Appollis
- (South Africa) Lyle Foster
- (South Africa) Patrick Maswanganyi
- (South Africa) Thalente Mbatha
- (South Africa) Iqraam Rayners
- (South Sudan) Data Elly
- (South Sudan) Ebon Ezibon
- (Tanzania) Simon Msuva
- (Tanzania) Feisal Salum
- (Togo) Yaw Annor
- (Togo) Kévin Denkey
- (Tunisia) Ali Abdi
- (Uganda) Denis Omedi
- (Zimbabwe) Walter Musona

1 goal

- (Algeria) Ramy Bensebaini
- (Algeria) Riyad Mahrez
- (Algeria) Aïssa Mandi
- (Algeria) Adem Zorgane
- (Angola) Randy Nteka
- (Benin) Hassane Imourane
- (Benin) Junior Olaitan
- (Benin) Mohamed Tijani
- (Botswana) Gilbert Baruti
- (Botswana) Omaatla Kebatho
- (Botswana) Tumisang Orebonye
- (Botswana) Thabang Sesinyi
- (Burkina Faso) Hassane Bandé
- (Burkina Faso) Sacha Bansé
- (Burkina Faso) Ousseni Bouda
- (Burkina Faso) Issoufou Dayo
- (Burkina Faso) Mohamed Konaté
- (Burkina Faso) Bertrand Traoré
- (Burundi) Mokono Eldhino
- (Burundi) Jean-Claude Girumugisha
- (Burundi) Bienvenue Kanakimana
- (Cameroon) Christian Bassogog
- (Cameroon) Boris Enow
- (Cameroon) Martin Hongla
- (Cameroon) Bryan Mbeumo
- (Cameroon) Georges-Kévin Nkoudou
- (Central African Republic) Goduine Koyalipou
- (Chad) Ousmane Hissein
- (Chad) Amine Hiver
- (Republic of the Congo) Mons Bassouamina
- (Republic of the Congo) Chandrel Massanga
- (Comoros) Yacine Bourhane
- (Comoros) Myziane Maolida
- (Comoros) Faïz Selemani
- (Democratic Republic of the Congo) Dylan Batubinsika
- (Democratic Republic of the Congo) Théo Bongonda
- (Democratic Republic of the Congo) Edo Kayembe
- (Democratic Republic of the Congo) Fiston Mayele
- (Egypt) Mostafa Fathi
- (Egypt) Omar Marmoush
- (Egypt) Taher Mohamed
- (Egypt) Ramy Rabia
- (Ethiopia) Kenean Markneh
- (Ethiopia) Mohammednur Nasir
- (Equatorial Guinea) Jannick Buyla
- (Equatorial Guinea) Dorian Jr.
- (Equatorial Guinea) Iban Salvador
- (Eswatini) Justice Figuareido
- (Eswatini) Bongwa Matsebula
- (Eswatini) Thubelihle Mavuso
- (Eswatini) Lindo Mkhonta
- (Eswatini) Kwakhe Thwala
- (Gabon) Denis Bouanga
- (Gabon) Rody Effaghe
- (Gabon) Guélor Kanga
- (The Gambia) Abdoulie Ceesay
- (The Gambia) Alassana Jatta
- (The Gambia) Yankuba Minteh
- (The Gambia) Ali Sowe
- (Ghana) Jerry Afriyie
- (Ghana) Jordan Ayew
- (Ghana) Alidu Seidu
- (Guinea-Bissau) Mama Baldé
- (Guinea-Bissau) Beto
- (Guinea-Bissau) Burá
- (Guinea-Bissau) Carlos Mané
- (Guinea) Mohamed Bayo
- (Guinea) Seydouba Cissé
- (Guinea) Abdoulaye Touré
- (Ivory Coast) Simon Adingra
- (Ivory Coast) Emmanuel Agbadou
- (Ivory Coast) Vakoun Issouf Bayo
- (Ivory Coast) Nicolas Pépé
- (Kenya) Duke Abuya
- (Kenya) John Avire
- (Kenya) Jonah Ayunga
- (Kenya) Michael Olunga
- (Lesotho) Neo Mokhachane
- (Lesotho) Sera Motebang
- (Liberia) Oscar Dorley
- (Liberia) Sampson Dweh
- (Libya) Faisal Al Badri
- (Libya) Subhi Al-Dhawi
- (Libya) Fahd Saad Mohamed
- (Madagascar) Ibrahim Amada
- (Madagascar) Carolus Andriamatsinoro
- (Madagascar) Clément Couturier
- (Malawi) Lloyd Aaron
- (Malawi) Chawanangwa Kawonga
- (Malawi) Richard Mbulu
- (Malawi) Gabadinho Mhango
- (Malawi) Lanjesi Nkhoma
- (Malawi) Zeliat Nkhoma
- (Mauritania) Sidi Bouna Amar
- (Mauritania) Aboubakary Koïta
- (Mauritania) Mouhamed Soueid
- (Mauritius) Jérémy Villeneuve
- (Morocco) Ayoub El Kaabi
- (Morocco) Achraf Hakimi
- (Morocco) Jamal Harkass
- (Mozambique) Domingues
- (Mozambique) Elias
- (Mozambique) Guima
- (Mozambique) Bruno Langa
- (Namibia) Godwin Eiseb
- (Namibia) Deon Hotto
- (Niger) Youssouf Oumarou
- (Nigeria) Samuel Chukwueze
- (Nigeria) Fisayo Dele-Bashiru
- (Rwanda) Djihad Bizimana
- (Rwanda) Ange Mutsinzi
- (São Tomé and Príncipe) Luís Leal
- (Senegal) Boulaye Dia
- (Senegal) Pape Gueye
- (Senegal) Nicolas Jackson
- (Senegal) Ismaïla Sarr
- (Sierra Leone) Amadou Bakayoko
- (Sierra Leone) Abu Dumbuya
- (Sierra Leone) Augustus Kargbo
- (Sierra Leone) Alhassan Koroma
- (Sierra Leone) Hindolo Mustapha
- (South Africa) Bathusi Aubaas
- (South Africa) Elias Mokwana
- (South Africa) Thapelo Morena
- (South Sudan) Yohanna Juma
- (South Sudan) Tito Okello
- (South Sudan) Valentino Yuel
- (Sudan) Mohamed Abdelrahman
- (Sudan) Ahmed Al-Tash
- (Sudan) Abo Eisa
- (Sudan) Mustafa Karshoum
- (Tanzania) Mudathir Yahya
- (Togo) Roger Aholou
- (Togo) Thibault Klidjé
- (Togo) Kodjo Fo-Doh Laba
- (Tunisia) Mohamed Ali Ben Romdhane
- (Tunisia) Sayfallah Ltaief
- (Tunisia) Yassine Meriah
- (Tunisia) Hamza Rafia
- (Tunisia) Ferjani Sassi
- (Uganda) Aziz Kayondo
- (Uganda) Rogers Mato
- (Uganda) Bevis Mugabi
- (Uganda) Travis Mutyaba
- (Uganda) Jude Ssemugabi
- (Zambia) Emmanuel Banda
- (Zambia) Kelvin Kampamba
- (Zambia) Kings Kangwa
- (Zimbabwe) Khama Billiat
- (Zimbabwe) Prince Dube
- (Zimbabwe) Terrence Dzvukamanja
- (Zimbabwe) Tawanda Maswanhise

1 own goal

- (Malawi) Chimwemwe Idana (against Burundi)
- (South Sudan) Alfred Leku (against Uganda)
- (Tanzania) Clement Mzize (against DR Congo)
- (Tunisia) Amenallah Memmiche (against Madagascar)

== Qualified teams ==
The following teams qualified for the final tournament.

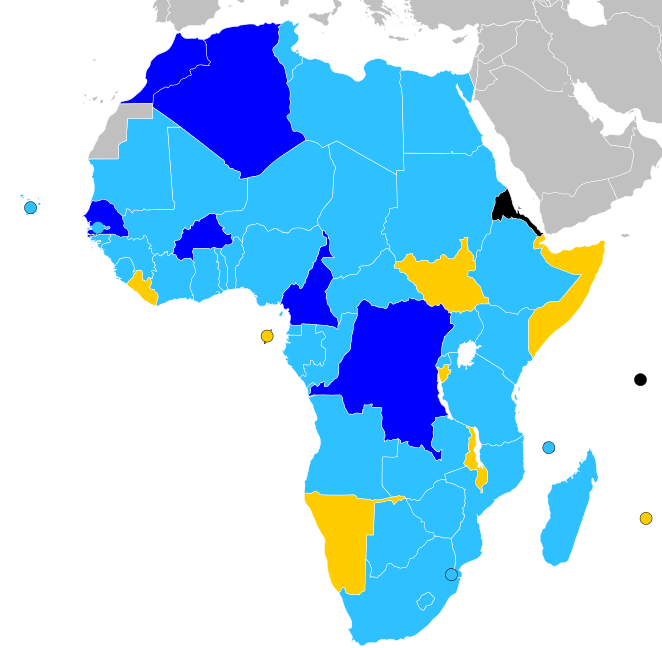
Team qualified Team failed to qualify Team banned or did not enter Not a member of CAF

Team	Qualified as	Qualified on	Previous appearances in Africa Cup of Nations^{1}
Morocco	Hosts / Group B winners	27 September 2023	19 (1972, **1976**, 1978, 1980, 1986, 1988, 1992, 1998, 2000, 2002, 2004, 2006, 2008, 2012, 2013, 2017, 2019, 2021, 2023)
Burkina Faso	Group L runners-up	13 October 2024	13 (1978, 1996, 1998, 2000, 2002, 2004, 2010, 2012, 2013, 2015, 2017, 2021, 2023)
Cameroon	Group J winners	14 October 2024	21 (1970, 1972, 1982, **1984**, 1986, **1988**, 1990, 1992, 1996, 1998, **2000**, **2002**, 2004, 2006, 2008, 2010, 2015, **2017**, 2019, 2021, 2023)
Algeria	Group E winners	14 October 2024	20 (1968, 1980, 1982, 1984, 1986, 1988, **1990**, 1992, 1996, 1998, 2000, 2002, 2004, 2010, 2013, 2015, 2017, **2019**, 2021, 2023)
DR Congo	Group H winners	15 October 2024	20 (1965, **1968**, 1970, 1972, **1974**, 1976, 1988, 1992, 1994, 1996, 1998, 2000, 2002, 2004, 2006, 2013, 2015, 2017, 2019, 2023)
Senegal	Group L winners	15 October 2024	17 (1965, 1968, 1986, 1990, 1992, 1994, 2000, 2002, 2004, 2006, 2008, 2012, 2015, 2017, 2019, **2021**, 2023)
Egypt	Group C winners	15 October 2024	26 (**1957**, **1959**, 1962, 1963, 1970, 1974, 1976, 1980, 1984, **1986**, 1988, 1990, 1992, 1994, 1996, **1998**, 2000, 2002, 2004, **2006**, **2008**, **2010**, 2017, 2019, 2021, 2023)
Angola	Group F winners	15 October 2024	9 (1996, 1998, 2006, 2008, 2010, 2012, 2013, 2019, 2023)
Equatorial Guinea	Group E runners-up	13 November 2024	4 (2012, 2015, 2021, 2023)
Ivory Coast	Group G runners-up	13 November 2024	25 (1965, 1968, 1970, 1974, 1980, 1984, 1986, 1988, 1990, **1992**, 1994, 1996, 1998, 2000, 2002, 2006, 2008, 2010, 2012, 2013, **2015**, 2017, 2019, 2021, **2023**)
Gabon	Group B runners-up	14 November 2024	8 (1994, 1996, 2000, 2010, 2012, 2015, 2017, 2021)
Uganda	Group K runners-up	14 November 2024	7 (1962, 1968, 1974, 1976, 1978, 2017, 2019)
South Africa	Group K winners	14 November 2024	11 (**1996**, 1998, 2000, 2002, 2004, 2006, 2008, 2013, 2015, 2019, 2023)
Tunisia	Group A runners-up	14 November 2024	21 (1962, 1963, 1965, 1978, 1982, 1994, 1996, 1998, 2000, 2002, **2004**, 2006, 2008, 2010, 2012, 2013, 2015, 2017, 2019, 2021, 2023)
Nigeria	Group D winners	14 November 2024	20 (1963, 1976, 1978, **1980**, 1982, 1984, 1988, 1990, 1992, **1994**, 2000, 2002, 2004, 2006, 2008, 2010, **2013**, 2019, 2021, 2023)
Mali	Group I winners	15 November 2024	13 (1972, 1994, 2002, 2004, 2008, 2010, 2012, 2013, 2015, 2017, 2019, 2021, 2023)
Zambia	Group G winners	15 November 2024	18 (1974, 1978, 1982, 1986, 1990, 1992, 1994, 1996, 1998, 2000, 2002, 2006, 2008, 2010, **2012**, 2013, 2015, 2023)
Zimbabwe	Group J runners-up	15 November 2024	5 (2004, 2006, 2017, 2019, 2021)
Comoros	Group A winners	15 November 2024	1 (2021)
Sudan	Group F runners-up	18 November 2024	9 (1957, 1959, 1963, **1970**, 1972, 1976, 2008, 2012, 2021)
Benin	Group D runners-up	18 November 2024	4 (2004, 2008, 2010, 2019)
Tanzania	Group H runners-up	19 November 2024	3 (1980, 2019, 2023)
Botswana	Group C runners-up	19 November 2024	1 (2012)
Mozambique	Group I runners-up	19 November 2024	5 (1986, 1996, 1998, 2010, 2023)

^{1} Bold indicates champions for that year. Italics indicates hosts for that year.
