= 2025 Africa Cup of Nations qualification Group L =

2025 AFCON qualifying group L

Group L of the 2025 Africa Cup of Nations qualification was one of twelve groups that decided the teams which qualified for the 2025 Africa Cup of Nations final tournament in Morocco. The group consisted of four teams: Senegal, Burkina Faso, Malawi and Burundi.

The teams played against each other in a home-and-away round-robin format between September and November 2024.

Senegal and Burkina Faso, the group winners and runners-up respectively, qualified for the 2025 Africa Cup of Nations.

== Standings ==
Pos	Team	Pld	W	D	L	GF	GA	GD	Pts	Qualification	Senegal	Burkina Faso	Burundi	Malawi
1	Senegal	6	5	1	0	10	1	+9	16	Final tournament	—	1–1	2–0	4–0
2	Burkina Faso	6	3	1	2	10	7	+3	10	Final tournament	0–1	—	4–1	3–1
3	Burundi	6	1	1	4	4	11	−7	4 (Note: Head-to-head points: Burundi 4, Malawi 1.)		0–1	0–2	—	0–0
4	Malawi	6	1	1	4	6	11	−5	4		0–1	3–0	2–3	—

Source: CAF
Rules for classification: Tiebreakers

== Matches ==
5 September 2024
15:00 UTC+2

Malawi	2–3	Burundi
Kawonga 31'; L. Nkhoma 75'	Report	Idana 22' (o.g.); Girumugisha 33'; Eldhino 87'

Bingu National Stadium, Lilongwe
Referee: Ibrahim Kalilou Traoré (Ivory Coast)
6 September 2024
19:00 UTC+0

Senegal	1–1	Burkina Faso
Mané 16'	Report	Bouda 90+5'

Diamniadio Olympic Stadium, Dakar
Referee: Sadok Selmi (Tunisia)

9 September 2024
15:00 UTC+2

Burundi	0–1	Senegal
	Report	I. Sarr 71' (pen.)

Bingu National Stadium, Lilongwe (Malawi)
Referee: Mohamed Maarouf Eid Mansour (Egypt)
10 September 2024
19:00 UTC+0

Burkina Faso	3–1	Malawi
L. Traoré 35', 38'; Bandé 60' (pen.)	Report	Z. Nkhoma 80'

Stade du 26 Mars, Bamako (Mali)
Referee: Bouchra Karboubi (Morocco)

10 October 2024
19:00 UTC+0

Burkina Faso	4–1	Burundi
D. Ouattara 33', 44'; Bansé 34'; Dayo 49'	Report	Kanakimana 4'

Alassane Ouattara Stadium, Abidjan (Ivory Coast)
Attendance: 11,241
Referee: Abdulrazg Ahmed (Libya)
11 October 2024
19:00 UTC+0

Senegal	4–0	Malawi
Gueye 35'; Mané 68'; Dia 71'; Jackson 77'	Report

Diamniadio Olympic Stadium, Dakar
Referee: Aklesso Gnama (Togo)

13 October 2024
16:00 UTC+0

Burundi	0–2	Burkina Faso
	Report	Konaté 5'; B. Traoré 90+4' (pen.)

Felix Houphouet Boigny Stadium, Abidjan (Ivory Coast)
Referee: Mohamed Athoumani (Comoros)
15 October 2024
15:00 UTC+2

Malawi	0–1	Senegal
	Report	Mané 90+6'

Bingu National Stadium, Lilongwe
Referee: Bamlak Tessema (Ethiopia)

14 November 2024
14:00 UTC+0

Burundi	0–0	Malawi
	Report

Felix Houphouet Boigny Stadium, Abidjan (Ivory Coast)
Attendance: 313
Referee: Abdoulaye Manet (Guinea)
14 November 2024
18:00 UTC+0

Burkina Faso	0–1	Senegal
	Report	Diarra 83'

Stade du 26 Mars, Bamako (Mali)
Attendance: 15,000
Referee: Mahmoud El Banna (Egypt)

18 November 2024
14:00 UTC+2

Malawi	3–0	Burkina Faso
Mhango 28'; Mbulu 57'; Aaron 62'	Report

Bingu National Stadium, Lilongwe
Referee: Mohamed Diraneh Guedi (Djibouti)
19 November 2024
18:00 UTC+0

Senegal	2–0	Burundi
Diarra 35', 51'	Report

Diamniadio Olympic Stadium, Dakar
Referee: Mustapha Ghorbal (Algeria)

== Goalscorers ==
There were 30 goals scored in 12 matches, for an average of 2.5 goals per match.

3 goals

- (Senegal) Habib Diarra
- (Senegal) Sadio Mané

2 goals

- (Burkina Faso) Dango Ouattara
- (Burkina Faso) Lassina Traoré

1 goal

- (Burkina Faso) Hassane Bandé
- (Burkina Faso) Sacha Bansé
- (Burkina Faso) Ousseni Bouda
- (Burkina Faso) Issoufou Dayo
- (Burkina Faso) Mohamed Konaté
- (Burkina Faso) Bertrand Traoré
- (Burundi) Mokono Eldhino
- (Burundi) Jean-Claude Girumugisha
- (Burundi) Bienvenue Kanakimana
- (Malawi) Lloyd Aaron
- (Malawi) Chawanangwa Kawonga
- (Malawi) Richard Mbulu
- (Malawi) Gabadinho Mhango
- (Malawi) Lanjesi Nkhoma
- (Malawi) Zeliat Nkhoma
- (Senegal) Boulaye Dia
- (Senegal) Pape Gueye
- (Senegal) Nicolas Jackson
- (Senegal) Ismaïla Sarr

1 own goal

- (Malawi) Chimwemwe Idana (against Burundi)
