= Musona =

Musona is a Zimbabwean surname. Notable people with the surname include:

- Knowledge Musona, Zimbabwean footballer
- Walter Musona, Zimbabwean footballer
