= Isaac Wagoina =

Ugandan footballer

Personal information
- Full name: Isaac Wagoina
- Date of birth: 2 February 2000
- Position: Forward

Team information
- Current team: Express FC

Senior career*
Years	Team	Apps	(Gls)
2021–2022	Busoga United		
2023	Busei United		
2023–2024	Express FC	29	(14)
2024–2026	BUL FC	17	(3)
2026–	Express FC		
- * Club domestic league appearances and goals

Isaac Wagoina (born 2 February 2000) is a Ugandan professional footballer who plays as a forward for Uganda Premier League club Express FC

== Early life ==
Wagoina previously played for Busei United, Busoga United FC and Iganga Young before joining Express FC.

== Club career ==
Wagoina joined Busoga United from Iganga Young in February 2021 on a one-and-a-half-year contract. He scored his first goal for Busoga United in a Uganda Cup match against Vipers SC in April 2021.

Wagoina joined Express FC for the 2023/2024 season. He scored 14 goals and provided three assists in 29 league appearances. He finished joint-second in the league's scoring standings with Denis Omedi, behind Shaban Muhammad, who scored 17 goals.

In July 2024, Wagoina joined BUL FC on a two-year contract. During the 2024/2025 Uganda Premier League season, he made 17 appearances and scored three goals for BUL FC.

In January 2025, Wagoina scored twice against Lugazi FC in a Uganda Premier League match. In March 2025, he scored twice in BUL's FC 7–0 Uganda Cup victory over Total FC. On 6 March 2026, Wagoina scored a hat-trick in BUL's 5–1 Uganda Premier League victory over Calvary FC. After his contract with BUL FC expired, Wagoina returned to Express FC in August 2026 on a two-year contract.

== International career ==
Wagoina represented Busoga Province in the FUFA Drum. During the 2023 competition, he scored against West Nile and was named Man of the Match.

He scored seven goals for Busoga Province in the competition and finished as the tournament's leading scorer.

== See also ==
- Denis Omedi
- Shaban Muhammad
- Uganda Premier League
- Express FC
- BUL FC
- FUFA
