= 2025 Africa Cup of Nations qualification Group C =

2025 AFCON qualifying group C

Group C of the 2025 Africa Cup of Nations qualification was one of twelve groups that decided the teams which qualified for the 2025 Africa Cup of Nations final tournament in Morocco. The group consisted of four teams: Egypt, Cape Verde, Mauritania and Botswana.

The teams played against each other in a home-and-away round-robin format between September and November 2024.

Egypt and Botswana, the group winners and runners-up respectively, qualified for the 2025 Africa Cup of Nations.

== Standings ==
Pos	Team	Pld	W	D	L	GF	GA	GD	Pts	Qualification	Egypt	Botswana	Mauritania	Cape Verde
1	Egypt	6	4	2	0	12	2	+10	14	Final tournament	—	1–1	2–0	3–0
2	Botswana	6	2	2	2	4	7	−3	8	Final tournament	0–4	—	1–1	1–0
3	Mauritania	6	2	1	3	3	6	−3	7		0–1	1–0	—	1–0
4	Cape Verde	6	1	1	4	3	7	−4	4		1–1	0–1	2–0	—

Source: CAF
Rules for classification: Tiebreakers

== Matches ==
6 September 2024
22:00 UTC+3

Egypt	3–0	Cape Verde
Rabia 23'; Marmoush 45+1'; Adel 70'	Report

Cairo International Stadium, Cairo
Attendance: 10,000
Referee: Abongile Tom (South Africa)
7 September 2024
16:00 UTC+0

Mauritania	1–0	Botswana
Amar 84'	Report

Cheikha Ould Boïdiya Stadium, Nouakchott
Referee: Daniel Nii Laryea (Ghana)

10 September 2024
18:00 UTC+2

Botswana	0–4	Egypt
	Report	Trézéguet 5', 29'; Salah 56'; M. Fathi 90+4'

Obed Itani Chilume Stadium, Francistown
Referee: Omar Abdulkadir Artan (Somalia)
10 September 2024
18:00 UTC−1

Cape Verde	2–0	Mauritania
Mendes 28' (pen.), 75'	Report

Estádio Nacional de Cabo Verde, Praia
Referee: Mutaz Ibrahim (Libya)

10 October 2024
15:00 UTC−1

Cape Verde	0–1	Botswana
	Report	Orebonye 2'

Estádio Nacional de Cabo Verde, Praia
Referee: Samir Guezzaz (Morocco)
11 October 2024
19:00 UTC+3

Egypt	2–0	Mauritania
Trézéguet 69'; Salah 79'	Report

Cairo International Stadium, Cairo
Referee: Alhadi Allaou Mahamat (Chad)

15 October 2024
16:00 UTC+0

Mauritania	0–1	Egypt
	Report	Adel 85'

Cheikha Ould Boïdiya Stadium, Nouakchott
Referee: Imtehaz Heeralall (Mauritius)
15 October 2024
18:00 UTC+2

Botswana	1–0	Cape Verde
Sesinyi 52'	Report

Obed Itani Chilume Stadium, Francistown
Attendance: 8,000
Referee: Messie Nkounkou (Congo)

15 November 2024
14:00 UTC+2

Botswana	1–1	Mauritania
Baruti 18'	Report	Koïta 7'

Obed Itani Chilume Stadium, Francistown
Referee: Bamlak Tessema Weyesa (Ethiopia)
15 November 2024
14:00 UTC−1

Cape Verde	1–1	Egypt
Mendes 63' (pen.)	Report	T. Mohamed 31'

Estádio Nacional de Cabo Verde, Praia
Referee: Djindo Louis Houngnandande (Benin)

19 November 2024
19:00 UTC+2

Egypt	1–1	Botswana
Trézéguet 15'	Report	Kebatho 8'

30 June Stadium, Cairo
Referee: Abdallah Jammeh (Gambia)
19 November 2024
15:00 UTC+0

Mauritania	1–0	Cape Verde
Soueid 45+4'	Report

Cheikha Ould Boïdiya Stadium, Nouakchott
Referee: Lahlou Benbraham (Algeria)

== Goalscorers ==
There were 22 goals scored in 12 matches, for an average of 1.83 goals per match.

4 goals

- (Egypt) Trézéguet

3 goals

- (Cape Verde) Ryan Mendes

2 goals

- (Egypt) Ibrahim Adel
- (Egypt) Mohamed Salah

1 goal

- (Botswana) Gilbert Baruti
- (Botswana) Omaatla Kebatho
- (Botswana) Tumisang Orebonye
- (Botswana) Thabang Sesinyi
- (Egypt) Mostafa Fathi
- (Egypt) Omar Marmoush
- (Egypt) Taher Mohamed
- (Egypt) Ramy Rabia
- (Mauritania) Sidi Bouna Amar
- (Mauritania) Aboubakary Koïta
- (Mauritania) Mouhamed Soueid
