= Djihad Bizimana =

Rwandan footballer (born 1996)

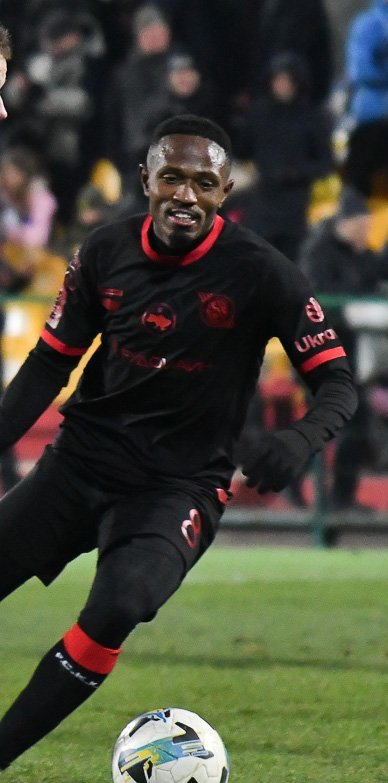
- Bizimana playing for Kryvbas Kryvyi Rih in 2024

Personal information
- Date of birth: 12 December 1996 (age 29)
- Place of birth: Gisenyi, Rwanda
- Height: 1.80 m (5 ft 11 in)
- Position: Midfielder

Team information
- Current team: CS Constantine
- Number: 14

Youth career
- 2011–2014: Etincelles

Senior career*
Years	Team	Apps	(Gls)
2014–2015	Rayon		
2015–2018	APR		
2018–2021	Waasland-Beveren	43	(0)
2021–2023	Deinze	17	(0)
2023–2025	Kryvbas Kryvyi Rih	44	(2)
2025–2026	Al Ahli	5	(1)
2026–	CS Constantine	12	(0)

International career^{‡}
2014	Rwanda U20	2	(0)
2015–	Rwanda	71	(4)
Medal record
Representing Rwanda
Men's football
FIFA Series
Winner	2026 Rwanda
- * Club domestic league appearances and goals as of 5 June 2026 ‡ National team caps and goals as of 27 March 2026

Djihad Bizimana (born 12 December 1996) is a Rwandan professional footballer who plays as a defensive midfielder for Algerian club CS Constantine and the Rwanda national team.

== Club career ==
Bizimana is a youth product of Etincelles since the age of 15, and began his career with Rayon. On 26 April 2018, Bizimana joined Waasland-Beveren from the Rwandan club APR. Bizimana made his professional debut for Waasland-Beveren in a 2-2 Belgian First Division A tie with S.V. Zulte Waregem on 28 July 2018.

On 28 May 2021, he agreed to join Deinze in the Belgian First Division B.

On 26 July 2023, he joined Ukrainian Premier League side FC Kryvbas on a two-year deal. He made his debut for the club in a Premier League match against Oleksandriya, coming on as a substitute in the 46th minute.

On February 6, 2025, Bizimana signed a two-year contract with Al Ahli SC for an undisclosed fee.

On 31 January 2026, he joined Algerian club CS Constantine.

== International career ==
Bizimana progressed through Rwanda's youth national teams before making his debut for the Rwanda senior national team on 29 May 2015 in a friendly match against Zambia.

He scored his first international goal on 10 September 2019 in a 2022 FIFA World Cup African qualifying match against Seychelles. Rwanda won the match 7–0. On 25 March 2024, he scored in stoppage time in a friendly against Madagascar, helping Rwanda secure a 2–0 victory. On 15 October of the same year, he scored from the penalty spot in a 2025 Africa Cup of Nations qualification match against Benin, helping Rwanda to a 2–1 victory.

On 27 March 2026, he scored in the 69th minute of a 2026 FIFA Series match against Grenada, contributing to Rwanda's 4–0 victory.

== Career statistics ==
=== International goals ===
Scores and results list Rwanda's goal tally first.

No.	Date	Venue	Opponent	Score	Result	Competition
1.	10 September 2019	Kigali Pelé Stadium, Kigali, Rwanda	Seychelles	1–0	7–0	2022 FIFA World Cup qualification
2.	25 March 2024	Mahamasina Municipal Stadium, Antananarivo, Madagascar	Madagascar	2–0	2–0	Friendly
3.	15 October 2024	Amahoro Stadium, Kigali, Rwanda	Benin	2–1	2–1	2025 Africa Cup of Nations qualification
4.	27 March 2026	Amahoro Stadium, Kigali, Rwanda	Grenada	3–0	4–0	2026 FIFA Series

== Honours ==
- Rwanda National Football League (1): 2015-16

Rwanda

- CECAFA Cup runner-up:2015
- FIFA Series: 2026
