= 2025 Africa Cup of Nations qualification Group J =

2025 AFCON qualifying group J

Group J of the 2025 Africa Cup of Nations qualification was one of twelve groups that decided the teams which qualified for the 2025 Africa Cup of Nations final tournament in Morocco. The group consisted of four teams: Cameroon, Namibia, Kenya and Zimbabwe.

The teams played against each other in a home-and-away round-robin format between September and November 2024.

Cameroon and Zimbabwe, the group winners and runners-up respectively, qualified for the 2025 Africa Cup of Nations.

== Standings ==
Pos	Team	Pld	W	D	L	GF	GA	GD	Pts	Qualification	Cameroon	Zimbabwe	Kenya	Namibia
1	Cameroon	6	4	2	0	8	2	+6	14	Final tournament	—	2–1	4–1	1–0
2	Zimbabwe	6	2	3	1	6	4	+2	9	Final tournament	0–0	—	1–1	3–1
3	Kenya	6	1	3	2	4	7	−3	6		0–1	0–0	—	0–0
4	Namibia	6	0	2	4	2	7	−5	2		0–0	0–1	1–2	—

Source: CAF
Rules for classification: Tiebreakers

== Matches ==
6 September 2024
16:00 UTC+3

Kenya	0–0	Zimbabwe
	Report

Mandela National Stadium, Kampala (Uganda)
Attendance: 2,000
Referee: Adalbert Diouf (Senegal)
7 September 2024
17:00 UTC+1

Cameroon	1–0	Namibia
Aboubakar 65'	Report

Japoma Stadium, Douala
Referee: Boubou Traoré (Mali)

10 September 2024
19:00 UTC+3

Zimbabwe	0–0	Cameroon
	Report

Mandela National Stadium, Kampala (Uganda)
Attendance: 15,000
Referee: Mahmoud El Banna (Egypt)
10 September 2024
18:00 UTC+2

Namibia	1–2	Kenya
Hotto 90+5'	Report	Avire 58'; Abuya 76'

Orlando Stadium, Johannesburg (South Africa)
Referee: Salisu Basheer (Nigeria)

10 October 2024
15:00 UTC+2

Namibia	0–1	Zimbabwe
	Report	Billiat 34' (pen.)

Orlando Stadium, Johannesburg (South Africa)
Referee: Patrice Mebiame (Gabon)
11 October 2024
17:00 UTC+1

Cameroon	4–1	Kenya
Aboubakar 8' (pen.); Hongla 39'; Mbeumo 43'; Bassogog 55'	Report	Olunga 41'

Japoma Stadium, Douala
Referee: Issa Sy (Senegal)

14 October 2024
16:00 UTC+3

Kenya	0–1	Cameroon
	Report	Enow 63'

Mandela National Stadium, Kampala (Uganda)
Attendance: 0
Referee: Louis Houngnandande (Benin)
14 October 2024
18:00 UTC+2

Zimbabwe	3–1	Namibia
Musona 50', 61' (pen.); Dube 89'	Report	Eiseb 90'

Orlando Stadium, Johannesburg (South Africa)
Referee: Yannick Malala (Congo DR)

13 November 2024
15:00 UTC+2

Namibia	0–0	Cameroon
	Report

Orlando Stadium, Johannesburg (South Africa)
Referee: Jalal Jayed (Morocco)
15 November 2024
17:00 UTC+2

Zimbabwe	1–1	Kenya
Maswanhise 32'	Report	Ayunga 52'

Peter Mokaba Stadium, Polokwane (South Africa)
Referee: Messie Jessie Nkounkou Mvoutou (Congo)

19 November 2024
14:00 UTC+1

Cameroon	2–1	Zimbabwe
Aboubakar 18'; Nkoudou 23'	Report	Dzvukamanja 73'

Ahmadou Ahidjo Stadium, Yaoundé
Attendance: 15,000
Referee: Pacifique Ndabihawenimana (Burundi)
19 November 2024
16:00 UTC+3

Kenya	0–0	Namibia
	Report

Peter Mokaba Stadium, Polokwane (South Africa)
Referee: Pierre Jean Nguiene (Congo)

== Goalscorers ==
There were 20 goals scored in 12 matches, for an average of 1.67 goals per match.

3 goals

- (Cameroon) Vincent Aboubakar

2 goals

- (Zimbabwe) Walter Musona

1 goal

- (Cameroon) Christian Bassogog
- (Cameroon) Boris Enow
- (Cameroon) Martin Hongla
- (Cameroon) Bryan Mbeumo
- (Cameroon) Georges-Kévin Nkoudou
- (Kenya) Duke Abuya
- (Kenya) John Avire
- (Kenya) Jonah Ayunga
- (Kenya) Michael Olunga
- (Namibia) Godwin Eiseb
- (Namibia) Deon Hotto
- (Zimbabwe) Khama Billiat
- (Zimbabwe) Prince Dube
- (Zimbabwe) Terrence Dzvukamanja
- (Zimbabwe) Tawanda Maswanhise
