= 2025 Africa Cup of Nations qualification Group D =

2025 AFCON qualifying group D

Group D of the 2025 Africa Cup of Nations qualification was one of twelve groups that decided the teams which qualified for the 2025 Africa Cup of Nations final tournament in Morocco. The group consisted of four teams: Nigeria, Benin, Libya and Rwanda.

The teams played against each other in a home-and-away round-robin format between September and November 2024.

Nigeria and Benin, the group winners and runners-up respectively, qualified for the 2025 Africa Cup of Nations.

== Standings ==
Pos	Team	Pld	W	D	L	GF	GA	GD	Pts	Qualification	Nigeria	Benin	Rwanda	Libya
1	Nigeria	6	3	2	1	9	3	+6	11	Final tournament	—	3–0	1–2	1–0
2	Benin	6	2	2	2	7	7	0	8 (Note: Head-to-head points: Benin 3, Rwanda 3. Head-to-head goal difference: Benin +2, Rwanda –2.)	Final tournament	1–1	—	3–0	2–1
3	Rwanda	6	2	2	2	5	7	−2	8		0–0	2–1	—	0–1
4	Libya	6	1	2	3	3	7	−4	5		0–3 (Note: Nigeria were awarded a 3–0 win after the match did not take place: upon their arrival in Libya, the Nigerian team were stranded at the airport for over 12 hours, with their federation ultimately refusing to play the match before flying the team back home.)	0–0	1–1	—

Source: CAF
Rules for classification: Tiebreakers

== Matches ==
4 September 2024
18:00 UTC+2

Libya	1–1	Rwanda
Al-Dhawi 16'	Report	Nshuti 47'

Tripoli Stadium, Tripoli
Referee: Ahmad Heeralall (Mauritius)
7 September 2024
17:00 UTC+1

Nigeria	3–0	Benin
Lookman 45+2', 83'; Osimhen 78'	Report

Godswill Akpabio International Stadium, Uyo
Referee: Amin Omar (Egypt)

10 September 2024
15:00 UTC+2

Rwanda	0–0	Nigeria
	Report

Amahoro Stadium, Kigali
Referee: Karim Sabry (Morocco)
10 September 2024
19:00 UTC+0

Benin	2–1	Libya
Mounié 50'; Olaitan 62' (pen.)	Report	Al Badri 9' (pen.)

Felix Houphouet Boigny Stadium, Abidjan (Ivory Coast)
Referee: Abdel Aziz Bouh (Mauritania)

11 October 2024
16:00 UTC+0

Benin	3–0	Rwanda
Mounié 50'; Hountondji 67'; Imourane 70'	Report

Felix Houphouet Boigny Stadium, Abidjan (Ivory Coast)
Referee: Lyes Bekouassa (Algeria)
11 October 2024
17:00 UTC+1

Nigeria	1–0	Libya
Dele-Bashiru 86'	Report

Godswill Akpabio International Stadium, Uyo
Referee: Godfrey Nkhakananga (Malawi)

15 October 2024
18:00 UTC+2

Rwanda	2–1	Benin
Nshuti 70'; Bizimana 75' (pen.)	Report	Hountondji 42'

Amahoro Stadium, Kigali
Referee: Andofetra Rakotojaona (Madagascar)
15 October 2024
21:00 UTC+2

Libya	0–3 Awarded (Note: Nigeria were awarded a 3–0 win and Libya was fined after the match did not take place: following their arrival, the Nigerian team were left stranded at Al Abraq International Airport for more than 12 hours, with the Nigerian federation ultimately refusing to play and having the team fly back home.)	Nigeria
	Report

Benina Martyrs Stadium, Benghazi
Referee: Lenine Rocha (Cape Verde)

14 November 2024
17:00 UTC+2

Rwanda	0–1	Libya
	Report	Saad Mohamed 84'

Amahoro Stadium, Kigali
Referee: Celso Alvação (Mozambique)
14 November 2024
18:00 UTC+0

Benin	1–1	Nigeria
Tijani 16'	Report	Osimhen 81'

Felix Houphouet Boigny Stadium, Abidjan (Ivory Coast)
Referee: Issa Sy (Senegal)

18 November 2024
16:00 UTC+1

Nigeria	1–2	Rwanda
Chukwueze 59'	Report	Mutsinzi 72'; Nshuti 75'

Godswill Akpabio International Stadium, Uyo
Referee: Samir Guezzaz (Morocco)
18 November 2024
17:00 UTC+2

Libya	0–0	Benin
	Report

Tripoli Stadium, Tripoli
Referee: Patrice Milazar (Mauritius)

== Goalscorers ==
There were 21 goals scored in 11 matches, for an average of 1.91 goals per match.

3 goals

- (Rwanda) Innocent Nshuti

2 goals

- (Benin) Andréas Hountondji
- (Benin) Steve Mounié
- (Nigeria) Ademola Lookman
- (Nigeria) Victor Osimhen

1 goal

- (Benin) Hassane Imourane
- (Benin) Junior Olaitan
- (Benin) Mohamed Tijani
- (Libya) Faisal Al Badri
- (Libya) Subhi Al-Dhawi
- (Libya) Fahd Saad Mohamed
- (Nigeria) Samuel Chukwueze
- (Nigeria) Fisayo Dele-Bashiru
- (Rwanda) Djihad Bizimana
- (Rwanda) Ange Mutsinzi
