= 2025 Africa Cup of Nations qualification Group B =

2025 AFCON qualifying group B

Group B of the 2025 Africa Cup of Nations qualification was one of twelve groups that decided which teams which qualified for the 2025 Africa Cup of Nations final tournament in Morocco. The group consisted of four teams: finals hosts Morocco, Gabon, Central African Republic and Lesotho.

The teams played against each other in a home-and-away round-robin format between September and November 2024.

Gabon, the group runners-up, joined Morocco, the group winners and tournament hosts, in qualifying for the 2025 Africa Cup of Nations.

== Standings ==
Pos	Team	Pld	W	D	L	GF	GA	GD	Pts	Qualification	Morocco	Gabon	Lesotho	Central African Republic
1	Morocco (Note: Morocco had already qualified for the final tournament as the host nation.)	6	6	0	0	26	2	+24	18	Final tournament	—	4–1	7–0	5–0
2	Gabon	6	3	1	2	7	9	−2	10	Final tournament	1–5	—	0–0	2–0
3	Lesotho	6	1	1	4	2	13	−11	4		0–1	0–2	—	1–0
4	Central African Republic	6	1	0	5	3	14	−11	3		0–4	0–1	3–1	—

Source: CAF
Rules for classification: Tiebreakers

== Matches ==
5 September 2024
16:00 UTC+1

Central African Republic	3–1	Lesotho
Mafouta 1', 24'; Koyalipou 62'	Report	Sera 56'

Ben M'Hamed El Abdi Stadium, El Jadida (Morocco)
Referee: Youcef Gamouh (Algeria)
6 September 2024
20:00 UTC+1

Morocco	4–1	Gabon
Ziyech 10' (pen.), 26' (pen.); Brahim 59'; El Kaabi 82'	Report	Aubameyang 40' (pen.)

Adrar Stadium, Agadir
Attendance: 38,000
Referee: Dahane Beida (Mauritania)

9 September 2024
19:00 UTC+1

Lesotho	0–1	Morocco
	Report	Brahim 90+3'

Adrar Stadium, Agadir (Morocco)
Referee: Clement Franklin Kpan (Ivory Coast)
10 September 2024
17:00 UTC+1

Gabon	2–0	Central African Republic
Aubameyang 11' (pen.); Babicka 39'	Report

Stade de Franceville, Franceville
Attendance: 8,679
Referee: Mahmood Ali Mahmood Ismail (Sudan)

11 October 2024
20:00 UTC+1

Gabon	0–0	Lesotho
	Report

Stade de Franceville, Franceville
Referee: Adissa Abdul Raphiou Ligali (Benin)
12 October 2024
20:00 UTC+1

Morocco	5–0	Central African Republic
Ezzalzouli 18'; Ounahi 38', 45+2'; Hakimi 45'; Rahimi 71' (pen.)	Report

Honor Stadium, Oujda
Attendance: 19,800
Referee: Alhasan Bass (Gambia)

15 October 2024
15:00 UTC+2

Lesotho	0–2	Gabon
	Report	Babicka 55'; Effaghe 84'

Moses Mabhida Stadium, Durban (South Africa)
Referee: Daniel Nii Laryea (Ghana)
15 October 2024
20:00 UTC+1

Central African Republic	0–4	Morocco
	Report	Ben Seghir 34', 38'; En-Nesyri 50' (pen.); Ezzalzouli 66'

Honor Stadium, Oujda (Morocco)
Attendance: 19,920
Referee: Naby Laye Touré (Guinea)

14 November 2024
14:00 UTC+2

Lesotho	1–0	Central African Republic
Mokhachane 51'	Report

Free State Stadium, Bloemfontein (South Africa)
Referee: Ahmed Arajiga (Tanzania)
15 November 2024
19:00 UTC+1

Gabon	1–5	Morocco
Bouanga 4'	Report	Harkass 17'; Brahim 20', 23'; En-Nesyri 81'; Saibari 90'

Stade de Franceville, Franceville
Attendance: 19,360
Referee: Abongile Tom (South Africa)

18 November 2024
19:00 UTC+1

Morocco	7–0	Lesotho
Brahim 5', 15', 42'; Rahimi 37', 45+2' (pen.); En-Nesyri 68'; Saibari 70'	Report

Honor Stadium, Oujda
Attendance: 33,000
Referee: Jean-Jacques Ndala (DR Congo)
18 November 2024
19:00 UTC+1

Central African Republic	0–1	Gabon
	Report	Kanga 74' (pen.)

Orlando Stadium, Johannesburg (South Africa)
Referee: Dahane Beida (Mauritania)

== Goalscorers ==
There were 38 goals scored in 12 matches, for an average of 3.17 goals per match.

7 goals

- (Morocco) Brahim Díaz

3 goals

- (Morocco) Youssef En-Nesyri
- (Morocco) Soufiane Rahimi

2 goals

- (Central African Republic) Louis Mafouta
- (Gabon) Pierre-Emerick Aubameyang
- (Gabon) Shavy Babicka
- (Morocco) Eliesse Ben Seghir
- (Morocco) Abde Ezzalzouli
- (Morocco) Azzedine Ounahi
- (Morocco) Ismael Saibari
- (Morocco) Hakim Ziyech

1 goal

- (Central African Republic) Goduine Koyalipou
- (Gabon) Denis Bouanga
- (Gabon) Rody Effaghe
- (Gabon) Guélor Kanga
- (Lesotho) Neo Mokhachane
- (Lesotho) Sera Motebang
- (Morocco) Ayoub El Kaabi
- (Morocco) Achraf Hakimi
- (Morocco) Jamal Harkass
