= 2025 Africa Cup of Nations qualification Group H =

2025 AFCON qualifying group H

Group H of the 2025 Africa Cup of Nations qualification was one of twelve groups that decided the teams which qualified for the 2025 Africa Cup of Nations final tournament in Morocco. The group consisted of four teams: DR Congo, Guinea, Tanzania and Ethiopia.

The teams played against each other in a home-and-away round-robin format between September and November 2024.

DR Congo and Tanzania, the group winners and runners-up respectively, qualified for the 2025 Africa Cup of Nations.

== Standings ==
Pos	Team	Pld	W	D	L	GF	GA	GD	Pts	Qualification	Democratic Republic of the Congo	Tanzania	Guinea	Ethiopia
1	DR Congo	6	4	0	2	7	3	+4	12	Final tournament	—	1–0	1–0	1–2
2	Tanzania	6	3	1	2	5	4	+1	10	Final tournament	0–2	—	1–0	0–0
3	Guinea	6	3	0	3	9	5	+4	9		1–0	1–2	—	4–1
4	Ethiopia	6	1	1	4	3	12	−9	4		0–2	0–2	0–3	—

Source: CAF
Rules for classification: Tiebreakers

== Matches ==
4 September 2024
19:00 UTC+3

Tanzania	0–0	Ethiopia
	Report

Benjamin Mkapa Stadium, Dar es Salaam
Referee: Issa Sy (Senegal)
6 September 2024
17:00 UTC+1

DR Congo	1–0	Guinea
Kayembe 27'	Report

Stade des Martyrs, Kinshasa
Referee: Mohamed Adel (Egypt)

9 September 2024
22:00 UTC+3

Ethiopia	0–2	DR Congo
	Report	Bongonda 62'; Mayele 76'

Benjamin Mkapa Stadium, Dar es Salaam (Tanzania)
Referee: Lahlou Benbraham (Algeria)
10 September 2024
16:00 UTC+0

Guinea	1–2	Tanzania
Bayo 57'	Report	Salum 61'; Yahya 88'

Charles Konan Banny Stadium, Yamoussoukro (Ivory Coast)
Referee: Jean Ouattara (Burkina Faso)

10 October 2024
17:00 UTC+1

DR Congo	1–0	Tanzania
Mzize 53' (o.g.)	Report

Stade des Martyrs, Kinshasa
Referee: Hillary Hambaba (Zambia)
12 October 2024
16:00 UTC+0

Guinea	4–1	Ethiopia
Guirassy 18' (pen.), 37', 45+2'; Cissé 48'	Report	Markneh 53'

Alassane Ouattara Stadium, Abidjan (Ivory Coast)
Referee: Clément Kpan (Ivory Coast)

15 October 2024
16:00 UTC+3

Tanzania	0–2	DR Congo
	Report	Elia 87', 90+3'

Benjamin Mkapa Stadium, Dar es Salaam
Referee: Celso Alvação (Mozambique)
15 October 2024
19:00 UTC+0

Ethiopia	0–3	Guinea
	Report	Guirassy 16', 23' (pen.); Touré 19'

Alassane Ouattara Stadium, Abidjan (Ivory Coast)
Referee: Mustapha Ghorbal (Algeria)

16 November 2024
16:00 UTC+1

Ethiopia	0–2	Tanzania
	Report	Msuva 15'; Salum 31'

Stade des Martyrs, Kinshasa (DR Congo)
Referee: Ring Nyier Akech Malong (South Sudan)
16 November 2024
18:00 UTC+0

Guinea	1–0	DR Congo
Guirassy 90+2'	Report

Alassane Ouattara Stadium, Abidjan (Ivory Coast)
Referee: Amin Omar (Egypt)

19 November 2024
16:00 UTC+1

DR Congo	1–2	Ethiopia
Batubinsika 90+2'	Report	Desta 36'; Nasir 90+6'

Stade des Martyrs, Kinshasa
Referee: Leonidas Lenine Da Graca (Cape Verde)
19 November 2024
16:00 UTC+3

Tanzania	1–0	Guinea
Msuva 61'	Report

Benjamin Mkapa Stadium, Dar es Salaam
Referee: Brighton Chimene (Zimbabwe)

== Goalscorers ==
There were 24 goals scored in 12 matches, for an average of 2 goals per match.

6 goals

- (Guinea) Serhou Guirassy

2 goals

- (Democratic Republic of the Congo) Meschak Elia
- (Tanzania) Simon Msuva
- (Tanzania) Feisal Salum

1 goal

- (Democratic Republic of the Congo) Dylan Batubinsika
- (Democratic Republic of the Congo) Théo Bongonda
- (Democratic Republic of the Congo) Edo Kayembe
- (Democratic Republic of the Congo) Fiston Mayele
- (Ethiopia) Bereket Desta
- (Ethiopia) Kenean Markneh
- (Ethiopia) Mohammednur Nasir
- (Guinea) Mohamed Bayo
- (Guinea) Seydouba Cissé
- (Guinea) Abdoulaye Touré
- (Tanzania) Mudathir Yahya

1 own goal

- (Tanzania) Clement Mzize (against DR Congo)
