= 2025 Africa Cup of Nations qualification Group E =

2025 AFCON qualifying group E

Group E of the 2025 Africa Cup of Nations qualification was one of twelve groups that decided the teams which qualified for the 2025 Africa Cup of Nations final tournament in Morocco. The group consisted of four teams: Algeria, Equatorial Guinea, Togo and Liberia.

The teams played against each other in a home-and-away round-robin format between September and November 2024.

Algeria and Equatorial Guinea, the group winners and runners-up respectively, qualified for the 2025 Africa Cup of Nations.

== Standings ==
Pos	Team	Pld	W	D	L	GF	GA	GD	Pts	Qualification	Algeria	Equatorial Guinea	Togo	Liberia
1	Algeria	6	5	1	0	16	2	+14	16	Final tournament	—	2–0	5–1	5–1
2	Equatorial Guinea	6	2	2	2	5	8	−3	8	Final tournament	0–0	—	2–2	1–0
3	Togo	6	1	2	3	7	10	−3	5		0–1	3–0	—	1–1
4	Liberia	6	1	1	4	4	12	−8	4		0–3	1–2	1–0	—

Source: CAF
Rules for classification: Tiebreakers

== Matches ==
5 September 2024
20:00 UTC+1

Algeria	2–0	Equatorial Guinea
Aouar 69'; Gouiri 90+5'	Report

Miloud Hadefi Stadium, Oran
Attendance: 34,850
Referee: Djindo Louis Houngnandande (Benin)
6 September 2024
16:00 UTC+0

Togo	1–1	Liberia
Denkey 78'	Report	Gibson 90+2'

Stade de Kégué, Lomé
Referee: Godfrey Nkhakananga (Malawi)

9 September 2024
17:00 UTC+1

Equatorial Guinea	2–2	Togo
Nlavo 17'; Buyla 75'	Report	Aholou 45'; Laba 90+5'

Estadio de Malabo, Malabo
Referee: Pacifique Ndabihawenimana (Burundi)
10 September 2024
16:00 UTC+0

Liberia	0–3	Algeria
	Report	Gouiri 17'; Zorgane 25'; Bounedjah 80'

Samuel Kanyon Doe Sports Complex, Monrovia
Attendance: 21,754
Referee: Peter Waweru (Kenya)

10 October 2024
20:00 UTC+1

Algeria	5–1	Togo
Benrahma 29', 55' (pen.); Aouar 68'; Gouiri 86'; Amoura 90+5'	Report	Klidjé 11'

19 May 1956 Stadium, Annaba
Attendance: 60,000
Referee: Boubou Traoré (Mali)
11 October 2024
14:00 UTC+1

Equatorial Guinea	1–0	Liberia
Salvador 34' (pen.)	Report

Estadio de Malabo, Malabo
Referee: Ahmed Arajiga (Tanzania)

14 October 2024
16:00 UTC+0

Liberia	1–2	Equatorial Guinea
Gibson 53'	Report	Nlavo 20'; Dorian Jr. 90+4'

Samuel Kanyon Doe Sports Complex, Monrovia
Referee: Brahamou Sadou Ali (Niger)
14 October 2024
16:00 UTC+0

Togo	0–1	Algeria
	Report	Bensebaini 18' (pen.)

Stade de Kégué, Lomé
Referee: Jean-Jacques Ndala (Congo DR)

13 November 2024
15:00 UTC+0

Liberia	1–0	Togo
Sangare 83' (pen.)	Report

Samuel Kanyon Doe Sports Complex, Monrovia
Attendance: 8,543
Referee: Mohamed Athoumani (Comoros)
14 November 2024
13:00 UTC+1

Equatorial Guinea	0–0	Algeria
	Report

Estadio de Malabo, Malabo
Referee: Kalilou Ibrahim Traoré (Ivory Coast)

17 November 2024
16:00 UTC+1

Algeria	5–1	Liberia
Mandi 20'; Mahrez 29'; Bounedjah 64'; Gouiri 74'; Amoura 90+5'	Report	Dweh 6'

Hocine Aït Ahmed Stadium, Tizi Ouzou
Referee: Tanguy Mebiame (Gabon)
17 November 2024
15:00 UTC+0

Togo	3–0	Equatorial Guinea
Annor 29', 87'; Denkey 53'	Report

Stade de Kégué, Lomé
Referee: Hillary Hambaba (Zambia)

== Goalscorers ==
There were 32 goals scored in 12 matches, for an average of 2.67 goals per match.

4 goals

- (Algeria) Amine Gouiri

2 goals

- (Algeria) Mohamed Amoura
- (Algeria) Houssem Aouar
- (Algeria) Saïd Benrahma
- (Algeria) Baghdad Bounedjah
- (Equatorial Guinea) Luis Nlavo
- (Liberia) William Gibson
- (Togo) Yaw Annor
- (Togo) Kévin Denkey

1 goal

- (Algeria) Ramy Bensebaini
- (Algeria) Riyad Mahrez
- (Algeria) Aïssa Mandi
- (Algeria) Adem Zorgane
- (Equatorial Guinea) Jannick Buyla
- (Equatorial Guinea) Dorian Jr.
- (Equatorial Guinea) Iban Salvador
- (Liberia) Sampson Dweh
- (Liberia) Mohammed Sangare
- (Togo) Roger Aholou
- (Togo) Thibault Klidjé
- (Togo) Kodjo Fo-Doh Laba
