= 2025 Africa Cup of Nations qualification Group A =

2025 AFCON qualifying group A

Group A of the 2025 Africa Cup of Nations qualification was one of twelve groups that decided the teams which qualified for the 2025 Africa Cup of Nations final tournament in Morocco. The group consisted of four teams: Tunisia, Madagascar, Comoros and Gambia.

The teams played against each other in a home-and-away round-robin format between September and November 2024.

Comoros and Tunisia, the group winners and runners-up respectively, qualified for the 2025 Africa Cup of Nations.

== Standings ==
Pos	Team	Pld	W	D	L	GF	GA	GD	Pts	Qualification	Comoros	Tunisia	Gambia	Madagascar
1	Comoros	6	3	3	0	7	4	+3	12	Final tournament	—	1–1	1–1	1–0
2	Tunisia	6	3	1	2	7	6	+1	10	Final tournament	0–1	—	0–1	1–0
3	Gambia	6	2	2	2	6	6	0	8		1–2	1–2	—	1–0
4	Madagascar	6	0	2	4	4	8	−4	2		1–1	2–3	1–1	—

Source: CAF
Rules for classification: Tiebreakers

== Matches ==
4 September 2024
16:00 UTC+1

Comoros	1–1	Gambia
M'Changama 37'	Report	Barrow 45+1'

Ben M'Hamed El Abdi Stadium, El Jadida (Morocco)
Referee: Chelanget Sabila (Uganda)
5 September 2024
20:00 UTC+1

Tunisia	1–0	Madagascar
Sassi 90+8'	Report

Hammadi Agrebi Stadium, Tunis
Referee: Jean-Jacques Ndala (DR Congo)

8 September 2024
16:00 UTC+1

Gambia	1–2	Tunisia
Sowe 14'	Report	Abdi 11'; Ben Romdhane 75'

Ben M'Hamed El Abdi Stadium, El Jadida (Morocco)
Attendance: 1,000
Referee: Tewodros Mitiku (Ethiopia)
9 September 2024
16:00 UTC+1

Madagascar	1–1	Comoros
Andriamatsinoro 9'	Report	M'Changama 41'

Hammadi Agrebi Stadium, Tunis (Tunisia)
Referee: Patrice Mebiame (Gabon)

11 October 2024
15:00 UTC+1

Madagascar	1–1	Gambia
Couturier 45+2'	Report	Minteh 90+7'

Larbi Zaouli Stadium, Casablanca (Morocco)
Referee: Chelanget Sabila (Uganda)
11 October 2024
20:00 UTC+1

Tunisia	0–1	Comoros
	Report	Saïd 63'

Hammadi Agrebi Stadium, Tunis
Attendance: 20,000
Referee: Joseph Ogabor (Nigeria)

14 October 2024
15:00 UTC+1

Gambia	1–0	Madagascar
Barrow 62'	Report

Ben M'Hamed El Abdi Stadium, El Jadida (Morocco)
Referee: Bouchra Karboubi (Morocco)
15 October 2024
19:00 UTC+0

Comoros	1–1	Tunisia
Selemani 49'	Report	Meriah 69'

Felix Houphouet Boigny Stadium, Abidjan (Ivory Coast)
Attendance: 1,112
Referee: Tsegay Mogos Teklu (Eritrea)

14 November 2024
17:00 UTC+2

Madagascar	2–3	Tunisia
Memmiche 20' (o.g.); Amada 45+1'	Report	Rafia 6'; Ltaief 40'; Abdi 90+3'

Loftus Versfeld Stadium, Pretoria (South Africa)
Referee: Pierre Atcho (Gabon)
15 November 2024
18:00 UTC+0

Gambia	1–2	Comoros
Sanyang 18'	Report	Saïd 25'; Maolida 90'

Berkane Municipal Stadium, Berkane (Morocco)
Attendance: 150
Referee: Mutaz Ibrahim (Libya)

18 November 2024
20:00 UTC+1

Tunisia	0–1	Gambia
	Report	Ceesay 17'

Hammadi Agrebi Stadium, Tunis
Referee: Daniel Nii Laryea (Ghana)
18 November 2024
16:00 UTC+0

Comoros	1–0	Madagascar
Bourhane 47'	Report

Grand Stade d'Al Hoceima, Al Hoceima (Morocco)
Referee: Mahmood Ali Mahmood Ismail (Sudan)

== Goalscorers ==
There were 24 goals scored in 12 matches, for an average of 2 goals per match.

2 goals

- (Comoros) Youssouf M'Changama
- (Comoros) Rafiki Saïd
- (The Gambia) Musa Barrow
- (Tunisia) Ali Abdi

1 goal

- (Comoros) Yacine Bourhane
- (Comoros) Myziane Maolida
- (Comoros) Faïz Selemani
- (The Gambia) Abdoulie Ceesay
- (The Gambia) Alassana Jatta
- (The Gambia) Yankuba Minteh
- (The Gambia) Ali Sowe
- (Madagascar) Ibrahim Amada
- (Madagascar) Carolus Andriamatsinoro
- (Madagascar) Clément Couturier
- (Tunisia) Mohamed Ali Ben Romdhane
- (Tunisia) Sayfallah Ltaief
- (Tunisia) Yassine Meriah
- (Tunisia) Hamza Rafia
- (Tunisia) Ferjani Sassi

1 own goal

- (Tunisia) Amenallah Memmiche (against Madagascar)
