= 2025 Africa Cup of Nations qualification Group K =

2025 AFCON qualifying group K

Group K of the 2025 Africa Cup of Nations qualification was one of twelve groups that decided the teams which qualified for the 2025 Africa Cup of Nations final tournament in Morocco. The group consisted of four teams: South Africa, Uganda, Congo and South Sudan.

The teams played against each other in a home-and-away round-robin format between September and November 2024.

South Africa and Uganda, the group winners and runners-up respectively, qualified for the 2025 Africa Cup of Nations.

== Standings ==
Pos	Team	Pld	W	D	L	GF	GA	GD	Pts	Qualification	South Africa	Uganda	Republic of the Congo	South Sudan
1	South Africa	6	4	2	0	16	5	+11	14	Final tournament	—	2–2	5–0	3–0
2	Uganda	6	4	1	1	8	5	+3	13	Final tournament	0–2	—	2–0	1–0
3	Congo	6	1	1	4	4	12	−8	4		1–1	0–1	—	1–0
4	South Sudan	6	1	0	5	6	12	−6	3		2–3	1–2	3–2	—

Source: CAF
Rules for classification: Tiebreakers

== Matches ==
5 September 2024
17:00 UTC+1

Congo	1–0	South Sudan
Massanga 12'	Report

Stade Alphonse Massemba-Débat, Brazzaville
Referee: Celso Armindo Alvação (Mozambique)
6 September 2024
18:00 UTC+2

South Africa	2–2	Uganda
Foster 14'; Mbatha 90+5'	Report	Omedi 51'; Mato 53'

Orlando Stadium, Johannesburg
Referee: Pierre Atcho (Gabon)

9 September 2024
19:00 UTC+3

Uganda	2–0	Congo
Kayondo 21'; Ssemugabi 85'	Report

Mandela National Stadium, Kampala
Attendance: 38,000
Referee: Mehrez Malki (Tunisia)
10 September 2024
15:00 UTC+2

South Sudan	2–3	South Africa
Okello 15' (pen.); Yuel 57'	Report	Appollis 17', 45+2'; Mbatha 90+5'

Juba Stadium, Juba
Referee: Joseph Ogabor (Nigeria)

11 October 2024
19:00 UTC+3

Uganda	1–0	South Sudan
Mugabi 47'	Report

Mandela National Stadium, Kampala
Attendance: 38,000
Referee: Kalilou Ibrahim Traoré (Ivory Coast)
11 October 2024
20:00 UTC+2

South Africa	5–0	Congo
Mokoena 12', 27'; Aubaas 37'; Foster 52'; Rayners 78'	Report

Nelson Mandela Bay Stadium, Gqeberha
Referee: Dahane Beida (Mauritania)

15 October 2024
15:00 UTC+2

South Sudan	1–2	Uganda
Juma 21'	Report	Omedi 15'; Leku 66' (o.g.)

Juba Stadium, Juba
Attendance: 9,000
Referee: Ahmed Al Ghandour (Egypt)
15 October 2024
17:00 UTC+1

Congo	1–1	South Africa
Bassouamina 45+3'	Report	Mokwana 33'

Stade Alphonse Massemba-Débat, Brazzaville
Attendance: 20,000
Referee: Mahmood Ali Mahmood Ismail (Sudan)

14 November 2024
14:00 UTC+2

South Sudan	3–2	Congo
Ezibon 31', 45+2'; Elly 84'	Report	Ibayi 26', 35'

Juba Stadium, Juba
Referee: Aklesso Gnama (Togo)
15 November 2024
15:00 UTC+3

Uganda	0–2	South Africa
	Report	Morena 49'; Maswanganyi 89'

Mandela National Stadium, Kampala
Attendance: 38,000
Referee: Alhadi Allaou Mahamat (Chad)

19 November 2024
14:00 UTC+2

South Africa	3–0	South Sudan
Rayners 7'; Maswanganyi 22'; Mokoena 50' (pen.)	Report

Cape Town Stadium, Cape Town
Referee: Adalbert Diouf (Senegal)
19 November 2024
13:00 UTC+1

Congo	0–1	Uganda
	Report	Mutyaba 55'

Stade Alphonse Massemba-Débat, Brazzaville
Attendance: 15,000
Referee: Mohamed Maarouf Eid Mansour (Egypt)

== Goalscorers ==
There were 34 goals scored in 12 matches, for an average of 2.83 goals per match.

3 goals

- (South Africa) Teboho Mokoena

2 goals

- (Republic of the Congo) Christopher Ibayi
- (South Africa) Oswin Appollis
- (South Africa) Lyle Foster
- (South Africa) Patrick Maswanganyi
- (South Africa) Thalente Mbatha
- (South Africa) Iqraam Rayners
- (South Sudan) Ebon Ezibon
- (Uganda) Denis Omedi

1 goal

- (Republic of the Congo) Mons Bassouamina
- (Republic of the Congo) Chandrel Massanga
- (South Africa) Bathusi Aubaas
- (South Africa) Elias Mokwana
- (South Africa) Thapelo Morena
- (South Sudan) Data Elly
- (South Sudan) Yohanna Juma
- (South Sudan) Tito Okello
- (South Sudan) Valentino Yuel
- (Uganda) Aziz Kayondo
- (Uganda) Rogers Mato
- (Uganda) Bevis Mugabi
- (Uganda) Travis Mutyaba
- (Uganda) Jude Ssemugabi

1 own goal

- (South Sudan) Alfred Leku (against Uganda)
