= Rafiki Saïd =

Comorian footballer (born 2000)

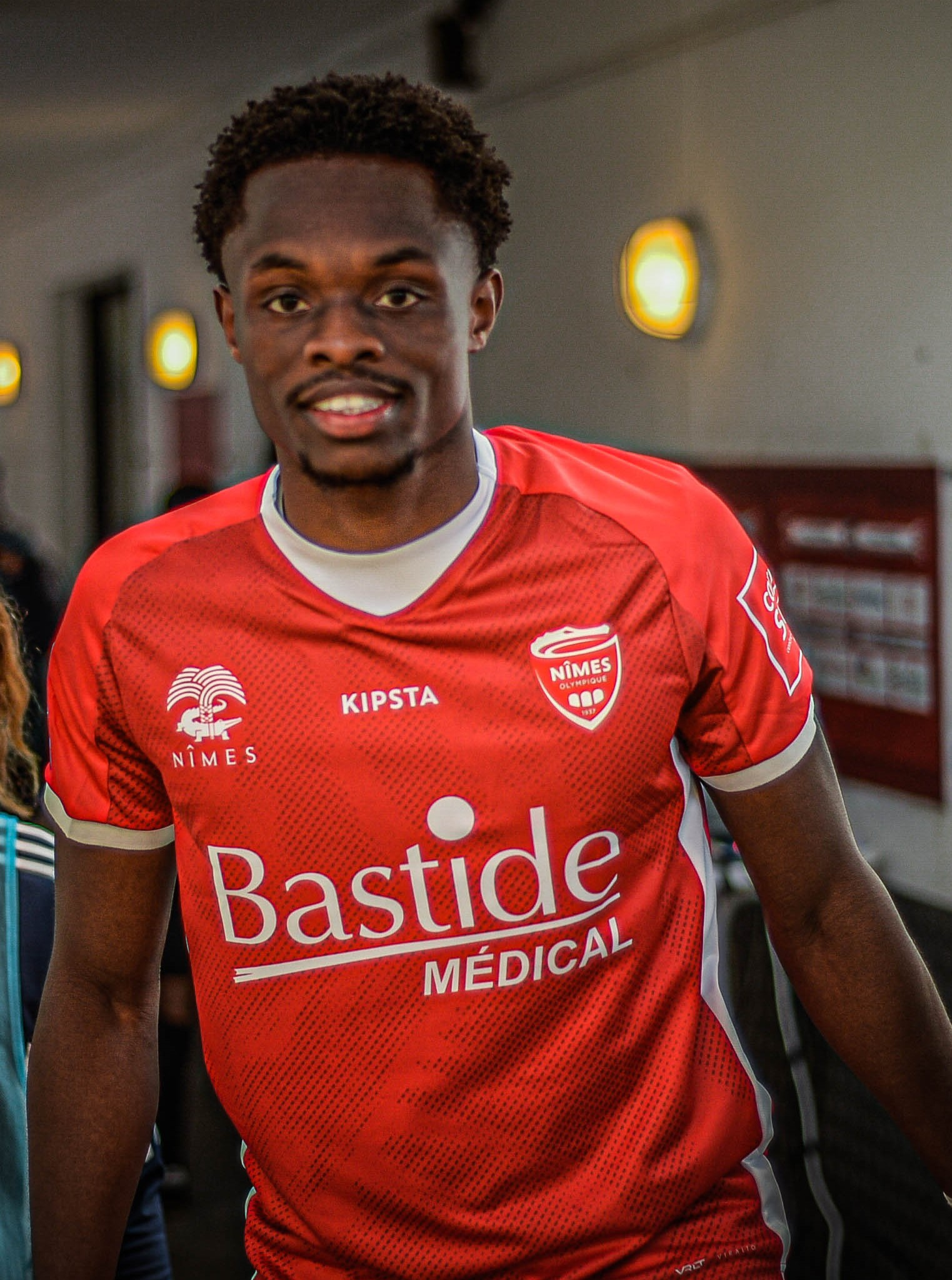
- Saïd in 2022.

Personal information
- Full name: Rafiki Saïd Ahamada
- Date of birth: 15 March 2000 (age 26)
- Place of birth: Samba M'Bodoni, Comoros
- Height: 1.78 m (5 ft 10 in)
- Position: Left winger

Team information
- Current team: Wolverhampton Wanderers
- Number: 19

Youth career
- 2011–2017: Brest

Senior career*
Years	Team	Apps	(Gls)
2017–2022	Brest II	49	(19)
2021	→ Stade Briochin (loan)	15	(2)
2021–2022	Brest	14	(0)
2022–2023	Nîmes	30	(9)
2023–2025	Troyes	68	(17)
2025–2026	Standard Liège	37	(8)
2026–	Wolverhampton Wanderers	9	(1)

International career^{‡}
2023–	Comoros	16	(8)
- * Club domestic league appearances and goals as of 31 May 2026 ‡ National team caps and goals as of 8 October 2025

Rafiki Saïd Ahamada (born 15 March 2000) is a Comorian professional footballer who plays as a left winger for English EFL Championship club Wolverhampton Wanderers and the Comoros national team.

== Club career ==
Saïd joined the youth academy of Brest at the age of 11, and signed his first professional contract on 25 May 2020. He began his senior career with their reserve side, before joining Stade Briochin on loan for the second half of the 2020–21 season in the Championnat National. He returned to Brest in the summer of 2021, where he was promoted to the senior team. He made his professional debut with Brest in a 1–1 Ligue 1 tie with Angers on 12 September 2021.

On 31 August 2022, Saïd signed with Nîmes for one season, with an option to extend for two more seasons. On 22 July 2023, he transferred to Troyes signing a 4-year contract.

On 7 July 2025, Saïd joined Standard Liège in Belgium on a three-season contract.

On 11 July 2026, Saïd joined EFL Championship Club Wolverhampton Wanderers on a 3 year contract with the option for an extra 12 month extension.

== International career ==
Saïd debuted with the Comoros national team in a 4–2 2026 FIFA World Cup qualification win over Central African Republic on 17 November 2023, scoring his side's third goal in his debut.

On 11 December 2025, Saïd was called up to the Comoros squad for the 2025 Africa Cup of Nations.

=== International goals ===
Scores and results list the Comoros' goal tally first.

No.	Date	Venue	Opponent	Score	Result	Competition
1.	17 November 2023	Stade de Moroni, Moroni, Comoros	Central African Republic	3–1	4–2	2026 FIFA World Cup qualification
2.	22 March 2024	Marrakesh Stadium, Marrakesh, Morocco	Uganda	1–0	4–0	Friendly
3.	22 March 2024	Marrakesh Stadium, Marrakesh, Morocco	Uganda	3–0	4–0	Friendly
4.	11 October 2024	Hammadi Agrebi Stadium, Tunis, Tunisia	Tunisia	1–0	1–0	2025 Africa Cup of Nations qualification
5.	15 November 2024	Berkane Municipal Stadium, Berkane, Morocco	Gambia	1–1	2–1	2025 Africa Cup of Nations qualification
6.	25 March 2025	Berkane Municipal Stadium, Berkane, Morocco	Chad	1–0	1–0	2026 FIFA World Cup qualification
7.	9 June 2025	Fadil Vokrri Stadium, Pristina, Kosovo	Kosovo	2–3	2–4	Friendly
8.	8 October 2025	Felix Houphouet Boigny Stadium, Abidjan, Ivory Coast	Madagascar	1–2	1–2	2026 FIFA World Cup qualification
