= Rody Junior Effaghe =

Gabonese footballer (born 2004)

Rody Effaghe
Personal information
- Full name: Rody Junior Effaghe
- Date of birth: 11 April 2004 (age 22)
- Place of birth: Libreville, Gabon
- Height: 1.85 m (6 ft 1 in)
- Position: Striker

Team information
- Current team: Aris Limassol
- Number: 11

Senior career*
| Years | Team | Apps | (Gls) |
| 2022 | Dinamo-Auto Tiraspol | 14 | (3) |
| 2023–2024 | Gomel | 50 | (22) |
| 2024– | Aris Limassol | 41 | (18) |

International career^{‡}
| 2024– | Gabon | 7 | (2) |
- * Club domestic league appearances and goals as of 22 Novemober 2026 ‡ National team caps and goals as of 29 September 2026

Rody Junior Effaghe (born 11 April 2004) is a Gabonese footballer who plays as a striker for Aris Limassol FC. He is capped for Gabon.

== Career ==
Effaghe came to prominence as a prolific goalscorer for FC Gomel in Belarus, being top goalscorer of the 2024 Belarusian Premier League. He was subsequently picked up by Cypriot team Aris Limassol FC.

== Career statistics ==
=== Club ===
As of match played 20 September 2026

Appearances and goals by club, season and competition
| Club | Season | League | | | National cup | | Continental | | Other | | Total | |
| Club | Season | Division | Apps | Goals | Apps | Goals | Apps | Goals | Apps | Goals | Apps | Goals |
|---|---|---|---|---|---|---|---|---|---|---|---|---|
| Dinamo-Auto Tiraspol | 2022–23 | Moldovan Liga | 14 | 3 | — | | — | | — | | 14 | 3 |
| Gomel | 2023 | Belarusian Premier League | 23 | 5 | 0 | 0 | — | | — | | 23 | 5 |
| Gomel | 2024 | Belarusian Premier League | 27 | 17 | 2 | 4 | — | | — | | 29 | 21 |
| Gomel | Total | | 50 | 22 | 2 | 4 | — | | — | | 52 | 26 |
| Aris Limassol | 2024–25 | Cypriot First Division | 3 | 0 | 0 | 0 | — | | — | | 3 | 0 |
| Aris Limassol | 2025–26 | Cypriot First Division | 28 | 9 | 0 | 0 | 2 (Note: Appearances in UEFA Conference League) | 0 | — | | 30 | 9 |
| Aris Limassol | 2021–22 | Cypriot First Division | 4 | 3 | 0 | 0 | — | | — | | 4 | 3 |
| Aris Limassol | Total | | 35 | 12 | 0 | 0 | 2 | 0 | 0 | 0 | 37 | 12 |
| Career total | | | 99 | 37 | 2 | 4 | 2 | 0 | 0 | 0 | 103 | 41 |

=== International ===
As of match played 29 September 2026

Appearances and goals by national team and year
| National team | Year | Apps | Goals |
|---|---|---|---|
| Gabon | 2024 | 5 | 1 |
| Gabon | 2025 | 0 | 0 |
| Gabon | 2026 | 2 | 1 |
| Total | | 7 | 2 |

Scores and results list Gabon's goal tally first, score column indicates score after each Effaghe goal.

List of international goals scored by Rody Junior Effaghe
| No. | Date | Venue | Cap | Opponent | Score | Result | Competition |
|---|---|---|---|---|---|---|---|
| 1 | 15 October 2024 | Moses Mabhida Stadium, Durban, South Africa | 3 | Lesotho | 2–0 | 2–0 | 2025 Africa Cup of Nations qualification |
| 2 | 29 September 2026 | Franceville Stadium, Franceville, Gabon | 7 | Niger | 1–0 | 2–0 | 2027 Africa Cup of Nations qualification |
