= Goduine Koyalipou =

Central African footballer (born 2000)

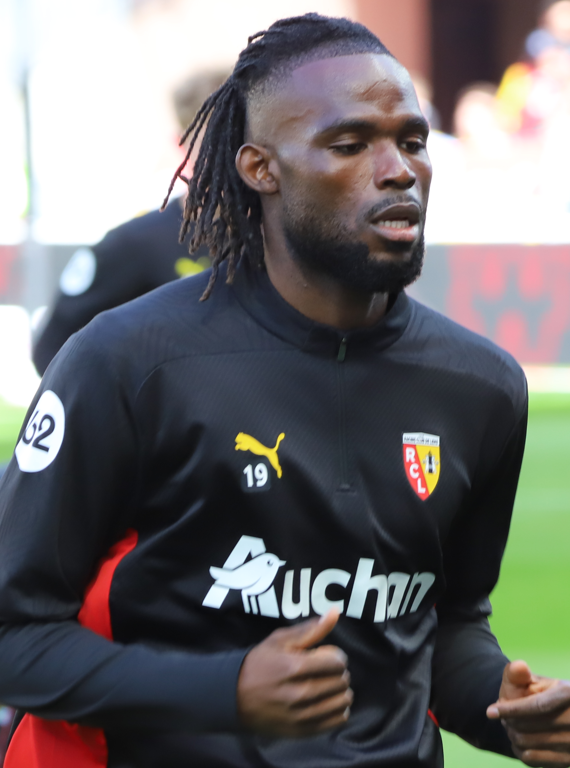
- Koyalipou in 2025 with Lens

Personal information
- Date of birth: 15 February 2000 (age 26)
- Place of birth: Bangui, Central African Republic
- Height: 1.84 m (6 ft 0 in)
- Position: Forward

Team information
- Current team: Kortrijk (on loan from Lens)
- Number: 10

Youth career
- 2008–2017: Niort

Senior career*
Years	Team	Apps	(Gls)
2017–2021	Niort II	20	(9)
2017–2021	Niort	57	(6)
2021–2023	Lausanne-Sport	22	(4)
2022–2023	→ Avranches (loan)	18	(13)
2023–2024	Beveren	30	(16)
2024–2025	CSKA Sofia	16	(14)
2025–	Lens	15	(4)
2025–2026	→ Levante (loan)	11	(1)
2026	→ Angers (loan)	13	(2)
2026–	→ Kortrijk (loan)	0	(0)

International career^{‡}
2018	France U18	3	(2)
2018	France U19	2	(2)
2023–	Central African Republic	11	(3)
- * Club domestic league appearances and goals as of 20 May 2026 ‡ National team caps and goals as of 24 September 2026

Goduine Koyalipou (born 15 February 2000) is a Central African professional footballer who plays as a winger for Belgian Pro League club Kortrijk on loan from French club Lens. A former youth international for France, he plays for the Central African Republic national team.

== Club career ==
Koyalipou moved to France from the Central African Republic as a young child, and joined the Niort academy at the age of 7. Koyalipou made his professional debut for Niort in a 2–1 Ligue 2 loss to Stade de Reims on 8 December 2017. He signed his first professional contract on 26 January 2018.

Koyalipou signed for Swiss club Lausanne-Sport in June 2021. On 4 January 2023, he was loaned to Avranches in Championnat National.

On 17 July 2023, Koyaliou signed a three-year contract with Beveren in Belgium. On 6 August of the following year, he moved to CSKA Sofia where he signed a three-year contract.

On 9 January 2025, Koyalipou returned to France and signed a three-and-a-half-year contract with Lens. On 29 July, he was loaned to La Liga side Levante for one year. He scored his first goal in a 4–0 victory over Girona. On 29 January 2026, Koyalipou moved on a new loan to Angers. On 16 July 2026, he was loaned by Kortrijk in Belgium, with an option to buy.

== International career ==
Born in Central African Republic, Koyalipou represented France internationally. He was called up to the France U18s for a friendly tournament in April 2018. After more than two years without being called to France's youth teams and irregular seasons, in January 2021, Koyalipou expressed his desire to represent Central African Republic. He made his debut for CAR on 7 September 2023 in an Africa Cup of Nations qualifier against Ghana.

== Career statistics ==
=== Club ===
As of match played 17 May 2026

Appearances and goals by club, season and competition
Club	Season	League			National cup (Note: Includes Coupe de France, Swiss Cup, Belgian Cup, Bulgarian Cup)		League cup (Note: Includes Coupe de la Ligue)		Europe		Other		Total	
Club	Season	Division	Apps	Goals	Apps	Goals	Apps	Goals	Apps	Goals	Apps	Goals	Apps	Goals
Niort II	2016–17	Championnat National 3	3	0	–		–		–		–		3	0
Niort II	2017–18	Championnat National 3	14	4	–		–		–		–		14	4
Niort II	2018–19	Championnat National 3	2	2	–		–		–		–		2	2
Niort II	2020–21	Championnat National 3	1	3	–		–		–		–		1	3
Niort II	Total		20	9	–		–		–		–		20	9
Niort	2017–18	Ligue 2	14	3	0	0	0	0	–		–		14	3
Niort	2018–19	Ligue 2	19	3	1	0	0	0	–		–		20	3
Niort	2019–20	Ligue 2	18	0	1	0	2	1	–		–		21	1
Niort	2020–21	Ligue 2	6	0	0	0	0	0	–		–		6	0
Niort	Total		57	6	2	0	2	1	–		–		61	7
Lausanne-Sport	2021–22	Swiss Super League	10	1	1	0	–		–		–		11	1
Lausanne-Sport	2022–23	Swiss Challenge League	12	3	2	0	–		–		–		14	3
Lausanne-Sport	Total		22	4	3	0	–		–		–		25	4
Avranches (loan)	2022–23	Championnat National 3	18	13	1	0	–		–		–		19	13
Beveren	2023–24	Challenger Pro League	30	16	2	1	–		–		–		32	17
CSKA Sofia	2024–25	Bulgarian First League	16	14	1	1	–		–		–		17	15
Lens	2024–25	Ligue 1	15	4	–		–		–		–		15	4
Lens	2026–27	Ligue 1	0	0	0	0	–		0	0	0	0	0	0
Lens	Total		15	4	0	0	–		0	0	0	0	15	4
Levante (loan)	2025–26	La Liga	11	1	3	1	–		–		–		14	2
Angers (loan)	2025–26	Ligue 1	13	2	0	0	–		–		–		13	2
Career total			191	69	10	2	2	1	0	0	0	0	203	71

=== International ===
As of match played 24 September 2026

Appearances and goals by national team and year
National team	Year	Apps	Goals
Central African Republic	2023	3	0
Central African Republic	2024	4	1
Central African Republic	2025	2	0
Central African Republic	2026	2	2
Total		11	3

Scores and results list Central African Republic's goal tally first.

List of international goals scored by Goduine Koyalipou
No.	Date	Venue	Opponent	Score	Result	Competition
1.	5 September 2024	Ben M'Hamed El Abdi Stadium, El Jadida, Morocco	Lesotho	3–1	3–1	2025 Africa Cup of Nations qualification
2.	5 June 2026	Moulay El Hassan Stadium, Rabat, Morocco	Togo	1–0	1–1	Friendly
3.	24 September 2026	Larbi Zaouli Stadium, Casablanca, Morocco	Mauritania	1–1	1–3	2027 Africa Cup of Nations qualification
