= Sacha Bansé =

Burkinabé footballer (born 2001)

Personal information
- Full name: Sacha Jordan Bansé
- Date of birth: 16 March 2001 (age 25)
- Place of birth: Geel, Belgium
- Height: 1.76 m (5 ft 9 in)
- Position: Midfielder

Team information
- Current team: Greuther Fürth
- Number: 6

Youth career
- KVC Gierle
- KFC De Kempen
- Westerlo
- 2015–2016: KV Mechelen
- 2016–2022: Gent

Senior career*
Years	Team	Apps	(Gls)
2022–2023	Standard Liège II	30	(1)
2023–2024	Standard Liège	6	(0)
2023–2024	→ Valenciennes (loan)	26	(0)
2024–	Greuther Fürth	22	(1)

International career^{‡}
2015–2016	Belgium U15	4	(0)
2024–	Burkina Faso	11	(1)
- * Club domestic league appearances and goals as of 28 December 2025 ‡ National team caps and goals as of 23:00, 10 October 2024 (UTC)

Sacha Jordan Bansé (born 16 March 2001) is a professional footballer who plays as a midfielder for 2. Bundesliga club Greuther Fürth. Born in Belgium, he plays for the Burkina Faso national team.

== Club career ==
Bansé is a youth product of the Belgian clubs KVC Gierle, KFC De Kempen, Westerlo, KV Mechelen and Gent. On 16 July 2022, he signed with Standard Liège on a professional contract and was assigned to their reserves. He made his senior debut with Standard Liège in a 3–1 Belgian First Division A loss to Gent on 3 June 2023. On 19 July 2023, he extended his contract with Standard Liège until 2026. On 1 September 2023, he joined the French Ligue 2 club Valenciennes on loan for the remainder of the 2023–24 season.

Bansé joined German 2. Bundesliga club Greuther Fürth on a "long-term" contract in August 2024. The transfer fee paid to Standard Liège was undisclosed.

== International career ==
Bansé was born in Belgium to a Burkinabé father and Belgian mother. He was called up to the Burkina Faso national team for a set of 2023 Africa Cup of Nations qualification matches in June 2023. He debuted with the Burkina Faso national team in a friendly 2–1 loss to Iran on 5 January 2024.

== Career statistics ==
=== Club ===
As of match played 28 February 2025

Appearances and goals by club, season and competition
Club	Season	League			National cup (Note: Includes Belgian Cup, Coupe de France, DFB Pokal)		Other		Total	
Club	Season	Division	Apps	Goals	Apps	Goals	Apps	Goals	Apps	Goals
Standard Liège II	2022–23	Challenger Pro League	30	1	—		—		30	1
Standard Liège	2022–23	Belgian Pro League	1	0	0	0	—		1	0
Standard Liège	2023–24	Belgian Pro League	3	0	0	0	—		3	0
Standard Liège	2024–25	Belgian Pro League	2	0	0	0	—		2	0
Standard Liège	Total		6	0	0	0	—		6	0
Valenciennes (loan)	2023–24	Ligue 2	26	0	4	0	—		30	0
Greuther Fürth	2024–25	2. Bundesliga	21	1	1	0	—		22	1
Career total			83	2	5	0	—		88	2

=== International ===
As of match played 18 November 2024

Appearances and goals by national team and year
National team	Year	Apps	Goals
Burkina Faso	2024	13	1
Total		13	1

Scores and results list Burkina Faso's goal tally first, score column indicates score after each Bansé goal.

List of international goals scored by Sacha Bansé
No.	Date	Venue	Opponent	Score	Result	Competition	Ref.
1	10 October 2024	Alassane Ouattara Stadium, Abidjan, Ivory Coast	Burundi	2–1	4–1	2025 Africa Cup of Nations qualification	
