= Clément Couturier =

Malagasy footballer (born 1993)

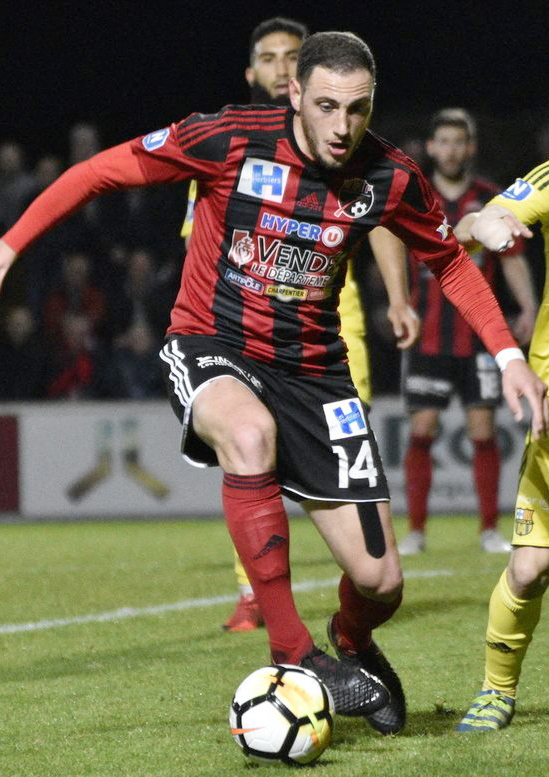

Personal information
- Date of birth: 13 September 1993 (age 33)
- Place of birth: Chaumont, Haute-Marne, France
- Height: 1.83 m (6 ft 0 in)
- Position: Left winger

Team information
- Current team: Mondorf-les-Bains
- Number: 14

Youth career
- Auxerre
- 2012–2014: Dijon

Senior career*
Years	Team	Apps	(Gls)
2014–2015	Montceau	28	(7)
2015–2016	Belfort	31	(0)
2016–2017	Chambly	21	(1)
2017–2018	Les Herbiers	20	(4)
2018–2019	Dudelange	17	(6)
2019–2020	Virton	25	(6)
2021	Bastia-Borgo	15	(2)
2021–2024	Swift Hesperange	75	(13)
2024–2025	Villefranche	19	(3)
2025	Fleury	1	(0)
2025–2026	Thionville	17	(0)
2026–	Mondorf-les-Bains	5	(0)

International career^{‡}
2023–	Madagascar	15	(2)
- * Club domestic league appearances and goals as of 30 August 2026 ‡ National team caps and goals as of 18 June 2025

Clément Couturier (born 13 September 1993) is a Malagasy professional footballer who plays for Luxembourgish club Mondorf-les-Bains. Born in Chaumont, Haute-Marne, he plays for the Madagascar national team.

== Club career ==
Couturier was a youth player at Auxerre before moving to Montceau and Belfort. He also played for Dijon and Chambly.

=== Belfort ===
On 29 May 2015, Belfort announced the signing of Couturier.

=== Chambly ===
On 16 June 2016, Couturier joined French club Chambly.

=== Les Herbiers ===
Couturier played for Les Herbiers as they reached the final of the 2018 Coupe de France, facing his former teammates from Chambly in the semi-final. On 8 May 2018 he played as PSG won 2-0 to clinch the 2017-18 Coupe de France with goals from Edinson Cavani and Giovani Lo Celso.

=== Dudelange ===
Couturier joined Dudelange in the summer of 2018 signing a two-year contract with the option of a third year. He played in the 2018 UEFA Champions League qualifiers against MOL Vidi FC scoring a goal and he played in the Luxembourgers successful run to the UEFA Europa League group stages as they beat CFR Cluj and Legia Warsaw.

=== Argeș Pitești ===
On 2 December 2020, Romanian club Argeș Pitești announced that Couturier had signed for them for the rest of the season. However, the announcement was made prematurely, before the signing of any contract. When he arrived at the club, the contract offer was not the same, so he did not sign and returned to France.

=== Bastia-Borgo ===
On 21 January 2021, Couturier signed for Championnat National side FC Bastia-Borgo.

=== Swift Hesperange ===
On 19 July 2021, he returned to Luxembourg and signed with Swift Hesperange.

=== Villefranche ===
On 19 July 2024, Couturier joined Championnat National club Villefranche.

== International career ==
Born in France, Couturier is of Malagasy descent through a great-grandfather. He was called up to the Madagascar national team for a set of friendlies in October 2023.

=== International goals ===
Scores and results list the Madagascar's goal tally first.

No.	Date	Venue	Opponent	Score	Result	Competition
1	11 October 2024	Larbi Zaouli Stadium, Casablanca, Morocco	Gambia	1–0	1–1	2025 Africa Cup of Nations qualification
2	8 October 2025	Felix Houphouet Boigny Stadium, Abidjan, Ivory Coast	Comoros	1–0	2–1	2026 FIFA World Cup qualification
3	28 March 2026	Bellis Hotel Sports Center, Belek, Turkey	Kyrgyzstan	4–0	5–2	Friendly

== Personal life ==
In 2018, his then girlfriend was a midwifery student in Nancy. His current wife is of DR Congolese and Malagasy descent.

== Honours ==
Les Herbiers

- Coupe de France runner-up: 2017–18
