= Christian Bassogog =

Cameroonian footballer (born 1995)

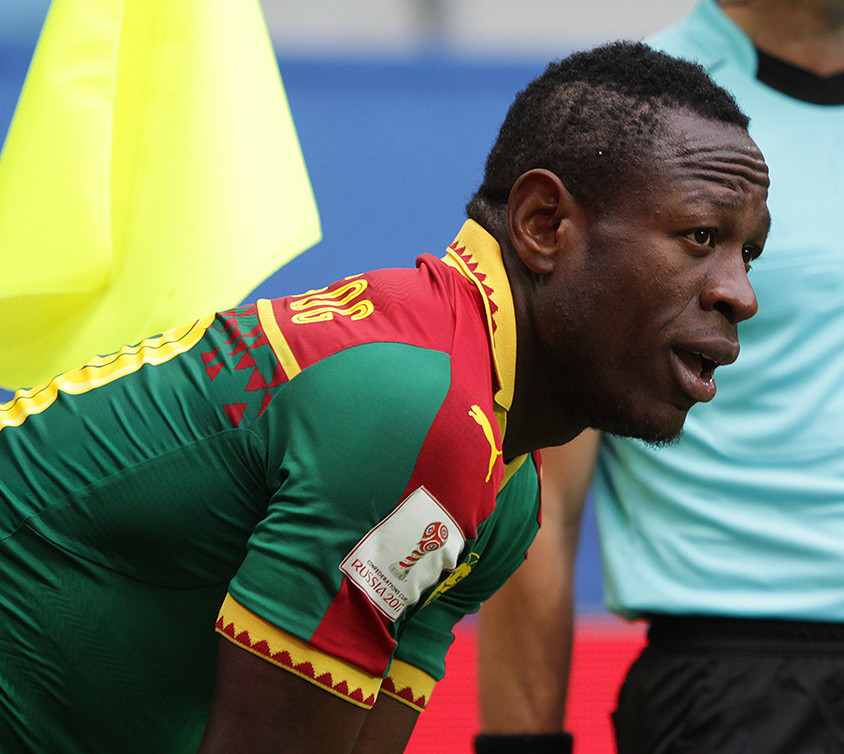
- Bassogog with Cameroon at the 2017 FIFA Confederations Cup

Personal information
- Full name: Christian Mougang Bassogog
- Date of birth: 18 October 1995 (age 31)
- Place of birth: Douala, Cameroon
- Height: 1.78 m (5 ft 10 in)
- Positions: Winger; forward

Team information
- Current team: Al-Faisaly
- Number: 13

Youth career
- –2013: Rainbow

Senior career*
| Years | Team | Apps | (Gls) |
| 2013–2015 | Rainbow | | |
| 2015 | Wilmington Hammerheads | 16 | (0) |
| 2015–2017 | AaB | 30 | (4) |
| 2017–2020 | Henan Jianye | 84 | (26) |
| 2021–2024 | Shanghai Shenhua | 54 | (11) |
| 2024 | Ankaragücü | 16 | (2) |
| 2024–2026 | Al-Okhdood | 61 | (10) |
| 2026– | Al-Faisaly | 3 | (1) |

International career^{‡}
| 2016 | Cameroon U23 | 2 | (0) |
| 2016– | Cameroon | 59 | (8) |
Medal record
Men's football
Representing Cameroon
Africa Cup of Nations
| Winner | 2017 Gabon |
| Third place | 2021 Cameroon |
- * Club domestic league appearances and goals as of 26 August 2026 ‡ National team caps and goals as of 31 December 2025

Christian Mougang Bassogog (born 18 October 1995) is a Cameroonian professional footballer who plays for Al-Faisaly and the Cameroon national team as a right winger or forward.

== Club career ==
=== Rainbow FC ===
Bassogog began his career in his native Cameroon at second division side Rainbow, graduating from the youth system.

=== Wilmington Hammerheads ===
On 29 April 2015, Bassogog joined the United Soccer League club Wilmington Hammerheads, in the United States. Christian played 16 games and made two assists for the American club before he moved to the Danish club AaB. On 28 August, he signed a four-year contract with his new club.

=== AaB ===
On 29 September 2015, Bassogog made his debut for his new club AaB in the Danish Cup against the Aarhus-located team Lystrup IF. He came on the pitch in the second half with a half hour left.

On 11 February 2016, in the Danish Superliga winter break, Bassogog was chosen to play the forward-position in a friendly match against Sioni Bolnisi from Georgia. He scored two goals in the match, and former head coach Lars Søndergaard talked afterwards about, that Bassogog in the future could be used on the forward-position instead of the wing.

On 29 February 2016, he got his debut in the Danish Superliga against Midtjylland. He came on the pitch with 10 minutes left.

Following a string of impressive performances for Cameroon at the 2017 Africa Cup of Nations, AaB sporting director Allan Gaarde commented that Bassogog was the subject of multiple queries regarding potential moves away from AaB in the 2017 January transfer window.

=== Henan Jianye ===
On 19 February 2017, AaB officially announced the departure of Bassogog for a reported fee of 45 million Danish kroner (approx. £5 million) to join the Chinese side Henan Jianye. This was a recording-breaking transfer fee for AaB, surpassing that of Jesper Grønkjær when he signed for the Dutch club Ajax Amsterdam for £3.5 million in October 1997.

On 31 July 2020, Bassogog tested positive for COVID-19 in Guangzhou.

=== Shanghai Shenhua ===
On 26 February 2021, Bassogog signed with Chinese Super League side Shanghai Shenhua.

=== Ankaragücü ===
On 8 February 2024, Bassogog moved to Ankaragücü in Turkey on a 1.5-year contract.

=== Al-Okhdood ===
On 1 September 2024, Bassogog joined Saudi Pro League club Al-Okhdood,

== International career ==
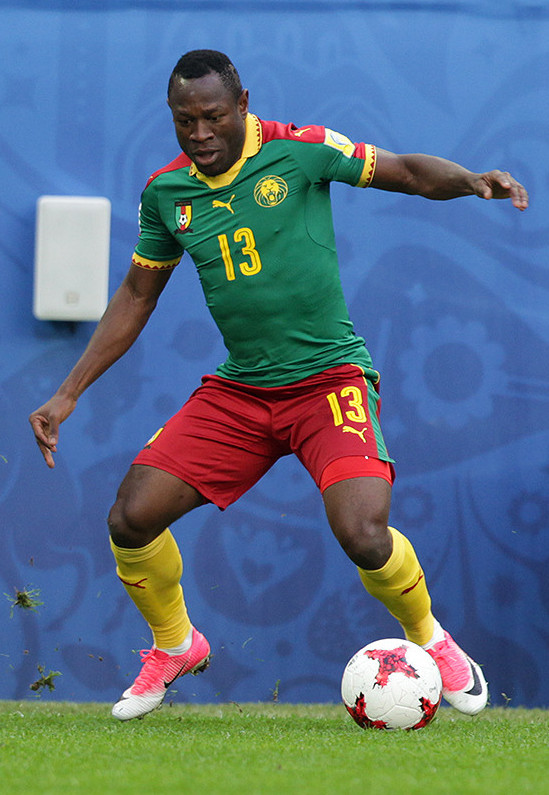
Bassogog playing for Cameroon in June 2017

Christian Bassogog had a stellar 2017 Africa Cup of Nations, scoring once en route to their victory, and was named as the Best Player at AFCON 2017. On 11 November 2022, Bassogog was selected for the 2022 FIFA World Cup. In December 2025, he was appointed national team captain ahead of 2025 Africa Cup of Nations.

== Career statistics ==
=== Club ===
As of match played 23 November 2025

Appearances and goals by club, season and competition
| Club | Season | League | | | National Cup | | Continental | | Other | | Total | |
| Club | Season | Division | Apps | Goals | Apps | Goals | Apps | Goals | Apps | Goals | Apps | Goals |
|---|---|---|---|---|---|---|---|---|---|---|---|---|
| Wilmington Hammerheads | 2015 | USL Championship | 16 | 0 | 1 | 0 | — | | — | | 17 | 0 |
| AaB | 2015–16 | Danish Superliga | 9 | 0 | 2 | 0 | — | | — | | 11 | 0 |
| AaB | 2016–17 | Danish Superliga | 21 | 4 | 0 | 0 | — | | — | | 21 | 4 |
| AaB | Total | | 30 | 4 | 2 | 0 | — | | — | | 32 | 4 |
| Henan Jianye | 2017 | Chinese Super League | 24 | 10 | 0 | 0 | — | | — | | 24 | 10 |
| Henan Jianye | 2018 | Chinese Super League | 27 | 6 | 0 | 0 | — | | — | | 27 | 6 |
| Henan Jianye | 2019 | Chinese Super League | 25 | 8 | 0 | 0 | — | | — | | 25 | 8 |
| Henan Jianye | 2020 | Chinese Super League | 8 | 2 | 1 | 0 | — | | — | | 9 | 2 |
| Henan Jianye | Total | | 84 | 26 | 1 | 0 | — | | — | | 85 | 26 |
| Shanghai Shenhua | 2021 | Chinese Super League | 14 | 4 | 0 | 0 | — | | — | | 14 | 4 |
| Shanghai Shenhua | 2022 | Chinese Super League | 22 | 5 | 0 | 0 | — | | — | | 22 | 5 |
| Shanghai Shenhua | 2023 | Chinese Super League | 18 | 2 | 0 | 0 | — | | — | | 18 | 2 |
| Shanghai Shenhua | Total | | 54 | 11 | 0 | 0 | — | | — | | 54 | 11 |
| Ankaragücü | 2023–24 | Süper Lig | 13 | 2 | 3 | 0 | — | | — | | 16 | 2 |
| Ankaragücü | 2024–25 | TFF First League | 3 | 0 | — | | — | | — | | 3 | 0 |
| Ankaragücü | Total | | 16 | 2 | 3 | 0 | — | | — | | 19 | 2 |
| Al-Okhdood | 2024–25 | Saudi Pro League | 32 | 6 | 0 | 0 | — | | — | | 32 | 6 |
| Al-Okhdood | 2025–26 | Saudi Pro League | 9 | 0 | 1 | 0 | — | | — | | 10 | 0 |
| Al-Okhdood | Total | | 41 | 6 | 1 | 0 | — | | — | | 42 | 6 |
| Career total | | | 241 | 48 | 8 | 0 | 0 | 0 | 0 | 0 | 249 | 48 |

=== International ===
As of match played 31 December 2025

Appearances and goals by national team and year
| National team | Year | Apps | Goals |
|---|---|---|---|
| Cameroon | 2016 | 1 | 0 |
| Cameroon | 2017 | 17 | 2 |
| Cameroon | 2018 | 3 | 2 |
| Cameroon | 2019 | 9 | 1 |
| Cameroon | 2020 | 2 | 0 |
| Cameroon | 2021 | 5 | 2 |
| Cameroon | 2022 | 7 | 0 |
| Cameroon | 2024 | 7 | 1 |
| Cameroon | 2025 | 8 | 0 |
| Total | | 59 | 8 |

Scores and results list Cameroon's goal tally first, score column indicates score after each Bassogog goal.

List of international goals scored by Christian Bassogog
| No. | Date | Venue | Opponent | Score | Result | Competition |
|---|---|---|---|---|---|---|
| 1 | 5 January 2017 | Stade Ahmadou Ahidjo, Yaoundé, Cameroon | DR Congo | 2–0 | 2–0 | Friendly |
| 2 | 2 February 2017 | Stade de Franceville, Franceville, Gabon | Ghana | 2–0 | 2–0 | 2017 Africa Cup of Nations |
| 3 | 25 March 2018 | Jaber Al-Ahmad International Stadium, Kuwait City, Kuwait | Kuwait | 2–0 | 3–1 | Friendly |
| 4 | 25 March 2018 | Jaber Al-Ahmad International Stadium, Kuwait City, Kuwait | Kuwait | 3–0 | 3–1 | Friendly |
| 5 | 23 March 2019 | Stade Ahmadou Ahidjo, Yaoundé, Cameroon | Comoros | 2–0 | 3–0 | 2019 Africa Cup of Nations qualification |
| 6 | 13 November 2021 | Orlando Stadium, Johannesburg, South Africa | Malawi | 3–0 | 4–0 | 2022 FIFA World Cup qualification |
| 7 | 13 November 2021 | Orlando Stadium, Johannesburg, South Africa | Malawi | 4–0 | 4–0 | 2022 FIFA World Cup qualification |
| 8 | 11 October 2024 | Japoma Stadium, Douala, Cameroon | Kenya | 4–1 | 4–1 | 2025 Africa Cup of Nations qualification |

== Honours ==
Shanghai Shenhua

- Chinese FA Cup: 2023

Cameroon

- Africa Cup of Nations: 2017, third place: 2021

Individual

- Africa Cup of Nations Best Player: 2017
- CAF Team of the Tournament: 2017
