= Richard Mbulu =

Malawian footballer

Personal information
- Date of birth: 25 January 1994 (age 32)
- Place of birth: Mangochi, Malawi
- Height: 1.85 m (6 ft 1 in)
- Position: Forward

Team information
- Current team: Al-Najaf SC

Senior career*
Years	Team	Apps	(Gls)
2012–2016	Malawi Armed Forces College		
2017–2018	Costa do Sol	26	(5)
2018	A.D. Sanjoanense	4	(0)
2018–2019	Costa do Sol	20	(2)
2019–2022	Baroka	70	(9)
2022–2023	Al-Najaf SC		
2023–2025	Costa do Sol	37	(14)
2026–	U.D.Songo		

International career^{‡}
2017–	Malawi	48	(7)
- * Club domestic league appearances and goals as of 11 October 2022 ‡ National team caps and goals as of 14 June 2026

Richard Mbulu (born 25 January 1994) is a Malawian professional footballer who plays as a forward for U.D.Songo in Mozambique. He was included in Malawi's squad for the 2021 Africa Cup of Nations.

== Early life ==
Mbulu was born in Mangochi, Malawi.

== Club career ==
Having started his career at Malawi Armed Forces College following his enlistment in the armed forces, he joined Mozambican side Costa do Sol in December 2016. He later moved to Portuguese side A.D. Sanjoanense before returning to Costa do Sol in the summer of 2018. In the summer of 2019, Mbulu signed for South African side Baroka on a three-year deal.

== International career ==
He was called up to the Malawi national football team for the first time in January 2017, and made his debut for them on 10 June 2017 in a 1–0 win against Comoros. He scored his first goal for Malawi on 4 September 2017 in a 1–0 win against Togo. He scored the only goal of a 1–0 win against Uganda which allowed Malawi to qualify for the 2021 Africa Cup of Nations.

=== International goals ===
As of match played 5 September 2025. Malawi score listed first, score column indicates score after each Mbulu goal.

International goals by date, venue, cap, opponent, score, result and competition
No.	Date	Venue	Opponent	Score	Result	Competition
1	4 September 2017	Stade de Kégué, Lomé, Togo	Togo	1–0	1–0	Friendly
2	26 May 2019	King Zwelithini Stadium, Umlazi, South Africa	Seychelles	2–0	3–0	2019 COSAFA Cup
3	4 June 2019	Princess Magogo Stadium, KwaMashu, South Africa	Comoros	1–0	2–1	2019 COSAFA Cup
4	29 March 2021	Kamuzu Stadium, Blantyre, Malawi	Uganda	1–0	1–0	2021 Africa Cup of Nations qualification
5	7 September 2021	Orlando Stadium, Johannesburg, South Africa	Mozambique	1–0	1–0	2022 FIFA World Cup qualification
6	18 November 2024	Bingu National Stadium, Lilongwe, Malawi	Burkina Faso	2–0	3–0	2025 Africa Cup of Nations qualification
7	5 September 2025	Obed Itani Chilume Stadium, Francistown, Botswana	Namibia	1–0	2–1	2026 FIFA World Cup qualification

== Personal life ==
When Mbulu left school, he became a soldier but later decided to pursue a career in football. His father was also a footballer and a soldier.
