= Mudathir Yahya =

Tanzanian footballer

Personal information
- Full name: Mudathir Yahya Abbas
- Date of birth: May 6, 1996 (age 30)
- Place of birth: Jang'ombe, Tanzania
- Height: 1.76 m (5 ft 9 in)
- Position: Central midfielder

Team information
- Current team: Young Africans
- Number: 27

Senior career*
Years	Team	Apps	(Gls)
2012–2022	Azam	126	(25)
2023–	Young Africans	82	(23)

International career^{‡}
- Tanzania U17
2015–	Tanzania	22	(0)
2015–	Zanzibar	9	(1)
- * Club domestic league appearances and goals ‡ National team caps and goals as of 23 March 2019

Mudathir Yahya Abbas (born 6 May 1996) is a Tanzanian professional footballer who plays as a central midfielder for Tanzanian Premier League club Young Africans and the Tanzania national team.

Yahya is a member of both the Tanzania national team and the Zanzibar national team. He appeared for the latter at the 2017 CECAFA Cup, where his side finished runner-up.

== International goals ==
No.	Date	Venue	Opponent	Score	Result	Competition
1.	10 September 2024	Charles Konan Banny Stadium, Yamoussoukro, Ivory Coast	Guinea	2–1	2–1	2025 Africa Cup of Nations qualification
2.	29 March 2026	Kigali Pelé Stadium, Kigali, Rwanda	Macau	2–0	6–0	2026 FIFA Series
