= Bathusi Aubaas =

South African footballer

Personal information
- Full name: Bathusi Jurry Aubaas
- Date of birth: 14 May 1995 (age 31)
- Place of birth: Kuruman, Northern Cape, South Africa
- Position: Midfielder

Team information
- Current team: Mamelodi Sundowns
- Number: 15

Senior career*
Years	Team	Apps	(Gls)
2016–2017	Buya Msuthu		
2017–2018	Free State Stars	0	(0)
2018–2023	TS Galaxy	128	(7)
2023–	Mamelodi Sundowns	35	(0)

International career^{‡}
2023–	South Africa	5	(1)
- * Club domestic league appearances and goals as of 27 March 2026 ‡ National team caps and goals as of 11 October 2024

Bathusi Aubaas (born 14 May 1995) is a South African soccer player who plays as a midfielder for Mamelodi Sundowns in the Premier Soccer League and the South Africa national team.

He made his breakthrough with TS Galaxy in the 2018–19 season. Despite the team playing in the second tier, they won the 2018–19 Nedbank Cup. The club owner bought the first-tier licence of Highlands Park, moving TS Galaxy up one tier. Aubaas subsequently made his first-tier debut in the 2020–21 South African Premier Division.

== Club Career ==
Born in Kuruman, Northern Cape, Aubaas began his youth career with hometown club Kuruman United before joining one of Mamelodi Sundowns' satellite clubs in North West. He subsequently signed for third-tier side Orbit College, who later transferred him to fellow third-division club Buya Msuthu. On 15 August 2017, Aubaas signed his first professional contract with Premier Soccer League club Free State Stars alongside his former Buya Msuthu teammate Mpho Mathekgane. However, he did not make any first-team appearances during the remainder of the 2017–18 season.

With limited opportunities at Free State Stars, Aubaas was loaned to TS Galaxy for the 2018–19 season. Aubaas made his professional debut on the opening matchday on 19 August 2018, featuring in Galaxy's 1–1 home draw against Cape Umoya United. He established himself as a regular in the starting eleven throughout the season, making 23 league appearances. He also featured in six Nedbank Cup matches, including starting in Galaxy's 1–0 victory over Kaizer Chiefs in the final on 18 May 2019.

Following his successful loan spell, Aubaas remained with Galaxy and continued to feature regularly, scoring a career-high six goals in 33 appearances. Aubaas also made his debut in continental competition during the 2019–20 CAF Confederation Cup. He made his African debut on 11 August 2019 in a preliminary-round tie against Seychelles club Saint Louis FC. He subsequently featured in all four matches of Galaxy's continental campaign, which ended with elimination in the second round against Nigerian side Enyimba.

The following season provided Aubaas with an opportunity to return to the Premier Soccer League after TS Galaxy acquired the status of Highlands Park.

At the end of July 2023, Aubaas was sold from TS Galaxy to one of South Africa's three major clubs. TS Galaxy owner Tim Sukazi confirmed the transfer, but not which club was involved. On 2 August 2023, it was announced that the club Aubass signed for was the Mamelodi Sundowns.

== International Career ==
He was called up for South Africa for the 2023 Africa Cup of Nations qualification, where he made his international debut against Morocco. The selection of the relatively unknown Aubaas had its critics, but Aubaas performed well as Morocco was beaten.

On 1 December 2025, Aubaas was called up to the South Africa squad for the 2025 Africa Cup of Nations.

== Career Statistics ==
Scoreds and results listed by South Africa's goal tally first.

No.	Date	Venue	Opponent	Score	Result	Competition
1.	11 October 2024	Nelson Mandela Bay Stadium, Gqeberha, South Africa	Congo	3–0	5–0	2025 Africa Cup of Nations qualification

== Honours ==
- CAF Champions League: 2026
