= Mohamed Soueïd =

Mauritanian footballer (born 1991)

Personal information
- Full name: Soueïd Mohamed
- Date of birth: 31 December 1991 (age 34)
- Place of birth: Teyarett, Mauritania
- Height: 1.80 m (5 ft 11 in)
- Position: Midfielder

Senior career*
Years	Team	Apps	(Gls)
–2020	FC Tevragh-Zeina		
2020–2021	FC Nouadhibou	4	(0)
2021–2022	FC Tevragh-Zeina		
2022–2023	Al-Hudood		
2023–2024	Al-Talaba		
2024	Al-Hudood SC	9	(1)
2025	Al-Kahrabaa SC	24	(3)

International career^{‡}
2017–	Mauritania	29	(4)
- * Club domestic league appearances and goals as of 3 July 2025 ‡ National team caps and goals as of 19 November 2024

Soueïd Mohamed (born 30 December 1991) is a Mauritanian professional footballer who plays as a midfielder.

== International career ==
=== International goals ===
No	Date	Venue	Opponent	Score	Result	Competition
1	6 December 2021	Al Janoub Stadium, Al Wakrah, Qatar	Syria	1–0	2–1	2021 FIFA Arab Cup
2	26 March 2022	Cheikha Ould Boïdiya Stadium, Nouakchott, Mauritania	Mozambique	1–0	2–1	Friendly
3	28 March 2023	Cheikha Ould Boïdiya Stadium, Nouakchott, Mauritania	DR Congo	1–1	1–1/0–3 vo	2023 Africa Cup of Nations qualification
4	19 November 2024	Cheikha Ould Boïdiya Stadium, Nouakchott, Mauritania	Cape Verde	1–0	1–0	2025 Africa Cup of Nations qualification
