= Innocent Nshuti =

Rwandan footballer

Personal information
- Date of birth: 31 January 1998 (age 28)
- Place of birth: Ruhengeri, Rwanda
- Position: Forward

Senior career*
Years	Team	Apps	(Gls)
2016–2018	A.P.R.		
2018–2019	Stade Tunisien	3	(0)
2019–2023	A.P.R.		
2024	One Knoxville	12	(0)
2025	Sabail	15	(1)
2025–2026	ES Zarzis	16	(6)

International career^{‡}
2017–	Rwanda	23	(6)
- * Club domestic league appearances and goals as of 5 January 2026 ‡ National team caps and goals as of 20:30, 18 November 2024 (UTC)

Innocent Nshuti (born 31 January 1998) is a Rwandan professional footballer who plays as a forward.

After helping A.P.R. to four straight Rwanda Premier League titles, Nshuti moved to American USL League One side One Knoxville in January 2024. He was released by Knoxville following their 2024 season.

== Career statistics ==
=== Club ===
As of 1 June 2019

Appearances and goals by club, season and competition
Club	Season	League			Cup		Continental		Other		Total	
Club	Season	Division	Apps	Goals	Apps	Goals	Apps	Goals	Apps	Goals	Apps	Goals
Stade Tunisien	2018–19	CLP-1	3	0	0	0	0	0	0	0	3	0
Career total			3	0	0	0	0	0	0	0	3	0

=== International ===
As of matches played 18 November 2024

Appearances and goals by national team and year
National team	Year	Apps	Goals
Rwanda	2017	7	2
Rwanda	2021	2	0
Rwanda	2023	4	1
Rwanda	2024	10	3
Total		23	6

Scores and results list Rwanda's goal tally first, score column indicates score after each Nshuti goal.

List of international goals scored by Innocent Nshuti
No.	Date	Venue	Opponent	Score	Result	Competition
1	7 August 2017	Nyamirambo Regional Stadium, Kigali, Rwanda	Sudan	1–0	2–1	Friendly
2	9 December 2017	Kenyatta Stadium, Machakos, Kenya	Tanzania	1–0	2–1	2017 CECAFA Cup
3	21 November 2023	Stade Huye, Butare, Rwanda	South Africa	1–0	2–0	2026 FIFA World Cup qualification
4	4 September 2024	Tripoli Stadium, Tripoli, Libya	Libya	1–1	1–1	2025 Africa Cup of Nations qualification
5	15 October 2024	Amahoro Stadium, Kigali, Rwanda	Benin	1–1	2–1	2025 Africa Cup of Nations qualification
6	18 November 2024	Godswill Akpabio International Stadium, Uyo, Nigeria	Nigeria	2–1	2–1	2025 Africa Cup of Nations qualification
