= Gilbert Baruti =

Motswana footballer

Personal information
- Date of birth: 16 March 1992 (age 34)
- Place of birth: Ratholo, Botswana
- Height: 1.68 m (5 ft 6 in)
- Position: Midfielder

Team information
- Current team: Jwaneng Galaxy

Senior career*
Years	Team	Apps	(Gls)
2014–2015	Police XI		
2015–	Jwaneng Galaxy		

International career^{‡}
2018–	Botswana	14	(1)
- * Club domestic league appearances and goals as of 3 October 2021 ‡ National team caps and goals as of 15 November 2024

Gilbert Baruti (born 16 March 1992) is a Motswana footballer who plays as a midfielder for Jwaneng Galaxy.
