= Chimwemwe Idana =

Malawian footballer

Personal information
- Date of birth: 7 September 1998 (age 28)
- Place of birth: Blantyre, Malawi
- Height: 1.60 m (5 ft 3 in)
- Position: Midfielder

Team information
- Current team: Silver Strikers
- Number: 44

Senior career*
Years	Team	Apps	(Gls)
2016–2023	Nyasa Big Bullets		
2023–	Silver Strikers		

International career^{‡}
2019–	Malawi	48	(0)
- * Club domestic league appearances and goals as of 23:29, 3 January 2022 (UTC) ‡ National team caps and goals as of 23:19, 15 January 2022 (UTC)

Chimwemwe Idana (born 7 September 1998) is a Malawian footballer who plays as a midfielder for TNM Super League club Silver Strikers and the Malawi national team. He was included in Malawi's squad for the 2021 Africa Cup of Nations. A very talented and skillful player, he thrives both in a more central midfield area as a box to box midfielder and in a more advanced attacking role where he utilizes his signature short passes with strikers and wingers to create chances for his teammates and score goals for himself. He is renowned for his eye for goals and powerful shot with either foot, having scored crucial goals for his first senior team, FCB Nyasa Big Bullets, where he won the majority of his senior honours. In the 2024 TNM Super League season, he was instrumental in the end of the 11-year wait for a league title for capital city giants, Silver Strikers FC, as they won the championship with two games to spare.
