= Walter Musona =

Zimbabwean footballer (born 1995)

Personal information
- Full name: Walter Tatenda Musona
- Date of birth: 12 December 1995 (age 30)
- Place of birth: Norton, Zimbabwe
- Position: Left winger

Team information
- Current team: Scottland
- Number: 10

Senior career*
| Years | Team | Apps | (Gls) |
| 2013–2014 | Motor Action F.C. | | |
| 2014–2015 | F.C. Platinum | | |
| 2015–2016 | FK Senica | 0 | (0) |
| 2016–2017 | F.C. Platinum | | |
| 2017– | Polokwane City | 60 | (11) |
| – | Simba Bhora | | |
| 2025– | Scottland | | |

International career^{‡}
- Zimbabwe U17
- Zimbabwe U20
- Zimbabwe U23
| 2014– | Zimbabwe | 13 | (4) |
- * Club domestic league appearances and goals as of 29 September 2019 ‡ National team caps and goals as of 14 October 2024

Walter Tatenda Musona (born 12 December 1995) is a Zimbabwean footballer who plays as a forward for Scottland and the Zimbabwe national football team. Walter made his transfer from his former Club, FC Platinum at the end of 2023 Zimbabwean season to join his new Shamva based Club.

He has also been a member of the national under-17, under-20 and under-23 squads.

Musona won the Soccer Star of the Year in 2021–22 and 2024.

== International career ==
=== International goals ===
Scores and results list Zimbabwe's goal tally first.

| No. | Date | Venue | Opponent | Score | Result | Competition |
|---|---|---|---|---|---|---|
| 1. | 19 November 2023 | Stade Huye, Butare, Rwanda | Nigeria | 1–1 | 1–1 | 2026 FIFA World Cup qualification |
| 2. | 23 March 2024 | Bingu National Stadium, Lilongwe, Malawi | Zambia | 2–2 | 2–2 (6–5 p) | 2024 Four Nations Football Tournament |
| 3. | 14 October 2024 | Orlando Stadium, Johannesburg, South Africa | Namibia | 1–0 | 3–1 | 2025 Africa Cup of Nations qualification |
| 4. | 14 October 2024 | Orlando Stadium, Johannesburg, South Africa | Namibia | 2–0 | 3–1 | 2025 Africa Cup of Nations qualification |

== Personal life ==
He is the youngest of six children, one of his older brothers being fellow Zimbabwe international Knowledge Musona. He is also Catholic.
