= Chawanangwa Kawonga =

Malawian footballer

Personal information
- Date of birth: 5 January 1995 (age 31)
- Place of birth: Mzuzu, Malawi
- Height: 1.70 m (5 ft 7 in)
- Position: Midfielder

Team information
- Current team: TS Sporting

Senior career*
Years	Team	Apps	(Gls)
2012–2014	Silver Strikers		
2015–2017	FC Chibuto		
2018–2019	CD Costa do Sol	50	(14)
2019–	TS Sporting	20	(2)

International career^{‡}
2015–	Malawi	35	(5)
- * Club domestic league appearances and goals as of 7 August 2021 ‡ National team caps and goals as of 8 September 2025

Chawanangwa Kawonga (born 5 January 1995) is a Malawian football midfielder who currently plays for TS Sporting.
