= Denis Omedi =

Ugandan footballer (born 1994)

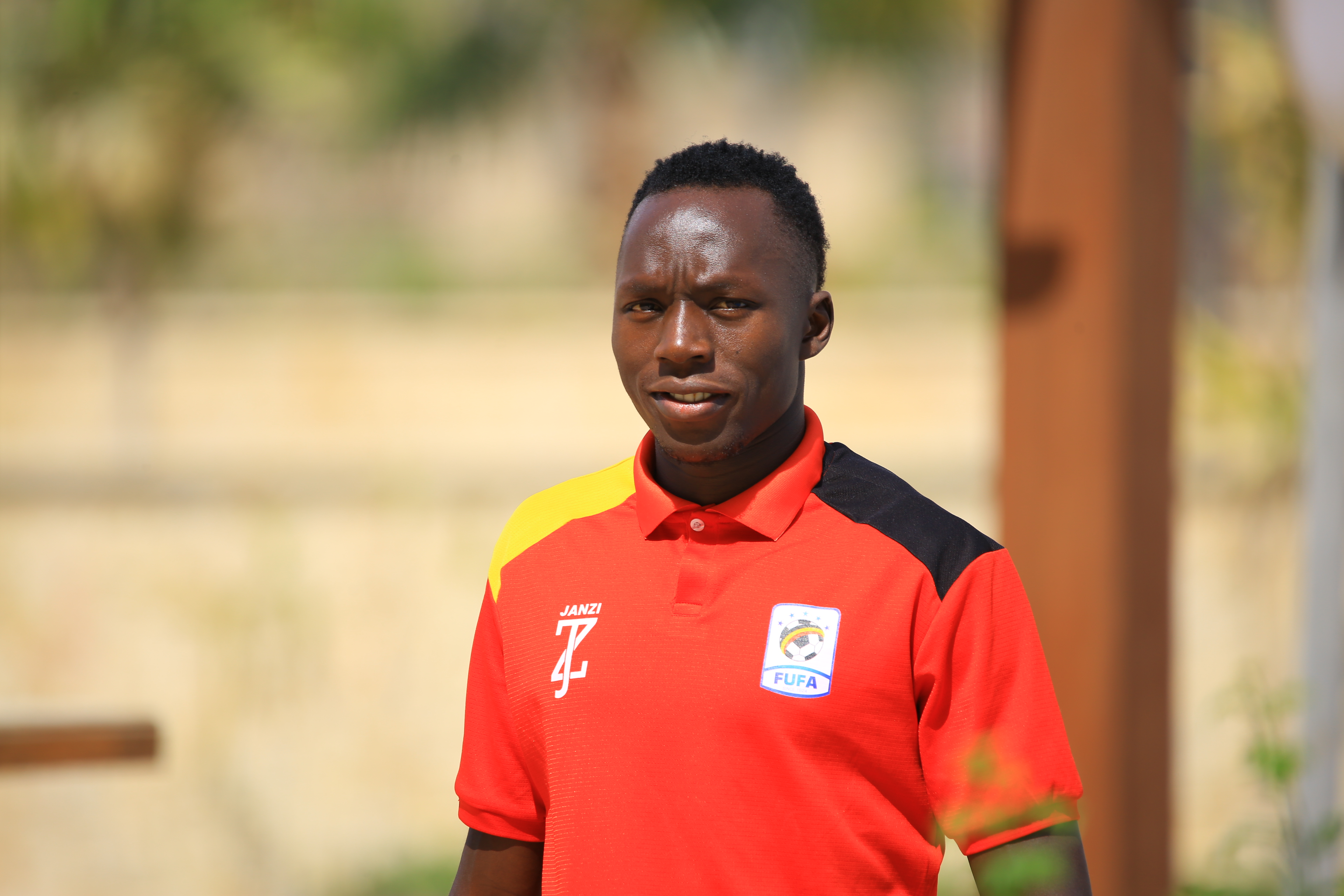
- Denis with Uganda Cranes

Personal information
- Full name: Denis Lukambi Omedi
- Date of birth: 13 June 1994 (age 32)
- Place of birth: Uganda
- Position: Forward

Team information
- Current team: Gor Mahia
- Number: 24

Youth career
- –2023: Booma FC

Senior career*
| Years | Team | Apps | (Gls) |
| 2023–2024 | Kitara | 28 | (15) |
| 2025– 2026 | APR | 10 | (3) |
| 2026- | Gor Mahia | | |

International career^{‡}
| 2023– | Uganda | 19 | (3) |
- * Club domestic league appearances and goals as of September 2024 ‡ National team caps and goals as of 27 December 2025

Denis Omedi (born 13 June 1994) is a Ugandan professional footballer who plays as a forward for Kenya Premier League club Gor Mahia the Uganda national team.

== Club career ==
Omedi began his football career at Booma FC, which is based in Masindi district. He later joined Kitara FC in the 2023 to 2024 season. He joined Rwandan Premier League club APR FC in 2025 where he scored 3 goals in 10 matches. He scored 15 goals in Uganda Premier League. Omedi was awarded the Player of the Month award for February 2024, at the Real Stars Awards held in Lugogo.

In July 2026, Omedi joined Kenya Premier League club Gor Mahia.

== International career ==
Omedi has made ten appearances for Uganda Cranes; he has scored three goals and provided four assists. He helped Uganda earn a spot in the African Cup of Nations 2025 tournament that was played in Morocco. He scored a goal against Bafana Bafana during the 2025 AFCON qualifiers match, which ended in a 2–2 draw.

== Awards and nominations ==
Omedi was nominated in the FIFA Puskas Award 2024 for his rabona strike against KCCA in the FUFA Super 8 tournament. The goal was contested for amongst other 10 contenders including Hassan Al Haydos, Terry Antonis, Yassine Benzia, Walter Bou, Michaell Chirinos, Federico Dimarco, Alejandro Garnacho, Mohammed Kudus, Jaden Philogene and Paul Onuachu. The rabona goal was also nominated for the prestigious Goal of the Year category at the CAF Awards 2024, making it the only goal alongside Benzia's volley for Algeria against South Africa to receive both nominations for CAF and Puskas.

At the 2024 FIFA Puskás Awards, the Kitara FC and Uganda Cranes forward achieved a third-place finish with a total of 16 points. His nomination celebrated his rabona goal which he scored against KCCA FC. The accolade was awarded to Manchester United and Argentina's Alejandro Garnacho, whose goal secured first place with 26 points, followed by Yassine Benzia's strike against South Africa, which earned 22 points.

In addition, Omedi was a contender in the 2024 CAF Awards, where he was nominated for the Goal of the Year category. Despite his remarkable performance, he finished sixth in the voting with 13,766 votes. The award was won by Angola's Mabululu.

Omedi's inclusion in these awards has him in the spotlight and increased his transfer prospects. His current employment contract at Kitara FC was due to expire at the end of the 2024 season, and he had offers from Spain, Egypt's Pyramids FC and Kenya's Gor Mahia. He also got offers from South Africa and Libya since the previous transfer window.

== Career statistics ==
| No. | Date | Venue | Opponent | Score | Result | Competition |
|---|---|---|---|---|---|---|
| 1. | 6 September 2024 | Orlando Stadium, Johannesburg, South Africa | South Africa | 1–1 | 2–2 | 2025 Africa Cup of Nations qualification |
| 2. | 15 October 2024 | Juba Stadium, Juba, South Sudan | South Sudan | 1–0 | 2–1 | 2025 Africa Cup of Nations qualification |
| 3. | 23 December 2025 | Rabat Olympic Stadium, Rabat, Morocco | Tunisia | 1–3 | 1–3 | 2025 Africa Cup of Nations |
