= Benin national football team results (2020–present) =

This page details the match results and statistics of the Benin national football team from 2020 to present.

== Results ==
Benin's score is shown first in each case.

Date	Venue	Opponents	Score	Competition	Benin scorers	Att.	Ref.
11 October 2020	Estádio Pina Manique, Lisbon (N)	Gabon	2–0	Friendly	Soukou 30', Mounié 75'	0 (Note: Match held behind closed doors due to the COVID-19 pandemic.)	
14 November 2020	Stade Charles de Gaulle, Porto-Novo (H)	Lesotho	1–0	2021 Africa Cup of Nations qualification	Dossou 23'		
17 November 2020	Setsoto Stadium, Maseru (A)	Lesotho	0–0	2021 Africa Cup of Nations qualification	—		
27 March 2021	Stade Charles de Gaulle, Porto-Novo (H)	Nigeria	0–1	2021 Africa Cup of Nations qualification	—		
8 June 2021	Stade de l'Amitié, Cotonou (H)	Zambia	2–2	Friendly	Soukou 12', Roche 80'		
15 June 2021 (Note: The match was originally due to be played on 30 March 2021 in Freetown, but was postponed after five Benin players tested positive for COVID-19 and Benin refused to play, questioning the validity of the tests. It was rearranged for 14 June 2021 at the General Lansana Conté Stadium in Conakry, Guinea, but Sierra Leone refused to play following positive COVID-19 tests for six of their players, with the match rearranged again for the following day at the same venue.)	General Lansana Conté Stadium, Conakry (A)	Sierra Leone	0–1	2021 Africa Cup of Nations qualification	—		
2 September 2021	Mahamasina Municipal Stadium, Antananarivo (A)	Madagascar	1–0	2022 FIFA World Cup qualification	Mounié 22'	10,000	
6 September 2021	Stade de l'Amitié, Cotonou (H)	DR Congo	1–1	2022 FIFA World Cup qualification	Adéoti 33'	5,000	
7 October 2021	Benjamin Mkapa Stadium, Dar es Salaam (A)	Tanzania	1–0	2022 FIFA World Cup qualification	Mounié 71'	500	
10 October 2021	Stade de l'Amitié, Cotonou (H)	Tanzania	0–1	2022 FIFA World Cup qualification		15,000	
11 November 2021	Stade de l'Amitié, Cotonou (H)	Madagascar	2–0	2022 FIFA World Cup qualification	Dossou 44', Mounié 79'	15,000	
14 November 2021	Stade des Martyrs, Kinshasa (A)	DR Congo	0–2	2022 FIFA World Cup qualification		500	
24 March 2022	Mardan Sports Complex, Antalya (N)	Liberia	4–0	Friendly	Soukou 11', Tosin 20', Dossou 45', Mounié 70'		
27 March 2022	Mardan Sports Complex, Antalya (N)	Zambia	2–1	Friendly	Soukou 35', Tosin 83'		
29 March 2022	Mardan Sports Complex, Antalya (N)	Togo	1–1	Friendly	Mounié 26'		
4 June 2022	Diamniadio Olympic Stadium, Diamniadio (A)	Senegal	1–3	2023 Africa Cup of Nations qualification	Olaitan 88'		
8 June 2022	Stade de l'Amitié, Cotonou (H)	Mozambique	0–1	2023 Africa Cup of Nations qualification			
24 July 2022	Cape Coast Sports Stadium, Cape Coast (A)	Ghana	0–3	2022 African Nations Championship qualification			
30 July 2022	Stade de l'Amitié, Cotonou (H)	Ghana	0–1	2022 African Nations Championship qualification			
24 September 2022	El Bachir Stadium, Mohammedia (N)	Mauritania	0–1	Friendly			
27 September 2022	El Bachir Stadium, Mohammedia (N)	Madagascar	1–3	Friendly	Aiyegun 15'		
22 March 2023	Stade de l'Amitié, Cotonou (H)	Rwanda	1–1	2023 Africa Cup of Nations qualification	Mounié 82'		
29 March 2023	Kigali Pelé Stadium, Kigali (A)	Rwanda	1–1 (Note: CAF awarded Benin a 3–0 win as a result of Rwanda fielding an ineligible player, Kevin Muhire, after the match had ended in a 1–1 draw. Muhire failed to serve a one-game ban after receiving two yellow cards in the qualifying competition.)	2023 Africa Cup of Nations qualification	Dossou 57'		
17 June 2023	Stade de l'Amitié, Cotonou (H)	Senegal	1–1	2023 Africa Cup of Nations qualification	Moumini 78'		
9 September 2023	Estádio do Zimpeto, Maputo (A)	Mozambique	2–3	2023 Africa Cup of Nations qualification	Mounié 20' pen., Dossou 50'		
14 October 2023	Phosphate Stadium, Khouribga (N)	Sierra Leone	1–1	Friendly	C. Hountondji 90+8'		
17 October 2023	Larbi Zaouli Stadium, Casablanca (N)	Madagascar	1–2	Friendly	C. Hountondji 3'		
18 November 2023	Moses Mabhida Stadium, Durban (A)	South Africa	1–2	2026 FIFA World Cup qualification	Mounié 70'		
21 November 2023	Moses Mabhida Stadium, Durban (N)	Lesotho	0–0	2026 FIFA World Cup qualification		1,000	
23 March 2024	Stade de la Licorne, Amiens (N)	Ivory Coast	2–2	Friendly	Olaitan 8', 51'	4,100	
26 March 2024	Stade de la Licorne, Amiens (N)	Senegal	0–1	Friendly		1,000	
6 June 2024	Felix Houphouet Boigny Stadium, Abidjan (H) (Note: Home matches played at Felix Houphouet Boigny Stadium in Abidjan, Ivory Coast due to lack of a suitable stadium in Benin.)	Rwanda	1–0	2026 FIFA World Cup qualification	Dokou 37'	3,600	
10 June 2024	Felix Houphouet Boigny Stadium, Abidjan (H)	Nigeria	2–1	2026 FIFA World Cup qualification	Dossou 37', Mounié 45+3'	9,000	
7 September 2024	Godswill Akpabio Stadium, Uyo (A)	Nigeria	0–3	2025 Africa Cup of Nations qualification			
10 September 2024	Felix Houphouet Boigny Stadium, Abidjan (H)	Libya	2–1	2025 Africa Cup of Nations qualification	Mounié 50', Olaitan 62' pen.		
11 October 2024	Felix Houphouet Boigny Stadium, Abidjan (H)	Rwanda	3–0	2025 Africa Cup of Nations qualification	Mounié 7', A. Hountondji 67', Hassane 70'		
15 October 2024	Amahoro Stadium, Kigali (A)	Rwanda	1–2	2025 Africa Cup of Nations qualification	A. Hountondji 42'		
14 November 2024	Felix Houphouet Boigny Stadium, Abidjan (H)	Nigeria	1–1	2025 Africa Cup of Nations qualification	Tijani 16'		
18 November 2024	Tripoli Stadium, Tripoli (A)	Libya	0–0	2025 Africa Cup of Nations qualification			
20 March 2025	Moses Mabhida Stadium, Durban (N)	Zimbabwe	2–2	2026 FIFA World Cup qualification	Mounié 12', Dokou 35'	5,000	
25 March 2025	Felix Houphouet Boigny Stadium, Abidjan (H)	South Africa	0–2	2026 FIFA World Cup qualification		786	
9 June 2025	Fez Stadium, Fez (A)	Morocco	0–1	Friendly		34,000	
5 September 2025	Alassane Ouattara Stadium, Anyama (N)	Zimbabwe	1–0	2026 FIFA World Cup qualification	Mounié 77'	457	
9 September 2025	Felix Houphouet Boigny Stadium, Abidjan (N)	Lesotho	4–0	2026 FIFA World Cup qualification	Mounié 6', A. Hountondji 23', Hassane 33', Olaitan 67'	3,417	

== Record by opponent ==
Team	Pld	W	D	L	GF	GA	GD	WPCT
Algeria	11	1	2	8	8	25	−17	9.09
Argentina	1	0	0	1	0	3	−3	0.00
Botswana	1	1	0	0	1	0	+1	100.00
Burkina Faso	20	4	6	10	24	33	−9	20.00
DR Congo	3	0	1	2	1	4	−3	0.00
Egypt	1	0	0	1	1	3	−2	0.00
Gabon	1	1	0	0	2	0	+2	100.00
Ghana	2	0	0	2	0	4	−4	0.00
Guinea	1	1	0	0	1	0	+1	100.00
Ivory Coast	18	2	4	12	16	38	−22	11.11
Lesotho	4	2	2	0	5	0	+5	50.00
Liberia	2	2	0	0	5	0	+5	100.00
Libya	6	3	0	3	7	9	−2	50.00
Madagascar	4	2	0	2	5	5	0	50.00
Mauritania	2	1	0	1	2	2	0	50.00
Mozambique	2	0	0	2	2	4	−2	0.00
Niger	1	0	1	0	1	1	0	0.00
Nigeria	26	2	3	21	13	68	−55	7.69
Rwanda	6	4	1	1	10	3	+7	66.67
Senegal	4	0	1	3	2	8	−6	0.00
Sierra Leone	2	0	1	1	1	2	−1	0.00
South Africa	2	0	0	2	1	4	−3	0.00
Tanzania	2	1	0	1	1	1	0	50.00
Togo	24	2	12	10	17	28	−11	8.33
Zambia	2	1	1	0	4	3	+1	50.00
Zimbabwe	2	1	1	0	3	2	+1	50.00
Total	150	31	36	83	133	250	−117	20.67

Updated to match(es) played on match played 5 June 2026. Source: Results
