= 2026 FIFA World Cup qualification – CAF Group D =

Association football competition in Africa

The 2026 FIFA World Cup qualification – CAF Group D was a CAF qualifying group for the 2026 FIFA World Cup. The group contained Cameroon, Cape Verde, Angola, Libya, Eswatini and Mauritius.

The group winners, Cape Verde, directly qualified for the World Cup, and the runners-up, Cameroon, qualified for the second round to compete for a place in the inter-confederation play-offs.

== Standings ==
Pos	Team	Pld	W	D	L	GF	GA	GD	Pts	Qualification	(Cape Verde)	(Cameroon)	(Libya)	(Angola)	(Mauritius)	(Eswatini)
1	Cape Verde	10	7	2	1	16	8	+8	23	2026 FIFA World Cup	—	1–0	1–0	0–0	1–0	3–0
2	Cameroon	10	5	4	1	17	5	+12	19	Second round	4–1	—	3–1	0–0	3–0	3–0
3	Libya	10	4	4	2	12	10	+2	16		3–3	1–1	—	1–1	2–1	2–0
4	Angola	10	2	6	2	9	8	+1	12		1–2	1–1	0–1	—	3–1	1–0
5	Mauritius	10	1	3	6	7	17	−10	6		0–2	0–2	0–0	0–0	—	2–1
6	Eswatini	10	0	3	7	6	19	−13	3		0–2	0–0	0–1	2–2	3–3	—

Source: FIFA
Rules for classification: Tiebreakers

== Matches ==
16 November 2023
18:00 UTC−1

Cape Verde	0–0	Angola
	Report

Estádio Nacional de Cabo Verde, Praia
Referee: Youcef Gamouh (Algeria)
17 November 2023
15:00 UTC+2

Eswatini	0–1	Libya
	Report	Krawa'a 53'

Mbombela Stadium, Mbombela (South Africa)
Attendance: 200
Referee: Omar Abdulkadir Artan (Somalia)
17 November 2023
20:00 UTC+1

Cameroon	3–0	Mauritius
Mbeumo 45+2'; Nkoudou 87'; Magri 90+2'	Report

Japoma Stadium, Douala
Attendance: 25,000
Referee: Ahmed Arajiga (Tanzania)

21 November 2023
15:00 UTC+2

Eswatini	0–2	Cape Verde
	Report	Mendes 17'; Monteiro 38'

Mbombela Stadium, Mbombela (South Africa)
Attendance: 250
Referee: Sabri Mohamed Fadul (Sudan)
21 November 2023
18:00 UTC+2

Libya	1–1	Cameroon
Aleiyan 43'	Report	Ntcham 34' (pen.)

Benina Martyrs Stadium, Benghazi
Attendance: 13,450
Referee: Adissa Abdul Raphiou Ligali (Benin)
21 November 2023
20:00 UTC+4

Mauritius	0–0	Angola
	Report

Côte d'Or National Sports Complex, Saint Pierre
Attendance: 3,700
Referee: Godfrey Nkhakananga (Malawi)

6 June 2024
18:00 UTC+2

Libya	2–1	Mauritius
Al Badri 20' (pen.); Krawa'a 40'	Report	Bru 34'

Benina Martyrs Stadium, Benghazi
Referee: Brighton Chimene (Zimbabwe)
7 June 2024
20:00 UTC+1

Angola	1–0	Eswatini
Mabululu 2'	Report

Estádio 11 de Novembro, Luanda
Attendance: 30,000
Referee: Hillary Hambaba (Zambia)
8 June 2024
17:00 UTC+1

Cameroon	4–1	Cape Verde
Ngadeu-Ngadjui 13'; Aboubakar 25', 44' (pen.); Nouhou 54'	Report	Monteiro 37'

Ahmadou Ahidjo Stadium, Yaoundé
Referee: Mustapha Ghorbal (Algeria)

11 June 2024
17:00 UTC+4

Mauritius	2–1	Eswatini
Gaspard 19'; Rose 45'	Report	Magagula 66'

Côte d'Or National Sports Complex, Saint Pierre
Attendance: 4,000
Referee: Mohamed Athoumani (Comoros)
11 June 2024
15:00 UTC−1

Cape Verde	1–0	Libya
Diney 10'	Report

Estádio Nacional de Cabo Verde, Praia
Referee: Ibrahim Kalilou Traore (Ivory Coast)
11 June 2024
20:00 UTC+1

Angola	1–1	Cameroon
Ngadeu-Ngadjui 54' (o.g.)	Report	Mbeumo 11'

Estádio 11 de Novembro, Luanda
Attendance: 40,000
Referee: Mohamed Adel Elsaid (Egypt)

19 March 2025
18:00 UTC+2

Eswatini	0–0	Cameroon
	Report

Mbombela Stadium, Mbombela (South Africa)
Attendance: 708
Referee: Lucky Kasalirwe (Uganda)
20 March 2025
15:00 UTC−1

Cape Verde	1–0	Mauritius
Y. Semedo 84'	Report

Estádio Nacional de Cabo Verde, Praia
Referee: Yannick Malala Kabanga (DR Congo)
20 March 2025
21:00 UTC+2

Libya	1–1	Angola
Ellafi 74'	Report	Fredy 90+3'

Benina Martyrs Stadium, Benghazi
Referee: Lamin Jammeh (Gambia)

23 March 2025
15:00 UTC+2

Eswatini	3–3	Mauritius
P. Mkhontfo 13', 18'; Mabuza 75'	Report	Rose 47'; Aristide 50'; Vincent 90+1'

Mbombela Stadium, Mbombela (South Africa)
Referee: Younoussa Tawel Camara (Guinea)
25 March 2025
17:00 UTC+1

Angola	1–2	Cape Verde
Dala 50'	Report	Livramento 45+2', 63'

Estádio 11 de Novembro, Luanda
Referee: Mustapha Ghorbal (Algeria)
25 March 2025
20:00 UTC+1

Cameroon	3–1	Libya
Aboubakar 27' (pen.), 61'; Mbeumo 53'	Report	El Maremi 90+1'

Ahmadou Ahidjo Stadium, Yaoundé
Attendance: 28,000
Referee: Abongile Tom (South Africa)

4 September 2025
17:00 UTC+1

Angola	0–1	Libya
	Report	El Maremi 48'

Estádio 11 de Novembro, Luanda
Referee: Pierre Jean Nguiene (Congo)
4 September 2025
20:00 UTC+4

Mauritius	0–2	Cape Verde
	Report	Cabral 22'; Diney 70'

Côte d'Or National Sports Complex, Saint Pierre
Referee: Mohamed Diraneh Guedi (Djibouti)
4 September 2025
20:00 UTC+1

Cameroon	3–0	Eswatini
Gamedze 6' (o.g.); Nkoudou 25'; Avom 28'	Report

Ahmadou Ahidjo Stadium, Yaoundé
Attendance: 25,000
Referee: Dahane Beida (Mauritania)

8 September 2025
21:00 UTC+2

Libya	2–0	Eswatini
Eisay 8'; El Maremi 19'	Report

Benghazi International Stadium, Benghazi
Referee: Adalbert Diouf (Senegal)
9 September 2025
15:00 UTC−1

Cape Verde	1–0	Cameroon
Livramento 54'	Report

Estádio Nacional de Cabo Verde, Praia
Referee: Daniel Nii Laryea (Ghana)
9 September 2025
20:00 UTC+1

Angola	3–1	Mauritius
Nzola 17'; Fredy 57'; Zini 63'	Report	W. François 21'

Estádio 11 de Novembro, Luanda
Referee: Boubou Traoré (Mali)

8 October 2025
17:00 UTC+4

Mauritius	0–2	Cameroon
	Report	Ngamaleu 57'; Mbeumo 90+2'

Côte d'Or National Sports Complex, Saint Pierre
Referee: Tewodros Mitiku (Ethiopia)
8 October 2025
15:00 UTC+2

Libya	3–3	Cape Verde
Pico 1' (o.g.); El Maremi 42'; Al-Shalui 58'	Report	Arcanjo 29'; Lopes Cabral 76'; W. Semedo 82'

Tripoli Stadium, Tripoli
Referee: Mahmood Ali Mahmood Ismail (Sudan)
8 October 2025
15:00 UTC+2

Eswatini	2–2	Angola
Figuareido 48', 54'	Report	Buatu 69'; Papel 80'

Somhlolo National Stadium, Lobamba
Referee: Dickens Nyagrowa (Kenya)

13 October 2025
15:00 UTC−1

Cape Verde	3–0	Eswatini
Livramento 48'; W. Semedo 54'; Stopira 90+1'	Report

Estádio Nacional de Cabo Verde, Praia
Referee: Ahmed Arajiga (Tanzania)
13 October 2025
20:00 UTC+4

Mauritius	0–0	Libya
	Report

Côte d'Or National Sports Complex, Saint Pierre
Attendance: 4,000
Referee: Yannick Malala Kabanga (DR Congo)
13 October 2025
17:00 UTC+1

Cameroon	0–0	Angola
	Report

Ahmadou Ahidjo Stadium, Yaoundé
Attendance: 20,000
Referee: Djindo Louis Houngnandande (Benin)

== Goalscorers ==
There were 67 goals scored in 30 matches, for an average of 2.23 goals per match.

4 goals

- (Cameroon national football team) Vincent Aboubakar
- (Cameroon national football team) Bryan Mbeumo
- (Cape Verde national football team) Dailon Livramento
- (Libya national football team) Ezoo El Maremi

2 goals

- (Angola national football team) Fredy
- (Cameroon national football team) Georges-Kévin Nkoudou
- (Cape Verde national football team) Diney
- (Cape Verde national football team) Jamiro Monteiro
- (Cape Verde national football team) Willy Semedo
- (Eswatini national football team) Justice Figuareido
- (Eswatini national football team) Philani Mkhontfo
- (Libya national football team) Ahmed Krawa'a
- (Mauritius national football team) Lindsay Rose

1 goal

- (Angola national football team) Jonathan Buatu
- (Angola national football team) Gelson Dala
- (Angola national football team) Mabululu
- (Angola national football team) M'Bala Nzola
- (Angola national football team) Ary Papel
- (Angola national football team) Zini
- (Cameroon national football team) Arthur Avom
- (Cameroon national football team) Frank Magri
- (Cameroon national football team) Michael Ngadeu-Ngadjui
- (Cameroon national football team) Moumi Ngamaleu
- (Cameroon national football team) Olivier Ntcham
- (Cameroon national football team) Nouhou Tolo
- (Cape Verde national football team) Telmo Arcanjo
- (Cape Verde national football team) Jovane Cabral
- (Cape Verde national football team) Sidny Lopes Cabral
- (Cape Verde national football team) Ryan Mendes
- (Cape Verde national football team) Yannick Semedo
- (Cape Verde national football team) Stopira
- (Eswatini national football team) Mayibongwe Mabuza
- (Eswatini national football team) Junior Magagula
- (Libya national football team) Faisal Al Badri
- (Libya national football team) Abdulmunem Aleiyan
- (Libya national football team) Mahmoud Al Shalwi
- (Libya national football team) Muad Eisay
- (Libya national football team) Muaid Ellafi
- (Mauritius national football team) Yannick Aristide
- (Mauritius national football team) Kévin Bru
- (Mauritius national football team) William François
- (Mauritius national football team) Mike Gaspard
- (Mauritius national football team) Emmanuel Vincent

1 own goal

- (Cameroon national football team) Michael Ngadeu-Ngadjui (against Angola)
- (Cape Verde national football team) Pico (against Libya)
- (Eswatini national football team) Gift Gamedze (against Cameroon)

== Discipline ==
A player was automatically suspended for the next match for the following infractions:

- Receiving a red card (red card suspensions could be extended for serious infractions)
- Receiving two yellow cards in two different matches (yellow card suspensions were carried forward to further qualification rounds, but not the finals or any other future international matches)

The following suspensions were served during the group stage:

Team	Player	Infraction(s)	Suspended for match(es)
Angola	Mabululu	(yellow card) vs Eswatini (7 June 2024); (yellow card) vs Cameroon (11 June 2024)	vs Libya (20 March 2025)
Cameroon	Carlos Baleba	(yellow card) vs Cape Verde (8 June 2024); (yellow card) vs Libya (25 March 2025)	vs Eswatini (4 September 2025)
Eswatini	Neliswa Dlamini	(yellow card) vs Cape Verde (21 November 2023); (yellow card) vs Mauritius (11 June 2024)	vs Cameroon (19 March 2025)
Libya	Faisal Al Badri	(yellow card) vs Cape Verde (11 June 2024); (yellow card) vs Angola (20 March 2025)	vs Cameroon (25 March 2025)
Libya	Omar Al Khouja	(yellow card) vs Eswatini (17 November 2023); (yellow card) vs Angola (20 March 2025)	vs Cameroon (25 March 2025)
Libya	Al-Musrati	(red card) vs Mauritius (6 June 2024)	vs Cape Verde (11 June 2024)
Libya	Osama Al Shuraimi	(yellow card) vs Mauritius (6 June 2024); (yellow card) vs Cape Verde (11 June 2024)	vs Angola (20 March 2025)
Libya	Muaid Ellafi	(yellow card) vs Angola (20 March 2025); (yellow card) vs Cameroon (25 March 2025)	vs Angola (4 September 2025)
Libya	Fadel Mansour	(yellow card) vs Cameroon (21 November 2023); (yellow card) vs Angola (20 March 2025)	vs Cameroon (25 March 2025)
