= 2026 FIFA World Cup qualification – CAF Group C =

Association football competition in Africa

The 2026 FIFA World Cup qualification – CAF Group C was a CAF qualifying group for the 2026 FIFA World Cup. The group contained Nigeria, South Africa, Benin, Zimbabwe, Rwanda and Lesotho.

The group winners, South Africa, directly qualified for the World Cup, and the runners-up, Nigeria, qualified for the second round to compete for a place in the inter-confederation play-offs.

== Standings ==
Pos	Team	Pld	W	D	L	GF	GA	GD	Pts	Qualification	(South Africa)	(Nigeria)	(Benin)	(Lesotho)	(Rwanda)	(Zimbabwe)
1	South Africa	10	5	3	2	15	9	+6	18	2026 FIFA World Cup	—	1–1	2–1	0–3 (Note: The South Africa v Lesotho match, which originally finished as a 2–0 win for South Africa, was later awarded as a 3–0 win to Lesotho as South Africa fielded an ineligible player, Teboho Mokoena.)	3–0	3–1
2	Nigeria	10	4	5	1	15	8	+7	17	Second round	1–1	—	4–0	1–1	1–0	1–1
3	Benin	10	5	2	3	12	11	+1	17		0–2	2–1	—	4–0	1–0	1–0
4	Lesotho	10	3	3	4	9	12	−3	12		0–3	1–2	0–0	—	0–1	1–0
5	Rwanda	10	3	2	5	5	9	−4	11		2–0	0–2	0–1	1–1	—	0–0
6	Zimbabwe	10	0	5	5	5	12	−7	5		0–0	1–1	2–2	0–2	0–1	—

Source: FIFA
Rules for classification: Tiebreakers

== Matches ==
15 November 2023
15:00 UTC+2

Rwanda	0–0	Zimbabwe
	Report

Huye Stadium, Butare
Attendance: 7,500
Referee: Mohamed Ali Moussa (Niger)
16 November 2023
17:00 UTC+1

Nigeria	1–1	Lesotho
Ajayi 67'	Report	Mkwanazi 56'

Godswill Akpabio International Stadium, Uyo
Referee: Mehrez Malki (Tunisia)
18 November 2023
15:00 UTC+2

South Africa	2–1	Benin
Tau 2'; Mudau 45+2'	Report	Mounié 70'

Moses Mabhida Stadium, Durban
Referee: Mahmood Ismail (Sudan)

19 November 2023
15:00 UTC+2

Zimbabwe	1–1	Nigeria
W. Musona 26'	Report	Iheanacho 67'

Huye Stadium, Butare (Rwanda)
Attendance: 2,876
Referee: Souleiman Ahmed Djama (Djibouti)
21 November 2023
15:00 UTC+2

Lesotho	0–0	Benin
	Report

Moses Mabhida Stadium, Durban (South Africa)
Attendance: 1,000
Referee: Tsegay Mogos Teklu (Eritrea)
21 November 2023
15:00 UTC+2

Rwanda	2–0	South Africa
Nshuti 12'; Mugisha 28'	Report

Huye Stadium, Butare
Referee: Amin Omar (Egypt)

6 June 2024
19:00 UTC+0

Benin	1–0	Rwanda
Dokou 37'	Report

Felix Houphouet Boigny Stadium, Abidjan (Ivory Coast)
Attendance: 3,600
Referee: Dahane Beida (Mauritania)
7 June 2024
15:00 UTC+2

Zimbabwe	0–2	Lesotho
	Report	Rasethuntša 21'; Thabantso 31'

Orlando Stadium, Johannesburg (South Africa)
Referee: Thulani Sibandze (Eswatini)
7 June 2024
20:00 UTC+1

Nigeria	1–1	South Africa
Dele-Bashiru 46'	Report	Zwane 29'

Godswill Akpabio International Stadium, Uyo
Referee: Alhadi Allaou Mahamat (Chad)

10 June 2024
16:00 UTC+0

Benin	2–1	Nigeria
J. Dossou 37'; Mounié 45+3'	Report	Onyedika 27'

Felix Houphouet Boigny Stadium, Abidjan (Ivory Coast)
Attendance: 9,000
Referee: Pierre Atcho (Gabon)
11 June 2024
18:00 UTC+2

South Africa	3–1	Zimbabwe
Rayners 1'; Morena 55', 76'	Report	Chirewa 2'

Free State Stadium, Bloemfontein
Referee: Mohamed Maarouf Eid Mansour (Egypt)
11 June 2024
18:00 UTC+2

Lesotho	0–1	Rwanda
	Report	Kwizera 67'

Moses Mabhida Stadium, Durban (South Africa)
Attendance: 2,000
Referee: Aklesso Gnama (Togo)

20 March 2025
18:00 UTC+2

Zimbabwe	2–2	Benin
Munetsi 44'; K. Musona 59'	Report	Mounié 12'; Dokou 35'

Moses Mabhida Stadium, Durban (South Africa)
Attendance: 5,000
Referee: Bamlak Tessema Weyesa (Ethiopia)
21 March 2025
18:00 UTC+2

South Africa	0–3 Awarded (Note: The South Africa v Lesotho match originally finished as a 2–0 win for South Africa. However, on 29 September 2025, the FIFA Disciplinary Committee awarded the match as a 3–0 win to Lesotho as South Africa fielded the ineligible player Teboho Mokoena. The South African Football Association were also fined CHF 10,000.)	Lesotho
Mofokeng 60'; Adams 64'	Report

Peter Mokaba Stadium, Polokwane
Attendance: 25,000
Referee: Mohamed Diraneh Guedi (Djibouti)
21 March 2025
18:00 UTC+2

Rwanda	0–2	Nigeria
	Report	Osimhen 11', 45+3'

Amahoro Stadium, Kigali
Referee: Jalal Jayed (Morocco)

25 March 2025
16:00 UTC+0

Benin	0–2	South Africa
	Report	Foster 53'; Adams 84'

Felix Houphouet Boigny Stadium, Abidjan (Ivory Coast)
Attendance: 786
Referee: Dahane Beida (Mauritania)
25 March 2025
17:00 UTC+1

Nigeria	1–1	Zimbabwe
Osimhen 74'	Report	Chirewa 90'

Godswill Akpabio International Stadium, Uyo
Referee: Tsegay Mogos Teklu (Eritrea)
25 March 2025
18:00 UTC+2

Rwanda	1–1	Lesotho
Kwizera 58'	Report	Fothoane 82'

Amahoro Stadium, Kigali
Attendance: 43,000
Referee: Antoine Effa (Cameroon)

5 September 2025
16:00 UTC+0

Benin	1–0	Zimbabwe
Mounié 77'	Report

Alassane Ouattara Stadium, Abidjan (Ivory Coast)
Attendance: 457
Referee: Lamin Jammeh (Gambia)
5 September 2025
18:00 UTC+2

Lesotho	0–3	South Africa
	Report	Nkota 15'; Foster 63'; Appollis 67'

Free State Stadium, Bloemfontein (South Africa)
Attendance: 10,000
Referee: Dickens Mimisa (Kenya)
6 September 2025
17:00 UTC+1

Nigeria	1–0	Rwanda
Arokodare 51'	Report

Godswill Akpabio International Stadium, Uyo
Referee: Alhadi Allaou Mahamat (Chad)

9 September 2025
15:00 UTC+2

Zimbabwe	0–1	Rwanda
	Report	Mugisha 40'

Orlando Stadium, Johannesburg (South Africa)
Referee: Abdou Abdel Mefire (Cameroon)
9 September 2025
18:00 UTC+2

South Africa	1–1	Nigeria
Troost-Ekong 25' (o.g.)	Report	Bassey 44'

Free State Stadium, Bloemfontein
Referee: Pierre Atcho (Gabon)
9 September 2025
20:45 UTC+0

Benin	4–0	Lesotho
Mounié 6'; Hountondji 23'; Imourane 33'; Olaitan 67'	Report

Felix Houphouet Boigny Stadium, Abidjan (Ivory Coast)
Attendance: 3,417
Referee: Mahmood Ali Mahmood Ismail (Sudan)

10 October 2025
18:00 UTC+2

Rwanda	0–1	Benin
	Report	Aiyegun 80'

Amahoro Stadium, Kigali
Referee: Mohamed Maarouf Eid Mansour (Egypt)
10 October 2025
18:00 UTC+2

Lesotho	1–2	Nigeria
Kalake 83'	Report	Troost-Ekong 55' (pen.); Adams 80'

Peter Mokaba Stadium, Polokwane (South Africa)
Referee: Alhadi Allaou Mahamat (Chad)
10 October 2025
18:00 UTC+2

Zimbabwe	0–0	South Africa
	Report

Moses Mabhida Stadium, Durban (South Africa)
Referee: Mustapha Ghorbal (Algeria)

13 October 2025
18:00 UTC+2

Lesotho	1–0	Zimbabwe
Kalake 90+3'	Report

Peter Mokaba Stadium, Polokwane (South Africa)
Attendance: 3,500
Referee: Tsegay Mogos Teklu (Eritrea)
14 October 2025
18:00 UTC+2

South Africa	3–0	Rwanda
Mbatha 5'; Appollis 26'; Makgopa 72'	Report

Mbombela Stadium, Mbombela
Attendance: 13,000
Referee: Mehrez Malki (Tunisia)
14 October 2025
17:00 UTC+1

Nigeria	4–0	Benin
Osimhen 3', 37', 51'; Onyeka 90+1'	Report

Godswill Akpabio International Stadium, Uyo
Referee: Amin Omar (Egypt)

== Goalscorers ==
There were 60 goals scored in 30 matches, for an average of 2 goals per match.

6 goals

- (Nigeria national football team) Victor Osimhen

5 goals

- (Benin national football team) Steve Mounié

2 goals

- (Benin national football team) Dodo Dokou
- (Lesotho national football team) Hlompho Kalake
- (Rwanda national football team) Jojea Kwizera
- (Rwanda national football team) Gilbert Mugisha
- (South Africa national soccer team) Jayden Adams
- (South Africa national soccer team) Oswin Appollis
- (South Africa national soccer team) Lyle Foster
- (South Africa national soccer team) Thapelo Morena
- (Zimbabwe national football team) Tawanda Chirewa

1 goal

- (Benin national football team) Jodel Dossou
- (Benin national football team) Andréas Hountondji
- (Benin national football team) Hassane Imourane
- (Benin national football team) Junior Olaitan
- (Benin national football team) Aiyegun Tosin
- (Lesotho national football team) Lehlohonolo Fothoane
- (Lesotho national football team) Motlomelo Mkwanazi
- (Lesotho national football team) Rethabile Rasethuntsa
- (Lesotho national football team) Jane Thabantso
- (Nigeria national football team) Akor Adams
- (Nigeria national football team) Semi Ajayi
- (Nigeria national football team) Tolu Arokodare
- (Nigeria national football team) Calvin Bassey
- (Nigeria national football team) Fisayo Dele-Bashiru
- (Nigeria national football team) Kelechi Iheanacho
- (Nigeria national football team) Raphael Onyedika
- (Nigeria national football team) Frank Onyeka
- (Nigeria national football team) William Troost-Ekong
- (Rwanda national football team) Innocent Nshuti
- (South Africa national soccer team) Evidence Makgopa
- (South Africa national soccer team) Thalente Mbatha
- (South Africa national soccer team) Relebohile Mofokeng
- (South Africa national soccer team) Khuliso Mudau
- (South Africa national soccer team) Mohau Nkota
- (South Africa national soccer team) Iqraam Rayners
- (South Africa national soccer team) Percy Tau
- (South Africa national soccer team) Themba Zwane
- (Zimbabwe national football team) Marshall Munetsi
- (Zimbabwe national football team) Knowledge Musona
- (Zimbabwe national football team) Walter Musona

1 own goal

- (Nigeria national football team) William Troost-Ekong (against South Africa)

== Discipline ==
A player was automatically suspended for the next match for the following infractions:

- Receiving a red card (red card suspensions could be extended for serious infractions)
- Receiving two yellow cards in two different matches (yellow card suspensions were carried forward to further qualification rounds, but not the finals or any other future international matches)

The following suspensions were served during the group stage:

Team	Player	Infraction(s)	Suspended for match(es)
Benin	Dodo Dokou	(yellow card) vs Rwanda (6 June 2024); (yellow card) vs South Africa (25 March 2025)	vs Zimbabwe (5 September 2025)
Lesotho	Motlomelo Mkhwanazi	(yellow card) vs Nigeria (16 November 2023); (yellow card) vs Benin (21 November 2023)	vs Zimbabwe (7 June 2024)
Lesotho	Motlomelo Mkhwanazi	(yellow card) vs Rwanda (11 June 2024); (yellow card) vs Rwanda (25 March 2025)	vs South Africa (5 September 2025)
Rwanda	Djihad Bizimana	(yellow card) vs Lesotho (11 June 2024); (yellow card) vs Nigeria (21 March 2025)	vs Lesotho (25 March 2025)
South Africa	Teboho Mokoena	(yellow card) vs Benin (18 November 2023); (yellow card) vs Zimbabwe (11 June 2024)	vs Lesotho (21 March 2025)
Zimbabwe	Andrew Mbeba	(yellow card) vs Rwanda (15 November 2023); (yellow card) vs Lesotho (7 June 2024)	vs South Africa (11 June 2024)
Zimbabwe	Marshall Munetsi	(yellow card) vs Lesotho (7 June 2024); (yellow card) vs Nigeria (25 March 2025)	vs Benin (5 September 2025)
