= 2026 FIFA World Cup qualification – CAF Group B =

Association football competition in Africa

The 2026 FIFA World Cup qualification – CAF Group B was a CAF qualifying group for the 2026 FIFA World Cup. The group contained Senegal, DR Congo, Mauritania, Togo, Sudan and South Sudan.

The group winners, Senegal, directly qualified for the World Cup, and the runners-up, DR Congo, qualified for the second round to compete for a place in the inter-confederation play-offs.

== Standings ==
Pos	Team	Pld	W	D	L	GF	GA	GD	Pts	Qualification	(Senegal)	(Democratic Republic of the Congo)	(Sudan)	(Togo)	(Mauritania)	(South Sudan)
1	Senegal	10	7	3	0	22	3	+19	24	2026 FIFA World Cup	—	1–1	2–0	2–0	4–0	4–0
2	DR Congo	10	7	1	2	15	6	+9	22	Second round	2–3	—	1–0	1–0	2–0	1–0
3	Sudan	10	3	4	3	8	6	+2	13		0–0	1–0	—	1–1	0–0	1–1
4	Togo	10	1	5	4	5	10	−5	8		0–0	0–1	1–0	—	2–2	1–1
5	Mauritania	10	1	4	5	4	13	−9	7		0–1	0–2	0–2	2–0	—	0–0
6	South Sudan	10	0	5	5	3	19	−16	5		0–5	1–4	0–3	0–0	0–0	—

Source: FIFA
Rules for classification: Tiebreakers

== Matches ==
15 November 2023
17:00 UTC+1

DR Congo	2–0	Mauritania
Wissa 62'; Bongonda 81'	Report

Stade des Martyrs, Kinshasa
Referee: Elmabrouk Muhammad (Libya)
16 November 2023
18:00 UTC+2

Sudan	1–1	Togo
Eisa 17' (pen.)	Report	Denkey 43'

Benina Martyrs Stadium, Benghazi (Libya)
Referee: Andofetra Rakotojaona (Madagascar)
18 November 2023
19:00 UTC+0

Senegal	4–0	South Sudan
P. Sarr 1'; Mané 5', 56' (pen.); L. Camara 45'	Report

Diamniadio Olympic Stadium, Diamniadio
Referee: Retselisitsoe David Molise (Lesotho)

19 November 2023
18:00 UTC+2

Sudan	1–0	DR Congo
Pickel 79' (o.g.)	Report

Benina Martyrs Stadium, Benghazi (Libya)
Attendance: 3,700
Referee: Bamlak Tessema Weyesa (Ethiopia)
21 November 2023
16:00 UTC+0

South Sudan	0–0	Mauritania
	Report

Diamniadio Olympic Stadium, Diamniadio (Senegal)
Referee: Patrice Milazare (Mauritius)
21 November 2023
16:00 UTC+0

Togo	0–0	Senegal
	Report

Stade de Kégué, Lomé
Referee: Mustapha Ghorbal (Algeria)

5 June 2024
16:00 UTC+0

Togo	1–1	South Sudan
Narey 61'	Report	Aholou 68' (o.g.)

Stade de Kégué, Lomé
Referee: Celso Alvação (Mozambique)
6 June 2024
16:00 UTC+0

Mauritania	0–2	Sudan
	Report	Teiri 15'; Abeid 29' (o.g.)

Cheikha Ould Boïdiya Stadium, Nouakchott
Referee: Daniel Nii Laryea (Ghana)
6 June 2024
19:00 UTC+0

Senegal	1–1	DR Congo
I. Sarr 45+1'	Report	Mayele 85'

Diamniadio Olympic Stadium, Diamniadio
Referee: Mutaz Ibrahim (Libya)

9 June 2024
17:00 UTC+1

DR Congo	1–0	Togo
Elia 6'	Report

Stade des Martyrs, Kinshasa
Referee: Mehrez Malki (Tunisia)
9 June 2024
16:00 UTC+0

Mauritania	0–1	Senegal
	Report	H. Diallo 27'

Cheikha Ould Boïdiya Stadium, Nouakchott
Referee: Samir Guezzaz (Morocco)
11 June 2024
15:00 UTC+2

South Sudan	0–3	Sudan
	Report	Khedr 45+3'; Muzmel 51'; Al Gharbal 78'

Juba Stadium, Juba
Attendance: 10,000
Referee: Ahmad Heeralall (Mauritius)

21 March 2025
17:00 UTC+1

DR Congo	1–0	South Sudan
Bongonda 45+3'	Report

Stade des Martyrs, Kinshasa
Attendance: 70,000
Referee: Celso Alvação (Mozambique)
22 March 2025
16:00 UTC+0

Togo	2–2	Mauritania
Klidjé 4'; Denkey 69'	Report	Koïta 52'; Mahmoud 55'

Stade de Kégué, Lomé
Referee: Amin Mohamed Omar (Egypt)
22 March 2025
21:00 UTC+2

Sudan	0–0	Senegal
	Report

Benina Martyrs Stadium, Benghazi (Libya)
Referee: Patrice Tanguy Mebiame (Gabon)

25 March 2025
21:00 UTC+2

Sudan	1–1	South Sudan
M. Eisa 76'	Report	Sebit 90+8'

Benina Martyrs Stadium, Benghazi (Libya)
Referee: Jean Ouattara (Burkina Faso)
25 March 2025
21:00 UTC+0

Senegal	2–0	Togo
P. Sarr 35'; Boma 67' (o.g.)	Report

Diamniadio Olympic Stadium, Diamniadio
Referee: Peter Waweru (Kenya)
25 March 2025
21:00 UTC+0

Mauritania	0–2	DR Congo
	Report	Pickel 4'; Mayele 83'

Nouadhibou Municipal Stadium, Nouadhibou
Referee: Mohamed Athoumani (Comoros)

5 September 2025
14:00 UTC+2

South Sudan	1–4	DR Congo
Majak 68'	Report	Bakambu 13', 36'; Mbuku 45+1'; Wissa 57'

Juba Stadium, Juba
Referee: Brighton Chimene (Zimbabwe)
5 September 2025
19:00 UTC+0

Mauritania	2–0	Togo
Yade 13'; Abeid 68'	Report

Nouadhibou Municipal Stadium, Nouadhibou
Referee: Lucky Kasalirwe (Uganda)
5 September 2025
19:00 UTC+0

Senegal	2–0	Sudan
Koulibaly 14'; P. Sarr 41'	Report

Diamniadio Olympic Stadium, Diamniadio
Referee: Ahmad Heeralall (Mauritius)

9 September 2025
17:00 UTC+1

DR Congo	2–3	Senegal
Bakambu 26'; Wissa 33'	Report	Gueye 39'; Jackson 53'; P. Sarr 87'

Stade des Martyrs, Kinshasa
Referee: Omar Artan (Somalia)
9 September 2025
16:00 UTC+0

Togo	1–0	Sudan
Fofana 6'	Report

Stade de Kégué, Lomé
Referee: Andofetra Rakotojaona (Madagascar)
9 September 2025
19:00 UTC+0

Mauritania	0–0	South Sudan
	Report

Nouadhibou Municipal Stadium, Nouadhibou
Referee: Mehrez Malki (Tunisia)

10 October 2025
15:00 UTC+2

South Sudan	0–5	Senegal
	Report	I. Sarr 29', 54'; Mané 46'; Jackson 60' (pen.); Ndiaye 75'

Juba Stadium, Juba
Referee: Abdou Abdel Mefire (Cameroon)
10 October 2025
13:00 UTC+0

Togo	0–1	DR Congo
	Report	Bakambu 7'

Stade de Kégué, Lomé
Referee: Lenine Dos Santos Rocha (Cape Verde)
10 October 2025
16:00 UTC+3

Sudan	0–0	Mauritania
	Report

Benjamin Mkapa Stadium, Dar es Salaam (Tanzania)
Referee: Jean Ouattara (Burkina Faso)

13 October 2025
15:00 UTC+2

South Sudan	0–0	Togo
	Report

Juba Stadium, Juba
Referee: Lamin Jammeh (Gambia)
14 October 2025
20:00 UTC+1

DR Congo	1–0	Sudan
Bongonda 29'	Report

Stade des Martyrs, Kinshasa
Referee: Abongile Tom (South Africa)
14 October 2025
19:00 UTC+0

Senegal	4–0	Mauritania
Mané 45+1', 48'; Ndiaye 64'; Diallo 85'	Report

Diamniadio Olympic Stadium, Diamniadio
Referee: Mohamed Ali Moussa (Niger)

== Goalscorers ==
There were 57 goals scored in 30 matches, for an average of 1.9 goals per match.

5 goals

- (Senegal national football team) Sadio Mané

4 goals

- (DR Congo national football team) Cédric Bakambu
- (Senegal national football team) Pape Matar Sarr

3 goals

- (DR Congo national football team) Théo Bongonda
- (DR Congo national football team) Yoane Wissa
- (Senegal national football team) Ismaïla Sarr

2 goals

- (DR Congo national football team) Fiston Mayele
- (Senegal national football team) Habib Diallo
- (Senegal national football team) Nicolas Jackson
- (Sudan national football team) Mohamed Eisa
- (Togo national football team) Kévin Denkey

1 goal

- (DR Congo national football team) Meschak Elia
- (DR Congo national football team) Nathanaël Mbuku
- (DR Congo national football team) Charles Pickel
- (Mauritania national football team) Aly Abeid
- (Mauritania national football team) Aboubakary Koïta
- (Mauritania national football team) Abdallahi Mahmoud
- (Mauritania national football team) Papa Ndiaga Yade
- (Senegal national football team) Lamine Camara
- (Senegal national football team) Pape Gueye
- (Senegal national football team) Kalidou Koulibaly
- (Senegal national football team) Cherif Ndiaye
- (Senegal national football team) Iliman Ndiaye
- (South Sudan national football team) Keer Majak
- (South Sudan national football team) Omot Sebit
- (Sudan national football team) Mohamed Abdelrahman
- (Sudan national football team) Walieldin Khedr
- (Sudan national football team) Yaser Muzmel
- (Sudan national football team) Seif Teiri
- (Togo national football team) Sadik Fofana
- (Togo national football team) Thibault Klidjé
- (Togo national football team) Khaled Narey

1 own goal

- (DR Congo national football team) Charles Pickel (against Sudan)
- (Mauritania national football team) Aly Abeid (against Sudan)
- (Togo national football team) Roger Aholou (against South Sudan)
- (Togo national football team) Kévin Boma (against Senegal)

== Discipline ==
A player was automatically suspended for the next match for the following infractions:

- Receiving a red card (red card suspensions could be extended for serious infractions)
- Receiving two yellow cards in two different matches (yellow card suspensions were carried forward to further qualification rounds, but not the finals or any other future international matches)

The following suspensions were served during the group stage:

Team	Player	Infraction(s)	Suspended for match(es)
DR Congo	Arthur Masuaku	(yellow card) vs South Sudan (21 March 2025); (yellow card) vs Mauritania (25 March 2025)	vs South Sudan (5 September 2025)
Mauritania	Guessouma Fofana	(yellow card) vs Senegal (9 June 2024); (yellow card) vs Togo (22 March 2025)	vs DR Congo (25 March 2025)
South Sudan	Majak Mawith	(yellow card) vs Senegal (18 November 2023); (yellow card) vs Mauritania (21 November 2023)	vs Togo (5 June 2024)
South Sudan	William Gama	(yellow card) vs DR Congo (21 March 2025); (yellow card) vs Sudan (25 March 2025)	vs DR Congo (5 September 2025)
Sudan	Salah Adel	(yellow card) vs Togo (16 November 2023); (yellow card) vs DR Congo (19 November 2023)	vs Mauritania (6 June 2024)
Sudan	Ramadan Agab	(yellow card) vs Togo (16 November 2023); (yellow card) vs Mauritania (6 June 2024)	vs South Sudan (11 June 2024)
Togo	Djené	(yellow card) vs Sudan (16 November 2023); (yellow card) vs Senegal (21 November 2023)	vs South Sudan (5 June 2024)
