= 2026 FIFA World Cup qualification =

Association football tournament

Tournament details
- Dates: 7 September 2023 – 31 March 2026
- Teams: 206 (from 6 confederations)

Tournament statistics
- Matches played: 899
- Goals scored: 2,527 (2.81 per match)
- Attendance: 15,626,580 (17,382 per match)
- Top scorer: (Norway) Erling Haaland (16 goals)

The 2026 FIFA World Cup qualification decided the 45 teams that joined hosts Canada, Mexico, and the United States at the 2026 FIFA World Cup.

The qualifying process began on 7 September 2023 with three matches of the CONMEBOL zone played that day. The first goal of the qualification series was scored by Colombian player Rafael Santos Borré against Venezuela. Qualification ended on 31 March 2026.

Cape Verde, Curaçao, Jordan, and Uzbekistan all qualified for the first time, with Curaçao becoming the smallest nation to ever qualify with a population of just 158,000, while Qatar had their first successful qualifying campaign after making their debut in the previous edition as hosts, and Iraq had the longest qualifying campaign, playing 21 matches over a 28-month period to qualify for the World Cup.

== Slot allocation ==
On 30 March 2017, the Bureau of the FIFA Council (composed of the FIFA president and the presidents of each of the six confederations) proposed a slot allocation for the 2026 FIFA World Cup. The recommendation was submitted for ratification by the FIFA Council.

On 9 May 2017, two days before the 67th FIFA Congress, the FIFA Council approved the slot allocation in a meeting in Manama, Bahrain. This included an intercontinental play-off tournament involving six teams to decide the last two FIFA World Cup spots.

The ratification of slot allocation also gave the OFC a guaranteed berth in the final tournament for the first time in FIFA World Cup history; as such, the 2026 FIFA World Cup became the first tournament in which all six confederations had at least one guaranteed berth.

== Qualified teams ==
Team qualified Team eliminated Team withdrew or suspended Not a FIFA member

Team	Method of qualification	Date of qualification	Total times qualified	Last time qualified	Current consecutive appearances	Previous best performance
Canada	Hosts	14 February 2023 (Note: Although the United bid was selected on 13 June 2018, the automatic berths allocated to the hosts were not confirmed until a decision by the FIFA Council on 14 February 2023.)	3	2022	2	Group stage (1986, 2022)
Mexico	Hosts	14 February 2023	18	2022	9	Quarter-finals (1970, 1986)
United States	Hosts	14 February 2023	12	2022	2	Third place (1930)
Japan	AFC third round Group C winners	20 March 2025	8	2022	8	Round of 16 (2002, 2010, 2018, 2022)
New Zealand	OFC third round winners	24 March 2025	3	2010	1	Group stage (1982, 2010)
Iran	AFC third round Group A winners	25 March 2025	7	2022	4	Group stage (1978, 1998, 2006, 2014, 2018, 2022)
Argentina	CONMEBOL winners	25 March 2025	19	2022	14	Winners (1978, 1986, 2022)
Uzbekistan	AFC third round Group A runners-up	5 June 2025	1 (Note: Until 1991, Uzbekistan was part of the Soviet Union, which competed at seven World Cup tournaments but FIFA considers only Russia to be the successor team of the Soviet Union.)	—N/a	1	—N/a
Jordan	AFC third round Group B runners-up	5 June 2025	1	—N/a	1	—N/a
South Korea	AFC third round Group B winners	5 June 2025	12	2022	11	Fourth place (2002)
Australia	AFC third round Group C runners-up	10 June 2025	7	2022	6	Round of 16 (2006, 2022)
Brazil	CONMEBOL fifth place	10 June 2025	23	2022	23	Winners (1958, 1962, 1970, 1994, 2002)
Ecuador	CONMEBOL runners-up	10 June 2025	5	2022	2	Round of 16 (2006)
Paraguay	CONMEBOL sixth place	4 September 2025	9	2010	1	Quarter-finals (2010)
Uruguay	CONMEBOL fourth place	4 September 2025	15	2022	5	Winners (1930, 1950)
Colombia	CONMEBOL third place	4 September 2025	7	2018	1	Quarter-finals (2014)
Morocco	CAF Group E winners	5 September 2025	7	2022	3	Fourth place (2022)
Tunisia	CAF Group H winners	8 September 2025	7	2022	3	Group stage (1978, 1998, 2002, 2006, 2018, 2022)
Egypt	CAF Group A winners	8 October 2025	4	2018	1	First round (Note: The 1934 World Cup was a straight knockout tournament between 16 teams and did not feature a group stage.) (1934), group stage (1990, 2018)
Algeria	CAF Group G winners	9 October 2025	5	2014	1	Round of 16 (2014)
Ghana	CAF Group I winners	12 October 2025	5	2022	2	Quarter-finals (2010)
Cape Verde	CAF Group D winners	13 October 2025	1	—N/a	1	—N/a
Qatar	AFC fourth round Group A winners	14 October 2025	2	2022	2	Group stage (2022)
Saudi Arabia	AFC fourth round Group B winners	14 October 2025	7	2022	3	Round of 16 (1994)
Senegal	CAF Group B winners	14 October 2025	4	2022	3	Quarter-finals (2002)
South Africa	CAF Group C winners	14 October 2025	4	2010	1	Group stage (1998, 2002, 2010)
Ivory Coast	CAF Group F winners	14 October 2025	4	2014	1	Group stage (2006, 2010, 2014)
England	UEFA Group K winners	14 October 2025	17	2022	8	Winners (1966)
France	UEFA Group D winners	13 November 2025	17	2022	8	Winners (1998, 2018)
Croatia	UEFA Group L winners	14 November 2025	7 (Note: Until 1992, Croatia was part of Yugoslavia, which competed at eight World Cup tournaments but FIFA considers only Serbia to be the successor team of Yugoslavia.)	2022	4	Runners-up (2018)
Portugal	UEFA Group F winners	16 November 2025	9	2022	7	Third place (1966)
Norway	UEFA Group I winners	16 November 2025	4	1998	1	Round of 16 (1998)
Germany	UEFA Group A winners	17 November 2025	21 (Note: From 1950 to 1990, Germany competed as West Germany, as a separate East German team existed during that period.)	2022	19	Winners (1954, 1974, 1990, 2014)
Netherlands	UEFA Group G winners	17 November 2025	12	2022	2	Runners-up (1974, 1978, 2010)
Switzerland	UEFA Group B winners	18 November 2025	13	2022	6	Quarter-finals (1934, 1938, 1954)
Scotland	UEFA Group C winners	18 November 2025	10 (Note: Scotland qualified 10 times, but only participated 9 times as they withdrew in 1950.)	1998	1	Group stage (1954, 1958, 1974, 1978, 1982, 1986, 1990, 1998)
Spain	UEFA Group E winners	18 November 2025	17	2022	13	Winners (2010)
Austria	UEFA Group H winners	18 November 2025	9 (Note: Austria qualified 9 times, but only participated 8 times as they withdrew in 1938.)	1998	1	Third place (1954)
Belgium	UEFA Group J winners	18 November 2025	15	2022	4	Third place (2018)
Panama	CONCACAF third round Group A winners	18 November 2025	2	2018	1	Group stage (2018)
Curaçao	CONCACAF third round Group B winners	18 November 2025	1	—N/a	1	—N/a
Haiti	CONCACAF third round Group C winners	18 November 2025	2	1974	1	Group stage (1974)
Bosnia and Herzegovina	UEFA play-offs Path A winners	31 March 2026	2 (Note: Until 1992, Bosnia and Herzegovina was part of Yugoslavia, which competed at eight World Cup tournaments but FIFA considers only Serbia to be the successor team of Yugoslavia.)	2014	1	Group stage (2014)
Sweden	UEFA play-offs Path B winners	31 March 2026	13	2018	1	Runners-up (1958)
Turkey	UEFA play-offs Path C winners	31 March 2026	4 (Note: Turkey qualified 4 times, but only participated 3 times as they withdrew in 1950.)	2002	1	Third place (2002)
Czech Republic	UEFA play-offs Path D winners	31 March 2026	10 (Note: Includes eight appearances by Czechoslovakia, as FIFA considers Czech Republic and Slovakia to be joint successors.)	2006	1	Runners-up (1934, 1962)
DR Congo	Inter-confederation Pathway 1 play-off winners	31 March 2026	2 (Note: From 1970 to 1998, DR Congo competed as Zaire.)	1974	1	Group stage (1974)
Iraq	Inter-confederation Pathway 2 play-off winners	31 March 2026	2	1986	1	Group stage (1986)

=== Qualified teams facts ===
==== Debutants and returnees ====
- Cape Verde, Curaçao, (Note: Curaçao became the smallest country by area and the least populous to qualify for the World Cup. Excluding teams from the United Kingdom, Curaçao was also the first team representing a non-sovereign nation to qualify for the World Cup since the Dutch East Indies (currently Indonesia) in 1938.) Jordan, and Uzbekistan (Note: Until 1991, Uzbekistan was part of the Soviet Union, which competed at seven World Cup tournaments. Following the dissolution of the Soviet Union, Uzbekistan became the third former Soviet republic to compete as an independent nation after Russia (1994, 2002, 2014 and 2018) and Ukraine (2006). FIFA considers Russia to be the successor team of the Soviet Union.) all made their World Cup debuts.
- Qatar advanced to the tournament through qualification for the first time, as it automatically qualified as host in 2022.
- DR Congo (Note: From 1970 to 1998, DR Congo competed as Zaire. This was the first time the country competed under DR Congo.) and Haiti returned to the tournament after appearing in their only previous tournament in 1974.
- Iraq returned to the tournament after appearing in their only previous tournament in 1986.
- Austria, Norway, and Scotland returned to the tournament after last appearing in 1998.
- Turkey qualified for the first time since finishing third in 2002.
- Czech Republic (Note: Until 1992, the Czech Republic was part of Czechoslovakia, which competed in eight World Cup tournaments. Following its dissolution, the Czech Republic qualified for the tournament for the second time as an independent nation, having previously debuted in 2006.) qualified for the first time since 2006.
- New Zealand, Paraguay, and South Africa (2010 World Cup host) returned after last taking part in 2010. South Africa advanced to the tournament through qualification for the first time since 2002, while New Zealand was the lowest ranked team to qualify, ranked 85th.
- Algeria, Bosnia and Herzegovina, and Ivory Coast qualified for the first time since 2014. The Bosnians achieved their first successful qualification process for a major tournament since the 2014 World Cup.
- Colombia, Egypt, Panama, and Sweden made a return after missing out in 2022.

==== Absentees ====
- Italy missed out after being defeated in the European playoff final by Bosnia and Herzegovina on penalties, becoming the first former champion to miss out on three consecutive World Cups. Similar to 2018 and 2022, Italy was the only former champion that did not qualify.
- Chile, who last qualified in 2014, failed to advance for the third consecutive time, in a similar way to Italy, being the second time the country did not qualify to three consecutive World Cups after failing from 1986 to 1994.
- Nigeria, who last qualified in 2018, failed to advance after losing to DR Congo on penalties in the final match of the CAF play-offs. This marked the first time the country failed to qualify for consecutive World Cups since before their first successful qualification in 1994.
- Cameroon, Costa Rica, Denmark, Poland, Serbia, and Wales, all of whom qualified in 2022, also did not qualify for the 2026 tournament.

==== Other ====
- Uzbekistan became the first country from Central Asia to take part in the FIFA World Cup.
- Iraq's successful qualification campaign for the 2026 World Cup was considered one of the longest ever by a national team, spanning 21 matches over a period of 28 months.
- This was the first time that two Caribbean nations (Curaçao and Haiti) qualified for the World Cup.
- This was the first time that eight Arab nations (Algeria, Egypt, Iraq, Jordan, Morocco, Qatar, Saudi Arabia, and Tunisia) qualified for the World Cup, an increase from four teams in 2018 and 2022.
- Sweden advanced to the tournament via the play-offs, becoming the first European nation to qualify for the World Cup after only reaching the play-offs through the UEFA Nations League.
- As of 1 April 2026, the highest ranked team not to qualify was Italy (ranked 12th), while the lowest ranked team that did qualify was New Zealand (ranked 85th).

== Qualification process ==
On 9 May 2017, the FIFA Council approved the slot allocation scheme for the new 48-team final format.

=== Summary of qualification ===
Confederation	Direct slots	Change from 2022	Play-off slots	Teams started	Teams eliminated	Teams qualified	Qualifying start date	Qualifying end date
AFC	8	+3	1	46	37	9	12 October 2023	18 November 2025
CAF	9	+4	1	53	43	10	15 November 2023	16 November 2025
CONCACAF	3+3 (hosts)	+3	2	32+3 (hosts)	29	3+3 (hosts)	22 March 2024	18 November 2025
CONMEBOL	6	+2	1	10	4	6	7 September 2023	9 September 2025
OFC	1	+1	1	11	10	1	6 September 2024	24 March 2025
UEFA	16	+3	0	54	38	16	21 March 2025	31 March 2026
Play-offs	2	—	—N/a	(6)	(4)	(2)	26 March 2026	31 March 2026
Total	45+3 (hosts)	+16	6	206+3 (hosts)	161	45+3	7 September 2023	31 March 2026

=== Suspensions and withdrawals ===
Russia were suspended indefinitely on 28 February 2022 from participating in UEFA and FIFA competitions due to the country's invasion of Ukraine. A circular distributed by UEFA on 11 November 2024 stated 192 group stage matches would take place, confirming Russia's exclusion from the tournament.

Sri Lanka were suspended in January 2023 for an unspecified reason, and they did not appear in the draw information the AFC released in early July. However, the suspension was lifted on the condition that their federation would hold elections at least ten days before qualification would begin.

Eritrea withdrew from qualification on 10 November 2023, prior to playing any matches, due to concerns that players would seek political asylum if allowed to travel overseas.

Congo were suspended on 6 February 2025 for government interference in Congolese Football Federation operations. No announcement regarding their status was immediately available, and CAF initially cancelled their remaining matches. The suspension was lifted by FIFA on 14 May 2025, and Tanzania and Zambia were awarded 3–0 victories by forfeit.

== Format ==
Each confederation was responsible for its own qualification tournament, which consisted of at least one round of competition using the following formats (Regulations Article 11.3):

- A double round-robin (or "league") format in which each team in a group played all other teams in their group twice – once at home and once away.
- A single round-robin format in which each team in a group played all other teams in their group once, with the venues either drawn at random or assigned by the confederation with the agreement of the playing associations.
- A knockout format in which each team in a round played one other team over two legs – once at home and once away.
- With FIFA's permission, a tournament held in one of the participating nations or in neutral territory.
- With FIFA's permission, a single-leg knockout format.

=== Tiebreakers ===
In the round-robin and tournament formats, the tiebreaker criteria were as follows (Regulations Article 11.5):

1. Greatest number of points obtained in all group matches (3 for a win, 1 for a draw, 0 for a loss)
2. Greatest goal differential in all group matches
3. Most goals scored in all group matches

Should two or more teams still have equal rank after criteria 1–3 were applied, then the following criteria were used:

4. Greatest number of points obtained in all matches amongst the concerned teams
5. Greatest goal differential in all matches amongst the concerned teams
6. Most goals scored in all matches amongst the concerned teams
7. Most goals scored away from home in all matches amongst the concerned teams
8. The best team conduct score using the following table:
  1. First yellow card: –1 point
  2. Second yellow card/indirect red card: –3 points
  3. Direct red card: –4 points
  4. Yellow card and direct red card: –5 points
  Only one score was applied to any player or team official in any match, e.g. a player who received a second yellow card would only have –3 points applied and not –4 (–1 for the first and –3 for the second).
9. Drawing of lots by FIFA

If the tournament were held in a single host nation or in neutral territory, then criterion 7 would not be applied (Regulations Article 11.6).

In the home-and-away knockout format, the team scoring more goals on aggregate won the tie and advanced. If the aggregate score were level, then 30 minutes of extra time would be played. If the score were still level at the end of extra time, the away goals rule would not be applied and the winners would be decided by a penalty shoot-out (Regulations Article 11.9). In the single-leg knockout format, the team scoring more goals in a single match wins and advances. If the teams were tied after regulation, then extra time was played, followed by a penalty shoot-out if the score was still level (Regulations Article 11.10).

== Confederation qualification ==
=== AFC ===
On 1 August 2022, the Asian Football Confederation Executive Committee approved the qualification format for Asia's road to the 2026 World Cup, as well as the 2027 AFC Asian Cup, in preparation for the eight direct spots and the single intercontinental play-off slot allocated to the AFC by FIFA following the expansion of the FIFA World Cup to 48 teams. The draw for the first round was held on 27 July 2023 at the AFC House in Kuala Lumpur, Malaysia. The draw for the second round took place two hours later.

The qualification structure was as follows:

- First round: Twenty teams (ranked 27–46) played home-and-away over two legs. The ten winners advanced to the second round.
- Second round: Thirty-six teams (those ranked 1–26 and the ten first-round winners) were divided into nine groups of four teams to play home-and-away round-robin matches. The eighteen group winners and group runners-up advanced to the third round.
- Third round: The eighteen teams that advanced from the second round were divided into three groups of six teams to play home-and-away round-robin matches. The top two teams of each group qualified for the World Cup, while the third-placed and fourth-placed teams of each group advanced to the fourth round.
- Fourth round: The six teams that advanced from the third round were drawn into two groups of three teams each to play a single round-robin. The winners qualified for the World Cup, and the runners-up advanced to the fifth round.
- Fifth round: The fourth round group runners-up competed in a two-legged play-off tie that determined the Asian representation at the inter-confederation play-offs.

==== Final positions (third round) ====
Legend
Qualified for the 2026 FIFA World Cup
Advanced to the fourth round

Group A
Pos	Team	Pld	Pts
1	Iran	10	23
2	Uzbekistan	10	21
3	United Arab Emirates	10	15
4	Qatar	10	13
5	Kyrgyzstan	10	8
6	North Korea	10	3

Source: AFC, FIFA

Group B
Pos	Team	Pld	Pts
1	South Korea	10	22
2	Jordan	10	16
3	Iraq	10	15
4	Oman	10	11
5	Palestine	10	10
6	Kuwait	10	5

Source: AFC, FIFA

Group C
Pos	Team	Pld	Pts
1	Japan	10	23
2	Australia	10	19
3	Saudi Arabia	10	13
4	Indonesia	10	12
5	China	10	9
6	Bahrain	10	6

Source: AFC, FIFA

==== Final positions (fourth round) ====
Legend
Qualified for the 2026 FIFA World Cup
Advanced to the fifth round

Group A
Pos	Team	Pld	Pts
1	Qatar (H)	2	4
2	United Arab Emirates	2	3
3	Oman	2	1

Source: AFC
(H) Hosts

Group B
Pos	Team	Pld	Pts
1	Saudi Arabia (H)	2	4
2	Iraq	2	4
3	Indonesia	2	0

Source: AFC
(H) Hosts

==== Final positions (fifth round) ====
The winner advanced to the inter-confederation play-offs.

Team 1	Agg.	Team 2	1st leg	2nd leg
United Arab Emirates	2–3	Iraq	1–1	1–2

=== CAF ===
The CAF Executive Committee announced a new African qualification format on 19 May 2023. The draw was held on 13 July 2023 in Abidjan, Ivory Coast. All 54 FIFA-affiliated football associations from CAF entered qualification. Eritrea withdrew before matches began due to fears that players would seek political asylum abroad.

The qualification structure was as follows:

- First round: Teams were drawn into nine groups of six teams to play home-and-away round-robin matches. The winner of each group qualified for the World Cup.
- Second round: The four best-ranked group runners-up participated in a play-off to determine which team would advance to the inter-confederation play-offs.

==== Final positions (first round) ====
Legend
Qualified for the 2026 FIFA World Cup
Advanced to the second round
Withdrew

Group A
Pos	Team	Pld	Pts
1	Egypt	10	26
2	Burkina Faso	10	21
3	Sierra Leone	10	15
4	Guinea-Bissau	10	10
5	Ethiopia	10	9
6	Djibouti	10	1

Source: FIFA

Group B
Pos	Team	Pld	Pts
1	Senegal	10	24
2	DR Congo	10	22
3	Sudan	10	13
4	Togo	10	8
5	Mauritania	10	7
6	South Sudan	10	5

Source: FIFA

Group C
Pos	Team	Pld	Pts
1	South Africa	10	18
2	Nigeria	10	17
3	Benin	10	17
4	Lesotho	10	12
5	Rwanda	10	11
6	Zimbabwe	10	5

Source: FIFA

Group D
Pos	Team	Pld	Pts
1	Cape Verde	10	23
2	Cameroon	10	19
3	Libya	10	16
4	Angola	10	12
5	Mauritius	10	6
6	Eswatini	10	3

Source: FIFA

Group E
Pos	Team	Pld	Pts
1	Morocco	8	24
2	Niger	8	15
3	Tanzania	8	10
4	Zambia	8	9
5	Congo	8	1
6	Eritrea	0	0

Source: FIFA

Group F
Pos	Team	Pld	Pts
1	Ivory Coast	10	26
2	Gabon	10	25
3	Gambia	10	13
4	Kenya	10	12
5	Burundi	10	10
6	Seychelles	10	0

Source: FIFA

Group G
Pos	Team	Pld	Pts
1	Algeria	10	25
2	Uganda	10	18
3	Mozambique	10	18
4	Guinea	10	15
5	Botswana	10	10
6	Somalia	10	1

Source: FIFA

Group H
Pos	Team	Pld	Pts
1	Tunisia	10	28
2	Namibia	10	15
3	Liberia	10	15
4	Malawi	10	13
5	Equatorial Guinea	10	11
6	São Tomé and Príncipe	10	3

Source: FIFA

Group I
Pos	Team	Pld	Pts
1	Ghana	10	25
2	Madagascar	10	19
3	Mali	10	18
4	Comoros	10	15
5	Central African Republic	10	8
6	Chad	10	1

Source: FIFA

Due to Eritrea's withdrawal from qualification resulting in differing group sizes, results from matches against sixth-place teams were discounted when ranking group runners-up.

Ranking of runners-up
Pos	Team	Pld	Pts
1	Gabon	8	19
2	DR Congo	8	16
3	Cameroon	8	15
4	Nigeria	8	15
5	Burkina Faso	8	15
6	Niger	8	15
7	Madagascar	8	13
8	Uganda	8	12
9	Namibia	8	9

Source: FIFA

==== Final positions (second round) ====
The teams were allocated into semi-finals based on their FIFA Men's World Ranking of 17 October 2025, with the highest-ranked side taking on the lowest and the second-highest taking on the third-highest.

The winner advanced to the inter-confederation play-offs.

Semi-finals
13 November 2025 – Rabat (Hassan)
Nigeria (a.e.t.)	4
Gabon	1
13 November 2025 – Rabat (Al Barid)
Cameroon	0
DR Congo	1

Final
16 November 2025 – Rabat (Hassan)
Nigeria	1 (3)
DR Congo (p)	1 (4)

=== CONCACAF ===
Three teams in CONCACAF—Canada, Mexico and the United States—automatically qualified as host nations. On 28 February 2023, CONCACAF announced the qualifying format for 2026 World Cup qualification.

- First round: Four CONCACAF teams, ranked 29 to 32 based on the FIFA ranking of December 2023, were divided into two matchups to be played on a two-legged home-and-away basis. The two winners advanced to the second round.
- Second round: Thirty teams – the two winners from the first round and CONCACAF teams ranked 1 to 28 based on the FIFA ranking of December 2023 – were drawn into six groups of five teams. They played single round-robin matches (two home and two away), with group winners and runners-up advancing to the third round.
- Third round: The twelve teams that advanced from the second round were drawn into three groups of four teams. They played double round-robin home-and-away matches, with the three group winners qualifying for the World Cup. The two best-ranked runners-up advanced to the inter-confederation play-offs.

==== Final positions (third round) ====
Legend
Qualified for the 2026 FIFA World Cup
Advanced to the inter-confederation play-offs

Group A
Pos	Team	Pld	Pts
1	Panama	6	12
2	Suriname	6	9
3	Guatemala	6	8
4	El Salvador	6	3

Source: FIFA

Group B
Pos	Team	Pld	Pts
1	Curaçao	6	12
2	Jamaica	6	11
3	Trinidad and Tobago	6	7
4	Bermuda	6	1

Source: FIFA

Group C
Pos	Team	Pld	Pts
1	Haiti	6	11
2	Honduras	6	9
3	Costa Rica	6	7
4	Nicaragua	6	4

Source: FIFA

Ranking of runners-up
Pos	Team	Pld	Pts
1	Jamaica	6	11
2	Suriname	6	9
3	Honduras	6	9

Source: FIFA

=== CONMEBOL ===
On 22 August 2022, CONMEBOL petitioned FIFA to keep the qualification format which had been used since the 1998 FIFA World Cup qualification, where all CONMEBOL members play home-and-away round-robin matches against each other. This was approved, with the first games of the qualifiers played in September 2023.

Before the qualification competition began, Ecuador were penalized 3 points for using falsified birth documents for Byron Castillo in the previous World Cup qualification cycle.

==== Final positions ====
Legend
Qualified for the 2026 FIFA World Cup
Advanced to the inter-confederation play-offs

Pos	Team	Pld	Pts
1	Argentina	18	38
2	Ecuador	18	29
3	Colombia	18	28
4	Uruguay	18	28
5	Brazil	18	28
6	Paraguay	18	28
7	Bolivia	18	20
8	Venezuela	18	18
9	Peru	18	12
10	Chile	18	11

Source: FIFA

=== OFC ===
The 2026 World Cup marked the first time OFC was granted one guaranteed slot, as well as a possible second slot via the inter-confederation play-offs.

The qualification structure was as follows:

- First round: The four lowest-ranked teams played a three-match knockout round in September 2024. The winner, Samoa, advanced to the second round.
- Second round: The winning team from the first round joined the seven highest-ranked teams in two four-team groups in October and November 2024. The top two teams from each group advanced to the third round.
- Third round: The four teams advancing from the second round played a three-match knockout round in March 2025. The winner, New Zealand, qualified for the World Cup, and the runner-up, New Caledonia, advanced to the inter-confederation play-offs.

==== Final positions (third round) ====
The winner qualified for the World Cup, while the runner-up advanced to the inter-confederation play-offs.

Semi-finals
21 March 2025 – Wellington
New Caledonia	3
Tahiti	0
21 March 2025 – Wellington
New Zealand	7
Fiji	0

Final
24 March 2025 – Auckland
New Caledonia	0
New Zealand	3

=== UEFA ===
The UEFA Executive Committee announced a new European qualification format on 25 January 2023. Teams were drawn into twelve groups of four or five teams to play home-and-away round-robin matches from March to November 2025. The group winners qualified for the World Cup, while the runners-up participated in play-off matches, for a total of 16 teams qualifying for the finals.

The qualification draw took place on 13 December 2024 in Zurich, Switzerland. Due to the Russian invasion of Ukraine, Russia's national team was suspended, and their exclusion was confirmed in a circular distributed by UEFA on 11 November 2024.

- First round (group stage): Twelve groups of either four or five teams were drawn, with group winners qualifying for the World Cup.
- Second round (play-off): Sixteen teams (twelve group runners-up and the four best Nations League group winners, based on the 2024–25 Nations League overall ranking, that finished outside the top two of their qualifying group) were drawn into four play-off paths, playing two rounds of single-match play-offs (semi-finals with the seeded teams hosting, followed by finals, with the home teams drawn from the semi-final pairings). The four path winners qualified for the World Cup.

==== Final positions (first round) ====
Legend
Qualified for the 2026 FIFA World Cup
Advanced to the second round

Group A
Pos	Team	Pld	Pts
1	Germany	6	15
2	Slovakia	6	12
3	Northern Ireland	6	9
4	Luxembourg	6	0

Source: FIFA, UEFA

Group B
Pos	Team	Pld	Pts
1	Switzerland	6	14
2	Kosovo	6	11
3	Slovenia	6	4
4	Sweden	6	2

Source: FIFA, UEFA

Group C
Pos	Team	Pld	Pts
1	Scotland	6	13
2	Denmark	6	11
3	Greece	6	7
4	Belarus	6	2

Source: FIFA, UEFA

Group D
Pos	Team	Pld	Pts
1	France	6	16
2	Ukraine	6	10
3	Iceland	6	7
4	Azerbaijan	6	1

Source: FIFA, UEFA

Group E
Pos	Team	Pld	Pts
1	Spain	6	16
2	Turkey	6	13
3	Georgia	6	3
4	Bulgaria	6	3

Source: FIFA, UEFA

Group F
Pos	Team	Pld	Pts
1	Portugal	6	13
2	Republic of Ireland	6	10
3	Hungary	6	8
4	Armenia	6	3

Source: FIFA, UEFA

Group G
Pos	Team	Pld	Pts
1	Netherlands	8	20
2	Poland	8	17
3	Finland	8	10
4	Malta	8	5
5	Lithuania	8	3

Source: FIFA, UEFA

Group H
Pos	Team	Pld	Pts
1	Austria	8	19
2	Bosnia and Herzegovina	8	17
3	Romania	8	13
4	Cyprus	8	8
5	San Marino	8	0

Source: FIFA, UEFA

Group I
Pos	Team	Pld	Pts
1	Norway	8	24
2	Italy	8	18
3	Israel	8	12
4	Estonia	8	4
5	Moldova	8	1

Source: FIFA, UEFA

Group J
Pos	Team	Pld	Pts
1	Belgium	8	18
2	Wales	8	16
3	North Macedonia	8	13
4	Kazakhstan	8	8
5	Liechtenstein	8	0

Source: FIFA, UEFA

Group K
Pos	Team	Pld	Pts
1	England	8	24
2	Albania	8	14
3	Serbia	8	13
4	Latvia	8	5
5	Andorra	8	1

Source: FIFA, UEFA

Group L
Pos	Team	Pld	Pts
1	Croatia	8	22
2	Czech Republic	8	16
3	Faroe Islands	8	12
4	Montenegro	8	9
5	Gibraltar	8	0

Source: FIFA, UEFA

==== Final positions (second round) ====
The winners of each path qualified for the World Cup.

Path A

Semi-finals
26 March 2026 – Cardiff
Wales	1 (2)
Bosnia and Herzegovina (p)	1 (4)
26 March 2026 – Bergamo
Italy	2
Northern Ireland	0

Final
31 March 2026 – Zenica
Bosnia and Herzegovina (p)	1 (4)
Italy	1 (1)

Path B

Semi-finals
26 March 2026 – Valencia
Ukraine	1
Sweden	3
26 March 2026 – Warsaw
Poland	2
Albania	1

Final
31 March 2026 – Solna
Sweden	3
Poland	2

Path C

Semi-finals
26 March 2026 – Bratislava
Slovakia	3
Kosovo	4
26 March 2026 – Istanbul
Turkey	1
Romania	0

Final
31 March 2026 – Pristina
Kosovo	0
Turkey	1

Path D

Semi-finals
26 March 2026 – Prague
Czech Republic (p)	2 (4)
Republic of Ireland	2 (3)
26 March 2026 – Copenhagen
Denmark	4
North Macedonia	0

Final
31 March 2026 – Prague
Czech Republic (p)	2 (3)
Denmark	2 (1)

== Inter-confederation play-offs ==
A play-off tournament involving six teams – one each from AFC, CAF, CONMEBOL, and OFC and two from CONCACAF – was held to decide two FIFA World Cup berths. The bottom four teams in the November 2025 FIFA World Rankings were drawn into two single-elimination matches. The winners of those matches advanced to play the top two teams in a further round of single-elimination matches, and the winners qualified for the World Cup. The play-offs were held in March 2026 in Guadalajara and Monterrey in Mexico.

Semi-final
26 March 2026 – Zapopan
New Caledonia	0
Jamaica	1

Final
31 March 2026 – Zapopan
DR Congo (a.e.t.)	1
Jamaica	0

Semi-final
26 March 2026 – Guadalupe
Bolivia	2
Suriname	1

Final
31 March 2026 – Guadalupe
Iraq	2
Bolivia	1

== Top goalscorers ==
There were 2,527 goals scored in 899 matches, for an average of 2.81 goals per match.

16 goals

- (Norway) Erling Haaland

12 goals

- (Qatar) Almoez Ali

10 goals

- (Algeria) Mohamed Amoura
- (Iran) Mehdi Taremi
- (South Korea) Son Heung-min

9 goals

- (Egypt) Mohamed Salah
- (Iraq) Aymen Hussein
- (Jordan) Ali Olwan
- (New Zealand) Chris Wood

8 goals

- (Argentina) Lionel Messi
- (Austria) Marko Arnautović
- (Bolivia) Miguel Terceros
- (England) Harry Kane
- (Gabon) Denis Bouanga
- (Iran) Sardar Azmoun
- (Japan) Ayase Ueda
- (Jordan) Yazan Al-Naimat
- (Mali) Kamory Doumbia
- (Netherlands) Memphis Depay
- (Nigeria) Victor Osimhen
- (United Arab Emirates) Fábio Lima

Below are goalscorer lists for all confederations and the inter-confederation play-offs:

- AFC
- CAF
- CONCACAF
- CONMEBOL
- OFC
- UEFA
- Inter-confederation play-offs

== See also ==
- 2027 FIFA Women's World Cup qualification
