= Imourane Hassane =

Beninese footballer (born 2003)

Personal information
- Date of birth: 8 April 2003 (age 23)
- Place of birth: Savalou, Benin
- Height: 1.82 m (6 ft 0 in)
- Position: Defensive midfielder

Team information
- Current team: Grasshopper
- Number: 5

Youth career
- Académie Poté Joseph
- Soleil FC
- 2020–2022: SCC Mohammédia

Senior career*
Years	Team	Apps	(Gls)
2022–2025	Loto-Popo		
2023–2024	→ Modern Future FC (loan)	16	(0)
2025	→ Grasshopper (loan)	14	(0)
2025–	Grasshopper	36	(1)

International career^{‡}
2023	Benin U20	4	(0)
2023–	Benin	36	(3)
- * Club domestic league appearances and goals as of 28 September 2026 ‡ National team caps and goals as of 12 November 2026

Imourane Hassane (born 8 April 2003) is a Beninese professional footballer who plays as a defensive midfielder for Swiss Super League club Grasshopper and the Benin national team.

== Club career ==
Hassane is a product of the youth academy of the Beninese clubs Académie Poté Joseph and Soleil FC, before moving to SCC Mohammédia to finish his development on 4 December 2020. In 2022, he moved to the Grand-Popo-based club Loto-Popo in the Benin Premier League. On 14 July 2023, he moved to the Egyptian Premier League side Modern Future FC on a year-long loan. On 22 August 2024, it was announced Hassane was loaned to Swiss Super League side Grasshopper. However, due to a contract dispute with Modern Future, he returned to Loto-Popo in September 2024, without playing for Grasshopper.

On 6 January 2025, he joined Grasshopper on loan for the remainder of the 2024–25 season with an option to buy. He debuted on 25 January 2025, coming on in the final minutes of a 0–0 draw against Young Boys. A week later, he started and played the full 90 minutes at left-back in a 2–2 draw against Lausanne-Sport. On 11 April 2025, Grasshoppers activated their option, signing Imourane until 2028. On 25 April 2026, he scored his first goal for the Swiss record champions, helping them take the lead in an eventual 1–2 home loss to Luzern.

== International career ==
Hassane was called up to the Benin national under-20 football team by Mathias Déguénon for the 2023 U-20 Africa Cup of Nations. That same year he was called up to the senior Benin national team. He also called up for 2026 FIFA World Cup qualification matches in March 2025. On 3 December 2025, he was included in Benin's provisional 30-man squad ahead of the 2025 Africa Cup of Nations.

=== International goals ===
As of match played 12 November 2026

Appearances and goals by national team and year
National team	Year	Apps	Goals
Benin	2023	5	0
Benin	2024	10	1
Benin	2025	11	1
Benin	2026	9	1
Total		35	3

Scores and results list Benin's goal tally first.

No.	Date	Venue	Opponent	Score	Result	Competition
1.	11 October 2024	Stade Félix Houphouët-Boigny, Abidjan, Ivory Coast	Rwanda	3–0	3–0	2025 Africa Cup of Nations qualification
2.	9 September 2025	Stade Félix Houphouët-Boigny, Abidjan, Ivory Coast	Lesotho	3–0	4–0	2026 FIFA World Cup qualification
3.	12 November 2026	Stade Félix Houphouët-Boigny, Abidjan, Ivory Coast	Central African Republic	1–0	4–1	2027 Africa Cup of Nations qualification
