= 2026 FIFA World Cup qualification – CAF second round =

The CAF second round of the qualification tournament for the 2026 FIFA World Cup, also known as the CAF play-offs, was contested by four teams from the CAF segment of qualifying. The best four runners-up from the CAF first round groups participated in the play-offs, with the winner advancing to the inter-confederation play-offs. The second round featured two single-leg semi-finals and one single-leg final, with all matches played in Morocco from 13 to 16 November 2025.The DR Congo won the round and advanced to the final tournament after defeating Jamaica in the inter-confederation play-offs.

== Qualified teams ==
The four best runners-up from the first round advanced to the second round. Results against sixth-place teams were discounted due to the differing group sizes as a result of Eritrea's withdrawal.

Pos	Grp	Team	Pld	W	D	L	GF	GA	GD	Pts	Qualification
1	F	Gabon	8	6	1	1	15	9	+6	19	Second round
2	B	DR Congo	8	5	1	2	10	5	+5	16	Second round
3	D	Cameroon	8	4	3	1	14	5	+9	15	Second round
4	C	Nigeria	8	4	3	1	13	6	+7	15	Second round
5	A	Burkina Faso	8	4	3	1	13	7	+6	15	
6	E	Niger	8	5	0	3	11	10	+1	15	
7	I	Madagascar	8	4	1	3	11	11	0	13	
8	G	Uganda	8	4	0	4	11	9	+2	12	
9	H	Namibia	8	2	3	3	8	10	−2	9	

Source: FIFA
Rules for classification: Tiebreakers

== Format ==
Teams were seeded based on the FIFA Men's World Ranking of 17 October 2025, shown below in brackets, with the first and second teams playing the fourth and third teams, respectively, in a single-leg knockout round with the semi-finals on 13 November and the final on 16 November 2025. All matches were played in Morocco, with a draw on 30 October 2025 determining the semi-final venue assignments. The winner of the final advanced to the inter-confederation play-offs in March 2026.

If scores were level at the end of regulation, 30 minutes of extra time were played, where each team was allowed a sixth substitution. If the scores remained tied, a penalty shoot-out was used to determine the winner.

Seeding
Semi-final 1	Semi-final 2
1. Nigeria (41); 4. Gabon (77)	2. Cameroon (54); 3. DR Congo (60)

== Bracket ==
Semi-finals
13 November 2025 – Rabat (Hassan)
Nigeria (a.e.t.)	4
Gabon	1
13 November 2025 – Rabat (Al Barid)
Cameroon	0
DR Congo	1

Final
16 November 2025 – Rabat (Hassan)
Nigeria	1 (3)
DR Congo (p)	1 (4)

== Summary ==
Team 1	Score	Team 2
Semi-finals
Nigeria	4–1 (a.e.t.)	Gabon
Cameroon	0–1	DR Congo
Final
Nigeria	1–1 (a.e.t.) (3–4 p)	DR Congo

== Semi-finals ==
13 November 2025
17:00 UTC+1

Nigeria	4–1 (a.e.t.)	Gabon
Adams 78'; Ejuke 97'; Osimhen 102', 110'	Report	M. Lemina 89'

Moulay Hassan Stadium, Rabat
Attendance: 2,500
Referee: Abongile Tom (South Africa)

13 November 2025
20:00 UTC+1

Cameroon	0–1	DR Congo
	Report	Mbemba 90+1'

Al Medina Stadium, Rabat
Attendance: 10,000
Referee: Mahmood Ismail (Sudan)

== Final ==
The winner, DR Congo, advanced to the inter-confederation play-offs.

16 November 2025
20:00 UTC+1

Nigeria	1–1 (a.e.t.)	DR Congo
Onyeka 3'	Report	Elia 32'
Penalties
Bassey (penalty missed); Simon (penalty missed); Adams (penalty scored); Onyemaechi (penalty scored); Ejuke (penalty scored); Ajayi (penalty missed)	3–4	(penalty missed) Moutoussamy; (penalty scored) Sadiki; (penalty missed) Tuanzebe; (penalty scored) Mayele; (penalty scored) Balikwisha; (penalty scored) Mbemba

Moulay Hassan Stadium, Rabat
Referee: Jalal Jayed (Morocco)

== Goalscorers ==
There were 8 goals scored in 3 matches, for an average of 2.67 goals per match.

2 goals

- (Nigeria national football team) Victor Osimhen

1 goal

- (DR Congo national football team) Meschak Elia
- (DR Congo national football team) Chancel Mbemba
- (Gabon national football team) Mario Lemina
- (Nigeria national football team) Akor Adams
- (Nigeria national football team) Chidera Ejuke
- (Nigeria national football team) Frank Onyeka

== Discipline ==
A player was automatically suspended for the next match for the following offences:

- Receiving a red card (red card suspensions could be extended for serious offences)
- Receiving two yellow cards in two different qualifying group stage matches (yellow card suspensions were carried forward to the play-off semi-finals, but not the play-off finals, World Cup final tournament or any other future international matches)

Yellow cards received during the qualifying group stage expired prior to the CAF play-offs, thus preventing suspensions in the play-off finals due to yellow cards received in the semi-finals. However, yellow card suspensions accumulated at the end of the qualifying group stage were still carried forward to the play-off semi-finals.

The following suspensions were served during the second round qualifying matches:

Team	Player	Offence(s)	Suspended for match(es)
DR Congo	Meschak Elia	(yellow card) vs Senegal (6 June 2024); (yellow card) vs Sudan (14 October 2025)	vs Cameroon (13 November 2025)
Gabon	Mick Onfia	(yellow card) vs Seychelles (3 September 2025); (yellow card) vs Burundi (14 October 2025)	vs Nigeria (13 November 2025)
Nigeria	Semi Ajayi	(yellow card) vs Lesotho (16 November 2023); (yellow card) vs Benin (14 October 2025)	vs Gabon (13 November 2025)
