= Yannick Semedo =

Cape Verdean footballer (born 1995)

Personal information
- Full name: Jair Semedo Monteiro
- Date of birth: 29 December 1995 (age 30)
- Place of birth: Praia, Cape Verde
- Height: 1.71 m (5 ft 7 in)
- Position: Midfielder

Team information
- Current team: Al-Jabalain
- Number: 8

Senior career*
Years	Team	Apps	(Gls)
2013–2014	GDR Celtic Praia		
2014–2015	GD São Roque		
2015–2018	Marítimo B	1	(0)
2018–2019	União Madeira	31	(1)
2019–2020	Beira-Mar	25	(2)
2020–2022	Salgueiros	43	(2)
2022–2024	Vilaverdense	41	(4)
2024–2025	Santa Clara	11	(0)
2024–2025	→ Vizela (loan)	31	(2)
2025–2026	Farense	29	(0)
2026–	Al-Jabalain	5	(1)

International career^{‡}
2022–	Cape Verde	13	(1)
- * Club domestic league appearances and goals as of 13 September 2026 ‡ National team caps and goals as of 4 July 2026

Jair Semedo Monteiro (Portuguese: [ʒɐ.ˈiɾ sɨ.ˈme.du mõ.ˈtej.ɾu]; born 29 December 1995), known as Yannick Semedo (Portuguese: [ja.ˈnik sɨ.ˈme.du]), is a Cape Verdean professional footballer who plays as a midfielder for Saudi First Division League club Al-Jabalain and the Cape Verde national team.

== Club career ==
Semedo began his senior career in Cape Verde with GDR Celtic Praia in 2013. The following season, he moved to Portugal with GD São Roque in the Portuguese fifth division. His season there earned him a move to the Marítimo reserves on 27 August 2015, where he stayed 3 seasons in the Campeonato de Portugal. He stayed in the CDP for 4 more seasons with União Madeira, Beira-Mar and Salgueiros respectively. On 13 July 2022, he moved to Vilaverdense in the Liga 3, and in his debut season earned them promotion to the Liga Portugal 2. He extended his contract with the club on 7 July 2023 for 3 seasons. On 29 December 2023, he terminated his contract with Vilaverdense after the club failed to pay his wages.

On 3 January 2024, Semedo moved to Santa Clara on a 1.5 year contract, and helped them win the 2023–24 Liga Portugal 2. On 2 July 2024, he joined Vizela on a loan until 2025.

On 17 July 2025, Semedo signed with Farense.

== International career ==
Semedo debuted with the Cape Verde national team in a 1–0 friendly loss to Ecuador on 11 June 2022.

On 18 May 2026, he was called up by Cape Verde's head coach Bubista for the 2026 FIFA World Cup.

== Career statistics ==
=== Club ===
As of match played 17 May 2026

Appearances and goals by club, season and competition
Club	Season	League			National cup		League cup		Continental		Other		Total	
Club	Season	Division	Apps	Goals	Apps	Goals	Apps	Goals	Apps	Goals	Apps	Goals	Apps	Goals
Marítimo B	2015–16	Campeonato de Portugal	1	0	—		—		—		—		1	0
União Madeira	2018–19	Campeonato de Portugal	31	1	4	0	—		—		—		35	1
Beira-Mar	2019–20	AFA Division 1	25	2	2	0	—		—		—		27	2
Salgueiros	2020–21	Campeonato de Portugal	21	2	2	1	—		—		—		23	3
Salgueiros	2021–22	Liga 3	22	2	1	0	—		—		—		23	2
Salgueiros	Total		43	4	3	1	—		—		—		46	5
Vilaverdense	2022–23	Liga 3	26	3	5	2	—		—		2 (Note: Appearances in promotion play-offs)	0	33	5
Vilaverdense	2023–24	Liga Portugal 2	15	1	3	0	1	0	—		—		19	1
Vilaverdense	Total		41	4	8	2	1	0	—		2	0	52	6
Santa Clara	2023–24	Liga Portugal 2	11	0	2	0	—		—		—		13	0
Vizela (loan)	2024–25	Liga Portugal 2	31	2	1	0	—		—		2 (Note: Appearances in promotion play-offs)	0	34	2
Farense	2025–26	Liga Portugal 2	29	0	0	0	—		—		2 (Note: Appearances in promotion play-offs)	0	31	0
Career total			212	13	20	3	1	0	0	0	6	0	239	16

=== International ===
As of match played 3 July 2026

Appearances and goals by national team and year
National team	Year	Apps	Goals
Cape Verde	2022	1	0
Cape Verde	2024	1	0
Cape Verde	2025	7	1
Cape Verde	2026	4	0
Total		13	1

Scores and results list Gabon's goal tally first, score column indicates score after each Semedo goal.

List of international goals scored by Yannick Semedo
No.	Date	Venue	Opponent	Score	Result	Competition
1	20 March 2025	Estádio Nacional de Cabo Verde, Praia, Cape Verde	Mauritius	1–0	1–0	2026 FIFA World Cup qualification

== Honours ==
Santa Clara

- Liga Portugal 2: 2023–24
