= 2026 FIFA World Cup qualification (CAF) =

Tournament details
- Dates: 15 November 2023 – 16 November 2025
- Teams: 53 (from 1 confederation)

Tournament statistics
- Matches played: 259
- Goals scored: 648 (2.5 per match)
- Attendance: 1,647,509 (6,361 per match)
- Top scorer: (Algeria) Mohamed Amoura (10 goals)

The 2026 FIFA World Cup qualification (CAF) was the African section of the qualification tournament for the 2026 FIFA World Cup, held in the United States, Canada and Mexico. A total of nine slots in the final tournament and one inter-confederation play-off slot were reserved for Confederation of African Football (CAF) teams.

== Format ==
Because nine CAF teams directly qualified instead of five, the CAF Executive Committee announced a new qualification format on 19 May 2023. Teams were drawn into nine groups of six teams. The winner of each group directly qualified to the World Cup, while the four best group runners-up participated in play-offs to determine which team would advance to the inter-confederation play-offs.

- First round (group stage): Nine groups of six teams played in a home-and-away round-robin tournament. Group winners qualified for the 2026 FIFA World Cup.
- Second round (play-off): The four best group runners-up were seeded into play-offs to determine the CAF representative at the inter-confederation play-offs.

== Schedule ==
2026 FIFA World Cup qualification
Round	Matchday	Dates
First round	Matchday 1	15–18 November 2023
First round	Matchday 2	19–21 November 2023
First round	Matchday 3	5–8 June 2024
First round	Matchday 4	9–11 June 2024
First round	Matchday 5	19–22 March 2025
First round	Matchday 6	23–25 March 2025
First round	Matchday 7	3–6 September 2025
First round	Matchday 8	7–9 September 2025
First round	Matchday 9	8–10 October 2025
First round	Matchday 10	12–14 October 2025
Second round	Semi-finals	13 November 2025
Second round	Final	16 November 2025

== First round ==
Teams were drawn into nine groups of six teams to play home-and-away round robin matches from November 2023 to October 2025. The winners of each group qualified directly to the 2026 FIFA World Cup, and the four best group runners-up advanced to a play-off to determine which team would advance to the inter-confederation play-offs.

=== Draw ===
The draw was held on 13 July 2023 at 15:00 GMT (UTC±0) in Abidjan, Ivory Coast. All 54 FIFA-affiliated football associations from CAF entered qualification. However, Eritrea withdrew after the draw.

The draw pots were announced on 30 June (numbers in parentheses indicate FIFA Men's World Ranking at the time of the draw):

CAF qualification first round draw pots (Note: Teams in bold qualified directly for the World Cup. Teams in italics advanced to the second round.)
Pot 1	Pot 2	Pot 3
**Morocco** (13); **Senegal** (18); **Tunisia** (31); **Algeria** (33); **Egypt** (34); Nigeria (39); Cameroon (43); Mali (50); **Ivory Coast** (51)	Burkina Faso (55); **Ghana** (59); **South Africa** (62); **Cape Verde** (66); DR Congo (69); Guinea (80); Zambia (84); Gabon (85); Equatorial Guinea (91)	Uganda (92); Benin (93); Mauritania (99); Kenya (105); Congo (106); Madagascar (107); Guinea-Bissau (111); Namibia (112); Angola (114)
Pot 4	Pot 5	Pot 6
Mozambique (117); Gambia (119); Sierra Leone (120); Togo (122); Tanzania (123); Zimbabwe (124); Central African Republic (125); Malawi (126); Libya (127)	Niger (128); Comoros (130); Sudan (131); Rwanda (139); Burundi (140); Ethiopia (143); Eswatini (146); Botswana (147); Liberia (148)	Lesotho (152); South Sudan (168); Mauritius (180); Chad (181); São Tomé and Príncipe (187); Djibouti (193); Seychelles (196); Eritrea (198) **(W)**; Somalia (199)

=== Groups ===
==== Group A ====
Pos	Team	Pld	W	D	L	GF	GA	GD	Pts	Qualification	(Egypt)	(Burkina Faso)	(Sierra Leone)	(Guinea-Bissau)	(Ethiopia)	(Djibouti)
1	Egypt	10	8	2	0	20	2	+18	26	2026 FIFA World Cup	—	2–1	1–0	1–0	2–0	6–0
2	Burkina Faso	10	6	3	1	23	8	+15	21		0–0	—	2–2	1–1	3–1	4–1
3	Sierra Leone	10	4	3	3	12	10	+2	15		0–2	0–1	—	3–1	2–0	2–1
4	Guinea-Bissau	10	2	4	4	8	10	−2	10		1–1	1–2	1–1	—	0–0	2–0
5	Ethiopia	10	2	3	5	9	14	−5	9		0–2	0–3	0–0	1–0	—	6–1
6	Djibouti	10	0	1	9	5	33	−28	1		0–3	0–6	1–2	0–1	1–1	—

Source: FIFA
Rules for classification: Tiebreakers

==== Group B ====
Pos	Team	Pld	W	D	L	GF	GA	GD	Pts	Qualification	(Senegal)	(Democratic Republic of the Congo)	(Sudan)	(Togo)	(Mauritania)	(South Sudan)
1	Senegal	10	7	3	0	22	3	+19	24	2026 FIFA World Cup	—	1–1	2–0	2–0	4–0	4–0
2	DR Congo	10	7	1	2	15	6	+9	22	Second round	2–3	—	1–0	1–0	2–0	1–0
3	Sudan	10	3	4	3	8	6	+2	13		0–0	1–0	—	1–1	0–0	1–1
4	Togo	10	1	5	4	5	10	−5	8		0–0	0–1	1–0	—	2–2	1–1
5	Mauritania	10	1	4	5	4	13	−9	7		0–1	0–2	0–2	2–0	—	0–0
6	South Sudan	10	0	5	5	3	19	−16	5		0–5	1–4	0–3	0–0	0–0	—

Source: FIFA
Rules for classification: Tiebreakers

==== Group C ====
Pos	Team	Pld	W	D	L	GF	GA	GD	Pts	Qualification	(South Africa)	(Nigeria)	(Benin)	(Lesotho)	(Rwanda)	(Zimbabwe)
1	South Africa	10	5	3	2	15	9	+6	18	2026 FIFA World Cup	—	1–1	2–1	0–3 (Note: The South Africa v Lesotho match, which originally finished as a 2–0 win for South Africa, was later awarded as a 3–0 win to Lesotho as South Africa fielded an ineligible player, Teboho Mokoena.)	3–0	3–1
2	Nigeria	10	4	5	1	15	8	+7	17	Second round	1–1	—	4–0	1–1	1–0	1–1
3	Benin	10	5	2	3	12	11	+1	17		0–2	2–1	—	4–0	1–0	1–0
4	Lesotho	10	3	3	4	9	12	−3	12		0–3	1–2	0–0	—	0–1	1–0
5	Rwanda	10	3	2	5	5	9	−4	11		2–0	0–2	0–1	1–1	—	0–0
6	Zimbabwe	10	0	5	5	5	12	−7	5		0–0	1–1	2–2	0–2	0–1	—

Source: FIFA
Rules for classification: Tiebreakers

==== Group D ====
Pos	Team	Pld	W	D	L	GF	GA	GD	Pts	Qualification	(Cape Verde)	(Cameroon)	(Libya)	(Angola)	(Mauritius)	(Eswatini)
1	Cape Verde	10	7	2	1	16	8	+8	23	2026 FIFA World Cup	—	1–0	1–0	0–0	1–0	3–0
2	Cameroon	10	5	4	1	17	5	+12	19	Second round	4–1	—	3–1	0–0	3–0	3–0
3	Libya	10	4	4	2	12	10	+2	16		3–3	1–1	—	1–1	2–1	2–0
4	Angola	10	2	6	2	9	8	+1	12		1–2	1–1	0–1	—	3–1	1–0
5	Mauritius	10	1	3	6	7	17	−10	6		0–2	0–2	0–0	0–0	—	2–1
6	Eswatini	10	0	3	7	6	19	−13	3		0–2	0–0	0–1	2–2	3–3	—

Source: FIFA
Rules for classification: Tiebreakers

==== Group E ====
Pos	Team	Pld	W	D	L	GF	GA	GD	Pts	Qualification	(Morocco)	(Niger)	(Tanzania)	(Zambia)	(Republic of the Congo)	(Eritrea)
1	Morocco	8	8	0	0	22	2	+20	24	2026 FIFA World Cup	—	5–0	2–0	2–1	1–0	~~Canc.~~
2	Niger	8	5	0	3	11	10	+1	15		1–2	—	0–1	2–1	3–1	~~Canc.~~
3	Tanzania	8	3	1	4	6	7	−1	10		0–2	0–1	—	0–1	3–0 (Note: Congo were suspended on 6 February 2025 due to government interference in Congolese Football Federation operations. No announcement regarding their status was immediately available, and CAF initially cancelled their remaining matches, but Tanzania and Zambia were later awarded 3–0 victories by forfeit. The suspension was lifted by FIFA on 14 May 2025.)	~~Canc.~~
4	Zambia	8	3	0	5	10	10	0	9		0–2	0–1	0–1	—	4–2	~~Canc.~~
5	Congo	8	0	1	7	4	24	−20	1		0–6	0–3 (Note: Niger were awarded a 3–0 victory by forfeit after Congo objected to their regular stadium being deemed to not meet hosting requirements and refused to travel to DR Congo for the match.)	1–1	0–3	—	~~Canc.~~
6	Eritrea (Note: Eritrea withdrew from qualification after the draw due to concerns that players would seek political asylum if allowed to travel abroad.)	0	0	0	0	0	0	0	0	Withdrew	~~Canc.~~	~~Canc.~~	~~Canc.~~	~~Canc.~~	~~Canc.~~	—

Source: FIFA
Rules for classification: Tiebreakers

==== Group F ====
Pos	Team	Pld	W	D	L	GF	GA	GD	Pts	Qualification	(Ivory Coast)	(Gabon)	(The Gambia)	(Kenya)	(Burundi)	(Seychelles)
1	Ivory Coast	10	8	2	0	25	0	+25	26	2026 FIFA World Cup	—	1–0	1–0	3–0	1–0	9–0
2	Gabon	10	8	1	1	22	9	+13	25	Second round	0–0	—	3–2	2–1	2–0	3–0
3	Gambia	10	4	1	5	27	18	+9	13		0–2	3–4	—	3–3	2–0	5–1
4	Kenya	10	3	3	4	18	14	+4	12		0–0	1–2	1–3	—	1–1	5–0
5	Burundi	10	3	1	6	13	13	0	10		0–1	1–2	3–2	0–1	—	5–0
6	Seychelles	10	0	0	10	2	53	−51	0		0–7	0–4	0–7	0–5	1–3	—

Source: FIFA
Rules for classification: Tiebreakers

==== Group G ====
Pos	Team	Pld	W	D	L	GF	GA	GD	Pts	Qualification	(Algeria)	(Uganda)	(Mozambique)	(Guinea)	(Botswana)	(Somalia)
1	Algeria	10	8	1	1	24	8	+16	25	2026 FIFA World Cup	—	2–1	5–1	1–2	3–1	3–1
2	Uganda	10	6	0	4	14	9	+5	18		1–2	—	4–0	1–0	1–0	2–0
3	Mozambique	10	6	0	4	14	17	−3	18		0–2	3–1	—	1–2	2–0	2–1
4	Guinea	10	4	3	3	11	8	+3	15		0–0	2–1	0–1	—	2–2	0–0
5	Botswana	10	3	1	6	12	16	−4	10		1–3	0–1	2–3	1–0	—	2–0
6	Somalia	10	0	1	9	3	20	−17	1		0–3	0–1	0–1	0–3	1–3	—

Source: FIFA
Rules for classification: Tiebreakers

==== Group H ====
Pos	Team	Pld	W	D	L	GF	GA	GD	Pts	Qualification	(Tunisia)	(Namibia)	(Liberia)	(Malawi)	(Equatorial Guinea)	(São Tomé and Príncipe)
1	Tunisia	10	9	1	0	22	0	+22	28	2026 FIFA World Cup	—	3−0	3–0	2–0	1–0	4–0
2	Namibia	10	4	3	3	13	10	+3	15		0–0	—	1–1	1–2	1–1	3–0
3	Liberia	10	4	3	3	13	11	+2	15		0–1	3–1	—	0–1	3–0 (Note: Equatorial Guinea forfeited two matches after they fielded an ineligible player, Emilio Nsue. The original results were Equatorial Guinea 1–0 Namibia and Liberia 0–1 Equatorial Guinea.)	2–1
4	Malawi	10	4	1	5	11	10	+1	13		0–1	0–1	2–2	—	3–0 (Note: The match between Malawi and Equatorial Guinea on 9 October was cancelled after Equatorial Guinea's players went on strike and refused to travel over continued complaints over conditions and money: Equatorial Guinea head coach Juan Micha and several players were fired following the cancellation. FIFA updated the group standings to indicate a 3–0 forfeit win to Malawi without making an official statement.)	3–1
5	Equatorial Guinea	10	3	2	5	8	15	−7	11		0–1	0–3	1–1	1–0	—	2–0
6	São Tomé and Príncipe	10	1	0	9	5	26	−21	3		0–6	0–2	0–1	1–0	2–3	—

Source: FIFA
Rules for classification: Tiebreakers

==== Group I ====
Pos	Team	Pld	W	D	L	GF	GA	GD	Pts	Qualification	(Ghana)	(Madagascar)	(Mali)	(Comoros)	(Central African Republic)	(Chad)
1	Ghana	10	8	1	1	23	6	+17	25	2026 FIFA World Cup	—	1–0	1–0	1–0	4–3	5–0
2	Madagascar	10	6	1	3	17	12	+5	19		0–3	—	0–0	2–1	2–0	3–1
3	Mali	10	5	3	2	17	6	+11	18		1–2	4–1	—	3–0	1–1	3–1
4	Comoros	10	5	0	5	12	13	−1	15		1–0	1–2	0–3	—	4–2	1–0
5	Central African Republic	10	2	2	6	11	24	−13	8		0–5	1–4	0–0	0–2	—	1–0
6	Chad	10	0	1	9	5	24	−19	1		1–1	0–3	0–2	0–2	2–3	—

Source: FIFA
Rules for classification: Tiebreakers

=== Ranking of runners-up ===
On 14 March 2025, CAF notified its member associations that matches against sixth-place teams would be excluded when ranking the runners-up because Group E had only five teams after Eritrea withdrew. This information was not announced publicly by either CAF or FIFA.

Pos	Grp	Team	Pld	W	D	L	GF	GA	GD	Pts	Qualification
1	F	Gabon	8	6	1	1	15	9	+6	19	Second round
2	B	DR Congo	8	5	1	2	10	5	+5	16	Second round
3	D	Cameroon	8	4	3	1	14	5	+9	15	Second round
4	C	Nigeria	8	4	3	1	13	6	+7	15	Second round
5	A	Burkina Faso	8	4	3	1	13	7	+6	15	
6	E	Niger	8	5	0	3	11	10	+1	15	
7	I	Madagascar	8	4	1	3	11	11	0	13	
8	G	Uganda	8	4	0	4	11	9	+2	12	
9	H	Namibia	8	2	3	3	8	10	−2	9	

Source: FIFA
Rules for classification: Tiebreakers

== Second round ==
The four best group runners-up (Cameroon, DR Congo, Gabon, and Nigeria) advanced to play-offs to determine the sole CAF representative at the inter-confederation play-offs. The matchups for the semi-final were based on the 17 October 2025 FIFA rankings, with the highest-ranked side taking on the lowest and the second-highest taking on the third-highest. A total of three matches were played, all hosted in Morocco.

Team 1	Score	Team 2
Semi-finals
Nigeria	4–1 (a.e.t.)	Gabon
Cameroon	0–1	DR Congo
Final
Nigeria	1–1 (a.e.t.) (3–4 p)	DR Congo

== Inter-confederation play-offs ==
The winner of the second round, DR Congo, joined Bolivia (from CONMEBOL), Iraq (from AFC), Jamaica and Suriname (both from CONCACAF), and New Caledonia (from OFC) in the inter-confederation play-offs.

The teams were ranked according to the November 2025 FIFA Men's World Ranking, with the four lowest-ranked teams playing in two single-elimination matches. The winners met the two highest-ranked teams in another set of single-elimination matches, with the winners of these matches qualifying for the 2026 FIFA World Cup.

Semi-final
26 March 2026 – Zapopan
New Caledonia	0
Jamaica	1

Final
31 March 2026 – Zapopan
DR Congo (a.e.t.)	1
Jamaica	0

== Qualified teams ==
Qualified for the World Cup Failed to qualify Withdrew Not a CAF member

The following teams from CAF qualified for the final tournament.

Team	Qualified as	Qualified on	Previous appearances in FIFA World Cup (Note: Italic indicates hosts for that year.)
Morocco	Group E winners	5 September 2025	6 (1970, 1986, 1994, 1998, 2018, 2022)
Tunisia	Group H winners	8 September 2025	6 (1978, 1998, 2002, 2006, 2018, 2022)
Egypt	Group A winners	8 October 2025	3 (1934, 1990, 2018)
Algeria	Group G winners	9 October 2025	4 (1982, 1986, 2010, 2014)
Ghana	Group I winners	12 October 2025	4 (2006, 2010, 2014, 2022)
Cape Verde	Group D winners	13 October 2025	Debut
South Africa	Group C winners	14 October 2025	3 (1998, 2002, 2010)
Senegal	Group B winners	14 October 2025	3 (2002, 2018, 2022)
Ivory Coast	Group F winners	14 October 2025	3 (2006, 2010, 2014)
DR Congo	Inter-confederation play-offs Pathway 1 winners	31 March 2026	1 (1974)

== Top goalscorers ==
There were 648 goals scored in 259 matches, for an average of 2.5 goals per match.

10 goals

- (Algeria national football team) Mohamed Amoura

9 goals

- (Egypt national football team) Mohamed Salah

8 goals

- (Gabon national football team) Denis Bouanga
- (Mali national football team) Kamory Doumbia
- (Nigeria national football team) Victor Osimhen

7 goals

- (Gabon national football team) Pierre-Emerick Aubameyang
- (Gambia national football team) Musa Barrow
- (Ghana national football team) Jordan Ayew

6 goals

- (Kenya national football team) Michael Olunga

5 goals

- (Benin national football team) Steve Mounié
- (Burkina Faso national football team) Lassina Traoré
- (Egypt national football team) Trézéguet
- (Gambia national football team) Yankuba Minteh
- (Gambia national football team) Adama Sidibeh
- (Madagascar national football team) Rayan Raveloson
- (Senegal national football team) Sadio Mané

Below are full goalscorer lists for each group and the second round:

- Group A
- Group B
- Group C
- Group D
- Group E
- Group F
- Group G
- Group H
- Group I
- Second round
