= 2026 FIFA World Cup bids =

Bids to host football World Cup

The 2026 FIFA World Cup bidding process resulted in the Fédération Internationale de Football Association (FIFA) selecting the joint the United States/Canada/Mexico bid to hosts the 2026 FIFA World Cup.

Two bids to host the event were submitted to FIFA, a joint bid by the United States, Canada, and Mexico, and one by Morocco. On 13 June 2018, at the 68th FIFA Congress in Moscow, the joint bid was selected by 134 votes to Morocco's 65. This was the first tournament hosted by more than two countries, and only the second hosted by more than one country—the other having been the 2002 tournament, hosted by South Korea and Japan.

Upon this selection, each country made hosting records of their own. Canada became the fifth country to host both men's and women's World Cup—the latter having been in 2015; Mexico became the first country to host the men's World Cup three times—having done so previously in 1970 and 1986; and the United States became the first country to host both men's and women's World Cup twice—having hosted the 1994 men's and the 1999 and 2003 women's World Cups.

== Background ==
The FIFA Council (and its proceeding Executive Committee) went back and forth between 2013 and 2017 on limitations within hosting rotation based on the continental confederations. Originally, it was set that bids to be host would not be allowed from countries belonging to confederations that hosted the two preceding tournaments. It was temporarily changed to only prohibit countries belonging to the confederation that hosted the previous World Cup from bidding to host the following tournament, before the rule was changed back to its prior state of two World Cups. However, the FIFA Council did make an exception to potentially grant eligibility to member associations of the confederation of the second-to-last host of the FIFA World Cup in the event that none of the received bids fulfill the strict technical and financial requirements. In March 2017, FIFA president Gianni Infantino confirmed that "Europe (UEFA) and Asia (AFC) are excluded from the bidding following the selection of Russia and Qatar in 2018 and 2022 respectively." Therefore, the 2026 World Cup could be hosted by one of the remaining four confederations: CONCACAF (last hosted in 1994), CAF (last hosted in 2010), CONMEBOL (last hosted in 2014), or OFC (never hosted before), or potentially by UEFA in case no bid from those four met the requirements.

Co-hosting the FIFA World Cup, which had been banned by FIFA after the 2002 World Cup, was approved for the 2026 FIFA World Cup, though not limited to a specific number but instead evaluated on a case-by-case basis. Also by 2026, the FIFA general secretariat, after consultation with the Competitions Committee, will have the power to exclude bidders who do not meet the minimum technical requirements to host the competition.

== Bid process ==
The bidding process was due to start in 2015, with the appointment of hosts scheduled for the FIFA Congress on 10 May 2017 in Kuala Lumpur, Malaysia, but was postponed due to the 2015 FIFA corruption case and the subsequent resignation of Sepp Blatter and resumed following the FIFA Council meeting on 10 May 2016, with a final decision in May 2020, amid corruption allegations around the previous tournaments, due to be held in 2018 (Russia), as well as in 2022 (Qatar).

The original bidding process originally consisted of four phases:

- May 2016 – May 2017: a new strategy and consultation phase
- June 2017 – December 2018: enhanced phases for bid preparation
- January 2019 – February 2020: bid evaluation
- May 2020: final decision

The consultation phase focused on four areas:

- The inclusion of human rights requirements, sustainable event management, environmental protection in the bidding
- Principle of exclusion of bidders that do not meet technical requirements
- Review of the current stance on joint bids
- Number of teams

On 7 November 2017, FIFA published a guide to bidding process. It outlines the key elements of the reformed bidding process, the assessment mechanisms in place, recommendations on the protection of the process' integrity, the timeline for the selection of the host(s), the specific requirements for hosting, a detailed explanation of the government guarantees, as well as the principles of sustainable event management and human rights protection.

=== Bid Evaluation Task Force ===
On 27 October 2017, the FIFA Council ratified the decision of the Bureau of the Council of 6 September 2017 to approve the enhanced Bidding Regulations for the 2026 FIFA World Cup. It also appointed the members of the Bid Evaluation Task Force. According to the Bidding Regulations, the Task Force was composed by:

- Tomaž Vesel: chairman of the Audit & Compliance Committee
- Mukul Mudgal: chairman of the Governance Committee
- Ilco Gjorgioski: member of the Organising Committee for FIFA Competitions
- Zvonimir Boban: FIFA Deputy General Secretary (Football)
- Marco Villiger: FIFA Deputy General Secretary (Administration)

=== Fast track bid process ===
With no rival bid having emerged since April 2017 the CONCACAF member federations of Canada, Mexico and the United States sent a joint request to FIFA to hasten the bid process. Canada, Mexico and the United States wanted FIFA to award the bid outside the traditional bidding process at the June 2018 FIFA Congress in Moscow if the CONCACAF-bid meets FIFA requirements.

However, the FIFA Council proposed on 8 May 2017 that FIFA should establish a bidding procedure inviting initially only the member associations of CAF, CONCACAF, CONMEBOL and the OFC – continental confederations whose members had not hosted the two previous World Cups – as candidates to submit to FIFA bids to host the 2026 competition by 11 August 2017. The 68th FIFA Congress would decide on the selection of the candidate host associations.

On 11 May 2017, the 67th FIFA Congress voted on the FIFA Council proposal to the fast-track the 2026 World Cup bid process and set the following deadlines:

Updated bidding process:

- May 2016 – May 2017: a new strategy and consultation phase
- June 2017 – December 2017: enhanced phases for bid preparation
- March 2018 – June 2018: bid evaluation
- June 2018: final decision

Deadlines:

- 11 August 2017: any other nations interested in bidding had to express interest
- 16 March 2018: bidders had to meet a list of FIFA's technical specifications, and bids had to be officially submitted by then
- 13 June 2018: the 68th FIFA Congress decided on whether to select one of the official bids. Should neither be selected, further member associations, including those from AFC and UEFA and excluding the initial bidders, would be invited to bid, and in this scenario, a final decision would be taken by the 70th FIFA Congress in May 2020.

=== Bid requirements ===
Endorsement of a set of principles submitted by the FIFA administration was required as part of the process to select the host of the 2026 FIFA World Cup, including an overview of the content to be requested from bidding member associations and high-level hosting requirements. These included: stadium and infrastructure requirements; principles of sustainable event management, human rights and environmental protection; and details on aspects such as governmental support documents, the organisational model to be adopted and provisions for the establishment of a legacy fund. A complete version of the bid requirements was eventually dispatched to member associations that registered to take part in the process.

==== Stadiums requirements ====
FIFA established minimum requirements for stadiums capacities.

Matches	Stadium capacities
Opening match	80,000
Remaining group stage matches	40,000
Round of 32	40,000
Round of 16	40,000
Quarter-finals	40,000
Semi-finals	60,000
Match for third place	40,000
Final	80,000

==== Team and referee facilities ====
FIFA established minimum requirements for team and referee facilities.

Facilities	Number
Team base camp training Sites	48 (with 72 proposals)
Team base camp hotels	48 (with 72 proposals)
Venue-specific training sites	2–4 per stadium (with 4 proposals per stadium)
Venue-specific team hotels	2–4 per stadium (with 4 proposals per stadium)
Referee base camp training sites	1 (with 2 proposed)
Referee base camp hotels	1 (with 2 proposed)

== Official bids ==
Under FIFA rules as of 2017, the 2026 tournament could not be in either Europe (UEFA) or Asia (AFC), leaving an African (CAF) bid, a North American (CONCACAF) bid, a South American (CONMEBOL) bid, or an Oceania (OFC) bid as the only possible options. In March 2017, FIFA confirmed that "Europe (UEFA) and Asia (AFC) were excluded from the bidding following the selection of Russia and Qatar in 2018 and 2022, respectively."

=== CAF ===
- Morocco

Moroccan Minister of Youth and Sports, Moncef Belkhayat, stated that: "The African Cup of Nations 2015 will be the first indicator of our ability to host a great event. Then we can confidently consider us as a candidate to host the World Cup 2026". However, in November 2014, Morocco asked to postpone the Africa Cup of Nations to summer due to the Ebola virus epidemic in West Africa, and lost its hosting rights in favour of Equatorial Guinea.

Morocco lost bids to host the World Cup in 1994, 1998, 2006, and 2010 to the United States, France, Germany, and South Africa, respectively. Morocco successfully hosted the 2013 and 2014 FIFA Club World Cups, as well as the 2018 African Nations Championship. On 11 August 2017, Morocco officially announced a bid to host the 2026 FIFA World Cup. If successful, it would have been the second World Cup in an African country, after the 2010 tournament in South Africa.

=== CONCACAF ===
Canada/Mexico/United States

Following rumours of each nation bidding individually, the three nations announced on 10 April 2017 a bid to host the World Cup jointly. Canada and Mexico would host 10 games each, while the United States would host the remaining 60 games, including all remaining matches from the quarterfinals onward.

The 2026 tournament was the first to be held in three countries. Mexico became the first nation to host three World Cups, having already hosted the 1970 and 1986 men's tournaments. It was the first men's tournament and second overall to be held in Canada after the 2015 women's tournament, and the second men's and fourth overall in the United States, after the 1994 men's and the 1999 and 2003 women's tournaments.

== Bid evaluation report ==
Some of the main requirements addressed by FIFA were security, finance and hospitality. In the bid evaluation report, Morocco's bid was deemed "high risk" and the United joint bid was rated as "low risk" to FIFA.

== 2026 World Cup host election results ==
203 of the 211 member associations of FIFA were able to vote.

The eight ineligible associations were as follows:

- The four bidding nations, Morocco, Canada, Mexico and the United States, and three organized unincorporated territories of the U.S. (Guam, Puerto Rico and the U.S. Virgin Islands) were ineligible to vote. American Samoa, an unorganized unincorporated territory of the U.S., was allowed to vote.
- Ghana was barred from voting after the country's FA was suspended amid a corruption scandal.

The United bid won receiving 134 votes, whilst the Morocco bid received 65 votes. No representative within their home confederation CONCACAF voted against the United bid, whilst eleven representatives within their home confederation CAF voted against the Morocco bid. The Brazil representative voted for the Morocco bid reportedly thinking the vote was private, despite its home confederation CONMEBOL having endorsed the United bid overall. Iran voted for the option "None of the bids", and Cuba, Slovenia and Spain abstained from voting.

=== Election results by association ===
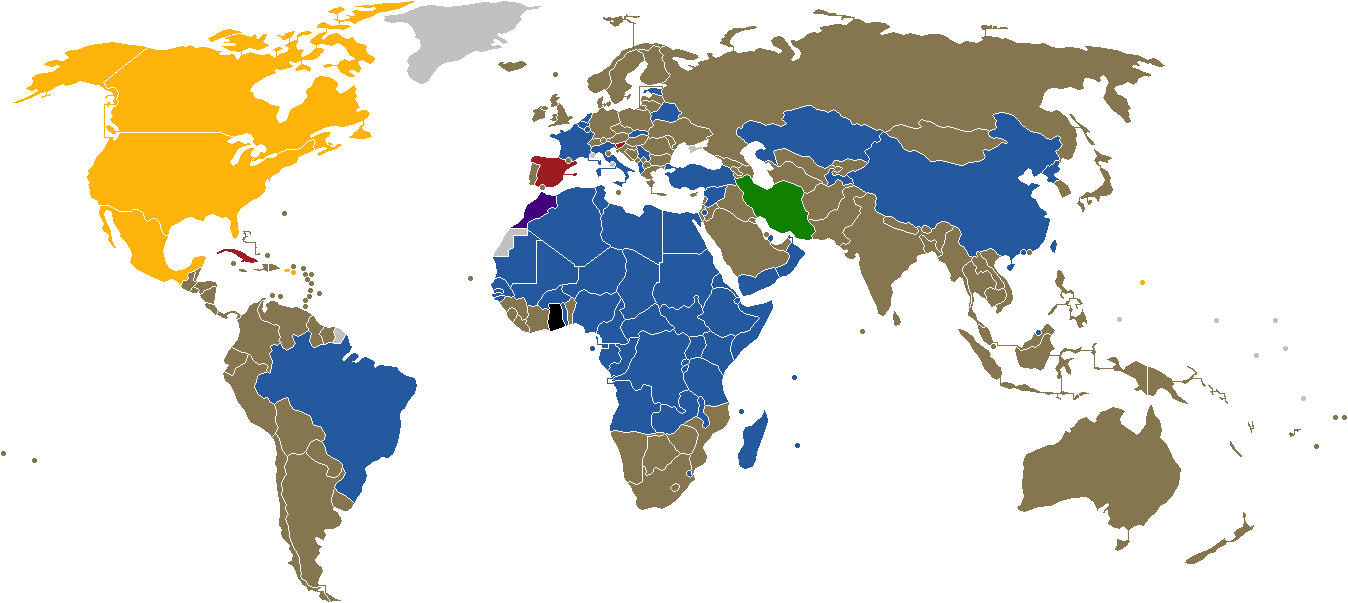
Map of the votes given by football associations to the 2026 FIFA World Cup bids.: Allowed to vote / Banned from voting; Voted for United bid / Canada/Mexico/United States/Puerto Rico/US Virgin Islands/Guam; Voted for Moroccan bid / Morocco; Voted for neither / Sanctioned by FIFA; Abstained from voting / Not a FIFA member

Confederation	Football association	Vote			Abstention
Confederation	Football association	United bid	Morocco	None	Abstention
AFC	Afghanistan	U			
AFC	Australia	U			
AFC	Bangladesh	U			
AFC	Bahrain	U			
AFC	Bhutan	U			
AFC	Brunei Darussalam		M		
AFC	Cambodia	U			
AFC	China		M		
AFC	Chinese Taipei		M		
AFC	(Timor-Leste) East Timor	U			
AFC	Hong Kong	U			
AFC	India	U			
AFC	Indonesia	U			
AFC	Iran			N	
AFC	Iraq	U			
AFC	Japan	U			
AFC	Jordan	U			
AFC	Kuwait	U			
AFC	Kyrgyzstan	U			
AFC	Laos	U			
AFC	Lebanon	U			
AFC	Macau		M		
AFC	Malaysia	U			
AFC	Maldives	U			
AFC	Mongolia	U			
AFC	Myanmar	U			
AFC	Nepal	U			
AFC	North Korea		M		
AFC	Oman		M		
AFC	Pakistan	U			
AFC	Palestine		M		
AFC	Philippines	U			
AFC	Qatar		M		
AFC	Saudi Arabia	U			
AFC	Singapore	U			
AFC	Sri Lanka	U			
AFC	South Korea	U			
AFC	Syria		M		
AFC	Tajikistan		M		
AFC	Thailand	U			
AFC	Turkmenistan	U			
AFC	United Arab Emirates	U			
AFC	Uzbekistan	U			
AFC	Vietnam	U			
AFC	Yemen		M		
AFC subtotal: 45 valid ballots		33	11	1	0
CAF	Algeria		M		
CAF	Angola		M		
CAF	Benin	U			
CAF	Botswana	U			
CAF	Burkina Faso		M		
CAF	Burundi		M		
CAF	Cameroon		M		
CAF	Cape Verde	U			
CAF	Central African Republic		M		
CAF	Chad		M		
CAF	Comoros		M		
CAF	(Republic of the Congo) Congo		M		
CAF	(Democratic Republic of the Congo) DR Congo		M		
CAF	Djibouti		M		
CAF	Egypt		M		
CAF	Equatorial Guinea		M		
CAF	Eritrea		M		
CAF	Eswatini		M		
CAF	Ethiopia		M		
CAF	Gabon		M		
CAF	(The Gambia) Gambia		M		
CAF	Guinea	U			
CAF	Guinea-Bissau		M		
CAF	Ivory Coast		M		
CAF	Kenya		M		
CAF	Lesotho	U			
CAF	Liberia	U			
CAF	Libya		M		
CAF	Madagascar		M		
CAF	Malawi		M		
CAF	Mali		M		
CAF	Mauritania		M		
CAF	Mauritius		M		
CAF	Mozambique	U			
CAF	Namibia	U			
CAF	Niger		M		
CAF	Nigeria		M		
CAF	Rwanda		M		
CAF	São Tomé and Príncipe		M		
CAF	Senegal		M		
CAF	Seychelles		M		
CAF	Sierra Leone	U			
CAF	Somalia		M		
CAF	South Africa	U			
CAF	South Sudan		M		
CAF	Sudan		M		
CAF	Tanzania		M		
CAF	Togo		M		
CAF	Tunisia		M		
CAF	Uganda		M		
CAF	Zambia		M		
CAF	Zimbabwe	U			
CAF subtotal: 52 valid ballots		11	41	0	0
CONCACAF	Anguilla	U			
CONCACAF	Antigua and Barbuda	U			
CONCACAF	Aruba	U			
CONCACAF	(The Bahamas) Bahamas	U			
CONCACAF	Barbados	U			
CONCACAF	Belize	U			
CONCACAF	Bermuda	U			
CONCACAF	British Virgin Islands	U			
CONCACAF	Cayman Islands	U			
CONCACAF	Costa Rica	U			
CONCACAF	Cuba				A
CONCACAF	Curaçao	U			
CONCACAF	Dominica	U			
CONCACAF	Dominican Republic	U			
CONCACAF	El Salvador	U			
CONCACAF	Grenada	U			
CONCACAF	Guatemala	U			
CONCACAF	Guyana	U			
CONCACAF	Haiti	U			
CONCACAF	Honduras	U			
CONCACAF	Jamaica	U			
CONCACAF	Montserrat	U			
CONCACAF	Nicaragua	U			
CONCACAF	Panama	U			
CONCACAF	Saint Kitts and Nevis	U			
CONCACAF	Saint Lucia	U			
CONCACAF	Saint Vincent and the Grenadines	U			
CONCACAF	Suriname	U			
CONCACAF	Trinidad and Tobago	U			
CONCACAF	Turks and Caicos Islands	U			
CONCACAF subtotal: 29 valid ballots		29	0	0	1
CONMEBOL	Argentina	U			
CONMEBOL	Bolivia	U			
CONMEBOL	Brazil		M		
CONMEBOL	Chile	U			
CONMEBOL	Colombia	U			
CONMEBOL	Ecuador	U			
CONMEBOL	Paraguay	U			
CONMEBOL	Peru	U			
CONMEBOL	Uruguay	U			
CONMEBOL	Venezuela	U			
CONMEBOL subtotal: 10 valid ballots		9	1	0	0
OFC	American Samoa	U			
OFC	Cook Islands	U			
OFC	Fiji	U			
OFC	New Caledonia	U			
OFC	New Zealand	U			
OFC	Papua New Guinea	U			
OFC	Samoa	U			
OFC	Solomon Islands	U			
OFC	(French Polynesia) Tahiti	U			
OFC	Tonga	U			
OFC	Vanuatu	U			
OFC subtotal: 11 valid ballots		11	0	0	0
UEFA	Albania		M		
UEFA	Andorra	U			
UEFA	Armenia	U			
UEFA	Austria	U			
UEFA	Azerbaijan	U			
UEFA	Belarus		M		
UEFA	Belgium		M		
UEFA	Bosnia and Herzegovina	U			
UEFA	Bulgaria	U			
UEFA	Croatia	U			
UEFA	Cyprus	U			
UEFA	Czech Republic	U			
UEFA	Denmark	U			
UEFA	England	U			
UEFA	Estonia		M		
UEFA	Faroe Islands	U			
UEFA	Finland	U			
UEFA	France		M		
UEFA	(Georgia (country)) Georgia	U			
UEFA	Germany	U			
UEFA	Gibraltar	U			
UEFA	Greece	U			
UEFA	Hungary	U			
UEFA	Iceland	U			
UEFA	Israel	U			
UEFA	Italy		M		
UEFA	Kazakhstan		M		
UEFA	Kosovo	U			
UEFA	Latvia	U			
UEFA	Liechtenstein	U			
UEFA	Lithuania	U			
UEFA	Luxembourg		M		
UEFA	(North Macedonia) Macedonia	U			
UEFA	Malta	U			
UEFA	Moldova	U			
UEFA	Montenegro	U			
UEFA	Netherlands		M		
UEFA	Northern Ireland	U			
UEFA	Norway	U			
UEFA	Poland	U			
UEFA	Portugal	U			
UEFA	Republic of Ireland	U			
UEFA	Romania	U			
UEFA	Russia	U			
UEFA	San Marino	U			
UEFA	Scotland	U			
UEFA	Serbia		M		
UEFA	Slovakia		M		
UEFA	Slovenia				A
UEFA	Spain				A (Note: The day before the voting, Spanish coach Julen Lopetegui signed a contract with Real Madrid: after learning of this signing en route to the voting venue, RFEF chairman Luis Rubiales instead flew to the Spanish team camp in Krasnodar, where he fired Lopetegui on the spot.)
UEFA	Sweden	U			
UEFA	Switzerland	U			
UEFA	Turkey		M		
UEFA	Ukraine	U			
UEFA	Wales	U			
UEFA subtotal: 53 valid ballots		41	12	0	2
Total: 200 valid ballots (100%)		134 (67.0%)	65 (32.5%)	1 (0.5%)	3
