= Dodo Dokou =

Benin footballer

Personal information
- Full name: Francisco Dodo Abdel Dodji Dokou
- Date of birth: 4 May 2004 (age 22)
- Place of birth: Cotonou, Benin
- Height: 1.77 m (5 ft 10 in)
- Position: Midfielder

Team information
- Current team: Al Mokawloon Al Arab
- Number: 6

Youth career
- –2022: Ofmas Sad FC

Senior career*
Years	Team	Apps	(Gls)
2022–2025	Smouha	75	(1)
2025–2026	Leixões	5	(0)
2026–	Al Mokawloon Al Arab	5	(0)

International career^{‡}
2023–	Benin	18	(2)
- * Club domestic league appearances and goals as of 15 September 2026 ‡ National team caps and goals as of 17:20, 2 April 2025 (UTC)

Dodo Dokou (born 4 May 2004) is a Beninese footballer who plays for Egyptian Premier League club Al Mokawloon Al Arab and the Benin national team.

== Club career ==
=== Smouha ===
On 7 October 2022, Dokou joined Egyptian Premier League club Smouha, signing a four-year contract. In June 2023, it was reported that Dokou was close to signing a five-year contract with Olympique de Marseille of France's Ligue 1 and would immediately be loaned to R.W.D. Molenbeek of the Belgian Pro League.

=== Leixões ===
On 26 August 2025, Dokou joined Liga Portugal 2 side Leixões for an undisclosed fee on a 4 year deal.

=== Al Mokawloon Al Arab ===
In August 2026, Dokou signed with Egyptian Premier League side Al Mokawloon Al Arab.

== International career ==
Dokou was called up to the Benin national under-20 football team by Mathias Déguénon for the 2023 U-20 Africa Cup of Nations. He was named the man of the match for his performance against Zambia in the opening match for the team. He made his senior international debut on 22 March 2023 in a 2023 Africa Cup of Nations qualification match against Rwanda. He scored his first senior international goal against the same opponent on 6 June 2024 in a surprise victory in 2025 Africa Cup of Nations qualification.

=== International goals ===
No.	Date	Venue	Opponent	Score	Result	Competition
1	6 June 2024	Felix Houphouet Boigny Stadium, Abidjan, Ivory Coast	Rwanda	1–0	1–0	2025 Africa Cup of Nations qualification
1	20 March 2025	Moses Mabhida Stadium, Durban, South Africa	Zimbabwe	2–1	2–2	2026 FIFA World Cup qualification
Last updated 2 April 2025

=== International career statistics ===
As of match played 25 March 2025

National team	Year	Apps	Goals
Benin
Benin	2023	6	0
Benin	2024	10	1
Benin	2025	2	1
Total		18	2
