= 2026 FIFA World Cup qualification (inter-confederation play-offs) =

Tournament details
- Host country: Mexico
- Dates: 26–31 March 2026
- Teams: 6 (from 5 confederations)
- Venues: 2 (in 2 host cities)

Tournament statistics
- Matches played: 4
- Goals scored: 8 (2 per match)
- Attendance: 163,799 (40,950 per match)
- Top scorer(s): (Bolivia) Moisés Paniagua (2 goals)

The inter-confederation play-offs of the 2026 FIFA World Cup qualification tournament (officially named the FIFA World Cup 2026 Play-Off Tournament) determined two qualification spots for the 2026 FIFA World Cup, played in Canada, Mexico, and the United States. The play-offs took place on 26 and 31 March 2026 at two venues in Mexico.

Iraq and DR Congo won their respective brackets, and thus qualified to compete in the final tournament.

== Format ==
The slot allocation for the inter-confederation play-offs was confirmed by the FIFA Council in 2017. Each confederation received one play-off slot, except UEFA, with an additional play-off slot also given to the confederation of the host association(s). As Canada, Mexico, and the United States were subsequently appointed as hosts for the 2026 World Cup, CONCACAF received two spots in the play-off tournament, while the AFC, CAF, CONMEBOL, and OFC each received one.

The play-off tournament was initially only known to be held in North America to act as a preparatory event for the World Cup, and would take place during the FIFA window of 23–31 March 2026, less than three months prior to the start of the final tournament. The play-offs featured six teams, split into two brackets of three teams, with both bracket winners qualifying for the World Cup. The teams were seeded into brackets based on the FIFA Men's World Ranking. Each bracket features two unseeded teams facing each other in a semi-final, with the winner advancing to the play-off final against a seeded team.

The play-offs were played in single-leg knockout matches. If scores were level at the end of normal time, 30 minutes of extra time would be played, where each team was allowed to make a sixth substitution. If the scores remained tied, a penalty shoot-out was used to determine the winner.

== Venues ==
Location of the host cities of the 2026 FIFA World Cup qualification (inter-confederation play-offs)

- 1 Guadalupe
- 2 Zapopan

On 19 November 2025, FIFA confirmed Mexico as the host for the inter-confederation play-offs. The four matches were played at the Estadio Akron in Guadalajara and Estadio BBVA in Monterrey, with each venue hosting two fixtures. Both are stadiums that would be used during the Finals tournament later that year, during which they were known by different names, as FIFA prohibits sponsorship of stadia unless the stadium sponsors are also official FIFA sponsors. For example, the Estadio BBVA in Guadalupe was known during the competition as Estadio Monterrey. However, as these were just the inter-confederational play-offs, the names were only different on-air and in print, with both stadiums keeping existing exterior sponsored signage uncovered.

Guadalupe (Monterrey area)	Zapopan (Guadalajara area)
Estadio BBVA (Estadio Monterrey)	Estadio Akron (Estadio Guadalajara)
Capacity: 53,529	Capacity: 46,232

== Qualified teams ==
Confederation	Method of qualification	Team	Date advanced to play-offs
AFC	Fifth round winners	Iraq	18 November 2025
CAF	Second round winners	DR Congo	16 November 2025
CONCACAF	Third round best two group runners-up	Jamaica	18 November 2025
CONCACAF	Third round best two group runners-up	Suriname	18 November 2025
CONMEBOL	Seventh place	Bolivia	9 September 2025
OFC	Third round runners-up	New Caledonia	24 March 2025

== Draw ==
The draw took place on 20 November 2025, 13:00 CET (UTC+1), at the FIFA headquarters in Zurich, Switzerland. Teams were seeded based on the FIFA Men's World Ranking of 19 November 2025 (shown in parentheses). The teams ranked first and second were automatically allocated to play-off final 1 and 2, respectively. The remaining four teams were unseeded and placed into a single pot. In the draw, the unseeded teams were allocated to the first available match (match 1, then 2). The two CONCACAF teams had to be placed into separate paths per FIFA's general draw constraint.

The draw was presented by Melanie Winiger and conducted by Manolo Zubiria, the 2026 tournament's U.S. chief officer. Former player Christian Karembeu acted as an assistant in the draw.

Seeded	Unseeded
1. DR Congo (56) (final 1); 2. Iraq (58) (final 2)	3. Jamaica (70); 4. Bolivia (76); 5. Suriname (123); 6. New Caledonia (149)

== Schedule ==
The match schedule for the inter-confederation play-offs was announced on 21 November 2025, the day after the draw. Two matches took place on each of 26 and 31 March 2026.

All times are local, CST (UTC−6).

== Pathway 1 ==
=== Bracket ===
Semi-final
26 March 2026 – Zapopan
New Caledonia	0
Jamaica	1

Final
31 March 2026 – Zapopan
DR Congo (a.e.t.)	1
Jamaica	0

=== Semi-final ===
26 March 2026
21:00

New Caledonia	0–1	Jamaica
	Report	Cadamarteri 18'

Estadio Akron, Zapopan
Attendance: 40,983
Referee: Gustavo Tejera (Uruguay)

=== Final ===
31 March 2026
15:00

DR Congo	1–0 (a.e.t.)	Jamaica
Tuanzebe 100'	Report

Estadio Akron, Zapopan
Attendance: 39,983
Referee: Facundo Tello (Argentina) (Note: Tello suffered an injury in the 114th minute and was replaced by fourth official Darío Herrera (Argentina).)

The winner of Pathway 1, DR Congo, entered Group K in the final tournament.

== Pathway 2 ==
=== Bracket ===
Semi-final
26 March 2026 – Guadalupe
Bolivia	2
Suriname	1

Final
31 March 2026 – Guadalupe
Iraq	2
Bolivia	1

=== Semi-final ===
26 March 2026
16:00

Bolivia	2–1	Suriname
Paniagua 72'; Terceros 79' (pen.)	Report	Van Gelderen 48'

Estadio BBVA, Guadalupe
Attendance: 33,547
Referee: Alireza Faghani (Australia)

=== Final ===
31 March 2026
21:00

Iraq	2–1	Bolivia
Al-Hamadi 10'; Hussein 53'	Report	Paniagua 38'

Estadio BBVA, Guadalupe
Attendance: 49,286
Referee: Iván Barton (El Salvador)

The winner of Pathway 2, Iraq, entered Group I in the final tournament.

== Goalscorers ==
There were 8 goals scored in 4 matches, for an average of 2 goals per match.

2 goals

- (Bolivia) Moisés Paniagua

1 goal

- (Bolivia) Miguel Terceros
- (Democratic Republic of the Congo) Axel Tuanzebe
- (Iraq) Ali Al-Hamadi
- (Iraq) Aymen Hussein
- (Jamaica) Bailey Cadamarteri
- (Suriname) Liam van Gelderen

== Discipline ==
A player was automatically suspended for the next match for the following offences:

- Receiving a red card (red card suspensions could be extended for serious offences)
- Receiving two yellow cards in two qualifying matches (yellow card suspensions were not carried forward to the World Cup final tournament or any other future international matches)

The following suspensions were served during the inter-confederation play-offs:

Team	Player	Offence(s)	Suspended for match(es)
Jamaica	Ian Fray	(yellow card) vs Curaçao (10 October 2025); (yellow card) vs Curaçao (18 November 2025)	vs New Caledonia (26 March 2026)
Jamaica	Jon Russell	(yellow card) (yellow-red card) vs Curaçao (18 November 2025)	vs New Caledonia (26 March 2026)
New Caledonia	Pierre Bako	(yellow card) vs Tahiti (21 March 2025); (yellow card) vs New Zealand (24 March 2025)	vs Jamaica (26 March 2026)
Suriname	Kenneth Paal	(yellow card) vs El Salvador (13 November 2025); (yellow card) vs Guatemala (18 November 2025)	vs Bolivia (26 March 2026)

== Effects of the 2026 Iran war ==
Pathway 2 was affected by the 2026 Iran war, which began on 28 February 2026, a month before the final match between Iraq and Bolivia in Monterrey.

The outbreak of regional hostilities significantly impacted Iraq's logistical preparations for the inter-confederation play-offs. Following the closure of Iraqi airspace and the suspension of international flights, the Mexican Secretariat of Foreign Affairs intervened to grant entry visas for the national team through diplomatic channels in Saudi Arabia and Qatar, since Mexico does not have an embassy in Iraq. However, despite the issuance of visas, over 60% of the domestic-based squad remained stranded in Baghdad, and a scheduled training camp in Houston was canceled. Head coach Graham Arnold was forced to manage team operations remotely from the United Arab Emirates, as the delegation was unable to secure safe passage out of the conflict zone during the initial weeks of the war.

The Iraq Football Association (IFA) formally petitioned FIFA to postpone the play-off match, citing the impossibility of safe transit for the players and staff. FIFA denied the request, citing the rigidity of the FIFA International Match Calendar, and instead proposed an alternative overland route through Turkey to Istanbul. This proposal was rejected by IFA and Arnold due to security concerns regarding repeated Iranian strikes in the Kurdistan region. Amidst these travel complications, the Mexican government maintained its commitment to the team's participation, working directly with the Iraqi Embassy in Mexico to finalize all documentation. On 16 March, it was confirmed that FIFA would provide a chartered private jet to transport the Iraqi team to Mexico. The original plan was for the team to fly on 20 March from the Arar Domestic Airport in Saudi Arabia, near the Iraqi border, and arrive in Monterrey the next day, 10 days before the match. However, further airspace closures in the area forced the group of players and staff based in Iraq to travel by land to Jordan where they departed on a charter flight from Queen Alia International Airport in Amman on 21 March. After a technical layover in Lisbon, Portugal, they arrived in Monterrey minutes after midnight.

== See also ==
- 2026 FIFA World Cup qualification – UEFA second round
