= Emmanuel Jalai =

Zimbabwean footballer

Personal information
- Full name: Emmanuel Jalai
- Date of birth: 6 January 1999 (age 27)
- Place of birth: Harare, Zimbabwe
- Height: 1.69 m (5 ft 7 in)
- Position: Right-back

Team information
- Current team: Durban City
- Number: 2

Youth career
- Aces Youth

Senior career*
Years	Team	Apps	(Gls)
2018–2019	CAPS United		
2019–2025	Dynamos Harare		
2026–	Durban City	15	(0)

International career^{‡}
2024–	Zimbabwe	19	(0)
- * Club domestic league appearances and goals as of 00:30, 1 June 2026 (UTC) ‡ National team caps and goals as of 00:30, 1 June 2026 (UTC)

Emmanuel Jalai (born 6 January 1999) is a Zimbabwean professional footballer who plays as a right back for the South African Premiership club Durban City and the Zimbabwe national team.

== Club career ==
Jalai joined Dynamos FC in 2019, going on to become one of the club's most reliable defenders and longest serving players. He made over 150 appearances for the Harare-based club in the Zimbabwe Premier Soccer League, helping the team win the Chibuku Super Cup on three consecutive occasions.

In the 2025 season Jalai was appointed club captain of Dynamos, having previously worn the armband on numerous occasions. He was one of 11 finalists for the Soccer Star of the Year award and won the PSL Fan Choice award after helping Dynamos survive relegation on the final day of the season.

In January 2026, Jalai joined South African Betway Premiership side Durban City, signing with the club on 22 January 2026 after his contract with Dynamos expired. He helped Durban win the 2025–26 Nedbank Cup.

== International career ==
Jalai received his first call-up to the Zimbabwe senior national team in March 2024 under interim coach Norman Mapeza, representing his country in a four-nation tournament in Malawi. He subsequently represented Zimbabwe in the 2025 Africa Cup of Nations.

== Honours ==
Dynamo Harare

- Cup of Zimbabwe: 2023, 2024, 2025

Durban City

- Nedbank Cup: 2025–26
