= Prince Dube =

Tanzanian footballer (born 1997)

Personal information
- Full name: Prince Mpumelelo Dube
- Date of birth: 17 February 1997 (age 29)
- Place of birth: Bulawayo, Zimbabwe
- Position: Center-forward

Team information
- Current team: Young Africans Sports Club

Senior career*
Years	Team	Apps	(Gls)
2016–2017	Highlanders		
2017–2018	SuperSport United	0	(0)
2018	→ Black Leopards (loan)		
2018–2020	Highlanders		
2020–2024	Azam	54	(34)
2024–	Young Africans	9	(3)

International career^{‡}
2017–	Zimbabwe	30	(10)
- * Club domestic league appearances and goals ‡ National team caps and goals as of 16 June 2026

Prince Mpumelelo Dube (born 17 February 1997) is a Zimbabwean professional footballer, who most recently played forward for Tanzanian Premier League club Young Africans Sports Club and the Zimbabwe national team.

== Career ==
In August 2020, after several years spent playing in his native Zimbabwe, Dube joined Tanzanian club Azam, signing a three-year contract.

=== International career ===
Dube made his senior international debut for Zimbabwe on 26 March 2017 in a 0-0 friendly draw with Zambia.

On 11 December 2025, Dube was called up to the Zimbabwe squad for the 2025 Africa Cup of Nations.

==== International goals ====
Scores and results list Zimbabwe's goal tally first.

Goal	Date	Venue	Opponent	Score	Result	Competition
1.	30 June 2017	Royal Bafokeng Stadium, Phokeng, South Africa	Seychelles	3–0	6–0	2017 COSAFA Cup
2.	23 July 2017	National Sports Stadium, Harare, Zimbabwe	Namibia	1–0	1–0 (4–5 p)	2018 African Nations Championship qualification
3.	4 August 2019	Barbourfields Stadium, Bulawayo, Zimbabwe	Mauritius	1–1	3–1	2020 African Nations Championship qualification
4.	4 August 2019	Barbourfields Stadium, Bulawayo, Zimbabwe	Mauritius	2–1	3–1	2020 African Nations Championship qualification
5.	4 August 2019	Barbourfields Stadium, Bulawayo, Zimbabwe	Mauritius	3–1	3–1	2020 African Nations Championship qualification
6.	22 September 2019	National Sports Stadium, Harare, Zimbabwe	Lesotho	1–0	3–1	2020 African Nations Championship qualification
7.	16 November 2020	National Sports Stadium, Harare, Zimbabwe	Algeria	2–2	2–2	2021 Africa Cup of Nations qualification
8.	14 October 2024	Orlando Stadium, Johannesburg, South Africa	Namibia	3–0	3–1	2025 Africa Cup of Nations qualification
9.	22 December 2025	Adrar Stadium, Agadir, Morocco	Egypt	1–0	1–2	2025 Africa Cup of Nations
10.	30 May 2026	The Valley, London, England	India	1–0	1–0	2026 Unity Cup

== Career statistics ==
=== International ===
As of matches played 26 December 2025

National team	Year	Apps	Goals
Zimbabwe	2017	5	2
Zimbabwe	2019	5	4
Zimbabwe	2020	1	1
Zimbabwe	2022	3	0
Zimbabwe	2023	2	0
Zimbabwe	2024	5	1
Zimbabwe	2025	7	1
Total		28	9

== Honours ==
Young Africans

- Tanzanian Premier League:2024–25
- CRDB Bank Federation Cup:2024–25
