= 2025 Africa Cup of Nations Group B =

Football tournament group stage

Group B of the 2025 Africa Cup of Nations took place from 22 to 29 December 2025. The group consisted of Egypt, South Africa, Angola, and Zimbabwe.

Egypt and South Africa as the top two teams advanced to the round of 16.

== Teams ==
Draw position	Team	Zone	Method of qualification	Date of qualification	Finals appearance	Last appearance	Previous best performance	FIFA Rankings	
Draw position	Team	Zone	Method of qualification	Date of qualification	Finals appearance	Last appearance	Previous best performance	December 2024 (Note: The rankings of December 2024 were used for seeding for the final draw.)	December 2025
B1	Egypt	UNAF	Group C winners	15 October 2024	27th	2023	Winners (1957, 1959, 1986, 1998, 2006, 2008, 2010)	33	TBA
B2	South Africa	COSAFA	Group K winners	14 November 2024	12th	2023	Winners (1996)	57	TBA
B3	Angola	COSAFA	Group F winners	15 October 2024	10th	2023	Quarter-finals (2008, 2010, 2023)	85	TBA
B4	Zimbabwe	COSAFA	Group J runners-up	15 November 2024	6th	2021	Group stage (2004, 2006, 2008, 2017, 2019, 2021)	121	TBA

== Standings ==
Pos	Team	Pld	W	D	L	GF	GA	GD	Pts	Qualification
1	Egypt	3	2	1	0	3	1	+2	7	Advance to knockout stage
2	South Africa	3	2	0	1	5	4	+1	6	Advance to knockout stage
3	Angola	3	0	2	1	2	3	−1	2	
4	Zimbabwe	3	0	1	2	4	6	−2	1	

Source: CAF
Rules for classification: Group stage tiebreakers

== Matches ==
All times are local, CET (UTC+1).

=== Egypt vs Zimbabwe ===
22 December 2025
21:00

Egypt	2–1	Zimbabwe
Marmoush 64'; Salah 90+1'	Report	Dube 20'

Adrar Stadium, Agadir
Attendance: 28,199
Referee: Issa Sy (Senegal)

Egypt	Zimbabwe

GK	23	Mohamed El Shenawy
RB	3	Mohamed Hany
CB	6	Yasser Ibrahim
CB	4	Hossam Abdelmaguid
LB	12	Mohamed Hamdy		(substituted off) 82'
CM	19	Marwan Attia	(yellow card) 33'	(substituted off) 66'
CM	14	Hamdy Fathy
RW	10	Mohamed Salah (c)
AM	8	Emam Ashour		(substituted off) 34'
LW	7	Trézéguet	(yellow card) 44'	(substituted off) 67'
CF	22	Omar Marmoush
Substitutes:
FW	11	Mostafa Mohamed		(substituted on) 34'
DF	13	Ahmed Fatouh		(substituted on) 82'
FW	20	Ibrahim Adel		(substituted on) 66'
FW	25	Zizo		(substituted on) 67'
Manager:
Hossam Hassan

GK	22	Washington Arubi
RB	21	Godknows Murwira	(yellow card) 57'
CB	4	Munashe Garananga
CB	2	Gerald Takwara
LB	15	Teenage Hadebe
DM	18	Marvelous Nakamba (c)
RM	23	Emmanuel Jalai		(substituted off) 88'
CM	7	Prince Dube		(substituted off) 72'
CM	8	Jonah Fabisch
LM	14	Daniel Msendami		(substituted off) 72'
CF	11	Washington Navaya	(yellow card) 7'	(substituted off) 46'
Substitutes:
MF	6	Prosper Padera		(substituted on) 72'
FW	9	Macauley Bonne		(substituted on) 46'
MF	19	Tawanda Maswanhise		(substituted on) 88'
FW	20	Tawanda Chirewa		(substituted on) 72'
Manager:
(Romania) Mario Marinică

=== South Africa vs Angola ===
22 December 2025
18:00

South Africa	2–1	Angola
Appollis 21'; Foster 79'	Report	Show 35'

Marrakesh Stadium, Marrakesh
Attendance: 4,013
Referee: Mahmood Ismail (Sudan)

South Africa	Angola

GK	1	Ronwen Williams (c)
RB	20	Khuliso Mudau
CB	21	Siyabonga Ngezana
CB	14	Mbekezeli Mbokazi
LB	6	Aubrey Modiba	(yellow card) 41'
CM	13	Sphephelo Sithole	(yellow card) 45+3'
CM	4	Teboho Mokoena
RW	11	Mohau Nkota		(substituted off) 46'
AM	17	Sipho Mbule		(substituted off) 80'
LW	7	Oswin Appollis		(substituted off) 80'
CF	9	Lyle Foster
Substitutes:
FW	8	Tshepang Moremi		(substituted on) 46'
FW	12	Elias Mokwana		(substituted on) 80'
MF	15	Bathusi Aubaas		(substituted on) 80'
Manager:
(Belgium) Hugo Broos

GK	1	Hugo Marques
RB	4	Clinton Mata
CB	6	Kialonda Gaspar
CB	3	Jonathan Buatu
LB	13	Tó Carneiro	(yellow card) 32'
DM	23	Show
RM	18	Zito Luvumbo		(substituted off) 90+2'
CM	8	Maestro		(substituted off) 86'
CM	16	Fredy (c)		(substituted off) 86'
LM	10	Gelson Dala		(substituted off) 76'
CF	9	M'Bala Nzola		(substituted off) 76'
Substitutes:
FW	7	Felício Milson		(substituted on) 76'
FW	19	Mabululu		(substituted on) 76'
MF	15	Beni Mukendi		(substituted on) 86'
FW	17	Randy Nteka	(yellow card) 88'	(substituted on) 86'
FW	27	Chico Banza		(substituted on) 90+2'
Manager:
(France) Patrice Beaumelle

=== Egypt vs South Africa ===
26 December 2025
16:00

Egypt	1–0	South Africa
Salah 45' (pen.)	Report

Adrar Stadium, Agadir
Attendance: 40,219
Referee: Pacifique Ndabihawenimana (Burundi)

Egypt	South Africa

GK	23	Mohamed El Shenawy
CB	6	Yasser Ibrahim
CB	14	Hamdy Fathy
CB	5	Ramy Rabia
RWB	3	Mohamed Hany	(yellow card) 30' (yellow-red card) 45+2'
LWB	12	Mohamed Hamdy
CM	25	Zizo		(substituted off) 80'
CM	19	Marwan Attia
CM	7	Trézéguet		(substituted off) 80'
CF	10	Mohamed Salah (c)		(substituted off) 90'
CF	22	Omar Marmoush		(substituted off) 46'
Substitutes:
MF	8	Emam Ashour		(substituted on) 46'
MF	15	Mohamed Shehata		(substituted on) 80'
MF	17	Mohanad Lasheen		(substituted on) 80'
FW	21	Osama Faisal		(substituted on) 90'
Manager:
Hossam Hassan

GK	1	Ronwen Williams (c)
RB	20	Khuliso Mudau	(yellow card) 43'
CB	21	Siyabonga Ngezana
CB	14	Mbekezeli Mbokazi
LB	6	Aubrey Modiba
CM	13	Sphephelo Sithole		(substituted off) 75'
CM	4	Teboho Mokoena	(yellow card) 20'
RW	7	Oswin Appollis		(substituted off) 69'
AM	5	Thalente Mbatha		(substituted off) 46'
LW	8	Tshepang Moremi		(substituted off) 80'
CF	9	Lyle Foster	(yellow card) 43'
Substitutes:
MF	17	Sipho Mbule		(substituted on) 46'
FW	10	Relebohile Mofokeng		(substituted on) 69'
FW	23	Evidence Makgopa		(substituted on) 75'
FW	12	Elias Mokwana		(substituted on) 80'
Manager:
(Belgium) Hugo Broos

=== Angola vs Zimbabwe ===
26 December 2025
13:30

Angola	1–1	Zimbabwe
Dala 24'	Report	Musona 45+6'

Marrakesh Stadium, Marrakesh
Attendance: 5,110
Referee: Peter Waweru (Kenya)

Angola	Zimbabwe

GK	1	Hugo Marques
RB	4	Clinton Mata
CB	3	Jonathan Buatu
CB	5	David Carmo
LB	13	Tó Carneiro
CM	15	Beni Mukendi		(substituted off) 59'
CM	23	Show	(yellow card) 4'	(substituted off) 80'
RW	14	Manuel Benson		(substituted off) 59'
AM	16	Fredy (c)
LW	10	Gelson Dala		(substituted off) 80'
CF	9	M'Bala Nzola		(substituted off) 67'
Substitutes:
MF	17	Randy Nteka		(substituted on) 59'
FW	18	Zito Luvumbo	(yellow card) 76'	(substituted on) 59'
FW	19	Mabululu		(substituted on) 67'
FW	7	Felício Milson		(substituted on) 80'
MF	8	Maestro	(yellow card) 83'	(substituted on) 80'
Manager:
(France) Patrice Beaumelle

GK	22	Washington Arubi
RB	23	Emmanuel Jalai
CB	2	Gerald Takwara
CB	15	Teenage Hadebe		(substituted off) 37'
LB	5	Divine Lunga	(yellow card) 38'
CM	8	Jonah Fabisch	(yellow card) 61'
CM	18	Marvelous Nakamba (c)
RW	7	Prince Dube	(yellow card) 49'
AM	17	Knowledge Musona		(substituted off) 58'
LW	12	Bill Antonio		(substituted off) 58'
CF	9	Macauley Bonne		(substituted off) 89'
Substitutes:
DF	13	Brendan Galloway		(substituted on) 37'
MF	20	Tawanda Chirewa		(substituted on) 58'
FW	26	Ishmael Wadi	(yellow card) 82'	(substituted on) 58'
FW	11	Washington Navaya		(substituted on) 89'
Manager:
(Romania) Mario Marinică

=== Angola vs Egypt ===
29 December 2025
17:00

Angola	0–0	Egypt
	Report

Adrar Stadium, Agadir
Attendance: 16,090
Referee: Clement Franklin Kpan (Ivory Coast)

Angola	Egypt

GK	1	Hugo Marques
RB	25	Rui Modesto
CB	6	Kialonda Gaspar
CB	5	David Carmo
LB	2	Núrio Fortuna
DM	15	Beni Mukendi		(substituted off) 64'
CM	8	Maestro		(substituted off) 79'
CM	16	Fredy (c)
RF	18	Zito Luvumbo		(substituted off) 64'
CF	19	Mabululu		(substituted off) 86'
LF	27	Chico Banza	(yellow card) 27'	(substituted off) 64'
Substitutes:
MF	14	Manuel Benson		(substituted on) 64'
FW	10	Gelson Dala		(substituted on) 64'
MF	23	Show		(substituted on) 64'
FW	9	M'Bala Nzola		(substituted on) 79'
FW	11	Ary Papel		(substituted on) 86'
Manager:
(France) Patrice Beaumelle

GK	26	Mostafa Shobeir
CB	28	Mohamed Ismail		(substituted off) 46'
CB	4	Hossam Abdelmaguid
CB	2	Khaled Sobhi
DM	17	Mohanad Lasheen		(substituted off) 64'
RM	24	Ahmed Eid
CM	27	Mahmoud Saber		(substituted off) 46'
CM	20	Ibrahim Adel	(yellow card) 25'
LM	13	Ahmed Fatouh
CF	9	Salah Mohsen (c)		(substituted off) 86'
CF	11	Mostafa Mohamed		(substituted off) 46'
Substitutes:
FW	18	Mostafa Fathi		(substituted on) 46'
MF	25	Zizo		(substituted on) 46'
DF	6	Yasser Ibrahim	(yellow card) 70'	(substituted on) 46'
MF	15	Mohamed Shehata		(substituted on) 64'
MF	14	Hamdy Fathy		(substituted on) 86'
Manager:
Hossam Hassan

=== Zimbabwe vs South Africa ===
29 December 2025
17:00

Zimbabwe	2–3	South Africa
Maswanhise 19'; Modiba 73' (o.g.)	Report	Moremi 7'; Foster 50'; Appollis 82' (pen.)

Marrakesh Stadium, Marrakesh
Attendance: 9,235
Referee: Mustapha Kechchaf (Morocco)

Zimbabwe	South Africa

GK	22	Washington Arubi
RB	4	Munashe Garananga		(substituted off) 75'
CB	2	Gerald Takwara
CB	13	Brendan Galloway
LB	5	Divine Lunga
CM	18	Marvelous Nakamba (c)	(yellow card) 81'
CM	8	Jonah Fabisch		(substituted off) 88'
RW	19	Tawanda Maswanhise
AM	12	Bill Antonio		(substituted off) 59'
LW	14	Daniel Msendami		(substituted off) 59'
CF	7	Prince Dube		(substituted off) 60'
Substitutes:
FW	27	Junior Zindoga		(substituted on) 59'
FW	20	Tawanda Chirewa		(substituted on) 59'
FW	9	Macauley Bonne		(substituted on) 60'
DF	23	Emmanuel Jalai		(substituted on) 75'
MF	28	Tapuwanashe Chakuchichi		(substituted on) 88'
Manager:
(Romania) Mario Marinică

GK	1	Ronwen Williams (c)
RB	20	Khuliso Mudau
CB	21	Siyabonga Ngezana
CB	14	Mbekezeli Mbokazi
LB	6	Aubrey Modiba
CM	13	Sphephelo Sithole		(substituted off) 46'
CM	4	Teboho Mokoena
RW	8	Tshepang Moremi		(substituted off) 76'
AM	17	Sipho Mbule	(yellow card) 34'	(substituted off) 86'
LW	7	Oswin Appollis
CF	9	Lyle Foster		(substituted off) 73'
Substitutes:
MF	15	Bathusi Aubaas		(substituted on) 46'
FW	23	Evidence Makgopa		(substituted on) 73'
FW	11	Mohau Nkota		(substituted on) 76'
MF	5	Thalente Mbatha		(substituted on) 86'
Manager:
(Belgium) Hugo Broos
