= Oswin Appollis =

South African soccer player (born 2001)

Personal information
- Full name: Oswin Reagan Appollis
- Date of birth: 25 August 2001 (age 25)
- Place of birth: Cape Town, South Africa
- Height: 1.71 m (5 ft 7 in)
- Positions: Left winger; attacking midfielder

Team information
- Current team: Orlando Pirates
- Number: 12

Youth career
- Island Rovers AFC
- –2018: Ajax Cape Town
- 2018–2019: SuperSport United

Senior career*
| Years | Team | Apps | (Gls) |
| 2019–2022 | SuperSport United | 5 | (0) |
| 2021 | → University of Pretoria (loan) | 12 | (2) |
| 2022–2023 | Pretoria Callies | 28 | (6) |
| 2023–2025 | Polokwane City | 54 | (8) |
| 2025– | Orlando Pirates | 39 | (11) |

International career^{‡}
| 2019 | South Africa U20 | 3 | (0) |
| 2023– | South Africa | 34 | (8) |
- * Club domestic league appearances and goals as of 3 November 2026 ‡ National team caps and goals as of 3 October 2026

Oswin Reagan Appollis (born 25 August 2001) is a South African professional soccer player who plays as a winger or attacking midfielder for South African Premiership club Orlando Pirates and the South Africa national team.

== Youth career ==
Appollis started playing youth football with Island Rovers AFC in Bishop Lavis, Cape Town, at the age of nine. After he was initially placed in the B-team, he soon rose to the A-team.

Appollis played on the school team at John Ramsay High School in Bishop Lavis and helped the school become the runners-up in the 2018 Kay Motsepe Schools' Championships. He was playing for Ajax Cape Town when he was scouted by SuperSport United in 2018.

== Club career ==
=== SuperSport United ===
Appollis was contracted with SuperSport United before he was released.

=== University of Pretoria ===
Appollis was sent on loan to University of Pretoria, where he was reported to have scored two goals in 12 appearances for the National First Division club.

=== Pretoria Callies ===
After some months away from football, Appollis was recruited to the National First Division club Pretoria Callies by Kwanele Kopo, his former coach in the reserve league.

=== Polokwane City ===
Appollis featured for Polokwane City during the 2023–24 and 2024–25 seasons in the South African Premiership.

=== Orlando Pirates ===
He joined Orlando Pirates at the start of the 2025–26 season for a reported transfer fee in the region of R16 million rand. Appollis scored a goal on his debut against his former club Polokwane City and won the penalty that led to the second goal in the match that ended 2–0.

== International career ==
Appollis made his debut for South Africa as a substitute for Sphephelo Sithole in the 75th minute in a loss to Rwanda on 21 November 2023 during 2026 FIFA World Cup qualification.

His first two international goals for South Africa were scored against South Sudan during 2025 Africa Cup of Nations qualification.

On 1 December 2025, Appollis was called up to the South Africa squad for the 2025 Africa Cup of Nations. He scored his fourth goal of 2025 against Angola at the 2025 Africa Cup of Nations.

He was selected in South Africa's squad for the 2026 FIFA World Cup.

== Personal life ==
Appollis is from Bishop Lavis, Cape Town, South Africa. His father is a gangster. He has credited his success to his grandmother, Maureen Appollis, who supported and motivated him for his career in football.

Appollis enjoys playing video games such as FIFA and Call of Duty.

== Career statistics ==
=== Club ===
As of match played 31 October 2026

Appearances by club, season and competition
| Club | Season | League | | | Nedbank Cup | | Knockout Cup | | Continental (Note: Includes CAF Champions League.) | | MTN 8 | | Total | |
| Club | Season | Division | Apps | Goals | Apps | Goals | Apps | Goals | Apps | Goals | Apps | Goals | Apps | Goals |
|---|---|---|---|---|---|---|---|---|---|---|---|---|---|---|
| SuperSport United | 2019–20 | South African Premiership | 3 | 0 | 0 | 0 | 0 | 0 | — | | 0 | 0 | 3 | 0 |
| SuperSport United | 2020–21 | South African Premiership | 2 | 0 | 0 | 0 | 0 | 0 | — | | 0 | 0 | 2 | 0 |
| SuperSport United | Total | | 5 | 0 | 0 | 0 | 0 | 0 | — | | 0 | 0 | 5 | 0 |
| University of Pretoria F.C. (loan) | 2020–21 | National First Division | 12 | 2 | 0 | 0 | 0 | 0 | — | | — | | 12 | 2 |
| SuperSport United | 2021–22 | South African Premiership | 0 | 0 | 0 | 0 | 0 | 0 | — | | 0 | 0 | 0 | 0 |
| Pretoria Callies F.C. | 2022–23 | National First Division | 28 | 6 | 2 | 0 | 0 | 0 | — | | — | | 30 | 6 |
| Polokwane City | 2023–24 | South African Premiership | 29 | 6 | 0 | 0 | 2 | 1 | — | | — | | 31 | 7 |
| Polokwane City | 2024–25 | South African Premiership | 25 | 2 | 1 | 0 | 2 | 0 | — | | 1 | 0 | 29 | 2 |
| Polokwane City | Total | | 54 | 8 | 1 | 0 | 4 | 1 | — | | 1 | 0 | 60 | 9 |
| Orlando Pirates | 2025–26 | South African Premiership | 30 | 9 | 2 | 0 | 4 | 0 | 3 | 2 | 4 | 1 | 43 | 12 |
| Orlando Pirates | 2026–27 | South African Premiership | 9 | 2 | 0 | 0 | 0 | 0 | 0 | 0 | 4 | 0 | 13 | 2 |
| Orlando Pirates | Total | | 39 | 11 | 2 | 0 | 4 | 0 | 3 | 2 | 8 | 1 | 56 | 14 |
| Career total | | | 138 | 27 | 5 | 0 | 8 | 1 | 3 | 2 | 5 | 1 | 163 | 31 |

=== International ===
As of match played 30 September 2026

Appearances and goals by national team and year
| National team | Year | Apps | Goals |
|---|---|---|---|
| South Africa | 2023 | 1 | 0 |
| South Africa | 2024 | 11 | 2 |
| South Africa | 2025 | 11 | 5 |
| South Africa | 2026 | 11 | 1 |
| Total | | 34 | 8 |

Scores and results list South Africa's goal tally first, score column indicates score after each Appollis goal.

List of international goals scored by Oswin Appollis
| No. | Date | Venue | Cap | Opponent | Score | Result | Competition |
|---|---|---|---|---|---|---|---|
| 1. | 10 September 2024 | Juba Stadium, Juba, South Sudan | 8 | South Sudan | 1–1 | 3–2 | 2025 Africa Cup of Nations qualification |
| 2. | 10 September 2024 | Juba Stadium, Juba, South Sudan | 8 | South Sudan | 2–1 | 3–2 | 2025 Africa Cup of Nations qualification |
| 3. | 5 September 2025 | Free State Stadium, Bloemfontein, South Africa | 16 | Lesotho | 3–0 | 3–0 | 2026 FIFA World Cup qualification |
| 4. | 14 October 2025 | Mbombela Stadium, Mbombela, South Africa | 19 | Rwanda | 2–0 | 3–0 | 2026 FIFA World Cup qualification |
| 5. | 15 November 2025 | Nelson Mandela Bay Stadium, Gqeberha, South Africa | 20 | Zambia | 1–0 | 3–1 | Friendly |
| 6. | 22 December 2025 | Marrakesh Stadium, Marrakesh, Morocco | 21 | Angola | 1–0 | 2–1 | 2025 Africa Cup of Nations |
| 7. | 29 December 2025 | Marrakesh Stadium, Marrakesh, Morocco | 23 | Zimbabwe | 3–2 | 3–2 | 2025 Africa Cup of Nations |
| 8. | 27 March 2026 | Moses Mabhida Stadium, Durban, South Africa | 25 | Panama | 1–1 | 1–1 | Friendly |

== Honours ==
=== Orlando Pirates ===
- MTN 8: 2025
- Carling Knockout Cup: 2025
- Betway Premiership: 2025–26
