= 2025 Africa Cup of Nations =

African football tournament

كأس الأمم الإفريقية 2025 ⵜⴰⵙⴰ ⵏ ⵉⵎⵓⵔⵏ ⵏ ⵓⴼⵔⵉⴽⴰ 2025
- Official logo

Tournament details
- Host country: Morocco
- Dates: 21 December 2025 – 18 January 2026
- Teams: 24
- Venues: 9 (in 6 host cities)

Final positions
- Champions: Morocco (Note: The final match originally finished 1–0 for Senegal after extra time. On 17 March 2026, the CAF Appeal Board ruled that, per articles 82 and 84 of the competition regulations, when Senegal left the field and repeatedly refused to return from their dressing room, they had forfeited the game; the rules for forfeited games deem that the match, and the Championship, be awarded as a 3–0 win for Morocco.) (2nd title)
- Runners-up: Senegal
- Third place: Nigeria
- Fourth place: Egypt

Tournament statistics
- Matches played: 52
- Goals scored: 120 (2.31 per match)
- Attendance: 1,340,022 (25,770 per match)
- Top scorer(s): (Morocco) Brahim Díaz (5 goals)
- Best player: (Senegal) Sadio Mané
- Best goalkeeper: (Morocco) Yassine Bounou
- Fair play award: Morocco

The 2025 Africa Cup of Nations (Note: The tournament was known as the TotalEnergies 2025 Africa Cup of Nations for sponsorship purposes, and commonly referred to as 2025 AFCON or CAN 2025.) was the 35th edition of the Africa Cup of Nations, a biennial football tournament contested by the men's national teams of the Confederation of African Football (CAF). It was hosted by Morocco — the second time the country had hosted the tournament, after 1988 — following the stripping of hosting rights from Guinea due to inadequate preparations.

Due to a scheduling conflict with the expanded 2025 FIFA Club World Cup in June and July, the Africa Cup of Nations was played between 21 December 2025 and 18 January 2026 — the first time it was held over the Christmas and New Year period.

Defending champions Ivory Coast were eliminated in the quarter-finals by Egypt. The final between Senegal and hosts Morocco was marred by controversy after Senegal walked off the pitch for 17 minutes in protest over a disallowed goal and a VAR decision in stoppage time. Senegal returned to the pitch and won 1–0 after extra time, but on 17 March 2026 the CAF Appeal Board ruled that Senegal had forfeited the final through their actions, awarding Morocco a 3–0 victory. Senegal have subsequently appealed that decision. It was Morocco's second Africa Cup of Nations title, after their first in 1976.

== Host selection ==
CAF stripped Cameroon from hosting the 2019 edition of the tournament on 30 November 2018 due to lack of speed of progress in preparations, but accepted former CAF president Ahmad Ahmad's request to stage the next edition in 2021. Consequently, the original hosts of 2021, Ivory Coast, became hosts of the 2023 edition with Guinea instead hosting the 2025 edition, which until then had no hosts. The CAF President confirmed the timetable shift after a meeting with Ivorian president Alassane Ouattara in Abidjan, Ivory Coast on 30 January 2019. On 30 September 2022, current CAF president Patrice Motsepe announced that Guinea had been stripped as host for the 2025 edition due to inadequacy and speed of progress in hosting preparations. Consequently, a new process was re-opened for a replacement host bidder. On 27 September 2023, the 2025 edition was awarded to Morocco and the 2027 edition to Kenya, Tanzania, and Uganda.

== Marketing ==
=== Sponsorship ===
Official Title Sponsor	Official Global Partners	Official Competition Sponsors	Official Suppliers
TotalEnergies	1xBet; European Union; Orange Group; Puma; Royal Air Maroc; Suzuki; Tecno Mobile; Visa Inc.; Netflix	Apsonic; Danone; Konami (eFootball); LONACI; Midea Group; Morocco Now; OCP Group; ONCF; Unilever (Rexona); Visit Morocco	Acıbadem Healthcare Group; Africa Global Logistics; Bel Group (The Laughing Cow); Sidi Ali

=== Mascot ===
The tournament mascot, named Assad (Arabic: أسد), was revealed on 8 December 2025. It was a Barbary lion, a reference to Morocco's national animal and nickname of the national team of Morocco.

=== Match ball ===
On 10 November 2025, CAF and Puma unveiled Itri (Standard Moroccan Amazigh: ⵉⵜⵔⵉ, lit. 'star') as the official tournament edition match ball. The ball, covered in zellij art in red and green, was influenced by an ancient mosaic tradition known for its complex geometric decoration. Produced by Puma using Orbital 6 technology, the design combined star-based forms, floral motifs and circular patterns. A special edition was made for the final where the official match ball was recoloured in gold.

=== Official song ===
The official song was "Africallez" (a wordplay in French: Africa allez!, lit. 'Let's go Africa!'), which stood as one of the tournament's emblems. The song was performed by three artists: Beninese musician Angélique Kidjo, and Moroccan singers Lartiste and Jaylann.

== Prize money ==
The winners received US$10 million, an increase from US$7 million for the 2023 event.

== Qualification ==
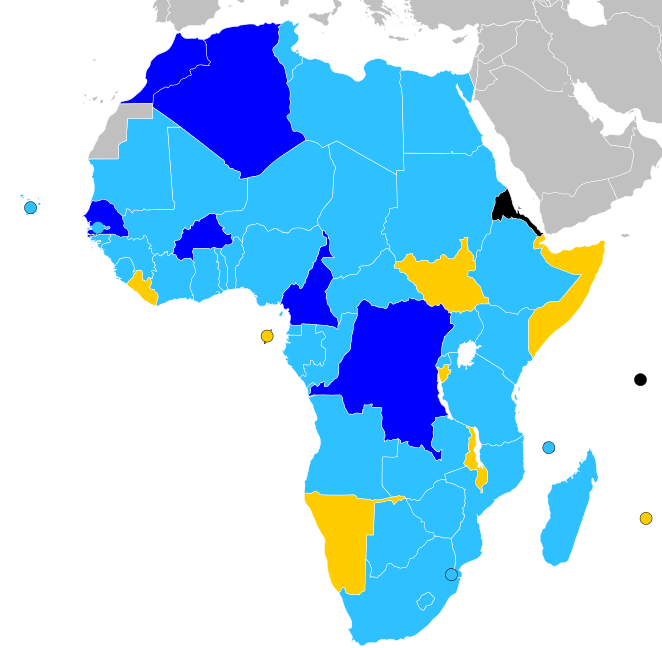
Qualified Failed to qualify Banned or did not enter Not a member of CAF

The qualifiers were held between 20 March and 19 November 2024, starting with the preliminary round (20–26 March 2024) and then the group stage (2 September–19 November 2024). The preliminary round draw was held on 20 February 2024, 14:00 CAT (UTC+2) at the CAF headquarters in Cairo, Egypt. The eight involved national teams were seeded into two pots of four based on the FIFA World Rankings from 15 February 2024, Eritrea and Seychelles were excluded from the qualifiers. The eight teams were split into four ties which were played in home-and-away two-legged format. The four winners (Chad, Eswatini, Liberia, and South Sudan) advanced to the group stage to join the 44 teams which entered directly. The group stage draw took place on 4 July 2024, 14:30 CAT (UTC+2) in Johannesburg, South Africa. The 48 national teams involved were divided into twelve groups of four each, which consisted of the 44 teams that entered directly, in addition to the four winners of the preliminary round, and were seeded into four pots of twelve each based on the June 2024 FIFA World Rankings.

=== Qualified teams ===
The following 24 teams qualified for this edition; all of them had previously participated in the tournament. Morocco, the host country, played in the qualifiers in Group B despite qualifying automatically. Ghana, four-time African champions, failed to qualify after finishing bottom of the Group F, missing out on the Africa Cup of Nations for the first time since 2004. Tunisia qualified for the 22nd time and extended their record for consecutive participations, reaching the tournament for the 17th time in a row, having not been absent since 1994. Comoros, Gabon, Sudan and Zimbabwe made their return to the continental tournament after missing out in 2023. Benin and Uganda made their return after an almost five-year absence from the event. Botswana qualified for the second time after their first participation in 2012. Cape Verde, Gambia, Guinea, Guinea-Bissau, Mauritania and Namibia also failed to qualify after appearing in 2023.

Team	Qualification method	Date of qualification	Appearance(s)				Previous best performance	WR
Team	Qualification method	Date of qualification	Total	First	Last	Streak	Previous best performance	WR
Morocco	Hosts / Group B winners	27 September 2023	20th	1972	2023	5	Champions (1976)	11
Burkina Faso	Group L runners-up	13 October 2024	14th	1978	2023	3	Runners-up (2013)	62
Cameroon	Group J winners	14 October 2024	22nd	1970	2023	6	Champions (1984, 1988, 2000, 2002, 2017)	57
Algeria	Group E winners	14 October 2024	21st	1968	2023	7	Champions (1990, 2019)	34
DR Congo	Group H winners	15 October 2024	21st	1965	2023	2	Champions (1968, 1974)	56
Senegal	Group L winners	15 October 2024	18th	1965	2023	6	Champions (2021)	19
Egypt	Group C winners	15 October 2024	27th	1957	2023	5	Champions (1957, 1959, 1986, 1998, 2006, 2008, 2010)	35
Angola	Group F winners	15 October 2024	10th	1996	2023	2	Quarter-finalists (2008, 2010, 2023)	89
Equatorial Guinea	Group E runners-up	13 November 2024	5th	2012	2023	3	Fourth place (2015)	97
Ivory Coast	Group G runners-up	13 November 2024	26th	1965	2023	11	Champions (1992, 2015, 2023)	42
Gabon	Group B runners-up	14 November 2024	9th	1994	2021	1	Quarter-finalists (1996, 2012)	78
Uganda	Group K runners-up	14 November 2024	8th	1962	2019	1	Runners-up (1978)	85
South Africa	Group K winners	14 November 2024	12th	1996	2023	2	Champions (1996)	61
Tunisia	Group A runners-up	14 November 2024	22nd	1962	2023	17	Champions (2004)	41
Nigeria	Group D winners	14 November 2024	21st	1963	2023	4	Champions (1980, 1994, 2013)	38
Mali	Group I winners	15 November 2024	14th	1972	2023	10	Runners-up (1972)	53
Zambia	Group G winners	15 November 2024	19th	1974	2023	2	Champions (2012)	91
Zimbabwe	Group J runners-up	15 November 2024	6th	2004	2021	1	Group stage (2004, 2006, 2017, 2019, 2021)	129
Comoros	Group A winners	15 November 2024	2nd	2021	2021	1	Round of 16 (2021)	109
Sudan	Group F runners-up	18 November 2024	10th	1957	2021	1	Champions (1970)	117
Benin	Group D runners-up	18 November 2024	5th	2004	2019	1	Quarter-finalists (2019)	92
Tanzania	Group H runners-up	19 November 2024	4th	1980	2023	2	Group stage (1980, 2019, 2023)	112
Botswana	Group C runners-up	19 November 2024	2nd	2012	2012	1	Group stage (2012)	138
Mozambique	Group I runners-up	19 November 2024	6th	1986	2023	2	Group stage (1986, 1996, 1998, 2010, 2023)	102

== Venues ==
Location of the Moroccan host cities of the 2025 Africa Cup of Nations
1 Agadir
2 Casablanca
3 Fez
4 Marrakesh
5 Rabat
6 Tangier

On 27 January 2025, the Confederation of African Football (CAF), together with the Royal Moroccan Football Federation and the Local Organizing Committee of the TotalEnergies CAF Africa Cup of Nations for Morocco 2025, announced the nine venues in six cities that would host matches in the competition.

List of host cities and stadiums
City	Stadium	Capacity	Image
Agadir	Adrar Stadium	46,000	
Casablanca	Stade Mohammed V	45,000	
Fez	Fez Stadium	45,000	
Marrakesh	Marrakesh Stadium	45,240	
Rabat	Prince Moulay Abdellah Stadium	69,500	
Rabat	Moulay El Hassan Stadium	22,000	
Rabat	Rabat Olympic Stadium	21,000	
Rabat	Al Medina Stadium	18,000	
Tangier	Tangier Grand Stadium	75,500	

== Match officials ==
=== Referees ===
On 26 November 2025, CAF released the complete list of match officials appointed for the tournament. The list included 73 officials in total: 28 referees, 31 assistant referees, and 14 VAR officials. All selected officials came exclusively from the African Confederation. Assistant referees officiated in multiple refereeing teams.

Refereeing teams
Country	Referee	Assistant referees	Matches assigned
Algeria	Mustapha Ghorbal	(Egypt) Mahmoud Ahmed Abouelregal (Angola) Jerson Emiliano Dos Santos	Ivory Coast–Cameroon (Group F)
Algeria	Mustapha Ghorbal	Abbes Akram Zerhouni; Adel Abane	Egypt–Ivory Coast (Quarter-final)
Algeria	Youcef Gamouh	Abbes Akram Zerhouni; Adel Abane	Senegal–DR Congo (Group D)
Benin	Djindo Louis Houngnandande	Aymar Ulrich Eric Ayimavo (Sudan) Mohammed Abdallah Ibrahim	Uganda–Nigeria (Group C)
Burundi	Pacifique Ndabihawenimana	(Senegal) Djibril Camara (Senegal) Nouha Bangoura	Egypt–South Africa (Group B)
Burundi	Pacifique Ndabihawenimana	(Mali) Modibo Samake (Zambia) Diana Chikotesha	Equatorial Guinea–Algeria (Group E)
Cameroon	Abdou Abdel Mefire	(Republic of the Congo) Danek Styven Moutsassi (Republic of the Congo) Yanes Malondi Chani	Morocco–Mali (Group A)
Cameroon	Abdou Abdel Mefire	Elvis Guy Noupue Nguegoue; Carine Atezambong Fomo	Nigeria–Mozambique (Round of 16)
Chad	Mahamat Alhadji Allaou	(Cameroon) Elvis Guy Noupue Nguegoue (Gabon) Amos Abeigne Ndong	Comoros–Mali (Group A)
Congo	Messie Jessie Oved Nkounkou Mvoutou	(Democratic Republic of the Congo) Guylain Nguila (Democratic Republic of the Congo) Gradel Mbilizi Mwanya	Equatorial Guinea–Sudan (Group E)
DR Congo	Jean-Jacques Ndala	Guylain Nguila; Gradel Mbilizi Mwanya	Morocco–Comoros (Group A); Tanzania–Tunisia (Group C); Senegal–Morocco (Final)
Egypt	Mohamed Mansour Maarouf	(Tunisia) Khalil Hassani; Ahmed Hossameldin Taha	Burkina Faso–Equatorial Guinea (Group E)
Egypt	Mohamed Mansour Maarouf	Mahmoud Ahmed Abouelregal; Ahmed Hossameldin Taha	Algeria–DR Congo (Round of 16)
Egypt	Amin Mohamed Omar	Mahmoud Ahmed Abouelregal; Ahmed Hossameldin Taha	Sudan–Burkina Faso (Group E)
Egypt	Amin Mohamed Omar	Mahmoud Ahmed Abouelregal (Algeria) Adel Abane	Cameroon–Gabon (Group F)
Gabon	Pierre Atcho	(Cameroon) Elvis Guy Noupue Nguegoue (Cameroon) Carine Atezambong Fomo	Algeria–Sudan (Group E)
Gabon	Pierre Atcho	Boris Marlaise Ditsoga (Republic of the Congo) Danek Styven Moutsassi	Senegal–Egypt (Semi-final)
Gabon	Pierre Atcho	Boris Marlaise Ditsoga; Amos Abeigne Ndong	Egypt–Benin (Round of 16)
Gabon	Tanguy Patrice Mebiame	Boris Marlaise Ditsoga; Amos Abeigne Ndong	Tunisia–Uganda (Group C)
Ghana	Daniel Nii Ayi Laryea	(South Africa) Zakhele Siwela (Lesotho) Souru Phatsoane	Algeria–Burkina Faso (Group E); Nigeria–Morocco (Semi-final)
Ivory Coast	Clement Franklin Kpan	(Madagascar) Dimbiniaina Andriatianarivelo (Togo) Jonathan Koffi Ahonto	Angola–Egypt (Group B)
Kenya	Peter Waweru Kamaku	Gilbert Kipkoech Cheruiyot; Stephen Elezar Onyango Yiembe	Angola–Zimbabwe (Group B); South Africa–Cameroon (Round of 16)
Mali	Boubou Traoré	Modibo Samake (Togo) Jonathan Koffi Ahonto	Nigeria–Tunisia (Group C); Morocco–Tanzania (Round of 16)
Mauritania	Abdel Aziz Bouh	(Mali) Modibo Samake (Togo) Jonathan Koffi Ahonto	Senegal–Botswana (Group D)
Mauritania	Dahane Beida	(Angola) Jerson Emiliano Dos Santos (Angola) Ivanildo Meirelles De Sanches Lopes	Nigeria–Tanzania (Group C); Senegal–Sudan (Round of 16); Cameroon–Morocco (Quarter-final)
Mauritius	Ahmed Imtehaz Heerallal	(Mozambique) Arsenio Chadreque Maringule (São Tomé and Príncipe) Abelmiro dos Reis Monte Negro	Zambia–Comoros (Group A)
Mauritius	Ahmed Imtehaz Heerallal	(Mozambique) Arsenio Chadreque Maringule (Angola) Ivanildo Meirelles De Sanches Lopes	Botswana–DR Congo (Group D)
Morocco	Jalal Jayed	Zakaria Brinsi; Mostafa Akarkad	Uganda–Tanzania (Group C); Mozambique–Cameroon (Group F); Egypt–Nigeria (Third place play-off)
Morocco	Mustapha Kechchaf	(Republic of the Congo) Danek Styven Moutsassi (Republic of the Congo) Yanes Malondi Chani	Zimbabwe–South Africa (Group B)
Rwanda	Samuel Uwikunda	(Benin) Aymar Ulrich Eric Ayimavo (Madagascar) Dimbiniaina Andriatianarivelo	Ivory Coast–Mozambique (Group F)
Rwanda	Samuel Uwikunda	(Kenya) Gilbert Kipkoech Cheruiyot (Kenya) Stephen Elezar Onyango Yiembe	Benin–Senegal (Group D)
Senegal	Issa Sy	Djibril Camara; Nouha Bangoura	Egypt–Zimbabwe (Group B); Zambia–Morocco (Group A); Algeria–Nigeria (Quarter-final)
Somalia	Omar Artan	(Djibouti) Liban Abdoulrazack Ahmed (São Tomé and Príncipe) Abelmiro dos Reis Monte Negro	Mali–Zambia (Group A); Gabon–Ivory Coast (Group F)
South Africa	Abongile Tom	Zakhele Siwela (Lesotho) Souru Phatsoane	DR Congo–Benin (Group D); Mali–Tunisia (Round of 16); Mali–Senegal (Quarter-final)
Sudan	Mahmood Ismail	Mohammed Abdallah Ibrahim (Kenya) Stephen Elezar Onyango Yiembe	South Africa–Angola (Group B)
Sudan	Mahmood Ismail	(Djibouti) Liban Abdoulrazack Ahmed (Madagascar) Dimbiniaina Andriatianarivelo	Ivory Coast–Burkina Faso (Round of 16)
Tunisia	Mehrez Melki	Khalil Hassani (Egypt) Ahmed Hossameldin Taha	Gabon–Mozambique (Group F)
Uganda	Shamirah Nabadda	(Zambia) Diana Chikotesha (Cameroon) Carine Atezambong Fomo	Benin–Botswana (Group D)

== Draw ==
The draw took place on 27 January 2025 at the Mohammed V National Theatre in Rabat. The draw was conducted by Mustapha Hadji (Morocco), Serge Aurier (Ivory Coast), Aliou Cissé (Senegal) and Joseph Yobo (Nigeria).

Pot 1	Pot 2	Pot 3	Pot 4
Morocco (hosts); Senegal; Egypt; Algeria; Nigeria; Ivory Coast (holders)	Cameroon; Mali; Tunisia; South Africa; DR Congo; Burkina Faso	Gabon; Angola; Zambia; Uganda; Equatorial Guinea; Benin	Mozambique; Comoros; Tanzania; Sudan; Zimbabwe; Botswana

== Group stage ==
The CAF announced the tournament schedule on 31 January 2025.

The top two teams of each group, along with the best four third-placed teams, advanced to the round of 16.

=== Tiebreakers ===
Teams were ranked according to the three points for a win system (3 points for a win, 1 for a draw, 0 points for a loss), and if tied on points, the following tiebreaking criteria were applied, in the order given, to determine the rankings (Regulations Article 74):

1. Points in head-to-head matches among tied teams;
2. Goal difference in head-to-head matches among tied teams;
3. Goals scored in head-to-head matches among tied teams;
4. If more than two teams were tied, and after applying all head-to-head criteria above, if two teams were still tied, all head-to-head criteria above were applied exclusively to these two teams;
5. Goal difference in all group matches;
6. Goals scored in all group matches;
7. Drawing of lots.

=== Group A ===
Pos	Team	Pld	W	D	L	GF	GA	GD	Pts	Qualification
1	Morocco (H)	3	2	1	0	6	1	+5	7	Advance to knockout stage
2	Mali	3	0	3	0	2	2	0	3	Advance to knockout stage
3	Comoros	3	0	2	1	0	2	−2	2	
4	Zambia	3	0	2	1	1	4	−3	2	

Source: CAF
(H) Hosts
21 December 2025
20:00

Morocco	2–0	Comoros
Brahim 55'; El Kaabi 74'	Report

Prince Moulay Abdellah Stadium, Rabat
Attendance: 60,180
Referee: Jean-Jacques Ndala (DR Congo)
22 December 2025
15:00

Mali	1–1	Zambia
Sinayoko 61'	Report	Daka 90+2'

Mohammed V Stadium, Casablanca
Attendance: 10,124
Referee: Omar Artan (Somalia)

26 December 2025
18:30

Zambia	0–0	Comoros
	Report

Mohammed V Stadium, Casablanca
Attendance: 7,829
Referee: Ahmad Heeralall (Mauritius)
26 December 2025
21:00

Morocco	1–1	Mali
Brahim 45+5' (pen.)	Report	Sinayoko 64' (pen.)

Prince Moulay Abdellah Stadium, Rabat
Attendance: 63,844
Referee: Abdou Mefire (Cameroon)

29 December 2025
20:00

Zambia	0–3	Morocco
	Report	El Kaabi 9', 50'; Brahim 27'

Prince Moulay Abdellah Stadium, Rabat
Attendance: 62,532
Referee: Issa Sy (Senegal)
29 December 2025
20:00

Comoros	0–0	Mali
	Report

Mohammed V Stadium, Casablanca
Attendance: 8,842
Referee: Mahamat Alhadji Allaou (Chad)

=== Group B ===
Pos	Team	Pld	W	D	L	GF	GA	GD	Pts	Qualification
1	Egypt	3	2	1	0	3	1	+2	7	Advance to knockout stage
2	South Africa	3	2	0	1	5	4	+1	6	Advance to knockout stage
3	Angola	3	0	2	1	2	3	−1	2	
4	Zimbabwe	3	0	1	2	4	6	−2	1	

Source: CAF
22 December 2025
18:00

South Africa	2–1	Angola
Appollis 21'; Foster 79'	Report	Show 35'

Marrakesh Stadium, Marrakesh
Attendance: 4,013
Referee: Mahmood Ismail (Sudan)
22 December 2025
21:00

Egypt	2–1	Zimbabwe
Marmoush 64'; Salah 90+1'	Report	Dube 20'

Adrar Stadium, Agadir
Attendance: 28,199
Referee: Issa Sy (Senegal)

26 December 2025
13:30

Angola	1–1	Zimbabwe
Dala 24'	Report	Musona 45+6'

Marrakesh Stadium, Marrakesh
Attendance: 5,110
Referee: Peter Waweru (Kenya)
26 December 2025
16:00

Egypt	1–0	South Africa
Salah 45' (pen.)	Report

Adrar Stadium, Agadir
Attendance: 40,219
Referee: Pacifique Ndabihawenimana (Burundi)

29 December 2025
17:00

Angola	0–0	Egypt
	Report

Adrar Stadium, Agadir
Attendance: 16,090
Referee: Clement Franklin Kpan (Ivory Coast)
29 December 2025
17:00

Zimbabwe	2–3	South Africa
Maswanhise 19'; Modiba 73' (o.g.)	Report	Moremi 7'; Foster 50'; Appollis 82' (pen.)

Marrakesh Stadium, Marrakesh
Attendance: 9,235
Referee: Mustapha Kechchaf (Morocco)

=== Group C ===
Pos	Team	Pld	W	D	L	GF	GA	GD	Pts	Qualification
1	Nigeria	3	3	0	0	8	4	+4	9	Advance to knockout stage
2	Tunisia	3	1	1	1	6	5	+1	4	Advance to knockout stage
3	Tanzania	3	0	2	1	3	4	−1	2	Advance to knockout stage
4	Uganda	3	0	1	2	3	7	−4	1	

Source: CAF
23 December 2025
18:30

Nigeria	2–1	Tanzania
Ajayi 36'; Lookman 52'	Report	M'Mombwa 50'

Fez Stadium, Fez
Attendance: 11,444
Referee: Dahane Beida (Mauritania)
23 December 2025
21:00

Tunisia	3–1	Uganda
Skhiri 10'; Achouri 40', 64'	Report	Omedi 90+2'

Rabat Olympic Stadium, Rabat
Attendance: 13,387
Referee: Patrice Mebiame (Gabon)

27 December 2025
18:30

Uganda	1–1	Tanzania
Ikpeazu 80'	Report	Msuva 59' (pen.)

Al Medina Stadium, Rabat
Attendance: 10,540
Referee: Jalal Jayed (Morocco)
27 December 2025
21:00

Nigeria	3–2	Tunisia
Osimhen 44'; Ndidi 50'; Lookman 67'	Report	Talbi 74'; Abdi 87' (pen.)

Fez Stadium, Fez
Attendance: 25,544
Referee: Boubou Traore (Mali)

30 December 2025
17:00

Uganda	1–3	Nigeria
Mato 75'	Report	Onuachu 28'; Onyedika 62', 67'

Fez Stadium, Fez
Attendance: 11,545
Referee: Djindo Louis Houngnandande (Benin)
30 December 2025
17:00

Tanzania	1–1	Tunisia
Salum 48'	Report	Gharbi 43' (pen.)

Rabat Olympic Stadium, Rabat
Attendance: 15,205
Referee: Jean-Jacques Ndala (DR Congo)

=== Group D ===
Pos	Team	Pld	W	D	L	GF	GA	GD	Pts	Qualification
1	Senegal	3	2	1	0	7	1	+6	7	Advance to knockout stage
2	DR Congo	3	2	1	0	5	1	+4	7	Advance to knockout stage
3	Benin	3	1	0	2	1	4	−3	3	Advance to knockout stage
4	Botswana	3	0	0	3	0	7	−7	0	

Source: CAF
23 December 2025
13:30

DR Congo	1–0	Benin
Bongonda 16'	Report

Al Medina Stadium, Rabat
Attendance: 13,073
Referee: Abongile Tom (South Africa)
23 December 2025
16:00

Senegal	3–0	Botswana
Jackson 40', 58'; C. Ndiaye 90'	Report

Tangier Grand Stadium, Tangier
Attendance: 18,591
Referee: Abdel Aziz Bouh (Mauritania)

27 December 2025
13:30

Benin	1–0	Botswana
Roche 28'	Report

Rabat Olympic Stadium, Rabat
Attendance: 7,462
Referee: Shamirah Nabadda (Uganda)
27 December 2025
16:00

Senegal	1–1	DR Congo
Mané 69'	Report	Bakambu 61'

Tangier Grand Stadium, Tangier
Attendance: 41,672
Referee: Lahlou Benbraham (Algeria)

30 December 2025
20:00

Benin	0–3	Senegal
	Report	Seck 38'; H. Diallo 62'; C. Ndiaye 90+7' (pen.)

Tangier Grand Stadium, Tangier
Attendance: 26,707
Referee: Samuel Uwikunda (Rwanda)
30 December 2025
20:00

Botswana	0–3	DR Congo
	Report	Mbuku 31'; Kakuta 41' (pen.), 60'

Al Medina Stadium, Rabat
Attendance: 12,569
Referee: Ahmad Heeralall (Mauritius)

=== Group E ===
Pos	Team	Pld	W	D	L	GF	GA	GD	Pts	Qualification
1	Algeria	3	3	0	0	7	1	+6	9	Advance to knockout stage
2	Burkina Faso	3	2	0	1	4	2	+2	6	Advance to knockout stage
3	Sudan	3	1	0	2	1	5	−4	3	Advance to knockout stage
4	Equatorial Guinea	3	0	0	3	2	6	−4	0	

Source: CAF
24 December 2025
13:30

Burkina Faso	2–1	Equatorial Guinea
Minoungou 90+5'; Tapsoba 90+8'	Report	Anieboh 85'

Mohammed V Stadium, Casablanca
Attendance: 10,267
Referee: Mohamed Maarouf (Egypt)
24 December 2025
16:00

Algeria	3–0	Sudan
Mahrez 2', 61'; Maza 85'	Report

Moulay Hassan Stadium, Rabat
Attendance: 16,115
Referee: Pierre Atcho (Gabon)

28 December 2025
16:00

Equatorial Guinea	0–1	Sudan
	Report	Coco 74' (o.g.)

Mohammed V Stadium, Casablanca
Attendance: 8,671
Referee: Messie Nkounkou (Congo)
28 December 2025
18:30

Algeria	1–0	Burkina Faso
Mahrez 23' (pen.)	Report

Moulay Hassan Stadium, Rabat
Attendance: 18,522
Referee: Daniel Nii Laryea (Ghana)

31 December 2025
17:00

Equatorial Guinea	1–3	Algeria
Nsue 50'	Report	Belaïd 19'; Chaïbi 25'; Maza 32'

Moulay Hassan Stadium, Rabat
Attendance: 15,187
Referee: Pacifique Ndabihawenimana (Burundi)
31 December 2025
17:00

Sudan	0–2	Burkina Faso
	Report	L. Traoré 16'; Kouassi 85'

Mohammed V Stadium, Casablanca
Attendance: 10,084
Referee: Amin Mohamed Omar (Egypt)

=== Group F ===
Pos	Team	Pld	W	D	L	GF	GA	GD	Pts	Qualification
1	Ivory Coast	3	2	1	0	5	3	+2	7	Advance to knockout stage
2	Cameroon	3	2	1	0	4	2	+2	7	Advance to knockout stage
3	Mozambique	3	1	0	2	4	5	−1	3	Advance to knockout stage
4	Gabon	3	0	0	3	4	7	−3	0	

Source: CAF
24 December 2025
18:30

Ivory Coast	1–0	Mozambique
Diallo 49'	Report

Marrakesh Stadium, Marrakesh
Attendance: 13,041
Referee: Samuel Uwikunda (Rwanda)
24 December 2025
21:00

Cameroon	1–0	Gabon
Etta Eyong 6'	Report

Adrar Stadium, Agadir
Attendance: 35,200
Referee: Amin Mohamed Omar (Egypt)

28 December 2025
13:30

Gabon	2–3	Mozambique
Aubameyang 45+5'; Moucketou-Moussounda 76'	Report	Bangal 37'; Catamo 42' (pen.); Calila 52'

Adrar Stadium, Agadir
Attendance: 9,796
Referee: Mehrez Melki (Tunisia)
28 December 2025
21:00

Ivory Coast	1–1	Cameroon
Diallo 51'	Report	Konan 56' (o.g.)

Marrakesh Stadium, Marrakesh
Attendance: 35,165
Referee: Mustapha Ghorbal (Algeria)

31 December 2025
20:00

Gabon	2–3	Ivory Coast
Kanga 11'; Bouanga 21'	Report	Krasso 44'; Guessand 84'; Touré 90+1'

Marrakesh Stadium, Marrakesh
Attendance: 20,833
Referee: Omar Artan (Somalia)
31 December 2025
20:00

Mozambique	1–2	Cameroon
Catamo 23'	Report	Nené 28' (o.g.); Kofane 55'

Adrar Stadium, Agadir
Attendance: 13,093
Referee: Jalal Jayed (Morocco)

=== Ranking of third-placed teams ===
Pos	Grp	Team	Pld	W	D	L	GF	GA	GD	Pts	Qualification
1	F	Mozambique	3	1	0	2	4	5	−1	3	Advance to knockout stage
2	D	Benin	3	1	0	2	1	4	−3	3	Advance to knockout stage
3	E	Sudan	3	1	0	2	1	5	−4	3	Advance to knockout stage
4	C	Tanzania	3	0	2	1	3	4	−1	2	Advance to knockout stage
5	B	Angola	3	0	2	1	2	3	−1	2	
6	A	Comoros	3	0	2	1	0	2	−2	2	

Source: CAF
Rules for classification: 1) Points; 2) Goal difference; 3) Goals scored; 4) Drawing of lots.

== Knockout stage ==
=== Bracket ===
Round of 16
3 January – Casablanca
Mali (p)	1 (3)
Tunisia	1 (2)
3 January – Tangier
Senegal	3
Sudan	1
5 January – Agadir
Egypt (a.e.t.)	3
Benin	1
6 January – Marrakesh
Ivory Coast	3
Burkina Faso	0
6 January – Rabat (Moulay El Hassan)
Algeria (a.e.t.)	1
DR Congo	0
5 January – Fez
Nigeria	4
Mozambique	0
4 January – Rabat (Al Medina)
South Africa	1
Cameroon	2
4 January – Rabat (Moulay Abdellah)
Morocco	1
Tanzania	0

Quarter-finals
9 January – Tangier
Mali	0
Senegal	1
10 January – Agadir
Egypt	3
Ivory Coast	2
10 January – Marrakesh
Algeria	0
Nigeria	2
9 January – Rabat (Moulay Abdellah)
Cameroon	0
Morocco	2

Semi-finals
14 January – Tangier
Senegal	1
Egypt	0
14 January – Rabat (Moulay Abdellah)
Nigeria	0 (2)
Morocco (p)	0 (4)

Final
18 January – Rabat (Moulay Abdellah)
Senegal	0
Morocco (awd.)	3
Third place play-off
17 January – Casablanca
Egypt	0 (2)
Nigeria (p)	0 (4)

=== Round of 16 ===
3 January 2026
17:00

Senegal	3–1	Sudan
P. Gueye 29', 45+3'; Mbaye 77'	Report	Abdallah 6'

Tangier Grand Stadium, Tangier
Attendance: 30,045
Referee: Dahane Beida (Mauritania)

3 January 2026
20:00

Mali	1–1 (a.e.t.)	Tunisia
Sinayoko 90+6' (pen.)	Report	Chaouat 88'
Penalties
Bissouma (penalty missed); Sinayoko (penalty scored); Dorgeles (penalty missed); Diakité (penalty scored); Touré (penalty scored)	3–2	(penalty scored) Meriah; (penalty missed) Abdi; (penalty scored) Saad; (penalty missed) Achouri; (penalty missed) Ben Romdhane

Mohammed V Stadium, Casablanca
Attendance: 41,982
Referee: Abongile Tom (South Africa)

4 January 2026
17:00

Morocco	1–0	Tanzania
Brahim 64'	Report

Prince Moulay Abdellah Stadium, Rabat
Attendance: 63,894
Referee: Boubou Traore (Mali)

4 January 2026
20:00

South Africa	1–2	Cameroon
Makgopa 88'	Report	Tchamadeu 34'; Kofane 47'

Al Medina Stadium, Rabat
Attendance: 14,127
Referee: Peter Waweru (Kenya)

5 January 2026
17:00

Egypt	3–1 (a.e.t.)	Benin
Attia 69'; Ibrahim 97'; Salah 120+4'	Report	Dossou 83'

Adrar Stadium, Agadir
Attendance: 20,191
Referee: Pierre Atcho (Gabon)

5 January 2026
20:00

Nigeria	4–0	Mozambique
Lookman 20'; Osimhen 25', 47'; Adams 75'	Report

Fez Stadium, Fez
Attendance: 14,593
Referee: Abdou Mefire (Cameroon)

6 January 2026
17:00

Algeria	1–0 (a.e.t.)	DR Congo
Boulbina 119'	Report

Moulay Hassan Stadium, Rabat
Attendance: 18,837
Referee: Mohamed Maarouf (Egypt)

6 January 2026
20:00

Ivory Coast	3–0	Burkina Faso
Diallo 20'; Y. Diomande 32'; Touré 87'	Report

Marrakesh Stadium, Marrakesh
Attendance: 24,019
Referee: Mahmood Ismail (Sudan)

=== Quarter-finals ===
9 January 2026
17:00

Mali	0–1	Senegal
	Report	I. Ndiaye 27'

Tangier Grand Stadium, Tangier
Attendance: 32,385
Referee: Abongile Tom (South Africa)

9 January 2026
20:00

Cameroon	0–2	Morocco
	Report	Brahim 26'; Saibari 74'

Prince Moulay Abdellah Stadium, Rabat
Attendance: 64,178
Referee: Dahane Beida (Mauritania)

10 January 2026
17:00

Algeria	0–2	Nigeria
	Report	Osimhen 47'; Adams 57'

Marrakesh Stadium, Marrakesh
Attendance: 32,452
Referee: Issa Sy (Senegal)

10 January 2026
20:00

Egypt	3–2	Ivory Coast
Marmoush 4'; Rabia 32'; Salah 52'	Report	Fatouh 40' (o.g.); Doué 73'

Adrar Stadium, Agadir
Attendance: 31,213
Referee: Mustapha Ghorbal (Algeria)

=== Semi-finals ===
14 January 2026
18:00

Senegal	1–0	Egypt
Mané 78'	Report

Tangier Grand Stadium, Tangier
Attendance: 52,079
Referee: Pierre Atcho (Gabon)

14 January 2026
21:00

Nigeria	0–0 (a.e.t.)	Morocco
	Report
Penalties
Onuachu (penalty scored); Chukwueze (penalty missed); Dele-Bashiru (penalty scored); Onyemaechi (penalty missed)	2–4	(penalty scored) El Aynaoui; (penalty missed) Igamane; (penalty scored) Ben Seghir; (penalty scored) Hakimi; (penalty scored) En-Nesyri

Prince Moulay Abdellah Stadium, Rabat
Attendance: 65,458
Referee: Daniel Nii Laryea (Ghana)

=== Third place play-off ===
17 January 2026
17:00

Egypt	0–0	Nigeria
	Report
Penalties
Salah (penalty missed); Marmoush (penalty missed); Rabia (penalty scored); Saber (penalty scored)	2–4	(penalty missed) Dele-Bashiru; (penalty scored) Adams; (penalty scored) Simon; (penalty scored) Iwobi; (penalty scored) Lookman

Mohammed V Stadium, Casablanca
Attendance: 38,113
Referee: Jalal Jayed (Morocco)

=== Final ===
18 January 2026
20:00

Senegal	0–3 Awarded	Morocco
P. Gueye 94'	Report

Prince Moulay Abdellah Stadium, Rabat
Attendance: 66,526
Referee: Jean-Jacques Ndala (DR Congo)

== Statistics ==
=== Goalscorers ===
There were 120 goals scored in 52 matches, for an average of 2.31 goals per match.

5 goals

- (Morocco) Brahim Díaz

4 goals

- (Egypt) Mohamed Salah
- (Nigeria) Victor Osimhen

3 goals

- (Algeria) Riyad Mahrez
- (Ivory Coast) Amad Diallo
- (Mali) Lassine Sinayoko
- (Morocco) Ayoub El Kaabi
- (Nigeria) Ademola Lookman

2 goals

- (Algeria) Ibrahim Maza
- (Cameroon) Christian Kofane
- (Democratic Republic of the Congo) Gaël Kakuta
- (Egypt) Omar Marmoush
- (Ivory Coast) Bazoumana Touré
- (Mozambique) Geny Catamo
- (Nigeria) Akor Adams
- (Nigeria) Raphael Onyedika
- (Senegal) Nicolas Jackson
- (Senegal) Sadio Mané
- (Senegal) Cherif Ndiaye
- (Senegal) Pape Gueye
- (South Africa) Oswin Appollis
- (South Africa) Lyle Foster
- (Tunisia) Elias Achouri

1 goal

- (Algeria) Zineddine Belaïd
- (Algeria) Adil Boulbina
- (Algeria) Farès Chaïbi
- (Angola) Gelson Dala
- (Angola) Show
- (Benin) Jodel Dossou
- (Benin) Yohan Roche
- (Burkina Faso) Arsène Kouassi
- (Burkina Faso) Georgi Minoungou
- (Burkina Faso) Edmond Tapsoba
- (Burkina Faso) Lassina Traoré
- (Cameroon) Karl Etta Eyong
- (Cameroon) Junior Tchamadeu
- (Democratic Republic of the Congo) Cédric Bakambu
- (Democratic Republic of the Congo) Théo Bongonda
- (Democratic Republic of the Congo) Nathanaël Mbuku
- (Egypt) Marwan Attia
- (Egypt) Yasser Ibrahim
- (Egypt) Ramy Rabia
- (Equatorial Guinea) Marvin Anieboh
- (Equatorial Guinea) Emilio Nsue
- (Gabon) Pierre-Emerick Aubameyang
- (Gabon) Denis Bouanga
- (Gabon) Guélor Kanga
- (Gabon) Alex Moucketou-Moussounda
- (Ivory Coast) Yan Diomande
- (Ivory Coast) Guéla Doué
- (Ivory Coast) Evann Guessand
- (Ivory Coast) Jean-Philippe Krasso
- (Morocco) Ismael Saibari
- (Mozambique) Faisal Bangal
- (Mozambique) Diogo Calila
- (Nigeria) Semi Ajayi
- (Nigeria) Wilfred Ndidi
- (Nigeria) Paul Onuachu
- (Senegal) Habib Diallo
- (Senegal) Ibrahim Mbaye
- (Senegal) Iliman Ndiaye
- (Senegal) Abdoulaye Seck
- (South Africa) Evidence Makgopa
- (South Africa) Tshepang Moremi
- (Sudan) Aamir Abdallah
- (Tanzania) Charles M'Mombwa
- (Tanzania) Simon Msuva
- (Tanzania) Feisal Salum
- (Tunisia) Ali Abdi
- (Tunisia) Firas Chaouat
- (Tunisia) Ismaël Gharbi
- (Tunisia) Ellyes Skhiri
- (Tunisia) Montassar Talbi
- (Uganda) Uche Ikpeazu
- (Uganda) Rogers Mato
- (Uganda) Denis Omedi
- (Zambia) Patson Daka
- (Zimbabwe) Prince Dube
- (Zimbabwe) Tawanda Maswanhise
- (Zimbabwe) Knowledge Musona

1 own goal

- (Egypt) Ahmed Fatouh (against Ivory Coast)
- (Equatorial Guinea) Saúl Coco (against Sudan)
- (Ivory Coast) Ghislain Konan (against Cameroon)
- (Mozambique) Nené (against Cameroon)
- (South Africa) Aubrey Modiba (against Zimbabwe)

=== Discipline ===
A player was automatically suspended for the next match for the following offences:

- Receiving a red card (red card suspensions could be extended for serious offences)
- Receiving two yellow cards in two matches

After the end of the group matches, all cautions received were cancelled for the rest of the competition. Nevertheless, a player having collected two yellow cards sustained the one match suspension.

The following suspensions occurred during the tournament:

Player(s)/Official(s)	Offence(s)	Suspension(s)
Group stage suspensions
(Equatorial Guinea) Basilio Ndong	(red card) in Group E vs Burkina Faso (matchday 1; 24 December 2025)	Group E vs Sudan (matchday 2; 28 December 2025)
(Sudan) Salah Adel	(yellow card) (yellow-red card) in Group E vs Algeria (matchday 1; 24 December 2025)	Group E vs Equatorial Guinea (matchday 2; 28 December 2025)
(Egypt) Mohamed Hany	(yellow card) (yellow-red card) in Group B vs South Africa (matchday 2; 26 December 2025)	Group B vs Angola (matchday 3; 29 December 2025)
(Mali) Aliou Dieng	(yellow card) in Group A vs Zambia (matchday 1; 22 December 2025); (yellow card) in Group A vs Morocco (matchday 2; 26 December 2025)	Group A vs Comoros (matchday 3; 29 December 2025)
(Cameroon) Junior Tchamadeu	(yellow card) in Group F vs Gabon (matchday 1; 24 December 2025); (yellow card) in Group F vs Ivory Coast (matchday 2; 28 December 2025)	Group F vs Mozambique (matchday 3; 31 December 2025)
(Zambia) Kings Kangwa	(red card) in Group A vs Morocco (matchday 3; 29 December 2025)	Suspension to be served outside of tournament
(Uganda) Uche Ikpeazu	(yellow card) in Group C vs Tanzania (matchday 2; 27 December 2025); (yellow card) in Group C vs Nigeria (matchday 3; 30 December 2025)	Suspension to be served outside of tournament
(Uganda) Jamal Salim	(red card) in Group C vs Nigeria (matchday 3; 30 December 2025)	Suspension to be served outside of tournament
(Equatorial Guinea) Iban Salvador	(yellow card) in Group E vs Burkina Faso (matchday 1; 24 December 2025); (yellow card) in Group E vs Algeria (matchday 3; 31 December 2025)	Suspension to be served outside of tournament
(Gabon) Didier Ndong	(yellow card) in Group F vs Cameroon (matchday 1; 24 December 2025); (yellow card) in Group F vs Ivory Coast (matchday 3; 31 December 2025)	Suspension to be served outside of tournament
Knockout stage suspensions
(Mali) Amadou Haidara	(red card) in Group A vs Comoros (matchday 3; 29 December 2025)	Round of 16 vs Tunisia (3 January 2026)
(Senegal) Kalidou Koulibaly	(red card) in Group D vs Benin (matchday 3; 30 December 2025)	Round of 16 vs Sudan (3 January 2026)
(Benin) Abdoul Moumini	(yellow card) in Group D vs DR Congo (matchday 1; 23 December 2025); (yellow card) in Group D vs Senegal (matchday 3; 30 December 2025)	Round of 16 vs Egypt (5 January 2026)
(Mali) Woyo Coulibaly	(red card) in Round of 16 vs Tunisia (3 January 2026)	Quarter-finals vs Senegal (9 January 2026)
(Mali) Yves Bissouma	(yellow card) in Round of 16 vs Tunisia (3 January 2026); (yellow card) (yellow-red card) in Quarter-finals vs Senegal (9 January 2026)	Suspension to be served outside of tournament
(Cameroon) Nouhou Tolo	(yellow card) in Round of 16 vs South Africa (4 January 2026); (yellow card) in Quarter-finals vs Morocco (9 January 2026)	Suspension to be served outside of tournament
(Nigeria) Wilfred Ndidi	(yellow card) in Round of 16 vs Mozambique (5 January 2026); (yellow card) in Quarter-finals vs Algeria (10 January 2026)	Semi-finals vs Morocco (14 January 2026)
(Algeria) Anis Hadj Moussa	(yellow card) in Round of 16 vs DR Congo (6 January 2026); (yellow card) in Quarter-finals vs Nigeria (10 January 2026)	Suspension to be served outside of tournament
(Egypt) Hossam Abdelmaguid	(yellow card) in Quarter-finals vs Ivory Coast (10 January 2026); (yellow card) in Semi-finals vs Senegal (14 January 2026)	Third place play-off vs Nigeria (17 January 2026)
(Nigeria) Calvin Bassey	(yellow card) in Round of 16 vs Mozambique (5 January 2026); (yellow card) in Semi-finals vs Morocco (14 January 2026)	Third place play-off vs Egypt (17 January 2026)
(Senegal) Kalidou Koulibaly	(yellow card) in Quarter-finals vs Mali (9 January 2026); (yellow card) in Semi-finals vs Egypt (14 January 2026)	Final vs Morocco (18 January 2026)
(Senegal) Habib Diarra	(yellow card) in Quarter-finals vs Mali (9 January 2026); (yellow card) in Semi-finals vs Egypt (14 January 2026)	Final vs Morocco (18 January 2026)

=== Final ranking ===
Matches that ended in extra time were counted as wins and defeats, while matches that ended in a penalty shoot-out were counted as draws.

Results of countries participating in AFCON 2025: Champion Runner-up Third place Fourth place / Quarter-finals Round of 16 Group stage

Pos.	Team	G	Pld	W	D	L	Pts	GF	GA	GD
1	Morocco	A	7	5	2	0	17	12	1	+11
2	Senegal	D	7	5	1	1	16	12	5	+7
3	Nigeria	C	7	5	2	0	17	14	4	+10
4	Egypt	B	7	4	2	1	14	9	4	+5
Eliminated in the quarter-finals
5	Algeria	E	5	4	0	1	12	8	3	+5
6	Ivory Coast	F	5	3	1	1	10	10	6	+4
7	Cameroon	F	5	3	1	1	10	6	5	+1
8	Mali	A	5	0	4	1	4	3	4	−1
Eliminated in the round of 16
9	DR Congo	D	4	2	1	1	7	5	2	+3
10	South Africa	B	4	2	0	2	6	6	5	+1
11	Burkina Faso	E	4	2	0	2	6	4	5	−1
12	Tunisia	C	4	1	2	1	5	7	6	+1
13	Mozambique	F	4	1	0	3	3	4	9	−5
14	Benin	D	4	1	0	3	3	2	7	−5
15	Sudan	E	4	1	0	3	3	2	8	−6
16	Tanzania	C	4	0	2	2	2	3	5	−2
Eliminated in the group stage
17	Angola	B	3	0	2	1	2	2	3	−1
18	Comoros	A	3	0	2	1	2	0	2	−2
19	Zambia	A	3	0	2	1	2	1	4	−3
20	Zimbabwe	B	3	0	1	2	1	4	6	−2
21	Uganda	C	3	0	1	2	1	3	7	−4
22	Gabon	F	3	0	0	3	0	4	7	−3
23	Equatorial Guinea	E	3	0	0	3	0	2	6	−4
24	Botswana	D	3	0	0	3	0	0	7	−7

== Awards ==
The following Africa Cup of Nations awards were given at the conclusion of the tournament: the Player of the Tournament (best overall player), the Puma Golden Boot (top goalscorer), the Golden Glove (best goalkeeper) and the Fair Play Award.

Best Player
(Senegal) Sadio Mané
Golden Boot
(Morocco) Brahim Díaz (5 goals)
Golden Glove
(Morocco) Yassine Bounou
Fair Play Award
Morocco

=== Best XI ===
Goalkeeper	Defenders	Midfielders	Forwards
(Morocco) Yassine Bounou	(Morocco) Achraf Hakimi (Senegal) Moussa Niakhaté (Nigeria) Calvin Bassey (Morocco) Noussair Mazraoui	(Nigeria) Ademola Lookman (Senegal) Idrissa Gueye (Senegal) Pape Gueye	(Morocco) Brahim Díaz (Nigeria) Victor Osimhen (Senegal) Sadio Mané

=== Man of the match ===
The Man of the Match award was presented after each match during the tournament. The award, presented by TotalEnergies, included an official trophy handed to the player at the end of the match.

Stage	Team 1	Result	Team 2	Man of the Match
Group stage matches
Group A	Morocco	2–0	Comoros	(Morocco) Brahim Díaz
Group A	Mali	1–1	Zambia	(Mali) Lassine Sinayoko
Group B	South Africa	2–1	Angola	(South Africa) Lyle Foster
Group B	Egypt	2–1	Zimbabwe	(Egypt) Omar Marmoush
Group D	DR Congo	1–0	Benin	(Democratic Republic of the Congo) Théo Bongonda
Group D	Senegal	3–0	Botswana	(Senegal) Nicolas Jackson
Group C	Nigeria	2–1	Tanzania	(Nigeria) Semi Ajayi
Group C	Tunisia	3–1	Uganda	(Tunisia) Elias Achouri
Group E	Burkina Faso	2–1	Equatorial Guinea	(Burkina Faso) Edmond Tapsoba
Group E	Algeria	3–0	Sudan	(Algeria) Riyad Mahrez
Group F	Ivory Coast	1–0	Mozambique	(Ivory Coast) Amad Diallo
Group F	Cameroon	1–0	Gabon	(Cameroon) Bryan Mbeumo
Group B	Angola	1–1	Zimbabwe	(Angola) Fredy
Group B	Egypt	1–0	South Africa	(Egypt) Mohamed El Shenawy
Group A	Zambia	0–0	Comoros	(Comoros) Zaydou Youssouf
Group A	Morocco	1–1	Mali	(Morocco) Neil El Aynaoui
Group D	Benin	1–0	Botswana	(Benin) Yohan Roche
Group D	Senegal	1–1	DR Congo	(Senegal) Sadio Mané
Group C	Uganda	1–1	Tanzania	(Tanzania) Simon Msuva
Group C	Nigeria	3–2	Tunisia	(Nigeria) Ademola Lookman
Group F	Gabon	2–3	Mozambique	(Mozambique) Geny Catamo
Group E	Equatorial Guinea	0–1	Sudan	(Sudan) Mohamed Eisa
Group E	Algeria	1–0	Burkina Faso	(Algeria) Ibrahim Maza
Group F	Ivory Coast	1–1	Cameroon	(Ivory Coast) Amad Diallo (2)
Group B	Zimbabwe	2–3	South Africa	(South Africa) Oswin Appollis
Group B	Angola	0–0	Egypt	(Angola) Fredy (2)
Group A	Comoros	0–0	Mali	(Mali) Mamadou Sangare
Group A	Zambia	0–3	Morocco	(Morocco) Ayoub El Kaabi
Group C	Tanzania	1–1	Tunisia	(Tunisia) Ismaël Gharbi
Group C	Uganda	1–3	Nigeria	(Nigeria) Raphael Onyedika
Group D	Botswana	0–3	DR Congo	(Democratic Republic of the Congo) Gaël Kakuta
Group D	Benin	0–3	Senegal	(Senegal) Abdoulaye Seck
Group E	Sudan	0–2	Burkina Faso	(Burkina Faso) Arsène Kouassi
Group E	Equatorial Guinea	1–3	Algeria	(Algeria) Anis Hadj Moussa
Group F	Mozambique	1–2	Cameroon	(Cameroon) Christian Kofane
Group F	Gabon	2–3	Ivory Coast	(Ivory Coast) Christ Inao Oulaï
Knockout stage matches
Round of 16	Senegal	3–1	Sudan	(Senegal) Pape Gueye
Round of 16	Mali	1–1 (a.e.t.) (3–2 p)	Tunisia	(Mali) Djigui Diarra
Round of 16	Morocco	1–0	Tanzania	(Morocco) Brahim Díaz (2)
Round of 16	South Africa	1–2	Cameroon	(Cameroon) Carlos Baleba
Round of 16	Egypt	3–1 (a.e.t.)	Benin	(Egypt) Yasser Ibrahim
Round of 16	Nigeria	4–0	Mozambique	(Nigeria) Ademola Lookman (2)
Round of 16	Algeria	1–0 (a.e.t.)	DR Congo	(Algeria) Adil Boulbina
Round of 16	Ivory Coast	3–0	Burkina Faso	(Ivory Coast) Amad Diallo (3)
Quarter-finals	Mali	0–1	Senegal	(Senegal) Iliman Ndiaye
Quarter-finals	Cameroon	0–2	Morocco	(Morocco) Ismael Saibari
Quarter-finals	Algeria	0–2	Nigeria	(Nigeria) Victor Osimhen
Quarter-finals	Egypt	3–2	Ivory Coast	(Egypt) Mohamed Salah
Semi-finals	Senegal	1–0	Egypt	(Senegal) Sadio Mané (2)
Semi-finals	Nigeria	0–0 (a.e.t.) (2–4 p)	Morocco	(Morocco) Yassine Bounou
Third place play-off	Egypt	0–0 (2–4 p)	Nigeria	(Nigeria) Stanley Nwabali
Final	Senegal	0–3 (w/o)	Morocco	(Senegal) Pape Gueye (2)

== Final controversies ==
During the final of the tournament, contested between Senegal and Morocco, the score remained level at 0–0 for most of regulation time. In the fifth minute of stoppage time, referee Jean-Jacques Ndala whistled a foul during a buildup that led to Senegal scoring what seemed initially as a valid goal by Ismaïla Sarr. Abdoulaye Seck had come into contact with Achraf Hakimi after which the latter fell to the ground. VAR could not be consulted since the "goal" was scored after the referee's whistle.

A few minutes later, in the eighth minute of stoppage time, Brahim Díaz was held by Senegalese defender El Hadji Malick Diouf, an action that was sanctioned as a penalty kick after VAR review. Disagreeing with the referee’s decisions, Senegal head coach Pape Thiaw instructed his players to leave the pitch in protest. The match was suspended for approximately 15 minutes, after which the Senegalese players returned to the field. It was during the VAR review and while play was suspended that unrest broke out among fans in the stands behind the goal of Moroccan goalkeeper Yassine Bounou. Several Senegalese hooligans attempted to storm the pitch while throwing chairs and other objects. Clashes erupted with stewards and security personnel, many being hit and kicked by the hooligans. Later, police in protective gear gathered in front of the affected stands and carried out charges. Police and stewards eventually formed a barrier separating those supporters from the rest of the crowd until after the match was over.

The match eventually resumed while tensions remained evident on the other side of the field of play. Brahim Díaz took the penalty, but his attempt was saved by Senegal goalkeeper Édouard Mendy, and regulation time ended with the score still tied at 0–0.

At least one steward was seriously injured and had to be taken off on a stretcher, prompting concern and circulating social‑media claims that the steward might have died. However, Moroccan authorities, including the General Directorate for National Security, denied that any steward or stadium worker had died as a result of the clashes, stating that no such fatality was recorded and that reports of a death were false. In total, 18 Senegalese fans and one Algerian fan were arrested in connection with the disturbances. The defendants will stand trial at the Rabat First Criminal Court, facing multiple charges, including participating in violent acts during a sporting event, forcibly entering the pitch, damaging sporting facilities, assaulting law enforcement officers and public forces, throwing objects, causing harm and throwing liquids, causing damage.

The day after the final, the Royal Moroccan Football Federation announced that it would file a complaint against Senegal with FIFA and CAF, alleging that the events prior to the penalty kick "affected the normal development of the match and the performance of the players". On the same day, CAF released a public statement condemning "the unacceptable behaviour of some players and officials" during the final. Gianni Infantino reacted on these events condemning "the behaviour of some "supporters" as well as some Senegalese players and technical staff members".

== Disciplinary ruling ==
On 17 March 2026, the CAF Appeal Board overturned the result of the final, in which Senegal had originally won on the field, and awarded a 3–0 victory to Morocco.

The ruling cited Article 84 of the Africa Cup of Nations regulations, which provides for a forfeit if a team leaves the field of play without the referee’s permission. As a result, Morocco were officially recognized as champions of the tournament.

The decision drew criticism in Senegal and received significant media attention internationally. Several outlets highlighted the unusual nature of overturning the result of a completed final and questioned the interpretation of the regulations. The Senegalese Football Federation appealed the decision to the Court of Arbitration for Sport (CAS).

CAS acknowledged receipt of an appeal by Senegal at the end of March. Senegal is still in possession of the trophy, as it has refused to hand it over to the Moroccan national team.

== Broadcasting ==
Below is the list of the 2025 AFCON broadcasting rights holders:

Territory	Rights holder(s)	Source(s)
Afghanistan	Tolo Sport	
Algeria	EPTV	
Angola	TPA	
Australia	beIN Sports	
Austria	Sportdigital	
Belgium	Tipik, La Une	
Benin	Bénin TV	
(Bosnia and Herzegovina) Bosnia	SportKlub	
Brazil	TV Bandeirantes	
Bulgaria	Max Sport	
Burkina Faso	RTB TV	
Cameroon	CRTV Sports, Canal 2 International	
Canada	beIN Sports	
(Caribbean Community) Caribbean	beIN Sports	
Colombia	Win Sports	
(Republic of the Congo) Congo	Tele Congo	
(Democratic Republic of the Congo) Congo DR	RTNC	
Croatia	SportKlub	
Equatorial Guinea	TVGE	
Ethiopia	ETV	
France	beIN Sports	
Gabon	Gabon TV	
Germany	Sportdigital, DAZN	
Greece	ERT	
Guinea	RTG	
Hispanic America	Claro Sports	
Hong Kong	beIN Sports	
India	FanCode	
Iran	IRIB Varzesh, Persiana Sports, GEM Sport	
Iraq	Al Rabiaa	
(Republic of Ireland) Ireland	Channel 4	*(most games on channel 4seven, which is not widely available in Ireland)
Israel	Sport 5	
Italy	Sportitalia, Solo Calcio	
Ivory Coast	RTI, Canal+ Afrique, NCI	
Japan	DAZN	
Kazakhstan	Megogo, Sport+Qazaqstan	
Mali	ORTM	
(Middle East and North Africa) MENA	beIN Sports	
Mexico	Fox	
Montenegro	SportKlub	
Morocco	SNRT	
Mozambique	TV Miramar	
Netherlands	Ziggo Sport	
New Zealand	beIN Sports	
Nigeria	BON, NTA, StarTimes, Afrosport	
Norway	VGTV	
Poland	Megogo	
Portugal	Sport TV	
Russia	Ökko	
Senegal	RTS	
Serbia	Arena Sport	
Slovenia	SportKlub	
South Africa	SABC Sport	
Southeast Asia	beIN Sports	
South Korea	STN Sports	
Spain	Movistar Plus+	
Sub-Saharan Africa	SuperSport	
Switzerland	Sportdigital	
Tanzania	Azam Sports	
Togo	TVT Internacional	
Turkey	Exxen	
Ukraine	Megogo	
Uganda	UBC, STAR TV	
United Kingdom	Channel 4	
United States	beIN Sports, Fubo TV, Fanatiz	
Zambia	ZNBC	
Zimbabwe	ZBC	

== See also ==
- 2024 African Nations Championship
- 2024 Women's Africa Cup of Nations
- 2025 U-20 Africa Cup of Nations
- 2025 U-17 Africa Cup of Nations
