= Dynamos Football Club =

Dynamos Football Club may refer to:

- Dynamos F.C. (South Africa), a South African football club
- Dynamos F.C., a Zimbabwean football club
- Dynamos FC (Bahamas), a Bahamanian football club
