= Souru Phatsoane =

- Born: Souru Phatšoane; 5 August 1988 (age 38); Tšenola, Lesotho

International
Years	League	Role

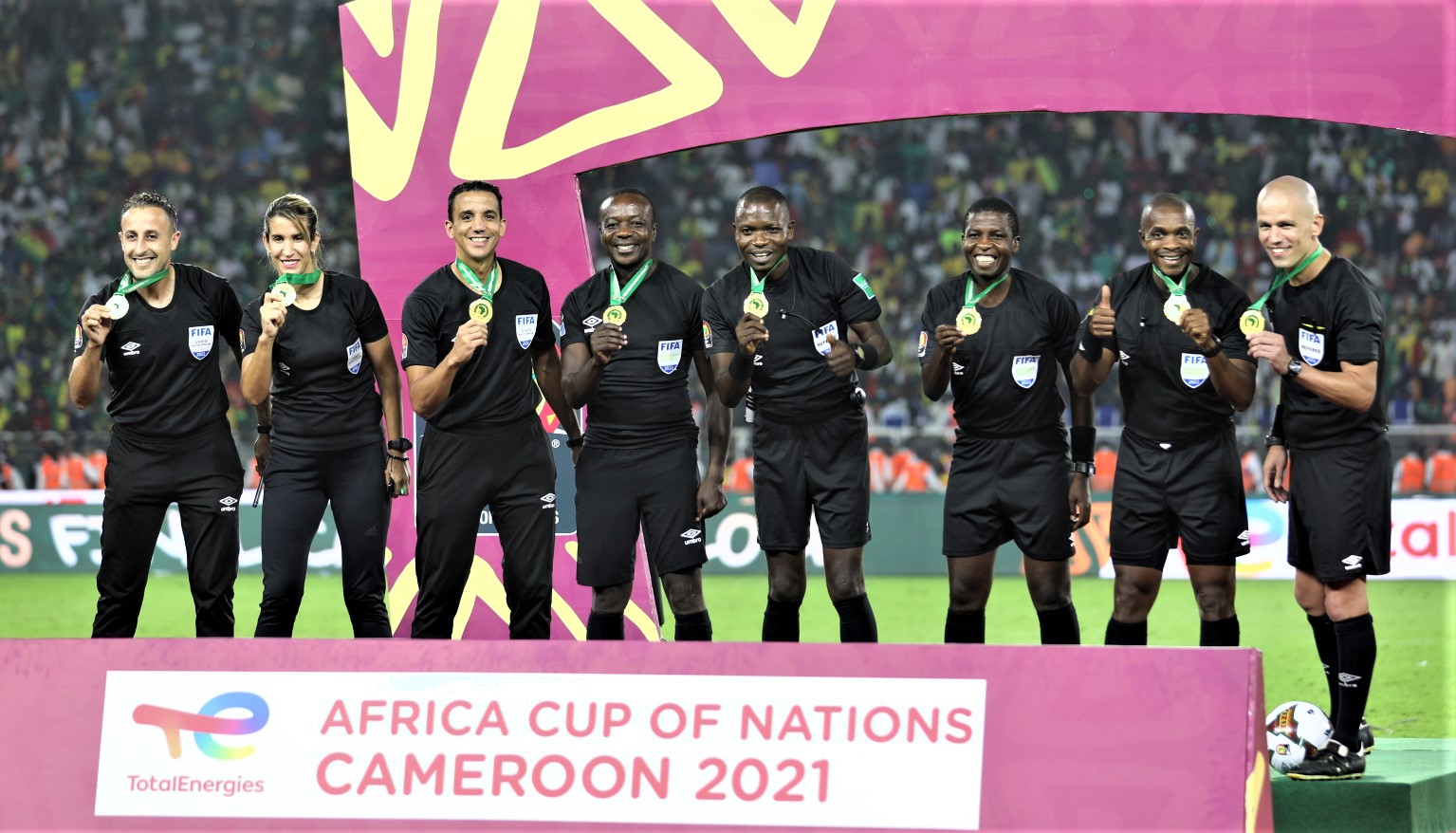
Phatsoane (third from right) at the 2021 Africa Cup of Nations final.

Souru Phatsoane (born 5 August 1988) is an international football referee from Lesotho who is a listed international referee for FIFA since 2012.

== Refereeing ==
He officiated as an assistant referee at the 2019 FIFA U-17 World Cup.

In 2025 he was appointed for his fourth consecutive AFCON at the 2025 Africa Cup of Nations.

== Honours ==
Lesotho Annual Sport Awards: 2025 Referee of the Year
