= Adrar Stadium =

Sports venue in Agadir, Morocco

Coordinates: 30.4272°N 9.5404°W

Adrar Stadium Grand Stade d'Agadir
- ملعب أدرار / ⴰⴱⴰⵔⴰⵣ ⵏ ⴰⴷⵔⴰⵔ
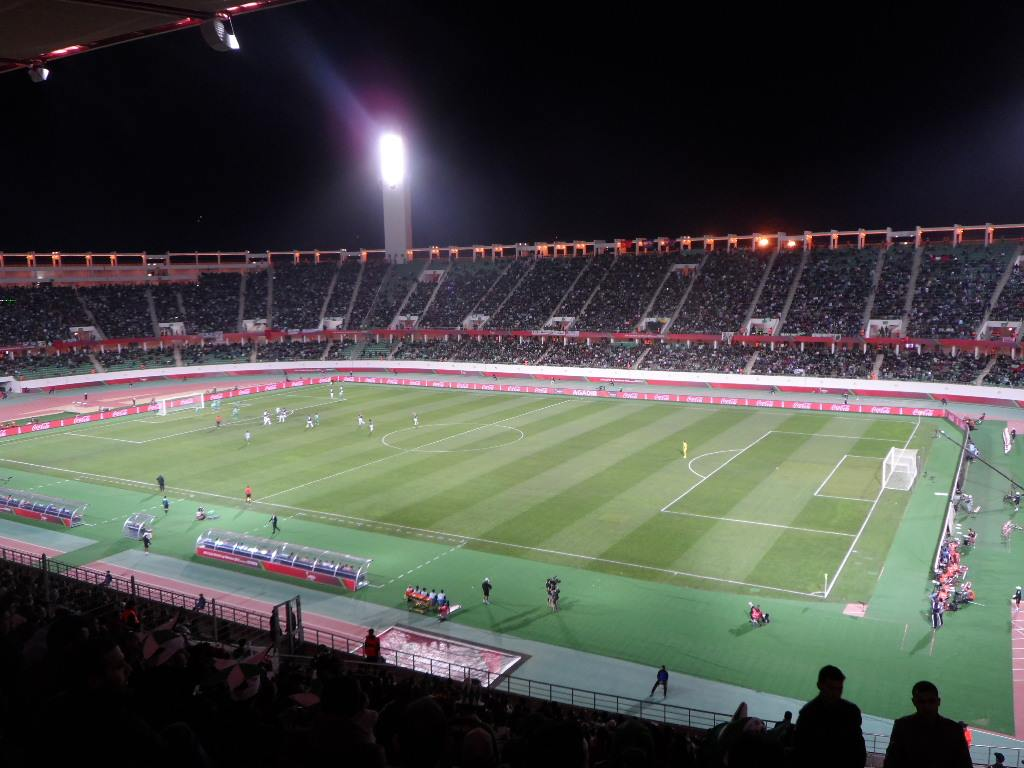
- Adrar Stadium during Club World Cup 2013

- Stade de Agadir, Souss-Massa, Morocco Stade de Agadir (Africa)
- Location: Hay Mohammadi; 80,000 Agadir; Souss-Massa; Morocco
- Owner: Ministry of Youth & Sports; Ministry of Equipment & Transport
- Operator: Sonarges
- Capacity: 45,480
- Surface: Grass; Classic Tartan track
- Field size: 105 by 84 metres (114.8 yd × 91.9 yd) (9,000 m²)

Construction
- Built: 4 June 2004; 2007; 2009
- Opened: October 11, 2013
- Renovated: 2023/25; 2026/28
- Cost: $103,000,000 (USD); DH 860 million (2013)
- Architects: Sad Benkirane; Gregotti Associati International

Tenants
- HUS Agadir (2013–present); Olympic Dcheira (2025–2026); Morocco national football team (selected matches)

Website
- sonarges.ma

Adrar Stadium (Arabic: ملعب آدرار; Tachelhit: ⴰⴱⴰⵔⴰⵣ ⵏ ⴰⴷⵔⴰⵔ (Adrar means mountain in Tachelhit); French: Grand Stade d'Agadir) is a multi-use stadium in Agadir, in the Souss-Massa region in the country of Morocco, near the Atlas Mountains, in North Africa, and is used as a home venue by the local football team, Hassania Agadir. It is also sometimes used for the Moroccan national team and for other FIFA and CAF international football matches as a neutral venue.

The construction project began on paper in 2003, with the idea of building the stadium for Morocco's failed 2006 FIFA World Cup bid. In 2007, the project resumed, but it was only completed in time for its inauguration in 2013, the 2013 FIFA Club World Cup that year. It has also hosted the 2018 African Nations Cup.

The Adrar Stadium, with a capacity of 45,480, the venue is mostly used for club football matches in the Botola Pro League, but it is also a host for occasional football matches for the Moroccan national team, a neutral venue for CAF friendlies and tournament qualifiers, and a music concert venue. As of 2024, renovations are under way to increase its capacity ahead of international football tournaments to be hosted by Morocco in 2025 and 2030.

== History ==
The stadium's first plan was to be a host venue as a part of Morocco's bid for the 2006 FIFA World Cup, which was instead awarded to Germany. Then, the project was put on hold and resumed in 2007 for Morocco's failed bid for the 2010 FIFA World Cup, when in 2010, South Africa was awarded the tournament as the host, and plans for the stadium were paused. The project was resumed in 2009 and finally completed on 11 October 2013. The inaugural match featured tenants Hassania Agadir—moving from the Stade Al Inbiaâte—in a friendly match against the Algerian side JS Kabylie. Hassania's Saad Lemti scored the first goal in the stadium in the 76th minute, the lone goal of the match. The Adrar stadium replaced their old venue, Stade Al Inbiaâte, as the home stadium of the local football club, Hassania Agadir.

=== Stadium details ===
The stadium's facade is covered in stone steps and evokes a stepped pyramid, and inside is the football field, surrounded by an athletics track. The original budget by 2013 was 860 million Moroccan Dirhams (MAD) ($103 million in USD) for the cost of construction, however, the final price of upgrading the stadium is higher at 1.008 bn MAD. The architects for the project were the firm Gregotti Associati International from Italy collaborating with the Moroccan architect Sâd Benkiran. On the site is a conference center, exhibition center, snack bar, and shops and restaurants. The stadium completed in 2013.

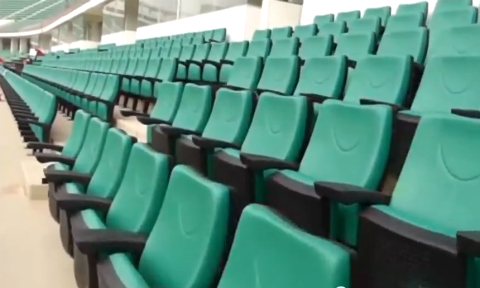
VIP seats in the Adrar stadium.

=== Expansion plans ===
A proposed two-phase expansion project, as part of a national investment in sporting infrastructure, was announced in 2024. Potentially, the plan is for the first phase to be completed for the 2025 Africa Cup of Nations to be held in Morocco, which will expand capacity by 14,144. Then, speculation is that the second phase is to begin after the Africa Cup of Nations and conclude in 2028, will increase football capacity to approximately 70,000 in time for the 2030 FIFA World Cup, which Morocco will co-host.

However, despite speculation, the only confirmed capacity for the stadium via FIFA is that the gross capacity will be 46,000, whilst the net capacity will be set at 42,800 for the 2030 World Cup.

== Club matches ==
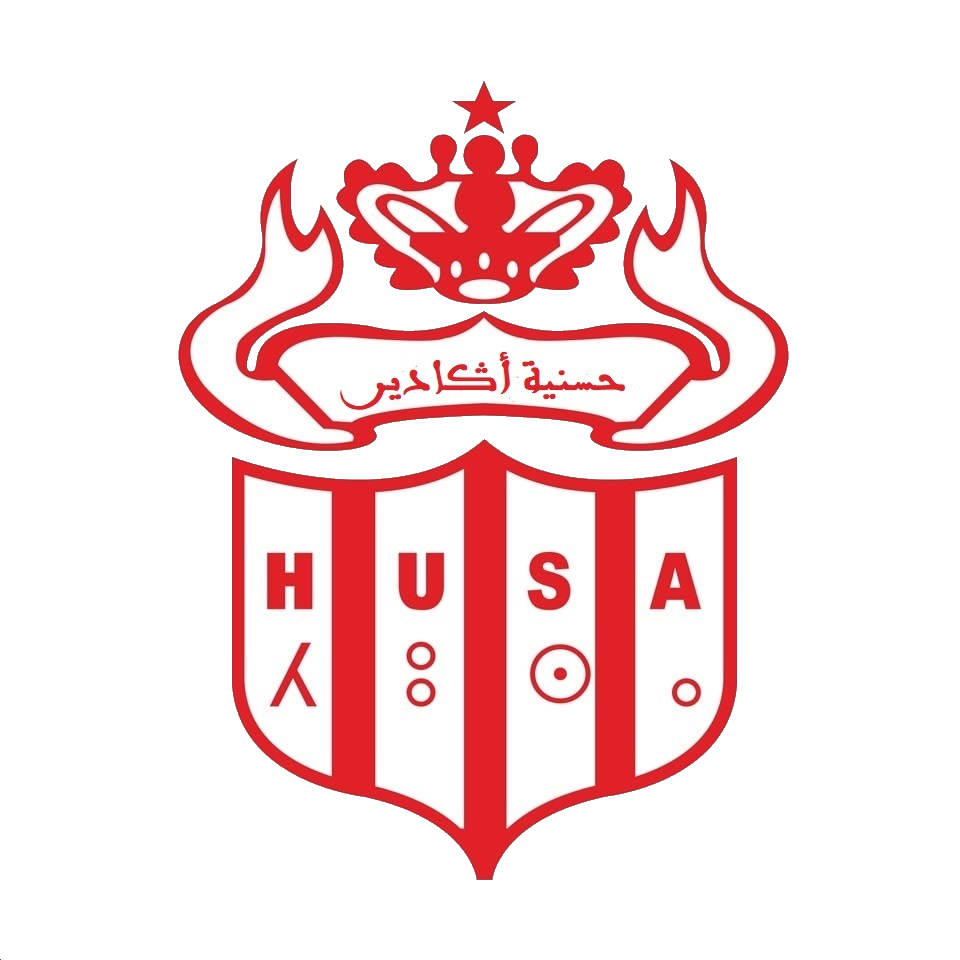
Hassania Agadir club logo

Adrar Stadium plays host to the Moroccan football club Hassania Agadir (French: Hassania Union Sport D'Agadir), who play locally in the city of Agadir. As of 2024, they are in the highest league in Morocco, the Botola Pro. The team saw some success in 2019, playing in the 2019 Moroccan Throne Cup final, but losing to Tihad AS of Casablanca. Hassania also qualified for the African continent in the CAF Confederation Cup, with games played in Adrar stadium. During the 2018-19 season, Hassania won games to qualify for the 2018–19 CAF Confederation Cup knockout stage, where they lost to the Egyptian team Zamalek SC in the quarter finals and were eliminated from the knockout stages of the Cup.

=== Covid-19 pandemic ===
Hassania Agadir qualified for the 2019–20 CAF Confederation Cup, where they progressed into the knockout stages again. However, the Royal Moroccan Football Federation made the decision to play the quarter final home match against Al-Nasr of Libya in Agadir behind closed doors, without any fans in attendance due to the restrictions imposed because of the COVID-19 pandemic. Hassania won the game, but then lost in the semi-final to fellow Moroccan team RS Berkane. The match had been delayed for five months because of the competition's postponement due to the pandemic.

== International matches ==
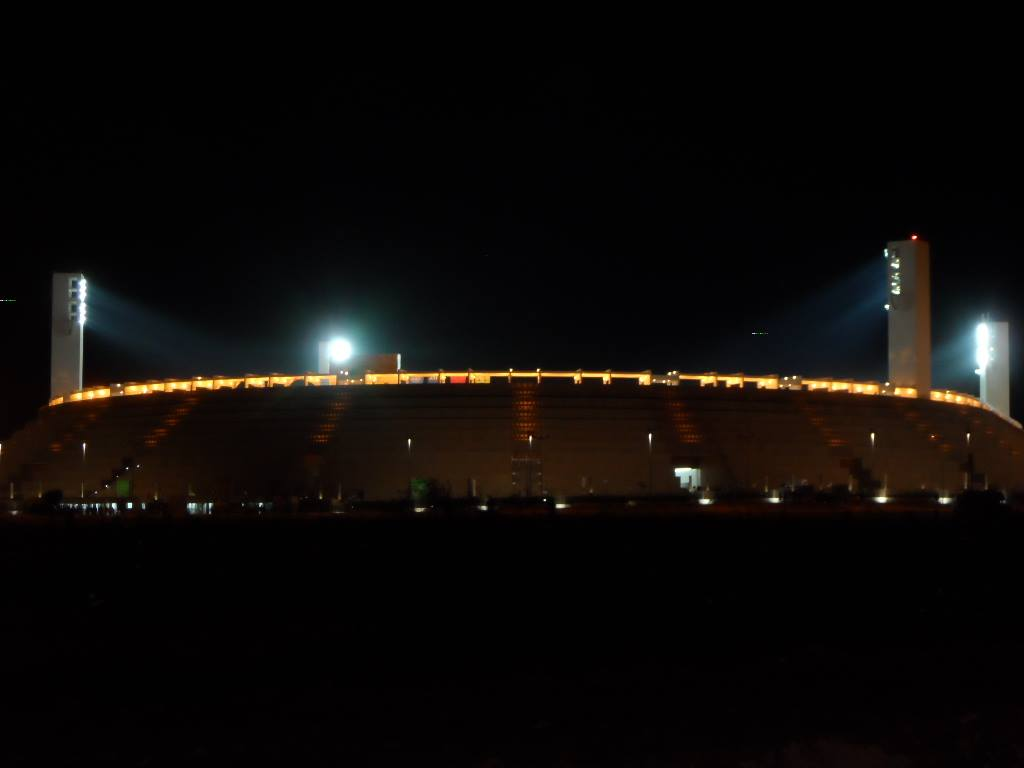
Adrar Stadium lit for night match.

Since its opening in 2013, Adrar Stadium has played host to numerous football matches for clubs and countries from around the world, including FIFA (Club World Cup) and CAF (African Nations Championship) tournament games. It will host more tournaments in the future. As well as Moroccan friendlies, qualification matches, and tournaments, Adrar stadium has also hosted other African nations, serving as a neutral venue for friendlies, and has had various African (CAF) teams play against each other in qualification matches for 2022 FIFA World Cup qualification (CAF), 2023 Africa Cup of Nations qualification and 2026 FIFA World Cup qualification (CAF). Though the Moroccan government decided to cancel hosting the 2015 Africa Cup of Nations due to fears of the Ebola outbreak, the Adrar stadium would have been used for the tournament. Instead, Equatorial Guinea was chosen as a replacement country to host the 2015 edition of AFCON.

Former Moroccan men's national team manager Ezzaki Badou has praised the stadium and its fans from the Sous area, also citing the moderate climate of Agadir as favorable for the players.

=== Morocco men's matches ===
Football matches played involving the Morocco men's national team at Adrar Stadium since its opening in 2013:

Date	Team #1	Result	Team #2	Match category
9 September 2024	Morocco	1–0	Lesotho	2025 Africa Cup of Nations qualification (Group B)
6 September 2024	Morocco	4–1	Gabon	2025 Africa Cup of Nations qualification (Group B)
11 June 2024	Morocco	6–0	(Republic of the Congo) Congo	2026 FIFA World Cup qualification (CAF Group E)
7 June 2024	Morocco	2–1	Zambia	2026 FIFA World Cup qualification (CAF Group E)
26 March 2024	Morocco	0–0	Mauritania	Friendly
22 March 2024	Morocco	1–0	Angola	Friendly
17 October 2023	Morocco	3–0	Liberia	2023 AFCON qualification (Group K)
31 May 2017	Morocco	1–2	Netherlands	Friendly
12 November 2015	Morocco	2–0	Equatorial Guinea	2018 FIFA World Cup qualification (CAF 2nd round)
12 October 2015	Morocco	1–1	Guinea	Friendly
9 October 2015	Morocco	0–1	Ivory Coast	Friendly
12 June 2015	Morocco	1–0	Libya	2017 AFCON qualification (Group F)
28 March 2015	Morocco	0–1	Uruguay	Friendly
16 November 2014	Morocco	2–1	Zimbabwe	Friendly
13 November 2014	Morocco	6–1	Benin	Friendly
11 October 2013	Morocco	1–1	South Africa	Friendly

=== CAF events ===
The Confederation of African Football (CAF) hosts matches in Agadir's Adrar stadium. The most recent tournament in Agadir was the 2018 African Nations Championship, a competition for men's football in Africa. The country is hosting the African Football Cup of Nations in 2025 for the first time in over 36 years since the 1988 African Cup of Nations. The Adrar stadium will again be a venue for some of the matches involving the 24 African teams, serving as one of the neutral venues in Morocco. Morocco also hosted the 2022 Women's Africa Cup of Nations; however, the Adrar stadium was not used for the competition. Instead Rabat and Casablanca were chosen as host cities.

==== 2018 African Nations Cup ====
Results of the football matches played in Agadir for the 2018 African Nations Cup men's tournament:

Date	Local time	Team #1	Result	Team #2	Round
23 January 2018	19:30	Equatorial Guinea	1–3	Nigeria	Group C
16 January 2018	16:30	Angola	0–0	Burkina Faso	Group D
16 January 2018	19:30	Cameroon	0–1	(Republic of the Congo) Congo	Group D
20 January 2018	16:30	Angola	1–0	Cameroon	Group D
20 January 2018	19:30	(Republic of the Congo) Congo	2–0	Burkina Faso	Group D
24 January 2018	19:00	(Republic of the Congo) Congo	0–0	Angola	Group D
28 January 2018	19:30	(Republic of the Congo) Congo	1–1 (a.e.t.) (3–5 p)	Libya	Quarter-finals

==== 2025 African Cup of Nations ====
Matches played in the Adrar Stadium for the 2025 African Cup of Nations:

Date	Local time	Team No. 1	Result	Team No. 2	Round
22 December 2025	20:00	Egypt	2–1	Zimbabwe	Group B
24 December 2025	20:00	Cameroon	1–0	Gabon	Group F
26 December 2025	18:00	Egypt	1–0	South Africa	Group B
29 December 2025	18:30	Angola	0–0	Egypt	Group B
31 December 2025	19:00	Mozambique	1–2	Cameroon	Group F
5 January 2026	18:00	Egypt	3–1 (a.e.t.)	Benin	Round of 16
10 January 2026	20:30	Egypt	3–2	Ivory Coast	Quarter-finals

=== FIFA events ===
The Adrar stadium has played host to numerous FIFA international football games on club and country levels. The FIFA Club World Cup tournament has been held in the city, and there is an open bid for Agadir to again become a host venue for the 2029 FIFA Club World Cup. The venue will also be a destination for co-hosting the FIFA World Cup in 2030, with Morocco becoming the second country in Africa to host the tournament after South Africa.

==== 2013 FIFA Club World Cup ====
Morocco was the destination for the 2013 FIFA Club World Cup as a replacement to the tournament being held in Japan for the then yearly continental competition. The reason for the change in the host country was because of the Japanese 2011 Tōhoku earthquake, which affected the country's infrastructure. The Moroccan bid was chosen as the first Club World Cup in Africa for 2013, with Agadir playing host to 4 games in the tournament. Then, in the following year, Morocco once again hosted the 2014 edition of the CWC, although Adrar was not chosen as a venue for any matches for the tournament's second edition in Morocco. For a third time, Morocco was chosen as the host country for the 2022 FIFA Club World Cup. However, Agadir was not chosen as a tournament venue; instead Rabat and Tangier were chosen for the matches of the tournament. The hosting of the tournaments in Morocco gave an incentive in 2022 for the government to expand its high-speed railway, Al Boraq, to finally connect Agadir to other cities.

Date	Local time	Team #1	Result	Team #2	Round	Attendance
11 December 2013	19:30	(Morocco) Raja Casablanca	2–1	(New Zealand) Auckland City	Play-off for QF	34,875
14 December 2013	16:00	(China) Guangzhou Evergrande	2–0	(Egypt) Al Ahly	Quarter-finals	34,579
14 December 2013	19:30	(Morocco) Raja Casablanca	2–1 a.e.t.	(Mexico) Monterrey	Quarter-finals	34,579
17 December 2013	19:30	(China) Guangzhou Evergrande	0–3	(Germany) Bayern Munich	Semi-finals	27,311

==== 2030 FIFA World Cup ====
In attempting to host the FIFA World Cup, Morocco had submitted the failed Morocco 2026 FIFA World Cup bid, with the Adrar stadium being instrumental in the application. However, USA-Canada-Mexico were instead chosen as co-hosts. Then, the Morocco–Portugal–Spain 2030 FIFA World Cup bid was chosen for the following World Cup four years later, with the Adrar stadium being scheduled to be used as part of Morocco's triple joint bid, along with Spain and Portugal. The bid was for the centenary anniversary of the FIFA World Cup. For 2030, FIFA decided on a new format to celebrate the "beautiful game", which sees three continents (Africa, Europe and South America) uniting to host the football (soccer) tournament. Therefore, as well as the triple bid around the Iberian Peninsula, the South American countries of Argentina, Uruguay, and Paraguay had also bid to host the cup, and were selected to host the opening group stage games of the 2030 World Cup, whilst the rest of the group stages and knockout stages of the tournament is being held in and around the Iberian peninsula of Spain, Portugal and Morocco. The decision to host three games outside of the triple bid involving Morocco was made in recognition of FIFA's inauguration for the first FIFA World Cup during 1930 in Uruguay, Latin America.
