= DR Congo national football team results (2020–present) =

This article provides details of international football games played by the DR Congo national football team from 2020 to present.

== Results ==
Key
Win
Draw
Defeat

=== 2020 ===
9 October 2020 Friendly	Burkina Faso	3–0	DR Congo	El Jadida, Morocco
17:00 UTC+1	B. Traoré 15'; Dabo 62' (pen.); Dayo 86'	Report		Stadium: Stade El Abdi; Referee: Redouane Jiyed (Morocco)

13 October 2020 Friendly	Morocco	1–1	DR Congo	Rabat, Morocco
19:00 UTC+1	Mazraoui 45'	Report	Wissa 60'	Stadium: Prince Moulay Abdellah Stadium; Referee: Alioune Sow Sandigui (Senegal)

14 November 2020 2021 AFCON qualification	DR Congo	0–0	Angola	Kinshasa, DR Congo
20:00 UTC+1		Report		Stadium: Stade des Martyrs; Referee: Sadok Selmi (Tunisia)

17 November 2020 2021 AFCON qualification	Angola	0–1	DR Congo	Luanda, Angola
17:00 UTC+1		Report	Kebano 64'	Stadium: Estádio 11 de Novembro; Referee: Victor Gomes (South Africa)

=== 2021 ===
17 January 2021 2020 CHAN GS	DR Congo	1–0	Congo	Douala, Cameroon
20:00 UTC+1	Kubanza 47'	Report		Stadium: Japoma Stadium; Referee: Samir Guezzaz (Morocco)

21 January 2021 2020 CHAN GS	Libya	1–1	DR Congo	Douala, Cameroon
17:00 UTC+1	Al-Mehdi 6'	Report	Obenza 90+4'	Stadium: Japoma Stadium; Referee: Boubou Traore (Mali)

25 January 2021 2020 CHAN GS	Niger	1–2	DR Congo	Yaoundé, Cameroon
20:00 UTC+1	Moussa 73'	Report	Kabangu 27'; Obenza 90+1'	Stadium: Stade Ahmadou Ahidjo; Referee: Lahlou Benbraham (Algeria)

30 January 2021 2020 CHAN QF	DR Congo	1–2	Cameroon	Douala, Cameroon
20:00 UTC+1	Lilepo 22'	Report	N'Djeng 29'; Felix Oukiné 42'	Stadium: Japoma Stadium; Referee: Mohamed Maarouf Eid Mansour (Egypt)

25 March 2021 2021 AFCON qualification	Gabon	3–0	DR Congo	Franceville, Gabon
17:00 UTC+1	Boupendza 44'; Bouanga 72'; Aubameyang 86'	Report		Stadium: Stade de Franceville; Referee: Janny Sikazwe (Zambia)

29 March 2021 2021 AFCON qualification	DR Congo	1–0	Gambia	Kinshasa, DR Congo
17:00 UTC+1	Kasengu 45+2' (pen.)	Report		Stadium: Stade des Martyrs; Referee: Amin Mohamed Omar (Egypt)

5 June 2021 Friendly	Tunisia	1–0	DR Congo	Radès, Tunisia
20:30 UTC+1	Sliti 45'	Report		Stadium: Stade Olympique de Radès; Attendance: 0 Referee: Mutaz Ibrahim (Libya)

11 June 2021 Friendly	DR Congo	1–1	Mali	Tunis, Tunisia
16:00 UTC+1	Malango 86'	Report	Coulibaly 4'	Stadium: Stade El Menzah; Attendance: 0

2 September 2021 2022 World Cup qualification	DR Congo	1–1	Tanzania	Lubumbashi, DR Congo
15:00 UTC+2	Mbokani 23'	Report	Msuva 36'	Stadium: Stade TP Mazembe; Referee: Kalilou Ibrahim Traore (Ivory Coast)

6 September 2021 2022 World Cup qualification	Benin	1–1	DR Congo	Cotonou, Benin
14:00 UTC+1	Adéoti 33'	Report	Mbokani 11'	Stadium: Stade de l'Amitié; Referee: Jean Ouattara (Burkina Faso)

7 October 2021 2022 World Cup qualification	DR Congo	2–0	Madagascar	Kinshasa, DR Congo
14:00 UTC+1	Akolo 35'; Mbokani 78' (pen.)	Report		Stadium: Stade des Martyrs; Attendance: 0 Referee: Antonio Caluassi Dungula (Angola)

10 October 2021 2022 World Cup qualification	Madagascar	1–0	DR Congo	Antananarivo, Madagascar
19:00 UTC+3	Rakotoharimalala 1'	Report		Stadium: Mahamasina Municipal Stadium; Attendance: 1,500; Referee: Patrice Milazare (Mauritius)

11 November 2021 2022 World Cup qualification	Tanzania	0–3	DR Congo	Dar es Salaam, Tanzania
16:00 UTC+3		Report	Kakuta 6'; Fasika 66'; Malango 85'	Stadium: National Stadium; Referee: Bernard Camille (Seychelles)

14 November 2021 2022 World Cup qualification	DR Congo	2–0	Benin	Kinshasa, DR Congo
14:00 UTC+1	Mbokani 10' (pen.); Malango 74'	Report		Stadium: Stade des Martyrs; Referee: Eric Otogo-Castane (Gabon)

=== 2022 ===
1 February 2022 Friendly	Bahrain	1–0	DR Congo	Riffa, Bahrain
19:00 UTC+4	Isa 48'	Report		Stadium: Bahrain National Stadium; Attendance: 50; Referee: Ahmed Eisa Darwish (United Arab Emirates)

25 March 2022 2022 World Cup qualification	DR Congo	1–1	Morocco	Kinshasa, DR Congo
16:00 UTC+1	Wissa 12'	Report	Tissoudali 76'	Stadium: Stade des Martyrs; Referee: Victor Gomes (South Africa)

29 March 2022 2022 World Cup qualification	Morocco	4–1 (5–2 agg.)	DR Congo	Casablanca, Morocco
20:30 UTC+1	Ounahi 21', 54'; Tissoudali 45+7'; Hakimi 69'	Report	Malango 77'	Stadium: Stade Mohammed V Referee: Pacifique Ndabihawenimana (Burundi)

4 June 2022 2023 AFCON qualification	DR Congo	0–1	Gabon	Kinshasa, DR Congo
17:00 UTC+1		Report	Babicka 23'	Stadium: Stade des Martyrs; Referee: Bernard Camille (Seychelles)

8 June 2022 2023 AFCON qualification	Sudan	2–1	DR Congo	Omdurman, Sudan
21:00 UTC+2	Bakhet 16'; Abdelrahman 86'	Report	Bolingi 90+3'	Stadium: Al Hilal Stadium; Referee: Joshua Bondo (Botswana)

23 September 2022 Friendly	DR Congo	0–1	Burkina Faso	Casablanca, Morocco
17:00 UTC+1		Report	B. Traoré 59'	Stadium: Stade Père Jégo; Referee: Samir Guezzaz (Morocco)

27 September 2022 Friendly	DR Congo	3–0	Sierra Leone	Casablanca, Morocco
17:00 UTC+1		Report		Stadium: Stade Père Jégo

=== 2023 ===
7 January 2023 Friendly	DR Congo	3–1	Libya	Tunis, Tunisia
15:00 UTC+1	Ma. Makkari 20' (o.g.); Makusu 74', 84' (pen.)	Report	Mo. Makari 24' (pen.)

10 January 2023 Friendly	DR Congo	0–1	Mali	Tunis, Tunisia
14:00 UTC+1		Report	Samabaly 19'

24 March 2023 2023 AFCON qualification	DR Congo	3–1	Mauritania	Lubumbashi, DR Congo
13:00 UTC+1	Kakuta 37'; Bakambu 42'; Masuaku 67'	Report	Abeid 55'	Stadium: Stade TP Mazembe; Referee: Abongile Tom (South Africa)

28 March 2023 2023 AFCON qualification	Mauritania	0–3 (awarded)	DR Congo	Nouakchott, Mauritania
22:00 UTC+0	Soueid 57'	Report	Bakambu 9'	Stadium: Stade Cheikha Ould Boïdiya; Referee: Sadok Selmi (Tunisia)

14 June 2023 Friendly	DR Congo	1–0	Uganda	Douala, Cameroon
16:00 UTC+1	Bongonda 26' (pen.)	Report		Stadium: Stade de Japoma; Referee: Florent Dimonya (Cameroon)

18 June 2023 2023 AFCON qualification	Gabon	0–2	DR Congo	Franceville, Gabon
19:00 UTC+1		Report	Tshibola 34'; Mayele 83'	Stadium: Stade de Franceville; Referee: Amin Omar (Egypt)

9 September 2023 2023 AFCON qualification	DR Congo	2–0	Sudan	Kinshasa, DR Congo
17:00 UTC+1	Bongonda 8'; Mayele 87'	Report		Stadium: Stade des Martyrs; Referee: Samir Guezzaz (Morocco)

12 September 2023 Friendly	South Africa	1–0	DR Congo	Johannesburg, South Africa
	Foster 25'	Report		Stadium: Orlando Stadium; Attendance: 9,140; Referee: Thulani Sibandze (Eswatini)

13 October 2023 Friendly	New Zealand	1–1	DR Congo	Murcia, Spain
	Wood 90+1' (pen.)	Report	Bakambu 46'	Stadium: Estadio Nueva Condomina

17 October 2023 Friendly	Angola	0–0	DR Congo	Lisbon, Portugal
		Report

15 November 2023 2026 World Cup qualification	DR Congo	2–0	Mauritania	Kinshasa, DR Congo
17:00 UTC+1	Wissa 62'; Bongonda 81'	Report		Stadium: Stade des Martyrs; Referee: Elmabrouk Muhammad (Libya)

19 November 2023 2026 World Cup qualification	Sudan	1–0	DR Congo	Benina, Libya
18:00 UTC+2	Pickel 79' (o.g.)	Report		Stadium: Martyrs of February Stadium; Attendance: 3,700; Referee: Bamlak Tessema Weyesa (Ethiopia)

=== 2024 ===
6 January 2024 Friendly	DR Congo	0–0	Angola	Dubai, United Arab Emirates
15:00 UTC+3		Report		Stadium: Shabab Al Ahli Stadium; Referee: Sultan Al–Hammadi (United Arab Emirates)

10 January 2024 Friendly	DR Congo	1–2	Burkina Faso	Abu Dhabi, United Arab Emirates
17:00 UTC+4	Mbemba 57'	Report	Touré 36'; Konaté 41'	Stadium: Baniyas Stadium; Attendance: 0 (Behind closed doors)

17 January 2024 2023 AFCON GS	DR Congo	1–1	Zambia	San-Pédro, Ivory Coast
20:00 UTC+0	Wissa 27'	Report	Kangwa 23'	Stadium: Laurent Pokou Stadium; Attendance: 15,478; Referee: Bamlak Tessema Weyesa (Ethiopia)

21 January 2024 2023 AFCON GS	Morocco	1–1	DR Congo	San-Pédro, Ivory Coast
14:00 UTC+0	Hakimi 6'	Report	Silas 76'	Stadium: Laurent Pokou Stadium; Attendance: 13,342; Referee: Peter Waweru (Kenya)

24 January 2024 2023 AFCON GS	Tanzania	0–0	DR Congo	Korhogo, Ivory Coast
20:00 UTC+0		Report		Stadium: Amadou Gon Coulibaly Stadium; Attendance: 12,847; Referee: Amin Omar (Egypt)

28 January 2024 2023 AFCON R16	Egypt	1–1 (a.e.t.) (7–8 p)	DR Congo	San-Pédro, Ivory Coast
20:00 UTC+0	Mohamed 45+1' (pen.)	Report	Elia 37'	Stadium: Laurent Pokou Stadium; Attendance: 12,342; Referee: Abongile Tom (South Africa)
	Penalties
	Abdelmonem (penalty scored); Mohamed (penalty missed); Marmoush (penalty scored); Kamal (penalty scored); Hany (penalty scored); Hegazi (penalty scored); Fathi (penalty scored); Hamada (penalty scored); Abou Gabal (penalty missed)		(penalty scored) Moutoussamy; (penalty missed) Masuaku; (penalty scored) Dianagana; (penalty scored) Silas; (penalty scored) Tshibola; (penalty scored) Kalulu; (penalty scored) Mbemba; (penalty scored) Inonga Baka; (penalty scored) Mpasi

2 February 2024 2023 AFCON QF	DR Congo	3–1	Guinea	Abidjan, Ivory Coast
20:00 UTC+0	Mbemba 27'; Wissa 65' (pen.); Masuaku 82'	Report	Bayo 21' (pen.)	Stadium: Alassane Ouattara Stadium; Attendance: 33,278; Referee: Mustapha Ghorbal (Algeria)

7 February 2024 2023 AFCON SF	Ivory Coast	1–0	DR Congo	Abidjan, Ivory Coast
20:00 UTC+0	Haller 65'	Report		Stadium: Alassane Ouattara Stadium; Attendance: 51,020; Referee: Mutaz Ibrahim (Libya)

10 February 2024 2023 AFCON 3rd	South Africa	0–0 (6–5 p)	DR Congo	Abidjan, Ivory Coast
20:00 UTC+0		Report		Stadium: Felix Houphouet Boigny Stadium; Attendance: 21,975; Referee: Bamlak Tessema Weyesa (Ethiopia)
	Penalties
	Mokoena (penalty missed); Sibisi (penalty scored); Monare (penalty scored); Modiba (penalty scored); Lepasa (penalty scored); Appollis (penalty scored); Xulu (penalty scored)		(penalty scored) Moutoussamy; (penalty scored) Mfulu; (penalty scored) Bakambu; (penalty scored) Kayembe; (penalty missed) Mbemba; (penalty scored) Wissa; (penalty missed) Elia

6 June 2024 2026 World Cup qualification	Senegal	1–1	DR Congo	Diamniadio, Senegal
19:00 UTC+0	I. Sarr 45+1'	Report	Mayele 85'	Stadium: Diamniadio Olympic Stadium; Referee: Mutaz Ibrahim (Libya)

9 June 2024 2026 World Cup qualification	DR Congo	1–0	Togo	Kinshasa, DR Congo
17:00 UTC+1	Elia 6'	Report		Stadium: Stade des Martyrs; Referee: Mehrez Malki (Tunisia)

6 September 2024 2025 AFCON qualification	DR Congo	1–0	Guinea	Kinshasa, DR Congo
17:00 UTC+1	Kayembe 27'	Report		Stadium: Stade des Martyrs; Referee: Mohamed Adel (Egypt)

9 September 2024 2025 AFCON qualification	Ethiopia	0–2	DR Congo	Dar es Salaam, Tanzania
22:00 UTC+3		Report	Bongonda 62'; Mayele 76'	Stadium: Benjamin Mkapa Stadium; Referee: Lahlou Benbraham (Algeria)

10 October 2024 2025 AFCON qualification	DR Congo	1–0	Tanzania	Kinshasa, DR Congo
--:--	Mzize 53' (o.g.)	Report		Stadium: Stade des Martyrs; Referee: Hillary Hambaba (Zambia)

15 October 2024 2025 AFCON qualification	Tanzania	0–2	DR Congo	Dar es Salaam, Tanzania
16:00 UTC+3		Report	Elia 87', 90+3'	Stadium: Benjamin Mkapa Stadium; Referee: Celso Alvação (Mozambique)

16 November 2024 2025 AFCON qualification	Guinea	1–0	DR Congo	Abidjan, Ivory Coast
18:00 UTC+0	Guirassy 90+2'	Report		Stadium: Alassane Ouattara Stadium

19 November 2024 2025 AFCON qualification	DR Congo	1–2	Ethiopia	Kinshasa, DR Congo
16:00 UTC+1	Batubinsika 90+2'	Report	Desta 36'; Nasir 90+6'	Stadium: Stade des Martyrs; Referee: Leonidas Lenine Da Graca (Cape Verde)

=== 2025 ===
21 March 2025 2026 World Cup qualification	DR Congo	1–0	South Sudan	Kinshasa, DR Congo
17:00 UTC+1	Bongonda 45+3'	Report		Stadium: Stade des Martyrs; Referee: Celso Alvação (Mozambique)

25 March 2025 2026 World Cup qualification	Mauritania	0–2	DR Congo	Nouadhibou, Mauritania
21:00 UTC+0		Report	Pickel 4'; Mayele 83'	Stadium: Nouadhibou Municipal Stadium; Referee: Mohamed Athoumani (Comoros)

5 June 2025 Friendly	DR Congo	1–0	Mali	Orléans, France
20:00	Essendee 27'	Report		Stadium: Stade de la Source

8 June 2025 Friendly	DR Congo	3–1	Madagascar	Orléans, France
20:00	Banza 28', 68'; Wissa 33'	Report	Raheriniaina 90+3'	Stadium: Stade de la Source

5 September 2025 2026 World Cup qualification	South Sudan	1–4	DR Congo	Juba, South Sudan
14:00 UTC+2	Majak 68'	Report	Bakambu 13', 36'; Mbuku 45+1'; Wissa 57'	Stadium: Juba Stadium; Referee: Brighton Chimene (Zimbabwe)

9 September 2025 2026 World Cup qualification	DR Congo	2–3	Senegal	Kinshasa, DR Congo
17:00 UTC+1	Bakambu 26'; Wissa 33'	Report	Gueye 39'; Jackson 53'; P. Sarr 87'	Stadium: Stade des Martyrs; Referee: Omar Artan (Somalia)

10 October 2025 2026 World Cup qualification	Togo	0–1	DR Congo	Lomé, Togo
14:00		Report	Bakambu 7'	Stadium: Stade de Kégué; Referee: Lenine Dos Santos Rocha (Cape Verde)

14 October 2025 2026 World Cup qualification	DR Congo	1–0	Sudan	Kinshasa, DR Congo
20:00	Bongonda 29'	Report		Stadium: Stade des Martyrs; Referee: Abongile Tom (South Africa)

13 November 2025 2026 World Cup qualification	Cameroon	0–1	DR Congo	Rabat, Morocco
20:00 UTC+1		Report	Mbemba 90+1'	Stadium: Al Barid Stadium; Attendance: 10,000; Referee: Mahmood Ismail (Sudan)

16 November 2025 2026 World Cup qualification	Nigeria	1–1 (a.e.t.) (3–4 p)	DR Congo	Rabat, Morocco
20:00 UTC+1	Onyeka 3'	Report	Elia 32'	Stadium: Moulay Hassan Stadium; Referee: Jalal Jayed (Morocco)
	Penalties
	Bassey (penalty missed); Simon (penalty missed); Adams (penalty scored); Onyemaechi (penalty scored); Ejuke (penalty scored); Ajayi (penalty missed)		(penalty missed) Moutoussamy; (penalty scored) Sadiki; (penalty missed) Tuanzebe; (penalty scored) Mayele; (penalty scored) Balikwisha; (penalty scored) Mbemba

16 December 2025 Friendly	Zambia	0–2	DR Congo	Murcia, Spain
16:00 UTC+1		Report	Masuaku 21'; Bushiri 72'	Stadium: Pinatar Arena; Referee: Javier Alberola Rojas (Spain)

23 December 2025 2025 AFCON GS	DR Congo	1–0	Benin	Rabat, Morocco
13:30 UTC+1	Bongonda 16'	Report		Stadium: Al Barid Stadium; Attendance: 13,073; Referee: Abongile Tom (South Africa)

27 December 2025 2025 AFCON GS	Senegal	1–1	DR Congo	Tangier, Morocco
16:00 UTC+1	Mané 69'	Report	Bakambu 61'	Stadium: Ibn Batouta Stadium; Attendance: 41,672; Referee: Lahlou Benbraham (Algeria)

30 December 2025 2025 AFCON GS	Botswana	0–3	DR Congo	Rabat, Morocco
20:00 UTC+1		Report	Mbuku 31'; Kakuta 41' (pen.), 60'	Stadium: Al Barid Stadium; Attendance: 12,569; Referee: Ahmad Heeralall (Mauritius)

=== 2026 ===
6 January 2026 2025 AFCON R16	Algeria	1–0 (a.e.t.)	DR Congo	Rabat, Morocco
17:00 UTC+1	Boulbina 119'	Report		Stadium: Moulay Hassan Stadium; Attendance: 18,837; Referee: Mahmoud Mansour (Egypt)

25 March 2026 Friendly	DR Congo	2–0	Bermuda	Guadalajara, Mexico
15:00 UTC−6	Mayele 45'; Wissa 51' (pen.)	Report		Stadium: Estadio Akron; Referee: Daniel Quintero (Mexico)

31 March 2026 2026 World Cup inter-confederation play-offs	DR Congo	1–0 (a.e.t.)	Jamaica	Guadalajara, Mexico
15:00 UTC−6	Tuanzebe 100'	Report		Stadium: Estadio Akron; Attendance: 39,983; Referee: Facundo Tello (Argentina)

3 June 2026 Friendly	Denmark	0–0	DR Congo	Liège, Belgium
19:00 UTC−2		Report		Stadium: Stade Maurice Dufrasne; Attendance: 23,043; Referee: Lothar D'Hondt (Belgium)

9 June 2026 Friendly	DR Congo	1–2	Chile	Orléans, France
18:00 UTC+2	Kayembe 88'	Report	Osorio 51'; Sepúlveda 86'	Stadium: Stade de la Source; Attendance: 0 (Behind closed doors); Referee: Mehrez Melki (Tunisia)
Note: Originally, Match cancelled due to La Línea de la Concepción's mayoral ban related to the 2026 Central Africa Ebola epidemic, but relocated to Orléans.

17 June 2026 2026 World Cup GS	Portugal	1–1	DR Congo	Houston, Texas, United States
12:00 UTC−5	J. Neves 6'	Report	Wissa 45+5'	Stadium: NRG Stadium; Attendance: 68,777; Referee: Abdulrahman Al-Jassim (Qatar)

23 June 2026 2026 World Cup GS	Colombia	1–0	DR Congo	Guadalajara, Mexico
20:00 UTC−6	Muñoz 76'	Report		Stadium: Estadio Akron; Attendance: 45,358; Referee: Maurizio Mariani (Italy)

27 June 2026 2026 World Cup GS	DR Congo	3–1	Uzbekistan	Atlanta, Georgia, United States
19:30 UTC−4	Wissa 68' (pen.), 90+1'; Mayele 78'	Report	Shomurodov 10'	Stadium: Mercedes-Benz Stadium; Attendance: 68,239; Referee: Felix Zwayer (Germany)

1 July 2026 2026 World Cup R32	England	2–1	DR Congo	Atlanta, Georgia, United States
12:00 UTC−4	Kane 75', 86'	Report	Cipenga 7'	Stadium: Mercedes-Benz Stadium; Attendance: 68,239; Referee: Adham Makhadmeh (Jordan)

== Forthcoming fixtures ==
The following matches are scheduled:

TBD 2027 AFCON qualification	DR Congo	v	Equatorial Guinea	TBD, DR Congo
TBD				Stadium: TBD

TBD 2027 AFCON qualification	Equatorial Guinea	v	DR Congo	TBD, Equatorial Guinea
TBD				Stadium: Estadio de Malabo

TBD 2027 AFCON qualification	DR Congo	v	Sierra Leone	TBD, DR Congo
TBD				Stadium: TBD

TBD 2027 AFCON qualification	Sierra Leone	v	DR Congo	El Jadida, Morocco
TBD				Stadium: TBD

TBD 2027 AFCON qualification	DR Congo	v	Zimbabwe	Kinshasa, DR Congo
TBD				Stadium: Stade des Martyrs

TBD 2027 AFCON qualification	Zimbabwe	v	DR Congo	TBD, Zimbabwe
TBD				Stadium: TBD
