= 2023 Africa Cup of Nations Group F =

Football tournament group stage

Group F of the 2023 Africa Cup of Nations took place from 17 to 24 January 2024. The group consisted of Morocco, DR Congo, Zambia, and Tanzania.

Morocco and DR Congo as the top two teams advanced to the round of 16.

== Teams ==
Draw position	Team	Zone	Method of qualification	Date of qualification	Finals appearance	Last appearance	Previous best performance	FIFA Rankings	
Draw position	Team	Zone	Method of qualification	Date of qualification	Finals appearance	Last appearance	Previous best performance	October 2023 (Note: The rankings of October 2023 were used for seeding for the final draw.)	December 2023
F1	Morocco	UNAF	Group K winners	28 March 2023	19th	2021	Winners (1976)	13	13
F2	DR Congo	UNIFFAC	Group I winners	9 September 2023	20th	2019	Winners (1968, 1974)	64	67
F3	Zambia	COSAFA	Group H winners	17 June 2023	18th	2015	Winners (2012)	82	84
F4	Tanzania	CECAFA	Group F runners-up	7 September 2023	4th	2019	Group stage (1980, 2019)	122	121

== Standings ==
Pos	Team	Pld	W	D	L	GF	GA	GD	Pts	Qualification
1	Morocco	3	2	1	0	5	1	+4	7	Advance to knockout stage
2	DR Congo	3	0	3	0	2	2	0	3	Advance to knockout stage
3	Zambia	3	0	2	1	2	3	−1	2 (Note: Tied on head-to-head points. Overall goal difference: Zambia −1, Tanzania −3.)	
4	Tanzania	3	0	2	1	1	4	−3	2	

Source: CAF
Rules for classification: Group stage tiebreakers

== Matches ==
All times are local, GMT (UTC±0).

=== Morocco vs Tanzania ===
Morocco and Tanzania met for the sixth time, with the previous five being qualification matches for both the Africa Cup of Nations and the World Cup. The first meeting occurred on 9 October 2010, with Morocco winning 1–0 in Dar es Salaam, Tanzania, and would win again exactly one year later on 9 October 2011, a 3–1 victory in Marrakech which secured Morocco's qualification for the 2012 Africa Cup of Nations. The nation split the two meetings during qualification for the 2014 FIFA World Cup, with Tanzania pulling off a 3–1 victory in Dar es Salaam on 24 March 2013, before Morocco won 2–1 in Marrakech on 8 June 2013. Ultimately, neither nation qualified for the tournament. The most recent meeting occurred on 21 November 2023, with Morocco winning 2–0 in Dar es Salaam to start off its road to qualification for the 2026 FIFA World Cup.

For the first 30 minutes Morocco struggled to break down a cohesive Tanzanian side, however, Hakim Ziyech finally struck a fierce free kick that was parried by Aishi Manula and fell for Romain Saïss to score the opener. Morocco struggled to break through the Tanzanian defence again until Novatus Dismas got dismissed in the 70th minute after a foul on Azzedine Ounahi. Ounahi then struck the second seven minutes later, before Youssef En-Nesyri secured Morocco's win just three minutes later from a clinical Achraf Hakimi pass.

17 January 2024
17:00

Morocco	3–0	Tanzania
Saïss 30'; Ounahi 77'; En-Nesyri 80'	Report

Laurent Pokou Stadium, San-Pédro
Attendance: 15,478
Referee: Alhadj Allaou Mahamat (Chad)

Morocco	Tanzania

GK	1	Yassine Bounou
RB	2	Achraf Hakimi
CB	5	Nayef Aguerd
CB	6	Romain Saïss (c)	(yellow card) 52'
LB	27	Mohamed Chibi	(yellow card) 61'
CM	4	Sofyan Amrabat
CM	15	Selim Amallah		(substituted off) 72'
RW	7	Hakim Ziyech		(substituted off) 81'
AM	8	Azzedine Ounahi		(substituted off) 81'
LW	16	Abdessamad Ezzalzouli		(substituted off) 71'
CF	19	Youssef En-Nesyri		(substituted off) 81'
Substitutions:
FW	21	Amine Adli		(substituted on) 71'
MF	23	Bilal El Khannous		(substituted on) 72'
FW	20	Ayoub El Kaabi		(substituted on) 81'
FW	17	Sofiane Boufal		(substituted on) 81'
MF	10	Amine Harit		(substituted on) 81'
Manager:
Walid Regragui

GK	18	Aishi Manula
RB	2	Haji Mnoga
CB	14	Bakari Mwamnyeto
CB	4	Ibrahim Hamad
LB	15	Mohammed Husseini	(yellow card) 90+6'
CM	3	Mudathir Yahya		(substituted off) 46'
CM	7	Himid Mao	(yellow card) 22'
CM	20	Novatus Dismas	(yellow card) 31' (yellow-red card) 70'
RW	10	Mbwana Samatta		(substituted off) 69'
CF	21	Charles M'Mombwa	(yellow card) 61'
LW	11	Tarryn Allarakhia		(substituted off) 38'
Substitutions:
FW	12	Simon Msuva		(substituted on) 38'
MF	8	Morice Abraham		(substituted on) 46'
MF	6	Feisal Salum		(substituted on) 69'
Manager:
(Algeria) Adel Amrouche

Man of the Match:
Azzedine Ounahi (Morocco)

Assistant referees:
Jerson dos Santos (Angola)
Seydou Tiama (Burkina Faso)
Fourth official:
Boubou Traoré (Mali)
Video assistant referee:
Mohamed Ashour (Egypt)
Assistant video assistant referee:
Maria Rivet (Mauritius)

=== DR Congo vs Zambia ===
DR Congo and Zambia met for the 14th time, with the previous notable meetings including matches during qualification for the 1972 Africa Cup of Nations, the 1998 World Cup, and the 2000 Africa Cup of Nations. Some of the meetings include matches that DR Congo played as Zaire, and the 2–2 draw on 9 April 1997 was notable because it would be the penultimate match Zaire played before being renamed to DR Congo. Both nations also finished in the top two of the qualification group for the 2000 Africa Cup of Nations to advance.

The match started brightly for the Congolese, but despite their domination, it was Zambia who struck first when a throw-in from Patson Daka fell to Kings Kangwa after clumsy efforts to clear by the DRC players. Nonetheless, DR Congo equalised just four minutes later when Cédric Bakambu unleashed his speed to overcome the Zambian defense before sending the ball through to Yoane Wissa to score. The final result was a 1–1 draw, the same as their previous competitive meeting in the 2015 AFCON.

This also meant Zambia had not won a competitive AFCON match since 2012, when they had been crowned champions.

17 January 2024
20:00

DR Congo	1–1	Zambia
Wissa 27'	Report	Kangwa 23'

Laurent Pokou Stadium, San-Pédro
Attendance: 15,478
Referee: Bamlak Tessema Weyesa (Ethiopia)

DR Congo	Zambia

GK	1	Lionel Mpasi
RB	24	Gédéon Kalulu	(yellow card) 90'
CB	22	Chancel Mbemba (c)
CB	2	Henoc Inonga Baka
LB	26	Arthur Masuaku
DM	8	Samuel Moutoussamy
RM	10	Théo Bongonda
CM	14	Gaël Kakuta		(substituted off) 71'
CM	18	Charles Pickel
LM	20	Yoane Wissa		(substituted off) 90+3'
CF	17	Cédric Bakambu		(substituted off) 82'
Substitutions:
FW	13	Meschak Elia		(substituted on) 71'
FW	23	Simon Banza		(substituted on) 82'
FW	11	Silas		(substituted on) 90+3'
Manager:
(France) Sébastien Desabre

GK	16	Lawrence Mulenga
RB	26	Tandi Mwape
CB	13	Stoppila Sunzu
CB	4	Frankie Musonda
LB	23	Rodrick Kabwe
DM	15	Kelvin Kapumbu
RM	8	Lubambo Musonda		(substituted off) 76'
CM	22	Kings Kangwa		(substituted off) 90+4'
CM	12	Emmanuel Banda	(yellow card) 55'
LM	10	Fashion Sakala
CF	20	Patson Daka
Substitutions:
FW	9	Lameck Banda		(substituted on) 76'
MF	11	Larry Bwalya		(substituted on) 90+4'
Manager:
(Israel) Avram Grant

Man of the Match:
Yoane Wissa (DR Congo)

Assistant referees:
Liban Abdourazak (Djibouti)
Nouho Ouattara (Ivory Coast)
Fourth official:
Pacifique Ndabihawenimana (Burundi)
Video assistant referee:
Dahane Beida (Mauritania)
Assistant video assistant referee:
Akhona Makalima (South Africa)

=== Morocco vs DR Congo ===
Morocco and DR Congo met for the sixth time in the 21st century, and the first time since the 2017 Africa Cup of Nations, where DR Congo won 1–0. However, their most recent meetings was at the 2022 FIFA World Cup qualification, in which Morocco advanced to the final tournament after winning 5–2 on aggregate.

The match started well for the Moroccans when a corner by Hakim Ziyech, was volleyed in by Achraf Hakimi to give Morocco the lead in the sixth minute. However, the Congolese ramped up pressure later on despite Moroccan domination. They got a penalty from Selim Amallah's handball in the 36th minute, but Cédric Bakambu wasted this golden opportunity by putting his penalty wide. However, as the Moroccans started losing momentum in the second half, they were made to pay in the 76th minute when Meschak Elia's low cross was met by Silas to hit the equalizer.

21 January 2024
14:00

Morocco	1–1	DR Congo
Hakimi 6'	Report	Silas 76'

Laurent Pokou Stadium, San-Pédro
Attendance: 13,342
Referee: Peter Waweru (Kenya)

Morocco	DR Congo

GK	1	Yassine Bounou
RB	2	Achraf Hakimi
CB	5	Nayef Aguerd
CB	6	Romain Saïss (c)
LB	27	Mohamed Chibi
DM	4	Sofyan Amrabat
RM	7	Hakim Ziyech	(yellow card) 44'	(substituted off) 73'
CM	8	Azzedine Ounahi		(substituted off) 80'
CM	15	Selim Amallah	(yellow card) 40'	(substituted off) 64'
LW	17	Sofiane Boufal		(substituted off) 64'
CF	19	Youssef En-Nesyri		(substituted off) 80'
Substitutions:
FW	16	Abde Ezzalzouli		(substituted on) 64'
MF	23	Bilal El Khannous		(substituted on) 64'
FW	21	Amine Adli	(yellow card) 87'	(substituted on) 73'
FW	20	Ayoub El Kaabi		(substituted on) 80'
MF	10	Amine Harit		(substituted on) 80'
Manager:
Walid Regragui

GK	1	Lionel Mpasi
RB	24	Gédéon Kalulu
CB	22	Chancel Mbemba (c)	(yellow card) 90+8'
CB	2	Henoc Inonga Baka		(substituted off) 46'
LB	26	Arthur Masuaku
DM	8	Samuel Moutoussamy
RM	10	Théo Bongonda		(substituted off) 52'
CM	14	Gaël Kakuta		(substituted off) 64'
CM	18	Charles Pickel		(substituted off) 89'
LM	20	Yoane Wissa
CF	17	Cédric Bakambu		(substituted off) 52'
Substitutions:
DF	5	Dylan Batubinsika		(substituted on) 46'
FW	13	Meschak Elia		(substituted on) 52'
FW	19	Fiston Mayele		(substituted on) 52'
FW	11	Silas		(substituted on) 64'
MF	6	Aaron Tshibola		(substituted on) 89'
Manager:
(France) Sébastien Desabre

Man of the Match:
Silas (DR Congo)

Assistant referees:
Gilbert Cheruiyot (Kenya)
Stephen Yiembe (Kenya)
Fourth official:
Ahmed Heerallal (Mauritius)
Video assistant referee:
Akhona Makalima (South Africa)
Assistant video assistant referee:
Mohamed Adel (Egypt)

=== Zambia vs Tanzania ===
This was the teams’ first meeting at an AFCON tournament, with their most recent competitive meeting being in the 2020 African Nations Championship.

In the 11th minute Simon Msuva capitalised from teammate Mbwana Samatta's wicked cross to give Tanzania the lead, and things appeared to get even better for the Tanzanians when Zambia's captain Rodrick Kabwe committed a brutal foul against Samatta in the midfield at the 44th minute, resulting in his dismissal after two yellow cards. However, Tanzania failed to capitalise from that advantage and they were undone in the 88th minute when Patson Daka, from Clatous Chama's corner, struck late with a header to kill off Tanzania's hopes for a maiden AFCON victory.

21 January 2024
17:00

Zambia	1–1	Tanzania
Daka 88'	Report	Msuva 11'

Laurent Pokou Stadium, San-Pédro
Attendance: 13,342
Referee: Djindo Louis Houngnandande (Benin)

Zambia	Tanzania

GK	16	Lawrence Mulenga
RB	3	Benedict Chepeshi		(substituted off) 87'
CB	13	Stoppila Sunzu
CB	4	Frankie Musonda
LB	23	Rodrick Kabwe (c)	(yellow card) 33' (yellow-red card) 44'
RM	10	Fashion Sakala		(substituted off) 76'
CM	22	Kings Kangwa		(substituted off) 76'
CM	15	Kelvin Kapumbu		(substituted off) 46'
CM	12	Emmanuel Banda
LM	9	Lameck Banda	(yellow card) 45'	(substituted off) 86'
CF	20	Patson Daka
Substitutions:
MF	8	Lubambo Musonda		(substituted on) 46'
FW	25	Kennedy Musonda		(substituted on) 76'
MF	17	Clatous Chama		(substituted on) 76'
MF	14	Edward Chilufya		(substituted on) 86'
DF	5	Miguel Chaiwa		(substituted on) 87'
Manager:
(Israel) Avram Grant

GK	18	Aishi Manula
RB	2	Haji Mnoga	(substituted off) 46'
CB	14	Bakari Mwamnyeto
CB	4	Ibrahim Hamad
LB	15	Mohamed Husseini
CM	7	Himid Mao	(substituted off) 70'
CM	19	Mzamiru Yassin
RW	12	Simon Msuva
AM	6	Feisal Salum	(substituted off) 59'
LW	22	Kibu Denis	(substituted off) 70'
CF	10	Mbwana Samatta (c)
Substitutions:
DF	16	Lusajo Mwaikenda	(substituted on) 46'
MF	8	Morice Abraham	(substituted on) 59'
FW	21	Charles M'Mombwa	(substituted on) 70'
MF	3	Mudathir Yahya	(substituted on) 70'
Manager:
(Algeria) Adel Amrouche

Man of the Match:
Patson Daka (Zambia)

Assistant referees:
Eric Ayimavo (Benin)
Modibo Samake (Mali)
Fourth official:
Boubou Traoré (Mali)
Video assistant referee:
Dahane Beida (Mauritania)
Assistant video assistant referee:
Issa Sy (Senegal)

=== Tanzania vs DR Congo ===
It was the two countries' first ever AFCON meeting.

In a match mostly dominated by dull displays from both sides, Gaël Kakuta tried his luck with a set-piece, while Feisal Salum and Mbwana Samatta attempted to get to the scoresheet to no avail. Other attempts by Fiston Mayele and Simon Msuva also didn't produce results, as Tanzania and DR Congo were forced to settle for a draw.

The draw meant that Tanzania failed to register a single win in all three AFCON tournaments in which they had played, while DR Congo unimpressively advanced to the knockout stage to face Egypt, who had, like the Congolese, progressed despite remaining winless in their group.

24 January 2024
20:00

Tanzania	0–0	DR Congo
	Report

Amadou Gon Coulibaly Stadium, Korhogo
Attendance: 12,847
Referee: Amin Omar (Egypt)

Tanzania	DR Congo

GK	18	Aishi Manula
RB	16	Lusajo Mwaikenda
CB	14	Bakari Mwamnyeto
CB	4	Ibrahim Hamad
LB	15	Mohammed Husseini
DM	20	Novatus Dismas
RM	2	Haji Mnoga
CM	7	Himid Mao	(substituted off) 71'
CM	6	Feisal Salum	(substituted off) 79'
LM	12	Simon Msuva	(substituted off) 86'
CF	10	Mbwana Samatta (c)	(substituted off) 86'
Substitutions:
MF	19	Mzamiru Yassin	(substituted on) 71'
FW	22	Kibu Denis	(substituted on) 79'
MF	8	Morice Abraham	(substituted on) 86'
MF	21	Charles M'Mombwa	(substituted on) 86'
Manager:
Hemed Suleiman Ali (Note: Tanzania manager Adel Amrouche was suspended for eight matches due to his offensive comments. Assistant manager Hemed Suleiman Ali filled in as manager.)

GK	1	Lionel Mpasi
RB	24	Gédéon Kalulu
CB	22	Chancel Mbemba (c)
CB	5	Dylan Batubinsika
LB	26	Arthur Masuaku
CM	18	Charles Pickel	(yellow card) 9'	(substituted off) 68'
CM	8	Samuel Moutoussamy
RW	11	Silas		(substituted off) 53'
AM	14	Gaël Kakuta		(substituted off) 87'
LW	20	Yoane Wissa
CF	19	Fiston Mayele		(substituted off) 68'
Substitutions:
MF	13	Meschak Elia		(substituted on) 53'
MF	6	Aaron Tshibola		(substituted on) 68'
FW	17	Cédric Bakambu		(substituted on) 68'
MF	25	Omenuke Mfulu		(substituted on) 87'
Manager:
(France) Sébastien Desabre

Man of the Match:
Gaël Kakuta (DR Congo)

Assistant referees:
Attia Amsaaed Attia (Libya)
Khalil Hassani (Tunisia)
Fourth official:
Mahmoud El-Banna (Egypt)
Video assistant referee:
Mahmoud Ashour (Egypt)
Assistant video assistant referee:
Mohamed Adel (Egypt)

=== Zambia vs Morocco ===
The two teams had never met at an AFCON tournament, with the most recent competitive meeting coming in the 2020 African Nations Championship, where Morocco had eliminated Zambia 3–1 in the knockout stage.

A draw would have sufficed for Zambia to have progressed ahead of Ivory Coast as one of the top four third-placed teams, but Hakim Ziyech scored the only goal to eliminate Zambia from the tournament.

24 January 2024
20:00

Zambia	0–1	Morocco
	Report	Ziyech 37'

Laurent Pokou Stadium, San-Pédro
Attendance: 15,231
Referee: Patrice Tanguy (Gabon)

Zambia	Morocco

GK	16	Lawrence Mulenga
RB	26	Tandi Mwape	(substituted off) 83'
CB	13	Stoppila Sunzu
CB	4	Frankie Musonda
LB	8	Lubambo Musonda (c)
CM	5	Fashion Sakala
CM	12	Emmanuel Banda
RW	14	Edward Chilufya	(substituted off) 71'
AM	25	Kennedy Musonda	(substituted off) 71'
LW	9	Lameck Banda
CF	20	Patson Daka
Substitutions:
MF	22	Kings Kangwa	(substituted on) 71'
FW	10	Fashion Sakala	(substituted on) 71'
MF	17	Clatous Chama	(substituted on) 83'
Manager:
(Israel) Avram Grant

GK	1	Yassine Bounou
RB	2	Achraf Hakimi	(yellow card) 81'
CB	5	Nayef Aguerd
CB	13	Yunis Abdelhamid
LB	25	Yahia Attiyat Allah
DM	4	Sofyan Amrabat
RM	7	Hakim Ziyech (c)		(substituted off) 45'
CM	8	Azzedine Ounahi		(substituted off) 84'
CM	11	Ismael Saibari		(substituted off) 68'
LM	17	Sofiane Boufal		(substituted off) 68'
CF	20	Ayoub El Kaabi		(substituted off) 73'
Substitutions:
FW	21	Amine Adli		(substituted on) 45'
MF	24	Amir Richardson		(substituted on) 68'
FW	16	Abde Ezzalzouli		(substituted on) 68'
FW	9	Tarik Tissoudali		(substituted on) 73'
MF	23	Bilal El Khannous		(substituted on) 84'
Manager:
Walid Regragui

Man of the Match:
Sofyan Amrabat (Morocco)

Assistant referees:
Dimbiniaina Andriatianarivelo (Madagascar)
Koffi Ahonto (Togo)
Fourth official:
Abdel Aziz Bouh (Mauritania)
Video assistant referee:
Abongile Tom (South Africa)
Assistant video assistant referee:
Carine Atezambong (Cameroon)

== Discipline ==
Fair play points would have been used as tiebreakers if the overall and head-to-head records of teams were tied. These were calculated based on yellow and red cards received in all group matches as follows:

Only one of the above deductions was applied to a player in a single match.

Team	Match 1				Match 2				Match 3				Points
Team	Booked	(yellow card) (yellow-red card)	Sent off (straight red)	(yellow card) (red card)	Booked	(yellow card) (yellow-red card)	Sent off (straight red)	(yellow card) (red card)	Booked	(yellow card) (yellow-red card)	Sent off (straight red)	(yellow card) (red card)	Points
Morocco	2				3				1				–6
DR Congo	1				1				1				–3
Zambia	1				1	1							–5
Tanzania	3	1											–6
