= Patson Daka =

Zambian footballer (born 1998)

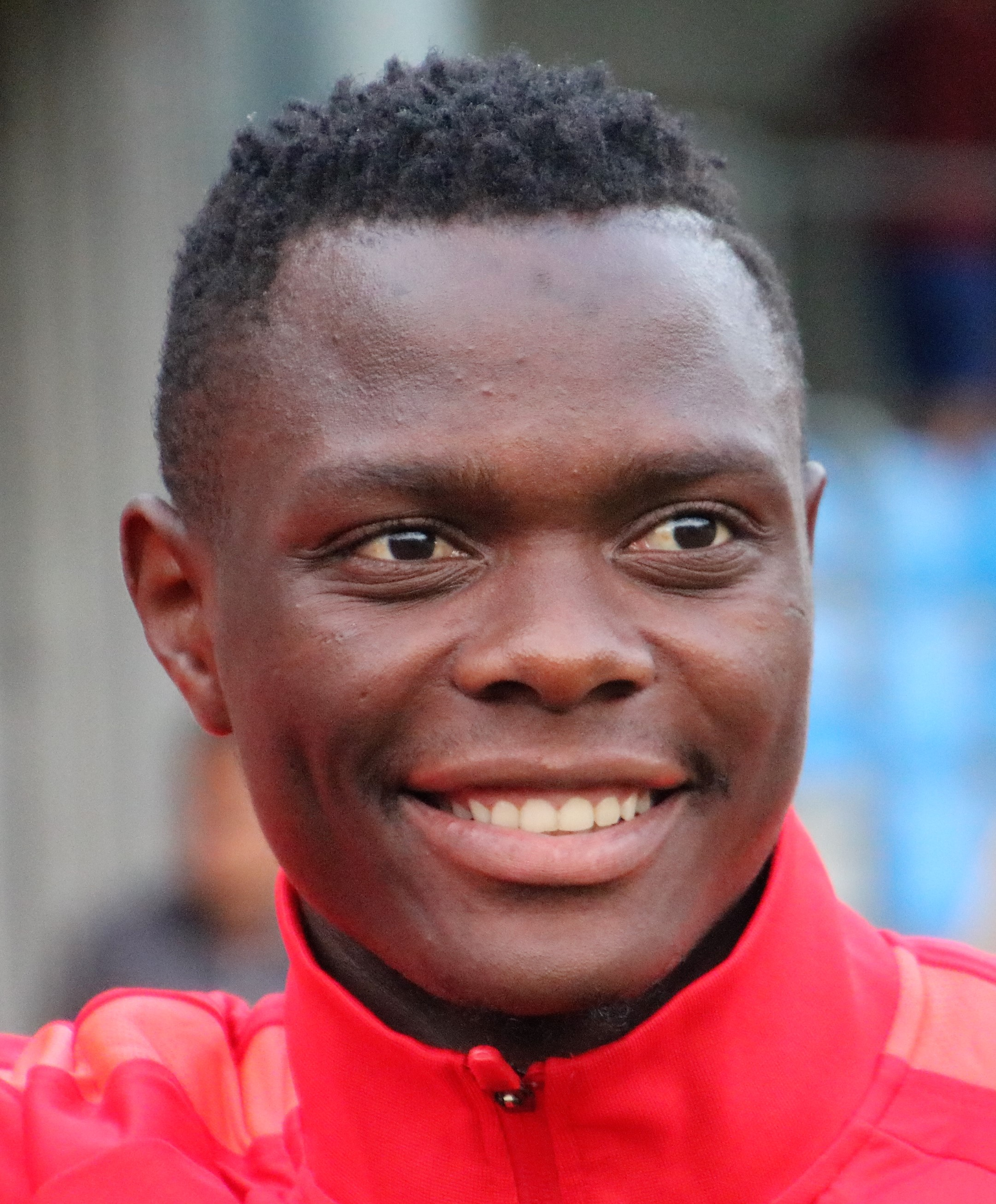
- Daka with Red Bull Salzburg in 2019

Personal information
- Full name: Patson Daka
- Date of birth: 9 October 1998 (age 28)
- Place of birth: Chingola, Zambia
- Height: 1.83 m (6 ft 0 in)
- Position: Striker

Team information
- Current team: Hamburger SV
- Number: 27

Youth career
- 2007–2014: Kafue Celtic

Senior career*
Years	Team	Apps	(Gls)
2014–2017	Kafue Celtic		
2014–2015	→ Nchanga Rangers (loan)		
2015–2016	→ Power Dynamos (loan)		
2017–2018	FC Liefering	27	(6)
2017–2021	Red Bull Salzburg	82	(54)
2021–2026	Leicester City	137	(22)
2026–	Hamburger SV	6	(0)

International career^{‡}
2014–2015	Zambia U17	7	(7)
2015–2017	Zambia U20	13	(6)
2015–	Zambia	57	(22)
Medal record
Men's football
Representing Zambia
COSAFA U-20 Cup
Winner	2016	U-20 Team
Africa U-20 Cup of Nations
Winner	2017	U-20 Team
- * Club domestic league appearances and goals as of 11:55, 20 November 2026 (UTC) ‡ National team caps and goals as of 09:35, 1 April 2026 (UTC)

Patson Daka (born 9 October 1998) is a Zambian professional footballer who plays as a striker for Bundesliga club Hamburger SV and the Zambia national team.

Daka's career trajectory began within the youth system, where he showcased his abilities playing for local club Kafue Celtic. Subsequently, he was sent on loan to Nchanga Rangers and Power Dynamos, where he was able to further hone his skills. In January 2017, Daka joined Red Bull Salzburg's reserve team FC Liefering in Austria, and was then made part of the first team in the following summer. He helped Salzburg win four Austrian Bundesliga titles and three Austrian Cups. In summer 2021, Daka joined Leicester City in the Premier League.

Daka made his senior international debut for Zambia in 2015 at the age of 16.

== Club career ==
=== Early career ===
Daka began his youth career at Kafue Celtic, joining their under-12s, before moving on to the under-14s in 2007, and to the under-17s in 2010.

In summer 2014, Daka was sent on a one-year loan to Nchanga Rangers in the Zambia Super League. He was then loaned out to Power Dynamos in summer 2015. Before that, he did some practice sessions with Lille but finally didn't sign with the French side. At Dynamos, he ended the season as the club's top scorer with 12 goals.

At the end of the 2016 season, he was awarded as the Zambia Super League Young Player of the Year.

=== FC Liefering ===
Daka moved to Austria in January 2016 when he signed with FC Liefering – the second-tier feeder team of Red Bull Salzburg – on a half-season loan from Kafue Celtic. Daka scored twice for the club in nine appearances to help them finish second in the 2.Liga.

=== Red Bull Salzburg ===
Daka signed with Red Bull Salzburg in 2017. He helped the club win the UEFA Youth League, scoring two goals in two games. On 27 November, Daka scored against Genk in the 2019–20 UEFA Champions League, becoming the first Zambian player to score in the competition's group stage.

On 18 December 2019, Daka extended his contract with Salzburg until the summer of 2024.

On 30 September 2020, he scored a brace in a 3–1 win over Maccabi Tel Aviv in the play-off round to qualify to the 2020–21 UEFA Champions League. On 21 May 2021, Daka was named Austrian Bundesliga player of the season after registering 27 goals in 28 games, as the club won their fourth successive league title.

=== Leicester City ===
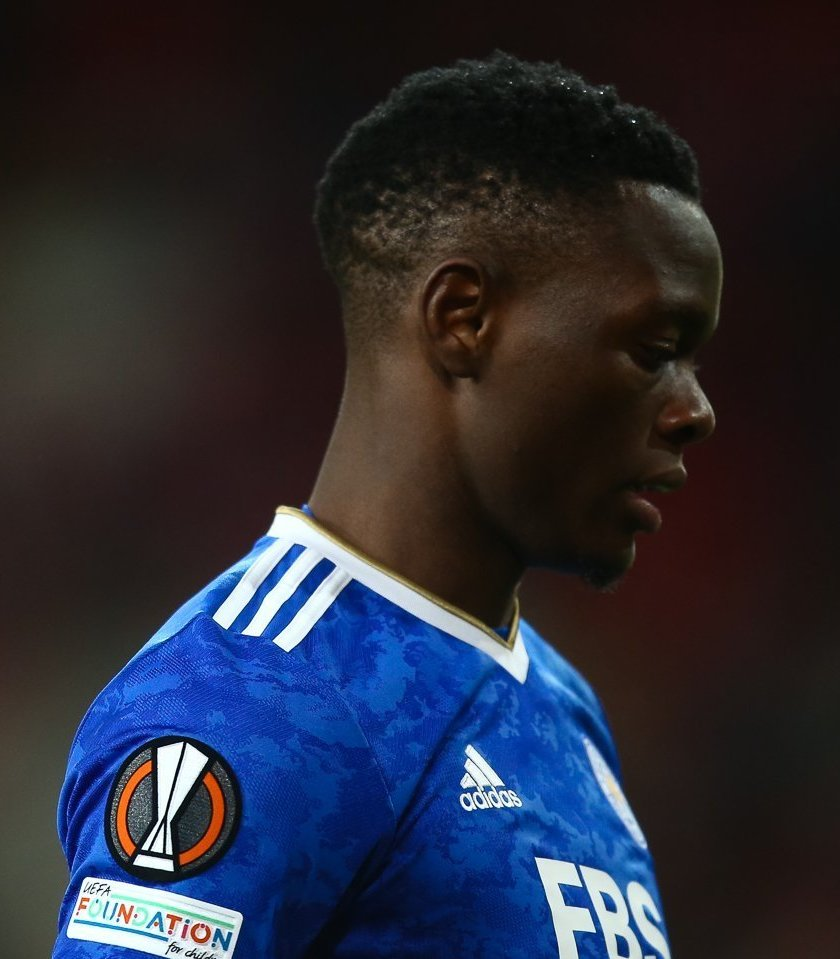
Daka playing for Leicester City in 2021

On 30 June 2021, Daka signed for Premier League club Leicester City on a five-year contract, for a reported fee of £23 million. Daka made his debut for the club with an appearance off the bench in Leicester's 1–0 triumph over reigning Premier League champions Manchester City in the FA Community Shield on 7 August. On 23 August, Daka made his Premier League debut as a substitute for Harvey Barnes in a 4–1 away defeat to West Ham United.

On 16 October, he scored his first goal for Leicester City in a 4–2 win against Manchester United at King Power Stadium. He followed this up on 20 October by scoring all four goals in a 4–3 win over Spartak Moscow in the 2021–22 UEFA Europa League, becoming the first Leicester player to score 4 in a game since 1958. On 25 November 2021, Daka became Leicester's all-time leading goalscorer in European competition by scoring in a 3–1 Europa League victory over Legia Warsaw.

On 24 May 2026, the club announced it was releasing the player following the team's relegation to EFL league One.

=== Hamburger SV ===
On 22 July 2026, Daka signed for Bundesliga club Hamburger SV.

== International career ==
Daka made his senior debut for Zambia in a 2–0 friendly victory over Malawi on 10 May 2015. He was the 2017 CAF Young Player of the Year.

On 10 December 2025, Daka was called up to the Zambia squad for the 2025 Africa Cup of Nations.

== Personal life ==
Daka's father, Nathtali Daka, was a former footballer who played as a winger for local club Kafue-based Nitrogen Stars. Daka is married to Zambian sprinter Suwilanji Mpondela. He is a devout Christian.

== Career statistics ==
=== Club ===
As of match played 6 November 2026

Appearances and goals by club, season and competition
Club	Season	League			National cup (Note: Includes Austrian Cup, FA Cup)		League cup (Note: Includes EFL Cup)		Continental		Other		Total	
Club	Season	Division	Apps	Goals	Apps	Goals	Apps	Goals	Apps	Goals	Apps	Goals	Apps	Goals
FC Liefering (loan)	2016–17	Austrian First League	9	2	—		—		—		—		9	2
FC Liefering (loan)	2017–18	Austrian First League	18	4	—		—		—		—		18	4
FC Liefering (loan)	Total		27	6	—		—		—		—		27	6
Red Bull Salzburg	2017–18	Austrian Bundesliga	8	0	2	1	—		2 (Note: Appearances in UEFA Europa League)	0	—		12	1
Red Bull Salzburg	2018–19	Austrian Bundesliga	15	3	3	1	—		8 (Note: Four appearances in UEFA Champions League, four appearances and two goals in UEFA Europa League)	2	—		26	6
Red Bull Salzburg	2019–20	Austrian Bundesliga	31	24	6	2	—		8 (Note: Six appearances and one goal in UEFA Champions League, two appearances in UEFA Europa League)	1	—		45	27
Red Bull Salzburg	2020–21	Austrian Bundesliga	28	27	6	5	—		8 (Note: Six appearances and two goals in UEFA Champions League, two appearances in UEFA Europa League)	2	—		42	34
Red Bull Salzburg	Total		82	54	17	9	—		26	5	—		125	68
Leicester City	2021–22	Premier League	23	5	1	0	3	0	10 (Note: Six appearances and five goals in UEFA Europa League, four appearances and one goal in UEFA Europa Conference League)	6	1 (Note: Appearance in FA Community Shield)	0	38	11
Leicester City	2022–23	Premier League	30	4	3	0	3	0	—		—		36	4
Leicester City	2023–24	Championship	20	7	1	0	1	0	—		—		22	7
Leicester City	2024–25	Premier League	23	1	2	0	0	0	—		—		25	1
Leicester City	2025–26	Championship	41	5	2	1	1	0	—		—		44	6
Leicester City	Total		137	22	9	1	8	0	10	6	1	0	165	29
Hamburger SV	2026–27	Bundesliga	6	0	2	0	—		—		—		8	0
Career total			252	82	28	10	8	0	36	11	1	0	325	103

=== International ===
As of match played 31 March 2026

Appearances and goals by national team and year
National team	Year	Apps	Goals
Zambia	2015	5	0
Zambia	2016	7	0
Zambia	2017	3	2
Zambia	2018	4	0
Zambia	2019	4	1
Zambia	2020	0	0
Zambia	2021	6	5
Zambia	2022	3	1
Zambia	2023	8	9
Zambia	2024	8	3
Zambia	2025	8	1
Zambia	2026	1	0
Total		57	22

Scores and results list Zambia's goal tally first.

List of international goals scored by Patson Daka
No.	Date	Venue	Opponent	Score	Result	Competition
1	5 September 2017	Mohamed Hamlaoui Stadium, Constantine, Algeria	Algeria	1–0	1–0	2018 FIFA World Cup qualification
2	11 November 2017	Levy Mwanawasa Stadium, Ndola, Zambia	Cameroon	1–0	2–2	2018 FIFA World Cup qualification
3	19 November 2019	National Heroes Stadium, Lusaka, Zambia	Zimbabwe	1–1	1–2	2021 Africa Cup of Nations qualification
4	25 March 2021	National Heroes Stadium, Lusaka, Zambia	Algeria	1–2	3–3	2021 Africa Cup of Nations qualification
5	25 March 2021	National Heroes Stadium, Lusaka, Zambia	Algeria	3–3	3–3	2021 Africa Cup of Nations qualification
6	29 March 2021	National Sports Stadium, Harare, Zimbabwe	Zimbabwe	1–0	2–0	2021 Africa Cup of Nations qualification
7	29 March 2021	National Sports Stadium, Harare, Zimbabwe	Zimbabwe	2–0	2–0	2021 Africa Cup of Nations qualification
8	13 November 2021	National Heroes Stadium, Lusaka, Zambia	Mauritania	1–0	4–0	2022 FIFA World Cup qualification
9	3 June 2022	Stade de Yamoussoukro, Yamoussoukro, Ivory Coast	Ivory Coast	1–3	1–3	2023 Africa Cup of Nations qualification
10	26 March 2023	Dobsonville Stadium, Johannesburg, South Africa	Lesotho	1–0	2–0	2023 Africa Cup of Nations qualification
11	26 March 2023	Dobsonville Stadium, Johannesburg, South Africa	Lesotho	2–0	2–0	2023 Africa Cup of Nations qualification
12	17 June 2023	Levy Mwanawasa Stadium, Ndola, Zambia	Ivory Coast	2–0	3–0	2023 Africa Cup of Nations qualification
13	9 September 2023	Stade Omnisports de Malouzini, Moroni, Comoros	Comoros	1–1	1–1	2023 Africa Cup of Nations qualification
14	17 October 2023	Al Hamriya Sports Club Stadium, Al Hamriyah, United Arab Emirates	Uganda	1–0	3–0	Friendly
15	17 October 2023	Al Hamriya Sports Club Stadium, Al Hamriyah, United Arab Emirates	Uganda	3–0	3–0	Friendly
16	17 November 2023	Levy Mwanawasa Stadium, Ndola, Zambia	Congo	1–0	4–2	2026 FIFA World Cup qualification
17	17 November 2023	Levy Mwanawasa Stadium, Ndola, Zambia	Congo	4–2	4–2	2026 FIFA World Cup qualification
18	21 November 2023	Stade de Marrakech, Marrakesh, Morocco	Niger	1–2	1–2	2026 FIFA World Cup qualification
19	9 January 2024	King Abdullah Sports City Stadium, Jeddah, Saudi Arabia	Cameroon	1–0	1–1	Friendly
20	21 January 2024	Laurent Pokou Stadium, San-Pédro, Ivory Coast	Tanzania	1–1	1–1	2023 Africa Cup of Nations
21	26 March 2024	Bingu National Stadium, Lilongwe, Malawi	Malawi	2–0	2–1	Friendly
22	22 December 2025	Mohammed V Stadium, Casablanca, Morocco	Mali	1–0	1–1	2025 Africa Cup of Nations

== Honours ==
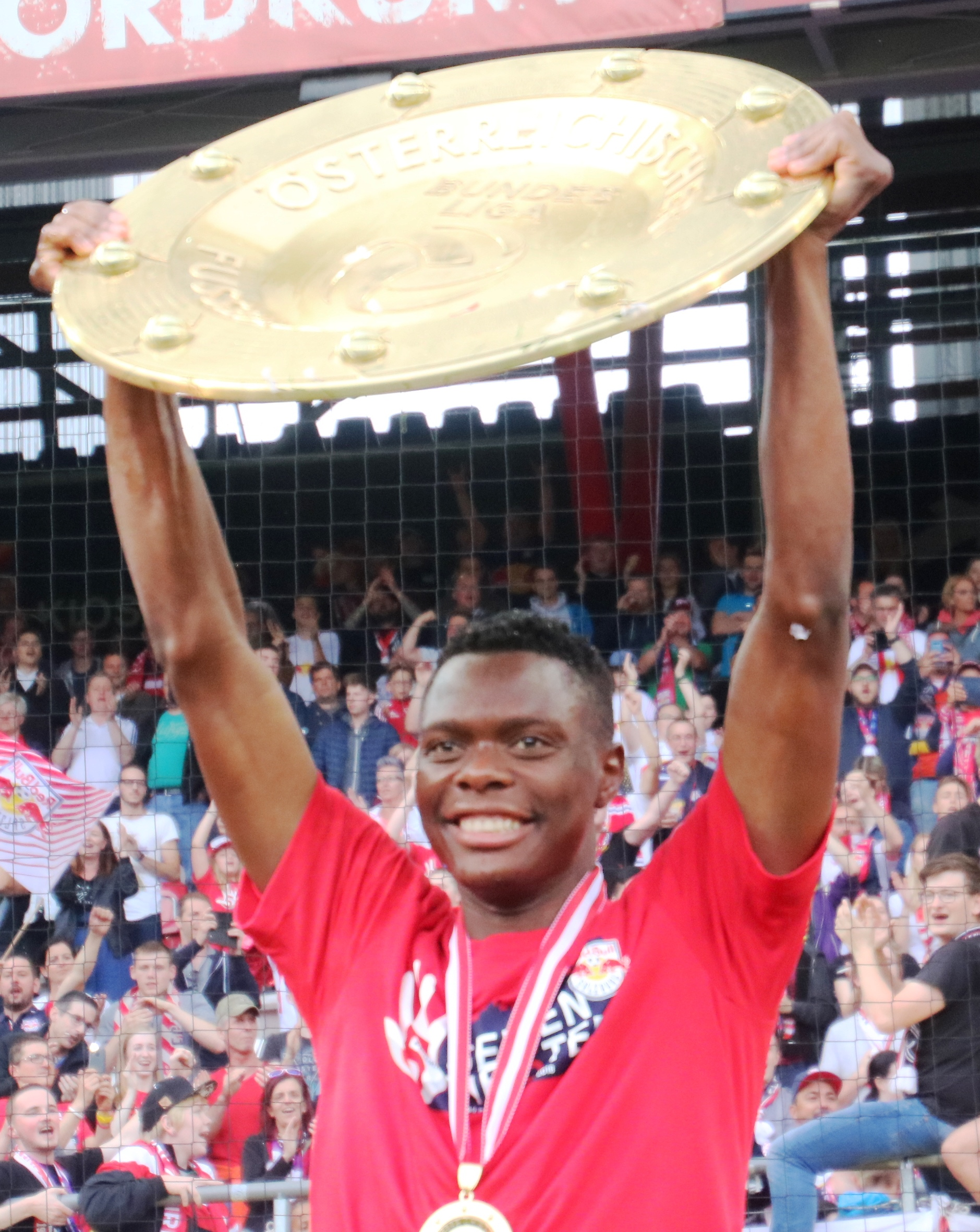
Daka holding the Austrian Bundesliga trophy in 2018

Red Bull Salzburg Youth

- UEFA Youth League: 2016–17

Red Bull Salzburg

- Austrian Bundesliga: 2017–18, 2018–19, 2019–20, 2020–21
- Austrian Cup: 2018–19, 2019–20, 2020–21

Leicester City

- FA Community Shield: 2021
- EFL Championship: 2023–24

Zambia U20

- Africa U-20 Cup of Nations: 2017
- COSAFA U-20 Cup: 2016

Individual

- Africa U-20 Cup of Nations Best Player: 2017
- Africa U-20 Cup of Nations Best XI: 2017
- CAF Youth Player of the Year: 2017
- Zambia Super League Young Player of the Year: 2014, 2016
- Zambia Sportsman of the Year: 2017
- Austrian Bundesliga Player of the Year: 2020–21
- Austrian Bundesliga Top scorer: 2020–21
- Austrian Bundesliga Team of the Year: 2020–21
- Africa Cup of Nations qualification Top scorer: 2021
