= Yoane Wissa =

DR Congo international footballer (born 1996)

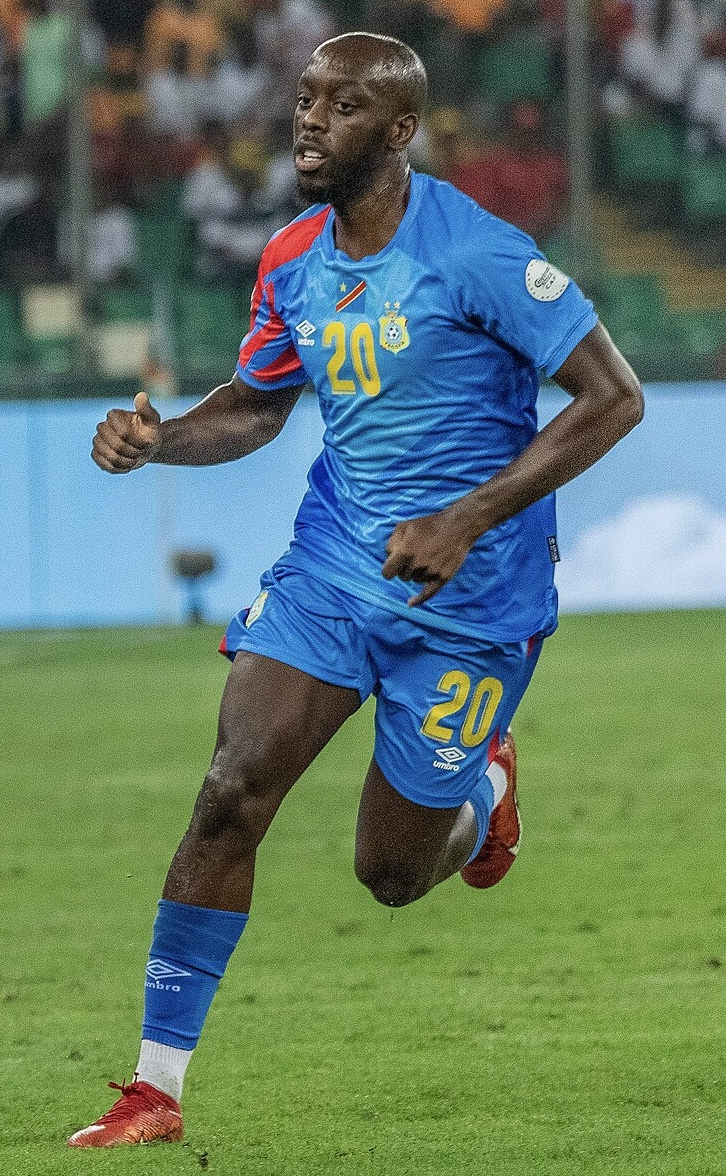
- Wissa playing for DR Congo in 2024

Personal information
- Full name: Yoane Wissa
- Date of birth: 3 September 1996 (age 30)
- Place of birth: Épinay-sous-Sénart, France
- Height: 1.76 m (5 ft 9 in)
- Positions: Striker; second striker; left winger

Team information
- Current team: Newcastle United
- Number: 9

Youth career
- 2004–2010: Épinay-sous-Sénart
- 2010–2011: Linas-Montlhéry
- 2011–2013: Épinay-sous-Sénart
- 2013–2015: Châteauroux

Senior career*
| Years | Team | Apps | (Gls) |
| 2014–2016 | Châteauroux II | 20 | (9) |
| 2015–2016 | Châteauroux | 23 | (7) |
| 2016–2018 | Angers | 2 | (0) |
| 2016–2017 | Angers II | 5 | (4) |
| 2017 | → Laval (loan) | 15 | (2) |
| 2017 | → Laval II (loan) | 1 | (0) |
| 2017–2018 | → Ajaccio (loan) | 20 | (9) |
| 2018–2021 | Lorient | 117 | (35) |
| 2021–2025 | Brentford | 137 | (45) |
| 2025– | Newcastle United | 29 | (2) |

International career^{‡}
| 2020– | DR Congo | 46 | (15) |
- * Club domestic league appearances and goals as of 23:54, 7 November 2026 (UTC) ‡ National team caps and goals as of 23:00, 12 November 2026 (UTC)

Yoane Wissa (born 3 September 1996) is a professional footballer who plays as a striker for Premier League club Newcastle United. Born in France, he represents the DR Congo national team.

A product of the Châteauroux academy, Wissa began his senior career with the club in 2015. Following a spell with Angers, he moved to Lorient in 2018. He was a part of their team that finished the 2019–20 Ligue 2 season as champions. After one season in Ligue 1, he joined Brentford in 2021. After four seasons at Brentford, Wissa joined Newcastle United in 2025.

== Club career ==
=== Early years ===
Wissa began his youth career as a goalkeeper at the age of seven. He played for his local youth club Épinay-sous-Sénart, before moving to midfield and then the forward line. As his youth career progressed, he also became adept as a winger and number 10. Wissa began his senior career as a forward with Châteauroux and progressed through the reserve team to break into the first team during the 2015–16 Championnat National season, which he finished with 24 appearances and seven goals.

A transfer to Ligue 1 club Angers followed in 2016, but Wissa managed just two substitute appearances during the first half of the 2016–17 season and he played much of 2017 away on loan at Ligue 2 clubs Laval and Ajaccio. Wissa departed the Stade Raymond Kopa in January 2018.

=== Lorient ===
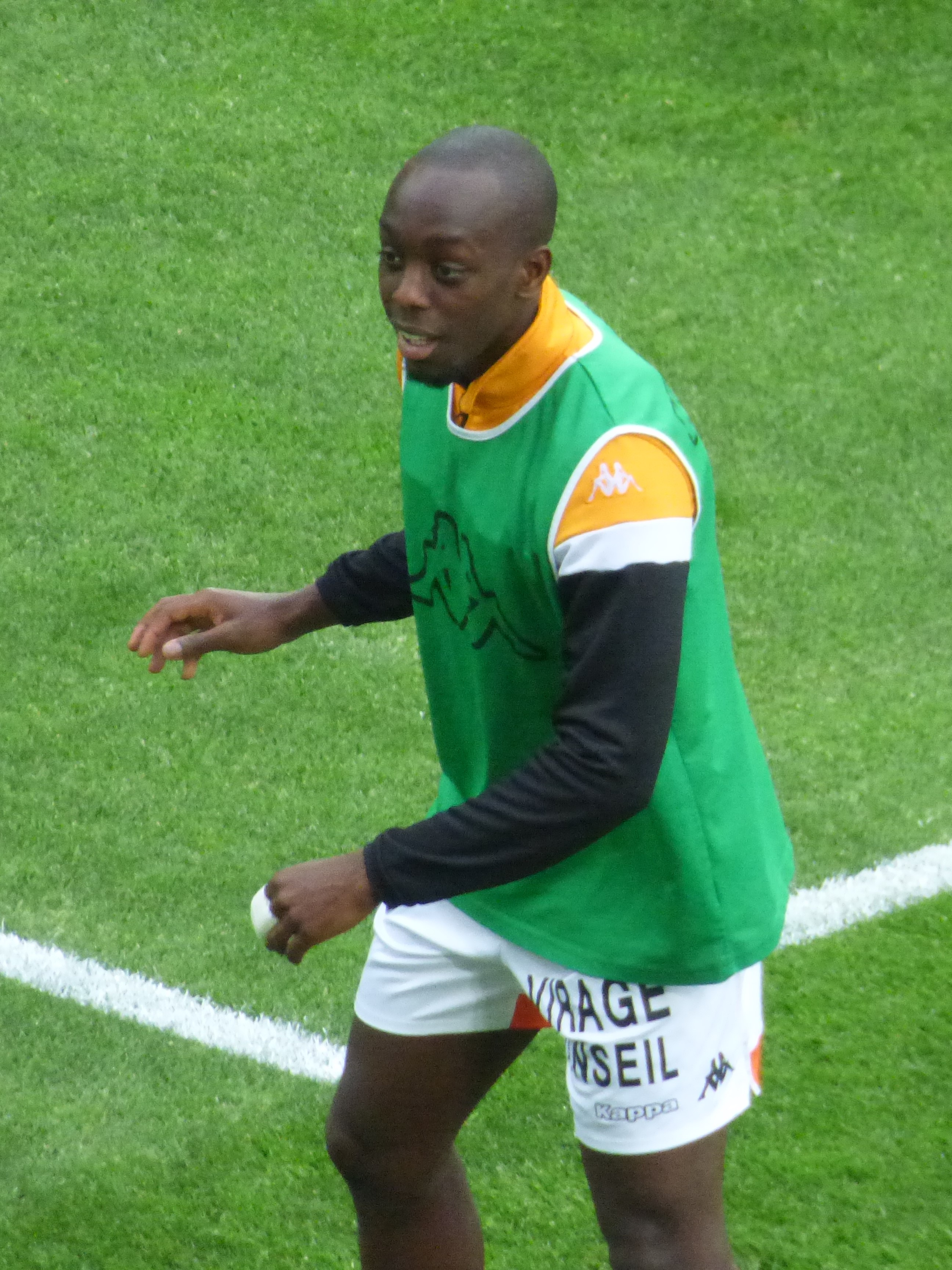
Wissa warming up for Lorient in 2019.

In January 2018, Wissa transferred to Ligue 2 club Lorient and immediately established himself at the promotion-chasing club. Promotion to Ligue 1 was attained at the end of the 2019–20 season, when Wissa's 15 goals in 28 appearances helped the club to the Ligue 2 championship.

He made 38 appearances and scored 10 goals during the 2020–21 season, in which Lorient narrowly avoided finishing in the relegation playoff places. Wissa departed the club in August 2021 and finished his 3 1/2-year stay at the Stade du Moustoir with 128 appearances and 37 goals.

=== Brentford ===
==== 2021–22 ====
On 10 August 2021, Wissa moved to England to join newly-promoted Premier League club Brentford on a four-year contract, with the option of a further year, for an undisclosed fee, reported to be £8.5 million. The transfer had been in the works for two years and he had turned down the opportunity to move to the Community Stadium during the previous transfer window. Despite being unable to link up with the club during pre-season after undergoing eye surgery, Wissa scored five goals in his first six appearances for the club.

His brace in a 7–0 EFL Cup third round win over Oldham Athletic on 21 September 2021 was recognised with a place in the EFL Cup Team of the Round and his second goal, a bicycle kick, was voted Goal of the Round and Goal of the Tournament. Wissa's goalscoring run was ended by an ankle knock suffered in mid-October 2021. He returned to match play two months later and was deployed in a mixture of starting and substitute roles through to the end of the season. Wissa ended the 2021–22 season with 34 appearances and 10 goals.

==== 2022–2024 ====
Wissa was deployed in a mix of starting and substitute roles and scored seven goals in 40 appearances during the 2022–23 season, in which Brentford were in contention for a European place on the final day. In May 2023, he signed a new three-year contract, with the option of a further year.

Following Ivan Toney's eight-month ban from all football-related activity, Wissa began the 2023–24 season as Brentford's starting centre forward. Following the transfer deadline day loan signing of forward Neal Maupay, Wissa alternated between the forward and left wing positions. Wissa top-scored for the club during the 2023–24 season, with 12 goals from 36 appearances, predominantly as a starter. He ended the season with a run of eight goals in 13 league matches.

==== 2024–2025 ====
A long-term injury suffered by new centre forward signing Igor Thiago during the 2024–25 pre-season allowed Wissa to begin the regular season in the position. He began the season with three goals from four Premier League starting appearances and three goals across four appearances in November 2024 saw him nominated for the Premier League Player of the Month award. Wissa's 37th Premier League goal, scored in a 2–2 draw with Manchester City on 14 January 2025, made him the club's record Premier League goalscorer. He ended the 2024–25 season with 39 appearances and a season-high 20 goals.

=== Newcastle United ===
On 1 September 2025, Wissa completed a transfer to Newcastle United for a fee of £50 million plus add ons, ending his four-year spell with Brentford. Later that year, on 6 December, he made his debut in a 2–1 victory over Burnley, becoming the 1000th player to represent the club in the league. A few days later, on 10 December, he made his UEFA Champions League debut, coming on in the stoppage time of a 2–2 away draw against Bayer Leverkusen.

A week later, on 17 December, he scored his first goal for the club in the EFL Cup quarter-final, which ended in a 2–1 victory over Fulham. On 30 December, he netted his first league goal for the club in a 3–1 away victory over Burnley. On 21 January 2026, he scored his first Champions League goal in a 3–0 victory over PSV Eindhoven.

== International career ==
Wissa won his maiden call into the DR Congo squad for a pair of friendly matches in October 2020. He scored his first two international goals on his second and third caps, in friendly and 2022 FIFA World Cup qualifying matches versus Morocco respectively.

Wissa was a part of the DR Congo squad which qualified for the 2023 Africa Cup of Nations and he was named in the squad for the tournament finals. He appeared in each match and scored two goals during the team's run to the third place play-off, which was lost on penalties to South Africa. Wissa's performances were recognised with a place in the Team of the Tournament.

On 19 May 2026, he was included in the 26-man squad selected by head coach Sébastien Desabre to represent the DR Congo at the 2026 FIFA World Cup. He scored DR Congo's first-ever FIFA World Cup goal in their 1–1 draw against Portugal in the opening group stage match on 17 June, earning the country its first point in the tournament. On 27 June, he scored a brace and earned Man of the Match award in a 3–1 victory over Uzbekistan, securing his nation's first-ever World Cup win and qualification for the knockout stage. In addition, he became the fourth African player to score three goals in a World Cup group stage, following Papa Bouba Diop in 2002, and both Ismael Saibari and Ismaïla Sarr earlier in the tournament. Wissa nearly scored another goal during DR Congo's round of 32 match against England on 1 July, but the ball hit the right-side goalpost. DR Congo ultimately lost to England.

== Style of play ==
Wissa has been described as a player who "fits many different positions", including winger, number 10 and forward. He has "pace and power", is "a threat in behind", "has good ability to take on players and create overloads" and "good pressing abilities". At Brentford, along with Bryan Mbeumo, he formed a lethal duo with 39 Premier League goals between each other in the 2024/2025 season.

== Personal life ==
Born in France of Congolese descent, Wissa can speak the Lingala language. He acquired French nationality in December 2000 through the collective effect of his parents' naturalisation.

Prior to making the decision to concentrate on football at age 15, he also played rugby union. He was the subject of an acid attack in July 2021 and made a full recovery from emergency eye surgery.

In September 2025 he graduated from the PFA Business School with a Postgraduate Diploma in Global Football Business Management, an award from the University of Portsmouth.

Wissa is Practicing Muslim.

== Career statistics ==
=== Club ===
As of match played 7 November 2026

Appearances and goals by club, season and competition
| Club | Season | League | | | National cup (Note: Includes Coupe de France, FA Cup) | | League cup (Note: Includes Coupe de la Ligue, EFL Cup) | | Europe | | Total | |
| Club | Season | Division | Apps | Goals | Apps | Goals | Apps | Goals | Apps | Goals | Apps | Goals |
|---|---|---|---|---|---|---|---|---|---|---|---|---|
| Châteauroux II | 2013–14 | CFA 2 Group G | 1 | 0 | ― | | ― | | ― | | 1 | 0 |
| Châteauroux II | 2014–15 | CFA 2 Group B | 14 | 9 | ― | | ― | | ― | | 14 | 9 |
| Châteauroux II | 2015–16 | CFA 2 Group B | 5 | 0 | ― | | ― | | ― | | 5 | 0 |
| Châteauroux II | Total | | 20 | 9 | ― | | ― | | ― | | 20 | 9 |
| Châteauroux | 2015–16 | Championnat National | 23 | 7 | 0 | 0 | 1 | 0 | ― | | 24 | 7 |
| Angers | 2016–17 | Ligue 1 | 2 | 0 | 0 | 0 | 0 | 0 | ― | | 2 | 0 |
| Angers II | 2016–17 | CFA 2 Group A | 5 | 4 | ― | | ― | | ― | | 5 | 4 |
| Laval (loan) | 2016–17 | Ligue 2 | 15 | 2 | — | | — | | ― | | 15 | 2 |
| Laval II (loan) | 2016–17 | CFA 2 Group A | 1 | 0 | ― | | ― | | ― | | 1 | 0 |
| Ajaccio (loan) | 2017–18 | Ligue 2 | 20 | 8 | 2 | 2 | 1 | 0 | ― | | 23 | 10 |
| Lorient | 2017–18 | Ligue 2 | 15 | 4 | 1 | 0 | ― | | ― | | 16 | 4 |
| Lorient | 2018–19 | Ligue 2 | 36 | 6 | 1 | 0 | 3 | 0 | ― | | 40 | 6 |
| Lorient | 2019–20 | Ligue 2 | 28 | 15 | 4 | 1 | 0 | 0 | ― | | 32 | 16 |
| Lorient | 2020–21 | Ligue 1 | 38 | 10 | 2 | 1 | — | | ― | | 40 | 11 |
| Lorient | Total | | 117 | 35 | 8 | 2 | 3 | 0 | ― | | 128 | 37 |
| Brentford | 2021–22 | Premier League | 30 | 7 | 1 | 0 | 3 | 3 | ― | | 34 | 10 |
| Brentford | 2022–23 | Premier League | 38 | 7 | 1 | 0 | 1 | 0 | ― | | 40 | 7 |
| Brentford | 2023–24 | Premier League | 34 | 12 | 0 | 0 | 2 | 0 | ― | | 36 | 12 |
| Brentford | 2024–25 | Premier League | 35 | 19 | 1 | 0 | 3 | 1 | ― | | 39 | 20 |
| Brentford | Total | | 137 | 45 | 3 | 0 | 9 | 4 | ― | | 149 | 49 |
| Newcastle United | 2025–26 | Premier League | 19 | 1 | 2 | 0 | 3 | 1 | 4 (Note: Appearances in UEFA Champions League) | 1 | 28 | 3 |
| Newcastle United | 2026–27 | Premier League | 10 | 1 | 0 | 0 | 3 | 0 | ― | | 13 | 1 |
| Newcastle United | Total | | 29 | 2 | 2 | 0 | 6 | 1 | 4 | 1 | 41 | 4 |
| Career total | | | 269 | 112 | 15 | 4 | 20 | 5 | 4 | 1 | 307 | 122 |

=== International ===
As of match played 12 November 2026

Appearances and goals by national team and year
| National team | Year | Apps | Goals |
|---|---|---|---|
| DR Congo | 2020 | 2 | 1 |
| DR Congo | 2022 | 6 | 1 |
| DR Congo | 2023 | 8 | 1 |
| DR Congo | 2024 | 13 | 2 |
| DR Congo | 2025 | 6 | 3 |
| DR Congo | 2026 | 11 | 7 |
| Total | | 46 | 15 |

As of match played 12 November 2026
Scores and results list DR Congo's goal tally first, score column indicates score after each Wissa goal.

List of international goals scored by Yoane Wissa
| No. | Date | Venue | Opponent | Score | Result | Competition | Ref. |
|---|---|---|---|---|---|---|---|
| 1 | 13 October 2020 | Prince Moulay Abdellah Stadium, Rabat, Morocco | Morocco | 1–1 | 1–1 | Friendly | |
| 2 | 25 March 2022 | Stade des Martyrs, Kinshasa, DR Congo | Morocco | 1–0 | 1–1 | 2022 FIFA World Cup qualification | |
| 3 | 15 November 2023 | Stade des Martyrs, Kinshasa, DR Congo | Mauritania | 1–0 | 2–0 | 2026 FIFA World Cup qualification | |
| 4 | 17 January 2024 | Laurent Pokou Stadium, San-Pédro, Ivory Coast | Zambia | 1–1 | 1–1 | 2023 Africa Cup of Nations | |
| 5 | 2 February 2024 | Alassane Ouattara Stadium, Abidjan, Ivory Coast | Guinea | 2–1 | 3–1 | 2023 Africa Cup of Nations | |
| 6 | 8 June 2025 | Stade de la Source, Orléans, France | Madagascar | 2–0 | 3–1 | Friendly | |
| 7 | 5 September 2025 | Juba Stadium, Juba, South Sudan | South Sudan | 4–0 | 4–1 | 2026 FIFA World Cup qualification | |
| 8 | 9 September 2025 | Stade des Martyrs, Kinshasa, DR Congo | Senegal | 2–0 | 2–3 | 2026 FIFA World Cup qualification | |
| 9 | 25 March 2026 | Estadio Akron, Guadalajara, Mexico | Bermuda | 2–0 | 2–0 | Friendly | |
| 10 | 17 June 2026 | NRG Stadium, Houston, United States | Portugal | 1–1 | 1–1 | 2026 FIFA World Cup | |
| 11 | 27 June 2026 | Mercedes-Benz Stadium, Atlanta, United States | Uzbekistan | 1–1 | 3–1 | 2026 FIFA World Cup | |
| 12 | 27 June 2026 | Mercedes-Benz Stadium, Atlanta, United States | Uzbekistan | 3–1 | 3–1 | 2026 FIFA World Cup | |
| 13 | 24 September 2026 | Stade des Martyrs, Kinshasa, DR Congo | Equatorial Guinea | 2–0 | 2–0 | 2027 Africa Cup of Nations qualification | |
| 14 | 28 September 2026 | National Sports Stadium, Harare, Zimbabwe | Zimbabwe | 1–0 | 2–1 | 2027 Africa Cup of Nations qualification | |
| 15 | 12 November 2026 | Stade des Martyrs, Kinshasa, DR Congo | Sierra Leone | 1–0 | 3–1 | 2027 Africa Cup of Nations qualification | |

== Honours ==
Lorient

- Ligue 2: 2019–20

Individual

- Africa Cup of Nations Team of the Tournament: 2023
