= Silas Katompa Mvumpa =

Congolese footballer (born 1998)

Silas
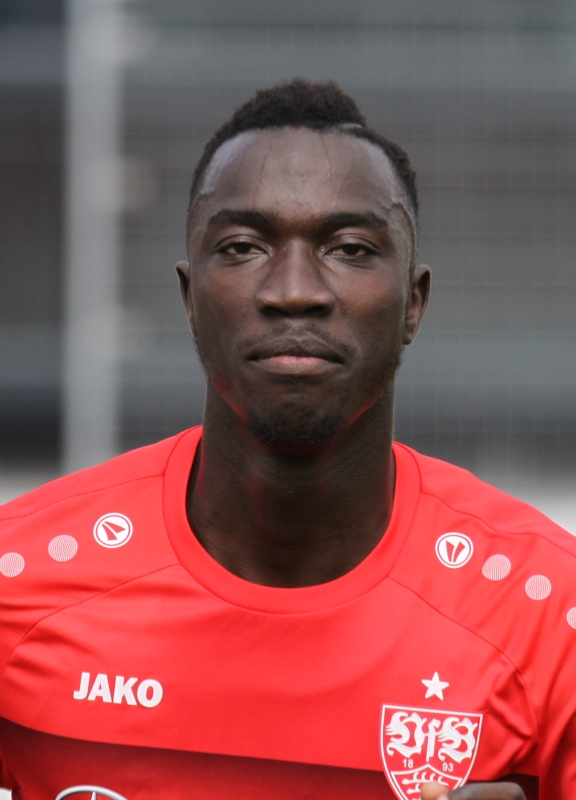
- Silas with VfB Stuttgart in 2019

Personal information
- Full name: Silas Katompa Mvumpa
- Date of birth: 6 October 1998 (age 28)
- Place of birth: Kinshasa, DR Congo
- Height: 1.89 m (6 ft 2 in)
- Positions: Forward; right winger

Team information
- Current team: Mainz 05
- Number: 26

Youth career
- 2011–2017: Olympic Matete FC
- 2017–2018: Alès

Senior career*
Years	Team	Apps	(Gls)
2018	Alès	6	(1)
2018–2019	Paris FC	34	(11)
2018	Paris FC II	1	(1)
2019–2026	VfB Stuttgart	120	(28)
2024–2025	→ Red Star Belgrade (loan)	16	(5)
2026–	Mainz 05	8	(1)

International career^{‡}
2023–	DR Congo	19	(1)
- * Club domestic league appearances and goals as of 7 March 2026 ‡ National team caps and goals as of 25 March 2025

Silas Katompa Mvumpa (born 6 October 1998), known simply as Silas and formerly as Silas Wamangituka Fundu, is a Congolese professional footballer who plays as a forward or right winger for German Bundesliga club Mainz 05 and the DR Congo national team.

== Club career ==
=== Early career ===
Silas began playing football in Kinshasa, DR Congo with his local club Olympic Matete FC. At the age of 17, his performances earned him a move to Alès in France, and after his debut season, he moved to Paris FC in the Ligue 2. Silas made his professional debut for Paris FC in a 2–0 win over Troyes on 31 August 2018. On 11 September 2018, he signed his first professional contract with the club for three years.

=== VfB Stuttgart ===
On 13 August 2019, Silas signed a five-year deal with German club VfB Stuttgart. He played a big part in Stuttgart's promotion to the Bundesliga in the 2019–20 season, scoring 7 league goals.

On 1 January 2023, Silas extended his contract with VfB Stuttgart until June 2026. On 19 August 2023, Silas scored a brace in a 5–0 win over VfL Bochum in the 2023–24 Bundesliga opener.

==== Loan to Red Star Belgrade ====
On 3 September 2024, Silas joined Serbian club Red Star Belgrade, on loan from VfB Stuttgart. He made his debut for the club on 14 September, in a 2–0 win against Napredak in the Serbian SuperLiga. He scored his first goal for the club on 23 September, in a 4–0 away win against rivals Partizan. Two weeks later, on 6 November, he scored his first UEFA Champions League goal in a 5–2 defeat against Barcelona. Later that month, on 27 November, he netted a goal in a 5–1 victory over his parent club Stuttgart in the European competition.

=== Mainz 05 ===
On 7 January 2026, Silas joined fellow Bundesliga club Mainz 05 for an undisclosed fee.

== International career ==
Silas debuted for the DR Congo national team in a 3–1 2023 Africa Cup of Nations qualification win over Mauritania on 24 March 2023. On 21 January 2024, he scored his first international goal in a 1–1 draw against Morocco in the 2023 Africa Cup of Nations.

== Identity ==
On 8 June 2021, VfB Stuttgart released a statement that revealed that Silas's real name is actually Silas Katompa Mvumpa, and not Silas Wamangituka Fundu as previously thought. Stuttgart believed that Silas's agent had altered Mvumpa's identity to increase the player's dependence on the agent. Furthermore, Silas was revealed to be one year older, with his actual birth year being 1998. He stated that a new agent and club helped him gain the confidence to reveal these details, after having had them held against him as a threat by his previous agent; Stuttgart did not expect any sanctions against the club and player. However, on 11 June, Silas was fined €30,000 and banned for three months by the German Football Association.

== Career statistics ==
=== Club ===
As of match played 12 March 2026

Appearances and goals by club, season and competition
Club	Season	League			National cup (Note: Includes DFB-Pokal)		Europe		Other		Total	
Club	Season	Division	Apps	Goals	Apps	Goals	Apps	Goals	Apps	Goals	Apps	Goals
Alès	2017–18	CFA 2	6	1	—		—		—		6	1
Paris FC	2018–19	Ligue 2	32	11	0	0	—		1 (Note: Appearance in Ligue 2 promotion play-offs)	0	33	11
Paris FC	2019–20	Ligue 2	2	0	—		—		—		2	0
Paris FC	Total		34	11	0	0	—		1	0	35	11
VfB Stuttgart	2019–20	2. Bundesliga	29	7	2	1	—		—		31	8
VfB Stuttgart	2020–21	Bundesliga	25	11	2	2	—		—		27	13
VfB Stuttgart	2021–22	Bundesliga	9	0	0	0	—		—		9	0
VfB Stuttgart	2022–23	Bundesliga	30	5	3	1	—		1 (Note: Appearance in Bundesliga relegation play-offs)	1	34	7
VfB Stuttgart	2023–24	Bundesliga	27	5	3	2	—		—		30	7
VfB Stuttgart	2024–25	Bundesliga	0	0	0	0	—		1 (Note: Appearance in DFL-Supercup)	0	1	0
VfB Stuttgart	2025–26	Bundesliga	0	0	0	0	0	0	—		0	0
VfB Stuttgart	Total		120	28	10	6	—		2	1	132	35
Red Star Belgrade (loan)	2024–25	Serbian SuperLiga	16	5	0	0	8 (Note: Appearances in UEFA Champions League)	2	—		24	7
Mainz 05	2025–26	Bundesliga	8	1	0	0	1 (Note: Appearance in UEFA Conference League)	0	—		9	1
Career total			184	46	10	6	9	2	3	1	206	55

=== International ===
As of match played 25 March 2025

Appearances and goals by national team and year
National team	Year	Apps	Goals
DR Congo	2023	6	0
DR Congo	2024	11	1
DR Congo	2025	1	0
DR Congo	2026	1	0
Total		19	1

Scores and results list DR Congo's goal tally first, score column indicates score after each Silas goal.

List of international goals scored by Silas Katompa Mvumpa
No.	Date	Venue	Opponent	Score	Result	Competition
1	21 January 2024	Laurent Pokou Stadium, San-Pédro, Ivory Coast	Morocco	1–1	1–1	2023 Africa Cup of Nations

== Honours ==
Red Star Belgrade

- Serbian SuperLiga: 2024–25
- Serbian Cup: 2024–25

Individual

- Bundesliga Rookie of the Season: 2020–21
- Bundesliga Rookie of the Month: November 2020, December 2020, February 2021
