= 2023 Africa Cup of Nations qualification Group H =

Association football tournament group

Group H of the 2023 Africa Cup of Nations qualification tournament was one of the twelve groups that decided a team which qualified for the 2023 Africa Cup of Nations finals tournament. The group consisted of four teams: Ivory Coast, Zambia, Comoros and Lesotho (winners of the preliminary round).

As the hosts of the 2023 Africa Cup of Nations, Ivory Coast participated in the qualifiers with the team guaranteed a spot in the finals regardless of their ranking in the group. Their matches and results counted in determining the qualification of the other teams from their group.

The teams played against each other in a home-and-away round-robin format between 9 June 2022 and 9 September 2023.

Zambia, the group winners, joined Ivory Coast, the group runners-up and tournament hosts, in qualifying for the 2023 Africa Cup of Nations.

== Standings ==
| Pos | Team | Pld | W | D | L | GF | GA | GD | Pts | Qualification | Zambia | Côte d'Ivoire | Comoros | Lesotho |
|---|---|---|---|---|---|---|---|---|---|---|---|---|---|---|
| 1 | Zambia | 6 | 4 | 1 | 1 | 12 | 6 | +6 | 13 (Note: Head-to-head goal difference: Zambia 1, Ivory Coast –1.) | Final tournament | — | 3–0 | 2–1 | 3–1 |
| 2 | Ivory Coast | 6 | 4 | 1 | 1 | 9 | 5 | +4 | 13 | Final tournament | 3–1 | — | 3–1 | 1–0 |
| 3 | Comoros | 6 | 2 | 1 | 3 | 6 | 8 | −2 | 7 | | 1–1 | 0–2 | — | 2–0 |
| 4 | Lesotho | 6 | 0 | 1 | 5 | 1 | 9 | −8 | 1 | | 0–2 | 0–0 | 0–1 | — |

Source: CAF
Rules for classification: Tiebreakers

== Matches ==
3 June 2022
16:00 UTC+3

| Comoros | 2–0 | Lesotho |
|---|---|---|
| M'Changama 59'; B. Youssouf 81' | Report |

Stade Omnisports de Malouzini, Moroni
Referee: Andofetra Rakotojaona (Madagascar)
3 June 2022
19:00 UTC+0

| Ivory Coast | 3–1 | Zambia |
|---|---|---|
| Aurier 67'; Kouamé 76'; I. Sangaré 89' | Report | Daka 90+4' |

Charles Konan Banny Stadium, Yamoussoukro
Referee: Dahane Beida (Mauritania)

7 June 2022
18:00 UTC+2

| Zambia | 2–1 | Comoros |
|---|---|---|
| Mwepu 45+2'; K. Kangwa 88' | Report | Ben Nabouhane 13' |

National Heroes Stadium, Lusaka
Referee: Samuel Uwikunda (Rwanda)
9 June 2022
19:00 UTC+2

| Lesotho | 0–0 | Ivory Coast |
|---|---|---|
| | Report |

Dobsonville Stadium, Johannesburg (South Africa)
Referee: Patrice Milazare (Mauritius)

23 March 2023
18:00 UTC+2

| Zambia | 3–1 | Lesotho |
|---|---|---|
| F. Sakala 37'; L. Banda 53', 57' | Report | Bereng 33' |

Levy Mwanawasa Stadium, Ndola
Referee: Messie Nkounkou (Congo)
24 March 2023
16:00 UTC+0

| Ivory Coast | 3–1 | Comoros |
|---|---|---|
| Kouamé 29'; Haller 61'; Krasso 89' | Report | Djoudja 90+3' |

Stade de la Paix, Bouaké
Referee: Abdel Aziz Mohamed Bouh (Mauritania)

26 March 2023
15:00 UTC+2

| Lesotho | 0–2 | Zambia |
|---|---|---|
| | Report | Daka 14', 69' |

Dobsonville Stadium, Johannesburg (South Africa)
Referee: Chelanget Sabila (Uganda)
28 March 2023
22:00 UTC+3

| Comoros | 0–2 | Ivory Coast |
|---|---|---|
| | Report | I. Sangaré 36'; Kessié 58' |

Stade Omnisports de Malouzini, Moroni
Referee: Peter Waweru (Kenya)

17 June 2023
15:00 UTC+2

| Zambia | 3–0 | Ivory Coast |
|---|---|---|
| Aurier 31' (o.g.); Daka 48'; Kangwa 55' | Report |

Levy Mwanawasa Stadium, Ndola
Referee: Bamlak Tessema Weyesa (Ethiopia)
17 June 2023
16:00 UTC+2

| Lesotho | 0–1 | Comoros |
|---|---|---|
| | Report | M'Changama 90' |

Orlando Stadium, Johannesburg (South Africa)
Referee: Celso Armindo Alvação (Mozambique)

9 September 2023
16:00 UTC+0

| Ivory Coast | 1–0 | Lesotho |
|---|---|---|
| I. Sangaré 16' | Report |

Laurent Pokou Stadium, San Pédro
Referee: Samuel Uwikunda (Rwanda)
9 September 2023
22:00 UTC+3

| Comoros | 1–1 | Zambia |
|---|---|---|
| B. Youssouf 45' | Report | Daka 71' |

Stade Omnisports de Malouzini, Moroni
Referee: Pacifique Ndabihawenimana (Burundi)

== Goalscorers ==
There were 28 goals scored in 12 matches, for an average of 2.33 goals per match.

5 goals

- (Zambia) Patson Daka

3 goals

- (Ivory Coast) Ibrahim Sangaré

2 goals

- (Comoros) Youssouf M'Changama
- (Comoros) Benjaloud Youssouf
- (Ivory Coast) Christian Kouamé
- (Zambia) Lameck Banda
- (Zambia) Kings Kangwa

1 goal

- (Comoros) El Fardou Ben Nabouhane
- (Comoros) Ibroihim Djoudja
- (Ivory Coast) Serge Aurier
- (Ivory Coast) Sébastien Haller
- (Ivory Coast) Franck Kessié
- (Ivory Coast) Jean-Philippe Krasso
- (Lesotho) Tshwarelo Bereng
- (Zambia) Enock Mwepu
- (Zambia) Fashion Sakala

1 own goal

- (Ivory Coast) Serge Aurier (against Zambia)
