= Kings Kangwa =

Zambian footballer (born 1999)

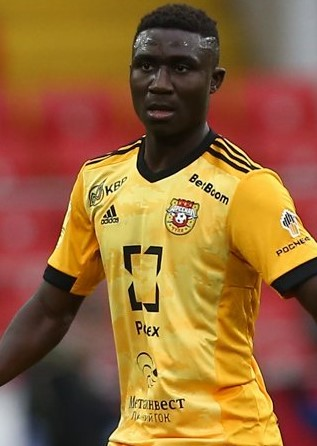
- Kangwa with Arsenal Tula in 2022

Personal information
- Date of birth: 6 April 1999 (age 27)
- Place of birth: Kasama, Zambia
- Height: 1.70 m (5 ft 7 in)
- Position: Midfielder

Team information
- Current team: Panathinaikos
- Number: 42

Youth career
- Happy Hearts
- 2017–2018: → Hapoel Be'er Sheva

Senior career*
Years	Team	Apps	(Gls)
2017–2019	Happy Hearts	35	(5)
2019–2019	Buildcon	24	(4)
2019–2022	Arsenal Tula	48	(5)
2022–2024	Red Star Belgrade	42	(8)
2024–2024	→ Kortrijk (loan)	10	(0)
2024–2026	Hapoel Be'er Sheva	68	(26)
2026–	Panathinaikos	9	(1)

International career^{‡}
2019	Zambia U23	3	(0)
2019–	Zambia	46	(7)
- * Club domestic league appearances and goals as of 22:42, 1 November 2026 (UTC) ‡ National team caps and goals as of 20:37, 20 May 2026 (UTC)

Kings Kangwa (born 6 April 1999) is a Zambian professional footballer who plays as a midfielder for Super League Greece club Panathinaikos and the Zambia national team.

== Club career ==
Kangwa began his career at Lusaka-based club Happy Hearts. In 2017, Kangwa signed for Israeli club Hapoel Be'er Sheva, before returning to Happy Hearts in 2018. Ahead of the 2019 Zambian Super League season, Kangwa signed for Buildcon. On 10 July 2019, Kangwa joined Russian club Arsenal Tula. On 29 May 2022, Kangwa joined Serbian club Red Star Belgrade before returning to Hapoel Be'er Sheva in 2024 for two more years.

On 1 February 2024, Kangwa joined Kortrijk in Belgium on loan.

== International career ==
In November 2018, Kangwa was called up by Zambia U20 ahead of the 2018 COSAFA U-20 Cup.

On 9 June 2019, Kangwa made his debut for Zambia in a 2–1 loss against Cameroon. On 16 July 2019, Kangwa scored his first goal for Zambia in a 3–2 win against Morocco.

On 10 December 2025, Kangwa was called up to the Zambia squad for the 2025 Africa Cup of Nations.

== Career statistics ==
=== Club ===
As of match played 5 November 2026

Appearances and goals by club, season and competition
Club	Season	League			National cup (Note: Includes Russian Cup, Serbian Cup, Belgian Cup, Israel State Cup, Greek Football Cup)		League cup (Note: Includes Toto Cup)		Continental		Other		Total	
Club	Season	Division	Apps	Goals	Apps	Goals	Apps	Goals	Apps	Goals	Apps	Goals	Apps	Goals
Arsenal Tula	2019–20	Russian Premier League	8	0	1	0	–		–		–		9	0
Arsenal Tula	2020–21	Russian Premier League	21	1	3	0	–		–		–		24	1
Arsenal Tula	2021–22	Russian Premier League	19	4	3	1	–		–		–		22	5
Arsenal Tula	Total		48	5	7	1	–		–		–		55	6
Red Star Belgrade	2022–23	Serbian SuperLiga	32	8	5	3	–		8 (Note: Four appearances and one goal in UEFA Champions League, four appearances in UEFA Europa League)	1	–		45	12
Red Star Belgrade	2023–24	Serbian SuperLiga	10	0	0	0	–		1 (Note: Appearance(s) in UEFA Champions League)	0	–		11	0
Red Star Belgrade	Total		42	8	5	3	–		9	1	–		56	12
Kortrijk	2023–24	Belgian Pro League	10	0	2	0	–		–		–		12	0
Hapoel Be'er Sheva	2024–25	Israeli Premier League	35	14	4	1	1	0	2 (Note: Appearances in UEFA Conference League)	0	–		42	15
Hapoel Be'er Sheva	2025–26	Israeli Premier League	33	12	2	0	1	0	3 (Note: One appearance in UEFA Europa League, two appearances in UEFA Conference League)	0	1 (Note: Appearance in Israel Super Cup)	0	40	12
Hapoel Be'er Sheva	2026–27	Israeli Premier League	0	0	0	0	0	0	2	1	1	1	3	2
Hapoel Be'er Sheva	Total		68	26	6	1	2	0	7	1	2	1	84	29
Panathinaikos	2026–27	Super League Greece	9	1	2	0	–		3 (Note: Appearances in UEFA Conference League)	2	–		14	3
Career total			177	40	22	5	2	0	19	4	2	1	221	50

=== International ===
As of match played 25 March 2025

Appearances and goals by national team and year
National team	Year	Apps	Goals
Zambia	2019	3	1
Zambia	2020	4	0
Zambia	2021	4	0
Zambia	2022	5	3
Zambia	2023	8	1
Zambia	2024	11	2
Zambia	2025	1	0
Total		36	7

Scores and results list Zambia's goal tally first, score column indicates score after each Kangwa goal.

List of international goals scored by Kings Kangwa
No.	Date	Venue	Opponent	Score	Result	Competition
1	16 July 2019	Stade de Marrakech, Marrakesh, Morocco	Morocco	2–1	3–2	Friendly
2	25 March 2022	Kervansaray Sport Centre - Field 1, Antalya, Turkey	Congo	2–1	3–1	Friendly
3	7 June 2022	National Heroes Stadium, Lusaka, Zambia	Comoros	2–1	2–1	2023 Africa Cup of Nations qualification
4	17 November 2022	HaMoshava Stadium, Petah Tikva, Israel	Israel	1–2	2–4	Friendly
5	17 June 2023	Levy Mwanawasa Stadium, Ndola, Zambia	Ivory Coast	3–0	3–0	2023 Africa Cup of Nations qualification
6	17 January 2024	Laurent Pokou Stadium, San-Pédro, Ivory Coast	DR Congo	1–0	1–1	2023 Africa Cup of Nations
7	10 September 2024	Levy Mwanawasa Stadium, Ndola, Zambia	Sierra Leone	3–2	3–2	2025 Africa Cup of Nations qualification

== Honours ==
Red Star Belgrade

- Serbian SuperLiga: 2022–23
- Serbian Cup: 2022–23

Hapoel Beer Sheva

- Israeli Premier League: 2025–26
- Israel State Cup: 2024–25
- Israel Super Cup: 2025
