= Mzamiru Yassin =

Tanzanian footballer

Personal information
- Full name: Mzamiru Yassin
- Date of birth: 3 January 1996 (age 30)
- Place of birth: Morogoro, Tanzania
- Height: 1.69 m (5 ft 7 in)
- Position: Midfielder

Team information
- Current team: Simba SC
- Number: 19

Senior career*
Years	Team	Apps	(Gls)
2015–2016	Mtibwa Sugar		
2016–	Simba SC		

International career^{‡}
2016–	Tanzania	36	(0)
- * Club domestic league appearances and goals as of 11 October 2020 ‡ National team caps and goals as of 23:20, 10 September 2022 (UTC)

Mzamiru Yassin (born 3 January 1996) is a Tanzanian football player who plays as midfielder for Simba SC and the Tanzania national team.

== International career ==
Yassin debuted with the Tanzania national team in a friendly 3–0 loss to Zimbabwe on 13 November 2016.
