= Lionel Mpasi =

Congolese-French footballer (born 1994)

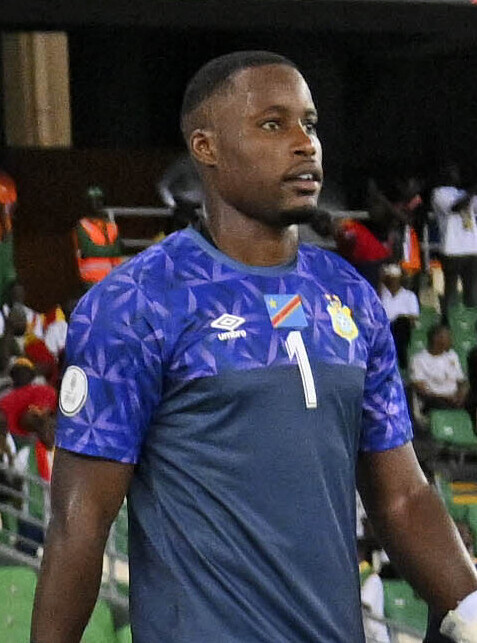
- Mpasi with DR Congo at the 2023 Africa Cup of Nations

Personal information
- Full name: Lionel Mpasi Nzau
- Date of birth: 1 August 1994 (age 32)
- Place of birth: Meaux, France
- Height: 1.82 m (6 ft 0 in)
- Position: Goalkeeper

Team information
- Current team: Le Havre
- Number: 77

Youth career
- 2001–2009: Torcy
- 2009–2011: Paris Saint-Germain

Senior career*
Years	Team	Apps	(Gls)
2011–2012	Paris Saint-Germain II	3	(0)
2012–2016	Toulouse II	23	(0)
2016–2025	Rodez	128	(1)
2018–2020	→ Rodez II (loan)	10	(0)
2025–	Le Havre	6	(0)

International career^{‡}
2010	France U16	2	(0)
2011	France U17	7	(0)
2011	France U18	3	(0)
2022–	DR Congo	33	(0)
- * Club domestic league appearances and goals as of 29 August 2026 ‡ National team caps and goals as of 1 July 2026

Lionel Mpasi Nzau (born 1 August 1994) is a professional footballer who plays as a goalkeeper for Ligue 1 club Le Havre. Born in France, he plays for the DR Congo national team.

== Early life ==
Mpasi was born in Meaux, in the eastern suburbs of Paris, to Congolese parents. He acquired French nationality on 31 August 2000, through the collective effect of his father's naturalization.

== Club career ==
A youth product of PSG, Mpasi signed his first professional contract with Toulouse before moving to Rodez in 2016. Mpasi made his professional debut with Rodez in a 0–0 Ligue 2 tie with Le Mans FC on 14 February 2020.

On 13 July 2025, he signed a two-year contract with Le Havre, a Ligue 1 club, as the second-choice goalkeeper behind Mory Diaw, his former youth teammate at Paris Saint-Germain.

On 18 January 2026, he made his debut for Le Havre in a Ligue 1 match against Rennes on Matchday 18 of the season. The match ended in a 1–1 draw.

== International career ==
Mpasi is a former youth international for France. However, he decided to represent the home country of his parents, DR Congo. Being selected without appearing on the pitch, he finally debuted for the DR Congo national team in a 1–0 friendly loss to Bahrain on 1 February 2022.

On 27 December 2023, he was selected from the list of 24 Congolese players selected by Sébastien Desabre to participate in the 2023 Africa Cup of Nations. As a full goalkeeper, he contested the three first-round matches, all ended in a tie against Zambia 1–1 and Morocco 1–1 and Tanzania 0–0, respectively. In the eighth final, against the Egypt team, with the game ending in a 1–1 draw, he scored the last shot at the goal in a sudden death penalty shootout after the opposing goalkeeper Gabaski sent his shot over the bar, giving Congo the win 8–7 on penalties.

On 19 May 2026, he was included in the 26-man squad selected by head coach Sébastien Desabre to represent the DR Congo at the 2026 FIFA World Cup. Mpasi went on to start four games before DR Congo were knocked out by England in the round of 32. During the group-stage, Mpasi conceded one goal to Portugal, but made eight saves and conceded one goal in the next match against Colombia. He made one save and conceded one goal during the match with Uzbekistan. When DR Congo faced England after reaching the round of 32 for the first time, Mpasi made multiple saves, including two against Jude Bellingham. However, Harry Kane scored two goals past Mpasi late in the match, resulting in England's victory.

It was reported by The Athletic in October 2026 that Mpasi had been found ineligible to play at the World Cup by FIFA, but they allowed him to compete anyway.

== Career statistics ==
=== Club ===
As of match played 29 August 2026

Appearances and goals by club, season and competition
Club	Season	League			National cup (Note: Includes Belgian Cup, FA Cup, Taça de Portugal, Coupe de France)		League cup		Continental		Other		Total	
Club	Season	Division	Apps	Goals	Apps	Goals	Apps	Goals	Apps	Goals	Apps	Goals	Apps	Goals
PSG II	2010–11	CFA	0	0	—		—		—		—		0	0
PSG II	2011–12	CFA	3	0	—		—		—		—		3	0
PSG II	Total		3	0	—		—		—		—		3	0
Toulouse II	2012–13	CFA 2	6	0	—		—		—		—		6	0
Toulouse II	2013–14	CFA 2	5	0	—		—		—		—		5	0
Toulouse II	2014–15	CFA 2	12	0	—		—		—		—		12	0
Toulouse II	Total		23	0	—		—		—		—		23	0
Rodez	2016–17	CFA	1	0	—		—		—		—		1	0
Rodez	2017–18	National	1	0	4	0	—		—		—		5	0
Rodez	2018–19	National	2	0	2	0	—		—		—		4	0
Rodez	2019–20	Ligue 2	1	0	3	0	0	0	—		—		4	0
Rodez	2020–21	Ligue 2	21	0	0	0	—		—		—		21	0
Rodez	2021–22	Ligue 2	37	0	0	0	—		—		—		37	0
Rodez	2022–23	Ligue 2	27	0	0	0	—		—		—		27	0
Rodez	2023–24	Ligue 2	18	0	0	0	—		—		—		18	0
Rodez	2024–25	Ligue 2	20	1	0	0	—		—		—		20	1
Rodez	Total		128	1	9	0	0	0	—		—		137	1
Rodez II (loan)	2018–19	National 3	7	0	—		—		—		—		7	0
Rodez II (loan)	2019–20	National 3	2	0	—		—		—		—		2	0
Rodez II (loan)	2020–21	National 3	1	0	—		—		—		—		1	0
Rodez II (loan)	Total		10	0	—		—		—		—		10	0
Le Havre	2025–26	Ligue 1	4	0	0	0	—		—		—		4	0
Le Havre	2026–27	Ligue 1	2	0	0	0	—		—		—		2	0
Le Havre	Total		6	0	0	0	—		—		—		6	0
Career total			180	1	9	0	0	0	0	0	0	0	189	1

=== International ===
As of match played 1 July 2026

Appearances and goals by national team and year
National team	Year	Apps	Goals
DR Congo	2022	2	0
DR Congo	2023	6	0
DR Congo	2024	9	0
DR Congo	2025	7	0
DR Congo	2026	9	0
Total		33	0
