= Tandi Mwape =

Zambian footballer (born 1996)

Personal information
- Date of birth: 20 July 1996 (age 30)
- Place of birth: Zambia
- Height: 1.80 m (5 ft 11 in)
- Position: Center-back

Team information
- Current team: TP Mazembe
- Number: 3

Senior career*
Years	Team	Apps	(Gls)
2016	Green Eagles		
2017–2019	Kabwe Warriors		
2019–	TP Mazembe	75	(4)

International career^{‡}
2019–	Zambia	14	(1)
- * Club domestic league appearances and goals ‡ National team caps and goals as of 9 October 2021

Tandi Mwape (born 20 July 1996) is a Zambian professional footballer who plays as a defender for Linafoot club TP Mazembe and the Zambia national team.

== Career ==
=== Club ===
After multiple years spent in his native Zambia, Mwape moved to Congolese club TP Mazembe in July 2019. He made his debut for the club just days after his announcement, appearing in a 1–0 defeat to Rayon Sports at the Kagame Interclub Cup.

=== International ===
Mwape made his senior international debut on 2 June 2019 in a penalty victory over Malawi at the COSAFA Cup.

== Career statistics ==
=== International ===
As of matches played 7 October 2021.

National team	Year	Apps	Goals
Zambia	2019	6	0
Zambia	2020	4	0
Zambia	2021	4	1
Total		14	1

=== International goals ===
Scores and results list Zambia's goal tally first.

No.	Date	Venue	Opponent	Score	Result	Competition
1.	8 June 2021	Stade de l'Amitié, Cotonou, Benin	Benin	2–1	2–2	Friendly
