= Lusajo Mwaikenda =

Tanzanian footballer (born 2000)

Personal information
- Full name: Lusajo Elukaga Mwaikenda
- Date of birth: 27 October 2000 (age 26)
- Place of birth: Kyela, Tanzania
- Height: 1.74 m (5 ft 9 in)
- Position: Centre-back

Team information
- Current team: Azam
- Number: 5

Senior career*
Years	Team	Apps	(Gls)
2019–	Azam		
2020–2021	→KMC (loan)		

International career^{‡}
2022–	Tanzania	23	(1)
- * Club domestic league appearances and goals as of 23:55, 21 December 2025 (UTC) ‡ National team caps and goals as of 23:55, 21 December 2025 (UTC)

Lusajo Elukaga Mwaikenda (born 27 October 2000) is a Tanzanian professional footballer who plays as a centre-back for Tanzanian Premier League club Azam and the Tanzania national team.

== Club career ==
Mwaikenda began his senior career with Tanzanian Premier League club Azam in 2019, and in 2020 had a year-long stint with KMC. He returned to Azam the following season, where he became a stalwart player and then captain.

== International career ==
Mwaikenda made the senior Tanzania national team for the 2023 Africa Cup of Nations. The following year he was called up to the 2024 African Nations Championship. He returned to the national team for the 2025 Africa Cup of Nations where he was named captain.
