= Henock Inonga Baka =

DR Congolese footballer (born 1993)

Personal information
- Full name: Henock Varane Inonga Baka
- Date of birth: 1 November 1993 (age 33)
- Place of birth: Kinshasa, DR Congo
- Height: 1.80 m (5 ft 11 in)
- Position: Centre-back

Team information
- Current team: Al Zawraa SC
- Number: 29

Youth career
- As Dibumba De Tshikapa

Senior career*
Years	Team	Apps	(Gls)
2016–2018	Renaissance	61	(3)
2018–2021	DCMP loan from FC Renaissance du Congo	42	(1)
2021–2024	Simba	103	(2)
2024–2025	AS FAR	6	(0)
2025	Kuwait SC	0	(0)
2026–	Al Zawraa SC	16	(0)

International career^{‡}
2021–	DR Congo	28	(0)
- * Club domestic league appearances and goals as of 12:05, 22 July 2026 (UTC) ‡ National team caps and goals as of 21:37, 25 March 2026 (UTC)

Henock Varane Inonga Baka (born 1 November 1993) is a Congolese professional footballer who plays as a centre-back for AS FAR and the DR Congo national team.

== Career ==
Inonga Baka began his senior career with the Congolese club Renaissance in the Linafoot in 2016, and became their captain in 2017. In 2018, he transferred to DCMP and helped them win the 2021 Coupe du Congo. On 15 August 2021, he moved to the Tanzanian club Simba S.C. He helped Simba win the 2023 Tanzania Community Shield and 2022 Mapinduzi Cup where he was the man of the match in the final.

== International ==
Inonga Baka was first called up to the DR Congo national team for the 2020 African Nations Championship. He was called up to the national team for the 2023 Africa Cup of Nations.

== Career statistics ==
=== International ===
As of match played 25 March 2026

Appearances and goals by national team and year
National team	Year	Apps	Goals
DR Congo	2021	6	0
DR Congo	2022	2	0
DR Congo	2023	5	0
DR Congo	2024	14	0
DR Congo	2026	1	0
Total		28	0

== Honours ==
DCMP

- Coupe du Congo: 2021

Simba

- Tanzania Community Shield: 2023

Individual

- Tanzanian Premier League Best defender: 2021–22
- Tanzanian Premier League team of the season: 2021–22, 2022–23
