= Sébastien Desabre =

French football manager (born 1976)

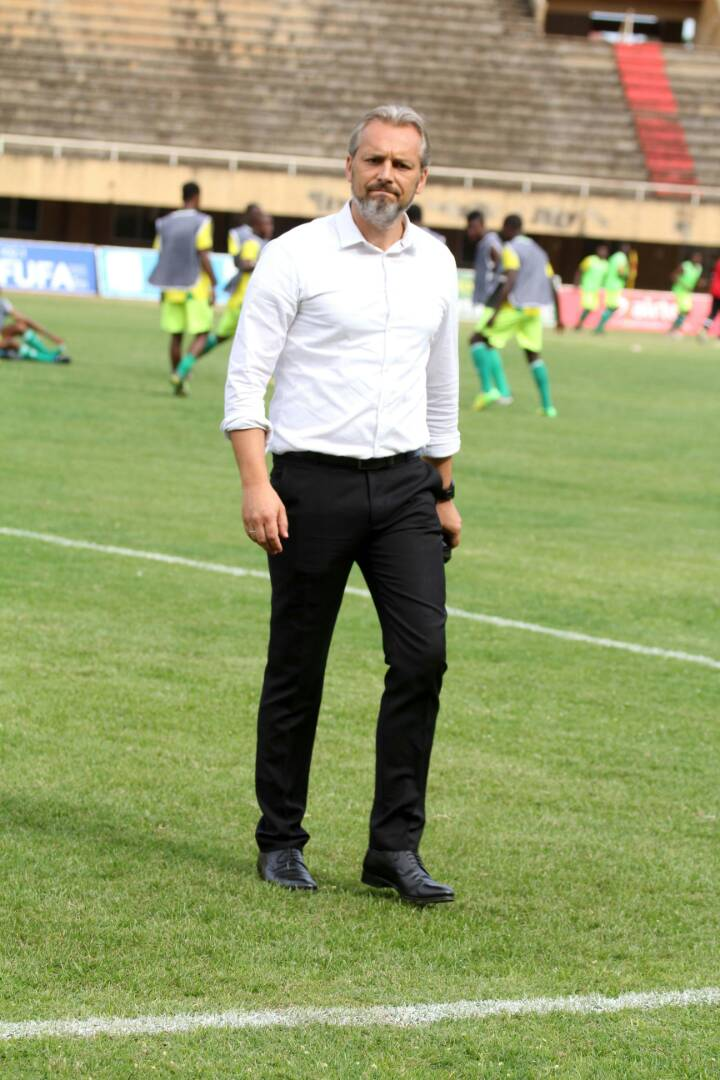
- Desabre as DR Congo national team manager in 2022

Personal information
- Full name: Sébastien Serge Louis Desabre
- Date of birth: 2 August 1976 (age 50)
- Place of birth: Valence, France

Team information
- Current team: DR Congo (head coach)

Managerial career
- Years: Team
- 2006–2010: Cannet Rocheville
- 2010–2012: ASEC Mimosas
- 2012–2013: Coton Sport
- 2013–2014: Espérance de Tunis
- 2014: Espérance de Tunis
- 2015: Recreativo do Libolo
- 2015–2016: Dubai Club
- 2016: JS Saoura
- 2016–2017: Wydad AC
- 2017: Ismaily SC
- 2017–2019: Uganda
- 2019: Pyramids
- 2020: Wydad AC
- 2020–2022: Chamois Niortais
- 2022–: DR Congo

Sébastien Serge Louis Desabre (French pronunciation: [sebastjɛ̃ dəsabʁ]; born 2 August 1976) is a French professional football manager who is head coach of the DR Congo national team.

Nicknamed "The Florist" he has also served as manager of the Uganda national team from 2017 until 2019.

== Early life ==
Desabre was born in Valence.

== Managerial career ==
Desabre coached amateur teams, achieving several promotions. He then coached Cannet Rocheville in the south of France.

At age 34 he moved to coach in Africa. He coached ASEC Mimosas, Coton Sport and Espérance de Tunis. He was also head coach of Ismaily SC in the Egyptian Premier League. He later coached Recreativo do Libolo, Dubai Club, JS Saoura and Wydad AC.

In December 2017, prior to the 2018 African Nations Championship, he signed a multiple-year contract to manage the Uganda national team. He replaced Milutin Sredojević, who left in July 2017 to become coach of the Orlando Pirates. In November 2018, the Uganda was nominated with five others for the CAF Men's national team of the year award 2018.

On 17 November 2018, the Cranes qualified for the 2019 Africa Cup of Nations after defeating Cape Verde. The team advanced out of Group A to the Round of 16, in second position, behind group leader and tournament hosts, Egypt. However, the team was eliminated after losing 1–0 to Senegal on 5 July 2019. The following day, Desabre's contract with the Cranes was terminated by mutual consent despite the success.

On 8 July 2019, Desabre was announced as the new head coach of the Egyptian Premier League club Pyramids. On 19 January 2020, Desabre rejoined Wydad AC.

=== DR Congo ===
In 2022, he was appointed coach of DR Congo national team, replacing the Argentine Héctor Cúper, after DR Congo failed to qualify for the 2022 FIFA World Cup. His contract was signed for four years, with the aim of guiding DR Congo to the 2026 FIFA World Cup. During the 2026 World Cup qualification, DR Congo defeated both Cameroon and Nigeria in the second round, before achieving a 1–0 extra-time win over Jamaica in the inter-confederation play-offs to secure their second World Cup appearance after 1974.

== Personal life ==
Desabre is married and has two sons.

== Managerial statistics ==
As of match played 17 November 2026

Managerial record by team and tenure
Team	Nat.	From	To	Record					Ref.
Team	Nat.	From	To	G	W	D	L	Win %	Ref.
ES Cannet	(France)	1 July 2006	24 October 2010	112	50	29	33	44.64	
ASEC Mimosas	(Ivory Coast)	24 October 2010	5 October 2012	62	28	21	13	45.16	
Coton Sport	(Cameroon)	19 October 2012	4 November 2013	40	18	14	8	45.00	
Esperance (caretaker)	(Tunisia)	3 December 2013	16 September 2014	13	6	4	3	46.15	
Libolo	(Angola)	6 January 2015	4 October 2015	17	9	6	2	52.94	
JS Saoura	(Algeria)	1 July 2016	31 August 2016	2	1	0	1	50.00	
Wydad AC	(Morocco)	17 October 2016	6 January 2017	16	9	6	1	56.25	
Ismaily	(Egypt)	11 July 2017	27 December 2017	18	13	4	1	72.22	
Uganda	(Uganda)	28 December 2017	6 July 2019	21	6	6	9	28.57	
Pyramids	(Egypt)	7 July 2019	18 December 2019	25	16	6	3	64.00	
Wydad AC	(Morocco)	20 January 2020	25 February 2020	7	3	1	3	42.86	
Chamois Niort	(France)	16 June 2020	7 August 2022	81	23	24	34	28.40	
DR Congo	(Democratic Republic of the Congo)	22 August 2022	Present	58	29	16	13	50.00	
Career Total				472	211	137	124	44.70	

== Honours ==
ES Cannet-Rocheville

- Régional 2 Group B: 2006–07
- Division d'Honneur Méditerranée: 2007–08

ASEC Mimosas

- Coupe de Côte d'Ivoire: 2011
- Coupe Houphouët-Boigny: 2012

Coton Sport

- Elite One: 2013

Espérance de Tunis

- Tunisian Ligue Professionnelle 1: 2013–14

Recreativo do Libolo

- Girabola: 2015

DR Congo

- African Cup of Nations: 4th place, 2023
