= Laurent Pokou Stadium =

Stadium in San Pedro, Ivory Coast

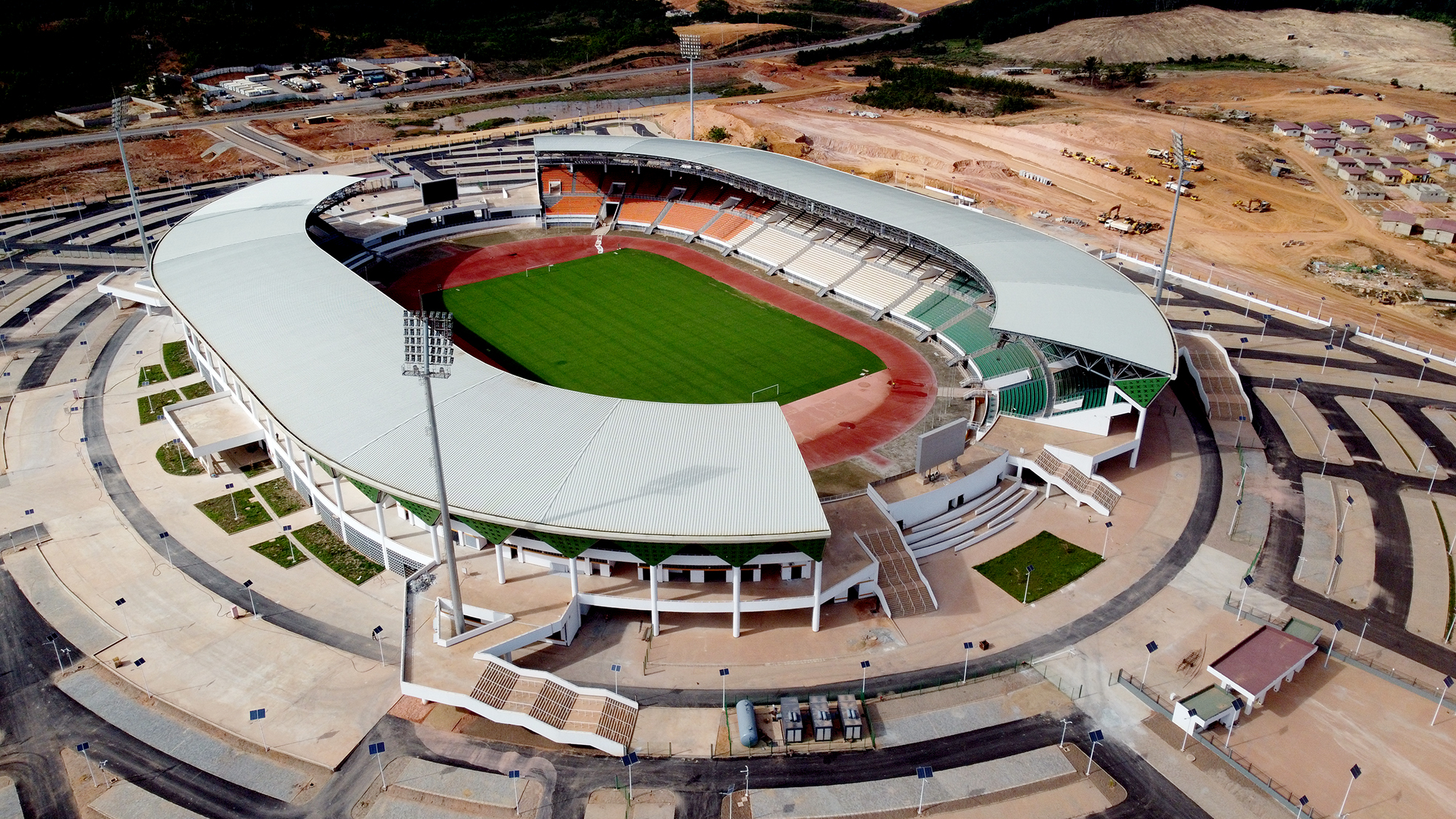
- Interactive map of Laurent Pokou Stadium
- Location: San Pédro, Ivory Coast
- Coordinates: 4°49′1″N 6°37′46″W
- Owner: Government of Ivory Coast
- Capacity: 20,000
- Surface: GrassMaster
- Field size: 105m x 68m

Construction
- Groundbreaking: September 2018
- Opened: 9 September 2023
- General contractor: China Civil Engineering Construction Corporation

Tenants
- FC San Pédro (2024–present); Ivory Coast national football team (selected matches)

Laurent Pokou Stadium is a football stadium in San Pédro, Ivory Coast. The stadium has a capacity of 20,000 seats. The construction of the stadium began in early September 2018 and finished five years later, in early September 2023. The stadium hosted matches for the 2023 Africa Cup of Nations, an international men's football competition between African countries.

== Construction ==
The groundbreaking ceremony for the stadium, attended by CCECC and Minister of Sport Claude Paulin Danho, took place on February 23, 2019. The stadium was specifically designed and constructed for the 2023 Africa Cup of Nations from the project's inception.

During the COVID-19 pandemic, CCECC implemented comprehensive safety protocols, including disinfection, mask distribution, and other preventive measures, to protect the health of construction workers and ensure the uninterrupted progress of the project.

The stadium was officially inaugurated on September 8, 2023. The inauguration ceremony was led by the Paulin Danho, and was attended by the Chinese ambassador, representatives from the construction companies, members of the Laurent Pokou family, the organizing committee of the 2023 Africa Cup of Nations, and other senior officials.

== Match ==
=== First official match ===
On 9 September 2023, the Stadium witnessed its inaugural official match as the Ivory Coast secured a 1–0 victory over Lesotho in a 2023 Africa Cup of Nations qualifier. This stadium, which pays homage to the legendary Ivorian striker, Laurent Pokou (1947–2016), boasts a seating capacity of 20,000. It was Nottingham Forest midfielder Ibrahim Sangaré who had the honor of scoring the first-ever goal at this state-of-the-art facility on that memorable Saturday. Idriss Yacine Diallo, the COCAN Vice-president and FIF President, expressed his thoughts, saying, "The Ivorian authorities have devoted significant efforts to guarantee optimal conditions for the teams participating in the final phase of the competition in Ivory Coast. We've made multiple visits to San Pedro with CAF delegations to oversee the progress of the construction. It brings us immense pride to return to this splendid stadium, which hosted Lesotho so successfully last Saturday."

=== 2023 Africa Cup of Nations ===
The stadium was one of the venues for the 2023 Africa Cup of Nations.

The following matches were played at the stadium:

Date	Time (GMT)	Team #1	Result	Team #2	Round	Spectators
17 January 2024	17:00	Morocco	3–0	Tanzania	Group F	15,478
17 January 2024	20:00	DR Congo	1–1	Zambia	Group F	15,478
21 January 2024	14:00	Morocco	1–1	DR Congo	Group F	13,342
21 January 2024	17:00	Zambia	1–1	Tanzania	Group F	13,342
24 January 2024	17:00	Namibia	0–0	Mali	Group E	15,231
24 January 2024	20:00	Zambia	0–1	Morocco	Group F	15,231
28 January 2024	20:00	Egypt	1–1 (a.e.t.) (7–8 p)	DR Congo	Round of 16	12,342
30 January 2024	20:00	Morocco	0–2	South Africa	Round of 16	19,078

== See also ==
- List of football stadiums in Ivory Coast
- List of African stadiums by capacity
- List of association football stadiums by capacity
