= Keister =

Keister (or Kiester) may refer to:

== Keister ==
=== People ===
Individuals

- Abraham Lincoln Keister (1852-1917), Republican member of the U.S. House
- Bill Keister (1871-1924), American baseball player
- George Keister was an American architect
- John Keister (comedian) (born 1956), American comedian and writer
- John Keister (footballer born 1970), Sierra Leonean international footballer currently playing for Margate
- John Keister (footballer born 1988), Sierra Leonean footballer currently at PK-37
- Shane Keister is an American musician.

=== Groups ===
- Keister Family Fiddlers - A musical group in Chestermere, Alberta, Canada

=== Places ===
- Keister, West Virginia, an unincorporated community

==== Buildings ====
- Keister House, a house on the U.S. National Register of Historic Places Virginia

== Kiester ==
=== Places ===
- Kiester Township, Faribault County, Minnesota, USA
- Kiester Lake (Minnesota, USA)
- Kiester, Minnesota, USA; a city in Faribault County

== Other uses ==
- An alternative term for buttocks

== See also ==
- John Keister (disambiguation)
