= Ivory Coast national football team results (2020–present) =

This article provides details of international football games played by the Ivory Coast national football team from 2020 to present.

== Results ==
Key
Win
Draw
Defeat

=== 2020 ===
31 March 2020 Friendly	Japan	Cancelled	Ivory Coast	Niigata, Japan

8 October 2020 Friendly	Belgium	1–1	Ivory Coast	Brussels, Belgium
20:45 UTC+2	Batshuayi 53'	Report	Kessié 87' (pen.)	Stadium: King Baudouin Stadium; Referee: Serdar Gözübüyük (Netherlands)

13 October 2020 Friendly	Japan	1–0	Ivory Coast	Utrecht, Netherlands
16:45 UTC+2	Ueda 90+1'	Report		Stadium: Stadion Galgenwaard; Referee: Jochem Kamphuis (Netherlands)

12 November 2020 2021 AFCON qualification	Ivory Coast	2–1	Madagascar	Abidjan, Ivory Coast
19:00 UTC+0	Gervinho 48'; Haller 55'	Report	Voavy 59'	Stadium: Stade Olympique Alassane Ouattara; Referee: Haythem Guirat (Tunisia)

17 November 2020 2021 AFCON qualification	Madagascar	1–1	Ivory Coast	Toamasina, Madagascar
20:00 UTC+3	Amada 51'	Report	Kessié 15' (pen.)	Stadium: Barikadimy Stadium; Referee: Gehad Grisha (Egypt)

=== 2021 ===
26 March 2021 2021 AFCON qualification	Niger	0–3	Ivory Coast	Niamey, Niger
16:00 UTC+0		Report	Aurier 25'; Gradel 34'; Kanon 60'	Stadium: Stade Général Seyni Kountché; Referee: Beida Dahane (Mauritania)

30 March 2021 2021 AFCON qualification	Ivory Coast	3–1	Ethiopia	Abidjan, Ivory Coast
13:00 UTC+0	Boly 3'; Kessié 19' (pen.); Kouassi 76'	Report	Kebede 74'	Stadium: Stade Olympique Alassane Ouattara; Referee: Charles Bulu (Ghana)

5 June 2021 Friendly	Ivory Coast	2–1	Burkina Faso	Abidjan, Ivory Coast
17:00 UTC+0	Sangaré 72'; Amad 90+7'	Report	L. Traoré 16'	Stadium: Stade Olympique Alassane Ouattara; Referee: Yelebodom Bodjona (Togo)

12 June 2021 Friendly	Ghana	0–0	Ivory Coast	Cape Coast, Ghana
17:00 UTC+0		Report		Stadium: Cape Coast Sports Stadium; Referee: Daouda Guèye (Senegal)

3 September 2021 2022 World Cup qualification	Mozambique	0–0	Ivory Coast	Maputo, Mozambique
15:00 UTC+2		Report		Stadium: Estádio Nacional do Zimpeto; Referee: Pacifique Ndabihawenimana (Burundi)

6 September 2021 2022 World Cup qualification	Ivory Coast	2–1	Cameroon	Abidjan, Ivory Coast
19:00 UTC+0	Haller 20' (pen.), 29'	Report	Ngamaleu 61' (pen.)	Stadium: Stade Olympique Alassane Ouattara; Referee: Mehdi Abid Charef (Algeria)

8 October 2021 2022 World Cup qualification	Malawi	0–3	Ivory Coast	Johannesburg, South Africa
15:00 UTC+2		Report	Gradel 36'; I. Sangaré 85'; Boga 90+5'	Stadium: Orlando Stadium; Referee: Peter Waweru (Kenya)

11 October 2021 2022 World Cup qualification	Ivory Coast	2–1	Malawi	Cotonou, Benin
17:00 UTC+1	Pépé 2'; Kessié 66' (pen.)	Report	Muyaba 20'	Stadium: Stade de l'Amitié; Referee: Bernard Camille (Seychelles)

13 November 2021 2022 World Cup qualification	Ivory Coast	3–0	Mozambique	Cotonou, Benin
20:00 UTC+1	Gradel 10'; Cornet 61'; Seri 90'	Report		Stadium: Stade de l'Amitié; Referee: Ahmed El Ghandour (Egypt)

16 November 2021 2022 World Cup qualification	Cameroon	1–0	Ivory Coast	Douala, Cameroon
20:00 UTC+1	Toko Ekambi 21'	Report		Stadium: Japoma Stadium; Referee: Janny Sikazwe (Zambia)

=== 2022 ===
12 January 2022 2021 AFCON GS	Equatorial Guinea	0–1	Ivory Coast	Douala, Cameroon
20:00 UTC+1		Report	Gradel 5'	Stadium: Japoma Stadium; Referee: Rédouane Jiyed (Morocco)

16 January 2022 2021 AFCON GS	Ivory Coast	2–2	Sierra Leone	Douala, Cameroon
17:00 UTC+1	Haller 25'; Pépé 65'	Report	M. Kamara 55'; A. Kamara 90+3'	Stadium: Japoma Stadium; Referee: Maguette N'Diaye (Senegal)

20 January 2022 2021 AFCON GS	Ivory Coast	3–1	Algeria	Douala, Cameroon
17:00 UTC+1	Kessié 22'; I. Sangaré 39'; Pépé 54'	Report	Bendebka 73'	Stadium: Japoma Stadium; Referee: Victor Gomes (South Africa)

26 January 2022 2021 AFCON R16	Ivory Coast	0–0 (a.e.t.) (4–5 p)	Egypt	Douala, Cameroon
17:00 UTC+1		Report		Stadium: Japoma Stadium; Referee: Jean-Jacques Ndala (DR Congo)
	Penalties
	Pépé (penalty scored); Sangaré (penalty scored); Bailly (penalty missed); Cornet (penalty scored); Zaha (penalty scored)		(penalty scored) Zizo; (penalty scored) El Solia; (penalty scored) Kamal; (penalty scored) Abdel Monem; (penalty scored) Salah

25 March 2022 Friendly	France	2–1	Ivory Coast	Marseille, France
21:15 UTC+1	Giroud 22'; Tchouaméni 90+3'	Report	Pépé 19'	Stadium: Stade Vélodrome; Referee: Vítor Ferreira (Portugal)

29 March 2022 Friendly	England	3–0	Ivory Coast	London, England
19:45 UTC+1	Watkins 30'; Sterling 45'; Mings 90+3'	Report		Stadium: Wembley Stadium; Attendance: 73,405; Referee: Erik Lambrechts (Belgium)

3 June 2022 2023 AFCON qualification	Ivory Coast	3–1	Zambia	Yamoussoukro, Ivory Coast
19:00 UTC+0	Aurier 67'; Kouamé 76'; Sangaré 89'	Report	Daka 90+4'	Stadium: Stade de Yamoussoukro; Referee: Dahane Beida (Mauritania)

9 June 2022 2023 AFCON qualification	Lesotho	0–0	Ivory Coast	Johannesburg, South Africa
19:00 UTC+2		Report		Stadium: Dobsonville Stadium; Referee: Patrice Milazare (Mauritius)

24 September 2022 Friendly	Ivory Coast	2–1	Togo	Le Petit-Quevilly, France
18:00 UTC+2	Fofana 60'; Kessié 68' (pen.)	Report	Dermane 85'	Stadium: Stade Robert Diochon; Referee: Aurélien Petit (France)

27 September 2022 Friendly	Ivory Coast	3–1	Guinea	Amiens, France
20:00 UTC+2	Sangaré 30'; Doumbia 41'; Fofana 45+1'	Report	Diakhaby 52'	Stadium: Stade de la Licorne; Referee: Thomas Léonard (France)

=== 2023 ===
24 March 2023 2023 AFCON qualification	Ivory Coast	3–1	Comoros	Bouaké, Ivory Coast
17:00 UTC+0	Kouamé 29'; Haller 61'; Krasso 89'	Report	Djoudja Yussuf 90+3'	Stadium: Stade Bouaké; Referee: Abdel Aziz Mohamed Bouh (Mauritania)

28 March 2023 2023 AFCON qualification	Comoros	0–2	Ivory Coast	Moroni, Comoros
15:00 UTC+3		Report	I. Sangaré 36'; Kessié 58'	Stadium: Stade Omnisports de Malouzini; Referee: Peter Waweru (Kenya)

17 June 2023 2023 AFCON qualification	Zambia	3–0	Ivory Coast	Ndola, Zambia
15:00 UTC+2	Aurier 31' (o.g.); Daka 48'; Kangwa 55'	Report		Stadium: Levy Mwanawasa Stadium; Referee: Bamlak Tessema Weyesa (Ethiopia)

9 September 2023 2023 AFCON qualification	Ivory Coast	1–0	Lesotho	San-Pédro, Ivory Coast
16:00 UTC+0	I. Sangaré 16'	Report		Stadium: Laurent Pokou Stadium; Referee: Samuel Uwikunda (Rwanda)

14 October 2023 Friendly	Ivory Coast	1–1	Morocco	Abidjan, Ivory Coast
	Haller 45+3'	Report	Kaabi 81'	Stadium: Felix Houphouet Boigny Stadium

17 October 2023 Friendly	Ivory Coast	1–1	South Africa	Abidjan, Ivory Coast
		Report		Stadium: Felix Houphouet Boigny Stadium; Referee: Benoit Badot (Burkina Faso)

17 November 2023 2026 World Cup qualification	Ivory Coast	9–0	Seychelles	Abidjan, Ivory Coast
19:00 UTC+0	Haller 20' (pen.); I. Sangaré 24'; Adingra 36'; Konaté 40' (pen.), 90+5'; S. Fofana 60'; H. Traorè 77', 90+4'; Krasso 84' (pen.)	Report		Stadium: Stade Olympique d'Ebimpé; Referee: Adalbert Diouf (Senegal)

20 November 2023 2026 World Cup qualification	Gambia	0–2	Ivory Coast	Dar es Salaam, Tanzania
17:00 UTC+3		Report	Kouamé 45'; S. Fofana 85'	Stadium: Benjamin Mkapa (National Stadium); Referee: Jalal Jayed (Morocco)

=== 2024 ===
6 January 2024 Friendly	Ivory Coast	5–1	Sierra Leone	San Pedro, Ivory Coast
17:00 UTC+0}	O. Diomande 18'; Kessié 36'; Bamba 38'; Boga 48'; Lazare 84'	Report	Michael 86'	Stadium: Laurent Pokou Stadium; Referee: Dedjinnanchi Ahomlanto (Benin)

13 January 2024 2023 AFCON GS	Ivory Coast	2–0	Guinea-Bissau	Abidjan, Ivory Coast
20:00	Fofana 4'; Krasso 58'	Report		Stadium: Alassane Ouattara Stadium; Attendance: 36,858; Referee: Amin Omar (Egypt)

18 January 2024 2023 AFCON GS	Ivory Coast	0–1	Nigeria	Abidjan, Ivory Coast
17:00		Report	Troost-Ekong 55' (pen.)	Stadium: Alassane Ouattara Stadium; Attendance: 49,517; Referee: Mustapha Ghorbal (Algeria)

22 January 2024 2023 AFCON GS	Equatorial Guinea	4–0	Ivory Coast	Abidjan, Ivory Coast
17:00	Nsue 42', 75'; Ganet 73'; Buyla 88'	Report		Stadium: Alassane Ouattara Stadium; Attendance: 42,550; Referee: Mahmood Ismail (Sudan)

29 January 2024 2023 AFCON R16	Senegal	1–1 (a.e.t.) (4–5 p)	Ivory Coast	Yamoussoukro, Ivory Coast
	Diallo 4'	Report	Kessié 86' (pen.)	Stadium: Charles Konan Banny Stadium; Attendance: 19,948; Referee: Pierre Atcho (Gabon)
	Penalties
	Koulibaly (penalty scored); P. Sarr (penalty scored); Niakhate (penalty missed); Dieng (penalty scored); Mane (penalty scored)		Pépé (penalty scored); Kouamé (penalty scored); Haller (penalty scored); Aurier (penalty scored); Kessié (penalty scored)

3 February 2024 2023 AFCON QF	Mali	1–2 (a.e.t.)	Ivory Coast	Bouaké, Ivory Coast
17:00 UTC+0}	Nene 71'	Report	Adingra 90'; Diakité 120+2'	Stadium: Stade de la Paix; Attendance: 39,836; Referee: Mohamed Adel (Egypt)

7 February 2024 2023 AFCON SF	Ivory Coast	1–0	DR Congo	Abidjan, Ivory Coast
20:00 UTC+0}	Haller 65'	Report		Stadium: Alassane Ouattara Stadium; Attendance: 51,020; Referee: Mutaz Ibrahim (Libya)

11 February 2024 2023 AFCON F	Nigeria	1–2	Ivory Coast	Abidjan, Ivory Coast
20:00 UTC+0}	Troost-Ekong 38'	Report	Kessié 62'; Haller 81'	Stadium: Alassane Ouattara Stadium; Attendance: 57,094; Referee: Dahane Beida (Mauritania)

26 March 2024 Friendly	Ivory Coast	2–1	Uruguay	Lens, France
20:30 UTC+1	M. Olivera 10' (o.g.); Doué 85'	Report	Viñas 77'	Stadium: Stade Bollaert-Delelis; Referee: Ruddy Buquet (France)

7 June 2024 2026 World Cup qualification	Ivory Coast	1–0	Gabon	Korhogo, Ivory Coast
19:00 UTC+0}	Fofana 36'	Report		Stadium: Amadou Gon Coulibaly Stadium; Attendance: 17,522; Referee: Omar Artan (Somalia)

10 June 2024 2026 World Cup qualification	Kenya	0–0	Ivory Coast	Lilongwe, Malawi
		Report		Stadium: Bingu National Stadium; Referee: Jalal Jayed (Morocco)

6 September 2024 2025 AFCON qualification	Ivory Coast	2–0	Zambia	Bouaké, Ivory Coast
19:00 UTC+0	Krasso 73', 84'	Report		Stadium: Stade de la Paix; Referee: Mustapha Ghorbal (Algeria)

10 September 2024 2025 AFCON qualification	Chad	0–2	Ivory Coast	Yaoundé, Cameroon
20:00 UTC+1		Report	Krasso 45+3'; Diakité 55'	Stadium: Ahmadou Ahidjo Stadium; Referee: Tsegay Mogos Teklu (Eritrea)

11 October 2024 2025 AFCON qualification	Ivory Coast	4–1	Sierra Leone	San-Pédro, Ivory Coast
--:--	Pépé 3'; Kessié 51', 76' (pen.); Diakité 87' (pen.)	Report	Koroma 43'	Stadium: Laurent Pokou Stadium; Attendance: 16,553; Referee: Abongile Tom (South Africa)

15 October 2024 2025 AFCON qualification	Sierra Leone	1–0	Ivory Coast	Monrovia, Liberia
16:00 UTC+0	Bakayoko 85'	Report		Stadium: Samuel Kanyon Doe Sports Complex; Attendance: 7,408; Referee: Jeannot Franck Bito (Cameroon)

15 November 2024 2025 AFCON qualification	Zambia	1–0	Ivory Coast	Ndola, Zambia
--:--	K. Musonda 43'	Report		Stadium: Levy Mwanawasa Stadium; Attendance: 49,800; Referee: Omar Artan (Somalia)

19 November 2024 2025 AFCON qualification	Ivory Coast	4–0	Chad	Abidjan, Ivory Coast
15:00 UTC+0	Bayo 25'; Adingra 37'; Agbadou 77'; Diakité 90+3'	Report		Stadium: Felix Houphouet Boigny Stadium; Referee: Sadok Selmi (Tunisia)

22 December 2024 2024 CHAN qualification	Ivory Coast	2–0	Burkina Faso	Abidjan, Ivory Coast
16:00 UTC+0	Konaté 16', 52'	Report		Stadium: Felix Houphouet Boigny Stadium; Referee: Dedjinnanchi Tanislas Ahomlanto (Benin)

28 December 2024 2024 CHAN qualification	Burkina Faso	2–0 (2–2 agg.) (4–2 p)	Ivory Coast	Bamako, Mali
16:00 UTC+0	Traoré 30'; Kanté 53'	Report		Stadium: Stade du 26 Mars; Referee: Dedjinnanchi Tanislas Ahomlanto (Benin)
	Penalties
	Traoré (penalty missed); Guiro (penalty scored); Kanté (penalty scored); Diarra (penalty scored); Malo (penalty scored)		(penalty missed) Kacou; (penalty scored) Britto; (penalty scored) Zouzou; (penalty missed) Konaté

=== 2025 ===
21 March 2025 2026 World Cup qualification	Burundi	0–1	Ivory Coast	Meknes, Morocco
19:00 GMT		Report	Guessand 16'	Stadium: Honneur Stadium; Attendance: 1,500; Referee: Samir Guezzaz (Morocco)

25 March 2025 2026 World Cup qualification	Ivory Coast	1–0	Gambia	Abidjan, Ivory Coast
19:00 GMT	Haller 15'	Report		Stadium: Felix Houphouet Boigny Stadium; Attendance: 19,471; Referee: Ring Nyier Akech Malong (South Sudan)

7 June 2025 2025 Canadian Shield	Ivory Coast	0–1	New Zealand	Toronto, Canada
19:00 UTC−4		Report	Just 41'	Stadium: BMO Field; Referee: Pierre-Luc Lauzière (Canada)

10 June 2025 2025 Canadian Shield	Canada	0–0 (4–5 p)	Ivory Coast	Toronto, Canada
20:30 UTC−4				Stadium: BMO Field; Attendance: 18,489; Referee: Filip Dujic (Canada)
	Penalties
	J. David (penalty scored); Choinière (penalty scored); Cornelius (penalty scored); Oluwaseyi (penalty missed); Koné (penalty scored); De Fougerolles (penalty missed)		(penalty scored) Akpa; (penalty missed) Gbane; (penalty scored) Boga; (penalty scored) Latte Lath; (penalty scored) Kessié; (penalty scored) M. Diomande

5 September 2025 2026 World Cup qualification	Ivory Coast	1–0	Burundi	Abidjan, Ivory Coast
19:00 UTC+0	Bayo 3'	Report (FIFA)		Stadium: Felix Houphouet Boigny Stadium; Referee: Bouchra Karboubi (Morocco)

9 September 2025 2026 World Cup qualification	Gabon	0–0	Ivory Coast	Franceville, Gabon
				Stadium: Stade de Franceville; Referee: Abdelaziz Bouh (Mauritania)

10 October 2025 2026 World Cup qualification	Seychelles	0–7	Ivory Coast	Saint Pierre, Mauritius
17:00 UTC+4		Report	Sangaré 7' (pen.); Agbadou 17'; Diakité 32'; Guessand 39'; Y. Diomande 55'; Adingra 67'; Kessié 90'	Stadium: Côte d'Or National Sports Complex; Referee: Jean Ishimwe (Rwanda)

14 October 2025 2026 World Cup qualification	Ivory Coast	3–0	Kenya	Abidjan, Ivory Coast
19:00 UTC+0	Kessié 7'; Y. Diomande 54'; Amad 84'	Report		Stadium: Alassane Ouattara Stadium; Attendance: 29,714; Referee: Naby Laye Touré (Guinea)

14 November 2025 Friendly	Saudi Arabia	1–0	Ivory Coast	Jeddah, Saudi Arabia
19:30 UTC+3	Abu Al-Shamat 8'	Report		Stadium: Prince Abdullah Al-Faisal Sports City Stadium; Attendance: 2,271; Referee: Yahya Almulla (United Arab Emirates)

18 November 2025 Friendly	Oman	0–2	Ivory Coast	Seeb, Oman
19:00 UTC+4		Report	Bayo 9'; Krasso 25'	Stadium: Al-Seeb Stadium; Referee: Mohammed Khaled Al Hoish (Saudi Arabia)

24 December 2025 2025 AFCON GS	Ivory Coast	1–0	Mozambique	Marrakesh, Morocco
18:30 UTC+1	Amad 49'	Report		Stadium: Marrakesh Stadium; Attendance: 13,041; Referee: Samuel Uwikunda (Rwanda)

28 December 2025 2025 AFCON GS	Ivory Coast	1–1	Cameroon	Marrakesh, Morocco
21:00 UTC+1	Amad 51'	Report	Konan 56' (o.g.)	Stadium: Marrakesh Stadium; Attendance: 35,165; Referee: Mustapha Ghorbal (Algeria)

31 December 2025 2025 AFCON GS	Gabon	2–3	Ivory Coast	Marrakesh, Morocco
20:00 UTC+1	Kanga 11'; Bouanga 21'	Report	Krasso 44'; Guessand 84'; Touré 90+1'	Stadium: Marrakesh Stadium; Attendance: 20,838; Referee: Omar Artan (Somalia)

=== 2026 ===
6 January 2026 2025 AFCON R16	Ivory Coast	3–0	Burkina Faso	Marrakesh, Morocco
20:00 UTC+1	Amad 20'; Y. Diomande 32'; Touré 87'	Report		Stadium: Marrakesh Stadium; Referee: Mahmood Ismail (Sudan)

10 January 2026 2025 AFCON QF	Egypt	3–2	Ivory Coast	Agadir, Morocco
20:00 UTC+1	Marmoush 4'; Rabia 32'; Salah 52'	Report	Abou El Fotouh 40' (o.g.); Doué 73'	Stadium: Adrar Stadium; Attendance: 31,213; Referee: Mustapha Ghorbal (Algeria)

28 March 2026 Friendly	South Korea	0–4	Ivory Coast	Milton Keynes, England
14:00 UTC+0		Report	Guessand 35'; Adingra 45+1'; Godo 62'; Singo 90+3'	Stadium: Stadium MK; Attendance: 5,917; Referee: Ian McNabb (Northern Ireland)

31 March 2026 Friendly	Scotland	0–1	Ivory Coast	Liverpool, England
19:30 UTC+1		Report	Pépé 12'	Stadium: Hill Dickinson Stadium; Attendance: 33,034; Referee: Daniel Elder (Australia)

4 June 2026 Friendly	France	1–2	Ivory Coast	Nantes, France
21:10 UTC+2	Cherki 45'	Report	Doué 53'; Amad 84'	Stadium: Stade de la Beaujoire; Attendance: 35,322; Referee: Sebastian Gishamer (Austria)

8 June 2026 Unofficial friendly	Philadelphia Union II (United States)	0–2	Ivory Coast	Chester, United States
19:00 UTC−7		Report	Guessand 9'; Bonny 40'	Stadium: Subaru Park; Attendance: 18,500

14 June 2026 2026 World Cup GS	Ivory Coast	1–0	Ecuador	Philadelphia, United States
19:00 UTC−4	Amad 90'	Report		Stadium: Lincoln Financial Field; Attendance: 68,274; Referee: François Letexier (France)

20 June 2026 2026 World Cup GS	Germany	2–1	Ivory Coast	Toronto, Canada
16:00 UTC−4	Undav 68', 90+4'	Report	Kessié 30'	Stadium: BMO Field; Attendance: 43,036; Referee: Juan Gabriel Benítez (Paraguay)

25 June 2026 2026 World Cup GS	Curaçao	0–2	Ivory Coast	Philadelphia, United States
16:00 UTC−4		Report	Pépé 7', 64'	Stadium: Lincoln Financial Field; Attendance: 68,324; Referee: Glenn Nyberg (Sweden)

30 June 2026 2026 World Cup R32	Ivory Coast	1–2	Norway	Arlington, United States
13:00 UTC−5	Amad 74'	Report	Nusa 39'; Haaland 86'	Stadium: AT&T Stadium; Attendance: 69,665; Referee: Jesús Valenzuela (Venezuela)
