= 2021 Africa Cup of Nations Group E =

Football tournament group stage

Group E of the 2021 Africa Cup of Nations took place from 11 to 20 January 2022. The group consisted of defending champions Algeria, Equatorial Guinea, the Ivory Coast and Sierra Leone.

The Ivory Coast and Equatorial Guinea advanced to the round of 16.

== Teams ==
Draw position	Team	Zone	Method of qualification	Date of qualification	Finals appearance	Last appearance	Previous best performance	FIFA Rankings	
Draw position	Team	Zone	Method of qualification	Date of qualification	Finals appearance	Last appearance	Previous best performance	May 2021 (Note: The rankings of May 2021 were used for seeding for the final draw.)	December 2021
E1	Algeria	UNAF	Group H winners	16 November 2020	19th	2019	Winners (1990, 2019)	33	29
E2	Ivory Coast	WAFU	Group K winners	26 March 2021	24th	2019	Winners (1992, 2015)	59	56
E3	Sierra Leone	WAFU	Group L runners-up	15 June 2021	3rd	1996	Group stage (1994, 1996)	114	108
E4	Equatorial Guinea	UNIFFAC	Group J runners-up	25 March 2021	3rd	2015	Fourth place (2015)	132	114

== Standings ==
Pos	Team	Pld	W	D	L	GF	GA	GD	Pts	Qualification
1	Ivory Coast	3	2	1	0	6	3	+3	7	Advance to knockout stage
2	Equatorial Guinea	3	2	0	1	2	1	+1	6	Advance to knockout stage
3	Sierra Leone	3	0	2	1	2	3	−1	2	
4	Algeria	3	0	1	2	1	4	−3	1	

Source: CAF
Rules for classification: Group stage tiebreakers

== Matches ==
=== Algeria vs Sierra Leone ===
11 January 2022
14:00

Algeria	0–0	Sierra Leone
	Report

Japoma Stadium, Douala
Referee: Ahmad Imetehaz Heeralall (Mauritius)

Algeria	Sierra Leone

GK	23	Raïs M'Bolhi
RB	20	Youcef Atal
CB	2	Aïssa Mandi
CB	17	Abdelkader Bedrane	(yellow card) 35'	(substituted off) 46'
LB	21	Ramy Bensebaini
DM	12	Haris Belkebla		(substituted off) 84'
RM	7	Riyad Mahrez (c)
CM	10	Sofiane Feghouli		(substituted off) 64'
CM	11	Yacine Brahimi		(substituted off) 65'
LM	8	Youcef Belaïli
CF	13	Islam Slimani		(substituted off) 65'
Substitutions:
DF	4	Djamel Benlamri		(substituted on) 46'
MF	15	Farid Boulaya		(substituted on) 64'
FW	9	Baghdad Bounedjah		(substituted on) 65'
MF	14	Sofiane Bendebka		(substituted on) 65'
FW	27	Saïd Benrahma		(substituted on) 84'
Manager:
Djamel Belmadi

GK	1	Mohamed Kamara
RB	2	Osman Kakay
CB	17	Umaru Bangura (c)	(yellow card) 77'
CB	5	Steven Caulker
LB	3	Kevin Wright
CM	7	Kwame Quee
CM	6	John Kamara
RW	19	Mustapha Bundu
AM	10	Kei Kamara
LW	14	Mohamed Buya Turay		(substituted off) 84'
CF	12	Alhaji Kamara		(substituted off) 76'
Substitutions:
MF	8	Saidu Fofanah		(substituted on) 76'
FW	11	Sullay Kaikai		(substituted on) 84'
Manager:
John Keister

Man of the Match:
Mohamed Kamara (Sierra Leone)

Assistant referees:
Soulaimane Almadine (Kenya)
Lionel Andrianantenaina (Madagascar)
Fourth official:
Pacifique Ndabihawenimana (Burundi)
Video assistant referee:
Adil Zourak (Morocco)
Assistant video assistant referee:
Zakaria Brinsi (Morocco)

=== Equatorial Guinea vs Ivory Coast ===
12 January 2022
20:00

Equatorial Guinea	0–1	Ivory Coast
	Report	Gradel 5'

Japoma Stadium, Douala
Referee: Redouane Jiyed (Morocco)

Equatorial Guinea	Ivory Coast

GK	13	Manuel Sapunga
RB	15	Carlos Akapo		(substituted off) 89'
CB	21	Esteban Obiang
CB	16	Saúl Coco
LB	11	Basilio Ndong
RM	6	Iban Salvador		(substituted off) 82'
CM	22	Pablo Ganet
CM	8	José Machín
LM	14	Jannick Buyla
CF	10	Emilio Nsue (c)
CF	18	Dorian Junior		(substituted off) 64'
Substitutions:
FW	19	Luis Nlavo	(yellow card) 67'	(substituted on) 64'
FW	9	Óscar Siafá		(substituted on) 82'
DF	23	Luis Meseguer		(substituted on) 89'
Assistant manager:
Casto Nopo

GK	23	Badra Ali Sangaré
RB	12	Habib Maïga
CB	21	Eric Bailly
CB	14	Simon Deli
LB	3	Ghislain Konan
CM	18	Ibrahim Sangaré	(yellow card) 31'
CM	4	Jean Michaël Seri
CM	8	Franck Kessié		(substituted off) 71'
RF	15	Max Gradel (c)		(substituted off) 71'
CF	22	Sébastien Haller		(substituted off) 82'
LF	11	Maxwel Cornet		(substituted off) 71'
Substitutions:
MF	20	Serey Dié		(substituted on) 71'
FW	9	Wilfried Zaha		(substituted on) 71'
FW	19	Nicolas Pépé		(substituted on) 71'
FW	24	Christian Kouamé		(substituted on) 82'
Manager:
(France) Patrice Beaumelle

Man of the Match:
Jean Michaël Seri (Ivory Coast)

Assistant referees:
Lahcen Azgaou (Morocco)
Mustapha Akarkad (Morocco)
Fourth official:
Samir Guezzaz (Morocco)
Video assistant referee:
Bouchra Karboubi (Morocco)
Assistant video assistant referee:
Zakaria Brinsi (Morocco)

=== Ivory Coast vs Sierra Leone ===
16 January 2022
17:00

Ivory Coast	2–2	Sierra Leone
Haller 25'; Pépé 65'	Report	Mu. Kamara 55'; A. Kamara 90+3'

Japoma Stadium, Douala
Referee: Maguette N'Diaye (Senegal)

Ivory Coast	Sierra Leone

GK	23	Badra Ali Sangaré
RB	17	Serge Aurier (c)
CB	21	Eric Bailly	(substituted off) 90+3'
CB	14	Simon Deli
LB	3	Ghislain Konan
CM	18	Ibrahim Sangaré	(substituted off) 73'
CM	4	Jean Michaël Seri
CM	8	Franck Kessié	(substituted off) 82'
RF	19	Nicolas Pépé
CF	22	Sébastien Haller	(substituted off) 72'
LF	9	Wilfried Zaha	(substituted off) 82'
Substitutions:
FW	24	Christian Kouamé	(substituted on) 72'
MF	25	Hamed Traorè	(substituted on) 73'
MF	20	Serey Dié	(substituted on) 82'
FW	10	Jean Evrard Kouassi	(substituted on) 82'
DF	7	Odilon Kossounou	(substituted on) 90+3'
Manager:
(France) Patrice Beaumelle

GK	1	Mohamed Kamara
RB	2	Osman Kakay	(yellow card) 52'
CB	17	Umaru Bangura (c)
CB	5	Steven Caulker
LB	3	Kevin Wright
RM	19	Mustapha Bundu		(substituted off) 75'
CM	7	Kwame Quee
CM	6	John Kamara
LM	14	Mohamed Buya Turay		(substituted off) 73'
CF	10	Kei Kamara		(substituted off) 83'
CF	28	Musa Noah Kamara
Substitutions:
MF	22	Issa Kallon		(substituted on) 73'
FW	12	Alhaji Kamara	(yellow card) 90+5'	(substituted on) 75'
FW	11	Sullay Kaikai		(substituted on) 83'
Manager:
(England) John Keister

Man of the Match:
Nicolas Pépé (Ivory Coast)

Assistant referees:
Djibril Camara (Senegal)
Sidiki Sidibe (Guinea)
Fourth official:
Issa Sy (Senegal)
Video assistant referee:
Bakary Gassama (Gambia)
Assistant video assistant referee:
El Hadj Malick Samba (Senegal)

=== Algeria vs Equatorial Guinea ===
16 January 2022
20:00

Algeria	0–1	Equatorial Guinea
	Report	Esteban 70'

Japoma Stadium, Douala
Referee: Mario Escobar (Guatemala)

Algeria	Equatorial Guinea

GK	23	Raïs M'Bolhi
RB	20	Youcef Atal
CB	2	Aïssa Mandi	(yellow card) 45+1'
CB	4	Djamel Benlamri		(substituted off) 54'
LB	21	Ramy Bensebaini	(yellow card) 8'
CM	22	Ismaël Bennacer
CM	14	Sofiane Bendebka		(substituted off) 73'
RW	7	Riyad Mahrez (c)
AM	10	Sofiane Feghouli		(substituted off) 64'
LW	8	Youcef Belaïli
CF	9	Baghdad Bounedjah	(yellow card) 4'	(substituted off) 64'
Substitutions:
DF	3	Mehdi Tahrat		(substituted on) 54'
MF	15	Farid Boulaya		(substituted on) 64'
FW	13	Islam Slimani		(substituted on) 64'
MF	11	Yacine Brahimi		(substituted on) 73'
Manager:
Djamel Belmadi

GK	1	Jesús Owono
RB	15	Carlos Akapo (c)
CB	21	Esteban Obiang	(yellow card) 90+4'
CB	16	Saúl Coco
LB	11	Basilio Ndong	(yellow card) 9'
CM	22	Pablo Ganet
CM	8	José Machín
RW	6	Iban Salvador		(substituted off) 90+2'
AM	4	Federico Bikoro	(yellow card) 43'	(substituted off) 66'
LW	14	Jannick Buyla		(substituted off) 66'
CF	9	Óscar Siafá	(yellow card) 45+1'	(substituted off) 46'
Substitutions:
FW	19	Luis Nlavo		(substituted on) 46'
MF	17	Josete Miranda		(substituted on) 66'
FW	18	Dorian Junior		(substituted on) 66'
MF	20	Santiago Eneme		(substituted on) 90+2'
Manager:
Juan Michá

Man of the Match:
Iban Salvador (Equatorial Guinea)

Assistant referees:
Elvis Guy Noupue Nguegoue (Cameroon)
Issa Yaya (Chad)
Fourth official:
Joshua Bondo (Botswana)
Video assistant referee:
Fernando Guerrero (Mexico)
Assistant video assistant referee:
Mohammed Abdallah Ibrahim (Sudan)

=== Ivory Coast vs Algeria ===
20 January 2022
17:00

Ivory Coast	3–1	Algeria
Kessié 22'; I. Sangaré 39'; Pépé 54'	Report	Bendebka 73'

Japoma Stadium, Douala
Referee: Victor Gomes (South Africa)

Ivory Coast	Algeria

GK	23	Badra Ali Sangaré
RB	17	Serge Aurier (c)	(yellow card) 12'	(substituted off) 69'
CB	7	Odilon Kossounou
CB	14	Simon Deli	(yellow card) 12'	(substituted off) 68'
LB	3	Ghislain Konan
CM	18	Ibrahim Sangaré		(substituted off) 69'
CM	4	Jean Michaël Seri
CM	8	Franck Kessié
RF	19	Nicolas Pépé		(substituted off) 85'
CF	22	Sébastien Haller
LF	15	Max Gradel
Substitutions:
DF	5	Wilfried Kanon		(substituted on) 68'
MF	20	Serey Dié		(substituted on) 69'
MF	12	Habib Maïga	(yellow card) 72'	(substituted on) 69'
FW	9	Wilfried Zaha		(substituted on) 85'
Manager:
(France) Patrice Beaumelle

GK	23	Raïs M'Bolhi
RB	20	Youcef Atal		(substituted off) 80'
CB	2	Aïssa Mandi
CB	17	Abdelkader Bedrane
LB	21	Ramy Bensebaini
CM	22	Ismaël Bennacer		(substituted off) 62'
CM	6	Ramiz Zerrouki
RW	7	Riyad Mahrez (c)
AM	27	Saïd Benrahma		(substituted off) 46'
LW	8	Youcef Belaïli		(substituted off) 80'
CF	9	Baghdad Bounedjah		(substituted off) 62'
Substitutions:
FW	13	Islam Slimani		(substituted on) 46'
MF	11	Yacine Brahimi	(yellow card) 78'	(substituted on) 62'
MF	14	Sofiane Bendebka		(substituted on) 62'
MF	15	Farid Boulaya	(yellow card) 84'	(substituted on) 80'
DF	25	Houcine Benayada		(substituted on) 80'
Manager:
Djamel Belmadi

Man of the Match:
Franck Kessié (Ivory Coast)

Assistant referees:
Zakhele Siwela (South Africa)
Souru Phatsoane (Lesotho)
Fourth official:
Pacifique Ndabihawenimana (Burundi)
Video assistant referee:
Haythem Guirat (Tunisia)
Assistant video assistant referee:
Dahane Beida (Mauritania)

=== Sierra Leone vs Equatorial Guinea ===
20 January 2022
17:00

Sierra Leone	0–1	Equatorial Guinea
	Report	Ganet 38'

Limbe Stadium, Limbe
Referee: Mohamed Marouf Eid Mansour (Egypt)

Sierra Leone	Equatorial Guinea

GK	1	Mohamed Kamara
RB	2	Osman Kakay
CB	17	Umaru Bangura (c)
CB	5	Steven Caulker	(yellow card) 71'
LB	3	Kevin Wright	(yellow card) 71'	(substituted off) 75'
CM	6	John Kamara
CM	27	Abu Dumbuya		(substituted off) 46'
RW	7	Kwame Quee	(yellow card) 77' (yellow-red card) 90'
AM	10	Kei Kamara
LW	19	Mustapha Bundu		(substituted off) 53'
CF	28	Musa Noah Kamara	(yellow card) 23'
Substitutions:
FW	14	Mohamed Buya Turay	(yellow card) 90+6'	(substituted on) 46'
FW	12	Alhaji Kamara		(substituted on) 53'
MF	22	Issa Kallon		(substituted on) 75'
Manager:
(England) John Keister

GK	1	Jesús Owono
RB	15	Carlos Akapo (c)	(yellow card) 61'
CB	21	Esteban Obiang
CB	16	Saúl Coco
LB	11	Basilio Ndong
RM	6	Iban Salvador
CM	22	Pablo Ganet
CM	8	José Machín	(yellow card) 64'	(substituted off) 64'
LM	17	Josete Miranda	(yellow card) 76'	(substituted off) 88'
AM	4	Federico Bikoro		(substituted off) 64'
CF	18	Dorian Junior		(substituted off) 75'
Substitutions:
FW	19	Luis Nlavo		(substituted on) 64'
MF	14	Jannick Buyla		(substituted on) 64'
FW	10	Emilio Nsue		(substituted on) 75'
MF	7	Rubén Belima		(substituted on) 88'
Manager:
Juan Michá

Man of the Match:
Iban Salvador (Equatorial Guinea)

Assistant referees:
Mahmoud Ahmed Abouelregal (Egypt)
Ahmed Hossam Taha (Egypt)
Fourth official:
Mahmoud El Banna (Egypt)
Video assistant referee:
Mahmoud Mohamed Ashour (Egypt)
Assistant video assistant referee:
Ahmed El Ghandour (Egypt)
