= John Keister =

John Keister may refer to:

- John Keister (comedian) (born 1956), American comedian and writer
- John Keister (footballer, born 1970), Sierra Leonean international footballer and coach
- John Keister (footballer, born 1988), Sierra Leonean footballer currently at PK-37

== See also ==
- Keister (disambiguation)
