= Alhaji Kamara =

Sierra Leonean footballer (born 1994)

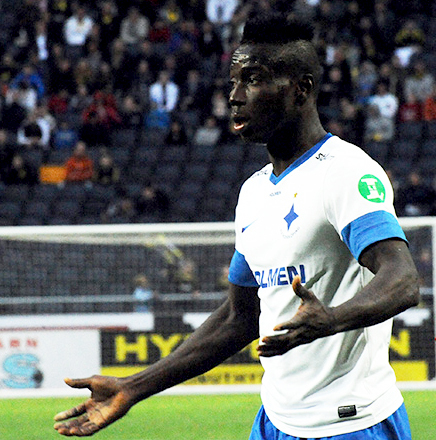
- Kamara with IFK Norrköping in 2014

Personal information
- Date of birth: 16 April 1994 (age 32)
- Place of birth: Freetown, Sierra Leone
- Height: 1.80 m (5 ft 11 in)
- Position: Forward

Youth career
- Belvic United
- FC Kallon

Senior career*
Years	Team	Apps	(Gls)
2010–2012	FC Kallon	31	(13)
2012	→ Djurgårdens IF (loan)	5	(0)
2013	→ IK Frej (loan)	14	(2)
2013	→ IFK Värnamo (loan)	10	(6)
2014–2016	IFK Norrköping	40	(16)
2015	→ Johor Darul Ta'zim (loan)	4	(1)
2016–2017	D.C. United	9	(1)
2017	→ Richmond Kickers (loan)	9	(4)
2017–2018	Al-Taawoun	14	(5)
2018–2019	Sheriff Tiraspol	14	(9)
2019	Vendsyssel	8	(4)
2019–2024	Randers	82	(22)
2024–2025	Midtjylland	3	(0)
2024–2025	→ Mafra (loan)	7	(0)

International career
2014–2024	Sierra Leone	17	(5)
- * Club domestic league appearances and goals

Alhaji Kamara (born 16 April 1994) is a Sierra Leonean former professional footballer who played as a forward. He began his playing career with FC Kallon in his home country before going on to represent several clubs, including Sweden's Djurgårdens IF and IFK Norrköping, as well as Denmark's Randers FC. During his time at IFK Norrköping, he won the Allsvenskan title in 2015. He also represented the Sierra Leone national team and participated in the 2021 Africa Cup of Nations.

== Club career ==
=== FC Kallon ===
He started his professional career at FC Kallon in the Sierra Leone National First Division. At a young age, he had trials with Tippeligaen club Fredrikstad FK and Portland Timbers of Major League Soccer. Eventually he was signed by Swedish club Djurgårdens IF just after turning 18 years old. Kamara failed to make an impact at Djurgårdens IF, and instead enjoyed loan spells to IK Frej and IFK Värnamo.

=== IFK Norrköping ===
Before the 2014 season, he was signed by IFK Norrköping, where he positioned himself as a key player during his first season. On 31 March 2015, Kamara was loaned out to Malaysia's Super League champion, Johor Darul Ta'zim from IFK Norrköping.

However, the loan was cancelled in July 2015. He returned to Norrköping, and featured fourteen times as the team won the league.

=== D.C. United ===
Kamara signed for D.C. United on 11 May 2016. Kamara scored with his first touch in his debut for D.C. United just seconds after coming on against Sporting Kansas City at Children's Mercy Park. His goal was the difference, as United went on to win the match 1–0. During his time with United's USL affiliate, the Richmond Kickers, he scored a hat-trick on 27 May 2017.

=== Al-Taawoun ===
On 23 June 2017 Kamara signed with Al-Taawoun.

=== Sheriff Tiraspol ===
On 2 February 2018, Kamara signed for Sheriff Tiraspol.

=== Vendsyssel ===
After one year in the club, he moved to Danish Superliga club Vendsyssel FF on 19 February 2019.

=== Randers ===
On 15 May 2019 it was confirmed, that Kamara would join Randers FC for the 2019–20 season on a free transfer.

=== Midtjylland ===
On 1 February 2024, Kamara joined FC Midtjylland on a two-year deal. After just 4 games in the Midtjylland shirt, the club confirmed on 2 September 2024 that Kamara joined Portuguese Mafra on a loan deal for the 2024-25 season.

After returning from loan early, Kamara retired from playing on 4 April 2025.

== International career ==
Kamara made his first start for the Sierra Leone national team on 29 February 2012 against São Tomé and Príncipe. He marked the occasion by scoring his first international goal, although he could not prevent his team from suffering a 2–1 defeat.

On 13 October 2015, he scored his second international goal against Chad. Sierra Leone won the match 2–1 in the 2018 FIFA World Cup qualification campaign. He was subsequently absent from the starting line-up for five years. On 13 November 2020, he returned to the national team and scored twice against the Nigeria, helping Sierra Leone come from behind to secure a 4–4 draw.

In January 2022, Kamara was named by manager John Keister in Sierra Leone's squad for the 2021 Africa Cup of Nations.

== Personal life ==
In February 2016, it was reported that Kamara had a potential heart condition that could have ended his professional career, leading to his indefinite suspension from playing football. Kamara was evaluated by MLS cardiologist consultant Matthew Martinez, a specialist at MedStar Georgetown University Hospital. After rigorous testing, it was determined that Kamara's condition was not a threat, and he was medically cleared to resume his professional career. He subsequently joined D.C. United in Major League Soccer, with the agreement that he would undergo preventative medical tests at the end of each season.

== Career statistics ==
As of 12 May 2016.

Club	Season	League		Cup		Continental		Total	
Club	Season	Apps	Goals	Apps	Goals	Apps	Goals	Apps	Goals
Djurgårdens IF	2012	5	0	1	0	—		6	0
IK Frej	2013	14	2	3	1	—		17	3
IFK Värnamo	2013	10	6	1	2	—		11	8
IFK Norrköping	2014	26	10	3	0	—		29	10
Johor Darul Ta'zim	2015	4	1	0	0	—		4	1
IFK Norrköping	2015	14	6	4	3	—		18	9
IFK Norrköping	2016	26	10	4	2	0	0	30	12
IFK Norrköping	Total	40	16	8	5	0	0	48	21
D.C. United	2016	9	1	0	0	—		9	1
Career total		82	26	13	8	0	0	95	34

=== International goals ===
Scores and results list Sierra Leone's goal tally first.

No.	Date	Venue	Opponent	Score	Result	Competition
1.	29 February 2012	Estádio Nacional 12 de Julho, São Tomé, São Tomé and Príncipe	São Tomé and Príncipe	1–0	1–2	2013 Africa Cup of Nations qualification
2.	13 October 2015	Adokiye Amiesimaka Stadium, Port Harcourt, Nigeria	Chad	1–1	2–1	2018 FIFA World Cup qualification
3.	13 November 2020	Samuel Ogbemudia Stadium, Benin City, Nigeria	Nigeria	2–4	4–4	2021 Africa Cup of Nations qualification
4.	13 November 2020	Samuel Ogbemudia Stadium, Benin City, Nigeria	Nigeria	4–4	4–4	2021 Africa Cup of Nations qualification
5.	16 January 2022	Japoma Stadium, Douala, Cameroon	Ivory Coast	2–2	2–2	2021 Africa Cup of Nations

== Honours ==
IFK Norrköping

- Allsvenskan: 2015

Randers

- Danish Cup: 2020–21
