= Mohamed Kamara (footballer, born 1999) =

Sierra Leonean footballer (born 1999)

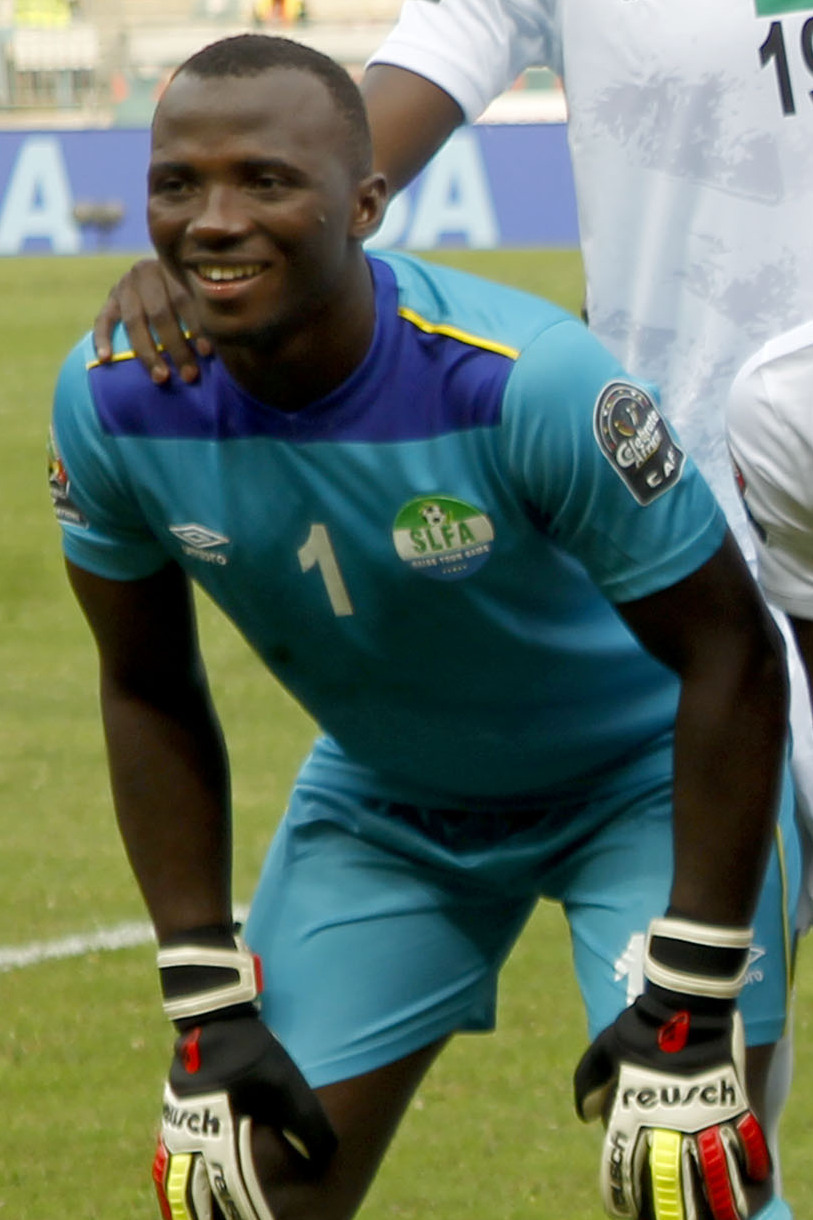
- Kamara with Sierra Leone at the 2021 Africa Cup of Nations

Personal information
- Full name: Mohamed Nbalies Kamara
- Date of birth: 29 May 1999 (age 27)
- Place of birth: Kambia, Sierra Leone
- Height: 1.87 m (6 ft 2 in)
- Position: Goalkeeper

Team information
- Current team: Horoya
- Number: 35

Senior career*
Years	Team	Apps	(Gls)
2017–2018	F.C. Johansen		
2019–2022	East End Lions		
2022–	Horoya		

International career^{‡}
2018–	Sierra Leone	18	(0)
- * Club domestic league appearances and goals as of 23:49, 25 November 2022 (UTC) ‡ National team caps and goals as of 23:49, 25 November 2022 (UTC)

Mohamed Nbalie Kamara (born 29 May 1999) is a Sierra Leonean professional footballer who plays as a goalkeeper for Horoya and the Sierra Leone national team.

He received attention for his performance against Algeria in Sierra Leone's opening 2021 Africa Cup of Nations match, being named Man of the Match after holding the defending champions to a 0–0 draw.

== Club career ==
Mohamed Kamara started his career with Sierra Leonean side F.C. Johansen where he stayed for a season before joining East End Lions he spent three years at the club. On 22 May 2022, Guinean club Horoya announced they had signed him on a two-year contract lasting until 2024.

== International career ==
He was called up to the 2021 Africa Cup of Nations as first choice goalkeeper where he shone in the team's opening game against defending champions Algeria where he kept a cleansheet and followed up with winning man of the match. Kamara made headlines worldwide due to his unorthodox goalkeeping style used in his man of the match performance. In the second game against Ivory Coast where he saved Franck Kessie penalty to secure a 2–2 draw. Sierra Leone would go on to exit the groupstage after a loss to Equatorial Guinea.
