= Kelvin Kampamba =

Zambian footballer (born 1996)

Personal information
- Full name: Kelvin Mubanga Kampamba
- Date of birth: 24 November 1996 (age 29)
- Place of birth: Zambia
- Position: Midfielder

Team information
- Current team: Al-Madina SC
- Number: 24

Senior career*
| Years | Team | Apps | (Gls) |
| 2013–2015 | Nkana | | |
| 2015–2018 | Power Dynamos | 6 | (1) |
| 2018–2020 | Nkana | 26 | (8) |
| 2020–2025 | ZESCO United F.C. | | |

International career^{‡}
| 2013– | Zambia | 49 | (7) |
- * Club domestic league appearances and goals ‡ National team caps and goals as of 10 September 2024

Kelvin Mubanga Kampamba (born 24 November 1996) is a Zambian professional footballer who plays as a midfielder. He is part of the Zambia national team.

== Career ==
=== International ===
==== Goals ====
Scores and results list Zambia's goal tally first.

| Goal | Date | Venue | Opponent | Score | Result | Competition |
|---|---|---|---|---|---|---|
| 1. | 3 August 2019 | National Heroes Stadium, Lusaka, Zambia | Botswana | 2–2 | 3–2 | 2020 African Nations Championship qualification |
| 2. | 11 October 2020 | Royal Bafokeng Stadium, Rustenburg, South Africa | South Africa | 1–1 | 2–1 | Friendly |
| 3. | 22 October 2020 | Addis Ababa Stadium, Addis Ababa, Ethiopia | Ethiopia | 1–1 | 3–2 | Friendly |
| 4. | 27 March 2022 | Mardan Sports Complex, Aksu, Turkey | Benin | 1–0 | 1–2 | Friendly |
| 5. | 15 July 2022 | Moses Mabhida, Durban, South Africa | Senegal | 1–0 | 4–3 | 2022 COSAFA Cup |
| 6. | 15 July 2022 | Moses Mabhida, Durban, South Africa | Senegal | 4–1 | 4–3 | 2022 COSAFA Cup |
| 7. | 10 September 2024 | Levy Mwanawasa Stadium, Ndola, Zambia | Sierra Leone | 2–1 | 3–2 | 2025 Africa Cup of Nations qualification |
