= Esteban Obiang =

Equatoguinean footballer (born 1998)

Esteban Orozco
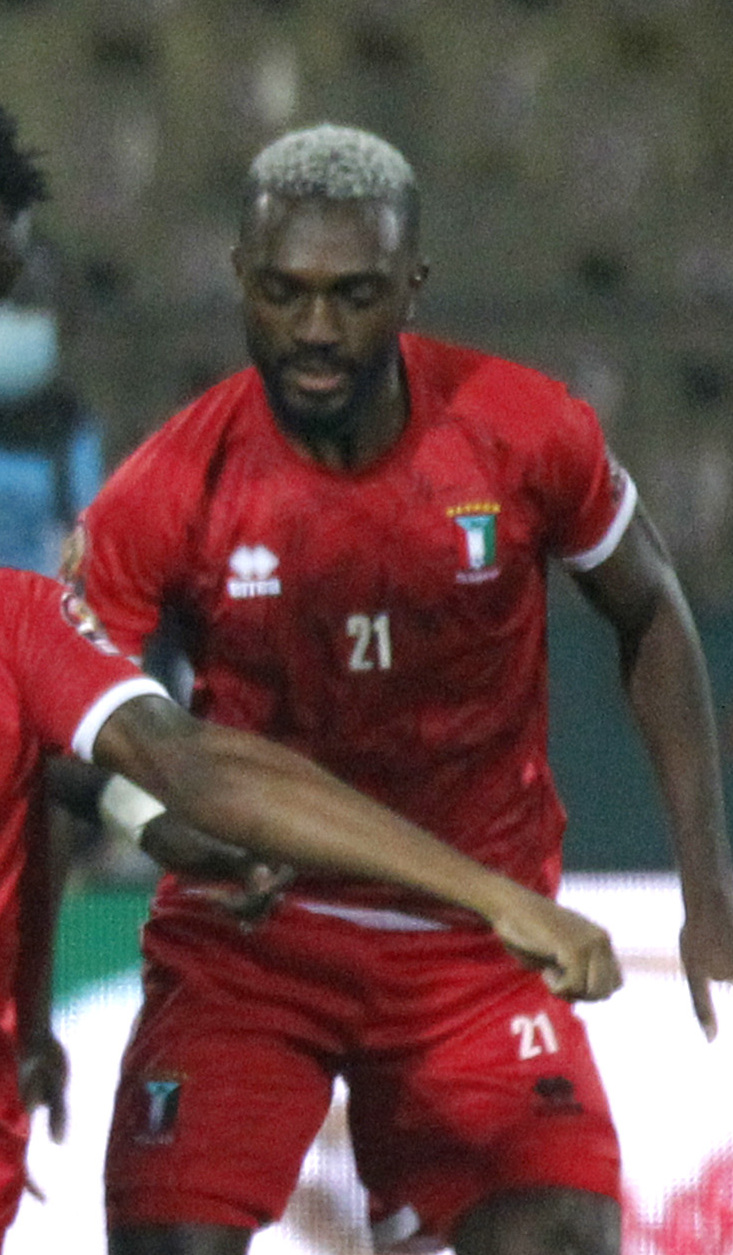
- Obiang with Equatorial Guinea in 2022

Personal information
- Full name: Esteban Orozco Fernández
- Birth name: Esteban Obiang Obono
- Date of birth: 7 May 1998 (age 28)
- Place of birth: Zaragoza, Spain
- Height: 1.86 m (6 ft 1 in)
- Positions: Defender; defensive midfielder

Team information
- Current team: Haiphong
- Number: 97

Youth career
- 2011–2016: Utrera
- 2016–2017: Betis

Senior career*
Years	Team	Apps	(Gls)
2016	Utrera	7	(0)
2017–2018	Betis B	3	(0)
2018	→ Utrera (loan)	14	(0)
2018–2019	Utrera	15	(1)
2019–2021	Ibiza	1	(0)
2019–2021	→ Sant Rafel (loan)	41	(3)
2021–2022	Antequera	13	(0)
2022–2023	Chindia Târgoviște	27	(1)
2023–2026	Argeș Pitești	48	(2)
2026	Unirea Slobozia	13	(0)
2026–	Haiphong	2	(0)

International career^{‡}
2017–	Equatorial Guinea	47	(1)
- * Club domestic league appearances and goals as of 13 September 2026 ‡ National team caps and goals as of 31 December 2025

Esteban Orozco Fernández (born Esteban Obiang Obono, 7 May 1998), also known simply as Esteban, is a professional footballer who plays as a defender or a defensive midfielder for V.League 1 club Haiphong. Born in Spain, he plays for the Equatorial Guinea national team.

Originally registered in the Spanish football competitions with his Equatorial Guinean biological parents' surnames (Obiang Obono), Orozco later replaced them with the ones from his Spanish adoptive parents (Orozco Fernández).

== Early life ==
Esteban was born in Zaragoza. His biological mother died from complications during his birth. Then, his grandmother and his aunt took care of him. When he was only 22 months old, he was adopted by a Spanish family from Utrera, where he would spend most of his life. He considers himself as a person from Utrera.

== Club career ==
Esteban made his senior debut with CD Utrera on 7 February 2016, in a 1–1 away tie against CD Alcalá. He finished that season having played a total of 7 Tercera División matches. Then, he moved to the youth team of Real Betis Balompié.

Esteban was renewed by Betis and promoted to its reserve team. He made his Segunda División B debut on 25 November 2017, in a 1–4 away win against FC Cartagena. On 25 January 2018, he returned to Utrera, loaned by Betis.

== International career ==
Esteban made his international debut for Equatorial Guinea on 9 October 2017, in a 3–1 victory over Mauritius in a friendly match. He came on as a second-half substitute for Diosdado Mbele. On 16 January 2022, he help his national team to defeat Algeria during the 2021 Africa Cup of Nations by scoring the lone goal of the match.

In January 2024, he took part in the 2023 Africa Cup of Nations.

== Career statistics ==
=== International ===
As of match played 31 December 2025

Appearances and goals by national team and year
National team	Year	Apps	Goals
Equatorial Guinea	2017	1	0
Equatorial Guinea	2018	1	0
Equatorial Guinea	2019	3	0
Equatorial Guinea	2020	2	0
Equatorial Guinea	2021	4	0
Equatorial Guinea	2022	7	1
Equatorial Guinea	2023	6	0
Equatorial Guinea	2024	13	0
Equatorial Guinea	2025	10	0
Total		47	1

Scores and results list Equatorial Guinea's goal tally first, score column indicates score after each Esteban goal.

List of international goals scored by Esteban Obiang
No.	Date	Venue	Opponent	Score	Result	Competition
1	16 January 2022	Japoma Stadium, Douala, Cameroon	Algeria	1–0	1–0	2021 Africa Cup of Nations

== Honours ==
Argeș Pitești

- Liga II: 2024–25
