= Abu Dumbuya =

Sierra Leonean footballer

Personal information
- Date of birth: 29 January 1999 (age 27)
- Place of birth: Freetown, Sierra Leone
- Height: 1.95 m (6 ft 5 in)
- Position: Midfielder

Team information
- Current team: Al-Wefaq Ajdabiya
- Number: 5

Senior career*
Years	Team	Apps	(Gls)
2014	Kallon		
2015	Old Edwardians		
2016	Johansen		
2017	Central Parade		
2018	Wusum Stars		
2019–2022	East End Lions		
2023	Freetown City		
2023–2024	Gençlik Gücü	41	(2)
2025	AC Oulu	9	(0)
2025	Żabbar St. Patrick	11	(0)
2026–	Al-Wefaq Ajdabiya	2	(0)

International career^{‡}
2019–	Sierra Leone	22	(1)
- * Club domestic league appearances and goals as of 19 March 2026 ‡ National team caps and goals as of 8 October 2025

Abu Dumbuya (born 29 January 1999) is a Sierra Leonean footballer who plays as a midfielder for Libyan Premier League side Al-Wefaq Ajdabiya, and the Sierra Leone national team.

== Club career ==
Dumbuya played in his native Sierra Leone in top-tier Sierra Leone National Premier League for various clubs during 2014–2023. In 2019, when playing for East End Lions, they won the national championship title.

During 2023–2024, he played for KTFF Süper Lig club Gençlik Gücü in Northern Cyprus.

On 3 January 2025, Dumbuya signed with Finnish Veikkausliiga club AC Oulu for the 2025 season. He left the club in the beginning of July.

== International career ==
He was named in Sierra Leone's squad for the 2021 Africa Cup of Nations final tournament, which was held in January and February 2022.

== Career statistics ==
=== Club ===
As of 3 July 2025

Appearances and goals by club, season and competition
Club	Season	League			National cup (Note: Includes Northern Cypriot Cup and Finnish Cup)		Other		Total	
Club	Season	Division	Apps	Goals	Apps	Goals	Apps	Goals	Apps	Goals
Gençlik Gücü	2023–24	KTFF Süper Lig	28	1	2	1	–		30	2
Gençlik Gücü	2024–25	KTFF Süper Lig	13	1	0	0	–		13	1
Gençlik Gücü	Total		41	2	2	1	0	0	43	3
AC Oulu	2025	Veikkausliiga	9	0	1	0	0	0	10	0
Career total			51	2	3	1	0	0	53	3

=== International ===
As of match played 25 March 2025

Appearances and goals by national team and year
National team	Year	Apps	Goals
Sierra Leone	2019	3	0
Sierra Leone	2020	1	0
Sierra Leone	2021	3	0
Sierra Leone	2022	3	0
Sierra Leone	2023	2	0
Sierra Leone	2024	7	1
Sierra Leone	2025	2	0
Total		21	1

=== International goals ===
As of match played 13 November 2024. Sierra Leone score listed first, score column indicates score after each Dumbuya goal.

List of international goals scored by Abu Dumbuya
No.	Date	Venue	Opponent	Score	Result	Competition
1	13 November 2024	Alassane Ouattara Stadium, Abidjan, Ivory Coast	Chad	1–0	1–1	2025 Africa Cup of Nations qualification

== Honours ==
East End Lions Freetown

- Sierra Leone National Premier League: 2019
