= Keister House =

Historic house in Virginia, United States

- U.S. National Register of Historic Places
- Virginia Landmarks Register
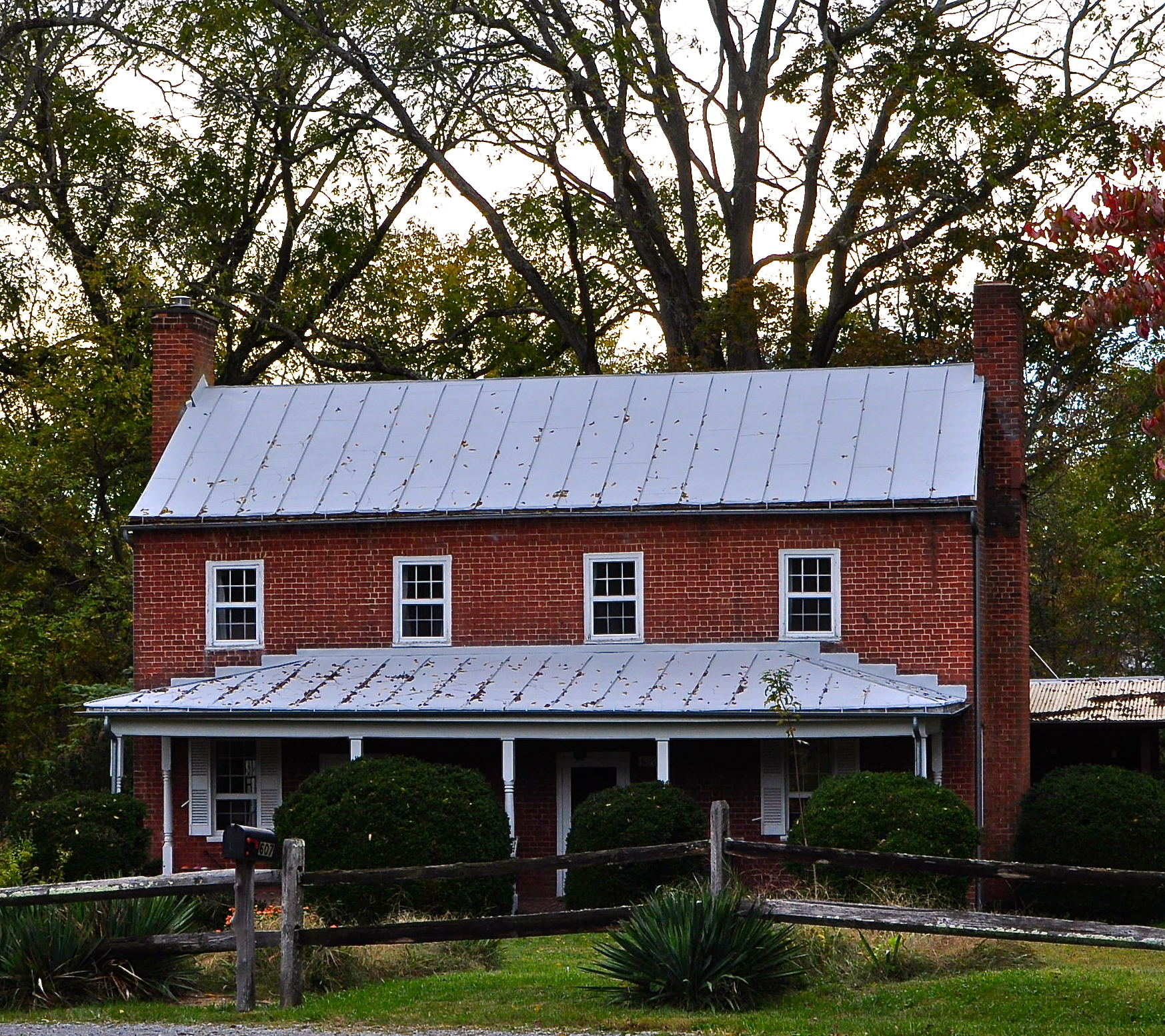
- Keister House, October 2013

- Location within Virginia Location within the United States
- Location: 607 Giles Rd., Blacksburg, Virginia
- Coordinates: 37°14′25″N 80°25′2″W
- Area: less than one acre
- Built: c. 1835
- MPS: Montgomery County MPS
- NRHP reference No.: 89001880
- VLR No.: 150-5014

Significant dates
- Added to NRHP: November 13, 1989
- Designated VLR: June 20, 1989

Keister House is a historic home located at Blacksburg, Montgomery County, Virginia. It was built in the 1830s, and is a two-story, four-bay brick two-room-plan house. It has exterior end chimneys and a hipped roof front porch. The property was owned by the Keister Family from 1800 until a 1935 foreclosure.

A family room was added to the rear of the house in 1971.

It was listed on the National Register of Historic Places in 1989.
