= Badra Ali Sangaré =

Ivorian footballer

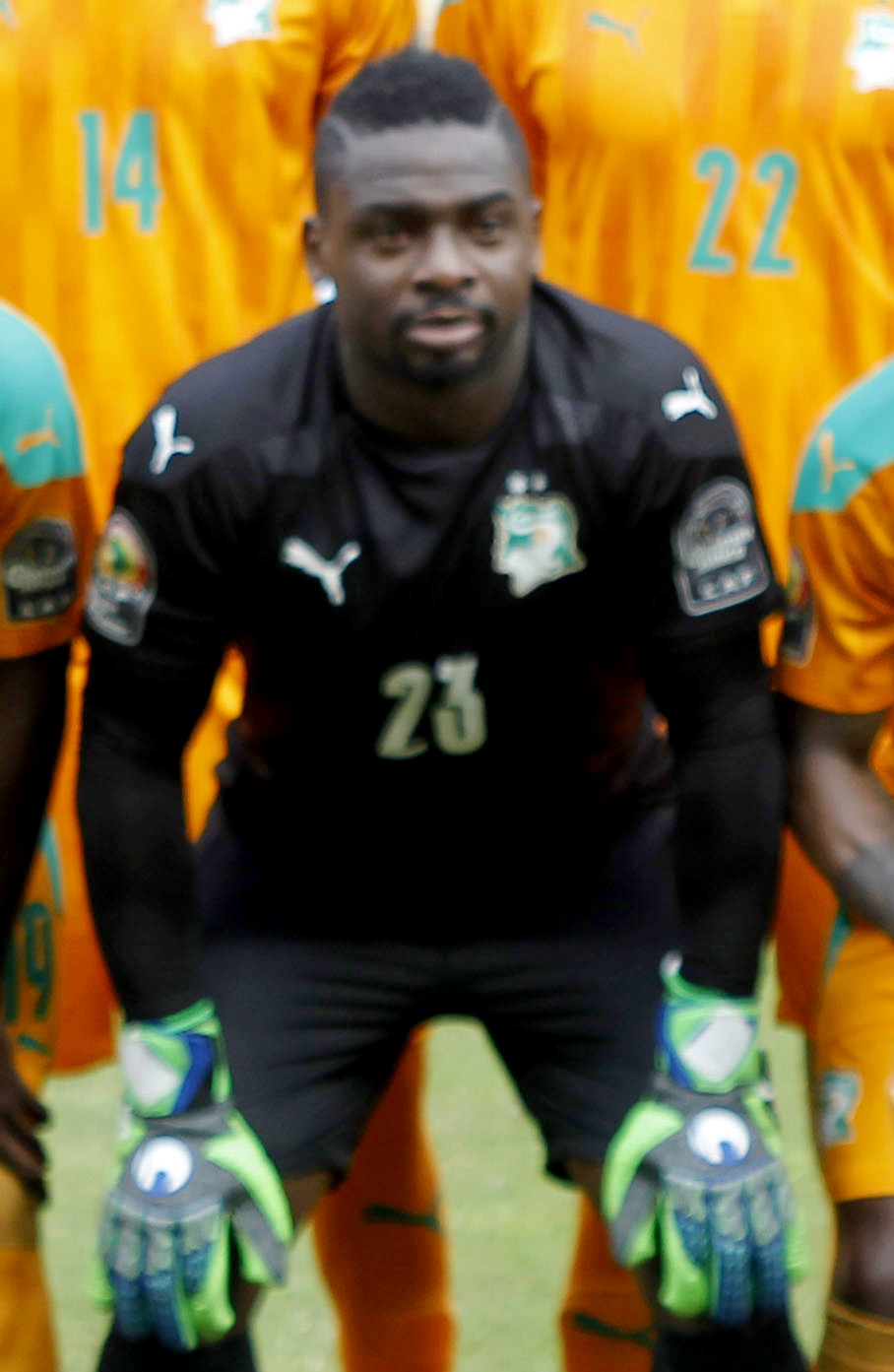
- Sangaré with Ivory Coast at the 2021 Africa Cup of Nations

Personal information
- Full name: Badra Ali Sangaré
- Date of birth: 30 May 1986 (age 40)
- Place of birth: Bingerville, Ivory Coast
- Height: 1.81 m (5 ft 11 in)
- Position: Goalkeeper

Team information
- Current team: Sekhukhune United
- Number: 30

Youth career
- Académie J-M Guillou

Senior career*
Years	Team	Apps	(Gls)
2004–2005	ES Bingerville	0	(0)
2006–2007	Chonburi	34	(0)
2007–2008	BEC Tero Sasana	9	(0)
2009	Olympic Charleroi	6	(0)
2009–2012	Séwé Sports	24	(0)
2012–2014	Ivoire Académie	28	(0)
2014–2017	ASEC Mimosas	85	(0)
2017–2019	Free State Stars	51	(0)
2019–2020	Uthongathi	25	(0)
2020–2022	JDR Stars	26	(0)
2022–	Sekhukhune United	43	(0)

International career^{‡}
2008	Ivory Coast U-23		
2009–	Ivory Coast	30	(0)
Medal record
Representing Ivory Coast
Men's football
Africa Cup of Nations
Winner	2023 Ivory Coast
- * Club domestic league appearances and goals as of 15 June 2024 ‡ National team caps and goals as of 14:24, 4 November 2019 (UTC)

Badra Ali Sangaré (born 30 May 1986) is an Ivorian professional footballer who plays as a goalkeeper for South African Premier Division club Sekhukhune United and the Ivory Coast national team.

== Club career ==
Born in Bingerville, Sangaré began to play for the Académie J-M Guillou before he his first professional contract with ES Bingerville in 2004. He joined Thai Premier League club Chonburi FC in 2006, where he played for one year. Sangaré then signed on 9 March 2007 with BEC Tero Sasana FC and left Thailand upon expiry of his contract on 29 December 2008. He signed with Olympic Charleroi in Belgium, but after a half a year signed for Séwé Sports de San Pedro in July 2009 .

== International career ==
Sangaré's first call-up to the Ivory Coast national team was on 27 March 2009 against Malawi. Previously, he played with the Ivory Coast U-23 team at the 2008 Toulon Tournament and the UEMOA Tournament. He represented the Ivory Coast at the 2008 Summer Olympics in Beijing. He also played two African Cups of Nations.

On 28 December 2023, Sangaré was named in Jean-Louis Gasset's 27-man Ivory Coast squad for the 2023 Africa Cup of Nations.

== Honours ==
Ivory Coast

- Africa Cup of Nations: 2023
