= Keister Family Fiddlers =

Canadian musical group

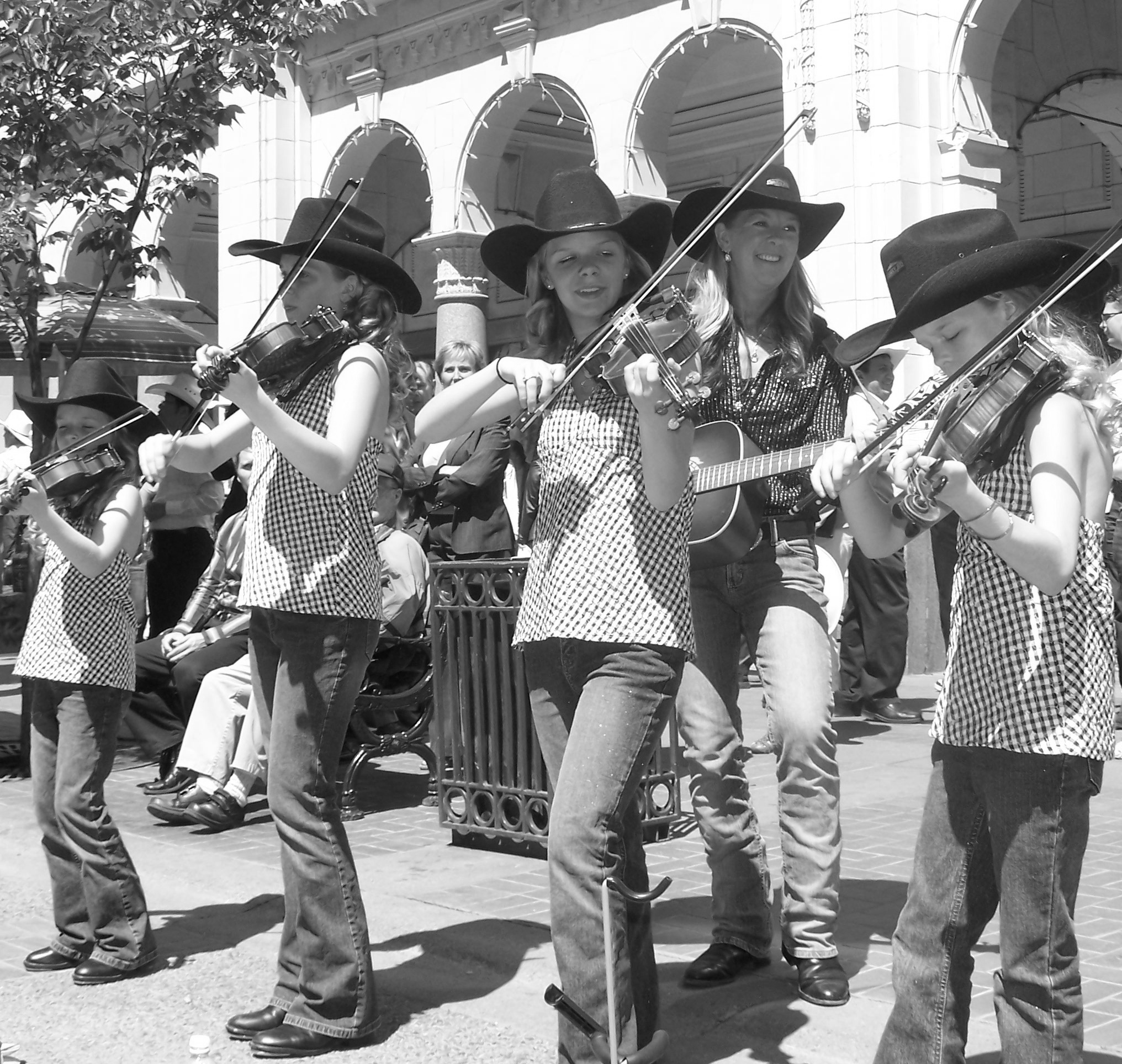
- Stephen Avenue, Calgary (2009)

Background information
- Origin: Chestermere, Alberta, Canada
- Genres: Traditional and Celtic style
- Years active: 2008-
- Members: Claire Keister; Faith Keister; Paige Keister; Quinn Keister
- Website: KeisterFamilyFiddlers.com

The Keister Family Fiddlers is a Canadian musical group from Chestermere made of sisters Quinn, Claire, Faith, and Paige Keister; who are often accompanied by their mother Sherry Keister in performances. They have performed in different countries, including South Korea and China. For a number of years the Fiddlers were regular performers at the Calgary Stampede.

The group plays traditional and Celtic style music. Each of the sisters began playing the fiddle when they were six years old. In addition to fiddles, the group use other instruments, such as the ugly stick and tambourine. Sometimes square dancing or tap dancing will be performed while playing the fiddle.

Loren Keister, father of the sisters, serves as the manager for the group. All four sisters enrolled in the Rocky View Learning Connection program of Rocky View Schools, so that they could learn from home online, which allowed them to better balance their time spent in practice with demands of school.
