= 2025 Africa Cup of Nations qualification Group G =

2025 AFCON qualifying group G

Group G of the 2025 Africa Cup of Nations qualification was one of twelve groups that decided the teams which qualified for the 2025 Africa Cup of Nations final tournament in Morocco. The group consisted of four teams: defending champions Ivory Coast, Zambia, Sierra Leone and Chad.

The teams played against each other in a home-and-away round-robin format between September and November 2024.

Zambia and Ivory Coast, the group winners and runners-up respectively, qualified for the 2025 Africa Cup of Nations.

== Standings ==
Pos	Team	Pld	W	D	L	GF	GA	GD	Pts	Qualification	Zambia	Côte d'Ivoire	Sierra Leone	Chad
1	Zambia	6	4	1	1	7	4	+3	13	Final tournament	—	1–0	3–2	0–0
2	Ivory Coast	6	4	0	2	12	3	+9	12	Final tournament	2–0	—	4–1	4–0
3	Sierra Leone	6	1	2	3	5	10	−5	5		0–2	1–0	—	0–0
4	Chad	6	0	3	3	1	8	−7	3		0–1	0–2	1–1	—

Source: CAF
Rules for classification: Tiebreakers

== Matches ==
6 September 2024
16:00 UTC+0

Sierra Leone	0–0	Chad
	Report

Samuel Kanyon Doe Sports Complex, Monrovia (Liberia)
Referee: George Gatogato (Burundi)
6 September 2024
19:00 UTC+0

Ivory Coast	2–0	Zambia
Krasso 73', 84'	Report

Stade de la Paix, Bouaké
Referee: Mustapha Ghorbal (Algeria)

10 September 2024
15:00 UTC+2

Zambia	3–2	Sierra Leone
K. Musonda 28'; Kampamba 70'; Kangwa 85'	Report	Kargbo 33'; Mustapha 73'

Levy Mwanawasa Stadium, Ndola
Referee: Aklesso Gnama (Togo)
10 September 2024
20:00 UTC+1

Chad	0–2	Ivory Coast
	Report	Krasso 45+3'; Diakité 55'

Ahmadou Ahidjo Stadium, Yaoundé (Cameroon)
Referee: Tsegay Mogos Teklu (Eritrea)

11 October 2024
15:00 UTC+2

Zambia	0–0	Chad
	Report

Levy Mwanawasa Stadium, Ndola
Referee: Mahmoud El Banna (Egypt)
11 October 2024
19:00 UTC+0

Ivory Coast	4–1	Sierra Leone
Pépé 3'; Kessié 51', 76' (pen.); Diakité 87' (pen.)	Report	Koroma 43'

Laurent Pokou Stadium, San-Pédro
Attendance: 16,553
Referee: Abongile Tom (South Africa)

15 October 2024
14:00 UTC+1

Chad	0–1	Zambia
	Report	K. Musonda 70'

Ahmadou Ahidjo Stadium, Yaoundé (Cameroon)
Referee: Peter Waweru (Kenya)
15 October 2024
16:00 UTC+0

Sierra Leone	1–0	Ivory Coast
Bakayoko 85'	Report

Samuel Kanyon Doe Sports Complex, Monrovia (Liberia)
Attendance: 7,408
Referee: Jeannot Franck Bito (Cameroon)

13 November 2024
18:00 UTC+0

Chad	1–1	Sierra Leone
Thiam 34' (pen.)	Report	Dumbuya 29'

Alassane Ouattara Stadium, Abidjan (Ivory Coast)
Referee: Jean Ouattara (Burkina Faso)
15 November 2024
17:00 UTC+2

Zambia	1–0	Ivory Coast
K. Musonda 43'	Report

Levy Mwanawasa Stadium, Ndola
Attendance: 49,800
Referee: Omar Artan (Somalia)

19 November 2024
15:00 UTC+0

Ivory Coast	4–0	Chad
Bayo 25'; Adingra 37'; Agbadou 77'; Diakité 90+3'	Report

Felix Houphouet Boigny Stadium, Abidjan
Attendance: 32,400
Referee: Sadok Selmi (Tunisia)
19 November 2024
15:00 UTC+0

Sierra Leone	0–2	Zambia
	Report	Banda 54'; K. Musonda 71'

Samuel Kanyon Doe Sports Complex, Monrovia (Liberia)
Referee: Yannick Malala (Congo DR)

== Goalscorers ==
There were 25 goals scored in 12 matches, for an average of 2.08 goals per match.

4 goals

- (Zambia) Kennedy Musonda

3 goals

- (Ivory Coast) Oumar Diakité
- (Ivory Coast) Jean-Philippe Krasso

2 goals

- (Ivory Coast) Franck Kessié

1 goal

- (Chad) Mahamat Thiam
- (Ivory Coast) Simon Adingra
- (Ivory Coast) Emmanuel Agbadou
- (Ivory Coast) Vakoun Issouf Bayo
- (Ivory Coast) Nicolas Pépé
- (Sierra Leone) Amadou Bakayoko
- (Sierra Leone) Abu Dumbuya
- (Sierra Leone) Augustus Kargbo
- (Sierra Leone) Alhassan Koroma
- (Sierra Leone) Hindolo Mustapha
- (Zambia) Emmanuel Banda
- (Zambia) Kelvin Kampamba
- (Zambia) Kings Kangwa
