= Ibrahim Sangaré (Ivorian footballer) =

Ivorian footballer (born 1997)

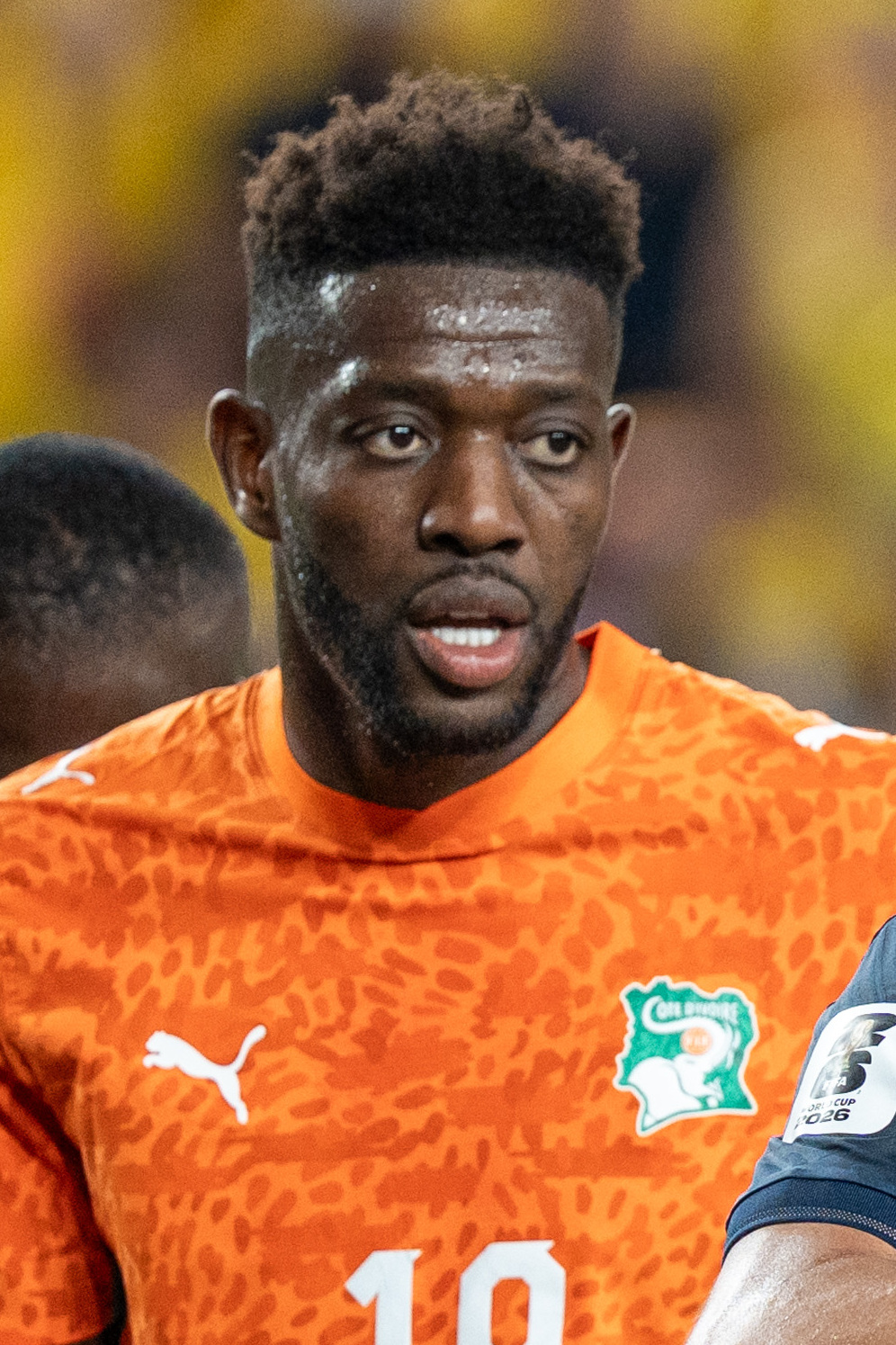
- Sangaré with Ivory Coast in 2026

Personal information
- Full name: Ibrahim Sangaré
- Date of birth: 2 December 1997 (age 28)
- Place of birth: Koumassi, Ivory Coast
- Height: 1.91 m (6 ft 3 in)
- Position: Defensive midfielder

Team information
- Current team: Nottingham Forest
- Number: 6

Youth career
- 2011: Tout Puissant Koumassi
- 2012–2016: AS Denguélé

Senior career*
Years	Team	Apps	(Gls)
2016–2017	Toulouse B	16	(0)
2016–2020	Toulouse	80	(2)
2020–2023	PSV	89	(9)
2023–	Nottingham Forest	63	(2)

International career^{‡}
2015	Ivory Coast U20	3	(0)
2015–2021	Ivory Coast U23	2	(0)
2015–	Ivory Coast	63	(12)
Medal record
Representing Ivory Coast
Men's football
Africa Cup of Nations
Winner	2023 Ivory Coast
- * Club domestic league appearances and goals as of 18:26, 18 October 2026 (UTC) ‡ National team caps and goals as of 21:06, 3 October 2026 (UTC)

Ibrahim Sangaré (born 2 December 1997) is an Ivorian professional footballer who plays as a defensive midfielder for Premier League club Nottingham Forest and the Ivory Coast national team.

== Club career ==
=== Early career ===
Sangaré started his youth career with Ivorian clubs Tout Puissant Koumassi and AS Denguélé.

=== Toulouse ===
Sangaré made his debut for Ligue 1 club Toulouse in a 0–0 draw against Angers on 22 October 2016.

=== PSV ===
On 28 September 2020, following Toulouse's relegation to Ligue 2, Sangaré joined Eredivisie club PSV Eindhoven on a five-year deal. On 18 October, he made his debut for the club as a starter in a 3–0 win over PEC Zwolle. On 31 January 2021, Sangaré scored his first goal for PSV in a 3–1 loss to Feyenoord.

On 3 December 2021, Sangaré was named the Eredivisie player of the month for November 2021. He was also included in the team of the month for October 2021 and December 2021 respectively.

On 17 April 2022, Sangaré started in PSV's triumph over rivals Ajax in the KNVB Cup Final.

On 7 August 2022, amid interest from several top European clubs, PSV announced that Sangaré had extended his contract with the club until 2027. On 16 August 2022, Sangaré scored in a 2–2 draw away to Rangers in the first leg of their UEFA Champions League play-off round match. On 2 March 2023, Sangaré scored in the quarter-finals of the KNVB Cup in a 3–1 win over ADO Den Haag. His shot registered in at 170 km/h, making it one of the most powerful shots in recorded football history. On 30 April, he started in the KNVB Cup final against Ajax, where after drawing 1–1 in regular and extra time, PSV won their 10th title after going 3–2 on penalties. On 22 August, Sangaré scored in a 2–2 draw away to Rangers in the first leg of their UEFA Champions League play-off round match.

=== Nottingham Forest ===
On 1 September 2023, Sangaré joined Premier League club Nottingham Forest on a five-year contract, for £30 million. On 18 September, he made his debut for the club in a 1–1 home draw against Burnley at the City Ground.

== International career ==
Sangaré represented Ivory Coast U20 at the 2015 Toulon Tournament, and the Ivory Coast U23s in 2 friendlies.

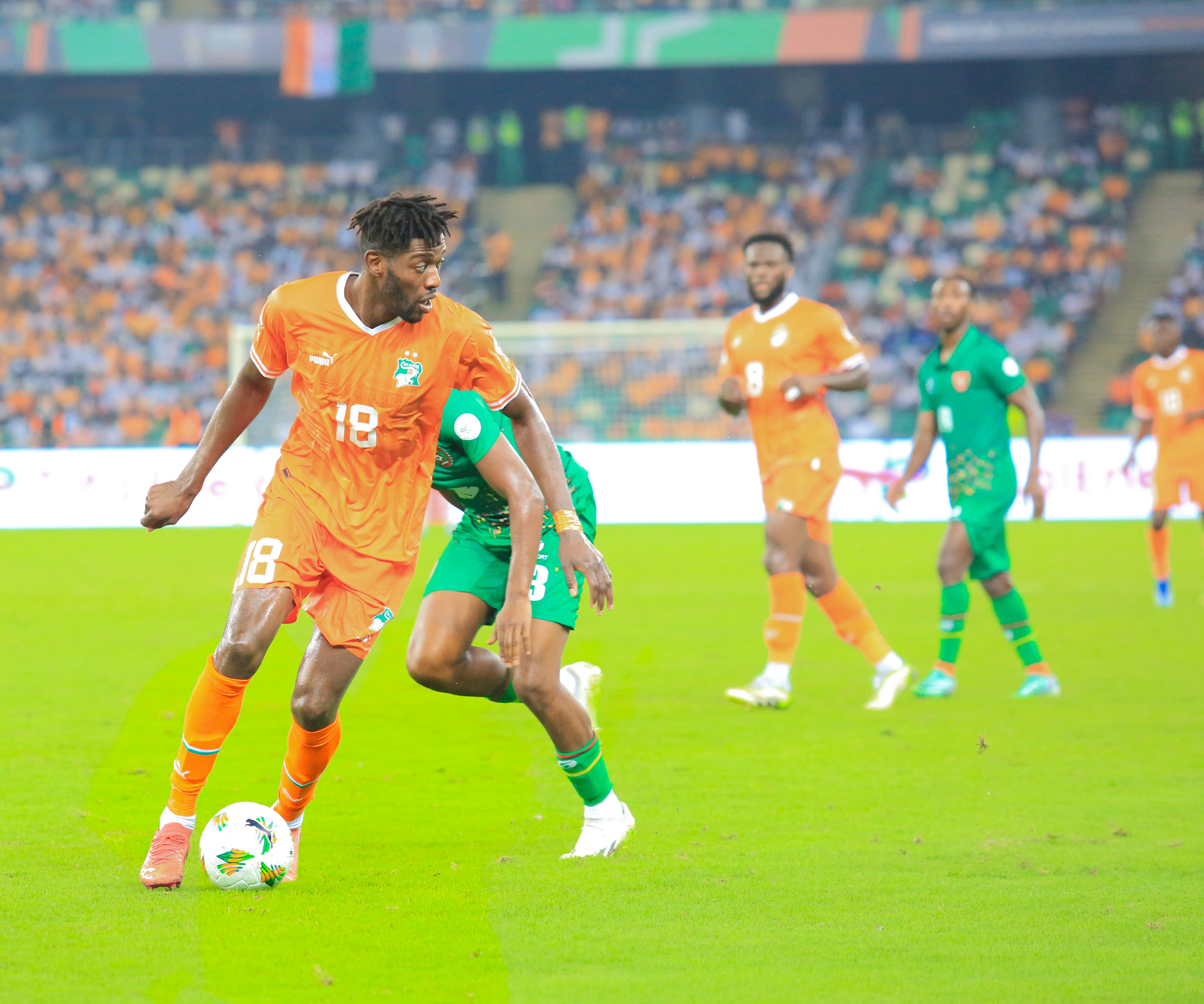
Sangaré (left) with Ivory Coast in 2024

On 28 December 2023, he was included in the Ivory Coast's squad for the 2023 Africa Cup of Nations held in his home country. On 11 February 2024, he came on as a late substitute in the final of the tournament against Nigeria, which ended in a 2–1 victory for Ivory Coast.

Sangaré was included in the list of Ivorian players selected by coach Emerse Faé to participate in the 2025 Africa Cup of Nations.

On May 15, 2026, Sangaré was selected by Ivory Coast coach Emerse Faé in his list of 26 players in order to participate in the 2026 World Cup.

== Career statistics ==
=== Club ===
As of match played 18 October 2026

Appearances and goals by club, season and competition
Club	Season	League			National cup (Note: Includes Coupe de France, KNVB Cup, FA Cup)		League cup (Note: Includes Coupe de la Ligue, EFL Cup)		Continental		Other		Total	
Club	Season	Division	Apps	Goals	Apps	Goals	Apps	Goals	Apps	Goals	Apps	Goals	Apps	Goals
Toulouse II	2016–17	CFA 2	12	0	–		–		–		–		12	0
Toulouse II	2017–18	Championnat National 3	4	0	–		–		–		–		4	0
Toulouse II	Total		16	0	0	0	0	0	0	0	0	0	16	0
Toulouse	2016–17	Ligue 1	5	0	0	0	1	0	–		–		6	0
Toulouse	2017–18	Ligue 1	20	1	1	0	1	0	–		2 (Note: Appearances in Ligue 1 relegation play-offs)	0	24	1
Toulouse	2018–19	Ligue 1	28	1	0	0	0	0	–		–		28	1
Toulouse	2019–20	Ligue 1	25	0	0	0	1	0	–		–		26	0
Toulouse	2020–21	Ligue 2	2	0	—		—		–		–		2	0
Toulouse	Total		80	2	1	0	3	0	0	0	2	0	86	2
PSV Eindhoven	2020–21	Eredivisie	29	1	3	0	–		7 (Note: Appearances in UEFA Europa League)	0	–		39	1
PSV Eindhoven	2021–22	Eredivisie	29	3	4	0	–		15 (Note: Six appearances in UEFA Champions League, four appearances and one goal in UEFA Europa League, five appearances in UEFA Europa Conference League)	1	1 (Note: Appearance in Johan Cruyff Shield)	0	49	4
PSV Eindhoven	2022–23	Eredivisie	29	5	5	1	–		10 (Note: Four appearances and one goal in UEFA Champions League, six appearances and one goal in UEFA Europa League)	2	1	0	45	8
PSV Eindhoven	2023–24	Eredivisie	2	0	—		–		4 (Note: Appearance in UEFA Champions League)	2	1	0	7	2
PSV Eindhoven	Total		89	9	12	1	0	0	36	5	3	0	140	15
Nottingham Forest	2023–24	Premier League	17	0	0	0	—		–		–		17	0
Nottingham Forest	2024–25	Premier League	13	0	3	0	1	0	–		–		17	0
Nottingham Forest	2025–26	Premier League	28	2	0	0	1	0	14	0	–		43	2
Nottingham Forest	2026–27	Premier League	5	0	0	0	0	0	–		–		5	0
Nottingham Forest	Total		63	2	3	0	2	0	14	0	0	0	82	2
Career total			248	13	16	1	5	0	50	5	5	0	324	19

=== International ===
As of match played 3 October 2026

Appearances and goals by national team and year
National team	Year	Apps	Goals
Ivory Coast	2015	2	1
Ivory Coast	2019	5	0
Ivory Coast	2020	1	0
Ivory Coast	2021	9	2
Ivory Coast	2022	11	5
Ivory Coast	2023	7	3
Ivory Coast	2024	7	0
Ivory Coast	2025	11	1
Ivory Coast	2026	10	0
Total		63	12

Scores and results list Ivory Coast's goal tally first.

List of international goals scored by Ibrahim Sangaré
No.	Date	Venue	Opponent	Score	Result	Competition
1	18 October 2015	Baba Yara Stadium, Kumasi, Ghana	Ghana	1–0	1–2	2016 African Nations Championship qualification
2	5 June 2021	Stade National, Abidjan, Ivory Coast	Burkina Faso	1–1	2–1	Friendly
3	8 October 2021	Orlando Stadium, Johannesburg, South Africa	Malawi	2–0	3–0	2022 FIFA World Cup qualification
4	20 January 2022	Japoma Stadium, Douala, Cameroon	Algeria	2–0	3–1	2021 Africa Cup of Nations
5	3 June 2022	Stade de Yamoussoukro, Yamoussoukro, Ivory Coast	Zambia	3–0	3–1	2023 Africa Cup of Nations qualification
6	27 September 2022	Stade de la Licorne, Amiens, France	Guinea	1–0	3–1	Friendly
7	16 November 2022	Stade de Marrakech, Marrakesh, Morocco	Burundi	3–0	4–0	Friendly
8	19 November 2022	Stade de Marrakech, Marrakesh, Morocco	Burkina Faso	1–1	1–2	Friendly
9	28 March 2023	Stade Omnisports de Malouzini, Moroni, Comoros	Comoros	1–0	2–0	2023 Africa Cup of Nations qualification
10	9 September 2023	Laurent Pokou Stadium, San Pédro, Ivory Coast	Lesotho	1–0	1–0	2023 Africa Cup of Nations qualification
11	17 November 2023	Alassane Ouattara Stadium, Abidjan, Ivory Coast	Seychelles	2–0	9–0	2026 FIFA World Cup qualification
12	10 October 2025	Côte d'Or National Sports Complex, Saint Pierre, Mauritius	Seychelles	1–0	7–0	2026 FIFA World Cup qualification

== Honours ==
PSV

- KNVB Cup: 2021–22, 2022–23
- Johan Cruyff Shield: 2021, 2022, 2023

Ivory Coast U23

- Africa U-23 Cup of Nations runner-up: 2019

Ivory Coast

- Africa Cup of Nations: 2023

Individual

- Eredivisie Player of the Month: November 2021
- Eredivisie Team of the Month: November 2021, December 2021
