= John Keister (footballer, born 1988) =

Sierra Leonean footballer (born 1988)

Personal information
- Date of birth: January 1, 1988 (age 38)
- Place of birth: Freetown, Sierra Leone
- Height: 1.82 m (5 ft 11 1/2 in)
- Position: Striker

Team information
- Current team: PK-37

Senior career*
Years	Team	Apps	(Gls)
–2003	Giants FC	?	(?)
2005–2007	HJK Helsinki	5	(0)
2008–	PK-37	?	(?)

International career
- Sierra Leone
- * Club domestic league appearances and goals

John Keister (born 1 January 1988 in Freetown, Sierra Leone) Is a Sierra Leonean footballer. He is an offensive midfielder and plays for PK-37 in the Finnish third tier of football, Kakkonen.

Keister was a member of Sierra Leone U-17 squad at the 2003 FIFA U-17 World Championship in Finland.
