= Franck Kessié =

Ivorian footballer (born 1996)

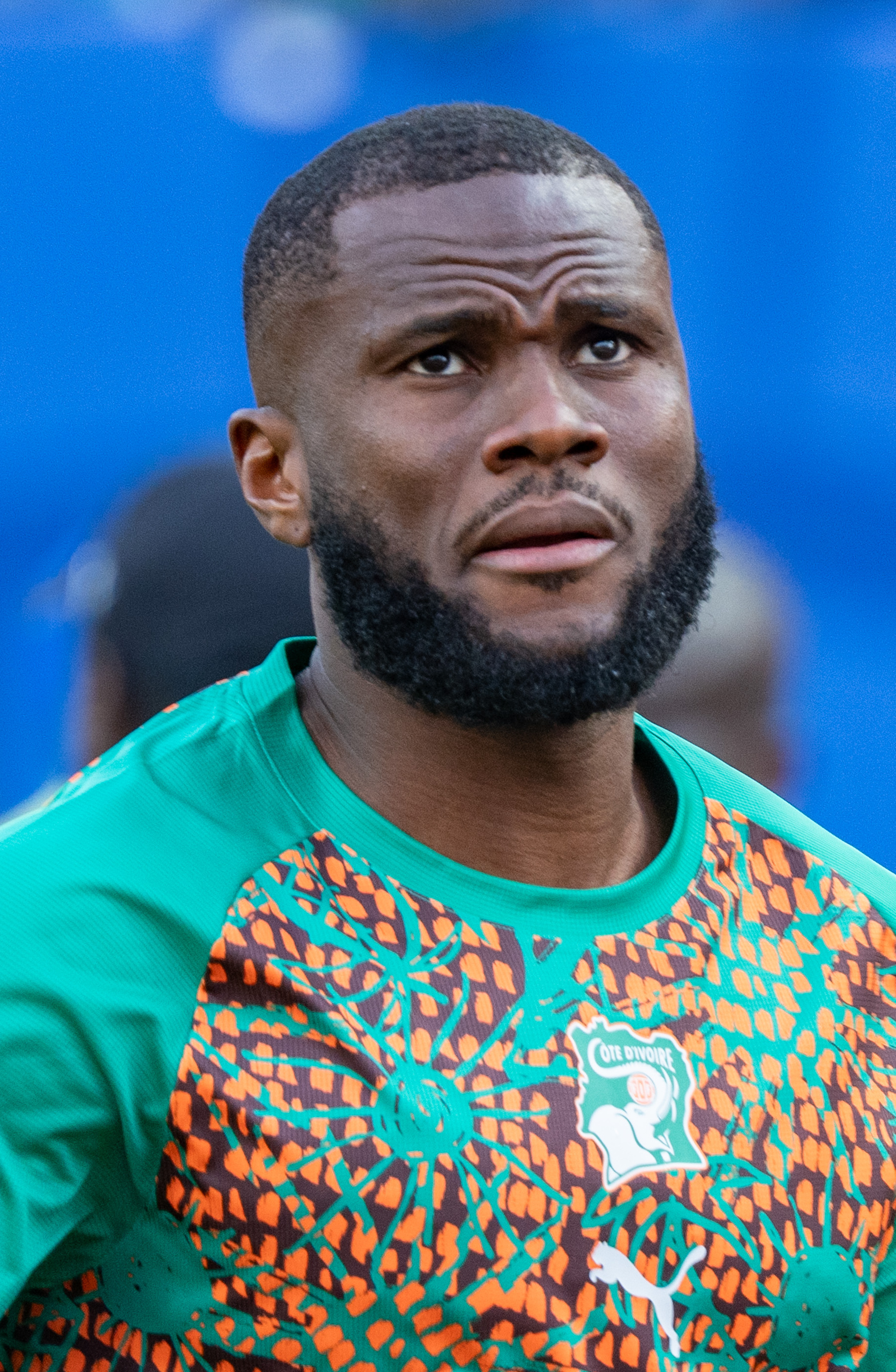
- Kessié with the Ivory Coast in 2026

Personal information
- Full name: Franck Yannick Kessié
- Date of birth: 19 December 1996 (age 29)
- Place of birth: Ouragahio, Ivory Coast
- Height: 1.83 m (6 ft 0 in)
- Position: Midfielder

Team information
- Current team: Atalanta
- Number: 19

Youth career
- 2010–2014: Stella Club
- 2014–2015: Atalanta

Senior career*
Years	Team	Apps	(Gls)
2014	Stella Club	10	(3)
2015–2019	Atalanta	30	(6)
2015–2016	→ Cesena (loan)	37	(4)
2017–2019	→ AC Milan (loan)	71	(12)
2019–2022	AC Milan	103	(23)
2022–2023	Barcelona	28	(1)
2023–2026	Al-Ahli	87	(17)
2026–	Atalanta	6	(2)

International career^{‡}
2013	Ivory Coast U17	5	(0)
2015	Ivory Coast U20	4	(0)
2021	Ivory Coast Olympic	4	(1)
2014–	Ivory Coast	108	(17)
Medal record
Men's football
Representing Ivory Coast
Africa Cup of Nations
Winner	2023 Ivory Coast
- * Club domestic league appearances and goals as of 18:26, 22 November 2026 (UTC) ‡ National team caps and goals as of 24 September 2026

Franck Yannick Kessié (born 19 December 1996) is an Ivorian professional footballer who plays as a midfielder for Serie A club Atalanta and captains the Ivory Coast national team. A versatile player, Kessié plays predominantly as a box-to-box central midfielder, but has also been deployed as a defensive midfielder and on rare occasions, a centre-back.

After advancing through Atalanta, Kessié joined AC Milan in 2017 on loan, securing a permanent move two years later and playing a pivotal role in their Serie A success in the 2021–22 season. In 2022, he joined Barcelona, clinching titles in La Liga and Supercopa de España, before his transfer to Al-Ahli in 2023.

An Ivorian international since 2014, Kessié was part of the squad that won the 2023 Africa Cup of Nations on home soil.

== Club career ==
Born in Ouragahio, Kessié began his career in Stella Club d'Adjamé, joining their youth setup in 2010. In 2014, he was promoted to the first team.

=== Atalanta ===
On 29 January 2015, Kessié signed a three-year contract with Serie A club Atalanta. He was assigned to the club's Primavera squad upon his arrival and contributed with seven appearances for the side. His first match in Europe occurred on 1 March, as he started in a 2–0 away win against AC Milan Primavera.

On 18 April 2015, Kessié was called up to the first team for a match against Roma, but remained an unused substitute in the 1–1 draw the following day.

==== Cesena (loan) ====
On 26 August 2015, Kessié joined Cesena in the Serie B on a one-year loan deal. He made his professional debut on 26 September, coming on as a substitute for Antonino Ragusa in a 0–0 away draw against Perugia.

Kessié scored his first professional goal on 31 October 2015, netting the last in a 2–0 home win against Virtus Lanciano. He became an undisputed starter afterwards, appearing in 37 matches and scoring four goals as his side missed out promotion in the play-offs.

==== Back to Atalanta ====
After returning from loan, Kessié was promoted to the first team by manager Gian Piero Gasperini. After appearing with the main squad during the pre-season, he made his debut for La Dea on 13 August 2016, starting and scoring the last in a 3–0 Coppa Italia home win against Cremonese. Six days later, he renewed his contract until 2021.

Kessié made his debut in the main category of Italian football on 21 August 2016, as he started and scored a brace in a 4–3 home loss against Lazio. He scored another goal seven days later, in a 2–1 away defeat to Sampdoria.

Kessié subsequently became a mainstay in Gasperini's starting eleven, scoring the winners against Torino (2–1 home win) and Roma (2–1 home win), both through penalties. He also scored the equalizer against Empoli on 20 December 2016, with Marco D'Alessandro scoring a last-minute winner.

=== AC Milan ===
On 2 June 2017, Kessié joined fellow Serie A side AC Milan on a two-year loan deal with the obligation to buy. Originally, he chose 19 as his shirt number but soon was persuaded by the club's management to leave it for Leonardo Bonucci, who transferred to Milan a few weeks later; as a result, Kessié changed it to 79.

He made his debut for Milan and helped the club to win the first leg of Europa League qualification match against CS U Craiova on 27 July. On 20 August 2017, in Milan's opening Serie A match of the season, he scored a penalty in a 3–0 victory over Crotone. In a match against Cagliari on 21 January 2018, Kessié scored two goals, one being from the penalty spot, to give Milan the win. Milan reached the Coppa Italia final, but lost 4–0 to Juventus, Kessié playing the full game. Following Bonucci's departure he was offered his original shirt number back yet refused, citing that he did not want to force Milan fans to spend any extra money on his personalized shirts due to yet another number change. As Juventus won the league-cup double, Milan qualified for the 2018 Supercoppa Italiana final against Juventus. They lost 1–0 and Kessié was sent off in the 74th minute.

Milan finished the 2020–21 Serie A season in second place, with Kessié scoring 13 times in 37 appearances, and qualified for the 2021–22 UEFA Champions League after an eight-year absence. Kessie became the first player to score at least ten penalties for AC Milan in a Serie A season since Zlatan Ibrahimovic in 2011–12; he played 50 matches this season in all competitions, a record between Serie A players with Politano, and was described as player of the season for Milan by some critics.

==== 2021–22: Scudetto winner and departure ====
On 12 September 2021, Kessié won a penalty kick against Lazio but failed to convert it; Milan still managed to win the match 2–0. On 28 September, in a UEFA Champions League match against Atlético Madrid, as Milan was leading by 1–0, Kessié was sent off in the 29th minute, his side eventually lost 1–2. On 31 October against Roma, he converted a penalty kick to score the second and seal a 2–1 victory for Milan. On 7 November, while playing against Inter he fouled Hakan Çalhanoğlu in the penalty box, causing a penalty kick which the latter scored in a 1–1 draw.

On 4 December, Kessié scored the first goal against Salernitana in an eventual 2–0 win. On 22 December, Kessié scored a brace against Empoli, reaching 14 Serie A goals during the 2021 calendar year; the last AC Milan midfielder to score so much in a single calendar year was Kaká in 2008.

On 22 May 2022, Kessié scored the third goal in a 3–0 rout against Sassuolo, sealing the Scudetto title for the club; after the goal, Kessié went to Milan fans at the Mapei Stadium and did his trademark salute, it was Kessié's last match and goal with Milan, as he announced his departure a few days later and thanked the fans.

=== Barcelona ===
On 4 July 2022, Barcelona announced that they had reached an agreement with Kessié after his contract expired with AC Milan and on 6 July, he signed a four-year deal until 30 June 2026, and his buy out was set at €500m.

On 13 August 2022, he made his debut for the club, as a substitute to Pedri, in a 0–0 draw against Rayo Vallecano in the league. On 19 March 2023, Kessié scored the winning goal against Real Madrid in El Clasico, his first for the club, hitting home Alejandro Balde's cutback in the 92nd minute to make it 2–1 for the Blaugrana. Kessié's strike was the 3,000th goal scored by Barcelona at the Camp Nou in La Liga.

=== Al-Ahli ===
On 9 August 2023, Kessié joined Saudi Pro League club Al-Ahli in a €12.5m deal. He scored his first goal for the club in a 1–0 win over Al-Okhdood on 24 August. Kessié also scored another winning goal in a 1–0 win over Al-Khaleej on 29 December.

During the 2024–25 AFC Champions League Elite on 16 September 2024, Kessié scored the only goal in the match against Iranian club Persepolis to secured the 3 points for Al-Ahli. In the final match held in Jeddah on 3 May 2025, he won the competition, after previously scoring a goal in the 42nd minute when defeating the Japanese representative, Kawasaki Frontale. In the following season, he was named the Most Valuable Player in the 2025–26 AFC Champions League Elite as his club secured a 1–0 extra-time victory over Machida Zelvia in the final. He departed the club at the conclusion of the 2025–26 season.

=== Return to Atalanta ===
On 29 August 2026, Kessié rejoined Serie A club Atalanta, signing a multi-year contract as a free agent.

== International career ==
=== Youth ===
Kessié represented Ivory Coast at under-17 and under-20 levels, appearing in the 2013 FIFA U-17 World Cup and 2015 Toulon Tournament. During the former tournament, the Royal Moroccan Football Federation submitted a complaint to FIFA claiming that Kessié was aged 22 and not 16; FIFA later denied that claim.

=== Senior ===
At the age of 17, Kessié played his first international game with the senior national team on 6 September 2014, starting in a 2–1 home win against Sierra Leone for the 2015 Africa Cup of Nations qualification. On 4 January 2017, he was included in Michel Dussuyer's 23-man squad ahead of the 2017 Africa Cup of Nations, starting in all matches as his side was knocked out in the group stage.

At the 2019 Africa Cup of Nations, he finished as the joint-top assist provider of the tournament, alongside Ismaël Bennacer, with three assists. His team were eliminated in the quarter-finals by eventual champions Algeria after losing 4–3 on penalties following a 1–1 draw on 11 July; Kessié converted his nation's first penalty in the shoot-out.

Kessié started in all four of the Ivory Coast's matches at the 2021 Africa Cup of Nations, scoring once in a 3–1 win over Algeria in Group E. He was substituted with an injury 30 minutes into the round of 16 loss to Egypt.

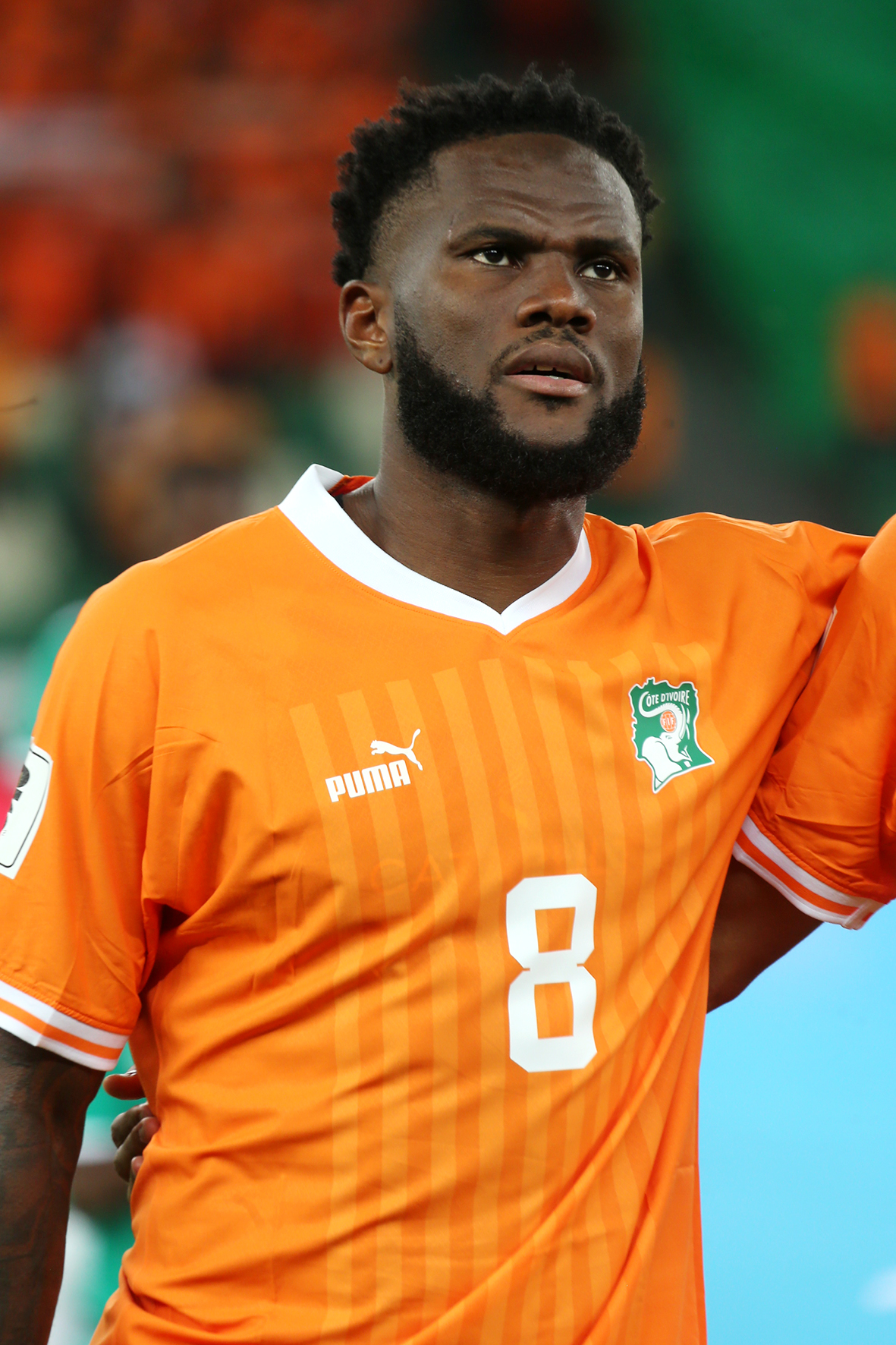
Kessié with Ivory Coast in 2024

In December 2023, Kessié was named in the Ivory Coast's squad for the 2023 Africa Cup of Nations. He captained the team in the tournament's opening match, a 2–0 win over Guinea-Bissau on 14 January 2024. During the round of 16 match against defending champions Senegal, he came off the bench in the second half, in which he managed to score the equalizer from a penalty in the 86th minute in a 1–1 tie. He eventually netted the last penalty in the shoot-outs in a 5–4 win, which qualified his country to the quarter-finals. He later scored a goal in the final match against Nigeria which ended in a 2–1 victory.

Kessié later became the captain of his national team in 2024, succeeding Max-Alain Gradel. On 6 January 2026, he made his 100th international appearance in a 3–0 win over Burkina Faso during the 2025 Africa Cup of Nations round of 16.

On 15 May 2026, Kessié was integrated by Ivory Coast coach Emerse Faé in his list of 26 players in order to participate in the 2026 World Cup. He scored his first World Cup goal, opening the scoring in a 2–1 defeat against Germany in the second group-stage match.

== Personal life ==
When Kessié was 11 years old, his father, who used to be a professional footballer in his youth before enlisting in the Ivorian army, died due to an illness. Therefore, one of his goal celebrations is a military salute performed in order to pay tribute to his late father. Growing up, his idol was Yaya Touré.

Kessié is a practicing Muslim. He regularly fasts during Ramadan while playing matches.

== Career statistics ==
=== Club ===
As of match played 22 November 2026

Appearances and goals by club, season and competition
Club	Season	League			National cup (Note: Includes Coppa Italia, Copa del Rey, King's Cup)		Continental		Other		Total	
Club	Season	Division	Apps	Goals	Apps	Goals	Apps	Goals	Apps	Goals	Apps	Goals
Cesena (loan)	2015–16	Serie B	37	4	0	0	—		—		37	4
Atalanta	2016–17	Serie A	30	6	1	1	—		—		31	7
AC Milan (loan)	2017–18	Serie A	37	5	5	0	12 (Note: Appearances in UEFA Europa League)	0	—		54	5
AC Milan (loan)	2018–19	Serie A	34	7	4	0	3	0	1 (Note: Appearance in Supercoppa Italiana)	0	42	7
AC Milan	2019–20	Serie A	35	4	3	0	—		—		38	4
AC Milan	2020–21	Serie A	37	13	2	0	11	1	—		50	14
AC Milan	2021–22	Serie A	31	6	3	1	5 (Note: Appearances in UEFA Champions League)	0	—		39	7
AC Milan	Milan total		174	35	17	1	31	1	1	0	223	37
Barcelona	2022–23	La Liga	28	1	5	1	8 (Note: Six appearances and one goal in UEFA Champions League, two appearances in UEFA Europa League)	1	2 (Note: Appearances in Supercopa de España)	0	43	3
Al-Ahli	2023–24	Saudi Pro League	31	10	2	0	—		—		33	10
Al-Ahli	2024–25	Saudi Pro League	30	2	1	0	12 (Note: Appearances in AFC Champions League Elite)	2	1 (Note: Appearance in Saudi Super Cup)	0	44	4
Al-Ahli	2025–26	Saudi Pro League	26	5	3	1	10	3	3 (Note: Two appearances and three goals in Saudi Super Cup, one appearance in FIFA Intercontinental Cup)	3	42	12
Al-Ahli	Total		87	17	6	1	22	5	4	3	119	26
Atalanta	2026–27	Serie A	6	2	0	0	0	0	—		6	2
Career total			362	65	29	4	61	7	7	3	459	79

=== International ===
As of match played 24 September 2026

Appearances and goals by national team and year
National team	Year	Apps	Goals
Ivory Coast	2014	5	0
Ivory Coast	2015	0	0
Ivory Coast	2016	6	0
Ivory Coast	2017	13	0
Ivory Coast	2018	5	0
Ivory Coast	2019	12	1
Ivory Coast	2020	4	2
Ivory Coast	2021	8	2
Ivory Coast	2022	8	2
Ivory Coast	2023	8	1
Ivory Coast	2024	18	5
Ivory Coast	2025	12	2
Ivory Coast	2026	9	2
Total		108	17

Scores and results list Ivory Coast's goal tally first.

International goals by date, venue, opponent, score, result and competition
No.	Date	Venue	Opponent	Score	Result	Competition
1	16 November 2019	Stade Félix Houphouët-Boigny, Abidjan, Ivory Coast	Niger	1–0	1–0	2021 Africa Cup of Nations qualification
2	8 October 2020	King Baudouin Stadium, Brussels, Belgium	Belgium	1–1	1–1	Friendly
3	17 November 2020	Barikadimy Stadium, Toamasina, Madagascar	Madagascar	1–0	1–1	2021 Africa Cup of Nations qualification
4	30 March 2021	Stade National, Abidjan, Ivory Coast	Ethiopia	2–0	3–1	2021 Africa Cup of Nations qualification
5	11 October 2021	Stade de l'Amitie, Cotonou, Benin	Malawi	2–1	2–1	2022 FIFA World Cup qualification
6	20 January 2022	Japoma Stadium, Douala, Cameroon	Algeria	1–0	3–1	2021 Africa Cup of Nations
7	24 September 2022	Stade Robert Diochon, Rouen, France	Togo	2–0	2–1	Friendly
8	28 March 2023	Stade Omnisports de Malouzini, Moroni, Comoros	Comoros	2–0	2–0	2023 Africa Cup of Nations qualification
9	6 January 2024	Laurent Pokou Stadium, San-Pédro, Ivory Coast	Sierra Leone	2–0	5–1	Friendly
10	29 January 2024	Charles Konan Banny Stadium, Yamoussoukro, Ivory Coast	Senegal	1–1	1–1 (a.e.t.)	2023 Africa Cup of Nations
11	11 February 2024	Alassane Ouattara Stadium, Abidjan, Ivory Coast	Nigeria	1–1	2–1	2023 Africa Cup of Nations
12	11 October 2024	Laurent Pokou Stadium, San-Pédro, Ivory Coast	Sierra Leone	1–1	4–1	2025 Africa Cup of Nations qualification
13	11 October 2024	Laurent Pokou Stadium, San-Pédro, Ivory Coast	Sierra Leone	2–1	4–1	2025 Africa Cup of Nations qualification
14	10 October 2025	Côte d'Or National Sports Complex, Saint Pierre, Mauritius	Seychelles	7–0	7–0	2026 FIFA World Cup qualification
15	14 October 2025	Alassane Ouattara Stadium, Abidjan, Ivory Coast	Kenya	1–0	3–0	2026 FIFA World Cup qualification
16	20 June 2026	BMO Field, Toronto, Canada	Germany	1–0	1–2	2026 FIFA World Cup
17	24 September 2026	Bouaké Stadium, Bouaké, Ivory Coast	Ghana	2–0	2–0	2027 Africa Cup of Nations qualification

== Honours ==
AC Milan

- Serie A: 2021–22

Barcelona

- La Liga: 2022–23
- Supercopa de España: 2023

Al-Ahli

- AFC Champions League Elite: 2024–25, 2025–26
- Saudi Super Cup: 2025

Ivory Coast

- Africa Cup of Nations: 2023

Individual

- Africa Cup of Nations top assist provider: 2019
- Africa Cup of Nations Team of the Tournament: 2023
- Serie A Team of the Year: 2020–21
- CAF Team of the Year: 2024
- AFC Champions League Elite Most Valuable Player: 2025–26

== See also ==
- List of men's footballers with 100 or more international caps
