= John Keister (footballer, born 1970) =

Footballer (born 1970)

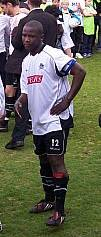
- Keister in 2009

Personal information
- Date of birth: 11 November 1970 (age 55)
- Place of birth: Manchester, England
- Positions: Sweeper; midfielder

Team information
- Current team: Bo Rangers (Head coach)

Senior career*
Years	Team	Apps	(Gls)
1992–1993	Tigres		
1993–2000	Walsall	106	(2)
2000	Chester City	10	(0)
2000–2001	Shrewsbury Town	8	(0)
2001	Stevenage Borough		
2001–2006	Margate	186	(22)
2006–2009	Dover Athletic	97	(3)
2009–2011	Margate	3	(0)

International career
2000–2002	Sierra Leone	7	(0)

Managerial career
- 2017–2019: Sierra Leone
- 2020–2023: Sierra Leone
- 2023–: Bo Rangers
- * Club domestic league appearances and goals

John Keister (born 11 November 1970) is a football coach and former professional player. Born in England, he played for the Sierra Leone national team during his career and served as its head coach from 2020 to 2023.

== Career ==
Keister started his career at Sierra Leone side Tigres in 1992 before moving to England in 1993. Since living in England he has played for Walsall, Chester City, Shrewsbury Town, Stevenage Borough, Margate and Dover Athletic where he was captain before returning to previous club Margate on a free transfer in September 2009.

Whilst playing for non-league club Margate he gained two international caps for Sierra Leone. He played in two World Cup qualifying games against Nigeria and Morocco, making him the first player from the club to receive international recognition whilst playing for them.

Keister was player-assistant manager at the club but left in February 2011.

Following a spell at FC Johansen, he was appointed as manager of the Sierra Leone national team in 2017. After leaving the post in 2019, he was reappointed in August 2020.
