= List of FIFA World Cup penalty shoot-outs =

This is a list of all penalty shoot-outs that have taken place in the final tournaments of the FIFA World Cup.

For knockout matches tied after regulation and extra time, the first editions of the FIFA World Cup up until 1958 used the rule of replaying the game. With fixtures becoming increasingly crowded, drawn matches from 1962 in quarter-finals and semi-finals would have been decided by drawing of lots (although no games ever required drawing of lots to determine a winner). Replacement of the rules was first proposed in 1970 to the IFAB, and penalty shoot-outs were adopted for the new format of the 1978 tournament, although the replay rule for the final matches remained in place until 1982.

In practice, penalty shoot-outs did not occur before 1982. Three times, in 1994, 2006, and 2022, the World Cup title has been decided by a penalty shoot-out. Of the 39 shoot-outs that have taken place in the competition, only three reached the sudden death stage after still being tied at the end of five kicks. Three times the shoot-outs required only 7 kicks, compared to the theoretical minimum of 6 kicks necessary.

== Penalty shoot-outs ==
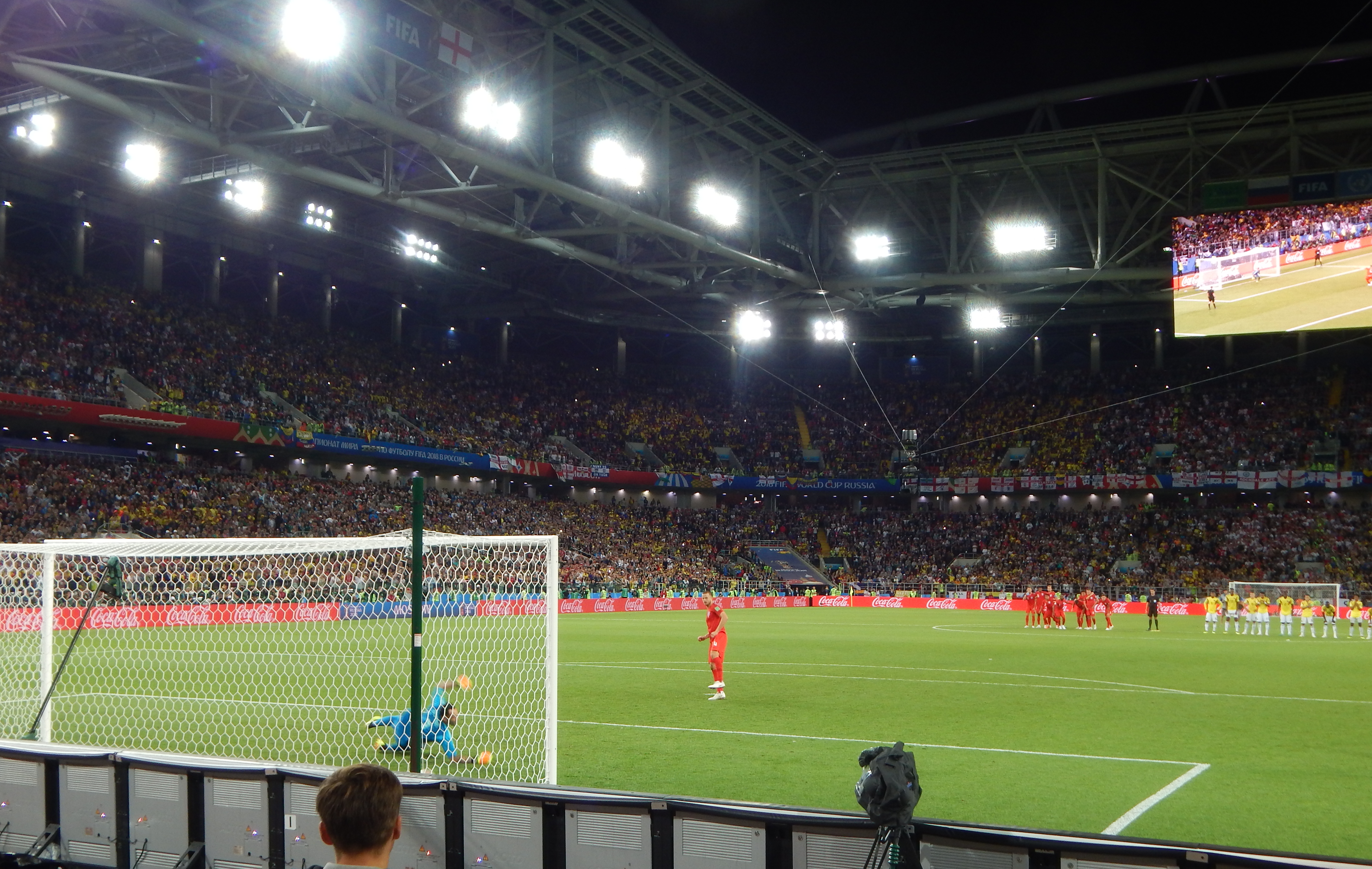
2018 World Cup: Eric Dier scores the winning goal in England's first World Cup penalty shoot-out victory. The team had lost three times before.

Key

- (penalty scored) = scored penalty
- (penalty missed) = missed penalty
- golden background = scored penalty ending the shoot-out
- red background = missed penalty ending the shoot-out
- grey background = first penalty in the shoot-out
- horizontal line within a list of takers = beginning of the sudden death stage

Penalty shoot-outs in the Men's FIFA World Cup
#	Event	Round	Winner	F	Loser	Penalties			Winning team		Losing team		Date	Venue		R
#	Event	Round	Winner	F	Loser	S	M	T	GK	Takers	Takers	GK	Date	City	Stadium	R
1.	1982, Spain	Semi-finals	West Germany	3–3	France	5–4	1–2	6–6	Schumacher	Kaltz (penalty scored); Breitner (penalty scored); Stielike (penalty missed); Littbarski (penalty scored); Rummenigge (penalty scored) Hrubesch (penalty scored)	(penalty scored) Giresse; (penalty scored) Amoros; (penalty scored) Rocheteau; (penalty missed) Six; (penalty scored) Platini (penalty missed) Bossis	Ettori	8 July	Seville	Pizjuán	
2.	1986, Mexico	Quarter-finals	France	1–1	Brazil	4–3	1–2	5–5	Bats	Stopyra (penalty scored); Amoros (penalty scored); Bellone (penalty scored); Platini (penalty missed); Fernández (penalty scored)	(penalty missed) Sócrates; (penalty scored) Alemão; (penalty scored) Zico; (penalty scored) Branco; (penalty missed) Júlio César	Carlos	21 June	Guadalajara	Jalisco	
3.	1986, Mexico	Quarter-finals	West Germany	0–0	Mexico	4–1	0–2	4–3	Schumacher	Allofs (penalty scored); Brehme (penalty scored); Matthäus (penalty scored); Littbarski (penalty scored)	(penalty scored) Negrete; (penalty missed) Quirarte; (penalty missed) Servín	Larios	21 June	San Nicolás	Universitario	
4.	1986, Mexico	Quarter-finals	Belgium	1–1	Spain	5–4	0–1	5–5	Pfaff	Claesen (penalty scored); Scifo (penalty scored); Broos (penalty scored); Vervoort (penalty scored); L. Van der Elst (penalty scored)	(penalty scored) Señor; (penalty missed) Eloy; (penalty scored) Chendo; (penalty scored) Butragueño; (penalty scored) Víctor	Zubizarreta	22 June	Puebla	Cuauhtémoc	
5.	1990, Italy	Round of 16	Republic of Ireland	0–0	Romania	5–4	0–1	5–5	Bonner	Sheedy (penalty scored); Houghton (penalty scored); Townsend (penalty scored); Cascarino (penalty scored); O'Leary (penalty scored)	(penalty scored) Hagi; (penalty scored) Lupu; (penalty scored) Rotariu; (penalty scored) Lupescu; (penalty missed) Timofte	Lung	25 June	Genoa	Ferraris	
6.	1990, Italy	Quarter-finals	Argentina	0–0	Yugoslavia	3–2	2–3	5–5	Goycochea	Serrizuela (penalty scored); Burruchaga (penalty scored); Maradona (penalty missed); Troglio (penalty missed); Dezotti (penalty scored)	(penalty missed) Stojković; (penalty scored) Prosinečki; (penalty scored) Savićević; (penalty missed) Brnović; (penalty missed) Hadžibegić	Ivković	30 June	Florence	Comunale	
7.	1990, Italy	Semi-finals	Argentina	1–1	Italy	4–3	0–2	4–5	Goycochea	Serrizuela (penalty scored); Burruchaga (penalty scored); Olarticoechea (penalty scored); Maradona (penalty scored)	(penalty scored) Baresi; (penalty scored) R. Baggio; (penalty scored) De Agostini; (penalty missed) Donadoni; (penalty missed) Serena	Zenga	3 July	Naples	San Paolo	
8.	1990, Italy	Semi-finals	West Germany	1–1	England	4–3	0–2	4–5	Illgner	Brehme (penalty scored); Matthäus (penalty scored); Riedle (penalty scored); Thon (penalty scored)	(penalty scored) Lineker; (penalty scored) Beardsley; (penalty scored) Platt; (penalty missed) Pearce; (penalty missed) Waddle	Shilton	4 July	Turin	Delle Alpi	
9.	1994, United States	Round of 16	Bulgaria	1–1	Mexico	3–1	1–3	4–4	Mihaylov	Balakov (penalty missed); Genchev (penalty scored); Borimirov (penalty scored); Lechkov (penalty scored)	(penalty missed) García Aspe; (penalty missed) Bernal; (penalty missed) J. Rodríguez; (penalty scored) Suárez	Campos	5 July	East Rutherford	Giants	
10.	1994, United States	Quarter-finals	Sweden	2–2	Romania	5–4	1–2	6–6	Ravelli	Mild (penalty missed); K. Andersson (penalty scored); Brolin (penalty scored); Ingesson (penalty scored); R. Nilsson (penalty scored) Larsson (penalty scored)	(penalty scored) Răducioiu; (penalty scored) Hagi; (penalty scored) Lupescu; (penalty missed) Petrescu; (penalty scored) Dumitrescu (penalty missed) Belodedici	Prunea	10 July	Stanford	Stanford	
11.	1994, United States	Final	Brazil	0–0	Italy	3–2	1–3	4–5	Taffarel	Santos (penalty missed); Romário (penalty scored); Branco (penalty scored); Dunga (penalty scored)	(penalty missed) Baresi; (penalty scored) Albertini; (penalty scored) Evani; (penalty missed) Massaro; (penalty missed) R. Baggio	Pagliuca	17 July	Pasadena	Rose Bowl	
12.	1998, France	Round of 16	Argentina	2–2	England	4–3	1–2	5–5	Roa	Berti (penalty scored); Crespo (penalty missed); Verón (penalty scored); Gallardo (penalty scored); Ayala (penalty scored)	(penalty scored) Shearer; (penalty missed) Ince; (penalty scored) Merson; (penalty scored) Owen; (penalty missed) Batty	Seaman	30 June	Saint-Étienne	Geoffroy-Guichard	
13.	1998, France	Quarter-finals	France	0–0	Italy	4–3	1–2	5–5	Barthez	Zidane (penalty scored); Lizarazu (penalty missed); Trezeguet (penalty scored); Henry (penalty scored); Blanc (penalty scored)	(penalty scored) R. Baggio; (penalty missed) Albertini; (penalty scored) Costacurta; (penalty scored) Vieri; (penalty missed) Di Biagio	Pagliuca	3 July	Saint-Denis	Stade de France	
14.	1998, France	Semi-finals	Brazil	1–1	Netherlands	4–2	0–2	4–4	Taffarel	Ronaldo (penalty scored); Rivaldo (penalty scored); Emerson (penalty scored); Dunga (penalty scored)	(penalty scored) F. de Boer; (penalty scored) Bergkamp; (penalty missed) Cocu; (penalty missed) R. de Boer	Van der Sar	7 July	Marseille	Vélodrome	
15.	2002, South Korea / Japan	Round of 16	Spain	1–1	Republic of Ireland	3–2	2–3	5–5	Casillas	Hierro (penalty scored); Baraja (penalty scored); Juanfran (penalty missed); Valerón (penalty missed); Mendieta (penalty scored)	(penalty scored) Robbie Keane; (penalty missed) Holland; (penalty missed) Connolly; (penalty missed) Kilbane; (penalty scored) Finnan	Given	16 June	Suwon	World Cup St.	
16.	2002, South Korea / Japan	Quarter-finals	South Korea	0–0	Spain	5–3	0–1	5–4	Lee Woon-jae	Hwang Sun-hong (penalty scored); Park Ji-sung (penalty scored); Seol Ki-hyeon (penalty scored); Ahn Jung-hwan (penalty scored); Hong Myung-bo (penalty scored)	(penalty scored) Hierro; (penalty scored) Baraja; (penalty scored) Xavi; (penalty missed) Joaquín	Casillas	22 June	Gwangju	World Cup St.	
17.	2006, Germany	Round of 16	Ukraine	0–0	Switzerland	3–0	1–3	4–3	Shovkovskyi	Shevchenko (penalty missed); Milevskyi (penalty scored); Rebrov (penalty scored); Husyev (penalty scored)	(penalty missed) Streller; (penalty missed) Barnetta; (penalty missed) Cabanas	Zuberbühler	26 June	Cologne	FIFA WM-Stadion	
18.	2006, Germany	Quarter-finals	Germany	1–1	Argentina	4–2	0–2	4–4	Lehmann	Neuville (penalty scored); Ballack (penalty scored); Podolski (penalty scored); Borowski (penalty scored)	(penalty scored) Cruz; (penalty missed) Ayala; (penalty scored) M. Rodríguez; (penalty missed) Cambiasso	Franco	30 June	Berlin	Olympiastadion	
19.	2006, Germany	Quarter-finals	Portugal	0–0	England	3–1	2–3	5–4	Ricardo	Simão (penalty scored); Viana (penalty missed); Petit (penalty missed); Postiga (penalty scored); Ronaldo (penalty scored)	(penalty missed) Lampard; (penalty scored) Hargreaves; (penalty missed) Gerrard; (penalty missed) Carragher	Robinson	1 July	Gelsenkirchen	FIFA WM-Stadion	
20.	2006, Germany	Final	Italy	1–1	France	5–3	0–1	5–4	Buffon	Pirlo (penalty scored); Materazzi (penalty scored); De Rossi (penalty scored); Del Piero (penalty scored); Grosso (penalty scored)	(penalty scored) Wiltord; (penalty missed) Trezeguet; (penalty scored) Abidal; (penalty scored) Sagnol	Barthez	9 July	Berlin	Olympiastadion	
21.	2010, South Africa	Round of 16	Paraguay	0–0	Japan	5–3	0–1	5–4	Villar	Barreto (penalty scored); Barrios (penalty scored); Riveros (penalty scored); Valdez (penalty scored); Cardozo (penalty scored)	(penalty scored) Endō; (penalty scored) Hasebe; (penalty missed) Komano; (penalty scored) Honda	Kawashima	29 June	Pretoria	Loftus Versfeld	
22.	2010, South Africa	Quarter-finals	Uruguay	1–1	Ghana	4–2	1–2	5–4	Muslera	Forlán (penalty scored); Victorino (penalty scored); Scotti (penalty scored); M. Pereira (penalty missed); Abreu (penalty scored)	(penalty scored) Gyan; (penalty scored) Appiah; (penalty missed) Mensah; (penalty missed) Adiyiah	Kingson	2 July	Johannesburg	Soccer City	
23.	2014, Brazil	Round of 16	Brazil	1–1	Chile	3–2	2–3	5–5	Júlio César	David Luiz (penalty scored); Willian (penalty missed); Marcelo (penalty scored); Hulk (penalty missed); Neymar (penalty scored)	(penalty missed) Pinilla; (penalty missed) A. Sánchez; (penalty scored) Aránguiz; (penalty scored) M. Díaz; (penalty missed) Jara	Bravo	28 June	Belo Horizonte	Mineirão	
24.	2014, Brazil	Round of 16	Costa Rica	1–1	Greece	5–3	0–1	5–4	Navas	Borges (penalty scored); Ruiz (penalty scored); González (penalty scored); Campbell (penalty scored); Umaña (penalty scored)	(penalty scored) Mitroglou; (penalty scored) Lazaros; (penalty scored) Holebas; (penalty missed) Gekas	Karnezis	29 June	Recife	Pernambuco	
25.	2014, Brazil	Quarter-finals	Netherlands	0–0	Costa Rica	4–3	0–2	4–5	Krul	Van Persie (penalty scored); Robben (penalty scored); Sneijder (penalty scored); Kuyt (penalty scored)	(penalty scored) Borges; (penalty missed) Ruiz; (penalty scored) González; (penalty scored) Bolaños; (penalty missed) Umaña	Navas	5 July	Salvador	Fonte Nova	
26.	2014, Brazil	Semi-finals	Argentina	0–0	Netherlands	4–2	0–2	4–4	Romero	Messi (penalty scored); Garay (penalty scored); Agüero (penalty scored); M. Rodríguez (penalty scored)	(penalty missed) Vlaar; (penalty scored) Robben; (penalty missed) Sneijder; (penalty scored) Kuyt	Cillessen	9 July	São Paulo	Corinthians	
27.	2018, Russia	Round of 16	Russia	1–1	Spain	4–3	0–2	4–5	Akinfeev	Smolov (penalty scored); Ignashevich (penalty scored); Golovin (penalty scored); Cheryshev (penalty scored)	(penalty scored) Iniesta; (penalty scored) Piqué; (penalty missed) Koke; (penalty scored) Ramos; (penalty missed) Aspas	De Gea	1 July	Moscow	Luzhniki	
28.	2018, Russia	Round of 16	Croatia	1–1	Denmark	3–2	2–3	5–5	Subašić	Badelj (penalty missed); Kramarić (penalty scored); Modrić (penalty scored); Pivarić (penalty missed); Rakitić (penalty scored)	(penalty missed) Eriksen; (penalty scored) Kjær; (penalty scored) Krohn-Dehli; (penalty missed) Schöne; (penalty missed) N. Jørgensen	Schmeichel	1 July	Nizhny Novgorod	Nizhny Novgorod	
29.	2018, Russia	Round of 16	England	1–1	Colombia	4–3	1–2	5–5	Pickford	Kane (penalty scored); Rashford (penalty scored); Henderson (penalty missed); Trippier (penalty scored); Dier (penalty scored)	(penalty scored) Falcao; (penalty scored) Ju. Cuadrado; (penalty scored) Muriel; (penalty missed) Uribe; (penalty missed) Bacca	Ospina	3 July	Moscow	Otkritie	
30.	2018, Russia	Quarter-finals	Croatia	2–2	Russia	4–3	1–2	5–5	Subašić	Brozović (penalty scored); Kovačić (penalty missed); Modrić (penalty scored); Vida (penalty scored); Rakitić (penalty scored)	(penalty missed) Smolov; (penalty scored) Dzagoev; (penalty missed) Fernandes; (penalty scored) Ignashevich; (penalty scored) Kuzyayev	Akinfeev	7 July	Sochi	Fisht	
31.	2022, Qatar	Round of 16	Croatia	1–1	Japan	3–1	1–3	4–4	Livaković	Vlašić (penalty scored); Brozović (penalty scored); Livaja (penalty missed); Pašalić (penalty scored)	(penalty missed) Minamino; (penalty missed) Mitoma; (penalty scored) Asano; (penalty missed) Yoshida	Gonda	5 December	Al Wakrah	Al Janoub	
32.	2022, Qatar	Round of 16	Morocco	0–0	Spain	3–0	1–3	4–3	Bounou	Sabiri (penalty scored); Ziyech (penalty scored); Benoun (penalty missed); Hakimi (penalty scored)	(penalty missed) Sarabia; (penalty missed) Soler; (penalty missed) Busquets	Simón	6 December	Al Rayyan	Education City	
33.	2022, Qatar	Quarter-finals	Croatia	1–1	Brazil	4–2	0–2	4–4	Livaković	Vlašić (penalty scored); Majer (penalty scored); Modrić (penalty scored); Oršić (penalty scored)	(penalty missed) Rodrygo; (penalty scored) Casemiro; (penalty scored) Pedro; (penalty missed) Marquinhos	Becker	9 December	Al Rayyan	Education City	
34.	2022, Qatar	Quarter-finals	Argentina	2–2	Netherlands	4–3	1–2	5–5	E. Martínez	Messi (penalty scored); Paredes (penalty scored); Montiel (penalty scored); Fernández (penalty missed); La. Martínez (penalty scored)	(penalty missed) Van Dijk; (penalty missed) Berghuis; (penalty scored) Koopmeiners; (penalty scored) Weghorst; (penalty scored) L. de Jong	Noppert	9 December	Lusail	Lusail Iconic	
35.	2022, Qatar	Final	Argentina	3–3	France	4–2	0–2	4–4	E. Martínez	Messi (penalty scored); Dybala (penalty scored); Paredes (penalty scored); Montiel (penalty scored)	(penalty scored) Mbappé; (penalty missed) Coman; (penalty missed) Tchouaméni; (penalty scored) Kolo Muani	Lloris	18 December	Lusail	Lusail Iconic	
36.	2026, Canada / Mexico / United States	Round of 32	Paraguay	1–1	Germany	4–3	2–3	6–6	Gill	Maurício (penalty scored); G. Gómez (penalty scored); Galarza (penalty scored); Sanabria (penalty missed); Balbuena (penalty missed) Canale (penalty scored)	(penalty missed) Havertz; (penalty scored) Kimmich; (penalty scored) Musiala; (penalty missed) Woltemade; (penalty scored) Amiri (penalty missed) Tah	Neuer	29 June	Foxborough	Gillette Stadium	
37.	2026, Canada / Mexico / United States	Round of 32	Morocco	1–1	Netherlands	3–2	2–3	5–5	Bounou	El Aynaoui (penalty missed); Rahimi (penalty scored); Talbi (penalty scored); Hakimi (penalty missed); Saibari (penalty scored)	(penalty scored) Koopmeiners; (penalty missed) Kluivert; (penalty scored) Weghorst; (penalty missed) Timber; (penalty missed) Summerville	Verbruggen	29 June	Guadalupe	Estadio BBVA	
38.	2026, Canada / Mexico / United States	Round of 32	Egypt	1–1	Australia	4–2	0–2	4–4	Shobeir	Saber (penalty scored); Rabia (penalty scored); Salah (penalty scored); Abdelmaguid (penalty scored)	(penalty missed) Souttar; (penalty scored) Irvine; (penalty scored) Mabil; (penalty missed) Herrington	Ryan	3 July	Arlington	AT&T Stadium	
39.	2026, Canada / Mexico / United States	Round of 16	Switzerland	0–0	Colombia	4–3	1–2	5–5	Kobel	Xhaka (penalty scored); Amdouni (penalty scored); Akanji (penalty missed); Itten (penalty scored); R. Vargas (penalty scored)	(penalty scored) Quintero; (penalty missed) D. Sánchez; (penalty scored) Campaz; (penalty missed) Hernández; (penalty scored) L. Díaz	C. Vargas	7 July	Vancouver	BC Place	

== Statistics ==
Key

- † = shoot-out in the World Cup final
- **Bold** = won championship that year

=== Shoot-out records ===
Most shoot-outs in a tournament

- **5** – 2022

Fewest shoot-outs in a tournament (Note: Since the introduction of shoot-outs as tiebreakers in 1978.)

- **0** – 1978

Most played shoot-out

- **2** – France vs Italy (1998, 2006†)
- **2** – Argentina vs Netherlands (2014, 2022)

Most penalties in a shoot-out

- **12** – West Germany vs France, 1982
- **12** – Sweden vs Romania, 1994
- **12** – Paraguay vs Germany, 2026

Fewest penalties in a shoot-out

- **7** – West Germany vs Mexico, 1986
- **7** – Ukraine vs Switzerland, 2006
- **7** – Morocco vs Spain, 2022

Fewest scores in a shoot-out

- **3** – Ukraine vs Switzerland, 2006
- **3** – Morocco vs Spain, 2022

Most misses in a shoot-out

- **5** – Argentina vs Yugoslavia, 1990
- **5** – Spain vs Republic of Ireland, 2002
- **5** – Portugal vs England, 2006
- **5** – Brazil vs Chile, 2014
- **5** – Croatia vs Denmark, 2018
- **5** – Paraguay vs Germany, 2026
- **5** – Morocco vs Netherlands, 2026

Most consecutive misses in a shoot-out

- **4** – Spain vs Republic of Ireland, 2002

Most scored in a shoot-out

- **9** – West Germany vs France, 1982
- **9** – Belgium vs Spain, 1986
- **9** – Republic of Ireland vs Romania, 1990
- **9** – Sweden vs Romania, 1994

Most consecutive scored in a shoot-out

- **8** – Republic of Ireland vs Romania, 1990

=== Team records ===
Most played

- **7** – Argentina (1990 (x2), 1998, 2006, 2014, **2022 (x2)**)

Most played in one tournament

- **2** – Argentina (1990) 2/0, **(2022) 2/0**
- **2** – Croatia (2018) 2/0, (2022) 2/0
- **2** – Spain (2002) 1/1
- **2** – Costa Rica (2014) 1/1
- **2** – Netherlands (2014) 1/1
- **2** – Russia (2018) 1/1

Most won

- **6** – Argentina (1990 (x2), 1998, 2014, **2022 (x2)**)

Most lost

- **4** – Spain (1986, 2002, 2018, 2022)
- **4** – Netherlands (1998, 2014, 2022, 2026)

Most consecutive wins

- **4** – Germany (Note: Includes records by West Germany.) (1982, 1986, **1990**, 2006)
- **4** – Croatia (2018 (x2), 2022 (x2))

Most consecutive losses

- **3** – Italy (1990, 1994†, 1998)
- **3** – England (1990, 1998, 2006)
- **3** – Spain (2002, 2018, 2022)
- **3** – Netherlands (2014, 2022, 2026)

Most won without ever losing

- **4** – Croatia (2018 (x2), 2022 (x2))

Most lost without ever winning

- **2** – Mexico (1986, 1994)
- **2** – Romania (1990, 1994)
- **2** – Japan (2010, 2022)
- **2** – Colombia (2018, 2026)

Most knockout matches played, never playing a shoot-out

- **8** – United States (1994, 2002 (×2), 2010, 2014, 2022, 2026 (×2))

Won shoot-out and eventually won the cup

- West Germany (1990)
- Brazil (1994†)
- France (1998)
- Italy (2006†)
- Argentina (2022† (x2))

Won the cup without having to play any shoot-outs (since 1982)

- Italy (1982)
- Argentina (1986)
- Brazil (2002)
- Spain (2010, 2026)
- Germany (2014)
- France (2018)

=== Taker records ===
Most participations in shoot-outs

- **3** – (Italy) Roberto Baggio (1990, 1994†, 1998)
- **3** – (Croatia) Luka Modrić (2018 (×2), 2022)
- **3** – (Argentina) Lionel Messi (2014, **2022† (×2)**)

Most penalties scored

- **3** – (Croatia) Luka Modrić (2018 (×2), 2022)
- **3** – (Argentina) Lionel Messi (2014, **2022† (×2)**)

Most penalties scored in one tournament

- **2** – (Argentina) José Serrizuela (1990)
- **2** – (Argentina) Jorge Burruchaga (1990)
- **2** – (Spain) Fernando Hierro (2002)
- **2** – (Spain) Rubén Baraja (2002)
- **2** – (Costa Rica) Celso Borges (2014)
- **2** – (Costa Rica) Giancarlo González (2014)
- **2** – (Netherlands) Arjen Robben (2014)
- **2** – (Netherlands) Dirk Kuyt (2014)
- **2** – (Croatia) Luka Modrić (2018)
- **2** – (Russia) Sergei Ignashevich (2018)
- **2** – (Croatia) Ivan Rakitić (2018)
- **2** – (Croatia) Nikola Vlašić (2022)
- **2** – (Argentina) Lionel Messi (**2022†**)
- **2** – (Argentina) Gonzalo Montiel (**2022†**)
- **2** – (Argentina) Leandro Paredes (**2022†**)

Most match-winning penalties scored

- **2** – (Croatia) Ivan Rakitić (2018 (×2))

=== Goalkeeper records ===
Most participations in shoot-outs

- **2** – (West Germany) Harald Schumacher (1982, 1986)
- **2** – (Argentina) Sergio Goycochea (1990 (×2))
- **2** – (Brazil) Cláudio Taffarel (**1994†**, 1998)
- **2** – (Italy) Gianluca Pagliuca (1994†, 1998)
- **2** – (France) Fabien Barthez (**1998**, 2006†)
- **2** – (Spain) Iker Casillas (2002 (×2))
- **2** – (Costa Rica) Keylor Navas (2014 (×2))
- **2** – (Russia) Igor Akinfeev (2018 (×2))
- **2** – (Croatia) Danijel Subašić (2018 (×2))
- **2** – (Croatia) Dominik Livaković (2022 (×2))
- **2** – (Argentina) Emiliano Martínez (**2022† (×2)**)
- **2** – (Morocco) Yassine Bounou (2022, 2026)

Most penalties taken against

- **10** – (Argentina) Sergio Goycochea
- **10** – (France) Fabien Barthez
- **10** – (Spain) Iker Casillas
- **10** – (Russia) Igor Akinfeev
- **10** – (Croatia) Danijel Subašić

Most penalties scored against

- **8** – (France) Fabien Barthez

Most penalties missed against (Note: Includes saves, shots onto the bar, and shots wide.)

- **6** – (Morocco) Yassine Bounou

Most penalties saved

- **4** – (Germany) Harald Schumacher (2 vs France in 1982 and 2 vs Mexico in 1986)
- **4** – (Argentina) Sergio Goycochea (2 vs Yugoslavia in 1990 and 2 vs Italy in 1990)
- **4** – (Croatia) Danijel Subašić (3 vs Denmark in 2018 and 1 vs Russia in 2018)
- **4** – (Croatia) Dominik Livaković (3 vs Japan in 2022 and 1 vs Brazil in 2022)

Most penalties saved in one shoot-out

- **3** – (Portugal) Ricardo (vs England in 2006)
- **3** – (Croatia) Danijel Subašić (vs Denmark in 2018)
- **3** – (Croatia) Dominik Livaković (vs Japan in 2022)

Most match-winning penalties saved

- **2** – (Argentina) Sergio Goycochea (1990 (×2))

=== By team ===
Penalty shoot-out statistics by team
Team	Played	Win	Loss	% Win	Win Year	Loss Year	S	A	S %
Argentina	7	6	1	86%	1990 (x2), 1998, 2014, **2022† (x2)**	2006	25	31	81%
Germany	5	4	1	80%	1982, 1986, **1990**, 2006	2026	20	24	83%
Brazil	5	3	2	60%	**1994†**, 1998, 2014	1986, 2022	15	22	68%
France	5	2	3	40%	1986, **1998**	1982, 2006†, 2022†	17	24	71%
Spain	5	1	4	20%	2002	1986, 2002, 2018, 2022	13	22	59%
Netherlands	5	1	4	20%	2014	1998, 2014, 2022, 2026	13	22	59%
Croatia	4	4	0	100%	2018 (x2), 2022 (x2)	-	14	18	78%
Italy	4	1	3	25%	**2006†**	1990, 1994†, 1998	13	20	65%
England	4	1	3	25%	2018	1990, 1998, 2006	11	19	58%
Paraguay	2	2	0	100%	2010, 2026	-	9	11	82%
Morocco	2	2	0	100%	2022, 2026	-	6	9	67%
Republic of Ireland	2	1	1	50%	1990	2002	7	10	70%
Costa Rica	2	1	1	50%	2014	2014	8	10	80%
Russia	2	1	1	50%	2018	2018	7	9	78%
Switzerland	2	1	1	50%	2026	2006	4	8	50%
Mexico	2	0	2	0%	-	1986, 1994	2	7	29%
Romania	2	0	2	0%	-	1990, 1994	8	11	73%
Japan	2	0	2	0%	-	2010, 2022	4	8	50%
Colombia	2	0	2	0%	-	2018, 2026	6	10	60%
Belgium	1	1	0	100%	1986	-	5	5	100%
Bulgaria	1	1	0	100%	1994	-	3	4	75%
Sweden	1	1	0	100%	1994	-	5	6	83%
South Korea	1	1	0	100%	2002	-	5	5	100%
Portugal	1	1	0	100%	2006	-	3	5	60%
Ukraine	1	1	0	100%	2006	-	3	4	75%
Uruguay	1	1	0	100%	2010	-	4	5	80%
Egypt	1	1	0	100%	2026	-	4	4	100%
Serbia (Note: Includes records by Yugoslavia.)	1	0	1	0%	-	1990	2	5	40%
Ghana	1	0	1	0%	-	2010	2	4	50%
Chile	1	0	1	0%	-	2014	2	5	40%
Greece	1	0	1	0%	-	2014	3	4	75%
Denmark	1	0	1	0%	-	2018	2	5	40%
Australia	1	0	1	0%	-	2026	2	4	50%

=== By tournament ===
Before the introduction of penalty shoot-outs in 1978:

- Of the 35 knock-out matches from 1930 to 1938, 31 were decided within at most 120 minutes, the remaining 4 matches – one in 1934 and three in 1938 – were decided by replays.
- There were no knock-out matches in 1950.
- All 42 knock-out matches from 1954 to 1974 were decided within at most 120 minutes, so no replays or drawing of lots were needed.

Penalty shoot-outs by tournaments
Year	Teams	Knock-out matches	Matches with extra time	Penalty shoot-outs	Percentage of extra time matches	Percentage of matches with penalties	Penalties scored	Penalty attempts	Penalty score rate
1978	16	2	1	0	**50.0%**	0.0%	–	–	–
1982	24	4	1	1	25.0%	25.0%	9	12	75.0%
1986	24	16	5	3	31.3%	18.8%	21	27	**77.8%**
1990	24	16	8	4	**50.0%**	25.0%	**28**	38	73.7%
1994	24	16	4	3	25.0%	18.8%	18	29	62.1%
1998	32	16	4	3	25.0%	18.8%	20	28	71.4%
2002	32	16	5	2	31.3%	12.5%	13	19	68.4%
2006	32	16	6	4	37.5%	25.0%	21	33	63.6%
2010	32	16	4	2	25.0%	12.5%	14	18	**77.8%**
2014	32	16	8	4	**50.0%**	25.0%	26	36	72.2%
2018	32	16	5	4	31.3%	25.0%	26	39	66.7%
2022	32	16	5	**5**	31.3%	**31.3%**	26	**41**	63.4%
2026	48	32	**9**	4	28.1%	12.5%	25	40	62.5%
Total		198	65	39	32.8%	19.7%	247	360	68.6%

Highest values in bold.

== See also ==
- List of Copa América penalty shoot-outs
- List of FIFA Women's World Cup penalty shoot-outs
- List of UEFA European Championship penalty shoot-outs
