= 2026 FIFA World Cup round of 32 =

The round of 32, the first round of the knockout stage of the 2026 FIFA World Cup, took place from June 28 to July 3, 2026. It was the first time that a FIFA World Cup featured a single-elimination round with more than sixteen teams remaining in the tournament.

Sixteen matches were played across fourteen host cities, with the sixteen winning teams advancing to the round of 16.

== Matches ==
=== South Africa vs Canada ===
The teams' only previous meeting took place in a 2007 friendly, which ended in a 2–0 win for South Africa.

After facing co-hosts Mexico in their opening group stage match, South Africa became the first team in tournament history to face two different host nations in a single edition since Turkey in 2002. It also marked the first time a host nation played a World Cup match outside its own borders, after a 2–1 loss to Switzerland in its final group stage match cost Canada a guaranteed home-field advantage.

Following a goalless 90 minutes, two minutes into stoppage time, Canada vice-captain Stephen Eustáquio gained possession after the ball was headed towards him, before striking right-footed from the edge of the penalty area low into the bottom left corner of the net for the only goal of the match.

With this win, Canada advanced to the round of 16 for the first time in their three appearances at the World Cup.

June 28, 2026
12:00 p.m. UTC−7

South Africa	0–1	Canada
	(Note: "South Africa vs Canada | Round of 32 | FIFA World Cup 2026". FIFA. Retrieved June 28, 2026.; "Match Report – Round of 32 – South Africa v. Canada". FIFA. June 28, 2026. Retrieved June 28, 2026.; "Post match summary report – Round of 32 – South Africa v. Canada". FIFA. June 29, 2026. Retrieved June 29, 2026.)	Eustáquio 90+2'

SoFi Stadium, Inglewood
Attendance: 69,237
Referee: João Pinheiro (Portugal)

South Africa	Canada

GK	1	Ronwen Williams (c)
RB	20	Khuliso Mudau
CB	21	Ime Okon
CB	14	Mbekezeli Mbokazi
LB	6	Aubrey Modiba
CM	13	Sphephelo Sithole
CM	4	Teboho Mokoena
RW	12	Thapelo Maseko	(substituted off) 86'
AM	10	Relebohile Mofokeng	(substituted off) 46'
LW	7	Oswin Appollis
CF	17	Evidence Makgopa	(substituted off) 86'
Substitutions:
MF	5	Thalente Mbatha	(substituted on) 46'
FW	15	Iqraam Rayners	(substituted on) 86'
FW	8	Tshepang Moremi	(substituted on) 86'
Manager:
(Belgium) Hugo Broos

GK	16	Maxime Crépeau
RB	2	Alistair Johnston
CB	15	Moïse Bombito		(substituted off) 59'
CB	13	Derek Cornelius
LB	22	Richie Laryea
RM	17	Tajon Buchanan		(substituted off) 75'
CM	25	Nathan Saliba	(yellow card) 54'	(substituted off) 59'
CM	7	Stephen Eustáquio (c)
LM	11	Liam Millar		(substituted off) 70'
CF	10	Jonathan David
CF	12	Tani Oluwaseyi		(substituted off) 70'
Substitutions:
DF	23	Niko Sigur	(yellow card) 67'	(substituted on) 59'
DF	4	Luc de Fougerolles		(substituted on) 59'
FW	24	Promise David		(substituted on) 70'
MF	14	Jacob Shaffelburg		(substituted on) 70'
DF	19	Alphonso Davies		(substituted on) 75'
Manager:
(United States) Jesse Marsch

Man of the Match:
Stephen Eustáquio (Canada)

Assistant referees:
Bruno Jesus (Portugal)
Luciano Maia (Portugal)
Fourth official:
Omar Al Ali (United Arab Emirates)
Reserve assistant referee:
Mohamed Al-Hammadi (United Arab Emirates)
Video assistant referee:
Carlos del Cerro Grande (Spain)
Assistant video assistant referee:
Rodolpho Toski (Brazil)
Support video assistant referee:
Hernán Mastrángelo (Argentina)

=== Brazil vs Japan ===
The teams had previously met 14 times, including once in the World Cup: a 4–1 group stage win for Brazil at the 2006 FIFA World Cup. Their latest encounter took place at the 2025 Kirin Challenge Cup last October, when Japan gained their first win ever against Brazil in a 3–2 comeback.

After 29 minutes, Japan midfielder Kaishu Sano made a solo run from the halfway line, before shooting low from outside the penalty area into the bottom left corner of the net to put Japan into the lead. Japan nearly conceded seven minutes into the second half, with goalkeeper Zion Suzuki just managing to keep it off the line.

Casemiro equalized for Brazil at 56 minutes, with a close-range header at the back post after a cross from Gabriel Magalhães from the left. With just a minute of added time remaining, Bruno Guimarães passed low into Gabriel Martinelli on the left of the penalty area who shot low right footed to the bottom right corner of the net in off the post to win the game for Brazil on a 2–1 scoreline.

The victory advanced Brazil to the Round of 16. Japan were eliminated, marking the third consecutive World Cup that they have lost after leading in the knockout rounds, as well as the first time Japan failed to advance to the Round of 16 since 2014.

June 29, 2026
12:00 p.m. UTC−5

Brazil	2–1	Japan
Casemiro 56'; Martinelli 90+5'	(Note: "Brazil vs Japan | Round of 32 | FIFA World Cup 2026". FIFA. Retrieved June 29, 2026.; "Match Report – Round of 32 – Brazil v. Japan". FIFA. June 29, 2026. Retrieved June 29, 2026.; "Post match summary report – Round of 32 – Brazil v. Japan". FIFA. June 30, 2026. Retrieved June 30, 2026.)	Sano 29'

NRG Stadium, Houston
Attendance: 68,777
Referee: Maurizio Mariani (Italy)

Brazil	Japan

GK	1	Alisson
RB	13	Danilo Luiz	(yellow card) 48'
CB	4	Marquinhos (c)
CB	3	Gabriel Magalhães
LB	16	Douglas Santos
DM	5	Casemiro	(yellow card) 14'	(substituted off) 90+1'
CM	8	Bruno Guimarães		(substituted off) 90+7'
CM	20	Lucas Paquetá		(substituted off) 46'
RF	26	Rayan
CF	9	Matheus Cunha		(substituted off) 66'
LF	7	Vinícius Júnior
Substitutions:
FW	19	Endrick		(substituted on) 46'
FW	22	Gabriel Martinelli		(substituted on) 66'
MF	17	Fabinho		(substituted on) 90+1'
MF	18	Danilo Santos		(substituted on) 90+7'
Manager:
(Italy) Carlo Ancelotti

GK	1	Zion Suzuki
CB	22	Takehiro Tomiyasu
CB	3	Shōgo Taniguchi
CB	21	Hiroki Itō
RM	10	Ritsu Dōan (c)		(substituted off) 66'
CM	24	Kaishū Sano	(yellow card) 12'
CM	15	Daichi Kamada	(yellow card) 45'	(substituted off) 78'
LM	13	Keito Nakamura		(substituted off) 66'
RF	14	Junya Itō		(substituted off) 78'
CF	18	Ayase Ueda
LF	11	Daizen Maeda		(substituted off) 90+7'
Substitutions:
DF	25	Junnosuke Suzuki	(yellow card) 84'	(substituted on) 66'
DF	2	Yukinari Sugawara		(substituted on) 66'
MF	7	Ao Tanaka		(substituted on) 78'
FW	6	Shūto Machino		(substituted on) 78'
FW	19	Kōki Ogawa		(substituted on) 90+7'
Manager:
Hajime Moriyasu

Man of the Match:
Casemiro (Brazil)

Assistant referees:
Daniele Bindoni (Italy)
Alberto Tegoni (Italy)
Fourth official:
Sandro Schärer (Switzerland)
Reserve assistant referee:
Stéphane De Almeida (Switzerland)
Video assistant referee:
Marco Di Bello (Italy)
Assistant video assistant referee:
Ivan Bebek (Croatia)
Support video assistant referee:
Joe Dickerson (United States)

=== Germany vs Paraguay ===
The teams had previously met twice, with their first encounter being Germany's 1–0 round of 16 win at the 2002 FIFA World Cup. This was followed by a 3–3 draw in a friendly match in 2013.

After 42 minutes, Paraguay won a corner on the right. Although goalkeeper Manuel Neuer managed to punch the ball out of the box from the corner, Germany failed to maintain possession. A series of passes sent the ball into the path of Paraguay midfielder Julio Enciso from the right, who headed the ball to the left past Neuer. This opened up the scoring, and was Paraguay's first ever goal in the knockout stages of the FIFA World Cup.

In the 54th minute, German midfielder Florian Wirtz sent a cross into the penalty area from the left which found the head of his teammate Kai Havertz, who glanced it into the right corner of the net for the equalizer.

In the 102nd minute, a corner kick from the right saw defender Jonathan Tah head the ball at the back post into the Paraguayan net. However, the goal was disallowed as VAR review found that goalkeeper Orlando Gill had been fouled in his box, and was unable to challenge for the ball fairly.

In the ensuing penalty shootout, Kai Havertz failed to convert the first penalty for Germany, and the teams were tied at the end of five shots, with the shoot-out going into sudden death. Tah sent the ball high over the bar, allowing centre-back José Canale the chance to send the ball into the top right of the net and ending the shootout 4–3 in Paraguay's favor.

With this victory, Paraguay advanced to the round of 16 for the first time since 2010, eliminating Germany. This marks the third consecutive World Cup where Germany failed to reach the round of 16, the first time they were ever defeated in a penalty shootout at the World Cup, and the first time they were defeated in a penalty shootout in a senior men's tournament since the UEFA Euro 1976 final against Czechoslovakia at the hands of Antonín Panenka's famous spot kick.

The president of Paraguay, Santiago Peña, declared a national holiday for the next day to celebrate the historic win.

June 29, 2026
4:30 p.m. UTC−4

Germany	1–1 (a.e.t.)	Paraguay
Havertz 54'	(Note: "Germany vs Paraguay | Round of 32 | FIFA World Cup 2026". FIFA. Retrieved June 29, 2026.; "Match Report – Round of 32 – Germany v. Paraguay". FIFA. June 29, 2026. Retrieved June 29, 2026.; "Post match summary report – Round of 32 – Germany v. Paraguay". FIFA. June 30, 2026. Retrieved June 30, 2026.)	Enciso 42'
Penalties
Havertz (penalty missed); Kimmich (penalty scored); Musiala (penalty scored); Woltemade (penalty missed); Amiri (penalty scored); Tah (penalty missed)	3–4	(penalty scored) Maurício; (penalty scored) G. Gómez; (penalty scored) Galarza; (penalty missed) Sanabria; (penalty missed) Balbuena; (penalty scored) Canale

Gillette Stadium, Foxborough
Attendance: 63,945
Referee: Jalal Jayed (Morocco)

Germany	Paraguay

GK	1	Manuel Neuer
RB	6	Joshua Kimmich (c)
CB	4	Jonathan Tah
CB	2	Antonio Rüdiger		(substituted off) 110'
LB	18	Nathaniel Brown
CM	23	Felix Nmecha		(substituted off) 46'
CM	5	Aleksandar Pavlović		(substituted off) 79'
RW	19	Leroy Sané		(substituted off) 88'
AM	7	Kai Havertz	(yellow card) 106'
LW	17	Florian Wirtz		(substituted off) 110'
CF	26	Deniz Undav		(substituted off) 63'
Substitutions:
MF	8	Leon Goretzka		(substituted on) 46'
MF	10	Jamal Musiala	(yellow card) 115'	(substituted on) 63'
DF	3	Waldemar Anton		(substituted on) 79'
FW	11	Nick Woltemade		(substituted on) 88'
MF	20	Nadiem Amiri		(substituted on) 110'
DF	24	Malick Thiaw		(substituted on) 110'
Other disciplinary actions:
TS	—	Mads Buttgereit	(yellow card) 116'
Manager:
Julian Nagelsmann			(yellow card) 105+1'

GK	12	Orlando Gill
RB	4	Juan José Cáceres		(substituted off) 99'
CB	15	Gustavo Gómez (c)
CB	13	José Canale
LB	6	Júnior Alonso		(substituted off) 120+2'
RM	10	Miguel Almirón		(substituted off) 91'
CM	16	Damián Bobadilla		(substituted off) 99'
CM	14	Andrés Cubas	(yellow card) 65'
LM	23	Matías Galarza	(yellow card) 117'
CF	21	Gabriel Ávalos		(substituted off) 55'
CF	19	Julio Enciso		(substituted off) 57'
Substitutions:
MF	24	Gustavo Caballero		(substituted on) 55'
MF	11	Maurício		(substituted on) 57'
DF	2	Gustavo Velázquez		(substituted on) 91'
FW	9	Antonio Sanabria		(substituted on) 99'
MF	20	Braian Ojeda		(substituted on) 99'
DF	5	Fabián Balbuena		(substituted on) 120+2'
Other disciplinary actions:
TS	—	Alejandro Juan	(yellow card) 117'
Manager:
(Argentina) Gustavo Alfaro			(yellow card) 105'

Man of the Match:
Orlando Gill (Paraguay)

Assistant referees:
Zakaria Brinsi (Morocco)
Mostafa Akarkad (Morocco)
Fourth official:
Ma Ning (China)
Reserve assistant referee:
Zhou Fei (China)
Video assistant referee:
Tatiana Guzmán (Nicaragua)
Assistant video assistant referee:
Hamza El-Fariq (Morocco)
Support video assistant referee:
Abdullah Al-Shehri (Saudi Arabia)

=== Netherlands vs Morocco ===
The teams had previously faced each other three times, with the Netherlands winning twice: a 2–1 group stage victory at the 1994 FIFA World Cup (their first meeting) and most recently in a 2017 friendly (also by a 2–1 margin).

Following a goalless first half, including two back-to-back saves from Dutch goalkeeper Bart Verbruggen, the Netherlands went in front after 72 minutes. A header from Wout Weghorst sent the ball into the path of his teammate Crysencio Summerville, who began a run into the Moroccan half. Though he was brought down, the Moroccan defence failed to clear the ball and it broke into the path of Cody Gakpo who smashed the ball low into the net from twelve yards out to put the Netherlands into the lead. Gakpo then broke into tears, overwhelmed with emotion after his partner's recent miscarriage.

As the game went into stoppage time, a long ball from Chemsdine Talbi outside the box on the left found the head of centre-back Issa Diop, who headed powerfully to the right of the net from six yards out for the equalizer. After a goalless extra-time, the match went to a penalty shoot-out. Teun Koopmeiners took the first penalty of the shoot-out and scored. Ismael Saibari scored the winning penalty in the shoot-out with a low shot to the left to secure victory for Morocco. The Dutch had missed three penalty kicks, including their last two kicks, with Morocco also missing two penalties.

Morocco advanced to the round of 16, while this defeat marks the Netherlands' third consecutive World Cup elimination via penalty shootout, following similar exits against Argentina in 2014 and 2022 (as they failed to qualify in 2018). This was the Netherlands' worst final position at a FIFA World Cup, with a 17th place finish.

June 29, 2026
7:00 p.m. UTC−6

Netherlands	1–1 (a.e.t.)	Morocco
Gakpo 72'	(Note: "Netherlands vs Morocco | Round of 32 | FIFA World Cup 2026". FIFA. Retrieved June 30, 2026.; "Match Report – Round of 32 – Netherlands v. Morocco". FIFA. June 30, 2026. Retrieved June 30, 2026.; "Post match summary report – Round of 32 – Netherlands v. Morocco". FIFA. June 30, 2026. Retrieved June 30, 2026.)	Diop 90+1'
Penalties
Koopmeiners (penalty scored); Kluivert (penalty missed); Weghorst (penalty scored); Timber (penalty missed); Summerville (penalty missed)	2–3	(penalty missed) El Aynaoui; (penalty scored) Rahimi; (penalty scored) Talbi; (penalty missed) Hakimi; (penalty scored) Saibari

Estadio BBVA, Guadalupe
Attendance: 51,243
Referee: Wilton Sampaio (Brazil)

Netherlands	Morocco

GK	1	Bart Verbruggen
CB	6	Jan Paul van Hecke
CB	4	Virgil van Dijk (c)
CB	5	Nathan Aké	(substituted off) 71'
RM	22	Denzel Dumfries
CM	8	Ryan Gravenberch	(substituted off) 86'
CM	21	Frenkie de Jong	(substituted off) 110'
LM	15	Micky van de Ven	(substituted off) 86'
RF	24	Crysencio Summerville
CF	19	Brian Brobbey	(substituted off) 71'
LF	11	Cody Gakpo	(substituted off) 113'
Substitutions:
MF	20	Teun Koopmeiners	(substituted on) 71'
FW	9	Wout Weghorst	(substituted on) 71'
MF	26	Quinten Timber	(substituted on) 86'
DF	25	Jorrel Hato	(substituted on) 86'
MF	3	Marten de Roon	(substituted on) 110'
MF	7	Justin Kluivert	(substituted on) 113'
Manager:
Ronald Koeman

GK	1	Yassine Bounou
RB	2	Achraf Hakimi (c)
CB	14	Issa Diop	(yellow card) 47'
CB	18	Chadi Riad		(substituted off) 75'
LB	3	Noussair Mazraoui
CM	6	Ayyoub Bouaddi		(substituted off) 79'
CM	24	Neil El Aynaoui
RW	10	Brahim Díaz		(substituted off) 79'
AM	8	Azzedine Ounahi		(substituted off) 86'
LW	23	Bilal El Khannouss		(substituted off) 86'
CF	11	Ismael Saibari
Substitutions:
DF	26	Anass Salah-Eddine		(substituted on) 75'
MF	15	Samir El Mourabet		(substituted on) 79'
MF	16	Gessime Yassine		(substituted on) 79'
FW	9	Soufiane Rahimi		(substituted on) 86'
MF	7	Chemsdine Talbi		(substituted on) 86'
Manager:
Mohamed Ouahbi

Man of the Match:
Issa Diop (Morocco)

Assistant referees:
Bruno Pires (Brazil)
Bruno Boschilia (Brazil)
Fourth official:
Cristián Garay (Chile)
Reserve assistant referee:
José Retamal (Chile)
Video assistant referee:
Nicolás Gallo (Colombia)
Assistant video assistant referee:
Leodán González (Uruguay)
Support video assistant referee:
Armando Villarreal (United States)

=== Ivory Coast vs Norway ===
The two teams had never met before.

In the 39th minute, Antonio Nusa opened up the scoring when he collected the ball on the left side of the penalty area before cutting in and finished with a curling right-footed strike into the far top corner of the net to put Norway in front.

Ivory Coast trailed until the 74th minute. Winger Amad Diallo picked up the ball in the Norwegian half and began a run from the right side of the penalty area, cutting in from the right and getting past two defenders before slotting it into the left of the net from six yards out for the equalizer. In the 86th minute Patrick Berg got in on the right side of the penalty area and crossed low for Erling Haaland to side foot the ball home from six yards for the winning goal. This marked Haaland's fifth goal in three games, putting him in contention for the tournament's Golden Boot at just one goal behind Lionel Messi.

With their first victory in the FIFA World Cup knockout stages, Norway advanced to the round of 16 while Ivory Coast were eliminated, marking their best-ever finish in the FIFA World Cup since 2014.

June 30, 2026
12:00 p.m. UTC−5

Ivory Coast	1–2	Norway
Diallo 74'	(Note: "Côte d'Ivoire vs Norway | Round of 32 | FIFA World Cup 2026". FIFA. Retrieved June 30, 2026.; "Match Report – Round of 32 – Côte d'Ivoire v. Norway". FIFA. June 30, 2026. Retrieved June 30, 2026.; "Post match summary report – Round of 32 – Côte d'Ivoire vs. Norway". FIFA. July 1, 2026. Retrieved July 1, 2026.)	Nusa 39'; Haaland 86'

AT&T Stadium, Arlington
Attendance: 69,665
Referee: Jesús Valenzuela (Venezuela)

Ivory Coast	Norway

GK	1	Yahia Fofana
RB	17	Guéla Doué
CB	7	Odilon Kossounou
CB	20	Emmanuel Agbadou
LB	3	Ghislain Konan	(substituted off) 90+3'
DM	18	Ibrahim Sangaré
CM	8	Franck Kessié (c)
CM	26	Christ Inao Oulaï	(substituted off) 60'
RF	19	Nicolas Pépé	(substituted off) 87'
CF	9	Ange-Yoan Bonny	(substituted off) 60'
LF	11	Yan Diomande	(substituted off) 90+3'
Substitutions:
FW	15	Amad Diallo	(substituted on) 60'
FW	12	Elye Wahi	(substituted on) 60'
FW	14	Oumar Diakité	(substituted on) 87'
FW	22	Evann Guessand	(substituted on) 90+3'
FW	24	Bazoumana Touré	(substituted on) 90+3'
Manager:
Emerse Faé

GK	1	Ørjan Nyland
RB	16	Marcus Holmgren Pedersen		(substituted off) 83'
CB	3	Kristoffer Ajer
CB	17	Torbjørn Heggem
LB	5	David Møller Wolfe
CM	6	Patrick Berg
CM	8	Sander Berge
AM	10	Martin Ødegaard (c)
RF	7	Alexander Sørloth		(substituted off) 71'
CF	9	Erling Haaland
LF	20	Antonio Nusa	(yellow card) 45+1'	(substituted off) 71'
Substitutions:
MF	21	Andreas Schjelderup		(substituted on) 71'
MF	22	Oscar Bobb		(substituted on) 71'
MF	14	Fredrik Aursnes		(substituted on) 83'
Manager:
Ståle Solbakken

Man of the Match:
Antonio Nusa (Norway)

Assistant referees:
Jorge Urrego (Venezuela)
Tulio Moreno (Venezuela)
Fourth official:
Juan Gabriel Benítez (Paraguay)
Reserve assistant referee:
Eduardo Cardozo (Paraguay)
Video assistant referee:
Juan Lara (Chile)
Assistant video assistant referee:
Juan Soto (Venezuela)
Support video assistant referee:
Jarred Gillett (England)

=== France vs Sweden ===
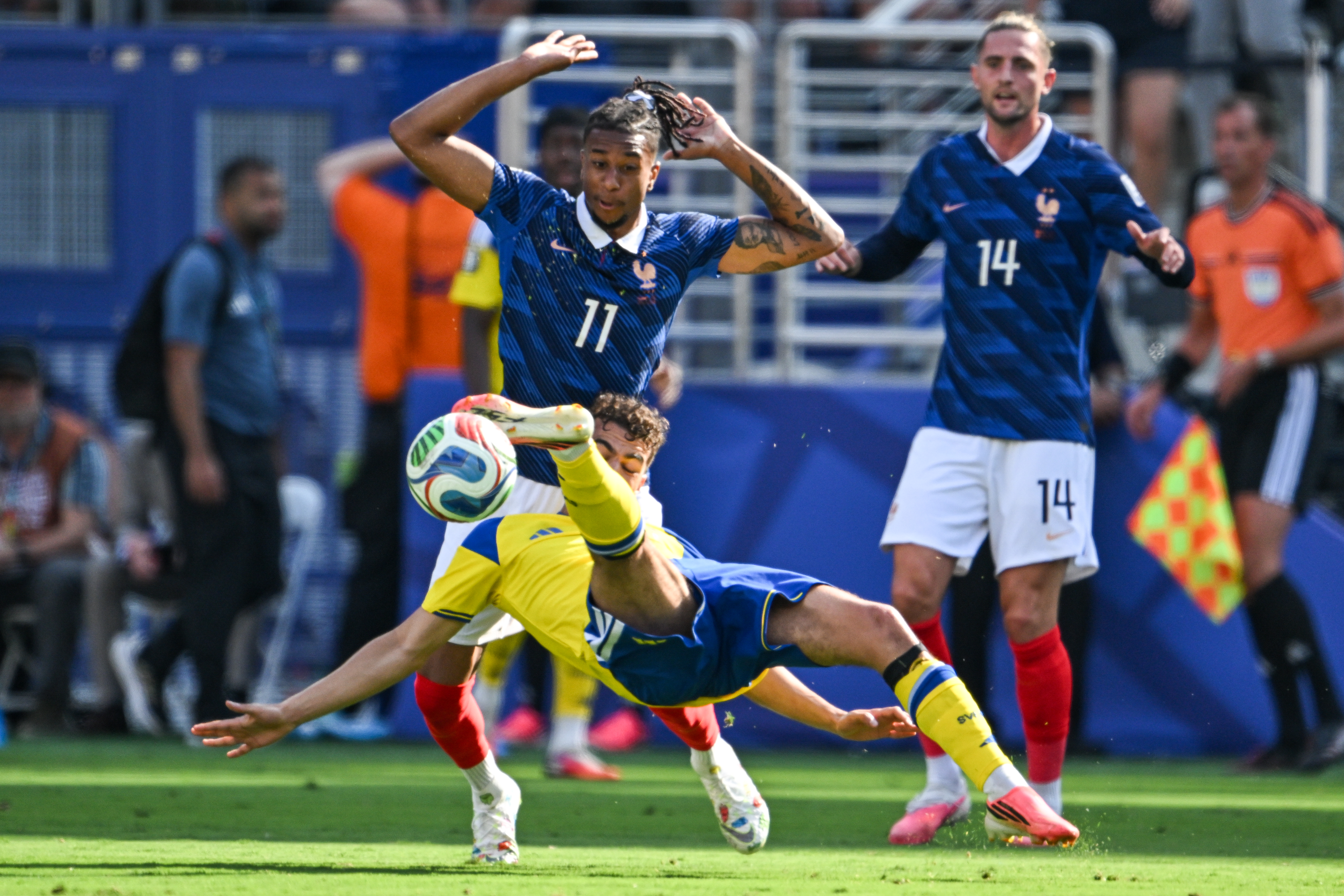
During the match between France and Sweden.

The teams had previously faced each other 23 times, most recently in 2020, a 4–2 group stage win for France in the 2020–21 UEFA Nations League A, which marked their 12th win overall. This was their first meeting in a major tournament since the UEFA Euro 2012 group stage, which ended in a 2–0 victory for Sweden.

In the 20th minute, Kylian Mbappé scored with a low shot to the net, but the goal was ruled out for offside. Michael Olise also saw his overhead scissor kick strike the foot of the post with Ousmane Dembélé firing the rebound over the bar. France went in front in the 45th minute when Mbappé received the ball on the left before cutting in and wrong-footing Viktor Gyökeres with a stepover, before shooting into the far right corner of the net from the edge of the six-yard box. Bradley Barcola got a second goal for France in the 53rd minute when he ran onto a pass from Michael Olise on the left of the penalty area before slotting high into the left of the net. Mbappé got his second and France's third when he received a pass on the left of the penalty area from Olise before curling into the right of the net from six yards out.

With two goals, Mbappé became the all-time leading goalscorer in World Cup knockout matches with 10 goals. Additionally, France became the first team to score three or more goals in five straight World Cup matches.

June 30, 2026
5:00 p.m. UTC−4

France	3–0	Sweden
Mbappé 45', 74'; Barcola 53'	(Note: "France vs Sweden | Round of 32 | FIFA World Cup 2026". FIFA. Retrieved June 30, 2026.; "Match Report – Round of 32 – France v. Sweden". FIFA. June 30, 2026. Retrieved June 30, 2026.; "Post match summary report – Round of 32 – France vs. Sweden". FIFA. July 1, 2026. Retrieved July 1, 2026.)

MetLife Stadium, East Rutherford
Attendance: 80,663
Referee: Danny Makkelie (Netherlands)

France	Sweden

GK	16	Mike Maignan
RB	5	Jules Koundé	(substituted off) 75'
CB	4	Dayot Upamecano
CB	17	William Saliba
LB	3	Lucas Digne	(substituted off) 78'
CM	8	Aurélien Tchouaméni
CM	14	Adrien Rabiot
RW	7	Ousmane Dembélé	(substituted off) 75'
AM	11	Michael Olise	(substituted off) 85'
LW	12	Bradley Barcola
CF	10	Kylian Mbappé (c)	(substituted off) 85'
Substitutions:
FW	20	Désiré Doué	(substituted on) 75'
DF	2	Malo Gusto	(substituted on) 75'
DF	19	Théo Hernandez	(substituted on) 78'
FW	22	Jean-Philippe Mateta	(substituted on) 85'
MF	24	Rayan Cherki	(substituted on) 85'
Manager:
Didier Deschamps

GK	1	Jacob Widell Zetterström
RB	8	Daniel Svensson	(substituted off) 82'
CB	2	Gustaf Lagerbielke
CB	3	Victor Lindelöf (c)
LB	5	Gabriel Gudmundsson
RM	11	Anthony Elanga
CM	7	Lucas Bergvall	(substituted off) 66'
CM	18	Yasin Ayari	(substituted off) 82'
LM	24	Elliot Stroud	(substituted off) 66'
CF	17	Viktor Gyökeres
CF	9	Alexander Isak	(substituted off) 89'
Substitutions:
FW	26	Taha Ali	(substituted on) 66'
MF	22	Besfort Zeneli	(substituted on) 66'
MF	10	Benjamin Nygren	(substituted on) 82'
MF	19	Mattias Svanberg	(substituted on) 82'
FW	25	Gustaf Nilsson	(substituted on) 89'
Manager:
(England) Graham Potter

Man of the Match:
Kylian Mbappé (France)

Assistant referees:
Hessel Steegstra (Netherlands)
Jan de Vries (Netherlands)
Fourth official:
Tori Penso (United States)
Reserve assistant referee:
Brooke Mayo (United States)
Video assistant referee:
Dennis Higler (Netherlands)
Assistant video assistant referee:
Bram Van Driessche (Belgium)
Support video assistant referee:
Tomasz Kwiatkowski (Poland)

=== Mexico vs Ecuador ===
The teams had faced each other in 28 previous matches, including a 2–1 group stage victory for Mexico in the 2002 FIFA World Cup. Their latest meeting was a 1–1 draw in a friendly match in 2025. Additionally, the last time both teams encountered each other on the pitch of the Azteca was a friendly that ended in a 3–1 victory for Mexico in 1997.

The match was delayed by an hour due to adverse weather conditions (thunderstorms). Mexico went in front in the 22nd minute, Julián Quiñones received a ball over the top from Roberto Alvarado on the left before running in at goal and cutting in onto his right foot before firing high to the left of the net from twelve yards out. It was 2–0 in the 31st minute, Raúl Jiménez scored with a finish high into the top right corner of the net after a pass from Quiñones from just inside the penalty area. In stoppage time, Piero Hincapié was shown a red card for covering his mouth while speaking to Santiago Giménez, becoming the second player in the tournament to be dismissed for the offense after Paraguay's Miguel Almirón.

This was the first win in a knockout game for Mexico since the win against Bulgaria in 1986, and they advanced to the round of 16.

June 30, 2026
8:00 p.m. UTC−6 (Note: The Mexico v Ecuador match, originally scheduled for 7:00 p.m. UTC−6, was delayed by an hour due to adverse weather conditions.)

Mexico	2–0	Ecuador
Quiñones 22'; Jiménez 31'	(Note: "Mexico vs Ecuador | Round of 32 | FIFA World Cup 2026". FIFA. Retrieved July 1, 2026.; "Match Report – Round of 32 – Mexico v. Ecuador". FIFA. July 1, 2026. Retrieved July 1, 2026.; "Post match summary report – Round of 32 – Mexico v. Ecuador". FIFA. July 1, 2026. Retrieved July 1, 2026.)

Estadio Azteca, Mexico City
Attendance: 80,824
Referee: Slavko Vinčić (Slovenia)

Mexico	Ecuador

GK	1	Raúl Rangel
RB	2	Jorge Sánchez
CB	3	César Montes (c)
CB	5	Johan Vásquez
LB	23	Jesús Gallardo
DM	6	Érik Lira
CM	19	Gilberto Mora	(substituted off) 59'
CM	7	Luis Romo	(substituted off) 73'
RF	25	Roberto Alvarado	(substituted off) 80'
CF	9	Raúl Jiménez	(substituted off) 73'
LF	16	Julián Quiñones	(substituted off) 80'
Substitutions:
MF	26	Brian Gutiérrez	(substituted on) 59'
MF	18	Obed Vargas	(substituted on) 73'
FW	11	Santiago Giménez	(substituted on) 73'
DF	15	Israel Reyes	(substituted on) 80'
MF	17	Orbelín Pineda	(substituted on) 80'
Manager:
Javier Aguirre

GK	1	Hernán Galíndez
RB	21	Alan Franco	(yellow card) 45+1'	(substituted off) 46'
CB	4	Joel Ordóñez		(substituted off) 46'
CB	6	Willian Pacho
LB	3	Piero Hincapié	(red card) 90+5'
RM	9	John Yeboah		(substituted off) 79'
CM	23	Moisés Caicedo (c)	(yellow card) 90+9'
CM	15	Pedro Vite
LM	20	Nilson Angulo		(substituted off) 79'
CF	19	Gonzalo Plata
CF	13	Enner Valencia		(substituted off) 59'
Substitutions:
MF	26	Yaimar Medina		(substituted on) 46'
DF	17	Ángelo Preciado		(substituted on) 46'
FW	11	Kevin Rodríguez		(substituted on) 59'
MF	10	Kendry Páez	(yellow card) 90+3'	(substituted on) 79'
FW	16	Jordy Caicedo		(substituted on) 79'
Manager:
(Argentina) Sebastián Beccacece

Man of the Match:
Julián Quiñones (Mexico)

Assistant referees:
Tomaž Klančnik (Slovenia)
Andraž Kovačič (Slovenia)
Fourth official:
Mustapha Ghorbal (Algeria)
Reserve assistant referee:
Mokrane Gourari (Algeria)
Video assistant referee:
Bastian Dankert (Germany)
Assistant video assistant referee:
Willy Delajod (France)
Support video assistant referee:
Mahmoud Ashour (Egypt)

=== England vs DR Congo ===
The two teams had never met before.

In the 7th minute, Brian Cipenga found himself in space on the left of the penalty area and gave DR Congo the lead when he scored with a low right foot finish to the left corner of the net. DR Congo goalkeeper Lionel Mpasi made four saves in the first half and Marcus Rashford had a shot cleared off the line. England appealed for a penalty which was not awarded when Harry Kane went down in the penalty over the diving Mpasi. Yoane Wissa had a chance to make it 2–0 on the stroke of half-time but hit the post from close range after a cross from the right.

In the 75th minute, Harry Kane made it 1–1 when he headed to the left corner of the net from seven yards out after a chipped cross from substitute Anthony Gordon on the left; Mpasi got a hand to it but couldn't keep it out. In the 86th minute, Kane put England into the lead when he received the ball from Gordon outside the penalty area before taking a touch and shooting powerfully right-foot high to the right of the net from the right.

With this win, England advanced to the round of 16. Although DR Congo were eliminated, this marked their best-ever finish in the FIFA World Cup upon their return after 52 years.

July 1, 2026
12:00 p.m. UTC−4

England	2–1	DR Congo
Kane 75', 86'	(Note: "England vs Congo DR | Round of 32 | FIFA World Cup 2026". FIFA. Retrieved July 1, 2026.; "Match Report – Round of 32 – England v. Congo DR". FIFA. July 1, 2026. Retrieved July 1, 2026.; "Post match summary report – Round of 32 – England v. Congo DR". FIFA. July 1, 2026. Retrieved July 3, 2026.)	Cipenga 7'

Mercedes-Benz Stadium, Atlanta
Attendance: 68,239
Referee: Adham Makhadmeh (Jordan)

England	DR Congo

GK	1	Jordan Pickford
RB	25	Djed Spence		(substituted off) 70'
CB	2	Ezri Konsa
CB	6	Marc Guéhi
LB	3	Nico O'Reilly
CM	8	Elliot Anderson
CM	4	Declan Rice		(substituted off) 90+1'
RW	20	Noni Madueke		(substituted off) 60'
AM	10	Jude Bellingham	(yellow card) 19'
LW	11	Marcus Rashford		(substituted off) 60'
CF	9	Harry Kane (c)
Substitutions:
FW	7	Bukayo Saka		(substituted on) 60'
FW	18	Anthony Gordon		(substituted on) 60'
MF	21	Eberechi Eze		(substituted on) 70'
DF	5	John Stones		(substituted on) 90+1'
Manager:
(Germany) Thomas Tuchel

GK	1	Lionel Mpasi
RB	2	Aaron Wan-Bissaka
CB	22	Chancel Mbemba (c)
CB	4	Axel Tuanzebe
LB	26	Arthur Masuaku		(substituted off) 89'
DM	8	Samuel Moutoussamy		(substituted off) 89'
RM	7	Nathanaël Mbuku		(substituted off) 64'
CM	6	Ngal'ayel Mukau		(substituted off) 76'
CM	14	Noah Sadiki	(yellow card) 27'
LM	9	Brian Cipenga		(substituted off) 76'
CF	20	Yoane Wissa
Substitutions:
FW	13	Meschak Elia		(substituted on) 64'
MF	10	Théo Bongonda		(substituted on) 76'
MF	25	Edo Kayembe		(substituted on) 76'
DF	12	Joris Kayembe		(substituted on) 89'
FW	19	Fiston Mayele		(substituted on) 89'
Manager:
(France) Sébastien Desabre

Man of the Match:
Harry Kane (England)

Assistant referees:
Mohammad Al-Kalaf (Jordan)
Ahmad Al-Roalle (Jordan)
Fourth official:
Khalid Al-Turais (Saudi Arabia)
Reserve assistant referee:
Mohammed Al-Bakry (Saudi Arabia)
Video assistant referee:
Khamis Al-Marri (Qatar)
Assistant video assistant referee:
Mohammed Obaid Khadim (United Arab Emirates)
Support video assistant referee:
Joe Dickerson (United States)

=== Belgium vs Senegal ===
The two teams had never met before.

Senegal went in front in the 25th minute, Habib Diarra finished to the net from close range in the 25th minute after a header from Ismaïla Sarr had come back off the right post. In the 51st minute, Ismaïla Sarr made it 2–0, receiving a long pass over the top from Moussa Niakhaté before controlling the ball on his chest and firing to the right of the net from twelve yards out.

Belgium mounted a dramatic late comeback when substitute Romelu Lukaku finished high to the right of the net from close range in the 86th minute after a low cross from Thomas Meunier from the right. In the 89th minute, Youri Tielemans got his head to a cross from the left from Leandro Trossard before Senegal goalkeeper Mory Diaw could reach it to force extra time.

With the score still level in the closing seconds of extra time, referee Saíd Martínez awarded Belgium a penalty following a VAR review after determining that Lamine Camara had slid in and fouled Tielemans inside the penalty area. Tielemans converted the spot kick high to the right of the net in the 125th minute to complete Belgium's 3–2 comeback victory and send the Red Devils into the Round of 16, while Senegal were eliminated despite leading for much of the match.

Tielemans' winning penalty, timed at 124 minutes and 44 seconds, was reported as the latest goal scored in FIFA World Cup history, surpassing Abdelmoumene Djabou's goal against Germany in 2014, timed at 120 minutes and 51 seconds. Belgium also became only the second team in the last 11 World Cup tournaments to overturn a two-goal deficit and advance from a knockout-stage match, following its own 3–2 comeback victory over Japan in 2018.

July 1, 2026
1:00 p.m. UTC−7

Belgium	3–2 (a.e.t.)	Senegal
Lukaku 86'; Tielemans 89', 120+5' (pen.)	(Note: "Belgium vs Senegal | Round of 32 | FIFA World Cup 2026". FIFA. Retrieved June 28, 2026.; "Match Report – Round of 32 – Belgium v. Senegal". FIFA. July 1, 2026. Retrieved July 1, 2026.; "Post match summary report – Round of 32 – Belgium v. Senegal". FIFA. July 1, 2026. Retrieved July 3, 2026.)	Diarra 25'; I. Sarr 51'

Lumen Field, Seattle
Attendance: 66,925
Referee: Saíd Martínez (Honduras)

Belgium	Senegal

GK	1	Thibaut Courtois
RB	21	Timothy Castagne
CB	4	Brandon Mechele	(yellow card) 64'
CB	3	Arthur Theate
LB	5	Maxim De Cuyper		(substituted off) 78'
CM	20	Hans Vanaken		(substituted off) 63'
CM	8	Youri Tielemans (c)
RW	10	Leandro Trossard		(substituted off) 109'
AM	7	Kevin De Bruyne		(substituted off) 56'
LW	11	Jérémy Doku		(substituted off) 56'
CF	17	Charles De Ketelaere		(substituted off) 46'
Substitutions:
FW	9	Romelu Lukaku		(substituted on) 46'
FW	14	Dodi Lukébakio		(substituted on) 56'
MF	23	Nicolas Raskin		(substituted on) 56'
MF	19	Diego Moreira		(substituted on) 63'
DF	15	Thomas Meunier		(substituted on) 78'
MF	24	Amadou Onana		(substituted on) 109'
Manager:
(France) Rudi Garcia			(yellow card) 90'

GK	23	Mory Diaw
RB	15	Krépin Diatta
CB	6	Pathé Ciss
CB	19	Moussa Niakhaté
LB	14	Ismail Jakobs		(substituted off) 93'
CM	21	Habib Diarra		(substituted off) 73'
CM	5	Idrissa Gueye (c)		(substituted off) 95'
CM	26	Pape Gueye		(substituted off) 66'
RF	13	Iliman Ndiaye		(substituted off) 73'
CF	18	Ismaïla Sarr
LF	10	Sadio Mané		(substituted off) 93'
Substitutions:
MF	8	Lamine Camara	(yellow card) 67'	(substituted on) 66'
MF	17	Pape Matar Sarr		(substituted on) 73'
FW	20	Ibrahim Mbaye		(substituted on) 73'
FW	11	Nicolas Jackson		(substituted on) 93'
DF	25	El Hadji Malick Diouf		(substituted on) 93'
MF	22	Bara Sapoko Ndiaye		(substituted on) 95'
Manager:
Pape Thiaw

Man of the Match:
Youri Tielemans (Belgium)

Assistant referees:
Walter López (Honduras)
Christian Ramírez (Honduras)
Fourth official:
Andrés Rojas (Colombia)
Reserve assistant referee:
Alexander Guzmán (Colombia)
Video assistant referee:
Guillermo Pacheco (Mexico)
Assistant video assistant referee:
Rodolpho Toski (Brazil)
Support video assistant referee:
Carlos del Cerro Grande (Spain)

=== United States vs Bosnia and Herzegovina ===
The United States had never lost to Bosnia and Herzegovina in three previous encounters, winning twice, most recently 1–0 in a friendly in 2021.

In the 45th minute, the US took the lead when Folarin Balogun scored with a low left foot finish under Bosnian goalkeeper Nikola Vasilj from inside the penalty area after the ball had deflected to him from Malik Tillman.

In the 64th minute, referee Raphael Claus issued a controversial red card following a VAR review to Balogun, which many including Tarik Muharemović (the player he had been involved in the initial incident with) considered excessive or illegitimate. Several experts compared the incident to that of Lionel Messi in the group stage game between Argentina vs Algeria, where he did not get a red card for the same offense on Aïssa Mandi, with some speculating that his status played a role in the decision. The automatic 1 game suspension for receiving a red card was overturned by FIFA following a call from United States President Donald Trump to FIFA President Gianni Infantino, prompting accusations of political manipulation from UEFA and others in the football world, including former FIFA President Sepp Blatter. As a result, Balogun would play in the United States vs Belgium match on 6 July 2026 in Seattle.

Bosnia were unable to convert their numerical advantage, before Malik Tillman made it 2–0 in the 82nd minute when he scored from a free-kick, kicked right footed from the left of the penalty area that went into the left of the net after goalkeeper Nikola Vasilj was unable to keep it out, ensuring American victory.

The win was the first victory for the US in a FIFA World Cup knockout stage game since 2002, when they defeated Mexico 2–0 in the round of 16. This is additionally their first win against a UEFA team since 2021, also beating Bosnia 1-0 in a friendly. Alongside Canada and Mexico, who won their knockout stage games against South Africa and Ecuador respectively, the United States joined its fellow tournament co-hosts in becoming the first host nations to progress to the round of 16 since Russia in 2018. The match was watched by an average of 26.4 million viewers on Fox Sports in the United States and peaked at 34.82 million viewers—at the time, both records for an English-language soccer broadcast in the United States.

July 1, 2026
5:00 p.m. UTC−7

United States	2–0	Bosnia and Herzegovina
Balogun 45'; Tillman 82'	(Note: "USA vs Bosnia and Herzegovina | Round of 32 | FIFA World Cup 2026". FIFA. Retrieved July 2, 2026.; "Match Report – Round of 32 – USA v. Bosnia and Herzegovina". FIFA. July 2, 2026. Retrieved July 2, 2026.; "Post match summary report – Round of 32 – USA v. Bosnia and Herzegovina". FIFA. July 1, 2026. Retrieved July 3, 2026.)

Levi's Stadium, Santa Clara
Attendance: 68,827
Referee: Raphael Claus (Brazil)

United States	Bosnia and Herzegovina

GK	24	Matt Freese
CB	16	Alex Freeman
CB	3	Chris Richards
CB	13	Tim Ream (c)
RM	2	Sergiño Dest		(substituted off) 87'
CM	8	Weston McKennie		(substituted off) 90+5'
CM	4	Tyler Adams
CM	17	Malik Tillman
LM	5	Antonee Robinson
CF	10	Christian Pulisic		(substituted off) 87'
CF	20	Folarin Balogun	(red card) 64'
Substitutions:
MF	14	Sebastian Berhalter		(substituted on) 87'
FW	9	Ricardo Pepi		(substituted on) 87'
MF	7	Giovanni Reyna		(substituted on) 90+5'
Manager:
(Argentina) Mauricio Pochettino

GK	1	Nikola Vasilj
RB	7	Amar Dedić
CB	18	Nikola Katić		(substituted off) 75'
CB	4	Tarik Muharemović
LB	21	Stjepan Radeljić	(yellow card) 80'
RM	8	Armin Gigović		(substituted off) 51'
CM	14	Ivan Šunjić		(substituted off) 51'
CM	19	Kerim Alajbegović
LM	5	Sead Kolašinac		(substituted off) 75'
CF	10	Ermedin Demirović
CF	11	Edin Džeko (c)		(substituted off) 51'
Substitutions:
MF	26	Ermin Mahmić		(substituted on) 51'
MF	6	Benjamin Tahirović		(substituted on) 51'
MF	20	Esmir Bajraktarević		(substituted on) 51'
FW	23	Haris Tabaković		(substituted on) 75'
MF	15	Amar Memić		(substituted on) 75'
Manager:
Sergej Barbarez			(yellow card) 80'

Man of the Match:
Malik Tillman (United States)

Assistant referees:
Danilo Manis (Brazil)
Rodrigo Figueiredo (Brazil)
Fourth official:
Darío Herrera (Argentina)
Reserve assistant referee:
Cristian Navarro (Argentina)
Video assistant referee:
Juan Soto (Venezuela)
Assistant video assistant referee:
Nicolás Gallo (Colombia)
Support video assistant referee:
Jérôme Brisard (France)

=== Spain vs Austria ===
The two teams had met 16 times before this match, including a 2–1 group stage win for Austria in the 1978 FIFA World Cup. Their most recent encounter was a friendly in 2009 that ended 5–1 to Spain.

Marc Cucurella had a goal disallowed in the first half after Pau Cubarsi was judged to have fouled Austrian keeper Alexander Schlager after a corner from the right. In the 36th minute, Mikel Oyarzabal scored when he side-footed low to the right corner of the net after a low cross from Cucurella from the left. In the 66th minute Pedro Porro scored to make it 2–0 when he ran onto a cross from the left by Álex Baena to head into the net from six yards out. Oyarzabal got his second goal and a third for Spain in the 89th minute when he ran onto a pass from Cucurella to shoot low to the right corner of the net from twelve yards out.

This was the first win for Spain in a World Cup knockout match since the 2010 World Cup final.

July 2, 2026
12:00 p.m. UTC−7

Spain	3–0	Austria
Oyarzabal 36', 89'; Porro 66'	(Note: "Spain vs Austria | Round of 32 | FIFA World Cup 2026". FIFA. Retrieved July 2, 2026.; "Match Report – Round of 32 – Spain v. Austria". FIFA. July 2, 2026. Retrieved July 2, 2026.; "Post match summary report – Round of 32 – Spain v. Austria". FIFA. July 2, 2026. Retrieved July 3, 2026.)

SoFi Stadium, Inglewood
Attendance: 70,492
Referee: Glenn Nyberg (Sweden)

Spain	Austria

GK	23	Unai Simón
RB	12	Pedro Porro
CB	22	Pau Cubarsí
CB	14	Aymeric Laporte	(substituted off) 90+3'
LB	24	Marc Cucurella
DM	16	Rodri (c)
CM	10	Dani Olmo	(substituted off) 71'
CM	20	Pedri	(substituted off) 90+3'
RF	19	Lamine Yamal	(substituted off) 85'
CF	21	Mikel Oyarzabal
LF	15	Álex Baena	(substituted off) 71'
Substitutions:
FW	7	Ferran Torres	(substituted on) 71'
MF	6	Mikel Merino	(substituted on) 71'
MF	9	Gavi	(substituted on) 85'
MF	8	Fabián Ruiz	(substituted on) 90+3'
DF	2	Marc Pubill	(substituted on) 90+3'
Manager:
Luis de la Fuente

GK	1	Alexander Schlager
RB	5	Stefan Posch	(yellow card) 83'	(substituted off) 85'
CB	3	Kevin Danso
CB	8	David Alaba (c)
LB	20	Konrad Laimer
CM	6	Nicolas Seiwald		(substituted off) 46'
CM	4	Xaver Schlager		(substituted off) 46'
RW	18	Romano Schmid		(substituted off) 60'
AM	24	Paul Wanner
LW	9	Marcel Sabitzer
CF	11	Michael Gregoritsch		(substituted off) 60'
Substitutions:
MF	10	Florian Grillitsch		(substituted on) 46'
MF	17	Carney Chukwuemeka		(substituted on) 46'
FW	7	Marko Arnautović		(substituted on) 60'
FW	14	Saša Kalajdžić		(substituted on) 60'
DF	22	Alexander Prass		(substituted on) 85'
Manager:
(Germany) Ralf Rangnick

Man of the Match:
Lamine Yamal (Spain)

Assistant referees:
Mahbod Beigi (Sweden)
Andreas Söderkvist (Sweden)
Fourth official:
Dahane Beida (Mauritania)
Reserve assistant referee:
Elvis Noupue (Cameroon)
Video assistant referee:
Tomasz Kwiatkowski (Poland)
Assistant video assistant referee:
Fedayi San (Switzerland)
Support video assistant referee:
Shaun Evans (Australia)

=== Portugal vs Croatia ===
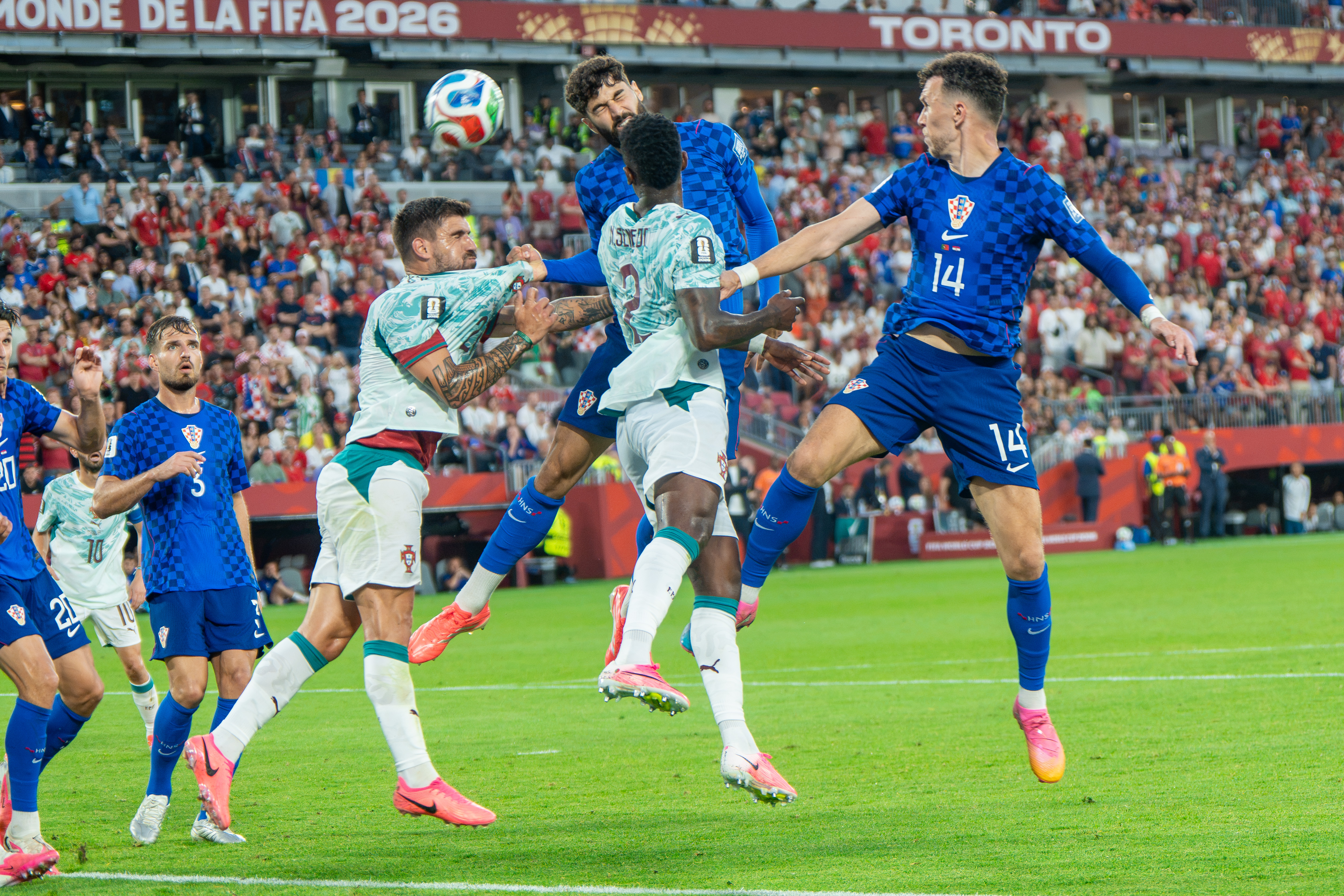
During the match between Portugal and Croatia.

The two teams had met 10 times before, with Portugal winning seven matches. Their most recent meeting was a 1–1 group stage draw in the 2024–25 UEFA Nations League A, while their previous encounter in a major tournament was in the UEFA Euro 2016 round of 16, where Portugal won 1–0 after extra time.

Croatia went in front in the 53rd minute, when Ivan Perišić scored with a low shot from the left of the six yard box, under the goalkeeper to right corner of the net. In the 68th minute, Portugal were awarded a penalty after a VAR review when Nikola Vlašić fouled Renato Veiga after a corner. Cristiano Ronaldo scored the penalty with a shot down the middle to make it 1–1, becoming the oldest goalscorer in a World Cup knockout match.

In the 94th minute, Gonçalo Ramos headed to the right corner of the net after a cross from Rafael Leão from the left to put Portugal into a 2–1 lead. In the 13th minute of stoppage time, Joško Gvardiol slid in to finish towards the net but the goal was eventually ruled out. Igor Matanović had got a slight touch on the ball with his head after a cross, as indicated by Snickometer technology; the ball then dropped to Mario Pašalić, who was in an offside position before the goal was scored despite the ball having come off a Portuguese defender beforehand. For Croatia, this marked the first time they failed to advance further in the knockout stages after their successful finishes in 2018, finishing as the runners-up, and finishing third in 2022.

July 2, 2026
7:00 p.m. UTC−4

Portugal	2–1	Croatia
Ronaldo 68' (pen.); Ramos 90+4'	(Note: "Portugal vs Croatia | Round of 32 | FIFA World Cup 2026". FIFA. Retrieved July 3, 2026.; "Match Report – Round of 32 – Portugal v. Croatia". FIFA. July 3, 2026. Retrieved July 3, 2026.; "Post match summary report – Round of 32 – Portugal v. Croatia". FIFA. July 2, 2026. Retrieved July 3, 2026.)	Perišić 53'

BMO Field, Toronto
Attendance: 43,036
Referee: Espen Eskås (Norway)

Portugal	Croatia

GK	1	Diogo Costa
RB	20	João Cancelo		(substituted off) 62'
CB	3	Rúben Dias	(yellow card) 17'
CB	13	Renato Veiga
LB	25	Nuno Mendes
CM	15	João Neves
CM	23	Vitinha		(substituted off) 62'
RW	18	Pedro Neto		(substituted off) 62'
AM	8	Bruno Fernandes		(substituted off) 62'
LW	17	Rafael Leão
CF	7	Cristiano Ronaldo (c)		(substituted off) 81'
Substitutions:
MF	10	Bernardo Silva		(substituted on) 62'
DF	2	Nélson Semedo		(substituted on) 62'
FW	26	Francisco Conceição		(substituted on) 62'
FW	9	Gonçalo Ramos		(substituted on) 62'
MF	21	Rúben Neves		(substituted on) 81'
Manager:
(Spain) Roberto Martínez

GK	1	Dominik Livaković
RB	2	Josip Stanišić
CB	6	Josip Šutalo
CB	3	Marin Pongračić
LB	14	Ivan Perišić	(yellow card) 90+8'
CM	10	Luka Modrić (c)	(yellow card) 59'
CM	8	Mateo Kovačić		(substituted off) 90+6'
RW	13	Nikola Vlašić		(substituted off) 90+2'
AM	17	Petar Sučić
LW	16	Martin Baturina		(substituted off) 68'
CF	11	Ante Budimir		(substituted off) 46'
Substitutions:
FW	20	Igor Matanović		(substituted on) 46'
MF	15	Mario Pašalić		(substituted on) 68'
DF	4	Joško Gvardiol		(substituted on) 90+2'
FW	9	Andrej Kramarić		(substituted on) 90+6'
Manager:
Zlatko Dalić

Man of the Match:
Cristiano Ronaldo (Portugal)

Assistant referees:
Jan Erik Engan (Norway)
Isaak Bashevkin (Norway)
Fourth official:
Abongile Tom (South Africa)
Reserve assistant referee:
Zakhele Siwela (South Africa)
Video assistant referee:
Jarred Gillett (England)
Assistant video assistant referee:
Dennis Higler (Netherlands)
Support video assistant referee:
Marco Di Bello (Italy)

=== Switzerland vs Algeria ===
The teams have met on two previous occasions, both of them friendly matches (in 1983 and 1986). Switzerland have won both of these encounters, with a 2–0 victory in the 1986 match.

Switzerland went in front at 10 minutes, when Johan Manzambi made a run down the left before cutting the ball back low, allowing Breel Embolo to score from close range. Dan Ndoye made it 2–0 46 seconds into the second-half, with a right-footed finish to the left of the net from just inside the penalty area, after the ball broke to him from a defensive clearance error.

This was Switzerland's first win in the knockout stages since 1938, when they defeated Germany.

July 2, 2026
8:00 p.m. UTC−7

Switzerland	2–0	Algeria
Embolo 10'; Ndoye 46'	(Note: "Switzerland vs Algeria | Round of 32 | FIFA World Cup 2026". FIFA. Retrieved July 3, 2026.; "Match Report – Round of 32 – Switzerland v. Algeria". FIFA. July 3, 2026. Retrieved July 3, 2026.; "Post match summary report – Round of 32 – Switzerland v. Algeria". FIFA. July 3, 2026. Retrieved July 3, 2026.)

BC Place, Vancouver
Attendance: 52,497
Referee: Yael Falcón (Argentina)

Switzerland	Algeria

GK	1	Gregor Kobel
RB	6	Denis Zakaria	(substituted off) 87'
CB	4	Nico Elvedi
CB	5	Manuel Akanji
LB	13	Ricardo Rodriguez
CM	8	Remo Freuler
CM	10	Granit Xhaka (c)
RW	11	Dan Ndoye	(substituted off) 87'
AM	9	Johan Manzambi	(substituted off) 70'
LW	17	Rubén Vargas	(substituted off) 70'
CF	7	Breel Embolo	(substituted off) 82'
Substitutions:
MF	22	Fabian Rieder	(substituted on) 70'
FW	19	Noah Okafor	(substituted on) 70'
FW	23	Zeki Amdouni	(substituted on) 82'
MF	20	Michel Aebischer	(substituted on) 87'
DF	3	Silvan Widmer	(substituted on) 87'
Manager:
Murat Yakin

GK	23	Luca Zidane
RB	17	Rafik Belghali		(substituted off) 82'
CB	2	Aïssa Mandi
CB	21	Ramy Bensebaini
LB	15	Rayan Aït-Nouri
DM	19	Nabil Bentaleb		(substituted off) 71'
CM	6	Ramiz Zerrouki		(substituted off) 58'
CM	10	Farès Chaïbi	(yellow card) 36'
RF	7	Riyad Mahrez (c)		(substituted off) 71'
CF	22	Ibrahim Maza
LF	8	Houssem Aouar		(substituted off) 58'
Substitutions:
DF	13	Jaouen Hadjam		(substituted on) 58'
FW	9	Amine Gouiri		(substituted on) 58'
FW	11	Anis Hadj Moussa		(substituted on) 71'
MF	14	Hicham Boudaoui	(yellow card) 72'	(substituted on) 71'
FW	20	Adil Boulbina		(substituted on) 82'
Manager:
(Bosnia and Herzegovina) Vladimir Petković

Man of the Match:
Breel Embolo (Switzerland)

Assistant referees:
Masimiliano Del Yesso (Argentina)
Facundo Rodriguez (Argentina)
Fourth official:
Kevin Ortega (Peru)
Reserve assistant referee:
Michael Orué (Peru)
Video assistant referee:
Hernán Mastrángelo (Argentina)
Assistant video assistant referee:
Erick Miranda (Mexico)
Support video assistant referee:
Juan Lara (Chile)

=== Australia vs Egypt ===
Pre-match ceremony between Australia and Egypt.

Australia and Egypt had met twice before, most recently in 2010, a 3–0 win for Egypt in a friendly.

This match was Egypt's first knockout fixture since 1934. There were initial concerns over Mohamed Salah's fitness due to a hamstring injury, and Egypt coach Hossam Hassan would not commit to starting him in the game, but he was eventually cleared to be in the starting lineup.

In the 13th minute of the first half, Egypt midfielder Emam Ashour headed in at the back post low to the left corner of the net after a cross from Karim Hafez from the right to put Egypt 1–0 ahead. Australia struggled to create many clear-cut chances, but were able to equalize via an own goal when Egypt player Mohamed Hany headed into his own net from six yards out after a cross form the left in the 55th minute. This made Hany only the second player in FIFA World Cup history to score two own goals in a single tournament, following Ivan Vutsov of Bulgaria in 1966.

The match went to extra time, and with one minute remaining, goalkeeper Patrick Beach, who had started in all of Australia's games in the tournament, was substituted off in favour of veteran goalkeeper Mathew Ryan. The substitution was surprising, since Beach had prevented the highest goal average than any other goalkeeper at the tournament. Ryan was unable to save any of the penalties taken by Egypt, and Australian players Harry Souttar and Lucas Herrington both sent their kicks over the crossbar. Hossam Abdelmaguid got the winning penalty for Egypt with a low shot to the left corner, sending the goalkeeper the wrong way.

After the match, in his press conference, Australia coach Tony Popovic said his surprise decision to substitute in-form keeper Beach for Ryan was down to Ryan's additional experience. Neither Beach nor Ryan were aware the change would occur.

Ashour's goal was his second of the tournament and the sixth overall for Egypt, which exceeded Egypt's total goal tally across their previous three World Cup appearances in 1934, 1990 and 2018.

This fixture was Australia's third failed attempt at winning a knockout fixture at a World Cup, as well as being the second and last AFC team to have failed to win the Round of 32 after Japan's loss to Brazil, having previously lost to Argentina in 2022 and Italy in 2006, both of whom were future World Cup champions.

For Egypt, this was their first ever win in the knockout stages of a World Cup, and they progressed to the round of 16 to face Argentina.

July 3, 2026
1:00 p.m. UTC−5

Australia	1–1 (a.e.t.)	Egypt
Hany 55' (o.g.)	(Note: "Australia vs Egypt | Round of 32 | FIFA World Cup 2026". FIFA. Retrieved July 3, 2026.; "Match Report – Round of 32 – Australia v. Egypt". FIFA. July 3, 2026. Retrieved July 3, 2026.; "Post match summary report – Round of 32 – Australia v. Egypt". FIFA. July 3, 2026. Retrieved July 4, 2026.)	Ashour 13'
Penalties
Souttar (penalty missed); Irvine (penalty scored); Mabil (penalty scored); Herrington (penalty missed)	2–4	(penalty scored) Saber; (penalty scored) Rabia; (penalty scored) Salah; (penalty scored) Abdelmaguid

AT&T Stadium, Arlington
Attendance: 70,244
Referee: Gustavo Tejera (Uruguay)

Australia	Egypt

GK	18	Patrick Beach	(substituted off) 119'
CB	3	Alessandro Circati
CB	19	Harry Souttar (c)
CB	25	Lucas Herrington
RM	5	Jordan Bos	(substituted off) 46'
CM	22	Jackson Irvine
CM	13	Aiden O'Neill	(substituted off) 91'
LM	16	Aziz Behich
RF	20	Cristian Volpato	(substituted off) 74'
CF	17	Nestory Irankunda	(substituted off) 74'
LF	8	Connor Metcalfe	(substituted off) 91'
Substitutions:
DF	15	Kai Trewin	(substituted on) 46'
FW	10	Ajdin Hrustic	(substituted on) 74'
FW	9	Mohamed Touré	(substituted on) 74'
MF	24	Paul Okon-Engstler	(substituted on) 91'
FW	11	Awer Mabil	(substituted on) 91'
GK	1	Mathew Ryan	(substituted on) 119'
Manager:
Tony Popovic

GK	23	Mostafa Shobeir
RB	3	Mohamed Hany
CB	2	Yasser Ibrahim	(yellow card) 120'
CB	5	Ramy Rabia
LB	15	Karim Hafez		(substituted off) 80'
RM	8	Emam Ashour
CM	14	Hamdy Fathy		(substituted off) 67'
CM	19	Marwan Attia		(substituted off) 120+1'
LM	11	Mostafa Ziko		(substituted off) 67'
CF	10	Mohamed Salah (c)
CF	22	Omar Marmoush		(substituted off) 106'
Substitutions:
FW	12	Haissem Hassan	(yellow card) 105'	(substituted on) 67'
DF	4	Hossam Abdelmaguid		(substituted on) 67'
FW	7	Trézéguet		(substituted on) 80'
FW	9	Hamza Abdelkarim		(substituted on) 106'
MF	21	Mahmoud Saber		(substituted on) 120+1'
Other disciplinary actions:
TS	—	Saafan El-Sagheer	(yellow card) 91'
Manager:
Hossam Hassan

Man of the Match:
Mohamed Salah (Egypt)

Assistant referees:
Carlos Barreiro (Uruguay)
Nicolas Taran (Uruguay)
Fourth official:
Sandro Schärer (Switzerland)
Reserve assistant referee:
Stéphane De Almeida (Switzerland)
Video assistant referee:
Leodán González (Uruguay)
Assistant video assistant referee:
Antonio García (Uruguay)
Support video assistant referee:
Bastian Dankert (Germany)

=== Argentina vs Cape Verde ===
The two teams had never met before. In their World Cup debut, Cape Verde qualified for the Round of 32 undefeated after drawing their three group games. They entered the fixture as the smallest nation to ever play in a World Cup knockout match.

In the 29th minute, Argentine captain Lionel Messi made his run in behind the Cape Verde defense on the right, controlling the ball with his left foot from a long pass by Lisandro Martínez before firing it home from close range high to the near post from the right. This marked Messi's seventh goal at the 2026 FIFA World Cup, giving Argentina a 1–0 lead at halftime.

Cape Verde got an equalizer in the 59th minute through Deroy Duarte, when he had a touch on the inside of his right foot and shot low beyond Emiliano Martínez towards the far left corner from the right of the six yard box. Vozinha had several saves in stoppage time, sending the match into extra time.

Two minutes into extra time, Lisandro Martínez collected the ball from a corner kick from the left, before turning back in and sending it left-footed beyond Vozinha into the top right corner of the net, giving Argentina the lead. Eleven minutes later, Sidny Lopes Cabral found the ball in the Argentinian half. Entering from the left side of the penalty area, he curled right-footed past the goalkeeper and into the top right corner of the net to make it 2–2. This was later voted as the FIFA goal of the tournament by the public.

In the 111th minute, Messi delivered a corner kick from the left with the ball deflecting off the head of Cristian Romero, and then off the arm of Diney Borges and dropping into the right corner of the net for an own goal.

With this win, Argentina progressed to the round of 16, eliminating Cape Verde, the only tournament debutant out of the four to reach the knockouts after an unbeaten run in the group stage. During a post-match press conference, Argentina head coach Lionel Scaloni praised Cape Verde for their defensive discipline and competitive performance, which forced the defending champions into extra time.

Following their elimination from the tournament against reigning world champions Argentina, the Cape Verde football team were welcomed back to Praia by thousands of supporters, which coincided with Cape Verde's independence day. Coach Bubista expressed his pride at his team being minutes away from forcing Argentina into a penalty shootout, and demonstrating that they can compete with the best teams in the world.

July 3, 2026
6:00 p.m. UTC−4

Argentina	3–2 (a.e.t.)	Cape Verde
Messi 29'; Li. Martínez 92'; Diney 111' (o.g.)	(Note: "Argentina vs Cabo Verde | Round of 32 | FIFA World Cup 2026". FIFA. Retrieved July 4, 2026.; "Match Report – Round of 32 – Argentina v. Cabo Verde". FIFA. July 4, 2026. Retrieved July 4, 2026.; "Post match summary report – Round of 32 – Argentina v. Cabo Verde". FIFA. July 3, 2026. Retrieved July 4, 2026.)	D. Duarte 59'; Lopes Cabral 103'

Hard Rock Stadium, Miami Gardens
Attendance: 64,478
Referee: Drew Fischer (Canada)

Argentina	Cape Verde

GK	23	Emiliano Martínez
RB	26	Nahuel Molina		(substituted off) 104'
CB	13	Cristian Romero
CB	6	Lisandro Martínez
LB	25	Facundo Medina		(substituted off) 85'
RM	7	Rodrigo De Paul		(substituted off) 84'
CM	20	Alexis Mac Allister
CM	24	Enzo Fernández
LM	16	Thiago Almada		(substituted off) 63'
CF	10	Lionel Messi (c)
CF	22	Lautaro Martínez		(substituted off) 63'
Substitutions:
MF	15	Nicolás González		(substituted on) 63'
FW	9	Julián Alvarez		(substituted on) 63'
MF	5	Leandro Paredes		(substituted on) 84'
DF	3	Nicolás Tagliafico		(substituted on) 85'
DF	4	Gonzalo Montiel	(yellow card) 115'	(substituted on) 104'
Manager:
Lionel Scaloni

GK	1	Vozinha
RB	22	Steven Moreira
CB	4	Pico
CB	3	Diney
LB	13	Sidny Lopes Cabral
DM	6	Kevin Pina	(yellow card) 68'	(substituted off) 100'
RM	20	Ryan Mendes (c)		(substituted off) 80'
CM	15	Laros Duarte		(substituted off) 67'
CM	14	Deroy Duarte		(substituted off) 100'
LM	7	Jovane Cabral		(substituted off) 80'
CF	21	Nuno da Costa		(substituted off) 67'
Substitutions:
MF	10	Jamiro Monteiro		(substituted on) 67'
FW	19	Dailon Livramento		(substituted on) 67'
MF	17	Willy Semedo		(substituted on) 80'
MF	26	Hélio Varela		(substituted on) 80'
MF	16	Yannick Semedo		(substituted on) 100'
FW	9	Gilson Benchimol		(substituted on) 100'
Manager:
Bubista

Man of the Match:
Lionel Messi (Argentina)

Assistant referees:
Micheal Barwegen (Canada)
Lyes Arfa (Canada)
Fourth official:
Katia García (Mexico)
Reserve assistant referee:
Sandra Ramírez (Mexico)
Video assistant referee:
Armando Villarreal (United States)
Assistant video assistant referee:
Ivan Bebek (Croatia)
Support video assistant referee:
Tatiana Guzmán (Nicaragua)

=== Colombia vs Ghana ===
The two teams had never met before.

In the 14th minute, Jhon Arias scored the only goal of the match with a low side foot volley to the right corner from six yards out after a cross from Luis Díaz from the right. While they got eight shots, Ghana failed to register a shot on target during the game. Meanwhile, Colombia had 20 shots, eight of which were on target. Colombia had a possession stat of 62%, compared to Ghana's 38%. Ghana completed a total of 349 passes, which pales in comparison to Colombia's 576.

With Colombia's win, they advanced to the Round of 16, whereas for Ghana, this was the first time they failed to advance further from the knockout stages after 2010, in which they made it to the Quarterfinals.

July 3, 2026
8:30 p.m. UTC−5

Colombia	1–0	Ghana
J. Arias 14'	(Note: "Colombia vs Ghana | Round of 32 | FIFA World Cup 2026". FIFA. July 4, 2026. Retrieved July 4, 2026.; "Match Report – Round of 32 – Colombia v. Ghana". FIFA. July 4, 2026. Retrieved July 4, 2026.; "Post match summary report – Round of 32 – Colombia v. Ghana". FIFA. July 3, 2026. Retrieved July 4, 2026.)

Arrowhead Stadium, Kansas City
Attendance: 69,045
Referee: Clément Turpin (France)

Colombia	Ghana

GK	12	Camilo Vargas
RB	2	Daniel Muñoz
CB	23	Davinson Sánchez
CB	3	Jhon Lucumí
LB	17	Johan Mojica
DM	16	Jefferson Lerma
CM	14	Gustavo Puerta
CM	11	Jhon Arias	(yellow card) 12'	(substituted off) 72'
RF	10	James Rodríguez (c)		(substituted off) 46'
CF	9	Jhon Córdoba		(substituted off) 8'
LF	7	Luis Díaz		(substituted off) 90'
Substitutions:
FW	25	Luis Suárez		(substituted on) 8'
MF	6	Richard Ríos	(yellow card) 78'	(substituted on) 46'
MF	20	Juan Quintero		(substituted on) 72'
FW	21	Jaminton Campaz		(substituted on) 90'
Manager:
(Argentina) Néstor Lorenzo

GK	1	Lawrence Ati-Zigi
RB	26	Marvin Senaya		(substituted off) 13'
CB	23	Derrick Luckassen
CB	18	Jerome Opoku
LB	14	Gideon Mensah
DM	5	Thomas Partey
CM	3	Caleb Yirenkyi	(yellow card) 49'	(substituted off) 79'
CM	8	Kwasi Sibo		(substituted off) 62'
RF	19	Iñaki Williams		(substituted off) 62'
CF	9	Jordan Ayew (c)		(substituted off) 79'
LF	11	Antoine Semenyo
Substitutions:
DF	2	Alidu Seidu	(yellow card) 76'	(substituted on) 13'
FW	7	Abdul Fatawu	(yellow card) 66'	(substituted on) 62'
MF	15	Elisha Owusu		(substituted on) 62'
FW	25	Prince Adu		(substituted on) 79'
FW	24	Ernest Nuamah		(substituted on) 79'
Manager:
(Portugal) Carlos Queiroz

Man of the Match:
Luis Díaz (Colombia)

Assistant referees:
Nicolas Danos (France)
Benjamin Pagès (France)
Fourth official:
Alejandro Hernández Hernández (Spain)
Reserve assistant referee:
José Enrique Naranjo Pérez (Spain)
Video assistant referee:
Jérôme Brisard (France)
Assistant video assistant referee:
Willy Delajod (France)
Support video assistant referee:
Fu Ming (China)
