= List of FIFA Women's World Cup penalty shoot-outs =

This is a list of all penalty shoot-outs that have occurred in the Finals tournament of the FIFA Women's World Cup.

Twice, in 1999 and 2011, the World Cup title has been decided by a penalty shoot-out. Of the 11 shoot-outs that have taken place in the competition, three reached the sudden death stage after still being tied at the end of "best of five kicks". Of these, two of the most recent (at the 2023 FIFA Women's World Cup) were the longest shoot-outs in either women's or men's World Cup history.

== Penalty shoot-outs ==
Key

- (penalty scored) = scored penalty
- (penalty missed) = missed penalty
- golden background = scored penalty ending the shoot-out
- red background = missed penalty ending the shoot-out
- grey background = first penalty in the shoot-out
- horizontal line within a list of takers = beginning of the sudden death stage

Penalty shoot-outs in the FIFA Women's World Cup
№	Year	Round	Winner	F	Loser	Penalties			Winning team		Losing team		Date	Venue	R
№	Year	Round	Winner	F	Loser	S	M	T	GK	Takers	Takers	GK	Date	Venue	R
1.	1995, Sweden	Quarter-finals	China	1–1	Sweden	4–3	1–2	5–5	Gao Hong	Sun Wen (penalty scored); Xie Huilin (penalty scored); Chen Yufeng (penalty scored); Shui Qingxia (penalty scored); Liu Ailing (penalty missed)	Andersson (penalty missed); Videkull (penalty scored); Pohjanen (penalty scored); Sundhage (penalty scored); Nessvold (penalty missed)	Leidinge	13 June 1995	Helsingborg (Olympia)	
2.	1999, United States	Third place play-off	Brazil	0–0 (Note: No extra time was played before proceeding to a penalty shoot-out.)	Norway	5–4	1–2	6–6	Maravilha	Pretinha (penalty missed); Cidinha (penalty scored); Kátia (penalty scored); Maicon (penalty scored); Nenê (penalty scored) Formiga (penalty scored)	Riise (penalty scored); Pettersen (penalty scored); Jørgensen (penalty missed); Sandaune (penalty scored); Gulbrandsen (penalty scored) Aarønes (penalty missed)	Nordby	10 July 1999	Pasadena (Rose Bowl)	
3.	1999, United States	Final	United States	0–0	China	5–4	0–1	5–5	Scurry	Overbeck (penalty scored); Fawcett (penalty scored); Lilly (penalty scored); Hamm (penalty scored); Chastain (penalty scored)	Xie Huilin (penalty scored); Qiu Haiyan (penalty scored); Liu Ying (penalty missed); Zhang Ouying (penalty scored); Sun Wen (penalty scored)	Gao Hong	10 July 1999	Pasadena (Rose Bowl)	
4.	2011, Germany	Quarter-finals	France	1–1	England	4–3	1–2	5–5	Deville	Abily (penalty missed); Bussaglia (penalty scored); Thiney (penalty scored); Bompastor (penalty scored); Le Sommer (penalty scored)	K. Smith (penalty scored); Carney (penalty scored); Stoney (penalty scored); Rafferty (penalty missed); White (penalty missed)	Bardsley	9 July 2011	Leverkusen (BayArena)	
5.	2011, Germany	Quarter-finals	United States	2–2	Brazil	5–3	0–1	5–4	Solo	Boxx (penalty scored); Lloyd (penalty scored); Wambach (penalty scored); Rapinoe (penalty scored); Krieger (penalty scored)	Cristiane (penalty scored); Marta (penalty scored); Daiane (penalty missed); Francielle (penalty scored)	Andréia	10 July 2011	Dresden (Rudolf-Harbig-Stadion)	
6.	2011, Germany	Final	Japan	2–2	United States	3–1	1–3	4–4	Kaihori	Miyama (penalty scored); Nagasato (penalty missed); Sakaguchi (penalty scored); Kumagai (penalty scored)	Boxx (penalty missed); Lloyd (penalty missed); Heath (penalty missed); Wambach (penalty scored)	Solo	17 July 2011	Frankfurt (Waldstadion)	
7.	2015, Canada	Quarter-finals	Germany	1–1	France	5–4	0–1	5–5	Angerer	Behringer (penalty scored); Laudehr (penalty scored); Peter (penalty scored); Marozsán (penalty scored); Šašić (penalty scored)	Thiney (penalty scored); Abily (penalty scored); Nécib (penalty scored); Renard (penalty scored); Lavogez (penalty missed)	Bouhaddi	26 June 2015	Montreal (Olympic Stadium)	
8.	2019, France	Round of 16	Norway	1–1	Australia	4–1	0–2	4–3	Hjelmseth	C. Hansen (penalty scored); Reiten (penalty scored); Mjelde (penalty scored); Engen (penalty scored)	Kerr (penalty missed); Gielnik (penalty missed); Catley (penalty scored)	Williams	22 June 2019	Nice (Allianz Riviera)	
9.	2023, Australia / New Zealand	Round of 16	Sweden	0–0	United States	5–4	2–3	7–7	Mušović	Rolfö (penalty scored); Rubensson (penalty scored); Björn (penalty missed); Blomqvist (penalty missed); Bennison (penalty scored) Eriksson (penalty scored); Hurtig (penalty scored)	Sullivan (penalty scored); Horan (penalty scored); Mewis (penalty scored); Rapinoe (penalty missed); S. Smith (penalty missed) Naeher (penalty scored); O'Hara (penalty missed)	Naeher	6 August 2023	Melbourne (Melbourne Rectangular Stadium)	
10.	2023, Australia / New Zealand	Round of 16	England	0–0	Nigeria	4–2	1–2	5–4	Earps	Stanway (penalty missed); England (penalty scored); Daly (penalty scored); Greenwood (penalty scored); Kelly (penalty scored)	Oparanozie (penalty missed); Alozie (penalty missed); Ajibade (penalty scored); Ucheibe (penalty scored)	Nnadozie	7 August 2023	Brisbane (Lang Park)	
11.	2023, Australia / New Zealand	Quarter-finals	Australia	0–0	France	7–6	3–4	10–10	Arnold	Foord (penalty scored); Catley (penalty missed); Kerr (penalty scored); Fowler (penalty scored); Arnold (penalty missed) Gorry (penalty scored); Yallop (penalty scored); Carpenter (penalty scored); Hunt (penalty missed); Vine (penalty scored)	Bacha (penalty missed); Diani (penalty scored); Renard (penalty scored); Le Sommer (penalty scored); Périsset (penalty missed) Geyoro (penalty scored); Karchaoui (penalty scored); Lakrar (penalty scored); Dali (penalty missed); Bècho (penalty missed)	Durand	12 August 2023	Brisbane (Lang Park)	

== Statistics ==
Key

- † = shoot-out in the Women's World Cup final
- **Bold** = won championship that year

=== Shoot-out records ===
Most shoot-outs in a tournament

- **3** - 2011, 2023

Fewest shoot-outs in a tournament

- **0** - 1991, 2003, 2007

Most played shoot-out

- **1** - 11 matches

Most penalties in a shoot-out

- **20** - Australia vs France (2023)

Fewest penalties in a shoot-out

- **7** - Norway vs Australia (2019)

Fewest scores in a shoot-out

- **4** - Japan vs United States (2011†)

Most misses in a shoot-out

- **7** - Australia vs France (2023)

Most consecutive misses in a shoot-out

- **4** – Sweden vs United States (2023)

Most scored in a shoot-out

- **13** - Australia vs France (2023)

Most consecutive scored in a shoot-out

- **9** – Germany vs France (2015)

=== Team records ===
Most played

- **4** - United States (**1999**, 2011(x2), 2023)

Most played in one tournament

- **2** - United States (2011) 1/1

Most won

- **2** - United States (**1999†**, 2011)

Most lost

- **2** - United States (2011†, 2023)
- **2** - France (2015, 2023)

Most consecutive wins

- **2** - United States (**1999†**, 2011)

Most consecutive losses

- **2** - United States (2011†, 2023)
- **2** - France (2015, 2023)

Most won without ever losing

- **1** - Germany (2015)
- **1** - Japan (**2011†**)

Most lost without ever winning

- **1** - Nigeria (2023)

Most knockout matches played, never playing a shoot-out

- **7** - Netherlands (2015, 2019×4, 2023×2)

Won shoot-out and eventually won the cup

- United States (1999†)
- Japan (2011†)

Won the cup without having to play any shoot-outs

- United States (1991, 2015, 2019)
- Norway (1995)
- Germany (2003, 2007)
- Spain (2023)

=== Taker records ===
Most participations in shoot-outs

- **2** – (China) Sun Wen (1995, 1999†)
- **2** – (China) Xie Huilin (1995, 1999†)
- **2** – (United States) Shannon Boxx (2011 (×2)†)
- **2** – (United States) Carli Lloyd (2011 (×2)†)
- **2** – (United States) Abby Wambach (2011 (×2)†)
- **2** – (France) Camille Abily (2011, 2015)
- **2** – (France) Gaëtane Thiney (2011, 2015)
- **2** – (United States) Megan Rapinoe (2011†, 2023)
- **2** – (France) Eugénie Le Sommer (2011, 2023)
- **2** – (France) Wendie Renard (2015, 2023)
- **2** – (Australia) Steph Catley (2019, 2023)
- **2** – (Australia) Sam Kerr (2019, 2023)

Most penalties scored

- **2** – (China) Sun Wen (1995, 1999†)
- **2** – (China) Xie Huilin (1995, 1999†)
- **2** – (United States) Abby Wambach (2011 (×2)†)
- **2** – (France) Gaëtane Thiney (2011, 2015)
- **2** – (France) Eugénie Le Sommer (2011, 2023)
- **2** – (France) Wendie Renard (2015, 2023)

Most penalties scored in one tournament

- **2** – (United States) Abby Wambach (2011†)

=== Goalkeeper records ===
Most participations in shoot-outs

- **2** – (China) Gao Hong (1995, 1999†)
- **2** – (United States) Hope Solo (2011 (×2))

Most penalties taken against

- **10** – (China) Gao Hong
- **10** – (Australia) Mackenzie Arnold
- **10** – (France) Solène Durand

Most penalties scored against

- **8** – (China) Gao Hong

Most penalties missed against (Note: Includes saves, shots onto the bar, and shots wide.)

- **4** – (Australia) Mackenzie Arnold

Most penalties missed against in one shoot-out

- **4** – (Australia) Mackenzie Arnold

=== By team ===
Penalty shoot-out statistics by team
Team	Played	Win	Loss	% Win	Win Year	Loss Year	S	A	S %
United States	4	2	2	50%	**1999†**, 2011	2011†, 2023	15	21	71%
France	3	1	2	33%	2011	2015, 2023	14	20	70%
China	2	1	1	50%	1995	1999†	8	10	80%
Brazil	2	1	1	50%	1999	2011	8	10	80%
Norway	2	1	1	50%	2019	1999	8	10	80%
England	2	1	1	50%	2023	2011	7	10	70%
Sweden	2	1	1	50%	2023	1995	8	12	67%
Australia	2	1	1	50%	2023	2019	8	13	61%
Germany	1	1	0	100%	2015	-	5	5	100%
Japan	1	1	0	100%	**2011†**	-	3	4	75%
Nigeria	1	0	1	0%	-	2023	2	4	50%

=== By tournament ===
Penalty shoot-outs by tournaments
Year	Teams	Knock-out matches	Matches with extra time	Penalty shoot-outs	Percentage of extra time matches	Percentage of matches with penalties	Penalties scored	Penalty attempts	Penalty score rate
1991	12	8	2	0	25.0%	0.0%	-	-	-
1995	12	8	1	1	12.5%	12.5%	7	10	70.0%
1999	16	8	2 (Note: No extra time was played in Third place play-off before proceeding to a penalty shoot-out.)	2	25%	25%	18	22	81.8%
2003	16	8	1	0	12.5%	0.0%	-	-	-
2007	16	8	0	0	0.0%	0.0%	-	-	-
2011	16	8	**4**	**3**	**50%**	**37.5%**	19	27	70.0%
2015	24	16	2	1	12.5%	6.2%	9	10	**90.0%**
2019	24	16	3	1	18.8%	6.2%	5	7	71.4%
2023	32	16	**4**	**3**	25.0%	18.8%	**28**	**43**	65.1%
Total		96	19	11	19.8%	11.5%	86	119	72.2%

== See also ==
- List of FIFA World Cup penalty shoot-outs
