= José Canale =

Paraguayan footballer (born 1996)

José María Canale
- Canale with Paraguay in the 2026 FIFA World Cup

Personal information
- Full name: José María Canale Domínguez
- Date of birth: 20 July 1996 (age 30)
- Place of birth: Itauguá, Paraguay
- Height: 1.87 m (6 ft 2 in)
- Position: Centre-back

Team information
- Current team: Lanús
- Number: 13

Youth career
- 2012–2015: Libertad

Senior career*
Years	Team	Apps	(Gls)
2015–2023	Libertad	44	(0)
2017	→ Nacional (loan)	20	(0)
2020	→ Sol de América (loan)	22	(2)
2021	→ Newell's Old Boys (loan)	11	(0)
2022	→ Godoy Cruz (loan)	14	(0)
2023–	Lanús	49	(5)
2024–2025	→ Querétaro (loan)	22	(1)

International career^{‡}
2026–	Paraguay	6	(0)
- * Club domestic league appearances and goals as of 17:14, 6 June 2026 (UTC) ‡ National team caps and goals as of 23:30, 4 July 2026 (UTC)

José María Canale Domínguez (born 20 July 1996) is a Paraguayan professional footballer who plays as a centre-back for Argentine Primera División side Lanús and the Paraguay national team.

== Club career ==
Canale debuted for Libertad on 28 May 2015 in a 3–0 win against San Lorenzo in the Paraguayan Primera División.

On 29 July 2021, he moved to Argentina to join Newell's Old Boys on loan.

On 7 December 2022, he left Libertad permanently to join Lanús. In August 2024, he joined Liga MX side Querétaro on loan, with an option to buy.

== International career ==
On 29 June 2026, during the round of 32 in the 2026 FIFA World Cup, Canale scored the penalty that eliminated Germany from the competition, as well as ending Germany's record of not losing a penalty shoot out since 1976.

== Career statistics ==
=== International ===
As of 4 July 2026

Appearances and goals by national team and year
National team	Year	Apps	Goals
Paraguay	2026	6	0
Total		6	0

== Honours ==
Libertad

- Paraguayan Primera División: 2016

Lanús

- Copa Sudamericana: 2025
- Recopa Sudamericana: 2026
