= 2025 Africa Cup of Nations squads =

The 2025 Africa Cup of Nations was an international football tournament held in Morocco from 21 December 2025 to 18 January 2026. The 24 participating national teams were required to register a squad with a maximum 28 players.

The age listed for each player is on 21 December 2025, the first day of the tournament. The numbers of caps and goals listed for each player do not include any matches played after the start of the tournament. The club listed is the club for which the player last played a competitive match before the tournament. (Note: This is the club a player was last able to play for during the previous season in the event a player did not play a competitive match.) The nationality for each club reflects the national association (not the league) to which the club is affiliated. A flag is included for coaches who are of a different nationality than their own national team.

== Group A ==
=== Comoros ===
Comoros's 26 player squad was announced on 11 December.

Head coach: (Canada) Stefano Cusin

No.	Pos.	Player	Date of birth (age)	Caps	Goals	Club
1	GK	Salim Ben Boina	19 July 1991 (aged 34)	25	0	(French Football Federation) Istres
2	DF	Ismaël Boura	14 August 2000 (aged 25)	5	0	(French Football Federation) Troyes
3	DF	Abdel-Hakim Abdallah	18 August 1997 (aged 28)	19	0	(French Football Federation) Guingamp
4	DF	Kenan Toibibou	9 December 2004 (aged 21)	0	0	(Football Association of Slovenia) Bravo
5	DF	Ahmed Soilihi	1 July 1996 (aged 29)	14	0	(French Football Federation) Toulon
6	MF	Iyad Mohamed	5 March 2001 (aged 24)	19	0	(Portuguese Football Federation) Casa Pia
7	FW	Faïz Selemani	14 November 1993 (aged 32)	41	7	(Qatar Football Association) Qatar SC
8	DF	Yannis Kari	2 November 2000 (aged 25)	5	0	(French Football Federation) Fréjus Saint-Raphaël
9	FW	Aboubacar Ali	2 April 2006 (aged 19)	2	0	(Royal Belgian Football Association) Francs Borains
10	MF	Youssouf M'Changama (captain)	29 August 1990 (aged 35)	67	13	(Saudi Arabian Football Federation) Al-Batin
11	FW	Rafiki Saïd	15 March 2000 (aged 25)	13	7	(Royal Belgian Football Association) Standard Liège
12	DF	Kassim M'Dahoma	26 January 1997 (aged 28)	36	1	(French Football Federation) Aubagne
13	FW	Aymeric Ahmed	8 November 2003 (aged 22)	6	0	(French Football Federation) Strasbourg
14	MF	Rémy Vita	1 April 2001 (aged 24)	5	0	(Portuguese Football Federation) Tondela
15	MF	Benjaloud Youssouf	11 February 1994 (aged 31)	47	4	(French Football Federation) Sochaux
16	GK	Yannick Pandor	1 May 2001 (aged 24)	11	0	(Royal Belgian Football Association) Francs Borains
17	FW	Myziane Maolida	14 February 1999 (aged 26)	13	4	(Saudi Arabian Football Federation) Al-Kholood
18	MF	Yacine Bourhane	30 September 1998 (aged 27)	29	1	(Cyprus Football Association) Aris Limassol
20	FW	Zaïd Amir	11 May 2002 (aged 23)	2	2	(French Football Federation) Istres
21	FW	El Fardou Ben Nabouhane	10 June 1989 (aged 36)	41	16	(Football Association of Serbia) Zemun
22	DF	Saïd Bakari	22 September 1994 (aged 31)	43	1	(Royal Dutch Football Association) Sparta Rotterdam
23	GK	Adel Anzimati	5 November 2001 (aged 24)	6	0	(Football Federation of Armenia) Ararat Yerevan
25	DF	Idris Mohamed	25 November 2003 (aged 22)	0	0	(French Football Federation) Le Puy
26	MF	Raouf Mroivili	14 January 1999 (aged 26)	1	0	(French Football Federation) Villefranche
27	MF	Rayan Lutin	16 January 2003 (aged 22)	6	0	(French Football Federation) Amiens
28	MF	Zaydou Youssouf	11 July 1999 (aged 26)	5	0	(Saudi Arabian Football Federation) Al-Fateh

=== Mali ===
Mali announced their final squad of 28 players on 11 December.

Head coach: (Belgium) Tom Saintfiet

No.	Pos.	Player	Date of birth (age)	Caps	Goals	Club
1	GK	Ismael Diawara	11 November 1994 (aged 31)	10	0	(Swedish Football Association) Sirius
2	DF	Hamari Traoré	27 January 1992 (aged 33)	59	3	(French Football Federation) Paris FC
3	DF	Amadou Dante	7 October 2000 (aged 25)	15	0	(Portuguese Football Federation) Arouca
4	MF	Amadou Haidara	31 January 1998 (aged 27)	47	2	(German Football Association) RB Leipzig
5	DF	Abdoulaye Diaby	4 July 2000 (aged 25)	9	0	(Swiss Football Association) Grasshopper
6	DF	Sikou Niakaté	10 July 1999 (aged 26)	14	1	(Portuguese Football Federation) Braga
7	FW	Dorgeles Nene	23 December 2002 (aged 22)	27	9	(Turkish Football Federation) Fenerbahçe
8	MF	Mahamadou Doumbia	15 May 2004 (aged 21)	1	0	(Saudi Arabian Football Federation) Al-Ittihad
9	FW	El Bilal Touré	3 October 2001 (aged 24)	25	9	(Turkish Football Federation) Beşiktaş
10	MF	Yves Bissouma (captain)	30 August 1996 (aged 29)	42	5	(The Football Association) Tottenham Hotspur
11	MF	Lassana Coulibaly	10 April 1996 (aged 29)	50	1	(Italian Football Federation) Lecce
12	MF	Mohamed Camara	6 January 2000 (aged 25)	34	3	(Qatar Football Association) Al-Sadd
13	DF	Fodé Doucouré	3 February 2001 (aged 24)	7	0	(French Football Federation) Le Havre
14	FW	Mamadou Camara	7 February 2001 (aged 24)	3	0	(French Football Federation) Laval
15	DF	Mamadou Fofana	21 January 1998 (aged 27)	48	1	(United States Soccer Federation) New England Revolution
16	GK	Djigui Diarra	27 February 1995 (aged 30)	61	0	(Tanzania Football Federation) Young Africans
17	FW	Lassine Sinayoko	8 December 1999 (aged 26)	20	6	(French Football Federation) Auxerre
18	FW	Mamadou Doumbia	18 February 2006 (aged 19)	5	1	(The Football Association) Watford
19	MF	Kamory Doumbia	18 February 2003 (aged 22)	26	14	(French Football Federation) Brest
20	MF	Mamadou Sangaré	26 June 2002 (aged 23)	9	0	(French Football Federation) Lens
21	FW	Gaoussou Diarra	21 November 2002 (aged 23)	5	1	(Royal Dutch Football Association) Feyenoord
22	GK	Mamadou Samassa	16 February 1990 (aged 35)	18	0	(French Football Federation) Laval
23	MF	Aliou Dieng	15 October 1997 (aged 28)	41	2	(Egyptian Football Association) Al Ahly
24	MF	Ibrahima Sissoko	27 October 1997 (aged 28)	3	0	(German Football Association) VfL Bochum
25	DF	Ousmane Camara	6 March 2003 (aged 22)	3	0	(French Football Federation) Angers
26	DF	Woyo Coulibaly	26 May 1999 (aged 26)	2	0	(Italian Football Federation) Sassuolo
27	FW	Gaoussou Diakité	26 September 2005 (aged 20)	1	0	(Swiss Football Association) Lausanne-Sport
28	DF	Nathan Gassama	5 January 2001 (aged 24)	1	0	(Russian Football Union) Baltika Kaliningrad

=== Morocco ===
Morocco's final squad of 28 players was announced on 11 December.

Head coach: Walid Regragui

No.	Pos.	Player	Date of birth (age)	Caps	Goals	Club
1	GK	Yassine Bounou	5 April 1991 (aged 34)	80	0	(Saudi Arabian Football Federation) Al-Hilal
2	DF	Achraf Hakimi (captain)	4 November 1998 (aged 27)	88	11	(French Football Federation) Paris Saint-Germain
3	DF	Noussair Mazraoui	14 November 1997 (aged 28)	35	2	(The Football Association) Manchester United
4	MF	Sofyan Amrabat	21 August 1996 (aged 29)	70	0	(Royal Spanish Football Federation) Real Betis
5	DF	Nayef Aguerd	30 March 1996 (aged 29)	57	2	(French Football Federation) Marseille
6	DF	Romain Saïss	26 March 1990 (aged 35)	85	3	(Qatar Football Association) Al-Sadd
7	FW	Hamza Igamane	2 November 2002 (aged 23)	7	2	(French Football Federation) Lille
8	MF	Azzedine Ounahi	19 April 2000 (aged 25)	43	9	(Royal Spanish Football Federation) Girona
9	FW	Soufiane Rahimi	2 June 1996 (aged 29)	20	5	(United Arab Emirates Football Association) Al-Ain
10	FW	Brahim Díaz	3 August 1999 (aged 26)	15	8	(Royal Spanish Football Federation) Real Madrid
11	MF	Ismael Saibari	28 January 2001 (aged 24)	19	6	(Royal Dutch Football Association) PSV Eindhoven
12	GK	Munir Mohamedi	10 May 1989 (aged 36)	50	0	(Royal Moroccan Football Federation) RS Berkane
13	MF	Eliesse Ben Seghir	16 February 2005 (aged 20)	16	3	(German Football Association) Bayer Leverkusen
14	MF	Oussama Targhalline	20 May 2002 (aged 23)	7	0	(Royal Dutch Football Association) Feyenoord
15	DF	Mohamed Chibi	21 January 1993 (aged 32)	9	1	(Egyptian Football Association) Pyramids
16	FW	Ilias Akhomach	16 April 2004 (aged 21)	10	0	(Royal Spanish Football Federation) Villarreal
17	FW	Abde Ezzalzouli	17 December 2001 (aged 24)	26	2	(Royal Spanish Football Federation) Real Betis
18	DF	Jawad El Yamiq	29 February 1992 (aged 33)	27	3	(Saudi Arabian Football Federation) Al-Najma
19	FW	Youssef En-Nesyri	1 June 1997 (aged 28)	85	25	(Turkish Football Federation) Fenerbahçe
20	FW	Ayoub El Kaabi	25 June 1993 (aged 32)	47	17	(Hellenic Football Federation) Olympiacos
21	FW	Chemsdine Talbi	9 May 2005 (aged 20)	2	0	(The Football Association) Sunderland
22	GK	El Mehdi Al Harrar	30 November 2000 (aged 25)	0	0	(Royal Moroccan Football Federation) Raja CA
23	MF	Bilal El Khannouss	10 May 2004 (aged 21)	26	2	(German Football Association) VfB Stuttgart
24	MF	Neil El Aynaoui	2 July 2001 (aged 24)	6	0	(Italian Football Federation) Roma
25	DF	Adam Masina	2 January 1994 (aged 31)	23	0	(Italian Football Federation) Torino
26	DF	Anass Salah-Eddine	18 January 2002 (aged 23)	2	0	(Royal Dutch Football Association) PSV Eindhoven
27	DF	Abdelhamid Aït Boudlal	16 April 2006 (aged 19)	1	0	(French Football Federation) Rennes
28	DF	Youssef Belammari	20 September 1998 (aged 27)	9	0	(Royal Moroccan Football Federation) Raja CA

=== Zambia ===
Zambia's 28 player squad was announced on 10 December.

Head coach: Moses Sichone

No.	Pos.	Player	Date of birth (age)	Caps	Goals	Club
1	GK	Willard Mwanza	3 June 1997 (aged 28)	1	0	(Football Association of Zambia) Power Dynamos
2	DF	Mathews Banda	6 August 2005 (aged 20)	4	0	(Football Association of Zambia) Nkana
3	DF	Obino Chisala	14 September 1999 (aged 26)	7	0	(Sudan Football Association) Al-Merrikh
4	DF	Frankie Musonda	12 December 1997 (aged 28)	19	1	(Bahrain Football Association) Bahrain SC
5	MF	Miguel Chaiwa	7 June 2004 (aged 21)	11	0	(Scottish Football Association) Hibernian
6	DF	Benson Sakala	12 September 1996 (aged 29)	42	0	(Football Association of the Czech Republic) Bohemians 1905
7	FW	Jack Lahne	24 October 2001 (aged 24)	0	0	(Austrian Football Association) Austria Lustenau
8	MF	Lubambo Musonda	1 March 1995 (aged 30)	56	2	(German Football Association) 1. FC Magdeburg
9	FW	Lameck Banda	29 January 2001 (aged 24)	17	3	(Italian Football Federation) Lecce
10	FW	Fashion Sakala (captain)	14 March 1997 (aged 28)	32	9	(Saudi Arabian Football Federation) Al-Fayha
11	MF	Joseph Sabobo	17 December 2005 (aged 20)	7	0	(Israel Football Association) Hapoel Be'er Sheva
12	MF	Wilson Chisala	25 May 2002 (aged 23)	0	0	(Football Association of Zambia) Zanaco
13	DF	Stoppila Sunzu	22 June 1989 (aged 36)	96	6	(Chinese Football Association) Changchun Yatai
14	DF	Kabaso Chongo	11 February 1992 (aged 33)	50	1	(Football Association of Zambia) ZESCO United
15	MF	Given Kalusa	11 August 2008 (aged 17)	0	0	(Football Association of Zambia) MUZA
16	GK	Lawrence Mulenga	21 August 1998 (aged 27)	22	0	(Football Association of Zambia) Power Dynamos
17	MF	Kings Kangwa	6 April 1999 (aged 26)	39	7	(Israel Football Association) Hapoel Be'er Sheva
18	GK	Francis Mwansa	14 July 2002 (aged 23)	5	0	(Football Association of Zambia) Zanaco
19	FW	Kennedy Musonda	28 December 1994 (aged 30)	16	4	(Israel Football Association) Hapoel Ramat Gan
20	FW	Patson Daka	9 October 1998 (aged 27)	48	21	(The Football Association) Leicester City
21	DF	Dominic Chanda	26 February 1996 (aged 29)	31	1	(Football Association of Zambia) Power Dynamos
22	DF	David Hamansenya	24 June 2007 (aged 18)	0	0	(Royal Spanish Football Federation) Leganés
23	MF	Pascal Phiri	17 July 2005 (aged 20)	0	0	(Football Association of Zambia) ZESCO United
24	DF	Gift Mphande	19 November 2003 (aged 22)	10	0	(Football Association of Zambia) ZESCO United
25	MF	Owen Tembo	16 May 1995 (aged 30)	4	0	(Football Association of Zambia) Power Dynamos
26	MF	Joseph Liteta	22 February 2006 (aged 19)	0	0	(Italian Football Federation) Cagliari
27	FW	Elia Mandanji	20 November 2007 (aged 18)	0	0	(Football Association of Zambia) Zanaco
28	MF	David Simukonda	10 August 2005 (aged 20)	0	0	(Football Association of Zambia) ZESCO United

== Group B ==
=== Angola ===
Angola's squad of 28 players was announced on 3 December. Zini was ruled out of the tournament with an injury and replaced by Agostinho Calunga.

Head coach: (France) Patrice Beaumelle

No.	Pos.	Player	Date of birth (age)	Caps	Goals	Club
1	GK	Hugo Marques	15 January 1986 (aged 39)	23	0	(Angolan Football Federation) Petro de Luanda
2	DF	Núrio Fortuna	24 March 1995 (aged 30)	25	0	(Hellenic Football Federation) Volos
3	DF	Jonathan Buatu	27 September 1993 (aged 32)	59	2	(Portuguese Football Federation) Gil Vicente
4	DF	Clinton Mata	7 November 1992 (aged 33)	16	0	(French Football Federation) Lyon
5	DF	David Carmo	19 July 1999 (aged 26)	15	0	(Royal Spanish Football Federation) Real Oviedo
6	DF	Kialonda Gaspar	27 September 1997 (aged 28)	46	1	(Italian Football Federation) Lecce
7	FW	Felício Milson	12 October 1999 (aged 26)	31	5	(Football Association of Serbia) Red Star Belgrade
8	MF	Maestro	4 August 2003 (aged 22)	23	1	(Turkish Football Federation) Alanyaspor
9	FW	M'Bala Nzola	18 August 1996 (aged 29)	12	3	(Italian Football Federation) Pisa
10	FW	Gelson Dala	13 July 1996 (aged 29)	53	21	(Qatar Football Association) Al-Wakrah
11	FW	Ary Papel	3 March 1994 (aged 31)	55	9	(Libyan Football Federation) Al-Akhdar
12	GK	Antonio Dominique	25 July 1994 (aged 31)	19	0	(Swiss Football Association) Étoile Carouge
13	DF	Tó Carneiro	5 November 1995 (aged 30)	44	1	(Royal Moroccan Football Federation) AS FAR
14	FW	Manuel Benson	28 March 1997 (aged 28)	7	0	(Football Association of Wales) Swansea City
15	MF	Beni Mukendi	21 May 2002 (aged 23)	6	0	(Portuguese Football Federation) Vitória de Guimarães
16	MF	Fredy (captain)	27 March 1990 (aged 35)	66	4	(Turkish Football Federation) Bodrum
17	MF	Randy Nteka	6 December 1997 (aged 28)	13	2	(Royal Spanish Football Federation) Rayo Vallecano
18	FW	Zito Luvumbo	9 March 2002 (aged 23)	29	1	(Italian Football Federation) Cagliari
19	FW	Mabululu	1 June 1992 (aged 33)	42	14	(Libyan Football Federation) Al-Ahli Tripoli
20	MF	Manuel Keliano	6 January 2003 (aged 22)	21	2	(Russian Football Union) Akhmat Grozny
21	DF	Eddie Afonso	7 March 1994 (aged 31)	28	0	(Angolan Football Federation) Petro de Luanda
22	GK	Neblú	16 December 1993 (aged 32)	47	0	(Angolan Football Federation) 1° de Agosto
23	MF	Show	6 March 1999 (aged 26)	60	1	(Turkish Football Federation) Kocaelispor
24	MF	Mário Balbúrdia	19 August 1997 (aged 28)	14	0	(Turkish Football Federation) Boluspor
25	DF	Rui Modesto	7 October 1999 (aged 26)	6	0	(Italian Football Federation) Udinese
26	GK	Agostinho Calunga	10 July 1998 (aged 27)	0	0	(Angolan Football Federation) Wiliete
27	FW	Chico Banza	17 December 1998 (aged 27)	19	0	(Egyptian Football Association) Zamalek
28	DF	Pedro Bondo	16 November 2004 (aged 21)	16	1	(Portuguese Football Federation) Famalicão

=== Egypt ===
Egypt's squad of 28 players was announced on 2 December.

Head coach: Hossam Hassan

No.	Pos.	Player	Date of birth (age)	Caps	Goals	Club
1	GK	Ahmed El Shenawy	14 May 1991 (aged 34)	29	0	(Egyptian Football Association) Pyramids
2	DF	Khaled Sobhi	4 May 1995 (aged 30)	5	0	(Egyptian Football Association) Al Masry
3	DF	Mohamed Hany	25 January 1996 (aged 29)	31	0	(Egyptian Football Association) Al Ahly
4	DF	Hossam Abdelmaguid	30 April 2001 (aged 24)	5	0	(Egyptian Football Association) Zamalek
5	DF	Ramy Rabia	20 May 1993 (aged 32)	37	4	(United Arab Emirates Football Association) Al-Ain
6	DF	Yasser Ibrahim	10 February 1993 (aged 32)	6	0	(Egyptian Football Association) Al Ahly
7	FW	Trézéguet	1 October 1994 (aged 31)	86	22	(Egyptian Football Association) Al Ahly
8	MF	Emam Ashour	20 February 1998 (aged 27)	18	0	(Egyptian Football Association) Al Ahly
9	FW	Salah Mohsen	1 September 1998 (aged 27)	7	1	(Egyptian Football Association) Al Masry
10	FW	Mohamed Salah (captain)	15 June 1992 (aged 33)	109	63	(The Football Association) Liverpool
11	FW	Mostafa Mohamed	28 November 1997 (aged 28)	53	13	(French Football Federation) Nantes
12	DF	Mohamed Hamdy	15 March 1995 (aged 30)	32	1	(Egyptian Football Association) Pyramids
13	DF	Ahmed Fatouh	22 March 1998 (aged 27)	30	1	(Egyptian Football Association) Zamalek
14	MF	Hamdy Fathy	29 September 1994 (aged 31)	52	3	(Qatar Football Association) Al-Wakrah
15	MF	Mohamed Shehata	8 February 2001 (aged 24)	6	0	(Egyptian Football Association) Zamalek
16	GK	Mohamed Sobhy	15 July 1999 (aged 26)	6	0	(Egyptian Football Association) Zamalek
17	MF	Mohanad Lasheen	29 May 1996 (aged 29)	15	0	(Egyptian Football Association) Pyramids
18	FW	Mostafa Fathi	12 May 1994 (aged 31)	37	3	(Egyptian Football Association) Pyramids
19	MF	Marwan Attia	12 August 1998 (aged 27)	25	0	(Egyptian Football Association) Al Ahly
20	FW	Ibrahim Adel	23 April 2001 (aged 24)	17	3	(United Arab Emirates Football Association) Al-Jazira
21	FW	Osama Faisal	1 January 2001 (aged 24)	14	0	(Egyptian Football Association) National Bank of Egypt
22	FW	Omar Marmoush	7 February 1999 (aged 26)	40	8	(The Football Association) Manchester City
23	GK	Mohamed El Shenawy	18 December 1988 (aged 37)	68	0	(Egyptian Football Association) Al Ahly
24	DF	Ahmed Eid	2 January 2001 (aged 24)	4	0	(Egyptian Football Association) Al Masry
25	MF	Zizo	10 January 1996 (aged 29)	52	4	(Egyptian Football Association) Al Ahly
26	GK	Mostafa Shobeir	17 March 2000 (aged 25)	3	0	(Egyptian Football Association) Al Ahly
27	MF	Mahmoud Saber	30 July 2001 (aged 24)	9	0	(Egyptian Football Association) ZED
28	DF	Mohamed Ismail	1 August 1999 (aged 26)	0	0	(Egyptian Football Association) Zamalek

=== South Africa ===
South Africa's squad of 25 players was announced on 1 December. Stand-by players Shabalala, Rayners and Moloisane were included in the official squad list, but did not travel with the team to Morocco.

Head coach: (Belgium) Hugo Broos

No.	Pos.	Player	Date of birth (age)	Caps	Goals	Club
1	GK	Ronwen Williams (captain)	21 January 1992 (aged 33)	56	0	(South African Football Association) Mamelodi Sundowns
2	DF	Tylon Smith	9 May 2005 (aged 20)	1	0	(The Football Association) Queens Park Rangers
3	DF	Khulumani Ndamane	5 February 2004 (aged 21)	4	0	(South African Football Association) TS Galaxy
4	MF	Teboho Mokoena	24 January 1997 (aged 28)	45	9	(South African Football Association) Mamelodi Sundowns
5	MF	Thalente Mbatha	6 March 2000 (aged 25)	10	3	(South African Football Association) Orlando Pirates
6	DF	Aubrey Modiba	22 July 1995 (aged 30)	38	3	(South African Football Association) Mamelodi Sundowns
7	FW	Oswin Appollis	25 August 2001 (aged 24)	19	5	(South African Football Association) Orlando Pirates
8	FW	Tshepang Moremi	2 October 2000 (aged 25)	3	0	(South African Football Association) Orlando Pirates
9	FW	Lyle Foster	9 May 2000 (aged 25)	20	8	(The Football Association) Burnley
10	FW	Relebohile Mofokeng	23 October 2004 (aged 21)	8	0	(South African Football Association) Orlando Pirates
11	FW	Mohau Nkota	9 November 2004 (aged 21)	7	2	(Saudi Arabian Football Federation) Al-Ettifaq
12	FW	Elias Mokwana	8 September 1999 (aged 26)	9	2	(Saudi Arabian Football Federation) Al-Hazem
13	MF	Sphephelo Sithole	3 March 1999 (aged 26)	22	1	(Portuguese Football Federation) Tondela
14	DF	Mbekezeli Mbokazi	19 September 2005 (aged 20)	5	0	(South African Football Association) Orlando Pirates
15	MF	Bathusi Aubaas	11 July 1998 (aged 27)	13	1	(South African Football Association) Mamelodi Sundowns
16	GK	Sipho Chaine	14 December 1996 (aged 29)	3	0	(South African Football Association) Orlando Pirates
17	MF	Sipho Mbule	22 March 1998 (aged 27)	4	0	(South African Football Association) Orlando Pirates
18	DF	Samukele Kabini	15 March 2004 (aged 21)	3	0	(Norwegian Football Federation) Molde
19	DF	Nkosinathi Sibisi	22 September 1995 (aged 30)	18	0	(South African Football Association) Orlando Pirates
20	DF	Khuliso Mudau	26 April 1995 (aged 30)	26	1	(South African Football Association) Mamelodi Sundowns
21	DF	Siyabonga Ngezana	15 July 1997 (aged 28)	7	0	(Romanian Football Federation) FCSB
22	GK	Ricardo Goss	2 April 1994 (aged 31)	4	0	(South African Football Association) Siwelele
23	FW	Evidence Makgopa	5 June 2000 (aged 25)	21	5	(South African Football Association) Orlando Pirates
24	FW	Shandre Campbell	15 July 2005 (aged 20)	0	0	(Royal Belgian Football Association) Club Brugge
25	DF	Thabang Matuludi	14 January 1999 (aged 26)	1	0	(South African Football Association) Polokwane City
26	MF	Mduduzi Shabalala*	20 January 2004 (aged 21)	1	0	(South African Football Association) Kaizer Chiefs
27	FW	Iqraam Rayners*	19 December 1995 (aged 30)	13	4	(South African Football Association) Mamelodi Sundowns
28	DF	Thabo Moloisane*	24 February 1999 (aged 26)	2	0	(South African Football Association) Stellenbosch

=== Zimbabwe ===
Zimbabwe's 28 player squad was announced on 11 December.

Head coach: (Romania) Mario Marinică

No.	Pos.	Player	Date of birth (age)	Caps	Goals	Club
1	GK	Elvis Chipezeze	11 March 1990 (aged 35)	10	0	(South African Football Association) Magesi
2	DF	Gerald Takwara	29 October 1994 (aged 31)	27	0	(Libyan Football Federation) Al-Ittihad Misurata
3	DF	Sean Fusire	31 May 2005 (aged 20)	4	0	(The Football Association) Sheffield Wednesday
4	DF	Munashe Garananga	18 January 2001 (aged 24)	15	1	(Danish Football Association) Copenhagen
5	DF	Divine Lunga	28 May 1995 (aged 30)	26	0	(South African Football Association) Mamelodi Sundowns
6	MF	Prosper Padera	9 October 2006 (aged 19)	3	0	(Football Association of Finland) SJK
7	FW	Prince Dube	17 February 1997 (aged 28)	12	7	(Tanzania Football Federation) Young Africans
8	MF	Jonah Fabisch	13 August 2001 (aged 24)	6	0	(German Football Association) Erzgebirge Aue
9	FW	Macauley Bonne	26 October 1995 (aged 30)	3	1	(The Football Association) Maldon & Tiptree
10	MF	Andy Rinomhota	21 April 1997 (aged 28)	13	0	(The Football Association) Reading
11	FW	Washington Navaya	29 April 1998 (aged 27)	0	0	(Zimbabwe Football Association) TelOne
12	FW	Bill Antonio	3 September 2002 (aged 23)	9	1	(Royal Belgian Football Association) Mechelen
13	DF	Brendan Galloway	17 March 1996 (aged 29)	7	0	(The Football Association) Plymouth Argyle
14	FW	Daniel Msendami	24 October 2000 (aged 25)	11	0	(South African Football Association) Marumo Gallants
15	DF	Teenage Hadebe	17 September 1995 (aged 30)	34	4	(United States Soccer Federation) FC Cincinnati
16	GK	Martin Mapisa	25 May 1998 (aged 27)	2	0	(Zimbabwe Football Association) MWOS
17	MF	Knowledge Musona	21 June 1990 (aged 35)	53	26	(Zimbabwe Football Association) Scottland
18	MF	Marvelous Nakamba (captain)	19 January 1994 (aged 31)	33	0	(The Football Association) Luton Town
19	FW	Tawanda Maswanhise	20 November 2002 (aged 23)	15	1	(Scottish Football Association) Motherwell
20	MF	Tawanda Chirewa	11 October 2003 (aged 22)	11	3	(The Football Association) Wolverhampton Wanderers
21	DF	Godknows Murwira	4 July 1993 (aged 32)	15	0	(Zimbabwe Football Association) Scottland
22	GK	Washington Arubi	29 August 1985 (aged 40)	30	0	(South African Football Association) Marumo Gallants
23	DF	Emmanuel Jalai	6 January 1999 (aged 26)	10	0	(Zimbabwe Football Association) Dynamos
24	DF	Isheanesu Mauchi	28 November 2002 (aged 23)	1	0	(Zimbabwe Football Association) Simba Bhora
25	DF	Alec Mudimu	8 April 1995 (aged 30)	26	0	(Football Association of Wales) Flint Town United
26	FW	Ishmael Wadi	19 December 1992 (aged 33)	6	0	(Zimbabwe Football Association) CAPS United
27	FW	Junior Zindoga	28 July 1998 (aged 27)	0	0	(South African Football Association) TS Galaxy
28	MF	Tadiwa Chakuchichi	1 June 2009 (aged 16)	0	0	(Zimbabwe Football Association) Scottland

== Group C ==
=== Nigeria ===
Nigeria's 28 player squad was announced on 11 December.

Head coach: (Mali) Éric Chelle

No.	Pos.	Player	Date of birth (age)	Caps	Goals	Club
1	GK	Francis Uzoho	28 October 1998 (aged 27)	35	0	(Cyprus Football Association) Omonia
2	DF	Bright Osayi-Samuel	31 December 1997 (aged 27)	25	0	(The Football Association) Birmingham City
3	DF	Zaidu Sanusi	13 June 1997 (aged 28)	26	0	(Portuguese Football Federation) Porto
4	MF	Wilfred Ndidi (captain)	16 December 1996 (aged 29)	71	0	(Turkish Football Federation) Beşiktaş
5	DF	Igoh Ogbu	8 February 2000 (aged 25)	3	0	(Football Association of the Czech Republic) Slavia Prague
6	DF	Semi Ajayi	9 November 1993 (aged 32)	46	1	(The Football Association) Hull City
7	FW	Ademola Lookman	20 October 1997 (aged 28)	34	8	(Italian Football Federation) Atalanta
8	MF	Frank Onyeka	1 January 1998 (aged 27)	36	3	(The Football Association) Brentford
9	FW	Victor Osimhen	29 December 1998 (aged 26)	45	31	(Turkish Football Federation) Galatasaray
10	MF	Fisayo Dele-Bashiru	6 February 2001 (aged 24)	9	2	(Italian Football Federation) Lazio
11	FW	Samuel Chukwueze	22 May 1999 (aged 26)	51	7	(The Football Association) Fulham
12	FW	Cyriel Dessers	8 December 1994 (aged 31)	10	3	(Hellenic Football Federation) Panathinaikos
13	DF	Bruno Onyemaechi	3 April 1999 (aged 26)	20	0	(Hellenic Football Federation) Olympiacos
14	MF	Muhammed Usman Edu	2 March 1994 (aged 31)	0	0	(Israel Football Association) Ironi Tiberias
15	FW	Moses Simon	12 July 1995 (aged 30)	87	10	(French Football Federation) Paris FC
16	GK	Amas Obasogie	27 December 1999 (aged 25)	0	0	(Tanzania Football Federation) Singida Black Stars
17	MF	Alex Iwobi	3 May 1996 (aged 29)	91	10	(The Football Association) Fulham
18	MF	Raphael Onyedika	19 April 2001 (aged 24)	17	1	(Royal Belgian Football Association) Club Brugge
19	FW	Paul Onuachu	28 May 1994 (aged 31)	24	3	(Turkish Football Federation) Trabzonspor
20	DF	Chidozie Awaziem	1 January 1997 (aged 28)	36	1	(French Football Federation) Nantes
21	DF	Calvin Bassey	31 December 1999 (aged 25)	37	1	(The Football Association) Fulham
22	FW	Akor Adams	29 January 2000 (aged 25)	4	2	(Royal Spanish Football Federation) Sevilla
23	GK	Stanley Nwabali	10 June 1996 (aged 29)	27	0	(South African Football Association) Chippa United
24	FW	Chidera Ejuke	2 January 1998 (aged 27)	10	1	(Royal Spanish Football Federation) Sevilla
25	FW	Salim Fago Lawal	15 January 2003 (aged 22)	0	0	(Croatian Football Federation) Istra 1961
26	MF	Ebenezer Akinsanmiro	25 November 2004 (aged 21)	0	0	(Italian Football Federation) Pisa
27	DF	Ryan Alebiosu	17 December 2001 (aged 24)	0	0	(The Football Association) Blackburn Rovers
28	MF	Tochukwu Nnadi	30 June 2003 (aged 22)	0	0	(Royal Belgian Football Association) Zulte Waregem

=== Tanzania ===
Tanzania's 28 player squad was announced on 9 December.

Head coach: (Argentina) Miguel Gamondi

No.	Pos.	Player	Date of birth (age)	Caps	Goals	Club
1	GK	Hussein Masalanga	4 March 1992 (aged 33)	1	0	(Tanzania Football Federation) Singida Black Stars
2	DF	Pascal Msindo	15 August 2003 (aged 22)	17	0	(Tanzania Football Federation) Azam
3	DF	Nickson Kibabage	12 October 2000 (aged 25)	15	0	(Tanzania Football Federation) Simba
4	DF	Ibrahim Hamad	12 November 1997 (aged 28)	33	1	(Tanzania Football Federation) Young Africans
5	DF	Dickson Job	29 December 2000 (aged 24)	39	1	(Tanzania Football Federation) Young Africans
6	MF	Feisal Salum	11 January 1998 (aged 27)	57	4	(Tanzania Football Federation) Azam
7	FW	Iddy Nado	3 November 1995 (aged 30)	22	1	(Tanzania Football Federation) Azam
8	MF	Charles M'Mombwa	14 March 1998 (aged 27)	14	3	(Malta Football Association) Floriana
9	FW	Selemani Mwalimu	19 January 2006 (aged 19)	5	1	(Tanzania Football Federation) Simba
10	FW	Mbwana Samatta (captain)	23 December 1992 (aged 32)	85	22	(French Football Federation) Le Havre
11	FW	Kibu Denis	4 December 2000 (aged 25)	26	0	(Tanzania Football Federation) Simba
12	FW	Simon Msuva	2 October 1993 (aged 32)	99	24	(Iraq Football Association) Al-Talaba
13	GK	Yakoub Suleiman Ali	7 December 1999 (aged 26)	12	0	(Tanzania Football Federation) Simba
14	DF	Bakari Mwamnyeto	5 October 1995 (aged 30)	48	0	(Tanzania Football Federation) Young Africans
15	DF	Mohamed Husseini	1 November 1996 (aged 29)	59	1	(Tanzania Football Federation) Young Africans
16	DF	Wilson Nangu	30 September 2001 (aged 24)	2	0	(Tanzania Football Federation) Simba
17	MF	Khalid Habibu Iddi	10 September 2001 (aged 24)	4	0	(Tanzania Football Federation) Singida Black Stars
18	MF	Morice Abraham	13 August 2003 (aged 22)	13	0	(Tanzania Football Federation) Simba
19	DF	Lusajo Mwaikenda	27 October 2000 (aged 25)	24	0	(Tanzania Football Federation) Azam
20	DF	Novatus Miroshi	2 September 2002 (aged 23)	31	3	(Turkish Football Federation) Göztepe
21	FW	Kelvin John	10 June 2003 (aged 22)	10	1	(Danish Football Association) AaB
22	DF	Shomari Kapombe	28 January 1992 (aged 33)	92	2	(Tanzania Football Federation) Simba
23	MF	Yusuph Kagoma	1 February 1996 (aged 29)	9	0	(Tanzania Football Federation) Simba
24	MF	Kelvin Nashon	2 August 2000 (aged 25)	1	0	(Tanzania Football Federation) Pamba
25	MF	Haji Mnoga	16 April 2002 (aged 23)	14	0	(The Football Association) Salford City
26	MF	Tarryn Allarakhia	17 November 1997 (aged 28)	8	1	(The Football Association) Rochdale
27	MF	Alphonce Msanga	14 June 2003 (aged 22)	4	0	(Association of Football Federations of Azerbaijan) Şamaxı
28	GK	Zuberi Foba	23 May 2002 (aged 23)	0	0	(Tanzania Football Federation) Azam

=== Tunisia ===
Tunisia's 28 player squad was announced on 11 December.

Head coach: Sami Trabelsi

No.	Pos.	Player	Date of birth (age)	Caps	Goals	Club
1	GK	Noureddine Farhati	14 September 2000 (aged 25)	1	0	(Tunisian Football Federation) Stade Tunisien
2	DF	Ali Abdi	20 December 1993 (aged 32)	40	6	(French Football Federation) Nice
3	DF	Montassar Talbi	26 May 1998 (aged 27)	57	3	(French Football Federation) Lorient
4	DF	Yassine Meriah	2 July 1993 (aged 32)	93	6	(Tunisian Football Federation) Espérance de Tunis
5	MF	Mohamed Ali Ben Romdhane	6 September 1999 (aged 26)	54	7	(Egyptian Football Association) Al Ahly
6	DF	Dylan Bronn	19 June 1995 (aged 30)	47	2	(Swiss Football Association) Servette
7	FW	Elias Achouri	10 February 1999 (aged 26)	24	2	(Danish Football Association) Copenhagen
8	FW	Elias Saad	27 December 1999 (aged 25)	9	4	(German Football Association) FC Augsburg
9	FW	Hazem Mastouri	18 June 1997 (aged 28)	12	4	(Russian Football Union) Dynamo Makhachkala
10	MF	Hannibal Mejbri	21 January 2003 (aged 22)	39	1	(The Football Association) Burnley
11	MF	Ismaël Gharbi	10 April 2004 (aged 21)	8	1	(German Football Association) FC Augsburg
12	DF	Ali Maâloul	1 January 1990 (aged 35)	94	3	(Tunisian Football Federation) CS Sfaxien
13	MF	Ferjani Sassi (captain)	18 March 1992 (aged 33)	97	9	(Qatar Football Association) Al-Gharafa
14	DF	Mohamed Ben Ali	16 February 1995 (aged 30)	3	1	(Tunisian Football Federation) Espérance de Tunis
15	MF	Mohamed Belhadj Mahmoud	24 April 2000 (aged 25)	2	0	(Swiss Football Association) Lugano
16	GK	Aymen Dahmen	28 January 1997 (aged 28)	32	0	(Tunisian Football Federation) CS Sfaxien
17	MF	Ellyes Skhiri	10 May 1995 (aged 30)	74	3	(German Football Association) Eintracht Frankfurt
18	DF	Nader Ghandri	18 February 1995 (aged 30)	19	0	(Russian Football Union) Akhmat Grozny
19	FW	Firas Chaouat	8 May 1996 (aged 29)	24	5	(Tunisian Football Federation) Club Africain
20	DF	Yan Valery	22 February 1999 (aged 26)	16	0	(The Football Association) Sheffield Wednesday
21	DF	Mortadha Ben Ouanes	2 July 1994 (aged 31)	15	0	(Turkish Football Federation) Kasımpaşa
22	GK	Bechir Ben Saïd	29 November 1994 (aged 31)	21	0	(Tunisian Football Federation) Espérance de Tunis
23	FW	Naïm Sliti	27 July 1992 (aged 33)	83	14	(Qatar Football Association) Al-Shamal
24	DF	Adem Arous	17 July 2004 (aged 21)	0	0	(Turkish Football Federation) Kasımpaşa
25	MF	Houssem Tka	16 August 2000 (aged 25)	4	0	(Tunisian Football Federation) Espérance de Tunis
26	FW	Sebastian Tounekti	13 July 2002 (aged 23)	4	0	(Scottish Football Association) Celtic
27	FW	Seifeddine Jaziri	11 February 1993 (aged 32)	43	11	(Egyptian Football Association) Zamalek
28	GK	Sabri Ben Hessen	13 June 1996 (aged 29)	0	0	(Tunisian Football Federation) Étoile du Sahel

=== Uganda ===
Uganda announced a 30 player provisional squad on 7 December. Charles Lukwago and David Owori were left out of the final 28-man squad.

Head coach: (Belgium) Paul Put

No.	Pos.	Player	Date of birth (age)	Caps	Goals	Club
1	GK	Nafian Alionzi	1 March 1996 (aged 29)	7	0	(Ethiopian Football Federation) Defence Force
2	DF	Rogers Torach	23 June 2003 (aged 22)	6	1	(Federation of Uganda Football Associations) Vipers
3	DF	Timothy Awany	6 August 1996 (aged 29)	40	0	(Israel Football Association) Ashdod
4	MF	Kenneth Semakula	14 November 2002 (aged 23)	32	0	(Saudi Arabian Football Federation) Al-Adalah
5	DF	Toby Sibbick	23 May 1999 (aged 26)	6	0	(The Football Association) Burton Albion
6	MF	Bobosi Byaruhanga	3 December 2001 (aged 24)	25	0	(United States Soccer Federation) Oakland Roots
7	FW	Rogers Mato	20 October 1998 (aged 27)	36	6	(Football Federation of Macedonia) Vardar
8	MF	Khalid Aucho (captain)	8 August 1993 (aged 32)	72	2	(Tanzania Football Federation) Singida Black Stars
9	FW	Uche Ikpeazu	28 February 1995 (aged 30)	4	0	(Scottish Football Association) St Johnstone
10	MF	Travis Mutyaba	7 August 2005 (aged 20)	26	2	(Tunisian Football Federation) CS Sfaxien
11	FW	Steven Mukwala	15 July 1999 (aged 26)	26	2	(Tanzania Football Federation) Simba
12	MF	Baba Alhassan	3 January 2000 (aged 25)	1	0	(Romanian Football Federation) FCSB
13	DF	Elio Capradossi	11 March 1996 (aged 29)	11	1	(Romanian Football Federation) Universitatea Cluj
14	FW	Denis Omedi	13 June 1996 (aged 29)	17	3	(Rwanda Football Federation) APR
15	DF	Jordan Obita	8 December 1993 (aged 32)	7	0	(Scottish Football Association) Hibernian
16	MF	Ronald Ssekiganda	13 September 1995 (aged 30)	11	1	(Rwanda Football Federation) APR
17	FW	Reagan Mpande	7 May 2000 (aged 25)	7	1	(Federation of Uganda Football Associations) Villa
18	GK	Denis Onyango	15 May 1985 (aged 40)	82	0	(South African Football Association) Mamelodi Sundowns
19	GK	Jamal Salim	27 May 1995 (aged 30)	15	0	(South African Football Association) Richards Bay
20	DF	Isaac Muleme	10 October 1992 (aged 33)	49	0	(Football Association of the Czech Republic) Viktoria Žižkov
21	MF	Allan Okello	4 July 2000 (aged 25)	32	6	(Federation of Uganda Football Associations) Vipers
22	FW	Jude Ssemugabi	3 March 1997 (aged 28)	15	4	(South Sudan Football Association) Jamus
23	DF	Aziz Kayondo	6 October 2002 (aged 23)	33	2	(Football Association of the Czech Republic) Slovan Liberec
24	FW	James Bogere	2 February 2008 (aged 17)	0	0	(Federation of Uganda Football Associations) Masaka Sunshine
25	FW	Shafik Nana Kwikiriza	3 March 2004 (aged 21)	1	0	(Federation of Uganda Football Associations) KCCA
26	DF	Hilary Mukundane	22 December 1997 (aged 27)	8	0	(Federation of Uganda Football Associations) Vipers
27	FW	Melvyn Lorenzen	26 November 1994 (aged 31)	2	0	(Football Association of Thailand) Muangthong United
28	FW	Ivan Ahimbisibwe	23 November 1995 (aged 30)	4	1	(Federation of Uganda Football Associations) KCCA

== Group D ==
=== Benin ===
Benin announced a list of 30 player-provisional squad on 3 December.

Head coach: (Germany) Gernot Rohr

No.	Pos.	Player	Date of birth (age)	Caps	Goals	Club
1	GK	Marcel Dandjinou	25 June 1998 (aged 27)	19	0	(South African Football Association) Kruger United
2	MF	Rodrigue Fassinou	22 May 1999 (aged 26)	17	0	(Benin Football Federation) Coton
3	DF	Tamimou Ouorou	3 May 2003 (aged 22)	9	0	(Benin Football Federation) Sobemap
4	MF	Attidjikou Samadou	2 February 2004 (aged 21)	8	0	(Egyptian Football Association) Smouha
5	DF	Yohan Roche	7 July 1997 (aged 28)	22	1	(Romanian Football Federation) Petrolul Ploiești
6	DF	Olivier Verdon	5 October 1995 (aged 30)	42	0	(Bulgarian Football Union) Ludogorets Razgrad
7	MF	Mattéo Ahlinvi	2 July 1999 (aged 26)	24	0	(Russian Football Union) Arsenal Tula
8	MF	Hassane Imourane	8 April 2003 (aged 22)	24	2	(Swiss Football Association) Grasshopper
9	FW	Steve Mounié (captain)	29 September 1994 (aged 31)	66	22	(Turkish Football Federation) Alanyaspor
10	FW	Aiyegun Tosin	26 June 1998 (aged 27)	20	4	(French Football Federation) Lorient
11	DF	Rachid Moumini	27 October 2004 (aged 21)	21	1	(Association of Football Federations of Azerbaijan) Sumgayit
12	DF	David Kiki	25 November 1993 (aged 32)	54	0	(Romanian Football Federation) FCSB
13	DF	Mohamed Tijani	10 July 1997 (aged 28)	22	1	(Swiss Football Association) Yverdon-Sport
14	MF	Mariano Ahouangbo	16 November 2002 (aged 23)	3	0	(Football Association of Slovenia) Olimpija Ljubljana
15	MF	Sessi D'Almeida	20 November 1995 (aged 30)	45	1	(Association of Football Federations of Azerbaijan) Neftçi
16	GK	Saturnin Allagbé	22 November 1993 (aged 32)	45	0	(French Football Federation) Chauray
17	MF	Rodolfo Aloko	26 December 2006 (aged 18)	3	0	(Croatian Football Federation) Kustošija
18	MF	Junior Olaitan	9 May 2002 (aged 23)	36	5	(Turkish Football Federation) Göztepe
19	MF	Dodo Dokou	4 May 2004 (aged 21)	22	2	(Portuguese Football Federation) Leixões
20	MF	Jodel Dossou	17 March 1992 (aged 33)	72	9	(French Football Federation) Pays du Valois
21	MF	Rodrigue Kossi	31 December 1999 (aged 25)	13	1	(Royal Moroccan Football Federation) Hassania Agadir
22	MF	Romaric Amoussou	10 December 2000 (aged 25)	5	0	(Ivorian Football Federation) ASEC Mimosas
23	GK	Serge Obassa	30 June 1996 (aged 29)	2	0	(Nigeria Football Federation) Remo Stars
24	MF	Razack Rachidou	22 June 2006 (aged 19)	6	0	(Croatian Football Federation) Kustošija
25	MF	Olatoundji Tessilimi	18 February 1998 (aged 27)	4	0	(Football Association of Finland) SJK
26	DF	Charlemagne Azongnitode	8 August 2001 (aged 24)	0	0	(Football Association of Finland) Oulu
27	MF	Gislain Ahoudo	2 July 1999 (aged 26)	4	0	(Tunisian Football Federation) AS Gabès
28	FW	Adam Akimey	25 February 2004 (aged 21)	0	0	(Swedish Football Association) Helsingborg

=== Botswana ===
Head coach: (South Africa) Morena Ramoreboli

No.	Pos.	Player	Date of birth (age)	Caps	Goals	Club
1	GK	Kabelo Dambe	10 May 1990 (aged 35)			(Botswana Football Association) Township Rollers
2	DF	Thabo Leinanyane	27 July 1993 (aged 32)			(Botswana Football Association) Jwaneng Galaxy
3	DF	Thatayaone Ditlhokwe (captain)	21 September 1998 (aged 27)			(Libyan Football Federation) Al-Ittihad Tripoli
4	DF	Mosha Gaolaolwe	25 December 1993 (aged 31)			(Botswana Football Association) Township Rollers
5	DF	Alford Velaphi	18 January 1999 (aged 26)			(Botswana Football Association) Gaborone United
6	MF	Gape Mohutsiwa	20 March 1997 (aged 28)			(Algerian Football Federation) MC Oran
7	FW	Kabelo Seakanyeng	25 June 1993 (aged 32)			(Royal Moroccan Football Federation) Maghreb Fez
8	MF	Olebogeng Ramotse	17 January 1998 (aged 27)			(Botswana Football Association) Jwaneng Galaxy
9	FW	Omaatla Kebatho	16 June 1993 (aged 32)			(Botswana Football Association) Jwaneng Galaxy
10	FW	Thabang Sesinyi	15 October 1992 (aged 33)			(Botswana Football Association) Jwaneng Galaxy
11	FW	Tumisang Orebonye	26 March 1996 (aged 29)			(Royal Moroccan Football Federation) Wydad AC
12	DF	Mothusi Johnson	28 July 1997 (aged 28)			(Botswana Football Association) Gaborone United
13	MF	Segolame Boy	7 November 1992 (aged 33)			(Botswana Football Association) Sua Flamingoes
14	MF	Godarione Modingwane	25 June 1996 (aged 29)			(Botswana Football Association) Botswana Defence Force
15	MF	Mothusi Cooper	19 July 1997 (aged 28)			(Botswana Football Association) Township Rollers
16	GK	Keagile Kgosipula	2 January 1996 (aged 29)			(Botswana Football Association) Mochudi Centre Chiefs
17	FW	Thatayaone Kgamanyane	30 January 1996 (aged 29)			(Botswana Football Association) Gaborone United
18	MF	Lebogang Ditsele	20 April 1996 (aged 29)			(Botswana Football Association) Gaborone United
19	DF	Chicco Molefe	29 July 1995 (aged 30)			(Botswana Football Association) Jwaneng Galaxy
20	DF	Tebogo Kopelang	24 April 2002 (aged 23)			(Botswana Football Association) Jwaneng Galaxy
21	FW	Thabo Maponda	17 July 1997 (aged 28)			(Botswana Football Association) Gaborone United
22	MF	Gilbert Baruti	16 March 1992 (aged 33)			(Botswana Football Association) Mochudi Centre Chiefs
23	GK	Goitseone Phoko	13 December 1994 (aged 31)			(Botswana Football Association) Jwaneng Galaxy
24	FW	Losika Ratshkudu	1 February 2006 (aged 19)			(South African Football Association) Ubuntu
25	MF	Monty Enosa	6 February 2004 (aged 21)			(Botswana Football Association) Mochudi Centre Chiefs
26	DF	Shanganani Ngada	16 March 1994 (aged 31)			(Botswana Football Association) Mochudi Centre Chiefs

=== DR Congo ===
DR Congo's 26 player squad was announced on 1 December. Mario Stroeykens was ruled out of the tournament with an injury and replaced by Gaël Kakuta.

Head coach: (France) Sébastien Desabre

No.	Pos.	Player	Date of birth (age)	Caps	Goals	Club
1	GK	Lionel Mpasi	1 August 1994 (aged 31)	21	0	(French Football Federation) Le Havre
2	DF	Aaron Wan-Bissaka	26 November 1997 (aged 28)	6	0	(The Football Association) West Ham United
3	DF	Steve Kapuadi	30 April 1998 (aged 27)	1	0	(Polish Football Association) Legia Warsaw
4	DF	Axel Tuanzebe	14 November 1997 (aged 28)	7	0	(The Football Association) Burnley
5	DF	Dylan Batubinsika	15 February 1996 (aged 29)	14	1	(French Football Federation) Saint-Étienne
6	MF	Ngal'ayel Mukau	3 November 2004 (aged 21)	6	0	(French Football Federation) Lille
7	FW	Nathanaël Mbuku	16 March 2002 (aged 23)	11	1	(French Football Federation) Montpellier
8	MF	Samuel Moutoussamy	12 August 1996 (aged 29)	52	0	(Hellenic Football Federation) Atromitos
9	FW	Samuel Essende	30 January 1998 (aged 27)	9	1	(German Football Association) FC Augsburg
10	MF	Théo Bongonda	20 November 1995 (aged 30)	31	6	(Russian Football Union) Spartak Moscow
11	FW	Gaël Kakuta	21 June 1991 (aged 34)	28	3	(Turkish Football Federation) Sakaryaspor
12	DF	Joris Kayembe	8 August 1994 (aged 31)	19	0	(Royal Belgian Football Association) Genk
13	FW	Meschak Elia	6 August 1997 (aged 28)	60	12	(Turkish Football Federation) Alanyaspor
14	MF	Noah Sadiki	17 December 2004 (aged 21)	13	0	(The Football Association) Sunderland
15	DF	Rocky Bushiri	30 November 1999 (aged 26)	5	0	(Scottish Football Association) Hibernian
16	GK	Timothy Fayulu	24 July 1999 (aged 26)	2	0	(Football Federation of Armenia) Noah
17	FW	Cédric Bakambu	11 April 1991 (aged 34)	63	20	(Royal Spanish Football Federation) Real Betis
18	MF	Charles Pickel	15 May 1997 (aged 28)	29	1	(Royal Spanish Football Federation) Espanyol
19	FW	Fiston Mayele	24 June 1994 (aged 31)	32	5	(Egyptian Football Association) Pyramids
20	FW	Brian Cipenga	11 March 1998 (aged 27)	3	0	(Royal Spanish Football Federation) Castellón
21	GK	Matthieu Epolo	15 January 2005 (aged 20)	0	0	(Royal Belgian Football Association) Standard Liège
22	DF	Chancel Mbemba (captain)	8 August 1994 (aged 31)	102	7	(French Football Federation) Lille
23	FW	Simon Banza	13 August 1996 (aged 29)	14	2	(United Arab Emirates Football Association) Al-Jazira
24	DF	Gédéon Kalulu	29 August 1997 (aged 28)	25	0	(Cyprus Football Association) Aris Limassol
25	MF	Edo Kayembe	3 June 1998 (aged 27)	35	2	(The Football Association) Watford
26	DF	Arthur Masuaku	7 November 1993 (aged 32)	40	3	(The Football Association) Sunderland
27	FW	Michel-Ange Balikwisha	10 May 2001 (aged 24)	1	0	(Scottish Football Association) Celtic
28	GK	Dimitry Bertaud	6 June 1998 (aged 27)	14	0	Unattached

=== Senegal ===
Senegal announced the final squad on 14 December. Later, both Ilay Camara and Assane Diao withdrew injured, replaced by Mamadou Camara and Ousseynou Niang.

Head coach: Pape Thiaw

No.	Pos.	Player	Date of birth (age)	Caps	Goals	Club
1	GK	Yehvann Diouf	16 November 1999 (aged 26)	1	0	(French Football Federation) Nice
2	DF	Mamadou Sarr	29 August 2005 (aged 20)	1	0	(French Football Federation) Strasbourg
3	DF	Kalidou Koulibaly (captain)	20 June 1991 (aged 34)	98	2	(Saudi Arabian Football Federation) Al-Hilal
4	DF	Abdoulaye Seck	4 June 1992 (aged 33)	17	2	(Israel Football Association) Maccabi Haifa
5	MF	Idrissa Gueye	26 September 1989 (aged 36)	121	7	(The Football Association) Everton
6	MF	Pathé Ciss	16 March 1994 (aged 31)	23	0	(Royal Spanish Football Federation) Rayo Vallecano
7	MF	Habib Diarra	3 January 2004 (aged 21)	13	4	(The Football Association) Sunderland
8	MF	Lamine Camara	5 January 2004 (aged 21)	24	6	(French Football Federation) Monaco (Note: Monaco is a Monégasque club playing in the French football league system.)
9	FW	Boulaye Dia	16 November 1996 (aged 29)	36	6	(Italian Football Federation) Lazio
10	FW	Sadio Mané	10 April 1992 (aged 33)	117	50	(Saudi Arabian Football Federation) Al-Nassr
11	FW	Nicolas Jackson	20 June 2001 (aged 24)	26	5	(German Football Association) Bayern Munich
12	FW	Cherif Ndiaye	23 January 1996 (aged 29)	10	2	(Turkish Football Federation) Samsunspor
13	FW	Iliman Ndiaye	6 March 2000 (aged 25)	32	3	(The Football Association) Everton
14	DF	Ismail Jakobs	17 August 1999 (aged 26)	23	0	(Turkish Football Federation) Galatasaray
15	DF	Krépin Diatta	25 February 1999 (aged 26)	49	2	(French Football Federation) Monaco
16	GK	Édouard Mendy	1 March 1992 (aged 33)	50	0	(Saudi Arabian Football Federation) Al-Ahli
17	MF	Pape Matar Sarr	14 September 2002 (aged 23)	36	4	(The Football Association) Tottenham Hotspur
18	FW	Ismaïla Sarr	25 February 1998 (aged 27)	75	18	(The Football Association) Crystal Palace
19	DF	Moussa Niakhaté	8 March 1996 (aged 29)	22	0	(French Football Federation) Lyon
20	FW	Habib Diallo	18 June 1995 (aged 30)	36	8	(French Football Federation) Metz
21	FW	Cheikh Sabaly	4 March 1999 (aged 26)	10	1	(French Football Federation) Metz
22	MF	Ousseynou Niang	12 October 2001 (aged 24)	0	0	(Royal Belgian Football Association) Union Saint-Gilloise
23	GK	Mory Diaw	22 June 1993 (aged 32)	3	0	(French Football Federation) Le Havre
24	DF	Antoine Mendy	27 May 2004 (aged 21)	4	0	(French Football Federation) Nice
25	DF	El Hadji Malick Diouf	28 December 2004 (aged 20)	12	1	(The Football Association) West Ham United
26	MF	Pape Gueye	24 January 1999 (aged 26)	33	3	(Royal Spanish Football Federation) Villarreal
27	FW	Ibrahim Mbaye	24 January 2008 (aged 17)	2	1	(French Football Federation) Paris Saint-Germain
28	MF	Mamadou Camara	5 January 2003 (aged 22)	5	1	(Royal Moroccan Football Federation) RS Berkane

== Group E ==
=== Algeria ===
The 28-player squad of Algeria was announced on 13 December. On 19 December, Houssem Aouar withdrew from the tournament due to injury, and was replaced by Himad Abdelli.

Head coach: (Bosnia and Herzegovina) Vladimir Petković

No.	Pos.	Player	Date of birth (age)	Caps	Goals	Club
1	GK	Anthony Mandrea	25 December 1996 (aged 28)	20	0	(French Football Federation) Caen
2	DF	Aïssa Mandi	22 October 1991 (aged 34)	109	7	(French Football Federation) Lille
3	DF	Mehdi Dorval	9 February 2001 (aged 24)	2	0	(Italian Football Federation) Bari
4	DF	Mohamed Amine Tougai	22 January 2000 (aged 25)	28	2	(Tunisian Football Federation) Espérance de Tunis
5	DF	Zineddine Belaïd	20 March 1999 (aged 26)	4	0	(Algerian Football Federation) JS Kabylie
6	MF	Ramiz Zerrouki	26 May 1998 (aged 27)	44	3	(Royal Dutch Football Association) Twente
7	MF	Riyad Mahrez (captain)	21 February 1991 (aged 34)	106	33	(Saudi Arabian Football Federation) Al-Ahli
8	MF	Himad Abdelli	17 November 1999 (aged 26)	4	0	(French Football Federation) Angers
9	FW	Baghdad Bounedjah	24 November 1991 (aged 34)	81	35	(Qatar Football Association) Al-Shamal
10	MF	Ismaël Bennacer	1 December 1997 (aged 28)	52	3	(Croatian Football Federation) Dinamo Zagreb
11	FW	Anis Hadj Moussa	11 February 2002 (aged 23)	8	0	(Royal Dutch Football Association) Feyenoord
12	FW	Monsef Bakrar	13 January 2001 (aged 24)	5	0	(Croatian Football Federation) Dinamo Zagreb
13	DF	Jaouen Hadjam	26 March 2003 (aged 22)	13	3	(Swiss Football Association) Young Boys
14	MF	Hicham Boudaoui	23 September 1999 (aged 26)	27	0	(French Football Federation) Nice
15	DF	Rayan Aït-Nouri	6 June 2001 (aged 24)	20	0	(The Football Association) Manchester City
16	GK	Oussama Benbot	11 October 1994 (aged 31)	2	0	(Algerian Football Federation) USM Alger
17	MF	Farès Chaïbi	28 November 2002 (aged 23)	21	2	(German Football Association) Eintracht Frankfurt
18	FW	Mohamed Amoura	9 May 2000 (aged 25)	38	19	(German Football Association) VfL Wolfsburg
19	MF	Adem Zorgane	6 January 2000 (aged 25)	23	1	(Royal Belgian Football Association) Union Saint-Gilloise
20	DF	Youcef Atal	17 May 1996 (aged 29)	53	2	(Qatar Football Association) Al-Sadd
21	DF	Ramy Bensebaini	16 April 1995 (aged 30)	75	7	(German Football Association) Borussia Dortmund
22	MF	Ibrahim Maza	24 November 2005 (aged 20)	7	0	(German Football Association) Bayer Leverkusen
23	GK	Luca Zidane	13 May 1998 (aged 27)	1	0	(Royal Spanish Football Federation) Granada
24	MF	Ilan Kebbal	10 July 1998 (aged 27)	2	0	(French Football Federation) Paris FC
25	DF	Rafik Belghali	7 June 2002 (aged 23)	3	0	(Italian Football Federation) Hellas Verona
26	DF	Samir Chergui	6 February 1999 (aged 26)	2	0	(French Football Federation) Paris FC
27	MF	Adil Boulbina	2 May 2003 (aged 22)	6	5	(Qatar Football Association) Al-Duhail
28	FW	Redouane Berkane	7 July 2003 (aged 22)	6	2	(Qatar Football Association) Al-Wakrah

=== Burkina Faso ===
Burkina Faso's 25 player squad was announced on 8 December. Konaté, Tiendrébéogo and Yoda were included in the official squad list as reserve players.

Head coach: Brama Traoré

No.	Pos.	Player	Date of birth (age)	Caps	Goals	Club
1	GK	Farid Ouédraogo	26 December 1996 (aged 28)	10	0	(Sudan Football Association) Al Hilal
2	FW	Lassina Traoré	12 January 2001 (aged 24)	29	12	(Ukrainian Association of Football) Shakhtar Donetsk
3	DF	Abdoul Ayinde	17 July 2005 (aged 20)	3	0	(Royal Belgian Football Association) Gent
4	DF	Adamo Nagalo	22 September 2002 (aged 23)	19	0	(Royal Dutch Football Association) PSV Eindhoven
5	DF	Nasser Djiga	15 November 2002 (aged 23)	11	1	(Scottish Football Association) Rangers
6	MF	Mohamed Zougrana	29 October 2001 (aged 24)	4	2	(Algerian Football Federation) MC Alger
7	FW	Dango Ouattara	11 February 2002 (aged 23)	35	12	(The Football Association) Brentford
8	MF	Cedric Badolo	4 November 1998 (aged 27)	30	0	(Slovak Football Association) Spartak Trnava
9	DF	Issa Kaboré	12 May 2001 (aged 24)	53	2	(Football Association of Wales) Wrexham
10	FW	Bertrand Traoré (captain)	6 September 1995 (aged 30)	85	21	(The Football Association) Sunderland
11	FW	Ousseni Bouda	28 April 2000 (aged 25)	11	2	(United States Soccer Federation) San Jose Earthquakes
12	DF	Edmond Tapsoba	2 February 1999 (aged 26)	57	3	(German Football Association) Bayer Leverkusen
13	FW	Mohamed Konaté*	12 December 1997 (aged 28)	37	6	(Russian Football Union) Akhmat Grozny
14	DF	Issoufou Dayo	6 August 1991 (aged 34)	80	9	(Qatar Football Association) Umm Salal
15	MF	Abdoul Yoda*	20 December 2000 (aged 25)	3	0	(Moldovan Football Federation) Milsami Orhei
16	GK	Hervé Koffi	16 October 1996 (aged 29)	67	0	(French Football Federation) Angers
17	MF	Stephane Aziz Ki	6 March 1996 (aged 29)	20	3	(Royal Moroccan Football Federation) Wydad AC
18	MF	Ismahila Ouédraogo	5 November 1999 (aged 26)	25	0	(Danish Football Association) OB
19	FW	Georgi Minoungou	25 July 2002 (aged 23)	4	0	(United States Soccer Federation) Seattle Sounders
20	MF	Gustavo Sangaré	8 November 1996 (aged 29)	38	2	(Football Federation of Armenia) Noah
21	FW	Cyriaque Irié	20 June 2005 (aged 20)	4	2	(German Football Association) SC Freiburg
22	MF	Blati Touré	4 August 1994 (aged 31)	58	3	(Egyptian Football Association) Pyramids
23	GK	Kilian Nikiema	22 June 2003 (aged 22)	9	0	(Royal Dutch Football Association) ADO Den Haag
24	MF	Saïdou Simporé	31 August 1992 (aged 33)	15	1	(Egyptian Football Association) National Bank of Egypt
25	DF	Steeve Yago	16 December 1992 (aged 33)	90	1	(Cyprus Football Association) Aris Limassol
26	DF	Arsène Kouassi	11 September 2004 (aged 21)	2	0	(French Football Federation) Lorient
27	FW	Pierre Landry Kaboré	5 July 2001 (aged 24)	6	6	(Scottish Football Association) Heart of Midlothian
28	MF	Josué Tiendrébéogo*	21 November 2002 (aged 23)	10	2	(French Football Federation) Annecy

=== Equatorial Guinea ===
Head coach: Juan Michá

No.	Pos.	Player	Date of birth (age)	Caps	Goals	Club
1	GK	Jesús Owono	1 March 2001 (aged 24)	41	0	(Andorran Football Federation) FC Andorra
2	DF	Néstor Senra	4 January 2002 (aged 23)	11	0	(Royal Spanish Football Federation) Recreativo
3	DF	Marvin Anieboh	26 August 1997 (aged 28)	22	0	(Royal Spanish Football Federation) SS Reyes
4	MF	Álex Balboa	6 March 2001 (aged 24)	16	0	(Royal Spanish Football Federation) Lugo
5	MF	Omar Mascarell	2 February 1993 (aged 32)	12	0	(Royal Spanish Football Federation) Mallorca
6	FW	Iban Salvador	11 December 1995 (aged 30)	55	10	(Polish Football Association) Wisła Płock
7	MF	José Machín	14 August 1996 (aged 29)	33	0	(Italian Football Federation) Vis Pesaro
8	MF	Jannick Buyla	6 October 1998 (aged 27)	35	3	(Royal Spanish Football Federation) Numancia
9	FW	Dorian Jr.	12 May 2001 (aged 24)	23	1	(Danish Football Association) Viborg
10	FW	Emilio Nsue (captain)	30 September 1989 (aged 36)	49	22	(Royal Spanish Football Federation) Intercity
11	DF	Basilio Ndong	17 January 1999 (aged 26)	60	0	(Albanian Football Federation) Tirana
12	DF	Charles Ondo	22 October 2003 (aged 22)	6	0	(United States Soccer Federation) Portland Timbers
13	GK	Aitor Embela	17 April 1996 (aged 29)	10	0	(Royal Spanish Football Federation) Soneja
14	MF	Pedro Obiang	27 March 1992 (aged 33)	27	3	(Italian Football Federation) Monza
15	DF	Carlos Akapo	12 March 1993 (aged 32)	46	2	(Brazilian Football Confederation) Amazonas
16	DF	Saúl Coco	9 February 1999 (aged 26)	31	4	(Italian Football Federation) Torino
17	FW	Josete Miranda	22 July 1998 (aged 27)	50	4	(Hellenic Football Federation) Kalamata
18	DF	Michael Ngaah	10 April 2003 (aged 22)	3	0	(Royal Spanish Football Federation) Ávila
19	FW	Luis Asué	9 July 2001 (aged 24)	30	5	(Chinese Football Association) Shanghai Shenhua
20	MF	Santiago Eneme	29 September 2000 (aged 25)	39	0	(Football Association of the Czech Republic) Sparta Prague
21	DF	Esteban Obiang	7 May 1998 (aged 27)	44	1	(Romanian Football Federation) Argeș Pitești
22	MF	Pablo Ganet	4 November 1994 (aged 31)	57	6	(Football Association of Indonesia) Persita Tangerang
23	GK	Manuel Sapunga	23 November 1992 (aged 33)	6	0	(South African Football Association) Sekhukhune United
24	FW	Loren Zúñiga	18 January 2003 (aged 22)	4	0	(Royal Spanish Football Federation) Real Madrid
25	DF	Javier Mum	24 January 2001 (aged 24)	3	0	(Football Association of Zambia) MUZA
26	FW	José Nabil Ondo	23 November 2005 (aged 20)	8	1	(French Football Federation) Nantes
27	MF	Gael Joel Akogo	21 December 2003 (aged 22)	14	0	(Royal Spanish Football Federation) Granada
28	MF	Álex Masogo	26 January 2001 (aged 24)	5	1	(Bulgarian Football Union) Beroe

=== Sudan ===
Head coach: (Ghana) James Kwesi Appiah

No.	Pos.	Player	Date of birth (age)	Caps	Goals	Club
1	GK	Ali Abu Eshrein	6 December 1989 (aged 36)	40	0	(Sudan Football Association) Al Hilal
2	MF	Abuaagla Abdalla	11 March 1993 (aged 32)	75	3	(Libyan Football Federation) Al-Ahly Benghazi
3	DF	Mohamed Ering	20 October 1997 (aged 28)	39	0	(Sudan Football Association) Al Hilal
4	DF	Altayeb Abdelrazeg	6 September 1991 (aged 34)	16	1	(Sudan Football Association) Al Hilal
5	MF	Walieldin Khedr	15 September 1995 (aged 30)	61	3	(Sudan Football Association) Al Hilal
6	DF	Mustafa Karshoum	6 December 1992 (aged 33)	39	1	(Sudan Football Association) Al Hilal
7	DF	Yaser Awad	15 March 2005 (aged 20)	16	1	(Sudan Football Association) Al Hilal
8	MF	Abdel Raouf	18 July 1993 (aged 32)	47	4	(Sudan Football Association) Al Hilal
9	FW	Yaser Muzmel	1 January 1992 (aged 33)	56	8	(Sudan Football Association) Al Hilal
10	FW	Mohamed Abdelrahman	10 July 1993 (aged 32)	61	23	(Sudan Football Association) Al Hilal
11	FW	John Mano	12 December 2001 (aged 24)	11	0	(Libyan Football Federation) Al-Akhdar
12	DF	Bakhit Khamis (captain)	1 January 1994 (aged 31)	34	0	(Libyan Football Federation) Al-Ahli Tripoli
13	MF	Ammar Taifour	12 April 1997 (aged 28)	18	0	(Tunisian Football Federation) CS Sfaxien
14	FW	Mohamed Eisa	12 July 1994 (aged 31)	14	2	(Football Association of Thailand) Uthai Thani
15	MF	Salah Adel	3 April 1995 (aged 30)	43	1	(Sudan Football Association) Al Hilal
16	GK	Muhamed Alnour Abouja	1 January 2000 (aged 25)	11	0	(Sudan Football Association) Al-Merrikh
17	DF	Mazin Mohamedein	2 May 2000 (aged 25)	16	0	(Libyan Football Federation) Al-Akhdar
18	DF	Awad Zayed	1 January 1993 (aged 32)	24	0	(Sudan Football Association) Al-Merrikh
19	DF	Ahmed Tabanja	2 September 2000 (aged 25)	25	0	(Sudan Football Association) Al-Merrikh
20	FW	Abo Eisa	5 January 1996 (aged 29)	13	1	(Football Association of Thailand) Chonburi
21	GK	Monged Elneel	1 January 1996 (aged 29)	13	0	(Sudan Football Association) Al-Merrikh
22	FW	Al-Jezoli Nouh	24 October 2002 (aged 23)	39	1	(Libyan Football Federation) Al-Ahli Tripoli
23	MF	Abdelsamad Manen	4 May 2005 (aged 20)	4	0	(Sudan Football Association) Al-Zamala SC
24	DF	Muhamed Kesra	25 October 1996 (aged 29)	6	0	(South Sudan Football Association) Jamus
25	DF	Sheddy Barglan	3 October 2002 (aged 23)	3	0	(Royal Dutch Football Association) Den Bosch
26	FW	Aamir Abdallah	8 May 1999 (aged 26)	1	0	(Football Australia) Avondale
27	FW	Muhamed Tia Asad	21 February 2001 (aged 24)	6	1	(Sudan Football Association) Al-Merrikh

== Group F ==
=== Cameroon ===
Head coach: David Pagou

No.	Pos.	Player	Date of birth (age)	Caps	Goals	Club
1	GK	Simon Omossola	5 May 1998 (aged 27)	3	0	(Congolese Association Football Federation) Saint-Éloi Lupopo
2	DF	Junior Tchamadeu	22 December 2003 (aged 21)	5	0	(The Football Association) Stoke City
3	DF	Che Malone	23 May 1999 (aged 26)	3	0	(Algerian Football Federation) USM Alger
4	DF	Christopher Wooh	18 September 2001 (aged 24)	23	2	(Russian Football Union) Spartak Moscow
5	DF	Nouhou Tolo	23 June 1997 (aged 28)	44	1	(United States Soccer Federation) Seattle Sounders FC
6	DF	Gerzino Nyamsi	22 January 1997 (aged 28)	0	0	(Russian Football Union) Lokomotiv Moscow
7	FW	Georges-Kévin Nkoudou	14 February 1995 (aged 30)	19	3	(Saudi Arabian Football Federation) Diriyah
8	MF	Jean Onana	8 January 2000 (aged 25)	12	0	(Italian Football Federation) Genoa
9	FW	Frank Magri	4 September 1999 (aged 26)	17	2	(French Football Federation) Toulouse
10	FW	Bryan Mbeumo	7 August 1999 (aged 26)	27	7	(The Football Association) Manchester United
11	FW	Christian Bassogog (captain)	18 October 1995 (aged 30)	57	8	(Saudi Arabian Football Federation) Al-Okhdood
12	FW	Patrick Soko	31 October 1997 (aged 28)	4	1	(Royal Spanish Football Federation) Almería
13	DF	Darlin Yongwa	21 September 2000 (aged 25)	10	1	(French Football Federation) Lorient
14	FW	Danny Namaso	28 August 2000 (aged 25)	5	0	(French Football Federation) Auxerre
15	MF	Arthur Avom	15 December 2004 (aged 21)	6	1	(French Football Federation) Lorient
16	GK	Devis Epassy	2 February 1993 (aged 32)	10	0	(Romanian Football Federation) Dinamo București
17	DF	Samuel Kotto	3 September 2003 (aged 22)	0	0	(Royal Belgian Football Association) Gent
18	DF	Aboubakar Nagida	28 June 2005 (aged 20)	6	0	(French Football Federation) Rennes
19	MF	Martin Ndzie	16 January 2003 (aged 22)	3	0	(Austrian Football Association) Rapid Wien
20	MF	Olivier Kemen	20 July 1996 (aged 29)	7	1	(Turkish Football Federation) İstanbul Başakşehir
21	FW	Karl Etta Eyong	14 October 2003 (aged 22)	3	0	(Royal Spanish Football Federation) Levante
22	DF	Flavien Enzo Boyomo	7 October 2001 (aged 24)	6	1	(Royal Spanish Football Federation) Osasuna
23	GK	Simon Ngapandouetnbu	12 April 2003 (aged 22)	0	0	(French Football Federation) Montpellier
24	MF	Carlos Baleba	3 January 2004 (aged 21)	11	0	(The Football Association) Brighton & Hove Albion
25	MF	Junior Dina Ebimbe	21 November 2000 (aged 25)	0	0	(French Football Federation) Brest
26	FW	Christian Kofane	27 July 2006 (aged 19)	0	0	(German Football Association) Bayer Leverkusen
27	MF	Arnold Maël Kamdem	18 January 2000 (aged 25)	0	0	(Brazilian Football Confederation) Sport Sinop
28	GK	Edouard Sombang	29 May 1998 (aged 27)	0	0	(Cameroonian Football Federation) Colombe Sportive

=== Gabon ===
Gabon's 28 player squad was announced on 10 December.

Head coach: Thierry Mouyouma

No.	Pos.	Player	Date of birth (age)	Caps	Goals	Club
1	GK	Anse Ngoubi Demba	31 January 2000 (aged 25)	3	0	(Malta Football Association) Mosta
2	DF	Aaron Appindangoyé	20 February 1992 (aged 33)	71	2	(Turkish Football Federation) Sivasspor
3	DF	Anthony Oyono	12 April 2001 (aged 24)	29	0	(Italian Football Federation) Frosinone
4	DF	Alex Moucketou-Moussounda	10 October 2000 (aged 25)	26	1	(Cyprus Football Association) Aris Limassol
5	DF	Bruno Ecuele Manga (captain)	16 July 1988 (aged 37)	109	9	(French Football Federation) Paris 13 Atletico
6	DF	Johann Obiang	5 July 1993 (aged 32)	49	0	(French Football Federation) Orléans
7	FW	Royce Openda	21 April 2002 (aged 23)	1	0	(French Football Federation) Bordeaux
8	MF	Clench Loufilou	12 April 1999 (aged 26)	15	0	(Iraq Football Association) Al-Minaa
9	FW	Pierre-Emerick Aubameyang	18 June 1989 (aged 36)	84	39	(French Football Federation) Marseille
10	FW	Shavy Babicka	1 June 2000 (aged 25)	19	3	(Football Association of Serbia) Red Star Belgrade
11	FW	Jim Allevinah	27 February 1995 (aged 30)	35	10	(French Football Federation) Angers
12	MF	Guélor Kanga	1 August 1990 (aged 35)	82	5	(Turkish Football Federation) Esenler Erokspor
13	DF	Mick Omfia	10 December 2000 (aged 25)	6	0	(Guinean Football Federation) Hafia
14	DF	Urie-Michel Mboula	30 April 2003 (aged 22)	9	0	(French Football Federation) Metz
15	MF	Samaké Nzé Bagnama	28 June 2002 (aged 23)	7	0	(Ivorian Football Federation) Stade d'Abidjan
16	GK	François Bekale	15 February 2002 (aged 23)	1	0	(Guinean Football Federation) Hafia
17	MF	André Biyogo Poko	7 March 1993 (aged 32)	82	4	(Turkish Football Federation) Amed
18	MF	Mario Lemina	1 September 1993 (aged 32)	39	5	(Turkish Football Federation) Galatasaray
19	DF	Jacques Ekomié	19 August 2003 (aged 22)	19	0	(French Football Federation) Angers
20	FW	Denis Bouanga	11 November 1994 (aged 31)	51	15	(United States Soccer Federation) Los Angeles FC
21	DF	Jérémy Oyono	12 April 2001 (aged 24)	11	0	(Italian Football Federation) Frosinone
22	MF	Didier Ndong	17 June 1994 (aged 31)	53	1	(Football Federation Islamic Republic of Iran) Esteghlal
23	GK	Loyce Mbaba	4 May 1998 (aged 27)	14	0	(Ivorian Football Federation) Stella Club
24	FW	Edlin Randy Essang-Matouti	25 July 2003 (aged 22)	3	0	(Algerian Football Federation) USM Khenchela
25	MF	Eric Bocoum	10 March 1996 (aged 29)	8	0	(Football Federation Islamic Republic of Iran) Gol Gohar Sirjan
26	DF	Jonathan Do Marcolino	10 May 2006 (aged 19)	0	0	(French Football Federation) Bourg-Péronnas
27	FW	Teddy Averlant	2 October 1999 (aged 26)	5	0	(French Football Federation) Amiens
28	FW	Malick Evouna	28 November 1992 (aged 33)	34	12	(Gabonese Football Federation) Mangasport

=== Ivory Coast ===
Ivory Coast's 26 player squad was announced on 9 December. Sébastien Haller was ruled out of the tournament with an injury and replaced by Evann Guessand.

Head coach: Emerse Faé

No.	Pos.	Player	Date of birth (age)	Caps	Goals	Club
1	GK	Yahia Fofana	21 August 2000 (aged 25)	29	0	(Turkish Football Federation) Çaykur Rizespor
2	DF	Ousmane Diomande	4 December 2003 (aged 22)	10	1	(Portuguese Football Federation) Sporting CP
3	DF	Ghislain Konan	27 December 1995 (aged 29)	47	0	(Portuguese Football Federation) Gil Vicente
4	MF	Jean Michaël Seri	19 July 1991 (aged 34)	62	4	(Football Association of Slovenia) Maribor
5	DF	Armel Zohouri	5 April 2001 (aged 24)	4	0	(Georgian Football Federation) Iberia 1999
6	MF	Seko Fofana	7 May 1995 (aged 30)	26	7	(French Football Federation) Rennes
7	DF	Odilon Kossounou	4 January 2001 (aged 24)	30	0	(Italian Football Federation) Atalanta
8	MF	Franck Kessié (captain)	19 December 1996 (aged 29)	96	15	(Saudi Arabian Football Federation) Al-Ahli
9	FW	Vakoun Issouf Bayo	10 January 1997 (aged 28)	9	3	(Italian Football Federation) Udinese
10	FW	Wilfried Zaha	10 November 1992 (aged 33)	33	5	(United States Soccer Federation) Charlotte FC
11	FW	Jean-Philippe Krasso	17 July 1997 (aged 28)	25	8	(French Football Federation) Paris FC
12	DF	Willy Boly	3 February 1991 (aged 34)	22	1	(The Football Association) Nottingham Forest
13	DF	Christopher Opéri	29 April 1997 (aged 28)	10	0	(Turkish Football Federation) İstanbul Başakşehir
14	FW	Oumar Diakité	20 December 2003 (aged 22)	25	6	(Royal Belgian Football Association) Cercle Brugge
15	FW	Amad Diallo	11 July 2002 (aged 23)	11	2	(The Football Association) Manchester United
16	GK	Mohamed Koné	7 March 2002 (aged 23)	0	0	(Royal Belgian Football Association) Charleroi
17	DF	Guéla Doué	17 October 2002 (aged 23)	12	1	(French Football Federation) Strasbourg
18	MF	Ibrahim Sangaré	2 December 1997 (aged 28)	52	12	(The Football Association) Nottingham Forest
19	MF	Christ Inao Oulaï	6 April 2006 (aged 19)	2	0	(Turkish Football Federation) Trabzonspor
20	DF	Emmanuel Agbadou	7 June 1997 (aged 28)	16	2	(The Football Association) Wolverhampton Wanderers
21	DF	Evan Ndicka	20 August 1999 (aged 26)	23	0	(Italian Football Federation) Roma
22	FW	Evann Guessand	1 July 2001 (aged 24)	15	2	(The Football Association) Aston Villa
23	GK	Alban Lafont	23 January 1999 (aged 26)	2	0	(Hellenic Football Federation) Panathinaikos
24	FW	Bazoumana Touré	2 March 2006 (aged 19)	1	0	(German Football Association) TSG Hoffenheim
25	MF	Jean-Philippe Gbamin	25 September 1995 (aged 30)	22	0	(French Football Federation) Metz
26	FW	Yan Diomande	14 November 2006 (aged 19)	4	2	(German Football Association) RB Leipzig

=== Mozambique ===
Mozambique's 25 player squad was announced on 8 December. Shaquille, Clesio and Cantolo were included in the squad list as reserve players and did not travel with the team.

Head coach: Chiquinho Conde

No.	Pos.	Player	Date of birth (age)	Caps	Goals	Club
1	GK	Ernan Siluane	9 July 1998 (aged 27)	29	0	(Mozambican Football Federation) Black Bulls
2	DF	Nanani	8 February 1996 (aged 29)	26	0	(Mozambican Football Federation) Songo
3	DF	Nené	15 November 1996 (aged 29)	32	1	(Mozambican Football Federation) Black Bulls
4	DF	Fernando Chamboco	15 June 1998 (aged 27)	9	0	(Mozambican Football Federation) Black Bulls
5	DF	Bruno Langa	31 October 1997 (aged 28)	33	1	(Cyprus Football Association) Pafos
6	MF	Manuel Kambala	21 August 1991 (aged 34)	39	0	(South African Football Association) Polokwane City
7	MF	Domingues (captain)	13 November 1983 (aged 42)	120	17	(Mozambican Football Federation) Songo
8	DF	Edmilson Dove	18 July 1994 (aged 31)	38	0	(Iraq Football Association) Al-Quwa Al-Jawiya
9	FW	Faisal Bangal	5 January 1995 (aged 30)	10	2	(Italian Football Federation) Mestre
10	FW	Geny Catamo	26 January 2001 (aged 24)	38	13	(Portuguese Football Federation) Sporting CP
11	MF	João Bonde	9 January 1997 (aged 28)	4	0	(Mozambican Football Federation) Ferroviário Beira
12	GK	Kimiss Zavala	8 May 2004 (aged 21)	1	0	(Portuguese Football Federation) Marítimo
13	FW	Stanley Ratifo	5 December 1994 (aged 31)	38	9	(German Football Association) Chemie Leipzig
14	DF	Oscar Cherene	28 March 2003 (aged 22)	0	0	(Mozambican Football Federation) Textáfrica
15	DF	Reinildo Mandava	21 January 1994 (aged 31)	44	2	(The Football Association) Sunderland
16	MF	Alfons Amade	12 November 1999 (aged 26)	17	1	(Scottish Football Association) Dunfermline Athletic
17	DF	Mexer	8 September 1987 (aged 38)	63	3	(Turkish Football Federation) Ankara Keçiörengücü
18	FW	Gildo Vilanculos	31 January 1995 (aged 30)	36	4	(Lebanese Football Association) Tadamon Sour
19	FW	Witi	26 August 1996 (aged 29)	41	4	(Portuguese Football Federation) Nacional
20	MF	Keyns Abdala	15 March 2003 (aged 22)	0	0	(Portuguese Football Federation) Chaves
21	MF	Guima	14 November 1995 (aged 30)	20	2	(Association of Football Federations of Azerbaijan) Zira
22	GK	Ivane Urrubal	1 March 1997 (aged 28)	11	0	(Mozambican Football Federation) Songo
23	DF	Diogo Calila	10 October 1998 (aged 27)	4	0	(Portuguese Football Federation) Santa Clara
24	FW	Melque Alexandre	26 June 1997 (aged 28)	26	4	(Mozambican Football Federation) Songo
25	FW	Chamito	14 January 2004 (aged 21)	6	3	(Portuguese Football Federation) Académico Viseu
26	FW	Ângelo Cantolo*	23 May 2003 (aged 22)	2	0	(Mozambican Football Federation) Chingale
27	FW	Clésio*	11 October 1994 (aged 31)	62	9	(Mozambican Football Federation) Black Bulls
28	MF	Shaquille*	24 November 1997 (aged 28)	42	0	(Angolan Football Federation) Sagrada Esperança

== Statistics ==
Note: Only the final squad list of each national team is taken into consideration.

=== Player representation by league system ===
Nations in bold are represented at the tournament.

Country	Players	Percent
France	79	11.9%
England	50	7.53%
**South Africa**	32	4.82%
**Egypt**	31	4.67%
Spain	29	4.37%
Turkey	28	4.22%
Italy	26	3.92%
**Tanzania**	25	3.77%
Germany	21	3.16%
**Botswana**	21	3.16%
Portugal	18	2.71%
Saudi Arabia	17	2.56%
**Sudan**	17	2.56%
Belgium	15	2.26%
**Zambia**	14	2.11%
**Tunisia**	13	1.96%
Qatar	12	1.81%
**Mozambique**	11	1.66%
Netherlands	10	1.51%
Scotland	10	1.51%
Russia	9	1.36%
**Morocco**	9	1.36%
United States	9	1.36%
Libya	9	1.36%
**Zimbabwe**	8	1.2%
Switzerland	8	1.2%
**Uganda**	7	1.05%
Greece	7	1.05%
Romania	7	1.05%
**Algeria**	6	0.9%
Cyprus	6	0.9%
Israel	6	0.9%
Croatia	5	0.75%
**Angola**	5	0.75%
Denmark	5	0.75%
Czech Republic	5	0.75%
United Arab Emirates	4	0.6%
Azerbaijan	4	0.6%
Slovenia	3	0.45%
**Ivory Coast**	3	0.45%
Armenia	3	0.45%
Serbia	3	0.45%
Wales	3	0.45%
Finland	3	0.45%
Iraq	3	0.45%
South Sudan	3	0.45%
Thailand	3	0.45%
Sweden	2	0.3%
China	2	0.3%
Austria	2	0.3%
Malta	2	0.3%
Guinea	2	0.3%
Iran	2	0.3%
Rwanda	2	0.3%
Bulgaria	2	0.3%
Poland	2	0.3%
**Benin**	2	0.3%
Brazil	2	0.3%
Bahrain	1	0.15%
Norway	1	0.15%
**Nigeria**	1	0.15%
Ethiopia	1	0.15%
North Macedonia	1	0.15%
Andorra	1	0.15%
Ukraine	1	0.15%
Moldova	1	0.15%
Slovakia	1	0.15%
Australia	1	0.15%
Indonesia	1	0.15%
Albania	1	0.15%
**Cameroon**	1	0.15%
(Democratic Republic of the Congo) **DR Congo**	1	0.15%
**Gabon**	1	0.15%
(Georgia (country)) Georgia	1	0.15%
Lebanon	1	0.15%

=== Player representation by club ===
Players	Clubs
11	(Sudan) Al Hilal
10	(Egypt) Al Ahly
9	(Tanzania) Simba (South Africa) Orlando Pirates
8	(South Africa) Mamelodi Sundowns
7	(Egypt) Zamalek (Egypt) Pyramids (Botswana) Jwaneng Galaxy
6	(Sudan) Al-Merrikh (England) Sunderland (Tanzania) Young Africans
5	(France) Angers (Tunisia) Espérance de Tunis (Tanzania) Azam (France) Paris FC (France) Lorient (Botswana) Gaborone United
4	13 clubs
3	26 clubs
2	79 clubs
1	261 clubs

=== Player representation by club confederation ===
Confederation	Players	Percentage
UEFA	381	57.29%
CAF	225	33.83%
AFC	47	7.07%
CONCACAF	9	1.35%
CONMEBOL	2	0.30%
Free agent	1	0.15%
