= 2025 Africa Cup of Nations Group D =

Football tournament group stage

Group D of the 2025 Africa Cup of Nations took place from 23 to 30 December 2025. The group consisted of Senegal, DR Congo, Benin, and Botswana.

Senegal and DR Congo as the top two teams, along with Benin as one of the four best third-placed teams, advanced to the round of 16.

== Teams ==
Draw position	Team	Zone	Method of qualification	Date of qualification	Finals appearance	Last appearance	Previous best performance	FIFA Rankings	
Draw position	Team	Zone	Method of qualification	Date of qualification	Finals appearance	Last appearance	Previous best performance	December 2024 (Note: The rankings of December 2024 were used for seeding for the final draw.)	December 2025
D1	Senegal	WAFU	Group L winners	15 October 2024	18th	2023	Winners (2021)	17	TBA
D2	DR Congo	UNIFFAC	Group H winners	15 October 2024	21st	2023	Winners (1968, 1974)	61	TBA
D3	Benin	WAFU	Group D runners-up	18 November 2024	5th	2019	Quarter-finals (2019)	94	TBA
D4	Botswana	COSAFA	Group C runners-up	19 November 2024	2nd	2012	Group stage (2012)	136	TBA

== Standings ==
Pos	Team	Pld	W	D	L	GF	GA	GD	Pts	Qualification
1	Senegal	3	2	1	0	7	1	+6	7	Advance to knockout stage
2	DR Congo	3	2	1	0	5	1	+4	7	Advance to knockout stage
3	Benin	3	1	0	2	1	4	−3	3	Advance to knockout stage
4	Botswana	3	0	0	3	0	7	−7	0	

Source: CAF
Rules for classification: Group stage tiebreakers

== Matches ==
All times are local, CET (UTC+1).

=== Senegal vs Botswana ===
23 December 2025
16:00

Senegal	3–0	Botswana
Jackson 40', 58'; C. Ndiaye 90'	Report

Tangier Grand Stadium, Tangier
Attendance: 18,591
Referee: Abdel Aziz Bouh (Mauritania)

Senegal	Botswana

GK	16	Édouard Mendy
RB	15	Krépin Diatta	(yellow card) 44'
CB	3	Kalidou Koulibaly (c)
CB	19	Moussa Niakhaté
LB	14	Ismail Jakobs
CM	5	Idrissa Gueye
CM	26	Pape Gueye		(substituted off) 69'
RW	18	Ismaïla Sarr		(substituted off) 85'
AM	13	Iliman Ndiaye		(substituted off) 69'
LW	10	Sadio Mané		(substituted off) 78'
CF	11	Nicolas Jackson		(substituted off) 78'
Substitutes:
MF	8	Lamine Camara		(substituted on) 69'
FW	27	Ibrahim Mbaye		(substituted on) 69'
FW	12	Cherif Ndiaye		(substituted on) 78'
MF	6	Pathé Ciss		(substituted on) 78'
FW	21	Cheikh Sabaly		(substituted on) 85'
Manager:
Pape Thiaw

GK	23	Goitseone Phoko
RB	5	Alford Velaphi
CB	4	Mosha Gaolaolwe
CB	3	Thatayaone Ditlhokwe (c)
LB	12	Mothusi Johnson
DM	18	Lebogang Ditsele
RM	11	Tumisang Orebonye		(substituted off) 61'
CM	15	Mothusi Cooper		(substituted off) 81'
CM	6	Gape Mohutsiwa	(yellow card) 35'	(substituted off) 80'
LM	7	Kabelo Seakanyeng		(substituted off) 80'
CF	9	Omaatla Kebatho	(yellow card) 51'	(substituted off) 61'
Substitutes:
FW	21	Thabo Maponda		(substituted on) 61'
FW	10	Thabang Sesinyi		(substituted on) 61'
FW	17	Thatayaone Kgamanyane		(substituted on) 80'
MF	14	Godiraone Modingwane		(substituted on) 80'
MF	22	Gilbert Baruti		(substituted on) 81'
Manager:
(South Africa) Morena Ramoreboli

=== DR Congo vs Benin ===
23 December 2025
13:30

DR Congo	1–0	Benin
Bongonda 16'	Report

Al Medina Stadium, Rabat
Attendance: 13,073
Referee: Abongile Tom (South Africa)

DR Congo	Benin

GK	1	Lionel Mpasi
RB	2	Aaron Wan-Bissaka
CB	22	Chancel Mbemba (c)
CB	4	Axel Tuanzebe
LB	26	Arthur Masuaku		(substituted off) 68'
DM	8	Samuel Moutoussamy	(yellow card) 20'
RM	10	Théo Bongonda		(substituted off) 68'
CM	25	Edo Kayembe	(yellow card) 36'	(substituted off) 55'
CM	14	Noah Sadiki
LM	10	Nathanaël Mbuku		(substituted off) 85'
CF	17	Cédric Bakambu	(yellow card) 64'	(substituted off) 85'
Substitutes:
MF	6	Ngal'ayel Mukau		(substituted on) 55'
MF	13	Meschak Elia		(substituted on) 68'
DF	12	Joris Kayembe		(substituted on) 68'
MF	20	Brian Cipenga		(substituted on) 85'
FW	19	Fiston Mayele		(substituted on) 85'
Manager:
(France) Sébastien Desabre

GK	16	Saturnin Allagbé (c)
RB	11	Rachid Moumini	(yellow card) 77'
CB	6	Olivier Verdon
CB	5	Yohan Roche
LB	3	Tamimou Ouorou
CM	15	Sessi D'Almeida		(substituted off) 82'
CM	8	Hassane Imourane
RW	17	Rodolfo Aloko
AM	19	Dodo Dokou
LW	20	Jodel Dossou	(yellow card) 52'	(substituted off) 63'
CF	10	Aiyegun Tosin		(substituted off) 90+1'
Substitutes:
MF	22	Romaric Amoussou	(yellow card) 72'	(substituted on) 63'
MF	4	Samadou Attidjikou		(substituted on) 82'
MF	25	Olatoundji Tessilimi		(substituted on) 90+1'
Manager:
(Germany) Gernot Rohr

=== Senegal vs DR Congo ===
27 December 2025
16:00

Senegal	1–1	DR Congo
Mané 69'	Report	Bakambu 61'

Tangier Grand Stadium, Tangier
Attendance: 41,672
Referee: Lahlou Benbraham (Algeria)

Senegal	DR Congo

GK	16	Édouard Mendy
RB	15	Krépin Diatta
CB	3	Kalidou Koulibaly (c)
CB	19	Moussa Niakhaté
LB	14	Ismail Jakobs
DM	5	Idrissa Gueye
RM	18	Ismaïla Sarr		(substituted off) 62'
CM	13	Iliman Ndiaye		(substituted off) 89'
CM	26	Pape Gueye	(yellow card) 28'	(substituted off) 81'
LM	10	Sadio Mané
CF	11	Nicolas Jackson		(substituted off) 81'
Substitutes:
FW	27	Ibrahim Mbaye		(substituted on) 62'
FW	20	Habib Diallo		(substituted on) 81'
MF	8	Lamine Camara		(substituted on) 81'
FW	21	Cheikh Sabaly		(substituted on) 89'
Manager:
Pape Thiaw

GK	1	Lionel Mpasi
RB	2	Aaron Wan-Bissaka
CB	22	Chancel Mbemba (c)
CB	4	Axel Tuanzebe
LB	26	Arthur Masuaku	(substituted off) 73'
DM	8	Samuel Moutoussamy
RM	10	Théo Bongonda	(substituted off) 66'
CM	6	Ngal'ayel Mukau	(substituted off) 73'
CM	14	Noah Sadiki
LM	13	Meschak Elia	(substituted off) 87'
CF	17	Cédric Bakambu	(substituted off) 66'
Substitutes:
MF	7	Nathanaël Mbuku	(substituted on) 66'
FW	19	Fiston Mayele	(substituted on) 66'
MF	25	Edo Kayembe	(substituted on) 73'
DF	12	Joris Kayembe	(substituted on) 73'
FW	27	Michel-Ange Balikwisha	(substituted on) 87'
Manager:
(France) Sébastien Desabre

=== Benin vs Botswana ===
27 December 2025
13:30

Benin	1–0	Botswana
Roche 28'	Report

Rabat Olympic Stadium, Rabat
Attendance: 7,462
Referee: Shamirah Nabadda (Uganda)

Benin	Botswana

GK	1	Marcel Dandjinou
RB	3	Tamimou Ouorou	(yellow card) 85'
CB	6	Olivier Verdon
CB	13	Mohamed Tijani
LB	5	Yohan Roche
CM	15	Sessi D'Almeida		(substituted off) 54'
CM	8	Hassane Imourane
RW	10	Aiyegun Tosin		(substituted off) 82'
AM	19	Dodo Dokou
LW	18	Junior Olaitan
CF	9	Steve Mounié (c)
Substitutes:
MF	4	Attidjikou Samadou		(substituted on) 54'
FW	17	Rodolfo Aloko	(yellow card) 90+4'	(substituted on) 85'
Manager:
(Germany) Gernot Rohr

GK	23	Goitseone Phoko
RB	5	Alford Velaphi
CB	4	Mosha Gaolaolwe
CB	3	Thatayaone Ditlhokwe (c)
LB	12	Mothusi Johnson
CM	18	Lebogang Ditsele	(yellow card) 44'	(substituted off) 46'
CM	6	Gape Mohutsiwa		(substituted off) 86'
RW	24	Losika Ratshkudu		(substituted off) 46'
AM	11	Tumisang Orebonye		(substituted off) 46'
LW	7	Kabelo Seakanyeng	(yellow card) 13'
CF	9	Omaatla Kebatho		(substituted off) 59'
Substitutes:
MF	22	Gilbert Baruti		(substituted on) 46'
MF	15	Mothusi Cooper		(substituted on) 46'
FW	13	Segolame Boy		(substituted on) 46'
FW	10	Thabang Sesinyi		(substituted on) 59'
FW	21	Thabo Maponda		(substituted on) 86'
Manager:
(South Africa) Morena Ramoreboli

=== Benin vs Senegal ===
30 December 2025
20:00

Benin	0–3	Senegal
	Report	Seck 38'; H. Diallo 62'; C. Ndiaye 90+7' (pen.)

Tangier Grand Stadium, Tangier
Attendance: 26,707
Referee: Samuel Uwikunda (Rwanda)

Benin	Senegal

GK	1	Marcel Dandjinou
RB	3	Tamimou Ouorou		(substituted off) 85'
CB	6	Olivier Verdon
CB	13	Mohamed Tijani
LB	5	Yohan Roche
CM	8	Hassane Imourane
CM	4	Attidjikou Samadou
RW	10	Aiyegun Tosin	(yellow card) 24'	(substituted off) 85'
AM	19	Dodo Dokou	(yellow card) 20'	(substituted off) 46'
LW	18	Junior Olaitan		(substituted off) 85'
CF	9	Steve Mounié (c)	(yellow card) 82'
Substitutes:
FW	17	Rodolfo Aloko		(substituted on) 46'
DF	11	Rachid Moumini	(yellow card) 90+4'	(substituted on) 85'
MF	22	Romaric Amoussou		(substituted on) 85'
MF	27	Gislain Ahoudo		(substituted on) 85'
Manager:
(Germany) Gernot Rohr

GK	16	Édouard Mendy
RB	15	Krépin Diatta
CB	4	Abdoulaye Seck
CB	3	Kalidou Koulibaly (c)	(red card) 71'
LB	25	El Hadji Malick Diouf
DM	5	Idrissa Gueye
CM	8	Lamine Camara	(yellow card) 32'	(substituted off) 46'
CM	17	Pape Matar Sarr		(substituted off) 81'
RF	13	Iliman Ndiaye		(substituted off) 46'
CF	20	Habib Diallo		(substituted off) 76'
LF	10	Sadio Mané		(substituted off) 88'
Substitutes:
MF	7	Habib Diarra		(substituted on) 46'
FW	27	Ibrahim Mbaye		(substituted on) 46'
DF	2	Mamadou Sarr		(substituted on) 76'
MF	6	Pathé Ciss		(substituted on) 81'
FW	12	Cherif Ndiaye		(substituted on) 88'
Manager:
Pape Thiaw

=== Botswana vs DR Congo ===
30 December 2025
20:00

Botswana	0–3	DR Congo
	Report	Mbuku 31'; Kakuta 41' (pen.), 60'

Al Medina Stadium, Rabat
Attendance: 12,569
Referee: Ahmad Heeralall (Mauritius)

Botswana	DR Congo

GK	23	Goitseone Phoko
RB	2	Thabo Leinanyane
CB	4	Mosha Gaolaolwe
CB	3	Thatayaone Ditlhokwe (c)	(substituted off) 46'
LB	12	Mothusi Johnson
CM	6	Gape Mohutsiwa	(substituted off) 71'
CM	15	Mothusi Cooper
RM	7	Kabelo Seakanyeng	(substituted off) 56'
AM	13	Segolame Boy	(substituted off) 56'
LM	22	Gilbert Baruti	(substituted off) 71'
CF	10	Thabang Sesinyi
Substitutes:
DF	20	Tebogo Kopelang	(substituted on) 46'
DF	19	Chicco Molefe	(substituted on) 56'
FW	11	Tumisang Orebonye	(substituted on) 56'
MF	25	Monty Enosa	(substituted on) 71'
MF	14	Godiraone Modingwane	(substituted on) 71'
Manager:
(South Africa) Morena Ramoreboli

GK	1	Lionel Mpasi
RB	24	Gedeon Kalulu
CB	22	Chancel Mbemba (c)
CB	15	Rocky Bushiri Kiranga
LB	12	Joris Kayembe
CM	6	Ngal'ayel Mukau
CM	18	Charles Pickel	(substituted off) 74'
RM	13	Meschak Elia	(substituted off) 57'
AM	11	Gaël Kakuta	(substituted off) 74'
LM	7	Nathanaël Mbuku	(substituted off) 57'
CF	19	Fiston Mayele	(substituted off) 89'
Substitutes:
MF	10	Théo Bongonda	(substituted on) 57'
MF	27	Michel-Ange Balikwisha	(substituted on) 57'
MF	14	Noah Sadiki	(substituted on) 74'
FW	9	Samuel Essende	(substituted on) 74'
FW	20	Brian Cipenga	(substituted on) 89'
Manager:
(France) Sébastien Desabre
