= Dandjinou =

Dandjinou is a surname. Notable people with the surname include:

- Remis Fulgance Dandjinou (born 1968), Burkinabese ambassador in France
- Marcel Dandjinou (born 1998), Beninese footballer
- William Dandjinou (born 2001), Canadian short-track speed skater
