= 2014–15 Mascom Top 8 Cup =

Football tournament season in Botswana

2014-15 Mascom Top 8 Cup
Tournament details
- Country: Botswana
- Teams: 8

Final positions
- Champions: Gaborone United (2nd title)
- Runners-up: Township Rollers

Tournament statistics
- Matches played: 13
- Goals scored: 42 (3.23 per match)
- Top goal scorer(s): Benson Shilongo (5 goals)

Awards
- Best player: Goitseone Phoko

The 2014–15 Mascom Top 8 Cup was the fourth edition of the Mascom Top 8 Cup. It was played from October 30, 2014 to April 18, 2015 and featured the top eight teams from the 2013-14 Botswana Premier League. Gaborone United defeated Township Rollers in the final to win a record second title.

== Format ==
The quarterfinals and semifinals were played over two legs both home and away, with only one final in a predetermined venue. Three points were awarded for a win, one point for a draw and none for a loss. Aggregate score was used to determine the winner of a round. Where the aggregate score was equal away goals were used to pick out the victor and if those were equal the tied teams went into a penalty shootout. There was no quarterfinal draw. The teams were seeded based on their position in the table, with the first placed team facing off against the eighth placed team.

== Quarterfinals ==
First legs
Date	Home	Score	Away
October 30	Police XI	2-2	BDF XI
October 31	Motlakase Power Dynamos	1-3	Township Rollers
November 2	Nico United	3-0	Mochudi Centre Chiefs
November 2	Satmos	0-3	Gaborone United

Second legs
Date	Home	Score	Away
November 8	BDF XI	1-1	Police XI
November 9	Gaborone United	4-1	Satmos
November 11	Township Rollers	5-0	Motlakase Power Dynamos
November 20	Mochudi Centre Chiefs	1-0	Nico United

== Semifinals ==
First legs
Date	Home	Score	Away
February 21	Gaborone United	2-1	Nico United
February 22	BDF XI	1-2	Township Rollers

Second legs
Date	Home	Score	Away
March 13	Township Rollers	2-1	BDF XI
March 15	Nico United	0-1	Gaborone United

== Final ==
Final
Date	Winner	Score	Runners up
April 18	Gaborone United	2-1	Township Rollers

== Awards ==
- Top goalscorer | (Namibia) Benson Shilongo | Gaborone United
- Player of the tournament | (Botswana) Goitseone Phoko | Gaborone United
- Goalkeeper of the tournament | (Botswana) Goitseone Phoko | Gaborone United
- Coach of the tournament | (Zimbabwe) Rahman Gumbo | Gaborone United
- Referee of the tournament | (Botswana) Joshua Bondo
- Assistant referee of the tournament | (Botswana) Kitso Sibanda
