= Nicolas Jackson =

Senegalese footballer (born 2001)

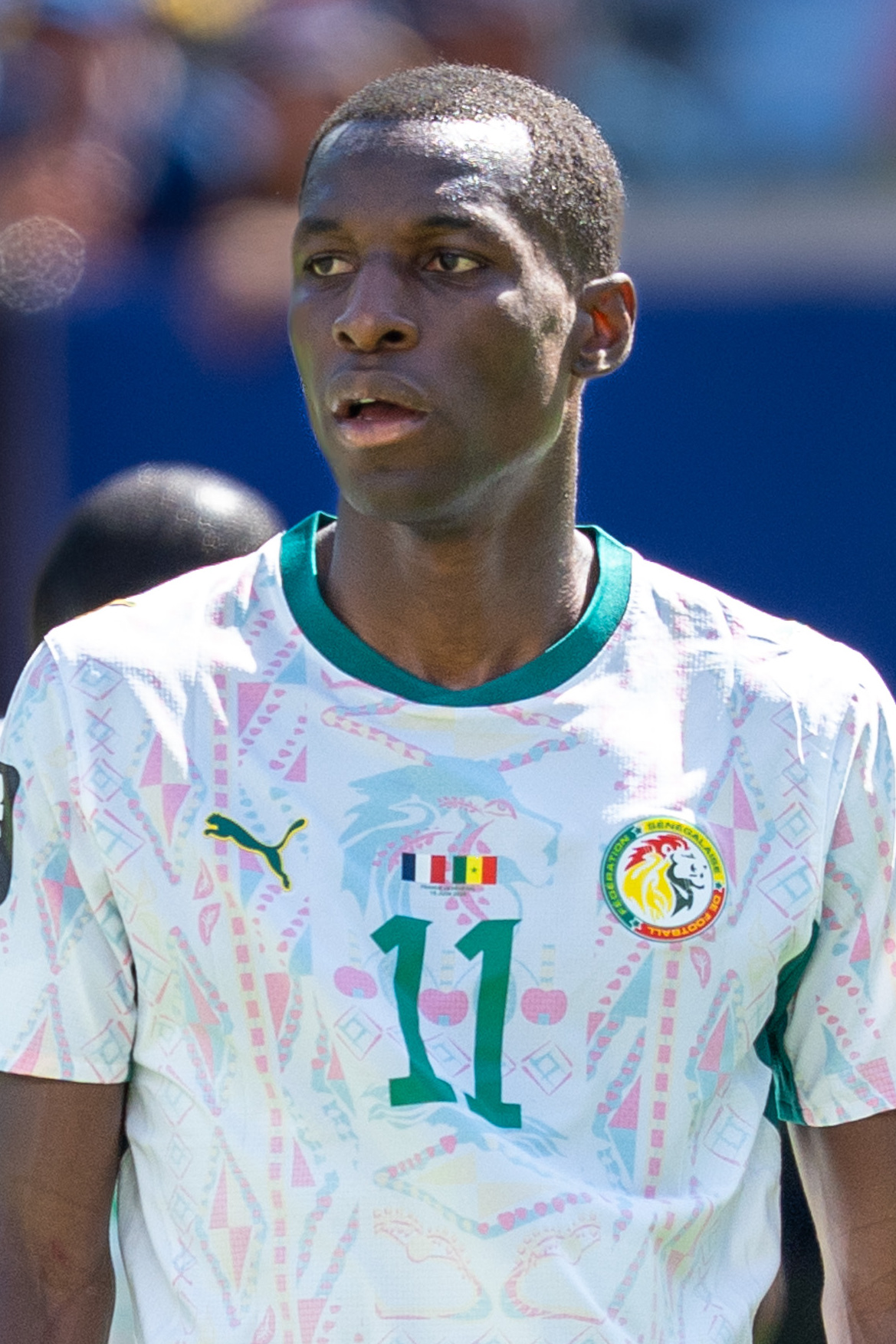
- Jackson with Senegal in 2026

Personal information
- Full name: Nicolas Jackson
- Date of birth: 20 June 2001 (age 25)
- Place of birth: Banjul, Gambia
- Height: 1.87 m (6 ft 2 in)
- Position: Striker

Team information
- Current team: Aston Villa
- Number: 11

Youth career
- 2017–2018: A.S.C. Tiléne

Senior career*
Years	Team	Apps	(Gls)
2018–2019	Casa Sports	5	(2)
2019–2022	Villarreal B	25	(5)
2020–2021	→ Mirandés (loan)	16	(1)
2021–2023	Villarreal	35	(12)
2023–2026	Chelsea	65	(24)
2025–2026	→ Bayern Munich (loan)	23	(8)
2026–	Aston Villa	10	(6)

International career^{‡}
2018	Senegal U20	1	(0)
2022–	Senegal	42	(11)
Medal record
Men's football
Representing Senegal
Africa Cup of Nations
Runner-up	2025 Morocco
- * Club domestic league appearances and goals as of 21:14, 21 November 2026 (UTC) ‡ National team caps and goals as of 18:00, 16 November 2026 (UTC)

Nicolas Jackson (born 20 June 2001) is a professional footballer who plays as a striker for Premier League club Aston Villa and the Senegal national team.

Jackson played for Casa Sports in Senegal before joining Villarreal in 2019. After a loan to Mirandés in the Segunda División, he broke through in the reserve team and made his first-team debut in La Liga in 2021. In 2023, he signed an eight-year deal at Chelsea for a reported fee of £32 million.

Born in Gambia, Jackson plays for the Senegal national team, making his senior debut in 2022. He was part of the Senegalese squads at the FIFA World Cup in 2022 and 2026 and the Africa Cup of Nations in 2023 and 2025.

== Early life ==
Jackson's birthplace is uncertain: several sources claim he was born in Banjul, The Gambia, while Chelsea and Bayern official profiles claim he was born in Djibonker, Senegal, to a Gambian father and Senegalese mother. In 2017, in the aftermath of the 2016 Gambian presidential election, the family moved to Ziguinchor, Senegal.

== Club career ==
=== Early career ===
Jackson began playing for local side ASC Tilene before joining Casa Sports, where he was a part of the first team squad during the 2018–19 season. He was also named man of the match in a 1–1 Ligue 1 draw against AS Pikine on 16 November 2018.

=== Villarreal ===
In September 2019, Jackson agreed to a contract with La Liga side Villarreal, being assigned to the Juvenil A squad.

==== Loan to Mirandés ====
On 5 October 2020, Jackson was loaned to Segunda División side Mirandés for the 2020–21 season. He made his professional debut thirteen days later, coming on as a second-half substitute for Antonio Caballero in a 0–0 home draw against Mallorca.

Jackson scored his first professional goal on 28 November 2020, netting the opener in a 1–1 home draw against Castellón. It was his only goal of the season as the Jabatos finished in 10th place.

==== Breakthrough ====
Upon returning, Jackson played for Villarreal's B-team in Primera División RFEF, scoring seven goals as the side achieved promotion to the second division. He made his first team – and La Liga – debut on 3 October 2021, replacing Arnaut Danjuma late into a 2–0 home win over Real Betis.

Jackson scored his first goal in the top tier on 13 August 2022, netting the opener in a 3–0 away win over Real Valladolid. Thirteen days later, he and teammate Álex Baena were promoted to the main squad.

In January 2023, Villarreal agreed a £22.5 million deal from AFC Bournemouth for the signing of Jackson, but he failed his medical due to hamstring issues, and the transfer did not materialise. After returning to action in March, he scored nine goals within the months of April and May, which included braces against Celta Vigo, Athletic Bilbao and Cádiz.

=== Chelsea ===
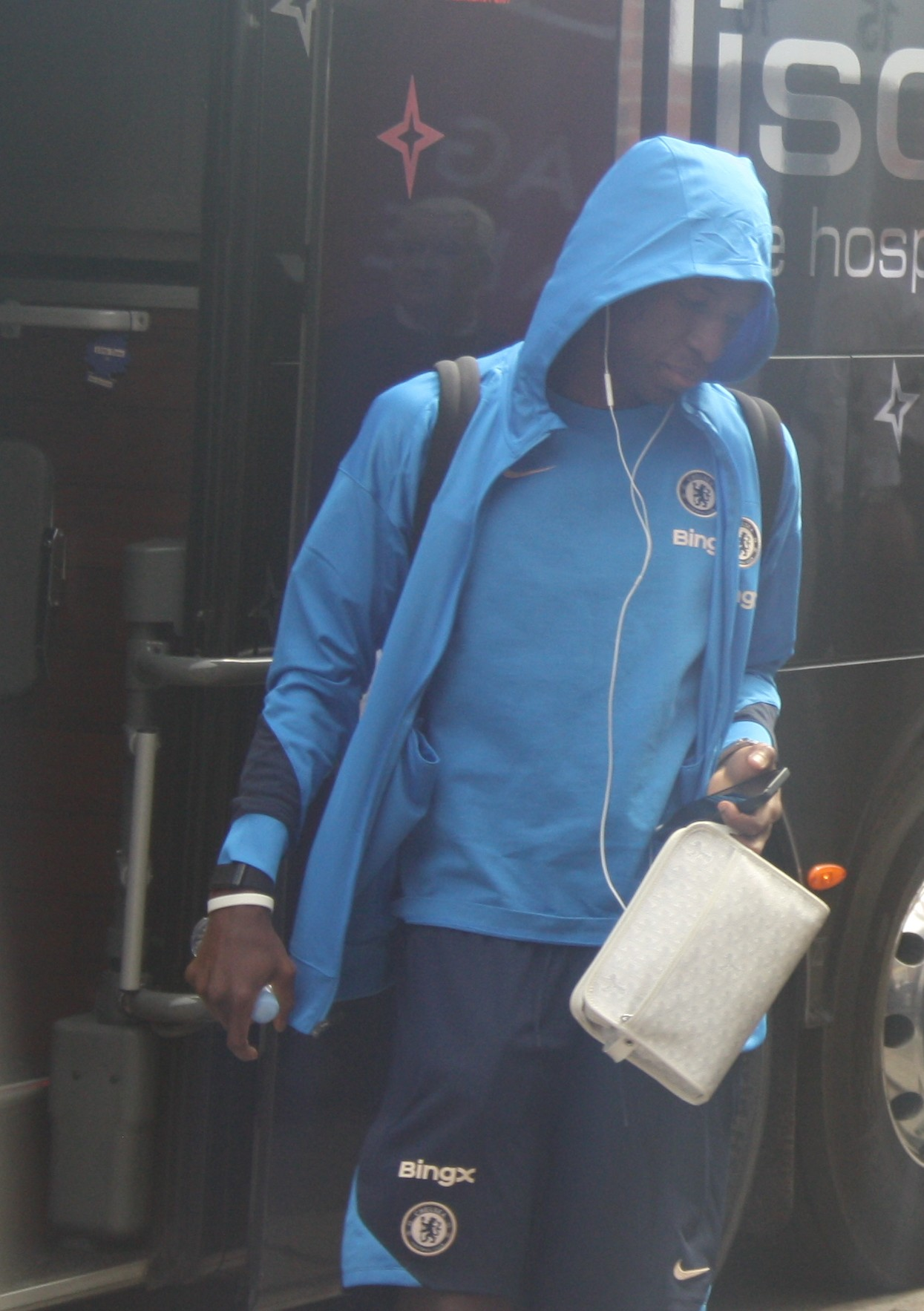
Jackson with Chelsea in April 2025.

On 30 June 2023, Jackson signed for Premier League club Chelsea on an eight-year deal through 2031 for a fee reported to be £32 million. On 13 August, he made his debut for the club in a 1–1 draw against Liverpool in the Premier League. He scored his first Chelsea goal on 25 August 2023 against newly promoted side Luton Town, helping Chelsea to a 3–0 win at Stamford Bridge. On 6 November, Jackson scored twice in second-half stoppage time to complete a hat-trick in a 4–1 away win over Tottenham Hotspur. He scored again in the next match against Manchester City, which ended in a 4–4 home draw.

On 15 April 2024, Jackson scored his tenth Premier League goal of the season, and provided an assist for Cole Palmer's goal in a 6–0 win over Everton. As Palmer had already reached double digits in league goals, this became the first Chelsea season since 2017–18 in which two players had scored ten or more Premier League goals in a season. On 5 May 2024, Jackson scored twice and provided an assist for Palmer in a 5–0 home win over West Ham United. He scored 14 league goals across 35 appearances, making him the second highest African goal scorer in the 2023–24 season only behind Liverpool's Mohamed Salah.

On 13 September 2024, Jackson signed a two-year contract extension with Chelsea, extending his contract until 2033. He won the Premier League Goal of the Month award for October 2024 for the opening goal of a 2–1 win over Newcastle United on 27 October.

On 1 May 2025, Jackson scored a brace in the first leg of the Conference League semi-final which ended in a 4–1 away win over Djurgården. He was later sent off on 11 May for a deliberate elbow in a Premier League match against Newcastle United. On 28 May, he netted the second goal for Chelsea in a 4–1 win over Real Betis in the 2025 UEFA Conference League final. A month later, on 20 June, he was shown a straight red card for a reckless challenge just four minutes after coming on as a substitute in a 3–1 loss to Flamengo during the 2025 FIFA Club World Cup.

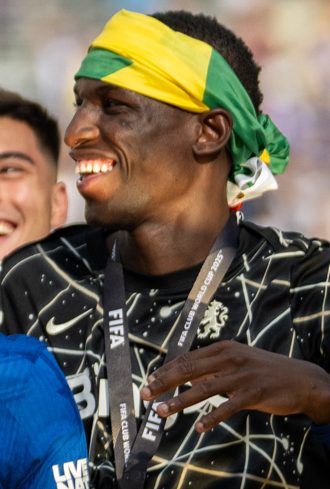
Jackson with Chelsea in 2025.

==== Loan to Bayern Munich ====
On 1 September 2025, Jackson joined Bundesliga club Bayern Munich on a season-long loan for a reported fee of €16.5m. Later that month, on 30 September, he scored his first goal for the club in a 5–1 away win over Cypriot First Division club Pafos in the Champions League.

On 19 April 2026, he won the 2025–26 Bundesliga with Bayern Munich and their 35th league title, starting and scoring the second goal during a 4–2 home win over VfB Stuttgart.

=== Aston Villa ===
On 28 August 2026, Jackson signed for fellow Premier League club Aston Villa, reuniting with manager Unai Emery who he worked with at Villarreal. The transfer fee was undisclosed, but was reported to be an initial £47.5 million, which could rise to £65 million with add-ons.

Jackson scored his first goal for Aston Villa on 8 September 2026, in a 3–2 away victory over Club Brugge in the Champions League. On 24 October 2026, Jackson scored two decisive goals against Manchester City, ending the clubs long-standing win streak in the Premier League. Jackson was named Professional Footballers' Association Premier League Fan's Player of the Month for October 2026, after six goals in six Premier League games. On 13 November 2026, Jackson was also named Premier League Player of the Month for October.

== International career ==
Jackson represented Senegal at under-20 level, receiving his first call-up in November 2018.

After being called up to the full side by manager Aliou Cissé for two friendlies in September 2022, Jackson was included in the 26-man list for the 2022 FIFA World Cup on 11 November 2022. He made his full international debut in Senegal's opening match of the competition, replacing Krépin Diatta in a 2–0 loss against the Netherlands.

In December 2023, he was named in Senegal's squad for the postponed 2023 Africa Cup of Nations held in the Ivory Coast. He came on as a substitute in all four games as the defending champions made it to the last 16.

On 11 October 2024, he scored his first international goal, concluding a 4–0 home win over Malawi in 2025 Africa Cup of Nations qualification.

He was part of the 2025 African Cup of Nations with Senegal. He scored a brace in the opening game against Botswana. Later, in the round of 16, he assisted Papa Gueye in a 3-1 victory for them against Sudan. Later, he became AFCON champion with Senegal after defeating Morocco in the final. Morocco were later awarded the AFCON title, due to the Senegalese team walking off the pitch in protest during the match, leading the Confederation of African Football to declare that they had thereby "forfeited the Final".

On 21 May 2026, Jackson was officially selected by Senegal's coach Pape Thiaw from his list of 28 players to participate in the 2026 FIFA World Cup, where he assisted Ismaïla Sarr's second goal in a 3–2 defeat against Norway.

== Career statistics ==
=== Club ===
As of match played 21 November 2026

Appearances and goals by club, season and competition
Club	Season	League			National cup (Note: Includes Copa del Rey, FA Cup, DFB-Pokal)		League cup (Note: Includes EFL Cup)		Continental		Other		Total	
Club	Season	Division	Apps	Goals	Apps	Goals	Apps	Goals	Apps	Goals	Apps	Goals	Apps	Goals
Casa Sports	2018–19	Ligue 1 (Senegal)	5	2	0	0	0	0	—		—		5	2
Mirandés	2020–21	Segunda División	16	1	1	0	—		—		—		17	1
Villarreal B	2021–22	Primera División RFEF	25	5	—		—		—		2 (Note: Appearances in Primera División RFEF promotion play-offs)	2	27	7
Villarreal	2021–22	La Liga	9	0	1	0	—		0	0	0	0	10	0
Villarreal	2022–23	La Liga	26	12	2	0	—		10 (Note: Appearances in UEFA Conference League)	1	—		38	13
Villarreal	Total		40	14	3	0	—		10	1	0	0	53	15
Chelsea	2023–24	Premier League	35	14	4	2	5	1	—		—		44	17
Chelsea	2024–25	Premier League	30	10	0	0	0	0	4	3	3 (Note: Appearances in FIFA Club World Cup)	0	37	13
Chelsea	Total		65	24	4	2	5	1	4	3	3	0	81	30
Bayern Munich (loan)	2025–26	Bundesliga	23	8	1	0	—		10 (Note: Appearances in UEFA Champions League)	3	—		34	11
Aston Villa	2026–27	Premier League	10	6	0	0	1	0	4	3	—		15	9
Career total			179	58	19	2	6	1	28	10	5	2	227	73

=== International ===
As of match played 16 November 2026

Appearances and goals by national team and year
National team	Year	Apps	Goals
Senegal	2022	1	0
Senegal	2023	5	0
Senegal	2024	13	1
Senegal	2025	9	6
Senegal	2026	14	4
Total		42	11

Senegal score listed first, score column indicates score after each Jackson goal.

List of international goals scored by Nicolas Jackson
No.	Date	Venue	Cap	Opponent	Score	Result	Competition
1	11 October 2024	Abdoulaye Wade Stadium, Diamniadio, Senegal	17	Malawi	4–0	4–0	2025 Africa Cup of Nations qualification
2	9 September 2025	Stade des Martyrs, Kinshasa, DR Congo	22	DR Congo	2–2	3–2	2026 FIFA World Cup qualification
3	10 October 2025	Juba Stadium, Juba, South Sudan	23	South Sudan	4–0	5–0	2026 FIFA World Cup qualification
4	18 November 2025	Antalya Stadium, Antalya, Turkey	26	Kenya	1–0	8–0	Friendly
5	18 November 2025	Antalya Stadium, Antalya, Turkey	26	Kenya	3–0	8–0	Friendly
6	23 December 2025	Tangier Grand Stadium, Tangier, Morocco	27	Botswana	1–0	3–0	2025 Africa Cup of Nations
7	23 December 2025	Tangier Grand Stadium, Tangier, Morocco	27	Botswana	2–0	3–0	2025 Africa Cup of Nations
8	28 March 2026	Stade de France, Saint-Denis, France	32	Peru	1–0	2–0	Friendly
9	25 September 2026	Zimpeto Stadium, Maputo, Mozambique	38	Mozambique	1–0	1–1	2027 Africa Cup of Nations qualification
10	12 November 2026	Leopold Sédar Senghor Stadium, Dakar, Senegal	41	Sudan	1–0	4–1	2027 Africa Cup of Nations qualification
11	16 November 2026	Juba National Stadium, Juba, South Sudan	42	Sudan	1–0	4–2	2027 Africa Cup of Nations qualification

== Honours ==
Chelsea

- UEFA Conference League: 2024–25
- FIFA Club World Cup: 2025
- EFL Cup runner-up: 2023–24

Bayern Munich

- Bundesliga: 2025–26
- DFB-Pokal: 2025–26

Individual

- La Liga Player of the Month: May 2023
- Premier League Player of the Month: October 2026
- Premier League Goal of the Month: October 2024
- BBC Goal of the Month: October 2024
- PFA Premier League Fan's Player of the Month: October 2026
