= Obino Chisala =

Zambian footballer

Personal information
- Date of birth: 14 September 1999 (age 27)
- Place of birth: Lusaka, Zambia
- Height: 1.80 m (5 ft 11 in)
- Position: Midfielder

Team information
- Current team: Al Merrikh
- Number: 15

Youth career
- Happy Hearts FC

Senior career*
Years	Team	Apps	(Gls)
2020–2023	Zanaco		
2023–2025	Costa do Sol	20	(6)
2025–	Al Merrikh	2	(2)

International career^{‡}
2024–	Zambia	9	(2)
- * Club domestic league appearances and goals as of 17:15, 4 October 2025 (UTC) ‡ National team caps and goals as of 22:41, 14 October 2025 (UTC)

Obino Chisala (born 14 September 1999) is a Zambian professional footballer who plays as a midfielder for the Sudan Premier League club Al Merrikh and the Zambia national team.

== Club career ==
A youth product of Happy Hearts FC, Chisala transferred to the Zambia Super League club Zanaco on 8 September 2020 on a 3-year contract. On 17 July 2023, he transferred to the Moçambola club Costa do Sol on a 6-month contract with an option to extend. On 13 January 2024, his contract with Costa do Sol was extended for another year. On 13 January 2025 he joined Sudan Premier League club Al Merrikh.

== International career ==
Chisala was called up to the senior Zambia national team for the 2025 Africa Cup of Nations.
