= Godairone Modingwane =

Motswana footballer

Personal information
- Date of birth: 26 June 1996 (age 30)
- Position: Midfielder

Team information
- Current team: Botswana Defence Force XI

Senior career*
Years	Team	Apps	(Gls)
2016–2017	Morupule Wanderers		
2017–2018	Security Systems		
2018–	Botswana Defence Force XI		

International career^{‡}
2018–	Botswana	7	(0)
- * Club domestic league appearances and goals ‡ National team caps and goals as of 7 October 2020

Godairone Modingwane (born 26 June 1996) is a Motswana footballer who plays as a midfielder for Botswana Defence Force XI.
