= Razack Rachidou =

Beninese footballer (born 2006)

Personal information
- Date of birth: 22 June 2006 (age 20)
- Place of birth: Djougou, Benin
- Position: Attacking midfielder

Team information
- Current team: NK Kustošija on loan from AS Sobemap

Senior career*
Years	Team	Apps	(Gls)
2024–	AS Sobemap		
2025–	→ NK Kustošija (loan)		

International career^{‡}
2024	Benin U20		
2025–	Benin	4	(0)
- * Club domestic league appearances and goals ‡ National team caps and goals as of 15 November 2025

Razack Rachidou (born 22 June 2006) is a Beninese professional footballer who plays as an attacking midfielder for the Benin national team and Croatian football club NK Kustošija.

== Club career ==
Born in Djougou, he played as an 18 year-old for the Benin national under-20 football team, for whom he was man-of-the-match against Ghana U20 at the UFOA B tournament in Lomé in October 2024. He played domestic football for Sobemap Sports. In September 2025, he signed on a season-long loan for Croatia club NK Kustošija, based in Zagreb, with the club also having a buy option.

== International career ==
He was selected for the Benin national football team for the first time in May 2025. He subsequently made his senior debut against Morocco on 9 June 2025 in a 1-0 friendly international defeat. His performances for Benin included playing as a second-half substitute in Benin's 1-0 win over Zimbabwe in the 2026 FIFA World Cup qualification (Group C) in September 2025. He was called-up as part of the Benin squad ahead of the 2025 Africa Cup of Nations.
