= 2018–19 Senegal Premier League =

Senegal Premier League
- Season: 2018–19

The 2018–19 Senegal Premier League is the 54th season (and 11th professional season) of the Senegal Premier League, the top-tier football league in Senegal. The season started on 3 November 2018.

== Standings ==
Final table.

Pos	Team	Pld	W	D	L	GF	GA	GD	Pts	Qualification or relegation
1	Génération Foot (C)	26	13	12	1	43	18	+25	51	Champions
2	ASC Jaraaf	26	10	11	5	28	17	+11	41	
3	Dakar Sacré-Cœur	26	8	14	4	26	21	+5	38	
4	AS des Douanes	26	10	7	9	24	24	0	37	
5	AS Pikine	26	8	12	6	28	24	+4	36	
6	Teungueth FC	26	9	9	8	28	29	−1	36	
7	Stade de Mbour	26	7	12	7	21	24	−3	33	
8	Casa Sports	26	6	14	6	23	20	+3	32	
9	US Gorée	26	7	11	8	31	29	+2	32	
10	ASAC Ndiambour	26	7	11	8	29	28	+1	32	
11	Mbour Petite-Côte FC	26	7	10	9	24	27	−3	31	
12	ASC Niarry Tally	26	7	10	9	22	27	−5	31	
13	ASCE La Linguère (R)	26	5	9	12	20	33	−13	24	Relegated
14	ASC SONACOS (R)	26	4	6	16	15	41	−26	18	Relegated

(C) Champions; (R) Relegated

== Stadiums ==
Team	Location	Stadium	Capacity
Génération Foot	Dakar	Stade Déni Birame Ndao	1,000
ASC Jaraaf	Dakar	Stade Demba Diop	20,000
AS Dakar Sacré-Cœur	Dakar	Stade Léopold Sédar Senghor	80,000
AS Douanes (Senegal)	Dakar	Stade Demba Diop	20,000
AS Pikine	Pikine	Stade Al Djigo	10,000
Teungueth FC	Thiès	Stade Lat-Dior	10,000
Stade de Mbour	Mbour	Stade Caroline Faye	5,000
Casa Sports	Ziguinchor	Stade Aline Sitoe Diatta	10,000
US Gorée	Dakar	Stade Demba Diop	20,000
ASEC Ndiambour	Louga	Stade ASEC Ndiambour	5,000
Mbour Petite-Côte FC	Mbour	Stade Caroline Faye	5,000
ASC Niarry Tally	Dakar	Stade Demba Diop	20,000
ASC Linguère	Saint-Louis	Stade de Linguère	8,000
ASC SUNEOR	Diourbel	Stade Municipal de Djourbel	5,000
