= Yohan Roche =

French-born Beninese footballer (born 1997)

Personal information
- Full name: Yohan Cédric Benjamin Roche
- Date of birth: 7 July 1997 (age 29)
- Place of birth: Lyon, France
- Height: 1.88 m (6 ft 2 in)
- Position: Defender

Team information
- Current team: Iraklis
- Number: 69

Youth career
- –2014: Villefranche

Senior career*
Years	Team	Apps	(Gls)
2014–2017	Villefranche	17	(2)
2017–2019	Reims B	32	(0)
2018–2019	→ Rodez (loan)	26	(0)
2019–2021	Rodez	38	(0)
2021–2023	Adanaspor	49	(4)
2023–2024	Quevilly-Rouen	15	(0)
2023–2024	Quevilly-Rouen B	3	(0)
2024–2026	Petrolul Ploiești	52	(2)
2026–	Iraklis	4	(0)

International career^{‡}
2020–	Benin	29	(2)
- * Club domestic league appearances and goals as of 19 September 2026 ‡ National team caps and goals as of 31 March 2026

Yohan Cédric Benjamin Roche (born 7 July 1997) is a professional footballer who plays as a defender for Super League Greece club Iraklis. Born in France, he plays for the Benin national team.

== Club career ==
Roche began his senior career with FC Villefranche Beaujolais in the Championnat de France Amateur before moving to Stade de Reims in 2017, initially playing with the club’s reserve side. Roche spent the 2018–19 season on loan at Rodez Aveyron Football in the Championnat National, where he helped the club win the league and secure promotion to Ligue 2.

Roche permanently joined Rodez on 20 June 2019, after a successful year-long loan with them. Over the next two seasons, Roche made numerous appearances in France’s second tier before departing for Adanaspor of the Turkish second division in 2021, where he scored four goals in 49 league matches.

In the summer of 2023, Roche returned to France, signing with Quevilly-Rouen Métropole in Ligue 2. After a stint with Quevilly-Rouen, he moved to Romanian side FC Petrolul Ploiești, where he has featured in Liga I.

== International career ==
Roche was born in France to a French father and Beninese mother. He made his debut with the Benin national team in a 2–0 friendly win over Gabon on 12 October 2020. On 27 December 2025, he scored the only goal in a 1–0 victory over Botswana during the 2025 Africa Cup of Nations, securing his nation's first ever win in the competition.

== Career statistics ==
=== International ===
As of matches played on 31 March 2026

Appearances and goals by national team and year
National team	Year	Apps	Goals
Benin	2020	3	0
Benin	2021	3	1
Benin	2022	3	0
Benin	2023	2	0
Benin	2024	5	0
Benin	2025	10	1
Benin	2026	3	0
Total		29	2

Scores and results list Benin's goal tally first, score column indicates score after each Roche goal.

List of international goals scored by Yohan Roche
No.	Date	Venue	Opponent	Score	Result	Competition
1	8 June 2021	Stade de l’Amitié Mathieu Kérékou, Cotonou, Benin	Zambia	2–2	2–2	Friendly
2	27 December 2025	Rabat Olympic Stadium, Rabat, Morocco	Botswana	1–0	1–0	2025 Africa Cup of Nations

== Honours ==
Rodez

- Championnat National: 2018–19
