= Keagile Kgosipula =

Motswana footballer

Personal information
- Date of birth: 2 January 1996 (age 30)
- Place of birth: Kumakwane, Botswana
- Height: 1.82 m (6 ft 0 in)
- Position: Goalkeeper

Team information
- Current team: Township Rollers

Senior career*
Years	Team	Apps	(Gls)
2016–	Township Rollers		

International career^{‡}
2018–	Botswana	2	(0)
- * Club domestic league appearances and goals ‡ National team caps and goals as of 6 March 2021

Keagile Kgosipula (born 2 January 1996) is a Motswana footballer who plays for Township Rollers and the Botswana national football team.

== Career ==
=== International ===
Kgosipula made his senior international debut on 24 March 2018, coming on as a 63rd-minute substitute for Kabelo Dambe in a 1-0 friendly victory over Lesotho.

== Career statistics ==
=== International ===
As of matches played 26 July 2019.

National team	Year	Apps	Goals
Botswana	2018	1	0
Botswana	2019	1	0
Total		2	0

== Honours ==
=== Clubs ===
Township Rollers

- Botswana Premier League:3

2016-17, 2017-18, 2018-19

- Mascom Top 8 Cup:1

2017-18
