= Akanké FC =

Beninese football club

Akanké
- Full name: Akanké FC
- Ground: Stade Municipal de Savalou; Savalou, Benin
- Capacity: 1,500
- League: Benin Premier League
- 2013: 13
Home colours

Akanké FC is an African football club in Benin. They currently play in the Beninese Second Division after being relegated from the Benin Premier League in 2013.

== Stadium ==
Currently the team plays at the Stade Municipal de Savalou. The stadium is able to hold 1,500 spectators.

== League participations ==
- Benin Premier League: 2012–2013
- Benin Second Division: ?-2012, 2013–
