= Samadou Attidjikou =

Beninese footballer (born 2004)

Personal information
- Date of birth: 2 February 2004 (age 22)
- Place of birth: Bassila, Benin
- Height: 1.82 m (6 ft 0 in)
- Position: Midfielder

Team information
- Current team: Smouha
- Number: 15

Youth career
- 2012–2019: AS RASAM
- 2019–2020: Akanké
- 2020–2021: Bani Gansé

Senior career*
Years	Team	Apps	(Gls)
2021–2024	Bani Gansé		
2024–2025	Al Masry	13	(0)
2025–	Smouha	10	(0)

International career^{‡}
2023	Benin U20	2	(0)
2025–	Benin	6	(0)
- * Club domestic league appearances and goals as of 23:55, 21 December 2025 (UTC) ‡ National team caps and goals as of 23:55, 21 December 2025 (UTC)

Samadou Attidjikou (born 2 February 2004) is a Beninese professional footballer who plays as a midfielder for Egyptian Premier League club Smouha and the Benin national team.

== Club career ==
Attidjikou is a product of the youth academies of the Beninese clubs AS RASAM, Akanké and Bani Gansé FC. He began his senior career with club Bani Gansé FC in 2021 and helped them achieve 2 consecutive promotions to the Benin Premier League. On 12 September 2024, he moved to the Egyptian Premier League club Al Masry. On 31 July 2025, he transferred to Smouha on a 2-year contract.

== International career ==
Attidjikou was called up to the Benin U20s by Mathias Déguénon for the 2023 U-20 Africa Cup of Nations. He made the senior Benin national team for the 2025 Africa Cup of Nations.
