= Thabo Leinanyane =

Motswana footballer

Personal information
- Full name: Thabo Kebonyemodisa Leinanyane
- Date of birth: 27 July 1993 (age 33)
- Place of birth: Lobatse, Botswana
- Height: 1.75 m (5 ft 9 in)
- Position: Defender

Team information
- Current team: Jwaneng Galaxy

Senior career*
Years	Team	Apps	(Gls)
2013–2015	BMC Lobatse		
2015–	Jwaneng Galaxy	340	

International career^{‡}
2017–	Botswana	21	(0)
- * Club domestic league appearances and goals as of 28 August 2025 ‡ National team caps and goals as of 26 July 2026

Thabo Leinanyane (born 27 July 1993) is a Botswana footballer who currently plays for Jwaneng Galaxy.

== Career statistics ==
=== International ===
As of match played 30 December 2025

Appearances and goals by national team and year
National team	Year	Apps	Goals
Botswana	2017	3	0
Botswana	2018	–	
Botswana	2019	10	0
Botswana	2020	–	
Botswana	2021	4	0
Botswana	2022	–	
Botswana	2023	–	
Botswana	2024	1	0
Botswana	2025	3	0
Total		21	0
