= Mothusi Cooper =

Motswana footballer

Personal information
- Full name: Mothusi Cooper
- Date of birth: 19 July 1997 (age 29)
- Place of birth: Tsabong
- Position: Attacking midfielder

Team information
- Current team: Mouloudia oujda
- Number: 24

Senior career*
Years	Team	Apps	(Gls)
2017–2018	Extension Gunners		
2018–2020	Township Rollers		
2020–	Lusaka Dynamos		

International career^{‡}
2018–	Botswana	7	(0)
- * Club domestic league appearances and goals as of 29 August 2009 ‡ National team caps and goals as of 4 October 2019

Mothusi Cooper (born 19 July 1997) is a Motswana footballer who plays as a midfielder for Tonota F.C in the Botswana Premier League. He is also a full international for Botswana.

== International career ==
Cooper made his senior debut in 2019 under interim manager Mogomotsi Mpote. He played a crucial role in the squad that reached the 2019 COSAFA Cup final. However, in November 2019, he was one of four Botswana international players dropped from the national team by coach Adel Amrouche for drinking alcohol in camp. Following his apology to the manager and federation, Cooper was reinstated and added to the 2021 Africa Cup of Nations qualification squad.

== Honours ==
=== Club ===
- Botswana Premier League:1

2018–19
