= Thatayaone Ditlhokwe =

Motswana footballer (born 1998)

Personal information
- Full name: Thatayaone Galejewe Ditlhokwe
- Date of birth: 21 September 1998 (age 28)
- Place of birth: Gulubane, Botswana
- Height: 1.86 m (6 ft 1 in)
- Positions: Left back; centreback

Team information
- Current team: Al-Wehdat

Senior career*
Years	Team	Apps	(Gls)
2017–2018	Gaborone United		
2018–2020	Township Rollers		
2020–2023	SuperSport United	82	(3)
2023–2025	Kaizer Chiefs	30	(0)
2025	Al-Ittihad	18	(1)
2026	Al-Shomooa	7	(0)
2026–	Al-Wehdat	0	(0)

International career^{‡}
2018–	Botswana	39	(2)
- * Club domestic league appearances and goals as of 26 August 2026 ‡ National team caps and goals as of 2 September 2023

Thatayaone Ditlhokwe (born 21 September 1998) is a Motswana professional footballer who plays as a defender for Jordanian Pro League club Al-Wehdat, and captains the Botswana national team. He is a full Botswana international, having made thirty-nine appearances and scored two goals since his debut on June 1, 2018.

== International career ==
=== International goals ===
Scores and results list Botswana's goal tally first.

No.	Date	Venue	Opponent	Score	Result	Competition
1.	20 April 2019	Lobatse Stadium, Lobatse, Botswana	Seychelles	1–0	2–0	2020 African Nations Championship qualification
2.	2 June 2019	Princess Magogo Stadium, KwaMashu, South Africa	South Africa	2–2	2–2 (4–5 p)	2019 COSAFA Cup

== Honours ==
Township Rollers

- Botswana Premier League: 1

2018–19
