= Goitseone Phoko =

Motswana footballer

Personal information
- Date of birth: 13 December 1994 (age 31)
- Place of birth: Gaborone, Botswana
- Position: Goalkeeper

Team information
- Current team: Siwelele
- Number: 31

Youth career
- Gaborone United

Senior career*
Years	Team	Apps	(Gls)
2012–2023	Gaborone United		
2023–2026	Jwaneng Galaxy		
2026–	Siwelele	3	(0)

International career^{‡}
2015–	Botswana	33	(1)
- * Club domestic league appearances and goals as of 8 May 2025 ‡ National team caps and goals as of 17 June 2026

Goitseone Phoko (born 13 December 1994) is a Botswana professional footballer who plays as a goalkeeper for South African Premiership club Siwelele and the Botswana national team.

During the 2022 COSAFA Cup, he scored a goal for Botswana against Angola.

== International career ==
=== International goals ===
Scores and results list Botswana's goal tally first.

No.	Date	Venue	Opponent	Score	Result	Competition
1.	10 July 2022	King Zwelithini Stadium, Umlazi, South Africa	Angola	1–0	1–0	2022 COSAFA Cup

== Honours ==
=== Clubs ===
Gaborone United

- FA Cup:1

2019-20

- Mascom Top 8 Cup:2

2012-13, 2014-15

=== Individual ===
- Mascom Top 8 Cup Goalkeeper of the Tournament: 2015
- Mascom Top 8 Cup Player of the Tournament: 2015
- Botswana FA Cup Goalkeeper of the Tournament: 2020

== See also ==
- List of one-club men in association football
