= Monty Enosa =

Motswana footballer

Personal information
- Full name: Motlakase Agang Enosa
- Date of birth: 6 February 2004 (age 22)
- Place of birth: Kanye, Botswana
- Positions: Attacking midfielder; striker

Team information
- Current team: Mochudi Centre Chiefs
- Number: 3

Youth career
- –2014: Sebele Young Shooters
- 2014–2021: Eleven Angels

Senior career*
Years	Team	Apps	(Gls)
2021–2023	Eleven Angels		
2023–2024	Masitaoka		
2024–	Mochudi Centre Chiefs		

International career^{‡}
2020	Botswana U17	1	(0)
2022–	Botswana U20	3	(0)
2022–	Botswana	8	(0)
- * Club domestic league appearances and goals as of 16:54, 10 December 2022 (UTC) ‡ National team caps and goals as of 16:54, 10 December 2022 (UTC)

Motlakase Agang Enosa (born 6 February 2004) is a Motswana footballer who currently plays for Botswana Premier League club Mochudi Centre Chiefs and the Botswana national team.

== Club career ==
As a youth Enosa played for Sebele Young Shooters FC before joining Eleven Angels FC at age ten. Despite interest from higher-profile clubs, he decided to remain with Eleven Angels following the club's promotion to the Botswana Premier League following the 2021–22 season, a promotion in which he played a key role. In August 2022, he signed a new contract with the club for two years. At age seventeen he went on to become Angels Eleven FC's youngest first-team scorer.

Earlier in 2022, Enosa was tied as the top scorer in the 2022 Botswana FA Cup with five goals, along with Thato Ogopotse. Both players won a P25,000 cash prize.

In January 2023, it was announced that Enosa had traveled to Europe for the month for trials with clubs from Denmark, Sweden, and Belgium. After returning to Eleven Angels and appearing in a league fixture at the end of the month, Enosa was expected to sign for a European club "anytime soon" after impressing in Denmark. In total Enosa made eleven league appearances, scoring three goals in his debut season in the top flight.

Despite rumors of an imminent move to Europe, it was announced on 2 February 2023 that Elven Angels FC had reached a transfer agreement for Enosa with fellow-Botswana Premier League club Masitaoka FC. He immediately signed a two-year contract with the club.

== International career ==
Enosa was named to Botswana's squad for the 2020 COSAFA Under-17 Championship in November 2020. He represented Botswana at the youth level again at the 2022 COSAFA U-20 Cup and was named Player of the Match for his performance against Zambia in the final match of the Group Stage. In total he made three appearances in the tournament.

In summer 2022, Enosa was called up for the first time by senior national team manager Mogomotsi Mpote for the 2022 COSAFA Cup at age eighteen. He went on to make his senior international debut on 5 July 2022 in a Botswana's opening victory over the Seychelles.

=== International statistics ===
As of match played 5 July 2022

Botswana
Year	Apps	Goals
2022	1	0
Total	1	0
