= Marcel Dandjinou =

Beninese footballer (born 1999)

Personal information
- Full name: Marcel Soukè Dandjinou
- Date of birth: 26 June 1998 (age 28)
- Place of birth: Ganvié, Benin
- Height: 1.83 m (6 ft 0 in)
- Position: Goalkeeper

Team information
- Current team: Kruger United
- Number: 1

Senior career*
Years	Team	Apps	(Gls)
2016–2021	ESAE	11	(0)
2021-2025	JDR Stars	82	(0)
2025-	Kruger United	18	(0)

International career^{‡}
2022-	Benin	22	(0)
- * Club domestic league appearances and goals as of 3 April 2026 ‡ National team caps and goals as of 3 April 2026

Marcel Soukè Dandjinou (born 26 June 1998) is a Beninese professional footballer who plays as a goalkeeper for JDR Stars and the primary starting goalkeeper for the Benin national football team.

== Career ==
=== ESAE ===
In 2016, Dandjinou signed for Beninese side ESAE FC, helping them win the 2019 Benin Cup, their first major trophy.

=== JDR Stars ===
Before the second half of 2020–21, he signed for JDR Stars in South Africa. On 17 March 2021, he debuted for JDR Stars during a 2–1 win over Cape Town Spurs.

=== Kruger United ===
In 2025, as JDR Stars became defunct, he signed for Kruger United as a free agent on the one year short-term contract.
