= 2025 Africa Cup of Nations Group A =

Football tournament group stage

Group A of the 2025 Africa Cup of Nations took place from 21 to 29 December 2025. The group consisted of hosts Morocco, Mali, Zambia, and Comoros.

Morocco and Mali as the top two teams advanced to the round of 16.

== Teams ==
Draw position	Team	Zone	Method of qualification	Date of qualification	Finals appearance	Last appearance	Previous best performance	FIFA Rankings	
Draw position	Team	Zone	Method of qualification	Date of qualification	Finals appearance	Last appearance	Previous best performance	December 2024 (Note: The rankings of December 2024 were used for seeding for the final draw.)	December 2025
A1	Morocco	UNAF	Hosts and Group B winners	27 September 2023	20th	2023	Winners (1976)	14	TBA
A2	Mali	WAFU	Group I winners	15 November 2024	14th	2023	Runners-up (1972)	51	TBA
A3	Zambia	COSAFA	Group G winners	15 November 2024	19th	2023	Winners (2012)	87	TBA
A4	Comoros	COSAFA	Group A winners	15 November 2024	2nd	2021	Round of 16 (2021)	103	TBA

== Standings ==
Pos	Team	Pld	W	D	L	GF	GA	GD	Pts	Qualification
1	Morocco (H)	3	2	1	0	6	1	+5	7	Advance to knockout stage
2	Mali	3	0	3	0	2	2	0	3	Advance to knockout stage
3	Comoros	3	0	2	1	0	2	−2	2	
4	Zambia	3	0	2	1	1	4	−3	2	

Source: CAF
Rules for classification: Group stage tiebreakers
(H) Hosts

== Matches ==
All times are local, CET (UTC+1).

=== Morocco vs Comoros ===
21 December 2025
20:00

Morocco	2–0	Comoros
Brahim 55'; El Kaabi 74'	Report

Prince Moulay Abdellah Stadium, Rabat
Attendance: 60,180
Referee: Jean-Jacques Ndala (DR Congo)

Morocco	Comoros

GK	1	Yassine Bounou
RB	3	Noussair Mazraoui
CB	5	Nayef Aguerd
CB	6	Romain Saïss (c)		(substituted off) 19'
LB	26	Anass Salah-Eddine
DM	4	Sofyan Amrabat	(yellow card) 90'
CM	24	Neil El Aynaoui
CM	8	Azzedine Ounahi		(substituted off) 65'
RF	10	Brahim Díaz	(yellow card) 45+3'	(substituted off) 76'
CF	9	Soufiane Rahimi		(substituted off) 65'
LF	11	Ismael Saibari		(substituted off) 76'
Substitutes:
DF	18	Jawad El Yamiq	(yellow card) 78'	(substituted on) 19'
FW	17	Abde Ezzalzouli		(substituted on) 65'
FW	20	Ayoub El Kaabi		(substituted on) 65'
FW	19	Youssef En-Nesyri		(substituted on) 76'
MF	23	Bilal El Khannouss		(substituted on) 76'
Manager:
Walid Regragui

GK	16	Yannick Pandor
RB	4	Kenan Toibibou		(substituted off) 79'
CB	5	Ahmed Soilihi
CB	8	Yannis Kari	(yellow card) 36'	(substituted off) 67'
LB	2	Ismaël Boura
RM	15	Benjaloud Youssouf		(substituted off) 67'
CM	28	Zaydou Youssouf		(substituted off) 79'
CM	6	Iyad Mohamed
LM	7	Faïz Selemani
AM	10	Youssouf M'Changama (c)		(substituted off) 82'
CF	11	Rafiki Saïd
Substitutes:
DF	3	Abdel-Hakim Abdallah		(substituted on) 67'
DF	22	Saïd Bakari		(substituted on) 67'
DF	12	Kassim M'Dahoma		(substituted on) 79'
MF	18	Yacine Bourhane		(substituted on) 79'
FW	17	Myziane Maolida		(substituted on) 82'
Manager:
(Canada) Stefano Cusin

=== Mali vs Zambia ===
22 December 2025
15:00

Mali	1–1	Zambia
Sinayoko 61'	Report	Daka 90+2'

Mohammed V Stadium, Casablanca
Attendance: 10,124
Referee: Omar Artan (Somalia)

Mali	Zambia

GK	16	Djigui Diarra
RB	26	Woyo Coulibaly
CB	5	Abdoulaye Diaby
CB	15	Mamadou Fofana
LB	3	Amadou Dante
CM	20	Mamadou Sangaré
CM	23	Aliou Dieng (c)	(yellow card) 65'
RW	17	Lassine Sinayoko
AM	19	Kamory Doumbia		(substituted off) 86'
LW	7	Dorgeles Nene		(substituted off) 76'
CF	9	El Bilal Touré		(substituted off) 76'
Substitutes:
FW	8	Mahamadou Doumbia		(substituted on) 76'
FW	21	Gaoussou Diarra		(substituted on) 76'
DF	4	Amadou Haidara		(substituted on) 86'
Manager:
(Belgium) Tom Saintfiet

GK	1	Willard Mwanza
RB	2	Mathews Banda
CB	6	Benson Sakala
CB	21	Dominic Chanda
LB	8	Lubambo Musonda
CM	25	Owen Tembo
CM	5	Miguel Chaiwa		(substituted off) 67'
RW	9	Lameck Banda		(substituted off) 67'
AM	17	Kings Kangwa
LW	10	Fashion Sakala (c)		(substituted off) 78'
CF	20	Patson Daka
Substitutes:
MF	28	David Simukonda	(yellow card) 69'	(substituted on) 67'
FW	11	Joseph Banda		(substituted on) 67'
FW	19	Kennedy Musonda		(substituted on) 78'
Manager:
Moses Sichone

=== Zambia vs Comoros ===
26 December 2025
18:30

Zambia	0–0	Comoros
	Report

Mohammed V Stadium, Casablanca
Attendance: 7,829
Referee: Ahmad Heeralall (Mauritius)

Zambia	Comoros

GK	1	Willard Mwanza
RB	2	Mathews Banda
CB	6	Benson Sakala
CB	21	Dominic Chanda	(yellow card) 55'
LB	8	Lubambo Musonda
DM	25	Owen Tembo		(substituted off) 89'
CM	17	Kings Kangwa
CM	28	David Simukonda		(substituted off) 57'
RF	9	Lameck Banda		(substituted off) 70'
CF	20	Patson Daka
LF	10	Fashion Sakala (c)		(substituted off) 70'
Substitutes:
MF	12	Wilson Chisala		(substituted on) 57'
FW	19	Kennedy Musonda		(substituted on) 70'
MF	11	Joseph Sabobo		(substituted on) 70'
FW	7	Jack Lahne	(yellow card) 90+5'	(substituted on) 89'
Manager:
Moses Sichone

GK	16	Yannick Pandor
CB	4	Kenan Toibibou
CB	5	Ahmed Soilihi
CB	2	Ismaël Boura	(substituted off) 77'
RM	22	Saïd Bakari	(substituted off) 58'
CM	18	Yacine Bourhane	(substituted off) 62'
CM	28	Zaydou Youssouf
LM	3	Abdel-Hakim Abdallah	(substituted off) 58'
AM	10	Youssouf M'Changama (c)
CF	17	Myziane Maolida	(substituted off) 77'
CF	11	Rafiki Saïd
Substitutes:
MF	27	Rayan Lutin	(substituted on) 58'
DF	8	Yannis Kari	(substituted on) 58'
MF	25	Idris Mohamed	(substituted on) 62'
FW	7	Faïz Selemani	(substituted on) 77'
MF	14	Rémy Vita	(substituted on) 77'
Manager:
(Canada) Stefano Cusin

=== Morocco vs Mali ===
26 December 2025
21:00

Morocco	1–1	Mali
Brahim 45+5' (pen.)	Report	Sinayoko 64' (pen.)

Prince Moulay Abdellah Stadium, Rabat
Attendance: 63,844
Referee: Abdou Mefire (Cameroon)

Morocco	Mali

GK	1	Yassine Bounou (c)
RB	3	Noussair Mazraoui
CB	18	Jawad El Yamiq
CB	5	Nayef Aguerd	(yellow card) 52'
LB	26	Anass Salah-Eddine
DM	4	Sofyan Amrabat		(substituted off) 82'
RM	10	Brahim Díaz		(substituted off) 71'
CM	24	Neil El Aynaoui
CM	8	Azzedine Ounahi		(substituted off) 71'
LM	11	Ismael Saibari		(substituted off) 82'
CF	20	Ayoub El Kaabi		(substituted off) 70'
Substitutes:
FW	19	Youssef En-Nesyri		(substituted on) 70'
FW	17	Abde Ezzalzouli		(substituted on) 71'
MF	23	Bilal El Khannouss		(substituted on) 71'
FW	9	Soufiane Rahimi		(substituted on) 82'
FW	13	Eliesse Ben Seghir		(substituted on) 82'
Manager:
Walid Regragui

GK	16	Djigui Diarra	(yellow card) 82'
RB	26	Woyo Coulibaly	(yellow card) 51'
CB	5	Abdoulaye Diaby	(yellow card) 45+5'
CB	25	Ousmane Camara	(yellow card) 22'
LB	28	Nathan Gassama
RM	20	Mamadou Sangaré		(substituted off) 90+1'
CM	11	Lassana Coulibaly
CM	23	Aliou Dieng
LM	8	Mamadou Doumbia	(yellow card) 49'	(substituted off) 90+1'
AM	10	Yves Bissouma (c)		(substituted off) 57'
CF	17	Lassine Sinayoko	(yellow card) 63'	(substituted off) 76'
Substitutes:
FW	21	Gaoussou Diarra		(substituted on) 57'
FW	9	El Bilal Touré		(substituted on) 76'
FW	7	Dorgeles Nene	(yellow card) 90+7'	(substituted on) 90+1'
MF	19	Kamory Doumbia	(yellow card) 90+2'	(substituted on) 90+1'
Manager:
(Belgium) Tom Saintfiet

=== Zambia vs Morocco ===
29 December 2025
20:00

Zambia	0–3	Morocco
	Report	El Kaabi 9', 50'; Brahim 27'

Prince Moulay Abdellah Stadium, Rabat
Attendance: 62,532
Referee: Issa Sy (Senegal)

Zambia	Morocco

GK	1	Willard Mwanza
RB	2	Mathews Banda		(substituted off) 63'
CB	14	Kabaso Chongo	(yellow card) 39'	(substituted off) 46'
CB	21	Dominic Chanda
LB	22	David Hamansenya	(yellow card) 85'
CM	6	Benson Sakala
CM	26	Joseph Liteta		(substituted off) 46'
RW	8	Lubambo Musonda (c)
AM	5	Miguel Chaiwa	(yellow card) 29'
LW	17	Kings Kangwa	(red card) 90+5'	(substituted off) 79'
CF	20	Patson Daka		(substituted off) 79'
Substitutes:
FW	27	Elia Mandanji	(yellow card) 55'	(substituted on) 46'
FW	9	Lameck Banda		(substituted on) 46'
MF	11	Joseph Sabobo		(substituted on) 63'
MF	12	Wilson Chisala		(substituted on) 79'
MF	15	Given Kalusa		(substituted on) 79'
Manager:
Moses Sichone

GK	1	Yassine Bounou (c)
RB	15	Mohamed Chibi
CB	5	Nayef Aguerd
LB	25	Adam Masina
LB	3	Noussair Mazraoui		(substituted off) 64'
CM	24	Neil El Aynaoui
CM	8	Azzedine Ounahi	(yellow card) 90+3'
RW	10	Brahim Díaz		(substituted off) 64'
AM	11	Ismael Saibari		(substituted off) 64'
LW	17	Abde Ezzalzouli		(substituted off) 74'
CF	20	Ayoub El Kaabi		(substituted off) 74'
Substitutes:
FW	13	Eliesse Ben Seghir		(substituted on) 64'
FW	16	Ilias Akhomach		(substituted on) 64'
DF	2	Achraf Hakimi		(substituted on) 64'
FW	21	Chemsdine Talbi		(substituted on) 74'
FW	19	Youssef En-Nesyri		(substituted on) 74'
Manager:
Walid Regragui

=== Comoros vs Mali ===
29 December 2025
20:00

Comoros	0–0	Mali
	Report

Mohammed V Stadium, Casablanca
Attendance: 8,842
Referee: Mahamat Alhadji Allaou (Chad)

Comoros	Mali

GK	16	Yannick Pandor (c)
CB	4	Kenan Toibibou	(yellow card) 34'
CB	5	Ahmed Soilihi		(substituted off) 57'
CB	8	Yannis Kari
RWB	15	Benjaloud Youssouf		(substituted off) 84'
LWB	3	Abdel-Hakim Abdallah
CM	7	Faïz Selemani
CM	28	Zaydou Youssouf		(substituted off) 72'
CM	18	Yacine Bourhane		(substituted off) 72'
CF	17	Myziane Maolida		(substituted off) 58'
CF	11	Rafiki Saïd
Substitutes:
DF	2	Ismaël Boura	(yellow card) 79'	(substituted on) 57'
FW	21	El Fardou Ben Nabouhane	(yellow card) 90+1'	(substituted on) 58'
MF	6	Iyad Mohamed		(substituted on) 72'
MF	10	Youssouf M'Changama		(substituted on) 72'
DF	22	Saïd Bakari		(substituted on) 84'
Manager:
(Canada) Stefano Cusin

GK	16	Djigui Diarra
RB	13	Fodé Doucouré
CB	5	Abdoulaye Diaby
CB	25	Ousmane Camara
LB	28	Nathan Gassama
CM	12	Mohamed Camara	(yellow card) 47'	(substituted off) 70'
CM	10	Yves Bissouma (c)		(substituted off) 63'
RW	20	Mamadou Sangaré		(substituted off) 83'
AM	19	Kamory Doumbia
LW	7	Dorgeles Nene		(substituted off) 70'
CF	17	Lassine Sinayoko		(substituted off) 83'
Substitutes:
FW	18	Mamadou Doumbia		(substituted on) 63'
MF	4	Amadou Haidara	(red card) 88'	(substituted on) 70'
FW	21	Gaoussou Diarra		(substituted on) 70'
MF	11	Lassana Coulibaly		(substituted on) 83'
FW	14	Mamadou Camara		(substituted on) 83'
Manager:
(Belgium) Tom Saintfiet
