= 2025 Africa Cup of Nations final =

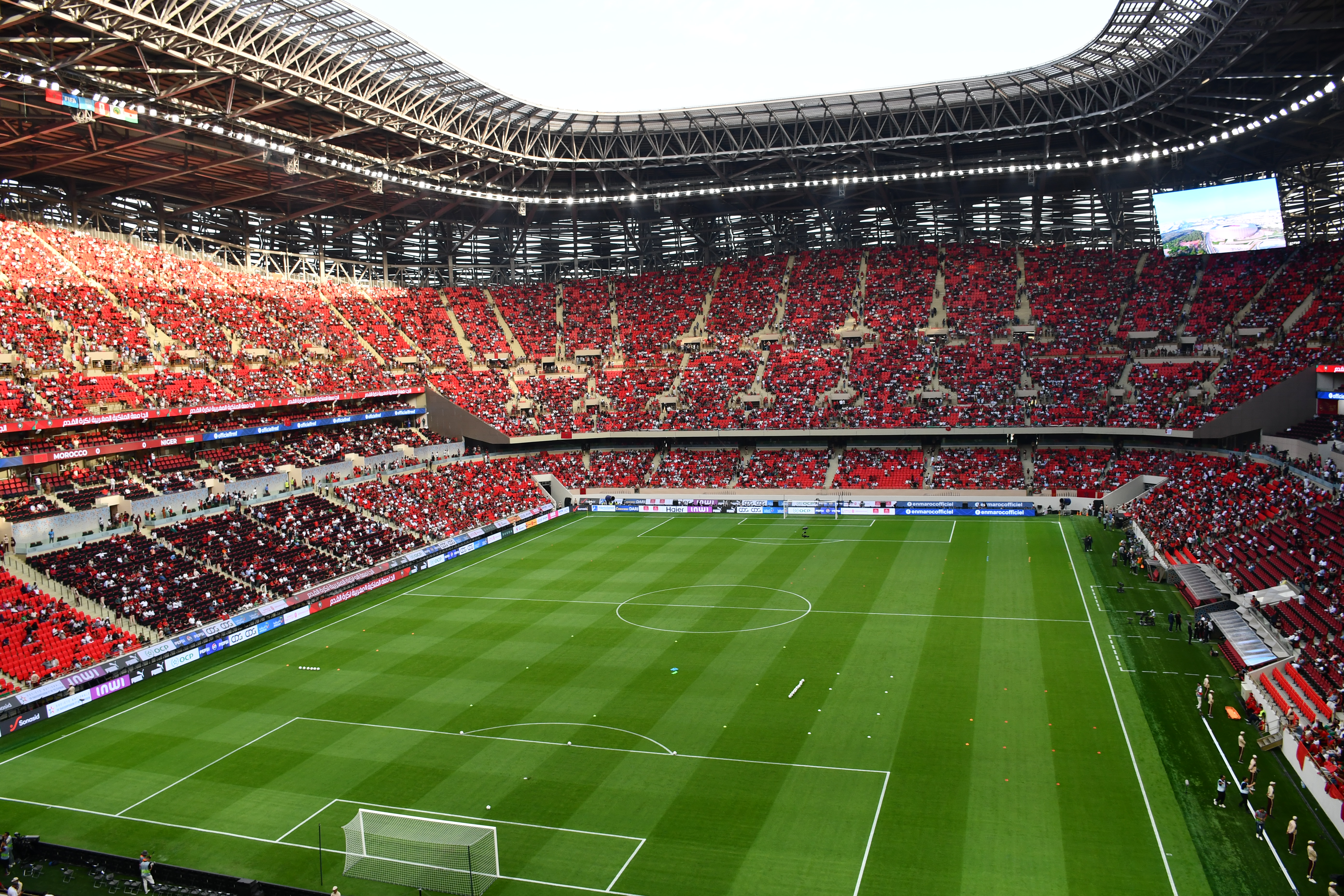
- Prince Moulay Abdellah Stadium hosted the match.
- Event: 2025 Africa Cup of Nations
Senegal	Morocco
0	3
- Awarded (Note: The final match originally finished 1–0 for Senegal after extra time. On 17 March 2026, the CAF Appeal Board ruled that, per articles 82 and 84 of the competition regulations, when Senegal left the field and repeatedly refused to return from their dressing room, they had forfeited the game; the rules for forfeited games deem that the match, and the Championship, be awarded as a 3–0 win for Morocco.)
- Date: 18 January 2026
- Venue: Prince Moulay Abdellah Stadium, Rabat
- Man of the Match: Pape Gueye (Senegal)
- Referee: Jean-Jacques Ndala (DR Congo)
- Attendance: 66,526
- Weather: Partly cloudy night 8 °C (46 °F); 93% humidity

The 2025 Africa Cup of Nations final was a football match played on 18 January 2026 at the Prince Moulay Abdellah Stadium in Rabat, Morocco. It determined the winners of the 2025 Africa Cup of Nations (AFCON), the 35th edition of the biennial African tournament organised by the Confederation of African Football (CAF), and was contested between Senegal and hosts Morocco.

The match was marred by controversies, most notably Senegal's decision to walk off the field in protest at a disallowed goal and detrimental VAR decision in stoppage time. Senegal later returned to the pitch, and played out the match, winning 1–0 after extra time. The walk-off and subsequent fan violence were described as "unacceptable" by FIFA president Gianni Infantino, and drew legal action from the Royal Moroccan Football Federation as well as disciplinary investigations by the CAF.

On 17 March 2026, the CAF Appeal Board ruled that, when Senegal left the field and repeatedly refused to return from their dressing room, they had forfeited the game; per the rules for forfeited games, the match was deemed a 3–0 win for Morocco. The following day, the Senegalese Football Federation announced it would appeal the decision to the Court of Arbitration for Sport.

== Venue ==
The Prince Moulay Abdellah Stadium is a football stadium in Rabat, Morocco, with a seating capacity of 69,500. Opened on 5 September 2025, it is the home stadium of the Morocco national football team. It is part of a larger sports complex that includes an athletics track and field stadium, the indoor Salle Moulay Abdellah arena, and an Olympic-size swimming pool. It is one of the largest stadiums in Morocco.

== Match officials ==
CAF announced the full list of referees for the match on 18 January 2026, with referee Jean-Jacques Ndala of the Democratic Republic of the Congo being the main referee. He was assisted on the lines by Guylain Bongele Ngila and Gradel Mwanya Mbilizi, also from DR Congo. The third assistant referee (reserve) was Styven Moutsassi of the Republic of the Congo. The other officials were South African Abongile Tom as fourth referee, Pierre Atcho of Gabon as video assistant referee (VAR), and two officials as assistant video assistant referee (AVAR): Letticia Viana of Eswatini and Stephen Yiembé of Kenya.

== Route to the final ==
=== Senegal ===
Senegal results
Round	Opponent	Result
GS	Botswana	3–0
GS	DR Congo	1–1
GS	Benin	3–0
R16	Sudan	3–1
QF	Mali	1–0
SF	Egypt	1–0

Senegal's national football team (nicknamed "Les Lions") first burst onto the international scene when they qualified for the 2002 World Cup and defeated France in their opening match, afterwards reaching the quarterfinals. That same year they reached the AFCON final but lost to Cameroon on penalties. Senegal next qualified for the World Cup in 2018, while their performance in the 2019 AFCON where they lost 1–0 to Algeria in the final cemented their reputation as one of Africa's top sides. In 2021, propelled by Sadio Mané, Senegal won their first AFCON title by beating Egypt on penalties in the final. Prior to the 2025 AFCON Paddy Power gave Senegal odds of 13/2 to win the tournament.

In the group stage Senegal topped Group D by goal difference, after a 3–0 win against Botswana with two goals from Nicolas Jackson, a 1–1 draw against second-placed DR Congo, and a 3–0 win against Benin despite captain Kalidou Koulibaly being shown a red card in the second half. Senegal faced Sudan in the round of 16 who they beat 3–1 after going a goal down thanks to two goals by Pape Gueye before half time. In the quarter-finals, Senegal beat Mali 1–0 due to a goal from Iliman Ndiaye and a red card for Malian midfielder Yves Bissouma. Senegal faced Egypt in the semi-finals, a rematch of the 2021 final, which pitted former Liverpool teammates Sadio Mané and Mohamed Salah against one another. Senegal largely controlled the game, with a 78th-minute goal from Mané sending them through to the final.

=== Morocco ===
Morocco results
Round	Opponent	Result
GS	Comoros	2–0
GS	Mali	1–1
GS	Zambia	3–0
R16	Tanzania	1–0
QF	Cameroon	2–0
SF	Nigeria	0–0 (a.e.t.) (4–2 p)

Morocco national football team (nicknamed the "Atlas Lions") were the tournament's hosts, and had last won the AFCON back in 1976. Their qualification for the 2018 World Cup was their first in 20 years. In the 2022 World Cup, Morocco enjoyed pan-Arab and pan-African support as they embarked on the deepest run ever made by an African team in the World Cup, beating the likes of Spain, Portugal, and Belgium on the way, before being knocked out in the semifinals and ultimately coming 4th. Prior to the 2025 AFCON, Sky Bet gave Morocco odds of 11/4 to win the tournament.

In the group stage, Morocco comfortably topped Group A following a 2–0 win against Comoros, a 1–1 draw against Mali with both goals coming from penalties, and a 3–0 win against Zambia with two goals from Ayoub El Kaabi. Brahim Díaz scored three goals throughout the group stage while key player Achraf Hakimi returned from injury towards the end. Morocco faced Tanzania in the round of 16 which ended in a 1–0 win thanks to a Díaz goal coming from a Hakimi assist. Morocco next came up against Cameroon in the quarter-finals, which saw Díaz score for a fifth game in a row in a clinical 2–0 win despite Morocco taking only three shots. Morocco faced Nigeria in the semi-finals, which proved a cagey affair as the game remained goalless after 120 minutes. In the subsequent penalty shootout goalkeeper Yassine Bounou saved two penalties to send Morocco through to the final.

== Match ==
=== Summary ===
The score remained level at 0–0 for most of normal time, with the match ending at a perfectly even 50–50 split in possession. The ball spent a slight majority of its time in Senegal's half, with Senegal holding possession through long defensive plays before ceding it to a Moroccan offense that repeatedly failed on short moves upfield. In the second half, Senegal dominated possession while Morocco tripled its number of shots. Moroccan goalkeeper Yassine Bounou made multiple key saves, while Senegal relied primarily on its defensive backs to keep the match goalless.

In the fifth minute of stoppage time, Senegal appeared to clinch victory from a corner kick. In the build-up to the play, Moroccan defender Achraf Hakimi was knocked to the ground while contesting the kick with Senegalese forward Abdoulaye Seck. Shortly after Hakimi fell, Seck met the incoming kick and headed it off the crossbar to set up a goal for Ismaïla Sarr. Referee Jean-Jacques Ndala made a controversial foul call against Seck, resulting in the goal being disallowed. Ndala was criticised for blowing his whistle before the play had ended, which prevented VAR from reviewing the validity of the goal.

A few minutes later, in the eighth minute of stoppage time, Senegalese defender El Hadji Malick Diouf held Moroccan forward Brahim Díaz in the penalty area, triggering a VAR review. Senegal was penalised with a penalty kick to be taken by Díaz. In protest at the decision, Senegalese players began shoving Ndala and opposing players, and head coach Pape Thiaw instructed his squad to leave the pitch. The match was suspended for approximately 14 minutes while Senegalese star Sadio Mané persuaded his teammates in the dressing room to return to the field, telling them: "We will play like men!" During the delay, Senegalese fans attempted a pitch invasion and clashed with Moroccan police and supporters, and fights broke out in the press box.

Mané's appeals eventually succeeded, and when the Senegalese players returned to the field, goalkeeper Édouard Mendy was shown a yellow card for delaying the game. Despite the caution, Mendy continued to stall by refusing to return to his goal. Brahim Díaz finally took the penalty kick nearly 21 minutes after the end of regulation, but his Panenka-style attempt was saved by Mendy, and normal time ended with the score still level at 0–0.

During extra time, Pape Gueye scored the only goal of the match for Senegal in the 94th minute, curling a left-footed shot high into the top-right corner from just inside the penalty area to give Senegal a 1–0 victory and its second Africa Cup of Nations title. Throughout the match, Moroccan ball boys and two Moroccan players, Achraf Hakimi and Ismael Saibari, had each attempted to discard the hand towel belonging to Senegalese goalkeeper Édouard Mendy, with substitute goalkeeper Yehvann Diouf repeatedly intervening to retrieve it. Diouf held the towel aloft alongside the trophy in his victory photograph.

=== Details ===
18 January 2026
20:00

Senegal	0–3 Awarded	Morocco
P. Gueye 94'	Report

Prince Moulay Abdellah Stadium, Rabat
Attendance: 66,526
Referee: Jean-Jacques Ndala (DR Congo)

Senegal	Morocco

GK	16	Édouard Mendy	(yellow card) 90+21'
RB	24	Antoine Mendy		(substituted off) 76'
CB	2	Mamadou Sarr	(yellow card) 113'
CB	19	Moussa Niakhaté
LB	25	El Hadji Malick Diouf	(yellow card) 90+10'	(substituted off) 106'
DM	5	Idrissa Gueye (c)		(substituted off) 112'
CM	8	Lamine Camara	(yellow card) 24'	(substituted off) 77'
CM	26	Pape Gueye
RF	13	Iliman Ndiaye		(substituted off) 77'
CF	11	Nicolas Jackson		(substituted off) 90+3'
LF	10	Sadio Mané
Substitutes:
DF	4	Abdoulaye Seck		(substituted on) 76'
FW	18	Ismaïla Sarr	(yellow card) 90+9'	(substituted on) 77'
FW	27	Ibrahim Mbaye		(substituted on) 77'
FW	12	Cherif Ndiaye		(substituted on) 90+3'
DF	14	Ismail Jakobs		(substituted on) 106'
MF	6	Pathé Ciss		(substituted on) 112'
Manager:
Pape Thiaw

GK	1	Yassine Bounou
RB	2	Achraf Hakimi (c)
CB	5	Nayef Aguerd
CB	25	Adam Masina		(substituted off) 89'
LB	3	Noussair Mazraoui		(substituted off) 98'
DM	24	Neil El Aynaoui
RM	10	Brahim Díaz		(substituted off) 98'
CM	23	Bilal El Khannouss		(substituted off) 80'
CM	11	Ismael Saibari		(substituted off) 90+4'
LM	17	Abde Ezzalzouli
CF	20	Ayoub El Kaabi		(substituted off) 80'
Substitutes:
FW	19	Youssef En-Nesyri	(yellow card) 112'	(substituted on) 80'
MF	14	Oussama Targhalline		(substituted on) 80'
DF	18	Jawad El Yamiq		(substituted on) 89'
DF	26	Anass Salah-Eddine	(yellow card) 90+21'	(substituted on) 90+4'
FW	16	Ilias Akhomach		(substituted on) 98'
FW	7	Hamza Igamane		(substituted on) 98'
Manager:
Walid Regragui

Man of the Match:
Pape Gueye (Senegal)

Assistant referees:
Guylain Bongele Ngila (DR Congo)
Gradel Mwanya Mbilizi (DR Congo)
Fourth official:
Abongile Tom (South Africa)
Reserve assistant referee:
Styven Moutsassi (Congo)
Video assistant referee:
Pierre Atcho (Gabon)
Assistant video assistant referees:
Letticia Viana (Eswatini)
Stephen Yiembé (Kenya)

Match rules

- 90 minutes
- 30 minutes of extra time if necessary
- Penalty shoot-out if scores still level
- Maximum of twelve named substitutes
- Maximum of five substitutions, with a sixth allowed in extra time
- Maximum of three substitution opportunities, with a fourth allowed in extra time

=== Statistics ===
Statistics	Senegal	Morocco
Goals scored	1	0
Total shots	14	21
Shots on target	7	4
Ball possession	50%	50%
Pass accuracy	81%	81%
Corner kicks	8	10
Saves	4	6
Fouls committed	25	17
Offsides	1	1
Yellow cards	5	2
Red cards	0	0

== Post-match ==
The AFCON championship trophy was presented to Senegal team captain Kalidou Koulibaly by CAF President Patrice Motsepe, Prince Moulay Rachid of Morocco, and FIFA President Gianni Infantino. The day after the match, the Royal Moroccan Football Federation announced that it would file a complaint against Senegal with FIFA and CAF, alleging that the events prior to the penalty kick "affected the normal development of the match and the performance of the players". The complaint is based on article 82 of the competition regulations, which states that "if a team refuses to play or leaves the field before the end of the match without the referee's authorisation, it must be considered the loser and definitively eliminated from the current competition".

On 28 January 2026, the CAF Disciplinary Board imposed fines and bans on both teams for misconduct during the final. Senegal's head coach Pape Thiaw received a five-match suspension, while Iliman Ndiaye and Ismaila Sarr were each banned for two matches, alongside heavy fines for the Senegalese Football Federation. Morocco were also sanctioned, with Achraf Hakimi and Ismael Saibari receiving suspensions and the Moroccan federation fined, with all penalties applying only to CAF competitions. However, Morocco's protest regarding alleged violations of articles 82 and 84 of the competition regulations was dismissed. On 3 February, the Royal Moroccan Football Federation announced it would appeal the sanctions and the dismissed protest.

== Reversal of result ==
On 17 March 2026, the CAF Appeal Board ruled that Senegal had forfeited the final through their actions in leaving the pitch, and had thus infringed Article 82; as a result, Article 84 became applicable, which states that any team that violates Article 82 will be permanently eliminated and will lose the match 3–0. As a result, Senegal were stripped of the title, with Morocco declared as Africa Cup of Nations champions. The Senegalese Football Federation denounced the decision as a "travesty" with "no legal foundation", and immediately announced its intention to appeal the decision to the Court of Arbitration for Sport, which they did on 25 March.

A former member of the CAF Appeal Board commented that "I know it does not have the power to change the on-field decision of a referee. I cannot understand how they came to this disgraceful decision", according to The Guardian. The Guardian's reporter called the referee's officiating "atrocious" (specifically his two decisions not to award Senegal a penalty, and not to declare Morocco the winners after Senegal's players abandoned the game), but nevertheless claimed that the game's result could not be overturned by a court. He pointed out a discrepancy between this decision and the one regarding the 2019 CAF Champions League final: that game was awarded by the referee to Espérance de Tunis after their opponents, Wydad AC, walked off the pitch for an hour; CAF's executive committee ordered the game to be replayed instead, but the CAS overturned this decision.

== See also ==
- 2025 Africa Cup of Nations knockout stage
