= Jean-Jacques Ndala =

DR Congolese football referee (born 1987)

Jean-Jacques Ndala Ngambo
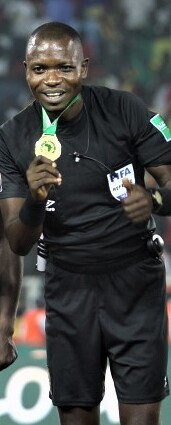
- Ndala after the 2021 Cup of Nations Final
- Full name: Jean-Jacques Ndala Ngambo
- Born: 14 June 1987 (age 39); Zaire (now DR Congo)

Domestic
| Years | League | Role |
| ??– | Linafoot | Referee |

International
| Years | League | Role |
| 2013– | FIFA listed | Referee |

Jean-Jacques Ndala Ngambo (born 14 June 1987) is a Congolese football referee, and a FIFA-listed international referee since 2013.

== Career ==
Ndala began his career in the Katanga Province Football League, and later ascended to the country's top division, the Linafoot.

He is a referee at CAF level tournaments, and has participated in four Africa Cup of Nations, first in the 2019 edition in Egypt, followed by the 2022 tournament in Cameroon, the 2024 Cup in the Ivory Coast, and in Morocco in 2025–2026, with his most advanced game being the final in Rabat in January 2026. He has also overseen games in the CAF qualification for the 2022 FIFA World Cup.

In 2021, Ndala refereed the December CAF Super Cup between Al Ahly SC and Raja CA in Qatar. Two years later, in May 2023, he led the first leg final of the 2022–23 CAF Confederation Cup between Young Africans S.C. and USM Alger in Dar es Salaam, Tanzania, and in November of that year, Ndala oversaw the second leg final of the 2023 African Football League between Mamelodi Sundowns F.C. and Wydad AC at the Loftus Versfeld Stadium in Pretoria, South Africa.

Ndala's FIFA career reached international level (beyond CAF) in 2019, when he was chosen as an official for the FIFA U-20 World Cup in Poland, where he led two group stage matches. He was pre-selected for the 2022 FIFA World Cup in October 2020, but he was not ultimately included in the final list. In April 2025, Ndala was named for the 2025 FIFA Club World Cup in the United States.

In January 2026, Ndala was appointed as a referee at the Africa Cup of Nations in Morocco. He oversaw two group stage games and was appointed for the 18 January final match, between Senegal and the locals Morocco at the Prince Moulay Abdellah Stadium in Rabat, in which he was heavily criticized due to several controversial refereeing decisions. (Note: The final match originally finished as a 1–0 win for Senegal after extra time. On 17 March 2026, the CAF Appeal Board ruled that Senegal had forfeited the match for temporarily refusing to play and leaving the pitch in protest of a refereeing decision. Pursuant to articles 82 and 84 of the competition regulations, the final was awarded as a 3–0 win for Morocco, thereby retroactively declaring them as 2025 Africa Cup of Nations champions and stripping Senegal of the title.)

== Selected record ==
2019 FIFA U-20 World Cup – Poland
| Date | Match | Result | Round | Ref |
|---|---|---|---|---|
| 27 May 2019 | Norway – New Zealand | 0–2 | Group stage | |
| 31 May 2019 | Saudi Arabia – Panama | 1–2 | Group stage | |
2025 Africa Cup of Nations – Morocco
| 21 December 2025 | Morocco – Comoros | 2–0 | Group stage | |
| 30 December 2025 | Tanzania – Tunisia | 1–1 | Group stage | |
| 18 January 2026 | Senegal – Morocco | 0–3 | Final | |
