= Brahim Díaz =

Morocco international footballer (born 1999)

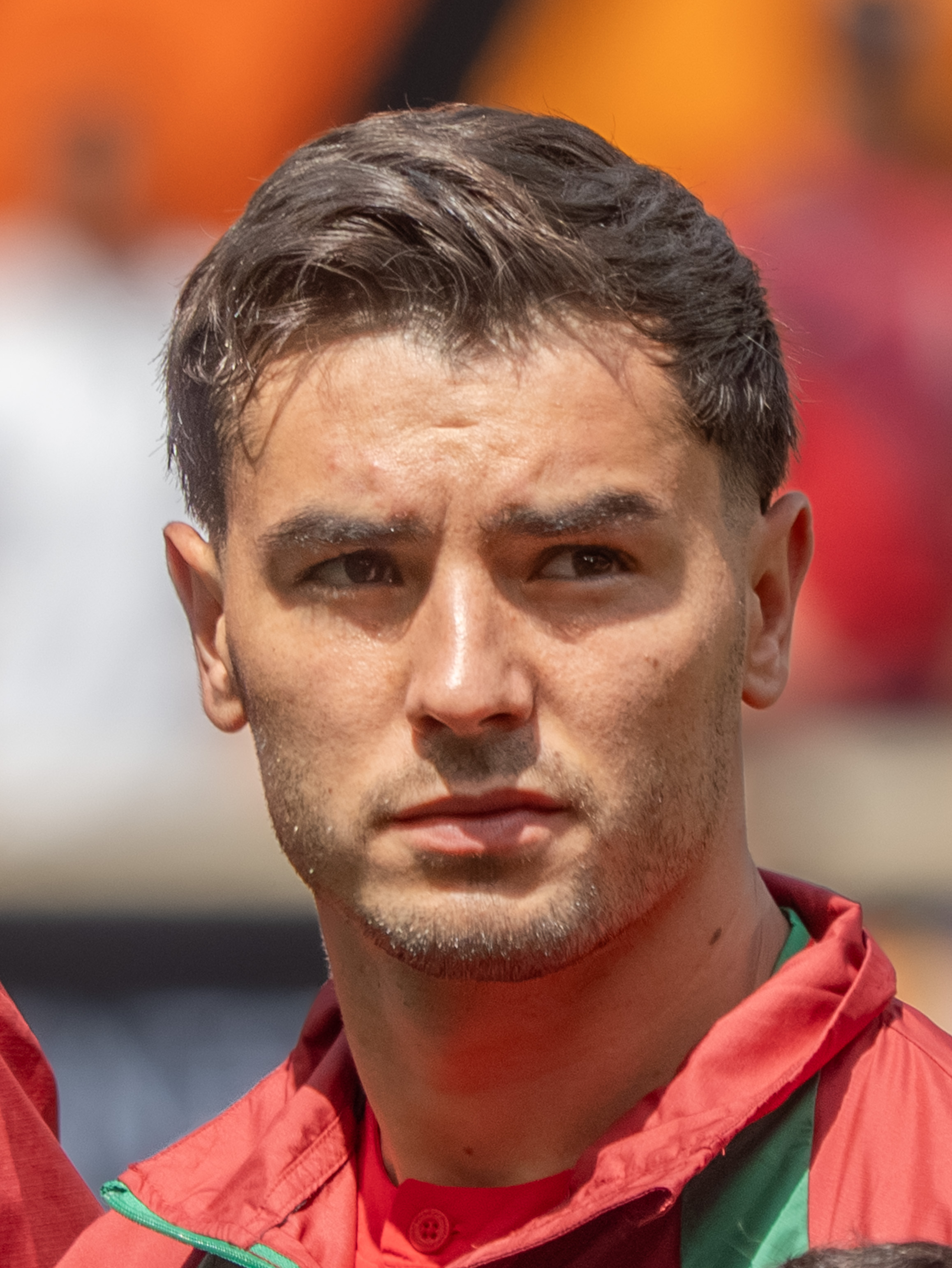
- Brahim with Morocco in 2026

Personal information
- Full name: Brahim Abdelkader Díaz
- Date of birth: 3 August 1999 (age 27)
- Place of birth: Málaga, Spain
- Height: 1.70 m (5 ft 7 in)
- Positions: Attacking midfielder; winger

Team information
- Current team: Real Madrid
- Number: 21

Youth career
- 2010–2015: Málaga
- 2015–2016: Manchester City

Senior career*
| Years | Team | Apps | (Gls) |
| 2016–2019 | Manchester City | 5 | (0) |
| 2019– | Real Madrid | 113 | (14) |
| 2020–2023 | → AC Milan (loan) | 91 | (13) |

International career^{‡}
| 2016–2017 | Spain U17 | 10 | (3) |
| 2016–2018 | Spain U19 | 10 | (1) |
| 2017–2021 | Spain U21 | 8 | (2) |
| 2021 | Spain | 1 | (1) |
| 2024– | Morocco | 34 | (15) |
Medal record
Men's football
Representing Morocco
Africa Cup of Nations
| Winner | 2025 Morocco |
Representing Spain
UEFA European Under-17 Championship
| Runner-up | 2016 Azerbaijan |
- * Club domestic league appearances and goals as of 22:02, 7 November 2026 (UTC) ‡ National team caps and goals as of 22:49, 5 October 2026 (UTC)

Brahim Abdelkader Díaz (Note: Arabic: إبراهيم عبد القادر) (born 3 August 1999), also known mononymously as Brahim, is a professional footballer who plays as an attacking midfielder or winger for La Liga club Real Madrid. Born in Spain, he plays for the Morocco national team. A versatile playmaker, he is known for his direct attacking style, explosiveness, and ambidextrous dribbling.

Brahim began his club career at his hometown club Málaga, before moving to Manchester City in 2015 at the age of 16. He had started to break through into the first team when he was signed by Real Madrid in 2019. After three successful seasons on loan at AC Milan, where he was a key part of their Serie A winning team of 2021–22, Brahim returned to Real Madrid in 2023 and became a consistent first team regular, winning La Liga and the Champions League in his first full season back in Spain.

Brahim initially represented Spain at youth level, before making his senior debut as well as scoring against Lithuania in 2021. However, Brahim would then decide to change his representative nationality to Morocco, the country of his father's heritage. After earning his first Morocco call-up in 2024, he featured in the squad that went on to win the 2025 Africa Cup of Nations on home soil, where he earned the Golden Boot and became the first player in the tournament's history to score in five consecutive matches. At the 2026 FIFA World Cup, Brahim recorded four assists to help Morocco reach the quarter-finals, becoming Africa's all-time World Cup assist leader in the process.

== Early and personal life ==
Brahim was born in Málaga, Spain to a Moroccan-Riffian father and a Spanish mother. He grew up in Málaga, but moved to Manchester at age 16 after signing with Manchester City's youth academy.

On 2 August 2026, Brahim married his long-time partner, Luz Méndez.

== Club career ==
=== Manchester City ===
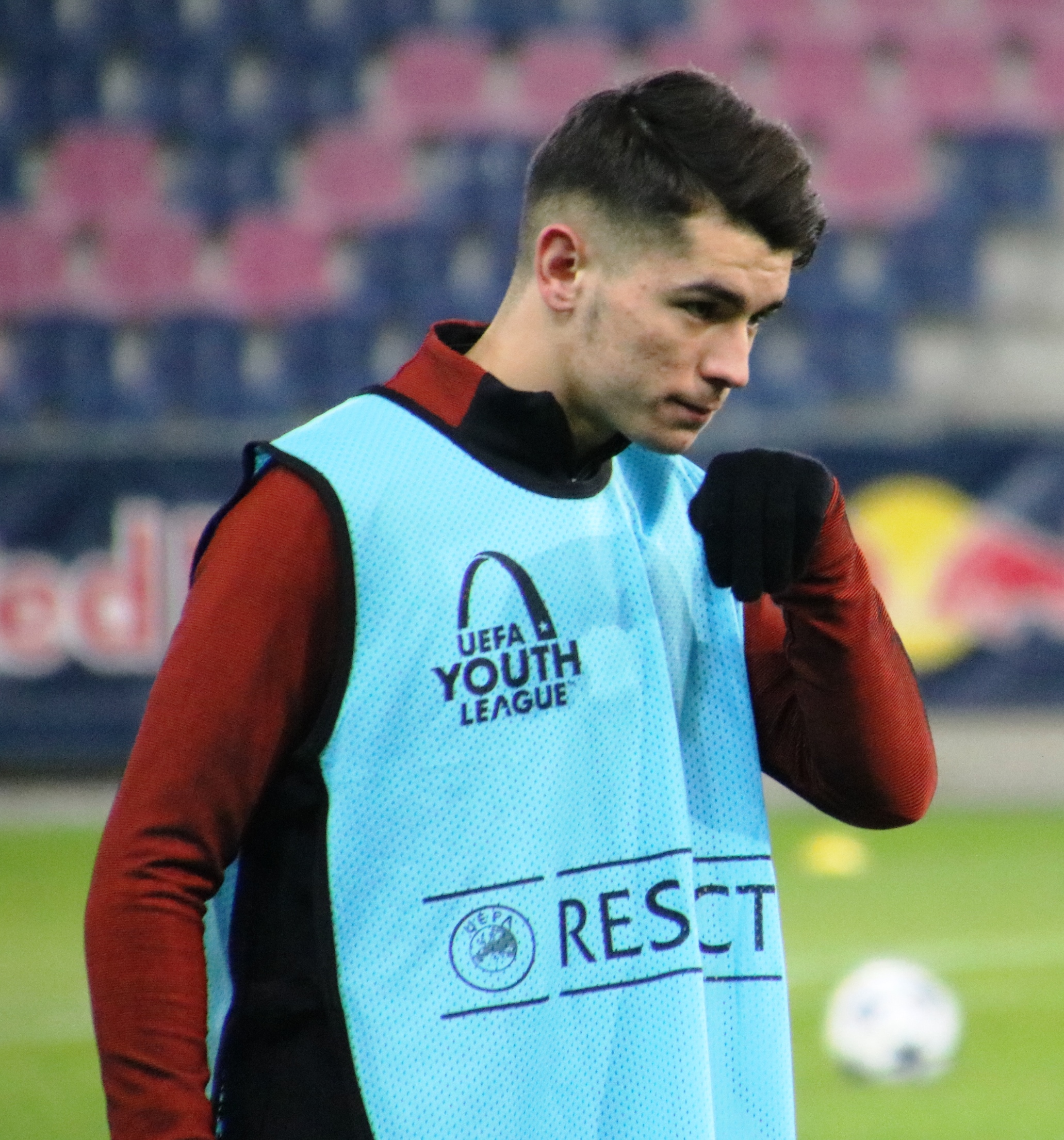
Brahim with Manchester City in 2017

Brahim began his club career at his hometown club Málaga, before moving to Manchester City in 2015 as a 16-year-old for an initial £200,000 fee. On 21 September 2016, Brahim made his first-team debut for City, coming on as an 80th-minute substitute to replace Kelechi Iheanacho in an EFL Cup tie against Swansea City. Five days later, he signed his first professional contract with City, for three years.

On 21 November 2017, Brahim made his Champions League debut against Feyenoord in a group stage match, coming on in injury time for Raheem Sterling. On 19 December 2017, Brahim made his first club start, playing for 88 minutes against Leicester City in the League Cup. He made his Premier League debut on 20 January 2018, in a 3–1 victory over Newcastle United. and on 13 May, he received a winner's medal after appearing sporadically in four more league games over the season.

On 5 August 2018, Brahim played the final 15 minutes in place of Phil Foden a 2–0 win over Chelsea in the 2018 FA Community Shield. Later that season, Brahim would score his first career goal for City, netting both times in a 2–0 win over Fulham on 1 November.

=== Real Madrid ===
Following intense transfer speculation and with his contract with Manchester City due to expire in June 2019, Brahim joined Real Madrid on 6 January, for a transfer fee of £15.5 million (€17 million). Brahim put pen to paper on a 6-year deal running through 2025 with add-ons which could potentially see the value of the transfer rise to £22 million (€24 million). The transfer also included clauses which stipulated a 15 percent sell-on fee to be received by City, rising all the way up to 40 percent should he be sold to Manchester United.

==== 2018–20: First season in Spain and La Liga title ====
He made his debut on 9 January 2019, coming on as a substitute in a 3–0 victory over Leganés in the Copa del Rey. His league debut came four days later, when he again came in as a substitute in a 2–1 win over Real Betis. He scored his first goal on 12 May 2019, in a 1–3 defeat at Real Sociedad.

He made six appearances during the league season, as Real Madrid won the 2019–20 La Liga.

==== 2020–23: Loan to AC Milan and Serie A champion ====
On 4 September 2020, Real Madrid announced that Brahim would be loaned out to AC Milan for the duration of the 2020–21 season. On 27 September, he scored his first goal in a 2–0 away win over Crotone. On 9 May 2021, he scored a goal in a 3–0 away win over Juventus. After the 2020–21 season, he was loaned for another two years to AC Milan with a buyout option. On 15 September 2021, he scored his first Champions League goal against Liverpool in a 3–2 defeat in the 2021–22 Champions League group stage.

On 8 October 2022, Brahim scored his second goal against Juventus in a league game, finishing after a run to double the advantage as he seized a loose pass and knocked it around the Juventus defender Leonardo Bonucci to get through on goal, and then finished past goalkeeper Wojciech Szczęsny.

On 14 February 2023, he scored the only goal in a 1–0 victory over Tottenham Hotspur in the Champions League round of 16.

==== 2023–present: Return to Real Madrid ====
On 10 June 2023, Real Madrid announced Brahim's return from a three-season loan at AC Milan, and upon his return, he signed a contract extension with the club until June 2027, succeeding the departing Marco Asensio. On 27 September, he scored his first goal since his return, contributing to a 2–0 triumph over Las Palmas during a La Liga game at the Santiago Bernabéu. He was subsequently awarded the Man of the Match title. On 8 November, he scored his first Champions League goal for Real Madrid, by netting the opener in a 3–0 victory over Braga, which secured his club's qualification to the knockout phase.

On 6 January 2024, Brahim scored his first Copa del Rey goal in a match against Arandina, contributing to a 3–1 victory for Real Madrid. In the Supercopa de España semi-final on 10 January at KSU Stadium in Riyadh, Brahim clinched a dramatic victory for Real Madrid over Atlético Madrid with a last-minute goal, making the score 5–3 in a match that extended into extra time. His decisive goal came as Atlético's goalkeeper Jan Oblak advanced for a corner, staying in Real Madrid's half after a throw-in, allowing Brahim to score from just inside the halfway line and secure Real Madrid's place in the final.

A month later, on 13 February, in the Champions League round of 16 first leg match, Brahim scored the only goal for Real Madrid against RB Leipzig at the Red Bull Arena, securing a 1–0 victory with a left-footed curler past Leipzig goalkeeper Péter Gulácsi after skilfully evading multiple defenders, earning him the Man of the Match award in a compound accomplishment.

On 11 May 2024, Brahim scored a brace in a 4–0 victory over Granada. A month later, he won the Champions League with his club following a 2–0 victory over Borussia Dortmund in the final, becoming the third Moroccan to achieve this feat after Achraf Hakimi and Hakim Ziyech.

== International career ==
=== Spain ===
Brahim was a youth international for Spain, and made his first appearances at age 16, where he received praise for his performances for Spain U17 in the 2016 UEFA European Under-17 Championship. Due to the isolation of some national team players following the positive COVID-19 test of Sergio Busquets, Spain's under-21 squad were called up for the international friendly match against Lithuania on 8 June 2021. He made his senior debut and only cap for the team in the match and scored the second goal in a 4–0 victory.

=== Morocco ===
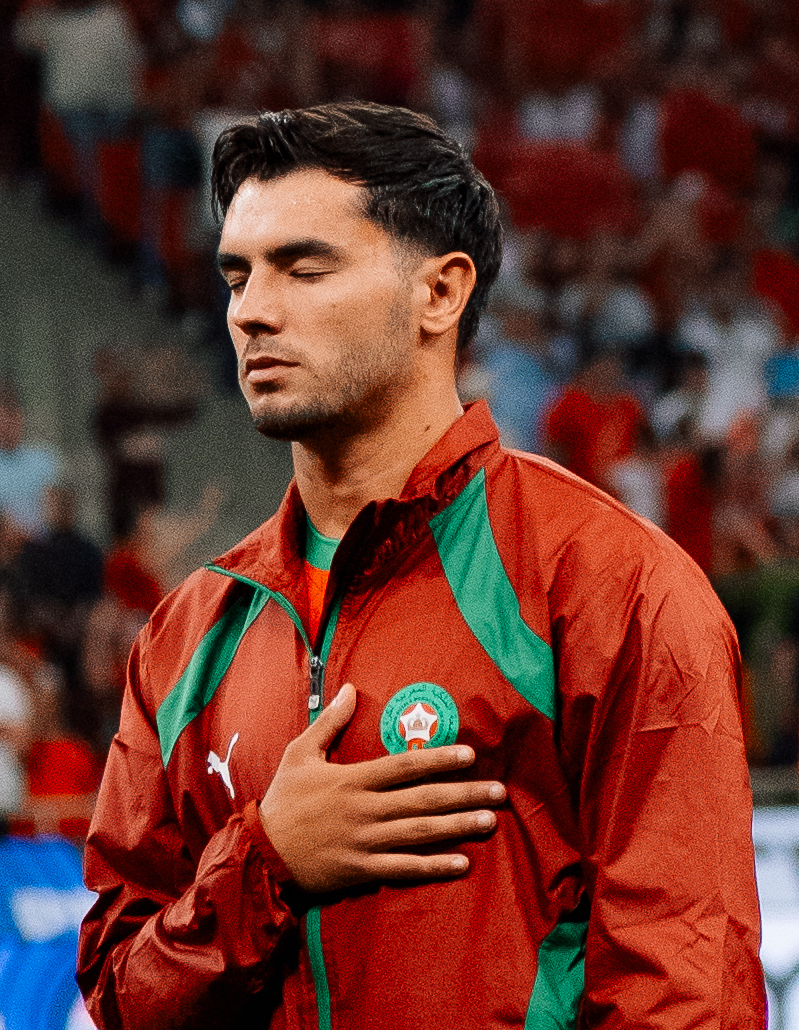
Brahim with Morocco in a match against Niger in 2025

In January 2023, it was rumoured that Brahim planned to switch allegiances to the Morocco national team. In October, Marca reported that he had decided to represent Morocco, with some administrative details related to change in nationality being resolved. However, he was not called up by coach Walid Regragui for the 2023 Africa Cup of Nations due to a pre-established agreement.

On 10 March 2024, Marca reported that Brahim had officially informed the Royal Moroccan Football Federation that he would be switching his allegiance to their national team. On 13 March, Brahim was called up by the Morocco coach Walid Regragui for the matches against Angola and Mauritania. He made his debut on 22 March in a 1–0 victory against Angola. On 6 September, Brahim scored his first goal for Morocco in a 4–1 victory against Gabon during the 2025 Africa Cup of Nations qualification. On 15 November, he scored his first brace for Morocco in a 5–1 qualification win over Gabon. Three days later, Brahim scored his first hat-trick in a 7–0 victory against Lesotho during the final match of the African qualifications.

In October 2025, Brahim's Morocco broke the world record for the longest winning streak in international football, surpassing Spain's previous mark of 15 consecutive victories. With a 1–0 win over Congo in Rabat, they extended their unbeaten run to 16. Their winning streak ultimately reached 19 consecutive wins before coming to an end during the 2025 AFCON with a 1–1 draw against Mali in the second group stage match.

Brahim was named in the Morocco squad for the 2025 Africa Cup of Nations on home soil, where he scored the tournament's opening goal in a 2–0 victory over Comoros, earning the Man of the Match award. He scored in the subsequent group matches against Mali and Zambia becoming the first Moroccan to score in every group stage match since Ahmed Faras in 1976. On 4 January 2026, he scored the only goal against Tanzania in the round of 16, becoming the first Moroccan player ever to score four goals in four consecutive AFCON matches, and was named Man of the Match. On 18 January, he missed a panenka penalty in the last minute of stoppage time in the AFCON final against Senegal, after a 15-minute protest by the Senegalese team against the referee's decision in which the team left the field. The match ended in a 1–0 defeat after extra time. However, he concluded the tournament as top scorer with five goals in total. CAF later overturned the on-field result due to Senegal's forfeit. On 17 March, the CAF Appeal Board ruled that Senegal had forfeited the final through their temporary walk-off (deemed a breach of regulations, including Article 84 of the AFCON rules), awarding Morocco a 3–0 victory on default and declaring the Atlas Lions the official champions of the 2025 Africa Cup of Nations.

On 26 May 2026, Brahim was selected in the 26-man squad for the 2026 FIFA World Cup. On 4 July, Brahim provided two assists as Morocco defeated Canada 3–0 in the Round of 16 to progress to the quarter-finals, becoming the first African player to register four assists in a single FIFA World Cup while also setting the all-time record for assists by an African player in the competition.

== Style of play ==
Brahim playing for Morocco at the 2026 FIFA World Cup

Brahim is an ambidextrous and technically gifted attacking midfielder, known for his dribbling ability, agility, and playmaking ability. He prefers to play as a number 10, but can also play as a winger on either flank.

== Career statistics ==
=== Club ===
As of match played 7 November 2026

Appearances and goals by club, season and competition
| Club | Season | League | | | National cup (Note: Includes FA Cup, Copa del Rey, Coppa Italia) | | League cup (Note: Includes EFL Cup) | | Europe | | Other | | Total | |
| Club | Season | Division | Apps | Goals | Apps | Goals | Apps | Goals | Apps | Goals | Apps | Goals | Apps | Goals |
|---|---|---|---|---|---|---|---|---|---|---|---|---|---|---|
| Manchester City | 2016–17 | Premier League | 0 | 0 | 0 | 0 | 1 | 0 | 0 | 0 | — | | 1 | 0 |
| Manchester City | 2017–18 | Premier League | 5 | 0 | 1 | 0 | 1 | 0 | 3 (Note: Appearance(s) in UEFA Champions League) | 0 | — | | 10 | 0 |
| Manchester City | 2018–19 | Premier League | 0 | 0 | 0 | 0 | 3 | 2 | 0 | 0 | 1 (Note: Appearance in FA Community Shield) | 0 | 4 | 2 |
| Manchester City | Total | | 5 | 0 | 1 | 0 | 5 | 2 | 3 | 0 | 1 | 0 | 15 | 2 |
| Real Madrid | 2018–19 | La Liga | 9 | 1 | 2 | 0 | — | | 0 | 0 | — | | 11 | 1 |
| Real Madrid | 2019–20 | La Liga | 6 | 0 | 3 | 1 | — | | 1 | 0 | 0 | 0 | 10 | 1 |
| Real Madrid | 2023–24 | La Liga | 31 | 8 | 2 | 1 | — | | 9 | 2 | 2 (Note: Appearances in Supercopa de España) | 1 | 44 | 12 |
| Real Madrid | 2024–25 | La Liga | 31 | 4 | 6 | 0 | — | | 11 | 2 | 8 (Note: Two appearances in Supercopa de España, one appearance in UEFA Super Cup, one appearance in FIFA Intercontinental Cup, four appearances in FIFA Club World Cup) | 0 | 56 | 6 |
| Real Madrid | 2025–26 | La Liga | 30 | 1 | 0 | 0 | — | | 12 | 1 | 0 | 0 | 42 | 2 |
| Real Madrid | 2026–27 | La Liga | 6 | 0 | 0 | 0 | — | | 3 | 0 | 0 | 0 | 9 | 0 |
| Real Madrid | Total | | 113 | 14 | 13 | 2 | — | | 36 | 5 | 10 | 1 | 172 | 22 |
| AC Milan (loan) | 2020–21 | Serie A | 27 | 4 | 2 | 0 | — | | 10 (Note: Appearances in UEFA Europa League) | 3 | — | | 39 | 7 |
| AC Milan (loan) | 2021–22 | Serie A | 31 | 3 | 4 | 0 | — | | 5 | 1 | — | | 40 | 4 |
| AC Milan (loan) | 2022–23 | Serie A | 33 | 6 | 1 | 0 | — | | 10 | 1 | 1 (Note: Appearance in Supercoppa Italiana) | 0 | 45 | 7 |
| AC Milan (loan) | Total | | 91 | 13 | 7 | 0 | — | | 25 | 5 | 1 | 0 | 124 | 18 |
| Career total | | | 209 | 27 | 21 | 2 | 5 | 2 | 64 | 10 | 12 | 1 | 311 | 42 |

=== International ===
As of match played 4 October 2026

Appearances and goals by national team and year
| National team | Year | Apps | Goals |
|---|---|---|---|
| Spain | 2021 | 1 | 1 |
| Spain | Total | 1 | 1 |
| Morocco | 2024 | 8 | 7 |
| Morocco | 2025 | 10 | 4 |
| Morocco | 2026 | 16 | 4 |
| Morocco | Total | 34 | 15 |
| Career total | | 35 | 16 |

As of match played 29 September 2026
Spain score listed first, score column indicates score after each Brahim goal

List of Spain international goals scored by Brahim
| No. | Date | Venue | Cap | Opponent | Score | Result | Competition |
|---|---|---|---|---|---|---|---|
| 1 | 8 June 2021 | Butarque Stadium, Leganés, Spain | 1 | Lithuania | 2–0 | 4–0 | Friendly |

Morocco score listed first, score column indicates score after each Brahim goal

List of Morocco international goals scored by Brahim
| No. | Date | Venue | Cap | Opponent | Score | Result | Competition |
|---|---|---|---|---|---|---|---|
| 1 | 6 September 2024 | Adrar Stadium, Agadir, Morocco | 5 | Gabon | 3–1 | 4–1 | 2025 Africa Cup of Nations qualification |
| 2 | 9 September 2024 | Adrar Stadium, Agadir, Morocco | 6 | Lesotho | 1–0 | 1–0 | 2025 Africa Cup of Nations qualification |
| 3 | 15 November 2024 | Franceville Stadium, Franceville, Gabon | 7 | Gabon | 2–1 | 5–1 | 2025 Africa Cup of Nations qualification |
| 4 | 15 November 2024 | Franceville Stadium, Franceville, Gabon | 7 | Gabon | 3–1 | 5–1 | 2025 Africa Cup of Nations qualification |
| 5 | 18 November 2024 | Honor Stadium, Oujda, Morocco | 8 | Lesotho | 1–0 | 7–0 | 2025 Africa Cup of Nations qualification |
| 6 | 18 November 2024 | Honor Stadium, Oujda, Morocco | 8 | Lesotho | 2–0 | 7–0 | 2025 Africa Cup of Nations qualification |
| 7 | 18 November 2024 | Honor Stadium, Oujda, Morocco | 8 | Lesotho | 4–0 | 7–0 | 2025 Africa Cup of Nations qualification |
| 8 | 25 March 2025 | Honor Stadium, Oujda, Morocco | 10 | Tanzania | 2–0 | 2–0 | 2026 FIFA World Cup qualification |
| 9 | 21 December 2025 | Prince Moulay Abdellah Stadium, Rabat, Morocco | 16 | Comoros | 1–0 | 2–0 | 2025 Africa Cup of Nations |
| 10 | 26 December 2025 | Prince Moulay Abdellah Stadium, Rabat, Morocco | 17 | Mali | 1–0 | 1–1 | 2025 Africa Cup of Nations |
| 11 | 29 December 2025 | Prince Moulay Abdellah Stadium, Rabat, Morocco | 18 | Zambia | 2–0 | 3–0 | 2025 Africa Cup of Nations |
| 12 | 4 January 2026 | Prince Moulay Abdellah Stadium, Rabat, Morocco | 19 | Tanzania | 1–0 | 1–0 | 2025 Africa Cup of Nations |
| 13 | 9 January 2026 | Prince Moulay Abdellah Stadium, Rabat, Morocco | 20 | Cameroon | 1–0 | 2–0 | 2025 Africa Cup of Nations |
| 14 | 7 June 2026 | Sports Illustrated Stadium, Harrison, United States | 26 | Norway | 1–0 | 1–1 | Friendly |
| 15 | 29 September 2026 | Free State Stadium, Bloemfontein, South Africa | 33 | Lesotho | 1–0 | 2–0 | 2027 Africa Cup of Nations qualification |

== Honours ==
Manchester City

- Premier League: 2017–18
- EFL Cup: 2017–18
- FA Community Shield: 2018

Real Madrid

- La Liga: 2019–20, 2023–24
- Supercopa de España: 2024
- UEFA Champions League: 2023–24
- UEFA Super Cup: 2024
- FIFA Intercontinental Cup: 2024

AC Milan

- Serie A: 2021–22

Spain U17

- UEFA European Under-17 Championship runner-up: 2016

Morocco

- Africa Cup of Nations: 2025

Individual

- Serie A Goal of the Month: October 2022
- Africa Cup of Nations qualifiers Top scorer: 2025
- Africa Cup of Nations Group Stage Best XI: 2025
- Africa Cup of Nations Golden Boot: 2025
- Africa Cup of Nations Team of the Tournament: 2025

Records

- First Moroccan to score four goals in four consecutive matches in an Africa Cup of Nations
- First Moroccan to score five goals in five consecutive matches in an Africa Cup of Nations
- African Player with the most Assists at a single FIFA World Cup: 4
- African Player with the most Assists in the FIFA World Cup: 4
