= George Mungwa =

Zambian football manager (died 2002)

Personal information
- Date of death: 10 March 2002
- Place of death: Lusaka, Zambia

Managerial career
- Years: Team
- 1996–1997: Zambia
- 1998: Zambia
- 2000: Zambia

George Mungwa (died 10 March 2002) was a Zambian football coach.

== Career ==
He served as national team manager in 1996–1997, 1998, and 2000, and also served as head of the Zambia Football Coaches Association.
