= Letticia Viana =

Swazi football referee

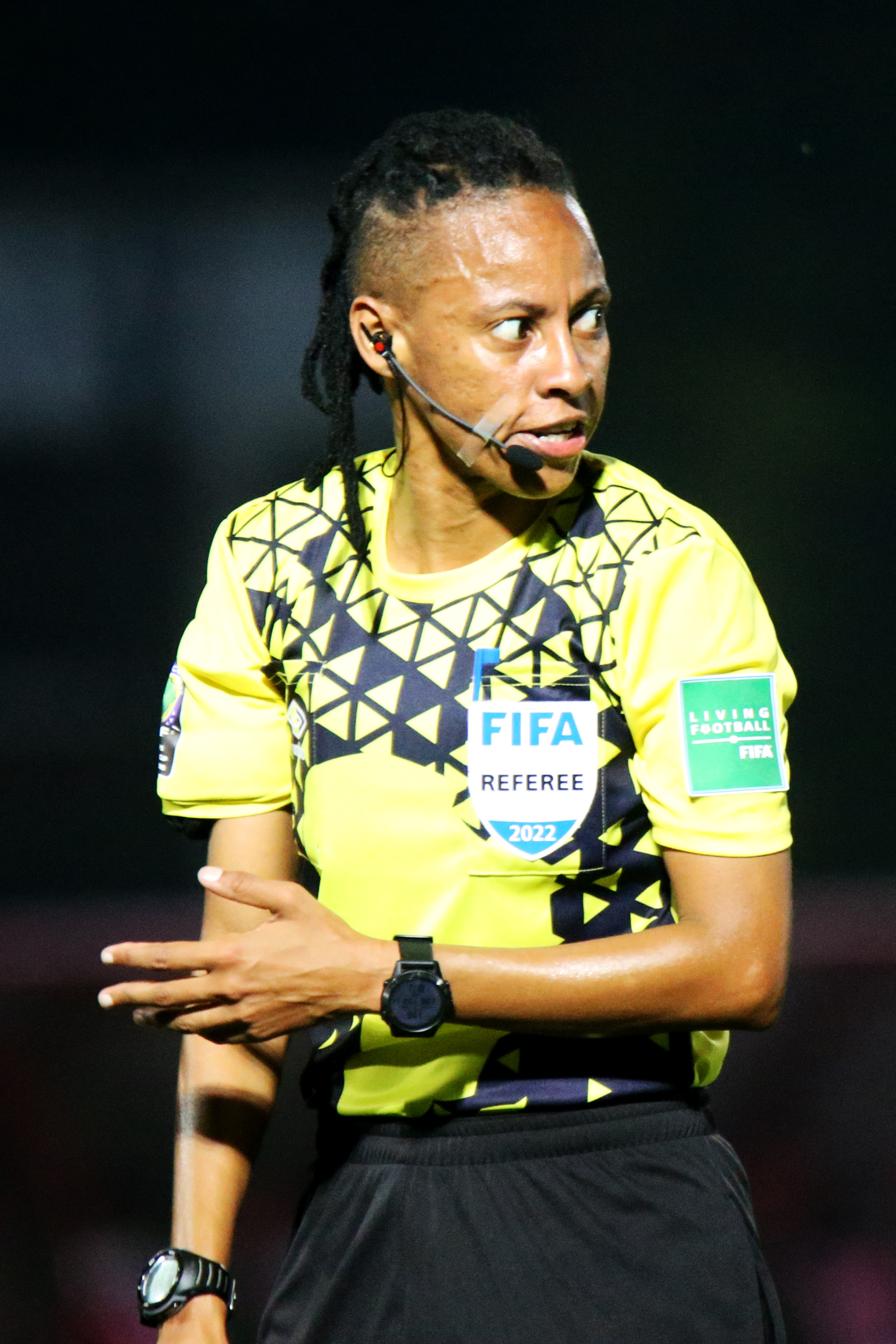
- Viana in 2022
- Full name: Letticia Antonella Viana
- Born: 1987 or 1988 (age 37–38); Eswatini

Domestic
Years	League	
2007–present	Premier League of Eswatini	

International
Years	League	Role
2015–present	FIFA listed	Referee; VAR official (since 2024)

Letticia Antonella Viana (born 1987 or 1988) is a Swazi association football referee, representing Eswatini as a FIFA-listed referee and VAR official since 2015 and 2024, respectively. Viana also works for the government of Eswatini as an assistant officer in the Ministry of Sports, Culture and Youth Affairs.

In January 2026, Viana was selected as one of the two assistant VAR officials for the final of the men's Africa Cup of Nations between Senegal and Morocco.

== Career ==
Viana began her refereeing career in 2005 as an amateur referee, and became the first woman to be assigned to matches of the Premier League of Eswatini in 2007. Following her FIFA designation, Viana was assigned for a match at the 2016 Women's Africa Cup of Nations in Cameroon. She oversaw the game between Kenya and Nigeria at the Limbe Stadium, which ended in a Nigerian 4–0 victory. Viana was a fourth official at the semifinal between Nigeria and South Africa (1–0). She was again selected for a Women's Africa Cup of Nations in the 2018 tournament in Ghana, refereeing a loss of the locals against Mali 1–2. After the match, Ghana's coach Bashir Hayford accused Viana of being "intimidating" to his players and that the game was played "80% by the referee (Viana)."

Viana had a third participation at a Women's African Cup in 2022, at the edition in Morocco, where she performed in two matches: a group stage match between Botswana and Nigeria, which ended in a Nigerian victory 0–2, and a repechage game between Senegal and Tunisia at the Moulay Hassan Stadium, which finalised in a Senegalese victory on penalties.

Beyond her CAF competitions, Viana was chosen as a VAR official for the 2022 FIFA U-17 Women's World Cup in India, developing a stronger career in the VAR field afterwards, by being appointed to the 2024 Women's Africa Cup of Nations and the 2025 COSAFA Cup. At COSAFA, a regional FIFA-affiliated confederation, Viana has taken part in several of its tournaments.

In 2024, Viana, who had been already active in VAR, was officialised by FIFA as a listed representative in the field.

Viana was appointed as assistant VAR for the men's 2025 Africa Cup of Nations final between Senegal and Morocco in Rabat on 18 January 2026.

== Personal life ==
Viana works for the Ministry of Sports, Culture and Youth Affairs in the government of Eswatini since 2024, where she serves as an assistant sports officer and manager of sporting events at the Somhlolo National Stadium. She joined the civil service in 2007, serving for the Ministry of Education.

Prior to pursuing a refereeing career, Viana was a footballer, playing for Two for Joy and later the Mbabatane football clubs.

== Selected performances ==
Date	Match	Result	Round	Tournament
26 November 2016	Kenya – Nigeria	0–4	Group stage	2016 Women's Africa Cup of Nations
20 November 2018	Ghana – Mali	1–2	Group stage	2018 Women's Africa Cup of Nations
7 July 2022	Botswana – Nigeria	0–2	Group stage	2022 Women's Africa Cup of Nations
17 July 2022	Senegal – Tunisia	0–0 (4–2)	Repechage	2022 Women's Africa Cup of Nations
18 January 2026	Senegal – Morocco	0–3 (Note: The final match originally finished as a 1–0 win for Senegal after extra time. On 17 March 2026, the CAF Appeal Board ruled that Senegal had forfeited the match for temporarily refusing to play and leaving the pitch in protest of a refereeing decision. Pursuant to articles 82 and 84 of the competition regulations, the final was awarded as a 3–0 win for Morocco, thereby retroactively declaring them as 2025 Africa Cup of Nations champions and stripping Senegal of the title.)	Final	2025 Africa Cup of Nations (Note: Men's tournament. Selected as assistant VAR.)
