= Moses Sichone =

Zambian footballer (born 1977)

Personal information
- Date of birth: 31 May 1977 (age 49)
- Place of birth: Mufulira, Zambia
- Height: 1.87 m (6 ft 2 in)
- Position: Centre-back

Senior career*
Years	Team	Apps	(Gls)
1993–1994	Chambishi FC	29	(2)
1995–1998	Nchanga Rangers	77	(0)
1999–2004	1. FC Köln	114	(0)
2004–2007	Alemannia Aachen	76	(3)
2007–2008	Kickers Offenbach	19	(3)
2008–2009	VfR Aalen	21	(0)
2009–2010	AEP Paphos	24	(2)
2010–2011	Carl Zeiss Jena	19	(1)

International career
1998–2006	Zambia	40	(2)

Managerial career
- 2022: Zambia (caretaker)
- 2022–2023: Zambia (assistant)
- 2025-2026: Zambia
- * Club domestic league appearances and goals

Moses Sichone (born 31 May 1977) is a Zambian football manager and former professional footballer. As a player, he spent most of his career with German clubs.

== Club career ==
Sichone joined the squad of Kickers Offenbach in June 2007. With Alemannia Aachen Sichone played in the Bundesliga, and in the 2004/05 season of the UEFA Cup. After ten years in Germany he left the country on 20 July 2009 and signed for AEP Paphos. On 12 July 2010, Sichone signed a one-year contract in the 3. Liga for Carl Zeiss Jena. His contract was not renewed and he left the club on 30 June 2011.

== International career ==
Sichone was part of the Zambia national team at the 2000 African Nations Cup, which finished third in group C in the first round of competition, thus failing to secure qualification for the quarter-finals.
