= Benson Sakala =

Zambian footballer (born 1996)

Personal information
- Date of birth: 12 September 1996 (age 30)
- Place of birth: Lusaka, Zambia
- Height: 1.85 m (6 ft 1 in)
- Position: Midfielder

Team information
- Current team: Bohemians 1905
- Number: 6

Senior career*
Years	Team	Apps	(Gls)
2014–2015	Red Arrows		
2015–2021	Power Dynamos		
2021–2022	Viktoria Žižkov	10	(0)
2022–2023	Viagem Příbram	20	(1)
2023–2025	Mladá Boleslav	45	(2)
2025–	Bohemians 1905	23	(1)

International career^{‡}
2015	Zambia U23	3	(0)
2015–	Zambia	35	(0)
- * Club domestic league appearances and goals as of 15 May 2026 ‡ National team caps and goals as of 26 March 2023

Benson Sakala (born 12 September 1996) is a Zambian professional footballer who plays as a midfielder for Bohemians 1905 and the Zambia national team.

== Career ==
On 6 July 2023, Sakala signed a two-year contract with Czech side Mladá Boleslav.

On 30 May 2025, Sakala signed a contract with Czech side Bohemians 1905 as a free agent.

== International career ==
On 10 December 2025, Sakala was called up to the Zambia squad for the 2025 Africa Cup of Nations.
