= Ahmed Soilihi =

Footballer (born 1996)

Personal information
- Date of birth: 1 July 1996 (age 30)
- Place of birth: Istres, France
- Height: 1.85 m (6 ft 1 in)
- Position: Defender

Team information
- Current team: Toulon
- Number: 3

Youth career
- Istres

Senior career*
| Years | Team | Apps | (Gls) |
| 2017–2020 | Athlético Marseille | 69 | (0) |
| 2020–2021 | Quevilly-Rouen | 10 | (0) |
| 2022–2024 | Martigues | 51 | (0) |
| 2024 | Dinamo Batumi | 0 | (0) |
| 2024–2025 | Quevilly-Rouen | 28 | (0) |
| 2025– | Toulon | 12 | (0) |

International career^{‡}
| 2017– | Comoros | 8 | (0) |
- * Club domestic league appearances and goals as of 13 December 2025 ‡ National team caps and goals as of 15:35, 24 December 2023 (UTC)

Ahmed Soilihi (Arabic: أحمد سويليهي; born 1 July 1996) is a professional footballer who plays as a defender for Championnat National 1 club Toulon. Born in France, he plays for the Comoros national team.

== Club career ==
Soilihi was trained in the youth academy of Istres, and moved to Athlético Marseille in the summer of 2017. In July 2020, he signed for Championnat National side Quevilly-Rouen. In January 2022, Soilihi joined Championnat National 2 side Martigues.

== International career ==
Soilihi made his professional debut for the Comoros national team in a 1–0 friendly win over Mauritania on 6 October 2017.

On 11 December 2025, Soilihi was called up to the Comoros squad for the 2025 Africa Cup of Nations.
