= Zambia national football team =

Zambia
- Nickname: Chipolopolo (The Copper Bullets)
- Association: Football Association of Zambia (FAZ)
- Confederation: CAF (Africa)
- Sub-confederation: COSAFA (Southern Africa)
- Head coach: Moses Sichone
- Captain: Fashion Sakala
- Most caps: Kennedy Mweene (122)
- Top scorer: Godfrey Chitalu (79)
- Home stadium: Levy Mwanawasa Stadium; National Heroes Stadium
- FIFA code: ZAM
First colours	Second colours	Third colours

FIFA ranking
- Current: 91 (18 November 2026)
- Highest: 15 (February – May 1996, August 1996)
- Lowest: 102 (February 2011)

First international
- Southern Rhodesia 0–4 Northern Rhodesia (Southern Rhodesia; 1946)

Biggest win
- Zambia 11–2 Swaziland (Lusaka, Zambia; 5 February 1978); Zambia 9–0 Kenya (Lilongwe, Malawi; 13 November 1978); Zambia 9–0 Lesotho (Botswana; 8 August 1988)

Biggest defeat
- DR Congo 10–1 Zambia (DR Congo; 22 November 1969); Belgium 9–0 Zambia (Brussels, Belgium; 3 June 1994)

Africa Cup of Nations
- Appearances: 19 (first in 1974)
- Best result: Champions (2012)

COSAFA Cup
- Appearances: 19 (first in 1997)
- Best result: Champions (1997, 1998, 2006, 2013, 2019, 2022, 2023)

African Nations Championship
- Appearances: 5 (first in 2009)
- Best result: Third place (2009)
Medal record
Africa Cup of Nations
Gold medal – first place	2012 Gabon and Equatorial Guinea	Team
Silver medal – second place	1974 Egypt	Team
Silver medal – second place	1994 Tunisia	Team
Bronze medal – third place	1982 Libya	Team
Bronze medal – third place	1990 Algeria	Team
Bronze medal – third place	1996 South Africa	Team
African Nations Championship
Bronze medal – third place	2009 Ivory Coast	Team
COSAFA Cup
Gold medal – first place	1997 Southern Africa	Team
Gold medal – first place	1998 Southern Africa	Team
Gold medal – first place	2006 Southern Africa	Team
Gold medal – first place	2013 Zambia	Team
Gold medal – first place	2019 South Africa	Team
Gold medal – first place	2022 South Africa	Team
Gold medal – first place	2023 South Africa	Team
Silver medal – second place	2004 Southern Africa	Team
Silver medal – second place	2005 Southern Africa	Team
Silver medal – second place	2007 Southern Africa	Team
Silver medal – second place	2009 Zimbabwe	Team
Silver medal – second place	2017 South Africa	Team
Silver medal – second place	2018 South Africa	Team
Bronze medal – third place	2008 South Africa	Team
CECAFA Cup
Gold medal – first place	1984 Uganda	Team
Gold medal – first place	1991 Uganda	Team
Silver medal – second place	1976 Zanzibar	Team
Silver medal – second place	1977 Somalia	Team
Silver medal – second place	1978 Malawi	Team
Silver medal – second place	1988 Malawi	Team
Silver medal – second place	2006 Ethiopia	Team
Bronze medal – third place	1973 Uganda	Team
Bronze medal – third place	1974 Tanzania	Team
Bronze medal – third place	1981 Tanzania	Team
Bronze medal – third place	1992 Tanzania	Team
Bronze medal – third place	2013 Kenya	Team

The Zambia national football team represents Zambia in men's association football and is governed by the Football Association of Zambia (FAZ). During the 1980s, they were known as the KK 11, after founding president Dr. Kenneth Kaunda ("KK") who ruled Zambia from 1964 to 1991. After the country adopted multiparty politics, the side was nicknamed Chipolopolo, which means the "Copper Bullets". The team won an Africa Cup of Nations title in 2012. The team has also become the most successful team in the COSAFA Cup, surpassing Zimbabwe after winning the 2023 edition.

== History ==
=== Zambian Air Force Flight 319 ===
Tragedy struck the Zambian team when the military plane (REG: AF-319) transporting the team to Senegal for a 1994 FIFA World Cup qualifier crashed late in the evening of April 27, 1993. Three stops were planned for re-fuelling, but at the first stop, in Brazzaville, engine problems were noted on the Buffalo DHC-5D of the Zambia Air Force. Despite this, the flight continued, and a few minutes after take-off from Libreville, Gabon, where the second stopover had taken place, one of the engines caught fire and stopped. The pilot, who had already made a flight from Mauritius the day before, accidentally shut down the other engine, which was still running. The loss of power, during the climb after take-off, caused the plane to fall and crash into the water 500m off the coast. All 30 passengers and crew, including 18 players, were killed in the accident.

=== 1994–2012 ===
On June 3, 1994, in Brussels, the Zambian football team succumbed to one of the worst losses in its history against Belgium, losing 9–0. At CAN 1996, they finished first in the group with two victories (5–1 against Burkina Faso, goals from Kenneth Malitoli, double from Kalusha Bwalya, goals from Dennis Lota and Johnson Bwalya); 4–0 against Sierra Leone (a hattrick from Kalusha Bwalya and goal from Mordon Malitoli) and a draw (0–0 against Algeria), beat Egypt (3–1) in the quarterfinals and loses in semis against Tunisia (2–4) but took third place over Ghana (1–0, goal from Johnson Bwalya). Kalusha Bwalya was the best in the competition with 5 goals. From 1998 to 2006, Zambia did not pass the first round, except in 2004 when they failed to qualify. On September 3, 2006, at home, Zambia achieved the biggest victory in its history against Djibouti, winning 10–0. During the 2008 Africa Cup of Nations, Zambia finished third in the group with a 3–0 victory against Sudan (goals by James Chamanga, Jacob Mulenga and Felix Katongo), a draw (1–1 against Egypt, goal from Chris Katongo) and loss (1–5 against Cameroon, goal from Chris Katongo). In 2010, Zambia finished first in its group and faced Nigeria in the quarter-finals where they lost on penalties. Jacob Mulenga and Emmanuel Mbola were included in the tournament's Best XI. In 2012, the best AFCON in Zambia history happened. During the tournament's group stage, they defeated Senegal(2–1), drew with Libya (2-2), and defeated Equatorial Guinea (1–0), and qualified top of their group. During the knockout stage, Zambia defeated Sudan (3–0) in the Quarterfinals, beat Ghana in the semifinals (1–0) and went up against Ivory Coast in the final, where they won their first title, after defeating them in a dramatic Penalty shootout after a 0–0 draw after extra time.

== Kit provider ==
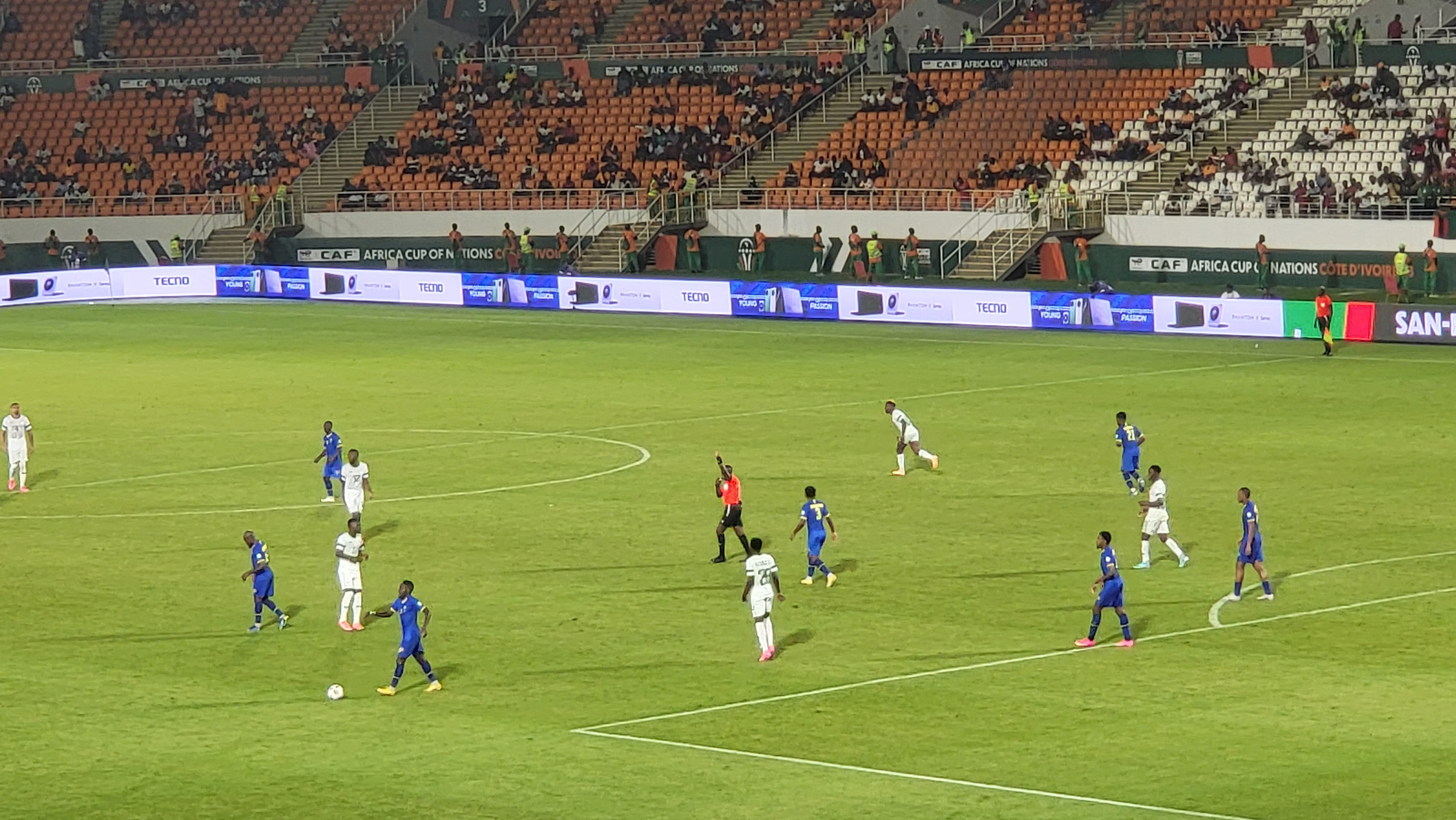
The national football team of Zambia faced Tanzania in the 2023 Africa Cup of Nations

Kit provider	Period
(Germany) Adidas	1993–1996
(Germany) Puma	1997–2000
(Italy) Diadora	2001–2002
(England) Umbro	2003
(United States) Nike	2004–2015
(Italy) Kappa	2016
(Singapore) Mafro	2017
(Zambia) KoPa	2018–2025
(Germany) Adidas	2026–present

== Results and fixtures ==
The following is a list of match results in the last 12 months, as well as any future matches that have been scheduled.

Win Draw Loss Fixture

=== 2025 ===
15 November Friendly	South Africa	3–1	Zambia	Gqeberha, South Africa
15:00 UTC+2	Appollis 43'; Nkota 62'; Sithole 68'	Report	Sabobo 90+2'	Stadium: Nelson Mandela Bay Stadium; Referee: Naftal Negongo (Namibia)

18 November Friendly	Angola	3–2	Zambia	Luanda, Angola
17:00 UTC+1	Milson 5'; Luvumbo 41'; Mabululu 58'	Report	Lahne 21'; F. Sakala 48'	Stadium: Estádio 11 de Novembro; Attendance: 5000; Referee: Luxolo Badi (South Africa)

16 December Friendly	Zambia	0–2	DR Congo	Murcia, Spain
16:00 UTC+1		Report	Masuaku 21'; Bushiri 72'	Stadium: Pinatar Arena; Referee: Javier Alberola Rojas (Spain)

22 December 2025 AFCON Group A	Mali	1–1	Zambia	Casablanca, Morocco
15:00 UTC+1	Sinayoko 61'	Report	Daka 90+2'	Stadium: Mohammed V Stadium; Referee: Omar Artan (Somalia)

26 December 2025 AFCON Group A	Zambia	0–0	Comoros	Casablanca, Morocco
18:30 UTC+1		Report		Stadium: Mohammed V Stadium; Referee: Ahmad Heeralall (Mauritius)

29 December 2025 AFCON Group A	Zambia	0–3	Morocco	Rabat, Morocco
20:00 UTC+1	Kangwa (red card) 90+5'	Report	El Kaabi 9', 50'; Díaz 27'	Stadium: Prince Moulay Abdellah Stadium; Referee: Issa Sy (Senegal)

=== 2026 ===
28 March Friendly	Zambia	0–0 (9–8 p)	Malawi	Francistown, Botswana
15:00 UTC+2				Stadium: Obed Itani Chilume Stadium; Referee: Keabetswe Dintwa (Botswana)
	Penalties
	TBA (penalty scored); TBA (penalty scored); TBA (penalty scored); TBA (penalty scored); TBA (penalty scored); TBA (penalty scored); TBA (penalty scored); TBA (penalty missed); TBA (penalty scored); TBA (penalty scored)		TBA (penalty scored); TBA (penalty scored); TBA (penalty scored); TBA (penalty scored); TBA (penalty scored); TBA (penalty scored); TBA (penalty scored); TBA (penalty missed); TBA (penalty scored); TBA (penalty missed)

31 March Friendly	Argentina	5–0	Zambia	Buenos Aires, Argentina
20:30 ARG (UTC–3)	Alvarez 1'; Messi 43'; Otamendi 50' (pen.); Chanda 68' (own goal); Barco 90+4'	Report		Stadium: La Bombonera; Referee: Alexis Herrera (Venezuela)

31 March Friendly	Zambia	0–1	Zimbabwe	Francistown, Botswana
17:00 UTC+2		Report	Kafunti 88' (o.g.)	Stadium: Obed Itani Chilume Stadium; Referee: Moemedi Thabologang(Botswana)

25 September 2027 AFCON qualification	Algeria	3-1	Zambia	Tizi Ouzou, Algeria
21:00 UTC+0	Hadjam 2' Maza 67' Moussa 74'		Sakala 57'	Stadium: Hocine Aït Ahmed Stadium; Referee: Yannick Kambenga Malala (DR Congo)

29 September 2026 2027 AFCON qualification	Zambia	2-0	Togo	Levy Mwanawasa stadium, Zambia
18:00 UTC+0	Kangwanda 3' Mandanji 90+5'			Stadium: TBD; Referee: Mahmoud Ali Mahmoud Ismail (Sudan)

11 November 2027 AFCON qualification	Zambia	v	Burundi	TBD, Zambia
TBD				Stadium: TBD

15 November 2027 AFCON qualification	Burundi	v	Zambia	TBD, Burundi
TBD				Stadium: TBD

=== 2027 ===
24 March 2027 AFCON qualification	Zambia	v	Algeria	TBD, Zambia
TBD				Stadium: TBD

28 March 2027 AFCON qualification	Togo	v	Zambia	TBD, Togo
TBD				Stadium: TBD

== Managers ==
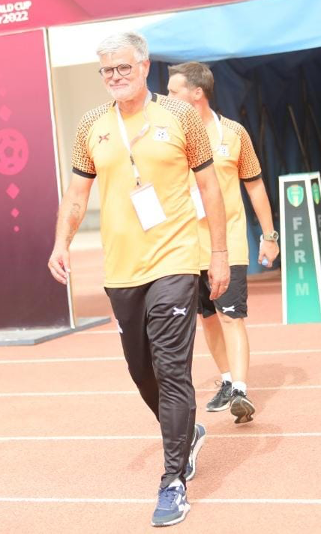
Aljoša Asanović coached the national football team of Zambia

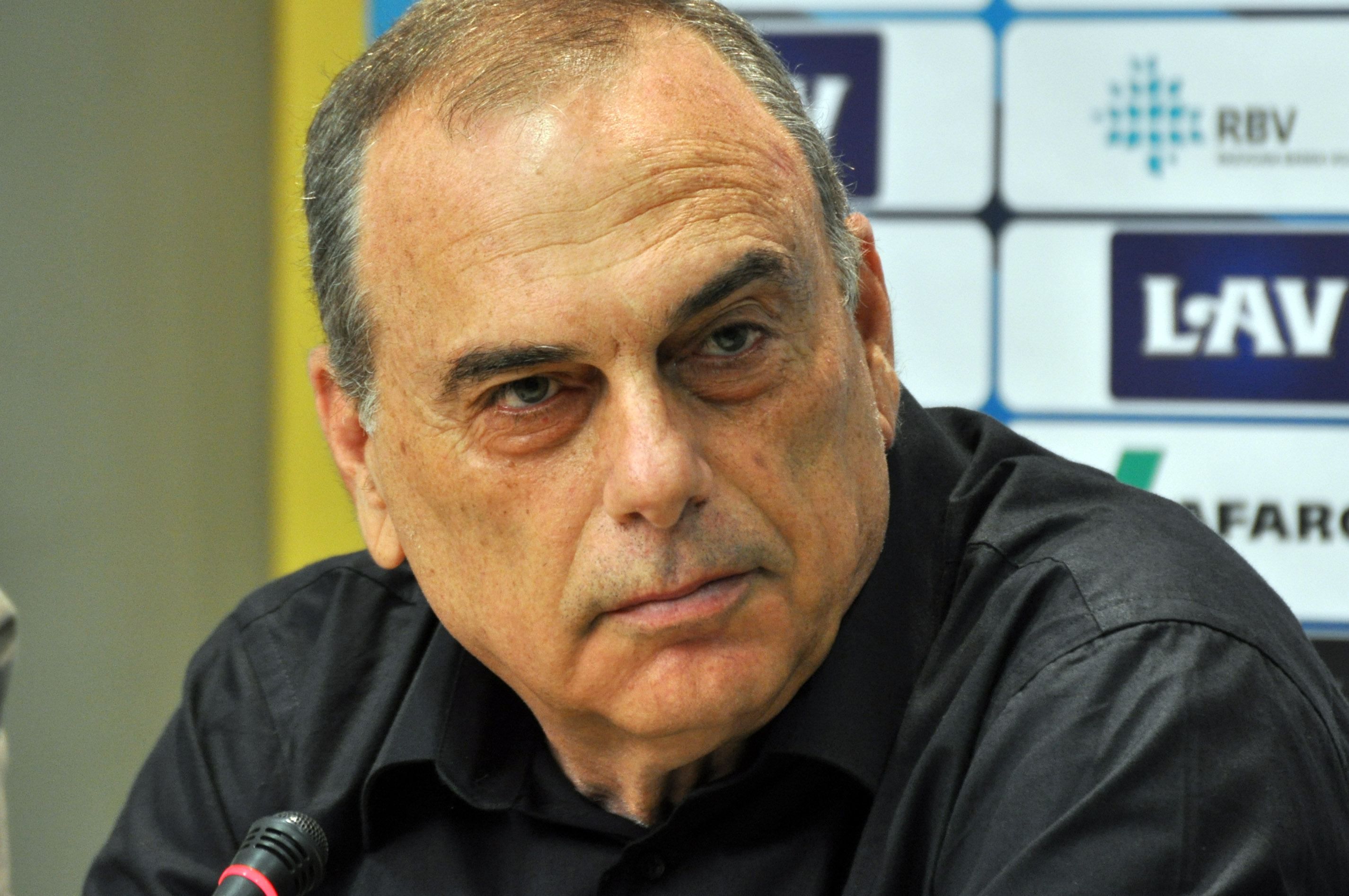
Avram Grant became the manager of the national football team of Zambia in 2022

Caretaker managers are listed in italics.

- (Zambia) Ted Virba (1978)
- (England) Brian Tiler (1978–80)
- (Romania) Ted Dumitru (1980–81)
- (Socialist Federal Republic of Yugoslavia) Ante Bušelić (1981–82)
- (England) Bill McGarry (1982–83)
- (Poland) Wieslaw Grabowski (1983–84)
- (England) Jeff Butler (1984)
- (Zambia) Roy Mulenga (1984)
- (Zambia) Brightwell Banda (1984–86)
- (Zambia) Samuel Ndhlovu (1987–92)
- (Zambia) Moses Simwala (1993)
- (Zambia) Godfrey Chitalu (1993)
- (Denmark) Roald Poulsen (1993–94)
- (Scotland) Ian Porterfield (1994)
- (Denmark) Roald Poulsen (1994–96)
- (Zambia) Freddie Mwila (1996–97)
- (Zambia) George Mungwa (1997)
- (Germany) Burkhard Ziese (1997–98)
- (Zambia) George Mungwa (1998)
- (Zambia) Obby Kapita (1998)
- (Zambia) Fighton Simukonda (1998)
- (Zambia) Ben Bamfuchile (1999–2000)
- (Zambia) George Mungwa (2000)
- (Netherlands) Jan Brouwer (2000–01)
- (Denmark) Roald Poulsen (2002)
- (Zambia) Patrick Phiri (2002–03)
- (Zambia) Kalusha Bwalya (2003–06)
- (Zambia) Patrick Phiri (2006–08)
- (France) Hervé Renard (2008–10)
- (Zambia) Wedson Nyirenda & (Zambia) Honour Janza (2010)
- (Zambia) George Lwandamina (2010)
- (Italy) Dario Bonetti (2010–11)
- (France) Hervé Renard (2011–13)
- (France) Patrice Beaumelle (2013–14)
- (Zambia) Honour Janza (2014–15)
- (Zambia) George Lwandamina (2015–16)
- (Zambia) Wedson Nyirenda (2016–18)
- (Zambia) Beston Chambeshi (2018)
- (Belgium) Sven Vandenbroeck (2018–19)
- (Zambia) Aggrey Chiyangi (2019–20)
- (Serbia) Milutin Sredojević (2020–21)
- (Zambia) Beston Chambeshi (2021–22)
- (Croatia) Aljoša Asanović (2022)
- (Zambia) Moses Sichone (2022)
- (Israel) Avram Grant (2022–2025)
- (Zambia) Moses Sichone (2025–present)

== Players ==
=== Current squad ===
The following players were called up for the 2027 Africa Cup of Nations qualification matches against Algeria and Togo on 25 and 29 September 2026, respectively.

Caps and goals as of 29 December 2025, after the game against Morocco.

No.	Pos.	Player	Date of birth (age)	Caps	Goals	Club
	GK	Lawrence Mulenga	21 August 1998 (age 28)	18	0	(Football Association of Zambia) Power Dynamos
	GK	Willard Mwanza	3 June 1997 (age 29)	4	0	(Football Association of Zambia) Power Dynamos
	GK	Victor Chabu	22 February 1994 (age 32)	1	0	(Football Association of Zambia) Nchanga Rangers
	GK	Luka Mainza		0	0	(Football Association of Zambia) Red Arrows
	DF	Dominic Chanda	26 February 1996 (age 30)	28	1	(Football Association of Zambia) Power Dynamos
	DF	Obino Chisala	14 September 1999 (age 27)	11	0	(Sudan Football Association) Al Merrikh
	DF	Mathews Banda	6 August 2005 (age 21)	7	0	(Football Association of the Czech Republic) Bohemians 1905
	DF	David Hamansenya	24 June 2007 (age 19)	4	0	(Football Association of the Czech Republic) Slovan Liberec
	DF	Tinklar Sinkala	15 February 2001 (age 25)	2	1	(Football Association of Zambia) Zanaco
	DF	Fredrick Mwimanzi	5 October 1996 (age 30)	1	0	(Football Association of Zambia) Zanaco
	DF	Ricky Chanda	5 May 2005 (age 21)	0	0	(Estonian Football Association) Nõmme United
	DF	Owen Mwamba	24 July 1998 (age 28)	0	0	(Football Association of Zambia) Red Arrows
	MF	Lameck Banda	29 January 2001 (age 25)	22	3	(Libyan Football Federation) Asswehly
	MF	Gamphani Lungu	19 September 1998 (age 28)	17	0	(South African Football Association) Orlando Pirates
	MF	Miguel Chaiwa	7 June 2004 (age 22)	16	0	(Scottish Football Association) Hibernian
	MF	Owen Tembo	16 May 1995 (age 31)	7	0	(Football Association of Zambia) Power Dynamos
	MF	Wilson Chisala	25 May 2002 (age 24)	6	0	(Football Association of Zambia) Power Dynamos
	MF	David Simukonda	10 August 2005 (age 21)	4	0	(Egyptian Football Association) El Gouna
	MF	Given Kalusa	28 November 2003 (age 22)	1	0	(Football Association of Zambia) MUZA
	MF	Joseph Liteta	22 February 2006 (age 20)	1	0	(Italian Football Federation) Cagliari
	MF	Pascal Phiri	17 July 2005 (age 21)	1	0	(Egyptian Football Association) Al Ittihad
	FW	Fashion Sakala (captain)	14 March 1997 (age 29)	38	11	(Saudi Arabian Football Federation) Al-Fayha
	FW	Patson Daka	9 October 1998 (age 28)	46	21	(German Football Association) Hamburger SV
	FW	Albert Kangwanda	7 April 1999 (age 27)	15	5	(Tanzania Football Federation) Young Africans
	FW	Eliya Mandanji	20 November 2007 (age 19)	3	0	(Football Association of Zambia) Red Arrows
	FW	Kingstone Mutandwa	5 January 2003 (age 23)	2	0	(Swiss Football Association) Servette
	FW	Chanka Zimba	29 December 2001 (age 24)	1	0	Unattached

=== Recent call-ups ===
The following players had been called up in 12 months preceding the above draft.

Pos.	Player	Date of birth (age)	Caps	Goals	Club	Latest call-up
GK	Mangani Banda	13 July 1997 (age 29)	0	0	(Zambia) Kabwe Warriors	v. Argentina, 31 March 2026
GK	Francis Mwansa	14 July 2002 (age 24)	7	0	(Zambia) Zanaco	2025 Africa Cup of Nations
GK	Toaster Nsabata	24 November 1993 (age 32)	43	0	(South Africa) Sekhukhune United	v. Angola, 18 November 2025
GK	Charles Kalumba	21 January 1996 (age 30)	7	0	(Zambia) Red Arrows	v. Angola, 18 November 2025
DF	Kondwani Chiboni	14 September 1996 (age 30)	3	0	(Zambia) Power Dynamos	v. Argentina, 31 March 2026
DF	Brian Chilimina	27 June 1997 (age 29)	1	0	(Zambia) Red Arrows	v. Argentina, 31 March 2026
DF	Frankie Musonda	12 December 1997 (age 28)	20	1	Bahrain SC	2025 Africa Cup of Nations
DF	Lubambo Musonda (vice-captain)	1 March 1995 (age 31)	59	2	(Germany) 1. FC Magdeburg	2025 Africa Cup of Nations
DF	Stoppila Sunzu	22 June 1989 (age 37)	89	5	(China) Changchun Yatai	2025 Africa Cup of Nations
DF	Kabaso Chongo	11 February 1992 (age 34)	44	1	(Zambia) ZESCO United	2025 Africa Cup of Nations
DF	Gift Mphande	19 November 2003 (age 23)	13	0	(Zambia) ZESCO United	2025 Africa Cup of Nations
DF	Killian Kanguluma	16 December 1999 (age 26)	7	1	(Zambia) Kabwe Warriors	v. Angola, 18 November 2025
DF	Chanda Chileshe	28 November 2004 (age 21)	0	0	(Zambia) MUZA	v. Angola, 18 November 2025
MF	Fredrick Mulambia	10 July 2002 (age 24)	15	2	(Zambia) Power Dynamos	v. Argentina, 31 March 2026
MF	Kelvin Mwanza	9 July 1983 (age 43)	6	0	(Zambia) MUZA	v. Argentina, 31 March 2026
MF	Kings Kangwa	6 April 1999 (age 27)	43	7	(Greece) Panathinaikos	2025 Africa Cup of Nations
MF	Benson Sakala	12 September 1996 (age 30)	37	0	(Czech Republic) Bohemians 1905	2025 Africa Cup of Nations
MF	Gift Siame	27 April 2006 (age 20)	0	0	(Spain) Leganés	v. Angola, 18 November 2025
MF	Humphrey Bwembya	28 November 2005 (age 20)	0	0	(Zambia) Kabwe Warriors	v. Angola, 18 November 2025
MF	Rickson Ng'ambi	20 December 2004 (age 21)	0	0	(Zambia) MUZA	v. Angola, 18 November 2025
MF	Solomon Mpasela	1 April 2004 (age 22)	0	0	(Zambia) MUZA	v. Angola, 18 November 2025
FW	Jack Lahne	24 October 2001 (age 25)	4	1	Austria Lustenau	2025 Africa Cup of Nations
FW	Joseph Sabobo	17 December 2005 (age 20)	14	1	(Israel) Hapoel Be'er Sheva	2025 Africa Cup of Nations
FW	Kennedy Musonda	28 December 1994 (age 31)	20	4	(Israel) Hapoel Ramat Gan	2025 Africa Cup of Nations
FW	Andrew Phiri	21 May 2001 (age 25)	1	0	(Tanzania) Singida Black Stars	v. Angola, 18 November 2025
Notes: ^{DEC} Refused to join the team after the call-up.; ^{INJ} Withdrew due to an injury.; ^{PRE} Preliminary Squad.; ^{RET} Retired from international association football.; ^{SUS} Suspended from the team.

== Player records ==
As of 31 March 2026
Players in bold are still active with Zambia.

=== Most appearances ===
Rank	Player	Apps	Goals	Career
1	Kennedy Mweene	122	2	2004–2021
2	David Chabala	115	0	1983–1993
3	Godfrey Chitalu	111	79	1968–1980
4	Joseph Musonda	108	0	2002–2014
5	Rainford Kalaba	103	15	2005–2018
5	Christopher Katongo	103	23	2003–2016
7	Alex Chola	102	43	1975–1985
8	Elijah Tana	101	4	1995–2009
9	Derby Makinka	98	10	1985–1993
10	**Stoppila Sunzu**	97	6	2008–present

=== Top goalscorers ===
Rank	Player	Goals	Apps	Ratio	Career
1	Godfrey Chitalu	79	111	0.71	1968–1980
2	Alex Chola	43	102	0.42	1975–1985
3	Kalusha Bwalya	39	87	0.45	1983–2004
4	Bernard Chanda	29	68	0.43	1971–1980
5	Christopher Katongo	23	103	0.22	2003–2016
6	Collins Mbesuma	22	65	0.34	2003–2017
7	**Patson Daka**	21	54	0.39	2015–present
7	Dennis Lota	21	78	0.27	1994–2002
9	Kenneth Malitoli	19	80	0.24	1988–1999
10	James Chamanga	17	63	0.27	2005–2015

== Competitive record ==
=== FIFA World Cup ===
FIFA World Cup record									Qualification record					
Year	Round	Position	Pld	W	D*	L	GF	GA	Pld	W	D	L	GF	GA
1930 to 1962	Not a FIFA member								Not a FIFA member					
(England) 1966	Did not enter								Did not enter					
(Mexico) 1970	Did not qualify								2	1	0	1	6	6
(West Germany) 1974	Did not qualify								10	4	3	3	19	11
(Argentina) 1978	Did not qualify								6	3	1	2	9	5
(Spain) 1982	Did not qualify								4	2	1	1	6	2
(Mexico) 1986	Did not qualify								6	2	1	3	8	6
(Italy) 1990	Did not qualify								6	3	0	3	7	6
(United States) 1994	Did not qualify								8	5	1	2	17	5
(France) 1998	Did not qualify								8	3	2	3	10	8
(South Korea) (Japan) 2002	Did not qualify								10	5	2	3	16	11
(Germany) 2006	Did not qualify								12	7	2	3	21	11
(South Africa) 2010	Did not qualify								10	3	3	4	4	6
(Brazil) 2014	Did not qualify								6	3	2	1	11	4
(Russia) 2018	Did not qualify								8	4	2	2	11	7
(Qatar) 2022	Did not qualify								6	2	1	3	8	9
(Canada) (Mexico) (United States) 2026	Did not qualify								8	3	0	5	10	10
(Morocco) (Portugal) (Spain) 2030	To be determined								To be determined					
(Saudi Arabia) 2034	To be determined								To be determined					
Total		0/15							110	50	21	39	163	107

=== Africa Cup of Nations ===
Africa Cup of Nations record									Qualification record					
Year	Round	Position	Pld	W	D*	L	GF	GA	Pld	W	D*	L	GF	GA
(Sudan) 1957 to (Ghana) 1963	Not affiliated to CAF								Not affiliated to CAF					
(Tunisia) 1965	Did not enter								Did not enter					
(Ethiopia) 1968	Did not enter								Did not enter					
(Sudan) 1970	Did not qualify								4	1	1	2	9	8
(Cameroon) 1972	Did not qualify								4	2	0	2	8	6
(Egypt) 1974	Runners-up	2nd	5	3	1	2	9	9	4	2	0	2	11	7
(Ethiopia) 1976	Did not qualify								4	2	0	2	13	6
(Ghana) 1978	Group stage	5th	3	1	1	1	3	2	2	1*	0	1	2	2
(Nigeria) 1980	Did not qualify								4	1	1	2	5	2
(Libya) 1982	Third place	3rd	5	3	0	2	7	3	4	4	0	0	6	2
(Ivory Coast) 1984	Did not qualify								2	0	1	1	1	2
(Egypt) 1986	Group stage	7th	3	0	1	2	2	4	2	1	1	0	1	0
(Morocco) 1988	Withdrew								Withdrew					
(Algeria) 1990	Third place	3rd	5	3	1	1	3	2	4	3	0	1	8	2
(Senegal) 1992	Quarter-finals	7th	3	1	0	2	1	2	6	4	1	1	11	4
(Tunisia) 1994	Runners-up	2nd	5	3	1	1	7	2	6	4	2	0	10	2
(South Africa) 1996	Third place	3rd	6	4	1	1	15	6	4	3	0	1	7	2
(Burkina Faso) 1998	Group stage	10th	3	1	1	1	4	6	6	4	2	0	9	3
(Ghana) (Nigeria) 2000	Group stage	13th	3	0	2	1	3	5	6	5	1	0	9	2
(Mali) 2002	Group stage	14th	3	0	1	2	1	3	8	3	2	3	7	6
(Tunisia) 2004	Did not qualify								6	3	2	1	6	5
(Egypt) 2006	Group stage	11th	3	1	0	2	3	6	12	7	2	3	16	11
(Ghana) 2008	Group stage	9th	3	1	1	1	5	6	6	3	2	1	9	3
(Angola) 2010	Quarter-finals	6th	4	1	2	1	5	5	10	3	3	4	4	10
(Gabon) (Equatorial Guinea) 2012	Champions	1st	6	4	2	0	9	3	6	4	1	1	11	2
(South Africa) 2013	Group stage	12th	3	0	3	0	2	2	2	1*	0	1	1	1
(Equatorial Guinea) 2015	Group stage	13th	3	0	2	1	2	3	6	3	2	1	6	2
(Gabon) 2017	Did not qualify								6	1	4	1	7	7
(Egypt) 2019	Did not qualify								6	2	1	3	8	7
(Cameroon) 2021	Did not qualify								6	2	1	3	8	12
(Ivory Coast) 2023	Group stage	20th	3	0	2	1	2	3	6	4	1	1	12	6
(Morocco) 2025	Group stage	19th	3	0	2	1	1	4	6	4	1	1	7	4
(Kenya) (Tanzania) (Uganda) 2027	To be determined								To be determined					
2028	To be determined								To be determined					
Total	1 title	19/35	73	26	24	23	84	76	148	77	32	39	212	126

=== COSAFA Cup ===
Year	COSAFA Cup record						
Year	Result	Pld	W	D	L	GF	GA
1997	Winners	5	3	2	0	11	4
1998	Winners	5	3	2	0	5	2
1999	Semi-finals	2	0	1	1	1	2
2000	Quarter-finals	2	1	1	0	3	0
2001	Semi-finals	3	1	2	0	3	2
2002	Semi-finals	2	1	0	1	3	1
2003	Semi-finals	2	1	1	0	5	3
2004	Runners-up	3	2	1	0	3	1
2005	Runners-up	4	2	1	1	7	3
2006	Winners	4	4	0	0	8	1
2007	Runners-up	2	1	1	0	3	0
(South Africa) 2008	Third place	3	1	1	1	2	1
(Zimbabwe) 2009	Runners-up	3	2	0	1	4	3
(Zambia) 2013	Winners	3	2	1	0	5	1
(South Africa) 2015	Quarter-finals	3	1	1	1	3	1
(Namibia) 2016	Quarter-finals	1	0	1	0	0	0
(South Africa) 2017	Runners-up	3	2	0	1	7	6
(South Africa) 2018	Runners-up	3	1	1	1	3	4
(South Africa) 2019	Winners	3	2	1	0	3	2
(South Africa) 2021	Group stage	4	1	1	2	3	4
(South Africa) 2022	Winners	3	2	1	0	6	4
(South Africa) 2023	Winners	5	4	0	1	9	5
(South Africa) 2024	Group stage	3	0	0	3	0	5
Total	7 titles						

== Honours ==
=== Continental ===
- Africa Cup of Nations
  - (gold) Champions (1): 2012
  - (silver) Runners-up (2): 1974, 1994
  - (bronze) Third place (3): 1982, 1990, 1996
- African Nations Championship
  - (bronze) Third place (1): 2009

=== Regional ===
- COSAFA Cup
  - (gold) Champions (7): 1997, 1998, 2006, 2013, 2019, 2022, 2023
  - (silver) Runners-up (6): 2004, 2005, 2007, 2009, 2017, 2018
  - (bronze) Third place (1): 2008
- CECAFA Cup
  - (gold) Champions (2): 1984, 1991
  - (silver) Runners-up (5): 1976, 1977, 1978, 1988, 2006
  - (bronze) Third place (5): 1973^{s}, 1974^{s}, 1981, 1992, 2013

=== Awards ===
- African National Team of the Year (1): 2012

=== Summary ===
Competition	1st place, gold medalist(s)	2nd place, silver medalist(s)	3rd place, bronze medalist(s)	Total
CAF African Cup of Nations	1	2	3	6
CAF African Nations Championship	0	0	1	1
Total	1	2	4	7

Notes

- ^{s} Shared titles.
