= Dominic Chanda =

Zambian footballer (born 1996)

Personal information
- Date of birth: 26 February 1996 (age 30)
- Place of birth: Lusaka, Zambia
- Position: Defender

Team information
- Current team: Power Dynamos F.C.
- Number: 26

Senior career*
Years	Team	Apps	(Gls)
2017–2019	Circuit City		
2019–2023	Kabwe Warriors		
2023-	Power Dynamos F.C.	3	(0)

International career^{‡}
2019–	Zambia	15	(1)
- * Club domestic league appearances and goals as of 22/6/25 @ 14:08(AEST) ‡ National team caps and goals as of 27 September 2026

Dominic Chanda (born 26 February 1996) is a Zambian professional footballer who plays as a defender for Kabwe Warriors and the Zambia national football team.

== International career ==
On 10 December 2025, Chanda was called up to the Zambia squad for the 2025 Africa Cup of Nations.
