= Kenan Toibibou =

Footballer (born 2004)

Personal information
- Date of birth: 9 December 2004 (age 21)
- Place of birth: Moulins, France
- Height: 1.84 m (6 ft 0 in)
- Position: Centre-back

Team information
- Current team: Cádiz

Youth career
- 2013–2018: Moulins Yzeure
- 2018–2019: Moulins
- 2019: Moulins Yzeure
- 2019–2020: Châteauroux

Senior career*
Years	Team	Apps	(Gls)
2020–2024	Châteauroux II	43	(1)
2021–2024	Châteauroux	7	(0)
2025–2026	Bravo	38	(2)
2026–	Cádiz	0	(0)

International career^{‡}
2020	France U16	2	(0)
2022	Comoros U20	3	(0)
2026–	Comoros U23	1	(0)
2023–	Comoros	11	(0)
- * Club domestic league appearances and goals as of 23 May 2026 ‡ National team caps and goals as of 9 June 2026

Kenan Toibibou (born 9 December 2004) is a professional footballer who plays as a centre-back for Segunda División club Cádiz. Born in France, he plays for the Comoros national team.

== Club career ==
Toibibou is a product of the youth academies of the French clubs Moulins Yzeure, Moulins and Châteauroux. He made his senior and professional debut with Châteauroux in a 2– loss to EA Guingamp on 8 May 2021. On 6 July 2021, he signed his first professional contract with Châteauroux. On 17 February 2025, he joined the Slovenian PrvaLiga club Bravo for a season with an option to extend.

Toibibou left Châteauroux in July 2024, and spent seven months without a club before signing for Slovenian club Bravo in February 2025. On 5 July 2026, he agreed to a four-year contract with Segunda División side Cádiz.

== International career ==
Born in France, Toibibou is of Comorian descent and holds dual French-Comorian citizenship. In 2020, he played for the France U16s. He debuted with the Comoros national team in a friendly 2–1 win over Cape Verde on 17 October 2023.

On 11 December 2025, Toibibou was called up to the Comoros squad for the 2025 Africa Cup of Nations.
