= Willard Mwanza =

Zambian footballer

Personal information
- Date of birth: 3 June 1997 (age 29)
- Place of birth: Lusaka, Zambia
- Height: 1.97 m (6 ft 6 in)
- Position: Goalkeeper

Team information
- Current team: Power Dynamos
- Number: 30

Senior career*
Years	Team	Apps	(Gls)
2021–2022	Konkola Blades		
2022–	Power Dynamos		

International career^{‡}
2025–	Zambia	4	(0)
- * Club domestic league appearances and goals as of 17:15, 4 October 2025 (UTC) ‡ National team caps and goals as of 22:41, 14 October 2025 (UTC)

Willard Mwanza (born 3 June 1997) is a Zambian professional footballer who plays as a goalkeeper for the Zambia Super League club Power Dynamos and the Zambia national team.

== Club career ==
Mwanza began his senior career with the Zambia Super League club Konkola Blades. ON 15 June 2022, he transferred to Power Dynamos on a 2-year contract. He was the recipient of the 2024–25 Zambia Super League Golden Glove award.

== International career ==
Mwanza was first called up to the Zambia national team for the 2024 COSAFA Cup where he was the reserve goalkeeper. A couple of months later he was called up to the 2024 African Nations Championship where he was again backup. He was named Zambia's starting goalkeeper for the 2025 Africa Cup of Nations squads.

== Honours ==
Power Dynamos

- Zambia Super League: 2022–23, 2024–25

Individual

- 2024–25 Zambia Super League Golden Glove
