= David Hamansenya =

Zambian footballer

Personal information
- Date of birth: 24 June 2007 (age 19)
- Place of birth: Lusaka, Zambia
- Height: 1.81 m (5 ft 11 in)
- Position: Left-back

Team information
- Current team: Slovan Liberec (on loan from Leganés)

Youth career
- Shamuel FC
- 2025–2026: Leganés

Senior career*
Years	Team	Apps	(Gls)
2026–	Leganés B	1	(0)
2026	→ Artis Brno (loan)	2	(0)
2026–	→ Slovan Liberec (loan)	0	(0)

International career^{‡}
2023	Zambia U17	3	(0)
2025–	Zambia U20	4	(0)
2025–	Zambia	2	(0)
- * Club domestic league appearances and goals as of 24 May 2026 ‡ National team caps and goals as of 22:41, 14 October 2025 (UTC)

David Hamansenya (born 24 June 2007) is a Zambian professional footballer who plays as a left-back for Czech First League club Slovan Liberec, on loan from Spanish club Leganés, and the Zambia national team.

== Club career ==
A youth product of the Zambian club Shamuel FC, Hamansenya signed a professional 4-year contract with the Spanish club Leganés on 27 August 2025.

On 21 January 2026, Hamansenya joined Czech National Football League club Artis Brno on a half-year loan deal.

On 9 September 2026, Hamansenya joined Czech First League club Slovan Liberec on a one-year loan deal.

== International career ==
Hamansenya was called up to the Zambia U17s for the 2023 U-17 Africa Cup of Nations. He was also called up to the Zambia U20s for the 2025 U-20 Africa Cup of Nations where he was the captain. He was called up to the senior Zambia national team for a set of 2026 FIFA World Cup qualification matches in September 2025.

On 10 December 2025, Hamansenya was called up to the Zambia squad for the 2025 Africa Cup of Nations.
