= Stefano Cusin =

Canadian soccer player and manager

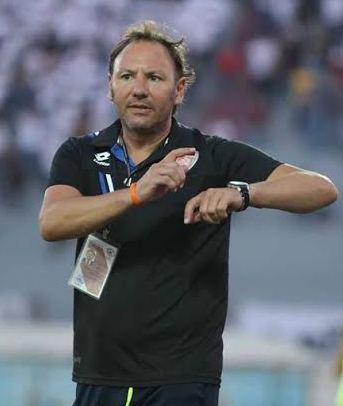
- Cusin, during the final match of West Bank Cup in Palestine, with Ahli Al-Khaleel

Personal information
- Date of birth: 28 October 1968 (age 58)
- Place of birth: Montreal, Quebec, Canada
- Position: Midfielder

Senior career*
Years	Team	Apps	(Gls)
1980–1985	U.S Annemasse		
1985–1987	S.C Toulon		
1987–1988	Etoile Carouge		
1988–1989	Servette de Genève		
1989–1990	Saint-martin		
1990–1991	A.S Roanne		

Managerial career
- 1996–2002: Arezzo
- 2002–2003: Montevarchi
- 2004–2006: Acada Sports
- 2007–2008: Congo U20
- 2008–2009: Botev Plovdiv
- 2008–2009: Al Ittihad Tripoli
- 2010–2011: Al Nassr (assistant)
- 2011–2012: Al-Nasr (assistant)
- 2013: Fujairah
- 2013–2014: Al Jazira (assistant)
- 2014–2015: Ahli Al-Khaleel
- 2016: Al-Shaab
- 2016–2017: Wolverhampton Wanderers (assistant)
- 2018: Black Leopards
- 2018–2019: Ermis Aradippou
- 2019–2020: Ahli Al-Khalil
- 2020–2021: Shahr Khodro
- 2021–2023: South Sudan
- 2023–2026: Comoros
- * Club domestic league appearances and goals

Stefano Cusin (born 28 October 1968) is a Canadian soccer coach and former player who was recently the manager of the Comoros national team. His career included as coach in Europe: France, Italy, Bulgaria, England; in Africa: Cameroon, Congo and Libya; In Asia: Saudi Arabia and United Arab Emirates. He was assistant manager of Wolverhampton Wanderers in the Football League Championship and coach of Shahr Khodro in Persian Gulf Pro League.

== Career ==
Cusin was born in Canada to Italian parents, and grew up speaking Italian and French. At a young age he moved to France, where he was a semi-professional footballer. After retiring as a player, he moved to Italy where he started his coaching career.

=== Cameroon 2003–2006 ===
The first experience was with Mr Henry Njalla Quan the chairman of The Njalla Quan Sports Academy (Acada Sports) based in Limbé asked him to keep on working as the Technical Director of Cameroon for the following three years, in joint venture with one of the Clubs in Italy for the youth programme, Empoli Football Club.

In occasion of the World Cup in Germany 2006, he was filmed by the ARD the Deuch T.V. His Africa story became the little movie "Kick to Goal".

=== Congo ===
In 2007, he signed a two years contract as the National Technical Director of the National Team of Congo. He was responsible of all the National Teams (under 17 to Olympique Team); in 2007 the Congo Team won the under 20 Africa Cup with coach Hudansky and play the World Cup under 20 in Canada. In March 2008 he left Congo because the Federation wasn't paying his salary.

=== Botev Plovdiv ===
In 2008, he moved to Bulgaria to train the Bulgaria Premier League Team, Botev Plovdiv for a 6-month contract. The Team performed well during the football camp in Italy against teams of the Italian Serie A (Catania, Siena, Empoli, Foggia). During the game Botev Plovdiv – Catania, played in Assisi on 24 July 2008, he met "the legend of Inter" Walter Zenga, the former head coach of Catania Team.

=== Al Ittihad Libya ===
In November 2008 he signed a year contract for Al Ittihad Team, Tripoli Libya. When he arrived in November, the Team was only fifth classed. Minus 9 from the first .....eight months later: Al Ittihad won the championship, He also managed the team during the "Arabic Champion Cup" in the semi-final against Club African from Tunisia and the African Champion's League. The Italian newspaper "Corriere dello Sport" selected Stefano Cusin as one of the Italian top Coach in the world, on 2 October 2009.

== Arabic Countries success ==
As a result of his experience in Arabic countries, Cusin receive proposals from Arabic countries and Africa. He was contacted by Walter Zenga, "the Inter legend" in order to train over the Persian Gulf countries. He accepted to be Walter Zenga's assistant to co-work in Saudi for two years.

=== Al Nasr ===
In November 2011 he played in Dubai the "all star" match. A benefit match for the Libyan's Children; part of his team were Materazzi, Zanetti, Madjer, Koller, Muntasser, Nedved, Pires, Fadiga, Zwey, Aboud and Zenga. On 23 December 2011, during the derby of Dubai against Al Wasl, Cusin met the Argentinian Football Legend Diego Maradona ( Coach of Al Wasl), the match finish 2–2.

In January 2012, During the African Cup of Nation 2012 he worked as the "expert of the African Football" for the famous Italian Calciomercato.com. At the beginning of the competition he declared that the Zambia national team was the serious outsider for the title; Zambia won the African Champion in February 2012.

=== Ahli al Khalil – Palestine 2015 ===
Then, Ahli al Khalil were promoted to the Palestinian Cup Final, after a victory against the current holders, Taraji Wad al-Nis, who played at the AFC Cup this season. They won also the last Derby against Shabab (the city rival), becoming one of the best teams in the league.

A team of 30 people including Italian football manager Stefano Cusin, 21 football players and technical, administrative and press members entered Gaza, after both teams were given the necessary permission while crossing the West Bank and the Gaza Strip to play in the Palestinian Cup.

The first game between the two teams was played at Yarmouk Stadium in Gaza on Thursday and the match ended 0-0. Around 7,000 fans packed Gaza's Yarmouk stadium, which was decked with Palestinian national flags.

The return match, originally scheduled on 9 August, was postponed to 14 August, due irregularities on some visas of four players and three executives of Shujaiyeh. The "historic match" eventually ended and was won by Ahli al-Khalil coached from Italian Stefano Cusin. The team of Hebron beat 2-1 Ittihad Shujaiyeh of Gaza, with the winning goal scored in the first minute of extra-time, on free kick, by Ahmad Maher.

While Ahli Al-Khalil's small stadium was filled with fans, people watched on television as well and bustling Gaza fell quiet as Shejaia supporters willed their team on from afar in cafes and restaurants.

On 11 September 2015 Stefano and his team gained their fourth trophy in just eight months by beating 3-2 the Shabab Aldahreya opponent, granting him the victory of Supercup for West Bank Clubs.

After this period Stefano Cusin, has decided to stop for personal reasons his experience by thanking players, staff, supporters and everybody involved in the team.

On 19 October 2015, he enrolled in the "First Class Coach – UEFA Pro" course.

=== Al Shaab ===
In his debut vs Dibba Al-Fujairah Club in President Cup, he won the match by 4–1.

=== Wolverhampton Wanderers ===
On 30 July 2016, the English club announces Stefano Cusin as vice of Walter Zenga. The transfer was possible through Jorge Mendes, the famous football agent. Cusin signed a contract that expired on 30 June 2017.

His debut as assistant manager was against Rotherham, with a draw of 2-2, on 6 August 2016.

The highlights of the season were the home victory on 13 August against Reading (2-0), and away wins on 20 August against Birmingham (1-3) and on 17 September defeating Newcastle (0-2), team that after will win the Championship later that year, in front of an audience of 52000.

In September 2016, Cusin obtained a UEFA PRO License by presenting his thesis entitled "Coaching abroad in the world".

=== Black Leopards ===
On 4 July 2018, the South African team have appointed Stefano Cusin as club's new technical director.

During his first press conference, Cusin said that he will make a contribution to the club in terms of growth and improvement of results, trying to emphasize the African style of play rather than following the European one.

=== Managerial record ===
As of match played 29 December 2025

Managerial record by team and tenure
Team	Nat	From	To	Record					Ref.
Team	Nat	From	To	G	W	D	L	Win %	Ref.
Comoros		2 October 2023	present	40	15	9	16	37.50	
Career Total				40	15	9	16	37.50	—
