= Prince Moulay Abdellah Stadium =

Football stadium in Rabat, Morocco

- Moulay Abdellah Stadium
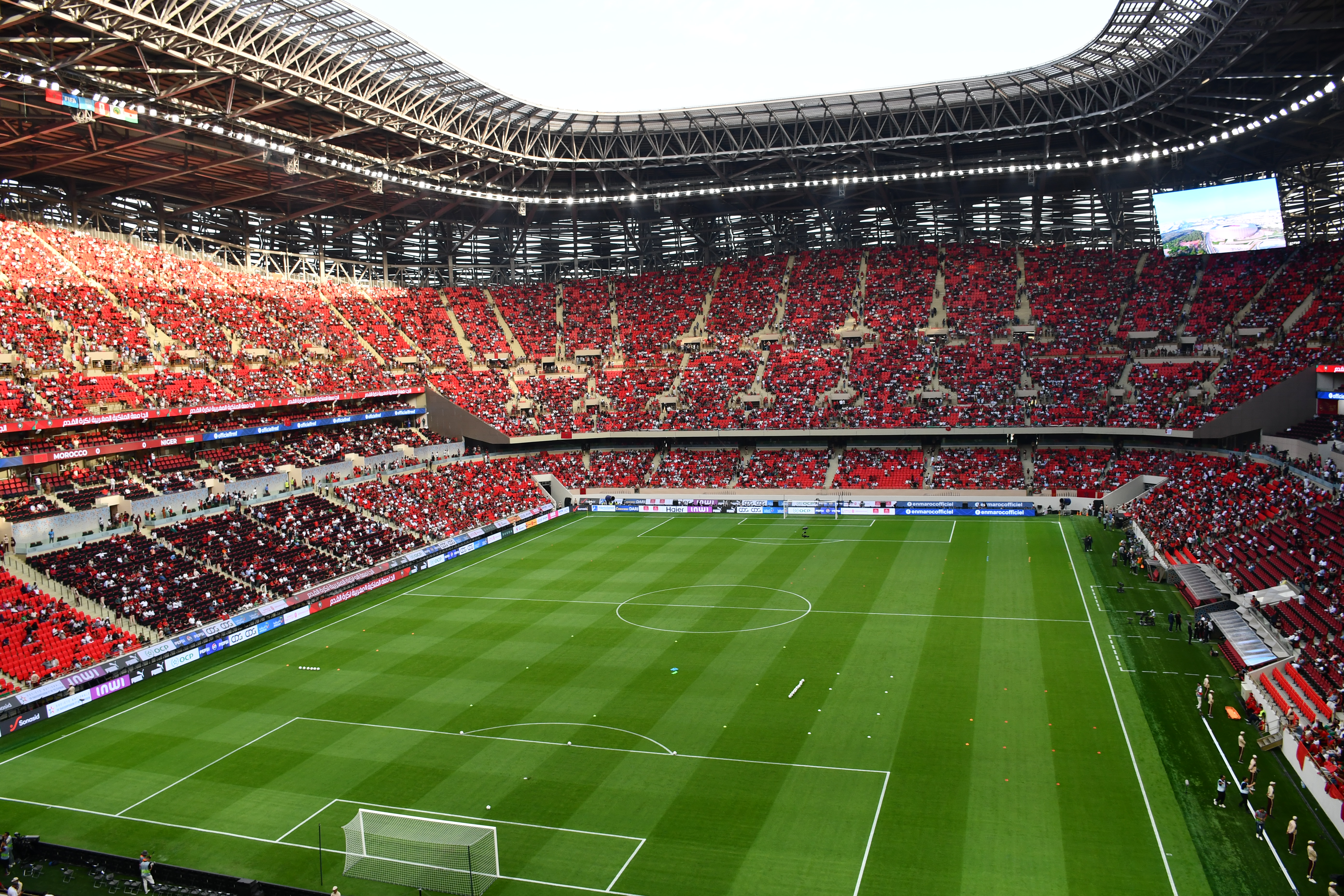
- Interactive map of Prince Moulay Abdellah Stadium
- Full name: Prince Moulay Abdellah Stadium
- Address: Avenue Hassan II
- Location: Rabat, Morocco
- Coordinates: 33°57′34″N 6°53′19″W
- Owner: Department of Sports; Province of Rabat; Royal Moroccan Football Federation
- Operator: Sonarges
- Capacity: 69,500
- Surface: Hybrid grass
- Record attendance: 66,525 (Morocco vs Senegal, 18 January 2026)
- Field size: 105 m × 68 m (115 yd × 74 yd)

Construction
- Groundbreaking: 2023
- Built: 2023–2025
- Opened: 5 September 2025; 14 months ago
- Cost: USD 75 million MAD 686 million
- Architects: Orange Atelier; Populous
- Structural engineers: Temsan; Imyas

Tenants
- AS FAR (2025-present); Morocco national football team (2025-present)

Website
- sonarges.ma

Prince Moulay Abdellah Stadium (Arabic: ملعب الأمير مولاي عبد الله, romanized: Mlʻb al-Amīr Mawlāy ʻAbd Allāh, Berber languages: ⴰⵙⴰⵔⵉⵔ ⵏ ⵓⴳⴻⵍⵍⵉⴷ ⵎⵓⵍⴰⵢ ⵄⴰⴱⴷ ⵍⵍⴰⵀ, romanized: asarir n ugellid mulay ɛabd llah, French: Stade Prince Moulay Abdellah) is a football stadium in Rabat, Morocco, with a seating capacity of 69,500. Opened on 5 September 2025, it is the home stadium of the Morocco national football team. It is part of a larger sports complex that includes an athletics track and field stadium, the indoor Salle Moulay Abdellah arena, and an Olympic swimming pool. It is one of the largest stadiums in Morocco.

The stadium is located 7 kilometres (4 mi) from the center of Rabat, the country's capital. The venue was primarily constructed for the use of football (soccer), and it has VIP and hospitality areas with the most recent technological advancements. Completed for late 2025, the stadium is hosting the 2025 Africa Cup of Nations and the 2030 FIFA World Cup, as well as the Olympic Annex stadium hosting the yearly Rabat International Mohammed VI Athletics Meeting. It was built in two years, potentially granting it a Guinness World Record for the fastest stadium construction in the world.

== History ==
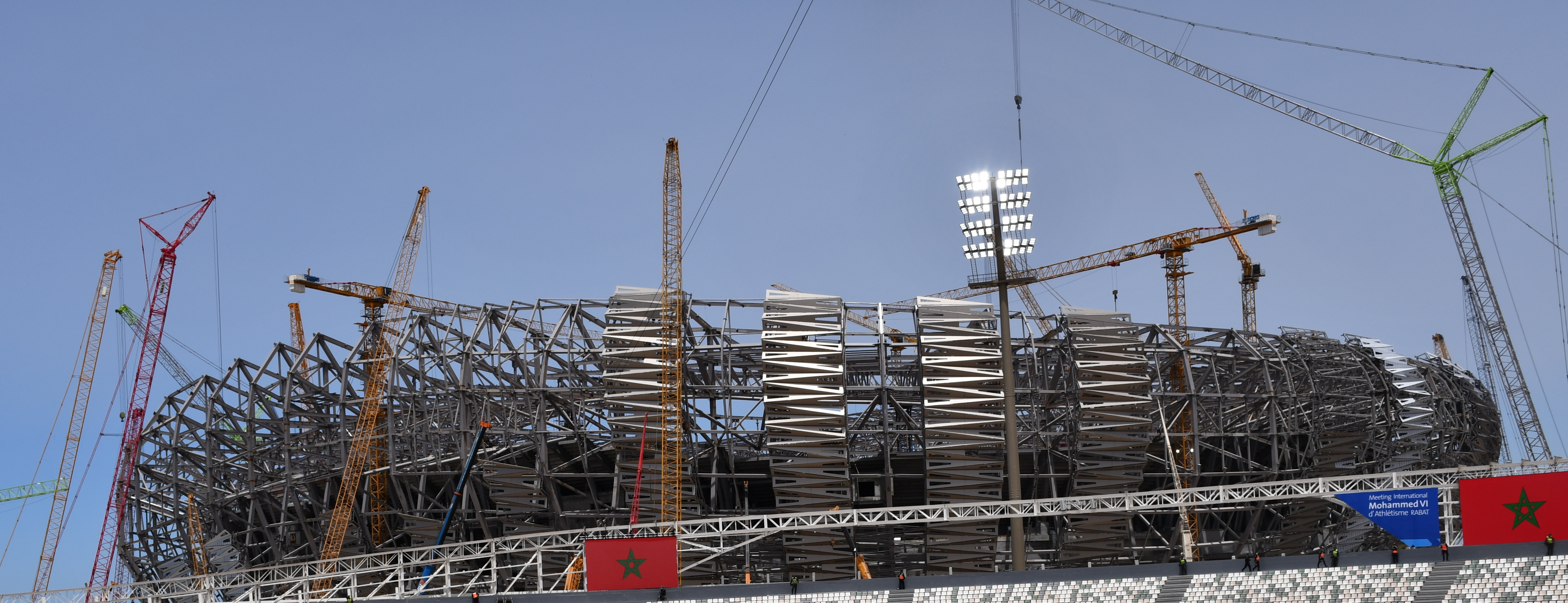
Stadium under construction

The Prince Moulay Abdellah Sports Complex is a reconstruction of the previous Prince Moulay Abdellah Stadium on the same site in Rabat, the capital city of Morocco. It has kept the name of the previous stadium, which was done in honour of Prince Moulay Abdellah of Morocco. The plan was for the previous stadium to be demolished in time for the 2025 Africa Cup of Nations, and to be a venue for the 2030 FIFA World Cup, the stadium will be able to seat 68,700 people. The new design facade was built with the imagination for the stadium to look like palm leaves, whilst the site will also accommodate an indoor multisport arena, an Olympic swimming pool, football training pitches and a car park. The project was planned to be built in merely eight months, making it the Guinness World Records for the fastest stadium construction ever in the world. Yet it took a full two years to complete, still potentially giving it the record for the fastest stadium constructed in the world today, according to some outlets.

Alongside the stadium in Rabat, Morocco is undergoing a nationwide sports infrastructure upgrade to its existing stadia as part of a project with a budget of MAD 9.5bn (1 billion USD). The stadiums upgraded or completely rebuilt are also located in Tangier (Ibn Batouta Stadium), Casablanca (Hassan II Stadium), Agadir (Adrar Stadium), Marrakesh (Marrakesh Stadium), and Fez (Fez Stadium), Al Hoceima (Mimoun Al Arsi Stadium) and are being constructed in two phases between 2023 – 2025 and 2025 – 2028. The project is approved by the Moroccan Government and managed by the Deposit and Management Fund (CDG).

=== Ownership ===
The new owners of the stadium are the Department of Sports, the Prefecture of Rabat, and the Royal Moroccan Football Federation. The project was founded as the National Company for the Construction and Management of Sports Facilities by King Mohammed VI of Morocco in 2008, with the plan of enhancing sports facilities in Morocco through the company Sonarges.

=== Architect and construction ===
Stadium exterior

The stadium was built by the Moroccan firm SGTM, with various other architects combined to work on building the multi-purpose venue, including Orange Atelier, a Moroccan firm which complied with the necessity for a FIFA-standard stadium to host matches during the World Cup, and Populous who has ensured the stadium is a state-of-the-art venue. The architects worked together to infuse a traditional Moroccan architectural approach and modern innovation by using sustainable resources for the build, making the venue eco-conscious and modern. Temsan are the steel contractors, whilst Imyas between 2024/25 were responsible for building the weather-resistant cladding covering the seated venue, it has been done to be architecturally pleasing and durable.

The Prince Moulay Abdellah Stadium rebuild began with demolishing the previous stadium in 2023. The construction for the new stadium is for a state-of-the-art football stadium with a roof covering the seating arrangement over three stands to accommodate a seating capacity of 68,700, over 40,000 sq feet. Technological features include the windbreak roof, solar energy sources, an advanced lighting system including high definition LED screens, advanced acoustic systems and a sound system to accommodate large-scale cultural events, football, and smart crowd management technologies. Also the football pitch is to FIFA specifications to host games in the World Cup. It is set to host a semi-final of the 2030 FIFA World Cup. Additionally, to FIFA requirements, two giant screens are installed at the north and south stands of the stadium.

== Football stadium specifications ==
The football stadium within the sports complex has allocated seating for VVIP and VIP boxes, VIP lounges, a VVIP lounge, four hospitality lounges, and a press box alongside the overall seating area. Then, on the field, the stadium has a hybrid natural turf combining natural grass and synthetic fibers. Then there are four changing rooms within the stadium with ergonomic equipment for the players. Also at the sports complex venue, there's a car park for 5,200 cars.

== Rabat Olympic Stadium ==
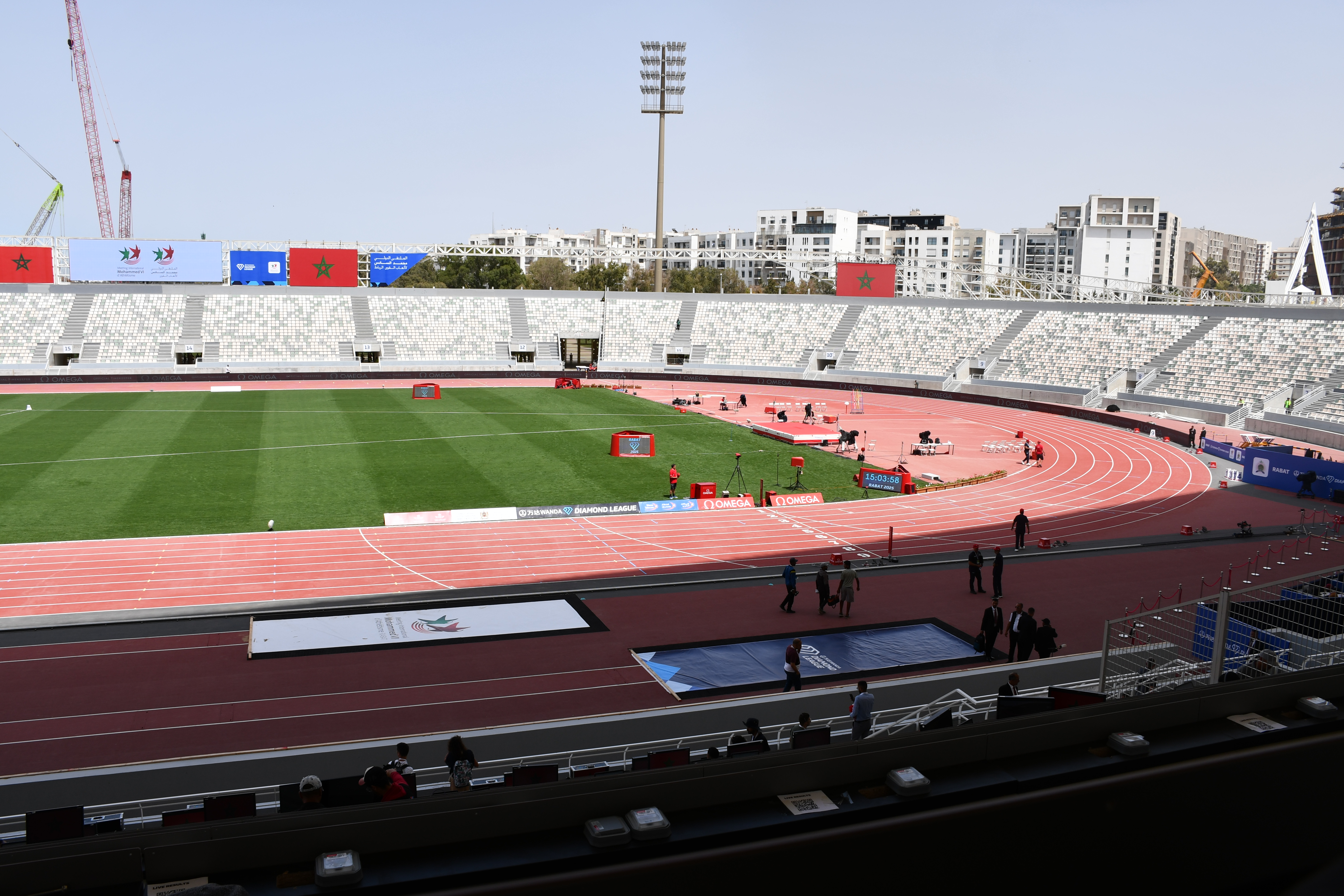
Rabat Olympic Stadium, part of the sports complex.

Alongside the new football stadium is an athletics stadium with a track and field named Rabat Olympic Stadium which was built with a capacity of 21,000 within the sports complex. The stadium is used for the yearly Rabat International Mohammed VI Athletics Meeting for the Diamond League.

== Transportation connections ==
The stadium's existing transportation infrastructure has received an upgrade to its connections in the local area and the country. Additionally, including expanding the existing roads to the venue, new roads and highways in the surrounding area of Rabat have been constructed to accommodate the growing number of fans accessing the stadium. Then, a new tramway connection was built directly connecting the stadium to the City of Rabat. The project was planned in two phases. Firstly, the laying of 23.7 km of new tracks by 2028, and then another 21.3 km of tracks built for 2030. Then a second train terminal is allocated to the Rabat–Salé Airport, which directly connects the capital city Rabat to the Moroccan cities of Kenitra and Marrakesh.

== International football matches ==
=== 2025 Africa Cup of Nations ===
Matches played in the Prince Moulay Abdellah Stadium for the 2025 African Cup of Nations:

Date	Local time	Team No. 1	Result	Team No. 2	Round	Attendance
21 December 2025	20:00	Morocco	2–0	Comoros	Group A	60,180
26 December 2025	21:00	Morocco	1–1	Mali	Group A	63,844
29 December 2025	20:00	Zambia	0–3	Morocco	Group A	62,532
4 January 2026	17:00	Morocco	1–0	Tanzania	Round of 16	63,894
9 January 2026	20:00	Cameroon	0–2	Morocco	Quarter-finals	64,178
14 January 2026	21:00	Nigeria	0–0 (a.e.t.) (2–4 p)	Morocco	Semi-finals	65,458
18 January 2026	20:00	Senegal	0–3 (awd.) (Note: Senegal won the match 1-0, but the result was overturned by CAF in March.)	Morocco	Final	66,526

== See also ==
- List of African stadiums by capacity
- List of football stadiums in Morocco
- List of association football stadiums by capacity

Preceded by Alassane Ouattara Stadium; Abidjan; Ivory Coast	Africa Cup of Nations; Final Venue; 2025	Succeeded by Kenya-Tanzania-Uganda
