= 2020–21 Super League of Malawi =

Football season in Malawi

Super League of Malawi
- Season: 2020–21
- Dates: 28 November 2020 – 16 October 2021
- Champions: Nyasa Big Bullets
- Relegated: Chitipa United; Ntopwa; Mzuzu Warriors
- Matches: 240
- Goals: 514 (2.14 per match)
- Top goalscorer: Hassan Kajoke (15 goals)
- Biggest home win: Nyasa Big Bullets 6–0 TN Stars (15 May 2021)
- Longest winning run: Silver Strikers (11 games)

The 2020–21 Super League of Malawi (known as the TNM Super League for sponsorship reasons) was the 35th season of the Super League of Malawi, the top professional league for association football clubs in Malawi since its establishment in 1986. Nyasa Big Bullets are the defending champions. It started on 28 November 2020 before it was postponed in March 2021 due to the COVID-19 pandemic in Malawi.

The season ended on 16 October 2021. Nyasa Big Bullets wins the third consecutive Super League title and the fifteenth overall.

== Teams ==
Sixteen teams competed in the league – the top thirteen teams from the previous season and the three promoted teams from the regional leagues: Ekwendeni Hammers, MAFCO Salima and Red Lions FC.

Other changes

- Mzuni FC (Mzuzu University FC) was renamed as Mzuzu Warriors.
- Be Forward Wanderers were renamed Mighty Wanderers during the season.

=== Stadiums and locations ===
Locations of the 2020–21 Super League of Malawi teams

Team	Location	Stadium	Capacity
Nyasa Big Bullets	Blantyre	Kamuzu Stadium	65,000
Silver Strikers	Lilongwe	Silver Stadium	20,000
Mighty Wanderers	Blantyre	Kamuzu Stadium	65,000
Civil Service United	Lilongwe	Civo Stadium	25,000
Karonga United	Karonga	Karonga Stadium	20,000
Moyale Barracks	Mzuzu	Mzuzu Stadium	15,000
TN Stars	Kasungu	Kasungu Stadium	6,000
MAFCO	Nkhotakota	Chitowe Stadium	1,000
Ekwendeni Hammers	Mzuzu	Mzuzu Stadium	15,000
Kamuzu Barracks	Lilongwe	Civo Stadium	25,000
Red Lions	Balaka	Balaka Stadium	3,000
Blue Eagles	Lilongwe	Nankhaka Stadium	5,000
Mighty Tigers	Nchalo	Kalulu Stadium	3,000
Ntopwa	Blantyre	Kamuzu Stadium	65,000
Mzuzu Warriors	Mzuzu	Mzuzu Stadium	15,000
Chitipa United	Chitipa	Karonga Stadium	20,000

== League table ==
Pos	Team	Pld	W	D	L	GF	GA	GD	Pts	Qualification or relegation
1	Nyasa Big Bullets (C, Q)	30	18	8	4	51	18	+33	62	Qualification for CAF Champions League
2	Silver Strikers	30	18	4	8	55	20	+35	58 (Note: Silver Strikers are the 2021 FDH Bank Knockout Cup winners.)	
3	Mighty Wanderers	30	15	10	5	38	20	+18	55	
4	Civil Service United	30	12	12	6	37	26	+11	48	
5	Karonga United	30	12	10	8	34	26	+8	46	
6	Moyale Barracks	30	12	10	8	30	32	−2	46	
7	Thomas Nyirenda Stars	30	12	7	11	28	41	−13	43	
8	MAFCO Salima	30	10	12	8	31	29	+2	42	
9	Ekwendeni Hammers	30	11	8	11	32	31	+1	41	
10	Kamuzu Barracks	30	10	11	9	29	31	−2	41	
11	Red Lions	30	9	8	13	27	31	−4	35	
12	Blue Eagles	30	7	11	12	29	29	0	32	
13	Mighty Tigers	30	8	8	14	24	32	−8	32	
14	Chitipa United (R)	30	9	5	16	23	41	−18	32	Relegation
15	Ntopwa (R)	30	5	6	19	28	55	−27	21	Relegation
16	Mzuzu Warriors (R)	30	4	6	20	18	52	−34	18	Relegation

Source: Soccerway
Rules for classification: 1) points; 2) goal difference; 3) goals scored.
(C) Champions; (Q) Qualified for the phase indicated; (R) Relegated
