= 2024 Super League of Malawi =

Football season in Malawi

Super League of Malawi
- Season: 2024
- Dates: 6 June 2024 – 7 December 2024
- Champions: Silver Strikers
- Relegated: Baka City
- Champions League: Silver Strikers
- Matches: 135
- Goals: 317 (2.35 per match)
- Top goalscorer: Isaac Kaliati (17 goals)
- Best goalkeeper: George Chikooka (10 clean sheets)
- Biggest home win: Mighty Wanderers 8–0 Mzuzu City Hammers (10 August); Creck 8–0 Baka City (10 August)
- Biggest away win: FOMO 0–3 Mighty Wanderers (14 April); Chitipa United 0–3 Nyasa Big Bullets (21 April)
- Highest scoring: Mighty Wanderers 8–0 Mzuzu City Hammers (10 August); Creck 8–0 Baka City (10 August)
- Longest winning run: 6 matches Silver Strikers (27 April – 2 June)
- Longest unbeaten run: 27 matches Silver Strikers (6 April – 27 November)
- Longest winless run: 10 matches Baka City (7 April – 24 June)
- Longest losing run: 5 matches Baka City (14 July – 10 August)
- All statistics correct as of 21 August 2024.

The 2024 Super League of Malawi (known as the TNM Super League for sponsorship reasons) was the 38th season of the Super League of Malawi, the top professional league for association football clubs in Malawi since its establishment in 1986. The season started on 6 June and ended on 29 December 2024.

On 30 November 2024, Silver Strikers won their 9th league title with two matches to spare, following a 1–0 victory against second placers Mighty Mukuru Wanderers.

== Teams ==
Sixteen teams competed in the league, the top thirteen teams from the previous season and three promoted sides from the regional leagues.

=== Changes from previous season ===
==== Promotion and relegation ====
▲ Promoted from Regional Leagues	▼ Relegated to Regional Leagues
Baka City; Creck; FOMO	Blue Eagles; Red Lions; Extreme

==== Name changes ====
- Ekwendeni Hammers were renamed to Mzuzu City Hammers.
- Kawinga FC were renamed to Creck Sporting Club.

=== Stadiums and locations ===
Team	Location	Stadium	Capacity
Baka City	Karonga	Karonga Stadium	20,000
Bangwe All Stars	Blantyre	Mpira Stadium	6,244
Chitipa United	Karonga	Karonga Stadium	20,000
CIVO United	Lilongwe	Civo Stadium	25,000
Creck	Lilongwe	Civo Stadium	25,000
Dedza Dynamos	Dedza	Dedza Stadium	6,000
FOMO	Mulanje	Mulanje Park Stadium	4,000
Kamuzu Barracks	Lilongwe	Civo Stadium	25,000
Karonga United	Karonga	Karonga Stadium	20,000
MAFCO	Nkhotakota	Chitowe Stadium	1,000
Mighty Tigers	Nchalo	Kalulu Stadium	3,000
Mighty Wanderers	Blantyre	Kamuzu Stadium	65,000
Moyale Barracks	Mzuzu	Mzuzu Stadium	15,000
Mzuzu City Hammers	Mzuzu	Mzuzu Stadium	15,000
Nyasa Big Bullets	Blantyre	Kamuzu Stadium	65,000
Silver Strikers	Lilongwe	Bingu National Stadium	41,100

== League table ==
Pos	Team	Pld	W	D	L	GF	GA	GD	Pts	Qualification or relegation
1	Silver Strikers (C)	30	19	10	1	58	17	+41	67	Qualification for CAF Champions League
2	Mighty Wanderers	30	17	7	6	57	19	+38	58	
3	Nyasa Big Bullets	30	14	13	3	42	20	+22	55	
4	Mzuzu City Hammers	30	13	9	8	31	32	−1	48	
5	Civil Service United	30	11	10	9	35	27	+8	43	
6	Creck	30	10	12	8	44	33	+11	42	
7	Karonga United	30	11	9	10	30	30	0	42	
8	Moyale Barracks	30	9	12	9	30	27	+3	39	
9	MAFCO	30	9	12	9	30	39	−9	39	
10	Kamuzu Barracks	30	8	13	9	30	29	+1	37	
11	Dedza Dynamos	30	7	15	8	32	31	+1	36	
12	Mighty Tigers	30	8	11	11	26	38	−12	35	
13	Chitipa United	30	7	8	15	35	46	−11	29	
14	FOMO (R)	30	8	5	17	20	38	−18	29	Relegation to regional leagues
15	Bangwe All Stars (R)	30	6	9	15	17	34	−17	27	Relegation to regional leagues
16	Baka City (R)	30	2	7	21	17	74	−57	13	Relegation to regional leagues

Source: Sulom Soccerway RSSSF
Rules for classification: 1) points; 2) goal difference; 3) goals scored.
(C) Champions; (R) Relegated

== Results ==
Home \ Away	BAK	BAN	CHI	CIV	CRE	DED	FOM	KAM	KAR	MAF	MGT	MGW	MOY	MZU	NBB	SIL
Baka City	—	2–0		0–0	1–1			0–0	0–1	0–0		0–2	1–2			0–2
Bangwe All Stars	3–0	—	3–0			2–1	0–1		1–1	0–1	0–0	0–0		0–0	0–2	
Chitipa United	4–1	4–0	—	1–3	1–1			4–1	4–1	0–0	0–1				0–3	1–1
CIVO United	3–0	1–1	4–0	—		3–0	1–0	1–2		0–0	0–0	0–1	1–0	3–0		0–2
Creck	8–0	1–0		1–2	—	2–0	1–0			2–1	3–1		3–2	1–2	1–1	
Dedza Dynamos	4–0	3–0	0–0		1–1	—	1–0	2–2	1–0	3–0		0–0			1–1	1–1
FOMO	1–1	1–0	1–0			1–1	—			0–1	0–0	0–3	2–1	2–1		
Kamuzu Barracks	4–0	1–0	2–0		2–2	2–0	3–1	—	2–1		0–0	0–1	0–0		0–0	2–2
Karonga United	1–0		1–1	1–1	1–1		3–0	0–0	—		3–1		2–0	1–1	2–1	0–1
MAFCO			2–0	2–2	1–2		1–0	1–1	2–0	—	2–0	0–0	1–1		1–1	
Mighty Tigers	4–1				1–0	1–1	2–2	2–3		2–3	—	1–2	2–0	1–0		2–2
Mighty Wanderers			2–0	3–0	3–0	3–1		1–1	1–0			—	1–2	8–0		
Moyale Barracks		1–1	1–1	3–0		0–0			1–0	2–1	1–0		—		0–0	0–0
Mzuzu City Hammers	2–1	2–0	1–0	1–0		2–1	2–1	1–0	0–1	1–1		2–0	1–1	—		
Nyasa Big Bullets	2–1	0–1		1–1	3–2		3–0				0–0	1–1	1–1	2–0	—	0–1
Silver Strikers		3–1	2–0		2–0		1–0		4–2	2–1	2–0	2–0	1–1	5–0		—

Updated to match(es) played on 28 September 2024. Source: Sulom
Legend: Blue = home team win; Yellow = draw; Red = away team win.
For upcoming matches, an "a" indicates there is an article about the rivalry between the two participants.

=== Results by round ===
Team ╲ Round	1	2	3	4	5	6	7	8	9	10	11	12	13	14	15	16	17	18	19	20	21
Baka City	L	L	D	L	L	D	L	D	L	D	W	L	L	L	L	L	D	L	L		
Bangwe All Stars	L	L	D	D	L	D	L	L	W	D	L	L	D	D	L	W	L	L	L	W	
Chitipa United	L	W	L	L	L	D	D	L	L	L	D	W	L	L	W	L	W	D	D	L	
Civil Service United	L	W	L	L	W	D	D	W	W	L	L	D	W	D	D	W	D	L	W	D	
Creck	W	W	L	L	D	L	W	D	W	D	D	W	L	D	W	W	W	L	D		
Dedza Dynamos	D	L	D	D	W	D	D	W	L	D	W	L	D	W	L	L	D	W	D		
FOMO	W	L	L	W	L	D	L	L	W	D	W	L	L	L	D	L	L	L	W	D	
Kamuzu Barracks	D	D	W	W	W	L	D	W	W	D	D	D	D	D	L	D	D	W	L	W	
Karonga United	W	L	D	W	D	L	D	L	L	W	L	W	L	W	D	L	D	L	W	W	
MAFCO	L	D	D	L	L	D	W	W	L	W	D	W	W	D	D	W	L	D	D	D	
Mighty Tigers	L	D	W	L	W	D	W	L	L	D	L	L	D	D	D	D	W	L	W	D	
Mighty Wanderers	D	W	W	D	D	W	L	L	W	W	W	L	W	D	W	W	D	W	W		
Moyale Barracks	W	L	W	D	D	D	D	D	W	L	L	W	W	D	D	D	L	W	D	D	
Mzuzu City Hammers	W	W	L	W	D	W	L	W	L	D	D	W	L	W	D	L	W	W	L	L	
Nyasa Big Bullets	D	D	W	W	D	D	W	D	L	D	D	D	W	L	W	D	L				
Silver Strikers	W	W	D	W	W	W	W	W	W	D	W	D	W	W	D	W	W	D	D		

Updated to match(es) played on 19 September 2024. Source: Sulom
W = Win; D = Draw; L = Loss

=== Positions by round ===
Team ╲ Round	1	2	3	4	5	6	7	8	9	10	11	12	13	14	15	16	17	18	19	20	21
Silver Strikers	2	1	2	1	1	1	1	1	1	1	1	1	1	1	1	1	1	1	1	1	
Mighty Wanderers	10	4	1	3	4	3	4	5	4	3	2	2	2	2	2	2	2	2	2	2	
Kamuzu Barracks	9	10	7	5	2	4	5	3	2	2	3	3	3	4	5	6	5	5	5	3	
Mzuzu City Hammers	6	3	4	2	3	2	3	2	3	4	4	4	4	3	3	4	4	3	3	4	
Creck	1	2	5	8	8	11	8	10	8	6	6	5	7	7	6	3	3	4	4	5	
Civil Service United	14	5	10	11	11	10	11	8	6	8	9	11	9	10	9	8	7	9	6	6	
Moyale Barracks	3	7	3	6	6	6	7	6	7	7	8	7	6	5	7	9	9	6	7	7	
MAFCO	11	12	13	15	15	15	13	12	13	12	11	8	8	8	8	7	8	7	8	8	
Karonga United	5	8	9	7	7	7	9	11	12	11	13	10	11	11	11	11	11	11	11	9	
Nyasa Big Bullets	8	11	6	4	5	5	2	4	5	5	5	6	5	6	4	5	6	8	9	10	
Dedza Dynamos	7	14	14	13	10	9	10	7	9	9	7	9	10	9	10	10	10	10	10	11	
Mighty Tigers	15	13	8	10	9	8	6	9	10	10	12	13	13	12	12	12	12	12	12	12	
FOMO	4	9	12	9	12	12	12	13	11	13	10	12	12	13	13	13	14	14	13	13	
Chitipa United	16	6	11	12	13	13	14	14	15	15	16	14	14	15	14	15	13	13	14	14	
Bangwe All Stars	13	16	16	14	14	14	15	16	14	14	14	15	15	14	15	14	15	15	15	15	
Baka City	12	15	15	16	16	16	16	15	16	16	15	16	16	16	16	16	16	16	16	16	

Qualification to the CAF Champions League
Relegation to Malawi Regional Football Leagues

Updated to match(es) played on 19 September 2024. Source: Sulom

== Season statistics ==
=== Scoring ===
==== Top scorers ====
As of 19 September 2024

Rank	Player	Club	Goals
1	(Malawi) Zeliat Nkhoma	Kamuzu Barracks	12
2	(Malawi) Isaac Msiska	Mzuzu City Hammers	10
2	(Malawi) George Chaomba	Creck	10
1	(Malawi) Isaac Kaliati	Mighty Wanderers	17
5	(Malawi) Blessings Mwalilino	Karonga United	7
5	(Malawi) Emmanuel Jnr Saviel	Civil Service United	7
5	(Malawi) Promise Kamwendo	Dedza Dynamos	7
5	(Malawi) Ramadhan Ntafu	Chitipa United	7
5	(Malawi) Saulos Moyo	Karonga United	7
10	(Malawi) Christopher Kumwembe	Mighty Wanderers	6

==== Most assists ====
As of 31 August 2024

Rank	Player	Club	Assists
1	(Malawi) McDonald Lameck	Silver Strikers	8
2	(Malawi) Gaddi Chirwa	Mighty Wanderers	6
2	(Malawi) Stanley Sanudi	Mighty Wanderers	6
4	(Malawi) Muhamad Biason	Civil Service United	5
4	(Malawi) George Chaomba	Creck	5
4	(Malawi) Uchizi Vunga	Silver Strikers	5

==== Own goals ====
As of 19 September 2024

Rank	Player	Club	Own goals
1	Aaron Chilipa	Creck	1
1	(Malawi) Chimwemwe Kalyala	Baka City	1
1	(Malawi) Ben Mbewe	MAFCO	1
1	(Malawi) Bright Mtondagowa	Mzuzu City Hammers	1
1	(Malawi) Robert Kolneli	Baka City	1
1	(Malawi) Steve Mkweza	MAFCO	1

=== Hat-tricks ===
As of 19 September 2024

Player	For	Against	Result	Date
(Malawi) Ramadhan Ntafu	Chitipa United	Karonga United	4–1 (H)	14 April 2024
(Malawi) Christopher Kumwembe	Mighty Wanderers	Civil Service United	3–0 (H)	23 June 2024
(Malawi) Festus Duwe	Civil Service United	Chitipa United	4–0 (H)	10 August 2024
(Malawi) George Chaomba	Creck	Baka City	8–0 (H)	10 August 2024

Note

(H) – Home; (A) – Away

=== Clean sheets ===
As of 31 August 2024

Rank	Player	Club	Clean sheets
1	(Malawi) George Chikooka	Silver Strikers	11
2	Lucky Tizola	Mighty Tigers	8
3	(Malawi) Christopher Mikuwa	MAFCO	6
3	(Malawi) Donnex Mwakasinga	Dedza Dynamos	6
5	Hastings Banda	Kamuzu Barracks	5
5	(Malawi) Simeon Harawa	Moyale Barracks	5
5	(Malawi) John Rahaman	Civil Service United	5
5	Maclean Mwale	Karonga United	5
5	(Malawi) William Thole	Mighty Wanderers	5

=== Discipline ===
==== Red cards ====
As of 21 August 2024

Rank	Player	Team	Red cards
1	(Malawi) George Chaomba	Creck	1
1	(Malawi) Chifuniro Mpinganjira	Dedza Dynamos	1
1	(Malawi) Clifford Chimulambe	Moyale Barracks	1
1	(Malawi) Peter Kasonga	MAFCO	1
1	(Malawi) Gabinho Daud	Bangwe All Stars	1
1	(Malawi) Francisco Madinga	Mighty Mukuru Wanderers	1

== Attendances ==
#	Football club	Average attendance
1	Nyasa Big Bullets	2,548
2	Mighty Wanderers	2,313
3	Silver Strikers	1,793
4	Dedza Dynamos	1,653
5	Creck SC	1,168
6	Kamuzu Barracks	1,144
7	Mighty Tigers FC	968
8	Mzuzu City Hammers	704
9	Moyale Barracks	697
10	MAFCO FC	608
11	Karonga United	539
12	FOMO FC	466
13	Civil Service United FC	385
14	Baka City	343
15	Chitipa United	298
16	Bangwe All Stars	225
