= 2012–13 Super League of Malawi =

Football season in Malawi

Super League of Malawi
- Season: 2012–13
- Dates: 26 May 2012 – 22 February 2013
- Champions: Silver Strikers
- Relegated: Bvumbwe Research; ESCOM United; Kabwafu United
- Matches played: 210
- Goals scored: 563 (2.68 per match)
- Top goalscorer: Vincent Chinthenga (18 goals)

The 2012–13 TNM Super League was the 27th season of the Super League of Malawi, the top professional league for association football clubs in Malawi since its establishment in 1986. It started on 26 May 2012 and was ended on 22 February 2013. Silver Strikers were the defending champions. The Bankers successfully defended their Super League title at goal difference a week before the end of the season.

== Teams ==
Fifteen teams compete in this season: the top twelve teams from the previous season and three promoted teams from the regional leagues. Kamuzu Barracks (Central Region Football League), Bvumbwe Research (Southern Region Football League) and Kabwafu United (Northern Region Football League) entered as the three promoted teams, instead of the three relegated teams from previous season, Cobbe Barracks, Zomba United and Embangweni United.

=== Stadiums and locations ===
Locations of the 2020–21 Super League of Malawi teams

Team	Location	Stadium	Capacity
Big Bullets	Blantyre	Kamuzu Stadium	65,000
Silver Strikers	Lilongwe	Silver Stadium	20,000
Mighty Wanderers	Blantyre	Kamuzu Stadium	65,000
Civil Service United	Lilongwe	Civo Stadium	25,000
Blantyre United	Blantyre	Kamuzu Stadium	65,000
Moyale Barracks	Mzuzu	Mzuzu Stadium	15,000
ESCOM United	Blantyre	Kamuzu Stadium	65,000
MAFCO	Nkhotakota	Chitowe Stadium	1,000
EPAC United	Lilongwe	Civo Stadium	25,000
Kamuzu Barracks	Lilongwe	Civo Stadium	25,000
Red Lions	Balaka	Balaka Stadium	3,000
Blue Eagles	Lilongwe	Nankhaka Stadium	5,000
Azam Tigers	Nchalo	Kalulu Stadium	3,000
Bvumbwe Research	Blantyre	Kamuzu Stadium	65,000
Kabwafu United	Mzuzu	Mzuzu Stadium	15,000

== League table ==
Pos	Team	Pld	W	D	L	GF	GA	GD	Pts	Qualification or relegation
1	Silver Strikers (C)	28	18	4	6	64	27	+37	58	Champion
2	Big Bullets	28	17	7	4	52	21	+31	58	
3	Blantyre United	28	16	3	9	54	45	+9	51	
4	Mighty Wanderers	28	14	6	8	39	27	+12	48	
5	Red Lions	28	13	7	8	32	30	+2	46	
6	Civil Service United	28	12	6	10	33	38	−5	42	
7	Blue Eagles	28	12	5	11	33	31	+2	41	
8	Moyale Barracks	28	11	5	12	35	31	+4	38	
9	EPAC United	28	10	8	10	39	36	+3	38	
10	MAFCO Salima	28	11	5	12	41	43	−2	38	
11	Azam Tigers	28	11	4	13	32	32	0	37	
12	Kamuzu Barracks	28	9	9	10	27	33	−6	36	
13	Bvumbwe Research (R)	28	7	3	18	34	53	−19	24	Relegation to regional leagues
14	ESCOM United (R)	28	4	7	17	28	60	−32	19	Relegation to regional leagues
15	Kabwafu United (R)	28	3	5	20	20	56	−36	14	Relegation to regional leagues

Source: rsssf.org
(C) Champions; (R) Relegated
