= List of football clubs in Malawi =

Malawi Football Clubs

The following is an incomplete list of association football clubs based in Malawi. For a complete list see Category:Football clubs in Malawi

== A ==
- Ascent Academy

== B ==
- BE FORWARD Wanderers (Blantyre)
- Blackpool FC (Lunzu)
- Blantyre United
- Blue Eagles FC (Lilongwe)
- Bullets FC (Blantyre)

== C ==
- CIVO United (Lilongwe)
- Chinamwali Stars (Zomba)

== D ==
- Dwangwa United (Nkhotakota)

== E ==
- Eagle Strikers (Mzuzu)
- EPAC United (Lilongwe)
- Escom United (Blantyre)

== J ==
- Juke Box FC (Mzuzu)

== M ==
- MAFCO (Salima)
- Moyale Barracks (Mzuzu)
- Mwanza Border Socials (Mwanza)
- Mwanza Madrid (Mwanza)
- Mwanza Academy FC (Mwanza)

== N ==
- Nkhata Bay United (Nkhata Bay)

== R ==
- Red Lions FC (Zomba)

== S ==
- Silver Strikers (Lilongwe)

== T ==
- Tigers FC (Blantyre)

== Z ==
- Zomba United (Zomba)
