= 2018 Super League of Malawi =

Football season in Malawi

Super League of Malawi
- Season: 2018
- Dates: 14 April – 24 December
- Champions: Big Bullets FC
- Relegated: Red Lions FC; MAFCO Salima; Nchalo United
- Matches: 240
- Goals: 540 (2.25 per match)
- Top goalscorer: Chiukepo Msowoya (16 goals)

The 2018 Super League of Malawi (known as the TNM Super League for sponsorship reasons) was the 33rd season of the Super League of Malawi, the top professional league for association football clubs in Malawi since its establishment in 1986. It started on 14 April and ended on 24 December 2018. Be Forward Wanderers FC were the defending champions of the previous season. Nyasa Big Bullets was crowned Super League champions for fourteenth time following a 3–0 win over Red Lions.

== Teams ==
Sixteen teams compete in this season: the top thirteen teams from the previous season and three promoted side from the regional leagues. Karonga United (Northern Regional Football League), Nchalo United (Southern Regional Football League), and TN Stars (Central Regional Football League) entered as the three promoted teams, instead of the three relegated teams from previous season, Wizards, Blantyre United and Chitipa United.

== League table ==
Pos	Team	Pld	W	D	L	GF	GA	GD	Pts	Qualification or relegation
1	Nyasa Big Bullets (C)	30	21	8	1	55	13	+42	71	Qualification to the CAF Champions League
2	Be Forward Wanderers	30	18	9	3	48	18	+30	63	
3	Silver Strikers	30	15	12	3	40	18	+22	57	
4	Masters Security	30	11	9	10	30	32	−2	42	
5	Civil Service United	30	11	9	10	35	38	−3	42	
6	Kamuzu Barracks	30	9	11	10	26	33	−7	38	
7	Karonga United	30	9	10	11	34	36	−2	37	
8	Mzuni	30	9	9	12	25	25	0	36	
9	Thomas Nyirenda Stars	30	9	9	12	37	45	−8	36	
10	Azam Tigers	30	9	8	13	38	40	−2	35	
11	Blue Eagles	30	9	8	13	31	33	−2	35	
12	Dwangwa United	30	9	8	13	35	44	−9	35	
13	Moyale Barracks	30	8	11	11	32	41	−9	35	
14	Red Lions (R)	30	7	12	11	28	37	−9	33	Relegation to regional leagues
15	MAFCO Salima (R)	30	6	11	13	28	38	−10	29	Relegation to regional leagues
16	Nchalo United (R)	30	4	8	18	18	49	−31	17 (Note: Nchalo United three points deducted for attempted match fixing in 2017 Carlsberg Cup)	Relegation to regional leagues

Source: Soccerway
(C) Champions; (R) Relegated
