= 2010–11 Super League of Malawi =

Football season in Malawi

Super League of Malawi
- Season: 2010–11
- Dates: 12 July 2010 – 27 February 2011
- Champions: ESCOM United
- Relegated: Mzuzu Juke Box; Lunzu Blackpool; Eagle Strikers
- Matches played: 210
- Goals scored: 520 (2.48 per match)
- Top goalscorer: Chikondi Mpulula and Luke Milanzi (18 goals)

The 2010–11 TNM Super League was the 25th season of the Super League of Malawi, the top professional league for association football clubs in Malawi since its establishment in 1986. It started on 12 July 2010 and was ended on 27 February 2011. Silver Strikers were the defending champions. ESCOM United clinched their second Super League title.

== Teams ==
Fifteen teams contested the league, the top twelve teams from previous season and three promoted teams from the regional leagues – MAFCO Salima (Central Region Football League), ESCOM Reserves (Southern Region Football League) and Mzuzu Juke Box (Northern Region Football League). They replaced EPAC United, Dwangwa United and Nkhata Bay United.

Other changes

- ESCOM Reserves was renamed as Blantyre United.

== League table ==
Pos	Team	Pld	W	D	L	GF	GA	GD	Pts	Qualification or relegation
1	ESCOM United (C)	28	17	7	4	58	21	+37	58	Champion
2	Silver Strikers	28	15	9	4	45	23	+22	54	
3	Moyale Barracks	28	15	6	7	47	31	+16	51	
4	Civil Service United	28	14	8	6	34	19	+15	50	
5	MTL Wanderers	28	13	7	8	43	32	+11	46	
6	Blue Eagles	28	13	7	8	34	30	+4	46	
7	Big Bullets	28	11	8	9	29	26	+3	41	
8	Tigers	28	10	7	11	36	36	0	37	
9	Zomba United	28	9	8	11	36	42	−6	35	
10	Red Lions	28	8	10	10	28	31	−3	34	
11	Blantyre United	28	9	6	13	31	41	−10	33	
12	MAFCO Salima	28	7	7	14	31	45	−14	28	
13	Mzuzu Juke Box (R)	28	7	4	17	23	43	−20	25	Relegation to regional leagues
14	Lunzu Blackpool (R)	28	6	6	16	22	39	−17	24	Relegation to regional leagues
15	Eagle Strikers (R)	28	4	4	20	23	61	−38	16	Relegation to regional leagues

Source: rsssf.org, Soccerway
(C) Champions; (R) Relegated
