= 2017 Super League of Malawi =

Football season in Malawi

Super League of Malawi
- Season: 2017
- Dates: 6 May – 22 December
- Champions: Be Forward Wanderers
- Relegated: Wizards FC; Blantyre United; Chitipa United
- Matches: 240
- Goals: 559 (2.33 per match)
- Top goalscorer: Matthews Sibale (16 goals)

The 2017 TNM Super League was the 32nd season of the Super League of Malawi, the top professional league for association football clubs in Malawi since its establishment in 1986. The season started on 6 May and concluded on 22 December 2017. Kamuzu Barracks were the defending champions of the previous season. Be Forward Wanderers won the title for the first time in eleven years, defeating Masters Security 4–1 at Balaka Stadium on 16 December 2017.

== Teams ==
Sixteen teams compete in this season: the top thirteen teams from the previous season and three promoted teams from the regional leagues. Chitipa United, Masters Security and Blantyre United entered as the three promoted teams.

Other changes

- Civil Service United, which has relegated after the previous season, takes the place of EPAC United.

== Standings ==
Pos	Team	Pld	W	D	L	GF	GA	GD	Pts	Qualification or relegation
1	Be Forward Wanderers (C)	30	21	6	3	46	16	+30	69 (Note: Malawi were represented in CAF competitions for 2018–19 season by Nyasa Big Bullets, the 2017 Super League of Malawi runners-up and Silver Strikers, the 2017 Super League of Malawi third place, as the 2018 Super League of Malawi and 2018 Malawi FAM Cup was not finished in time. Be Forward Wanderers, the 2017 Super League of Malawi champions and Kamuzu Barracks, the 2017 Malawi FAM Cup winners, chose not to enter.)	Qualification to the CAF Champions League
2	Nyasa Big Bullets	30	20	7	3	41	10	+31	67	Qualification to the CAF Champions League
3	Silver Strikers	30	16	13	1	39	16	+23	61	Qualification to the CAF Confederation Cup
4	Civil Service United	30	13	9	8	47	29	+18	48	
5	Blue Eagles	30	12	9	9	34	30	+4	45	
6	MAFCO Salima	30	12	8	10	31	31	0	44	
7	Moyale Barracks	30	12	8	10	37	41	−4	44	
8	Kamuzu Barracks	30	12	6	12	40	40	0	42	
9	Red Lions	30	11	7	12	34	28	+6	40	
10	Mzuni	30	10	7	13	32	34	−2	37	
11	Azam Tigers	30	6	14	10	30	31	−1	32	
12	Masters Security	30	7	10	13	38	50	−12	31	
13	Dwangwa United	30	9	4	17	31	46	−15	31	
14	Wizards (R)	30	7	6	17	26	40	−14	27	Relegation to regional leagues
15	Blantyre United (R)	30	6	6	18	32	57	−25	24	Relegation to regional leagues
16	Chitipa United (R)	30	4	4	22	21	60	−39	16	Relegation to regional leagues

Source: Soccerway
(C) Champions; (R) Relegated
