= 2011–12 Super League of Malawi =

Football season in Malawi

Super League of Malawi
- Season: 2011–12
- Dates: 9 July 2011 – 27 January 2012
- Champions: Silver Strikers
- Relegated: Cobbe Barracks; Zomba United; Embangweni United
- Matches played: 210
- Goals scored: 489 (2.33 per match)
- Top goalscorer: Ishmael Thindwa (18 goals)

The 2011–12 TNM Super League was the 26th season of the Super League of Malawi, the top professional league for association football clubs in Malawi since its establishment in 1986. It started on 9 July 2011 and was ended on 27 January 2012. ESCOM United were the defending champions.

The contest for the league title has been reduced to a three race with Silver Strikers, ESCOM United and Mighty Wanderers all in contention. Silver Strikers became champions for the sixth time, beating ESCOM United 1–0 on the final day of the season at the Kamuzu Stadium, while Mighty Wanderers lost 1–2 to Moyale Barracks.

== Teams ==
The league was contested by fifteen teams, twelve returning from previous season and three promoted teams from the regional leagues. EPAC United (Central Region Football League), Cobbe Barracks (Southern Region Football League) and Embangweni United (Northern Region Football League). They replaced Mzuzu Juke Box, Lunzu Blackpool and Eagle Strikers.

== League table ==
Pos	Team	Pld	W	D	L	GF	GA	GD	Pts	Qualification or relegation
1	Silver Strikers (C)	28	14	6	8	60	28	+32	48	Champion
2	ESCOM United	28	14	5	9	38	26	+12	47	
3	Mighty Wanderers	28	12	9	7	29	19	+10	45	
4	Civil Service United	28	13	5	10	36	28	+8	44	
5	Moyale Barracks	28	13	4	11	51	34	+17	43	
6	EPAC United	28	13	4	11	41	32	+9	43	
7	Blantyre United	28	11	9	8	40	33	+7	42	
8	Blue Eagles	28	12	6	10	30	32	−2	42	
9	Red Lions	28	10	11	7	30	24	+6	41	
10	Azam Tigers	28	12	4	12	41	39	+2	40	
11	Big Bullets	28	10	10	8	29	28	+1	40	
12	MAFCO Salima	28	10	9	9	20	31	−11	39	
13	Cobbe Barracks (R)	28	7	6	15	27	47	−20	27	Relegation to regional leagues
14	Embangweni United (R)	28	5	4	19	17	58	−41	19	Relegation to regional leagues
15	Zomba United (R)	28	6	4	18	21	51	−30	22	Relegation to regional leagues

Source: rsssf.org, Soccerway
(C) Champions; (R) Relegated
