= 2013 Super League of Malawi =

Football season in Malawi

Super League of Malawi
- Season: 2013
- Dates: 27 April – 28 December
- Champions: Silver Strikers
- Relegated: Mponela United; Envirom FC; Mzuzu United
- Matches played: 210
- Goals scored: 486 (2.31 per match)
- Top goalscorer: Ishmael Thindwa (18 goals)

The 2013 TNM Super League was the 28th season of the Super League of Malawi, the top professional league for association football clubs in Malawi since its establishment in 1986. It started on 27 April 2013 and was scheduled to conclude on 28 December 2013, but officially ended on 18 February 2014. Silver Strikers were the defending champions.

The match from the last round between Mighty Wanderers and Silver Strikers was interrupted due to the violence of their supporters. The match was postponed to be replayed for two times, first time on 5 January at Kalulu Stadium and second time on 26 January at the ZACC Ground in Zomba. Finally was replayed on 18 February 2014 behind closed doors at Kamuzu Stadium. Silver Strikers won 2–1 and clinched the third consecutive and eighth overall Super League title.

== Teams ==
Fifteen teams compete in this season: the top twelve teams from the previous season and three promoted teams from the regional leagues. Mponela United (Central Region Football League), Envirom FC (Southern Region Football League) and Mzuzu Super Eagles (Northern Region Football League) entered as the three promoted teams, instead of the three relegated teams from previous season, Bvumbwe Research, ESCOM United and Kabwafu United.

Other changes

- Super Eagles were renamed Mzuzu United after their first match.
- Kamuzu Barracks moved from Lilongwe to Dedza.

== League table ==
| Pos | Team | Pld | W | D | L | GF | GA | GD | Pts | Qualification or relegation |
|---|---|---|---|---|---|---|---|---|---|---|
| 1 | Silver Strikers (C) | 28 | 16 | 5 | 7 | 38 | 16 | +22 | 53 | Champion |
| 2 | Moyale Barracks | 28 | 15 | 5 | 8 | 47 | 23 | +24 | 50 | |
| 3 | MAFCO Salima | 28 | 14 | 7 | 7 | 41 | 31 | +10 | 49 | |
| 4 | Kamuzu Barracks | 28 | 13 | 8 | 7 | 42 | 29 | +13 | 47 | |
| 5 | Blue Eagles | 28 | 13 | 8 | 7 | 32 | 25 | +7 | 47 | |
| 6 | Mighty Wanderers | 28 | 12 | 9 | 7 | 26 | 22 | +4 | 45 | |
| 7 | Red Lions | 28 | 11 | 9 | 8 | 36 | 30 | +6 | 42 | |
| 8 | Big Bullets | 28 | 10 | 11 | 7 | 34 | 25 | +9 | 41 | |
| 9 | Tigers FC | 28 | 9 | 12 | 7 | 24 | 21 | +3 | 39 | |
| 10 | Civil Service United | 28 | 9 | 9 | 10 | 28 | 22 | +6 | 36 | |
| 11 | EPAC United | 28 | 10 | 6 | 12 | 38 | 36 | +2 | 36 | |
| 12 | Blantyre United | 28 | 8 | 6 | 14 | 27 | 42 | −15 | 30 | |
| 13 | Mponela United (R) | 28 | 6 | 8 | 14 | 29 | 43 | −14 | 26 | Relegation to regional leagues |
| 14 | Envirom FC (R) | 28 | 5 | 5 | 18 | 22 | 47 | −25 | 20 | Relegation to regional leagues |
| 15 | Mzuzu United (R) | 28 | 2 | 6 | 20 | 22 | 74 | −52 | 12 | Relegation to regional leagues |

Source: rsssf.org
(C) Champions; (R) Relegated
