= 2023 Super League of Malawi =

Football season in Malawi

Super League of Malawi
- Season: 2023
- Dates: 15 April 2023 – 3 December 2023
- Champions: Nyasa Big Bullets
- Relegated: Blue Eagles; Extreme; Red Lions
- CAF Champions League: Nyasa Big Bullets
- Top goalscorer: Clement Nyondo (16 goals)

The 2023 Super League of Malawi (known as the TNM Super League for sponsorship reasons) was the 37th season of the Super League of Malawi, the top professional league for association football clubs in Malawi since its establishment in 1986. The season started on 16 April 2023 and ended on 3 December. The Nyasa Big Bullets were the defending champions for the fourth consecutive season.

== Teams ==
Sixteen teams competed in the league, the top thirteen teams from the previous season and three promoted sides from the regional leagues: Bangwe All Stars, Extreme and Chitipa United.

== League table ==
Pos	Team	Pld	W	D	L	GF	GA	GD	Pts	Qualification or relegation
1	Nyasa Big Bullets (C)	30	16	12	2	49	19	+30	60	Qualification for CAF Champions League
2	Silver Strikers	30	16	9	5	41	18	+23	57	
3	Mighty Wanderers	30	15	10	5	35	16	+19	55	
4	Chitipa United	30	14	6	10	31	29	+2	48	
5	Kamuzu Barracks	30	13	7	10	32	23	+9	46	
6	Bangwe All Stars	30	11	9	10	37	36	+1	42	
7	Dedza Dynamos	30	9	11	10	30	38	−8	38	
8	Civil Service United	30	8	13	9	31	30	+1	37	
9	Karonga United	30	9	10	11	34	38	−4	37	
10	MAFCO Salima	30	10	7	13	29	36	−7	37	
11	Mighty Tigers	30	8	12	10	21	22	−1	36	
12	Ekwendeni Hammers	30	9	9	12	26	36	−10	36	
13	Moyale Barracks	30	8	11	11	32	32	0	35 (Note: Head-to-head points: Moyale Barracks 4, Blue Eagles 1.)	
14	Blue Eagles (R)	30	8	11	11	32	32	0	35	Relegation to regional leagues
15	Red Lions (R)	30	8	5	17	22	50	−28	29	Relegation to regional leagues
16	Extreme (R)	30	4	6	20	16	43	−27	18	Relegation to regional leagues

Source: Soccerway
Rules for classification: 1) points; 2) goal difference; 3) goals scored.
(C) Champions; (R) Relegated

== Statistics ==
=== Top goalscorers ===
Rank	Player	Team	Goals
1	(Malawi) Clement Nyondo	Dedza Dynamos	16
2	(Malawi) Lanjesi Nkhoma	Nyasa Big Bullets	14
3	(Malawi) Binwell Katinji	Civil United	11
4	(Malawi) Olson Kanjira	Kamuzu Barracks	10
4	(Malawi) Christopher kumwembe	Mighty Wanderers	10
4	Patrick Macheso	Silver Strikers	10

=== Assists ===
Rank	Player	Team	Assists
1	(Malawi) Stanley Sanudi	Mighty Wanderers	10
2	(Malawi) Patrick Mwaungulu	Nyasa Big Bullets	9
3	(Malawi) Stenie Davie	Silver Strikers	8
3	(Malawi) Lameck Gamphani	Dedza Dynamos	8
3	(Malawi) Chimwemwe Idana	Silver Strikers	8
3	(Malawi) Gastin Simkonda	Moyale	8

=== Clean sheets ===
Rank	Goalkeeper	Team	Clean sheets
1	(Malawi) William Thole	Mighty Wanderers	13
2	(Malawi) George Chokooka	Chitipa United	12
2	(Malawi) Innocent Nyasulu	Mighty Tigers	12
4	(Malawi) McDonald Harawa	Moyale	9
5	(Malawi) Pilirani Mapila	Silver Strikers	8
