= 2014 Super League of Malawi =

Football season in Malawi

Super League of Malawi
- Season: 2014
- Dates: 19 April – 6 December
- Champions: Big Bullets
- Relegated: Blantyre United; Chikwawa United; Karonga United
- Matches: 210
- Goals: 518 (2.47 per match)
- Top goalscorer: Gastin Simkonda (14 goals)

The 2014 TNM Super League was the 29th season of the Super League of Malawi, the top professional league for association football clubs in Malawi since its establishment in 1986. It started on 19 April 2014 and ended on 6 December 2014. Silver Strikers were the defending champions. Big Bullets clinched their eleventh Super League title following a 1–0 home win over Moyale Barracks on 29 November 2014.

== Teams ==
Fifteen teams compete in this season: the top twelve teams from the previous season and three promoted teams from the regional leagues. Airborne Rangers (Central Region Football League), Chikwawa United (Southern Region Football League) and Karonga United (Northern Region Football League) entered as the three promoted teams, instead of the three relegated teams from previous season, Mponela United, Envirom FC and Mzuzu United.

== League table ==
Pos	Team	Pld	W	D	L	GF	GA	GD	Pts	Qualification or relegation
1	Big Bullets (C)	28	18	8	2	45	18	+27	62	Qualification to the CAF Champions League
2	Moyale Barracks	28	16	5	7	44	25	+19	53	
3	Blue Eagles	28	15	5	8	51	30	+21	50	
4	Civil Service United	28	12	9	7	35	27	+8	45	
5	Silver Strikers	28	15	6	7	48	26	+22	51	
6	Red Lions	28	12	6	10	31	30	+1	42	
7	MAFCO Salima	28	11	8	9	50	38	+12	41	
8	Tigers FC	28	11	8	9	34	26	+8	41	
9	Mighty Wanderers	28	13	4	11	26	22	+4	43	
10	Kamuzu Barracks	28	10	6	12	30	30	0	36	
11	EPAC United	28	6	12	10	21	32	−11	30	
12	Airborne Rangers	28	8	6	14	36	48	−12	30	
13	Blantyre United (R)	28	5	6	17	19	44	−25	21	Relegation to regional leagues
14	Chikwawa United (R)	28	5	5	18	23	56	−33	20	Relegation to regional leagues
15	Karonga United (R)	28	4	4	20	25	66	−41	16	Relegation to regional leagues

Source: Soccerway
(C) Champions; (R) Relegated
