= Chiukepo Msowoya =

Malawian footballer

Personal information
- Date of birth: 23 September 1988 (age 38)
- Place of birth: Karonga, Malawi
- Height: 1.86 m (6 ft 1 in)
- Position: Forward

Team information
- Current team: Mighty Wanderers FC

Senior career*
Years	Team	Apps	(Gls)
2005	Eagles (Karonga)		(8)
2006	Red Lions		(15)
2007–2009	ESCOM United		(29)
2009–2010	Liga Muçulmana		
2009–2010	→ APR FC (loan)		
2010–2012	Orlando Pirates	11	(1)
2012	→ Platinum Stars (loan)	4	(1)
2012–2013	ESCOM United		(3)
2013–2014	Maxaquene		
2014–	Costa do Sol		
2015–2016	Big Bullets		(32)
2016–2017	Golden Arrows	6	(0)
2017–2021	Big Bullets		(37)
2022–	Mighty Wanderers FC		(5)

International career^{‡}
2006–	Malawi	90	(24)
- * Club domestic league appearances and goals as of 18 April 2024 ‡ National team caps and goals as of 15 March 2023

Chiukepo Msowoya (born 23 September 1988) is a Malawian footballer who plays as a forward for Malawian side Mighty Wanderers FC and the Malawi national team.

== Club career ==
Msowoya was the 2007 Malawi Premiere Division top scorer with 17 goals.

In January 2012, Msowoya joined Platinum Stars on loan until the end of the 2011–12 season. Upon returning to Orlando Pirates, he and the club reached an agreement to part ways. Msowoya returned to Malawi and joined his former club ESCOM United at the end August 2012.

He signed for Costa do Sol in February 2014.

On 19 January 2015, Chiukepo returned home to join Big Bullets.

== International career ==
Msowoya is a member of the Malawi national football team and participated at the 2010 Africa Cup of Nations in Angola.

=== International goals ===
Scores and results list Malawi's goal tally first.

#	Date	Venue	Opponent	Score	Result	Competition
1.	14 June 2008	Kamuzu Stadium, Blantyre	Egypt	1–0	1–0	2010 FIFA World Cup qualification
2.	20 July 2008	Lilian Ngoyi Stadium, Secunda	Lesotho	1–0	1–0	2008 COSAFA Cup
3.	5 September 2008	Stade National Gouled, Djibouti City	Djibouti	1–0	3–0	2010 FIFA World Cup qualification
4.	11 October 2008	Kamuzu Stadium, Blantyre	DR Congo	2–1	2–1	2010 FIFA World Cup qualification
5.	30 May 2009	Kamuzu Stadium, Blantyre	Rwanda	1–0	2–0	Friendly
6.	30 May 2009	Kamuzu Stadium, Blantyre	Rwanda	2–0	2–0	Friendly
7.	21 June 2009	Stade 28 Septembre, Conakry	Guinea	1–2	1–2	2010 FIFA World Cup qualification
8.	5 September 2009	Kamuzu Stadium, Blantyre	Guinea	1–1	2–1	2010 FIFA World Cup qualification
9.	5 September 2009	Kamuzu Stadium, Blantyre	Guinea	2–1	2–1	2010 FIFA World Cup qualification
10.	29 December 2009	Cairo International Stadium, Cairo	Egypt	1–1	1–1	Friendly
11.	4 September 2010	Stade 7 November, Radès	Tunisia	1–2	2–2	2012 Africa Cup of Nations qualification
12.	9 October 2010	Kamuzu Stadium, Blantyre	Chad	4–1	6–2	2012 Africa Cup of Nations qualification
13.	9 October 2010	Kamuzu Stadium, Blantyre	Chad	5–1	6–2	2012 Africa Cup of Nations qualification
14.	29 November 2012	Namboole Stadium, Kampala	Eritrea	1–0	3–2	2012 CECAFA Cup
15.	29 November 2012	Namboole Stadium, Kampala	Eritrea	3–0	3–2	2012 CECAFA Cup
16.	1 December 2012	Wankulukulu Stadium, Kampala	Zanzibar	2–0	2–0	2012 CECAFA Cup
17.	6 July 2014	Civo Stadium, Lilongwe	Mozambique	1–0	1–1	Friendly
18.	6 July 2015	Kamuzu Stadium, Blantyre	Uganda	1–0	1–0	Friendly
19.	6 September 2015	Somhlolo National Stadium, Lobamba	Swaziland	2–1	2–2	2017 Africa Cup of Nations qualification
20.	23 November 2015	Bahir Dar Stadium, Bahir Dar	Sudan	1–0	2–1	2015 CECAFA Cup
21.	25 November 2015	Bahir Dar Stadium, Bahir Dar	Djibouti	3–0	3–0	2015 CECAFA Cup
22.	29 March 2016	Kamuzu Stadium, Blantyre	Guinea	1–0	1–2	2017 Africa Cup of Nations qualification
23.	6 July 2022	King Zwelithini Stadium, Durban	Lesotho	1–2	1–2	2022 COSAFA Cup
24.	15 March 2023	Prince Mohammed bin Abdul Aziz Stadium, Medina	Bangladesh	1–0	1–1	Friendly
