= Charles Swini =

Malawian footballer (1985–2024)

Personal information
- Date of birth: 28 February 1985
- Place of birth: Blantyre, Malawi
- Date of death: 20 February 2024 (aged 38)
- Place of death: Lilongwe, Malawi
- Height: 1.90 m (6 ft 3 in)
- Position: Goalkeeper

Youth career
- 2004–2007: ESCOM United

Senior career*
| Years | Team | Apps | (Gls) |
| 2008–2012 | ESCOM United | 43 | (0) |
| 2012–2015 | Silver Strikers | | |
| 2015–2020 | UD Songo | 20 | (0) |
| 2020–2024 | Civo United | | |

International career
| 2009–2018 | Malawi | 35 | (0) |
- * Club domestic league appearances and goals

Charles Swini (28 February 1985 – 20 February 2024) was a Malawian footballer who played as a goalkeeper.

== Club career ==
On 23 January 2015, Swini signed for UD Songo on a season loan.

In March 2020, signed for Civo United.

== International career ==
Swini was a member of the Malawi national team and played for his country at the 2010 African Cup of Nations in Angola.

== Death ==
Swini died on 20 February 2024 at Kamuzu Central Hospital in Lilongwe, where he had been rushed to after collapsing at his home. He was 38, and had been battling kidney problems.
