= 1986 Super League of Malawi =

Super League of Malawi
- Season: 1986
- Champions: Bata Bullets

The 1986 Super League of Malawi was the first season of Super League of Malawi, the top professional league for association football clubs in Malawi.

== Overview ==
Top five clubs from Blantyre and Districts Football League (BDFL) and top three from Lilongwe and Districts Football League (LDFL) were invited to participate in the inaugural national league championship. Two clubs from Blantyre, Limbe Leaf Wanderers and Hardware Stars indicated they would not participate, but LLW changed its decision, while ADMARC Tigers replaced Hardware Stars. The other three teams in Blantyre were the Red Lions, Bata Bullets and Berec Power Pack who, through a new sponsorship agreement, changed to MDC United. The Lilongwe clubs were MITCO FC, Civo United and Silver Strikers.

The home and away format was played on three rounds with Gillette Nacet as the first sponsor.

The first game was played on 15 March 1986 involving MITCO FC and Admarc Tigers. MITCO FC won the game 1–0 a goal scored by Lameck Botha in the 21st minute there by becoming the first player to score a goal in the history of Super League of Malawi.

== League table ==
Pos	Team	Pld	W	D	L	GF	GA	GD	Pts
1	Bata Bullets (C)	21	10	8	3	30	16	+14	38
2	ADMARC Tigers	21	10	4	7	28	23	+5	34
3	Limbe Leaf Wanderers	21	9	4	8	26	27	−1	31
4	MDC United	21	8	6	7	20	17	+3	30
5	MITCO FC	21	9	3	9	22	26	−4	30
6	Silver Strikers	21	7	8	6	30	21	+9	29
7	CIVO United	21	5	10	6	21	24	−3	25
8	Red Lions	21	3	3	15	14	34	−20	12 (Note: Red Lions completed only 11 fixtures, failed to play in the remaining 10 games which were then awarded to their opponents with a 2-0 score.)

Source: Football Association of Malawi
Rules for classification: 1) points; 2) goal difference; 3) number of goals scored.
(C) Champions
