= Malawi FAM Charity Shield =

- Founded: 2016
- Region: Malawi
- Teams: 2 or 4
- Current champions: Nyasa Big Bullets
- Most championships: Nyasa Big Bullets (6)

The Malawi FAM Charity Shield is an annual association football competition held in Malawi, with proceeds going to charity.

The competition was initiated by the Malawi Football Association in 2016, to replace both the Malawi Charity Shield and the Tutulane Charity Cup. Initially a tournament between 4 teams it was changed in 2019 to be a single match between the reigning Malawi FAM Cup winners and the Malawi Premier Division league champions.

The event is held in March or April of each year, but did not take place in 2020 or 2021 due to the COVID-19 pandemic. Nyasa Big Bullets FC has won the Shield on every occasion since its inception.

== Winners ==
Year	Winners	Score	Runners-up
2016	Nyasa Big Bullets FC	2-0	Mighty Wanderers FC
2017	Nyasa Big Bullets FC	3-1	Kamuzu Barracks FC
2018	Nyasa Big Bullets FC	3-0	Silver Strikers FC
2019	Nyasa Big Bullets FC	1-0	Mighty Wanderers FC
2022	Nyasa Big Bullets FC	1-0	Silver Strikers FC
2023	Nyasa Big Bullets FC	2-1	Mighty Wanderers FC
