= Airtel Top 8 Malawi =

Football league in Malawi

Airtel Top 8
- Founded: Early 2000s (as BP Top 8)
- Country: Malawi
- Region: Malawi
- Confederation: CAF
- Number of clubs: 8
- Most championships: FCB Nyasa Big Bullets (3 titles)

The Airtel Top 8 is an annual knockout football tournament in Malawi, organized by the Football Association of Malawi (FAM) and sponsored by Airtel Malawi. It features the top eight teams from the previous TNM Super League season.

== History ==
The tournament was first introduced in the early 2000s as the BP Top 8. It was later rebranded after Airtel Malawi became the official sponsor. The tournament aims to reward top-performing Super League teams with a high-stakes competition, increasing visibility and revenue for the clubs and the league.

== Format ==
The competition is played in a knockout format, consisting of:

- Quarter-finals
- Semi-finals
- Final

All matches are single-legged, with extra time and penalties used if necessary. The final is typically hosted at the Bingu National Stadium in Lilongwe.

== Recent Finals ==
=== 2024 Airtel Top 8 Final ===
- Date: July 2024
- Venue: Bingu National Stadium
- Final: FCB Nyasa Big Bullets vs Silver Strikers
- Result: Bullets won the final, with a decisive goal from Ernest Petro.

=== 2025 Airtel Top 8 Final ===
- Date: 12 July 2025
- Venue: Bingu National Stadium
- Finalists: FCB Nyasa Big Bullets vs Silver Strikers
- Semi-final Results:
  - Silver Strikers 2–1 Civil Service United
  - Nyasa Big Bullets defeated Karonga United

== Past Winners ==
Year	Winner	Runner-up	Score	Venue
2021	FCB Nyasa Big Bullets	Mighty Wanderers	1–0	Kamuzu Stadium
2022	Mighty Wanderers	Blue Eagles	2–1	Bingu National Stadium
2023	FCB Nyasa Big Bullets	Silver Strikers	3–2	Bingu National Stadium
2024	FCB Nyasa Big Bullets	Silver Strikers	1–0	Bingu National Stadium
2025	FCB Nyasa Big Bullets	Silver Strikers	2–1	Bingu National Stadium

== Records ==
- Most Titles: FCB Nyasa Big Bullets – 4 titles
- Most Final Appearances: Silver Strikers – 4
- Most Successful Coach: Kalisto Pasuwa (FCB Nyasa Big Bullets)
- Highest Attendance: 39,000 – Final 2025 at Bingu National Stadium

== Media Coverage ==
Matches are broadcast live via:

- FIFA+
- MBC TV
- Airtel TV
- Facebook Live (FAM page)

== See also ==
- TNM Super League
- Football Association of Malawi
- FCB Nyasa Big Bullets
- Silver Strikers
