= FDH Bank Knockout Cup =

Football competition in Malawi

The FDH Bank Knockout Cup, also known as the Malawi FAM Cup, is the national association football cup competition in Malawi, on a knock-out-basis.

383 teams participated in the 2009 edition of the Standard bank FAM Cup.

== List of winners ==
Stanbic/Standard Bank Knockout Cup

Season	Winners	Runners-up	Result	Date	Venue
2005	MTL Wanderers	Admarc Tigers	1–1 (5–4/3? p)	12/11/05	?
2006	Not held				
2007	Silver Strikers	Escom United	1–0	14/10/07	Civo Stadium
2008	Moyale Barracks	Bullets FC	1–1 (5–4 p)	14/12/08	Kamuzu Stadium
2009	Tigers FC	Civil Service United	0–0 (7–6 p)	12/12/09	Silver Stadium
2010	Moyale Barracks	Civil Service United	0–0 (5–3 p)	29/01/11	Silver Stadium
2011	Blue Eagles	Moyale Barracks	2–1	11/12/11	?
2012	Mighty Wanderers	Silver Strikers	2–0	06/10/12	?
2013	Mighty Wanderers	Silver Strikers	1–0	02/11/13	Civo Stadium
2014	Silver Strikers	Tigers FC	1–0	30/08/14	Civo Stadium
2015	Civil Service United	Be Forward Wanderers	1–0	01/11/15	Civo Stadium

FISD Challenge Cup

Season	Winners	Runners-up	Result	Date	Venue
2016	Mighty Wanderers	Kamuzu Barracks	0–0 (4–3 p)	10/12/16	Civo Stadium
2017	Kamuzu Barracks	Moyale Barracks	1–0	09/12/17	Civo Stadium
2018	Mighty Wanderers	Silver Strikers	3–2	23/12/18	Bingu National Stadium
2019	Blue Eagles	Kamuzu Barracks	1–1 (4–2 p)	21/12/19	Civo Stadium

FDH Bank Cup

Season	Winners	Runners-up	Result	Date	Venue
2020	Not held				
2021	Silver Strikers	Ekwendeni Hammers	2–0	15/10/21	Bingu National Stadium
2022	Big Bullets	Big Bullets Reserves	3–1	23/10/22	
2023	Big Bullets	MAFCO	3–0	8/10/23	
2024	Blue Eagles	Big Bullets	0–0 (3–2 p)	1/9/24	
