= Chimango Kayira =

Malawian footballer

Personal information
- Date of birth: 28 September 1993 (age 33)
- Place of birth: Mangochi, Malawi
- Height: 1.65 m (5 ft 5 in)
- Position: Midfielder

Team information
- Current team: Big Bullets

Senior career*
Years	Team	Apps	(Gls)
2010–2012	ESCOM United		
2012–2014	Big Bullets		
2014–2016	Costa do Sol		
2017–	Big Bullets		

International career^{‡}
2011–	Malawi	60	(0)
- * Club domestic league appearances and goals as of 14:09, 7 August 2021 (UTC) ‡ National team caps and goals as of 14:09, 7 August 2021 (UTC)

Chimango Kayira (born 28 September 1993) is a Malawian international footballer who plays for Big Bullets, as a midfielder.

== Career ==
Born in Mangochi, Kayira has played for ESCOM United, Big Bullets and Costa do Sol.

He made his international debut for Malawi in 2011.
