= Davi Banda =

Malawian footballer

Personal information
- Full name: Davie John Banda
- Date of birth: 29 December 1983 (age 42)
- Place of birth: Zomba, Malawi
- Height: 1.74 m (5 ft 8 1/2 in)
- Position: Midfielder

Team information
- Current team: Kamuzu Barracks FC

Senior career*
| Years | Team | Apps | (Gls) |
| 2001–2006 | Zomba United | 40 | (0) |
| 2007–2011 | Red Lions FC | 63 | (11) |
| 2011–2012 | Black Leopards | 12 | (0) |
| 2012–2019 | Kamuzu Barracks FC | | |

International career
| 2006–2017 | Malawi | 44 | (4) |
- * Club domestic league appearances and goals

Davi Banda (born 29 December 1983 in Zomba) is a Malawian footballer who last played for Kamuzu Barracks FC in the Super League of Malawi.

== Career ==
Banda began his career in his hometown for Zomba United. After four years, he transferred to city rivals Red Lions in 2007. and he moved to kamuzu barracks fc in 2015

== International career ==
The midfielder was member of the Malawi national football team and was part of the 2010 African Cup of Nations team. On 11 January 2010 he scored his first goal for the national team against Algeria. He holds 17 caps below 6 FIFA national caps.
