= Maupo Msowoya =

Malawian footballer

Personal information
- Full name: Maupo Msowoya
- Date of birth: 14 May 1982 (age 44)
- Place of birth: Lilongwe, Malawi
- Height: 1.66 m (5 ft 5 1/2 in)
- Position: Defender

Team information
- Current team: ESCOM United
- Number: 5

Youth career
- 2001: MDC United

Senior career*
Years	Team	Apps	(Gls)
2002	MDC United	21	(0)
2003	Sammy's United	31	(0)
2004	Bullets FC	15	(0)
2005–	ESCOM United	48	(6)

International career
2002–present	Malawi	32	(0)
- * Club domestic league appearances and goals

Maupo Msowoya (born 14 May 1982 in Lilongwe) is a Malawian footballer, who currently plays for ESCOM United.

== International career ==
Msowoya played for the Malawi national football team and is part of the team competing at the 2010 African Cup of Nations.

== Personal life ==
Maupo is the elder brother of Chiukepo Msowoya who plays as striker for ESCOM United.
