= McDonald Harawa =

Malawian footballer

Personal information
- Date of birth: 25 December 1992 (age 33)
- Place of birth: Blantyre, Malawi
- Position: Goalkeeper

Team information
- Current team: Moyale Barracks

Senior career*
| Years | Team | Apps | (Gls) |
| 2011–2012 | Bullets | | |
| 2012– | Moyale Barracks | | |

International career^{‡}
| 2011–2015 | Malawi | 16 | (0) |
- * Club domestic league appearances and goals as of 7 August 2021 ‡ National team caps and goals as of 7 August 2021

McDonald Harawa (born 25 December 1992) is a Malawian football goalkeeper who currently plays for Moyale Barracks.
