= Peter Mgangira =

Malawian footballer

Personal information
- Full name: Peter Mgangira
- Date of birth: 6 October 1980 (age 46)
- Place of birth: Lilongwe, Malawi
- Position: Defensive midfielder

Team information
- Current team: Silver Strikers head coach

Senior career*
Years	Team	Apps	(Gls)
–2001	CIVO United	?	(?)
2002–2010	Silver Strikers	111	(17)
2003–2004	→ Jomo Cosmos (loan)	?	(?)
2010–	Blue Eagles FC	?	(?)

International career
1999–	Malawi	23+	(1+)
- * Club domestic league appearances and goals

Peter Mgangira (born 11 November 1980, in Lilongwe) is a Malawian footballer who currently plays for Blue Eagles FC. iN 2019 he was coaching at Silver Striker

== International career ==
He plays for the Malawi national football team and is part of the 2010 African Cup of Nations.
