= Diverson Mlozi =

Malawian footballer

Personal information
- Full name: Diverson Agogo Mlozi
- Date of birth: 13 September 1988 (age 38)
- Place of birth: Blantyre, Malawi
- Position: Striker

Team information
- Current team: Big Bullets FC

Youth career
- MAICC FC

Senior career*
Years	Team	Apps	(Gls)
2007–2008	MAICC FC		(?)
2008–2014	Big Bullets FC	?	(?)
2014–2016	Malanti Chiefs	?	(?)
2016–2017	Big Bullets FC	?	

International career
2009–	Malawi	1	(0)
- * Club domestic league appearances and goals as of 6 July 2009

Diverson Mlozi (born 13 September 1989) is a Malawian footballer, who currently plays for Big Bullets FC in Super League of Malawi.

== Club career ==
Diverson Mlozi debuted as a soccer player in 2008 with Big Bullets FC, a club in which he remains to date. The same year of his debut he managed to be the top scorer in the league with 14 goals. In 2012, he won the Carlsberg Charity Cup and the Presidential Cup with the club.

He signed for Malanti Chiefs in September 2014.

In 2016, return home to join Big Bullets.

== International career ==
He was capped once by the Malawi national football team, playing the game in 2009.
