= Stanley Sanudi =

Malawian footballer

Personal information
- Date of birth: 2 February 1995 (age 31)
- Place of birth: Dedza, Malawi
- Height: 1.76 m (5 ft 9 in)
- Position: Right back

Team information
- Current team: Mighty Wanderers

Senior career*
Years	Team	Apps	(Gls)
2012–2014	Mighty Tigers		
2015–	Mighty Wanderers		

International career^{‡}
2015–	Malawi	83	(1)
- * Club domestic league appearances and goals as of 19:32, 8 January 2022 (UTC) ‡ National team caps and goals as of 19:32, 8 January 2022 (UTC)

Stanley Sanudi (born 2 February 1995) is a Malawian footballer who plays as a right back for Mighty Wanderers and the Malawi national team. He was included in Malawi's squad for the 2021 Africa Cup of Nations.
