= Silver Strikers FC =

Association football club in Malawi

- Full name: Silver Strikers Football Club
- Nickname: The Bankers
- Founded: 1977; 49 years ago
- Ground: Silver Stadium, Lilongwe
- Capacity: 18,000
- Chairman: Victor Madhlopa
- Manager: Peter Mgangira
- League: TNM Super League
- 2025: TNM Super League, 3rd of 16
- Website: https://silverstrikers.mw/
Home colours	Away colours

Silver Strikers Football Club is a Malawian professional football club based in Lilongwe, currently playing in the TNM Super League, the top division of Malawian football. The club was founded in 1977 as a social team for staff at the Reserve Bank of Malawi, hence the club's nickname The Bankers.

They have won 9 Malawi league titles, making them the second most successful team in the competition, one Malawi National Championship, four Malawi FAM Cup and three Top 8 Cups.They had also won many now defunct cups in the 80s and 90s, anniversary celebration cups, and a Charity Shield in 2025.

Silver Strikers Ladies won the 2025-26 NBM Women’s Premiership league.

== History ==
=== The early years (1977–1989) ===
Reserve Bank of Malawi was headquartered in Blantyre and its football team played in the fourth tier of the Blantyre and Districts Football League (BDFL). The bankers promoted quickly to the 3rd Division and finished as runners-up gained promotion to the 2nd Division the following season. They went on to earn promotion to 1st Division in their maiden 2nd Division season, this time as Champions.

Reserve Bank of Malawi Head Office was transferred to Lilongwe, and with them went their football team. In Lilongwe, they started off the 1980 season in the Lilongwe and Districts Football League (LDFL) where existing greats of that region – Civo United, CCDC FC (Capital City Development Corporation) and Mitco FC, were already in fierce battles. It didn't take long for the bankers to establish themselves in the Central Region as the legendary Young Chimodzi was coaxed to join them from CCDC FC. Dickson Mbetewa followed from Mitco FC, through the advice of Chimodzi, Stain Chirwa, Donnex Gondwe and Davie Maleta amongst several others.

In 1985, the team won the Lilongwe and Districts Football League (LDFL) championship and as per tradition then had to participate in the National Championship which it won convincingly with seven wins in nine games. In addition to this, they reached two cup finals, losing both to Wanderers in the Kamuzu Cup by 2–0 in a replay after a 1–1 draw in first leg; and 1–0 in the Sportsman Cup Final. This was later to be rewarded by being nominated to participate in the East and Central African Challenge Cup in Dar es Salaam, Tanzania, where finished 3rd in a group with AFC Leopards, Young Africans, Kampala CC and Small Simba.

In 1986 season, finished 6th in the new established Super League of Malawi and once more, the bankers failed to win in a cup final as Wanderers once more defeated them in the Sportsman Cup final 1–0.

The following season they improved and finished 3rd, five points behind their Lilongwe rivals Civo United who grabbed the title. That season also saw them reach two more cup finals and this time they were crowned champions when they beat MDC United 2–1 in the Kamuzu Cup and Bata Bullets 1–0 in the Chibuku Cup.

In 1988, Silver Strikers lifted the Sportsman Cup, Press Cup and Challenge 555 Cup, but failed in the Kamuzu Cup final against Admarc Tigers 1–0.

=== The 1990s ===
In 1990, the bankers lost again to Admarc Tigers in the Kamuzu Cup final 3–2.

They reached the Kamuzu Cup final again in 1991, this time won against Civo United 1–0. Also, won and the Press Cup.

In 1992, they won, for the second time, the Chibuku Cup, as well as for the third time, the Press Cup.

They grabbed the Super League title in 1992–93 season at the 8th attempt and they retained the title the following season (1993–94). Silver Strikers FC won the third league title in the 1995–96 season.

In the 1990s the team had great players such as Jones Nkhwazi, John Maduka, Zex Rajab, Lovemore Fazili, Chitty Malema, Johnston Kumwenda, Davie Maleta, Charles Mulongo, Kondwani Mdumuka, Austin Nyondo, John Paipi, Ganizani Masiye, Harry Kumwenda, Richard Nyondo, Paul Mbisa, Francis Songo. Lawrence Waya joined Silver Strikers when he returned from the Emirati club, Al Jazira FC.

=== The 2000s ===
The 2000s began for Silver with an 11th place in the 2000–01 season. In the following season, Silver Strikers finished as runner-up in the Super League twelve points behind rivals Total Big Bullets and won the BP Top 8 Cup after Russel Mwafulirwa and Peter Mgangira goals led to a 2–0 victory over Red Lions in a final played at the Civo Stadium on 31 August 2002.

The 2002–03 season saw Silver Strikers finish 4th in the league, as well as reaching the quarter-finals of the Embassy Kings Cup, losing 1–2 to DWASCO.

In 2010–11 season, the bankers finished runners-up in the Super League and reached the Bingu Presidential Cup final, losing to Civo United 1–0 at Civo Stadium.

=== 2018 season ===
At the start of the 2018 season, Silver Strikers beat Be Forward Wanderers 2–0 to book the FAM Charity Shield Cup final, where they lost against Nyasa Big Bullets 3–0.

The bankers lost in the semi-final of the Airtel Top 8 Cup against Blue Eagles 1−0 in June and also exited from Carlsberg Cup in September losing to MAFCO 1−0 in Round of 16.

In the Super League finished third behind rivals Nyasa Big Bullets and Be Forward Wanderers. Silver Strikers also reached the final of the FISD Challenge Cup against Be Forward Wanderers at the Bingu National Stadium, in Lilongwe, where they were lost 3–2.

In 2018–19 CAF Confederation Cup it was eliminated in the preliminary round by gabonese team Cercle Mbéri Sportif after 1–1 on aggregate and 4–3 on penalties.

The team featured following players; GK − Brighton Munthali, Blessings Kameza, Charles Micheta; Defenders − Mike Robert, Chisomo Mpachika, Trevor Kalema, Yunnus Sheriff, Damian Kunje, Hygiene Mwandepeka, Herbert Wayekha, Mark Fodya, Mike Mtonyo; Midfielders − Duncan Nyoni, Lazarus Nyamera, Jack Chiona, Young Jr. Chimodzi ©, Victor Limbani, Timothy Chitedze, Ronald Pangani, Levison Maganizo, Kondwani Mwaila, Hadji Wali, Thuso Paipi; Forwards − Green Harawa, Binwell Katinji, Shenton Banda, Zikani Kasambara, Mphatso Phillimon, Newman Nyirongo, Collen Nkhulambe, Michael Tetteh.

=== 2019 season ===
On 29 June 2019, Silver Strikers lifted the Airtel Top 8 Cup beating Karonga United 1–0 with a goal by Khuda Muyaba. The squad of the bankers was composed of: Brighton Munthali - Young Jr. Chimodzi ©, Levison Maganizo (Kondwani Mwaila 65’), Herbert Wayekha, Sheriff Yinusa, Mike Roberts, Trevor Kalema, Thuso Paipi (Victor Limbani 65’), Duncan Nyoni, Khuda Muyaba and Michael Tetteh.

In August 2019, following the departure of Lovemore Fazili as assistant coach to Malawi national football team, the club appointed Abbas Makawa as the new head coach for the remaining part of the season. Makawa led the team to finish in 4th place and lost 4–0 to Blue Eagles in semi-finals of FISD Challenge Cup.

== Grounds ==
The club did not have its own football facilities and as such its home games were being played at Civo Stadium, Lilongwe Community Ground or Kamuzu Institute for Youths. The successes of the club left Governor John Tembo with no choice than approve the construction of the 20.000 capacity stadium for Silver Strikers, which was to be known as Silver Stadium.

== Women's team ==
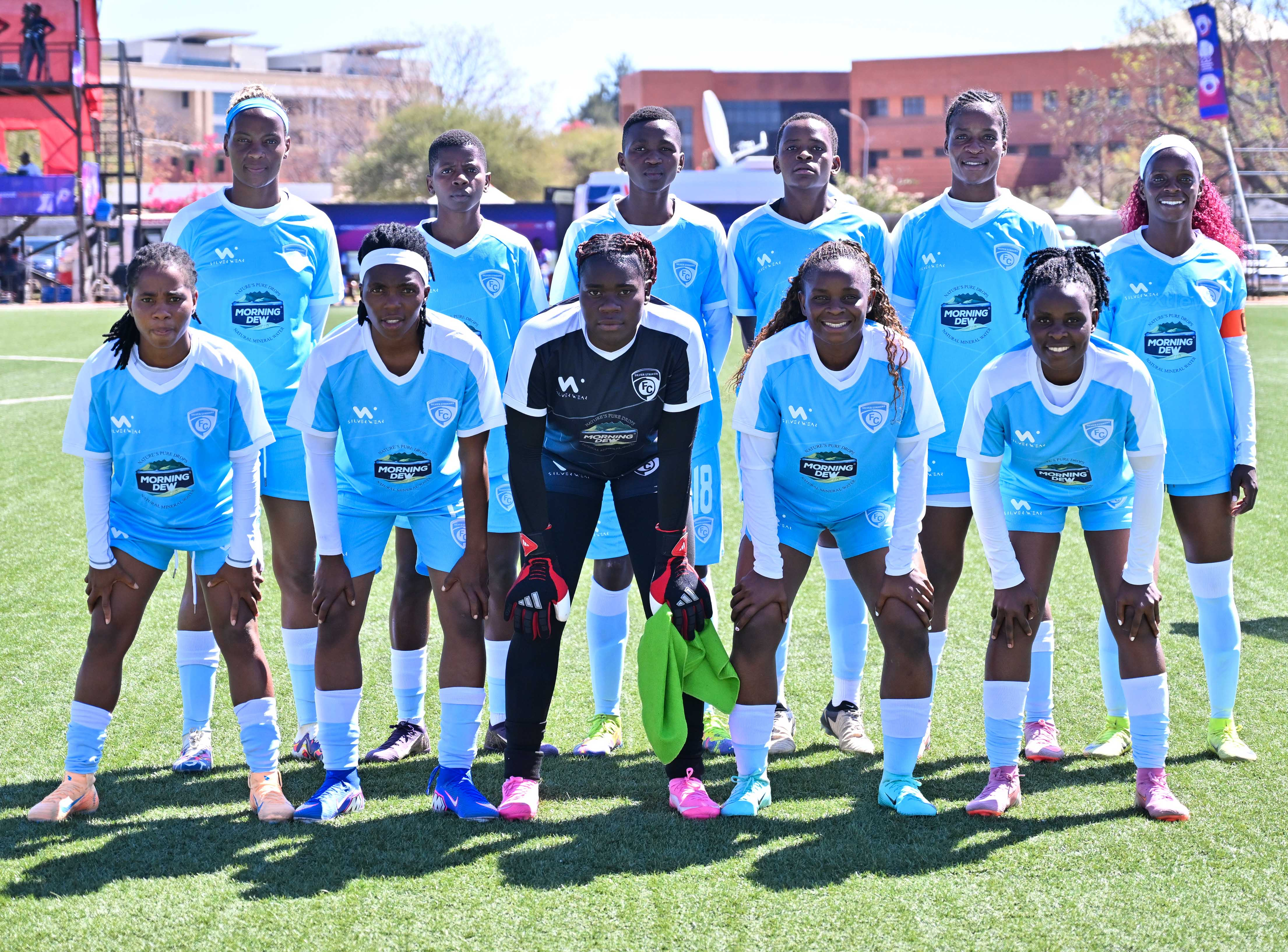
The Silver Strikers starting XI in 2026

What had been the DD Sunshine team became the Silver Strikers Ladies in 2023.

== Honours ==
Super League of Malawi

- Winners (9): 1993, 1994, 1996, 2008, 2009–10, 2011–12, 2012–13, 2013–14, 2024
- Runners-up (5) 2001–02, 2006, 2010–11, 2020–21, 2023

Malawi National Championship

- Winners (1) 1985

Malawi FAM Cup

- Winners (4): 2007, 2014, 2021, 2025
- Runners-up (3) 2012, 2013, 2018

BP/Airtel Top 8 Cup:

- Winners (3): 2002, 2017, 2019

NBS Bank Charity Shield

- Winners (1): 2025

Chibuku Cup:

- Winners (2): 1987, 1992

KAMUZU Cup:

- Winners (4): 1987, 1991, 1994, 1995

BAT Sporstmans Trophy

- Winners (2) 1988, 1995

CHOMBE TEA CUP

- Winners (1) 1997

CHALLENGE 555 CUP

- Winners (1) 1988

PRESS CUP

- Winners (5) 1988, 1991, 1992, 1997, 1998

== Players ==
=== Current squad ===
As of 25 April 2021

Note: Flags indicate national team as defined under FIFA eligibility rules; some limited exceptions apply. Players may hold more than one non-FIFA nationality.

No.	Pos.	Nation	Player
—	GK	MWI	George Chikooka
—	GK	MWI	Charles Thom
—	GK	MWI	Christopher Mikuwa
—	DF	MWI	Nickson Mwase
—	DF	GHA	Erik Atsiga
—	DF	MWI	Lumbani Nyondo
—	DF	MWI	Tatenda Mbalaka
—	DF	MWI	Innocent Shema
—	DF	MWI	Emmanuel Nyakupeta
—	DF	MWI	D. PEMBA
—	DF	MWI	Dan Sandukira
—	MF	MWI	Ernest Petro
—	MF	MWI	Innocent Mtonga
—	MF	MWI	Felix Demakude

No.	Pos.	Nation	Player
—	MF	MWI	Yankho Billiat
—	MF	MWI	Zebron Kalima
—	MF	MWI	Lameck Gamphani
—	MF	MWI	Festus Duwe
—	MF	MWI	Levison Manganizo
—	MF	MWI	Uchizi Vunga | Captain
—	MF	MWI	Lasuli Jali
—	MF	MWI	Zebron Kalima
—	ST	MWI	Andrew Josephy
—	FW	MWI	Mally Kasongo
—	FW	MWI	Emmanuel Allan
—	ST	MWI	Christopher Gototo
—	FW	MWI	Charles Chipala
—	FW	MWI	Chinsinsi Maonga

== Club officials/technical team ==
- Board Chairman: (Malawi)
- Head coach: (Malawi) Peter Mgangira
- Assistant coach: (Malawi) Mapopa Msukwa(1st), (Malawi) Green Harawa (2nd)
- Team manager: (Malawi) Young Chimodzi jr
- Goalkeeper Trainer: (Malawi) Philip Nyasulu
