= Henry Moyo (football) =

Malawian footballer (1946–2012)

Personal information
- Date of birth: 21 December 1946 (age 79)
- Place of birth: Ndola, Zambia

Senior career*
Years	Team	Apps	(Gls)
- Big Bullets F.C.

International career
1967–1975	Malawi	?	(?)

Managerial career
- ?–1984: Malawi
- 1984–?: Malawi
- * Club domestic league appearances and goals

Henry Moyo (21 December 1946 – 12 October 2012) was a Malawian football player, coach, and manager.

== Career ==
Moyo played as a center half for Bata Bullets F.C and the Malawi national team from 1968 to 1975, Moyo's talent as a footballer was identified while playing school football at Likuni Boys Secondary school by Bata Bullets Team Manager John Gilmore. He was in the second cohort of Bullets players mostly students alongside the likes of sensational Damiano'Dinky' Malefula, Frazer Chitenje and Kanjeza Kamwendo after the club secured sponsorship from Bata Shoe Company, At the time of joining Bata Bullets he found well established players the likes of Charles'Italy' Kagwa who was Malawi's first player to be crowned footballer of the year, Brasil Malila, John Mpesi and forward Yasin Osman who was poached from rivals Wanderers at a fee of 100 pounds, which was the most expensive Football transfer in Malawi in 1968, Goalkeeper Henry 'Mphaka' Kapalamula was another player he found at Bullets. During his playing days, he was nicknamed Bwanga of Zaire after his idol Raymond Tshimen Bwanga who featured for Congolese club TP Mazembe and Zaire national Football team. After retiring from both club and country, he was appointed assist national coach to Brazilian Wonder Moreira in 1975 and in the same year Malawi took part in their maiden Confederation of East and Central Senior Challenge cup hosted by Zambia. The Flames of Malawi lost to Kenya in the finals. In 1982, he was appointed deputy National coach to Ted Powell. In 1983, under Moyo Malawi qualified for their maiden AFCON hosted by Ivory Coast in 1984, Danny McLennan was appointed as the head coach and took charge of the team in Ivory Coast. In 1984 Moyo was appointed caretaker coach for a second time, after McLennan was fired for poor performance at the nations cup. The team reached the finals of CECAFA hosted by Uganda and lost to Zambia on post match penalties. In 1987 under Moyo the Flames qualified for the All-Africa Games after beating Zambia on the away goal rule, Malawi lost 3-1 away in Zambia and beat Chipolopolo 2-0 in Blantyre in the return leg through goals scored by Frank Sinalo and Holman Malunga. Moyo holds the record for the most wins as Flames coach at a round 56% win rate. He qualified Malawi for two international Tournaments, AFCON in 1984 hosted by Ivory Coast and All Africa games in 1987 hosted by Kenya, but never coached at the tournaments.

He quit the national Coach job in 1987. The nation was surprised to hear of the decision to retire as nation team coach through State owned MBC Radio though he had qualified the Flames for the All Africa games which were played at senior level at that time. He then rejoined Super League of Malawi outfit MDC United a team he managed before he was appointed national coach. In 1988 MDC United won the Super League championship without defeat and it was the first time in the history of Malawi for a team to win the league without conceding defeat. In 1990, he left his role as manager of MDC United and joined Portland Cement as Sales Manager.

From 1990 to 2003 he was a Confederation of Africa Football CAF match commissioner. From 1996-2004 he was appointed as sports adviser by former president of Malawi Bakili Muluzi.
