= Chikondi Mpulula =

Malawian footballer

Chikondi Mpulula (Born in 1993 in Malawi) is a Malawian footballer who currently plays as a striker for the Malawian football club, Blue Eagles FC of Lilongwe in the Malawi Premier Division. Chikondi became the 2010/11 Telekom Super League top scorer with 18 goals. His brilliant performance with Blue Eagles FC earned him trials with South African club, Bloemfontein Celtic and the 2011 Malaysia Super League champions, Kelantan FA.

Chikondi, alongside three other trialist appeared in a friendly with the Kelantan Reserve Team against Songkhla FC of Thailand which Chikondi scored in the 26th second. However, Songkhla FC later won the match 1–3.

Chikondi previously played for Blantyre United.
