= Balaka, Malawi =

Balaka, Malawi may refer to:

- Balaka District in the Southern Region of Malawi
- Balaka Township, Malawi, in Balaka District
