= William Thole =

Malawian footballer (born 198)

Personal information
- Full name: William Kilipota Thole
- Date of birth: 2 October 1998 (age 28)
- Place of birth: Malawi
- Height: 1.75 m (5 ft 9 in)
- Position: Goalkeeper

Team information
- Current team: Mighty Wanderers
- Number: 21

Senior career*
Years	Team	Apps	(Gls)
2017–2018	Mighty Tigers		
2018–	Mighty Wanderers	89	(0)

International career^{‡}
2020–	Malawi	5	(0)
- * Club domestic league appearances and goals as of 21:47, 23 December 2023 (UTC) ‡ National team caps and goals as of 21:47, 23 December 2021 (UTC)

William Kilipota Thole (born 2 October 1998) is a Malawian professional footballer who plays as a goalkeeper for the Malawian club Mighty Wanderers, and the Malawi national team.

== International career ==
Thole made his international debut with the Malawi national team in a 1–0 friendly loss to Zambia on 12 March 2020. He was part of the Malawi squad the 2021 Africa Cup of Nations.
