= Ramadhan Nsanzurwimo =

Burundian football manager (born 1966)

Personal information
- Date of birth: 1966 (age 59–60)
- Place of birth: Burundi

Managerial career
- Years: Team
- 1996–1997: Kiyovu F.C.
- 1997–2001: Big Bullets F.C.
- 2001: Mighty Wanderers F.C.
- 2002: Township Rollers F.C.
- 2003–2004: AmaZulu F.C.
- 2004–2005: Black Leopards F.C.
- 2005–2006: Tembisa Classic F.C. (assistant)
- 2006–2007: Fidentia Rangers F.C.
- 2008–2013: Durban Stars F.C.
- 2016–2017: Malawi

Ramadhan Nsanzurwimo (born 1966) is a Burundian football manager. He is the former caretaker manager of the Malawi national football team.

== Coach career ==
Ramadhan came to Malawi in 1997 from Kiyovu F.C. of Rwanda. From 1997 to 2001 he coached Big Bullets F.C. In 2001, he worked as coach for Malawi's Mighty Wanderers F.C. He left Malawi in 2002 for Mauritius and after one season joined Botswana's Township Rollers F.C. After Botswana one of his memorable achievement is when he led AmaZulu F.C. to the South Africa's top flight league PSL from National First Division. He also once worked with Malawi national football team during the time he was in Malawi. Then he coached the South Africa's Black Leopards F.C., Tembisa Classic F.C. (as assistant), Fidentia Rangers F.C. and Durban Stars F.C.
