= Mzuzu Warriors FC =

Association football club in Malawi

Mzuzu Warriors
- Full name: Mzuzu Warriors Football Club
- Nickname(s): Green Warriors
- Founded: 1997 as Mzuzu University FC
- Ground: Mzuzu Stadium; Mzuzu
- Capacity: 15,000
- Chairman: Donnex Chilonga
- Manager: Gilbert Chirwa
- League: TNM Super League
- 2019: TNM Super League, 12th of 16

Mzuzu Warriors Football Club is a Malawian football (soccer) club based in Mzuzu, Northern Region, currently playing in the TNM Super League, the top division of Malawian football.

== History ==
=== Mzuni FC (1997–2019) ===
The club was founded in 1997 as Mzuzu University Football Club and was commonly known as Mzuni FC, nicknamed the green intellectuals or the students.
After several years of competing in the regional championship, Mzuni FC earned the first promotion to Super League of Malawi at the end of the 2000–01 season, winning Mzuzu and Districts Football League.

The 2002–03 season was more than disappointing for supporters, the green intellectual finished 16th, with only 10 points and relegated back to the second level, where they will play for the next eleven seasons.
Mzuni FC were promoted back in the top flight after 2014–15 campaign, winning the Northern Region Football League, with one point ahead the second place, Chilumba Barracks.

The students remained a constant presence in the Super League for the next years, period in which were ranked as follows: 12th (2015), 9th (2016), 10th (2017), 8th (2018), 12th (2019).
Mzuni FC also reached the Airtel Top 8 Cup semi-finals in 2019 losing to Karonga United 4–5 on post match penalties at Mzuzu Stadium.

=== Mzuzu Warriors (A new beginning) ===
In December 2019, the club rebranded as Mzuzu Warriors following disagreements between the club and the management of Mzuzu University. Mzuzu University (Mzuni) Council announced withdrawal of sponsorship for the team.

== Ground ==
Mzuzu Warriors plays its home matches on Mzuzu Stadium, located in Mzuzu, Northern Region, with a capacity of 15,000 people.

== Honours ==
Northern Region Football League

- Winners (2): 2000–01, 2014–15
