= Collins Okumu =

Kenyan professional footballer

Collins Odhiambo Okumu (born 11 May 1997) is a Kenyan professional footballer who plays as a defender. He has featured for clubs in Kenya and Malawi, including Thika United, Nairobi City Stars, Bidco United, Posta Rangers, Thika United, and Nyasa Big Bullets FC.

While in Malawi, Okumu was part of the Nyasa Bullets squad that lifted the FDH Cup in October 2023

He featured for Kenya at the U20 level, and once turned out for the Kenya in 2018 in a friendly game against Malawi.
