= MDC United =

- Full name: Malawi Development Corporation United Football Club
- Nickname: The Soccer Saints
- Founded: 1976; 50 years ago
- Dissolved: 2004; 22 years ago
- Ground: MDC Stadium, Chilomoni, Blantyre
- Capacity: 20,000
Home colours	Away colours

MDC United FC (Malawi Development Corporation United Football Club) was an association football club based in Lilongwe, Central Region of Malawi. Established in 1976, the club were one of the founder members of the Super League of Malawi in 1986 season.

== History ==
The club was founded in 1976 in the capital Lilongwe as Berec Power Pack.

On 2 June 1984, Berec Power Pack lifted the Kamuzu Cup after coming from behind to beat CIVO United 3–2.

In the 1987–88 season, MDC United, under coach Henry Moyo, won the Super League championship and became the first team in Malawi to clinch the league title without losing any game.

The club remained in the top flight until the 2004 season after club officials announced the disappearance of the team due to sponsorship problems.

At an international level, he participated in a continental tournament, in the 1993 CAF Cup, where he was eliminated in the first round by South African club Hellenic FC.

== Honours ==
Super League of Malawi

- Winners: (1) 1988
- Runners-up (1): 1999–2000

== Performance in CAF competitions ==
Season	Competition	Round	Club	Home	Away	Aggregate
1993	CAF Cup	First round	(South Africa) Hellenic FC	1–1	0–6	1–7

== Former players ==
- (Malawi) Frank Sinalo
- (Malawi) Heston Munthali
- (Malawi) Clifton Msiya
- (Malawi) Lovemore Fazili
