= Isaac Kaliati =

Malawian international footballer (born 1998)

Personal information
- Full name: Isaac Kaliati
- Date of birth: 8 April 1998 (age 28)
- Place of birth: Blantyre, Malawi
- Height: 1.78 m (5 ft 10 in)
- Position: Winger

Team information
- Current team: Cape Town City
- Number: 44

Youth career
- Azam Tigers

Senior career*
Years	Team	Apps	(Gls)
2014–2015	Azam Tigers		
2015–2017	Mighty Wanderers		
2017–	Cape Town City		

International career^{‡}
2014–15	Malawi U20		
2015–	Malawi	10	(7)
- * Club domestic league appearances and goals as of 20:25, 31 March 2017 (UTC) ‡ National team caps and goals as of 12:59, 31 March 2017 (UTC)

Isaac "Chair" Kaliati (born 8 April 1998) is a Malawian international footballer who plays for TNM Super League of Malawi club Mighty Wanderers FC, as a midfielder.

== Club career ==
=== Azam Tigers F.C. ===
Kaliati began his career at Blantyre-based club Azam Tigers, first in the youth ranks before making his professional debut at 16. After a breakout season in the Malawi Premier Division as well as consistent performances for the Malawian U20 National Team, he was signed by Malawian champions, Mighty Wanderers F.C.

=== Mighty Wanderers F.C. ===
As one of Malawi's most high-profile "wonderkids", Isaac was signed by Wanderers over competing interest from Big Bullets FC. He was an influential player in both the 2015 and 2016 seasons, guiding Wanderers to domestic cup glory in 2015.

=== Cape Town City F.C. ===
At 18 years of age, Isaac signed for South African Premier League cup champions Cape Town City on 31 March 2017. The head coach then was Eric Tinkler.

== International career ==
He made his international debut for Malawi in a 1–0 victory over Uganda on 6 July 2015 at just 17 years old. He has since featured regularly for the national team and has been touted as one of the finest footballing prospects to come out of Malawi.

== Honours ==
=== Club ===
Mighty Wanderers

- Carlsberg Malawi Cup: 2015
- Airtel Top 8: 2022
- Castel Challenge Cup: 2024

=== Individual ===
- Malawian Young Player of the Year: 2015
- Malawian Player of the Year: 2016
- TNM Super League of Malawi golden boot award: 2024
