= Zebron Kalima =

Malawian footballer

Personal information
- Date of birth: 13 May 2002 (age 24)
- Place of birth: Lilongwe, Malawi
- Position: Winger

Team information
- Current team: Silver Strikers

Senior career*
Years	Team	Apps	(Gls)
2020–	Silver Strikers		

International career^{‡}
2021–	Malawi	1	(0)
- * Club domestic league appearances and goals as of 18:26, 9 January 2022 (UTC) ‡ National team caps and goals as of 18:26, 9 January 2022 (UTC)

Zebron Kalima (born 13 May 2002) is a Malawian professional footballer who plays as a winger for the Malawian club Silver Strikers, and the Malawi national team.

== International career ==
Kalima made his international debut with the Malawi national team in a 2–1 friendly win over Comoros on 31 December 2021. He was part of the Malawi squad the 2021 Africa Cup of Nations.
