= Khuda Muyaba =

Malawian footballer

Personal information
- Full name: Khuda Ike Muyaba
- Date of birth: 26 December 1993 (age 32)
- Place of birth: Mzuzu, Malawi
- Height: 1.62 m (5 ft 4 in)
- Position: Forward

Team information
- Current team: Scottland

Senior career*
| Years | Team | Apps | (Gls) |
| 2013–2017 | Moyale Barracks | | |
| 2018–2019 | Silver Strikers | | |
| 2019–2023 | Polokwane City | 62 | (24) |
| 2023 | Tishreen | | |
| 2024 | Richards Bay | 14 | (1) |
| 2024 | Ma'an | 5 | (2) |
| 2025 | Venda | | |
| 2025– | Scottland | | |

International career^{‡}
| 2017– | Malawi | 29 | (5) |
- * Club domestic league appearances and goals as of 8 April 2024 ‡ National team caps and goals as of 8 April 2024

Khuda Ike Muyaba (born 26 December 1993) is a Malawian footballer who plays as a forward for Scottland and the Malawi national team. He became top goalscorer of the 2019 Super League of Malawi with 21 goals.

A contract with Tishreen in the Syrian Premier League was terminated in 2023. He signed for Richards Bay.
