= Clement Kafwafwa =

Malawian footballer

Personal information
- Date of birth: 12 November 1979 (age 46)
- Place of birth: Malawi
- Height: 1.90 m (6 ft 3 in)
- Position: Defender

Senior career*
Years	Team	Apps	(Gls)
2000–2003	MDC United		
2003–2007	Holbæk B&I	82	(10)
2007–2012	Lolland-Falster Alliancen	74	(2)
2012–2013	NB Bornholm	13	(0)

International career
2000–2008	Malawi	39	(0)
- * Club domestic league appearances and goals

Clement Kafwafwa (born 11 December 1979) is a Malawian former international footballer who played as a defender. His strength was delivering long passes up the field.

During his playing career, Kafwafwa most notably played for Danish lower division clubs Holbæk B&I, Lolland-Falster Alliancen and NB Bornholm.

In January 2020, Kafwafwa was appointed team manager of the Malawi national team, a position he also held between 2015 and 2016 under head coach Ernest Mtawali.
