= Karonga Stadium =

Stadium in Karonga, Malawi

Coordinates: 9.9408°S 33.9024°E

- Interactive map of Karonga Stadium
- Location: Karonga, Malawi
- Owner: Government of Malawi
- Operator: Karonga City council
- Capacity: 20,000 (regulated capacity); 25,000 (seated capacity)
- Surface: GrassMaster
- Field size: 39 by 30 metres (42.7 yd × 32.8 yd)

Construction
- Groundbreaking: 10 January 2017; 9 years ago
- Built: 12 February 2014 – 15 July 2017
- Opened: 3 July 2017; 9 years ago
- Renovated: 2018–2023, 2024
- Cost: 5 Billion Malawi Kwacha
- Architect: Populous
- Project manager: Karonga District Manager

Tenants
- Nyasa Big Bullets FC; Mighty Wanderers FC; Malawi national football team (until 2017); Moyale Barracks (2019–present)

Karonga Stadium is a multi-use stadium in Karonga, Malawi. It is the venue for the TNM Super League clubs Karonga United and Karonga FC. The sitting capacity of the stadium is 20,000.

== Incidents ==
In 2018, the fire broke up in Karonga Stadium for unknown cause during the match of Karonga United and the Rumphi Pirates the 20,000 seat stadium was gutted by the flames.

The incident happened around 4pm soon after phase two of the game. The fire started at the VIP stand and the stadium managers suspected the problem occurred due to the electrical fault. Among notable escapees were the district chairperson of Karonga, Hurry Mwanyembe among others.

== See also ==
- Mzuzu Stadium
- List of Malawian Stadiums
