= Super League of Malawi =

Malawian association football league

FDH Bank Premiership
- Founded: 1986
- Country: Malawi
- Confederation: CAF
- Number of clubs: 16
- Level on pyramid: 1
- Relegation to: Malawi Regional Football Leagues
- Domestic cup(s): FISD Challenge Cup; Malawi Charity Shield
- International cup(s): CAF Champions League; CAF Confederation Cup
- Current champions: Mighty Wanderers (7th title) (2024)
- Most championships: FCB Nyasa Big Bullets (17 titles)
- Top scorer: Chiukepo Msowoya (129 goals)
- Website: sulommw.com
- Current: 2026 Super League of Malawi

Super League of Malawi, also known as the FDH Bank Premiership for sponsorship reasons, once known as the TNM Super League for sponsorship reasons, is the top football division in Malawi. Contested by 16 clubs, it operates on a system of promotion and relegation with the Malawi Regional Football Leagues.

Malawian mobile telecommunications company TNM sponsors the league with K65 million annually.

== History ==
It was created in 1986 and was first sponsored by Gillet Nacet. It was composed of eight teams: five teams from Blantyre and Districts Football League (BDFL) and three teams from Lilongwe and Districts Football League (LDFL). The eight inaugural members of the Super League of Malawi were Bata Bullets, Limbe Leaf Wanderers, MDC United, Red Lions, ADMARC Tigers, Silver Strikers, Civo United and MITCO.

== Competition format ==
There are 16 clubs in the Super League. During the course of a season (from April to December) each club plays the others twice (a double round-robin system), once at their home stadium and once at that of their opponents', for 30 games. The first place teams qualifies for the Confederation of African Football (CAF) Champions League or Confederation Cup and the three lowest placed teams in the Super League are relegated to the regional leagues. The winners of each regional league (Southern Region Football League, Central Region Football League and Northern Region Football League) promoted to the Super League.

== International competitions ==
=== Qualification for African competitions ===
==== Qualification criteria for 2024–25 ====
Association ranking for 2024–25 CAF Champions League and 2024–25 CAF Confederation Cup will be based on results from each CAF tournament (Champions League and Confederation Cup) from 2019–20 to 2023–24.

The winner of the Super League qualify for the subsequent season's CAF Champions League.

== Current clubs ==
The following sixteen clubs are competing in the Super League of Malawi during the 2023 season.

Team	Location	Stadium	Capacity
Ekhaya FC	Blantyre	Kamuzu Stadium	6,244
Blue Eagles	Lilongwe	Nankhaka Stadium	5,000
Chitipa United	Karonga	Karonga Stadium	20,000
Civil Service United	Lilongwe	Civo Stadium	25,000
Dedza Dynamos	Dedza	Dedza Stadium	6,000
Mzuzu City Hammers	Mzuzu	Mzuzu Stadium	15,000
CRECK Sporting	Lilongwe	Champion Stadium	25,000
Kamuzu Barracks	Lilongwe	Civo Stadium	25,000
Karonga United	Karonga	Karonga Stadium	20,000
MAFCO	Nkhotakota	Chitowe Stadium	1,000
Mighty Tigers	Nchalo	Kalulu Stadium	3,000
Mighty Wanderers	Blantyre	Kamuzu Stadium	65,000
Moyale Barracks	Mzuzu	Mzuzu Stadium	15,000
Nyasa Big Bullets	Blantyre	Kamuzu Stadium	65,000
Songwe United	Karonga	Karonga Stadium	20,000
Silver Strikers	Lilongwe	Bingu National Stadium	41,100

== Previous winners ==
Season	Champions	Runners-up	Third place	Winning manager
1986	Bata Bullets	ADMARC Tigers	Limbe Leaf Wanderers	
1986–87	CIVO United			
1987–88	MDC United			(Malawi) Henry Moyo
1988–89	ADMARC Tigers			
1989–90	Limbe Leaf Wanderers			
1990–91	Bata Bullets			
1991–92	Bata Bullets			
1992–93	Silver Strikers			
1993–94	Silver Strikers			
1994–95	Limbe Leaf Wanderers			
1995–96	Silver Strikers			
1996–97	Telecom Wanderers			
1997–98	Telecom Wanderers	Bata Bullets	Silver Strikers	
1998–99	Bata Bullets	Telecom Wanderers	Red Lions	(Burundi) Ramadhan Nsanzurwimo
1999–2000	Bata Bullets	MDC United	Silver Strikers	(Burundi) Ramadhan Nsanzurwimo
2000–01	Total Big Bullets	MTL Wanderers	MDC United	(Burundi) Ramadhan Nsanzurwimo
2001–02	Total Big Bullets	Silver Strikers	MDC United	
2002–03	Bakili Bullets	MTL Wanderers	MDC United	
2004	Bakili Bullets	MTL Wanderers	Silver Strikers	
2005	Big Bullets	MTL Wanderers	Silver Strikers	
2006	MTL Wanderers	Silver Strikers	Big Bullets	(Zimbabwe) Rahman Gumbo
2007	ESCOM United	MTL Wanderers	Silver Strikers	
2008	Silver Strikers	Big Bullets	ESCOM United	
2009–10	Silver Strikers	ESCOM United	MTL Wanderers	(Malawi) Young Chimodzi
2010–11	ESCOM United	Silver Strikers	Moyale Barracks	(Malawi) Charles Manda
2011–12	Silver Strikers	ESCOM United	Mighty Wanderers	(Malawi) Thom Mkorongo
2012–13	Silver Strikers	Big Bullets	Blantyre United	(Malawi) Franco Ndawa
2013	Silver Strikers	Moyale Barracks	MAFCO Salima	(Malawi) Stain Chirwa
2014	Big Bullets	Moyale Barracks	Blue Eagles	(Malawi) Elijah Kananji
2015	Nyasa Big Bullets	MAFCO Salima	Blue Eagles	(Malawi) Mabvuto Lungu
2016	Kamuzu Barracks	Nyasa Big Bullets	Silver Strikers	(Malawi) Billy Phambala
2017	Be Forward Wanderers	Nyasa Big Bullets	Silver Strikers	(Malawi) Yasin Osman
2018	Nyasa Big Bullets	Be Forward Wanderers	Silver Strikers	(Zimbabwe) Callisto Pasuwa
2019	Nyasa Big Bullets	Be Forward Wanderers	Blue Eagles	(Zimbabwe) Callisto Pasuwa
2020–21	Nyasa Big Bullets	Silver Strikers	Mighty Wanderers	(Zimbabwe) Callisto Pasuwa
2022	Nyasa Big Bullets	Blue Eagles	Kamuzu Barracks	(Zimbabwe) Callisto Pasuwa
2023	FCB Nyasa Big Bullets	Silver Strikers	Mighty Mukuru Wanderers	(Zimbabwe) Callisto Pasuwa
2024	Silver Strikers	Mighty Wanderers	Nyasa Big Bullets	(Malawi) Peter Mponda
2025	Mighty Wanderers	Big Bullets	Silver Strikers	(Malawi) Bob Mpinganjira

== Performance by club ==
Club	Titles	Winning seasons
Nyasa Big Bullets (Note: Includes Bata, Total, Bakili)	17	1986, 1990–91, 1991–92, 1998–99, 1999–2000, 2000–01, 2001–02, 2002–03, 2004, 2005, 2014, 2015, 2018, 2019, 2020–21, 2022, 2023
Silver Strikers	9	1992–93, 1993–94, 1995–96, 2008, 2009–10, 2011–12, 2012–13, 2013, 2024
Mighty Wanderers (Note: Includes Limbe Leaf, Telecom, MTL, Be Forward)	7	1989–90, 1994–95, 1996–97, 1997–98, 2006, 2017, 2025
ESCOM United	2	2007, 2010–11
ADMARC Tigers	1	1988–89
CIVO United	1	1986–87
MDC United	1	1987–88
Kamuzu Barracks	1	2016

== Top goalscorers ==
Year	Top scorers	Team	Goals
2001–02	(Malawi) Heston Munthali	MDC United	24
2002–03	(Malawi) Ganizani Malunga	Bakili Bullets	28
2004	(Malawi) Rodrick Douglas	Illovo	18
2005–06	(Malawi) Aggrey Kanyenda	Mighty Wanderers	26
2006	(Malawi) Aggrey Kanyenda	Mighty Wanderers	18
2007	(Malawi) Chiukepo Msowoya	ESCOM United	17
2008	(Malawi) Diverson Mlozi	Bullets	14
2009–10	(Malawi) Tony Chitsulo	Silver Strikers	18
2010–11	(Malawi) Chikondi Mpulula (Malawi) Luke Milanzi	Blantyre United & Blue Eagles; ESCOM United	18
2011–12	(Malawi) Ishmael Thindwa	EPAC United	18
2012–13	(Malawi) Vincent Chinthenga	Bvumbwe Research	18
2013	(Malawi) Ishmael Thindwa	EPAC United	18
2014	(Malawi) Gastin Simkonda	Moyale Barracks	17
2015	(Malawi) Innocent Bokosi (Malawi) Chiukepo Msowoya	Red Lions; Bullets	14
2016	(Malawi) Richard Mbulu	MAFCO Salima	19
2017	(Malawi) Matthews Sibale	Silver Strikers	16
2018	(Malawi) Chiukepo Msowoya	Bullets	16
2019	(Malawi) Khuda Muyaba	Silver Strikers	21
2020–21	(Malawi) Hassan Kajoke	Nyasa Big Bullets	15
2022	(Nigeria) Babatunde Adepoju	Nyasa Big Bullets	18
2023	(Malawi) Clement Nyondo	Dedza Dynamos	16
2024	(Malawi) Isaac Kaliati	Mighty Wanderers	17
2025	(Nigeria) Babatunde Adepoju	Mighty Wanderers	15

=== All-time goalscorers ===
Rank	Player	Goals	Years
1	(Malawi) Chiukepo Msowoya	129	2005
2	(Malawi) Gastin Simkonda	116	2009
