= Silver Stadium, Lilongwe =

Building in Africa

Coordinates: 13°57′13″S 33°46′11″E

Silver Stadium
- Pa Bwandiro
- Interactive map of Silver Stadium
- Full name: Silver Stadium
- Location: Lilongwe, Malawi
- Owner: Reserve Bank of Malawi
- Capacity: 18,000
- Surface: Natural grass

Tenant
- Silver Strikers

Silver Stadium is a multi-use stadium in Lilongwe, Malawi. It is currently used mostly for football matches, on club level by Silver Strikers of the Super League of Malawi. The stadium has a capacity of 18,000 spectators.
