= Masters Security FC =

- Full name: Masters Security Football Club
- Nickname: Rangers
- Founded: 2010
- Ground: Dedza Stadium; Dedza
- Capacity: 6,000
- Chairman: Alfred Gangata
- Manager: Peter Mponda
- League: TNM Super League
- 2019: TNM Super League, 4th of 16 (relegated)

Masters Security Football Club is a Malawian football club based in Lilongwe and currently playing in the TNM Super League, the top division of Malawian football.

== History ==
It was founded in 2010 in the capital Lilongwe with the name Masters Security Rangers and is owned by the company Masters Security Services, dedicated to the private security service.

The club was promoted to the Super League in 2016.

In 2018, has managed to won Malawi Carlsberg Cup and qualify to CAF Confederation Cup.

== Honours ==
Malawi Carlsberg Cup:

- Winners (1): 2018

Central Region Football League

- Winners (1): 2016

== Performance in CAF competitions ==
- CAF Confederation Cup: 2 appearances

2018 – Preliminary Round
2019–20 – Preliminary Round
