= Eagle Strikers FC =

Association football club in Malawi

Eagle Strikers
- Full name: Eagle Strikers Football Club
- Ground: Mzuzu Stadium; Mzuzu
- Capacity: 10,000

Eagle Strikers Football Club was a Malawian football (soccer) club based in Mzuzu, Northern Region of Malawi who played in the TNM Super League, the top division of Malawian football.

The team was sponsored by the Malawi Police and for some time it was called "Nkhata Bay Police". The first mention of the performance of the team refers to the 1997–98 season, when it took the last 16th place in the Super League of Malawi and left it. In 2006, the team won the Northern Region Football League, the Second Division of Malawi, and was able to get a ticket to the top division.

The Eagle Strikers were a member of the Super League of Malawi for four seasons. At the end of the 2010–11 season, the team took the last 15th place and flew out of the tournament. In 2013, it became known that the Malawi Police stopped funding the club.

== Stadium ==
The club was played at the 10,000 capacity Mzuzu Stadium.
