= Chitipa United FC =

Malawian football club

Chitipa United
- Full name: Chitipa United Football Club
- Nickname: The Lions of Fort Hill
- Ground: Karonga Stadium, Karonga
- Capacity: 20,000
- Chairman: Christopher Mwale
- Manager: Gift Nathaniel Mkamanga
- League: Super League of Malawi
- 2025: Super League, 11th of 16

Chitipa United Football Club are a Malawian football (soccer) club based in Chitipa, Northern Region and currently playing in the Super League of Malawi, the first tier of the Malawian football.

== History ==
In 2016, Chitipa United promoted, as Northern Region Football League champions, to the top flight for the first time in their history.

In their first season in the Super League of Malawi, "The Lions of Fort Hill", finished in 16th position and return to Second Division.

In 2018, Chitipa United, won again the Northern Region Football League returned to the TNM Super League.

Despite to earn promotion, head coach Robert Mzinza was replaced before the start of the 2019 season with Alex Ngwira, who led Chitipa to avoid relegation finishing thirteen in the league table.

After the poor start of the 2020–21 season, with just four points from nine matches, Ngwira quits and was replaced with Christopher Nyambose, but he was unable to prevent relegation to Second Division.

Gift Nathaniel Mkamanga led the club to an immediate return to the Super League as crowned Northern Region Football League champions at the end of the 2022 season.

== Honours ==
Northern Region Football League

- Winners (3): 2016, 2018, 2022
