= Blantyre United FC =

Blantyre United
- Full name: Blantyre United Football Club
- Founded: 2008 as ESCOM Reserves
- Dissolved: 2018
- Ground: Kamuzu Stadium; Blantyre, Malawi
- Capacity: 50,000
Third colours

Blantyre United Football Club was a Malawian football (soccer) club based in Blantyre founded in 2008 and dissolved in 2018.

== History ==
The club was founded in 2008 as a reserve side for Escom United.

In 2010, after won Southern Regional Football League and promoted to TNM Super League, was renamed Blantyre United.

In the 2012–13 season, the Blantyre-based side finished 3rd, their best ever performance, but in the next season struggled to avoid relegation finishing 12th and relegated at the end of the 2014 season.

After two seasons in the Second Division, Blantyre United returned to Super League of Malawi, winning the Southern Region Football League in 2016 season, but relegated again after ranking 15th at the end of the 2017 season.

In 2018 Blantyre United was disbanded for lack of funds.

== Stadium ==
The team was played at the 50,000 capacity Kamuzu Stadium.

== Honours ==
Southern Region Football League

- Winners (3): 2007, 2009–10, 2016
- Runners-up (1): 2008
