= ESCOM United FC =

ESCOM United
- Full name: ESCOM United Football Club
- Nicknames: The Electricians; Super Escom
- Founded: 1992
- Ground: Kamazu Stadium, Blantyre
- Capacity: 50,000
Home colours	Away colours

ESCOM United is a Malawian football club based in Blantyre. The club was relegated from the Malawi Premier Division in 2012–13.

== History ==
ESCOM United was founded in 1992 after a merger between two club from Lilongwe and Blantyre of the same company Electricity Supply Commission.

The Electricians, won their first league title in 2007 with one point difference in the last day of the season after MTL Wanderers, who was leading the table, lost home with Silver Strikers FC and Super Escom has won at Big Bullets FC.

== Honours ==
Super League of Malawi:

- Winners (2): 2007, 2010–11
- Runners-up (2): 2009–10, 2011–12

Malawi FAM Cup

- Runners-up (1): 2007

Malawi Carlsberg Cup

- Runners-up (2): 2001, 2012

Chibuku Cup

- Runners-up (1): 1999

Press Cup/Castle Cup

- Runners-up (1): 1998

President Cup

- Runners-up (1): 2008–09

== Performance in CAF competitions ==
- CAF Champions League:

2007 – withdrew in Preliminary Round
