= Balaka Township, Malawi =

Balaka District council
- Location in Malawi
- Coordinates: 14°55′S 34°52′E
- Country: Malawi
- Region: Southern Region
- District: Balaka District

Population (2018 Census)
  - Total: 36,308
- Time zone: +2
- Climate: Aw
- Website: https://www.balakadc.com/

Balaka is a township in Southern Region, Malawi and headquarters for the Balaka District. The township was formerly a boma of Machinga District, before the Balaka District was created in 1998.

A growing commercial centre on the road from Zomba to Lilongwe, as well as on a Blantyre–Salima rail route. The immediate trading centres that surround Balaka are Ntcheu, Phalula, Liwonde and Ulongwe. The town is situated roughly 130 kilometres north of Blantyre and about 200 kilometres south of Lilongwe.

The town's population is composed of people of multiple ethnicities. However, the Yaos and Ngoni's make up the biggest percentage.

The Andiamo, Montfort Media, and "Lucius Banda's" residential areas are characterised by well planned and modern houses which the locals equate to Lilongwe's formal houses of Area 10.

== Transport ==
In 2004, the passenger terminals were renovated, and now features recreational bars and several hawkers and restaurants that serve passengers on excursions. Telephone bureaus and cyber cafés are available for emergency communications.

Just opposite the entrance to the bus park, there is a yard where taxis park ready for transporting people to any desired destination. There are also lorries are hired for heavy goods.

There is a rail line that passes through the town. It helps people make use of cheap transport to Blantyre and other nearby places. Its route to Lilongwe via Salima was closed and is yet to be reopened.

== Commerce ==
Notable fast growing businesses are transportation, operating shops, timber selling, and most technical jobs. The market in Balaka is not very big and most of the things that are available on the market are food stuffs and clothes. It is a modern market of Malawi standard and can accommodate many vendors even though most of them prefer to sell their things outside the market. There are also a variety of shops which keep in stock different items. Some of these shops are hardware shops, groceries, finance and others that specialise in clothes.

== Religion ==
Balaka is a town and district that has people of mixed religious beliefs, mainly Christians and Muslims. Major Christian Churches in Balaka are Catholic, Church of Central Africa Presbyterian, Anglican, Seventh Day Adventist, Lutheran, and Nazarene.

=== The Catholic Church ===
It is called St Louis Montfort catholic parish. The church was officially opened on 30 October 1994 by the late bishop Alessandro Assolarri. Present on the day were the former Malawi president Bakili Muluzi and the former Tanzanian president late Julius Nyerere.

=== Church of Central African Presbyterian ===
Church of Central African Presbyterian (or CCAP) is another big denomination that has a big following in Balaka. It is situated behind the sports stadium in the heart of Balaka. As of January, 2012 there is a new church building which has replaced the old and small prayer house.

=== Anglican ===
Is situated next to Seventh Day and the Mosque. It attracts many followers as well but its prayer house is small and old. The site where Anglican church is found has many other churches as well including Seventh Day Adventist, Nazarene, and the Mosque.

== Education ==
Balaka has a number of education institutions ranging from primary to tertiary levels. Notable primary schools that offer quality education include Bakhita Primary, Praise Private, St. Augustine Primary, St. Louis Montfort Primary, and Kirk Range Private. Secondary schools that are recognised for quality education are Bakhita Girls, St Charles Lwanga Boys, Balaka Secondary School, Kirk Range Private, MEPIC Private and St. Louis Secondary school. All these are in proximity of not more than 3 km². Tertiary education is also available. However, formal schools that offer tertiary education are all branches of Andiamo Youth Cooperative Trust.

=== Technical college ===
This college enrolls students who wish to become motor vehicle mechanics, architects, carpenters with Joinery skills, electricians, and musicians.

=== Dental college ===
This college enrolls students who wish to become dentists. The college is within Comfort Clinics compound. It is managed by an Italian specialist who has currently 4 students.

=== Accounts and secretariat studies ===
There was a college at Bakhita Secondary school but it was closed some years back

== Civil Society (NGOs, CBOs, FBOs) ==
Balaka has a number of Non-Governmental Organizations (NGOs), Community-Based Organizations (CBOs) and Faith-Based Organizations (FBOs).

=== Sue Ryder Foundation ===
The Sue Ryder Foundation was founded in 1990. This local charity is based in Balaka Township and provides community-based nursing, rehabilitation and health education services to 6,500 people living in the rural areas of Balaka and Ntcheu. The work of the foundation is supported by village headmen and 600 local volunteers. www.suerydercare.org/Malawi

=== Self Help Africa ===
Self Help Africa is an international development agency that is currently implementing a rural development programme in the Kalembo area of Balaka District, Malawi. The project is working to enable more than 9,000 rural households to produce more food and earn a sustainable living. Self Help Africa has been supporting agricultural and economic development programmes in rural sub-Saharan Africa since 1984, and has been operating in Malawi since the mid-1990s.

=== Maphunziro Foundation ===
Maphunziro Foundation was registered in 1996 and serves the local population of Balaka with a variety of projects and initiatives to build capacity for community-based orphan care, HIV/AIDS and life skills education, income-generation (economic empowerment), and access to secondary education. The Maphunziro Foundation office is located in Mlambe Motel in Balaka Township. Maphunziro is a Chichewa word meaning "education".

=== Bola Moyo ===
Bola Moyo was formed in 2004 to address various challenges faced by the people of Balaka, including HIV/AIDS and other diseases, food insecurity, gender inequality, and poverty. The organisation focuses on empowering youth through various programs and initiatives including a youth centre (House of Many Stories), learning garden and secondary school sponsorships. Bola Moyo has offices in Portland, Oregon (USA) and Balaka Township, Malawi. Bola Moyo is a Chichewa phrase meaning "better life".

== Entertainment and leisure ==
Over the weekend, locals organise discotheques and teen times. However, live band performances attract more people that discos.

Balaka is a home to two big bands in Malawi: Alleluya Band which belongs to Andiamo Youth Cooperative, and Zembani Band which is owned by Lucius Banda.

== Press ==
Balaka is home to Montfort Media, one of the more prominent printing presses in Malawi. Popular magazines produced by this press are Together Magazine (a youth magazine) and The Lamp, a political journal. Since 2008, the media house started publishing MKWASO in Chichewa, Malawi's widely spoken vernacular. Back in 1992, the press was set ablaze by "ayufi" (MCP thugs) after it had published a pastoral letter written by Malawi bishops against one party rule.

Luntha Television has just been established a year ago and it telecasts religious events around Malawi. It is managed by a Montfort priest, padre Luciano Marangoni.

== Demographics ==
Year	Population
1987	9,064
1998	14,298
2008	22,733
2018	36,308
