= Football Association of Malawi =

Governing body of association football in Malawi

CAF
- Short name: FAM
- Founded: 1966
- FIFA affiliation: 1968
- CAF affiliation: 1973 (Provisional member); 1974
- President: Fleetwood Haiya
- Website: https://www.fam.mw

The Football Association of Malawi (FAM) is the governing body controlling the sport of football in the southern African country of Malawi. The Association is affiliated to the Confederation of African Football, FIFA and COSAFA.

== History ==
The Football Association of Malawi has been mostly associated with the senior national male team called the Flames. This team has been participating in international competitions since the 60s but has not had any honours as yet. It has qualified for the Africa Cup of Nations only once in the late 70s and the All Africa Cup in the 80s. The Flames were champions of CECAFA in 1978,1979 and 1988

The Flames changed their coach, Kinnah Phiri, who inspired them to qualify for the Africa Cup of Nations finals in Angola in 2010. Their only win at the AFCON Finals was a 3 - 0 against Algeria in their first game of the tournament. In 2010 they were ranked 82nd in the world and 27th in Africa. In 2010 the President Walter Nyamirandu told the BBC that the Organization will play at the 2022 FIFA World Cup.

== Notable male players ==
Ernest Mtawali played in South Africa, France, Mexico and Argentina (Newell's Old Boys in Of Essau Kanyenda is the only Malawian man to play in the European champion league and with Locomotiv Moscow in Russia. Dan Chitsulo played in Germany and Clement Kafwafwa in Denmark. There were also a number of notable players in South Africa, including Peter Mponda, John Maduka and Patrick Mabedi.

Players such as Joseph Kamwendo (Mozambique), Robert Ng’ambi and Limbikani Mzava (South Africa), Tawonga Chimodzi (Greece), Robin Ngalande (Spain), and Frank Gabadinho Mhango, who has played for Orlando Pirates, have been among those noted for their performances with the Flames.

== The staff of the Association (in 2022) ==
- President: Fleetwood Haiya
- Secretary General: Abdul Chiwalo
- Commercial and Marketing Director: Mayamiko Kafwamba
- Facility and TMS Manager : Casper Jangale
- Competitions Manager Gomezgani Zakazaka
- Administrative Assistant & Women's Desk Officer Charity Mabvumbe

A commentator in 2026 noted that the FAM Executive football committee in the country had ten members and eight of these were men who held all the senior positions.
