= Kamuzu Barracks FC =

Association football club in Malawi

Kamuzu Barracks
- Full name: Kamuzu Barracks Football Club
- Nickname: The Soldiers
- Short name: KB
- Ground: Civo Stadium, Lilongwe
- Capacity: 25,000
- Chairman: Maj Gift Njete
- Manager: Billy Phambala
- League: TNM Super League
- 2025: TNM Super League, 10th of 16
Home colours

Kamuzu Barracks Football Club are a Malawian football (soccer) club based in Lilongwe and currently playing in the TNM Super League, the top division of Malawian football.

== History ==
Kamuzu Barracks has won the Malawi Carlsberg Cup in 2013 after defeating Moyale Barracks FC in the final at the Mzuzu Stadium.

The Malawi Defence Force side was crowned champions of the country's elite league in 2016 season. The team defied all odds by became the champion against all odds. KB also dominated the 2016 season awards with the team talisman, Harvey Nkacha, named player of the season and Dave Banda named the best midfielder of the season. Apart from being awarded the championship it also produced the best technical panel.

== Stadium ==
Kamuzu Barracks plays its home matches at the 6,000 capacity Civo Stadium in Lilongwe.

== Honours ==
Super League of Malawi:

- Winners (1): 2016

Central Region Football League

- Winners (1): 2011–12

Malawi FAM Charity Shield:

- Runners-up (1): 2017

Malawi FAM Cup

- Winners (1): 2017
- Runners-up (1): 2016

Malawi Carlsberg Cup

- Winners (1): 2013
