= Blue Eagles FC =

Association football club in Malawi

- Full name: Blue Eagles Football Club
- Nickname: The Cops
- Founded: 1988
- Ground: Nankhaka Stadium; Lilongwe
- Capacity: 5,000
- Chairman: Tyrone Mudenda
- Manager: Kevin Banda
- League: TNM Super League
- 2025: TNM Super League, 4th of 16

Blue Eagles Football Club is a Malawian football (soccer) club based in Lilongwe, Malawi. It currently plays in the TNM Super League, the top division of Malawian football.

== History ==
Blue Eagles FC was founded in 1988 and is sponsored by the Malawi Police Service as tool to bring interaction between the community they serve and them.

The Cops clinched their first trophy, Chibuku Cup, in 1995, defeated Bata Bullets with 2–0 at the Civo Stadium.

Blue Eagles finished 8th in the top flight in the 2011–12 season and won the 2011 Standard Bank Cup after 2–1 victory over Moyale Barracks at the Silver Stadium in Lilongwe.

The 2019 season saw "The Cops" finished 3rd in the Super League, won the FISD Challenge Cup and qualified for the 2020–21 CAF Confederation Cup, but declined to participate in the competition.

On 21 December 2020, Blue Eagles has announced the appointment of Gerald Phiri as Head Coach, replaced Deklerk Msakakuona who took over as the coach for the Under 17 Malawi National Football Team.

In November 2021, following a poor season in which they survived relegation in the final match, Blue Eagles replaced Gerald Phiri with Christopher Sibale.

Despite being relegated from the elite league in 2023 TNM Super League season, the team is striving to get back.

The Team has new structure. The head coach is Eliah Kananji, Ass. Coach is Sankhani Mkandawire. Team Manager is Frank Kalozeni being assisted by Philip Masiye. Kaitano Lubrino is the media officer and is being assisted by Edwin Mbewe.

Blue Eagles Football club has a reserve side being coached by Christopher Sibale. Mohammed Matola Alli is now the Chief Administration Officer for all the teams.

== Stadium ==
Currently the team plays at the 5000 capacity Nankhaka Stadium which is situated in Area 30 at National Police Headquarters in Lilongwe.

== Honours ==
Super League of Malawi:

- Runners-up (1): 2022

Malawi FAM Cup

- Winners (3): 2011, 2019, 2024

Airtel Top 8 Cup

- Winners (1): 2018

Bingu Ikhome Cup

- Winners (1): 2019

Malawi Carlsberg Cup

- Winners (1): 2012

Tutulane Charity Cup

- Runners-up (1): 2007

Chibuku Cup

- Winners (1): 1995

FDH Bank Cup

- Winners (1): 2024

== Players ==
=== Current squad ===
As of 28 February 2020

Note: Flags indicate national team as defined under FIFA eligibility rules; some limited exceptions apply. Players may hold more than one non-FIFA nationality.

No.	Pos.	Nation	Player
–	GK	MAW	John Soko
–	GK	MAW	Chimwemwe Kumkwawa
–	GK	MAW	Thoko Zimba
–	DF	MAW	Stivie Chagoma
–	DF	MAW	Alexander Chigawa
–	DF	MAW	Mike Nyondo
–	DF	MAW	Onesimo Mbendera
–	DF	MAW	Wonder Jeremani
–	DF	MAW	Osward Maonga
–	DF	MAW	Jacob Robert
–	DF	MAW	Ganizani James
–	MF	MAW	Lazarus Nyamela
–	MF	MAW	Kelvin Tshibwabwa
–	MF	MAW	Gilbert Chirwa

No.	Pos.	Nation	Player
–	MF	MAW	Vitumbiko Kumwenda
–	MF	MAW	Henry Misinjo
–	MF	MAW	Brian Msumatiza
–	MF	MAW	Mecium Mhone
–	MF	MAW	Paul Master
–	MF	MAW	Stuart Mbunge
–	FW	MAW	John Malidadi Jr
–	FW	MAW	Mphatso Filimoni
–	FW	MAW	Chifuniro Mpinganjira
–	FW	MAW	Gaddie Chirwa
–	FW	MAW	Maxwell Salambula
–	FW	MAW	Denis Nandolo
–	FW	MAW	Kingsley Kuwali
