= Civo Stadium =

Stadium in Lilongwe, Malawi

CIVO Stadium
- Interactive map of CIVO Stadium
- Location: Lilongwe, Malawi
- Coordinates: 13°58′41.55″S 33°45′31.11″E
- Capacity: 25,000

Tenant
- CIVO United

The CIVO Stadium, formerly Stade des Jeunes, is a stadium located in Lilongwe, Malawi. It has a seating capacity of 25,000 spectators. It serves as the home of CIVO United of the Malawi Premier Division. In 2010 it was in a re-construction by the Chinese government.

Malawi's had a return leg 2013 Africa Cup of Nations qualifier against Ghana. It was moved to Lilongwe's Civo Stadium after the Kamazu stadium was closed.
