= Kamuzu Stadium =

Building in Malawi

Coordinates: 15°47′56″S 35°2′4.2″E

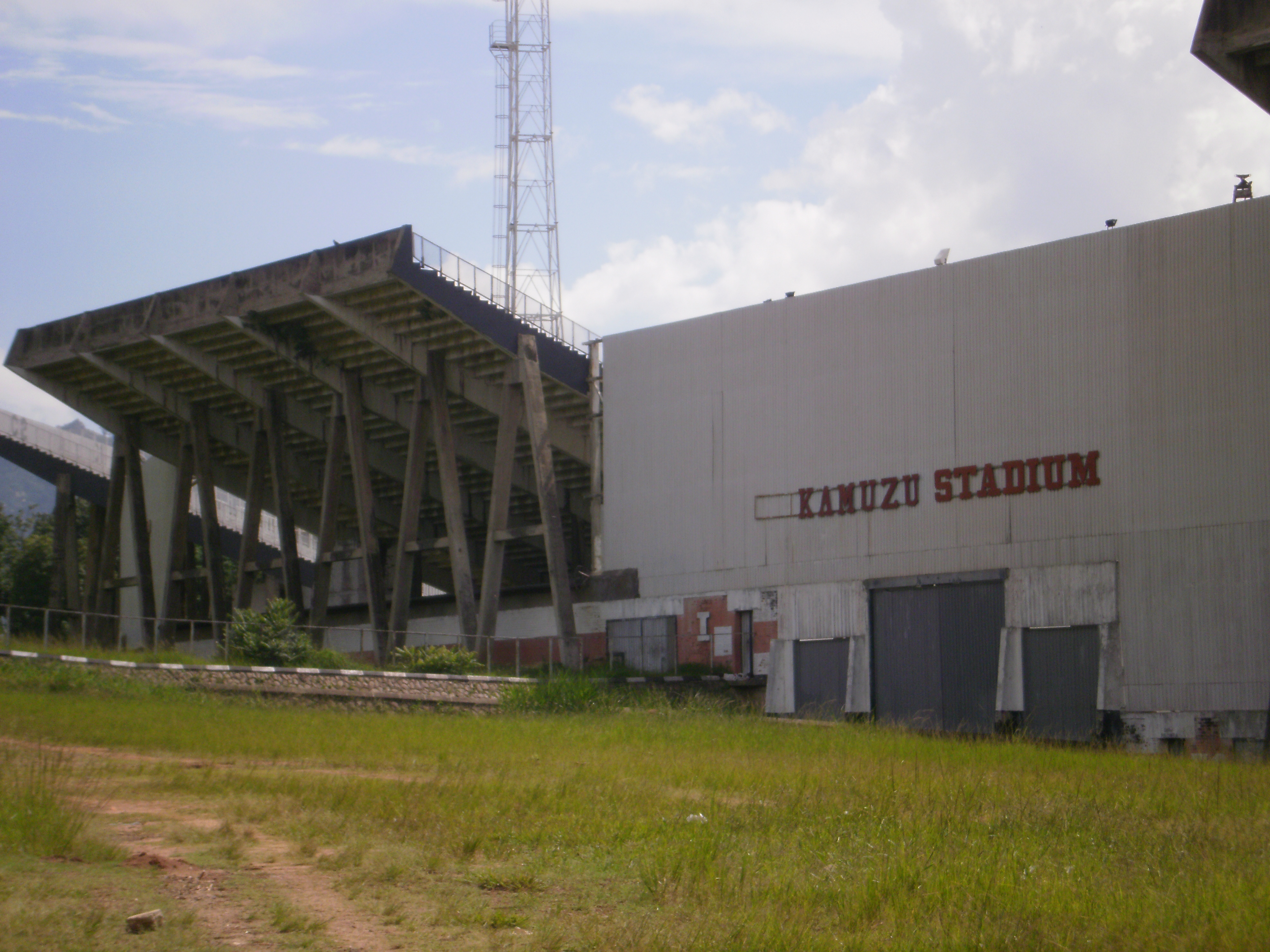
- Exterior of the stadium
- Interactive map of Kamuzu Stadium
- Location: Blantyre, Malawi
- Capacity: 65,000
- Surface: Act Global Artificial Turf, FIFA Certified

Construction
- Opened: 1964
- Renovated: 1968, 2004

Tenants
- Nyasa Big Bullets FC; Mighty Wanderers FC; Malawi national football team (until 2017)

The Kamuzu Stadium is a multi-purpose stadium in Blantyre, Malawi. It is currently used mostly for football matches. The stadium holds 65,000 people. This can be limited for safety reasons. Big Bullets and Be Forward Wanderers are tenants.

== History ==
The stadium was originally named Rangeley Stadium during the colonial era to commemorate British civil servant William H. J. Rangeley. It later became known as Kamuzu Stadium, after Malawi's first President, Hastings Kamuzu Banda, when Malawi gained independence from Britain. The main stands were designed and drawn by L Jeffery and Steve Price, the works completed in 1968. After Kamuzu's presidency, the name was changed to Chichiri Stadium under President Bakili Muluzi; however, under Muluzi's successor, Bingu wa Mutharika, the name Kamuzu Stadium was restored in 2004.

FIFA through its GOAL programme has sponsored the renovation of the natural grass pitch into a synthetic football pitch. This artificial turf field, called Xtreme Turf, has been manufactured and installed by Act Global.

President Peter Mutharika's inauguration ceremony was held at Kamuzu Stadium on 2 June 2014.

== See also ==
- Mzuzu Stadium
- List of Malawian stadiums
