= Malawi Armed Forces College FC =

MAFCO
- Full name: Malawi Armed Forces College Football Club
- Nickname: The Soldiers
- Ground: Chitowe Stadium; Nkhotakota
- Capacity: 1,000
- Chairman: Captain H Subili
- Manager: WOII Thomas Kayamba
- League: TNM Super League
- 2025: TNM Super League, 13th of 16

Malawi Armed Forces College FC (MAFCO) is a Malawian football (soccer) club based in Salima, Central Region and currently playing in the TNM Super League, the top division of Malawian football.

== History ==
MAFCO, return to top league in 2010 winning the Central Region Football League after four years in the second division.

After three seasons finished at the bottom of the league table, struggling with relegation, the soldiers, under the management of head coach Stereo Gondwe, clinched 3rd position in 2013 season and won the President Cup after beating Silver Strikers FC on the final.

In the following year, the team finished in 7th position and reached the quarter-finals of the Malawi Carlsberg Cup and semi-finals in the Standard Bank Knockout Cup.

In the 2015 season MAFCO finished as Super League runners-up, their highest league placing and reached again the quarter-final of the Malawi Carlsberg Cup.

In 2018, The Salima-based soldiers, ended the nine-year stay in the TNM Super League after finished in 15th position.

== Stadium ==
Currently the team plays at the 1,000 capacity Chitowe Stadium in Nkhotakota.

== Honours ==
Super League of Malawi:

- Runners-up (1): 2015

Central Region Football League

- Winners (1): 2009–10

President Cup

- Winners (1): 2013–14

Central Region Football League

- Winners (1): 2019
