= Mighty Tigers FC =

Association football club in Malawi

Mighty Tigers
- Full name: Mighty Tigers Football Club
- Nickname: Kau Kau Boys
- Founded: 1980; 46 years ago
- Ground: Kamuzu Stadium; Blantyre
- Capacity: 65,000
- Chairman: (Malawi) Clarence Mphepo
- Manager: Leo Mpulula
- League: TNM Super League
- 2024: TNM Super League, 12th of 16

Mighty Tigers Football Club is a Malawian football (soccer) club based in Blantyre that currently plays in the TNM Super League, the top division of Malawian football.

== History ==
It was founded in 1980 in the city of Blantyre with the name Admarc Tigers. Tigers has been producing quality players to the local teams including Mighty Mukuru Wanderers, Nyasa Big Bullets, Silver Strikers just to mention but a few. Among other notable players are Stanly Sanudi, William Nthole, Isaac Kaliat, Yamikani Chester, Innocent Nyasulu.

== Stadium ==
Currently the team plays at the 6,000 capacity mpira Stadium.

== Honours ==
Super League of Malawi

- Winners (1): 1989
- Runners-up (1): 1986

Malawi FAM Cup

- Winners (1): 2009
- Runners-up (2): 2005, 2014

Chibuku Cup

- Winners (1): 1985

Kamuzu Cup

- Winners (2): 1988, 1990

Press Cup/Castle Cup

- Runners-up (1): 1994

Challenge 555 Cup

- Winners (1): 1984

BAT Sportsman Trophy

- Winners (1): 1984
