= Red Lions FC (Malawi) =

- Full name: Red Lions Football Club
- Nickname: Ma Reds
- Founded: 1976
- Ground: Balaka Stadium; Balaka, Malawi
- Capacity: 3,000
- Chairman: Lt col Yetala
- Manager: Mike Kumanga
- League: TNM Super League
- 2023: TNM Super League, 15th of 16

Red Lions Football Club is a Malawian football (soccer) club based in Zomba, Southern Region and currently playing in the TNM Super League, the top division of Malawian football.

== History ==
The Red Lions FC is a military football club from Zomba, the old capital of Malawi. In the past the club was predominantly made of soldiers. Most of their players were spotted from smaller military teams back in the days in the name of Moyale Barracks FC, Kamuzu Barracks FC and the Kamuzu Military College now MAFCO. In recent years all these teams have been promoted to play in the TNM Super League, the highest football league in the country, thus the Red Lions Football Club have to acquire talent from elsewhere.

The club has produced notable footballers some of which were instrumental in the success of the Malawi national football team such as Collins Thewe, Matthias Chisale, Wilfred Nyalugwe, Mike Kumanga, Prichard Mwansa and Victor Phiri among others. The club has never been relegated since the inception of the Super League in Malawi. Even though its currently base is in the Eastern Town of Balaka, the club hails from Zomba City.

== Current squad ==
As of 11 January 2021

Note: Flags indicate national team as defined under FIFA eligibility rules; some limited exceptions apply. Players may hold more than one non-FIFA nationality.

No.	Pos.	Nation	Player
–	GK	MWI	Jacob Kaunda
–	DF	MWI	Stivie Chagoma
–	DF	MWI	Patrick Sanudi
–	DF	MWI	James Chirwa
–	DF	MWI	Gibson Nkhonjera
–	DF	MWI	Mphatso Ngwira
–	DF	MWI	Clemment Mlomba
–	DF	MWI	Benesi Kaisi
–	DF	MWI	Chikondi Sanudi
–	MF	MWI	Chikoti Chirwa

No.	Pos.	Nation	Player
–	MF	MWI	Lotti Chawinga
–	MF	MWI	Ndaona Limbani
–	MF	MWI	Steve Ziba
–	MF	MWI	Moses Nankumba
–	FW	MWI	Kumbukani Mwambene
–	FW	MWI	Innocent Bokosi
–	FW	MWI	Bonface Kaulesi
–	FW	MWI	Mathews Simbeyi
–	FW	MWI	Willard John
