= Moyale Barracks FC =

Association football club in Malawi

Moyale Barracks
- Full name: Moyale Barracks Football Club
- Nickname: The Lions of Kaning'ina
- Founded: 1967
- Ground: Mzuzu Stadium
- Capacity: 15,000
- Chairman: (Malawi) Richard Katsonga
- Manager: (Malawi) Nickolas Mhango
- League: TNM Super League
- 2025: TNM Super League, 9th of 16

Moyale Barracks Football Club is a Malawian professional football club based in Moyale, Mzuzu, currently playing in the TNM Super League, the top division of Malawian football.

The club is a military outfit named after Moyale Barracks of the MDF. Moyale is a place and barracks in Kenya where Malawi Soldiers used as a transit camp during World War II. The Nickname "Lions of Kaning'ina" represent the following: Lions is nickname for soldiers in the country in general while KANING'INA is the name of the forest where Moyale Barracks was established immediate east of Mzuzu City South of Lunyangwa Valley along M5 Mzuzu - Nkhatabay road approximately 3 km from CBD. The word Kaning'ina is a short form of originally Kaning'iniya Vuwa, one of the local languages that means a place with fog and heavy rains throughout the year with patches of little sun, a true summary of its actual weather presently. The club has a strong management structure that includes Board of Trustees (very Senior citizens), an executive committee (elected on 2-year tenure), a Technical panel and Supporters Committee (elected from across the northern region).

== Ground ==
Moyale Barracks plays its home matches on Mzuzu Stadium, located in Mzuzu, Northern Region, with a capacity of 15,000 people.

== Honours ==
Super League of Malawi:

- Runners-up (2): 2013, 2014

Malawi FAM Cup

- Winners (2): 2008, 2010
- Runners-up (2): 2011, 2017

Malawi Carlsberg Cup

- Winners (1): 2001
- Runners-up (1): 2013

BP Top 8 Cup

- Runners-up (1): 2003

Chibuku Cup

- Winners (1): 1999
