= Civil Service United FC =

Malawian football club

- Full name: Civil Service United Football Club-Civo
- Nickname: The Servants
- Ground: Civo Stadium; Lilongwe
- Capacity: 25,000
- Chairman: Victor Lungu
- Manager: Franco Ndawa
- League: TNM Super League
- 2024: TNM Super League, 5th of 16

Civil Service United Football Club-Civo (CIVO United), which represents Civil Services, is a Malawian football (soccer) club based in Lilongwe area 9.

The men's team plays in the TNM Super League, the top division of Malawi football. The team is led by an executive committee which is chaired by Victor Lungu and the General Secretary is Edgar Chipalanjira. The technical panel is led by Wilson Chidati who is deputized by coach Charles Ben.

In 1987 the team won the TNM Super League.

== Stadium ==
Currently the team plays at the Civo Stadium.

== Honours ==
Super League of Malawi

- Winners (1): 1987
