= Mighty Wanderers FC =

Association football club in Malawi

Mighty Wanderers
- Full name: Mighty Wanderers Football Club
- Nickname: The Nomads
- Founded: 1962
- Ground: Kamuzu Stadium; Blantyre
- Capacity: 65,000
- Chairman: Thom Mpinganjira
- Manager: Bob Gerald Mpinganjira
- League: TNM Super League
- 2025: TNM Super League, Champions of 16
Home colours	Away colours

Mighty Wanderers Football Club is a Malawian football club based in Blantyre. The men's team currently play in the TNM Super League, the top division of Malawian men's football. The women's team, Mighty Wanderers Queens, compete in the top tier of Malawian women's football, the National Bank of Malawi Women’s Football League.

== History ==
Mighty Mukuru Wanderers FC is one of the most successful men's football teams in Malawi, having won the Super League of Malawi 7 times. Founded in 1962 by Portuguese immigrants in Blantyre, it is the oldest active club in Malawi. The founders of the club were FC Porto supporters in their homeland; as such, they incorporated the blue and white colours of Porto into the club's crest. The club's first official base was Chichiri in Blantyre. It is commonly rumoured that the current club house was built after a white Portuguese girl fell in love with club legend Yasin Osman, much to the displeasure of the Portuguese. As such, the club house was built specifically for African players after this incident to deter future love relationships between Africans and Europeans.

In 2005 and 2006 their leading striker, Aggrey Kanyenda was the top goal scorer in the 2005–06 season. Their midfielder, Isaac Kaliati won the 2024 Super League of Malawi golden boot after scoring an impressive 17 goals to add to his 9 league assists in 27 appearances.

Due to sponsorship reasons, the team was previously known as Limbe Leaf Wanderers, Telecom Wanderers, MTL Wanderers, Be Forward Wanderers and Mighty Mukuru Wanderers.

In 2014, the club won sponsorship of about 70 million kwacha from Be Forward, a Japanese car exporter.

In 2017, coached by Yasin Osman, Wanderers won their first league title in 11 years.

In 2020 Adelaide Migogo joined the "Nomads" Executive Committee. She became the vice-General Secretary. She was unopposed in the election and she was the only women on the committee.

In January 2021, Wanderers changed its name after the Japanese second-hand car dealers, Be Forward, concluded its sponsorship contract.

== Mighty Wanderers Queens ==
In 2023 Mighty Wanderers FC wanted to return to competing in Confederation of African Football (CAF) Interclubs tournaments. A CAF requirement was that participating clubs operate a women's team, and so Wanderers looked for women's teams to buy or partner with. Four women's teams expressed interest: DD Sunshine, Evirom, Ntopwa and Bangwe Super Queens. Wanderers chose Bangwe Super Queens, and by March 2023 the acquisition had been concluded for an undisclosed sum. From this point on, Bangwe Super Queens were renamed Mighty Wanderers Queens, and were the women's team associated with the Mighty Wanderers. Mighty Wanderers Queens compete in the top tier of Malawian women's football, the National Bank of Malawi Women’s Football League.

== Rivalries ==
The Blantyre derby between Big Bullets and Mighty Wanderers is a fiercely contested match and in contrast to most of the other games played in the domestic cups and the Malawi TNM Super League, matches between the two rivals always attract a large fan base. It is generally considered the biggest game on the local football calendar attracting wide coverage from the fans and the media.

The rivalry intensified in the 2020s, particularly after the 2025 Football League season when Mighty Wanderers FC had a string of four successive wins, without conceding a single goal, over their bitter rivals beating them to the 2025 TNM Super League title and the 2026 Charity Shield.

The club also shares notable rivalries with Blue Eagles, Civil Service United and Silver Strikers FC. Matches between these games are also a notable fixture on the Football Calendar.

== Honours ==
- Super League of Malawi: 7

1990, 1995, 1997, 1998, 2006, 2017, 2025

- Castel Challenge Cup:1

2024

- Bp Top 8: 1

2004

- Malawi Carlsberg Cup:1

1999

- Malawi FAM Cup: 3

2005,2012, 2013

- Malawi Charity Shield: 3

2004, 2006, 2026

- Bingu Cup: 1

2008

- Chibuku Cup: 8

1969, 1972, 1973, 1976, 1978, 1994, 1997

- Kamuzu Cup: 4'

1976, 1982, 1985, 1997

- Airtel Top 8 Malawi: 1'

2022

- Press Cup: 1

1990

- '555 Challenge Cup: 3

1985, 1986, 1997

- Franklin Cup: 1

1966/67

- Stan Hope Trophy: 1

1964/65

- BAT Sportsman Trophy: 2

1985, 1986

- Presidential Cup: 2

2008/09, 2011

== Players ==
=== Current squad ===
As of 3 April, 2025

Note: Flags indicate national team as defined under FIFA eligibility rules; some limited exceptions apply. Players may hold more than one non-FIFA nationality.

No.	Pos.	Nation	Player
-	GK	MAW	Richard Chipuwa
—	GK	MAW	Vincent Mdoka
—	GK	MAW	Chancy Mtete
—	GK	MAW	Dalitso Khungwa
—	DF	MAW	Lawrence Chaziya
—	DF	MAW	Stanley Sanudi
—	DF	MAW	Masiya Manda
—	MF	MAW	Wisdom Mpinganjira
—	DF	MAW	Timothy Silwimba
—	DF	MAW	Emmanuel Nyirenda
—	DF	MAW	Peter Cholopi

No.	Pos.	Nation	Player
—	DF	MAW	Ahmed Kung'umbe
—	DF	MAW	Chimwemwe Nkhoma
—	DF	MAW	Samson Banda
—	DF	MAW	Lexon Osman
—	MF	MAW	Nanison Mbewe
—	MF	MAW	Blessings Singini
—	MF	MAW	Felix Zulu
—	MF	MAW	Daniel Kudonto Jr.
—	MF	MAW	Davie Chikaonda
—	MF	MAW	Vitumbiko Kumwenda
—	MF	MAW	Isaac Kaliati
