= Nyasa Big Bullets FC =

Association football club in Malawi

FCB Nyasa Big Bullets
- Full name: Nyasa Big Bullets Football Club
- Nicknames: The People's Team; Maule; Mapale
- Short name: NBB
- Founded: 1966; 60 years ago
- Ground: Mpira Stadium
- Capacity: 15000
- Coach: Wedson Nyirenda
- League: Super League of Malawi
- 2025: TNM Super League, 2nd of 16
- Website: nyasabigbullets.com
Home colours	Away colours

FCB Nyasa Big Bullets is a Malawian professional association football club based in Blantyre, currently playing in the FDH Premiership, the top division of Malawian football. The club was formerly known as Bata Bullets, Total Big Bullets and Bakili Bullets. Nyasa Big Bullets are regarded as the most successful club in Malawian football history, having won the Super League of Malawi a record 17 times.

== History ==
The club was formed in 1967 by a group of players who split from Mighty Wanderers. The original name was Nyasaland Bullets, but the club managed to source good sponsorship from Bata Shoe Company and was renamed as Bata Bullets.

1970 season was a great success as Bullets achieved a treble after winning the Blantyre and Districts Football League (BDFL), the Chibuku Cup and Castle Cup.

In 2003, then Malawi President Bakili Muluzi adopted the team and renamed it Bakili Bullets. It was during this period that the team enjoyed one of its glamorous periods, reaching the lucrative group stages of CAF Champions League 2004.

It was also during the same period that the club had a training camp in the United Kingdom in readiness for the CAF Champions League. Currently the team is sponsored by Nyasa Manufacturing Company (NMC). Its nickname ever since is Maulle (native language for bullets).

On 8 October 2018, Rodgers Yasin was sacked as Nyasa Big Bullets head coach along with assistant Elijah Kananji.

Bullets were coached by Peter Mponda. The 2023 football season was one of the most successful for Bullets, they won all four domestic trophies on offer; The TNM SUPER LEAGUE, The Airtel Top 8, The FDH Bank Cup, and The Castel Challenge Cup.

== Stadium ==
Kamuzu Stadium is a stadium located in Blantyre, with a capacity of 50,000 seats. It is located next to the Malawi National Council of Sports Offices.

== The Blantyre derby ==
The Blantyre derby between Big Bullets and Mighty Wanderers is a fiercely contested match and in contrast to most of the other games played in the Malawi TNM Super League, matches between the two rivals always attract a large fanbase.

== Honours ==
=== Domestic ===
- Super League of Malawi:
  - Winners (17): 1986, 1991, 1992, 1999, 2000, 2001, 2002, 2003, 2004, 2005, 2014, 2015, 2018, 2019, 2020–21, 2022, 2023
  - Runners-up (4): 2008, 2012–13, 2016, 2017
- Castle Cup (Malawi)
  - Winners (4): 1969, 1970, 1973, 1975
- Kamuzu Cup
  - Winners (7): 1974, 1975, 1979, 1980, 1981, 1983, 1986
- 555 Challenge Cup:
  - Winners (1): 1990
- Embassy Trophy:
  - Winners (1): 2003
- Chombe Tea:
  - Winners (2): 1998, 1999
- Carlsberg Cup:
  - Winners (3): 2002, 2014, 2017
- Tutulane Charity Cup:
  - Winners (1): 2007

Airtel Top 8 Malawi Winners (3) 2021, 2023, 2024.

- Carlsberg Charity Cup:
  - Winners (1): 2012
- Presidential Cup:
  - Winners (2): 2012, 2016
- Chifundo Charity Shield:
  - Winners (3): 2016, 2017, 2018, 2019, 2022

=== Continental ===
- Kagame Interclub Cup
  - Runners-up (1): 2021

== Performance in CAF competitions ==
- CAF Champions League: 7 appearances

2000 – Preliminary round
2004 – Group stage
2015 – First Round
2018–19 – Preliminary round
2019–20 – Preliminary round
2020–21 – Withdrew
2021–22 – First Round

- African Cup of Champions Clubs: 3 appearances

1975: Second Round
1979: Withdrew in First Round
1993: Withdrew in preliminary round

- CAF Cup Winners' Cup: 5 appearances

1976 – First Round
1977 – Second Round
1997 – First Round
1998 – Preliminary round
1999 – First Round

== Current men's squad ==
As of January 2025 Note: Flags indicate national team as defined under FIFA eligibility rules; some limited exceptions apply. Players may hold more than one non-FIFA nationality.

No.	Pos.	Nation	Player
1	GK	MAW	Innocent Nyasulu
2	DF	MAW	Erick Kaonga
3	MF	MAW	Lloyd Banega Aaron
4	DF	MAW	Nickson Nyasulu
5	MF	MAW	Blessing Mpokera
6	DF	MAW	John Lanjesi
7	MF	MAW	Frank Willard
8	DF	MAW	Precious Sambani
9	MF	MAW	Mike Mkwate
10	FW	MAW	Hassan Kajoke
11	MF	MAW	Ernest Petro
12	MF	MAW	Righteous Banda
13	MF	MAW	Alick Lungu
14	DF	MAW	Yamikani Fodya
15	DF	KEN	Clyde Seneji
16	DF	MAW	Gomezgan Chirwa

No.	Pos.	Nation	Player
17	GK	MAW	Clever Mkungula {{Fs player|no=19|nat=Malawi|name=Mphatso Magombo|pos=FW}}
20	FW	MAW	Lanjesi Nkhoma
21	MF	MAW	Precious Phiri
22	FW	MAW	Anthony Mfune
23	MF	MAW	Stanley Billiat
24	GK	MAW	Richard Chimbamba
25	MF	MAW	McFallen Mgwira
26	DF	MAW	Kesten Simbi
27	DF	KEN	Collins Okumu
28	DF	MAW	Yankho Singo
29	MF	MAW	Patrick Mwaungulu
30	FW	MAW	Maxwell Gastin Phodo
31	MF	MAW	Chawanangwa Gumbo
32	MF	ZIM	Kenneth Pasuwa
33	FW	MAW	Ephraim Kondowe

== Club officials/technical team ==
- Chief Executive Officer: (Malawi) Suzgo Nyirenda
- Board President: (Malawi) Konrad Buckle
- Board Members: (Malawi) 1. Stone Mwamadi, 2. Fleetwood Haiya, 3. Malinda Chinyama, 4.Sadick Malinga, 5. Dimitri Kalaitzis, 6.Democrotos Kalaitzis, 7 Rev. Moyenda Kanjerwa, 8. Chifundo Makande, 9.Albert Chigoga, 10. Noel Lipipa, 11. Konrad Buckle, 12. Escort Chinula
- Head Coach: (Malawi) Gilbert Chirwa
- Assistant coach: (Malawi) Peter Mponda (1st), (Malawi) Heston Munthali (2nd)
- Team Manager: (Malawi) James Chilapondwa
- Goalkeeper Trainer: (Malawi) Swadick Sanudi
- Team Doctor: (Malawi) Felix Mwalule
- Kitmaster: (Malawi) Malumbo Chikoko
- Media Manager: (Malawi) Kimpho Loka
