= Energy in Malawi =

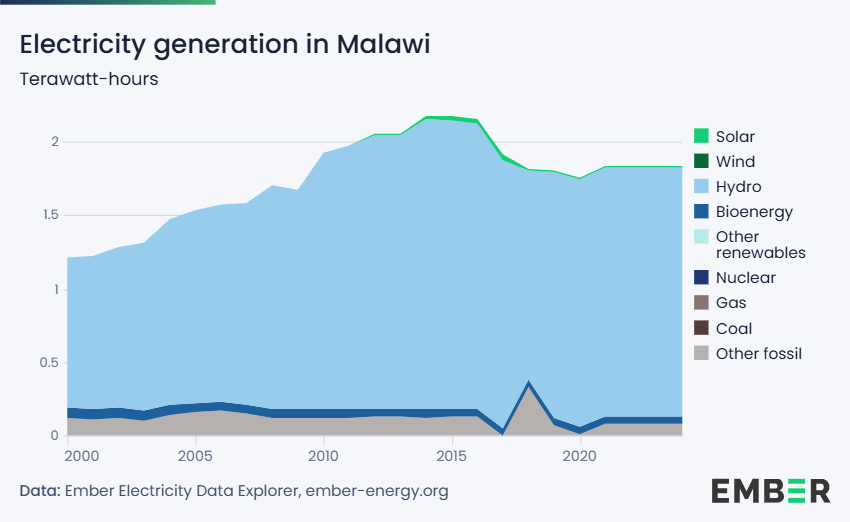
Electricity generation in Malawi in terawatt-hours

Burning of charcoal and wood fuel provides approximately 94 percent of the energy in Malawi. Much of the renewable hydroelectric potential of the country is untapped. As per 2018 Population and Housing Census, the national electrification rate in Malawi was 10 percent, with 37 percent of the urban population and only 2 percent of the rural population having access to electricity.

== Background ==
In January 2025, Malawi's installed electricity-generating capacity was 554.24 megawatts (743,250 hp), of which 101 MW (18.2 percent) was solar.

With a population of 20.3 million people in 2021, the country's per capita consumption of electrical energy is still low, estimated at 93 kWh per year compared with an average of 432 kWh for Sub-Saharan Africa and 2167 kWh per year for the World average. There is urgency for Malawi to reach the critical threshold of 500 kWh per year.

Around 85% of energy comes from biomass largely exploited in an unsustainable manner. Imported petroleum account for 3.5% of the energy and electricity produced from hydro power accounts for 2.3% of all energy. Nevertheless, Malawi has the potential to reach 100% sustainable energy access by 2030. According to one study, the country needs to increase generation capacity to 1,200 megawatts while adding 1.2 million new grid connections to achieve this goal. Improving energy access will have direct impacts on economic development and poverty reduction, climate change, health, and water.

The un-bundling of the former electricity monopoly Electric Supply Commission of Malawi (ESCOM), with the formation of the Electricity Generation Company Malawi Limited (Egenco), is a welcome development. With the government of Malawi continuing to reform the energy sector, strong investor interest has developed with Independent Power Producers (IPPs) willing to enter the Malawi energy market.

== History ==
In 2001, as a result of droughts and famines, an unconventional electricity-producing wind turbine made out of spare parts and scrap was built in the village of Wimbe near Kasungu by 14-year-old inventor William Kamkwamba.

== Hydroelectricity ==
The majority of the country's hydroelectric power stations are situated in the Southern Region of the country, specifically on the Shire River. Total grid-connected hydropower is 351 megawatts. This is expected to increase to 369 megawatts, when the 18 megawatts Tedzani IV Hydroelectric Power Station is completed in 2020.

With peak demand of 350 megawatts and growing at about 6 percent annually, the Malawian grid has very little flexibility. This has exposed the country to severe, recurrent load-shedding. It has also stunted big industrial and manufacturing projects, especially in the areas of mining and processing, slowing national development and curtailing job creation.

The hydro-potential of the Shire River is estimated at 600 MW, and another 400 megawatts of potential exists on smaller rivers including Songwe River, South Rukuru River, Dwangwa River and Bua River. Smaller off-grid untapped potential exists on smaller rivers scattered around the county.

== Thermal power ==
Malawi has coal reserves estimated at 22 billion tons. Coal can also be imported from neighboring Mozambique, via railroad. In 2014, Malawi decided to go ahead with plans to build Kammwamba Thermal Power Station, a planned 1,000 megawatts (1,300,000 hp), coal-fired power station in Neno District. The plans call for starting with a 300 megawatts development, expandable in the future to 1,000 megawatts. The primary source of the coal to fire the power station, was identified as the Moatize coalfields in neighboring Mozambique. The imported coal would be hauled to the site via the nearby railway line.

The government, through the Electricity Supply Commission of Malawi, has established, on a temporary basis, several diesel fuel power stations in various locations around the country.

== Oil and natural gas ==
As of April 2018, Malawi has no proven oil and/or gas reserves.

== Solar energy ==
Several IPPs are in the process of setting up grid-ready photo-voltaic solar power plants, to be ready by December 2019. The sites under consideration include Salima, Lilongwe, Dedza and Nkhotakota. A total of 40-70 megawatts is expected from these sites. Many off-grid solar projects dot the countryside, as the hope of universal grid coverage is increasingly growing doubtful.

== See also ==
- List of power stations in Malawi
- Electricity Supply Commission of Malawi
