= Kholombidzo Hydroelectric Power Station =

Hydroelectric power plant in Malawi

- Location in Malawi
- Country: Malawi
- Location: Kholombidzo, Blantyre District, Southern Region
- Coordinates: 15°23′41″S 34°53′39″E
- Purpose: Power
- Status: Proposed
- Construction began: 2018 (expected)
- Construction cost: $435 million
- Owner: Electricity Generation Company Malawi Limited

Dam and spillways
- Type of dam: Run-of-river
- Impounds: Shire River

Kholombidzo Power Station
- Commission date: 2021 (expected)
- Turbines: 4×50 MW
- Installed capacity: 200 megawatts (270,000 hp)

Kholombidzo Dam, also Kholombidzo Hydroelectric Power Station, is a planned 200 megawatts (270,000 hp) hydroelectric dam in Malawi.

== Location ==
The power station would be located across the Shire River, in the village of Kholombidzo, Blantyre District, in the Southern Region of Malawi. Kholombidzo is the location of Kholombidzo Falls (formerly Murchison Falls), adjacent to the village of Chipironje. This is about 52 kilometres (32 mi), by road, north-west of Blantyre, the financial capital of Malawi.

== Overview and history ==
In 2013, the government of Malawi advertised for bids to carry out feasibility studies for a power station with capacity of 160–370 megawatts, using US$2 million granted to Malawi by the African Development Bank (AfDB).

The contract for the feasibility study and project design was awarded to COBA, a Portuguese engineering firm. It is anticipated that the plant will be built under the public-private-partnership (PPP) model, with the Electricity Generation Company Malawi Limited (Egenco), representing the government.

The power generated is expected to be evacuated via the nearby 400kV substation at Phombeya, approximately 16.5 kilometres (10.3 mi), by road, to the north of Kholombidzo Falls.

== Construction, cost and funding ==
The feasibility study put the cost of construction at US$435 million. The scope of work involves construction of a dam, a powerhouse, a substation, and service roads. It also includes the installation of four turbines, transformers, generators, and the laying of transmission lines. Construction was expected to start in 2018 and conclude in 2021. In 2020, the beginning of construction was pushed back to 2021, with completion planned for 2024.

== See also ==
- List of power stations in Malawi
- Electricity Supply Commission of Malawi
