= Nchalo =

- Town
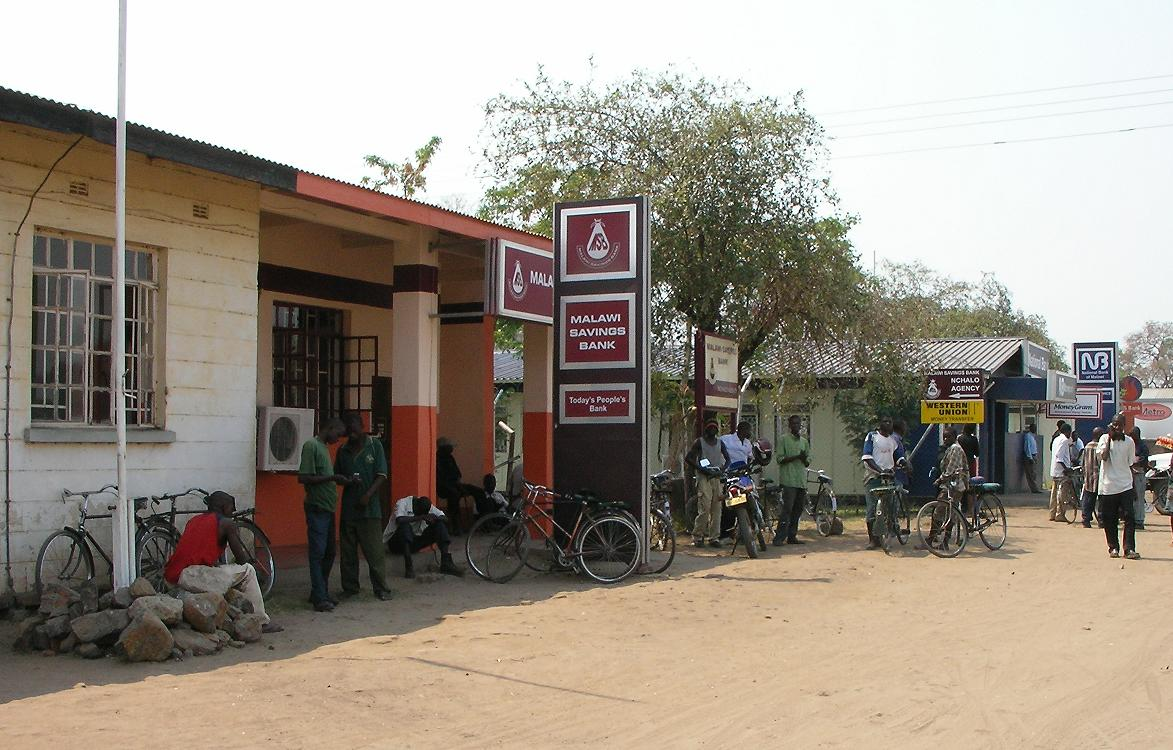
- Banks in Nchalo in 2008

- Location in Malawi
- Coordinates: 16°15′51″S 34°52′4″E
- Country: Malawi
- Region: Southern Region
- District: Chikwawa District
- Climate: Cwa

Nchalo is a town in the Chikwawa District of southern Malawi. The Illovo Sugar Malawi own the nearby sugar plantation which is the town's major employer. However the majority of the population are living off the land. The town and the nearby village of Kanseche are by the huge Shire River. The area is prone to storms, flooding and drought which are exacerbated by climate change. Seven died in the 2022 floods and a court case is scheduled for 2027.

== Transport ==
Nchalo is close to Chikwawa. It is on the M1 main road and it's airport is Sucoma Airport whose runway is over 700 metres long. Historically the main transport was via the River Shire which is the major river flowing out of Lake Malawi. The river is infested with crocodiles.

== Commerce ==
Nchalo has a few shops, a market and it is the entrance to the sugar plantation. The plantation has an 18 hole golf course, tennis courts, swimming pool and places to stay and its own small wildlife park. The major wildlife park is Lengwe National Park which is nearby.

== Sugar production and flooding ==
In 2015 the government declared a disaster zone when there was wide spread flooding in the area. Médecins Sans Frontières treated people at a camp at Nchalo and food was distributed here.

The majority of people live by farming. In 2021 the town was at risk from "Common and severe effects of flooding, storms, and drought" this threat was increased by climate change. A survey by the Africa Migration Climate Initiative of the town said that 72% of the population did not intend to move. Of those who wanted to move they mainly lacked the resources to do so.

Sugar production began after 1949 when the possibility was researched. It was hoped that the importation of sugar could be prevented. The British Lonrho Ltd negotiated the lease of 11,770 acres on a 99 year lease from the government in the 1960s. 9,000 acres could have been planted, but by 1966 there was 4,300 acres planted. Significantly this was enough to satisfy the national demand for sugar, which was around 20,000 tons, as land was yielding between 25,000 and 30,000 tons. This had the effect of reducing foreign currency imports by nearly a million pounds per year.

The Illovo Sugar Malawi own the plantation and they are owned by Associated British Foods in the 2020s. The local Member of Parliament is George Qoma, he encouraged his Chikwawa Central West constituents in 2026 to support the sugar company. He noted that they were building a road of use to constituents. The company are involved with a dispute with a nearby village of Kanseche. The village was damaged and seven people were never found after they were swept away in a flood on 24 January 2022. Five hundred households in 2026 were still living in temporary structures. It is alleged that the flood was deflected into the village by an embankment built by the sugar plantation. The company had received advice about flooding. One thousand seven hundred villagers are involved in the resulting court case. In June 2026 the villagers heard that their case would be begin in the British High Court in May 2027. They are represented by Margherita Cornaglia, Catherine Dobson and Kate Boakes. Associated British Foods deny any involvement, but want the case to come before a court in Malawi. They say the case is "preventing the work needed to improve living conditions in Kanseche by hindering Illovo Sugar Malawi’s ability to communicate with the villagers."
