= Nkhula A Hydroelectric Power Station =

Hydroelectric power station in Malawi

- Country: Malawi
- Location: Malawi
- Coordinates: 15°30′44″S 34°50′05″E
- Status: Under Renovations
- Commission date: 2018 (expected)
- Owner: Electricity Generation Company Malawi Limited
- Operator: Electricity Generation Company Malawi Limited

Thermal power station
- Primary fuel: Hydropower

Power generation
- Nameplate capacity: 36 MW (48,000 hp)

The Nkhula A Hydroelectric Power Station, also Nhula A Hydroelectric Power Station, is a hydroelectric power plant on the Shire River in Malawi. It has an installed capacity of 36 megawatts (48,000 hp), with three 12 megawatts (16,000 hp) generating sets. The power was developed in stages, with the first phase involving the installation of three 8 megawatts-generating turbines. Phase I of the power station was officially opened in 1966.

In April 2017, the Electricity Generation Company Malawi Limited (Egenco), began the first major overhaul of the power station since its inception, over 50 years earlier. The overhaul involves the replacement of the old power generators with new modern generators with new capacity of 36 megawatts. The ongoing renovations are expected to conclude in July 2018.

== Location ==
The power station is located across the Shire River, in Chikwawa District, in the Southern Region of Malawi, approximately 50 kilometres (31 mi), by road, north-west of Blantyre, the financial capital and largest city in the country. The geographical coordinates of this power station are: 15°30'44.0"S, 34°50'05.0"E (Latitude: 15.512222; Longitude: 34.834722).

== Overview ==
Nkhula A was the first major hydroelectric power station built in Malawi. The power station was built in two phases, with the first phase completed in 1966. The second phase involved major overhaul of the power plant and expansion of capacity from 24 megawatts to 36 megawatts. This upgrade was expected to conclude in July 2018. The new turbines are expected to serve for the next 25 years.

== See also ==
- List of power stations in Malawi
- List of power stations in Africa
