= Kapichira Hydroelectric Power Station =

Power station in Malawi

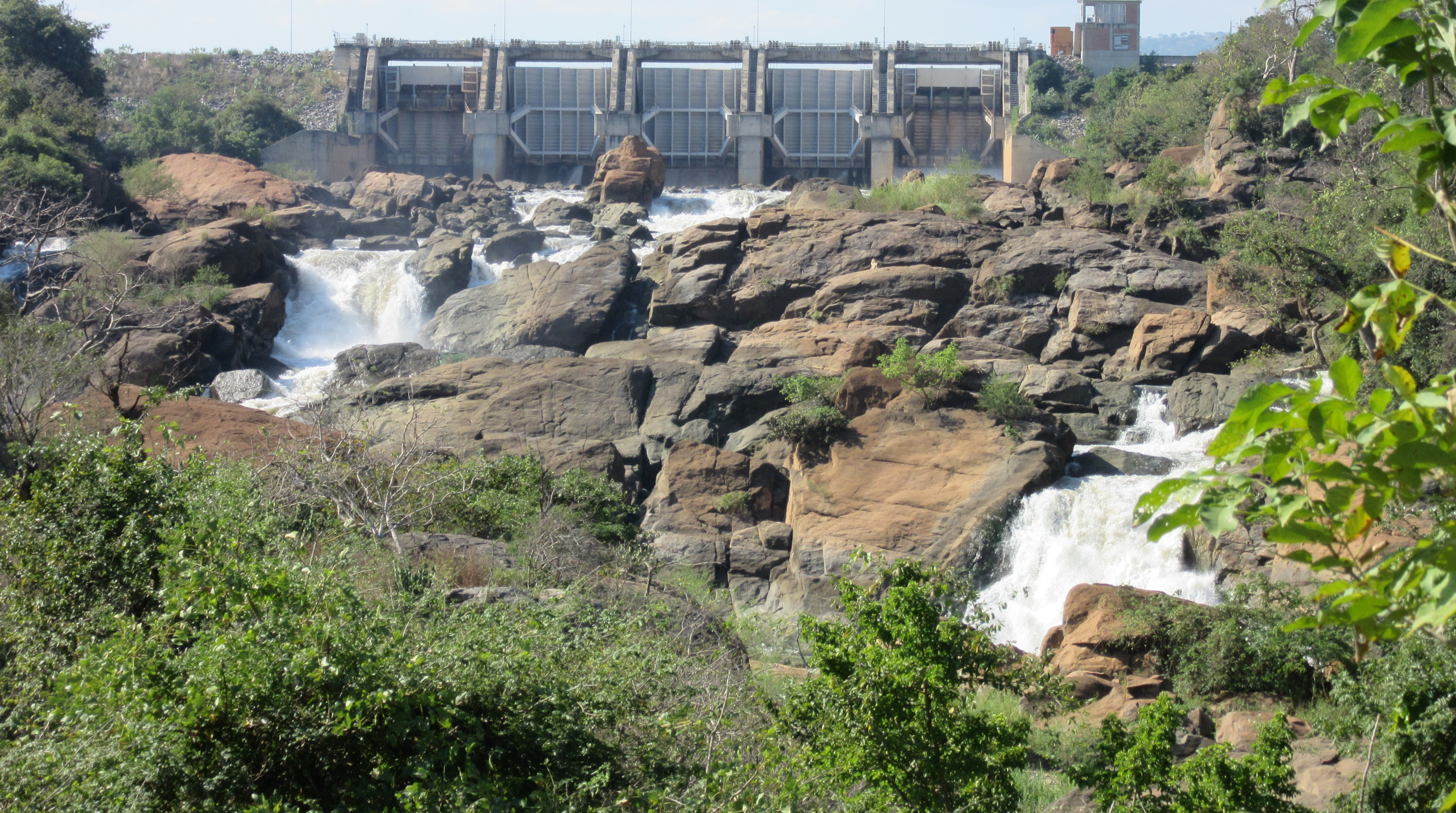
- Kapachira Falls including the Kapichira Hydroelectric Power Station

- Map of Malawi showing the location of Kapichira HPP Kapichira Hydroelectric Power Station (Africa) Kapichira Hydroelectric Power Station (Earth)
- Country: Malawi
- Location: Kapachira Falls, Chikwawa District, Southern Region
- Coordinates: 15°53′45″S 34°45′14″E
- Purpose: Power
- Status: Operational
- Opening date: 2000
- Construction cost: US$153 million (Phase 1)
- Owner: Government of Malawi
- Operator: Electricity Supply Commission of Malawi

Dam and spillways
- Impounds: Shire River

Power Station
- Turbines: 4 x 32 MW
- Installed capacity: 128 megawatts (172,000 hp)

The Kapichira Power Station is a hydroelectric power plant at the Kapachira Falls on the Shire River in Malawi. It has an installed capacity of 128 megawatts (172,000 hp), enough to power over 86,000 homes, with four 32 megawatts (43,000 hp) generating sets. The power station was developed in stages, with the first phase involving the installation of the first two 32 megawatts-generating turbines. Phase I of the power station was officially opened in September 2000.

During a ceremony in January 2014, then president of Malawi, Joyce Banda, switched on the second phase of the Kapichira hydropower project, which doubled the previous 64 megawatts to the maximum capacity of 128 megawatts.

== Location ==
The power station is located across the Shire River, in Chikwawa District, in the Southern Region of Malawi, approximately 70 kilometres (43 mi), by road, south-west of Blantyre, the financial capital and largest city in the country. The geographical coordinates of this power station are: 15°53'45.0"S, 34°45'14.0"E (Latitude:-15.895833; Longitude:34.753889).

== Overview ==
Each unit operates at a nominal head of 54 metres (177 ft) and discharge of 67 cubic metres per second (2,400 cu ft/s). The power station was built in two phases, with the first phase completed in 2000. The second phase with the same capacity of 64 megawatts (86,000 hp) as the first phase, was completed in 2014 and commissioned on 31 January 2018.

== Construction ==
The first phase of the power station was built with funds borrowed from several international development partners, including KfW, the European Investment Bank, the Commonwealth Development Corporation, the World Bank, and the Netherlands Development Finance Company. The development partners jointly loaned US$131.1 million and the government of Malawi invested US$21.9 million, for a total of US$153 million. The second phase was contracted to China Gezhouba Group Corporation (CGGC) and included the installation of two new turbines, each with a 32-megawatt generation capacity. Work was completed in January 2014.

== Storm damage and repairs ==
On 24 January 2022, Tropical Storm Ana struck the dam and power station, causing catastrophic damage, leading to closure of the installation. This led to the loss of an estimated 130 MW of generation capacity, equivalent to about 30 percent of national output.

In June 2022, Lazarus Chakwera, the president of Malawi, announced that the World Bank had lent Malawi MWK:60 billion (US$60 million) to repair and rehabilitate Kapichira Hydroelectric Power Station. Following these repairs, it is expected that the new generation capacity will be 135 megawatts.

== See also ==
- List of power stations in Malawi
- List of power stations in Africa
