= Tedzani Hydroelectric Power Station =

Hydroelectric power station in Malawi

- Location of Tedzani Power Station; Placement on map is approximate Tedzani Hydroelectric Power Station (Africa) Tedzani Hydroelectric Power Station (Earth)
- Location: Tedzani, Chikwawa District, Southern Region, Malawi
- Coordinates: 15°33′34″S 34°46′38″E
- Owner: Electricity Generation Company Malawi Limited

Dam and spillways
- Type of dam: Gravity dam
- Impounds: Shire River

Power Station
- Commission date: 1973, 1977, 1996 & 2021
- Turbines: 8
- Installed capacity: 111.7 MW (149,800 hp)
- Annual generation: ~500 GWh

The Tedzani Hydroelectric Power Station, also Tedzani Hydroelectric Power Complex, is a complex of integrated hydroelectric power plants across the Shire River in Malawi. It has installed capacity of 111.7 megawatts (149,800 hp), with four power stations adjacent to each other, sharing some of the physical infrastructure and electro-mechanical connections.

The electricity generating complex was developed in stages, with the first phase Tedzani I, completed in 1973, and the most recent, Tedzani IV, which achieved commercial commissioning in May 2021.

== Location ==
The power stations of this electricity-generation complex are located across the Shire River, in Chikwawa District, in the Southern Region of Malawi, approximately 7 kilometres (4 mi), downstream of the Nkhula B Hydroelectric Power Station. This is approximately 65 kilometres (40 mi), by road, north-west of Blantyre, the financial capital and largest city in the country. The geographical coordinates of the power stations of Tedzani Hydroelectric Power Complex are: 15°33'34.0"S, 34°46'38.0"E (Latitude:-15.559444; Longitude:34.777222).

== The power stations ==
=== Tedzani I Hydroelectric Power Station ===
The first to be developed, Tedzani I was brought online in 1973. It consists of two turbines, each with a capacity of 10 megawatts (13,000 hp), bringing the total capacity at this power station to 20 megawatts (27,000 hp).

=== Tedzani II Hydroelectric Power Station ===
Completed in 1977, Tedzani II has two power-generation units of 10 megawatts (13,000 hp) each, bringing capacity at this power station to 20 megawatts (27,000 hp).

=== Tedzani III Hydroelectric Power Station ===
Tedzani III was the third power station in the complex to be completed, coming online in 1996. It consists of two generators of 26.35 megawatts (35,340 hp) each, bringing capacity at this power station to 52.7 megawatts (70,700 hp).

=== Tedzani IV Hydroelectric Power Station ===
In July 2017, the Electricity Generation Company Malawi Limited (Egenco) signed agreements with the Mitsubishi Corporation and with Calik Enerji, to build Tedzani IV. The 19 megawatts (25,000 hp) power station was built with a US$52 million grant assistance obtained from the Japanese International Cooperation Agency and a US$4.8 million equity investment by the Malawian government (total US$56.8 million). Commercial commissioning was achieved in May 2021.

== See also ==
- List of power stations in Malawi
- List of power stations in Africa
