= Nkhula B Hydroelectric Power Station =

Hydroelectric power station in Malawi

- Country: Malawi
- Location: Malawi
- Coordinates: 15°31′34″S 34°49′12″E
- Status: Operational
- Commission date: 1992
- Owner: Electricity Generation Company Malawi Limited
- Operator: Electricity Generation Company Malawi Limited

Thermal power station
- Primary fuel: Hydropower

Power generation
- Nameplate capacity: 100 MW (130,000 hp)

The Nkhula B Hydroelectric Power Station, also Nkula B Hydroelectric Power Station is a hydroelectric power plant on the Shire River in Malawi. It has a power generating capacity of 100 megawatts (130,000 hp).

== Location ==
Nkhula B Power Station is located across the Shire River, in Blantyre District, in the Southern Region of Malawi, approximately 50 kilometres (31 mi), by road, north-west of Blantyre, the financial capital and largest city in Malawi. The geographical coordinates of Nkhula B Power Station are: 15°31'40.0"S, 34°49'14.0"E (Latitude:-15.527778; Longitude:34.820556).

== Overview ==
Nkhula B Power Station was built in stages in the 1980s and the 1990s. The first three power generators of 20 megawatts each, were installed in 1980. Another 20 megawatt generator was added in 1986. The fifth 20 MW turbine was installed in 1992.

The power station was closed for major repairs in March 2017. Those renovations included the construction of a new switch-yard and power house. The work was carried out by Andritz Hydro of Austria and Mota-Engil of Portugal.

In 2018, the inlet valve to the power station, valued at MWK:800,000,000 (approx. €1.18 million) was replaced.

== See also ==
- List of power stations in Malawi
- List of power stations in Africa
