= Bwengu Solar Power Station =

Solar farm in Malawi

- Country: Malawi
- Location: Bwengu, Mzimba District, Northern Region
- Coordinates: 11°03′28″S 33°54′58″E
- Status: Under construction
- Construction began: February 2022
- Commission date: (target was) February 2023
- Construction cost: US$65 million
- Owner: Bwengu Solar Consortium
- Operator: Bwegu Solar

Solar farm
- Type: Flat-panel PV

Power generation
- Nameplate capacity: 50 MW (67,000 hp)

The Bwengu Solar Power Station is a 50 megawatt solar power plant, under construction in Bwengu in northern Malawi. The power station is under development by a consortium led by Quantel Renewable Energy, an independent power producer (IPP), based in the United States. Construction began in February 2022. An additional $10m was invested by a Sri Lankan company in 2023. The energy generated at this solar farm was expected to be sold to the Electricity Supply Corporation of Malawi (ESCOM), under a long-term power purchase agreement (PPA).

== Location ==
The power station was under construction on 105 hectares (260 acres), in the community of Ulalo Nyirenda, in the town of Bwengu, in the Mzimba District, in Malawi's Northern Region.

Bwengu is located approximately 150 kilometres (93 mi) by road northeast of Mzimba, the location of the district headquarters. This is about 54 kilometres (34 mi), by road, northwest of the city of Mzuzu, the regional headquarters. Bwengu lies approximately 409 kilometres (254 mi), by road, north of Lilongwe, the capital city of Malawi.

== Overview ==
The design of the solar farm calls for a generation capacity of 50 megawatts. The power generated here will be evacuated to an ESCOM substation, less than 1 kilometre (1 mi) from the solar farm, where it will be intergraded into the national grid. The off-taker will be Power Market Limited (PML), the sole national bulk electricity transmitter and a component of ESCOM.

== Developers ==
The consortium that owns and is developing this power station, comprises three entities as listed in the table below. The owners are expected to form a special purpose vehicle (SPV) company to develop, finance, build, own, operate and maintain the power station. For descriptive purposes, the SPV company is referred to here as Bwengu Solar Consortium.

Shareholders in Bwengu Solar Consortium
Rank	IPP/developer	Domicile	Notes
1	Quantel Renewable Energy	United States	
2	Frontier Energy	Denmark	
3	Vidullanka Plc	Sri Lanka	

== Other considerations ==
The Malawian government plans to increase national generation capacity from 532 megawatts in 2022 to 1,000 MW by 2025. Bwengu Solar Power Station helps the country progress towards that goal by providing 50 megawatts of clean renewable energy, reducing the country's carbon dioxide footprint and increasing the country's population with connection to grid electricity.

== See also ==
- List of power stations in Malawi
- Golomoti Solar Power Station
