= Elephant Marsh =

Marsh in Malawi

Designations

Ramsar Wetland
- Official name: Elephant Marsh
- Designated: 1 July 2017
- Reference no.: 2308

Elephant Marsh lies on the flood plain of the Lower Shire River in the African country of Malawi, between the towns of Chikwawa and Nsanje. The marsh varies in size from 150 to 450 square miles (390 to 1,170 km^{2}) depending on the flow of the Shire and Ruo rivers and has no permanent boundary. In some places, floating mats of vegetation are so thick boat travel is nearly impossible. The Ruo River, the largest tributary of the Shire and the southeastern boundary between Malawi and Mozambique, merges with the Shire in the Elephant Marsh.

The marsh was named by David Livingstone in 1859, who counted as many as 800 elephants in one sighting. Today, the elephants are largely gone, but Elephant Marsh supports a large number of aquatic birds as well as hippopotamus. The marsh is similar to swampy Lake Chilwa, located 200 miles (320 km) to the north. Boat trips through Elephant Marsh can be arranged from nearby Lengwe National Park.
