= Chikwawa =

Town in the Southern Region of Malawi

Coordinates: 16.035°S 34.801°E

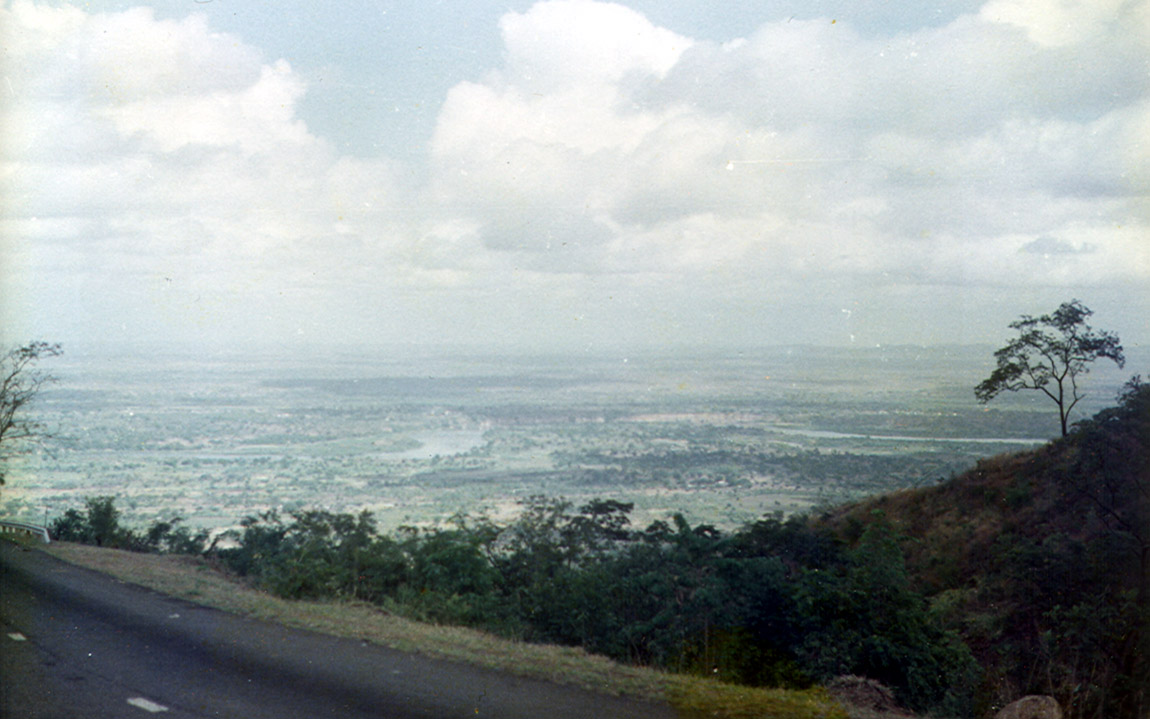
View of the Elephant Marsh near Chikwawa from the Chikwawa-Blantyre road

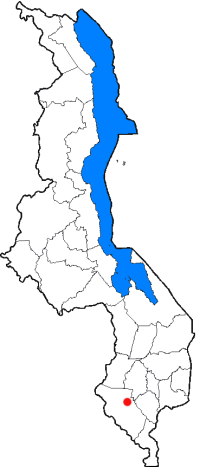
The location of Chikwawa in Malawi (at the red dot)

Chikwawa is a town with a population of 6,114 according to the 2018 census located in the Southern Region of Malawi on the west bank of the Shire River. It is the administrative capital of the Chikwawa District. Chikwawa lies almost 50 kilometres (30 mi) south of Blantyre, the commercial capital of Malawi.

Chikwawa, then known as Chibisa's village, was the first town in Malawi to be seen by European explorers, when visited in March 1859 by David Livingstone's second Zambesi expedition. Their way upstream was blocked by the Kapachira Falls, and they returned in August for land exploration which reached Lake Malawi on 18 September. Two of the missionaries accompanying Dr Livingstone, belonging to the Universities Mission to the Central Africa (UMCA) Dr Dickinson and Rev. Scudamore died in the district and were buried in Chisanja-Julius Village along the Shire River, a walkable distance from the Kamuzu Bridge.

The surrounding region was ravaged by Portuguese slave traders in the nineteenth century.

The Majete Wildlife Reserve, the Mwabvi Wildlife Reserve and Lengwe National Park lie in the vicinity of Chikwawa. Large numbers of hippopotamus and crocodiles inhabit the Shire River area.
