= Matambo–Phombeya High Voltage Power Line =

Southern African high voltage power line

Location
- Country: Mozambique and Malawi
- Coordinates: 15°15′51″S 34°53′06″E
- General direction: West to East
- From: Matambo, Mozambique
- To: Phombeya, Malawi

Ownership information
- Owner: Government of Mozambique & Government of Malawi
- Partners: KfW, World Bank, European Investment Bank
- Operator: Electricidade de Mocambique & Electricity Supply Commission of Malawi

Construction information
- Construction started: April 2022
- Expected: Completion November 2023
- Construction cost: US$154 million

Technical information
- Current type: AC
- Total length: 218 km (135 mi)
- AC voltage: 400kV
- No. of circuits: 2

The Matambo–Phombeya High Voltage Power Line is a high voltage electricity power line under construction, connecting the high voltage substation at Matambo, Tete Province, Mozambique to another high voltage substation at Phombeya, Balaka District, Malawi.

== Location ==
The power line starts at Matambo, in Tete Province Mozambique, at a 400kV substation there. The power line would travel in a general north-eastern direction to the Mozambique/Malawi border, approximately 140 kilometres (87 mi) away. From there, the power line would continue into Malawi for another 78 kilometres (48 mi), to end at Phombeya, Balaka District, Malawi, for a total length of 218 kilometres (135 mi).

== Overview ==
The construction of this power line has been on the books, as far back as 2007. The World Bank initially approved a $93 million line of credit for this project, but cancelled it in 2010. The main objective of the electricity transmission project is to connect the electricity grids of Malawi and Mozambique. This will allow Malawi to purchase 50 megawatts of power from the Cahora Bassa Hydroelectric Power Station in Mozambique. Also, through the interconnections of the Southern African Power Pool (SAPP), Malawi will be able to import a further 150 megawatts from South Africa through the same power line.

== Construction in Mozambique ==
The length of the power line in Mozambique is approximately 140 kilometres (87 mi). The entire project in both countries is valued at US$154 million, borrowed from the World Bank, KfW and the European Investment Bank.

The engineering, procurement and construction (EPC) contract was awarded to L&T Infrastructure Development Projects Limited (Lasern & Toubro), an Indian company. L&T will lay the line from the Matambo electricity substation to the community of Zobue at the international border with Malawi, a distance of about 142 kilometres (88 mi). That line will cost over US$35 million. The new 400kV substation at Matambo will be constructed by a consortium comprising Sinohydro of China and Cepco1 of Malaysia, at a budgeted cost of US$21 million.

== Construction in Malawi ==
Work in Malawi involves the construction of 78 kilometres (48 mi) of a double-circuit 400kV transmission line and expansion of the electric substation at Phombeya. Each country is responsible for the transmission infrastructure within its territory. Completion of this energy infrastructure is expected in 2023.

In 2019 the World Bank lent US$15 million to the government of Malawi towards the construction of this line, along with a new 220kV substation in Phombeya, Malawi.

== See also ==
- Southern African Power Pool
- Energy in Malawi
