= List of power stations in Malawi =

Wikipedia list page

This article lists power stations in Malawi. All stations are owned by the Electricity Supply Commission of Malawi (ESCOM). The list is not exhaustive.

== Hydroelectric ==
Hydroelectric station	Coordinates	Type	Capacity (MW)	Year completed	Name of reservoir	River
Kapichira Power Station	15°53′45″S 34°45′14″E	Run of river	128	2000 & 2014	N/A	Shire River
Nkhula A Power Station	15°30′44″S 34°50′05″E	Run of river	24	1966	N/A	Shire River
Nkhula B Power Station	15°31′40″S 34°49′14″E	Run of river	100	1980, 1986 & 1992	N/A	Shire River
Tedzani I Power Station	15°33′34″S 34°46′38″E	Run of river	20	1973	N/A	Shire River
Tedzani II Power Station	15°33′34″S 34°46′38″E	Run of river	20	1977	N/A	Shire River
Tedzani III Power Station	15°33′34″S 34°46′38″E	Run of river	62	1996	N/A	Shire River
Tedzani IV Power Station	15°33′34″S 34°46′38″E	Run of river	19.1	2021	N/A	Shire River
Wovwe Power Station	10°28′18″S 34°10′20″E	Run of river	4.35	1995	N/A	Wovwe River
Mpatamanga Power Station	15°43′11″S 34°43′35″E	Reservoir	350	2030 (expected)	Mpatamanga Reservoir	Shire River
Songwe Power Station	09°27′11″S 33°05′47″E	Reservoir	370.2	Expected to get commissioned in 2029	Songwe Basin Reservoir	Songwe River
Kholombidzo Power Station	15°23′41″S 34°53′39″E	Run of river	200	N/A	N/A	Shire River

== Thermal ==
Thermal power station	Coordinates	Fuel	Capacity	Year completed	Notes
Kammwamba Power Station	15°27′36″S 34°50′37″E	Coal	300 MW	2022 (expected)	Expandable to 1,000 MW

== Solar ==
Solar power station	Community	Coordinates	Fuel type	Capacity (megawatts)	Year completed	Name of owner	Notes
Kanzimbe Solar Power Station	Salima District	13°36′31″S 34°24′37″E	Solar	60	2021	JCM Power of Canada	Operational since 16 November 2021
Nanjoka Solar Power Station	Salima District	13°44′34″S 34°22′11″E	Solar	20	2025	Electricity Generation Company Malawi Limited (EGENCO)	Under construction
Nkhotakota Solar Power Station	Nkhotakota District	12°57′26″S 34°17′26″E	Solar	21	2023 Expected	Phanes Group of UAE & Serengeti Energy Limited of Kenya	Under construction
Golomoti Solar Power Station	Dedza District	14°25′41″S 34°36′16″E	Solar	20	2022	InfraCo Africa and JCM Power	Operational since May 2022
Bwengu Solar Power Station	Mzimba District	11°03′28″S 33°54′58″E	Solar	50	2023 Expected	Bwengu Solar Consortium	Under construction
Dwangwa Solar Power Station	Nkhotakota District	12°25′57″S 34°08′13″E	Solar	55	2025 Expected	Voltalia of France	Under development

== See also ==
- List of power stations in Africa
- List of largest power stations in the world
