= Bwengu =

- village
- Location in Malawi
- Coordinates: 11.0636864°S 33.9140516°E
- Country: Malawi
- Region: Northern Region
- District: Mzimba District
- Time zone: UTC+2

Bwengu is a community in Malawi's Mzimba District. It is approximately 150 kilometres (93 mi) by road northeast of Mzimba. and about 54 kilometres (34 mi), by road, northwest of the city of Mzuzu. Bwengu is approximately 409 kilometres (254 mi), by road, north of Lilongwe, the capital city of Malawi.

== Description ==
Bwengu has a primary school and the Community Day Secondary School has about 400 students. The primary school obtained desks for the children to sit at in 2025. The school has links with Crescent School in Rugby. In 2023, a new computer classroom was installed in the secondary school. The school has an attendance of over 90% in the lower part of the secondary school and over 70% in the upper part. Roughly three quarters of the adult population are literate.

Bwengu has a football team. It was one of several in Mzimba North constituency who competed for a K6.5m prize offered by Rosemary Mkandawire in 2018. Mkandawire was a former CEO of Toyota Malawi and at that time a prospective parliamentary candidate. In 2025 Catherine Mzumara announced a 15 million Kwacha football tournament to run over several months accompanied by talks and traditional dancing. Mzumara was elected.

Bwengu Solar Power Station was under construction on 105 hectares (260 acres) of land, in the hamlet of Ulalo Nyirenda, in 2022.
