= Salima Solar Power Station =

Salima Solar Power Station may refer to:

- Kanzimbe Solar Power Station in Kanzimbe, Salima District, Central Region, Malawi
- Nanjoka Solar Power Station in Nanjoka, Salima District, Central Region, Malawi
