= Dwangwa Solar Power Station =

Solar park in Malawi

- Country: Malawi
- Location: Dwangwa, Central Region
- Coordinates: 12°25′57″S 34°08′13″E
- Status: Proposed
- Construction began: 2024 (expected)
- Commission date: 2025 (expected)
- Owner: Voltalia of France

Solar farm
- Type: Flat-panel PV

Power generation
- Nameplate capacity: 55 MW (74,000 hp)

The Dwangwa Solar Power Station is a 55 MW (74,000 hp) solar power plant under development in Malawi. The power station, owned and under development by Voltalia, the French multinational independent power producer (IPP), has an attached 10MWh battery energy storage system (BESS), raising the power station's generation capacity to 65 MW. The electric power generated here will be sold to the national electricity parastatal utility company, Electricity Supply Corporation of Malawi (ESCOM), under a 20-year power purchase agreement (PPA).

== Location ==
The power station is located in Dwangwa, in Central Region of Malawi, on the western shores of Lake Malawi. Dwangwa is located approximately 256 kilometres (159 mi) northeast of Lilongwe, the capital city of Malawi.

== Overview ==
The power station has a 55 megawatt ground-mounted photovoltaic panel capacity. It also has an attached 10MWh BESS capacity. Its output is planned to be sold directly to ESCOM for integration into the Malawian national grid.

== Developers ==
The power station is under development by Voltalia, the French multinational IPP based in Paris, France, which owns it.

== Construction, funding, and timetable ==
The construction costs have not yet been disclosed. The International Finance Corporation (IFC), an arm of the World Bank Group has committed to support this renewable energy infrastructure project in the form of a construction loan. Construction was expected to begin in H2 2024, with commercial commissioning expected in H2 2025.

== See also ==
- List of power stations in Malawi
