= Mpatamanga Hydroelectric Power Station =

Dam in Mpatamanga, Blantyre, Malawi

- Map showing the location of Mpatamanga
- Country: Malawi
- Location: Mpatamanga, Blantyre District
- Coordinates: 15°43′11″S 34°43′35″E
- Purpose: Power
- Status: Proposed

Dam and spillways
- Impounds: Shire River

Mpatamanga Power Station
- Commission date: 2032 (expected)
- Installed capacity: 358.5 megawatts (480,800 hp)
- Annual generation: 1,544 GWh

The Mpatamanga Hydro Power Project is a 350 MW hydroelectric generating project under development at Mpatamanga on the Shire River, in Malawi. The project will comprise the Main Power Station and the Regulating Dam Power Station. Mpatamanga Hydro Power Limited (MHPL), a special purpose vehicle, has been established for purposes of the project which will sell 100 percent of its production to Malawi's national utility, ESCOM, as off-taker under a 30-year power purchase agreement (PPA”. The project will assist the Government of Malawi to meet existing power demand during both peak and off-peak periods, becoming the main source of generation.

The Mpatamanga Hydropower Project will not only double the installed capacity of hydropower in Malawi, but also improve the power supply security, provide opportunities for increased renewable energy generation capacity in the country and contribute to the controlling of the flow of the Shire River downstream the power plant. Mpatamanga will deliver electricity to approximately two million people and save 520,000 tons of CO_{2} emissions per year. The project is expected to contribute to reducing energy shortages and enhancing energy security in Malawi.

== Location ==
The power station will be located at Mpatamanga, on the Shire River, in Blantyre District, in the Southern Region of Malawi. This is approximately 53 kilometres (33 mi), by road, north-west of the city of Blantyre, the financial capital and largest city in the country. The coordinates of the village of Mpatamanga are: 15°43'11.0"S, 34°43'35.0"E (Latitude:-15.719722; Longitude:34.726389).

== Overview ==
The 358.5 MW facility will be a first-of-its-kind in Malawi and the generation facility will be composed of two plants. The main dam will provide flexible generation up to its 309 MW installed capacity. The powerhouse can be used at peak capacity for up to nine hours per day to meet peak demand. The regulating dam, 7 km downstream, is expected to return the river's flow to its natural level, minimizing the Environmental & Social (E&S) impacts. 52 MW of additional generation capacity (run-of-the-river) will be built at the regulating dam. The average annual generation is estimated at 1,470 GWh[FO1], out of which 70 percent is expected to be produced during peak hours, with an average capacity factor of 49 percent.

The main dam includes a 50 metres (164 ft) high roller compacted concrete (RCC) dam and integrated spillway to create a 19 square kilometres (7 sq mi) storage reservoir with storage capacity of 261,000,000 cubic metres (9.217128014×10^{9} cu ft), of which 59,000,000 cubic metres (2.083565337×10^{9} cu ft) will available daily. Part of the design are one diversion tunnel, two 920 metres (3,018 ft) long headrace tunnels with surge shafts and underground penstocks and a surface powerhouse with four vertical Francis turbines. The regulating dam includes a 35 metres (115 ft) high concrete dam and spillway, creating a regulating reservoir with 8,200,000 cubic metres (289,580,267 cu ft) active storage and a low head surface powerhouse integrated within the dam with 2 horizontal bulb turbines. The interconnection comprises: (a) building a 400 kV double-circuit transmission line measuring 64 kilometres (40 mi) (b) a 132 kV double-circuit transmission line loop measuring 11.4 kilometres (7 mi) to a switchyard of the existing 132 kV line to Tedzani/Kapichira.

== Timeline ==
Technical studies are currently underway to inform the final engineering design of the Mpatamanga Hydro Power Plant. These are: Hydrology studies; Climate change study; Topography/bathymetry/light detection and ranging (LIDAR) investigations; Sediment studies; and Geophysical and geotechnical studies. Construction of access roads is planned to be undertaken from Q4 2025. A four-year construction schedule has been estimated for the Project, starting in 2026. The power stations’ commissioning should take place in Q4 2030.In August 2024, a number of companies and consortia were shortlisted to compete for the EPC contracts in the categories of (a) civil works (b) electro-mechanical works and (c) transmission lines & substations, as outlined in this reference.

== Developments ==
The Mpatamanga Hydro Power Project is co-developed by SN Malawi BV (Scatec) and EDF International, Electricity Generation Company (Malawi) Limited (EGENCO) and IFC through a private public partnership. This entails the development, design, financing, construction, commissioning, ownership, operation and maintenance of the hydroelectric generating project of 358.5 MW capacity at Mpatamanga on the Shire River, in Malawi, and to develop, design, finance, construct and handover the Transmission Infrastructure. Mpatamanga Hydro Power Limited (MHPL), a special purpose vehicle, has been established for purposes of the Project which will sell 100 percent of its production to Malawi's national utility, ESCOM, as off-taker under a 30-year power purchase agreement (PPA). The consortium developing this power station was announced to include the following entities as illustrated in the table below.

Composition of Mpatamanga HPP Consortium In 2022
Rank	Developer	Domicile	Percentage	Notes
1	Government of Malawi	Malawi	30.0	
2	IFC InfraVentures	United States	15.0	
3	Électricité de France	France	27.5	
4	Scatec ASA	Norway	14.0	
5	British International Investment and Norfund	United Kingdom & Norway	13.5	
	Total		100.00	

== Funding ==
The development was designed as a public-private partnership arrangement with the Government of Malawi owning a 30 percent stake. The total cost of development is budgeted at over US$1.5 billion. In 2022, following international competitive bidding, the government selected a consortium comprising Electricité de France (EDF), SN Malawi BV (owned by British International Investment), Norfund, and TotalEnergies as the project's "strategic sponsors".

== See also ==
- List of power stations in Malawi
- List of hydropower stations in Africa
- List of hydroelectric power stations
