= Kanzimbe Solar Power Station =

Malawian solar farm

- Country: Malawi
- Location: Kanzimbe, Khombedza TA, Salima District, Central Province
- Coordinates: 13°42′45″S 34°19′32″E
- Status: Operational
- Construction began: December 2018
- Commission date: November 2021
- Construction cost: US$80 million
- Owner: JCM Matswana Solar Corporation

Solar farm
- Type: Flat-panel PV
- Site area: 168 hectares (420 acres)

Power generation
- Nameplate capacity: 60 megawatts (80,000 hp)
- Annual net output: 154 GWh

Kanzimbe Solar Power Station is a 60 megawatts (80,000 hp) solar power plant, in Malawi, in Southern Africa. The power station was constructed between December 2018 and November 2021.

== Location ==
The power station is located in the neighborhood known as Kanzimbe, in Khombeza Traditional Area, in Salima District, on the south-western banks of Lake Malawi, approximately 110 kilometres (68 mi), by road, north-east of Lilongwe, Malawi's capital city. Salima is located about 119 kilometres (74 mi) by road, south of the town of Nkhotakota, on the western coast of Lake Malawi. The power station is located here.

== Overview ==
As of 2018, Malawi was reported to have the lowest electrification rate in the World, with a per capital consumption estimated at 93 kWh per year compared with an average of 432 kWh for Sub-Saharan Africa and 2,167 kWh per year for the World average. There is urgency for Malawi to reach the critical threshold of 500 kWh per year.

As part of efforts to increase electricity output and to diversify Malawi's sources of energy, the country developed this solar power station (60 megawatts), Kammwamba Thermal Power Station (300 megawatts) and Mpatamanga Hydroelectric Power Station (350 megawatts), in the medium term.

The energy generated by this power station is sold to the Electricity Supply Commission of Malawi (Escom), under a 20-year power purchase agreement.

In addition to the solar farm, a new 132kV electricity switchyard and a new 4 kilometres (2 mi) 132kV high voltage transmission line were built to evacuate the generated energy to the Escom 132kV substation at Nanjoka, where it enters the national grid.

== Developers ==
The power station was developed by a consortium comprising three companies as illustrated in the table below:

Members of consortium developing Kanzimbe Solar Power Station
Rank	Shareholder	Domicile	Percentage	Notes
1	JCM Power	Canada		
2	Matswani Capital Private	Malawi		
3	InfraCo Africa	United Kingdom		
	Total		100.00	

JCM Power is a Canadian renewable energy, independent power producer, active in South Asia, Latin America and Sub-Saharan Africa.

== Construction timeline, costs and funding ==
Construction was flagged off in December 2018. The development costs of the power station and related infrastructure were said to be as high as US$80 million.

In July 2021, the Africa Trade Insurance Agency (ATI) insured JCM Matswani Solar Corporation Limited, the special purpose vehicle company (SPVC) that owns, built, operates and maintains the power station against late payments by the power plant off-taker, Electricity Supply Corporation of Malawi (Escom). The ten-year policy cost US$4.4 million. Completion and commercial commissioning were expected in August 2021.

This renewable energy power project benefitted from partial funding from the Netherlands Entrepreneurial Development Bank (FMO Netherlands), totaling US$12.51 million.

== Commercial commissioning ==
The completed solar farm was commissioned by Lazarus Chakwera, the president of Malawi, on 19 November 2021.

== See also ==
- List of power stations in Malawi
- Nanjoka Solar Power Station
