= Bangwe =

- Town
- Location in Malawi
- Coordinates: 15°49′0″S 35°6′0″E
- Country: Malawi
- Region: Southern Region
- Time zone: +2
- Climate: Cwa

Bangwe is a town located in southern Malawi, situated between Mpingwe Hill and Malabvi, and is also near to Bangwe Hill.
