= Wovwe Hydroelectric Power Station =

Power plant in Malawi

- Country: Malawi
- Location: Malawi
- Coordinates: 10°28′18″S 34°10′20″E
- Status: Operational
- Commission date: 1995
- Owner: Electricity Generation Company Malawi Limited
- Operator: Electricity Generation Company Malawi Limited

Thermal power station
- Primary fuel: Hydropower

Power generation
- Nameplate capacity: 4.35 MW (5,830 hp)

The Wovwe Hydroelectric Power Station, also Wovwe Power Station, is a hydroelectric power plant on the Wovwe River in Malawi. It has a capacity of 4.35 megawatts (5,830 hp), with three generation units of 1.45 megawatts each.

== Location ==
The power station is located on the Wovwe River, in Karonga District of the Northern Region of Malawi. By road it is approximately 140 kilometres (87 mi) north of Mzuzu, the capital of the Northern Region of Malawi

== Overview ==
This power station was a donation from the government of Germany. It comprises three power-generation machines of 1.35 megawatts. Wovwe Power Station can be operated on-grid and/or off-grid.

== See also ==
- List of power stations in Malawi
- List of power stations in Africa
