= Enukweni =

- village
- Location in Malawi
- Coordinates: 11°10′31″S 33°53′55″E
- Country: Malawi
- Region: Northern Region
- District: Mzimba District
- Time zone: UTC+2

Enukweni is a community in Malawi's Mzimba District about 50km from Mzuzu city. It is on the M1 road and near the Luwazi river.

== Description ==
In 2017 there had been a confrontation with the police after they refused to hand over a murder suspect to a mob gathered outside.

Enukweni has a football team and they were one of several in Mzimba North constituency who competed for a large K6.5m prize offered by Rosemary Mkandawire in 2018. Mkandawire was a prospective parliamentary candidate.

Catherine Mzumara was the 2015 local candidate. She announced a 15 million Kwacha football tournament to run over several months accompanied by talks and traditional dancing. The first event was in July at Thumbi Primary School. She was elected.

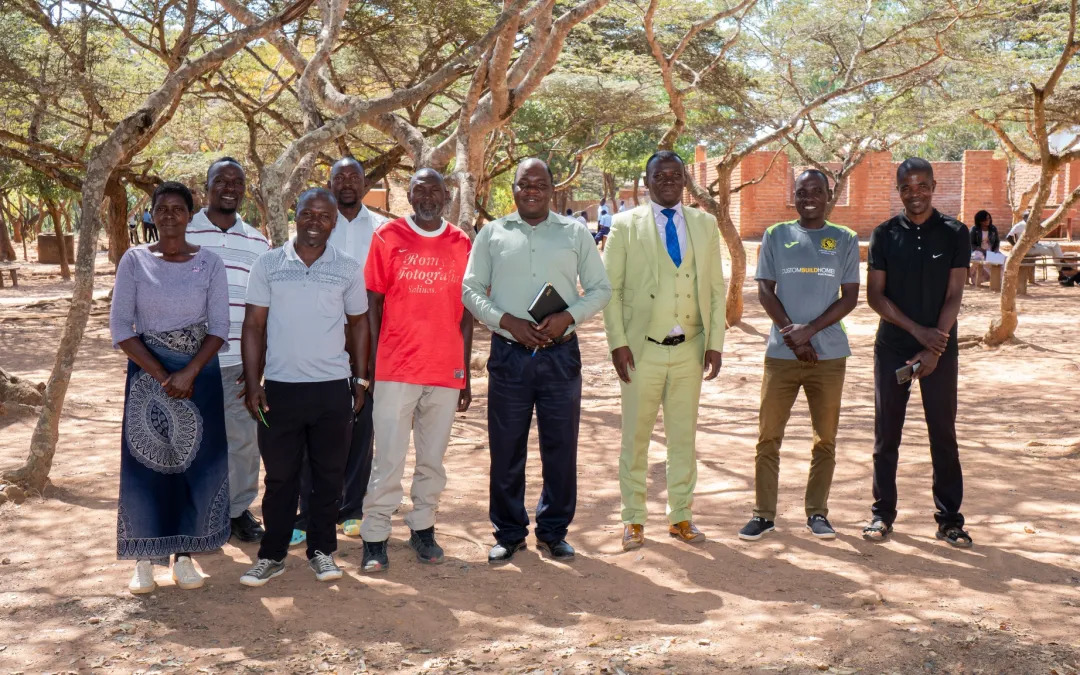
Enukweni Community Day Secondary School in 2023 (image by Malawi Scotland Partnership)

Enukweni Community Day Secondary School has about 320 children. 45,000 euros was donated to rebuild a damaged classroom, train teachers and pay for a room of computers in 2023. The network charges should be addressed by a partnership with a school in Germany.

In 2024 the bridge over the Luwazi river was completed by a second company after the first failed to complete. Three culverts had been created to allow the M1 road to be restored. It had become impassable in January 2021 after water swept away a culvert. Traffic had to be diverted for some time.
