= List of power stations in Sierra Leone =

This article lists all power stations in Sierra Leone.

== Hydroelectric ==
Hydroelectric station	Type	Capacity	Completed	Name of reservoir	River
Bumbuna Hydroelectric Power Station	Reservoir	50 MW	2009	Bumbuna Reservoir	Rokel River
Bankasoka Hydro power (Port Loko)	Run of river	3 MW	2017	N/A	Bankasoka River
Charlotte Falls mini-hydro dam		2.2 MW			Orugu River
Dodo mini-hydro dam	Run of river	6 MW	2007 (upgraded)		
Makali Dam		120kW			
Yele mini-hydro dam		250kW			

== Thermal power ==
Thermal power station	Community	Coordinates	Fuel type	Capacity	Completed	Owner	Notes
King Tom Diesel Power Station	Freetown	8.4929°N 13.2474°W	Diesel fuel	50 MW		Sierra Leone Electricity Corporation	
Port Loko Thermal Power Station	Port Loko		Heavy fuel oil	30 MW			First Steps & Shamshi Private Limited
Sunbird Bioenergy	Makeni		Biomass	32 MW		Sunbird Bioenergy Sierra Leone	

== Solar ==
Solar power station	Community	Coordinates	Capacity	Completed	Owner	Notes
Newton solar park	Freetown		6 MW			
Segbwema mini grid	Kailahun		127 kW			
Panguma mini grid	Kenema		66 kW			
Gbinti mini grid	Karene		79 kW			
Baoma Solar Power Station	Yamandu, Southern Province	8.185556°N 11.798511°W	25 MW	2023 (expected)	Serengeti Energy Limited	

== Hybrid ==
Hybrid power station	Community	Coordinates	Capacity	Completed	Owner	Notes
Baomahun Hybrid Power Station	Baomahun	07°47′19″N 11°40′03″W	23.8 MW (solar); 13.8 MWh (Bess); 21 MW (thermal)	2025 expected	CrossBoundary Energy	

== See also ==
- List of power stations in Africa
- List of largest power stations in the world
