= Nkhotakota Solar Power Station =

Malawian solar farm

- Country: Malawi
- Location: Nkhotakota
- Coordinates: 12°57′26″S 34°17′26″E
- Status: Under expansion
- Construction began: April 2021
- Commission date: March 2023: Phase 1, March 2024: Phase 2 (expected)
- Owner: Nkhotakota Solar
- Operator: Nkhotakota Solar

Solar farm
- Type: Flat-panel PV

Power generation
- Nameplate capacity: 21 MW (28,000 hp) (Under expansion to 38 MW)

Nkhotakota Solar Power Station is an operational, 21 MW (28,000 hp) solar power plant in Malawi. The solar farm, whose first phase, with capacity of 21 MW, was commercially commissioned in March 2023, is under expansion to 38 MW by a consortium comprising independent power producers Phanes Group and Serengeti Energy Limited (formerly responsAbility Renewable Energy Holding - rAREH).

== Location ==
The power station is in town of Nkhotakota, in Malawi's Central Region, approximately 162 kilometres (101 mi), northeast of the city of Lilongwe, the regional headquarters and national capital. Nkhotakota lies on the shores of Lake Malawi, about 95 kilometres (59 mi) southeast of the town of Kamphambale.

== Overview ==
The power station is a joint venture between Phanes Group, an independent solar energy investor and developer based in Dubai, United Arab Emirates and responsAbility Renewable Energy Holding (rAREH), a renewable energy investor based in Nairobi, Kenya. Together, they are expected to form a special purpose vehicle company (referred to here as Nkhotakota Solar), which will develop, design, finance, construct and operate the power station. The power generated is expected to be purchased by the Malawian public electric utility company, Electricity Supply Corporation of Malawi (Escom), in accordance with a 20-year power purchase agreement.

Starting with installed capacity of 21 megawatts, the power station, which will be built in phases is expected to be expanded to capacity of 37 megawatts in the second phase. It is estimated that Nkhotakota Solar Power Station will supply 7 gigawatt-hours (GWh) of energy annually, enough to supply 200,000 Malawian homes.

== Ownership ==
The table below illustrates the ownership of Nkhotakota Solar Power Station and of Nkhotakota Solar, the special purpose vehicle company that operates the power station.

Nkhotakota Solar stock ownership
Rank	Name of owner	Domicile
1	Phanes Group	Dubai, United Arab Emirates
2	Serengeti Energy Limited (formerly rAREH)	Nairobi, Kenya

== Funding ==
The cost of construction is reported to be US$40 million. Lenders, donors and guarantors to the project include:

- U.S. International Development Finance Corporation (DFC)
- Africa Trade Insurance Agency (ATI).

== See also ==
- List of power stations in Malawi
