= Nanjoka Solar Power Station =

Solar farm in Malawi

- Country: Malawi
- Location: Nanjoka, Salima District, Central Province
- Coordinates: 13°44′34″S 34°22′11″E
- Status: Under construction
- Construction began: November 2023
- Commission date: H2 2025 (expected)
- Construction cost: US$17 million
- Owner: Electricity Generation Company Malawi Limited (EGENCO)
- Operator: EGENCO

Solar farm
- Type: Flat-panel PV
- Site area: 110 hectares (270 acres)

Power generation
- Nameplate capacity: 10 megawatts (13,000 hp) (Phase 1); 20 megawatts (27,000 hp) (Phase 2); 50 megawatts (67,000 hp) (Phase 3)

Nanjoka Solar Power Station is a 10 megawatts (13,000 hp) solar power plant under construction in Malawi, in Southern Africa.

== Location ==
The power station is located in the neighborhood known as Nanjoka, in Salima District, in the Central Province of Malawi. The project sits on 110 hectares (270 acres), owned by Electricity Generation Company Malawi Limited (EGENCO), the country's electricity generation parastatal. The location of this solar farm is approximately 71 kilometres (44 mi), northeast of the county's capital city of Lilongwe.

== Overview ==
In 2019 AGENCO made public its intentions to build a 10 megawatts photo-voltaic solar-panel power station at Nanjoka, in Salima District in the Central Region of Malawi. The power generated here is intended to be fed into the national grid through the existing ESCOM Nanjoka Substation.

The design calls for a phased development, 10MW at a time, of a ground-mounted solar farm on a 110 hectares (270 acres) piece of property (capable of accommodating a 50MW installation). The planned capacity is 20MW, developed in two phases. In the first phase, a battery storage device with 2.5MWh will modulate the power delivery.

== Developers ==
The power station is under development by the Electricity Generation Company Malawi Limited (EGENCO), the national electricity generation parastatal company. EGENCO awarded the engineering, procurement and construction (EPC) contract to CHINT Electric, a privately owned Chinese electrical equipment manufacturer, distributor and EPC contractor.

== Construction budget and time table ==
The construction budget for the 10MW first phase was reported as US$17 million, sourced from within EGENCO's assets. Construction began in November 2023 and was expected to conclude in 2025.

== Other considerations ==
Nanjoka Solar Power Station is part of efforts to increase Malawi's installed capacity to 1,000 MW with 30 percent derived from other renewable sources other than hydropower.

== See also ==
- List of power stations in Malawi
- Kanzimbe Solar Power Station
