= Sucoma Airport =

- IATA: none; ICAO: FWSU

Summary
- Airport type: Public
- Serves: Nchalo
- Elevation AMSL: 225 ft (69 m)
- Coordinates: 16°16′05″S 34°52′35″E

Map
- Location of the airport in Malawi

Runways
Direction	Length		Surface
Direction	m	ft	Surface
15/33	800	2,620	Asphalt
- Sources: GCM Google Maps

Sucoma Airport (ICAO: FWSU) is an airport serving the Nchalo Sugar Estate and the town of Nchalo, Republic of Malawi. The runway marked length is 800 meters (2620 feet), but it has overruns totals 1190 meters (3900 feet).

== See also ==
- Transport in Malawi
- List of airports in Malawi
