= Crescent School, Rugby =

School in Rugby, Warwickshire, England

Coordinates: 52.3585°N 1.2869°W

Crescent School is a Private preparatory coeducational day School for pupils aged 3 – 11. It is in the Bilton area of Rugby, Warwickshire, England. It was informally started in 1946, and founded in 1948 as a school for the children of Rugby School masters. It was housed in Rugby School buildings. Having opened its doors to children living in Rugby and the surrounding district, it outgrew its premises and, in 1988, purchased a purpose-built school in Bilton, a residential suburb approximately 2 miles south of Rugby town centre.

There are 167 pupils, including children aged 3–4 in the Pathfinders nursery school. Since 2017, the school has been a part of the Princethorpe Foundation, alongside secondary school Princethorpe College, primary school Crackley Hall and nursery Little Crackers. The headmaster is Joe Thackway. The school is a member of Independent Association of Preparatory Schools and the school is a member of the Independent Schools Council, having undergone Independent Schools Inspectorate and Ofsted inspections.

In 2025 the school was given an eco-school award following projects undertaken by the pupils. The school has been supporting a twin school in Bwengu in northern Malawi since 2007 which is the site of a new solar farm.
