= Baomahun Hybrid Power Station =

Hybrid power station in Sierra Leone

- Country: Sierra Leone
- Location: Baomahun, Bo District, Southern Province
- Coordinates: 07°47′19″N 11°40′03″W
- Status: Proposed
- Construction began: H2 2024 Expected
- Commission date: December 2025 Expected
- Owner: CrossBoundary Energy
- Operator: CrossBoundary Energy

Solar farm
- Type: Flat-panel PV

Power generation
- Nameplate capacity: 58 megawatts (78,000 hp)

Baomahun Hybrid Power Station, is a hybrid power plant under development in Sierra Leone. The power station comprises: (a) a 23.8 MW (31,900 hp) solar power plant (b) a 13 MW/13.8 MWh battery storage power station (BESS) and (c) a 21 MW thermal power plant. The power station is owned and under development by CrossBoundary Energy, an independent power producer (IPP) based in Kenya. The off-taker in FG Gold Limited a mining company, domiciled in Sierra Leone and based in Freetown, the country's capital city. The power is intended for use in FG Gold's new Baomahun Gold Mine, in Baomahun. Sierra Leone.

== Location ==
The power station would be located on the premises of Baomahun Gold Mine, located on 124.27 square kilometres (47.98 mi^{2}) of real estate, just north of the town of Baomahun, Sierra Leone. Baomahun is located in Bo District in the country's Southern Province, approximately 285 kilometres (177 mi) east of Freetown, the capital and largest city in that country.

== Overview ==
FG Gold Limited is constructing a gold mine near Baomahun, Sierra Leone. The mine is expected to yield 147,000 ounces per year, peaking at 234,000 ounces, over a 12.5-year mine life. The mine is expected to produce 5.81 million ounces over its lifespan. It is projected to be the country's largest gold mine.

To power the mine's operations, FG Gold Limited signed a 20-year power purchase agreement with CrossBoundary Energy to build this hybrid power plant under the build–own–operate–transfer (BOOT) arrangement.

== Construction timeline and costs ==
The gold mine and the hybrid power station are expected to commence construction in 2024 and reach commercial commissioning in 2025. All the construction costs for the power station are to be incurred by CrossBoundary Energy.

== See also ==
- List of power stations in Sierra Leone
