= Golomoti Solar Power Station =

Solar park in Malawi

- Country: Malawi
- Location: Golomoti, Dedza District, Central Region
- Coordinates: 14°25′41″S 34°36′16″E
- Status: Operational
- Construction began: Q1 2021
- Commission date: Q2 2022

Solar farm
- Type: Flat-panel PV

Power generation
- Nameplate capacity: 20 MW (27,000 hp)

The Golomoti Solar Power Station is a 20 MW (27,000 hp) solar power plant in Malawi. The power station was developed by a consortium comprising InfraCo Africa of the United Kingdom and JCM Power, a Canadian independent power producer. Construction began during the first quarter of 2021. The solar farm came online during the second quarter of 2022.

== Location ==
The power station is located in the settlement of Golomoti, in Dedza District, in the Central Region of Malawi. Golomoti is located approximately 47 kilometres (29 mi), by road, southeast of Dedza, the district capital. This is approximately 137.5 kilometres (85 mi) by road southeast of Lilongwe, the regional headquarters and national capital city.

== Overview ==
The power station has a 20 megawatt capacity. Its output is to be sold directly to the Electricity Supply Corporation of Malawi (ESCOM), under a long-term power purchase agreement. The power will be integrated into the Malawian national electricity grid via a 132kV high voltage transmission line, starting at a substation at the power station.

The design calls for a battery energy storage system with capacity of 5 MW/10 MWh. The storage system allows for energy to be stored and released on cloudy days and at night, when there is no sun. Also, during the dry season, when rivers are low, the stored energy balances the national grid, when the hydroelectric component falls. The Chinese company Sungrow Power Supply, won the contact to supply and install a PV inverter, an MV station, a power conversion system, a battery container, and an energy management system (EMS).

== Developers ==
The power station was developed by InfraCo Africa, a subsidiary of UK-based Private Infrastructure Development Group (PIDG), in partnership with JCM Power (JCM), an IPP based in Toronto, Canada. InfraCo maintains a 25 percent stake in the project through equity financing.

The project also benefitted from a £2.1 million grant from the government of the United Kingdom, for the purpose of purchasing lithium storage batteries, for use in the Battery Energy Storage System (BESS).

In December 2021, Afrik21.africa reported that Golomoti Solar had benefited from a "liquidity guarantee", provided by Africa Trade Insurance Agency (ATI). The project also received support from Innovate UK, an agency of the government of the UK.

In September 2022, JCM Power, the Canadian IPP with 75 percent ownership in this power station, closed on a loan worth US$25 million from the U.S. International Development Finance Corporation (DFC), to retire some of the construction funding of the solar farm.

== See also ==
- List of power stations in Malawi
