= Kapachira Falls =

Waterfall in Malawi

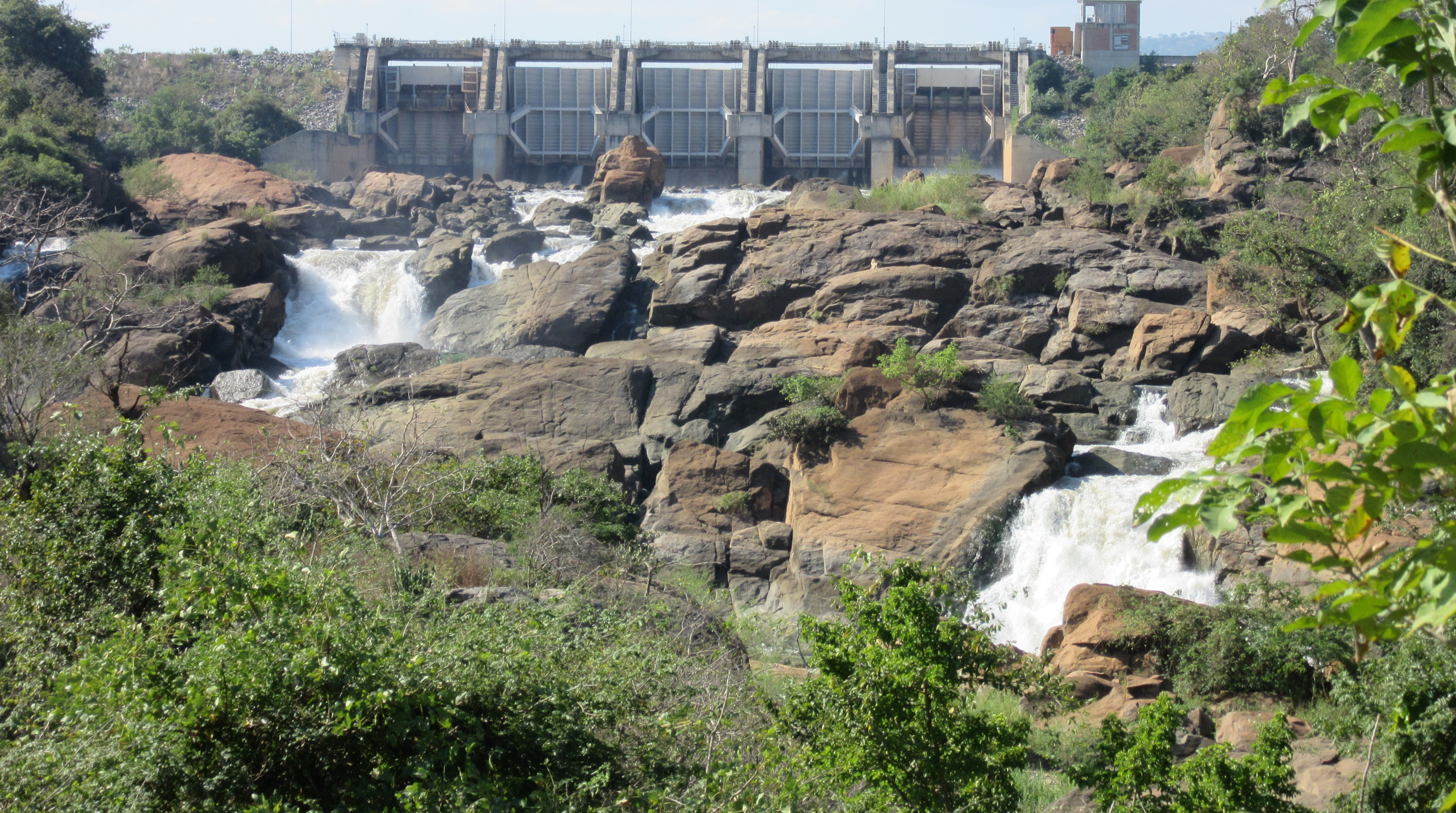
- Kapachira Falls including the Kapichira Hydroelectric Power Station
- Interactive map of Kapachira Falls
- Location: Malawi
- Coordinates: 15.900584°S 34.750868°E
- Watercourse: Shire River

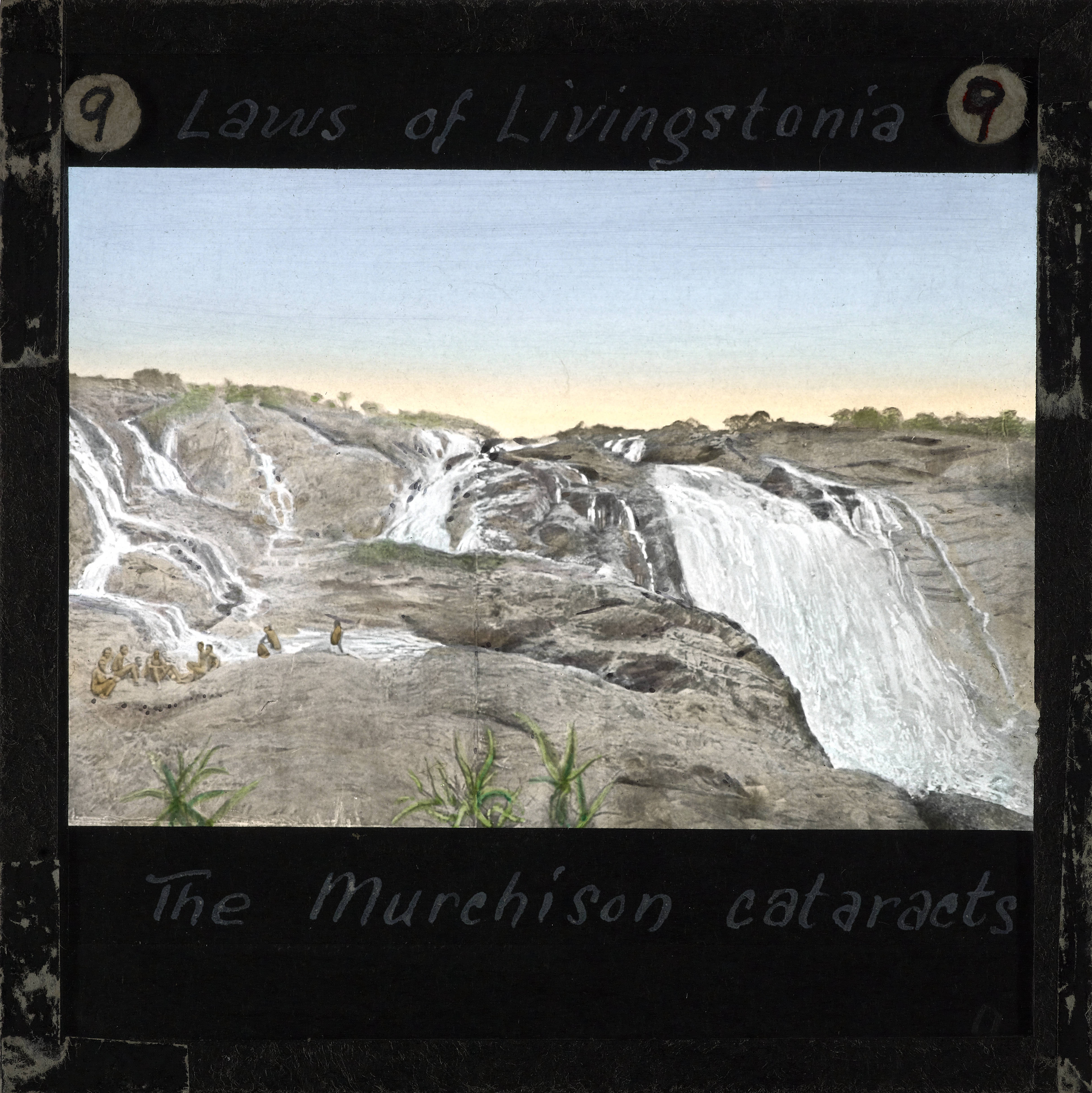
The Murchison Cataracts, lantern slide about the missionary Robert Laws

Kapachira Falls is a waterfall in Malawi. It is located on the lower Shire River near the town of Chikwawa and the Majete Wildlife Reserve. The Kapichira Hydroelectric Power Station was constructed above the falls to generate hydroelectricity.

During his 1859 Zambezi Expedition, David Livingstone named them the Murchison Cataracts after the geologist Sir Roderick Murchison. His river steamer Ma Robert could not pass them to get further up the Shire; several members of the expedition died from disease and are buried in the area.
