= Rosemary Mkandawire =

- Occupations: Businesswoman and politician
- Known for: CEO of Toyota Malawi and Power Market Limited (PML)
- Political party: Democratic Progressive Party

Rosemary Mkandawire is a Malawian businessperson and politician. She was the CEO of Toyota Malawi and Power Market Limited (PML)

== Life ==
Mkandawire was the managing director of Toyota Malawi. She was replaced by Arvinder Reel in October 2014 and she moved to a non-executive role.

In 2014 President Peter Mutharika appointed her to the board of the Public Private Partnership Commission.

Mkandawire was a member of the (ruling) Democratic Progressive Party when she took part in the primaries at Mzimba North constituency. She successfully beat Bruce Munthali to be the DPP's candidate and she then offered a large K6.5m prize for a football contest competed for by teams from her prospective constituency. The teams were Luzi, Bwengu, Luhomero, Enukweni, Engucwini, Ezondweni, Kacheche, Kamwe and Elunyeni.

Mkandawire became the CEO of another company called Power Market Limited.

In 2022 she successfully persuaded Judge William Yakuwawa Msiska, to stay an inquiry by the Ombudsman Grace Malera into PML. Malera was investigating how the senior employees of PML were appointed, but the inquiry was delayed because Mkandawire said that she had not had an opportunity to address the allegations.
