= Baoma Solar Power Station =

Solar farm in Sierra Leone

- Country: Sierra Leone
- Location: Yamandu, Southern Province
- Coordinates: 08°11′08″N 11°47′55″W
- Status: Operational
- Commission date: December 2022 (Phase I: 5 MW); December 2023 (Phase II: 20 MW) Expected
- Construction cost: US$35 million
- Owner: Baoma Solar Consortium
- Operator: Serengeti Energy Limited

Solar farm
- Type: Flat-panel PV

Power generation
- Nameplate capacity: 25 megawatts (34,000 hp)

Baoma Solar Power Station, is a 25 megawatts (34,000 hp) solar power plant under construction in Sierra Leone. The first phase of this renewable energy infrastructure with generation capacity of 5 MW is operational and was commercially commissioned in December 2022. The second phase with generation capacity of 20 MW is under construction and is expected to come online in the Q4 of 2023. It is reported to be the first grid-connected solar farm in the country, built under a public-private partnership.

== Location ==
The power station is located in the village of Yamandu, in the Southern Province of the country, near the city of Bo. (This location is different from Yamandu, a town in the Eastern Province of Sierra Leone).

Yamandu in Sierra Leone's Southern Province is approximately 45 kilometres (28 mi) by road, northwest of Bo City. This is approximately 240 kilometres (149 mi), by road southeast of Freetown, the country's capital.

== Overview ==
The power station design calls for generation capacity of 25 megawatts. The solar farm was constructed in two phases. Phase 1, also referred to as Baoma 1 Solar Power Station (Baoma 1), with capacity of 5 MW was commercially commissioned in December 2022. The second phase with generation capacity of 20MW is under construction and is expected online in 2023, to increase capacity to 25 megawatts. The output of this solar farm is sold directly to the Electricity Distribution and Supply Authority (EDSA), the national electricity distribution utility company, for integration into the national grid.

== Developers ==
The power station was developed and is operated by Serengeti Energy Limited, an independent power producer (IPP) headquartered in Nairobi, Kenya that focuses on sub-Saharan Africa. Collaboration with Sierra Leone authorities was instrumental in achieving completion.

== Construction timeline and costs ==
The first phase reached commercial commissioning in 2022. The second and final phase is expected online in or after 2023. The entire constructing is expected to cost US$35 million.

== See also ==
- List of power stations in Sierra Leone
