= Mpingwe =

- Town
- Location in Malawi
- Coordinates: 15°49′0″S 35°4′0″E
- Country: Malawi
- Region: Southern Region
- District: Blantyre District
- Time zone: +2
- Climate: Cwa

Mpingwe is a town located in Southern Malawi, situated between Mpingwe Hill and Bangwe Hill.

The town has inspired the London Based Last Man Stands team Mpingwe MAUK.
