= Songwe Hydroelectric Power Station =

Power station in Africa

- Map of Tanzania showing the location of Songwe Hydroelectric Power Station Songwe Hydroelectric Power Station (Africa) Songwe Hydroelectric Power Station (Earth)
- Country: Tanzania
- Coordinates: 09°27′11″S 33°05′47″E
- Purpose: Power
- Status: Proposed
- Owner: Joint Songwe River Basin Commission

Dam and spillways
- Impounds: Songwe River

Power Station
- Commission date: 2022 (expected)
- Type: Reservoir
- Installed capacity: 180 MW (240,000 hp)
- Website; Tanesco website

Songwe Hydroelectric Power Station, also Songwe Power Station, is a proposed hydropower plant, with planned capacity installation of 180 megawatts (240,000 hp) when completed. Other related developments include the development of more dams for both power generation and irrigation purposes, and the creation of a Joint River Basin Authority.

== Location ==
The power station would be located on the Songwe River, straddling the common border between Tanzania and Malawi. Its location is south of the town of Itumba, approximately 115 kilometres (71 mi), south of Mbeya, the headquarters of Mbeya District.

== Overview ==
This power station is the first to be developed by the Joint Songwe River Basin Commission, co-owned by the Government of Tanzania and the Government of Malawi. The power station design calls for the creation of a reservoir, to be used for power generation and irrigation purposes in both countries.

As of May 2017, the feasibility studies and environmental and social impact assessment (ESIA) had been completed. The final design had been agreed upon. Commitment of funding from potential investors was being sought.

== Construction ==
The African Development Bank (AfDB) funded the feasibility and design studies. The final design report was expected at the end of 2015. Other administrative and funding matters were expected to conclude in 2016. Construction was expected to start after that and conclude in 2022. Each country will be allocated 90 megawatts (120,000 hp) from this project.

The total cost of the project is quoted at US$829 million, to be shared equally by the two countries. The AfDB has expressed willingness to fund this project.

== See also ==
- List of power stations in Tanzania
- List of power stations in Malawi
- List of hydropower stations in Africa
- List of hydroelectric power stations
