= Majete Wildlife Reserve =

Wildlife reserve in Malawi

- IUCN category IV (habitat/species management area)
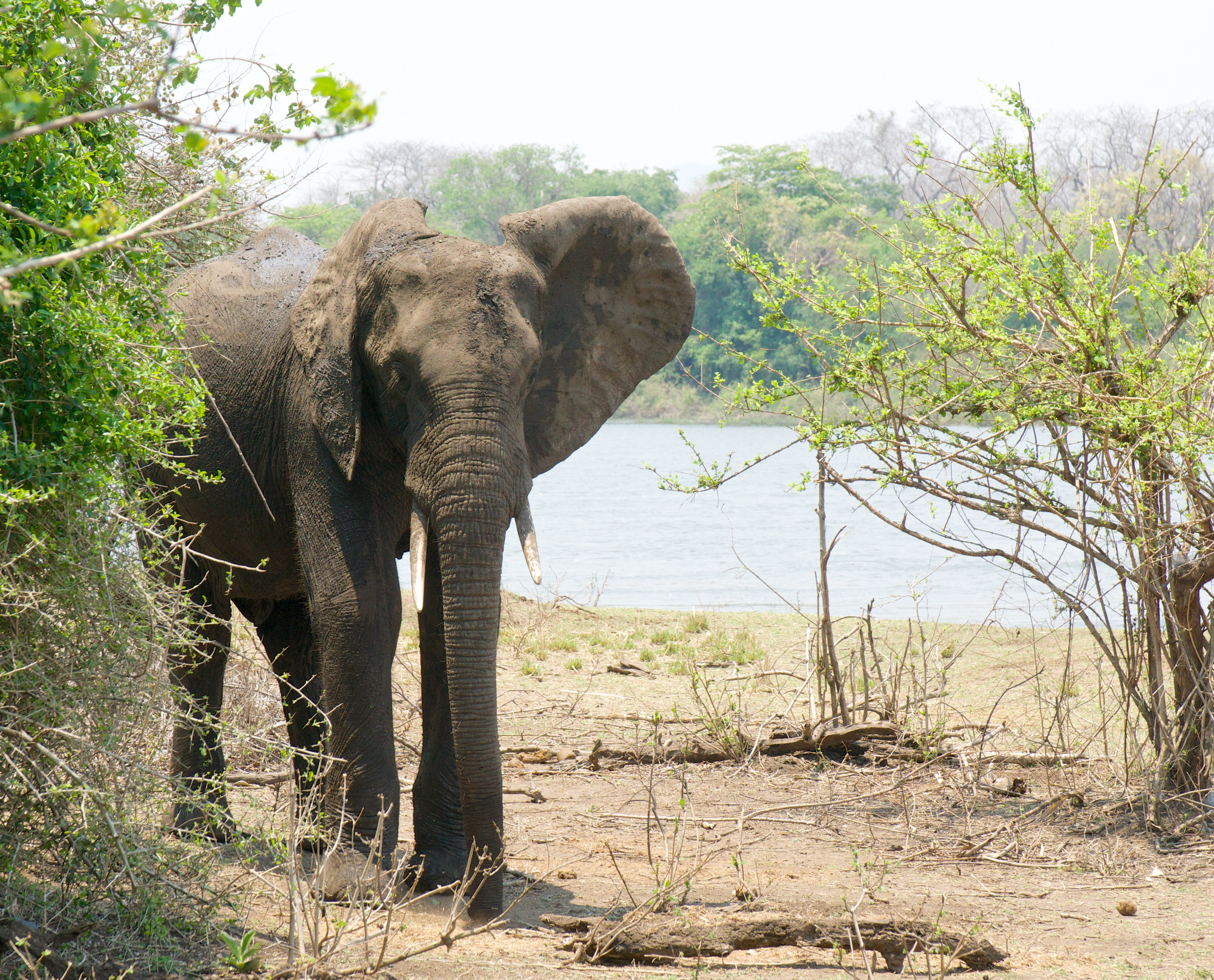
- Elephant at Majete Wildlife Reserve, October 2014

- Location within Malawi
- Location: Malawi
- Coordinates: 15°58′12″S 34°45′35″E
- Area: 270 sq mi (700 km^{2})

Majete Wildlife Reserve is a nature reserve in southwestern Malawi, established as a protected area in 1955. The reserve's animal populations were decimated during the late 1970s and 1980s due to poaching and other human activities. Majete has been managed by African Parks since 2003, when the nonprofit conservation organization entered into a public–private partnership with the Malawi Department of National Parks and Wildlife (DNPW). Since then, wildlife has been restored, the park has achieved Big Five game status, and tourism has increased.

== Description and geography ==
Majete Wildlife Reserve is a 270-square-mile (700 km^{2}) protected area in the lower Shire River valley, near Blantyre (Malawi's second largest city) and the Kapachira Falls. Majete's entrance includes a heritage centre, which displays confiscated trapping devices for capturing buffalo and other animals, and homemade muzzleloaders retrieved from poachers. 30 square miles (78 km^{2}) of the park's core sanctuary area are reserved for visitors participating in safaris.

== History ==
Majete has served as a nature reserve since 1955, but reportedly "was a wildlife sanctuary in name only" by 2002. During the late 1970s and 1980s, charcoal burning, logging, and poaching decimated the area's wildlife, leaving few game other than antelope. African Parks entered into a 25-year public–private partnership with the Malawi Department of National Parks and Wildlife (DNPW) in March 2003.

By 2013, the park's 142-kilometre (88 mi) perimeter was fenced, 24-hour patrolling was established, infrastructure were improved, and community programs were created to support local residents. Additionally, 300 kilometres (190 mi) of dirt roads were added, and the reserve established a lodge called Thawale, an education and visitor centre, and a campsite operated by locals. Majete's 12 rangers have increased to 140 full-time employees, and, as of 2022, no elephants or rhinos had been poached in the park since these improvements were made in 2003.

== Flora and fauna ==
The nature reserve features savanna and woodland ecosystems, including riparian forest. Plants in Majete include Acacia, Brachystegia, Sterculia, and tall grasses.

The park has more than 12,000 animals, as of 2022. Majete became Malawi's first Big Five game reserve (referring to African buffalo, African elephants, African leopards, lions, and rhinoceros) when the nonprofit conservation organization African Parks reintroduced lions in August 2012. Other mammals in the park include common eland, duiker, hippopotamus, impala, monkeys, nyala, reedbuck, sable and other antelopes, warthogs, waterbuck, and zebras. Reptiles include crocodiles and tortoises. Birds include the African finfoot, Böhm's bee-eater, Egyptian goose, and racket-tailed roller, as well as others in the order Anseriformes. Recorded arachnid species include the golden silk orb-weaver.

Poaching had eliminated the park's rhinoceros population during the 1970s, and the last of Majete's 300-strong elephant population was killed in 1992. In the 2000s, conservation efforts were implemented to restore animal populations. Black rhinos returned to Majete in 2003. African Parks relocated 70 elephants from Liwonde National Park and Mangochi Forest Reserve to a 140-square-kilometre (54 sq mi) fenced sanctuary within Majete in mid-2006. More elephants were relocated in 2008 and 2009. In 2012, two male and two female lions were translocated from South Africa, but one female died during the relocation. In 2018, four additional lions were brought in to increase the genetic diversity of the reserve's population. There were 52 lions in Majete as of 2022. More than 2,000 animals were reintroduced to the park by 2013, costing approximately US$3 million (or £1.5m). During 2016–2017, African Parks relocated approximately 500 elephants from Liwonde National Park and Majete Wildlife Reserve to Nkhotakota Wildlife Reserve. This translocation was undertaken to repopulate and restore Nkhotakota as a secure elephant sanctuary, and to relieve pressure on habitats in Majete and Liwonde from the surplus of elephants in those parks. There were reportedly 400 elephants in Majete in mid-2017. In 2018, 13 giraffes were translocated from South Africa and Nyala Park to the reserve, followed by ten more in 2021. In 2019, five cheetahs were also reintroduced, decades after their absence. One year later, Majete saw the historic return of the African wild dog, when a pack of six individuals was reintroduced to the park from South Africa and Mozambique.

== Tourism ==
Tourism in Majete has increased as animal populations were restored, and especially after the park achieved big five game status following the reintroduction of lions in 2012. Majete reportedly received almost no tourists during the early 2000s. This increased to 315 visitors in 2006, and more than 4,500 guests by 2011. Mkulumadzi, a luxury lodge along the Shire River operated by Robin Pope Safaris, opened in mid 2011 and features eight riverside bush chalets, as of 2013. The Maravi Post reported there were approximately 7,000 tourists in 2016, contributing $400,000 in gross revenue which supports the park's conservation efforts and management. Local communities also benefit from the funds, which have been used to construct a malaria research and prevention centre in Majete, support beekeeping projects, and provide scholarships to students, among other activities and programs.
