= Mzimba North Constituency =

Malawian electoral constituency

- First-past-the-post constituency for the Parliament of Malawi
- District: Mzimba
- Region: Northern Region

Current constituency
- Party: UTM
- Member: Catherine Mzumara

Mzimba North Constituency is a constituency for the National Assembly of Malawi, located in the Mzimba District of Malawi's Northern Region. It is one of 12 constituencies in Mzimba District that elects one Member of Parliament by the first past the post system. The constituency has 12 wards, all electing councillors for the Mzimba District.

Football teams in the Mzimba North constituency (e.g. Enukweni) competed for a large K6.5m prize offered by Rosemary Mkandawire in 2018. Mkandawire was a former CEO of Toyota Malawi and a prospective parliamentary candidate. The constituency was represented by Malawi Congress Party MP, Yolamu Ngwira until 2025.

In 2025 prospective UTM candidate, Catherine Mzumara, announced a 15 million Kwacha football tournament to run over several months accompanied by talks and traditional dancing. Catherine Mzumara was elected.

== Members of parliament ==
| Elections | MP | Party | Notes | References |
|---|---|---|---|---|
| 2004, 2014 | Agnes NyaLonje | UTM | Multi-party system | |
| 2019 | Yolamu Ngwira | MCP | Multi-party system | |
| 2025 | Catherine Mzumara | UTM | Multi-party system | |
