= Catherine Mzumara =

Malawian politician

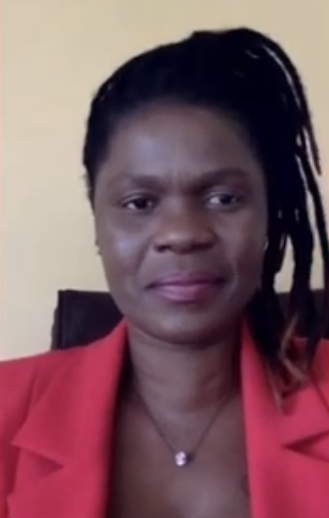
- In a 2022 panel discussion
- Education: Peking University
- Occupation: Member of the National Assembly
- Known for: MP
- Predecessor: Yolamu Ngwira
- Successor: incumbent in 2025
- Political party: United Transformation Movement

Catherine Mzumara is a Malawian politician and a member of parliament from the 2025 election. She is a member of the United Transformation Movement and she represents the Mzimba North Constituency.

== Life ==
Mzumara is a member of the United Transformation Movement and she was elected as the vice president for Northern Malawi.

Mzumara completed her doctorate at Peking University in June 2025. Her thesis, Political Competition and Economic Progress: A Comprehensive Analysis of Malawi’s Development Path, concerned the political direction of her country. She reported that her research revealed that poor leadership was the main cause of Malawi's poor economy. She was said to be one of the few women politicians with such a high qualification.

She was her party's candidate in the Mzimba North Constituency in the 2025 election. The constituency was represented by Malawi Congress Party MP, Yolamu Ngwira. Mzumara addressed crowds in March playing back recordings of President Lazarus Chakwera making promises to the north. She made the point that they want your votes but "they" soon forget once elected. She later announced a 15 million kwacha football tournament to run over several months accompanied by other events including talks and traditional dancing. The first event was in July at Thumbi Primary School. Also in July there was a public call for Mzumara to be chosen as the UTM's vice-Presidential candidate. An ad-hoc group proposed that she would add gender and regional balance to the UTM ticket.

She reclaimed the constituency for the United Transformation Movement in the election. She was an exception to a poor showing by her party.
