= Serengeti Energy Limited =

Kenyan independent power producer

- Company type: Private
- Industry: Electric power generation
- Founded: 2013; 13 years ago
- Headquarters: 4th Floor, ABC Towers, Waiyaki Way, Nairobi, Kenya
- Number of locations: 4 Regional Offices: Cape Town, South Africa; Dakar, Senegal; Freetown, Sierra Leone; Lilongwe, Malawi
- Key people: Anton-Louis Olivier - CEO
- Products: Electricity
- Website: www.serengeti.energy

Serengeti Energy Limited, formerly called responsAbility Renewable Energy Holding (rAREH), is an independent power producer (IPP) company Headquartered in Nairobi, Kenya, with investments in sub-Saharan Africa. Serengeti Energy specializes in renewable energy sources (primarily hydro and solar and now scaling into wind technologies) of between 5 MW and 50 MW at various development stages including planning, financing, construction and operations. As of June 2024, the firm has 9 operational plants in 5 countries: 3 hydro-power plants in South Africa, 3 hydro-power plants in Uganda, 1 hydro-power plant in Rwanda, 1 solar-power plant in Malawi and Sierra Leone's first grid connected solar-power plant in Bo District, with a total operational capacity of 53MW. The company commissioned the 21MWp Nkhotakota Solar Power Station in Malawi, in March 2023.

== Location ==
The company headquarters are located Nairobi the capital city of Kenya. It maintains regional offices in Dakar Senegal, Cape Town South Africa, Lilongwe Malawi and Freetown Sierra Leone.

== Overview ==
Founded in 2013 with an ambitious mandate to create positive impact from activities in sub-Sahara Africa, Serengeti Energy develops, constructs, owns and operates small to medium-sized renewable energy power plants of up to 50MW at various stages of project life cycle with a particular focus on the development stage.

== Ownership ==
Serengeti Energy is owned by European DFIs including KfW, NDF, Norfund, STOA, Swedfund and Proparco. The company also collaborates with international investors, lenders, host governments and local utilities to generate reliable cost-effective renewable energy with minimal social and environmental impact.

== Power plants ==
The table below illustrates the stations owned at operated by Serengeti Energy.

List of Power Stations Owned and Operated By Serengeti Energy Limited
Rank	Power Station	Country	Capacity (MW)
1	Mpanga Hydro Power Plant	Uganda	18.0
2	Nyamwamba I Hydro Power Plant	Uganda	9.2
3	Nyamwamba II Hydro Power Plant	Uganda	7.8
4	Nkhotakota Solar Power Station	Malawi	21.0
5	Rwaza Hydro Power Plant	Rwanda	2.7
6	Merino Hydro Power Plant	South Africa	3.7
7	Sol Plaatje Hydro Power Plant	South Africa	2.3
8	Stortemelk Hydro Power Plant	South Africa	4.2
9	Baoma I Solar Power Plant	Sierra Leone	5.0

== See also ==
- List of power stations in Africa
