= Kammwamba Thermal Power Station =

Proposed power plant in Malawi

- Approximate location of Kammwamba Power Station
- Country: Malawi
- Location: Kammwamba, Zalewa, Neno District, Malawi
- Coordinates: 15°27′36″S 34°50′37″E
- Status: Planned
- Commission date: 2022 (expected)
- Owner: Electricity Generation Company Malawi Limited

Thermal power station
- Primary fuel: Coal-fired

Power generation
- Nameplate capacity: 300 MW (400,000 hp)

The Khammwamba Thermal Power Station, also Khammwamba Power Station, is a proposed coal-fired power plant in Malawi, with planned installed capacity of 300 megawatts (400,000 hp).

== Location ==
The power station would be located in the Kammwamba area in the town of Zalewa, in Neno District, in the Southern Region of Malawi, approximately 60 kilometres (37 mi), by road, north-west of the city of Blantyre.

== Overview and history ==
As of November 2016, Malawi had installed a capacity of 351 megawatts of electric power generation. Peak demand stood at 350 megawatts, leaving very little room for flexibility. This has exposed the Malawi grid to recurrent, crippling load shedding. It has also starved big industrial and manufacturing projects, especially in the areas of mining and processing, slowing national development and job creation.

As far back as 2013, the government of Malawi began engaging the China Gezhouba Group Company (CGGC), to design, build and operate a coal-fired electricity-generation power plant at Kammwamba, in Southern Malawi. The money needed for construction would be borrowed from the Export–Import Bank of China. At that time, it was expected that the coal would be sourced within Malawi, where coal reserves are estimated at 22,000,000,000 tons. In January 2014, the cost of the project was valued at US$295 million.

In May 2014, plans to build this power station were concretized. The new plans called for starting with a 300-megawatt development, expandable in the future to 1,000 megawatts. The primary source of the coal to fire the power station was identified as the Moatize coalfields in neighboring Mozambique. The imported coal would be hauled to the site via the nearby railway line.

The power generated at this station, would be relayed to a 400kV substation at Phombeya, in Balaka District, where it would be integrated into the Malawian national electricity grid.

== Ownership and financing ==
In September 2017, The Nation reported that the government of Malawi would own 85 percent of the power station, while CGGC of China would own 15 percent of the power station. Vale Logistics of Brazil would provide the coal needed, over a 30-year contract period. The challenge at that time was that the agreements called for the government to put down US$104 million in "commitment money". However, the government had only US$12.4 million available, and had requested to pay the balance in installments. Construction was expected to start in November 2018, with commissioning of the 300 megawatts plant expected in 2022.

== See also ==
- List of power stations in Malawi
- List of power stations in Africa
