= Second Zambezi expedition =

19th-century British exploration in Africa

- Part of the European Exploration of Africa
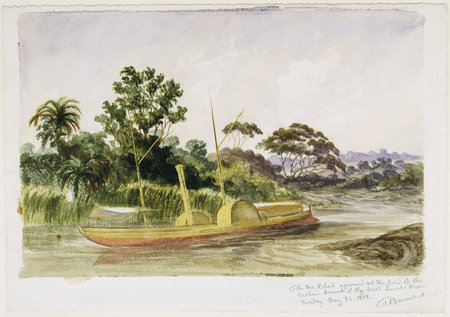
- The Ma Robert aground in the West Luabo River.
- Objective: Exploration of Southeast Africa
- Date: 1858–1864
- Executed by: United Kingdom
- Outcome: Successful expedition, establishment of the Central Africa Mission

The Second Zambezi expedition, from 1858 to 1864, was launched by the Royal Geographical Society of Britain to explore Southeast Africa for mineral deposits and other natural resources. The expedition led to the establishment of the Central Africa Mission and was under the command of Dr. David Livingstone, who would become famous for his journeys into the interior of Africa.

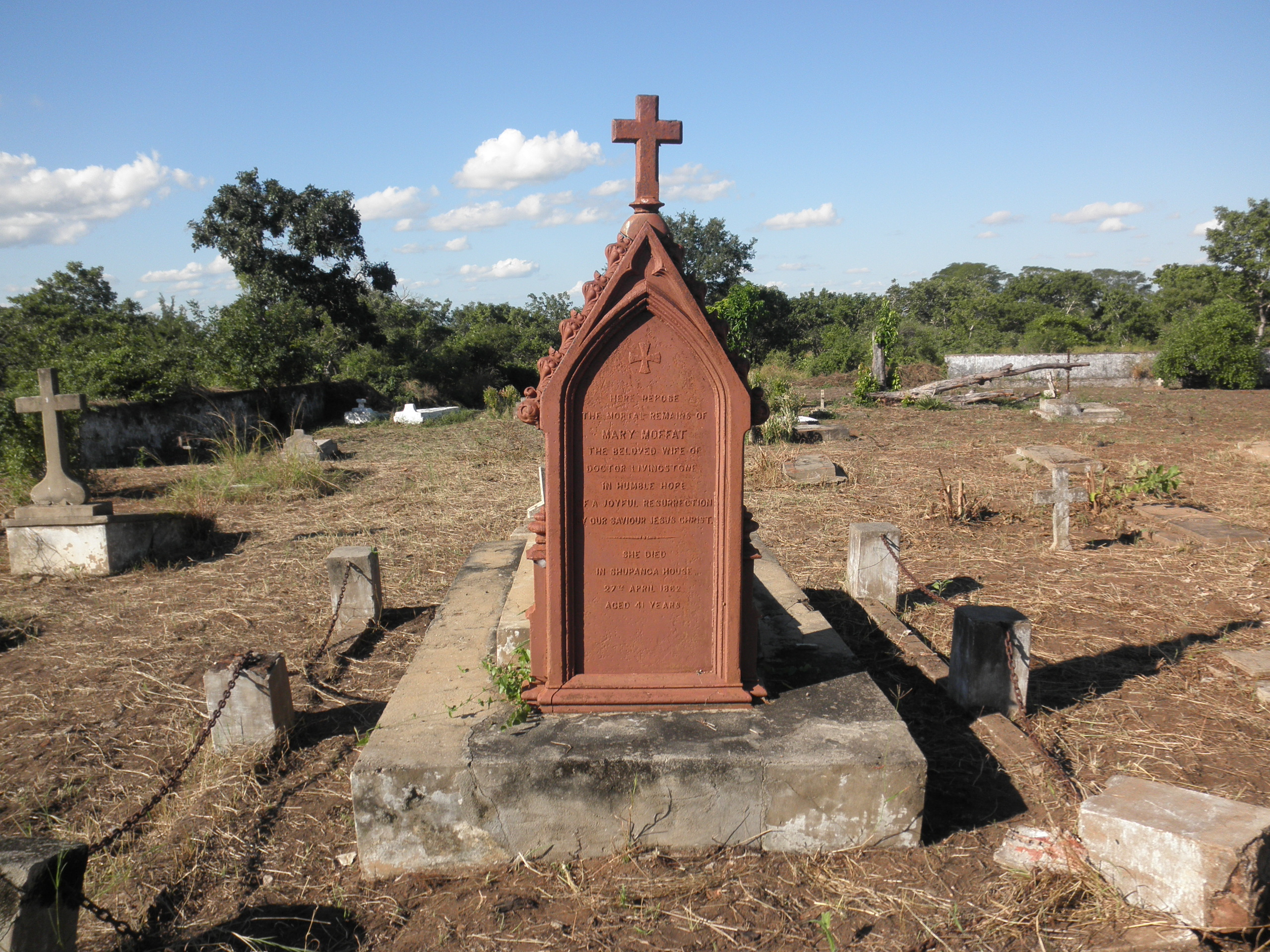
The burial site of Mary Moffat Livingstone in Chupanga, Mozambique
