= Lengwe National Park =

National park in Malawi

- IUCN category II (national park)
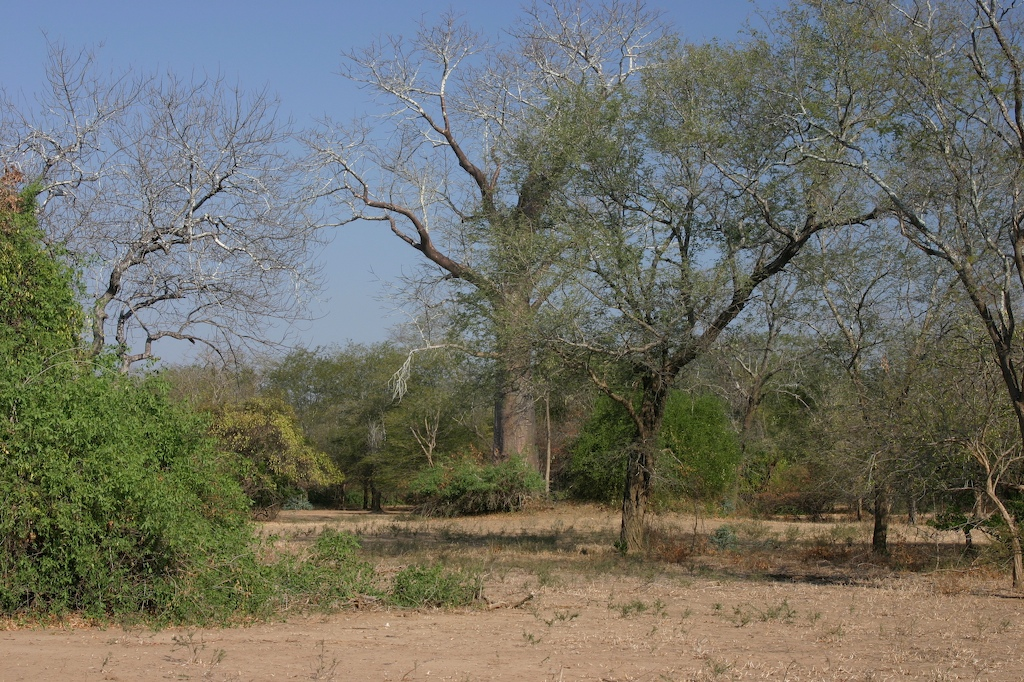

- Location within Malawi
- Location: Malawi
- Nearest city: Blantyre
- Coordinates: 16°15′28″S 34°45′05″E
- Area: 887 km^{2} (342 sq mi)
- Established: 1970
- Governing body: Department of National Parks

Lengwe National Park is a national park in Malawi located near the town of Chikwawa and about 40 miles (64 km) southwest of Blantyre. Lengwe's topography is unusual for Malawi and consists of open deciduous forests and dense thickets. It is the home of the reclusive Nyala antelope.

The climate of Lengwe is hot and dry, and rain is the only reliable source of water. Many man-made water holes have been constructed to attract and maintain the animal population. Jambo Africa Ltd operates Nyala Lodge for visitors. Animals that inhabit this park include giraffe, spotted hyena, leopard, warthog, kudu, impala, Samango monkey, reedbuck, Cape buffalo and suni. There is also a variety of birds, particularly shrikes, rollers, bee-eaters and the Yellow-spotted nicator.

== History ==
In 1928, Lengwe was established as a Game Reserve to protect the large mammals found in the Lower Shire Valley, especially the nyala antelope and its habitat. This protection is important as the Lower Shire Valley is the furthest north where nyala occur naturally. At that time, the protected area measured 520 square kilometres (200 sq mi). It was later reduced to 120 km^{2} (46 sq mi) in order to provide land for agriculture. This is what is now referred to as "Old Lengwe". This did not contain the year-round water supply to the animals that the Shire had provided. In 1964 and 1970, four artificial water holes were built throughout the area, and in 1970, Lengwe was given national park status.

In 1975, the extension area was added, increasing the size to 887 km^{2} (342 sq mi). Lengwe was expanded mainly to protect the catchment areas of the Shire, Mwanza, and Nkombedzi wa Fodya rivers. The extension also has the effect of protecting rock outcrops and increasing the dispersal area for wildlife. The park is managed by the Department of National Parks and Wildlife (DNPW).

In November 2016, 35 people were arrested for illegal logging in the park, having cut a road in from neighboring Mozambique.
