= ESCOM =

Higher School of Computing
- Escuela Superior de Cómputo
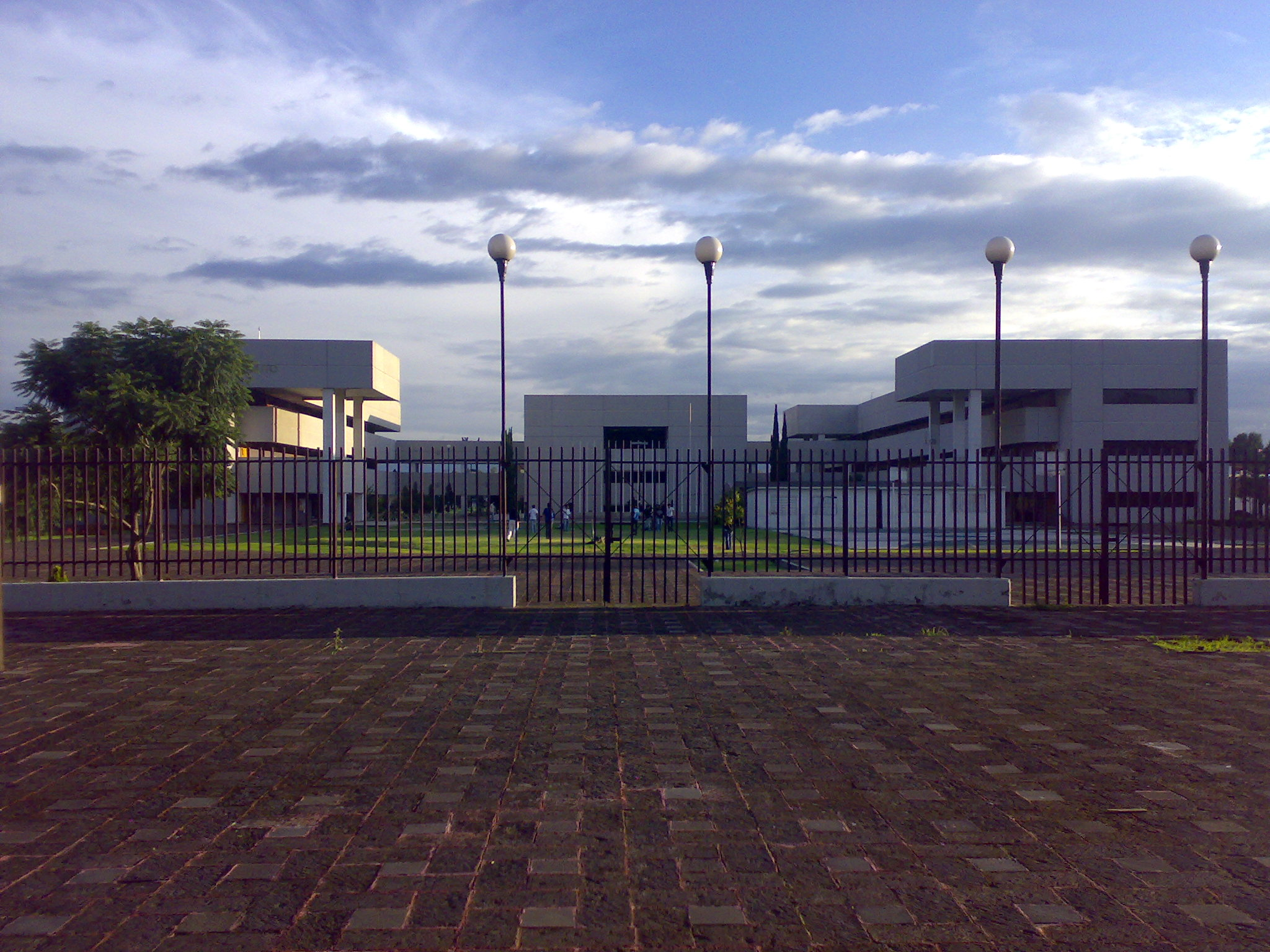
- ESCOM front view
- Type: Public
- Established: 27 September 1993
- Affiliations: ANFEI
- Dean: Ignacio Ríos de la Torre
- Director: Lic. Andrés Ortigoza Campos
- Students: Around 2,000
- Location: Mexico City, Mexico; 19°30′18″N 99°08′48″W
- Nickname: ESCOM
- Website: Official Site

The Higher School of Computing (in Spanish: Escuela Superior de Cómputo or ESCOM) is the college specialized in Computer Sciences of the National Polytechnic Institute located in Mexico City, Mexico. Its students pursue the bachelor's degree in computer engineering, artificial intelligence engineering and data science.

The school has a faculty mostly with postgraduate studies, and there is a growing number of teachers with doctoral studies.

== History ==
The school began classes on 27 September 1993 with 5 classrooms provided by the Superior School of Engineering and Architecture (ESIA) Zacatenco, on the third floor, building 10. Two of them worked as classrooms, one as a library, one as administrative area, and the other as school management. Similarly, the Superior School of Engineering and Architecture provided two spaces in the administrative area attached to the building 10, which were used as computer rooms.

From June 30, 2013, to July 4, 2013, the ESCOM participated for first time in the ACM ICPC World Finals. The team consisted of Christian Hernandez, Ethan Jimenez, and Jair Ramirez.

== Undergraduate courses ==
- First semester
  - Computing and Society
  - Programming I (Structured Programming)
  - Discrete Mathematics
  - Calculus I
  - Vector Analysis
  - Physics
- Second semester
  - Oral and Written Communication
  - Programming II (Numerical Analysis)
  - Differential Equations
  - Calculus II
  - Linear Algebra
  - Electric Circuits
- Third semester
  - Administrative Process
  - Programming III (Data Structures)
  - Software Engineering I
  - Digital Electronics
  - Probability and Statistics
  - Analog Electronics
- Fourth semester
  - Economics
  - Operating Systems I
  - Databases I
  - Introduction to Microprocessors and Microcontrollers
  - Software Engineering II
  - Digital Communications
- Fifth semester
  - Finance
  - Operating Systems II
  - Object Oriented Programming I
  - Databases II
  - Computer Networks I
  - Data Acquisitions
- Sixth semester
  - Project Generation and Evaluation
  - Visual Programming
  - Object Oriented Programming II
  - Artificial Intelligence
  - Computer Networks II
  - Compilers
- Seventh semester
  - Operations Research
  - Systems Development Techniques
  - Final Work I
  - Systems Programming I (Cryptography and Network Security I)
  - Advanced Programming I (Mobile Application Development I)
  - Developing of Web Applications I
- Eighth semester
  - Administration of Computer Centers
  - Final Work II
  - Systems Programming II (Cryptography and Network Security II)
  - Advanced Programming II (Mobile Application Development II)
