= Electricity Generation Company Malawi Limited =

Coordinates: 15°47′13″S 35°00′20″E

Electricity Generation Company Malawi Limited (Egenco)
- Company type: Parastatal
- Industry: Power generation
- Founded: 1 January 2017
- Products: Electricity
- Website: Homepage

The Electricity Generation Company Malawi Limited (Egenco) is a parastatal company whose primary purpose is to generate electric power for use in Malawi and for possible sale to neighboring countries. As of April 2018, Egenco's generation capacity was 351 megawatts (471,000 hp). In May 2021, Egenco's generation portfolio increased to 441.55 megawatts (592,130 hp) when the 19 MW Tedzani IV Hydroelectric Power Station was brought online.

== Location ==
The headquarters of Egenco are in Chayamba Building, at 7 Victoria Avenue, in the city of Blantyre, the financial capital and largest city in Malawi. The geographical coordinates of Egenco headquarters are: 15°47'13.0"S, 35°00'20.0"E (Latitude:-15.786944; Longitude:35.005556).

== Overview and history ==
Egenco was established when the Electricity Supply Commission of Malawi (ESCOM), hitherto the electricity monopoly in the country, was split, with Egenco assuming the role of electricity generation, and ESCOM retaining the roles of bulk purchase, transmission and distribution. Egenco became operational on 1 January 2017.

== Operations ==
Egenco is responsible for the operation, maintenance, and improvement of the power stations owned by the Malawian government. These include both hydroelectric and thermal power stations.

=== Operational stations ===
- Kapichira Hydroelectric Power Station: 128 megawatts
- Nkula A Hydroelectric Power Station: 24 megawatts
- Nkula A Hydroelectric Power Station: 100 megawatts
- Tedzani I Hydroelectric Power Station: 20 megawatts
- Tedzani II Hydroelectric Power Station: 20 megawatts
- Tedzani III Hydroelectric Power Station: 64 megawatts
- Tedzani IV Hydroelectric Power Station: 19.1 megawatts

=== Power stations in development ===
- Kammwamba Thermal Power Station: 300 megawatts

== Governance ==
Egenco is governed by a seven-person board of directors. As of January 2018, the following comprised the Egenco board.

- Lloyd Muhara: chairperson
- Patrick Matanda: member
- Stuart Ligomeka: member
- Mary Nkando: member
- Gloria Chawinga: member
- Arthur Mandambwe: member
- Noel Gama: member

== See also ==
- List of power stations in Uganda
- Electricity Regulatory Authority
- Energy in Uganda
