= Chikwawa District =

District of Malawi

Coordinates: 16°10′S 34°45′E

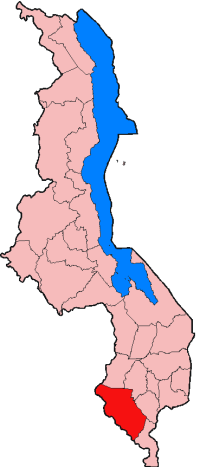
Location of Chikwawa District in Malawi

Chikwawa is a district in the Southern Region of Malawi. The capital is Chikwawa. The district covers an area of 4,755 km² and has a population of 356,682.

== Demographics ==
At the time of the 2018 Census of Malawi, the distribution of the population of Chikwawa District by ethnic group was as follows:

- 48.6% Sena
- 30.6% Mang'anja
- 7.4% Chewa
- 7.3% Lomwe
- 1.4% Ngoni
- 1.1% Yao
- 0.4% Tumbuka
- 0.3% Tonga
- 0.1% Nyanja
- 0.1% Nkhonde
- 0.0% Sukwa
- 0.0% Lambya
- 2.6% Others

== Government and administrative divisions ==
There are seven National Assembly constituencies in Chikwawa:

- Chikwawa - East
- Chikwawa - Central
- Chikwawa - Nkombezi
- Chikwawa - North
- Chikwawa - South
- Chikwawa - West
- Chikwawa - Central West

Central West is new and comprises the wards Nchalo and Lengwe.

At the 2009 general election all of these constituencies were represented by politicians from the Democratic Progressive Party.

In 2024 the MP for Chikwawa West Constituency was Susan Dossi.

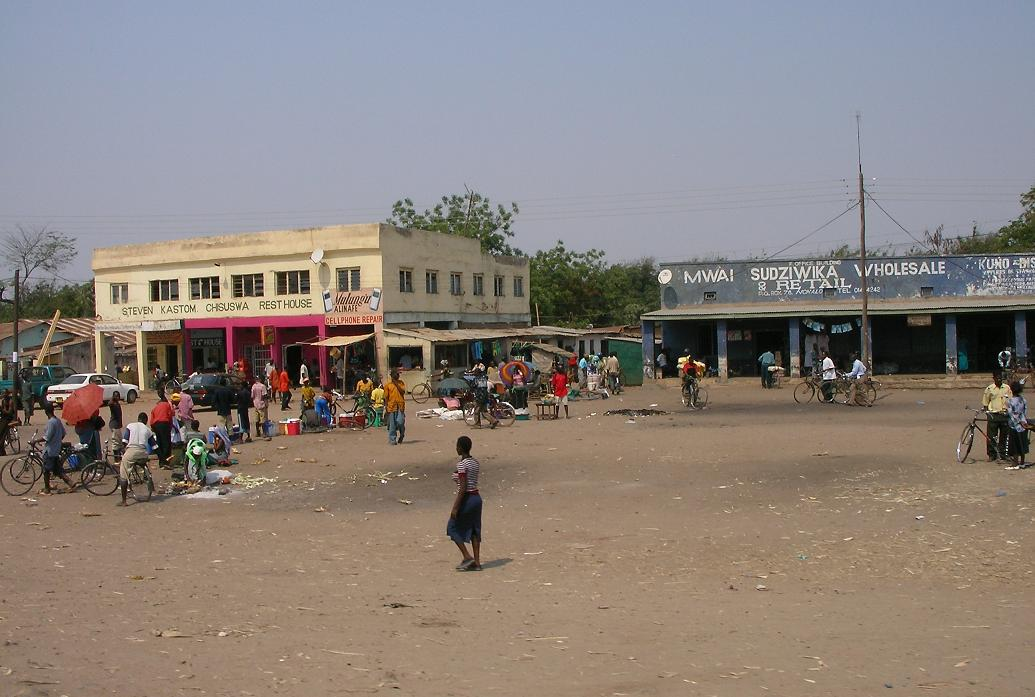
Town of Nchalo, south of Chikwawa
