= Electricity Supply Corporation of Malawi =

Malawian electricity distributor

Coordinates: 15°47′16″S 35°00′38″E

Electricity Supply Corporation of Malawi Limited (ESCOM)
- Type: Parastatal
- Industry: Electricity
- Founded: 1984; 42 years ago
- Headquarters: Blantyre, Malawi
- Key people: Kamkwamba Kumwenda; Chief Executive Officer
- Parent: Government of Malawi
- Website: www.escom.mw

Electricity Supply Corporation of Malawi Limited (ESCOM) is the state-owned power transmission and distribution company in Malawi. It is entirely in control of transmission and distribution of electric power in the country. ESCOM represents Malawi in the Southern African Power Pool. It should not be confused with its South African equivalent Eskom.

== Location ==
The headquarters of the company are located in ESCOM House, along Haile Selassie Avenue, in the central business district of Blantyre, the commercial and financial capital of Malawi. The ESCOM House sits directly across the street from Shifa Hospital. The geographical coordinates of the company headquarters are:15°47'16.0"S, 35°00'38.0"E (Latitude:-15.787778; Longitude:35.010556).

== Unbundling ==
When initially created in the 1980s, ESCOM monopolized the functions of (a) generation (b)transmission and (c) distribution of electric power throughout Malawi. In 2015, the government of Malawi began planning the unbundling of the company to allow private investors to enter the Malawian market.

Escom is saddled with low tariffs and payment arrears. The company is heavily indebted and is loss-making. It lacks creditworthiness and is unable to attract private investment into the electricity sector, because power-purchase agreements with Escom are not financially viable. It is unable to upgrade infrastructure and increase generation capacity.

In January 2017, Escom was split into two companies. Electricity Generation Company Malawi Limited (Egenco) is responsible for the operation, maintenance, and improvement of the power stations owned by the Malawian government. At that time, the power stations had generation capacity of 351 megawatts. Escom retained the role of bulk-purchaser, transmission and distribution to the consumer. Escom is also the sole seller to foreign customers.

== Governance ==
Thomson Mpinganjira served as the chairman of the ten-person board of directors in 2020. Mr. Kamkwamba Kumwenda is the Chief Executive Officer. He leads a team of nine senior Directors in running the day-to-day affairs of the company.

In November 2026, Jean Mathanga was the Energy minister. She was rejecting calls for her registration, because of the nationwide fuel supply crisis. She, like her predecessors, blamed the shortages on the lack of foreign exchange. Mathanga also blamed politically motivated ESCOM employees who she alleged were creating power cuts to assist unnamed politicians.

== See also ==
- List of power stations in Malawi
