= Southern Region, Malawi =

Region of Malawi

Southern Region Chigawo cha Kumwera (Chichewa) Chigaŵa cha Kummwela (Tumbuka)
- Region
- Southern Region in Malawi
- Coordinates: 15°40′S 34°58′E
- Country: Malawi
- Regional centre: Blantyre

Area
  - Total: 31,753 km^{2} (12,260 sq mi)

Population (2018 Census)
  - Total: 7,750,629
  - Density: 244.09/km^{2} (632.19/sq mi)

The Southern Region of Malawi is an area of Malawi. It covers an area of 31,753 km^{2}. Its capital city is Blantyre. In 2018, its population was 7,750,629.

== Geography ==
Domestically, the Southern Region borders the Central Region and Lake Malawi to the north. Internationally, it borders the country of Mozambique to the east, west, and south.

Of the 28 districts in Malawi, 13 are located within the Southern Region: Balaka, Blantyre, Chikwawa, Chiradzulu, Machinga, Mangochi, Mulanje, Mwanza, Neno, Nsanje, Phalombe, Thyolo, and Zomba.

The region is home to several parks: Majete Wildlife Reserve, Lengwe National Park, and Liwonde National Park (the last of these on the Shire River). It is also home to the Zomba Plateau as well as Mount Mulanje (the highest point in the country).

During July, the region sometimes experiences a damp fog, locally known as chiperoni.

== Demographics ==
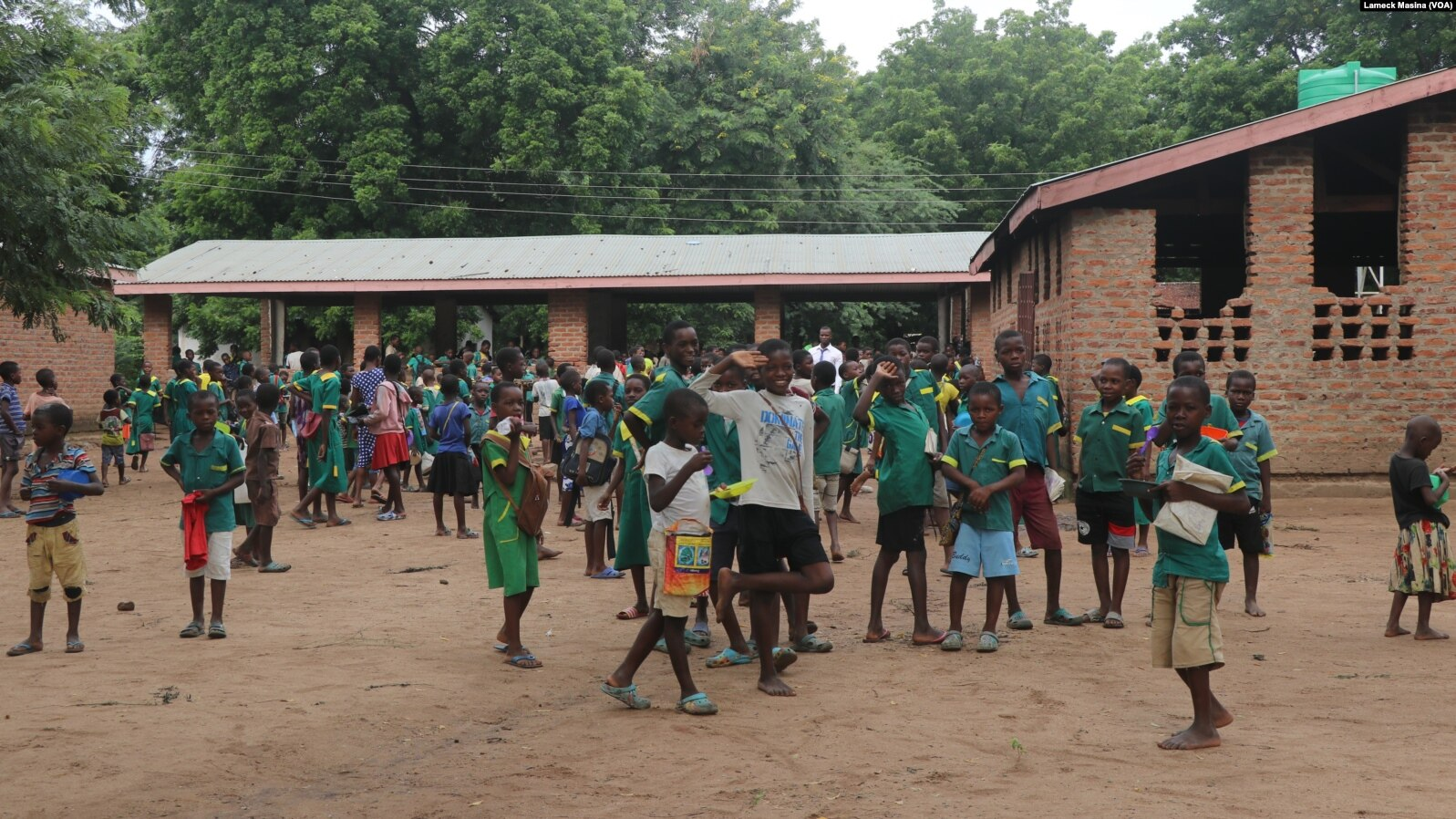
A crowd of children in 2024

The Southern Region is home to about half of all Malawians. Of these, about 90% of them live in rural areas.

As of 2003, the Southern Region has a slightly higher rate of poverty (68.1%) than the Central Region (62.8%) and the Northern Region (62.5%). This is due to migration into the region, as well as the region's relatively small cropland are per capita.

=== Ethnic groups ===
At the time of the 2018 Census of Malawi, the distribution of the population of the Southern Region by ethnic group was as follows:

- 39.3% Lomwe
- 24.9% Yao
- 8.3% Ngoni
- 8.2% Sena
- 6.8% Mang'anja
- 6.6% Chewa
- 3.8% Nyanja
- 0.9% Tumbuka
- 0.4% Tonga
- 0.1% Nkhonde
- 0.0% Lambya
- 0.0% Sukwa
- 0.7% Others

== Society ==
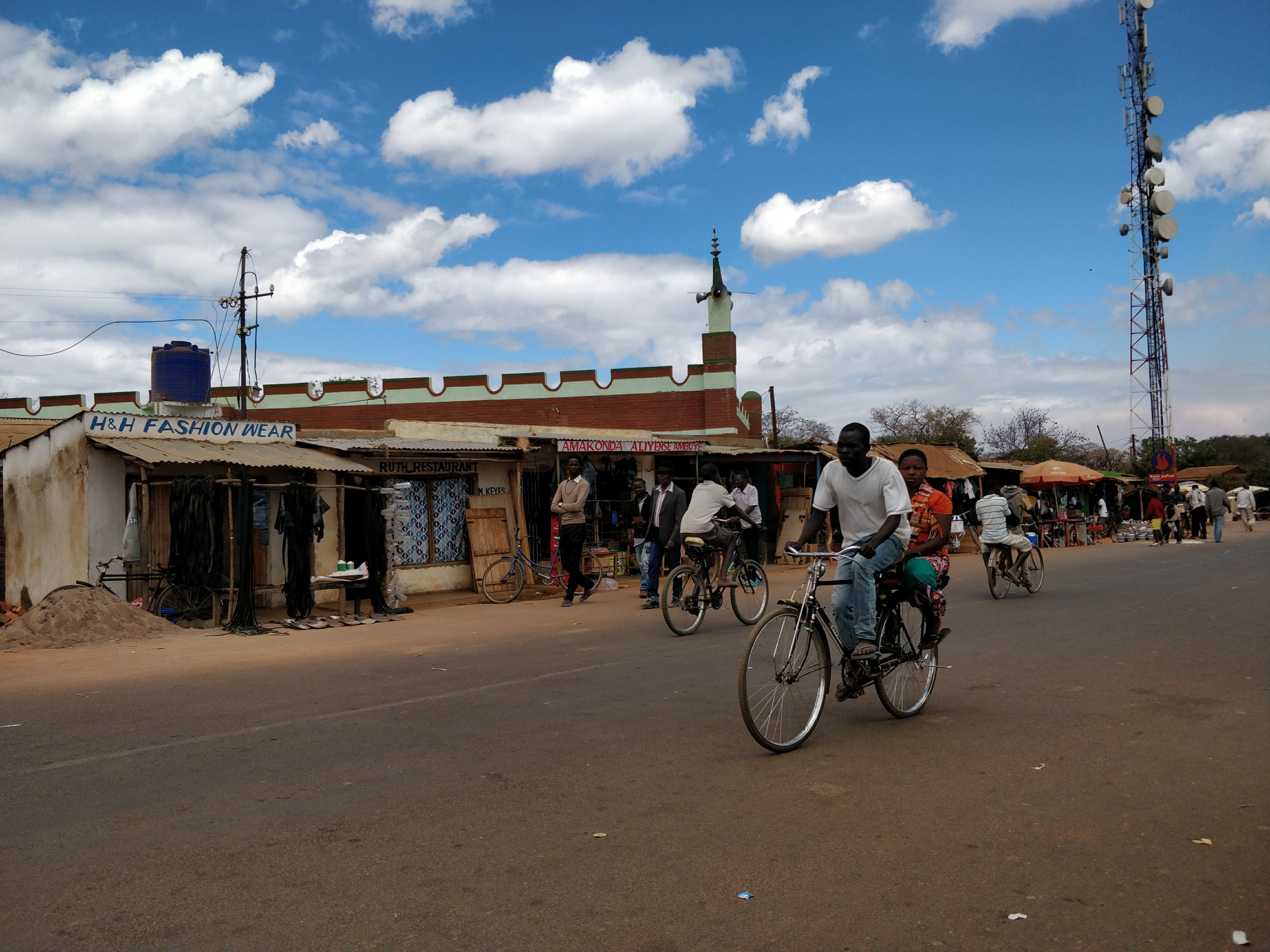
The village of Ntaja, in Machinga District, as seen in 2017

=== Economy ===
Cattle are quite important to the Southern Region as well as to Malawi as a whole. As of 1969, they made up about one third of the country's national slaughter, and the region had a population of about 78,998 cows.

=== Healthcare and disease ===
Kwashiorkor exists in the Southern Region at a prevalence of about 1.8% as of 1995. It is most common among babies aged between 1 and 1.5 years old, and often co-occurs with dysentery. Lymphatic filariasis and antigenaemia are also quite common, especially in the east.

Violence against nurses is quite common in the region, with about 70% of nurses reporting workplace violence as of 2016. Most abuse occurs in the form of verbal abuse and threatening behavior, with physical assault and sexual assault being less common. Patients make up the largest segment of perpetrators.
