= Shire River =

Shire River Shiré, Chire
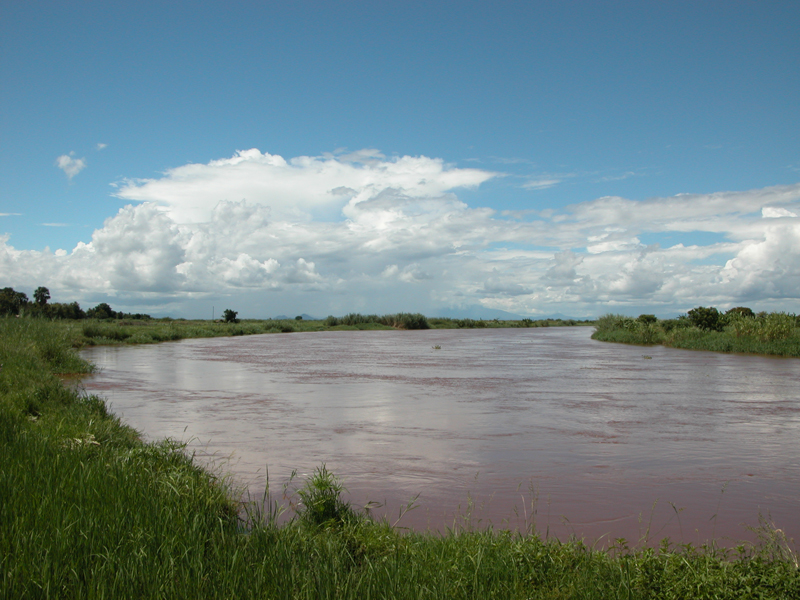
- The Shire near Nsanje, Malawi

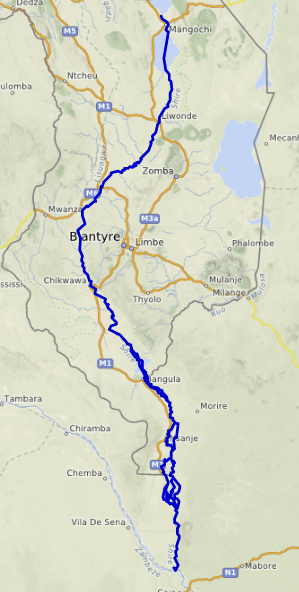
- Etymology: Chewa chiri, "steep banks"

Location
- Country: Malawi, Mozambique

Physical characteristics
- Source: Lake Malawi
  - coordinates: 14°25′25″S 35°14′10″E
  - elevation: 474 m (1,555 ft)
- Mouth: Zambezi
  - coordinates: 17°41′36″S 35°18′55″E
- Length: 402 km (250 mi)
- Discharge
  - average: 486 m3/s

The Shire (/ˈʃiːreɪ/, SHEE-ray) is the largest river in Malawi. It is the only outlet of Lake Malawi and flows into the Zambezi River in Mozambique. Its length is 402 kilometres (250 mi). The upper Shire River flows out of Lake Malawi and runs approximately 19 km (12 mi) before entering the shallow Lake Malombe. It then drains Lake Malombe and flows south through Liwonde National Park where large concentrations of hippopotamus are common along its banks. Between the towns of Matope and Chikwawa, the middle river drops approximately 400 m (1,300 ft) through a series of falls and gorges, including Kapachira Falls. Two hydroelectric dams have been built along the Shire northwest of Blantyre.

Beyond Chikwawa, the lower river turns southeast and enters the low-lying Mozambique plain. Its largest and one of its few perennial tributaries, the Ruo River, joins the Shire near the Malawian town of Chiromo. The muddy waters pass through a large stagnant area known as the Elephant Marsh before reaching the confluence with the Zambezi River south of the town of Sena, Mozambique.

In 1859, David Livingstone's Second Zambezi expedition traveled up the Shire river.

The river's valley is part of the East African Rift system.

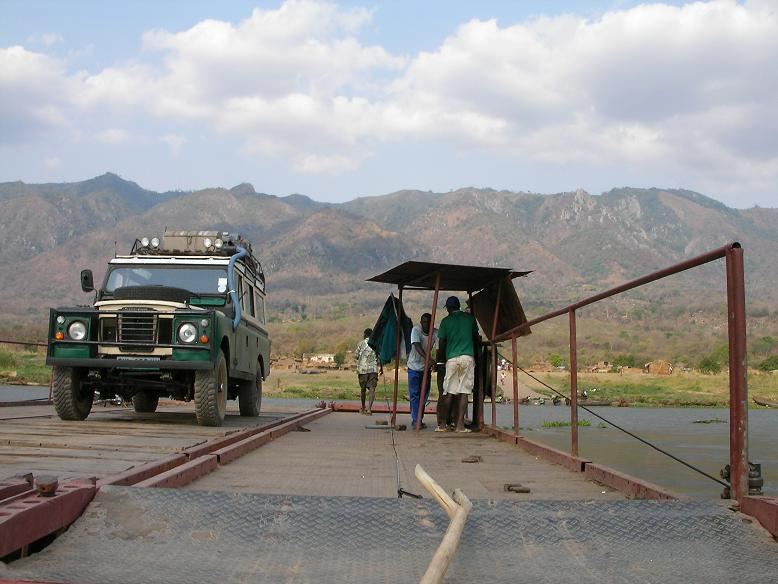
Ferry crossing the Shire in Mozambique
