= 2021 Africa Cup of Nations squads =

Squad list of 2021 Africa Cup of Nations national teams

The 2021 Africa Cup of Nations was an international football tournament that was held in Cameroon from 9 January to 6 February 2022. The 24 national teams involved in the tournament were allowed to register a squad of up to 28 players, including a minimum of three goalkeepers, to allow teams to deal with any COVID-19 cases. Only players in these squads were eligible to take part in the tournament.

The position and date of birth listed for each player is per the official squad list published by CAF. The age listed for each player is on 9 January 2022, the first day of the tournament. The numbers of caps and goals listed for each player do not include any matches played after the start of tournament. The club listed is the club for which the player last played a competitive match prior to the tournament. The nationality for each club reflects the national association (not the league) to which the club is affiliated. A flag is included for coaches that are of a different nationality than their own national team.

== Group A ==
=== Burkina Faso ===
Head coach: Kamou Malo

A 29-man provisional squad was announced on 24 December 2021. The final 28-man squad was named on 4 January 2022.

No.	Pos.	Player	Date of birth (age)	Caps	Goals	Club
1	GK	Aboubacar Sawadogo	10 August 1989 (aged 32)	17	0	(Burkinabé Football Federation) Kadiogo
2	FW	Djibril Ouattara	19 September 1999 (aged 22)	3	0	(Royal Moroccan Football Federation) OC Safi
3	DF	Oula Abass Traoré	29 September 1995 (aged 26)	7	0	(Guinean Football Federation) Horoya
4	DF	Soumaïla Ouattara	4 July 1995 (aged 26)	4	0	(Royal Moroccan Football Federation) Raja CA
5	DF	Patrick Malo	18 February 1992 (aged 29)	20	0	(Royal Moroccan Football Federation) Hassania Agadir
6	MF	Saïdou Simporé	31 August 1992 (aged 29)	8	1	(Egyptian Football Association) Al Ittihad
7	FW	Eric Traoré	21 May 1996 (aged 25)	10	1	(Egyptian Football Association) Pyramids
8	MF	Dramane Nikièma	17 October 1988 (aged 33)	6	0	(Guinean Football Federation) Horoya
9	DF	Issa Kaboré	12 May 2001 (aged 20)	15	1	(French Football Federation) Troyes
10	FW	Bertrand Traoré (captain)	6 September 1995 (aged 26)	59	12	(The Football Association) Aston Villa
11	FW	Mohamed Konaté	12 December 1997 (aged 24)	11	2	(Russian Football Union) Akhmat
12	DF	Edmond Tapsoba	2 February 1999 (aged 22)	16	0	(German Football Association) Bayer Leverkusen
13	DF	Hermann Nikiema	30 November 1988 (aged 33)	5	1	(Burkinabé Football Federation) Salitas
14	DF	Issoufou Dayo	6 August 1991 (aged 30)	53	5	(Royal Moroccan Football Federation) RS Berkane
15	FW	Abdoul Tapsoba	23 August 2001 (aged 20)	7	5	(Royal Belgian Football Association) Standard Liège
16	GK	Hervé Koffi	16 October 1996 (aged 25)	36	0	(Royal Belgian Football Association) Charleroi
17	FW	Zakaria Sanogo	11 December 1996 (aged 25)	19	0	(Football Federation of Armenia) Ararat-Armenia
18	MF	Ismahila Ouédraogo	5 November 1999 (aged 22)	10	0	(Hellenic Football Federation) PAOK
19	FW	Hassane Bandé	30 October 1998 (aged 23)	11	0	(Croatian Football Federation) Istra 1961
20	MF	Gustavo Sangaré	8 November 1996 (aged 25)	5	0	(French Football Federation) Quevilly-Rouen
21	FW	Cyrille Bayala	24 May 1996 (aged 25)	29	3	(French Football Federation) Ajaccio
22	MF	Blati Touré	4 August 1994 (aged 27)	20	0	(Swedish Football Association) Eskilstuna
23	GK	Farid Ouédraogo	26 December 1996 (aged 25)	2	0	(Burkinabé Football Federation) USFA
24	MF	Adama Guira	24 April 1988 (aged 33)	31	0	(Royal Spanish Football Federation) Racing Rioja
25	DF	Steeve Yago	16 December 1992 (aged 29)	55	0	(Cyprus Football Association) Aris Limassol
26	FW	Kouamé Botué	7 August 2002 (aged 19)	3	0	(French Football Federation) Ajaccio
27	GK	Kilian Nikiema	22 June 2003 (aged 18)	0	0	(Royal Dutch Football Association) ADO Den Haag
28	FW	Dango Ouattara	11 February 2002 (aged 19)	0	0	(French Football Federation) Lorient

=== Cameroon ===
Head coach: (Portugal) Toni Conceição

A 40-man provisional squad was announced on 10 December 2021. A 28-man final squad was announced on 22 December 2021.

No.	Pos.	Player	Date of birth (age)	Caps	Goals	Club
1	GK	Jean Efala	11 August 1992 (aged 29)	5	0	(Nigeria Football Federation) Akwa United
2	DF	Enzo Ebosse	11 March 1999 (aged 22)	0	0	(French Football Federation) Angers
3	FW	Moumi Ngamaleu	9 July 1994 (aged 27)	32	4	(Swiss Football Association) Young Boys
4	DF	Harold Moukoudi	27 November 1997 (aged 24)	7	0	(French Football Federation) Saint-Étienne
5	DF	Michael Ngadeu-Ngadjui	23 November 1990 (aged 31)	44	4	(Royal Belgian Football Association) Gent
6	DF	Ambroise Oyongo	22 June 1991 (aged 30)	43	2	(French Football Federation) Montpellier
7	FW	Clinton N'Jie	15 August 1993 (aged 28)	36	10	(Russian Football Union) Dynamo Moscow
8	MF	André-Frank Zambo Anguissa	16 November 1995 (aged 26)	35	5	(Italian Football Federation) Napoli
9	FW	Stéphane Bahoken	28 May 1992 (aged 29)	19	3	(French Football Federation) Angers
10	FW	Vincent Aboubakar (captain)	22 January 1992 (aged 29)	77	25	(Saudi Arabian Football Federation) Al Nassr
11	FW	Christian Bassogog	18 October 1995 (aged 26)	37	6	(Chinese Football Association) Shanghai Shenhua
12	FW	Karl Toko Ekambi	14 September 1992 (aged 29)	40	5	(French Football Federation) Lyon
13	FW	Eric Maxim Choupo-Moting	23 March 1989 (aged 32)	61	17	(German Football Association) Bayern Munich
14	MF	Samuel Gouet	14 December 1997 (aged 24)	11	0	(Royal Belgian Football Association) Mechelen
15	MF	Pierre Kunde	26 July 1995 (aged 26)	24	1	(Hellenic Football Federation) Olympiacos
16	GK	Devis Epassy	2 February 1993 (aged 28)	5	0	(Hellenic Football Federation) OFI
17	DF	Olivier Mbaizo	15 August 1997 (aged 24)	6	0	(United States Soccer Federation) Philadelphia Union
18	MF	Martin Hongla	16 March 1998 (aged 23)	11	0	(Italian Football Federation) Hellas Verona
19	DF	Collins Fai	23 November 1992 (aged 29)	40	0	(Royal Belgian Football Association) Standard Liège
20	FW	Ignatius Ganago	16 February 1999 (aged 22)	7	0	(French Football Federation) Lens
21	DF	Jean-Charles Castelletto	26 January 1995 (aged 26)	4	0	(French Football Federation) Nantes
22	DF	Jérôme Onguéné	22 December 1997 (aged 24)	8	0	(Austrian Football Association) Red Bull Salzburg
23	GK	Simon Omossola	5 May 1998 (aged 23)	2	0	(Congolese Association Football Federation) AS Vita
24	GK	André Onana	2 April 1996 (aged 25)	20	0	(Royal Dutch Football Association) Ajax
25	DF	Nouhou Tolo	23 June 1997 (aged 24)	6	0	(United States Soccer Federation) Seattle Sounders FC
26	MF	Jean Onana	8 January 2000 (aged 22)	3	0	(French Football Federation) Bordeaux
27	MF	James Léa Siliki	12 June 1996 (aged 25)	5	0	(The Football Association) Middlesbrough
28	MF	Yvan Neyou	3 January 1997 (aged 25)	3	0	(French Football Federation) Saint-Étienne

=== Cape Verde ===
Head coach: Bubista

A 26-man final squad was announced on 23 December 2021. On 3 January 2022, Delmiro and Elber Evora were added to the squad to reach the maximum of 28 players. On 7 January 2022, Djaniny withdrew due to injury and was replaced by Vagner Gonçalves.

No.	Pos.	Player	Date of birth (age)	Caps	Goals	Club
1	GK	Vozinha	3 June 1986 (aged 35)	51	0	(Cyprus Football Association) AEL Limassol
2	DF	Stopira (captain)	20 May 1988 (aged 33)	45	2	(Hungarian Football Federation) Fehérvár
3	DF	Diney	17 January 1995 (aged 26)	6	0	(Royal Moroccan Football Federation) AS FAR
4	DF	Roberto Lopes	17 June 1992 (aged 29)	8	0	(Football Association of Ireland) Shamrock Rovers
5	MF	Nuno Borges	31 March 1988 (aged 33)	8	0	(Portuguese Football Federation) Casa Pia
6	MF	Marco Soares	16 June 1984 (aged 37)	52	3	(Portuguese Football Federation) Arouca
7	MF	Patrick Andrade	9 February 1993 (aged 28)	8	0	(Association of Football Federations of Azerbaijan) Qarabağ
8	FW	Lisandro Semedo	12 March 1996 (aged 25)	8	1	(Royal Dutch Football Association) Fortuna Sittard
9	FW	Gilson Tavares	29 December 2001 (aged 20)	4	0	(Portuguese Football Federation) Estoril Praia
10	MF	Jamiro Monteiro	28 November 1993 (aged 28)	12	1	(United States Soccer Federation) Philadelphia Union
11	FW	Garry Rodrigues	27 November 1990 (aged 31)	38	6	(Hellenic Football Federation) Olympiacos
12	GK	Márcio Rosa	23 February 1997 (aged 24)	2	0	(Portuguese Football Federation) Montalegre
13	DF	Steve Furtado	22 November 1994 (aged 27)	8	0	(Bulgarian Football Union) Beroe Stara Zagora
14	DF	Carlos Ponck	13 January 1995 (aged 26)	18	0	(Turkish Football Federation) İstanbul Başakşehir
15	FW	Willis Furtado	4 September 1997 (aged 24)	3	0	(Norwegian Football Federation) Jerv
16	DF	Dylan Tavares	30 August 1996 (aged 25)	8	1	(Swiss Football Association) Neuchâtel Xamax
17	DF	Steven Fortès	17 April 1992 (aged 29)	8	0	(Royal Belgian Football Association) Oostende
18	MF	Kenny Rocha	3 January 2000 (aged 22)	10	0	(Royal Belgian Football Association) Oostende
19	FW	Júlio Tavares	19 November 1988 (aged 33)	42	6	(Saudi Arabian Football Federation) Al Faisaly
20	FW	Ryan Mendes	8 January 1990 (aged 32)	55	12	(United Arab Emirates Football Association) Al-Nasr
21	FW	Vagner Gonçalves	10 January 1996 (aged 25)	3	1	(Swiss Football Association) Sion
22	DF	Jeffry Fortes	22 March 1989 (aged 32)	21	0	(Royal Dutch Football Association) De Graafschap
23	GK	Kevin Sousa	6 June 1994 (aged 27)	0	0	(Cape Verdean Football Federation) Mindelense
24	MF	João Paulo	26 May 1998 (aged 23)	1	0	(Portuguese Football Federation) Feirense
25	FW	Willy Semedo	27 April 1994 (aged 27)	3	0	(Cyprus Football Association) Pafos
26	MF	Nenass	5 July 1995 (aged 26)	1	0	(Norwegian Football Federation) Aalesunds FK
27	DF	Delmiro	29 August 1988 (aged 33)	1	0	(Cyprus Football Association) Aris Limassol
28	GK	Elber Evora	2 December 1999 (aged 22)	0	0	(Cyprus Football Association) AEL Limassol

=== Ethiopia ===
Head coach: Wubetu Abate

A 25-man final squad was announced on 24 December 2021.

No.	Pos.	Player	Date of birth (age)	Caps	Goals	Club
1	GK	Jemal Tassew	27 April 1989 (aged 32)	34	0	(Ethiopian Football Federation) Fasil Kenema
2	DF	Suleman Hamid	20 October 1997 (aged 24)	9	0	(Ethiopian Football Federation) Saint George
3	MF	Mesud Mohammed	18 February 1990 (aged 31)	22	3	(Ethiopian Football Federation) Jimma Aba Jifar
4	DF	Mignot Debebe	2 September 1995 (aged 26)	4	0	(Ethiopian Football Federation) Saint George
5	DF	Desta Yohannes	17 April 1998 (aged 23)	8	0	(Ethiopian Football Federation) Adama City
6	MF	Gatoch Panom	30 November 1994 (aged 27)	42	7	(Ethiopian Football Federation) Saint George
8	MF	Amanuel Yohannes	14 March 1999 (aged 22)	14	0	(Ethiopian Football Federation) Ethiopian Coffee
9	FW	Getaneh Kebede (captain)	2 April 1992 (aged 29)	61	32	(Ethiopian Football Federation) Wolkite City
10	FW	Abubeker Nassir	23 February 2000 (aged 21)	15	4	(Ethiopian Football Federation) Ethiopian Coffee
11	FW	Amanuel Gebremichael	5 February 1999 (aged 22)	25	4	(Ethiopian Football Federation) Saint George
12	MF	Yihun Endashew	5 November 1992 (aged 29)	13	0	(Ethiopian Football Federation) Fasil Kenema
13	MF	Firew Solomon	18 September 1992 (aged 29)	9	0	(Ethiopian Football Federation) Sidama Coffee
14	MF	Fitsum Alemu	15 July 1995 (aged 26)	4	0	(Ethiopian Football Federation) Bahir Dar Kenema
15	DF	Aschalew Tamene	22 November 1991 (aged 30)	57	3	(Ethiopian Football Federation) Fasil Kenema
16	DF	Yared Bayeh	22 January 1995 (aged 26)	25	1	(Ethiopian Football Federation) Fasil Kenema
17	MF	Bezabeh Meleyo	26 June 1995 (aged 26)	4	0	(Ethiopian Football Federation) Fasil Kenema
18	MF	Shimelis Bekele	17 October 1990 (aged 31)	66	10	(Egyptian Football Association) El Gouna
19	FW	Shimeket Gugesa	1 January 1995 (aged 27)	17	0	(Ethiopian Football Federation) Fasil Kenema
20	DF	Ramadan Yusef	12 February 2001 (aged 20)	19	0	(Ethiopian Football Federation) Wolkite City
21	DF	Asrat Tunjo	29 November 1996 (aged 25)	8	0	(Ethiopian Football Federation) Ethiopian Coffee
22	GK	Teklemariam Shanko	2 January 1998 (aged 24)	11	0	(Ethiopian Football Federation) Ethiopian Coffee
23	GK	Fasil Gerbremichael	17 October 2000 (aged 21)	5	0	(Ethiopian Football Federation) Bahir Dar Kenema
24	FW	Mesfin Tafesse	26 November 2001 (aged 20)	8	2	(Ethiopian Football Federation) Hawassa City
25	DF	Ahmed Reshid	3 September 1995 (aged 26)	13	0	(Ethiopian Football Federation) Bahir Dar Kenema
26	FW	Mujib Kassim	19 October 1995 (aged 26)	16	0	(Algerian Football Federation) JS Kabylie
27	FW	Dawa Hotessa	9 March 1996 (aged 25)	8	1	(Ethiopian Football Federation) Adama City
28	GK	Firew Getahun	8 September 1996 (aged 25)	0	0	(Ethiopian Football Federation) Dire Dawa City

== Group B ==
=== Guinea ===
Head coach: Kaba Diawara

A 27-man final squad was announced on 22 December 2021. On 26 December 2021, Antoine Conte and Florentin Pogba withdrew due to injury and were replaced by Fodé Camara and Youssouf Siby.

No.	Pos.	Player	Date of birth (age)	Caps	Goals	Club
1	GK	Aly Keita	8 December 1986 (aged 35)	18	0	(Swedish Football Association) Östersund
2	MF	Morlaye Sylla	27 July 1998 (aged 23)	17	3	(Guinean Football Federation) Horoya
3	DF	Issiaga Sylla	1 January 1994 (aged 28)	61	2	(French Football Federation) Toulouse
4	DF	Ibrahima Conté II	3 April 1996 (aged 25)	13	0	(French Football Federation) Niort
5	DF	Saïdou Sow	4 July 2002 (aged 19)	7	0	(French Football Federation) Saint-Étienne
6	MF	Amadou Diawara	17 July 1997 (aged 24)	18	0	(Italian Football Federation) Roma
7	MF	Ibrahima Cissé	28 February 1994 (aged 27)	12	1	(Royal Belgian Football Association) Seraing
8	MF	Naby Keïta (captain)	10 February 1995 (aged 26)	44	8	(The Football Association) Liverpool
9	FW	José Kanté	27 September 1990 (aged 31)	21	4	(Kazakhstan Football Federation) Kairat
10	FW	Morgan Guilavogui	10 March 1998 (aged 23)	2	0	(French Football Federation) Paris FC
11	FW	Mohamed Bayo	4 June 1998 (aged 23)	5	2	(French Football Federation) Clermont
12	MF	Ibrahima Conté I	3 April 1991 (aged 30)	53	4	(Israel Football Association) Bnei Sakhnin
13	DF	Mohamed Ali Camara	28 August 1997 (aged 24)	10	0	(Swiss Football Association) Young Boys
14	MF	Ilaix Moriba	19 January 2003 (aged 18)	0	0	(German Football Association) RB Leipzig
15	DF	Mikael Dyrestam	10 December 1991 (aged 30)	8	0	(Norwegian Football Federation) Sarpsborg 08
16	GK	Moussa Camara	27 November 1998 (aged 23)	18	0	(Guinean Football Federation) Horoya
17	DF	Ousmane Kanté	21 September 1989 (aged 32)	8	0	(French Football Federation) Paris FC
18	FW	Seydouba Soumah	11 June 1991 (aged 30)	36	9	(Kuwait Football Association) Kuwait SC
19	MF	Mamadou Kané	22 January 1997 (aged 24)	12	2	(Association of Football Federations of Azerbaijan) Neftçi
20	DF	Pa Konate	25 April 1994 (aged 27)	5	0	(Bulgarian Football Union) Botev Plovdiv
21	FW	Sory Kaba	10 April 1995 (aged 26)	16	3	(Royal Belgian Football Association) OH Leuven
22	GK	Ibrahim Koné	5 December 1989 (aged 32)	5	0	(Malta Football Association) Hibernians
23	MF	Aguibou Camara	20 May 2001 (aged 20)	9	1	(Hellenic Football Federation) Olympiacos
24	MF	Mory Konaté	15 November 1993 (aged 28)	0	0	(Royal Belgian Football Association) Sint-Truiden
25	FW	Mamadou Diallo	19 September 1994 (aged 27)	0	0	(French Football Federation) Grenoble
26	DF	Fodé Camara	23 June 2002 (aged 19)	0	0	(Guinean Football Federation) Horoya
27	MF	Youssouf Siby	15 April 2000 (aged 21)	0	0	(Guinean Football Federation) Wakriya

=== Malawi ===
Head coach: (Romania) Mario Marinică

A 43-man provisional squad, including 13 standby players, was announced on 22 December 2021. A 23-man final squad was announced on 1 January 2022. Additionally to the squad named for the tournament, 5 players (Stain Davie, Paul Ndhlovu, Gerald Phiri Jr., Brighton Munthali, and Daniel Austin Chimbalanga) were named as reserves and will be available in case of eventualities.

No.	Pos.	Player	Date of birth (age)	Caps	Goals	Club
1	GK	Charles Thomu	24 January 1999 (aged 22)	0	0	(Football Association of Malawi) Silver Strikers
2	DF	Stanley Sanudi	2 February 1995 (aged 26)	59	0	(Football Association of Malawi) Mighty Wanderers
3	MF	Charles Petro	8 February 2001 (aged 20)	23	0	(Moldovan Football Federation) Sheriff Tiraspol
4	DF	Peter Cholopi	19 August 1996 (aged 25)	15	0	(Football Association of Malawi) Mighty Wanderers
5	DF	Dennis Chembezi	15 January 1997 (aged 24)	25	0	(South African Football Association) Polokwane City
6	MF	Chikoti Chirwa	9 March 1992 (aged 29)	26	2	(Football Association of Malawi) Red Lions
7	MF	Micium Mhone	19 January 1992 (aged 29)	39	3	(Football Association of Malawi) Blue Eagles
8	MF	Chimwemwe Idana	7 September 1998 (aged 23)	25	2	(Football Association of Malawi) Nyasa Big Bullets
9	FW	Richard Mbulu	25 January 1994 (aged 27)	33	5	(South African Football Association) Baroka
10	FW	Francisco Madinga	11 February 2000 (aged 21)	7	0	(Georgian Football Federation) Dila Gori
11	FW	Gabadinho Mhango	27 September 1992 (aged 29)	55	12	(South African Football Association) Orlando Pirates
12	DF	Mark Fodya	22 December 1997 (aged 24)	4	0	(Football Association of Malawi) Silver Strikers
13	FW	Peter Banda	22 September 2000 (aged 21)	15	0	(Tanzania Football Federation) Simba
14	FW	Robin Ngalande	2 November 1992 (aged 29)	42	1	(Ethiopian Football Federation) Saint George
15	DF	Lawrence Chaziya	19 August 1998 (aged 23)	1	0	(Football Association of Malawi) CIVO United
16	GK	Ernest Kakhobwe	26 June 1993 (aged 28)	24	0	(Football Association of Malawi) Nyasa Big Bullets
17	MF	John Banda	6 February 1992 (aged 29)	71	7	(Mozambican Football Federation) Songo
18	FW	Zebron Kalima	13 May 2002 (aged 19)	1	0	(Football Association of Malawi) Silver Strikers
19	DF	Limbikani Mzava (captain)	12 November 1993 (aged 28)	58	2	(South African Football Association) AmaZulu
20	FW	Yamikani Chester	20 December 1994 (aged 27)	27	0	(Football Association of Malawi) Mighty Wanderers
21	DF	Gomezgani Chirwa	25 September 1996 (aged 25)	14	0	(Football Association of Malawi) Nyasa Big Bullets
22	FW	Khuda Muyaba	26 January 1993 (aged 28)	18	4	(South African Football Association) Polokwane City
23	GK	William Thole	2 October 1998 (aged 23)	3	0	(Football Association of Malawi) Mighty Wanderers
24	GK	Brighton Munthali	11 December 1997 (aged 24)	19	0	(Football Association of Malawi) Silver Strikers
25	DF	Paul Ndhlovu	18 February 1989 (aged 32)	0	0	(Football Association of Malawi) MAFCO
26	FW	Stain Davie	23 November 1998 (aged 23)	0	0	(Football Association of Malawi) Silver Strikers
27	MF	Gerald Phiri Jr.	8 June 1993 (aged 28)	44	10	(Sudan Football Association) Al-Hilal Omdurman
28	DF	Daniel Austin Chimbalanga	19 January 1999 (aged 22)	0	0	(Football Association of Malawi) MAFCO

=== Senegal ===
Head coach: Aliou Cissé

A 27-man final squad was announced on 25 December 2021. Alioune Badara Faty was later added to the squad to reach the maximum of 28 players.

No.	Pos.	Player	Date of birth (age)	Caps	Goals	Club
1	GK	Seny Dieng	23 November 1994 (aged 27)	1	0	(The Football Association) Queens Park Rangers
2	DF	Saliou Ciss	15 September 1989 (aged 32)	29	0	(French Football Federation) Nancy
3	DF	Kalidou Koulibaly (captain)	20 June 1991 (aged 30)	53	0	(Italian Football Federation) Napoli
4	DF	Pape Abou Cissé	14 September 1995 (aged 26)	6	1	(Hellenic Football Federation) Olympiacos
5	MF	Idrissa Gueye	26 September 1989 (aged 32)	84	6	(French Football Federation) Paris Saint-Germain
6	MF	Nampalys Mendy	23 June 1992 (aged 29)	8	0	(The Football Association) Leicester City
7	FW	Keita Baldé	8 March 1995 (aged 26)	36	6	(Italian Football Federation) Cagliari
8	MF	Cheikhou Kouyaté	21 December 1989 (aged 32)	73	3	(The Football Association) Crystal Palace
9	FW	Boulaye Dia	16 November 1996 (aged 25)	9	1	(Royal Spanish Football Federation) Villarreal
10	FW	Sadio Mané	10 April 1992 (aged 29)	80	26	(The Football Association) Liverpool
11	FW	Habib Diallo	18 June 1995 (aged 26)	10	2	(French Football Federation) Strasbourg
12	DF	Fodé Ballo-Touré	3 January 1997 (aged 25)	8	0	(Italian Football Federation) Milan
13	MF	Joseph Lopy	15 March 1992 (aged 29)	5	0	(French Football Federation) Sochaux
14	DF	Abdoulaye Seck	4 June 1992 (aged 29)	5	0	(Royal Belgian Football Association) Antwerp
15	FW	Bamba Dieng	23 March 2000 (aged 21)	3	0	(French Football Federation) Marseille
16	GK	Édouard Mendy	1 March 1992 (aged 29)	16	0	(The Football Association) Chelsea
17	MF	Pape Matar Sarr	14 September 2002 (aged 19)	4	0	(French Football Federation) Metz
18	FW	Ismaïla Sarr	25 February 1998 (aged 23)	40	9	(The Football Association) Watford
19	FW	Famara Diédhiou	15 December 1992 (aged 29)	18	9	(Turkish Football Federation) Alanyaspor
20	DF	Bouna Sarr	31 January 1992 (aged 29)	4	0	(German Football Association) Bayern Munich
21	DF	Ibrahima Mbaye	19 November 1994 (aged 27)	6	0	(Italian Football Federation) Bologna
22	DF	Abdou Diallo	4 May 1996 (aged 25)	7	1	(French Football Federation) Paris Saint-Germain
23	GK	Alfred Gomis	5 September 1993 (aged 28)	13	0	(French Football Federation) Rennes
24	MF	Moustapha Name	5 May 1995 (aged 26)	5	0	(French Football Federation) Paris FC
25	MF	Mamadou Loum	30 December 1996 (aged 25)	3	0	(Royal Spanish Football Federation) Alavés
26	MF	Pape Gueye	24 January 1999 (aged 22)	1	0	(French Football Federation) Marseille
27	FW	Mame Thiam	9 October 1992 (aged 29)	3	0	(Turkish Football Federation) Kayserispor
28	GK	Alioune Badara Faty	3 May 1999 (aged 22)	0	0	(Senegalese Football Federation) Casa Sports

=== Zimbabwe ===
Head coach: Norman Mapeza

A 30-man provisional squad was announced on 21 December 2021. A 23-man final squad was announced on 29 December 2021. Panashe Mutimbanyoka, Bill Antonio and Temptation Chiwunga were also registered for the tournament but did not travel to Cameroon.

No.	Pos.	Player	Date of birth (age)	Caps	Goals	Club
1	GK	Petros Mhari	15 April 1989 (aged 32)	2	0	(Zimbabwe Football Association) Platinum
2	DF	Godknows Murwira	4 July 1993 (aged 28)	2	0	(Zimbabwe Football Association) Dynamos
3	DF	Jordan Zemura	14 November 1999 (aged 22)	4	0	(The Football Association) Bournemouth
4	MF	Kelvin Madzongwe	1 May 1990 (aged 31)	7	0	(Zimbabwe Football Association) Platinum
5	DF	Gerald Takwara	29 October 1994 (aged 27)	11	0	(South African Football Association) Venda Football Academy
6	DF	Alec Mudimu	8 April 1995 (aged 26)	26	0	(Georgian Football Federation) Torpedo Kutaisi
7	MF	Ishmael Wadi	19 December 1992 (aged 29)	4	0	(South African Football Association) JDR Stars
8	MF	Kundai Benyu	12 December 1997 (aged 24)	2	0	(Football Association of Iceland) Vestri
9	FW	David Moyo	17 December 1994 (aged 27)	5	0	(Scottish Football Association) Hamilton Academical
10	FW	Tino Kadewere	5 January 1996 (aged 26)	18	3	(French Football Federation) Lyon
11	MF	Never Tigere	16 December 1990 (aged 31)	4	1	(Tanzania Football Federation) Azam
12	DF	Bruce Kangwa	24 February 1988 (aged 33)	15	0	(Tanzania Football Federation) Azam
13	MF	Thabani Kamusoko	2 March 1988 (aged 33)	17	0	(Football Association of Zambia) ZESCO United
14	DF	Onismor Bhasera	7 January 1986 (aged 36)	41	0	(South African Football Association) SuperSport United
15	DF	Teenage Hadebe	17 September 1995 (aged 26)	32	3	(United States Soccer Federation) Houston Dynamo FC
16	MF	Kudakwashe Mahachi	29 September 1993 (aged 28)	41	4	(South African Football Association) SuperSport United
17	FW	Knowledge Musona (captain)	21 June 1990 (aged 31)	48	23	(Saudi Arabian Football Federation) Al-Tai
18	FW	Prince Dube	17 February 1997 (aged 24)	12	7	(Tanzania Football Federation) Azam
19	FW	Admiral Muskwe	21 August 1998 (aged 23)	3	1	(The Football Association) Luton Town
20	DF	Peter Muduhwa	11 August 1993 (aged 28)	10	0	(Zimbabwe Football Association) Highlanders
21	GK	Talbert Shumba	12 May 1990 (aged 31)	10	0	(South African Football Association) Free State Stars
22	DF	Takudzwa Chimwemwe	26 October 1992 (aged 29)	9	0	(Football Association of Zambia) Nkana
23	GK	Martin Mapisa	25 May 1998 (aged 23)	2	0	(Royal Spanish Football Federation) Zamora
24	MF	Temptation Chiwunga	10 March 1992 (aged 29)	0	0	(South African Football Association) JDR Stars
25	MF	Bill Antonio	3 September 2002 (aged 19)	1	0	(Zimbabwe Football Association) Dynamos
26	FW	Panashe Mutimbanyoka	21 February 2002 (aged 19)	0	0	(Zimbabwe Football Association) Platinum

== Group C ==
=== Comoros ===
Head coach: (France) Amir Abdou

A 26-man final squad was announced on 23 December 2021. Following the squad announcement, Alexis Souahy and Ibroihim Djoudja were added to the squad to reach the maximum of 28 players.

No.	Pos.	Player	Date of birth (age)	Caps	Goals	Club
1	GK	Salim Ben Boina	19 July 1991 (aged 30)	12	0	(French Football Federation) Marseille Endoume
2	DF	Kassim Abdallah	9 April 1987 (aged 34)	26	0	(French Football Federation) Marignane Gignac
3	DF	Chaker Alhadhur	4 December 1991 (aged 30)	29	1	(French Football Federation) Ajaccio
4	DF	Younn Zahary	20 October 1998 (aged 23)	2	0	(French Football Federation) Cholet
5	DF	Abdallah Ali Mohamed	11 April 1999 (aged 22)	11	0	(Swiss Football Association) Stade Lausanne
6	DF	Jimmy Abdou (captain)	13 July 1984 (aged 37)	33	0	(French Football Federation) Martigues
7	FW	Faïz Selemani	14 November 1993 (aged 28)	14	2	(Royal Belgian Football Association) Kortrijk
8	MF	Fouad Bachirou	15 April 1990 (aged 31)	26	0	(Cyprus Football Association) Omonia
9	FW	Mohamed M'Changama	9 June 1987 (aged 34)	19	2	(Football Federation of the Islamic Republic of Mauritania) Nouadhibou
10	MF	Youssouf M'Changama	29 August 1990 (aged 31)	40	8	(French Football Federation) Guingamp
11	MF	Nakibou Aboubakari	10 March 1993 (aged 28)	6	0	(French Football Federation) Sète 34
12	DF	Kassim M'Dahoma	26 January 1997 (aged 24)	14	0	(French Football Federation) Avranches
13	MF	Rafidine Abdullah	15 January 1994 (aged 27)	12	0	(Swiss Football Association) Stade Lausanne
14	FW	Ali M'Madi	21 April 1990 (aged 31)	29	0	(French Football Federation) Épinal
15	DF	Benjaloud Youssouf	11 February 1994 (aged 27)	24	1	(French Football Federation) Châteauroux
16	GK	Moyadh Ousseni	2 April 1993 (aged 28)	1	0	(French Football Federation) Fréjus St-Raphaël
17	FW	Ibroihim Djoudja	6 May 1994 (aged 27)	9	3	(South African Football Association) TS Sporting
18	MF	Yacine Bourhane	30 September 1998 (aged 23)	4	0	(Royal Dutch Football Association) Go Ahead Eagles
19	DF	Mohamed Youssouf	26 March 1988 (aged 33)	26	1	(French Football Federation) Ajaccio
20	FW	Ahmed Mogni	10 October 1991 (aged 30)	13	0	(French Football Federation) Annecy
21	FW	El Fardou Ben Nabouhane	10 June 1989 (aged 32)	28	15	(Football Association of Serbia) Red Star Belgrade
22	FW	Saïd Bakari	22 September 1994 (aged 27)	16	0	(Royal Dutch Football Association) RKC Waalwijk
23	GK	Ali Ahamada	19 August 1991 (aged 30)	26	0	Unattached
24	FW	Faiz Mattoir	12 July 2000 (aged 21)	4	1	(French Football Federation) Cholet
25	FW	Moussa Djoumoi	16 July 1999 (aged 22)	1	1	(French Football Federation) Saint-Priest
26	MF	Iyad Mohamed	5 March 2001 (aged 20)	1	0	(French Football Federation) Auxerre
27	DF	Kassim Ahamada	8 April 1992 (aged 29)	10	0	(French Football Federation) US Créteil
28	DF	Alexis Souahy	13 January 1995 (aged 26)	1	0	(United States Soccer Federation) New Mexico United

=== Gabon ===
Head coach: (France) Patrice Neveu

A 30-man provisional squad was announced on 18 December 2021.

No.	Pos.	Player	Date of birth (age)	Caps	Goals	Club
1	GK	Jean-Noël Amonome	24 December 1997 (aged 24)	4	0	(South African Football Association) AmaZulu
2	DF	Alex Moucketou-Moussounda	10 October 2000 (aged 21)	3	0	(Cyprus Football Association) Aris Limassol
3	DF	Anthony Oyono	12 April 2001 (aged 20)	4	0	(French Football Federation) Boulogne
4	DF	Sidney Obissa	4 May 2000 (aged 21)	3	0	(Royal Belgian Football Association) Olympic Charleroi
5	DF	Bruno Ecuele Manga	16 July 1988 (aged 33)	91	9	(French Football Federation) Dijon
6	DF	Johann Obiang	5 July 1993 (aged 28)	38	0	(French Football Federation) Rodez
7	FW	Aaron Boupendza	7 August 1996 (aged 25)	22	4	(Qatar Football Association) Al-Arabi
8	DF	Lloyd Palun	28 November 1988 (aged 33)	66	0	(French Football Federation) Bastia
9	FW	Pierre-Emerick Aubameyang (captain)	18 June 1989 (aged 32)	71	29	(Royal Spanish Football Federation) Barcelona
10	FW	Axel Méyé	6 June 1995 (aged 26)	27	2	(Royal Moroccan Football Federation) Ittihad Tanger
11	FW	Jim Allevinah	27 February 1995 (aged 26)	12	2	(French Football Federation) Clermont
12	MF	Guélor Kanga	1 August 1990 (aged 31)	52	2	(Football Association of Serbia) Red Star Belgrade
13	FW	Kévin Mayi	14 January 1993 (aged 28)	3	0	(Turkish Football Federation) Ümraniyespor
14	FW	Louis Ameka	3 October 1996 (aged 25)	19	0	(Royal Moroccan Football Federation) Maghreb de Fès
15	FW	Ulrick Eneme Ella	22 May 2001 (aged 20)	1	0	(The Football Association) Brighton & Hove Albion
16	GK	Anthony Mfa Mezui	7 March 1991 (aged 30)	18	0	(Luxembourg Football Federation) Rodange 91
17	MF	André Biyogo Poko	7 March 1993 (aged 28)	66	3	(Turkish Football Federation) Altay
18	MF	Mario Lemina	1 September 1993 (aged 28)	23	3	(French Football Federation) Nice
19	MF	Serge-Junior Martinsson Ngouali	23 January 1992 (aged 29)	12	0	(Croatian Football Federation) Gorica
20	FW	Denis Bouanga	11 November 1994 (aged 27)	25	7	(French Football Federation) Saint-Étienne
21	GK	Junior Fotso Noubi	20 June 1999 (aged 22)	0	0	(French Football Federation) Vannes
22	FW	Fahd Ndzengue	7 July 2000 (aged 21)	2	0	(Football Association of Slovenia) Tabor Sežana
23	GK	Donald Nzé	5 April 1992 (aged 29)	3	0	(Congolese Association Football Federation) Maniema Union
24	DF	David Sambissa	11 January 1996 (aged 25)	2	0	(Royal Dutch Football Association) Cambuur
25	DF	Junior Assoumou	22 July 1995 (aged 26)	13	0	(French Football Federation) Le Mans
26	MF	Medwin Biteghé	1 September 1996 (aged 25)	6	0	(Libyan Football Federation) Al-Hilal Benghazi
27	DF	Gilchrist Nguema	7 August 1996 (aged 25)	4	0	Unattached
28	DF	Yannis N'Gakoutou	30 September 1998 (aged 23)	0	0	(French Football Federation) Lyon La Duchère

=== Ghana ===
Head coach: (Serbia) Milovan Rajevac

A 30-man provisional squad was announced on 21 December 2021. A 28-man final squad was named on 3 January 2022.

No.	Pos.	Player	Date of birth (age)	Caps	Goals	Club
1	GK	Abdul Manaf Nurudeen	8 February 1999 (aged 22)	0	0	(Royal Belgian Football Association) Eupen
2	DF	Andy Yiadom	2 December 1991 (aged 30)	17	0	(The Football Association) Reading
3	DF	Philomon Baffour	6 February 2001 (aged 20)	0	0	(Ghana Football Association) Dreams
4	DF	Jonathan Mensah	13 July 1990 (aged 31)	67	1	(United States Soccer Federation) Columbus Crew
5	MF	Thomas Partey	13 June 1993 (aged 28)	34	12	(The Football Association) Arsenal
6	MF	Edmund Addo	17 May 2000 (aged 21)	1	0	(Moldovan Football Federation) Sheriff Tiraspol
7	FW	Abdul Fatawu	8 March 2004 (aged 17)	2	0	(Ghana Football Association) Dreams
8	MF	Daniel-Kofi Kyereh	8 March 1996 (aged 25)	5	0	(German Football Association) FC St. Pauli
9	FW	Jordan Ayew	11 September 1991 (aged 30)	73	18	(The Football Association) Crystal Palace
10	FW	André Ayew (captain)	17 December 1989 (aged 32)	100	22	(Qatar Football Association) Al-Sadd
11	MF	Mubarak Wakaso	25 July 1990 (aged 31)	67	13	(Chinese Football Association) Shenzhen
12	GK	Lawrence Ati-Zigi	29 November 1996 (aged 25)	7	0	(Swiss Football Association) St. Gallen
13	FW	Richmond Boakye	28 January 1993 (aged 28)	15	6	(Israel Football Association) Beitar Jerusalem
14	DF	Gideon Mensah	18 July 1998 (aged 23)	6	0	(French Football Federation) Bordeaux
15	MF	Joseph Paintsil	1 February 1998 (aged 23)	4	3	(Royal Belgian Football Association) Genk
16	GK	Joe Wollacott	8 September 1996 (aged 25)	4	0	(The Football Association) Swindon Town
17	DF	Baba Rahman	2 July 1994 (aged 27)	40	1	(The Football Association) Reading
18	DF	Daniel Amartey	1 December 1994 (aged 27)	33	0	(The Football Association) Leicester City
19	FW	Samuel Owusu	28 March 1996 (aged 25)	15	1	(Saudi Arabian Football Federation) Al-Fayha
20	MF	Mohammed Kudus	2 August 2000 (aged 21)	10	3	(Royal Dutch Football Association) Ajax
21	MF	Iddrisu Baba	22 January 1996 (aged 25)	11	0	(Royal Spanish Football Federation) Mallorca
22	FW	Kamaldeen Sulemana	15 February 2002 (aged 19)	6	0	(French Football Federation) Rennes
23	DF	Alexander Djiku	9 August 1994 (aged 27)	11	0	(French Football Federation) Strasbourg
24	GK	Richard Attah	9 April 1995 (aged 26)	0	0	(Ghana Football Association) Hearts of Oak
25	FW	Benjamin Tetteh	10 July 1997 (aged 24)	2	0	(Turkish Football Federation) Yeni Malatyaspor
26	DF	Abdul Mumin	6 June 1998 (aged 23)	0	0	(Portuguese Football Federation) Vitória de Guimarães
27	FW	Maxwell Abbey Quaye	2 February 1998 (aged 23)	0	0	(Ghana Football Association) Great Olympics
28	MF	David Abagna	9 September 1998 (aged 23)	0	0	(Ghana Football Association) Real Tamale

=== Morocco ===
Head coach: (Bosnia and Herzegovina) Vahid Halilhodžić

A 25-man final squad was announced on 23 December 2021. On 28 December 2021, Badr Benoun, Mohamed Chibi, and Soufiane Rahimi were added to the squad to reach the maximum of 28 players. On 30 December 2021, Anas Zniti withdrew due to injury and was replaced by Ahmed Reda Tagnaouti. On 10 January 2022, Badr Benoun withdrew due to injury and was replaced by Achraf Bencharki.

No.	Pos.	Player	Date of birth (age)	Caps	Goals	Club
1	GK	Yassine Bounou	5 April 1991 (aged 30)	35	0	(Royal Spanish Football Federation) Sevilla
2	DF	Achraf Hakimi	4 November 1998 (aged 23)	41	5	(French Football Federation) Paris Saint-Germain
3	DF	Adam Masina	2 January 1994 (aged 28)	7	0	(The Football Association) Watford
4	MF	Sofyan Amrabat	21 August 1996 (aged 25)	27	0	(Italian Football Federation) Fiorentina
5	DF	Nayef Aguerd	30 March 1996 (aged 25)	12	1	(French Football Federation) Rennes
6	DF	Romain Saïss (captain)	26 March 1990 (aged 31)	54	1	(The Football Association) Wolverhampton Wanderers
7	MF	Imran Louza	1 May 1999 (aged 22)	5	2	(The Football Association) Watford
8	MF	Azzedine Ounahi	19 April 2000 (aged 21)	0	0	(French Football Federation) Angers
9	FW	Ayoub El Kaabi	25 June 1993 (aged 28)	28	19	(Turkish Football Federation) Hatayspor
10	FW	Munir El Haddadi	1 September 1995 (aged 26)	8	2	(Royal Spanish Football Federation) Sevilla
11	MF	Fayçal Fajr	1 August 1988 (aged 33)	44	3	(Turkish Football Federation) Sivasspor
12	GK	Munir Mohamedi	10 May 1989 (aged 32)	41	0	(Turkish Football Federation) Hatayspor
13	MF	Ilias Chair	30 October 1997 (aged 24)	7	1	(The Football Association) Queens Park Rangers
14	FW	Zakaria Aboukhlal	18 February 2000 (aged 21)	5	1	(Royal Dutch Football Association) AZ
15	MF	Selim Amallah	15 November 1996 (aged 25)	12	3	(Royal Belgian Football Association) Standard Liège
16	MF	Aymen Barkok	21 May 1998 (aged 23)	14	1	(German Football Association) Eintracht Frankfurt
17	FW	Sofiane Boufal	17 September 1993 (aged 28)	22	1	(French Football Federation) Angers
18	DF	Sofian Chakla	2 September 1993 (aged 28)	3	0	(Royal Belgian Football Association) OH Leuven
19	FW	Youssef En-Nesyri	1 June 1997 (aged 24)	40	11	(Royal Spanish Football Federation) Sevilla
20	DF	Sofiane Alakouch	29 July 1998 (aged 23)	2	0	(French Football Federation) Metz
21	DF	Souffian El Karouani	19 October 2000 (aged 21)	3	0	(Royal Dutch Football Association) NEC
22	GK	Ahmed Reda Tagnaouti	5 April 1996 (aged 25)	17	0	(Royal Moroccan Football Federation) Wydad Casablanca
23	FW	Ryan Mmaee	1 November 1997 (aged 24)	7	4	(Hungarian Football Federation) Ferencváros
24	DF	Samy Mmaee	8 September 1996 (aged 25)	5	0	(Hungarian Football Federation) Ferencváros
25	DF	Mohamed Chibi	21 January 1993 (aged 28)	5	1	(Royal Moroccan Football Federation) AS FAR
26	FW	Achraf Bencharki	24 September 1994 (aged 27)	17	1	(Egyptian Football Association) Zamalek
27	FW	Soufiane Rahimi	2 June 1996 (aged 25)	12	6	(United Arab Emirates Football Association) Al Ain
28	FW	Tarik Tissoudali	2 April 1993 (aged 28)	0	0	(Royal Belgian Football Association) Gent

== Group D ==
=== Egypt ===
Head coach: (Portugal) Carlos Queiroz

A 40-man provisional squad was announced on 19 December 2021. A 25-man final squad was announced on 29 December 2021. On the next day, Ibrahim Adel, Marwan Hamdy and Mohamed Hamdy were added to the squad to reach the maximum of 28 players. On 7 January 2022, Mohamed Hamdy withdrew from the squad due to a knee injury and was replaced by Marwan Dawoud.

No.	Pos.	Player	Date of birth (age)	Caps	Goals	Club
1	GK	Mohamed El Shenawy	18 December 1988 (aged 33)	35	0	(Egyptian Football Association) Al Ahly
2	DF	Mohamed Abdelmonem	1 February 1999 (aged 22)	2	0	(Egyptian Football Association) Future
3	DF	Omar Kamal	29 September 1993 (aged 28)	5	0	(Egyptian Football Association) Future
4	MF	Amr El Solia	2 April 1990 (aged 31)	39	1	(Egyptian Football Association) Al Ahly
5	MF	Hamdy Fathy	29 September 1994 (aged 27)	16	2	(Egyptian Football Association) Al Ahly
6	DF	Ahmed Hegazi	25 January 1991 (aged 30)	73	2	(Saudi Arabian Football Federation) Al Ittihad
7	FW	Trézéguet	1 October 1994 (aged 27)	48	7	(The Football Association) Aston Villa
8	MF	Emam Ashour	20 February 1998 (aged 23)	1	0	(Egyptian Football Association) Zamalek
9	FW	Mohamed Sherif	4 February 1996 (aged 25)	14	5	(Egyptian Football Association) Al Ahly
10	FW	Mohamed Salah (captain)	15 June 1992 (aged 29)	74	45	(The Football Association) Liverpool
11	FW	Ramadan Sobhi	23 January 1997 (aged 24)	34	2	(Egyptian Football Association) Pyramids
12	DF	Ayman Ashraf	9 April 1991 (aged 30)	25	2	(Egyptian Football Association) Al Ahly
13	DF	Ahmed Fatouh	22 March 1998 (aged 23)	13	1	(Egyptian Football Association) Zamalek
14	FW	Mostafa Mohamed	28 November 1997 (aged 24)	10	2	(Turkish Football Federation) Galatasaray
15	DF	Mahmoud Hamdy	1 June 1995 (aged 26)	18	2	(Egyptian Football Association) Zamalek
16	GK	Mohamed Abou Gabal	29 January 1989 (aged 32)	3	0	(Egyptian Football Association) Zamalek
17	MF	Mohamed Elneny	11 July 1992 (aged 29)	83	8	(The Football Association) Arsenal
18	MF	Mohanad Lasheen	29 May 1996 (aged 25)	5	0	(Egyptian Football Association) Tala'ea El Gaish
19	MF	Abdallah El Said	13 July 1985 (aged 36)	56	6	(Egyptian Football Association) Pyramids
20	DF	Mahmoud Alaa	28 January 1991 (aged 30)	13	0	(Egyptian Football Association) Zamalek
21	MF	Ahmed Sayed	10 January 1996 (aged 25)	13	1	(Egyptian Football Association) Zamalek
22	FW	Omar Marmoush	7 February 1999 (aged 22)	2	1	(German Football Association) VfB Stuttgart
23	GK	Mohamed Sobhy	15 July 1999 (aged 22)	0	0	(Egyptian Football Association) Pharco
24	GK	Mahmoud Gad	1 October 1998 (aged 23)	0	0	(Egyptian Football Association) ENPPI
25	DF	Akram Tawfik	8 November 1997 (aged 24)	8	1	(Egyptian Football Association) Al Ahly
26	FW	Ibrahim Adel	23 April 2001 (aged 20)	1	0	(Egyptian Football Association) Pyramids
27	DF	Marwan Dawoud	27 August 1997 (aged 24)	2	1	(Egyptian Football Association) ENPPI
28	FW	Marwan Hamdy	15 November 1996 (aged 25)	10	1	(Egyptian Football Association) Smouha

=== Guinea-Bissau ===
Head coach: Baciro Candé

A 24-man final squad was announced on 30 December 2021.

No.	Pos.	Player	Date of birth (age)	Caps	Goals	Club
1	GK	Jonas Mendes (captain)	20 November 1989 (aged 32)	50	0	Unattached
2	DF	Fali Candé	24 January 1998 (aged 23)	8	0	(Portuguese Football Federation) Portimonense
3	DF	Leonel Ucha	9 May 1988 (aged 33)	7	0	(Portuguese Football Federation) Marinhense
4	DF	Simão Júnior	29 August 1998 (aged 23)	2	0	(Portuguese Football Federation) Vilafranquense
5	MF	Panutche Camará	28 February 1997 (aged 24)	0	0	(The Football Association) Plymouth Argyle
6	MF	Bura Nogueira	22 December 1995 (aged 26)	18	1	(Portuguese Football Federation) Farense
7	FW	Mauro Rodrigues	15 April 2001 (aged 20)	2	0	(Swiss Football Association) Sion
8	MF	Mimito Biai	12 December 1997 (aged 24)	0	0	(Portuguese Football Federation) Académica
9	FW	Steve Ambri	12 August 1997 (aged 24)	2	0	(French Football Federation) Sochaux
10	MF	Pelé	29 September 1991 (aged 30)	20	1	(French Football Federation) Monaco
11	FW	Jorginho	21 September 1995 (aged 26)	18	2	(Polish Football Association) Wisła Płock
12	GK	Maurice Gomis	10 November 1997 (aged 24)	0	0	(Cyprus Football Association) Ayia Napa
13	FW	Frédéric Mendy	18 September 1988 (aged 33)	21	6	(Portuguese Football Federation) Vitória de Setúbal
14	DF	Fernandy Mendy	16 January 1994 (aged 27)	0	0	(Scottish Football Association) Alloa Athletic
15	DF	Jefferson Encada	17 April 1998 (aged 23)	4	0	(Portuguese Football Federation) Leixões
16	MF	Moreto Cassamá	16 February 1998 (aged 23)	12	0	(French Football Federation) Reims
17	FW	Mama Baldé	6 November 1995 (aged 26)	13	1	(French Football Federation) Troyes
18	FW	Piqueti	12 February 1993 (aged 28)	32	7	(Saudi Arabian Football Federation) Al-Shoulla
19	FW	Joseph Mendes	30 March 1991 (aged 30)	13	4	(French Football Federation) Niort
20	MF	Sori Mané	3 April 1996 (aged 25)	16	0	(Portuguese Football Federation) Moreirense
21	DF	Nanu	17 May 1994 (aged 27)	18	0	(Portuguese Football Federation) Porto
22	DF	Opa Sanganté	1 February 1991 (aged 30)	8	0	(French Football Federation) Châteauroux
23	MF	Alfa Semedo	30 August 1997 (aged 24)	8	1	(Portuguese Football Federation) Vitória de Guimarães
24	GK	Manuel Baldé	14 November 2002 (aged 19)	0	0	(Portuguese Football Federation) Vizela

=== Nigeria ===
Interim coach: Augustine Eguavoen

A 28-man final squad was announced on 25 December 2021. On 31 December 2021, Emmanuel Dennis, Victor Osimhen, Leon Balogun, and Shehu Abdullahi withdrew from the squad and were replaced by Semi Ajayi, Tyronne Ebuehi, Peter Olayinka, and Henry Onyekuru. On 6 January 2022, Odion Ighalo withdrawn but remain in the squad, thus reducing the squad to 27 players. Newly appointed coach José Peseiro joined the team as an observer, while interim coach Eguavoen led the team.

No.	Pos.	Player	Date of birth (age)	Caps	Goals	Club
1	GK	Maduka Okoye	28 August 1999 (aged 22)	12	0	(Royal Dutch Football Association) Sparta Rotterdam
2	DF	Ola Aina	8 October 1996 (aged 25)	21	0	(Italian Football Federation) Torino
3	DF	Jamilu Collins	5 August 1994 (aged 27)	23	0	(German Football Association) SC Paderborn
4	MF	Wilfred Ndidi	16 December 1996 (aged 25)	43	0	(The Football Association) Leicester City
5	DF	William Troost-Ekong (captain)	1 September 1993 (aged 28)	52	2	(The Football Association) Watford
6	DF	Semi Ajayi	9 November 1993 (aged 28)	15	0	(The Football Association) West Bromwich Albion
7	FW	Ahmed Musa	14 October 1992 (aged 29)	103	16	(Turkish Football Federation) Fatih Karagümrük
8	MF	Frank Onyeka	1 January 1998 (aged 24)	3	0	(The Football Association) Brentford
9	MF	Odion Ighalo	16 June 1999 (aged 22)	-	-	(Saudi Arabian Football Federation) Al Shabab
10	MF	Joe Aribo	21 July 1996 (aged 25)	11	2	(Scottish Football Association) Rangers
11	FW	Henry Onyekuru	5 June 1997 (aged 24)	15	2	(Hellenic Football Federation) Olympiacos
12	DF	Zaidu Sanusi	13 June 1997 (aged 24)	6	0	(Portuguese Football Federation) Porto
13	MF	Chidera Ejuke	2 January 1998 (aged 24)	6	0	(Russian Football Union) CSKA Moscow
14	FW	Kelechi Iheanacho	3 October 1996 (aged 25)	38	11	(The Football Association) Leicester City
15	FW	Moses Simon	12 July 1995 (aged 26)	42	5	(French Football Federation) Nantes
16	GK	Daniel Akpeyi	3 August 1986 (aged 35)	18	0	(South African Football Association) Kaizer Chiefs
17	FW	Samuel Chukwueze	22 May 1999 (aged 22)	19	3	(Royal Spanish Football Federation) Villarreal
18	MF	Alex Iwobi	3 May 1996 (aged 25)	51	9	(The Football Association) Everton
19	FW	Taiwo Awoniyi	12 August 1997 (aged 24)	1	0	(German Football Association) Union Berlin
20	DF	Chidozie Awaziem	1 January 1997 (aged 25)	24	1	(Turkish Football Federation) Alanyaspor
21	DF	Tyronne Ebuehi	16 December 1995 (aged 26)	10	0	(Italian Football Federation) Venezia
22	DF	Kenneth Omeruo	17 October 1993 (aged 28)	54	1	(Royal Spanish Football Federation) Leganés
23	GK	Francis Uzoho	28 October 1998 (aged 23)	18	0	(Cyprus Football Association) Omonia
24	FW	Umar Sadiq	2 February 1997 (aged 24)	0	0	(Royal Spanish Football Federation) Almería
25	MF	Kelechi Nwakali	5 June 1998 (aged 23)	0	0	(Royal Spanish Football Federation) Huesca
26	DF	Olisa Ndah	21 January 1998 (aged 23)	3	0	(South African Football Association) Orlando Pirates
27	GK	John Noble Barinyima	6 June 1993 (aged 28)	0	0	(Nigeria Football Federation) Enyimba
28	FW	Peter Olayinka	16 November 1995 (aged 26)	2	0	(Football Association of the Czech Republic) Slavia Prague

=== Sudan ===
Head coach: Burhan Tia

A 34-man provisional squad was announced on 27 December 2021. A 28-man final squad was announced on 5 January 2022.

No.	Pos.	Player	Date of birth (age)	Caps	Goals	Club
1	GK	Ali Abu Eshrein	6 December 1989 (aged 32)	21	0	(Sudan Football Association) Al-Hilal Omdurman
2	MF	Muhamed Kesra	25 October 1996 (aged 25)	1	0	(Sudan Football Association) Hay Al-Arab
3	DF	Elsadig Hassan	4 September 1996 (aged 25)	1	0	(Sudan Football Association) Al-Shorta El-Gadarif
4	DF	Amjad Ismail	1 January 1993 (aged 29)	1	0	(Sudan Football Association) Al-Ahly Shendi
5	DF	Salah Nemer (captain)	5 February 1992 (aged 29)	10	0	(Sudan Football Association) Al-Merrikh
6	DF	Mustafa Karshoum	6 December 1992 (aged 29)	3	0	(Sudan Football Association) Al-Merrikh
7	DF	Mohamed Amin	6 November 1998 (aged 23)	1	0	(Swedish Football Association) Motala AIF
8	MF	Mohamed Hossein	18 September 1998 (aged 23)	0	0	(Sudan Football Association) Al-Merrikh
9	MF	Abdel Raouf	18 July 1993 (aged 28)	1	0	(Sudan Football Association) Al-Hilal Omdurman
10	FW	Mohamed Abdelrahman	10 July 1993 (aged 28)	19	7	(Sudan Football Association) Al-Hilal Omdurman
11	MF	Gumaa Abas	3 November 1994 (aged 27)	1	0	(Sudan Football Association) Al-Hilal Omdurman
12	MF	Mustafa Elfadni	24 October 1999 (aged 22)	1	0	(Sudan Football Association) Al-Hilal Omdurman
13	DF	Awad Zaid	1 January 1993 (aged 29)	0	0	(Sudan Football Association) Al-Ahli Khartoum
14	MF	Mohamed Al Rashed	1 June 1994 (aged 27)	13	1	(Sudan Football Association) Al-Merrikh
15	FW	Yasin Hamed	12 September 1999 (aged 22)	6	0	(Hungarian Football Federation) Nyíregyháza Spartacus
16	GK	Ishag Adam	1 January 1999 (aged 23)	1	0	(Sudan Football Association) Al-Hilal Omdurman
17	DF	Mazin Mohamedein	2 May 2000 (aged 21)	1	0	(Sudan Football Association) Tuti SC
18	MF	Sharif Omer	19 June 1992 (aged 29)	0	0	(Sudan Football Association) Hilal Al-Fasher
19	MF	Dhiya Mahjoub	30 May 1995 (aged 26)	16	0	(Sudan Football Association) Al-Merrikh
20	MF	Suliman Zakaria	1 January 1995 (aged 27)	0	0	(Sudan Football Association) Hay Al-Arab
21	MF	Walieldin Khedr	15 September 1995 (aged 26)	18	0	(Sudan Football Association) Al-Hilal Omdurman
22	FW	Al-Jezoli Nouh	24 October 2002 (aged 19)	8	0	(Sudan Football Association) Al-Merrikh
23	GK	Mohamed Mustafa	19 February 1996 (aged 25)	3	0	(Sudan Football Association) Al-Merrikh
24	MF	Captain Bashir	1 June 1994 (aged 27)	1	0	(Sudan Football Association) Alamal Atbara
25	FW	Musab Ahmed	10 December 1993 (aged 28)	1	0	(Sudan Football Association) El Hilal El Obeid
26	MF	Alsheikh Muhamed	14 June 1997 (aged 24)	0	0	(Sudan Football Association) Khartoum NC
27	MF	Muhamed Almunzer	13 October 2000 (aged 21)	0	0	(Sudan Football Association) El Hilal El Obeid
28	DF	Moaiad Abdeen	21 May 1996 (aged 25)	3	0	(Sudan Football Association) Alamal Atbara

== Group E ==
=== Algeria ===
Head coach: Djamel Belmadi

A 28-man final squad was announced on 24 December 2021.

No.	Pos.	Player	Date of birth (age)	Caps	Goals	Club
1	GK	Moustapha Zeghba	21 November 1990 (aged 31)	1	0	(Saudi Arabian Football Federation) Damac
2	DF	Aïssa Mandi	22 October 1991 (aged 30)	67	3	(Royal Spanish Football Federation) Villarreal
3	DF	Mehdi Tahrat	24 January 1990 (aged 31)	15	0	(Qatar Football Association) Al-Gharafa
4	DF	Djamel Benlamri	25 December 1989 (aged 32)	28	2	(Qatar Football Association) Qatar SC
5	DF	Mohamed Amine Tougai	22 January 2000 (aged 21)	4	1	(Tunisian Football Federation) Espérance de Tunis
6	MF	Ramiz Zerrouki	26 May 1998 (aged 23)	8	1	(Royal Dutch Football Association) Twente
7	FW	Riyad Mahrez (captain)	21 February 1991 (aged 30)	70	26	(The Football Association) Manchester City
8	FW	Youcef Belaïli	14 March 1992 (aged 29)	30	8	Unattached
9	FW	Baghdad Bounedjah	24 November 1991 (aged 30)	52	24	(Qatar Football Association) Al Sadd
10	MF	Sofiane Feghouli	26 December 1989 (aged 32)	73	20	(Turkish Football Federation) Galatasaray
11	MF	Yacine Brahimi	8 February 1990 (aged 31)	62	14	(Qatar Football Association) Al-Rayyan
12	MF	Haris Belkebla	28 January 1994 (aged 27)	9	0	(French Football Federation) Brest
13	FW	Islam Slimani	18 June 1988 (aged 33)	80	39	(French Football Federation) Lyon
14	MF	Sofiane Bendebka	9 August 1992 (aged 29)	6	1	(Saudi Arabian Football Federation) Al-Fateh
15	MF	Farid Boulaya	25 February 1993 (aged 28)	4	1	(French Football Federation) Metz
16	GK	Alexandre Oukidja	19 July 1988 (aged 33)	6	0	(French Football Federation) Metz
17	DF	Abdelkader Bedrane	2 April 1992 (aged 29)	10	0	(Tunisian Football Federation) Espérance de Tunis
18	FW	Adam Ounas	11 November 1996 (aged 25)	15	4	(Italian Football Federation) Napoli
19	MF	Adem Zorgane	6 January 2000 (aged 22)	4	0	(Royal Belgian Football Association) Charleroi
20	DF	Youcef Atal	17 May 1996 (aged 25)	22	1	(French Football Federation) Nice
21	DF	Ramy Bensebaini	16 April 1995 (aged 26)	41	5	(German Football Association) Borussia Mönchengladbach
22	MF	Ismaël Bennacer	1 December 1997 (aged 24)	31	2	(Italian Football Federation) Milan
23	GK	Raïs M'Bolhi	25 April 1986 (aged 35)	83	0	(Saudi Arabian Football Federation) Al-Ettifaq
24	DF	Ilyes Chetti	22 January 1995 (aged 26)	8	0	(Tunisian Football Federation) Espérance de Tunis
25	DF	Houcine Benayada	8 August 1992 (aged 29)	10	0	(Tunisian Football Federation) Étoile du Sahel
26	FW	Mohamed El Amine Amoura	9 May 2000 (aged 21)	4	4	(Swiss Football Association) Lugano
27	FW	Saïd Benrahma	10 August 1995 (aged 26)	14	1	(The Football Association) West Ham United
28	DF	Réda Halaïmia	28 August 1996 (aged 25)	6	0	(Royal Belgian Football Association) Beerschot

=== Equatorial Guinea ===
Head coach: Juan Michá

A 28-man final squad was announced on 27 December 2021. On 4 January 2022, Aitor Embela withdrew due to injury and was replaced by Felipe Ovono.

No.	Pos.	Player	Date of birth (age)	Caps	Goals	Club
1	GK	Jesús Owono	1 March 2001 (aged 20)	10	0	(Royal Spanish Football Federation) Alavés
2	DF	Miguel Ángel Mayé	8 December 1995 (aged 26)	10	0	(Equatoguinean Football Federation) Futuro Kings
3	DF	Marvin Anieboh	26 August 1997 (aged 24)	7	0	(Royal Spanish Football Federation) Cacereño
4	MF	Federico Bikoro	17 March 1996 (aged 25)	32	2	(Royal Spanish Football Federation) Hércules
5	DF	Cosme Anvene	3 March 1990 (aged 31)	11	0	(Equatoguinean Football Federation) Deportivo Unidad
6	FW	Iban Salvador	11 December 1995 (aged 26)	27	4	(Royal Spanish Football Federation) Fuenlabrada
7	MF	Rubén Belima	11 February 1992 (aged 29)	26	0	(Royal Spanish Football Federation) Hércules
8	MF	José Machín	14 August 1996 (aged 25)	15	0	(Italian Football Federation) Monza
9	FW	Óscar Siafá	12 September 1997 (aged 24)	5	0	(Hellenic Football Federation) Olympiacos Volos
10	FW	Emilio Nsue (captain)	30 September 1989 (aged 32)	28	13	Unattached
11	DF	Basilio Ndong	17 January 1999 (aged 22)	23	0	(Norwegian Football Federation) Start
12	GK	Mariano Mba	3 August 1999 (aged 22)	0	0	(Equatoguinean Football Federation) Deportivo Unidad
13	GK	Manuel Sapunga	23 November 1992 (aged 29)	0	0	(Equatoguinean Football Federation) Futuro Kings
14	MF	Jannick Buyla	6 October 1998 (aged 23)	8	0	(Royal Spanish Football Federation) Gimnàstic
15	DF	Carlos Akapo	12 March 1993 (aged 28)	23	1	(Royal Spanish Football Federation) Cádiz
16	DF	Saúl Coco	9 February 1999 (aged 22)	9	2	(Royal Spanish Football Federation) Las Palmas
17	MF	Josete Miranda	22 July 1998 (aged 23)	25	2	(Hellenic Football Federation) Niki Volos
18	FW	Dorian Jr.	12 May 2001 (aged 20)	1	0	(Royal Spanish Football Federation) Langreo
19	FW	Luis Nlavo	9 July 2001 (aged 20)	7	2	(Portuguese Football Federation) Braga
20	MF	Santiago Eneme	29 September 2000 (aged 21)	7	0	(French Football Federation) Nantes
21	DF	Esteban Obiang	7 May 1998 (aged 23)	11	0	(Royal Spanish Football Federation) Antequera
22	MF	Pablo Ganet	4 November 1994 (aged 27)	26	3	(Royal Spanish Football Federation) Murcia
23	DF	Luis Meseguer	7 September 1999 (aged 22)	13	1	(Royal Spanish Football Federation) Navalcarnero
24	MF	Álex Balboa	6 March 2001 (aged 20)	4	0	(Royal Spanish Football Federation) Alavés
25	GK	Felipe Ovono	26 July 1993 (aged 28)	40	0	(Equatoguinean Football Federation) Futuro Kings
26	MF	Javier Akapo	3 September 1996 (aged 25)	1	0	(Royal Spanish Football Federation) Ibiza Islas Pitiusas
27	FW	Pedro Oba Asu	18 May 2000 (aged 21)	11	4	(Equatoguinean Football Federation) Futuro Kings
28	DF	Luis Enrique Nsue	16 January 1998 (aged 23)	1	0	(Equatoguinean Football Federation) Cano Sport

=== Ivory Coast ===
Head coach: (France) Patrice Beaumelle

A 28-man final squad was announced on 23 December 2021. On 31 December 2021, Sylvain Gbohouo was temporarily banned by FIFA, due to being found guilty of taking the prohibited substance trimetazidine and could not participate. A few days later, N'Drin Ulrich Edan was called up to replace him.

No.	Pos.	Player	Date of birth (age)	Caps	Goals	Club
1	GK	Ira Eliezer Tapé	31 August 1997 (aged 24)	2	0	(Ivorian Football Federation) San Pédro
2	FW	Karim Konaté	21 March 2004 (aged 17)	1	0	(Ivorian Football Federation) ASEC Mimosas
3	DF	Ghislain Konan	27 December 1995 (aged 26)	13	0	(French Football Federation) Reims
4	MF	Jean Michaël Seri	19 July 1991 (aged 30)	34	4	(The Football Association) Fulham
5	DF	Wilfried Kanon	6 July 1993 (aged 28)	52	3	(Egyptian Football Association) Pyramids
6	DF	Willy Boly	3 February 1991 (aged 30)	10	1	(The Football Association) Wolverhampton Wanderers
7	DF	Odilon Kossounou	4 January 2001 (aged 21)	11	0	(German Football Association) Bayer Leverkusen
8	MF	Franck Kessié	19 December 1996 (aged 25)	52	5	(Italian Football Federation) Milan
9	FW	Wilfried Zaha	10 November 1992 (aged 29)	21	5	(The Football Association) Crystal Palace
10	FW	Jean Evrard Kouassi	25 September 1994 (aged 27)	6	1	(Chinese Football Association) Wuhan
11	MF	Maxwel Cornet	27 September 1996 (aged 25)	24	5	(The Football Association) Burnley
12	MF	Habib Maïga	1 June 1996 (aged 25)	10	0	(French Football Federation) Metz
13	FW	Jérémie Boga	3 January 1997 (aged 25)	7	1	(Italian Football Federation) Sassuolo
14	DF	Simon Deli	27 October 1991 (aged 30)	19	0	(Turkish Football Federation) Adana Demirspor
15	FW	Max Gradel	30 November 1987 (aged 34)	91	15	(Turkish Football Federation) Sivasspor
16	GK	N'Drin Ulrich Edan	19 October 1992 (aged 29)	0	0	(Ivorian Football Federation) AFAD
17	DF	Serge Aurier (captain)	24 December 1992 (aged 29)	74	3	(Royal Spanish Football Federation) Villarreal
18	MF	Ibrahim Sangaré	2 December 1997 (aged 24)	17	3	(Royal Dutch Football Association) PSV Eindhoven
19	FW	Nicolas Pépé	20 May 1995 (aged 26)	28	6	(The Football Association) Arsenal
20	MF	Serey Dié	7 November 1984 (aged 37)	55	2	(Swiss Football Association) Sion
21	DF	Eric Bailly	12 April 1994 (aged 27)	41	2	(The Football Association) Manchester United
22	FW	Sébastien Haller	22 June 1994 (aged 27)	8	3	(Royal Dutch Football Association) Ajax
23	GK	Badra Ali Sangaré	30 May 1986 (aged 35)	17	0	(South African Football Association) JDR Stars
24	FW	Christian Kouamé	6 December 1997 (aged 24)	7	0	(Royal Belgian Football Association) Anderlecht
25	MF	Hamed Traorè	16 February 2000 (aged 21)	3	0	(Italian Football Federation) Sassuolo
26	GK	Abdoul Karim Cissé	20 October 1985 (aged 36)	6	0	(Ivorian Football Federation) ASEC Mimosas
27	MF	Jean-Daniel Akpa Akpro	11 October 1992 (aged 29)	17	0	(Italian Football Federation) Lazio
28	FW	Yohan Boli	17 September 1993 (aged 28)	11	0	(Qatar Football Association) Al-Rayyan

=== Sierra Leone ===
Head coach: John Keister

A 40-man provisional squad was announced on 21 December 2021. A 28-man final squad was announced on 31 December 2021. On 8 January 2022, Alhassan Koroma withdrew due to injury and was replaced by Augustus Kargbo.

No.	Pos.	Player	Date of birth (age)	Caps	Goals	Club
1	GK	Mohamed Nbalie Kamara	29 April 1999 (aged 22)	9	0	(Sierra Leone Football Association) East End Lions
2	DF	Osman Kakay	25 August 1997 (aged 24)	6	0	(The Football Association) Queens Park Rangers
3	DF	Kevin Wright	28 December 1995 (aged 26)	3	0	(Swedish Football Association) Örebro SK
4	MF	Medo	16 November 1987 (aged 34)	33	2	Unattached
5	DF	Steven Caulker	29 December 1991 (aged 30)	0	0	(Turkish Football Federation) Gaziantep
6	MF	John Kamara	12 May 1988 (aged 33)	18	1	Unattached
7	MF	Kwame Quee	9 July 1996 (aged 25)	20	3	(Football Association of Iceland) Víkingur Reykjavík
8	MF	Saidu Fofanah	14 September 1997 (aged 24)	5	1	(Sierra Leone Football Association) Kallon
9	FW	Augustine Williams	3 August 1997 (aged 24)	1	0	Unattached
10	FW	Kei Kamara	1 September 1984 (aged 37)	35	7	(Football Association of Finland) HIFK
11	FW	Sullay Kaikai	26 August 1995 (aged 26)	4	1	(The Football Association) Wycombe Wanderers
12	FW	Alhaji Kamara	16 April 1994 (aged 27)	7	5	(Danish Football Association) Randers
13	FW	Augustus Kargbo	24 August 1999 (aged 22)	2	0	(Italian Football Federation) Crotone
14	FW	Mohamed Buya Turay	10 January 1995 (aged 26)	6	0	(Chinese Football Association) Henan Songshan Longmen
15	DF	Yeami Dunia	16 December 1996 (aged 25)	25	0	(Sierra Leone Football Association) Bo Rangers
16	GK	Ibrahim Sesay	18 October 2004 (aged 17)	1	0	(Sierra Leone Football Association) Bo Rangers
17	DF	Umaru Bangura (captain)	7 October 1987 (aged 34)	46	4	(Swiss Football Association) Neuchâtel Xamax
18	DF	David Sesay	18 September 1998 (aged 23)	2	0	(The Football Association) Wealdstone
19	FW	Mustapha Bundu	27 February 1997 (aged 24)	6	1	(Danish Football Association) AGF
20	DF	Saidu Mansaray	21 February 2001 (aged 20)	4	0	(Sierra Leone Football Association) Bo Rangers
21	MF	Idris Kanu	5 December 1999 (aged 22)	1	0	(The Football Association) Peterborough United
22	MF	Issa Kallon	3 January 1996 (aged 26)	0	0	(Royal Dutch Football Association) Cambuur
23	GK	Isaac Caulker	25 January 1991 (aged 30)	0	0	(Sierra Leone Football Association) Kallon
24	MF	Prince Barrie	18 August 1997 (aged 24)	7	0	(Sierra Leone Football Association) Bo Rangers
25	DF	Daniel Francis	10 July 2002 (aged 19)	2	0	(German Football Association) Rot Weiss Ahlen
26	MF	Saidu Bah Kamara	3 March 2002 (aged 19)	0	0	(Sierra Leone Football Association) Bo Rangers
27	MF	Abu Dumbuya	29 January 1999 (aged 22)	6	0	(Sierra Leone Football Association) East End Lions
28	FW	Musa Noah Kamara	6 August 2000 (aged 21)	4	0	Unattached

== Group F ==
=== Gambia ===
Head coach: (Belgium) Tom Saintfiet

A 40-man provisional squad was announced on 11 December 2021. A 28-man final squad was announced on 21 December 2021.

No.	Pos.	Player	Date of birth (age)	Caps	Goals	Club
1	GK	Modou Jobe	27 October 1988 (aged 33)	26	0	(South African Football Association) Black Leopards
2	MF	Yusupha Bobb	22 June 1996 (aged 25)	10	0	(Italian Football Federation) Piacenza
3	FW	Ablie Jallow	14 November 1998 (aged 23)	16	3	(Royal Belgian Football Association) Seraing
4	MF	Dawda Ngum	2 September 1990 (aged 31)	18	0	Unattached
5	DF	Omar Colley	24 October 1992 (aged 29)	32	0	(Italian Football Federation) Sampdoria
6	MF	Sulayman Marreh	15 January 1996 (aged 25)	24	1	(Royal Belgian Football Association) Gent
7	FW	Lamin Jallow	22 July 1994 (aged 27)	17	1	(Hungarian Football Federation) Fehérvár
8	MF	Ebrima Darboe	6 June 2001 (aged 20)	6	0	(Italian Football Federation) Roma
9	FW	Assan Ceesay	17 March 1994 (aged 27)	23	11	(Swiss Football Association) Zürich
10	FW	Musa Barrow	14 November 1998 (aged 23)	17	2	(Italian Football Federation) Bologna
11	FW	Modou Barrow	13 October 1992 (aged 29)	12	2	(Korea Football Association) Jeonbuk Hyundai Motors
12	DF	James Gomez	14 November 2001 (aged 20)	4	1	(Danish Football Association) Horsens
13	DF	Pa Modou Jagne (captain)	26 December 1989 (aged 32)	38	2	(Swiss Football Association) Dietikon
14	DF	Noah Sonko Sundberg	6 June 1996 (aged 25)	6	0	(Bulgarian Football Union) Levski Sofia
15	MF	Ebrima Sohna	14 December 1988 (aged 33)	37	3	(Gambia Football Federation) Fortune
16	DF	Mohammed Mbye	18 June 1989 (aged 32)	13	0	(Swedish Football Association) Ifö Bromölla IF
17	FW	Bubacarr Jobe	21 November 1994 (aged 27)	11	3	(Swedish Football Association) Norrby IF
18	GK	Baboucarr Gaye	24 February 1998 (aged 23)	5	0	(German Football Association) Rot-Weiß Koblenz
19	FW	Ebrima Colley	1 February 2000 (aged 21)	10	0	(Italian Football Federation) Spezia
20	FW	Bubacarr Trawally	10 November 1994 (aged 27)	14	0	(United Arab Emirates Football Association) Ajman
21	DF	Saidy Janko	22 October 1995 (aged 26)	3	0	(Royal Spanish Football Federation) Valladolid
22	GK	Sheikh Sibi	21 February 1998 (aged 23)	3	0	(Italian Football Federation) Virtus Verona
23	FW	Muhammed Badamosi	27 December 1998 (aged 23)	10	1	(Royal Belgian Football Association) Kortrijk
24	FW	Dembo Darboe	17 August 1998 (aged 23)	2	0	(Football Federation of Belarus) Shakhtyor Soligorsk
25	DF	Bubacarr Sanneh	14 November 1994 (aged 27)	26	1	Unattached
26	DF	Ibou Touray	24 December 1994 (aged 27)	7	0	(The Football Association) Salford City
27	FW	Yusupha Njie	3 January 1994 (aged 28)	2	0	(Portuguese Football Federation) Boavista
28	MF	Ebou Adams	15 January 1996 (aged 25)	8	0	(The Football Association) Forest Green Rovers

=== Mali ===
Head coach: Mohamed Magassouba

A 28-man final squad was announced on 27 December 2021.

No.	Pos.	Player	Date of birth (age)	Caps	Goals	Club
1	GK	Ibrahim Mounkoro	23 February 1990 (aged 31)	8	0	(Congolese Association Football Federation) TP Mazembe
2	DF	Hamari Traoré (captain)	27 January 1992 (aged 29)	36	1	(French Football Federation) Rennes
3	DF	Charles Traoré	1 January 1992 (aged 30)	8	0	(French Football Federation) Nantes
4	MF	Amadou Haidara	31 January 1998 (aged 23)	21	2	(German Football Association) RB Leipzig
5	DF	Boubakar Kouyaté	15 April 1997 (aged 24)	10	0	(French Football Federation) Metz
6	DF	Massadio Haïdara	2 December 1992 (aged 29)	7	0	(French Football Federation) Lens
7	FW	Moussa Doumbia	15 August 1994 (aged 27)	30	5	(French Football Federation) Reims
8	MF	Diadie Samassékou	11 January 1996 (aged 25)	21	1	(German Football Association) 1899 Hoffenheim
9	FW	El Bilal Touré	7 October 1996 (aged 25)	9	2	(French Football Federation) Reims
10	FW	Kalifa Coulibaly	21 August 1991 (aged 30)	26	5	(French Football Federation) Nantes
11	MF	Lassana Coulibaly	10 April 1996 (aged 25)	26	0	(Italian Football Federation) Salernitana
12	DF	Moussa Sissako	10 November 2000 (aged 21)	2	0	(Royal Belgian Football Association) Standard Liège
13	DF	Senou Coulibaly	4 September 1994 (aged 27)	3	0	(French Football Federation) Dijon
14	FW	Adama Malouda Traoré	5 June 1995 (aged 26)	41	8	(Moldovan Football Federation) Sheriff Tiraspol
15	DF	Mamadou Fofana	21 January 1998 (aged 23)	22	2	(French Football Federation) Amiens
16	GK	Djigui Diarra	27 February 1995 (aged 26)	48	0	(Tanzania Football Federation) Young Africans
17	DF	Falaye Sacko	1 May 1995 (aged 26)	22	1	(Portuguese Football Federation) Vitória de Guimarães
18	FW	Ibrahima Koné	16 June 1999 (aged 22)	6	8	(Norwegian Football Federation) Sarpsborg 08
19	FW	Moussa Djenepo	15 June 1998 (aged 23)	21	3	(The Football Association) Southampton
20	MF	Yves Bissouma	30 August 1996 (aged 25)	19	3	(The Football Association) Brighton & Hove Albion
21	MF	Adama Noss Traoré	28 June 1995 (aged 26)	23	3	(Turkish Football Federation) Hatayspor
22	GK	Ismael Diawara	11 November 1994 (aged 27)	1	0	(Swedish Football Association) Malmö FF
23	MF	Aliou Dieng	16 October 1997 (aged 24)	19	1	(Egyptian Football Association) Al Ahly
24	DF	Issaka Samaké	20 October 1994 (aged 27)	18	2	(Guinean Football Federation) Horoya
25	FW	Lassine Sinayoko	8 December 1999 (aged 22)	4	0	(French Football Federation) Auxerre
26	MF	Mohamed Camara	6 January 2000 (aged 22)	7	1	(Austrian Football Association) Red Bull Salzburg
27	MF	Rominigue Kouamé	7 December 1996 (aged 25)	10	0	(French Football Federation) Troyes
28	MF	Hamidou Traoré	7 October 1996 (aged 25)	1	0	(Turkish Football Federation) Giresunspor

=== Mauritania ===
Head coach: (France) Didier Gomes Da Rosa

A 30-man provisional squad was announced on 23 December 2021. A 28-man final squad was announced on 31 December 2021.

No.	Pos.	Player	Date of birth (age)	Caps	Goals	Club
1	GK	M'Backé N'Diaye	19 December 1994 (aged 27)	2	0	(Football Federation of the Islamic Republic of Mauritania) Nouakchott Kings
2	DF	Souleymane Karamoko	29 July 1992 (aged 29)	0	0	(French Football Federation) Nancy
3	DF	Aly Abeid	11 December 1997 (aged 24)	41	2	(French Football Federation) Valenciennes
4	DF	Harouna Abou Demba	31 December 1991 (aged 30)	15	0	Unattached
5	DF	Abdoul Ba (captain)	8 February 1994 (aged 27)	48	0	(Libyan Football Federation) Al-Ahli Tripoli
6	MF	Khassa Camara	22 October 1992 (aged 29)	43	2	(All India Football Federation) NorthEast United
7	FW	Idrissa Thiam	2 September 2000 (aged 21)	2	0	(Football Federation of the Islamic Republic of Mauritania) ASAC Concorde
8	MF	Guessouma Fofana	17 December 1992 (aged 29)	4	0	(Romanian Football Federation) CFR Cluj
9	FW	Hemeya Tanjy	1 May 1998 (aged 23)	22	2	(Football Federation of the Islamic Republic of Mauritania) Nouadhibou
10	FW	Adama Ba	27 August 1993 (aged 28)	40	6	(Royal Moroccan Football Federation) RS Berkane
11	FW	Oumar Camara	19 August 1992 (aged 29)	5	0	(Bulgarian Football Union) Beroe Stara Zagora
12	MF	Almike N'Diaye	26 October 1996 (aged 25)	7	1	(French Football Federation) GOAL FC
13	DF	Diadié Diarra	23 January 1993 (aged 28)	10	0	(French Football Federation) GOAL FC
14	MF	Mohamed Dellahi Yali	1 November 1997 (aged 24)	49	2	(Libyan Football Federation) Al-Nasr Benghazi
15	DF	Souleymane Doukara	29 September 1991 (aged 30)	0	0	(Turkish Football Federation) Giresunspor
16	GK	Mohamed El Mokhtar	10 October 2002 (aged 19)	0	0	(Football Federation of the Islamic Republic of Mauritania) Douanes
17	MF	Abdallahi Mahmoud	4 May 2000 (aged 21)	13	0	(Croatian Football Federation) Istra 1961
18	MF	Bodda Mouhsine	18 June 1994 (aged 27)	11	0	(Football Federation of the Islamic Republic of Mauritania) Nouadhibou
19	FW	Ibréhima Coulibaly	30 August 1989 (aged 32)	13	0	(French Football Federation) Le Mans
20	DF	Houssen Abderrahmane	3 February 1995 (aged 26)	13	0	(Royal Belgian Football Association) Francs Borains
21	DF	Hassan Houbeib	31 October 1993 (aged 28)	4	0	(Iraq Football Association) Al-Zawraa
22	GK	Babacar Diop	17 September 1995 (aged 26)	5	0	(Football Federation of the Islamic Republic of Mauritania) Nouadhibou
23	MF	Mouhamed Soueid	31 December 1991 (aged 30)	6	0	(Football Federation of the Islamic Republic of Mauritania) Nouadhibou
24	MF	Yacoub Sidi Ethmane	10 December 1995 (aged 26)	6	1	(Congolese Association Football Federation) AS Vita
25	FW	Pape Ibnou Ba	5 January 1993 (aged 29)	0	0	(French Football Federation) Le Havre
26	MF	Beyatt Lekweiry	11 April 2005 (aged 16)	0	0	(Football Federation of the Islamic Republic of Mauritania) Douanes
27	FW	Aboubakar Kamara	7 March 1995 (aged 26)	5	1	(Hellenic Football Federation) Aris
28	MF	Abdoulkader Thiam	3 October 1998 (aged 23)	8	0	(French Football Federation) Boulogne

=== Tunisia ===
Head coach: Mondher Kebaier

A 28-man final squad was announced on 30 December 2021. On 4 January 2022, it was announced that Youssef Msakni and Seifeddine Jaziri tested positive for COVID-19, but the Tunisian Football Federation were not allowed to replace them ahead of the tournament. On 5 January 2022, Firas Ben Larbi withdrew due to injury and was replaced by Issam Jebali.

No.	Pos.	Player	Date of birth (age)	Caps	Goals	Club
1	GK	Farouk Ben Mustapha	1 July 1989 (aged 32)	43	0	(Tunisian Football Federation) Espérance de Tunis
2	DF	Bilel Ifa	9 March 1990 (aged 31)	26	0	(Tunisian Football Federation) Club Africain
3	DF	Montassar Talbi	26 May 1998 (aged 23)	10	0	(Russian Football Union) Rubin Kazan
4	DF	Omar Rekik	20 December 2001 (aged 20)	1	0	(The Football Association) Arsenal
5	DF	Oussama Haddadi	28 January 1992 (aged 29)	27	0	(Turkish Football Federation) Yeni Malatyaspor
6	DF	Dylan Bronn	19 June 1995 (aged 26)	33	2	(French Football Federation) Metz
7	FW	Youssef Msakni (captain)	28 October 1990 (aged 31)	77	14	(Qatar Football Association) Al-Arabi
8	MF	Saîf-Eddine Khaoui	27 April 1995 (aged 26)	24	4	(French Football Federation) Clermont
9	FW	Yoann Touzghar	28 November 1986 (aged 35)	5	1	(French Football Federation) Troyes
10	FW	Wahbi Khazri	8 February 1991 (aged 30)	65	22	(French Football Federation) Saint-Étienne
11	FW	Seifeddine Jaziri	12 February 1993 (aged 28)	18	8	(Egyptian Football Association) Zamalek
12	DF	Ali Maâloul	1 January 1990 (aged 32)	74	2	(Egyptian Football Association) Al Ahly
13	DF	Ali Abdi	20 December 1993 (aged 28)	4	0	(French Football Federation) Caen
14	MF	Hannibal Mejbri	21 January 2003 (aged 18)	9	0	(The Football Association) Manchester United
15	MF	Mohamed Ali Ben Romdhane	6 September 1999 (aged 22)	15	0	(Tunisian Football Federation) Espérance de Tunis
16	GK	Aymen Dahmen	28 January 1997 (aged 24)	1	0	(Tunisian Football Federation) CS Sfaxien
17	MF	Ellyes Skhiri	10 May 1995 (aged 26)	40	3	(German Football Association) 1. FC Köln
18	MF	Ghailene Chaalali	28 February 1994 (aged 27)	25	1	(Tunisian Football Federation) Espérance de Tunis
19	MF	Hamza Rafia	22 April 1999 (aged 22)	15	0	(Royal Belgian Football Association) Standard Liège
20	DF	Mohamed Dräger	25 June 1996 (aged 25)	24	3	(The Football Association) Nottingham Forest
21	DF	Hamza Mathlouthi	25 July 1992 (aged 29)	34	0	(Egyptian Football Association) Zamalek
22	GK	Bechir Ben Saïd	29 November 1992 (aged 29)	0	0	(Tunisian Football Federation) US Monastir
23	FW	Naïm Sliti	27 July 1992 (aged 29)	59	12	(Saudi Arabian Football Federation) Al-Ettifaq
24	DF	Mohamed Amine Ben Hamida	15 December 1995 (aged 26)	6	0	(Tunisian Football Federation) Espérance de Tunis
25	MF	Anis Ben Slimane	16 March 2001 (aged 20)	14	4	(Danish Football Association) Brøndby
26	GK	Ali Jemal	9 June 1990 (aged 31)	0	0	(Tunisian Football Federation) Étoile du Sahel
27	FW	Issam Jebali	25 December 1991 (aged 30)	3	0	(Danish Football Association) OB
28	MF	Aïssa Laïdouni	13 December 1996 (aged 25)	11	1	(Hungarian Football Federation) Ferencváros

== Player representation ==
=== By age ===
- Oldest: (Cape Verde) Marco Soares (37 years, 167 days)
- Youngest: (Mauritania) Beyatt Lekweiry (16 years, 233 days)

==== Goalkeepers ====
- Oldest: (Ivory Coast) Abdoul Karim Cissé (36 years, 41 days)
- Youngest: (Sierra Leone) Ibrahim Sesay (17 years, 43 days)

==== Captains ====
- Oldest: (Comoros) Jimmy Abdou (37 years, 140 days)
- Youngest: (Guinea) Naby Keïta (26 years, 293 days)

=== By club ===
Clubs with 5 or more players represented are listed.

Players	Club
9	(Egypt) Zamalek
8	(Egypt) Al Ahly, (Sudan) Al-Hilal Omdurman
7	(France) Metz, (Sudan) Al-Merrikh, (Tunisia) Espérance de Tunis
6	(Ethiopia) Fasil Kenema, (Guinea) Horoya
5	(Belgium) Standard Liège, (Egypt) Pyramids, (England) Arsenal, (Ethiopia) Saint George, (France) Nantes, (France) Saint-Étienne, (Greece) Olympiacos, (Malawi) Silver Strikers, (Mauritania) Nouadhibou, (Sierra Leone) Bo Rangers

=== By club nationality ===
Players	CAF clubs
31	Egypt
27	Sudan
27	Ethiopia
17	Malawi, South Africa
12	Tunisia
10	Morocco
9	Mauritania, Sierra Leone
7	Equatorial Guinea, Guinea
6	Zimbabwe
5	Ghana, Tanzania
4	(Democratic Republic of the Congo) DR Congo, Ivory Coast
3	Burkina Faso, Libya
2	Nigeria, Zambia
1	Algeria, Cape Verde, (The Gambia) Gambia, Mozambique, Senegal

Players	Clubs outside CAF
105	France
52	England
29	Spain
27	Belgium
25	Italy
21	Portugal
20	Turkey
16	Germany
15	Netherlands
13	Switzerland
10	Greece, Saudi Arabia
9	Cyprus
8	Qatar
7	Sweden
6	Hungary, United States
5	Denmark, Norway
4	Bulgaria, China, Russia
3	Croatia, Moldova, Scotland, United Arab Emirates
2	Austria, Azerbaijan, (Georgia (country)) Georgia, Iceland, Israel, Serbia
1	Armenia, Belarus, Czech Republic, Finland, India, Iraq, (Republic of Ireland) Ireland, Kazakhstan, Kuwait, Luxembourg, Malta, Poland, Slovenia, South Korea

==== By club confederation ====
Players	Clubs
407	UEFA
210	CAF
29	AFC
6	CONCACAF
0	CONMEBOL
0	OFC

=== By representatives of domestic league ===
National squad	Players
Sudan	26
Ethiopia	25
Egypt	22
Malawi	17
Sierra Leone	9
Mauritania	8
Tunisia	8
Equatorial Guinea	7
Zimbabwe	6
Ghana	5
Guinea	4
Ivory Coast	4
Burkina Faso	3
Morocco	2
Cape Verde	1
Gambia	1
Nigeria	1
Senegal	1
Algeria	0
Cameroon	0
Comoros	0
Gabon	0
Guinea-Bissau	0
Mali	0
