= Saidu (name) =

Saidu is a given name and surname. Notable people with the name include:

== Given name ==
- Saidu Musa Abdullahi (born 1979), Nigerian politician
- Saidu Adeshina (born 1983), Nigerian footballer
- Saidu Baba (1794–1877), Emir of Swat
- Saidu Ayodele Balogun (born 20 April 1941), Nigerian general and politician
- Saidu Barda, Nigerian politician
- Saidu Dansadau (born 1953), Nigerian politician
- Saidu Fofanah (born 1997), Sierra Leonean footballer
- Saidu Bah Kamara (born 2002), Sierra Leonean footballer
- Saidu Kargbo (born 1982), Sierra Leonean boxer
- Saidu Kumo (1959–2020), Nigerian politician
- Saidu Mansaray (born 2001), Sierra Leonean footballer
- Saidu Namaska (1937–2021), Nigerian ruler of the Kontagora Emirate
- Saidu Samaila Sambawa, Nigerian politician

== Surname ==
- Dominic Saidu (born 1950), Liberian sprinter
- Suleiman Saidu (born 1938), Nigerian Navy Rear Admiral
