= Mapisa =

Mapisa is a surname. Notable people with the surname include:

- Martin Mapisa, Zimbabwean footballer
- Nosiviwe Mapisa-Nqakula, South African politician
