= 2019 Super League of Malawi =

Football season in Malawi

Super League of Malawi
- Season: 2019
- Dates: 13 April – 22 December
- Champions: Nyasa Big Bullets
- Relegated: Dwangwa United; Mlatho Mponela; Master Security Rangers
- Matches: 240
- Goals: 565 (2.35 per match)
- Top goalscorer: Khuda Muyaba (21 goals)

The 2019 Super League of Malawi (known as the TNM Super League for sponsorship reasons) was the 34th season of the Super League of Malawi, the top professional league for association football clubs in Malawi since its establishment in 1986. It started on 13 April 2019 and ended on 22 December 2019. Nyasa Big Bullets were the defending champions of the previous season. Nyasa Big Bullets have been crowned the Super League champions for the second consecutive season following a 2–0 victory over TN Stars in the last round.

== Teams ==
Sixteen teams competed in the league – the top thirteen teams from the previous season and the three promoted teams as winners of the regional leagues: Ntopwa (Southern Region Football League), Mlatho Mponela (Central Region Football League) and Chitipa United (Northern Region Football League).

== League table ==
Pos	Team	Pld	W	D	L	GF	GA	GD	Pts	Qualification or relegation
1	Nyasa Big Bullets (C)	30	21	7	2	62	13	+49	70	Qualification for CAF Champions League
2	Be Forward Wanderers	30	21	6	3	55	15	+40	69	
3	Blue Eagles (Q)	30	15	8	7	48	34	+14	53	Qualification for CAF Confederation Cup (Note: Blue Eagles are 2019 FISD Challenge Cup winners.)
4	Silver Strikers	30	15	8	7	40	28	+12	53	
5	Civil Service United	30	13	5	12	38	32	+6	44	
6	Moyale Barracks	30	11	9	10	32	31	+1	42	
7	Kamuzu Barracks	30	11	9	10	22	22	0	42	
8	Thomas Nyirenda Stars	30	12	5	13	31	40	−9	41	
9	Mighty Tigers	30	10	8	12	24	24	0	38	
10	Karonga United	30	10	7	13	36	45	−9	37	
11	Ntopwa	30	11	2	17	41	48	−7	35	
12	Mzuni	30	7	11	12	27	37	−10	32	
13	Chitipa United	30	7	11	12	31	47	−16	32	
14	Dwangwa United (R)	30	8	6	16	31	52	−21	30	Relegation
15	Mlatho Mponela (R)	30	5	8	17	25	45	−20	23	Relegation
16	Master Security Rangers (R)	30	4	8	18	22	52	−30	20	Relegation

Source: Soccerway
Rules for classification: 1) points; 2) goal difference; 3) goals scored.
(C) Champions; (Q) Qualified for the phase indicated; (R) Relegated

== Top scorers ==
As of 23 December 2019

Rank	Player	Club	Goals
1	(Malawi) Khuda Muyaba	Silver Strikers	19
2	(Malawi) Hassan Kajoke	Nyasa Big Bullets	17
3	(Nigeria) Babatunde Adepoju	Be Forward Wanderers	15
4	(Malawi) Micium Mhone	Blue Eagles	12
4	(Malawi) Stain Davie	TN Stars	12
5	(Malawi) Collen Nkhulambe	Mzuni	11
5	(Malawi) Chiukepo Msowoya	Nyasa Big Bullets	11
5	(Malawi) Vincent Nyangulu	Be Forward Wanderers	11
