= Mlatho Mponela FC =

- Full name: Mlatho Mponela Football Club
- Nickname: Kiliye Kiliye Boys
- Ground: Silver Stadium, Lilongwe
- Capacity: 20,000
- Chairman: (Malawi)
- Manager: (Malawi)
- League: TNM Super League
- 2019: TNM Super League, 15th of 16 (relegated)
Home colours

Mlatho Mponela Football Club are a Malawian football (soccer) club based in Mponela. The team plays in TNM Super League.

== Stadium ==
They play at the Silver Stadium which has a capacity of 20,000.

== Honours ==
Central Region Football League

- Winners (2): 2012–13. 2018
