= Envirom FC =

Envirom
- Full name: Envirom Football Club
- Ground: Kamuzu Stadium; Blantyre, Malawi
- Capacity: 50,000
- Chairman: (Malawi)
- Manager: (Malawi)
- League: TNM Super League

Envirom Football Club (Envirom) is a Malawian football (soccer) club that currently plays in the TNM Super League, the top division of Malawian football.

== Stadium ==
Currently the team plays at the 50000 capacity Kamuzu Stadium.

== Honours ==
Southern Region Football League

- Winners (1): 2012–13
