= Brighton Munthali =

Malawian footballer

Personal information
- Date of birth: 11 December 1997 (age 28)
- Place of birth: Mzuzu, Malawi
- Position: Goalkeeper

Team information
- Current team: Blue Eagles
- Number: 1

Senior career*
Years	Team	Apps	(Gls)
–2015	FISD Wizards		
2016–2023	Silver Strikers		
2023–	Blue Eagles		

International career
- Malawi U20
2015–	Malawi	32	(0)
- * Club domestic league appearances and goals

Brighton Munthali (born 11 December 1997) is a Malawian professional footballer who plays as a goalkeeper for Blue Eagles and the Malawi national team.

== Club career ==
Munthali signed with Silver Strikers ahead of the 2016 Super League of Malawi season after his team, FISD Wizards, were relegated.

== International career ==
Munthali represented the national under-20 team.

He made his senior international debut on 7 October 2015, at the 2018 World Cup qualifier, in a 2–0 defeat to Tanzania, resulting in an aggregate of 2–1 defeat.

He appeared at two 2022 World Cup qualifiers on 7 September and 10 September 2019, in a 1–0 aggregate victory against Botswana.
