= EPAC United FC =

Association football club in Malawi

EPAC United
- Full name: EPAC United Football Club
- Nickname: Njenjete zaku Lilongwe
- Founded: 1995; 31 years ago as Pakeeza FC
- Dissolved: 2017; 9 years ago
- Ground: Civo Stadium; Lilongwe
- Capacity: 25,000
- Final season; 2016: 11th in Super League of Malawi

EPAC United Football Club was a Malawian football (soccer) club based in Lilongwe and played its home matches at the 25,000 capacity Civo Stadium. The club played eight seasons in the Super League of Malawi, the top division of Malawian football.

== History ==
The club was founded in 1995 as Pakeeza FC and played in the Regional Football Leagues of Malawi.

In the 2007 season, Pakeeza won the Central Region Football League, the Second Division of Malawi and promoted for the first time to Super League of Malawi. Pakeeza finished thirteenth the first season in the Super League spared from relegation, after the Malawi Police Service decided to disbanded Eagle Beaks Lilongwe.

In July 2009, the club was renamed as EPAC United (Electrical Power and Accessories Contractors United) and finished on thirteen place at the end of the 2009–10 season relegated to Second Division.

EPAC United returned to the Malawi top flight league at the end of the 2010–11 Second Division season, winning the Central Region Football League.

Returned to the Super League, EPAC finished sixth in the 2011–12 season, but the follows seasons were disappointing for "Njenjete", occupying ninth position on the 2012–13 season and eleven in the next four seasons (2013, 2014, 2015 and 2016).

In 2017, EPAC United ceded the Super League of Malawi place to Civil Service United which relegated at the end of the 2016 season.

== Honours ==
Central Region Football League

- Winners (2): 2007, 2010–11
- Runners-up (1): 2006
