= Mzuzu United FC =

- Full name: Mzuzu United Football Club
- Nickname: Super Eagles
- Founded: 2004; 22 years ago
- Ground: Mzuzu Stadium; Mzuzu
- Capacity: 10,000
- Chairman: (Malawi)
- Manager: (Malawi)
- League: TNM Super League
Third colours

Mzuzu United Football Club is a Malawian football (soccer) club based in Mzuzu that currently plays in the Northern Region Football League, the second division of Malawian football.

== Stadium ==
Currently the team plays at the 10000 capacity Mzuzu Stadium.

== Honours ==
Northern Region Football League

- Winners (1): 2012–13
