= 2015 Super League of Malawi =

Football season in Malawi

Super League of Malawi
- Season: 2015
- Dates: 18 April – 24 December
- Champions: Nyasa Big Bullets
- Relegated: Dedza Young Soccer; Airborne Rangers; FISD Wizards
- Matches: 210
- Goals: 494 (2.35 per match)
- Top goalscorer: Innocent Bokosi; Chiukepo Msowoya (14 goals each)

The 2015 TNM Super League was the 30th season of the Super League of Malawi, the top professional league for association football clubs in Malawi since its establishment in 1986. It started on 18 April 2015 and ended on 24 December 2015. Nyasa Big Bullets successfully defended their title, winning the twelfth Super League title.

== Teams ==
Fifteen teams compete in this season: the top twelve teams from the previous season and three promoted teams from the regional leagues. Dedza Young Soccer (Central Region Football League), Surestream Academy (Southern Region Football League) and Mzuni FC (Northern Region Football League) entered as the three promoted teams, instead of the three relegated teams from previous season, Blantyre United, Chikwawa United and Karonga United.

Other changes

- Surestream Academy, was renamed during the season as FISD Wizards.

== League table ==
Pos	Team	Pld	W	D	L	GF	GA	GD	Pts	Qualification or relegation
1	Nyasa Big Bullets (C)	28	20	6	2	52	24	+28	66	Qualification to the CAF Champions League
2	MAFCO Salima	28	15	5	8	42	29	+13	50	
3	Blue Eagles	28	13	9	6	45	29	+16	48	
4	Be Forward Wanderers	28	12	9	7	36	29	+7	45	
5	Silver Strikers	28	12	8	8	37	26	+11	44	
6	Azam Tigers	28	11	9	8	33	28	+5	42	
7	Red Lions	28	11	8	9	42	39	+3	41	
8	Kamuzu Barracks	28	9	9	10	27	27	0	36	
9	Moyale Barracks	28	8	10	10	28	27	+1	34	
10	Civil Service United	28	9	7	12	25	29	−4	34	Qualification to the CAF Confederation Cup (Note: Civil Service United are the 2015 Standard Bank Knockout Cup winners.)
11	EPAC United	28	8	6	14	31	47	−16	30	
12	Mzuni	28	8	5	15	22	35	−13	29	
13	Dedza Young Soccer (R)	28	8	5	15	28	48	−20	29	Relegation to regional leagues
14	Airborne Rangers (R)	28	6	7	15	21	37	−16	25	Relegation to regional leagues
15	FISD Wizards (R)	28	4	9	15	25	40	−15	21	Relegation to regional leagues

Source: Soccerway
(C) Champions; (R) Relegated
