= Saidu Dansadau =

Nigerian politician (born 1953)

Senator for Zamfara Central
- In office 29 May 1999 – 29 May 2007
- Succeeded by: Hassan Nasiha

Personal details
- Born: 20 June 1953 (age 72) Zamfara State, Nigeria

Saidu Muhammed Dansadau (born 20 June 1953) is a Nigerian politician, he was elected Senator for the Zamfara Central constituency of Zamfara State, Nigeria at the start of the Nigerian Fourth Republic, running on the All People's Party (APP) platform. He took office on 29 May 1999. He was reelected in April 2003 on the All Nigeria People's Party platform for another four years.

== Birth and early career ==
Dansadau was born in June 1953. He obtained a BSc (education) and a PGD (public administration), and worked as an educationalist. He began medium, and later large-scale farming in 1977, and continued to stay involved in farming throughout his political career. He was the Sokoto State Secretary of the National Party of Nigeria (NPN) from 1981 to 1983 during the Second Nigerian Republic.

== Senate career ==
After taking his seat in the Senate in June 1999, Dansadau was appointed to committees on Public Accounts, Health, Labour, Commerce (chairman), National Planning and Internal Affairs. For several years he was secretary-general of the Northern Senators’ Forum. In March 2005 Dansadau called for the Senate President, Chief Adolphus Wabara, to resign since he had been implicated in the N55 million bribery scandal. In April 2005 Wabara did finally resign after allegations were made that he and others took a $400,000 bribe from the education minister, Fabian Osuji.

Dansadau was a strong opponent of allowing President Olusegun Obasanjo to run for a third term. As a member of the National Assembly Joint Committee of the Review of the Constitution, in February 2006 he said he would boycott a public hearing on the review of the 1999 Constitution, which would allow this change. In April 2006, as Chairman of the Publicity Committee of the 2007 Movement he said that Nigeria would break up if the move to allow a third term succeeded. He commended Vice-president Atiku Abubakar for speaking out against the proposal, and defended him from impeachment moves.

== Later career ==
Dansadau left the Senate in May 2007, and in October 2008 announced that he was resigning from the ANPP and from partisan politics in general. Dansadau, who had previously been a large-scale farmer, became the promoter of the Maslaha Seed Firm in Gusau, Zamfara State.

In 2010 Dansadau was appointed Chairman of a 12-person Committee on Repositioning Land Administration in the Federal Capital Territory (FCT). The committee was set up to verify all land allocations from 2007 and all mass housing allocations from 2004. The goal was to find and prevent multiple allocations, forgery and abuse of records at the Land Registry and the Abuja Geographic Information Systems. Dansadau said that three former FCT ministers, Nasir el-Rufai, Aliyu Modibbo Umar and Adamu Aliero had allocated 18,445 plots of land between 1 January 2007 and April, 2010. Over 70% had been carried out in the last five months of el-Rufai's administration. Of these only 2.5% had actually been developed. He said multiple allocations, forgery and falsification of records were huge problems, as was illegal revocation of plots, blaming corrupt officials and chaotic procedures. He said the Land Use Allocation Committee was ineffective during the period under review.
