= 2016 Super League of Malawi =

Football season in Malawi

Super League of Malawi
- Season: 2016
- Dates: 16 April – 31 December
- Champions: Kamuzu Barracks
- Relegated: Karonga United; CIVO United; Max Bullets
- Matches: 240
- Goals: 560 (2.33 per match)
- Top goalscorer: Richard Mbulu (19 goals)
- Biggest home win: EPAC United 4-1 Kamuzu Barracks (2 May 2016)
- Biggest away win: Max Bullets 3-5 Blue Eagles (1 May 2016)
- Highest scoring: Max Bullets 3-5 Blue Eagles (1 May 2016)
- Longest winning run: Blue Eagles (4)
- Longest unbeaten run: Blue Eagles (4)
- Longest winless run: Dwangwa United; Kamuzu Barracks (4)
- Longest losing run: Kamuzu Barracks (3)
- All statistics correct as of 2 May 2016.

The 2016 TNM Super League was the 31st season of the Super League of Malawi, the top professional league for association football clubs in Malawi since its establishment in 1986. The season played between 16 April and 31 December 2016. Nyasa Big Bullets were the defending champions for the second consecutive year. Kamuzu Barracks won their first league title.

== Teams ==
A total of sixteen teams will contest the league including thirteen teams from the previous season and three teams promoted from regional leagues: Dwangwa United (Central Region Football League), Max Bullets (Southern Region Football league) and Karonga United (Northern Region Football league).

Super League of Malawi (SULOM) decided to extend the top level to 16 clubs; the additional place is contested by the three relegated teams in a play-off.

The relegation play-off was played on 11–13 March between Airborne Rangers and FISD Wizards at Civo Stadium in Lilongwe and ended with the victory of the FISD Wizard, who remained in the TNM Super League.

Dedza Young Soccer, withdrew from play-off after obtained a court injunction against this play-off after the first match was played, arguing they should have been elected to remain at the top level without any play-off, later, Dedza Young Soccer, decided to withdraw the injunction but maintaining decision to not participate in play-off.

Locations of the 2016 Super League of Malawi teams

== League table ==
Pos	Team	Pld	W	D	L	GF	GA	GD	Pts	Qualification or relegation
1	Kamuzu Barracks (C)	30	19	4	7	55	29	+26	61	Qualification to the CAF Champions League
2	Big Bullets	30	16	12	2	43	17	+26	60	
3	Silver Strikers	30	16	8	6	45	23	+22	56	
4	Blue Eagles	30	16	6	8	41	26	+15	54	
5	MAFCO Salima	30	14	8	8	45	33	+12	50	
6	Be Forward Wanderers	30	13	10	7	51	33	+18	49	
7	Moyale Barracks	30	13	8	9	41	26	+15	47	
8	Azam Tigers	30	10	13	7	35	21	+14	43	
9	Mzuni	30	10	11	9	31	29	+2	41	
10	Red Lions	30	11	7	12	33	36	−3	40	
11	EPAC United	30	9	7	14	30	39	−9	34	
12	Dwangwa United	30	7	9	14	30	41	−11	30	
13	FISD Wizards	30	8	6	16	17	43	−26	30	
14	Karonga United (R)	30	7	6	17	28	64	−36	27	Relegation to regional leagues
15	CIVO United (R)	30	5	10	15	20	35	−15	25	Relegation to regional leagues
16	Max Bullets (R)	30	1	5	24	15	65	−50	8	Relegation to regional leagues

Source: Soccerway
Rules for classification: 1) points; 2) goal difference; 3) number of goals scored.
(C) Champions; (R) Relegated

== Results ==
Home \ Away	AZT	BFW	BIG	BLU	CVU	DWA	EPA	KAM	KAR	MAF	MAX	MOY	MZU	RED	SIL	WIZ
Azam Tigers		0–2	0–0	0–1	0–0	1–2	1–1	1–0	7–1	1–1	2–2	1–0	2–0	0–1	1–1	0–0
Be Forward Wanderers	2–1		0–1	1–2	0–0	1–1	4–1	2–1	4–0	2–3	2–0	1–1	2–4	3–1	3–2	2–0
Big Bullets	1–1	1–1		1–0	1–0	1–0	2–0	4–1	4–3	2–0	5–1	0–0	2–0	3–3	2–1	1–1
Blue Eagles	0–1	2–1	0–0		2–0	2–1	2–1	0–2	3–1	1–0	1–1	1–0	1–1	3–0	0–0	6–0
CIVO United	1–1	1–2	0–2	0–1		1–2	0–0	0–1	2–2	3–2	1–0	1–2	1–1	1–1	1–2	1–0
Dwangwa United	0–0	0–0	0–0	0–1	3–1		3–1	1–4	1–1	2–2	2–0	1–2	1–2	0–1	0–1	2–0
EPAC United	0–0	2–2	0–1	0–0	0–1	3–0		4–1	2–4	1–0	3–0	3–5	3–2	0–1	0–0	2–1
Kamuzu Barracks	3–1	2–1	1–0	4–0	2–2	5–1	1–0		4–1	1–0	2–0	2–0	1–0	2–0	4–2	2–0
Karonga United	0–1	0–0	1–0	2–1	1–0	3–2	0–1	0–3		0–5	2–0	0–2	0–1	2–1	0–3	1–1
MAFCO Salima	2–1	2–1	2–2	2–1	1–0	2–2	1–0	1–1	3–1		2–0	1–0	1–0	1–0	3–0	0–0
Max Bullets	0–2	0–2	0–3	3–5	0–2	0–0	0–0	0–2	1–1	3–2		0–2	0–2	0–2	0–3	1–2
Moyale Barracks	0–0	2–2	0–0	0–1	0–0	0–0	4–0	3–1	4–0	3–0	3–2		1–1	1–0	0–1	2–0
Mzuni	0–0	1–1	0–0	0–0	1–0	1–3	0–1	3–1	1–0	2–2	2–0	1–0		0–0	0–0	1–0
Red Lions	0–3	1–1	1–2	2–1	4–0	1–0	1–0	1–1	2–1	1–1	2–1	2–1	2–2		1–2	0–1
Silver Strikers	0–1	1–2	0–0	2–1	0–0	3–0	2–0	0–0	5–0	1–0	4–0	3–1	2–1	2–1		2–1
FISD Wizards	0–5	0–4	0–2	0–2	1–0	1–0	0–1	1–0	0–0	1–3	2–0	1–2	2–1	1–0	0–0	

Source: rsssf.com
Legend: Blue = home team win; Yellow = draw; Red = away team win.

== Top scorers ==
Rank	Player	Club	Goals
1	(Malawi) Richard Mbulu	MAFCO Salima	19
2	(Malawi) Chiukepo Msowoya	Nyasa Big Bullets	17
3	(Malawi) Peter Wadabwa	Be Forward Wanderers	16
4	(Malawi) Manasseh Chiyesa	Kamuzu Barracks	15
5	(Malawi) Bright Munthali	Azam Tigers	13
6	(Malawi) Binwell Katinji	Silver Strikers	12
