= Firew Getahun =

Ethiopian footballer

Personal information
- Full name: Firew Getahun Alemayehu
- Date of birth: 12 June 1992 (age 34)
- Place of birth: Shashamane, Ethiopia
- Position: Goalkeeper

Team information
- Current team: CBE
- Number: 30

Senior career*
Years	Team	Apps	(Gls)
2018–2023	Dire Dawa City	74	(0)
2023–	CBE	14	(0)

International career^{‡}
2018-	Ethiopia	1	(0)
- * Club domestic league appearances and goals as of 18 February 2024 ‡ National team caps and goals as of 25 March 2024

Firew Getahun Alemayehu (born 12 June 1992) is an Ethiopian professional footballer who plays as goalkeeper for Ethiopian Premier League club CBE and the Ethiopia national team.
