= Isaac Caulker =

Sierra Leonean Football Player

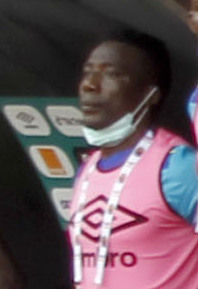
- Caulker in 2022

Personal information
- Date of birth: 25 January 1994 (age 32)
- Place of birth: Freetown, Sierra Leone
- Position: Goalkeeper

Senior career*
Years	Team	Apps	(Gls)
2016–	Kallon FC		
- * Club domestic league appearances and goals

Isaac Caulker (born 25 Jan 1994) is a Sierra Leonean professional footballer who plays as a goalkeeper for Sierra Leone National Premier League's side Kallon FC, and Sierra Leone national team.
