= Temptation Chiwunga =

Zimbabwean Footballer (born 1992)

Personal information
- Date of birth: 10 March 1992 (age 34)
- Position: Forward

Team information
- Current team: JDR Stars FC
- Number: 8

Senior career*
Years	Team	Apps	(Gls)
2016–2017	Magesi		
2017–2019	Ubuntu Cape Town		
2019–2020	Cape United		
2020–	JDR Stars		

International career
- Zimbabwe
- * Club domestic league appearances and goals

Temptation Chiwunga (born 10 March 1992) is a Zimbabwean professional footballer who plays as a forward for South Africa's National First Division club, JDR Stars FC, and the Zimbabwe national team.

Born in Zimbabwe, Chiwunga's family moved to South Africa in 2010, and he begain playing club football with JDR Stars. He captained Ubuntu Cape Town before returning to captain JDR Stars in 2020.
