= Kassim Ahamada =

Footballer (born 1992)

Personal information
- Date of birth: 18 April 1992 (age 34)
- Place of birth: Dzaoudzi, Mayotte, France
- Position: Right-back

Team information
- Current team: AS Chatou

Senior career*
Years	Team	Apps	(Gls)
2009–2013	Troyes B	45	(0)
2013–2015	Évry	45	(1)
2015–2017	Beauvais	29	(0)
2017–2018	Bourges Foot	21	(0)
2019–2020	Vierzon	14	(1)
2020–2022	Créteil	12	(0)
2020–2022	Créteil II	20	(0)
2022–	AS Chatou		

International career
2011–2023	Comoros	11	(0)
- * Club domestic league appearances and goals

Kassim Ahamada (born 18 April 1992) is a professional footballer who plays as a right-back for Régional 1 club AS Chatou. Born in Mayotte, France, he played for the Comoros national team.

== Club career ==
Born in Dzaoudzi, Mayotte, France, Ahamada has played for Troyes B, Évry, Beauvais, Bourges Foot and Vierzon at the fifth level of French football. In the summer of 2020 he was signed by Créteil to play with their B team at the same level, but during the season was drafted into the first team and played a number of games in Championnat National.

== International career ==
Ahamada made his international debut for Comoros in 2011.
