= Moyadh Ousseni =

Comorian footballer (born 1993)

Personal information
- Date of birth: 2 April 1993 (age 33)
- Place of birth: Fréjus, France
- Height: 1.82 m (6 ft 0 in)
- Position: Goalkeeper

Team information
- Current team: Fréjus Saint-Raphaël
- Number: 30

Senior career*
Years	Team	Apps	(Gls)
2013–	Fréjus Saint-Raphaël	19	(0)

International career^{‡}
2021–	Comoros	1	(0)
- * Club domestic league appearances and goals as of 00:59, 21 April 2022 (UTC) ‡ National team caps and goals as of 22:39, 25 June 2021 (UTC)

Moyadh Ousseni (born 2 April 1993) is a professional footballer who plays as a goalkeeper for Championnat National 1 club Fréjus Saint-Raphaël. Born in France, he plays for the Comoros national team.

== International career ==
Ousseni made his senior international debut for Comoros in a 2021 FIFA Arab Cup qualification match against Palestine, a 5–1 defeat.
