= Desta Yohannes =

Ethiopian footballer

Personal information
- Full name: Desta Yohannes Egeta
- Date of birth: 17 April 1998 (age 28)
- Place of birth: Hawassa, Ethiopia
- Height: 1.79 m (5 ft 10 in)
- Position: Left-back

Team information
- Current team: Adama City
- Number: 7

Senior career*
Years	Team	Apps	(Gls)
2015–2018	Hawassa City		
2018–2021	Defence Force		
2021–	Adama City	53	(4)

International career^{‡}
2019–	Ethiopia	8	(0)
- * Club domestic league appearances and goals as of 21:47, 6 July 2023 (UTC) ‡ National team caps and goals as of 21:47, 23 December 2021 (UTC)

Desta Yohannes Egeta (Amharic: ደስታ ዮሃንስ; born 17 April 1998) is an Ethiopian professional footballer who plays as a left-back for Ethiopian Premier League club Adama City and the Ethiopia national team.

== International career ==
Yohannes made his international debut with the Ethiopia national team in a 0–0 friendly tie with Zambia on 5 August 2017.
