= Yeami Dunia =

Sierra Leonean footballer

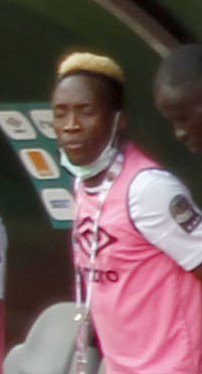
- Dunia in 2022

Personal information
- Date of birth: 16 December 1996 (age 29)
- Place of birth: Freetown, Sierra Leone
- Height: 1.73 m (5 ft 8 in)
- Position: Full-back

Team information
- Current team: Old Edwardians
- Number: 15

Senior career*
| Years | Team | Apps | (Gls) |
| 2011–2018 | Johansen | | |
| 2019–2022 | East End Lions | | |
| 2022 | Bo Rangers | | |
| 2022–2023 | Bokelj | 1 | (0) |
| 2023– | Old Edwardians | | |

International career^{‡}
| 2012– | Sierra Leone | 34 | (0) |
- * Club domestic league appearances and goals as of 20:26, 27 February 2021 (UTC) ‡ National team caps and goals as of 19 November 2024

Yeami Dunia (born 16 December 1996) is a Sierra Leonean footballer who plays as a full-back for Old Edwardians.
