= Abdoul Karim Cissé =

Ivorian footballer

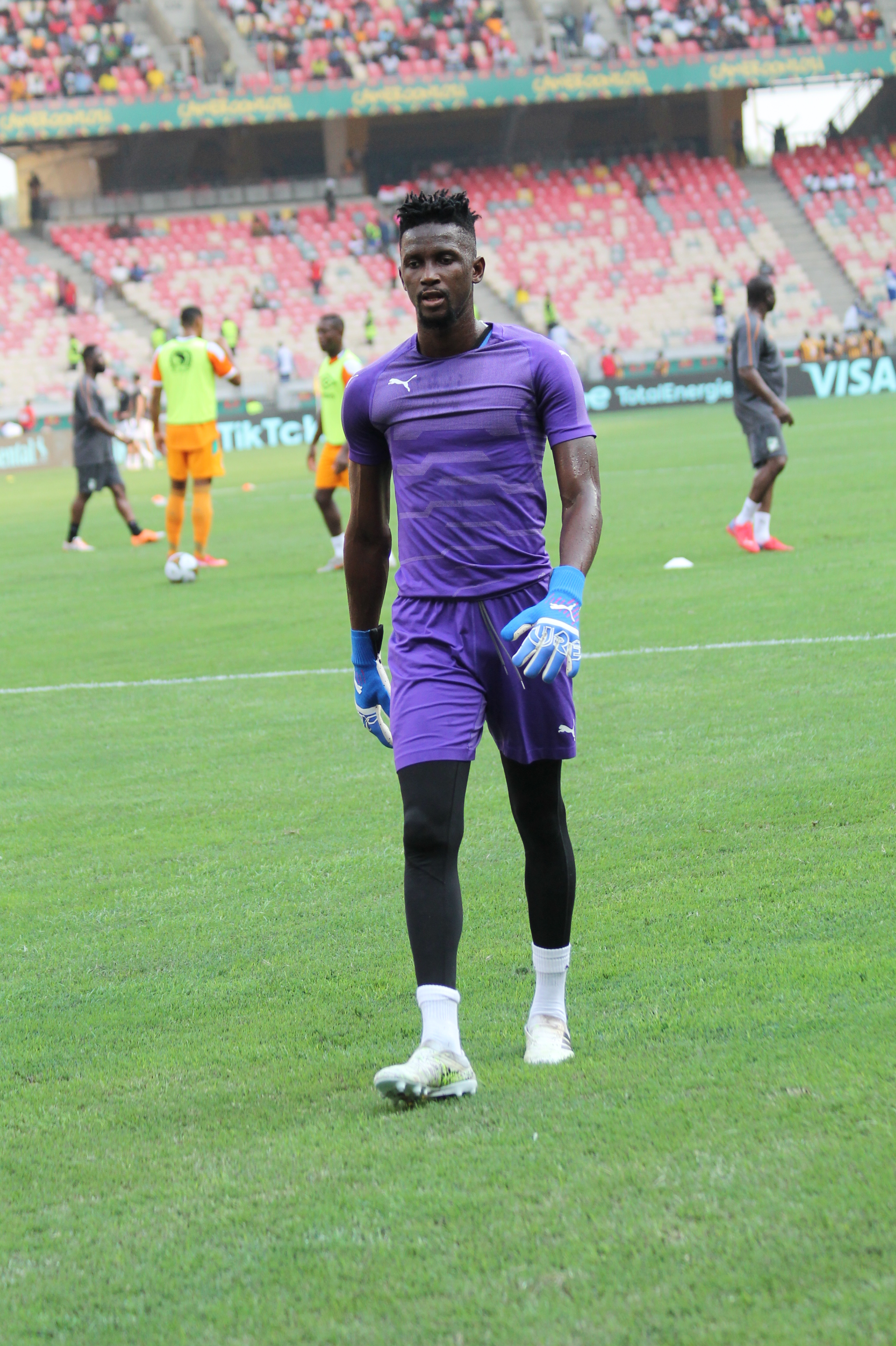
- Abdoul Karim Cissé warming up ahead of the Ivory Coast match.

Personal information
- Full name: Abdoul Karim Cissé
- Date of birth: 20 October 1985 (age 41)
- Place of birth: Abidjan, Ivory Coast
- Height: 1.87 m (6 ft 2 in)
- Position: Goalkeeper

Team information
- Current team: LYS Sassandra
- Number: 1

Senior career*
Years	Team	Apps	(Gls)
2006–2011	Issia Wazy		
2011–2015	Africa Sports		
2015–2017	SC Gagnoa		
2017–2022	ASEC Mimosas		
2022–2023	Venda		
2023–	LYS Sassandra		

International career
2014–	Ivory Coast	6	(0)
- * Club domestic league appearances and goals

Abdoul Karim Cissé (born 20 October 1985) is an Ivorian professional footballer who plays as a goalkeeper for LYS Sassandra and formerly played for the Ivory Coast national football team.

== Career ==
In order to finish third in 2016 African Nations Championship, Cissé made two penalty saves to deny Guinea a chance at victory.

=== Club career ===
Cissé made 27 international appearances for ASEC Mimosas between the 2017/18 season and the 2021/22 season; 14 in the CAF Confederation Cup and 13 in the CAF Champions League, respectively. During a CAF Confederation Cup group stage match against Raja Casablanca in 2018, he picked up a red card after fouling an opposing player. ASEC Mimosas would go on to lose that match 1–0. Cissé won the Ivorian Ligue 1 three times with ASEC Mimosas; in 2017/18, 2020/21 and 2021/22.

== Honours ==
- 1x Association des Footballeurs Ivoiriens Player of the Month
