= John Noble Barinyima =

Nigerian footballer

Personal information
- Date of birth: 6 June 1993 (age 33)
- Place of birth: Bori City, Nigeria
- Height: 1.83 m (6 ft 0 in)
- Position: Goalkeeper

Team information
- Current team: Tabora United

Senior career*
Years	Team	Apps	(Gls)
2012–2020	ASC Kara		
2020–2023	Enyimba		
2023–	Tabora United		

International career^{‡}
2017–	Nigeria		
- * Club domestic league appearances and goals as of 10:50, 31 July 2023 (UTC) ‡ National team caps and goals as of 10:50, 31 December 2021 (UTC)

John Noble Barinyima (born 6 June 1993) is a Nigerian professional footballer who plays as a goalkeeper for Tabora United and the Nigeria national team.

== International career ==
On 25 December 2021, He was shortlisted in 2021 AFCON Nations Cup by Caretaker Coach Eguavoen as part of the 28-Man Nigeria Squad
