= Youssouf Siby =

Guinean footballer (born 2000)

Personal information
- Full name: Gaoussou Youssouf Siby
- Date of birth: 15 April 2000 (age 26)
- Height: 1.77 m (5 ft 10 in)
- Position: Midfielder

Team information
- Current team: Hafia FC
- Number: 10

Youth career
- ?–2021: Wakriya AC

Senior career*
Years	Team	Apps	(Gls)
2021–2022	Wakriya AC	8	(6)
2022–	Hafia FC		

International career
2021–	Guinea	2	(1)
- * Club domestic league appearances and goals

Gaoussou Youssouf Siby (born 15 April 2000) is a Guinean professional footballer who plays as a midfielder for Guinée Championnat National club Hafia FC and the Guinea national team.
