= Elber Evora =

Cape Verdean footballer (born 1999)

Personal information
- Date of birth: 2 December 1999 (age 26)
- Place of birth: Rotterdam, Netherlands
- Height: 1.92 m (6 ft 4 in)
- Position: Goalkeeper

Youth career
- –2010: SC Feyenoord
- 2010–2020: Feyenoord
- 2020–2021: AZ

Senior career*
Years	Team	Apps	(Gls)
2020–2021	Jong AZ	4	(0)
2021–2022	AEL Limassol	0	(0)
2024–2026	GVVV	41	(0)
- * Club domestic league appearances and goals as of 14:21, 20 September 2024 (UTC)

Elber Evora (born 2 December 1999) is a footballer who most recently played as a goalkeeper for Tweede Divisie club GVVV. Born in the Netherlands, Evora has represented the Cape Verde national team.

Evora announced his departure from GVVV in January 2026, leaving them in the summer for a club closer to Rotterdam.

== Career statistics ==
=== Club ===
As of 18 February 2024.

Season	Club	League			Cup		Other		Total	
Season	Club	Division	Apps	Goals	Apps	Goals	Apps	Goals	Apps	Goals
2018–19	Feyenoord	Eredivisie	0	0	0	0	0	0	0	0
2019–20	Feyenoord	Eredivisie	0	0	0	0	0	0	0	0
2020–21	Jong AZ	Eerste Divisie	4	0	–		–		4	0
2020–21	AZ	Eredivisie	0	0	0	0	0	0	0	0
2021–22	AEL Limassol	Cypriot First Division	0	0	0	0	0	0	0	0
Career total			4	0	0	0	0	0	4	0
