= Stain Davie =

Malawian footballer

Personal information
- Date of birth: 23 September 1997 (age 29)
- Place of birth: Malawi
- Position: Striker

Team information
- Current team: Silver Strikers

Senior career*
Years	Team	Apps	(Gls)
2018–2019	TN Stars FC		
2019	Vilankulo		
2019–2020	TN Stars FC		
2020–	Silver Strikers		

International career^{‡}
2022–	Malawi	1	(0)
- * Club domestic league appearances and goals as of 04:38, 19 January 2022 (UTC) ‡ National team caps and goals as of 04:38, 19 January 2022 (UTC)

Stain Davie (born 23 September 1997) is a Malawian professional footballer who plays as a striker for the Malawian club Silver Strikers, and the Malawi national team.

== Career ==
Davie began his career with TN Stars FC, before moving to Mozambique with Vilankulo in April 2019. He moved to TN Stars, before again transferring out to Silver Strikers on 23 February 2020.

== International career ==
Davie was part of the Malawi squad the 2021 Africa Cup of Nations. He debuted with Malawi in the tournament in a 2–1 quarterfinal loss to Morocco on 25 January 2022.
