= Martin Mapisa =

Zimbabwean football player (born 1998)

Personal information
- Date of birth: 25 May 1998 (age 28)
- Place of birth: Harare, Zimbabwe
- Height: 1.95 m (6 ft 5 in)
- Position: Goalkeeper

Team information
- Current team: Málaga City
- Number: 13

Senior career*
Years	Team	Apps	(Gls)
2018–2019	Almuñécar City	6	(0)
2019	Vélez	1	(0)
2019	Barrio NS Remedios	6	(0)
2019–2020	Vélez	11	(0)
2020–2023	Zamora	11	(0)
2022	→ Llanera (loan)	10	(0)
2023–	Málaga City	1	(0)

International career^{‡}
2021–	Zimbabwe	1	(0)
- * Club domestic league appearances and goals as of 29 October 2023 ‡ National team caps and goals as of 29 March 2021

Martin Mapisa (born 25 May 1998) is a Zimbabwean football player wo plays as a goalkeeper. He plays for Spanish club Málaga City.

== International career ==
Mapisa made his debut for Zimbabwe national football team on 29 March 2021 in a 2021 Africa Cup of Nations qualifier against Zambia.

On 11 December 2025, Mapisa was called up to the Zimbabwe squad for the 2025 Africa Cup of Nations.
