= Saidu Fofanah =

Sierra Leonean footballer

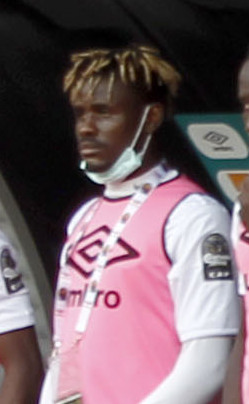
- Fofanah in 2022

Personal information
- Full name: Saidu Sahid Fofanah
- Date of birth: 14 September 1997 (age 29)
- Place of birth: Freetown, Sierra Leone
- Height: 1.80 m (5 ft 11 in)
- Position: Midfielder

Team information
- Current team: Hapoel Ra'anana
- Number: 45

Senior career*
Years	Team	Apps	(Gls)
2016–2017	Åmål	20	(5)
2017–2024	Kallon		
2024–2025	AS Pikine		
2025	Zhetysu	22	(0)
2026–	Hapoel Ra'anana	5	(0)

International career^{‡}
2021–	Sierra Leone	17	(1)
- * Club domestic league appearances and goals as of 24 June 2026 ‡ National team caps and goals as of 13 October 2025

Saidu Sahid Fofanah (born 14 September 1997) is a Sierra Leonean professional footballer who plays as a midfielder for the Liga Leumit club Hapoel Ra'anana and the Sierra Leone national team.

== International career ==
Sesay made his international debut with the Sierra Leone national team in a 1–0 2021 Africa Cup of Nations qualification win over Benin on 15 June 2021. He was part of the Sierra Leone squad the 2021 Africa Cup of Nations.
