= Saidu Mansaray =

Sierra Leonean footballer

Personal information
- Date of birth: 21 February 2001 (age 25)
- Position: Defender

Team information
- Current team: [Bo Rangers]
- Number: 9

Senior career*
Years	Team	Apps	(Gls)
2020-2022	Wusum Stars		(01)

International career^{‡}
2021–	Sierra Leone	4	(0)
- * Club domestic league appearances and goals as of 23:56, 3 January 2022 (UTC) ‡ National team caps and goals as of 23:56, 3 January 2022 (UTC)

Saidu Mansaray (born 21 February 2001) is a Sierra Leonean footballer who plays as a defender for Bo Rangers and the Sierra Leone national team. He was named in Sierra Leone's squad for the 2021 Africa Cup of Nations, which will be held in January and February 2022.
