= Saidu Bah Kamara =

Sierra Leonean Football Player

Personal information
- Date of birth: 3 March 2002 (age 24)
- Place of birth: Freetown, Sierra Leone
- Height: 1.86 m (6 ft 1 in)
- Position: Defensive midfielder

Senior career*
Years	Team	Apps	(Gls)
- Bo Rangers FC

International career
- Sierra Leone
- * Club domestic league appearances and goals

Saidu Bah Kamara (born 3 March 2002) is a Sierra Leonean professional footballer who plays as a defensive midfielder for the Sierra Leone National Premier League side Bo Rangers FC, and Sierra Leone national team.
