= 2009 African U-17 Championship squads =

== Guinea ==
Coach: Sékou Somparé

No.	Pos.	Player	Date of birth (age)	Caps	Club
1		Aboubacar Camara	1 June 1993 (aged 15)		(Guinea) Hafia FC
2		Alhassane Keita	16 April 1992 (aged 16)		(Guinea) CI Kamsar
3		Ousmane Soumah	3 June 1993 (aged 15)		(Guinea) Etoile de Guinee
4		Aboubacar Camara	1 January 1993 (aged 16)		(Guinea) ASFAG
5		Kevin Lamah	2 February 1992 (aged 17)		(Guinea) CI Kamsar
6		Mohamed Salifou Camara	18 October 1993 (aged 15)		(Guinea) Etoile de Guinee
7		Alhassane Bangoura	30 April 1992 (aged 16)		(Guinea) Etoile de Guinee
8		Djibril Diakite	1 August 1993 (aged 15)		(Guinea) Athlético de Coléah
9		Ansoumane Bangoura	4 May 1993 (aged 15)		(Guinea) ASFAG
10		Keita Karamokoba	15 April 1994 (aged 14)		(Guinea) Fello Star
11		Ibrahima Sory Camara	5 May 1993 (aged 15)		(Guinea) Satellite FC
12		Moustapha Fella Mara	1 January 1992 (aged 17)		(Guinea) CI Kamsar
13		Tamba Kamano	13 September 1993 (aged 15)		(Guinea) Etoile de Guinee
14		Abdoul Karim Voula	5 December 1993 (aged 15)		(Guinea) Athlético de Coléah
15		Conte Vamadouba	19 August 1993 (aged 15)		(Guinea)
16		Fode Camara	7 June 1992 (aged 16)		(Guinea) Etoile de Guinee
17		Almamy Sylla	26 February 1994 (aged 15)		(Guinea) Soumba FC
18		Alpha Bappa Diallo	22 December 1992 (aged 16)		(Guinea) CI Kamsar

== Burkina Faso ==
Coach: (Brazil) Roberto Danton

No.	Pos.	Player	Date of birth (age)	Caps	Club
1		Germain Sanou	26 May 1992 (aged 16)		(Burkina Faso) Centre st etienne de Bobo
2		Adama Haiki	2 October 1992 (aged 16)		(Burkina Faso) Centre St. Etienne de Bobo
3		Allassane Sango	7 January 1993 (aged 16)		(Burkina Faso) ASFA Yennenga
4		Rachid Coulibaly	28 February 1993 (aged 16)		(Burkina Faso) Centre Naba Kango
5		Ziem Somda	30 November 1993 (aged 15)		(Burkina Faso) Étoile Filante
6		Adama Yabao	31 December 1992 (aged 16)		(Burkina Faso) AS SONABEL
7		Fadil Sido	13 April 1993 (aged 15)		(Burkina Faso) Centre Naba Kango
8		Ibrahim Barry	31 January 1993 (aged 16)		(Burkina Faso) Étoile Filante
9		Saidou Boundane	26 December 1993 (aged 15)		(Burkina Faso) AS SONABEL
10		Pascal Karama	11 May 1993 (aged 15)		(Burkina Faso) RC Bobo Dioulasso
11		Victor Nikiema	23 September 1993 (aged 15)		(Burkina Faso) Centre Naba Kango
12		Lassane Nikiema	16 December 1993 (aged 15)		(Burkina Faso) FAC
13		Wendkouni Sylvain Kabre	7 December 1992 (aged 16)		(Burkina Faso) Rail Club du Kadiogo
14		Dalhata Soro	18 November 1992 (aged 16)		(Burkina Faso) ASFA Yennenga
15		Ali Bagayan	20 June 1993 (aged 15)		(Burkina Faso) Étoile Filante
16		Abdoul aziz raoul Konseiga	10 January 1993 (aged 16)		(Burkina Faso) AS SONABEL
17		Zidane Zoungrana	14 January 1993 (aged 16)		(Burkina Faso) Centre Naba Kango
18		Jerome Ouiya	7 October 1992 (aged 16)		(Burkina Faso) Centre Naba Kango

== The Gambia ==
Coach: (Egypt) Tarik Siagy

No.	Pos.	Player	Date of birth (age)	Caps	Club
1		Musa Camara	2 November 1992 (aged 16)		(The Gambia) Gamtel FC
2		Jammeh Buba Findi	14 March 1992 (aged 16)		(The Gambia) Interior FC
3		Dawda Ceesay	25 January 1993 (aged 16)		(The Gambia) Hawks FC
4		Lamin Samateh	26 June 1992 (aged 16)		(The Gambia) Steve Biko Football Club
5		Nyang Pateh	14 March 1992 (aged 16)		(The Gambia) Seaview FC
6		Baboucarr Savage	7 June 1992 (aged 16)		(The Gambia) Armed Forces FC
7		Saihou Gassama	11 December 1993 (aged 15)		(The Gambia) Gambia Ports Authority FC
8		Sainey Sambou	2 February 1992 (aged 17)		(The Gambia) Africell/St.Matty FC
9		Seedy Bah	6 July 1992 (aged 16)		(The Gambia) Bakau United
10		Alasana Camara	12 December 1993 (aged 15)		(The Gambia) Steve Biko Football Club
11		Baldeh Jatta	4 April 1992 (aged 16)		(The Gambia) Water Man FC
12		Kemo Fatty	14 June 1992 (aged 16)		(The Gambia) Seaview FC
13		Jobe Matarr	22 March 1992 (aged 16)		(The Gambia) Real de Banjul
14		Jatta Abdoulie	2 January 1993 (aged 16)		(The Gambia) Steve Biko FC
15		Omar Colley	24 October 1992 (aged 16)		(The Gambia) Wallidan FC
16		Ebrima Bojang	2 March 1992 (aged 16)		(The Gambia) Real de Banjul
17		Abdou Njie	26 September 1992 (aged 16)		(The Gambia) Gambia Ports Authority FC
18		Famara Bojang	6 June 1992 (aged 16)		(The Gambia) Steve Biko Football Club

== Malawi ==
Coach: John Kaputa

No.	Pos.	Player	Date of birth (age)	Caps	Club
1		Cuthbert Seengwa	19 April 1992 (aged 16)		(Malawi) Kawale Sec. Sch.
2		Lawrence Milanzi	6 February 1992 (aged 17)		(Malawi) Eagle Strikers
3		Kondwani Lufeyo	12 November 1992 (aged 16)		(Malawi) Tigers FC
4		Patience Kalumo	15 October 1994 (aged 14)		(Malawi) Dedza sec. Sch.
5		Vilipo Mhango	11 November 1993 (aged 15)		(Malawi) Zomba Medicals FC
6		Peter Mselema	20 November 1993 (aged 15)		(Malawi) Ngowe Sec. Sch.
7		Tonny Chitsulo	13 August 1993 (aged 15)		(Malawi) Silver Strikers
8		Timothy Nyirenda	10 September 1993 (aged 15)		(Malawi) Eagle Strikers
9		Andy Simukonda	18 June 1992 (aged 16)		(Malawi) Moyale Barracks
10		Luke Milanzi	4 December 1994 (aged 14)		(Malawi) Eagle Strikers
11		Kelvin Malikebu	14 October 1993 (aged 15)		(Malawi) Pakeeza FC
12		Robin Ngalande	2 November 1992 (aged 16)		(Malawi) Civo United
13		Innocent Jere	6 June 1992 (aged 16)		(Malawi) MTL Wanderers
14		Limbikani Mzava	12 November 1993 (aged 15)		(Malawi) Tigers FC
15		Takondwa Issa	7 July 1993 (aged 15)		(Malawi) Kamuzu Barracks
16		Victor Nangwale	12 October 1993 (aged 15)		(Malawi) Thyolo Medicals FC
17		Mike Kaziputa	9 October 1993 (aged 15)		(Malawi) Blackpool FC
18		Akimu Phiri	13 June 1992 (aged 16)		(Malawi) Blackpool FC

== Algeria ==
Coach: Otmane Ibrir

No.	Pos.	Player	Date of birth (age)	Caps	Club
1		Abdennour Merzouki	15 February 1992 (aged 17)		(Algeria) AC FAF 1
2		Ahmed Cheheima	8 April 1992 (aged 16)		(Algeria) AC FAF 1
3		Mustapha Anis Bouteldja	10 February 1992 (aged 17)		(Algeria) AC FAF 1
4		Mohammed Ilyas Cherchar	18 January 1992 (aged 17)		(Algeria) AC FAF 1
5		Ibrahim Bekakchi	10 January 1992 (aged 17)		(Algeria) AC FAF 1
6		Houssem Eddine Ferkous	31 January 1992 (aged 17)		(Algeria) AC FAF 1
7		Abdelghani Boughoula	27 September 1992 (aged 16)		(Algeria) AC FAF 1
8		Djelloul Djouba	2 April 1992 (aged 16)		(Algeria) AC FAF 1
9		Walid Athmani	18 April 1992 (aged 16)		(Algeria) AC FAF 1
10		Abdelhakim Bezzaz	20 October 1992 (aged 16)		(Algeria) AC FAF 1
11		Nadir Bendahmane	9 June 1992 (aged 16)		(France) AS Cannes
12		Mohamed Benyahia	30 June 1992 (aged 16)		(France) Nîmes Olympique
13		Aghiles Toulait	7 April 1992 (aged 16)		(Algeria) AC FAF 1
14		Abderrahmane Belkadi	6 June 1992 (aged 16)		(Algeria) AC FAF 1
15		Nabil Aït Fergane	9 April 1992 (aged 16)		(Algeria) AC FAF 1
16		Nacer Eddine Zaabat	19 January 1992 (aged 17)		(Algeria) AC FAF 1
17		Mohamed Nadir Ziane	27 March 1992 (aged 16)		(Algeria) AC FAF 1
18		Youcef Khelifi	4 March 1992 (aged 16)		(Algeria) AC FAF 1

== Cameroon ==
Coach: Christian Anatole Abée

No.	Pos.	Player	Date of birth (age)	Caps	Club
1		Thierry Tangouatio	4 May 1992 (aged 16)		(Cameroon) Cercle Yaoundé
2		Rodrigue Wamou Tchoutho	16 April 1992 (aged 16)		(Cameroon) Estuaire Douala
3		Thierry Onana	26 June 1992 (aged 16)		(Cameroon) AS Fortuna Yaoundé
4		Calvin Mangan	23 September 1992 (aged 16)		(Cameroon) Authentic FC Douala
5		Charlie Took	25 May 1993 (aged 15)		(Cameroon) Bandja FC
6		Jushua Mbuluba Ndoh	15 January 1992 (aged 17)		(Cameroon) Best Stars Limbe
7		Marc Cresus Ngaleba Ndongo	19 December 1992 (aged 16)		(Cameroon) FC Inter Lion
8		Armand Ken Ella	23 February 1993 (aged 16)		(Spain) FC Barcelona
9		Vincent Aboubakar	22 January 1992 (aged 17)		(Cameroon) Coton Sport FC
10		Fabrice Kerdy	11 February 1992 (aged 17)		(Cameroon) Tonnerre Yaoundé
11		Lionel Otto Essono	2 August 1992 (aged 16)		(Cameroon) FC Inter Lion
12		Kombi Mandjang	1 June 1992 (aged 16)		(Cameroon) Astres FC
13		Thierry Tchuente	27 March 1992 (aged 16)		(Cameroon) Astres FC
14		Clyde Armel Roger Essomba	8 February 1993 (aged 16)		(Cameroon) Fundesports Douala
15		Gabriel Junior Etémé	21 November 1992 (aged 16)		(Cameroon) Union Sportive Douala
16		Jean Efala	11 August 1992 (aged 16)		(Cameroon) Pelican Yaoundé
17		Gaël Etock	5 July 1993 (aged 15)		(Spain) FC Barcelona
18		Jackson Bengon A. Bengon	9 June 1992 (aged 16)		(Cameroon) Student Academy

== Niger ==
Coach: Frederic Acosta

No.	Pos.	Player	Date of birth (age)	Caps	Club
1		Boubacar Alexis Yaou	23 January 1992 (aged 17)		(Niger) AS Police
2		Yahaya Issaka	21 February 1992 (aged 17)		(Niger) Akokana FC
3		Sani Bawa Mahamane	6 June 1992 (aged 16)		(Niger) Sahel SC
4		Alfa Djibo Souley	20 October 1992 (aged 16)		(Niger) AS-FNIS
5		Abdou Moumouni Boua	13 November 1992 (aged 16)		(Niger) ASFAN
6		Mounkaila Parfait Gameley	22 January 1992 (aged 17)		(Niger) Sahel SC
7		Bello Chaibou	28 October 1992 (aged 16)		(Niger) AS-FNIS
8		Mahamadou Boureima. O.	30 March 1992 (aged 16)		(Niger) ASN Nigelec
9		Abdoulaye Ousmane	20 March 1992 (aged 16)		(Niger) AS Police
10		Issa Modibo Sidibé	3 June 1992 (aged 16)		(Niger) Akokana FC
11		Boubacar Talatou (Note: Player was in fact 22 years of age. When this was discovered Niger's results were expunged from the competition)	2 March 1992 (aged 16)		(Niger) AS-FNIS
12		Amadou Hassane	20 September 1993 (aged 15)		(Niger) AS Police
13		Amadou Moutari	19 January 1994 (aged 15)		(Niger) Aïr Football Académie Arlit
14		Mohamed Bachar	11 June 1992 (aged 16)		(Niger) Akokana FC
15		Hassane Aliou	6 February 1992 (aged 17)		(Niger) Sahel SC
16		Moussa Alzouma	11 March 1992 (aged 16)		(Niger) Sahel SC
17		Ide Abdoulaziz	20 January 1992 (aged 17)		(Niger) Olympic FC
18		Inoussa Hassane Djibó	6 June 1992 (aged 16)		(Niger) Olympic FC

== Zimbabwe ==
Coach: Rodwell Dhlakama

No.	Pos.	Player	Date of birth (age)	Caps	Club
1		Kennedy Namion Chirwa	27 August 1992 (aged 16)		(Zimbabwe) Hunter FC
2		Proud Zireni	9 December 1992 (aged 16)		(Zimbabwe) Mzilikazi High School
3		Edwin Nkomo	9 March 1992 (aged 16)		(Zimbabwe) Bantu Rovers
4		Tinashe Mugadzaweta	21 February 1993 (aged 16)		(Zimbabwe) Mufakose High School
5		Pride Zivengwa	5 April 1992 (aged 16)		(Zimbabwe) Chapungu United F.C.
6		Tinovimba Muskwe	1 January 1994 (aged 15)		(Zimbabwe) Prince Edward High School
7		Kevin Moyo	3 April 1993 (aged 15)		(Zimbabwe) Mzilikazi High School
8		Welcome Nyathi	8 May 1992 (aged 16)		(Zimbabwe) Sparrows FC
9		Malvern Burombo	19 May 1992 (aged 16)		(Zimbabwe) Prince Edward High School
10		Temptation Chiwunga	10 March 1992 (aged 16)		(Zimbabwe) Douglas Warriors FC
11		Talent Chawapiwa	3 June 1992 (aged 16)		(Zimbabwe) Prince Edward High School
12		Takunda Sadiki	2 February 1992 (aged 17)		(Zimbabwe) Prince Edward High School
13		Elijah Soko	7 June 1992 (aged 16)		(Zimbabwe) St Georges High School
14		Nigel Gandari	3 June 1992 (aged 16)		(Zimbabwe) Prince Edward High School
15		Brassington Muchegwa	5 July 1993 (aged 15)		(Zimbabwe) Gateway High School
16		Russel Chiripamberi	11 September 1992 (aged 16)		(Zimbabwe) Gateway High School
17		Ray Lunga	28 February 1993 (aged 16)		(Zimbabwe) Mzilikazi High School
18		Elvis Moyo	3 April 1993 (aged 15)		(Zimbabwe) Mzilikazi High School
