= 2017–18 US Biskra season =

US Biskra
2017–18 season
- Chairman: Brahim Saou
- Head coach: Omar Belatoui (from 4 July 2017) (until 21 October 2017); Nadir Leknaoui (from 13 November 2017)
- Ligue 1: 14th
- Algerian Cup: Round of 16
- Top goalscorer: League: Yasser Berbache (6); All: Yasser Berbache (7)

In the 2017–18 season, US Biskra is competing in the Ligue 1 for the 2nd season, as well as the Algerian Cup.

== Competitions ==
=== Overview ===
Competition	Record								Started round	Final position / round	First match	Last match
Competition	G	W	D	L	GF	GA	GD	Win %	Started round	Final position / round	First match	Last match
Ligue 1	30	9	7	14	23	30	−7	30.00	—N/a	14th	25 August 2017	19 May 2018
Algerian Cup	3	2	0	1	5	2	+3	66.67	Round of 64	Round of 16	30 December 2017	3 February 2018
Total	33	11	7	15	28	32	−4	33.33				

Updated to match played 9 May 2017
Source: Competitions

== League table ==
Pos	Team	Pld	W	D	L	GF	GA	GD	Pts	Qualification or relegation
12	CR Belouizdad	30	7	15	8	24	27	−3	36 (Note: Ranked on head-to-head results.)	
13	Olympique de Médéa	30	8	12	10	23	32	−9	36	
14	US Biskra (R)	30	9	7	14	23	30	−7	34	Relegation to Algerian Ligue Professionnelle 2
15	USM El Harrach (R)	30	7	7	16	27	37	−10	28	Relegation to Algerian Ligue Professionnelle 2
16	USM Blida (R)	30	5	8	17	28	50	−22	23	Relegation to Algerian Ligue Professionnelle 2

Updated to match(es) played on 19 May 2018. Source: DZFoot
Rules for classification: 1) points; 2) head-to-head points; 3) head-to-head goal difference; 4) goal difference; 5) total goals; 6) fairplay ranking; 7) playoff.
(R) Relegated

=== Results summary ===
Overall								Home						Away					
Pld	W	D	L	GF	GA	GD	Pts	W	D	L	GF	GA	GD	W	D	L	GF	GA	GD
30	9	7	14	23	30	−7	34	8	4	3	19	8	+11	1	3	11	4	22	−18

Last updated: 30 January 2016.
Source: Competitive matches

=== Results by round ===
Round	1	2	3	4	5	6	7	8	9	10	11	12	13	14	15	16	17	18	19	20	21	22	23	24	25	26	27	28	29	30
Ground	H	A	A	H	A	H	A	H	A	H	A	H	A	H	A	A	H	H	A	H	A	H	A	H	A	H	A	H	A	H
Result	L	L	L	D	W	L	L	D	D	W	L	D	L	W	L	L	W	W	L	W	L	L	L	D	D	W	L	W	D	W
Position	13	14	14	14	13	14	14	14	15	13	14	14	14	13	14	15	15	12	13	11	12	12	13	15	15	14	14	14	14	14

Source: Competitive matches
A = Away; H = Home; W = Win; D = Draw; L = Loss

=== Matches ===
Win Draw Loss

25 August 2017 Round 1	US Biskra	0–1	MC Alger	Biskra
17:00		Soccerway report Live TV: Canal Algérie / TV Tamazight 4	25' Nekkache	Stadium: El Alia Sports Complex; Referee: Mohamed Saïdi

9 September 2017 Round 2	JS Saoura	2–0	US Biskra	Béchar
20:45	Djemaouni 17' (pen.); Bourdim 74'	Soccerway report Live TV: Algérie 3		Stadium: Stade 20 Août 1955; Referee: Amine Hansal

16 September 2017 Round 3	ES Sétif	1–0	US Biskra	Sétif
17:45	Djabou 23' (pen.)	Soccerway report Live TV: Algérie 3		Stadium: Stade 8 Mai 1945; Referee: Abderrezzak Arab; Man of the Match: Saad

23 September 2017 Round 4	US Biskra	0–0	CR Belouizdad	Biskra
17:00		Soccerway report Live TV: None		Stadium: El Alia Sports Complex; Referee: Mustapha Ghorbal

29 September 2017 Round 5	Olympique de Médéa	1–2	US Biskra	Médéa
16:00	Bahi 49'	Soccerway report Live TV: Algérie 3	24' (pen.) Rachedi; 73' El Okbi	Stadium: Stade Imam Lyes de Médéa; Referee: Hamza Bouslimani

13 October 2017 Round 6	US Biskra	1–2	CS Constantine	Biskra
16:00	Bagili 86'	Soccerway report Live TV: None	36', 59' Abid	Stadium: El Alia Sports Complex; Referee: Mustapha Bessiri

5 December 2017 Round 7	USM Alger	2–0	US Biskra	Bologhine
17:00	Darfalou 16'; Boumechra 74'	Soccerway report Live TV: None		Stadium: Omar Hamadi Stadium; Attendance: 0 (close doors); Referee: Farouk Mial

21 October 2017 Round 8	US Biskra	2–2	MC Oran	Biskra
16:00	Berbache 15'; El Okbi 32' (pen.)	Soccerway report Live TV: None	19', 67' (pen.) Tiaïba	Stadium: El Alia Sports Complex; Referee: Lyés Bekouassa

27 October 2017 Round 9	JS Kabylie	0–0	US Biskra	Tizi Ouzou
16:00		Soccerway report Live TV: None		Stadium: November 1, 1954 Stadium; Referee: Mohamed Saïdi

3 November 2017 Round 10	US Biskra	2–0	USM Blida	Biskra
15:00	Labani 44'; El Okbi 90'	Soccerway report Live TV: None		Stadium: El Alia Sports Complex; Referee: Missoum Benabdellah

9 November 2017 Round 11	Paradou AC	1–0	US Biskra	Bologhine
17:00	Benyoucef 46'	Soccerway report Live TV: TV Tamazight 4		Stadium: Omar Hamadi Stadium; Referee: Merzoug Brahimi

18 November 2017 Round 12	US Biskra	0–0	NA Hussein Dey	Biskra
15:00		Soccerway report Live TV: None		Stadium: El Alia Sports Complex; Referee: Nabil Boukhalfa

1 December 2017 Round 13	DRB Tadjenanet	3–1	US Biskra	Tadjenanet
16:00	Demane 36', 61'; Khaled 45+1'	Soccerway report Live TV: None	30' Rachedi	Stadium: Lahoua Smaïl Stadium; Referee: Hamza Bouslimani

9 December 2017 Round 14	US Biskra	2–1	USM Bel-Abbès	Biskra
15:00	Berbache 3'; Chaouti 69'	Soccerway report Live TV: None	13' Khali	Stadium: El Alia Sports Complex; Referee: Ahmed Bouzrar

16 December 2017 Round 15	USM El Harrach	1–0	US Biskra	Algiers
15:00	Benrokia 35'	Soccerway report Live TV: None		Stadium: Stade 1er Novembre 1954; Referee: Lahlou Benbraham

6 January 2018 Round 16	MC Alger	2–0	US Biskra	Algiers
16:00	Bendebka 19'; Hachoud 79'	Soccerway report Live TV: None		Stadium: July 5, 1962 Stadium; Referee: Boubekeur Zouaoui

19 January 2018 Round 17	US Biskra	1–0	JS Saoura	Biskra
15:00	Kangou 20'	Soccerway report Live TV: None		Stadium: El Alia Sports Complex; Referee: Ahmed Bouzrar

25 January 2018 Round 18	US Biskra	1–0	ES Sétif	Biskra
16:00	El Okbi 57' (pen.)	Soccerway report Live TV: Canal Algérie		Stadium: El Alia Sports Complex; Referee: Merzak Halalchi

6 February 2018 Round 19	CR Belouizdad	1–0	US Biskra	Belouizdad
18:00	Bellaili 90+2'	Soccerway report Live TV: None		Stadium: Stade 20 Août 1955; Referee: Missoum Benabdellah

15 February 2018 Round 20	US Biskra	2–0	Olympique de Médéa	Biskra
16:00	Maanser 19'; Berbache 29'	Soccerway report Live TV: Canal Algérie		Stadium: El Alia Sports Complex; Referee: Lotfi Bekouassa

23 February 2018 Round 21	CS Constantine	1–0	US Biskra	Constantine
17:00	Abid 5'	Soccerway report Live TV: None		Stadium: Stade Mohamed Hamlaoui; Attendance: 0 (close doors); Referee: Farouk Mial

2 March 2018 Round 22	US Biskra	0–1	USM Alger	Biskra
16:00		Soccerway report Live TV: None	64' Benkhemassa	Stadium: El Alia Sports Complex; Referee: Mohamed Saïdi

17 March 2018 Round 23	MC Oran	5–0	US Biskra	Oran
16:00	Tiaïba 11', 65'; Chibane 38' (pen.), 45+3'; Gharbi 72'	Soccerway report Live TV: EPTV Terrestre / TV Tamazight 4		Stadium: Ahmed Zabana Stadium; Referee: Abderrezzak Arab

30 March 2018 Round 24	US Biskra	1–1	JS Kabylie	Biskra
16:00	El Okbi 51' (pen.)	Soccerway report Live TV: None	68' Benaldjia	Stadium: El Alia Sports Complex; Referee: Mustapha Bessiri

7 April 2018 Round 25	USM Blida	0–0	US Biskra	Blida
16:00		Soccerway report Live TV: None		Stadium: Brakni Brothers Stadium; Referee: Abderrazek Hallalchi

20 April 2018 Round 26	US Biskra	1–0	Paradou AC	Biskra
16:00	Boufligha 80'	Soccerway report Live TV: None		Stadium: El Alia Sports Complex; Referee: Redouane Necib

24 April 2018 Round 27	NA Hussein Dey	2–1	US Biskra	Belouizdad
16:00	Gasmi 14'; Chouiter 68'	Soccerway report Live TV: None	27' (o.g.) Laribi	Stadium: Stade 20 Août 1955; Referee: Missoum Benabdellah

4 May 2018 Round 28	US Biskra	4–0	DRB Tadjenanet	Biskra
16:00	Mouaki Dadi 13'; Berbache 37'; Kangou 75'; Touré 87'	Soccerway report Live TV: None		Stadium: El Alia Sports Complex; Attendance: 0 (close doors); Referee: Mustapha Ghorbal

12 May 2018 Round 29	USM Bel Abbès	0–0	US Biskra	Sidi Bel Abbès
16:00		Soccerway report Live TV: None		Stadium: Stade 24 Fevrier 1956; Referee: Redouane Necib

19 May 2018 Round 30	US Biskra	2–0	USM El Harrach	Biskra
16:00	Berbache 9', 29'	Soccerway report Live TV: None		Stadium: El Alia Sports Complex; Referee: Ramdane Oukil

== Algerian Cup ==
30 December 2017 Round of 64	US Biskra	3–0	JSM Skikda	Biskra
14:00	El Okbi 2'; Farhi 40'; Berbache 57'	Report; Live TV: None		Stadium: El Alia Sports Complex; Referee: Boubekeur Zouaoui

13 January 2018 Round of 32	US Biskra	1–0	USM El Harrach	Biskra
14:00	Yokkoub Anani 40'	Report; Live TV: None		Stadium: El Alia Sports Complex; Referee: Mohamed Saïdi

3 February 2018 Round of 16	USM Bel-Abbès	2–1	US Biskra	Sidi Bel Abbès
16:00	Khali 7'; Benabderahmane 71'	[ Report] Live TV: EPTV Terrestre	47' El Hocine	Stadium: Stade 24 Fevrier 1956; Referee: Bahloul

== Squad information ==
=== Playing statistics ===
No.	Pos	Nat	Player	Total		Ligue 1		Algerian Cup	
No.	Pos	Nat	Player	Apps	Goals	Apps	Goals	Apps	Goals
Goalkeepers
16	GK	(Algeria) ALG	Cédric Si Mohamed	14	0	14	0	0	0
30	GK	(Algeria) ALG	Fares Belkerrouche	16	0	16	0	0	0
Defenders
5	DF	(Algeria) ALG	Farid Mellouli	9	0	9	0	0	0
2	DF	(Algeria) ALG	Mohamed Yaghni	9	0	9	0	0	0
6	DF	(Algeria) ALG	Youcef Benamara	20	0	20	0	0	0
	DF	(Algeria) ALG	Kamel Allam	13	0	13	0	0	0
13	DF	(Algeria) ALG	Ishak Bouda	9	0	9	0	0	0
3	DF	(Algeria) ALG	Omar Mebarki	14	0	14	0	0	0
15	DF	(Algeria) ALG	Abdellah Bencheikh	2	0	2	0	0	0
	DF	(Algeria) ALG	Fayçal Kherifi	14	0	14	0	0	0
25	DF	(Algeria) ALG	Amar Djabou	17	0	17	0	0	0
14	DF	(Algeria) ALG	Mohamed Ikbal Boufligha	16	2	16	2	0	0
12	DF	(Algeria) ALG	Kamel Hamidi	3	0	3	0	0	0
	DF	(Algeria) ALG	Mohamed Assil Sioued	5	0	5	0	0	0
	DF	(Algeria) ALG	Oussama Addouane	1	0	1	0	0	0
Midfielders
10	MF	(Algeria) ALG	Hacène El Okbi	21	5	21	5	0	0
18	MF	(Algeria) ALG	Hichem Maanser	20	1	20	1	0	0
23	MF	(Algeria) ALG	Ali Amiri	6	0	6	0	0	0
	MF	(Mali) MLI	Malick Touré	8	1	8	1	0	0
19	MF	(Algeria) ALG	Abdelhak Benaniba	23	0	23	0	0	0
47	MF	(Algeria) ALG	Ibrahim Farhi	19	0	19	0	0	0
8	MF	(Algeria) ALG	Houd Ahmed Taha Djoghma	15	0	15	0	0	0
26	MF	(Algeria) ALG	Mustapha Bengrina	10	0	10	0	0	0
	MF	(Algeria) ALG	Daïaeddine Goudjil	1	0	1	0	0	0
48	MF	(Algeria) ALG	Oussama Gourari	1	0	1	0	0	0
4	MF	(Algeria) ALG	Tayeb Hammoudi	21	0	21	0	0	0
	MF	(Algeria) ALG	El Hocine Mouaki Dadi	12	1	12	1	0	0
	MF	(Algeria) ALG	Yaâkoub Anani	3	0	3	0	0	0
Forwards
28	FW	(Algeria) ALG	Bassem Chaouti	9	1	9	1	0	0
27	FW	(Algeria) ALG	Djamel Hadji	9	0	9	0	0	0
24	FW	(Algeria) ALG	Yasser Berbache	25	6	25	6	0	0
21	FW	(Algeria) ALG	Karim Rachedi	8	1	8	1	0	0
11	FW	(Algeria) ALG	Mohamed Khalfaoui	2	0	2	0	0	0
	FW	(Republic of the Congo) CGO	Ronel Kangou	13	2	13	2	0	0
49	FW	(Algeria) ALG	Salim Bennai	4	0	4	0	0	0
Players transferred out during the season
20	MF	(Algeria) ALG	Yahia Labani	11	1	11	1	0	0
22	FW	(Mauritania) MTN	Boubacar Bagili	7	1	7	1	0	0
9	FW	(Mauritania) MTN	Abdoulaye Sy	7	0	7	0	0	0

Last updated: 13 June 2018
Source: fr.soccerway.com

== Squad list ==
As of August 25, 2017. Note: Flags indicate national team as defined under FIFA eligibility rules; some limited exceptions apply. Players may hold more than one non-FIFA nationality.

No.	Pos.	Nation	Player
2	DF	ALG	Mohamed Yaghni
3	DF	ALG	Omar Mebarki
4	MF	ALG	Tayeb Hammoudi
5	DF	ALG	Farid Mellouli (captain)
6	DF	ALG	Youcef Benamara
7	FW	ALG	Mouaki Dadi El Hocine
8	MF	ALG	Houd Ahmed Taha Djoghma
9	FW	MTN	Abdoulaye Sy
10	MF	ALG	Hacène El Okbi
11	FW	ALG	Mohamed Khalfaoui
12	DF	ALG	Kamel Hamidi
13	FW	ALG	Ishak Bouda
14	DF	ALG	Mohamed Ikbal Boufligha
15	MF	ALG	Abdellah Bencheikh
16	GK	ALG	Cédric Si Mohamed
18	MF	ALG	Hichem Maanser

No.	Pos.	Nation	Player
19	MF	ALG	Abdelhak Benaniba
20	MF	ALG	Yahia Labani
21	FW	ALG	Karim Rachedi
22	FW	MTN	Boubacar Bagili
23	MF	ALG	Ali Amiri
24	FW	ALG	Yasser Berbache (on loan from ES Setif)
25	MF	ALG	Amar Djabou
26	MF	ALG	Mustapha Bengrina (on loan from USM Alger)
27	FW	ALG	Djamel Hadji
28	MF	ALG	Bassem Chaouti
30	GK	ALG	Fares Belkerrouche
40	GK	ALG	Abderrahmane Amri
47	FW	ALG	Ibrahim Farhi (on loan from USM Alger)
48	MF	ALG	Oussama Gourari
49	DF	ALG	Salim Bennai

== Transfers ==
=== In ===
Date	Pos	Player	From club	Transfer fee	Source
1 July 2017	MF	(Algeria) Abdallah Bencheikh	MC Oran	Free transfer	
1 July 2017	DF	(Algeria) Kamel Hamidi	SCM Oran	Free transfer	
1 July 2017	DF	(Algeria) Chaouti	A Bou Saada	Free transfer	
5 July 2017	GK	(Algeria) Cédric Si Mohamed	CS Constantine	Free transfer	
28 July 2017	MF	(Algeria) Mustapha Bengrina	(Algeria) USM Alger	Loan	
28 July 2017	MF	(Algeria) Ibrahim Farhi	(Algeria) USM Alger	Loan	
July 2017	DF	(Algeria) Mohamed Yaghni	(Algeria) USM Bel-Abbès	Free transfer	
July 2017	DF	(Algeria) Farid Mellouli	(Algeria) ES Sétif	Free transfer	
July 2017	DF	(Algeria) Youcef Benamara	NA Hussein Dey	Free transfer	
July 2017	FW	(Algeria) Nadir Bendahmane	(France) FC Rousset	Free transfer	
July 2017	MF	(Mauritania) Boubacar Bagili	(Mauritania) Ksar Nouakchott	Free transfer	
July 2017	FW	(Mauritania) Abdellah Sy	(Mauritania) ?	Free transfer	
July 2017	MF	(Algeria) Hacène El Okbi	(Morocco) MC Oujda	Free transfer	
July 2017	MF	(Algeria) Abdelhak Benaniba	(France) US Créteil	Free transfer	

=== Out ===
Date	Pos	Player	To club	Transfer fee	Source
July 2017	MF	(Algeria) Walid Alati	NA Hussein Dey	Free transfer	
July 2017	DF	(Algeria) Ibrahim Ferhat	NA Hussein Dey	Free transfer	
3 July 2017	FW	(Algeria) Adil Djabout	JS Kabylie	Free transfer	
21 December 2017	MF	(Mauritania) Boubacar Bagili	?	Free transfer (Released)	
21 December 2017	FW	(Mauritania) Abdellah Sy	?	Free transfer (Released)	
13 January 2018	MF	(Algeria) Yahia Labani	USM Bel-Abbès	Free transfer	
