= 2007 Cameroonian Premier League =

Cameroonian Premier League
- Champions: Cotonsport Garoua

In the 2007 Cameroonian Premier League season, 18 teams competed. Cotonsport Garoua won the championship.

== League standings ==
Pos	Team	Pld	W	D	L	GF	GA	GD	Pts
1	Cotonsport Garoua (C)	34	22	9	3	55	11	+44	75
2	Union Douala	34	20	10	4	50	23	+27	70
3	Mount Cameroon	34	19	9	6	47	23	+24	66
4	Fovu Baham	34	15	9	10	33	24	+9	54
5	Canon Yaoundé	34	16	6	12	37	26	+11	54
6	Les Astres	34	12	15	7	42	34	+8	51
7	Aigle Royal Menoua	34	11	16	7	29	27	+2	49
8	International Lion Ngoma d'Ebolowa	34	12	11	11	26	32	−6	47
9	Tonnerre Yaoundé	34	11	14	9	28	24	+4	47
10	Université	34	13	7	14	40	35	+5	46
11	FS d'Akonolinga	34	11	9	14	32	37	−5	42
12	Espérance	34	11	9	14	23	31	−8	42
13	Sable	34	12	6	16	31	37	−6	39 (Note: 3 points deducted.)
14	Cetef Bonabéri (R)	34	9	9	16	35	43	−8	36
15	Sahel (R)	34	6	13	15	24	43	−19	31
16	Fédéral Noun (R)	34	6	8	20	26	50	−24	23
17	CPS Bertoua (R)	34	0	10	24	17	67	−50	7
–	Bamboutos (R)	34	12	6	16	31	39	−8	42 (Note: Removed from the competition and relegated two levels for attempted bribery. All remaining matches were awarded to opponents with a score of 0–3.)

Source: rsssf.com
(C) Champions; (R) Relegated
