= 2018–19 MO Béjaïa season =

MO Béjaïa
2018–19 season
- Head coach: Alain Michel (from 13 June 2018)
- Stadium: Stade de l'Unité Maghrébine, Béjaïa
- Ligue 1: 14th
- Algerian Cup: Round of 32
- Top goalscorer: League: Abdelhakim Amokrane (6); All: Abdelhakim Amokrane (6)

In the 2018–19 season, MO Béjaïa is competing in the Ligue 1 for the 5th season, as well as the Algerian Cup.

== Squad list ==
Players and squad numbers last updated on 19 August 2016.
Note: Flags indicate national team as has been defined under FIFA eligibility rules. Players may hold more than one non-FIFA nationality.

No.	Nat.	Position	Name	Date of birth (age)	Signed from
Goalkeepers
Defenders
Midfielders
Forwards

== Competitions ==
=== Overview ===
Competition	Record								Started round	Final position / round	First match	Last match
Competition	G	W	D	L	GF	GA	GD	Win %	Started round	Final position / round	First match	Last match
Ligue 1	30	7	12	11	23	36	−13	23.33	—N/a	14th	11 August 2018	26 May 2019
Algerian Cup	2	1	0	1	2	1	+1	50.00	Round of 64	Round of 32	18 December 2018	29 December 2018
Total	0	0	0	0	0	0	+0	—				

Updated to match played 28 May 2018
Source: Competitions

== League table ==
Pos	Team	Pld	W	D	L	GF	GA	GD	Pts	Qualification or relegation
12	AS Aïn M'lila	30	7	15	8	20	30	−10	36 (Note: Head-to-head: MC Oran 7 points; NA Hussein Dey 5 points; AS Aïn M'lila 3 points.)	
13	USM Bel Abbès	30	9	8	13	24	39	−15	35	
14	MO Béjaïa (R)	30	7	12	11	23	36	−13	33	Relegation to Ligue 2
15	DRB Tadjenanet (R)	30	7	10	13	26	38	−12	31 (Note: Head-to-head: DRB Tadjenanet 4 points; Olympique de Médéa 1 point.)	Relegation to Ligue 2
16	Olympique de Médéa (R)	30	7	10	13	21	31	−10	31	Relegation to Ligue 2

Source: DZFoot
Rules for classification: 1) points; 2) head-to-head points; 3) head-to-head goal difference; 4) goal difference; 5) total goals; 6) fairplay ranking; 7) playoff.
(R) Relegated

=== Results summary ===
Overall								Home						Away					
Pld	W	D	L	GF	GA	GD	Pts	W	D	L	GF	GA	GD	W	D	L	GF	GA	GD
30	7	12	11	23	36	−13	33	5	7	3	11	11	0	2	5	8	12	25	−13

Last updated: 28 May 2018.
Source: Competitive matches

=== Results by round ===
Round	1	2	3	4	5	6	7	8	9	10	11	12	13	14	15	16	17	18	19	20	21	22	23	24	25	26	27	28	29	30
Ground	A	H	A	H	A	H	A	H	A	A	H	A	H	A	H	H	A	H	A	H	A	H	A	H	H	A	H	A	H	A
Result	W	D	D	W	L	L	D	L	L	D	D	L	D	L	W	D	L	L	L	D	L	D	D	D	W	L	W	D	W	L
Position	3	3	3	3	8	8	8	11	7	8	8	11	11	12	10	9	11	13	15	13	15	15	15	15	14	15	15	16	14	14

Updated to match(es) played on 16 May 2019. Source: Competitive matches
A = Away; H = Home; W = Win; D = Draw; L = Loss

=== Matches ===
Win Draw Loss

11 August 2018 Round 1	Olympique de Médéa	2–4	MO Béjaïa	Médéa
17:00	Chekhrit 53'; Sameur 56' (pen.)	Soccerway report	Semahi 40'; Touré 68'; Amokrane 72'; Kadri 90+1' (pen.)	Stadium: Stade Imam Lyes de Médéa; Referee: Lyés Bekouassa

17 August 2018 Round 2	MO Béjaïa	1–1	JS Kabylie	Béjaïa
17:45	Kadri 9'	Soccerway report	Benaldjia 24' (pen.)	Stadium: Stade de l'Unité Maghrébine; Referee: Said Aouina

28 August 2018 Round 3	MC Oran	0–0	MO Béjaïa	Oran
19:00		Soccerway report		Stadium: Ahmed Zabana Stadium; Referee: Hamza Bouslimani

1 September 2018 Round 4	MO Béjaïa	1–0	CS Constantine	Béjaïa
17:45	Dahar 10'	Soccerway report		Stadium: Stade de l'Unité Maghrébine; Referee: Nabil Boukhalfa

15 September 2018 Round 6	MO Béjaïa	1–2	NA Hussein Dey	Béjaïa
17:45	Amokrane 90'	Soccerway report	Alati 55', 63'	Stadium: Stade de l'Unité Maghrébine; Referee: Abderrezzak Arab

21 September 2018 Round 7	CA Bordj Bou Arreridj	1–1	MO Béjaïa	Bordj Bou Arréridj
17:45	Meftahi 2'	Soccerway report	Amokrane 7'	Stadium: Stade 20 Août 1955; Referee: Hamza Bouslimani

29 September 2018 Round 8	MO Béjaïa	0–1	JS Saoura	Béjaïa
17:45		Soccerway report	Djallit 48'	Stadium: Stade de l'Unité Maghrébine; Referee: Mohamed Saïdi

5 October 2018 Round 9	DRB Tadjenanet	1–2	MO Béjaïa	Tadjenanet
16:00	Aribi 45' (pen.)	Soccerway report	Dahar 49' (pen.); Amokrane 55'	Stadium: Lahoua Smaïl Stadium; Referee: Mustapha Ghorbal

9 October 2018 Round 10	USM Bel Abbès	2–2	MO Béjaïa	Sidi Bel Abbès
16:00	Bellahouel 14', 78'	Soccerway report	Touré 53', 68'	Stadium: Stade 24 Fevrier 1956; Referee: Rafik Achouri

15 October 2018 Round 5	USM Alger	5–1	MO Béjaïa	Bologhine
17:45	Meziane 19', 56'; Koudri 46'; Yaya 52' (pen.); Benguit 90'	Soccerway report	Dahar 67' (pen.)	Stadium: Omar Hamadi Stadium; Referee: Abderrezzak Arab

20 October 2018 Round 11	MO Béjaïa	0–0	AS Ain M'lila	Béjaïa
17:45		Soccerway report		Stadium: Stade de l'Unité Maghrébine; Referee: Lyés Bekouassa

30 October 2018 Round 12	Paradou AC	3–0	MO Béjaïa	Bologhine
18:00	Benayad 34', 63'; Naidji 53'	Soccerway report		Stadium: Omar Hamadi Stadium; Referee: Redouane Necib

10 November 2018 Round 14	CR Belouizdad	4–1	MO Béjaïa	Belouizdad
16:00	Nessakh 18'; Djerrar 29'; Bechou 86'; Balegh 88'	Soccerway report	Amokrane 90+1'	Stadium: Stade 20 Août 1955; Referee: Nabil Boukhalfa

17 November 2018 Round 13	MO Béjaïa	1–1	MC Alger	Béjaïa
18:00	Kadri 36' (pen.)	Soccerway report	Nekkache 29'	Stadium: Stade de l'Unité Maghrébine; Referee: Mustapha Bessiri

22 November 2018 Round 15	MO Béjaïa	1–0	ES Sétif	Béjaïa
18:00	Dahar 62'	Soccerway report		Stadium: Stade de l'Unité Maghrébine; Referee: Hamza Bouslimani

4 January 2019 Round 16	MO Béjaïa	1–1	Olympique de Médéa	Béjaïa
15:00	Bouldiab 81'	Soccerway report	Baouche 71'	Stadium: Stade de l'Unité Maghrébine; Referee: Rafik Achouri

11 January 2019 Round 17	JS Kabylie	1–0	MO Béjaïa	Tizi Ouzou
17:45	Hamroune 16'	Soccerway report		Stadium: November 1, 1954 Stadium; Referee: Lotfi Bekouassa

18 January 2019 Round 18	MO Béjaïa	0–3	MC Oran	Béjaïa
16:00		Soccerway report	Nadji 13', 28'; Ali Guechi 82' (o.g.)	Stadium: Stade de l'Unité Maghrébine; Referee: Lyés Bekouassa

27 January 2019 Round 19	CS Constantine	1–0	MO Béjaïa	Constantine
17:00	Debbari 20' (o.g.)	Soccerway report		Stadium: Stade Mohamed Hamlaoui; Referee: Mustapha Bessiri

5 February 2019 Round 20	MO Béjaïa	0–0	USM Alger	Béjaïa
17:00		Soccerway report		Stadium: Stade de l'Unité Maghrébine; Referee: Mehdi Abid Charef

12 February 2019 Round 22	MO Béjaïa	0–0	CA Bordj Bou Arreridj	Béjaïa
17:00		Soccerway report		Stadium: Stade de l'Unité Maghrébine; Referee: Missoum Benabdellah

2 March 2019 Round 23	JS Saoura	0–0	MO Béjaïa	Béchar
18:00		Soccerway report		Stadium: Stade 20 Août 1955; Referee: Mohamed Saïdi

14 March 2019 Round 24	MO Béjaïa	2–2	DRB Tadjenanet	Béjaïa
17:00	Bessan 7'; Touré 35'	Soccerway report	Bensaha 11'; Dellahi 73'	Stadium: Stade de l'Unité Maghrébine; Attendance: 0 (close doors); Referee: Nabil Boukhalfa

1 April 2019 Round 25	MO Béjaïa	1–0	USM Bel Abbès	Béjaïa
18:00	Touré 59'	Soccerway report		Stadium: Stade de l'Unité Maghrébine; Referee: Amine Sekhraoui

6 April 2019 Round 21	NA Hussein Dey	1–0	MO Béjaïa	Belouizdad
16:00	Yaya 38'	Soccerway report		Stadium: Stade 20 Août 1955; Referee: Mehdi Abid Charef

21 April 2019 Round 26	AS Ain M'lila	2–1	MO Béjaïa	Aïn M'lila
16:00	Tiaiba 76', 90+3'	Soccerway report	Bessan 62'	Stadium: Stade Khelifi Touhami Zoubir; Attendance: 0 (close doors); Referee: Abderrezzak Arab

11 May 2019 Round 27	MO Béjaïa	1–0	Paradou AC	Béjaïa
22:30	Mazari 80'	Soccerway report		Stadium: Stade de l'Unité Maghrébine; Referee: Mehdi Abid Charef

16 May 2019 Round 28	MC Alger	0–0	MO Béjaïa	Algiers
22:30		Soccerway report		Stadium: July 5, 1962 Stadium; Referee: Nabil Boukhalfa

21 May 2019 Round 29	MO Béjaïa	1–0	CR Belouizdad	Béjaïa
22:30	Amokrane 68'	Soccerway report		Stadium: Stade de l'Unité Maghrébine; Referee: Rafik Achouri

26 May 2019 Round 30	ES Sétif	2–0	MO Béjaïa	Sétif
22:30	Aiboud 55'; Draoui 82'	Soccerway report		Stadium: Stade 8 Mai 1945; Referee: Lotfi Bekouassa

== Algerian Cup ==
18 December 2018 Round of 64	MO Béjaïa	2–0	Olympique Magran	Béjaïa
18:00	Boukhanchouche 43' (pen.); Soltani 90'			Stadium: Stade de l'Unité Maghrébine; Referee: Maskri

29 December 2018 Round of 32	USM El Harrach	1–0 (a.e.t.)	MO Béjaïa	El Harrach
15:00	Fares Benabderrahmane 109'}			Stadium: 1 November 1954 Stadium

== Squad information ==
=== Playing statistics ===
No.	Pos	Nat	Player	Total		Ligue 1		Algerian Cup	
No.	Pos	Nat	Player	Apps	Goals	Apps	Goals	Apps	Goals
Goalkeepers
1	GK	(Algeria) ALG	Ali Bencherif	9	0	9	0	0	0
16	GK	(Algeria) ALG	Athmane Toual	24	0	22	0	2	0
Defenders
13	DF	(Algeria) ALG	Abdelaziz Ali Guechi	7	0	7	0	0	0
31	DF	(Algeria) ALG	Kamel Aouali	9	0	9	0	0	0
3	DF	(Algeria) ALG	Ilies Bouheniche	9	0	7	0	2	0
15	DF	(Algeria) ALG	Billel Bouldiab	18	1	18	1	0	0
19	DF	(Algeria) ALG	Abdelhak Debbari	28	0	26	0	2	0
	DF	(Algeria) ALG	Yacine Guendouz	1	0	1	0	0	0
5	DF	(Algeria) ALG	Arslane Mazari	26	1	24	1	2	0
22	DF	(Algeria) ALG	Mohamed Naâs Laraba	19	0	19	0	0	0
Midfielders
27	MF	(Algeria) ALG	Sofiane Aibout	22	0	20	0	2	0
8	MF	(Algeria) ALG	Mohamed Bentiba	5	0	5	0	0	0
	MF	(Algeria) ALG	Salim Boukhenchouche	10	1	8	0	2	1
23	MF	(Algeria) ALG	Merouane Dahar	23	4	23	4	0	0
17	MF	(Algeria) ALG	Bouazza Feham	14	0	14	0	0	0
18	MF	(Algeria) ALG	Youcef Islam Herida	15	0	15	0	0	0
20	MF	(Algeria) ALG	Ahmed Kadous	16	0	14	0	2	0
21	MF	(Algeria) ALG	Billal Ouali	25	0	23	0	2	0
11	MF	(Mali) MLI	Malick Touré	28	5	27	5	1	0
Forwards
12	FW	(Algeria) ALG	Abdelhakim Amokrane	23	6	23	6	0	0
29	FW	(Benin) BEN	Jacques Bessan	12	2	12	2	0	0
7	FW	(Algeria) ALG	Mehdi Kadri	17	3	15	3	2	0
9	FW	(Algeria) ALG	Khalil Semahi	25	1	23	1	2	0
25	FW	(Algeria) ALG	Amir Soltane	16	0	14	0	2	0
14	FW	(Algeria) ALG	Kamel Soltani	17	1	15	0	2	1
28	FW	(Algeria) ALG	Mohamed Nadjib Touati	3	0	3	0	0	0
Players transferred out during the season
	MF	(Algeria) ALG	Reda Bellahcene	11	0	10	0	1	0
10	FW	(Mali) MLI	Moussa Camara	7	0	7	0	0	0
	DF	(Algeria) ALG	Anis Mouhli	3	0	3	0	0	0

Last updated: 11 June 2018
Source: fr.soccerway.com

== Squad list ==
As of August 11, 2018. Note: Flags indicate national team as defined under FIFA eligibility rules; some limited exceptions apply. Players may hold more than one non-FIFA nationality.

No.	Pos.	Nation	Player
1	GK	ALG	Ali Bencherif
3	DF	ALG	Ilies Bouheniche
5	DF	ALG	Arslane Mazari
6	MF	ALG	Nassim Chadi
7	MF	ALG	Mehdi Kadri
9	MF	ALG	Khalil Semahi
11	FW	MLI	Malick Touré
12	FW	ALG	Abdelhakim Amokrane
14	FW	ALG	Mohamed Kamel Soltani
15	DF	ALG	Billel Bouldiab
16	GK	ALG	Athmane Toual
17	DF	ALG	Yanis Mouhli

No.	Pos.	Nation	Player
18	FW	ALG	Youcef Islam Herida
19	DF	ALG	Abdelhak Debbari
20	MF	ALG	Ahmed Kadous
21	MF	ALG	Billal Ouali
22	DF	ALG	Mohamed Naasse Laraba
23	MF	ALG	Marouane Dahar
25	FW	ALG	Amir Soltane
26	MF	ALG	Reda Bellahcene
27	MF	ALG	Sofiane Aibout
28	FW	ALG	Mohamed Nadjib Touati
29	FW	MLI	Moussa Camara

== Transfers ==
=== In ===
Date	Pos	Player	From club	Transfer fee	Source
8 June 2018	FW	(Algeria) Abdelhakim Amokrane	ES Sétif	Free transfer	
8 June 2018	MF	(Algeria) Sofiane Aibout	MC Saida	Free transfer	
9 June 2018	MF	(Algeria) Omar Boudoumi	MC Oran	Free transfer	
11 June 2018	MF	(Algeria) Merouane Dahar	CS Constantine	Free transfer	
11 June 2018	DF	(Algeria) Ilyes Bouheniche	USM Blida	Free transfer	
11 June 2018	FW	(Mali) Malick Touré	US Biskra	Free transfer	
14 June 2018	MF	(Algeria) Reda Bellahcene	USM Alger	Free transfer (Released)	
16 June 2018	DF	(Algeria) Arslane Mazari	USM El Harrach	Free transfer	
16 June 2018	DF	(Algeria) Abdelhak Debbari	USM El Harrach	Free transfer	
24 June 2018	FW	(Algeria) Kamel Soltani	ASO Chlef	Free transfer	
17 July 2018	FW	(Mali) Moussa Camara	(Egypt) Ismaily SC	Free transfer	
18 July 2018	GK	(Algeria) Athmane Toual	USM Bel Abbès	Free transfer	
28 July 2018	FW	(Algeria) Lounes Messaoudi	SRB Tazmalt	Free transfer	
4 December 2018	MF	(Algeria) Salim Boukhenchouche	JS Kabylie	Loan for six month	
29 December 2018	FW	(Benin) Jacques Bessan	(Tunisia) Stade Tunisien	Undisclosed	
2 January 2019	FW	(Algeria) Mohamed Bentiba	ASM Oran	Free transfer	
8 January 2019	MF	(Algeria) Bouazza Feham	MC Oran	Free transfer	
10 January 2019	DF	(Algeria) Abdelaziz Ali Guechi	(Tunisia) AS Gabès	Undisclosed	

=== Out ===
Date	Pos	Player	To club	Transfer fee	Source
8 June 2018	MF	(Algeria) Yacine Salhi	CS Constantine	Free transfer	
5 July 2018	MF	(Algeria) Oussama Aggar	DRB Tadjenanet	Free transfer	
