= Malick Touré =

Malian footballer (1995–2024)

Personal information
- Date of birth: 22 September 1995
- Place of birth: Bamako, Mali
- Date of death: 11 September 2024 (aged 28)
- Height: 1.79 m (5 ft 10 in)
- Position: Left winger

Youth career
- Djoliba AC

Senior career*
Years	Team	Apps	(Gls)
2011–2013	Djoliba AC	0	(0)
2013–2016	Club Africain	27	(1)
2016–2017	EO Sidi Bouzid	0	(0)
2017–2018	US Biskra	8	(1)
2018–2019	MO Béjaïa	27	(5)
2019–2021	ES Sétif	26	(5)
2021–2023	Ghazl El Mahalla SC	14+	(0+)

International career
2015	Mali U20	6	(0)
- * Club domestic league appearances and goals

Malick Touré (22 September 1995 – 11 September 2024) was a Malian professional footballer who played as a left winger.

== Club career ==
Malick Touré joined the Algerian Ligue 1 in the transfers winter 2017–18 with US Biskra, during which he played 8 matches and scored a single goal against DRB Tadjenanet. Then, with the team falling to Ligue 2 on 11 June 2018 Touré joined MO Béjaïa. The Malian said on this subject: "It is an honor for me to sign in a club as big as MO Béjaïa. I am therefore delighted to give the maximum to help the club achieve its objectives." On 11 August, he made his debut in the Ligue 1 against Olympique de Médéa as a starter and scored his first goal in 4–2 away victory. Touré finished the season with five goals from 28 games, just like last season MO Béjaïa fell to the second division so that he had to search for another club because the law prohibits foreign players from playing in the second division.

On 16 July, Malick Touré joined ES Sétif for three seasons. He made his debut for the team against USM Alger as a substitute. Later in the next round he played his first match as a starter against MC Oran in 1–1 draw. Then he waited until round 13 to score his first goal, where he scored a double against AS Aïn M'lila on 26 December, followed by another double, this time in the Algerian Cup against AB Chelghoum Laïd in 5–1 victory.

== International career ==
In 2015, Touré was part of the Mali under-20 national team at the 2015 FIFA U-20 World Cup in New Zealand where he participated in six matches. He started in the first match, a 2–0 victory against Mexico, but in the remaining matches he came on as a substitute, with Mali finishing in third place.

== Death ==
Touré died of a heart attack on 11 September 2024, at the age of 28.

== Career statistics ==
=== Club ===
Appearances and goals by club, season and competition
Club	Season	League			Cup		Continental		Other		Total	
Club	Season	Division	Apps	Goals	Apps	Goals	Apps	Goals	Apps	Goals	Apps	Goals
Club Africain	2013–14	Tunisian Ligue 1	7	0	0	0	—		—		7	0
Club Africain	2014–15	Tunisian Ligue 1	1	0	0	0	—		—		1	0
Club Africain	2015–16	Tunisian Ligue 1	19	1	0	0	0 (Note: Appearance(s) in CAF Champions League)	0	—		19	1
Club Africain	Total		27	1	0	0	0	0	0	0	27	1
US Biskra	2017–18	Algerian Ligue 1	8	1	0	0	—		—		8	1
MO Béjaïa	2018–19	Algerian Ligue 1	27	5	0	0	—		—		27	5
ES Sétif	2019–20	Algerian Ligue 1	18	3	1	0	—		—		19	3
ES Sétif	2020–21	Algerian Ligue 1	8	2	0	0	4	0	—		12	2
ES Sétif	Total		26	5	1	0	4	0	0	0	31	5
Ghazl El Mahalla SC	2021–22	Egyptian Premier League	14	0	0	0	—		—		14	0
Career total			102	12	1	0	4	0	0	0	107	12

== Honours ==
Club Africain

- Tunisian Ligue Professionnelle 1: 2014–15
