= Simukonda =

Simukonda is a surname. Notable people with the surname include:

- Ambwene Simukonda (born 1984), Malawian sprinter
- Andy Simukonda (born 1992), Malawian football player
- Fighton Simukonda (1958–2016), Zambian football player and coach
- Zachariah Simukonda (born 1983), Zambian football player
