= Pascal Karama =

Burkinabé footballer

Personal information
- Full name: Pascal Bakanhaye Karama
- Date of birth: May 11, 1993 (age 33)
- Place of birth: Bobo-Dioulasso, Burkina Faso
- Height: 1.83 m (6 ft 0 in)
- Position: Midfielder

Senior career*
Years	Team	Apps	(Gls)
2009–2015	RC Bobo Dioulasso		
2015–2016	Santa Maria Galegos	25	(5)
2016–2017	Juventude de Pedras Salgadas	7	(0)
2017–2018	Torcatense	23	(0)
2018–	GD Porto d'Ave		

International career
- Burkina Faso U17
2013	Burkina Faso	1	(0)
- * Club domestic league appearances and goals

Pascal Bakanhaye Karama (born May 11, 1993) is a Burkinabé international footballer. Karama made his debut for the Burkina Faso national team in 2013 in a friendly match against Nigeria.

He played in the 2009 African U-17 Championship, where they finished in third place.
