= Ilyas Cherchar =

Algerian football player (born 1992)

Personal information
- Full name: Mohammed Ilyas Cherchar
- Date of birth: 18 January 1992 (age 34)
- Place of birth: Chlef, Algeria
- Height: 1.85 m (6 ft 1 in)
- Position: Defender

Team information
- Current team: RC Arbaâ

Youth career
- 2005–2007: ASO Chlef
- 2007–2010: AC FAF
- 2010: SAS Épinal
- 2010–2013: Nancy

Senior career*
Years	Team	Apps	(Gls)
2013–2015	ASO Chlef	23	(0)
2015–2016	RC Arbaâ	22	(0)

International career^{‡}
2007–2009	Algeria U17	33	(2)
- * Club domestic league appearances and goals as of 00:00, 23 May 2020 (EST) ‡ National team caps and goals as of 00:00, 16 June 2015 (EST)

Mohammed Ilyas Cherchar (born 18 January 1992) is an Algerian football player who plays for RC Arbaâ in the Algerian Ligue Professionnelle 1.

== Club career ==
A product of the ASO Chlef youth ranks, Cherchar joined the AC FAF Academy in 2007 in preparation for the 2009 African U-17 Championship that Algeria was hosting. In January 2010, Cherchar joined French club SAS Épinal before signing for AS Nancy six months later. After spending three seasons with Nancy's reserve team, Cherchar returned to Algeria and signed a two-year contract with his boyhood club ASO Chlef.

== International career ==
Cherchar was a member of the Algeria national under-17 football team that finished as runners-up at the 2009 African U-17 Championship and subsequently played at the 2009 FIFA U-17 World Cup in Nigeria. Cherchar started all three of Algeria's games in the competition, captaining the squad in the opener against Italy.
