= 2022 Super League of Malawi =

Football season in Malawi

Super League of Malawi
- Season: 2022
- Dates: 19 March – 19 November
- Champions: Nyasa Big Bullets
- Relegated: Sable Farming; Thomas Nyirenda Stars; Rumphi United
- Top goalscorer: Babatunde Adepoju (18 goals)

The 2022 Super League of Malawi (known as the TNM Super League for sponsorship reasons) was the 36th season of the Super League of Malawi, the top professional league for association football clubs in Malawi since its establishment in 1986. The season started on 19 March 2022 and was ended on 19 November 2022. Nyasa Big Bullets are the defending champions.

Nyasa Big Bullets retained the Super League title following their 3–1 win over Moyale Barracks on 12 November 2022.

== Teams ==
Sixteen teams competed in the league – the top thirteen teams from the previous season and the three promoted teams from the regional leagues: Rumphi United, Dedza Dynamos and Sable Farming.

Other changes

- Mighty Wanderers were renamed as Mighty Mukuru Wanderers during the season.

=== Stadiums and locations ===
Locations of the 2020–21 Super League of Malawi teams

Team	Location	Stadium	Capacity
Nyasa Big Bullets	Blantyre	Kamuzu Stadium	65,000
Silver Strikers	Lilongwe	Silver Stadium	20,000
Mighty Wanderers	Blantyre	Kamuzu Stadium	65,000
Civil Service United	Lilongwe	Civo Stadium	25,000
Karonga United	Karonga	Karonga Stadium	20,000
Moyale Barracks	Mzuzu	Mzuzu Stadium	15,000
TN Stars	Kasungu	Kasungu Stadium	6,000
MAFCO	Nkhotakota	Chitowe Stadium	1,000
Ekwendeni Hammers	Mzuzu	Mzuzu Stadium	15,000
Kamuzu Barracks	Lilongwe	Civo Stadium	25,000
Red Lions	Balaka	Balaka Stadium	3,000
Blue Eagles	Lilongwe	Nankhaka Stadium	5,000
Mighty Tigers	Nchalo	Kalulu Stadium	3,000
Dedza Dynamos	Dedza	Dedza Stadium	6,000
Sable Farming	Blantyre	Mpira Stadium	6,244
Rumphi United	Rumphi	Rumphi Stadium	1,000

== League table ==
Pos	Team	Pld	W	D	L	GF	GA	GD	Pts	Qualification or relegation
1	Nyasa Big Bullets (C)	30	22	7	1	69	21	+48	73	Qualification for CAF Champions League
2	Blue Eagles	30	18	9	3	39	10	+29	63	
3	Kamuzu Barracks	30	16	9	5	37	19	+18	57	
4	Mighty Wanderers	30	16	8	6	53	26	+27	56	
5	Silver Strikers	30	14	9	7	38	26	+12	51	
6	MAFCO Salima	30	14	8	8	49	26	+23	50	
7	Moyale Barracks	30	14	4	12	38	32	+6	46	
8	Civil Service United	30	10	15	5	35	25	+10	45	
9	Dedza Dynamos	30	11	8	11	29	36	−7	41	
10	Ekwendeni Hammers	30	8	10	12	33	35	−2	34	
11	Karonga United	30	8	8	14	26	42	−16	32	
12	Mighty Tigers	30	8	7	15	23	38	−15	31	
13	Red Lions	30	7	8	15	27	38	−11	29	
14	Sable Farming (R)	30	6	6	18	24	44	−20	24	Relegation
15	Thomas Nyirenda Stars (R)	30	4	5	21	24	68	−44	17	Relegation
16	Rumphi United (R)	30	3	1	26	15	73	−58	10	Relegation

Source: Soccerway
Rules for classification: 1) points; 2) goal difference; 3) goals scored.
(C) Champions; (R) Relegated

== Top goalscorers ==
Rank	Player	Club	Goals
1	(Nigeria) Babatunde Adepoju	Nyasa Big Bullets	18
2	(Malawi) Muhammad Sulumba	Mighty Wanderers	15
3	(Malawi) Chawanangwa Kaonga	Silver Strikers	13
4	(Malawi) Raphael Phiri	Civil Service United	12
5	(Malawi) Mphatso Filimoni	MAFCO Salima	10
5	(Malawi) Zeliat Nkhoma	Kamuzu Barracks	10
