= Sainey Sambou =

Gambian footballer

Personal information
- Full name: Sainey Sambou
- Date of birth: February 2, 1992 (age 34)
- Place of birth: Gambia
- Position: Midfielder

Senior career*
Years	Team	Apps	(Gls)
2016–	Brikama United FC	-	(-)

International career
2016–2017	Gambia	5	(0)
- * Club domestic league appearances and goals

Sainey Sambou (born February 2, 1992) is a Gambian footballer who currently plays for Brikama United FC and the Gambia national football team. Sambou has five caps for Gambia.

He played in the 2009 African U-17 Championship, where they won first place.
