= Djelloul Djouba =

Algerian footballer (born 1992)

Personal information
- Full name: Djelloul Djouba
- Date of birth: April 2, 1992 (age 34)
- Place of birth: Algeria
- Position: Midfielder

Senior career*
Years	Team	Apps	(Gls)
2011–2013	ASO Chlef	2	(0)

International career
2009	Algeria U17	5	(0)
- * Club domestic league appearances and goals

Djelloul Djouba (born April 2, 1992) is an Algerian footballer who is currently unattached. Djouba was part of the Algeria national under-17 football team that finished as runner-ups at the 2009 African U-17 Championship and also played at the 2009 FIFA U-17 World Cup.
