= Luke Milanzi =

Malawian footballer

Luka Milanzi
Personal information
- Full name: Luke Bruno Milanzi
- Date of birth: 4 December 1994 (age 31)
- Place of birth: Blantyre, Malawi
- Height: 1.78 m (5 ft 10 in)
- Position: Striker

Senior career*
Years	Team	Apps	(Gls)
2007–2009	Eagle Strikers		
2009–2010	ESCOM United		
2010–2017	TP Mazembe		
2012	→ Don Bosco (loan)		
2012	→ NAPSA Stars (loan)		
2013	→ ZESCO United (loan)		
2014–2016	→ Mighty Wanderers (loan)		
2016	→ Big Bullets (loan)		
2017	Big Bullets		
2017	→ Masters Security (loan)		
2017–2018	Blue Eagles		

International career
2009	Malawi U17	7	(2)
2009–2010	Malawi	2	(0)

Managerial career
- Bright Stars
- 2022: Rumphi United
- Kadona Stars
- 2023: Karonga United
- 2023–2024: Karonga United (assistant)
- 2024–: Dedza Dynamos (assistant)
- * Club domestic league appearances and goals

Luke Bruno Milanzi (born 4 December 1994), variously known as Luka Milanzi or Bruno Milanzi, is a former Malawian footballer.

== Club career ==
Milanzi joined Congolese side TP Mazembe in 2010 from ESCOM United in suspicious circumstances, with FIFA having to intervene after Milanzi had signed a 3 1/2-year deal, despite international rules stating players under 18 could only sign 3-year deals. The two sides' documentation reportedly did not match either, with rumours of Milanzi lying about his age, a common occurrence in African football. Because of this, when he called up to the Malawi national team in 2010, Milanzi had to travel through Zambia before entering Malawi, and often has trouble journeying between countries due to his questionable documents.

In January 2012, TP Mazembe loaned Milanzi to its affiliate CS Don Bosco. Milanzi remained under contract with TP Mazembe. However, he did not break into the first team, and would be loaned to NAPSA Stars and ZESCO United. In 2014, Milanzi was cleared to play for the Mighty Wanderers of his hometown, Blantyre, after initially not being able to sign due to preconditions on his loan release. He impressed during his time with The Nomads, who then extended his loan deal in 2015.

He signed on loan for the Big Bullets in 2016 from TP Mazembe.

He joined Masters Security in April 2017 in a loan deal from Big Bullets. However, due to an issue with wage payment, he left in late 2017 to join Blue Eagles. He played for the Eagles for a few months before being released.

Shortly after his release from the Eagles, Milanzi retired prematurely from football, citing an injury sustained during his time with TP Mazembe.

== International career ==
Milanzi played for the Malawi under 17's at the 2009 African U-17 Championship, despite supposedly only being 14 at the time. He also played at the 2009 FIFA U-17 World Cup, where he made three appearances and scored a consolation goal in a 4–1 loss to Spain.

He made his one and only senior appearance in 2010, a second-half substitute in a friendly against Zimbabwe.

He was called up to the squad again in 2015 while playing for the Mighty Wanderers.

== Coaching career ==
In 2020, Milanzi went into coaching, attending a course to obtain a Local D license and coaching at local Mzuzu club Bright Stars. He later went on to coach Rumphi United in the Super League of Malawi.

After a stint with Kadona Stars, he managed Karonga United, but after the club were fined due to Milanzi's lack of a CAF B coaching license, he was replaced by Trevor Kajawa. Having remained with the club as part of the coaching staff, he left after a year in March 2024. Days after leaving Karonga United, he was named assistant manager of Dedza Dynamos.

== Career statistics ==
=== International ===
National team	Year	Apps	Goals
Malawi	2009	1	0
Malawi	2010	1	0
Total		2	0
