= Reda Hajhouj =

Moroccan footballer

Personal information
- Full name: Reda Hajhouj
- Date of birth: 2 July 1994 (age 32)
- Place of birth: Casablanca, Morocco
- Height: 1.75 m (5 ft 9 in)
- Position: Winger

Team information
- Current team: MA Tétouan

Senior career*
Years	Team	Apps	(Gls)
2014–2018	Wydad Casablanca	66	(25)
2017	→ Ajman Club (loan)	9	(7)
2018	USM Alger	8	(2)
2018–2020	Olympique Khouribga	45	(21)
2020–2022	FUS Rabat	40	(11)
2022–2023	Al-Faisaly	12	(2)
2023	Hajer	17	(2)
2023–2024	Naft Maysan		
2024	Hajer	10	(0)
2024–	MA Tétouan	0	(0)

International career
2012–2014	Morocco U20	9	(1)
2014–2017	Morocco U23	10	(3)
- * Club domestic league appearances and goals

Reda Hajhouj (born 2 July 1994) is a Moroccan professional footballer who plays as a winger for MA Tétouan.

== Club career ==
=== USM Alger ===
On 15 January 2018, the last day of the winter transfer window, El Hajhouj went on an 18-month contract with USM Alger to become the second Moroccan to play with him after Saïd Baâzouz in 2000–01 season. his first game was against DRB Tadjenanet and contributed to a 3–0 win over a decisive pass and then in the next round against USM Bel-Abbès, scored his first goal was not enough where they lost 1–2.

=== Al-Faisaly ===
On 23 August 2022, Hajhouj joined Saudi Arabian club Al-Faisaly. On 30 December 2022, Hajhouj was released from his contract.

=== Hajer ===
On 18 January 2023, Hajhouj joined Hajer.

=== Naft Maysan ===
On 15 August 2023, Hajhouj joined Naft Maysan.

=== Hajer return ===
On 16 January 2024, Hajhouj returned to Hajer on a six-month contract.

== Career statistics ==
=== Club ===
As of 25 January 2020

Appearances and goals by club, season and competition
Club	Season	League			Cup		Continental		Total	
Club	Season	Division	Apps	Goals	Apps	Goals	Apps	Goals	Apps	Goals
Wydad Casablanca	2013–14	Botola	3	0	0	0	—		3	0
Wydad Casablanca	2014–15	Botola	27	6	4	2	—		31	8
Wydad Casablanca	2015–16	Botola	23	9	3	2	13 (Note: Appearance(s) in CAF Champions League)	6	39	17
Wydad Casablanca	2016–17	Botola	6	0	3	1	—		9	1
Wydad Casablanca	2017–18	Botola	7	0	—		2 (Note: Appearance(s) in 2017 FIFA Club World Cup)	1	9	1
Wydad Casablanca	Total		66	15	10	5	15	7	91	27
Ajman Club (loan)	2016–17	UAE First Division	9	7	0	0	—		9	7
USM Alger	2017–18	Ligue 1	8	2	1	0	1 (Note: Appearance(s) in CAF Confederation Cup)	0	10	2
Olympique Khouribga	2018–19	Botola	21	11	0	0	—		21	11
Olympique Khouribga	2019–20	Botola	11	7	0	0	—		11	7
Olympique Khouribga	Total		32	18	0	0	—		32	18
Career total			119	42	11	5	16	7	146	52

== Honours ==
Wydad Casablanca

- Botola: 2014–15, 2016–17
- CAF Champions League: 2017

Ajman Club

- UAE Division One: 2017

Individual

- Botola Team of the Season: 2021–22
