= Peter Ndlovu =

Zimbabwean footballer and manager (born 1973)

Personal information
- Full name: Peter Ndlovu
- Date of birth: 25 February 1973 (age 53)
- Place of birth: Bulawayo, Zimbabwe
- Height: 1.73 m (5 ft 8 in)
- Positions: Striker; winger

Senior career*
Years	Team	Apps	(Gls)
1988–1990	Highlanders		(20)
1991–1997	Coventry City	176	(39)
1997–2001	Birmingham City	106	(23)
2000–2001	→ Huddersfield Town (loan)	6	(4)
2001–2004	Sheffield United	135	(25)
2004–2008	Mamelodi Sundowns	81	(20)
2008–2009	Thanda Royal Zulu		
2010	Highfield United		
2011	Black Mambas		
Total		504	(111)

International career
1990–2007	Zimbabwe	100	(37)

Managerial career
- 2011–2013: Zimbabwe (assistant manager)
- 2013–2015: Mamelodi Sundowns (team manager)
- 2026–: Scottland (team manager)
- * Club domestic league appearances and goals

Peter Ndlovu (born 25 February 1973) is a Zimbabwean football coach and former professional player who is the team manager at Zimbabwe Premier Soccer League side Scottland.

As a player he was as a striker from 1988 until 2011, notably spending time in England and more specifically in the Premier League with Coventry City as well as in the Football League for Birmingham City, Huddersfield Town, and Sheffield United. The rest of his career was spent in his native Africa with Highlanders, Mamelodi Sundowns, Thanda Royal Zulu, Highfield United and Black Mambas. He is the only Zimbabwean who was capped 100 times for his country, scoring 37 goals.

Since retirement, Ndlovu has moved into coaching and has worked as assistant manager of Zimbabwe, before returning to Mamelodi as the club's team manager.

== Early life ==
Ndlovu comes from Binga district in North Western, Siabuwa Zimbabwe. He was however born in Bulawayo. He attended Mzilikazi High School.

== Club career ==
=== Coventry City ===
Ndlovu was originally spotted by John Sillett, prior to his official signing from Highlanders by Terry Butcher in July 1991. He made an immediate impact by scoring away at Arsenal and then became the toast of Highfield Road with a thunderbolt winner against Aston Villa in November 1991, endearing him to the Sky Blues fans.

Although he would go on to play a major role at several clubs in the First Division, it is his time at Coventry that he is particularly known for, given the club's top-flight status at that time. He would play a significant role in two major teams, Bobby Gould's attacking team of 1992/93 and the expansive squad of the mid and late 1990s, during which time Ron Atkinson and then Gordon Strachan managed the club. Bobby Gould's team in 1992–93 are widely regarded as under-achievers, finishing 15th in the first Premier League season, having spent much of the season in considerably higher positions.

On 19 August 1992, Ndlovu made history by being the first African footballer to play in the new English Premier League. Having acquired striker Micky Quinn in November 1992 they continued what had already been a blistering start, with away wins at Tottenham Hotspur (2–0) Sheffield Wednesday (2–1) and Wimbledon (2–1) to add to already impressive home wins against Middlesbrough (2–1). By the early autumn the Sky Blues briefly topped the inaugural Premier League and would only lose five league games prior to Christmas. The addition of Micky Quinn to the squad led to further outstanding home wins against Aston Villa (3–0) and Liverpool (5–1). In February 1993, they won 4–2 against title chasing, big spending Blackburn Rovers. However, a barren final few weeks of the season and a run in that would see back to back games against Man United, Liverpool, Chelsea and Leeds United saw them slip from fifth in the league in February to 15th in the final table. The season finished with a thrilling performance from Ndlovu in a 3–3 draw against Leeds United. Ndlovu was a key component throughout the season in Gould's fast pacey front line which included John Williams, Kevin Gallacher (until his departure to Blackburn) and Robert Rosario, who formed a worthy partnership with Micky Quinn. Ndlovu's goal against Norwich City, in a 1–1 draw in late September, was a signature piece of Ndlovu flair which earned him the Match of the Day 'Goal of the month' competition.

The 1993–94 season would see a managerial shift in the autumn as Gould resigned and was succeeded by his assistant Phil Neal - but not before the legendary curtain raiser to the second Premier League season. Bobby Gould's first day gamble would be to play without traditional full backs. This novel formation gave Ndlovu full licence to play a large part in a memorable opening day triumph in the capital. The 3–0 victory at Highbury over Arsenal saw Micky Quinn score a hat-trick in front of the newly refurbished North Bank. It also ensured that the Sky Blues made one of their customary lightning starts to the season, so synonymous of this era. After an early Ian Wright threat on the Coventry goal, it was Ndlovu who made a darting run into the Arsenal penalty box which produced a clumsy challenge from Lee Dixon. The resulting penalty was calmly converted by Micky Quinn for the opener. The second half would see Ndlovu and Roy Wegerle lead the Gunners defence a merry dance, Wegerle in particular enjoying possibly his finest game for the club. So shocked were Arsenal by the 3–0 defeat that manager George Graham cancelled the proposed post-match lap of honour at the final whistle, which was to parade their League Cup and FA Cup silverware. The explanation given by Arsenal was 'Reasons beyond the club's control!'. It is reported that Coventry rejected a £4 million offer from Arsenal for Ndlovu during the 1993–94 season - a deal which would have made Ndlovu the most expensive player signed by an English club. The dramatic resignation of Bobby Gould, after a 5–1 mauling at Loftus Road in October 1993, was reputedly inspired by the possible imminent sale of Ndlovu to a top six club.

However, Ndlovu stayed but the 11th-place finish secured that season was not repeated in the 1994–95 campaign. Phil Neal was replaced by Ron Atkinson in February. Big Ron was credited with saving the club from relegation in the spring of 1995, and brought in Gordon Strachan as his assistant. This second significant phase for Ndlovu would once again promise much - the 'new era' of big money signings heralded by Atkinson's appointment saw the arrival of Huckerby, Whelan, Salako and McAllister together with Neal's £2 million signing Dion Dublin. Big Ron provided vital impetus early on, but the following season his stylish and classy team sheet rarely 'clicked' in the traditional sense. However, Ndlovu still scored some memorable goals for the Sky Blues during this period, including the first away player to secure a hat-trick at Anfield for 30 years. Other memorable goals in Sky Blue included a vital winning goal away at Wimbledon in a relegation six-pointer and a dynamic last minute rifling winner in a 3rd Round FA Cup tie at West Bromwich Albion.

Ndlovu gradually suffered due to inconsistency. The large and expansive side Gordon Strachan inherited, well equipped with attacking options, saw fierce competition for places from Whelan, Huckerby, Salako and Telfer. An increasingly cosmopolitan Premier league too would eventually see Coventry turn to Steve Froggatt and Moroccan internationals Mustapha Hadji and Youssef Chippo in the years following Ndlovu's departure. He was known as 'Nuddy' by Coventry City fans and his other nicknames being 'The Bulawayo Bullet' and 'Nsukuzonke' an isiNdebele word referring to his ability to turn on the style everytime/day he played.

=== Birmingham City ===
Ndlovu eventually moved to Birmingham City in July 1997, signed by Trevor Francis for a fee of £1.6 million. Ndlovu is generally considered a success by Blues fans, despite failing to reach the Premiership whilst "Nuddy" was in their ranks. Ndlovu's old-school wing play helped propel the Blues to two successive play-off appearances in Nationwide Division One, though both appearances would ultimately end in semi-final defeats. He spent time on loan at Huddersfield Town in December 2000, where he scored twice on his debut against Wolverhampton Wanderers. Upon returning to Birmingham he helped them beat Ipswich Town in the semi-final of the 2000-01 League Cup. However, before the final he was released to join Sheffield United in February 2001.

=== Sheffield United ===
Ndlovu also enjoyed success at Sheffield United and was known to their fans as 'Nuddy'. With him playing on the right side of midfield, United managed to get to two semi-finals of major cup competitions, in addition to the final of the First Division play-offs in the 2002–03 season.

He scored the winning goal against Leeds United in the 2002 Worthington Cup competition and scored a hat-trick against Cardiff City in 2003–04. He left the Blades in the summer of 2004 having scored 25 goals in 135 league games. In all, Ndlovu scored more than 90 goals during his 12 seasons and 338 appearances in the top two flights of the English football league.

=== In South Africa ===
Ndlovu signed for South African Premier Soccer League outfit Mamelodi Sundowns during the 2004 off-season. Thanda Royal Zulu made one of their major signings before transfer window closed on the day by bringing former Mamelodi Sundowns striker Ndlovu on board. Ndlovu was released from his contract by Thanda Royal Zulu at the end of 2008–09 after they were relegated from South Africa's top division. He stayed for two years without playing football.

== Coaching career ==
In 2011, Ndlovu became the assistant manager of the Zimbabwe national team.

In 2013, Ndlovu returned to Mamelodi Sundowns as the club's team manager.

Ndlovu was appointed Scottland team manager in January 2026.

== Personal life ==
Peter's brothers, Adam and Madinda, were also international players. The brothers played on the streets of Makokoba, Zimbabwe, where they grew up. Peter also played in both his primary (Lotshe Primary) and secondary (Mzilikazi) schools and his hometown team Highlanders before joining Coventry in 1991.

His surname is commonly mispronounced by British commentators and, as a result, fans as well. Throughout his career, he was referred to as 'Und-luv', when in fact, the pronunciation of his surname is closer to 'Nd-lo-vu'.

Ndlovu was left in a "critical" condition in hospital after a car crash near the Victoria Falls Airport in Zimbabwe on 16 December 2012. Ndlovu's BMW X5 had suffered a tyre blow out which caused it to come off the road and hit a tree. He suffered internal injuries, head injuries, broken ribs and a broken leg and his brother Adam and a female passenger were killed. Ndlovu subsequently faced trial the following March for culpable homicide, with the prosecution claiming he was responsible for failing to control his car properly. He was acquitted in April 2013, with the court citing a lack of evidence to prove Ndlovu's responsibility.

In 2023, Ndlovu was involved in a legal dispute over child maintenance, during which he stated that he had 13 children.

== Career statistics ==
=== International ===
Scores and results list Zimbabwe's goal tally first, score column indicates score after each Ndlovu goal.

List of international goals scored by Peter Ndlovu
No.	Date	Venue	Opponent	Score	Result	Competition
1	25 August 1990	Botswana National Stadium, Gaborone, Botswana	Zambia	1–3	1–3	1990 SADCC Tournament
2	26 August 1990	Botswana National Stadium, Gaborone, Botswana	Botswana	7–0	7–0	1990 SADCC Tournament
3	16 August 1992	Rufaro Stadium, Harare, Zimbabwe	South Africa	3–1	4–1	1994 Africa Cup of Nations qualification
4	16 August 1992	Rufaro Stadium, Harare, Zimbabwe	South Africa	4–1	4–1	1994 Africa Cup of Nations qualification
5	20 December 1992	National Sports Stadium, Harare, Zimbabwe	Egypt	1–0	2–1	1994 FIFA World Cup qualification
6	31 January 1993	National Sports Stadium, Harare, Zimbabwe	Angola	2–1	2–1	1994 FIFA World Cup qualification
7	13 November 1994	National Sports Stadium, Harare, Zimbabwe	Zaire	2–1	2–1	1996 Africa Cup of Nations qualification
8	23 April 1995	National Sports Stadium, Harare, Zimbabwe	Malawi	1–0	1–1	1996 Africa Cup of Nations qualification
9	19 April 1998	National Sports Stadium, Harare, Zimbabwe	Namibia	4–1	5–2	1998 COSAFA Cup
10	24 May 1998	Estádio da Machava, Maputo, Mozambique	Mozambique	1–0	2–0	1998 COSAFA Cup
11	31 July 1999	National Sports Stadium, Harare, Zimbabwe	Senegal	1–0	2–1	2000 Africa Cup of Nations qualification
12	9 April 2000	Barthélemy Boganda Stadium, Bangui, Central African Republic	Central African Republic	1–0	1–0	2002 FIFA World Cup qualification
13	23 April 2000	National Sports Stadium, Harare, Zimbabwe	Central African Republic	2–0	3–1	2002 FIFA World Cup qualification
14	15 July 2000	Barbourfields Stadium, Bulawayo, Zimbabwe	Seychelles	5–0	5–0	2002 Africa Cup of Nations qualification
15	3 September 2000	National Sports Stadium, Harare, Zimbabwe	DR Congo	2–0	3–2	2002 Africa Cup of Nations qualification
16	24 February 2001	Stade Municipal, Bobo-Dioulasso, Burkina Faso	Burkina Faso	1–0	2–1	2002 FIFA World Cup qualification
17	24 February 2001	Stade Municipal, Bobo-Dioulasso, Burkina Faso	Burkina Faso	2–0	2–1	2002 FIFA World Cup qualification
18	24 March 2001	Setsoto Stadium, Maseru, Lesotho	Lesotho	1–0	1–0	2002 Africa Cup of Nations qualification
19	5 May 2001	FNB Stadium, Johannesburg, South Africa	South Africa	1–2	1–2	2002 FIFA World Cup qualification
20	12 October 2002	Cicero Stadium, Asmara, Eritrea	Eritrea	1–0	1–0	2004 Africa Cup of Nations qualification
21	30 March 2003	National Sports Stadium, Harare, Zimbabwe	Seychelles	1–0	3–1	2004 Africa Cup of Nations qualification
22	30 March 2003	National Sports Stadium, Harare, Zimbabwe	Seychelles	3–1	3–1	2004 Africa Cup of Nations qualification
23	5 July 2003	National Sports Stadium, Harare, Zimbabwe	Eritrea	1–0	2–0	2004 Africa Cup of Nations qualification
24	5 July 2003	National Sports Stadium, Harare, Zimbabwe	Eritrea	2–0	2–0	2004 Africa Cup of Nations qualification
25	31 August 2003	Barbourfields Stadium, Bulawayo, Zimbabwe	Swaziland	1–0	2–0	2003 COSAFA Cup
26	31 August 2003	Barbourfields Stadium, Bulawayo, Zimbabwe	Swaziland	2–0	2–0	2003 COSAFA Cup
27	5 October 2003	National Sports Stadium, Harare, Zimbabwe	Malawi	2–0	2–0	2003 COSAFA Cup
28	12 October 2003	National Sports Stadium, Harare, Zimbabwe	Mauritania	3–0	3–0	2006 FIFA World Cup qualification
29	25 January 2004	Stade Taïeb Mhiri, Sfax, Tunisia	Egypt	1–0	1–2	2004 Africa Cup of Nations
30	29 January 2004	Stade Taïeb Mhiri, Sfax, Tunisia	Cameroon	1–0	3–5	2004 Africa Cup of Nations
31	29 January 2004	Stade Taïeb Mhiri, Sfax, Tunisia	Cameroon	2–3	3–5	2004 Africa Cup of Nations
32	27 June 2004	Somhlolo National Stadium, Lobamba, Swaziland	Swaziland	2–0	5–0	2004 COSAFA Cup
33	27 June 2004	Somhlolo National Stadium, Lobamba, Swaziland	Swaziland	4–0	5–0	2004 COSAFA Cup
34	27 June 2004	Somhlolo National Stadium, Lobamba, Swaziland	Swaziland	5–0	5–0	2004 COSAFA Cup
35	3 July 2004	Amahoro Stadium, Kigali, Rwanda	Rwanda	1–0	2–0	2006 FIFA World Cup qualification
36	5 June 2005	National Sports Stadium, Harare, Zimbabwe	Gabon	1–0	1–0	2006 FIFA World Cup qualification
37	19 June 2005	Ahmed Zabana Stadium, Oran, Algeria	Algeria	2–2	2–2	2006 FIFA World Cup qualification

== Bibliography ==
- Brown, Jim (2000). Coventry City: The Elite Era. Desert Island Books. ISBN 978-1-874287-36-0.
