= Kombi Mandjang =

Cameroonian footballer

Personal information
- Full name: Alexandre Dore Kombi Mandjang Mougui
- Date of birth: 1 June 1992 (age 34)
- Place of birth: Douala, Cameroon
- Height: 1.74 m (5 ft 9 in)
- Positions: Midfielder; left-back

Team information
- Current team: FC Ganshoren
- Number: 23

Senior career*
Years	Team	Apps	(Gls)
- Les Astres
2012–2016	Union Douala		
2016–2017	Domžale	1	(0)
2017–	FC Ganshoren	85	(4)

International career
2015–2016	Cameroon	10	(0)
- * Club domestic league appearances and goals as of 21 January 2026

Alexandre Dore Kombi Mandjang Mougui (born 1 June 1992) is a Cameroonian professional footballer who plays as a midfielder and left back for FC Ganshoren.

== Club career ==
Mandjang joined Union Douala in 2012, after starting his career at Les Astres FC. He appeared with the former in 2013 CAF Champions League, as his side were knocked out by FUS de Rabat. In September 2016 he was signed by Slovenian club NK Domžale.

== International career ==
Mandjang was called up to Cameroon national team on 10 November 2014, as a replacement to Moussa Bana. He made his international debut on the 25th, coming on as a second-half substitute for Benjamin Moukandjo in a 1–0 friendly win against Indonesia.

== Career statistics ==
=== International ===
As of 18 September 2016

Cameroon
Year	Apps	Goals
2015	7	0
2016	5	0
Total	12	0
