= Abdou Njie =

Gambian footballer

Personal information
- Date of birth: 26 September 1992 (age 34)
- Place of birth: Banjul
- Height: 1.78 m (5 ft 10 in)
- Position: Defender

Senior career*
Years	Team	Apps	(Gls)
2007–2017	Gambia Ports Authority FC		

International career
- Gambia U17
- Gambia U20
2010–2015	Gambia	4	(0)
- * Club domestic league appearances and goals

Abdou Njie (born 26 September 1992) is a Gambian footballer who played as a defender for Gambia Ports Authority FC.
