= Rumphi United =

Malawian football club

- Full name: Rumphi United Football Club
- Nickname: Leopards of Chikulamayembe
- Founded: 2019
- Stadium: Rumphi Stadium
- Capacity: 1,000
- Owner: Jones Mocktone Mkandawire
- Chairman: Wyn Katenga Kaunda
- Manager: Elias Chirambo
- League: Northern Region Football League
- 2022: TNM Super League, 16th of 16 (relegated)
- Website: https://m.facebook.com/pg/Rumphi-United-FC-104149408493557/about/

Rumphi United Football Club is a Malawian football club based in Rumphi, Northern region of Malawi. They play their home matches at the Rumphi Stadium, which is the road on which the ground is located. The club is currently a member of the TNM Super League.

== History ==
The club was founded in 2019 by Jones Mocktone Mkandawire. The club was promoted to the TNM Super League at the end of the 2020–21 season after beating Embangweni United 3–0 in Northern Region Football Association to enter the top flight of Malawian football. The club also reached the 2021 FDH Bank Knockout Cup semifinals. However, they lost to Ekwendeni Hammers on penalties.

In the 2021–22 season, the club have only won three games. Including a 3–0 win against Mighty Tigers. The club's ground is the Rumphi Stadium where it is a capacity of one thousand (1,000).

== Honours ==
Northern Region Football League

- Winners (1): 2020–21

== Current squad 2021–22 ==
As of June 2022

Note: Flags indicate national team as defined under FIFA eligibility rules; some limited exceptions apply. Players may hold more than one non-FIFA nationality.

No.	Pos.	Nation	Player
20	GK	MWI	Antony Singini
42	GK	MWI	Innocent Nyasulu
32	DF	MWI	Chimwemwe Kaliyala
22	DF	MWI	Nathan Msiska
19	DF	MWI	Suzgo Mwakasinga
21	DF	MWI	Brian Mhone
10	MF	MWI	Festus Chikwezga
6	MF	MWI	Takondwa Mphaza
13	MF	MWI	Tiza Nyirenda
5	MF	MWI	Uchizi Gondwe
12	MF	MWI	Jacob Tembo
14	MF	MWI	Phillimon Ndhlovu
17	MF	MWI	Gerald Ngwira
8	MF	MWI	Ganizani Muomba
9	FW	MWI	Trouble Kajani
80	FW	MWI	Omega Mhone
29	FW	MWI	Christian Muomba
7	FW	MWI	Zikani Kasambala
15	MF	MWI	Waliko Chaula
11	FW	MWI	Wellington Mkandawire
