= Mzilikazi High School =

Coordinates: 20.1305°S 28.5762°E

Mzilikazi High School Northern Ndebele: eMgandane
- Bulawayo; Zimbabwe

Information
- School type: Secondary school

Mzilikazi High School (also known locally, in Ndebele, as eMgandane), is a government-maintained F1 (i.e. academic) secondary school named in recognition of the Ndebele king Mzilikazi, the founder of the Ndebele Nation. The School is in the city of Bulawayo, Zimbabwe, located along the Old Falls Road, a road that used to link Bulawayo with the Victoria Falls. It is located very close to the famous Mpilo Hospital of Bulawayo. Mzilikazi High School is physically located between Greenspan Suburb (and Cemetery) and Mzilikazi Township.

In the history of the Ndebele Kingdom, Mzilikazi High School draws most of its students from local feeder primary schools named after other Ndebele Royal figures, such as Mzilikazi himself; his son, Lobhengula; Lobhengula's Queen, Lozikeyi; and other leaders, such as Lotshe. Thus, notable primary schools whose ex-pupils proceed onto Mzilikazi High School for secondary school education include: Mzilikazi Primary School, Lobhengula Primary School, Lotshe Primary School, and Lozikeyi Primary School. Others include St. Patrick's Primary School and St. Columbus Primary School.

== Notable alumni ==
Some of Zimbabwe's top footballers were groomed here, like Peter Ndlovu (who has played for Coventry City F.C., Birmingham City F.C., and Huddersfield Town F.C.), the late Benjamin Konjera, and the late Adam Ndlovu.Mzilikazi is also recognized for sports in 2018 Mzilikazi won the NASH Athletics under coach Mthembisi Mpofu

Yvonne Vera, the late internationally recognised novelist, and Prof Welshman Ncube, law professor and prominent opposition politician, are also alumni. NoViolet Bulawayo, the famous novelist, also attended the school.
