= List of Algerian football transfers winter 2017–18 =

This is a list of Algerian football transfers in the 2017–18 winter transfer window by club. clubs in the 2017–18 Algerian Ligue Professionnelle 1 are included.

== Ligue Professionnelle 1 ==
=== CR Belouizdad ===
In:

No.	Pos.	Nation	Player
—	MF	ALG	Mohamed Benkablia (From (Algeria) USM Alger)
—	MF	ALG	Faouzi Bourenane (From (Algeria) USM Alger)
—	MF	MLI	Soumaila Sidibe (Loan from (Algeria) USM Alger)

Out:

No.	Pos.	Nation	Player
9	FW	ALG	Mohamed Amine Hamia (To (Algeria) USM Alger)

=== CS Constantine ===
In:

No.	Pos.	Nation	Player
—	MF	ALG	Ahmed Gagaâ (Loan from (Algeria) Paradou AC)

Out:

No.	Pos.	Nation	Player

=== DRB Tadjenanet ===
In:

No.	Pos.	Nation	Player
—	FW	ALG	Abdellah Djelloul Daouadji (Loan from (Algeria) Paradou AC)

Out:

No.	Pos.	Nation	Player

=== ES Sétif ===
In:

No.	Pos.	Nation	Player
—	FW	ALG	Sid Ahmed Aouedj (From (Algeria) MC Alger)

Out:

No.	Pos.	Nation	Player
9	FW	ALG	Youcef Chibane (Loan to (Algeria) MC Oran)

=== JS Kabylie ===
In:

No.	Pos.	Nation	Player
—	MF	ALG	Lyes Benyoucef (Loan from (Algeria) Paradou AC)
—	MF	ALG	Ziri Hammar (Loan from (Algeria) USM Alger)

Out:

No.	Pos.	Nation	Player
—	FW	ALG	Nasreddine Benabbou (To (Algeria) MC Saïda)

=== JS Saoura ===
In:

No.	Pos.	Nation	Player
—	GK	ALG	Mohamed Seddik Mokrani (from (Algeria) USM El Harrach)
—	FW	LBY	Mohamed Al Ghanodi (from (Libya) Al Ahli Tripoli)

Out:

No.	Pos.	Nation	Player

=== MC Alger ===
In:

No.	Pos.	Nation	Player
—	FW	ALG	Mohamed Souibaâh (from (Algeria) MC Oran)
—	FW	ALG	Oussama Tebbi (from (Algeria) RC Relizane)
—	MF	MLI	Aliou Dieng (From (Mali) Djoliba AC)

Out:

No.	Pos.	Nation	Player
2	FW	NGA	Barnabas Imenger Jr. (to)
10	FW	ALG	Sid Ahmed Aouedj (To (Algeria) ES Sétif)
18	FW	ALG	Mohamed Seguer (to (Algeria) USM Bel-Abbès)
20	FW	ALG	Zakaria Mansouri (to (Algeria) Paradou AC)

=== MC Oran ===
In:

No.	Pos.	Nation	Player
—	FW	ALG	Youcef Chibane (Loan from (Algeria) ES Sétif)
—	FW	ALG	Zakaria Mansouri (From (Algeria) Paradou AC)

Out:

No.	Pos.	Nation	Player
9	FW	ALG	Mohamed Souibaâh (to (Algeria) MC Alger)

=== Paradou AC ===
In:

No.	Pos.	Nation	Player
—	FW	ALG	Zakaria Mansouri (From (Algeria) MC Alger)

Out:

No.	Pos.	Nation	Player
10	MF	ALG	Lyes Benyoucef (Loan to (Algeria) JS Kabylie)
29	MF	ALG	Ahmed Gagaâ (Loan to (Algeria) CS Constantine)
27	FW	ALG	Abdellah Djelloul Daouadji (Loan to (Algeria) DRB Tadjenanet)
—	FW	ALG	Zakaria Mansouri (to (Algeria) MC Oran)

=== NA Hussein Dey ===
In:

No.	Pos.	Nation	Player

Out:

No.	Pos.	Nation	Player
9	FW	ALG	Mohamed Boulaouidet (to (Saudi Arabia) Ohod Club)
22	MF	ALG	Billel Ouali (to ?)
26	MF	ALG	Oualid Ardji (Loan Return (Algeria) USM Alger)

=== Olympique de Médéa ===
In:

No.	Pos.	Nation	Player

Out:

No.	Pos.	Nation	Player
10	FW	ALG	Sofiane Younes (To (Algeria) USM El Harrach)

=== USM Alger ===
In:

No.	Pos.	Nation	Player
—	MF	ALG	Oualid Ardji (Loan Return from (Algeria) NA Hussein Dey)
—	MF	ALG	Rafik Bouderbal (Return to complete his contract)
—	FW	ALG	Mohamed Amine Hamia (From (Algeria) CR Belouizdad)
—	FW	MAR	Reda Hajhouj (From (Morocco) Wydad Casablanca)

Out:

No.	Pos.	Nation	Player
21	DF	ALG	Nacereddine Khoualed (to (Saudi Arabia) Ohod Club)
10	MF	ALG	Ziri Hammar (Loan to (Algeria) JS Kabylie)
17	MF	ALG	Mohamed Benkablia (To (Algeria) CR Belouizdad)
14	MF	ALG	Faouzi Bourenane (To (Algeria) CR Belouizdad)
4	MF	MLI	Soumaila Sidibe (Loan to (Algeria) CR Belouizdad)

=== USM Blida ===
In:

No.	Pos.	Nation	Player

Out:

No.	Pos.	Nation	Player

=== US Biskra ===
In:

No.	Pos.	Nation	Player

Out:

No.	Pos.	Nation	Player
22	MF	MTN	Boubacar Bagili (to ?)
9	FW	MTN	Abdellah Sy (to ?)
20	MF	ALG	Yahia Labani (From (Algeria) USM Bel-Abbès)

=== USM Bel-Abbès ===
In:

No.	Pos.	Nation	Player
—	FW	ALG	Mohamed Seguer (From (Algeria) MC Alger)
—	MF	ALG	Yahia Labani (From (Algeria) US Biskra)
—	MF	ALG	Billel Mebarki (From (Algeria) USM El Harrach)
—	DF	ALG	Nour El Islam Salah (Unattached)

Out:

No.	Pos.	Nation	Player

=== USM El Harrach ===
In:

No.	Pos.	Nation	Player
—	FW	ALG	Sofiane Younes (From (Algeria) Olympique de Médéa)

Out:

No.	Pos.	Nation	Player
16	GK	ALG	Mohamed Seddik Mokrani (to (Algeria) JS Saoura)
21	MF	ALG	Billel Mebarki (To (Algeria) USM Bel-Abbès)
