= Moussa Alzouma =

Nigerien footballer

Personal information
- Full name: Moussa Alzouma
- Date of birth: 30 September 1982 (age 44)
- Place of birth: Niger
- Position: Goalkeeper

Team information
- Current team: AS GNN

Senior career*
Years	Team	Apps	(Gls)
- Sahel SC
- AS GNN

International career^{‡}
2012–	Niger	1	(0)
- * Club domestic league appearances and goals as of 25 January 2013 ‡ National team caps and goals as of 25 January 2013

Moussa Alzouma is a Nigerien footballer who plays as a goalkeeper.
