= Boubacar Talatou =

Nigerien footballer

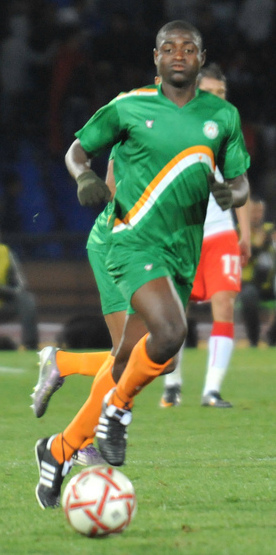

Personal information
- Full name: Boubacar Djibo Talatou
- Date of birth: December 3, 1987 (age 38)
- Place of birth: Niamey, Niger
- Height: 1.74 m (5 ft 9 in)
- Position: Midfielder

Team information
- Current team: Djoliba AC

Senior career*
Years	Team	Apps	(Gls)
2007–2010	AS GNN		
2010–2011	AS Mangasport		
2011–2012	Orlando Pirates	1	(0)
2012–2013	Thanda Royal Zulu	6	(0)
2013	AS GNN		
2014–2015	ASN Nigelec		
2016	Recreativo da Caála	6	(0)
2017–2019	AS FAN		
2019–	Djoliba AC		

International career^{‡}
2010–	Niger	23	(0)
- * Club domestic league appearances and goals ‡ National team caps and goals as of 03-12-2013

Boubacar Talatou (born December 3, 1987, in Niamey) is a Nigerien footballer. He plays as a midfielder for Djoliba AC in Mali.

== Career ==
Diego previously played for AS FNIS, Gabon's AS Mangasport and South African team Orlando Pirates.

== International career ==
He is a member of the Niger national football team, having been called up to the 2012 Africa Cup of Nations and 2013 Africa Cup of Nations.
