= Jacques Bessan =

Beninese football player

Personal information
- Full name: Abrahame Jacques Bessan
- Date of birth: 15 September 1993 (age 33)
- Place of birth: Abomey, Benin
- Height: 1.89 m (6 ft 2 in)
- Position: Forward

Senior career*
| Years | Team | Apps | (Gls) |
| 2008–2012 | Soleil FC | | |
| 2012–2015 | ES Zarzis | 32 | (6) |
| 2015–2016 | CA Bizertin | 13 | (2) |
| 2016 | EGS Gafsa | 13 | (12) |
| 2016–2018 | Club Africain | 6 | (1) |
| 2017 | → Al Ahli Tripoli (loan) | 1 | (0) |
| 2017–2018 | Stade Tunisien | 24 | (11) |
| 2019 | MO Béjaïa | 12 | (2) |
| 2019–2020 | TP Mazembe | | |

International career^{‡}
| 2013 | Benin U20 | 2 | (0) |
| 2010–2019 | Benin | 9 | (1) |
- * Club domestic league appearances and goals as of 04:10, 22 August 2019 (UTC) ‡ National team caps and goals as of 08:07, 13 March 2026 (UTC)

Abrahame Jacques Bessan (born September 15, 1993) is a Beninese professional footballer who plays as a forward.

== Playing career ==
=== Club career ===
Bessan debuted for Soleil FC of the Benin Premier League as a teenager in 2008 and showed promise early on.

In August 2012, he signed a five-year contract with Tunisian second division club ES Zarzis, after several weeks on trial with the team. He helped them promote to the Tunisian Ligue Professionnelle 1 by scoring 12 goals in the 2013–14 season. The next year (his first season in a fully professional league), he scored six goals in 30 matches and was chosen to play in a friendly match between the Tunisian Olympic Team and a team of the best foreign players playing in the Tunisian league.

At the end of the year, it was reported that he had signed a five-year deal with Egyptian Premier League club El Ittihad Alexandria. However, the following month, it was revealed "the deal fell through". He eventually signed a three-year deal with CA Bizertin, another Tunisian team, hours before the transfer window deadline (September 17). After making only 13 appearances for Bizertin (and scoring twice), he made another move. Bessan signed yet another three-year contract with EGS Gafsa in January 2016.

Bessan made an immediate impact for Gafsa. In his debut with his new team, a February 14 matchup with Zarzis, he scored in the third minute of an eventual 1–1 tie. The following week, in a match against Stade Gabèsien, he scored once again with a "stratospheric" bicycle kick in the 54th minute that contributed to a 2–0 win, and earned him man of the match honors. This was the start of a goal-scoring rampage by Bessan. On March 6, Gafsa found themselves down two goals against AS Marsa. Bessan assisted Slim Bacha in the 41st minute, and then scored a goal of his own just before halftime to salvage a point. The following week, he salvaged yet another point by scoring a 66' equalizer in an eventual 2–2 tie with ES Métlaoui. With his fourth goal in five matches, the "Gafsa savior" was beginning to be noticed. On May 1, he scored the game winner in the 83rd minute to defeat AS Kasserine 2–1. In a May 29 matchup against JS Kairouan, with his team down 1–0, Bessan scored in the 82nd minute, and then again in stoppage time for the victory, pushing them to 13th place and out of the relegation zone.

He finished the season tied as the league's second-leading goal-scorer, and propelled his team from 16th (last place) to 14th in the second half of the season. For his heroic performance, he was called "the best African player in the second half of the [2015–16] season."

== International career ==
In early 2013, Bessan was selected to represent the Benin U20 team at the 2013 African U-20 Championship. Ahead of the tournament, he participated in three test matches in Marseille, against the Nice, Olympique de Marseille, and Arles-Avignon U19 squads. At the actual tournament in Algeria, Bessan made appearances against Algeria and Ghana, respectively. They were eliminated in group play.

As for the senior national team, he made his debut during the 2012 African Cup of Nations qualification, coming on as a late second-half sub for Razak Omotoyossi during a 3–0 victory over Rwanda on October 9, 2010. He was later called up by head coach Omar Tchomogo for a double-header against South Sudan during the 2017 Africa Cup of Nations qualification, but did not come off the bench in either match. He earned his second international cap during the CAF second round of the 2018 FIFA World Cup qualification, coming on as a substitute for Jordan Adeoti during a 2–0 loss to Burkina Faso.

== Career statistics ==
=== International ===
As of match played 30 June 2018

Appearances and goals by national team and year
| National team | Year | Apps | Goals |
|---|---|---|---|
Benin
| Benin | 2010 | 1 | 0 |
| Benin | 2011 | 1 | 0 |
| Benin | 2012 | 0 | 0 |
| Benin | 2013 | 0 | 0 |
| Benin | 2014 | 0 | 0 |
| Benin | 2015 | 3 | 1 |
| Benin | 2016 | 1 | 0 |
| Benin | 2017 | 3 | 0 |
| Benin | 2018 | 0 | 0 |
| Total | | 9 | 1 |

=== International goals ===
Scores and results list Benin's goal tally first.

| No | Date | Venue | Opponent | Score | Result | Competition |
|---|---|---|---|---|---|---|
| 1. | 13 October 2015 | Nicaragua National Football Stadium, Brazzaville, Republic of the Congo | Congo | 1–1 | 1–2 | Friendly |
