= Lamin Samateh =

Gambian footballer (born 1992)

Personal information
- Date of birth: 26 June 1992 (age 34)
- Place of birth: Kiang Keneba, Gambia
- Height: 1.85 m (6 ft 1 in)
- Position: Centre-back

Senior career*
Years	Team	Apps	(Gls)
2009–2010	Steve Biko		
2011–2014	Lokomotiva Zagreb	42	(1)
2014	KuPS	2	(0)
2015–2017	ViOn Zlaté Moravce	3	(0)
2017–2018	Olympique Médenine	1	(0)
2018–2020	Muaither		
2020–2021	Al-Nojoom	5	(0)
2021–2022	Naft Maysan		
2022–2023	Jeddah	16	(0)
2023–2024	Newroz		
2025–2026	One Taguig		

International career
2009	Gambia U17	4	(0)
2011–	Gambia	6	(0)
- * Club domestic league appearances and goals

Lamin Basmen Samateh (born 26 June 1992) is a Gambian professional footballer who plays as a centre-back.

Lamin Samateh plays usually as central defender, although he can also play as right-back. While playing in his home country, he was known by the nickname of Gunman.

He came to Zagreb in January 2011 during the 2010–11 Prva HNL winter break, signed from Gambian Championnat National D1 club Steve Biko FC, which ended up relegated. For the rest of the season, he made 7 league appearances scoring one goal, with Lokomotiva in the 2010–11 season.

During 2009 he was part of the Gambian U-17 squad which played in the 2009 FIFA U-17 World Cup. During 2010 he was part of Gambian U-20 team. In early 2011 he was part of the Gambian squad at the 2011 African Youth Championship.

On September 3, 2011, he made his debut for the Gambian national team in a match against Namibia for the 2012 Africa Cup of Nations qualification.

On 13 August 2022, Samateh joined Saudi Arabian club Jeddah.

== External sources ==
- Lamin Samateh at Soccerway (archived)
- Lamin Samateh – FIFA competition record (archived)
