= Abdelhak Benaniba =

French footballer (born 1995)

Personal information
- Date of birth: 10 June 1995 (age 31)
- Place of birth: Créteil, France
- Height: 1.82 m (6 ft 0 in)
- Position: Midfielder

Team information
- Current team: Chatou

Youth career
- 2001–2015: Créteil

Senior career*
Years	Team	Apps	(Gls)
2015–2017	Créteil	7	(0)
2016–2017	Créteil B	25	(0)
2017–2018	Biskra	23	(0)
2018–2020	Ivry	39	(0)
2020–2021	Versailles	9	(0)
2021–2023	Sainte-Geneviève	48	(1)
2023–2024	St Maur Lusitanos	23	(0)
2024	MSP Batna		
2024–	Chatou	2	(0)
- * Club domestic league appearances and goals as of 3 November 2024

Abdelhak Benaniba (born 10 June 1995) is a French footballer who plays as a midfielder for Championnat National 3 club Chatou.
