= Aboubacar Camara (footballer, born 1993) =

Guinean footballer

Bouba
Personal information
- Full name: Aboubacar Camara
- Date of birth: 1 June 1993 (age 33)
- Place of birth: Conakry, Guinea
- Height: 1.82 m (6 ft 0 in)
- Position: Goalkeeper

Youth career
- 2011–2012: Alcoyano

Senior career*
Years	Team	Apps	(Gls)
2012–2013	Alcoyano B	21	(0)
2013–2014	Alcoyano	11	(0)
2014–2016	UCAM Murcia	8	(0)
2016–2017	Torrevieja	26	(0)
2017–2018	Huétor Tájar	19	(0)
2018–2019	Los Garres	29	(0)
2019–2021	Minerva	19	(0)
2021–2022	Los Garres	50	(0)
2022–2024	Plus Ultra	15	(0)

International career^{‡}
2012–	Guinea	1	(0)
- * Club domestic league appearances and goals as of 27 January 2024 ‡ National team caps and goals as of 22 October 2013

Aboubacar Camara (born 1 June 1993), most known as Bouba or Buba, is a Guinean footballer who plays as a goalkeeper.

== Club career ==
Born in Conakry, Bouba moved to Spain in 2011, and signed with CD Alcoyano. He made his senior debuts with the reserves in 2012–13 season, in the fifth division.

Bouba was promoted for the Valencians' first team in 2013 summer, being the only goalkeeper in all three divisions who kept a clean sheet in the first five games of the season.

On 18 June 2014, Bouba rescinded his link with Alcoyano, and joined fellow league team UCAM Murcia CF shortly after.

== International career ==
After appearing in 2012 Africa Cup of Nations as a third-choice goalkeeper, Bouba made his Guinea debut on 6 February 2013, playing the entire second half in a 1–1 draw against Senegal.
