= Abdoulaye Ousmane =

Footballer (born 2000)

Personal information
- Full name: Abdoulaye Ousmane
- Date of birth: 22 February 2000 (age 26)
- Place of birth: Maubeuge, France
- Height: 1.83 m (6 ft 0 in)
- Position: Centre-back

Team information
- Current team: Strasbourg B

Youth career
- US Maubeuge
- Valenciennes

Senior career*
Years	Team	Apps	(Gls)
2019–2020	Valenciennes B	13	(0)
2020–2021	Strasbourg B	4	(0)
2021	Strasbourg	0	(0)
2022	Apollon Larissa	0	(0)
2022–2024	Lille B	45	(1)
2024–2025	Granville	5	(0)
2025–	Strasbourg B	20	(0)

International career
2021	Mauritania	1	(0)
- * Club domestic league appearances and goals as of 20:28, 20 February 2026 (UTC)

Abdoulaye Ousmane (Arabic: عبد الله عثمان; born 22 February 2000) is a professional footballer who plays as a centre-back for Championnat National 3 side Strasbourg B. Born in France, he played for the Mauritania national team.

== Club career ==
Born in Maubeuge, Ousmane began playing football at local club US Maubeuge. He later joined Valenciennes before signing for Strasbourg. On 10 February 2021, he made his professional debut in a 2–0 Coupe de France loss to Montpellier on 10 February 2021. He was released at the end of the 2020–21 season.

In early February 2022, Ousmane joined Greek club Apollon Larissa on a contract until June 2023. However, he left the club in July 2022. Ousmane then joined French side Lille's reserve team on 22 September 2022.

== International career ==
Born in France, Ousmane is of Mauritanian descent. He made his debut for Mauritania national team on 26 March 2021 in an AFCON qualifier against Morocco.
