= 2009 African U-17 Championship =

بطولة أفريقيا تحت 17 سنة لكرة القدم 2009

Tournament details
- Host country: Algeria
- City: Algiers
- Dates: 19 March – 2 April
- Teams: 8 (from CAF confederations)
- Venue: 2 (in 1 host city)

Final positions
- Champions: Gambia
- Runners-up: Algeria
- Third place: Burkina Faso
- Fourth place: Malawi

Tournament statistics
- Matches played: 13
- Goals scored: 33 (2.54 per match)

The 2009 African U-17 Championship was a football competition organized by the Confederation of African Football (CAF). The tournament took place in Algeria. The top four teams qualified for the 2009 FIFA U-17 World Cup. Nigeria, automatically qualified as the hosts, didn't qualify for the Finals, although if they qualified for the Finals and went on to reach the semi-finals, then the teams who finished third in their respective groups would have met in a playoff for the fourth and final place in the 2009 FIFA U-17 World Cup.

== Qualification ==
=== Qualified teams ===
- Algeria (host nation)
- Burkina Faso
- Cameroon
- Gambia
- Guinea
- Malawi
- Niger
- Zimbabwe

== Venues ==
Zéralda, Algiers	2009 African U-17 Championship is located in Algeria	Dar El Beïda, Algiers
Zéralda Stadium	2009 African U-17 Championship is located in Algeria	Omar Benrabah Stadium
Capacity: 8,000	2009 African U-17 Championship is located in Algeria	Capacity: 5,000

== Group stage ==
=== Group A ===
Pos	Team	Pld	W	D	L	GF	GA	GD	Pts	Qualification
1	Gambia	3	3	0	0	5	0	+5	9	Knockout stage
2	Algeria (H)	3	2	0	1	2	2	0	6	Knockout stage
3	Guinea	3	0	1	2	0	2	−2	1	
4	Cameroon	3	0	1	2	0	3	−3	1	

Source: CAF
Rules for classification: Group stage tiebreakers
(H) Hosts
19 March 2009
14:00

Gambia	1 – 0	Guinea
Bojang 52'	Report

Stade Zéralda, Algiers
Referee: Martins De Carvalho (Angola)
19 March 2009
16:30

Algeria	1 – 0	Cameroon
Bendahmane 20'	Report

Stade Zéralda, Algiers
Referee: Joseph Lamptey (Ghana)

22 March 2009
14:00

Cameroon	0 – 2	Gambia
	Report	Dawda 20'; Alsana 75'

Stade Zéralda, Algiers
Referee: Abdellah El Achiri (Morocco)
22 March 2009
16:30

Guinea	0 – 1	Algeria
	Report	Bendahmane 15'

Stade Zéralda, Algiers
Referee: Fredrick Kayindi-Ngobi (Uganda)

25 March 2009
15:00

Algeria	0 – 2	Gambia
		Nyang 28'; Bojang 90'

Stade Zéralda, Algiers
Referee: Ousmane Karembe (Mali)
25 March 2009
15:00

Cameroon	0 – 0	Guinea

Omar Benrabah Stadium, Algiers
Referee: Slim Jedidi (Tunisia)

=== Group B ===
After the group ended, Niger was ejected from the competition for fielding an over-aged player, and CAF ordered that Niger's results be deleted from the records.

Original group standings

Pos	Team	Pld	W	D	L	GF	GA	GD	Pts
1	Burkina Faso	3	3	0	0	8	0	+8	9
2	Niger	3	2	0	1	3	2	+1	6
3	Malawi	3	1	0	2	6	4	+2	3
4	Zimbabwe	3	0	0	3	0	11	−11	0

Source: CAF
Rules for classification: Group stage tiebreakers

Adjusted standings

Pos	Team	Pld	W	D	L	GF	GA	GD	Pts	Qualification
1	Burkina Faso	2	2	0	0	7	0	+7	6	Knockout stage
2	Malawi	2	1	0	1	5	2	+3	3	Knockout stage
3	Zimbabwe	2	0	0	2	0	10	−10	0	

Source: CAF
Rules for classification: Group stage tiebreakers
20 March 2009
14:00

Burkina Faso	5 – 0	Zimbabwe
Ouiya 6', 33', 60'; Konseiga 28'; Kabre Wendkouni 81'	Report

Omar Benrabah Stadium, Algiers
Referee: Ali Lemghaifry (Mauritania)
20 March 2009
16:30

Niger	2 – 1	Malawi
Ousmane 4'; Sidibe 80'	Report	Milanzi 65'

Omar Benrabah Stadium, Algiers

23 March 2009
14:00

Zimbabwe	0 – 1	Niger
	Report	Ousmane 47'

Omar Benrabah Stadium, Algiers
Referee: Ousmane Karembe (Mali)
23 March 2009
16:30

Malawi	0 – 2	Burkina Faso
	Report	Zoungrana 55', 85'

Omar Benrabah Stadium, Algiers
Referee: Ali Lemghaifry (Mauritania)

26 March 2009
15:00

Burkina Faso	1 – 0	Niger
Adama 87'

Stade Zéralda, Algiers
Referee: Abdellah El Achiri (Morocco)
26 March 2009
15:15

Zimbabwe	0 – 5	Malawi
		Simukonda 53'; Milanzi 80'; Ngalande 82', 90'; Phiri 86'

Omar Benrabah Stadium, Algiers
Referee: Abdesslam Khelifi (Algeria)

== Knock-out stage ==
=== Semifinals ===
29 March 2009
13:30

Gambia	4 – 0	Malawi
Nyang 2'; Camara 18'; Bojang 53'; Gassama 79'

Stade Zéralda, Algiers
Referee: Joseph Lamptey (Ghana)
29 March 2009
15:45

Burkina Faso	0 – 1	Algeria
		Bendahmane 40'

Omar Benrabah Stadium, Algiers
Referee: Martins De Carvalho (Angola)

=== Third place match ===
1 April 2009
15:00

Malawi	2 – 3	Burkina Faso
Milanzi 38', 55'		Ouiya 46'; Alassane 69', 78'

Stade Zéralda, Algiers
Referee: Slim Jedidi (Tunisia)

=== Final ===
2 April 2009
15:30

Gambia	3 – 1	Algeria
Bojang 7', 85'; Camara 22'		Bendahmane 41'

Omar Benrabah Stadium, Algiers
Referee: Osmane Karembe (Mali)

== Winners ==
2009 CAF Under-17 Championship
(The Gambia)
Gambia
Second title
