= FC Inter Lion Ngoma =

FC International Lion Ngoma d'Ebolowa
- Full name: FC International Lion Ngoma d'Ebolowa
- Founded: 1975
- Ground: Stade d'Ebolwa; Mbouda, Cameroon
- Capacity: 12,000
Home colours

FC International Lion Ngoma d'Ebolowa is a soccer club in the Cameroons. It returned to the Cameroon Première Division in style since their relegation in 2003, finishing eighth with 47 points.
