= Nadir Bendahmane =

Algerian football player (born 1992)

Personal information
- Full name: Nadir Bendahmane
- Date of birth: 9 June 1992 (age 34)
- Place of birth: Miramas, France
- Height: 1.82 m (6 ft 0 in)
- Position: Forward

Youth career
- –2008: Istres
- 2008–2009: Cannes
- 2009–2011: Grenoble

Senior career*
Years	Team	Apps	(Gls)
2009–2011	Grenoble B		
2011–2012	Clermont	1	(0)
2011–2012	Tours B		
2011–2012	US Marignane		

International career^{‡}
2009	Algeria U17	7	(5)
- * Club domestic league appearances and goals as of 09:26, 7 August 2018 (UTC) ‡ National team caps and goals as of 00:00, 11 November 2011 (UTC)

Nadir Bendahmane (born 9 June 1992) is an Algerian former professional footballer who played as a forward. An Algerian under-17 international, he represented Algeria at the 2009 African U-17 Championship where he finished as the second top scorer with four goals.

== Club career ==
Bendahmane began his playing career in a local club in the town of Miramas. He then went on to play for the academies of Istres, Cannes and Grenoble.

On 30 June 2011, Bendahmane left relegated Grenoble and signed a one-year contract with Clermont. On 28 October 2011, he made his professional debut for Clermont as a 91st-minute substitute in a league match against Troyes.

== International career ==
In 2009, Bendahmane was selected as part of Algeria's under-17 national team for the 2009 African Under-17 Championship He scored four goals in the competition, was second top scorer behind Gambia's Ebrima Bojang, and helped Algeria finish second and qualify for the 2009 FIFA U-17 World Cup in Nigeria. However, he was not selected in the final squad for the U-17 World Cup after repeatedly failing to show up for training camps prior to the tournament.
