= Andy Simukonda =

Malawian footballer

Personal information
- Date of birth: 18 June 1992 (age 34)
- Position: Midfielder

Senior career*
Years	Team	Apps	(Gls)
2008–2016	Moyale Barracks		

International career^{‡}
2009	Malawi	1	(0)
- * Club domestic league appearances and goals as of 7 August 2021 ‡ National team caps and goals as of 7 August 2021

Andy Simukonda (born 18 June 1992) is a retired Malawian football midfielder.
