= Rashid (name) =

- Pronunciation: [raːʃɪd] (راشد) [raʃiːd] (رشيد)
- Gender: Male

Origin
- Origin: Arabic
- Meaning: "rightly guided"

Other names
- Alternative spelling: Rāshid: Raashid, Rachid, Rashed; Rashīd: Rachid, Rasheed; Rasyid (Malay/Indonesian); Reşit (Turkish); Rəşid (Azeri); Рәшит, Räşit, Räshid (Tatar / Bashkort)
- Derived: ر ش د (r š d)
- Related names: Rashida, Arshad

Rashid, Rashed, Rasheed, Rashied, or Rasyid is the transliteration of two masculine given names and surnames of Arabic origin: Arabic: راشد Rāshid and Arabic: رشيد Rashīd, both meaning 'rightly guided', 'having the true faith', or alternatively 'the high one'. In Islamic tradition, al-Rashid is one of the 99 names of Allah, and thus as a personal name is often used with the word abd (عبد الرشيد, ʻAbd al-Rashīd; "servant of the rightly guided"). Notable people with the name include:

== Given name ==
=== Rashed ===
- Rashed Ahmed (born 1986), Emirati footballer
- Rashed Ali (born 1989), Emirati footballer
- Rashed Mamun Apu (born 1979), Bangladeshi actor and director
- Rashed Chowdhury, Bangladeshi military official
- Rashed Al-Dwesan (born 1990), Saudi footballer
- Rashed Eisa (born 1990), Emirati footballer
- Rashed Hassan (born 1991), Emirati footballer
- Rashed Al-Hooti (born 1989), Bahraini footballer
- Rashedul Islam (born 1992), Bangladeshi footballer and sports journalist
- Rashedul Islam (politician) (born 1990), Bangladeshi politician, businessperson, and writer
- Rashed Khan (born 1994), Bangladeshi politician and activist
- Rashed Al-Khuzai (1850–1957), Jordanian politician
- Rashed Al-Majed (born 1969), Saudi singer, actor, musician, and record producer
- Rashed Khan Menon (born 1943), Bangladeshi politician
- Rashed Mohammed (born 1995), Emirati footballer
- Rashed Mosharraf (1941–2011), Bangladeshi politician
- Rashed Al-Mugren (born 1977), Saudi footballer
- Rashed Muhayer (born 1988), Emirati footballer
- Rashed Nawaf (born 2005), Qatari padel and tennis player
- Rashed Rababah, Jordanian journalist and television news presenter
- Rashed Al-Raheeb (born 1984), Saudi footballer
- Rashed Rahman, Pakistani journalist
- Rashed Rouf (born 1964), Bangladeshi novelist, editor, and journalist
- Rashed Al Mahmud Titumir, Bangladeshi politician and academic
- Rashed Al-Tumi (born 2000), Maltese footballer
- Rashed Zaman, Bangladeshi cinematographer and cameraman

=== Rasheed ===
- Rasheed Akanbi (born 1999), Nigerian footballer
- Rasheed Alabi (born 1986), Nigerian footballer
- Rasheed Amjad (1940–2021), Indian writer, critic, and scholar
- Rasheed Araeen (born 1935), Pakistani-British conceptual artist, sculptor, painter, writer, and curator
- Rasheed Atre (1919–1967), Pakistani film score composer
- Rasheed Bailey (born 1993), American football player
- Rasheed Bello (born 2003), American basketball player
- Rasheed Bertrand (born 1982), Dominican footballer
- Rasheed Bhatti (born 1952), Pakistani first-class cricketer
- Rasheed Broadbell (born 2000), Jamaican hurdler
- Rasheed Brokenborough (born 1977), American basketball player
- Rasheed Butt (born 1944), Pakistani calligrapher
- Rasheed al Deasy (born 1981), Moroccan footballer
- Rasheed Dwyer (born 1989), Jamaican athlete
- Rasheed El-Enany (born 1949), Egyptian literary scholar
- Rasheed Foster (born 2002), Jamaican sprinter
- Rasheed Hazzard (born 1976), American basketball coach
- Rasheed Ijaodola (died 2025), Nigerian legal practitioner
- Rasheed Seidu Inusa, Ghanaian diplomat and politician
- Rasheed Kidwai (born 1967), Indian journalist, author, and political analyst
- Rasheed Lawal (born 1983), Nigerian boxer
- Rasheed Mohammed Al Maraj (born 1955), Bahraini economist and banker
- Rasheed Marshall (born 1981), American football player
- Rasheed Masood (1947–2020), Indian politician
- Rasheed Miller (born 2000), Costa Rican long jumper
- Rasheed Naz (1948–2022), Pakistani actor
- Rasheed Newson (born 1979), American television drama writer, producer, and novelist
- Rasheed Olabiyi (born 1990), Nigerian footballer
- Rasheed Adisa Raji, Nigerian military administrator
- Rasheed Adebola Shabi, Nigerian chemical engineer, environmentalist, and politician
- Rasheed Shekoni, Nigerian Army officer
- Rasheed Ahmad Siddiqui (1892–1977), Indian writer and academic
- Rasheed Sulaimon (born 1994), Nigerian-American basketball player
- Rasheed Turabi (1908–1973), Indian Islamic scholar
- Rasheed Walker (born 2000), American football player
- Rasheed Wallace (born 1974), American basketball coach and player
- Rasheed Yusuff (born 1994), Qatari handball player

=== Rashid ===
- Rashid (rapper) (born 1988), Brazilian rapper
- Rashid Abdallah (born 1959), Tanzanian politician
- Rashid Abdillahi (1926–1969), Somali sultan
- Rashid Abdulrahman (born 1975), Emirati footballer
- Rashid Adewumi Aderinoye (born 1950), Nigerian academic
- Rashid bey Afandiyev (1863–1942), Azerbaijani educator, writer, ethnographer, playwright, and translator
- Rashid Ahad (born 1990), Malaysian cricketer
- Rashid Ahmed (1918–2005), Pakistan Navy officer
- Rashid Ahmed (footballer) (1916–1995), Bangladeshi footballer
- Rashid-bek Akhriev (1893–1942), Soviet aviator
- Rashid bey Akhundzadeh (1880–1940), Azerbaijani politician
- Rashid Alhassan (born 1998), Ghanaian footballer
- Rashid Ali (cricketer) (born 1975), Danish cricketer
- Rashid Ali (singer), Indian singer, musician, and composer
- Rashid bin Fadhel Al Bin Ali (1877–1960), Bahraini author, sailor, and poet
- Rashid Alimov (born 1953), Tajik diplomat and politician
- Rashid Anwar (1910–1983), Indian freestyle sport wrestler
- Rashid Asanov (born 1970), Russian footballer
- Rashid Askari (born 1965), Bangladeshi writer, columnist, media personality, and academic
- Rashid Assaf (born 1958), Syrian actor
- Rashid Hamad Al-Athba (born 1980), Qatari shooter
- Rashid Saleh Al-Athba (born 1987), Qatari sport shooter
- Rashid Atkins (born 1975), American basketball player
- Rashid Aya (born 1990), Malaysian footballer
- Rashid Bel Aziz (born 1967), Moroccan wrestler
- Rashid Bakr (musician) (born 1943), American free jazz drummer
- Rashid Bakr (politician) (1933–1988), Sudanese politician
- Rashid Barba'a (born 1952), Yemeni politician
- Rashid Bashir (born 1967), Pakistani-American academic
- Rashid Bawa (1940–2024), Ghanaian politician and diplomat
- Rashid Beebeejaun (born 1934), Mauritian politician
- Rashid Behbudov (1915–1989), Azerbaijani singer
- Rashid Bezimba (born 1966), Kenyan politician
- Rashid Bousarsar (born 1959), Tunisian volleyball player
- Rashid Browne (born 1993), Dutch footballer
- Rashid Buttar (1966–2023), American conspiracy theorist, anti-vaxxer, and osteopathic physician
- Rashid Byramji (1934–2022), Indian horse trainer
- Rashid Choudhury (1932–1986), Bangladeshi artist, sculptor, writer, and professor
- Rashid Ahmed Choudhury, Indian lawyer and politician
- Rashid Chunna (died 1985), Pakistani footballer
- Rashid Al-Daif (born 1945), Lebanese poet and novelist
- Rashid Al Dhaheri (born 2008), Emirati racing driver
- Rashid Diab (born 1957), Sudanese painter and art historian
- Rashid Din (born 1946), Malaysian politician
- Rashid Domingo (1937–2018), South African scientist
- Rashid Al-Dosari (born 1980), Bahraini footballer
- Rashid Shafi Al-Dosari (born 1981), Qatari track and field athlete
- Rashid Ahmad bin Fahad (born 1964), Emirati politician
- Rashid Farivar (born 1982), Iranian-Swedish engineer and politician
- Rashid Farooqui (born 1969), Pakistani actor
- Rashid Juma Al-Farsi (born 1993), Omani footballer
- Rashid Mohamed Mbaraka Fatma, Comorian doctor and politician
- Rashid Fayznejad (born 1950), Iranian singer, composer, and violinist
- Rashid Gallakberov (born 1966), Russian footballer
- Rashid Ahmad Gangohi (1826–1905), Indian Islamic scholar
- Rashid Khan Gaplanov (1883–1937), Azerbaijani statesman
- Rashid Gatrad (born 1946), Malawian consultant paediatrician
- Rashid Ali al-Gaylani (1892–1965), Iraqi politician
- Rashid Gayle (born 1974), American football player
- Rashid Gaysanov (born 1972), Russian politician
- Rashid Chidi Gumbo (born 1988), Tanzanian footballer
- Rashid Haider (1941–2020), Bangladeshi author and novelist
- Räshid Hakimsan (1934–1997), Finnish Tatar hockey player
- Rashid Léon Harerimana (born 1994), Burundian footballer
- Rashid Hassan, Sudanese academic
- Rashid Hussain (born 1946), Malaysian academic and entrepreneur
- Rashid Hussein (1936–1977), Palestinian poet, orator, journalist, and translator
- Rashid al-Haj Ibrahim (1889–1953), Palestinian Arab banker
- Rashid Ismayilov (1877–1942), Azerbaijani historian, publicist, and educator
- Rashid Israr (born 1953), Indian-Pakistani cricketer
- Rashid Jaber (born 1964), Omani football manager
- Rashid Jahan (1905–1952), Indian writer and medical doctor
- Rashid Al-Jirbi (born 1961), Emirati sprinter
- Rashid Johnson (born 1977), American artist
- Rashid Kadyrkaev, Uzbeki pair skater
- Rashid Kadyrov (born 1952), Uzbek politician
- Rashid Khan Kaplanov (1883–1937), Azerbaijani statesman
- Rashid Karami (1921–1987), Lebanese statesman
- Rashid Karim (1925–2011), Bangladeshi novelist
- Rashid Taan Kazim, Iraqi politician
- Rashid Khadr (born 1928), Egyptian middle-distance runner
- Rashid ul Khairi (1868–1936), Indian social reformer
- Rashid Khalidi (born 1948), Palestinian-American historian
- Rashid bin Abdullah Al Khalifa (born 1954), Bahraini royal
- Rashid bin Khalifa Al Khalifa (born 1952), Bahraini visual artist and royal
- Rashid Khan (born 1998), Afghan cricketer
- Rashid Khan (actor) (1915–1972), Indian actor
- Rashid Khan (cricketer) (born 1998), Afghan cricketer
- Rashid Khan (footballer) (1907–1967), Pakistani footballer
- Rashid Khan (golfer) (born 1991), Indian golfer
- Rashid Khan (musician) (1968–2024), Indian musician
- Rashid Khan (Nepalese cricketer) (born 2001), Nepalese cricketer
- Rashid Khan (Pakistani cricketer) (born 1959), Pakistani cricketer
- Rashid Ahmad Khan (born 1985), Pakistani singer, poet, and musicologist
- Rashid Aziz Khan (1941–2014), Pakistani jurist
- Rashid Abu Khawla, Syrian rebel leader
- Rashid al-Khoja (1884–1962), Iraqi politician
- Rashid Khutaba (born 1951), Russian freestyle wrestler
- Rashid Kurbanov (born 1987), Uzbek-Russian freestyle wrestler
- Rashid Latif (born 1968), Pakistani cricket player
- Rashid Al Leem (born 1966), Emirati businessman
- Rashid Lombard (1951–2025), South African jazz photographer and political photojournalist
- Rashid Lucman (1924–1984), Filipino legislator, journalist, and guerilla hero
- Rashid Ahmed Ludhianvi (1922–2002), Pakistani Islamic scholar and faqīh
- Rashid Magomedov (born 1984), Russian mixed martial artist
- Rashid Mahazi (born 1992), Australian footballer
- Rashid Mahdi (1923–2008), Sudanese photographer
- Rashid Mahmood (born 1971), Pakistani cricketer
- Rashid al-Dawla Mahmud (died 1075), Mirdasid emir of Aleppo
- Rashid Maidin (1917–2006), Malaysian politician
- Rashid bin Maktoum, Emirati royal
- Rashid bin Mohammed Al Maktoum (1981–2015), Emirati prince
- Rashid bin Saeed Al Maktoum (1912–1990), Emirati royal and politician
- Rashid Malallah (born 1987), Emirati footballer
- Rashid Mammadbeyov (1927–1970), Azerbaijani freestyle wrestler
- Rashid Mammadaliyev (born 2000), Azerbaijani judoka
- Rashid Mandawa (born 1996), Tanzanian footballer
- Rashid Al-Mannai (born 1988), Qatari track and field athlete
- Rashid Mansoor (born 1979), Pakistani first-class cricketer
- Rashid Al Marikhi, Bahraini Sufi sheikh
- Rashid Sheban Marzouk (born 1967), Qatari sprinter
- Rashid Masharawi (born 1962), Palestinian film director
- Rashid Massumi (1926–2015), Iranian-American cardiologist
- Rashid Matumla (born 1968), Tanzanian boxer
- Rashid Meer (1950–2021), Indian ghazal poet, critic, editor, and researcher
- Rashid Mehmood (born 1987), Pakistani field hockey player
- Rashid Minhas (1951–1971), Pakistani fighter pilot
- Rashid Mohamed (born 1979), Bahraini runner
- Rashid Mokhrani (born 1960), Algerian handball player
- Rashid Morai (1944–2014), Pakistani activist, poet, and teacher
- Rashid bin Ahmad Al Mualla (1876–1922), Emirati royal
- Rashid bin Ahmad Al Mualla II (1932–2009), Emirati royal
- Rashid bin Majid Al Mualla, Emirati royal
- Rashid Mubarak (born 1999), Emirati footballer
- Rashid Mubiru, Ugandan netball coach
- Rashid Muradymov (born 1977), Russian footballer
- Rashid Muslih (born 1970), Iraqi politician and spy
- Rashid Naseer (born 1986), Pakistani cricketer
- Räshid Nasretdin (1920–2010), Finnish Tatar photographer
- Rashid Akbar Khan Nawani, Pakistani politician
- Rashid Nazki (1931–2016), Kashmiri poet, teacher, author, and critic
- Rashid Nezhmetdinov (1912–1974), Soviet chess player
- Rashid-un-Nisa (1855–1929), Indian novelist, social reformer, and author
- Rashid Nortey (born 1995), Ghanaian footballer
- Rashid Abdullah Al Nuaimi, Emirati politician
- Rashid bin Humaid Al Nuaimi (died 1838), Emirati royal
- Rashid bin Humaid Al Nuaimi II (died 1891), Emirati royal
- Rashid bin Humaid Al Nuaimi III (1902–1981), Emirati royal and politician
- Rashid Nugmanov (born 1954), Kazakh film director, dissident, and political activist
- Rashid Nuhu (born 1995), Ghanaian footballer
- Rashid Nurgaliyev (born 1956), Russian military officer
- Rashid Omar (born 1961), Tanzanian politician
- Rashid Al-Owjan (born 1968), Qatari taekwondo athlete
- Rashid Patel (born 1964), Indian cricketer
- Rashid bin Matar Al Qasimi, Emirati royal
- Rashid Qureshi, Pakistani Army general
- Rashid al-Rajih (1944–2026), Saudi politician
- Rashid Rakhimov (born 1965), Tajik football manager and player
- Rashid Ramzi (born 1980), Moroccan athlete
- Rashid Rana (born 1978), Pakistani visual artist
- Rashid Fahd Al-Rasheed (born 1965), Saudi fencer
- Rashid Rashid, American dermatologist
- Rashid Abdalla Rashid (born 1973), Tanzanian politician
- Rashid Rauf (1981–2008), British-Pakistani alleged terrorist
- Rashid Rehman (1958–2014), Pakistani lawyer
- Rashid Riaz (born 1976), Pakistani cricket umpire and player
- Rashid Rida (1865–1935), Egyptian Islamic scholar, reformer, theologian, and revivalist
- Rashid al-Rifai (1929–2009), Iraqi academic, politician, and diplomat
- Rashid Sabir (1945–2012), Pakistani teacher and actor
- Rashid Sarwar (born 1965), Scottish footballer
- Rashid Sazmand (born 1951), Iranian business executive
- Rashid Seidu (born 1995), Ghanaian footballer
- Rashid Shabazz, American bodybuilder
- Rashid Shaheed (born 1998), American football player
- Rashid Al Shamrani (born 1960), Saudi television actor, clinical psychologist, and dramatist
- Rashid Sharafetdinov (1943–2012), Russian long-distance runner
- Rashid Sharifi (born 1984), Iranian weightlifter
- Rashid Shaz (born 1963), Indian Islamic scholar
- Rashid Shoucair, Lebanese scout
- Rashid Sidek (born 1968), Malaysian badminton player and coach
- Rashid Mahmood Soomro, Pakistani politician
- Rashid Seif Suleiman (born 1954), Tanzanian politician
- Rashid Sumaila (born 1992), Ghanaian footballer
- Rashid Sunyaev (born 1943), Russian astrophysicist
- Rashid Shami Suwaid (born 1973), Qatari footballer
- Rashid Sweissat (2002–2021), Jordanian boxer
- Rashid al-Shakir Sahib al-Taba'a (1790–1837), Tunisian politician
- Rashid Taha (1958–2018), French-Algerian rock-rai musician and activist
- Rashid Ahmed Khan Tahirkheli (died 2014), Pakistani academic
- Rashid Talaa (1877–1926), Jordanian politician
- Rashid Talukder (1939–2011), Bangladeshi photojournalist
- Rashid Temrezov (born 1976), Russian politician
- Rashid Tetteh (born 1995), Ghanaian footballer
- Rashid Mustafa Thirakwa (born 1964), Indian tabla player
- Rashid bey Topchubashov (1901–1927), Azerbaijani politician
- Rashid Tufail, Pakistani politician
- Rashid Tusupbekov (born 1955), Kazakh politician
- Rashid Vally, South African music producer and record shop owner
- Rashid Vatandoust (born 1946), Iranian opera singer
- Rashid Yasemi (1895–1951), Iranian poet
- Rashid Yassin (1931–2012), Iraqi journalist, poet, literary critic, and university professor
- Rashid Armand Young, American politician
- Rashid Yunusmetov (born 1979), Kazakh sport shooter
- Rashid Yussuff (born 1989), English footballer
- Rashid Zadran, Afghan cricketer
- Rashid Zia (born 1974), Pakistani cricketer

=== Rashied ===
- Rashied Ali (1933–2009), American free jazz and avant-garde drummer
- Rashied Davis (born 1979), American football player
- Rashied Doekhi (born 1955), Surinamese politician
- Rashied Staggie (1961–2019), South African gangster

=== Rasyid ===
- Rasyid Bakri (born 1991), Indonesian footballer

== Surname ==
=== Rashed ===
- Mohamed Al Rashed (born 1994), Sudanese footballer
- Mohammad Rashed (born 1987), Kuwaiti footballer

=== Rasheed ===
- Abdullah Rasheed (born 1952), Maldivian scout
- India Rasheed (born 2006), Australian rules footballer
- Kameelah Janan Rasheed (born 1985), American writer
- Kamran Rasheed (born 1949), Pakistani cricketer
- Roger Rasheed (born 1969), Australian tennis coach and commentator

=== Rashid ===
- Adil Rashid (born 1988), English cricketer
- Ahmed Rashid (born 1948), Pakistani author and revolutionary
- Amin Abu Rashid (born 1966/67), Palestinian-Dutch Hamas leader
- Ashraf Rashid (1948–2004), Pakistani Army general
- Gholam Ali Rashid (1953–2025), Iranian Army major general
- Karim Rashid (born 1960), American industrial designer
- Khalid Rashid (born 1970), Pakistani Guantanamo detainee
- Mamunur Rashid (born 1948), Bangladeshi actor, director, and scriptwriter
- Muhammad Rashid (field hockey, born 1941) (1941–2009), Pakistani hockey player
- Muhammad Rashid (field hockey, born 1992) (born 1992), Pakistani hockey player
- Osama Rashid (born 1992), Iraqi footballer
- Richard Rashid (born 1951), American computer science researcher
- Shaun Rashid, English cricketer

=== Rasyid ===
- Akbar Rasyid (born 1983), Indonesian footballer
- Ariff Ar-Rasyid (born 1998), Malaysian footballer
- Maesyal Rasyid (born 1965), Indonesian politician
- Muhd Noor Firdaus Ar-Rasyid (born 1996), Bruneian sprinter
- Tauffiq Ar-Rasyid (born 1995), Malaysian footballer

== See also ==
- Raschid
- Rashida (disambiguation)
- Reşid
- Rachid (disambiguation)
- Abdul Rashid (name)
- Arshad (disambiguation)
