= Rashid =

Rashid or Rachid (Arabic: راشد [raːʃɪd]) and Rasheed (Arabic: رشيد [raʃiːd]), which means "rightly guided", may refer to:

- Rashidun, the first four "rightly guided" caliphs according to Sunni Islam
- Rashid (name), also Rachid and Rasheed, people with the given name or surname
- Rached, a given name and surname
- Rashad, a surname
- Rishad, a given name

== Places ==
- Rachid, Mauritania, a town at the foot of the Tagant Plateau
- Rashid, Iran, a village in Khuzestan Province
- Rashid, Yemen, a village
- Rashid, alternate name of Tang-e Goraz, Iran
- Rosetta, anglicized name of the city and port of Rashid in Egypt

== Characters ==
- Rashid (Street Fighter), a character in the Street Fighter universe
- Rashid Saluja, a character in the Magi universe

== Other uses ==
- Rachid, an American singer known for his 1998 single "Pride"
- Egyptian frigate Rasheed
- Rashid, a United Arab Emirates rover that crash landed on the Moon in 2024
- Rasheed Air Base, an Iraqi Air Force base on the outskirts of Baghdad, Iraq
- Rasheed Bank, the second largest bank in Iraq
- Rasheed Carbine, an Egyptian semiautomatic rifle
- Rasheed Wallace, an American former professional basketball player

== See also ==
- Rashida (disambiguation)
- Al-Rashid (disambiguation), also ar-Rashid, Al-Rasheed and other spelling variations
- Rashidi dynasty, an Arabian dynasty from 1836 to 1921
- Rashidun Caliphate, the reign of the first four Islamic caliphs following the death of Muhammad
