= 2020–21 Medeama S.C. season =

Medeama S.C
- Chairman: Dr Anthony Aubynn
- Manager: Samuel Boadu
- Stadium: TNA Park; Tarkwa, western region, Ghana
- Premier League: 5th
- FA Cup: Knockout round 16
- All statistics correct as of 11 August 2021.

The 2021–21 season of Ghanaian club Medeama S.C . The season covered the period from 20 November 2020 to 8 August 2021

== Overview ==
Medeama ended the 2020-21 season without a trophy after placing fifth in the domestic the league and was knock out by Accra Hearts of Oak in the FA Cup

== Technical team ==
The technical team

Position	Name
Head coach	(Ghana) Samuel Boadu

== Squad ==
As of January 2021. Note: Flags indicate national team as defined under FIFA eligibility rules; some limited exceptions apply. Players may hold more than one non-FIFA nationality.

No.	Pos.	Nation	Player
1	GK	(Ghana) GHA	Dacosta Owusu
2	DF	(Ghana) GHA	Daniel Egyin
3	MF	(Ghana) GHA	Agyei Boakye
4	DF	(Ghana) GHA	Ibrahim Yaro
5	DF	(Ghana) GHA	Rashid Alhassan
6	DF	(Ghana) GHA	Richard Boadu
7	MF	(Ghana) GHA	Eric Kwakwa
8	MF	(Ghana) GHA	Patrick Yeboah
10	FW	(Ghana) GHA	Joseph Tetteh Zutah
11	FW	(Ghana) GHA	Abass Mohammed
12	GK	(Ghana) GHA	Frank Boateng
13	DF	(Ghana) GHA	Bright Enchil
14	DF	(Ghana) GHA	Fatawu Sulemana
15	DF	(Ghana) GHA	Ali Ouattara
16	GK	(Ghana) GHA	Eric Ofori Antwi
17	FW	(Ghana) GHA	Abdul-Basit Adam

No.	Pos.	Nation	Player
19	DF	(Ghana) GHA	Baba Abdulai Musah
20	FW	(Ghana) GHA	Godfred Kwadwo Asamoah
21	MF	(Ghana) GHA	Jasper Nimo Nartey
22	MF	(Ghana) GHA	Michael Yeboah
23	MF	(Ghana) GHA	Rashid Nortey
24	MF	(Ghana) GHA	Samuel Appiah
25	MF	(Ghana) GHA	Justice Blay
26	FW	(Ghana) GHA	Meshack Odoom
27	MF	(Ghana) GHA	Godfred Abban
28	FW	(Ghana) GHA	Nana Dadson
29	MF	(Ghana) GHA	Kwasi Donsu
30	MF	(Ghana) GHA	Ebenezer Ackahbi
31	MF	(Ghana) GHA	Prince Opoku Agyemang
32	FW	(Burkina Faso) BFA	Ahmed Touré
33	FW	(Ghana) GHA	Zakaria Mumuni
35	DF	(Ghana) GHA	Vincent Atinga

== Competitions ==
=== Premier League ===
==== League table ====
Pos	Team	Pld	W	D	L	GF	GA	GD	Pts
3	WAFA	34	16	8	10	46	38	+8	56
4	Aduana Stars	34	16	7	11	44	42	+2	55
5	Medeama	34	15	9	10	38	34	+4	54
6	Great Olympics	34	15	7	12	37	33	+4	52
7	Dreams	34	13	10	11	45	35	+10	49

Updated to match(es) played on 18 July 2021. Source: type=Goal.com
