= Khutaba =

Khutaba (Russian: Хутаба) is an Abkhaz surname. Notable people with the surname include:

- Bagrat Khutaba (born 1982), Abkhaz wrestler and sports official
- Rashid Khutaba (born 1951), Abkhaz wrestler and sports official, father of Bagrat
