= Arshad =

Arshad is an Arabic male given name and a surname. It means "the right path".

Notable people with the name include:

== Given name ==
- Arshad Ali (disambiguation), several people
- Arshad Ayub (born 1958), Indian cricketer
- Arshad Hasan (born 1980), executive director at Democracy for America (DFA)
- Arshad Hussain (boxer, born 1990) (born 1990), amateur Pakistani boxer
- Arshad Khan (disambiguation), several people
- Arshad Laeeq (born 1970), Pakistani cricketer
- Arshad Mehmood (composer), Pakistani actor, music composer and singer
- Arshad Mehmood (singer), Pakistani singer
- Arshad Pervez (1953–2024), Pakistani cricketer
- Arshad Sharif (1973–2022), Pakistani journalist, writer and photographer
- Arshad Tahmasbi, Iranian musician
- Arshad Warsi (born 1968), Indian actor

== Surname ==
- Abdul Rahman Arshad (1936–2020), Malaysian academic, educator and diplomat
- Abdul Rahman bin Arshad, Singaporean convicted robber and culprit of the 1994 Oriental Hotel murder case
- Humza Arshad (born 1985), British-Pakistani actor, comedian, writer and YouTube personality
- Joseph Arshad (born 1964), Bishop of the Roman Catholic Diocese of Faisalabad
- Muhammad Arshad Misbahi (born 1968), Imam of Manchester Central Mosque Victoria Park since 1997, Chair of AKSA (Al-Karam Scholars Association)
- Sudirman Arshad (1954–1992), Malaysian singer and songwriter

== See also ==
- Ahad
- Arad (disambiguation)
- Arsha
- Asad
- Asha
