= Sulemana =

Sulemana is a West African masculine given name and surname. Notable people with the name include:

== Given name ==
- Sulemana Alhassan, Ghanaian politician
- Sulemana Alijata (born 1975), Ghanaian politician and social worker
- Sulemana Ibun Iddrisu (born 1955), Ghanaian politician
- Sulemana Abdul Samed (1994–2026), tallest man in Ghana

== Surname ==
- Abdul Hakim Sulemana (born 2005), Ghanaian footballer
- Adama Sulemana (born 1978), Ghanaian politician
- Alhassan Tampuli Sulemana (born 1976), Ghanaian politician
- Fatawu Sulemana (born 2003), Ghanaian footballer
- Ibrahim Sulemana, several people
- Kamaldeen Sulemana (born 2002), Ghanaian footballer
- Memunatu Sulemana (born 1977), Ghanaian footballer
- Mohammed Sulemana (born 2002), Ghanaian footballer
- Yusif Sulemana (born 1972), Ghanaian politician
