= Raschid =

Raschid or al-Raschid is a surname, a variant spelling of Rashid. It is the surname of:

- Omar bey Al-Raschid (1839–1911), German publicist
- Franz Raschid (1954–2010), German footballer
- Louiqa Raschid (born 1958), Sri Lankan-American computer scientist
- Mahbubur Raschid, Pakistani banker
