= Rached =

Rached or Rachid is a masculine given name and surname of Arabic origin. Notable people with the name include:

== Given name ==
=== Rached ===
- Rached Arfaoui (born 1996), Tunisian footballer
- Rached Boudhina (born 1949), Tunisian handball player
- Rached Ghannouchi (born 1941), Tunisian politician
- Rached Meddeb (born 1940), Tunisian footballer
- Rached Merdassi, Tunisian boxer

=== Rachid ===
- Rachid (singer) (born 1973/74), American singer-songwriter and music producer
- Rachid Adghigh (born 1961), Algerian footballer
- Rachid Aftouche (born 1933), Algerian footballer
- Rachid Baba Ahmed (1946–1995), Algerian record producer, composer, and singer
- Rachid Aït-Atmane (born 1993), French-Algerian footballer
- Rachid Talbi Alami (born 1958), Moroccan politician
- Rachid Ben Ali (born 1978), Moroccan-Dutch painter
- Rachid Alioui (born 1992), French-Moroccan footballer
- Rachid Ammar (born 1947/48), Tunisian Army officer
- Rachid Amrane (born 1974), Algerian footballer
- Rachid Arhab (born 1955), French-Algerian journalist
- Rachid Arma (born 1985), Moroccan footballer
- Rachid Azzedine (born 1982), French boxer
- Rachid Azzouzi (born 1971), Moroccan footballer
- Rachid Badouri (born 1976), Moroccan-Canadian comedian
- Rachid Baldé (born 2000), Bissau-Guinean footballer
- Rachid El Basir (born 1968), Moroccan middle distance runner
- Rachid Belabed (born 1980), Belgian-Moroccan footballer
- Rachid Belhout (1944–2020), Algerian football manager and player
- Rachid Belkacem (1973–2005), Dutch-Moroccan terror suspect
- Rachid Benallal (born 1946), Algerian film director, screenwriter, editor, and actor
- Rachid Benayen (born 1979), French-Algerian footballer
- Rachid Benhadj (born 1949), Algerian film director and screenwriter
- Rachid Benmahmoud (born 1971), Moroccan football manager and player
- Rachid Berouas (born 1977), Moroccan footballer
- Rachid Berradi (born 1975), Italian-Moroccan long-distance runner
- Rachid Bladehane (born 1957), Algerian politician
- Rachid Bouaita (born 1974), French boxer
- Rachid Bouaouzan (born 1984), Dutch-Moroccan footballer
- Rachid Bouarrata (born 1958), Algerian football manager and player
- Rachid Bouchareb (born 1953), French film director and producer
- Rachid Boudjedra (born 1941), Algerian poet, novelist, playwright, and critic
- Rachid Bouhenna (born 1991), French-Algerian footballer
- Rachid Bourabia (born 1985), French footballer
- Rachid Chékhémani (born 1973), French long-distance runner
- Rachid Chihab (born 1961), Moroccan football manager
- Rachid Chirino (born 2000), Costa Rican footballer
- Rachid Chouhal (born 1975), Moroccan-Maltese athlete
- Rachid Daoudi (born 1966), Moroccan footballer
- Rachid Derbass (born 1941), Lebanese politician
- Rachid Deriche (born 1954), French-Algerian medical researcher
- Rachid Djebaili (born 1975), French-Algerian footballer
- Rachid Driss (1917–2009), Tunisian diplomat and writer
- Rachid Farssi (born 1985), Belgian footballer
- Rachid Ferhani (1945–2025), Algerian singer
- Rachid Ferrahi (born 1985), Algerian footballer
- Rachid Ghaflaoui (born 1973), Moroccan football coach
- Rachid Ghanimi (born 2001), Moroccan footballer
- Rachid Ghanmouni (born 1978), Moroccan long-distance runner
- Rachid Ghezzal (born 1992), French-Algerian footballer
- Rachid Guerraoui (born 1967), Moroccan-Swiss computer scientist
- Rachid Habchaoui (born 1950), Algerian long-distance runner
- Rachid El-Haddak (born 1973), Moroccan boxer
- Rachid Hamdani (born 1985), French-Moroccan footballer
- Rachid El Hammouchi (born 1981), Moroccan-German footballer
- Rachid Harkouk (born 1956), British-Algerian footballer
- Rachid Hechiche (born 1973), French rugby league footballer
- Rachid Housni (born 1990), Moroccan footballer
- Rachid Idrissi (1939–1971), Moroccan nuclear chemist and engineer
- Rachid El Khalifi (born 1979), Dutch footballer
- Rachid Khdar (born 1967), Moroccan wrestler
- Rachid Khimoune (born 1953), French-Algerian sculptor
- Rachid Kisri (born 1975), Moroccan long-distance runner
- Rachid Koraïchi (born 1947), Algerian artist, sculptor, print-maker, and ceramicist
- Rachid Kouda (born 2002), Italian footballer
- Rachid Kram (born 1963), Algerian middle-distance runner
- Rachid Ksentini (1887–1944), Algerian actor and comedian
- Rachid Lousteque, Moroccan football manager
- Rachid Maâtar (born 1959), French-Algerian football manager and player
- Rachid Madkour (born 1977), Moroccan footballer
- Rachid Madrane (born 1968), Belgian-Moroccan politician and journalist
- Rachid ben Massoundi, Comorian politician
- Rachid Mekhloufi (1936–2024), French-Algerian football player and coach
- Rachid Mesli, Algerian human rights lawyer and activist
- Rachid Meziane (born 1980), French basketball coach
- Rachid Mimouni (1945–1995), Algerian writer, teacher, and human rights activist
- Rachid El Morabity (born 1982), Moroccan athlete
- Rachid Mouffouk (born 1955), Algerian sculptor
- Rachid Muratake (born 2002), Japanese track and field athlete
- Rachid Nadji (born 1988), Algerian footballer
- Rachid Nakhle (1873–1939), Lebanese poet, writer, and journalist
- Rachid Natouri (1946–2017), Algerian footballer
- Rachid Nekkaz (born 1972), Algerian businessman and political activist
- Rachid Neqrouz (born 1972), Moroccan footballer
- Rachid Niny (born 1970), Moroccan journalist, chronicler, and editor
- Rachid O. (born 1970), Moroccan writer
- Rachid O'Neale (born 1991), Barbadian cricketer
- Rachid Ofrany (born 1987), Dutch-Moroccan footballer
- Rachid El Ouali (born 1965), Moroccan actor, producer, director, and TV host
- Rachid Mohamed Rachid (born 1955), Egyptian entrepreneur and investor
- Rachid Ramda (born 1969), Algerian convicted criminal
- Rachid Rguig (born 1980), Moroccan judoka
- Rachid Rokki (born 1974), Moroccan footballer
- Rachid Roussafi (born 1970), Moroccan windsurfer
- Rachid Sabbagh (died 2026), Tunisian politician
- Rachid Sfar (1933–2023), Tunisian politician
- Rachid Sidibé (born 1990), Burkinabe judoka
- Rachid Solh (1926–2014), Lebanese politician
- Rachid Soualhi (1949–2026), Algerian footballer
- Rachid Soulaimani (born 1982), Moroccan footballer
- Rachid Tabti (1930–2009), Algerian spy, lawyer, actor, and boxer
- Rachid Taha (1958–2018), French-Algerian singer and activist
- Rachid Taoussi (born 1959), Moroccan football manager and player
- Rachid Temal (born 1973), French politician
- Rachid Tiberkanine (born 1985), Belgian-Moroccan footballer
- Rachid Turki (1918–2003), Tunisian football manager
- Rachid Yazami (born 1953), Moroccan scientist, engineer, and inventor
- Rachid Ziar (born 1973), Algerian long-distance runner

== Surname ==
=== Rached ===
- Choubeila Rached (1933–2008), Tunisian singer
- Emil Assad Rached (1943–2009), Brazilian basketball player
- Emilio Rached (born 1959), Argentine politician
- Gabrielle Bou Rached, (born 1985), Lebanese model
- Mohamed Rached Meddeb (born 1940), Tunisian footballer
- Tahani Rached (born 1947), Canadian-Egyptian documentary filmmaker

=== Rachid ===
- Ahmad Baba Rachid (1946–1995), Algerian musician

== Places ==
- Beni Rached, Chlef, town and commune in Chlef Province, Algeria
- Ouled Rached, town and commune in Bouïra Province, Algeria
- Sidi Rached, town and commune in Tipaza Province, Algeria
- Tizi Rached, town and commune in Tizi Ouzou Province, Algeria

== See also ==
- Rashid (name), also spelled Rachid, another surname and given name
