= Asha (disambiguation) =

Asha is a concept of 'truth' or 'order' in the Zoroastrian religion.

Asha or ASHA may also refer to:

== Arts and entertainment ==
=== Fictional characters ===
- Asha, the heroine of Wonder Boy: Asha in Monster World
- Asha Greyjoy, in George R. R. Martin's A Song of Ice and Fire novels
- Asha, in the 2006 film Outsourced
- DS Asha Israni, in Shetland, series 3
- Asha, the protagonist of the 2023 animated film Wish

=== Works ===
- Asha (1980 film)
- Asha (album), a 1995 studio album by Zubeen Garg
- Brimful of Asha, a 1997 song by Cornershop
- "Asha" (Ewoks episode)
- Asha, a 2025 Indian film by Deepak Patil

== Organizations ==
- American School Health Association
- American Schools and Hospitals Abroad, a USAID program
- American Seniors Housing Association
- American Sexual Health Association
- Accredited Social Health Activist, community health workers in India
- American Speech–Language–Hearing Association
- American Student Health Association, original name for the American College Health Association
- Asha for Education

== People ==
- Asha Banks (born 2003), English actress
- Asha Bhosle (1933–2026), Indian film playback singer
- Asha Jaquilla Degree (born 1990), missing American child in 2000
- Asha Kreimer (born 1989), missing Australian woman in 2015
- Asha Noppeney (born 1954), Ugandan-German athlete
- Asha Parekh (born 1942), Indian actress of the 1960s–1970s
- Asha Posley (1927–1998), Pakistani actress and singer
- Asha Puthli, Indian-born jazz singer
- Aṣa (pronounced "Àshá"), Nigerian-French singer
- Asha Sharma (born 1989), American business executive

== Other uses ==
- Asha, Russia, a town
- Nokia Asha series, smartphones using the Series 40 operating system
- Asha - African American Collection, a short lived doll line from Mattel; see The Marvelous World of Shani § Asha - African American Collection

== See also ==
- Aasha (disambiguation)
- Ascha, a municipality in Straubing-Bogen, Bavaria, Germany
- Arsha (disambiguation)
- Assia, Cyprus, a village
