= Raşit =

Raşit is a Turkish given name for males. People named Raşit include:

- Raşit Çetiner (born 1956), Turkish football coach
- Raşit Küçük (1947–2022), Turkish Islamist
- Raşit Meredow (born 1960), Turkmenistan politician
- Raşit Pertev (born 1958), Secretary of the International Fund for Agricultural Development
- Raşit Tolun (1920–2000), Turkish alpine skier
- Raşit Öztaş (1920-?), Turkish athlete
- Räşit Wahapov (1908–1962), Tatar singer

== See also ==
- Rashid (name)
- Reşid
- Rashit
