= Muhammad Arshad =

Muhammad Arshad may refer to:

- Muhammad Arshad (kabaddi) (born 1979), Pakistani kabaddi player
- Muhammad Arshad (defender), member of the Pakistan national football team in the 1974 Asian Games
- Muhammad Arshad (footballer, born 1976), member of the Pakistan national football team in the 2002 FIFA World Cup qualification
- Muhammad Arshad (field hockey), player for Pakistan in the 2007 Men's Hockey Asia Cup
- Muhammad Arshad Chaudhry, Pakistani politician
- Muhammad Arshad Javed, Pakistani politician
- Muhammad Arshad Khan, Pakistani artist
- Muhammad Arshad Khan Leghari, Pakistani politician
- Muhammad Arshad Khan Lodhi, Pakistani politician
- Muhammad Arshad Malik, Pakistani politician
- Muhammad Arshad Malik (weightlifter)
- Muhammad Arshad Misbahi, Imam
