= Arsha =

Arsha, also spelled Aarsha, may refer to:

== Places ==
- Arsha, Purulia, West Bengal, India
  - Arsha (community development block)
  - Arsha Assembly constituency
  - Arsha College

== People ==
- Arsha Ovanesova (1906 – 1990), Soviet Armenian filmmaker
- Aarsha Chandini Baiju (born 2000), Indian actress

== Others ==
- Arsha prayoga, Sanskrit grammar
- Arsha Vidya Gurukulam, religious institutes in India

== See also ==
- Arshad (disambiguation)
- Asha (disambiguation), Zoroastrian divinity
