= Men's Gymnasium =

Men's Gymnasium may refer to:

- Men's Gymnasium, University of Arizona, now Bear Down Gym
- Men's Gymnasium-University of Arkansas, Fayetteville, now Faulkner Performing Arts Center
- Men's Gymnasium (University of Chicago), Illinois
- Men's Gymnasium (Indiana University)
- Men's Gymnasium (University of North Texas), now Ken Bahnsen Gym
- Men's Gymnasium Building (Baku)

== See also ==
- Men's Gym (UCLA) or Student Activities Center, UCLA, California
- Men's Gym (Berkeley), now the Haas Pavilion
- Women's Gymnasium (disambiguation)
