= Shaki Museum of History and Local Lore =

Museum in Sheki, Azerbaijan

Shaki Museum of History and Local Lore named after Rashid bey Efendiyev
- Azerbaijani: Rəşid bəy Əfəndiyev adına Şəki şəhər Tarix-diyarşünaslıq muzeyi
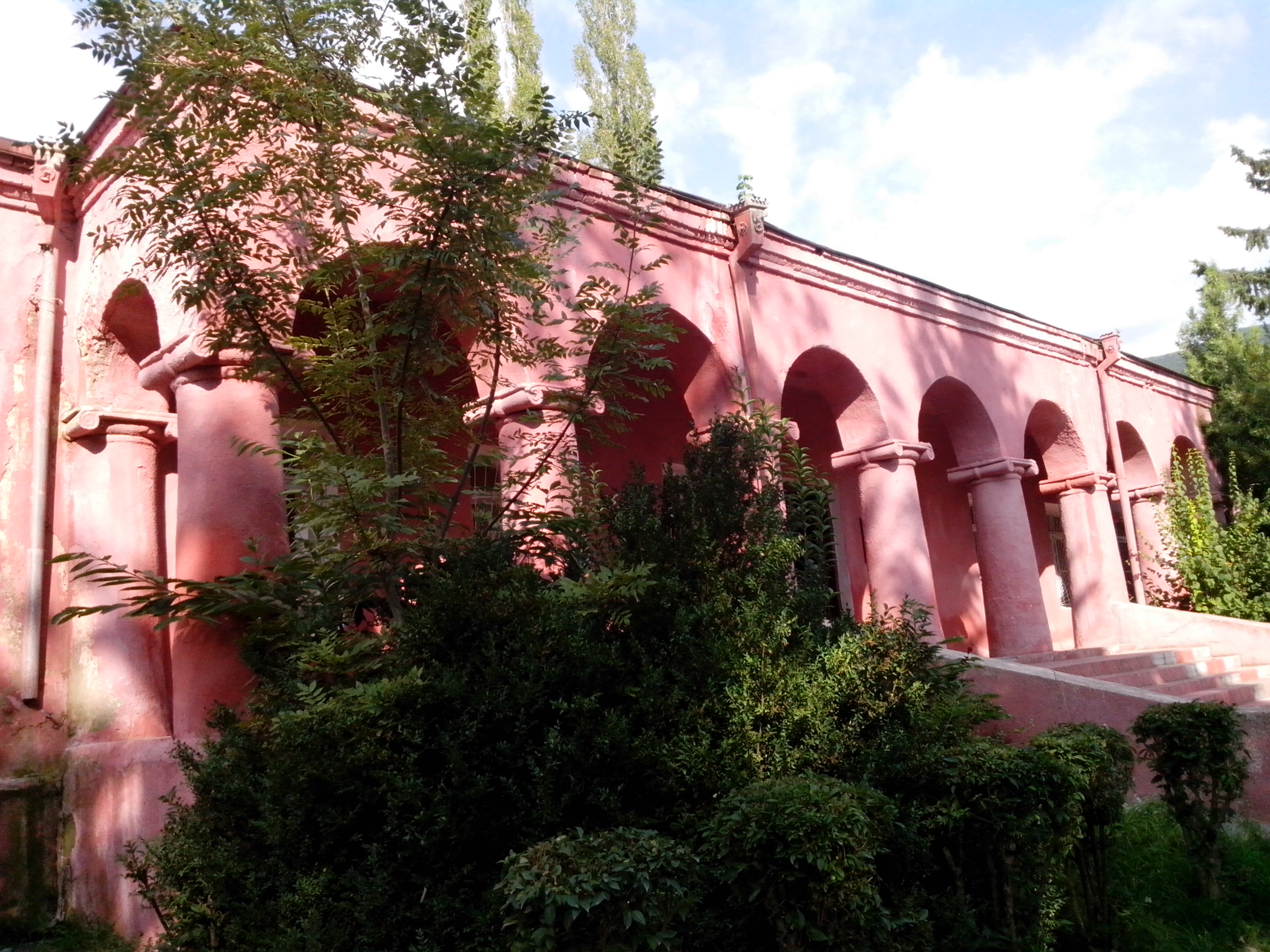

- Location within Azerbaijan
- Established: September 1925; 100 years ago
- Location: Mirza Fatali Akhundov Street, Shaki, Azerbaijan
- Coordinates: 41°12′13″N 47°11′44″E
- Type: Archaeology, ethnography
- Collection size: 5000+
- Director: Yagut Jalalova

The Shaki Museum of History and Local Lore is a museum located in Sheki city of the Republic of Azerbaijan. The museum is named after the Azerbaijani pedagogue, writer and ethnographer Rashid bey Efendiyev.

== History ==
The Shaki Museum of History and Local Lore was established under decision of Commissariat for Education in September 1925. In 1980, the museum moved to a building, which was built as a barracks in 1895.

The total area of the museum is 924 m^{2} and 724 m^{2} of it are reserved for the exhibition halls. More than 5000 exhibits reflecting the history, culture, ancient art forms, ethnography and cuisine of Shaki are exhibited in the museum. Nearly 3,000 of them are exhibited in exposition rooms. There are also stands reflecting participation of Shaki people in Great Patriotic War (1941–1945), as well as in Afghanistan war and the first Karabakh war.

Open door is held on the first Sunday of May each year, which means visitors can enter the museum free of charge.

The museum consists of the following departments:

- Nature
- Ancient era
- Ethnography
- Azerbaijan Democratic Republic
- Science, culture, health figures
- Battle victory
- Silking
- Agriculture
- Table and kitchen culture of Shaki
- Lecture room
