= Women's Gymnasium =

Women's Gymnasium may refer to:

- Hearst Gymnasium for Women, Berkeley, California, listed on the National Register of Historic Places (NRHP) in Alameda County
- Women's Gymnasium (Gainesville, Florida), NRHP-listed
- Women's Gymnasium, Northwestern State University, Natchitoches, Louisiana, NRHP-listed in Natchitoches Parish
- Women's Gymnasium, University of Illinois at Urbana-Champaign, Urbana, Illinois, NRHP-listed in Champaign County

== See also ==
- Men's Gymnasium (disambiguation)
