= Rashod =

Rashod is a given name. Notable people with the given name include:

- Rashod Bateman (born 1999), American football player
- Rashod Berry (born 1996), American football player
- Rashod Hill (born 1992), American football player
- Rashod Kent (born 1980), American football player
- Rashod Moulton (born 1981), American football player
- Rashod Owens (born 2001), American football player
- Rashod Swinger (born 1974), American football player

== See also ==
- Rashad
