= Rashad =

Rashad can be a given name or a surname. Notable people with the name include:

== Surname ==
- Ahmad Rashad (born 1949), American football player and sportcaster
- Ali Akbar Rashad (born 1955), Iranian philosopher and Islamic scholar
- Isaiah Rashad (born 1991), American rapper
- Phylicia Rashad (born 1948), American actress

== Given name ==
- Rashad al-Alimi, Yemeni politician
- Rashad Anderson (born 1983), American basketball player
- Rashad Carmichael (born 1988), American football player
- Rashad Coulter (born 1981), American mixed martial artist
- Rashaad Coward (born 1994), American football player
- Rashad Davis (born 1996), Bahamian basketballer
- Rashad Evans (born 1979), American mixed martial arts fighter
- Rashad Fenton (born 1997), American football player
- Rashad Greene (born 1992), American football player
- Rashad Haughton (born 1977), American writer, director, and actor
- Ra'Shad James (born 1990), American basketball player
- Rashad Jennings (born 1985), American football player
- Rashad Johnson (born 1986), American football player
- Rashad Jones-Jennings (born 1984), American basketball player
- Rashad Khalifa (1935–1990), Egyptian-American biochemist
- Rashad Madden (born 1992), American basketball player
- Rashad McCants (born 1984), American basketball player
- Rashad Moore (born 1979), American football player
- Rashaad Penny (born 1996), American football player
- Rashad Pharaon (1912–1990), Syrian-born Saudi Arabian doctor and politician
- Rashad Phillips (born 1978), American basketball player
- Rashad Robinson (born 1978), American civil rights leader
- Rashad Rochelle (born 2003), American football player
- Rashad Ross (born 1990), American football player
- Rashad Smith (disambiguation), multiple people
- Rashad Vaughn (born 1996), American basketball player
- Rashad Washington (born 1980), American football player
- Rashad Weaver (born 1997), American football player

== See also ==
- Rashad languages, a Sudanese language family
- Rashid (disambiguation)
- Rashod
- Rishad
