= Arshad Ali =

Arshad Ali may refer to:

- Arshad Ali (cricketer) (born 1976), Pakistani–Emirati cricket player
- Arshad Ali (Pakistani politician), Pakistani politician
- Arshad Ali (British politician), British politician

== See also ==
- Arshad Ali Chaudhry (1950–2015), Pakistani field hockey player
- Arshad Ali Khan (born 1984), Indian classical singer
- Ali Arshad Mir (1951–2008), Punjabi poet and writer
