= Arshad Khan =

Arshad Khan may refer to:

- Arshad Khan (Indian cricketer) (born 1997)
- Arshad Khan (Pakistani cricketer) (born 1971)
- Arshad Khan (Canadian filmmaker), Pakistani-Canadian filmmaker
- Arshad Ayub Khan (born 1967), Pakistani politician and businessman
- Arshad Sami Khan (1942–2009), Pakistani diplomat, bureaucrat, and soldier
- Arshad Khan (Indian politician) (born 1960)

== See also ==
- Muhammad Arshad Khan (born 1969), Pakistani artist
- Muhammad Arshad Khan Leghari, Pakistani politician, member of National Assembly since 2013
- Abu Ahmed al-Kuwaiti (died 2011), also known as Arshad Khan, Pakistani al-Qaeda member and courier for Osama bin Laden
