= Topchubashov Center =

Azerbaijani think tank

- Topçubaşov Mərkəzi
- Nickname: TopCenter
- Named after: Alimardan bey Topchubashov
- Established: April 2018; 8 years ago
- Founders: Rusif Huseynov (director); Murad Muradov (deputy director)
- Type: Nonprofit
- Purpose: international relations and security
- Location: Baku, Azerbaijan
- Coordinates: 40.3851648°N 49.8280352°E
- Official languages: Azerbaijani, English
- Website: top-center.org/az

The Topchubashov Center (Azerbaijani: Topçubaşov Mərkəzi) is a Baku-based think tank that focuses on international relations and security.

== History ==
The Topchubashov Center was established in April 2018 by the same team that operated Politicon, an online platform for authors writing about politics and governance. Rusif Huseynov (director) and Murad Muradov (deputy director) are the center's co-founders. It operates within the framework of the Regional Studies Public Union in Baku.

== Activity ==
The activity of the Topchubashov Center is based on the results of various research programs. International and domestic politics, geopolitics, security, state policy, and the economics of the South Caucasus, the Middle East, Eastern Europe, and Eurasia are all studied by the research program. One of the center's key missions is to keep the world media informed about developments in Azerbaijan, the political process, and the situation in Karabakh. The center's articles have also been published in the Western media. The Topchubashov Center has hosted conferences, held competitions, and contributed to the publication of books during its existence. Furthermore, the center serves as a consultant to a number of media companies and organizations. Macedonian, Serbian, and Bosniak journalists were invited to the territories recaptured by Azerbaijan in Karabakh following the 2020 war on the center's initiative.

The center contains a number of media outlets; the online outlets of Topchubashov Center, Politicon, and Şərqə baxış are among them. Press coverage of political, economic, and historical issues, and also various analytical materials and reports, are the main activities of these outlets.

== Cooperation ==
Topchubashov Center have partnered with Azerbaijan's ADA University and The Center for International Relations Analysis. It also collaborates with the Ankara Center for Crisis and Political Studies (ANKASAM; Turkey), the German Marshall Fund (GMF; USA-Germany), the German Council on Foreign Relations (DGAP; Germany), the Konrad Adenauer Foundation (KAS), the Friedrich Ebert Foundation (FES; both Germany), the Center for Global and Strategic Studies (CGSS; Pakistan), the New Eastern Europe (NEE), and Visegrad Insight (both Poland).

== Reception ==
The Topchubashov Center is listed in the Caspian Media Project of Harvard University's Center for Russian and Eurasian Studies as a recommended source for Azerbaijan.

== Events ==
The first major event held by the Topchubashov Center was the Topchubashov Conference on Security: Security Issues in Eastern Europe and the Post-Soviet Space. Foreign and local political scientists, as well as other guests, attended the conference in January 2019. Panel talks on the topics of "Assessment of security strategies in Eastern Europe" and "Post-Soviet countries: border security balancing" were held during the conference.

The center had launched a series of seminars on the topic of "The Future of Karabakh in 2021," in partnership with the Yerevan-based Center for Political and Economic Strategic Studies. On 11 May 2021, the first part of the cycle "The Fate of Karabakh in 2021–2025 and Beyond" was held. Rusif Huseynov of the Topchubashov Center and Benjamin Poghosyan of the Center for Political and Economic Strategic Studies coordinated the project. The Friedrich Ebert Foundation's Felix Hess and Salome Alania moderated the sessions. The second part of the series, "Relations Between Turkey and Russia and Karabakh," was held on 3 June, followed by "The Role of the US and the EU in the Post-Karabakh War: Humanitarian Aid And Its Impact", on 30 June, "The Role of the OSCE Minsk Group in the Post-Karabakh War" on 12 September, "The role of Iran in the South Caucasus after the Karabakh War in 2020" on 8 October, while the sixth and final part of the series "Opportunities for Open Communication Lines after the Second Karabakh War and Its Impact on the Border Population" was held on 2 November.

On November 8, the center hosted a public lecture on "Hybrid Threats in Europe: Using Social Media as a Weapon" by Portuguese security specialist Felipe Manuel Pate Duarte.

The center hosted an event titled "A Year After the War: A Look into the Past and Future" on November 24. Representatives from government agencies and civic society, as well as think tanks, students, and the media, were in attendance. Speakers included Fuad Chiragov, Heydar Mirza, Farhad Mammadov, and Rusif Huseynov.

== Publications ==
- "Azərbaycanın Təşəkkülü" (Azerbaijani). Baku: Topçubaşov Mərkəzi, "Çapar". 2021.
