= Reşid =

Reşid or Reşit is a Turkish name, derived from the Arabic Rashid (رشيد), and may refer to:

- Koca Mustafa Reşid Pasha (1800–1858), Ottoman statesman and chief architect of the Tanzimat reforms
- Reşid Mehmed Pasha (1780–1839), Ottoman general and Grand Vizier
- Mehmed Reşid (1873–1919), Ottoman physician, governor
- Reşid Akif Paşa (1863–1920), Ottoman statesman of Albanian descent
- Tosinê Reşîd (born 1941), Kurdish writer, poet and playwright
- Reşit Galip (1893–1934), Turkish politician
- Reşit Süreyya Gürsey (1889–1962), Turkish intellectual
- Reşit Kaynak (1952–1999), Turkish footballer
- Reşit Karabacak (1954–2020), Turkish wrestler
- Reşit Ronabar (1868–1924), Ottoman governor
- Reşit Rahmeti Arat (1900–1964), Turkish philologist of Tatar descent

== See also ==
- Raşit
- Rashid (name)
