= Rashid Ismayilov =

Rashid Bey Ismayilov
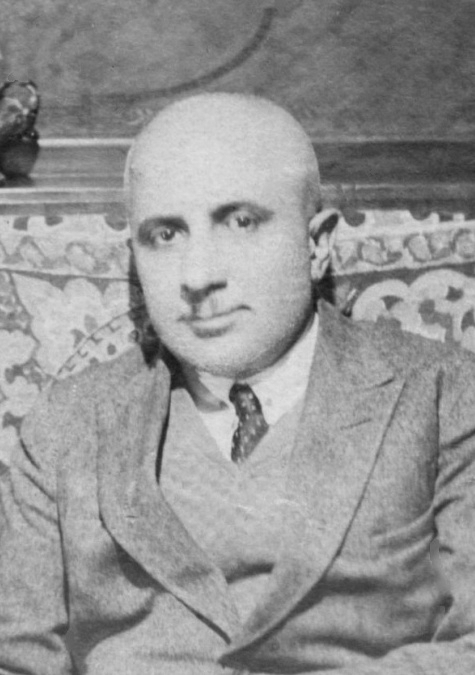
- Born: 1877; Yerevan, Yerevan Governorate, Russian Empire
- Died: 1942 (aged 64–65); Solovki prison camp, Archangelsk Oblast, Soviet Union

Rashid Bey Ismayilov (Azerbaijani: Rəşid bəy İsmayılov; 1877 — 1942) was an Azerbaijani historian, publicist, and educator.

== Life ==
Ismayilov was born in 1877 in Yerevan, Armenia, Russian Empire. After completing his secondary education, he attended the Erivan Teachers' Seminary. His older brother, Kerim Ismayilov, graduated from the Gori Teachers' Seminary in 1892 and was a contributor to the Molla Nasraddin magazine. Later, their family moved to Nukha, a city in Azerbaijan. Ismayilov completed his seminary education in 1905.

In the early 20th century, like several other prominent Azerbaijani intellectuals of the time, Ismayilov, who wrote in both Russian and Azerbaijani, published numerous articles in the Caucasian and Russian press, addressing various social issues. His intellectual and ideological development was significantly influenced by the vibrant literary and social environment in Tiflis.

Ismayilov had aspirations to publish a comprehensive newspaper called Təzə zaman (New Time) but he was not granted permission to do so.

During the period of the Azerbaijan Democratic Republic, Ismayilov held a responsible position in the Council of Ministers and served as the Director of the Archives of the Government during the administrations of Fathali Khan Khoyski and Nasib bey Yusifbeyli from 1919 to 1920. On January 15, 1919, an extraordinary assembly of Azerbaijanis living in the Erivan Governorate was held in Baku, resulting in the establishment of the Muslim Solidarity Society for the Muslims of the Erivan Governorate. Ismayilov played an active role in this society, serving as its responsible secretary.

Following the fall of the Azerbaijan Democratic Republic, Ismayilov worked as a history teacher at School No.18 in Baku. In 1923, his book "Azərbaycan tarixi" (Azerbaijani History) was published, and it was later reprinted in 1993 by "Azernashr". This work represented the second significant initiative, after Abbasgulu Bakikhanov, to delve into the scientific study of Azerbaijani history, based on scholarly sources.

He worked as the Head of the Local Budget Department, and during his tenure, he prepared a detailed explanation letter about the first local budget and the second five-year plan (1933–1937) related to Azerbaijan's heavy and light industry. In 1928, he lived in Tiflis and worked at the Transcaucasian People's Commissariat of Agriculture Bank. He worked there until 1930.

In 1934, Ismayilov was arrested on suspicion of espionage and subversion by the State Political Directorate of the Azerbaijan SSR (later known as the Committee for State Security - KGB). Due to a lack of evidence, he was released six months later.

From 1935 to 1937, he worked in various positions at the leadership of the Caspian Sea Shipping Company, including Deputy Head of the Finance Department of Baku Port's Planning and Finance Directorate, Head of the Collection and Supervision Group at the Statistics Directorate, and Inspector of the Finance Department of the Caspian Sea Shipping Company.In 1937, he worked as a Russian language teacher at School No.1 in the Voroşilov District of Baku (nowadays Sabail District) and as a Russian language instructor at the Party Courses of the Central Committee of the Communist Party of Azerbaijan.

Ismayilov was arrested on September 13, 1938, for his alleged involvement in an "anti-Soviet nationalist organization" and was accused of being a "foreign espionage spy." He was taken to Moscow and detained in Butyrka prison for a period. That same year, he became a victim of political repression, leading to 15 years of imprisonment, during which he was deprived of his freedom and sent to the Solovetsky labor camp, where he joined thousands of other political prisoners.

In 1942 Ismayilov died in the Solovetsky labor camp, which was in the Arkhangelsk Region.

== Activity ==
In 1903, he started his activities in the "Eastern Russia" newspaper. In addition to this, he published articles in Russian-language publications in the Caucasus and Russia ("Kavkaz","Tiflisskiy listok," "Novoye obozreniye," "Sankt-Peterburqskiye vedomosti," etc.). Rashid Ismayilov worked in the "Tiflisskiy listok" newspaper for a year. He had close connections with prominent figures of the time, such as Mohammad Agha Shakhtakhtinski, Jalil Mammadguluzade, Omar Faig Nemanzade, Abdullah Sour, Ahmad Agaoghlu, Alimardan Topchubashi, and others, and worked together with them. After the publication of the "Shargi rus" newspaper was discontinued, he led the "Musalman hayati" (Muslim Life) and "Yakhin Sharg" (Near East) sections of the "Novoye obozreniye" newspaper.

Rashid Ismayilov was also a literary critic and historian. In this regard, his books "Avropa rəsmi-adəti" ( European official Etiquette) and "Müxtəsər Qafqaz tarixi" published in Tiflis, are noteworthy. The full title of his book "Müxtəsər Qafqaz tarixi və Zaqafqasiyada zühur edən məşhur türk ədib və şairlərinin müxtəsərən tərcümeyi-halları" (Selected Translations and Works of Famous Turkish Writers and Poets in Transcaucasian History and Azerbaijan.) was published in 1904. In this book, he addressed some issues related to the history of the Caucasus, including Azerbaijan, in the 19th century.

In 1905, several individuals, including Jalil Mammadguluzade, Rashid Ismayilov, the translator of the Military-People's Administration of the Caucasus, Mammad Vekilov, and Abdulmabud Mustafayev from Shaki, submitted a petition to the Caucasus censorship committee to publish newspapers in Azerbaijani. They intended to publish daily literary and social newspapers with names like "Novruz," "Teze zaman," "İgbal," "Gumru," and "Gunchıkhan." The first three of these individuals were actively involved in the literary and social environment in Tiflis. Rashid Ismayilov applied to the Caucasus authorities to obtain permission for the publication of the newspaper "Teze zaman." However, his pan-Islamist affiliations were used as an excuse to deny permission for the newspaper's publication.

His book "Azerbaycan tarikhi" (Azerbaijani History), which sheds light on the history of Azerbaijan from ancient times to the establishment of Soviet rule in April 1920, was published in Baku in 1923. The section titled "Maverayi-Qafqazın elani-istiqlalı" covers the situation on the eve of the establishment of the Azerbaijan Democratic Republic, while the section "Azərbaycan Cümhuriyyəti" is dedicated to the Republic's formation and activities. Rashid Ismayilov's work marked the second major effort in the field of researching Azerbaijani history based on scientific sources, following Abbasgulu Bakikhanov's contributions.
