= Rishad =

Rishad is a masculine given name.

== People with the given name ==
- Rishad Bathiudeen (born 1972), Sri Lankan politician
- Rishad Hossain (born 2002), Bangladeshi cricketer
- Rishad Naoroji (born 1951), Indian billionaire
- Rishad P. P. (born 1995), Indian professional footballer
- Rishad Premji, Indian business executive
- Rishad Seecheran, Trinidad and Tobago politician
- Rishad Zahir, United States–based Afghan singer and musician

== See also ==
- Rashad
- Rashid
