= Al-Rashid =

Al-Rashid, ar-Rashid ("the Righteous"), Al-Rasheed or Al Rasheed may refer to:

- Ar-Rashīd, one of the names of God in Islam, meaning "Guide to the Right Path"

== People ==
- Abdullah bin Ali Al Rashid, founder of the Emirate of Jabal Shammar
- Abdulaziz bin Mutaib Al Rashid, Emir of Jabal Shammar from 1897 to 1906
- Abdulaziz bin Saud Al Rashid, son of Fahda bint Asi bin Shuraim Al Shammari and Rashidi Emir Saud bin Abdulaziz Al Rashid
- Ali Al-Rashid, Kuwaiti politician
- Hannah Al Rashid, Indonesian actress
- Harun al-Rashid, the fifth Abbasid Caliph, 786–809
- Jomana Alrashid, Saudi media executive
- Abu'l-Futuh al-Hasan ibn Ja'far, briefly anti-Caliph in 1012, claimed the regnal name al-Rashid
- Al-Rashid Billah, the Caliph of Baghdad, from 1135 to 1136
- Mohamed Al-Rashed, Sudanese footballer
- Mohammed Al-Rashid, Saudi Arabian footballer
- Al-Rashid of Morocco (Moulay Al-Rashid ibn Sharif) Sultan of Morocco from 1666 to 1672
- Nasser Ibrahim Al-Rashid, Saudi businessman and billionaire

== Located in Baghdad, Iraq ==
- Al-Rashid, Baghdad, an administrative district
- Al-Rashid Street
- Al-Rasheed Airport
- Al Rasheed Hotel
- Al Rasheed TV, a satellite TV channel based in Baghdad
- Al-Rasheed SC, a defunct Iraqi football club based in Baghdad
- Al Rasheed University College, a private university

== Other uses ==
- Emirate of Al-Rashīd, a pre-Saudi Arabian state in the Nejd region of Arabia, existing from the mid-nineteenth century to 1921
- Rashidi dynasty, a historic dynasty of the Arabian Peninsula
- Al Rashid Trust, charity front of Taliban and Al-Qaeda
- Al-Rashid humanitarian aid incident, a massacre in which 112 Palestinians were killed in Gaza
- Al Rashid, a merchant ship originally named USCGC Dione

== See also ==
- Rashid (disambiguation)
