= Arshad Ali (Pakistani politician) =

Pakistani politician

MPA Arshad Ali

Member of the Khyber Pakhtunkhwa Assembly
- In office 2013–2018
- Constituency: PK-19 (Charsadda-III)

Personal details
- Party: PTI (2019-present)
- Other political affiliations: QWP (2013-2019)
- Occupation: Politician

Arshad Ali (Pashto: ارشد على) is a Pakistani politician from Charsadda District, who is serving as a member of the Khyber Pakhtunkhwa Assembly. He is the brother of former MPA Alam Zeb Khan.

== Political career ==
Ali was elected as the member of the Khyber Pakhtunkhwa Assembly on the Qaumi Watan Party ticket from PK-19 (Charsadda-III) in the 2013 Pakistani general election. He also contested the 2018 General Elections but lost to Shakeel Bashir Khan.
