= Aasha =

Aasha may refer to:

- Aasha (1957 film), a Hindi-language film directed by M. V. Raman
- Aasha (1980 film), a Hindi-language film directed by J. Om Prakash
- Aasha (1982 film), a Malayalam-language film directed by Augustine Prakash
- Aasha (1983 film), an Indian Kannada film directed by A. T. Raghu
- Aasha (2015 film), a Pakistani Urdu film directed by Kashif Nasir
- Aasha (2026 film), an Indian Malayalam language film.
- Aasha (board game), a variant of the ancient Royal Game of Ur
