= Tang-e Goraz =

Tang-e Goraz تنگ گراز
- Village
- Location within Iran
- Coordinates: 33°33′00″N 47°43′43″E
- Country: Iran
- Province: Lorestan
- County: Kuhdasht
- Bakhsh: Central
- Rural District: Kuhdasht-e Jonubi

Population (2006)
  - Total: 364
- Time zone: UTC+3:30 (IRST)
  - Summer (DST): UTC+4:30 (IRDT)

Tang-e Goraz (Persian: تنگ گراز, also Romanized as Tang-e Gorāz; also known as Rashīd) is a village in Kuhdasht-e Jonubi Rural District, in the Central District of Kuhdasht County, Lorestan Province, Iran. At the 2006 census, its population was 364, in 69 families.
