= Alam Zeb Khan =

Pakistani politician

Member of Provincial Assembly of Khyber Pakhtunkhwa
- In office ?–?

Personal details
- Died: 28th October
- Political party: Pakistan Peoples Party (Sherpao) (PPP-S)

Alam Zeb Khan was a Pakistani politician who served as a Member of Provincial Assembly of Khyber Pakhtunkhwa and was affiliated with the Pakistan Peoples Party (Sherpao) (PPP-S).

== Assassination ==
In April 2010, Khan was assassinated in Charsadda, where he was shot dead by unknown gunmen outside the Sui Gas office.

== Awards ==
- Sitara-i-Imtiaz (2009)
