= Rashid bey Afandiyev =

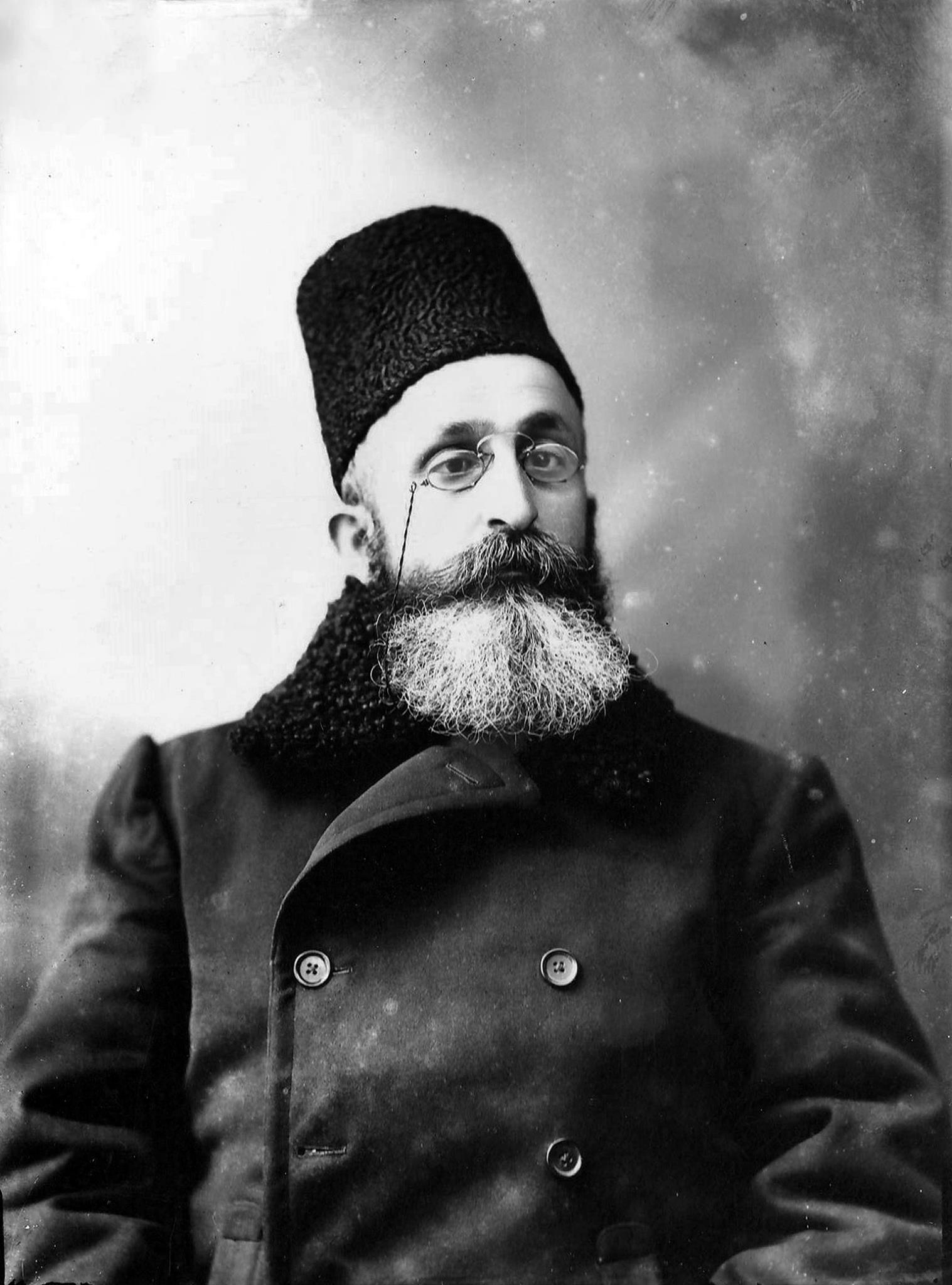
- Native name: Rəşid bəy Əfəndiyev
- Born: Rəşid bəy İsmayıl oğlu Əfəndiyev; 24 May 1863 Shaki, Russian Empire
- Died: 31 August 1942 (aged 79) Shaki, Azerbaijan SSR, Soviet Union
- Occupation: Educator, writer, ethnographer, playwright, translator
- Language: Azerbaijani

Rashid bey Afandiyev (Azerbaijani: Rəşid bəy İsmayıl oğlu Əfəndiyev; 24 May 1863 – 31 August 1942) was an Azerbaijani educator, writer, ethnographer, playwright and translator. He was one of the early Azerbaijani graduates of the Transcaucasian Teachers Seminary and contributed to the development of Azerbaijani textbooks, children's literature, drama and ethnographic studies.

== Early life and education ==
Rashid bey Afandiyev was born in 1863 in Shaki, then also known as Nukha, into a religious family. He received his early education at a mosque school near the Juma Mosque, where he studied under Abdurrazzag Tahirzade. He also studied religious sciences and Eastern languages at home under the guidance of his father.

In 1873, after completing his mosque-school education, he continued his studies in Russian, first at a district school and later at a city school. There he studied subjects including mathematics, history, geography, physics and chemistry, and became familiar with European literature.

Afandiyev entered the Muslim section of the Gori Teachers Seminary in 1878 and graduated in 1882. After graduation, he was assigned to the primary school in the village of Qabala, where he worked for eight years. In 1890, he moved to the village school of Khachmaz, where he worked for two more years.

== Teaching career ==
In 1892, after ten years of teaching in village schools, Afandiyev moved to Tiflis. There he worked as an assistant secretary at the Caucasian Muslim Spiritual Board and as a teacher at the Omar School, which operated under the patronage of the mufti.

In 1900, he graduated from the Alexandrov Teachers Institute in Tiflis and received the right to teach in city schools. The same year, he was appointed teacher of Azerbaijani language and Islamic studies at the Azerbaijani section of the Gori Teachers Seminary. He taught at the seminary for sixteen years, working alongside figures such as Firidun bey Kocharli and A. Mukhtarov. From 1900 to 1917, he taught Azerbaijani at the Gori Seminary.

Archival documents preserved in the Azerbaijan State Historical Archive mention Afandiyev in connection with the Azerbaijani section of the Transcaucasian Teachers Seminary. A protocol dated 22 May 1911 lists him among participants in a commission meeting on practical lessons for students of the Tatar section of the Gori Seminary, alongside Firidun bey Kocharli, Muslim Magomayev and A. Mukhtarov.

Among his students at the seminary were the Azerbaijani composers Uzeyir Hajibeyov and Muslim Magomayev.

In 1916, Afandiyev organized short-term courses for teachers in Erivan, Nakhchivan and Ordubad. In 1916–1917, he was appointed inspector of public schools in the Erivan Governorate. After the February Revolution of 1917, he helped lead the nationalization of schools in the governorate. In 1918, he moved to Baku and took part in educational measures carried out by the Azerbaijan Democratic Republic. By order of the Ministry of Education, he was appointed director of the Baku Men's Seminary and also participated in the work of the alphabet commission under the Ministry of Education.

In 1920, Afandiyev was appointed director of the Pedagogical Institute in Nukha. During the Soviet period, he continued his pedagogical and scholarly activity. He served as director of the pedagogical school in Shaki, scientific secretary of the Shaki branch of the Ethnographic Society, and a research worker at the Azerbaijan Branch of the USSR Academy of Sciences.

From 1926 to 1933, Rashid bey Afandiyev taught Russian.

== Literary and scholarly activity ==
Rashid bey Afandiyev was the author of the textbooks Uşaq bağçası (lit. 'Kindergarten'; 1898) and Bəsirətül-ətfal (lit. 'Children's Insight'; 1901). These textbooks became widely known in education and were reprinted several times. They were used not only in Azerbaijani schools but also in other regions of the Caucasus inhabited by Turkic peoples. According to Azərbaycan müəllimi, Uşaq bağçası was approved by the Caucasus Educational District for use in state and private Azerbaijani-language schools and was published four times in a total of 90,000 copies.

He also wrote the first part of Vətən dili (lit. 'Homeland Language'), which included his Azerbaijani translation of Ivan Krylov's fable The Fox and the Grapes.

Rashid bey worked in children's literature, drama and literary translation. While studying at the Gori Seminary in the 1880s, he became interested in drama and wrote the play Qan ocağı (lit. 'Hearth of Blood'), which was staged at the school. His other dramatic works included Saqqalın kəraməti (lit. 'The Miracle of the Beard'), Qonşu-qonşu olsa, kor qız ərə gedər (lit. 'If the Neighbour Is a Good Neighbour, Even a Blind Girl Will Marry'), Pul dəlisi (lit. 'Money Madman'), Bir saç telin qiyməti (lit. 'The Price of a Strand of Hair'), Tiflis səfirləri (lit. 'The Envoys of Tiflis'), Diş ağrısı (lit. 'Toothache') and Təbiətdə əhvali-məişət (lit. 'Everyday Life in Nature'). Other works attributed to him include Şəki (lit. 'Shaki'), Xəzan və bahar (lit. 'Abscission and Spring'), Qadınların sport dəstəsi (lit. 'Women’s Sports Team') and Qızıl gül (lit. 'Red Rose').

He translated works and excerpts by Russian classical authors, including Alexander Pushkin, Mikhail Lermontov, Ivan Krylov, Nikolai Gogol and Leo Tolstoy, for use in schoolbooks. He also translated the story of Rostam and Sohrab from Ferdowsi and a poem by Friedrich Schiller.

Afandiyev also wrote in the fields of ethnography and literary studies. His ethnographic works included writings on marriage customs in Nukha, the Qabala region and the village of Gutgashen (present-day Gabala). His literary studies included works on Azerbaijani literature, Leo Tolstoy and Seyid Azim Shirvani.

In 1924, he was elected a delegate to the First Local History Congress of Azerbaijan and scientific secretary of the Shaki branch of the Ethnographic Society.

His son Mammad Afandiyev was also an educator.

== Death and legacy ==
Rashid bey Afandiyev died on 31 August 1942 in Shaki. A house museum dedicated to him operates in Shaki. A local history museum, school, library and street in the city also bear his name.

His 100th anniversary was marked in 1964 at an event organized with the participation of the Ministry of Education of the Azerbaijan SSR, the Writers' Union and the Azerbaijan Pedagogical Institute.

== Gallery ==
Works preserved in the National Museum of History of Azerbaijan:

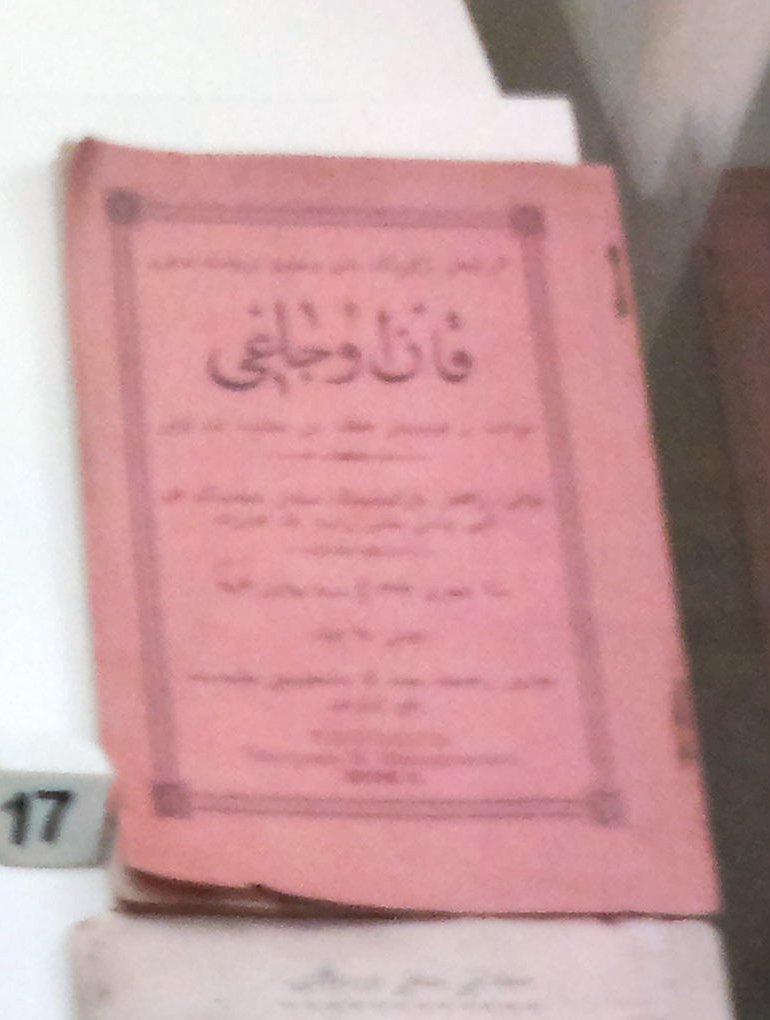
Title page of Afandiyev's book Qan ocağı (lit. 'Hearth of Blood'), Tiflis, 1904

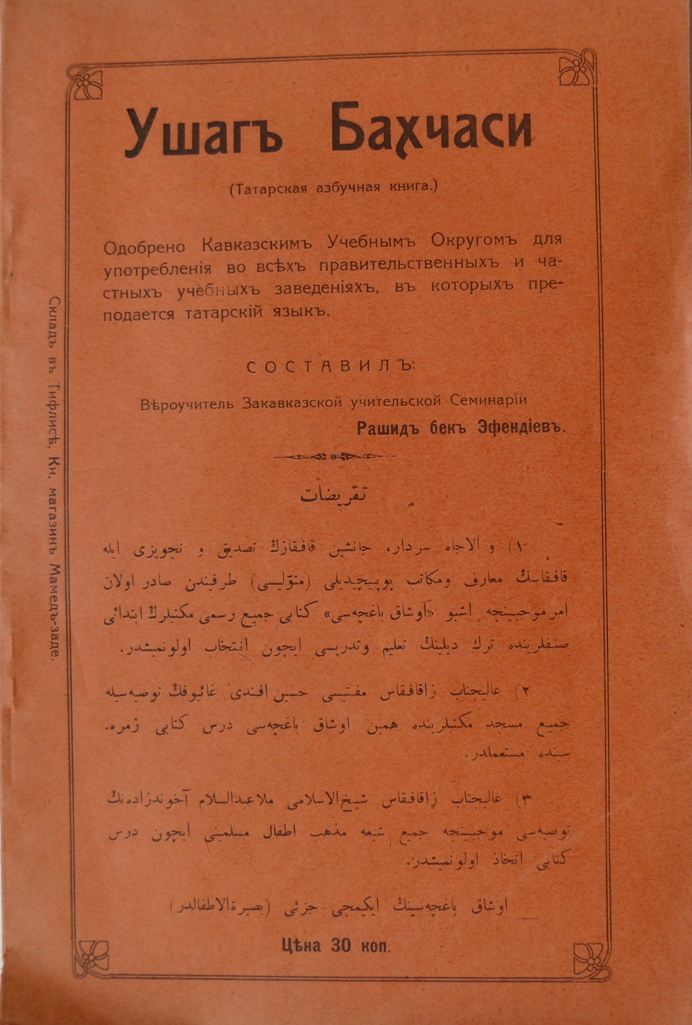
Title page of Afandiyev's primer Uşaq bağçası (lit. 'Kindergarten'), 4th edition, Tiflis, 1912

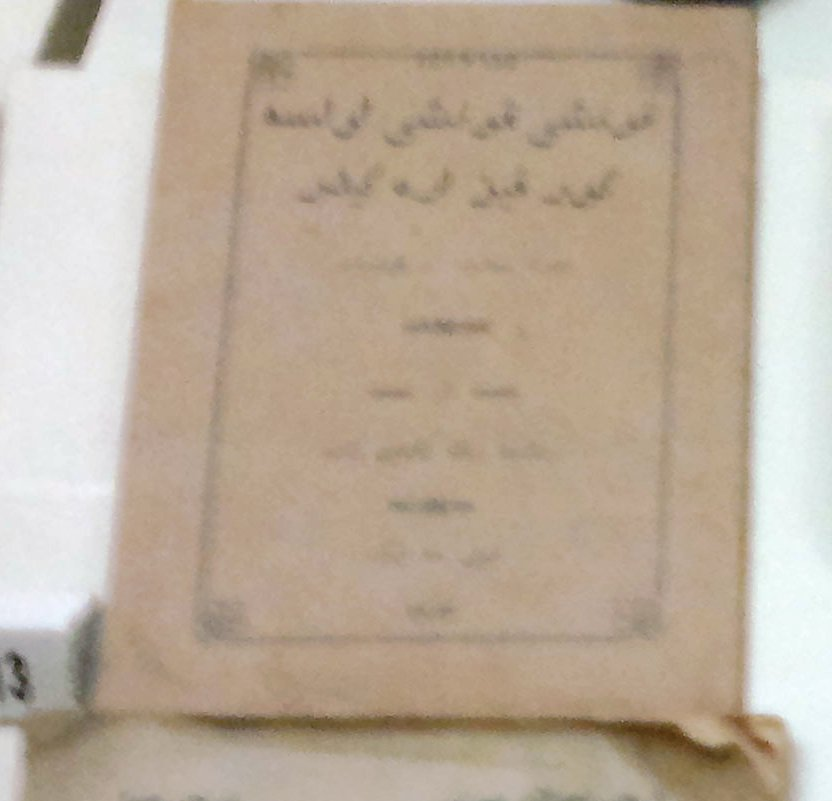
Title page of Afandiyev's play Qonşu-qonşu olsa, kor qız ərə gedər (lit. 'If the Neighbour Is a Good Neighbour, Even a Blind Girl Will Marry'), Baku, 1913

== See also ==
- Nazli Najafova
