= Pride (Rachid song) =

Single by Rachid

from the album Prototype
- Released: 1998
- Genre: R&B
- Length: 5:34
- Label: Universal
- Songwriters: Rachid; Carl Sturken; Evan Rogers
- Producers: Rachid; Carl Sturken; Evan Rogers

Rachid singles chronology
"Pride" (1998)	"Requiem Pour Un Con" (1998)

"Pride" is a song by American R&B singer Rachid, from his debut album, Prototype (1998). The breakup song, which combines elements of R&B and dance music genres, was written by Rachid with Carl Sturken and Evan Rogers. Released as the lead single from Prototype, "Pride" was promoted with a CD single, as well as samplers which the label gave away at a variety of venues. An accompanying music video went into rotation on MTV, MTV2, BET, and MuchMusic. Upon its release, the single was favorably received by critics. It became a top 40 hit on the Billboard Dance Club Songs chart, on which it spent two months.

== Background and composition ==
Rachid, the son of Kool & the Gang member Ronald Bell, began recording demo tapes while attending Sarah Lawrence College, but chose to wait to enter the industry until finishing his education. While in college, he met Carl Sturken and Evan Rogers, a music production duo known as the Rhythm Syndicate. They began writing and recording music together; ultimately, they would co-write and co-produce Rachid's debut album, Prototype (1998). Rachid signed with Universal Music Group, who selected "Pride" to be his debut single and the lead single from Prototype.

An R&B song, "Pride" incorporates elements of electropop, jungle music, and funk. It also drew comparison to Al Green and Seal. The song was written and produced by Rachid, Carl Sturken, and Evan Rogers. Lyrically, "Pride" is a breakup song. It includes the lines "Well/It's over/I'm breaking down now/I gotta clean up this mess/You made inside", which CMJ New Music Monthly critic Michael Paoletta compared to the songwriting of English musician Morrissey.

== Release ==
The song was released in the United States in 1998 as a four-track CD single, including snippets of Prototype tracks "Charade", "Sweet Charity", and "Zöe's World". To further promote the song, Universal announced plans to give out around 1,000 copies of a three-track sampler (consisting of "Pride", as well as Prototype tracks "Charade" and "Prodigalpete") at the February 1998 Black Ski Summit, as well as packaging the single with consumer and trade magazines, and distributing the single for free at fashion shows and at hotels that offered in-room CD players. Universal informed Billboard of further plans to release a vinyl collection of four "Pride" remixes.

In February 1998, the label announced plans to further promote the song by releasing a music video, which they hoped would receive play on BET. The video was added to BET's rotation for the week ending April 19, 1998. It entered MTV2's rotation the week ending May 16, and was added to MTV's rotation for the week ending June 28. Canadian music video network MuchMusic added it to their rotation the week ending July 18. For the week ending July 26, 1998, the video ranked the twenty-third-most played on MTV.

== Reception ==
Professional ratings
Review scores
Source	Rating
AllMusic	3/5 stars

The single received a "new & noteworthy" designation in the February 14, 1998, issue of Billboard. In a single review, Billboard called the song "a revolutionary but wholly accessible concoction" and praised Rachid's "richly soulful yet utterly rock-friendly" vocal performance, predicting that the single would "have a mighty bright future". Paoletta pointed to the song as evidence that Morrissey "could learn a lesson or two from Rachid, who delves into topics uncommon for a soul artist".

Commercially, the single became a top 40 hit on the Billboard Dance Club Songs chart (then named Club Play). In the issue of Billboard dated April 11, 1998, the song was listed as a "Hot Dance Breakout" for the Club Play chart. Four weeks later, in the issue dated May 9, the song debuted on the Club Play chart at number 43, rising into the top 40 the following week. On the chart dated June 6, in its fifth week on the chart, "Pride" rose from 36 to its peak position of 33, which it held the following week as well. The single ultimately spent eight weeks on the chart.

== Track listing ==
US CD single

1. "Pride" - 5:34
2. "Charade" (excerpt) - 1:25
3. "Sweet Charity" (excerpt) - 1:30
4. "Zoe's World" (excerpt) - 1:33

Promotional Remix 12"

1. "Pride" (Dobie's "It's A Thing" Mix) - 6:17
2. "Pride" (Mindswerve's Paradox Mix) - 6:40
3. "Pride" (Mood II Swing's Remix) - 7:20
4. "Pride" (Album Version) - 5:23
5. "Pride" (Acapella) - 5:26

== Credits ==
Adapted from Billboard and single liner notes.

- Michael Brauer — mixing
- Marta Dawson — music
- Rachid — vocals, lyrics, production
- Carl Sturken and Evan Rogers — production, music

== Charts ==
=== Weekly charts ===
Chart (1998)	Peak position
Italy Airplay (Music & Media)	4
US Club Play (Billboard)	33
