= Rashid Shaz =

Indian Islamic scholar (born 1963)

- راشد شاز
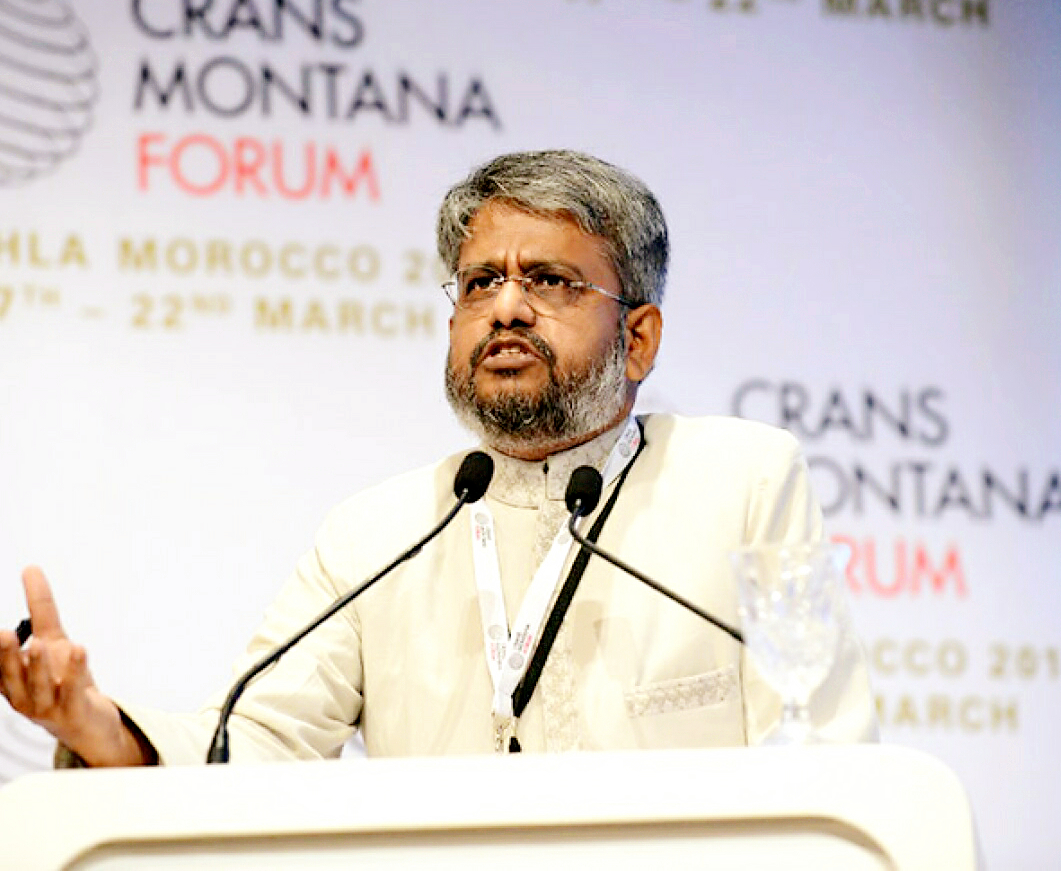
- Dr. Rashid Shaz addressing CRANS MONTANA FORUM ON AFRICA & SOUTH-SOUTH COOPERATION "Toward a better Governance for a sustainable Economic & Social Development" Dated 17 to 22 March 2016 held in Dakhla (Morocco)

Personal life
- Born: 5 February 1963 (age 63) Darbhanga India
- Main interest: Interfaith studies
- Notable idea(s): Building a bridge between Religion and Science.
- Notable work(s): idrak-e-zawaal-e-ummat, Lastam pokh, Islam: negotiating the future, Islam: creating a future Islamic civilization.
- Education: Aligarh Muslim University
- Occupation: Islamic scholar

Religious life
- Religion: Islam
- Denomination: Islam

Rashid Shaz (Urdu: راشد شاز; c. ) is an Indian Islamic scholar at the Aligarh Muslim University, India. His books include: Idrak Zawal-e-Ummat, lastam pokh, kitabul Urooj, and Manifesto of United Islam.

== Brief introduction ==
Rashid Shaz is an ISESCO Ambassador for Dialogue of Culture among Civilizations and a professor of English at the Aligarh Muslim University, India. In 2008, he released in Monaco an important founding document “Calling for a New Dialogue between Islam and Christianity”. Shaz has also engaged with the debate on shibh-ahle-kitab. In his book ادراک اسباب تراجع الامۃ(۲ مجلد) he takes up the issue from the point where Al-Baironi and Shahrastani had left. In 2004, he motivated many enlightened intellectuals in Abrahamic traditions to debate the common issues on futureislam.com.

== Appreciation and activism ==
In 1992, while the Oslo Peace Accord was in the air, he went on a peace mission to London and Washington DC to convey to the policy makers in these capitals about the Muslim sentiments on Jerusalem. In 1994, he launched from New Delhi a weekly newspaper Milli Times International that ceased publishing in the year 2001.

== Activism and Public Engagement ==
Rashid Shaz has engaged in intellectual activism aimed at Muslim renewal primarily through his authorship of reformist texts that critique historical stagnation and advocate a return to Qur'anic fundamentals unencumbered by sectarian traditions. In works such as Islam: Negotiating the Future (published post-9/11), Shaz argues that Muslims must transform crises into opportunities by confronting the "deadening effect" of romanticizing the past and addressing internal divisions that hinder alternative system-building. He posits that internal strife over dominant schools of Islamic thought has been the "root cause of our malaise," urging a unified forward-looking vision grounded in facing "stark realities" of both present and past to learn from errors.

Central to Shaz's renewal strategy is a subversive emphasis on transcending Shi'a-Sunni sectarianism, as elaborated in Kodrā: A Narrative of Shi'a-Sunni Understanding (2018, originally in Urdu). Through a fictional narrative featuring a Bosnian scholar grappling with conflicting traditions from Medina and Qom, Shaz traces Muslim decline to post-Prophetic deviations where human interpretations, myths, and state-sponsored madrasas supplanted the Qur'an's unifying guidance, fostering moral and political frailty. He calls for radical reform by rejecting these "twisted, misleading, and poisonous" legacies—including disputed historical accounts of early caliphs—and adhering solely to the Qur'an analyzed via reason and revelation, envisioning this as essential for umma unity and enlightenment akin to prophetic-era cohesion.

In Islam Another Chance? - A Rashid Shaz Reader (2021), a 700-page compilation spanning topics like women's roles, Palestine, and interfaith dialogue, Shaz extends this activism by challenging Muslims' captivity to centuries of Sunni and Shi'a hermeneutics from imams, jurists, and saints, which he sees as obstructing direct Qur'anic engagement. He promotes reopening the Qur'an to spark intellectual dialogue and revival, preserving fourteen centuries of cultural heritage only if reoriented toward prophetic unity, while critiquing over-reliance on ijma (consensus of predecessors) as a barrier to progress. Shaz frames this as an invitation for ongoing discourse, not final doctrine, positioning renewal as a potential catalyst for broader civilizational advancement beyond Muslims.

Shaz's approach draws from reformist precedents like Syed Ahmed Khan and Muhammad Iqbal, employing narrative dialogues to provoke critical breakthroughs against traditionalist resistance, as seen in responses from scholars like Maulana Zishan Misbahi who favor tolerance over wholesale tradition-rejection. His activism underscores Qur'anic evidence of companions' unity (e.g., Quran 48:29) to dismantle fabricated sectarian narratives, aiming to restore Islam's historical capacity for scientific and contemplative vigor.

== Analysis of Muslim Decline and Revival Strategies ==
Rashid Shaz attributes the decline of Muslim civilizations primarily to an intellectual and interpretive drift from the Quran's core guidance, where human jurisprudence and clerical authority gradually supplanted direct engagement with divine revelation, leading to ceremonial stagnation and loss of transformative vitality. In works like Where is the Crack? Tracing the Faultline of Muslim Decline (published circa 2024), he traces this faultline through historical parallels with communities such as the ancient Jews, arguing that Muslims, like prior nations, experienced divine favor eroded by over-reliance on scholarly traditions that obscured prophetic essence, exacerbated after pivotal losses like the fall of Baghdad in 1258 and Granada in 1492, which prompted sparse self-critical discourse among scholars. Shaz further identifies rigid taqlid (imitation of past rulings) and uncritical adoption of Western paradigms as compounding factors, fostering a fractured communal identity detached from Islam's exploratory spirit. He contends that conflicts in interpreting Islamic history and theology, unresolved since medieval schisms, perpetuated this malaise, turning faith into rote observance rather than dynamic renewal.

For revival, Shaz proposes a rigorous intellectual overhaul centered on audacious ijtihad—independent reasoning grounded in the Quran and authenticated Sunnah—to liberate Muslim thought from centuries of dogmatic inertia. This involves a transformative reassessment of religious understandings, prioritizing the Prophet Muhammad's uswah (exemplary conduct) over layered jurisprudential accretions, to reconstruct a unified ummah capable of addressing modern challenges while reclaiming Islam's innate innovativeness. In Where We Went Wrong? (circa 2024), he advocates bridging historical dogmas with timeless Quranic truths through self-reflective critique, urging Muslims to foster an enlightened identity that revives prophetic mission without emulating external models uncritically. Shaz's strategies emphasize intra-communal dialogue to resolve interpretive conflicts, as explored in Kodra: A Narrative of Shi'a-Sunni Understanding (originally in Urdu, reviewed 2018), positing that such resolution is prerequisite for broader renewal, enabling Muslims to negotiate contemporary realities from first principles of revelation rather than revivalist nostalgia. He warns against superficial political activism, instead prioritizing theological introspection to avert perpetual decline, viewing this Quran-centric pivot as Islam's "another chance" for civilizational resurgence.

== In news ==
Professor Rashid Shaz condemned the silence of Aligarh on lynching incidents. In 2015, Darul Uloom Deoband issued a fatwa declaring Shaz a kafir for alleged deviations from Islamic orthodoxy, a pronouncement he dismissed as inconsequential to his reformist scholarship. This episode underscored the friction between his views and conservative Deobandi authorities.
