= Rashid Seidu =

Ghanaian footballer (born 1995)

Personal information
- Date of birth: 14 September 1995 (age 31)
- Place of birth: Accra, Ghana
- Height: 1.89 m (6 ft 2 in)
- Position: Goalkeeper

Senior career*
Years	Team	Apps	(Gls)
2010–2012	Asante Kotoko	15	(0)
2012–2013	AS Douanes (Niger)	18	(0)
2013–2015	Bechem United	14	(0)
2013–2020	Legon Cities	23	(0)
2020–2021	Inter Allies	24	(0)
2021	Karela United		

International career
2015	Ghana U23	1	(0)
- * Club domestic league appearances and goals as of 30 March 2020

Rashid Seidu (born 14 September 1995) is a Ghanaian professional footballer who plays as a goalkeeper. In 2015, he earned a national call-up and was a member of the Ghana U23 for the 2015 All-Africa Games.

== Club career ==
Seidu signed for professional club Asante Kotoko on 3 January 2011. He joined Nigerien club AS Douanes (Niger) where he secured a year contract with an option of renewal at the end of the season but had a short stint.

He made the move to Bechem United in July 2013, signing a two-year with the Ghanaian Premier League club.

In 2015, Seidu joined Ghanaian Premier league club Wa All Stars now Legon Cities on a four-year deal.

In May 2020, he joined Inter Allies.

== International career ==
In January 2015 he was invited to join the U23 national team for the qualifier games for the All-Africa Games.

== Honours ==
Asante Kotoko

- Ghana Premier League: 2011–12

Bechem United

- Ghana Super Cup runner-up: 2011–12

Wa All Stars

- Ghana Premier League: 2016
- Ghana Super Cup: 2017
