= Rachid Lousteque =

Moroccan football manager

Personal information
- Place of birth: Morocco

Team information
- Current team: Somalia (manager)

Managerial career
- Years: Team
- 2019: Olympique de Khouribga (interim)
- 2022–2023: Somalia

Rachid Lousteque is a Moroccan professional football manager, who was last the head coach of the Somalia national team.

== Managerial career ==
In December 2019, following the sacking of Rachid Taoussi, Lousteque was named as interim manager of Olympique de Khouribga after previously working as an assistant coach under Taoussi. On 5 July 2022, Lousteque was appointed as manager of Somalia.
