= Rashid, Yemen =

Coordinates: 15°07′N 48°19′E

- Interactive map of Rashid, Yemen
- Country: Yemen
- Governorate: Hadhramaut
- Time zone: UTC+3 (Yemen Standard Time)

Rashid, Yemen is a village in eastern Yemen. It is located in the Hadhramaut Governorate.
