= Rashid Asanov =

Russian footballer

Personal information
- Date of birth: 9 January 1970 (age 56)
- Position: Midfielder

Senior career*
Years	Team	Apps	(Gls)
1992	FC Niva Slavyansk-na-Kubani	3	(0)
1992	FC Kuban Krasnodar	1	(0)
1993–1996	FC Niva Slavyansk-na-Kubani	99	(2)
- * Club domestic league appearances and goals

Rashid Asanov (Russian: Рашид Асанов; born 9 January 1970) is a former Russian football player.
