= Rashid Adewumi Aderinoye =

Nigerian academic

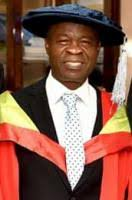

Academic background
- Education: University of Ibadan
- Thesis: Retention and Failure in Distance Education: The Nigeria Teachers Institute experience (1992)

Academic work
- Discipline: Adult education Continuing education
- Institutions: University of Ibadan
- Website: educ.ui.edu.ng/hods-profile-department-adult-education

Rashid Adewumi Aderinoye (born 9 October 1950) from Ifetedo, Osun State, is a Nigerian professor of literacy and open distance learning. He is a former Deputy Executive Secretary, Universal Basic Education Commission (UBEC) and Executive Secretary, National Commission for Nomadic Education (NCNE). He was a former head of the Department of Adult Education, University of Ibadan, Nigeria.

== Early life and education ==
Aderinoye was born in Ifetedo, Osun State, to the family of Pa Sakariyau Aderinoye and Mama Sabitiu Ajimoti Aderinoye. He started his educational journey at Ansar-ur-Deen primary school, Ifetedo and obtained Grade II Teacher Certificate from Ansar-ur-Deen Teacher Training College Ota. Thereafter, he proceeded to the University of Ibadan to study Adult Education and Islamic Studies. He earned a Bachelor of Education (B.Ed.) Degree in 1982, a Master of Education (M.Ed.) Degree in 1984 and Doctoral of Philosophy (Ph.D.) in 1992 from the same institution.

== Career ==
He joined the academic staff of the Department of Adult Education, University of Ibadan on 23 June 1993 as Lecturer II, and became a Professor in 2007. He presented the University of Ibadan Inaugural Lecture on 5 July 2018.

He has served in different capacities outside the university most especially UNESCO programmes on promotion of literacy. He has also served in government in various capacities: he was a member of defunct Oyo State Muslim Pilgrims Welfare Board, 1986–89; Osun State Pilgrims Welfare Board, 1994–1996. He was appointed Deputy Executive Secretary, Universal Basic Education Commission (UBEC) from 2010 to 2013 and Executive Secretary, National Commission for Nomadic Education (NCNE) from 2014 to 2016. Also secretary Ministerial Committee on Madrasah Education 2010–2014.

Aderinoye is an expert in literacy education this is evident in one of the book written in his honour titled "Literacy for sustainable development in a knowledge economy" and a member of the Nigerian Academy of Education.

Professor Rasheed Aderinoye, takes a dignified bow from the premier University of Ibadan on 9 October 2020, upon the attainment of 70 years.

== Selected publications ==
- Aderinoye, R.A. (1997): Literacy Education in Nigeria, Ibadan, Ibadan University Press, 170 pages
- Aderinoye R.A. (2015) Arisekola in our Minds; A Compendium of Tributes. Crafted and Bond Words work 202pg
- Aderinoye R. A. (1990) Cultural preservation and the responsibilities of Adult Instructors in Michael Omolewa, Adeola A.O., Akomolede F.A.O. The Open Door: Teaching them to teach their peers Ibadan IFESH pages 36–432.
- Aderinoye, R. A. (1995) "The National Teachers" Institute Experience in Distance Education in Omolewa Micheal, Adekanmbi Gbolagade eds University Initiatives in Adult Education Ibadan, University Press, pages 127-14
- Aderinoye R.A. (2018) Education: a Vaccine for the Development of Africa, A Keynote Address at International Conference of University of Nairobi College of Education and External Studies Oct 201824.
- Aderinoye R.A. (2018) Adult Education and ICT as tools for promoting democrative ideals: a participatory experience. A Key note Addressat the 2018 National Conference of Nigerian National Council of Adult Education Nov. 2018
- Aderinoye R. A. (1997) Adult Functional Literacy Learner's Manual Ibadan, ARFH
- Omolewa, M.; Fadeyi, T. & Aderinoye, R. A. (2000): "Literacy and NFE: Tools for Empowerment". Journal of ADEA, Commonwealth Secretariat, Swiss Agency for Development and Cooperation, UNESCO, September No. 5. pp. 11–12
- Aderinoye, R. A. (2007), Mass Literacy in Nigeria: Efforts and Challenges in Journal of the Community and Adult Education Society of Nigeria (CARESON) Vol. 5, No 1
- Aderinoye R. A. (2019). Prof, PAI Obanya's Role in Nigerian Education in UMO Ivowi, Educating for Functionality NAE, foremost Educational Services Ltd.52.
- Aderinoye R. A. (2019). Research on Contemporary Issues in Media Resources and Information and Communication Technology Use.A Festschrift in honour of Professor Iyabo Motolagbe Mabawonku. Hubert Charles, Berhe Constantinos, Iyabo Fagbulu, Gesa Kupfer,
- Rashid Aderinoye (2003) Education Sector's Response to HIV/AIDS IN NIGERIA: Report and Framework for Action, Abuja, FME, UNESCO, UNAIDS.
