= Arsha prayoga =

Grammatically incorrect yet valid Sanskrit

Arsha prayoga (Sanskrit: आर्षः प्रयोगः) is a common term for such linguistic usages in Sanskrit, which although not correct as per grammatical rules, are still exempted and deemed valid on account of their having been used by some ancient sages (rishis).
Literally, the word Arsha has the following derivation:

ऋषेरिदम् (अण्) (= That of rishi (usage of Aṇ suffix)).

Its meaning as per Apte's Dictionary is:

Used by a rishi only, relating to or belonging to sages, archaic, Vedic (opp. लौकिक or classical) As per another legend, it is one of the eight forms of marriage where the bride's father receives a pair of kine from the groom.

== Reasons behind deviation from classical grammar ==
There are several reasons why deviations from Classical Sanskrit grammar exist in some ancient works. One reason is, some works were composed in Sanskrit even before Panini's famous work Ashtadhyayi, and so did not and could not bear conformance with this (later) most influential grammar work. Though there were several schools of Grammar before Panini also, of which Panini gives reference in his work.

== Cultural significance ==
In practical terms, the word "Arsha Prayoga" has acquired both formal (approving) as well as humorous (disapproving) senses. In approving sense, it is used to show that the meaning of the word is so important that the speaker's (or writer's) grammatical mistake (or conscious deviation from grammar) does not matter. While in disapproving sense, it is used in Sanskrit and Hindi, in a humorous way, to point out grammatical ignorance of the speaker (or writer).
