= Rashid Nortey =

Ghanaian professional footballer (born 1995)

Rashid Nortey (born 21 November 1995) is a Ghanaian professional footballer who plays as midfielder for Ghana Premier League side Medeama S.C.

== Club career ==
=== Medeama SC ===
Nortey joined the for Tarkwa-based side Medeama SC in 2017 and has been playing for the Mauve and Yellows since Ghana Premier League since 2017 Ghanaian Premier League season. On 26 February 2017, he made his debut in a 3–2 loss to Liberty Professionals, coming on in the 82nd minute for Eric Kwakwa. On 16 July 2017, he played the full 90 minutes in a 3–0 win over Accra Great Olympics. He played 10 league matches that season.

During the 2018 Ghana Premier League season, he featured in all 14 league appearances before the league was abandoned due to the dissolution of the Ghana Football Association (GFA) in June 2018, as a result of the Anas Number 12 Expose. His contract with the club expired at the end of the season.

On 15 March 2020, after being one of the top performers and influential members for the club, he signed a new 3-year contract to keep him at the club until 2023. During the 2019–20 Ghana Premier League season, due a long-term injury he received, he was limited to only 6 league matches out of 15 before the league was cancelled as a result of the COVID-19 pandemic. On 27 November 2020, he was adjudged the man of the match after an impressive performance in a 1–1 draw against Asante Kotoko.

In January 2021, during an interview with Happy FM, he revealed his admiration for Spanish footballer, Liverpool midfielder Thiago Alcantara and hoped he could emulate his style of play.

== International career ==
Nortey received a call up to the Ghana A' national football team ahead of friendly match against Uzbekistan national team.

He made his debut for Ghana national football team on 8 June 2021 in a friendly against Morocco. He substituted Emmanuel Lomotey in the added time of the 0–1 away loss.

== Personal life ==
Nortey has an elder sister called Rashida Nortey, who is known for being a keen supporter and fan always in the stands supporting her brother and Medeama SC. In one instance they expressed their joy and excitement by rushing to each other on either side of the glass barricade, which separates the stands from the pitch, and putting their lips against the glass in a kiss.
