= Arshad Khan (Canadian filmmaker) =

Pakistani-Canadian filmmaker

Arshad Khan (Urdu: ارشد خان) is a Pakistani-Canadian filmmaker, most noted for his 2017 feature documentary Abu.

He studied at the Mel Hoppenheim School of Cinema in Montreal, Quebec, Canada. He has made a number of short films since graduating, including shorts Threadbare (2008), Brownie (2011), Doggoned (2012), Zen (2012) and Valery's Suitcase (2016).

Abu is Khan's long feature directorial debut, in which he tackles his relationship with his family and his own sexual orientation, taking viewers through tense times particularly with his father ("abu" means father in Urdu). The film is also about clash of conservative and liberal values and about modernity versus familiarity and traditions. The film had its world premiere at the Los Angeles Film Festival in 2017.

Khan established "gray matter productions" in partnership with producer Miguel Jimenez. The company creates "cinematic content serving to uplift humanity".

He has also been the director of the Mosaic International South Asian Film Festival.
