= Rashida (disambiguation) =

Rashida is a feminine Arabic given name.

Rashida may also refer to:

- "Rashida" (song)
- Rashida, Libya
- Rashida, Punjab, Pakistan
- DJ Rashida

== See also ==
- Rashid (disambiguation)
- Rasheeda, American songwriter
