= Rashid bey Topchubashov =

Azerbaijani politician (1900–1926)

Rashid bey Topchubashov Rəşid bəy Topçubaşov
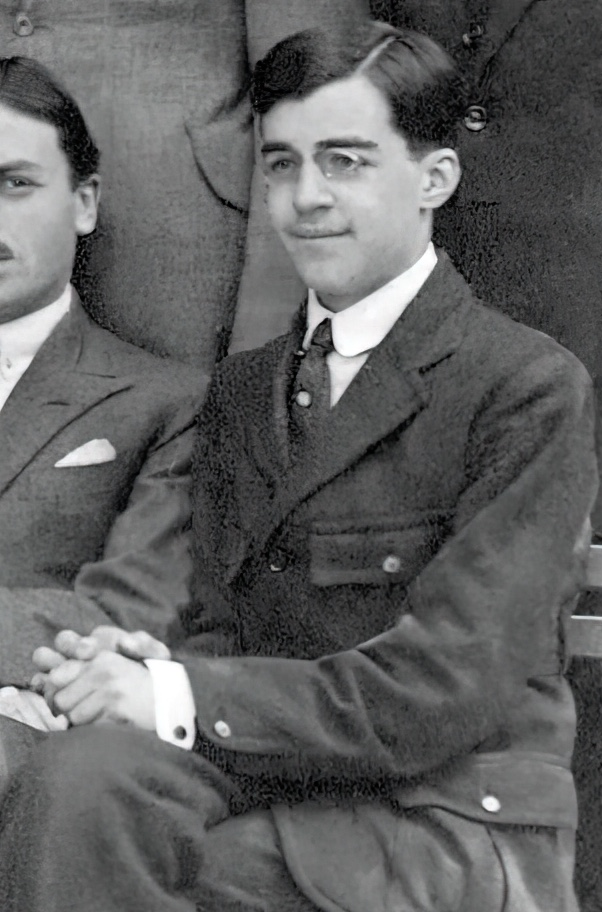

Secretary of the Delegation of the Government of the Azerbaijan Democratic Republic to the Paris Peace Conference
- In office 18 January 1919 – 21 January 1920

Personal details
- Born: 26 October 1901 Tiflis, Tiflis Governorate, Russian Empire
- Died: 17 December 1927 (aged 26) Paris, France

Topchubashov Rashid bey Alimardan bey oglu (October 26, 1901, Tbilisi – December 17, 1927, Paris) — one of the students studied abroad with the state sponsorship, according to a special decision of the Parliament of the Azerbaijan Democratic Republic, secretary of the delegation for the Government of Azerbaijan at the Paris Peace Conference (1919-1920). Son of Alimardan bey Topchubashov.

== Life ==
Topchubashov Rashid Bey Alimardan Bey was born on October 26, 1901, in Tbilisi. He studied at the Baku Real School from September 1910 to April 1918.

In 1919, he was the personal secretary of the chairman of the Azerbaijani delegation sent to the Paris Peace Conference.

In August 1919, his mother Pari khanim Topchubashova wrote a letter to the Ministry of Public Education of the Azerbaijani Democratic Republic to include Rashid Bey in the list of students sent abroad for higher education at the expense of the government. She mentioned in her letter that Rashid Bey was in Paris and entered the pension. He wanted to get higher education in history-philology or technical specialty. After the application was accepted, Rashid Bey was also among the students of the Republic.

After the collapse of the Republic of Azerbaijan, the state stipend was also cut. After Red Army invasion of Azerbaijan, the report of the special representative sent abroad by the Council of People's Commissars in 1921-1922 to investigate the situation of Azerbaijani students studying abroad at the expense of the state showed that Topchubashov successfully continued his education. It was also mentioned here that Rashid Bey Topchubashov refused to accept the scholarship provided by Soviet Azerbaijan despite his poor financial situation.
