= Omar bey Al-Raschid =

German publicist

Omar bey Al-Raschid, also known as Friedrich Arnd, was a German publicist who was born on 3 July 1839. As per author Theodor Lessing he was born in Germany but raised in Russia. However, as per some other sources he was born in St Petersburg, Russia. In 1863 he married his cousin Therese, with whom he had four children. In 1873, he started an extramarital relationship with Helene Böhlau. In 1886 he traveled with Helene to Istanbul, where he accepted Islam and divorced his wife Therese under Islamic law and married Helene. The philosophy of Omar influence Helene's writings after his death. After a year in Istanbul, the couple moved to Munich, where their son Omar Hermann Ottokar was born in 1895. As per author Theodor Lessing the registration information of the author is missing, and all that is known about him is that he was registered as a Turkish Citizen. He died on 26 January 1911 in Munich at age 71.

== Books ==
- Das hohe Ziel der Erkenntnis: Aranada Upanishad at Project Gutenberg
