= Alimardan bey Topchubashov =

Azerbaijani politician

- Əlimərdan bəy Topçubaşov
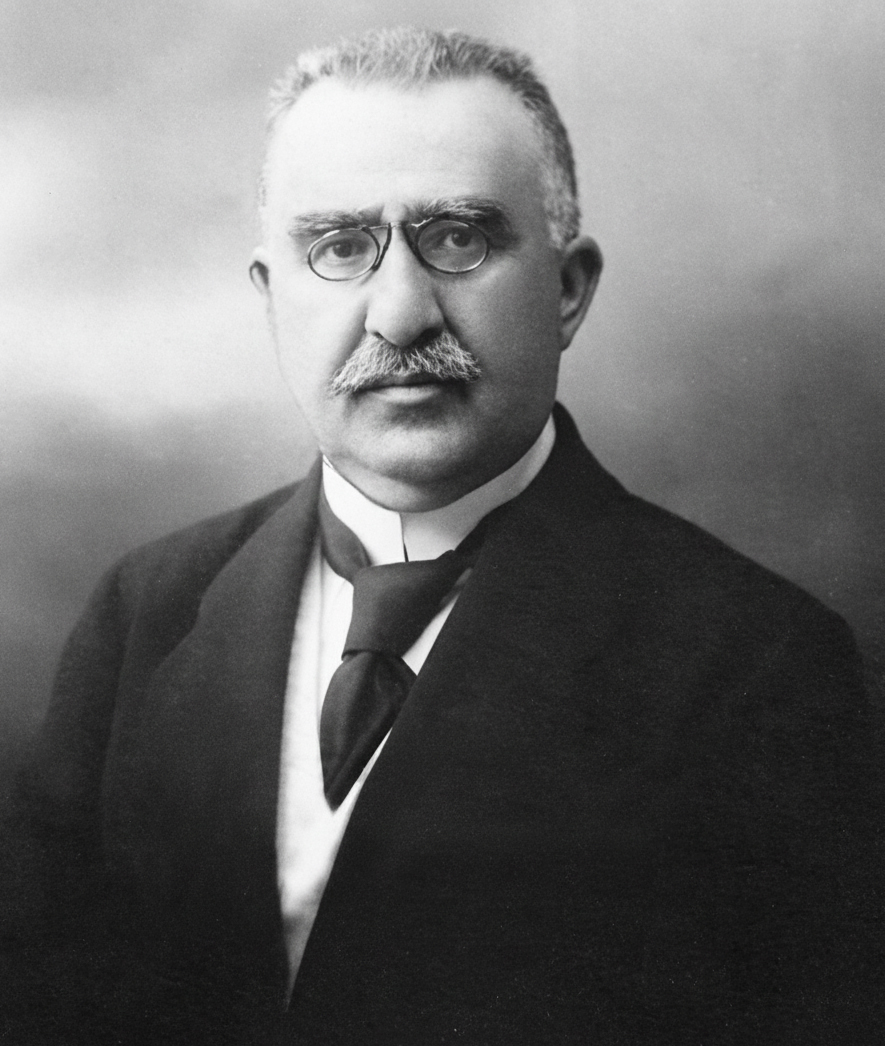
- Topchubashov in 1918

Deputy of the First State Duma
- In office 27 April 1906 – 21 July 1906

Minister of Foreign Affairs of Azerbaijan Democratic Republic (ADR)
- In office 6 October 1918 – 7 December 1918
- Preceded by: Mammad Hasan Hajinski
- Succeeded by: Fatali Khan Khoyski

Deputy Speaker of National Assembly of Azerbaijan Democratic Republic (ADR)
- In office 7 December 1918 – 27 April 1920
- Preceded by: Office created
- Succeeded by: Office eliminated

Personal details
- Born: 4 May 1862 Tiflis, Tiflis Governorate, Russian Empire
- Died: 8 November 1934 (aged 72) Paris, France
- Party: Ittifaq al-Muslimin; Musavat; Independent
- Spouse: Pari Malikova
- Children: Ələkbər bəy Topçubaşov; Rashid bey Topchubashov
- Occupation: Lawyer
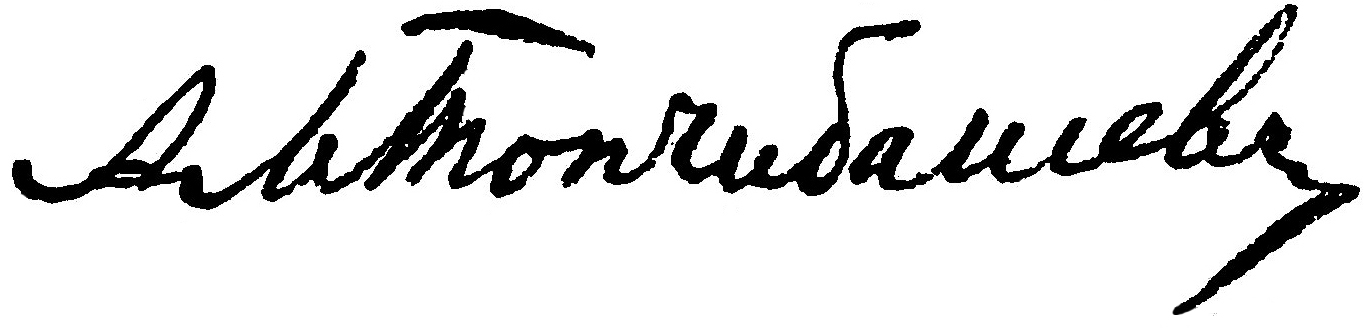
- Signature

Alimardan bey Alakbar bey oghlu Topchubashov (Azerbaijani: علی‌مردان بگ علی‌اکبر بگ اوغلی طوپچیباشیف, Әлимәрдан бәј Әләкбәр бәј оғлу Топчубашов, Əlimərdan bəy Ələkbər bəy oğlu Topçubaşov; 4 May 1862 – 8 November 1934) was a prominent Azerbaijani politician, foreign minister and speaker of the Parliament of Azerbaijan Democratic Republic.

== Biography ==
There are varied assumptions about the birth date of Topchubashov, different authors and journals claim that he was born in 1865, 1862, 1859 and other similar dates. After all these resorts on archive data, it is finally known that he was born in 4 May in 1863 in Tiflis (now Tbilisi). The Topcubashovs family was originally from Ganca city, but they were living at Tbilisi, near the Char Palace. In 1868, he lost his father and later his mother. Therefore, he was raised by his grandmother.

After studying at Tiflis Gymnasium, he entered Saint Petersburg University and graduated from the law faculty in 1888. While studying in Tiflis Gymnasium, Alimardan bey Topchubashov wrote some comic journals and spread them among students. During university years in Petersburg, he actively participated in Muslim students' organizations. In 1887, while he was in his third year, he was expelled from the university for his involvement in secret student organizations. However, due to the intervention of professors, the court's decision was changed to a prison sentence, and he was reinstated to the university. He was offered to remain at University and teach law if he would convert to Christianity, but he refused and returned to Tiflis. He worked there as a clerk, investigator, and judge at the District Court. He married Pari Malikova, daughter of Hasan bey Zardabi, founder of the first Azerbaijani newspaper, Akinchi.

In 1897 oil magnate Zeynalabdin Taghiyev bought Kaspi newspaper and invited Topchubashov to be its editor-in-chief. Starting from that time he was actively involved in politics and quickly became one of the prominent leaders of Azerbaijani and Muslim people of Russian Empire. His main platform was the political equality of all subjects of Russian Crown and the end to discriminations of Turkic and Muslim people. At the brink of the First Russian Revolution Topchubashov was one of the initiators of famous meeting of Azerbaijani intelligentsia and bourgeoisie at Taghiyev's palace on 15 March 1905. As a result of this meeting a petition was addressed to Tsar asking for:

- Implementation of local self-governing and new type of courts (jury) in the entire Caucasus
- Granting of full political rights and freedoms to the Muslim subjects of the Crown
- Distribution of land to the peasants who lack it
- Improvement of factory legislation to include Muslim workers too.

From 1902 to 1905, he was one of the representatives of the Baku City Duma. After the Armenian-Azerbaijani massacres in 1905, the City Duma established the Baku Peace Committee in June. In addition to providing financial assistance to those affected by the clashes, the committee's duties included making calls for interethnic peace through local and nationwide Russian press and investigating the nature of the incidents. Topchubashov participated in the committee's work.

Under the occupation of the Russian Empire, all Russian Muslims united in an attempt to defend their interests and freedom. In this process, the first All-Russian Muslim Congress was held although official permission couldn't be obtained on 28 August 1905. The focus was on establishing a Union (Ittifaq) to safeguard political and social rights of the Muslims. Topchubashov also participated in this congress. Despite the dominance of Tatars at the Congress, Azerbaijani Turks supported the common goals and concerns, which included advocating for the political unity of all Russian Muslims, ensuring equal representation of Muslims alongside Russians, upholding the rule of law, establishing freely elected representatives, creating educational institutions, and promoting the publication of books and periodicals. An excerpt from the speech of Alimardan bey Topchubashov clearly reflects the atmosphere of the congress:

'We the Turkish sons have the same origin, same ancestry, and same language. From the West to the East, it used to be our ancestors' lands. In spite of the fact that our ancestors were such a heroic nation, today, in the mountains of Caucasia, in the gardens of the Crimea, in the steppes of Kazan, in the lands of our ancestors, in our homeland we did not have the freedom to speak our own needs. Thank God.. we succeeded (in that) today'.

From January 13 to 23, 1906, the second meeting was held, and Topchubashov presided over it. During the meeting, the regulations of the Union of the Muslims of Russia (Ittifaq al-Muslimin) were adopted. At the same time, Topchubashov was one of the founders of Ittifaq al-Muslimin (first political party of Russian Muslims) and organized its three conferences. The discussion focused on the issue of Muslim representation in the Russian State Duma and advisory council.

The 1905 Revolution in Russia had compelled the country to move towards a parliamentary system of governance. Decisions made on February 18 allowed nations to have their own elected representatives participate in the formation and discussion of laws in the government. Consequently, the Muslim Union, established under the name of the Muslim Fraction, participated in the First State Duma, which opened on April 27, 1906. The fraction was led by Alimerdan Bey Topchubashov. After discussions that led to no conclusions, the Tsar dissolved the Duma, which was met with strong disapproval by the deputies. In response, 180 delegates, including Topchubashov, issued a protest manifesto in the city of Vyborg. Many of these delegates were arrested and banned from participating in the next Duma. Topchubashov was arrested for three months, lost his right to be ever a parliament member, deprived of his place at Baku Municipality and Kaspi newspaper.

During this time Iran invited him to head one of the departments of the Iranian Ministry of Justice and reform its judiciary system, but Topchubashov rejected this offer and remained in Russian Empire to continue his struggle for the emancipation of the Muslim population.

After the February Revolution of 1917, there was an increase in social and political activity among the populations in the regions formerly part of Imperial Russia. An event during this period was the Caucasus Muslims Congress, which occurred in Baku from April 15 to 20, 1917. Topchubashov served as the chair of the congress. In his opening address, he remarked:

"Today's congress of the Caucasus Muslims is the first national congress in the past hundred years where the free voice of the Caucasus Muslims will be heard. This congress must restore the former historical grandeur of the Caucasus."

After the Azerbaijan Democratic Republic was proclaimed on 28 May 1918, Topchubashov became its ambassador to Armenia, Georgia and the Ottoman Empire, and was sent to Istanbul. Then he was made minister of foreign affairs at the second cabinet and was elected the head of the Parliament in absentia on 7 December 1918, thus becoming second head of state of Azerbaijan Democratic Republic, after Mammed Amin Rasulzade. Agreeing to head the Azerbaijani Delegation at Versailles Conference, he left Istanbul for Paris.

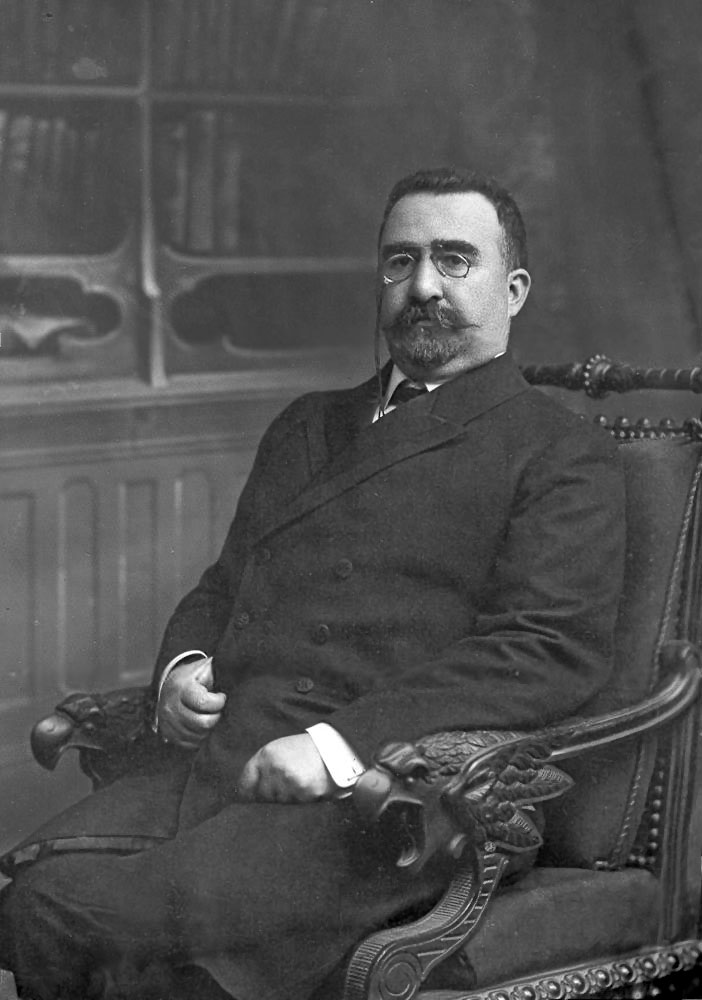
Topchubashov in 1906

At the conference, he managed to meet US President Woodrow Wilson and achieved the de facto recognition of the Azerbaijan Democratic Republic in January 1920. But after the Bolshevik takeover of ADR he could not return and stayed in Paris, where he died on 8 November 1934. He is buried in the communal cemetery of Saint-Cloud (near Paris), with his wife, Peri Topchubashova, who died in 1947, and two other people who bear his name. Topchubashov never gave up his job even when he was in France. He published books, brochures, and journals in an attempt to introduce and represent Azerbaijan to foreigners.

== Memoralisation ==
The Baku-based Topchubashov Center think tank is named after him

== Works ==
Azərbaycanın təşkili (The establishment of Azerbaijan). (1918) in Istanbul
