= Rashid Muslih =

Rashid Muslih (died 1970) was an Iraqi official who served as the Interior Minister. He was executed in 1970 after publicly acknowledging his espionage activities on behalf of the Central Intelligence Agency (CIA). However, author Con Coughlin suggests it was the result of a show trial.
