= Bagrat Khutaba =

Abkhazian politician (born 1982)

Personal information
- Born: 10 February 1982 (age 44)
- Height: 187 cm (6 ft 2 in)
- Weight: 115 kg (254 lb)

Sport
- Sport: Freestyle wrestling
- Club: CSKA Moscow
- Coached by: Rashid Khutaba (father)

Bagrat Khutaba (Russian: Баграт Хутаба; born 10 February 1982) is the Ambassador Extraordinary and Plenipotentiary of the Republic of Abkhazia to the Syrian Arab Republic and a retired freestyle wrestler and the current Chairman of the State Committee for Physical Culture and Sports of Abkhazia. Khutaba was appointed on 11 April 2015 by President Raul Khajimba — up until that point, Sports had been part of the Ministry for Education.

Bagrat is the son of Rashid Khutaba, a heavyweight freestyle wrestler who won the European title in 1982. Coached by his father, Bagrat won a bronze medal at the 2001 Junior World Championships. At the time he studied and trained in Moscow and competed for Russia. His younger brother Badzhgur is also an international heavyweight freestyle wrestler.
