= Rashid Seif Suleiman =

Tanzanian politician

Rashid Seif Suleiman (born 1954), is a member of the Zanzibar House of Representatives and minister of communication and infrastructure in the Revolutionary Government of Zanzibar Tanzania.

Mr Rashid completed his primary education at Ngambwa in the Chake-Chake district of Pemba, and attended Shamiani Secondary School. He graduated from Fidel Castro Secondary. He enrolled at Lumumba High School for his high school education. In 1977, he enrolled at the University of Dar Es Salaam, where he obtained a BSc (hons) in chemistry. In 1983, he enrolled at Leeds University for postgraduate studies in educational administration.

He started working at the Ministry of Education as a high school chemistry teacher at Fidel Castro Secondary School. He was later appointed as a secondary school inspector at Pemba.
