= Fatawu Sulemana =

Ghanaian professional footballer (born 2003)

Fatawu Sulemana (born 14 December 2003) is a Ghanaian professional footballer who plays as defender for Ghana Premier League side Al-Merrikh SC

== Club career ==
=== Early career ===
Sulemana played for lower-tier side Miracle Land FC before moving to Medeama SC.

=== Medeama SC ===
Sulemana was signed by Tarkwa-based side Medeama SC in 2019. In January 2020, when Ali Ouattara and Philip Osei received injuries, Samuel Boadu was forced to name him and Rashid Alhassan in his 18-man squad for a match against Dreams FC on 19 January 2020. He was given the chance to make his debut in that match coming on in the 74th minute for captain Joseph Tetteh Zutah, the match ended in a 1–0 loss to Medeama. On 11 March 2020, he made his full debut playing the full 90 minutes in a 2–0 victory against Techiman Eleven Wonders. During the 2019–20 Ghana Premier League season, he played in 2 league matches before the league was cancelled as a result of the COVID-19 pandemic.

== International career ==
Sulemana received call-ups to the Ghana national under-20 football team in 2019 and 2020 ahead of the 2021 Africa U-20 Cup of Nations.
