= Ibrahim Sulemana =

Ibrahim Sulemana may refer to:

- Ibrahim Sulemana (footballer, born 1987), Ghanaian football striker
- Ibrahim Sulemana (footballer, born 2003), Ghanaian football defensive midfielder for Atalanta BC
