= Rashid Khutaba =

Soviet wrestler

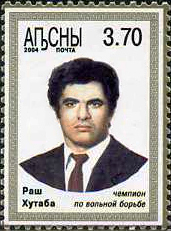
- Khutaba on a 2005 stamp of Abkhazia

Personal information
- Born: 10 February 1951 (age 75) Sukhumi, Abkhazia

Sport
- Sport: Freestyle wrestling
- Club: Dynamo Sukhumi, CSKA Moscow
Medal record
Representing the Soviet Union
European Championships
| Gold medal – first place | 1982 Varna | -100 kg |

Rashid "Rash" Khabugovich Khutaba (Russian: Раш Хабугович Хутаба; born 10 February 1951) is a retired freestyle wrestler from Abkhazia. Competing in the 100 kg division he won the Soviet national title in 1981 and the European title in 1982. After retiring from competitions he coached his sons Bagrat and Badzhgur, who also became international heavyweight freestyle wrestlers, and headed the Greco-Roman and freestyle wrestling federations of Abkhazia. An international wrestling tournament is held annually in Gudauta in his honor.
