= Men's Gymnasium Building (Baku) =

Building in Baku, Azerbaijan

- Azerbaijani: Kişi gimnaziyasının binası Russian: Здание мужского спортивного зала
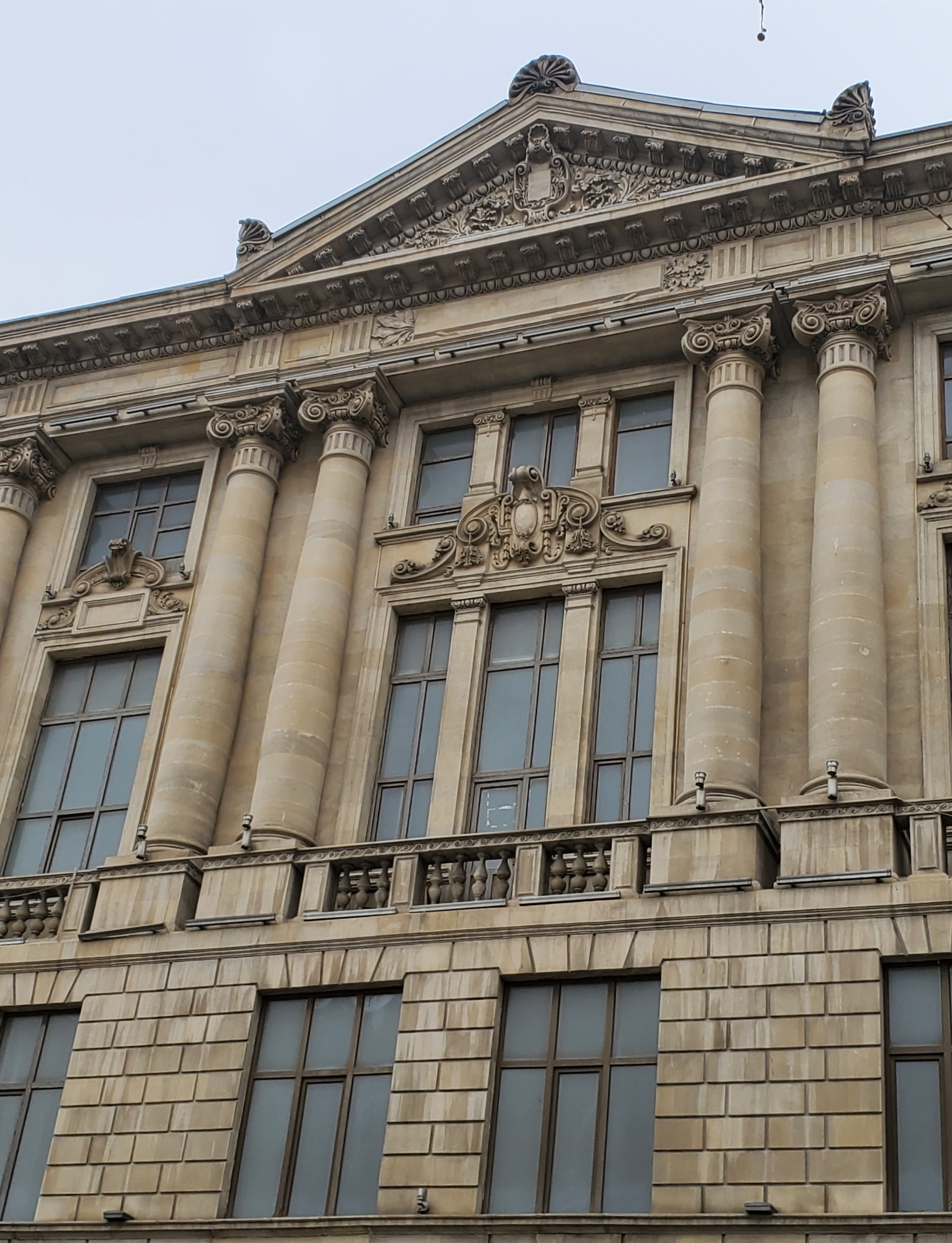
- Interactive map of the Men's Gymnasium Building area

General information
- Location: Fuzuli Street 61, Baku, Azerbaijan
- Coordinates: 40°22′41″N 49°50′25″E
- Completed: 1911—1913

Design and construction
- Architect: Konstantin Borisoglebskiy

Men's Gymnasium Building was built in 1911–1913 in Baku, Azerbaijan for the Men's Gymnasium named after Emperor Alexander III. The architect of the building was Konstantin Borisoglebsky. The building was once the second largest educational institution after the Baku Real School. After the Soviet occupation, the building functioned as the city hospital No. 4. In 2018, the building was removed from the control of the Ministry of Health due to the relocation of City Hospital No. 4. It is currently unused.

== About ==
The building, located at the intersection of 61 Balakhanskaya (now Fuzuli) Street and 40 Krasnovodskaya (S. Vurgun) Street, was built for the Men's Gymnasium. The building was designed in 1911–1913 by civil engineer Konstantin Borisoglebsky. Together with the details of the facade, it occupies an active urban position with its majestic volume, classical forms in the order system and architectural composition. The protruding central part of the main façade is specially marked with a magnificent portico along the two upper floors of the Ionic order. The three-quarter columns with very clearly drawn profiles on the background of the lower floor, carved in unshaven stone, and the classic-style arch, show the author's desire for opulence and luxury. The gymnasium for men is one of the few examples of pre-Soviet occupation educational constructions and it is an architectural monument in Baku.

== See also ==
- Ismailiyya Palace
- Mitrofanov Residence
- Property of Haji Mustafa Rasulov
