= Rachid (singer) =

American singer-songwriter and music producer

- Also known as: Rasalus, Râ
- Born: Rasheed A. Bell; 1973 or 1974 (age 52–53); New Jersey, U.S.
- Genres: Downtempo; R&B; electropop; soul
- Occupations: Singer; songwriter; music producer
- Instruments: Vocals; piano
- Years active: 1997–present
- Label: Universal

Rasheed A. Bell (born in 1973 or 1974), better known by his stage name Rachid, is an American singer-songwriter and music producer. He is the son of founding Kool & the Gang member Ronald Bell. He achieved a top 40 hit on the Dance Club Songs chart with his debut single, "Pride" (1998).

== Early life and education ==
Rachid is one of ten children of Ronald Bell, who was a co-founding member of R&B/funk band Kool & the Gang. Raised in Hillside, New Jersey, Rachid graduated from Sarah Lawrence College in 1996.

== Career ==
Rachid signed with Universal Records in 1995. On June 16, 1998, Rachid released his debut solo album Prototype on Universal Records. It was noted for its mix of a range of musical genres, along with thoughtful lyrics. His singing was compared to Prince. The album's lead single "Pride", released in February 1998, peaked at number 33 on Billboard magazine's US Dance Club Songs chart and number 89 on the UK Singles Chart. The album release also included a French-language single, "Requiem Pour Un Con" (Requiem for a Fool), a song written by Serge Gainsbourg. He performed in New York City and London to promote the album.

In early 2007, Rachid changed his stage name to Rasalus, a name he credited to abandoning his Islamic religion. Rasalus released an extended play titled My Name is Rasalus, exclusively in Germany. From 2013 to 2019, he performed the under the stage name "Râ" and released a series of singles: "Whatever It Takes" (2018), "Fade Away" (2019), and "Too Late" (2019). In 2023, he returned to using his stage name Rachid.

== Discography ==
=== Albums ===
Title	Album details
Prototype	Released: June 16, 1998; Label: Universal Records; Formats: CD, cassette
My Name is Rasalus	Released: February 7, 2007; Label: Kawo Music; Formats: CD

=== Singles ===
Title	Year	Peak chart positions				Album
Title	Year	US Dance	UK	UK R&B	UK Dance	Album
"Pride"	1998	33	89	31	26	Prototype
"Requiem Pour Un Con"	1998	—	—	—	—	Prototype
"Charade"	1998	—	—	—	—	Prototype
"Zoe's World"	1999	—	—	—	—	Prototype
"Whatever It Takes"	2018	—	—	—	—	Non-album single
"Fade Away"	2019	—	—	—	—	Non-album single
"Too Late"	2019	—	—	—	—	Non-album single

== See also ==
- 1990s in music
