= Muhammad Arshad Misbahi =

Imam of Manchester Central Mosque Victoria Park (1997–2015)

Hadrat Mufti Muhammad Arshad Misbahi
- Title: Imam Arshad Misbahi

Personal life
- Born: 1968 (age 57–58) Uttar Pradesh, India
- Region: Britain
- Main interest(s): Dars, Taqreer, Islamic Preaching
- Occupation: Imam at Anwar ul Haramayn Jami Mosque, Manchester

Religious life
- Religion: Islam
- Denomination: Sunni
- Jurisprudence: Hanafi
- Tariqa: Qadiriyya
- Movement: Barelvi

Muslim leader
- Disciple of: Shaykh Sayyid Madani Miyan Ashrafi; Muhammad Karam Shah al-Azhari
- Influenced by: Ahmed Raza Khan Barelvi
- Influenced: Lacs of Britishers

Muhammad Arshad Misbahi, or Allama Maulana Hafiz Imam Muhammad Arshad al-Misbahi (born 1968) is the Chair of Al-Karam Scholars Association and has served at Manchester Central Mosque from 1997 to 2015 as the Khatib, Imam and Headteacher. He is a graduate from the Islamic Seminary Al Jamiatul Ashrafia. He is considered by many to be among the knowledgeable scholars of his time.

== Biography ==
Muhammad Arshad Misbahi comes from the family of Sufi Barelvi Muslim in India. His father, Shaykh Hafiz Muhammad Miyan Maleg, has been serving Islam for the last three decades in Birmingham and was the former Imam and Khateeb at Oldbury Jamia Masjid in Birmingham. Imam Muhammad Arshad began his studies at Jamia Al-Karam where he studied under Shaykh Muhammad Imdad Hussain Pirzada and Abu’l-In’am ‘Allama ‘Abd Al-Bari. Later he travelled to India and Pakistan to pursue further and higher education. In Pakistan, he studied with the late Diya’ al-Ummat, Justice Shaykh Muhammad Karam Shah al-Azhari and in India, he studied at Al Jamiatul Ashrafia at Mubarakpur. Upon his return from Pakistan, he began teaching and serving as head of religious studies at Jamia Al-Karam. He completed Tahfeez-ul-Qur’an in Bradford.

He is the founder and patron of the Sunni Society at the University of Nottingham. He has extensively traveled to many countries delivering lectures and seminars. In 2001, he was awarded the ad-Dir’ul ur-Mumtaz award from the Al-Azhar University of Cairo, Egypt.

Describing the anti-Islam movie, he said that (movie) is "against Islam, against the messenger of Islam, and against the teachings of Islam" and he said "I have four children. My parents are both alive. But I am here to say I love my prophet more than I love my children. I love my prophet more than I love my own self."

He was among the signatories of a letter written to British PM to support the refugee's arrival in the U.K. As people of faith, we call on your government urgently to revise its policy towards refugees. The best of this country is represented by the generosity, kindness, solidarity and decency that Britain has at many times shown those fleeing persecution, even at times of far greater deprivation and difficulty than the present day., the letter said.

== Works ==
- Alam, Arshad (March 1, 2008) The Enemy Within: Madrasa and Muslim Identity in North India (Cambridge University Press)
