= Eric Kwakwa =

Ghanaian professional footballer (born 1994)

Eric Kwakwa (born 21 November 1994) is a Ghanaian professional footballer who plays as midfielder for Ghana Premier League side Medeama S.C.

== Club career ==
=== Medeama SC ===
Kwakwa played for Tarkwa-based side Medeama SC from 2014 to 2018. He played in the Ghana Premier League and remained as a key member of the club within that period. His stand out performance was from 2015 to 2016. He helped the club to the win the Ghanaian FA Cup in 2015, the second time in the club's history. During the final match on 30 August 2015, he played the full 90 minutes to help them to a 2–1 victory over Asante Kotoko. He was adjudged man of the match for his performance during the finals. During the 2016 Ghana Premier League season he featured in 25 league matches out of 30, playing a key role in pushing the club to a 4th-place position on the league table.

=== Víkingur Ólafsvík ===
In April 2017, Icelandic-side Víkingur Ólafsvík signed Kwakwa on a season 1-year loan deal from Medeama SC, after successfully passing his medicals. He started training with the Ólafsvík-based side ahead their first match of the season against Valur on 30 April 2017. 2017 Úrvalsdeild. He made his debut on 21 May 2017, playing 73 minutes of a 3–0 loss to ÍBV. At the end of the 2017 Úrvalsdeild season, he featured in 10 league matches, starting in 8 during his time with the club.

=== Return to Medeama SC ===
During the 2018 Ghana Premier League season, he returned to play for Medeama SC. He made 10 league appearances and scored 1 goal before the league was abandoned due to the dissolution of the Ghana Football Association (GFA) in June 2018, as a result of the Anas Number 12 Expose. His contract with the club expired at the end of the season.

In October 2019, he re-joined the side on a two-year deal as a free agent ahead of the 2019–20 Ghana Premier League season. He was hailed by then coach, Samuel Boadu as being one of the most exciting midfielders in Ghana. He played in 6 league matches out of 15 before the league was cancelled as a result of the COVID-19 pandemic.

== Honours ==
=== Club ===
Medeama SC

- Ghanaian FA Cup: 2015
- Ghana Super Cup: 2016
