= Rashid Alhassan =

Ghanaian professional footballer

Personal information
- Date of birth: 2 September 1998 (age 28)
- Place of birth: Accra, Ghana
- Height: 1.83 m (6 ft 0 in)
- Position: Centre-back

Team information
- Current team: Trepça
- Number: 14

Senior career*
Years	Team	Apps	(Gls)
2017–2019	Wa All Stars	5	(0)
2019	Elman		
2019–2022	Medeama	15	(0)
2022	→ Real Tamale United (loan)	16	(2)
2022–2023	Venda		
2024	Karela United	16	(1)
2024–2025	Kano Pillars	19	(2)
2025–	Trepça		
- * Club domestic league appearances and goals

Rashid Alhassan (born 2 September 1998) is a Ghanaian professional footballer who plays as a centre-back for Kosovo First League club Trepça. He previously played for Wa All Stars, Elman, Medeama, Real Tamale United, Venda, Karela United and Kano Pillars.

== Club career ==
=== Wa All Stars ===
Alhassan started his career with Wa All Stars (now Legon Cities). He was a member of the Wa All Stars squad that won the 2016 Ghana Premier League under the tutelage of former coach Enos Kwame Adepah.

=== Elman FC ===
On 18 January 2019, Alhassan along with fellow Wa All Stars compatriot Razak Toufic were unveiled by Somali Premier League side Elman SC after signing contracts with the club. The duo were reunited with former Wa All Stars coach Abubakari Mumuni Sokpari ahead of the 2019 Somali First Division season. Rashid later moved on loan to Mogadishu City Club in July 2019, prior to the start of the 2019–20 CAF Confederation Cup campaign. He later returned Elman FC before his contract expired in September 2019.

In September 2019, he was reportedly linked with Ghana Premier League side Karela United after the expiration of his contract.

=== Medeama SC ===
In November 2019, ahead of the 2019–20 Ghana Premier League season Alhassan signed for Medeama SC on a free transfer. He signed a 3-year deal with the club. On 29 December 2020, he was a used substitute in the first of the match of the season against Ebusua Dwarfs which ended in a 3–1 victory for Medeama. He made his debut on 16 February 2020, playing the full 90 minutes in a 2–1 loss to Elmina Sharks. He went on and made 6 league appearances before the league was put on hold and latter cancelled as a result of the COVID-19 pandemic.

== Honours ==
Wa All Stars

- Ghana Premier League: 2016
