= The European Conservative =

Hungarian conservative monthly magazine

- Type: Quarterly journal
- Format: Print, Digital
- Owner: European Conservative Nonprofit Ltd.
- Founder: Center for European Renewal
- Publisher: European Conservative Nonprofit Ltd.
- Editor: Alvino-Mario Fantini
- Deputy editor: Ellen Kryger Fantini
- Founded: 2008
- Ceased publication: 2026
- Political alignment: Conservative; Right-wing
- Language: English
- Headquarters: Budapest, Vienna, Brussels
- City: Budapest
- Country: Hungary
- Circulation: 5,000 (print); 120,000 (digital)
- ISSN: 2590-2008
- Website: europeanconservative.com

The European Conservative was a pan-European English-language publication registered in Budapest, Hungary, with an editorial office in Vienna, Austria, and news offices in Brussels, Belgium. It publishes articles, essays, interviews, and reviews about different kinds of conservative, traditionalist, reactionary, and right-wing thought in Europe and across the world.

It initially began in 2008 as an informal, four-page newsletter written and edited by a small group of volunteers associated with the Center for European Renewal, which organizes the annual Vanenburg Society meetings, held in various locations around Europe. It paused publication in 2010, starting again in 2012, edited by a one-person team. In 2021, it received a grant from a private foundation, for which a non-profit entity had to be formed in Budapest, and as part of this arrangement, was also required to work with a team selected by Mathias Corvinus Collegium, an entity linked to the Fidesz party. A few year later, funding from this latter entity began and the foundation's involvement ended.

After the 2026 Hungarian elections and Fidesz government losing control, the journal had shut down with its website no longer being accessible.

== History ==
=== Background and origins ===
The European Conservative originally began in 2008 as an informal, four-page newsletter written and edited by a group of volunteers associated with the Center for European Renewal (CER), a pan-European conservative organization originally based in The Hague, now in Amsterdam.

The CER was formally founded in 2007, after a first exploratory meeting in 2006 held at Kasteel De Vanenburg in Putten, which brought together conservative scholars and writers from across Europe and the United States as well. The CER now organizes an annual Vanenburg Meeting, named after the location of that first 2006 meeting.

Among the founders of the CER are the German publisher and writer Caspar Freiherr von Schrenck-Notzing (1927–2009), the Polish historian and philosopher Miłowit Kuniński (1946–2018), and the British political philosopher Roger Scruton (1944–2020). Other key figures involved with the CER are Dutch ethicist and political philosopher Andreas Kinneging of Leiden University, political scientist András Lánczi, the former rector of Corvinus University in Budapest, and R. R. Reno, editor of First Things magazine.

=== Development and growth ===
Five editions of The European Conservative were published intermittently over a two-year period by a group of volunteers associated with the CER and the Vanenburg Meeting. These included Swedish intellectual and writer Jakob E:son Söderbaum, former head of office (Kabinettschef) for Austrian Chancellors Sebastian Kurz and Alexander Schallenberg, Bernhard Adamec, led by the expat American Oxford scholar, Dr. Jonathan Price. Production of the newsletter was then paused at the end of 2010.

In 2012, former speechwriter, financial journalist, and editor (and co-founder of the CER) Alvino-Mario Fantini volunteered to take over as editor, and working with a group of remote volunteers, produced the sixth issue of the newsletter. With every subsequent issue, the publication was slowly re-designed, and new content and features were slowly added (e.g., a proper cover image, short or mini book reviews, advertisements). The page count was also increased from a few pages to 60 (and eventually to 132). In the early years, distribution of the publication continued in limited print runs and often distributed at events or by hand and post. But it was also made available and distributed as a free .pdf publication, by email and through online links at on of several websites it had over the years.

Since 2021, The European Conservative has been an independent quarterly published by the European Conservative Nonprofit Ltd., a nonprofit organization registered in Hungary. Over the years, it began various forms of collaborative partnerships with the conservative Italian think-tank Nazione Futura in Rome, the academic research institution, the Bibliothek des Konservatismus in Berlin, the Catholic organization Dignitatis Humanae Institute in Rome, the independent research organization CEDI/EDIC in Vienna, the academic entity CEFAS-CEU in Madrid, the Vaçlav Klaus Institute in Prague, and the Institut Iliade in Paris.

As part of its re-launch in 2021, it received funding from a foundation linked to Hungary's then-ruling Fidesz party, which was considered by some observers to be part of a broader attempt to create a right-wing media ecosystem in Hungary and across Europe that was more aligned with conservatism and Orbanism. A 2021 agreement first registered the publication in central Budapest, and later, at the new headquarters of the Mathias Corvinus Collegium, where it —- as well the Brussels Signal media platform, owned by Patrick Egan, an American close to the Fidesz Party and publisher of Remix, another media platform —- shared an address, although they were direct competitors in the eyes of some observers.

The publication's current Editor-in-Chief is Alvino-Mario Fantini, who has also previously written for The American Spectator, Crisis, The New Criterion, Far Eastern Economic Review, Catholic World Report, The American Conservative, The Wall Street Journal Europe, and many other outlets. He is also a frequent public speaker, and has appeared at various events organized by ADF International, Austrian Economics Center, New Direction, De Nicola Center for Ethics and Culture at the University of Notre Dame, CEFAS at CEU-San Pablo University, the ID Group at the European Parliament, and the National Conservatism conferences.

Over the years, The European Conservative has published material by people closely associated with the CER, as well as by other well-known authors, such as Anthony Daniels (Theodore Dalrymple), Remi Brague, Ryszard Legutko, Chantal Delsol, Mark Dooley, Todd Huizinga, Charles Coulombe, Alberto Fernandez, Roger Watson, among others. In recent years, it has also published less-well-known authors and emerging scholars from around the world, particularly those working in languages other than English.

=== Activities and events ===
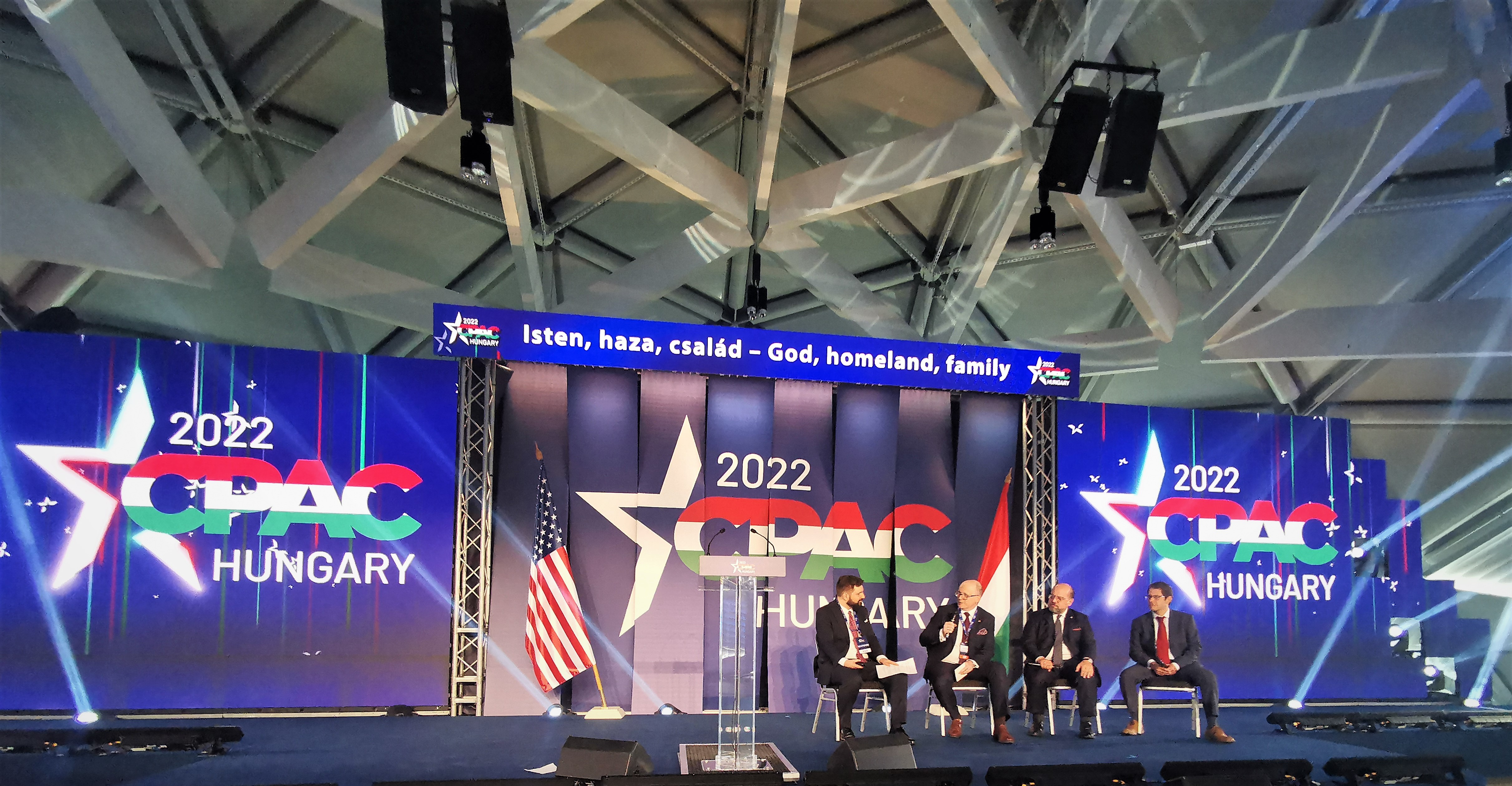
Fantini speaking at CPAC Hungary 2022

The European Conservative has organized and co-sponsored several events over the years. In June 2021, to mark the re-design and re-launch of the publication (with its Summer 2021 edition) it held a panel discussion with several scholars at one of the Scruton Cafes in Budapest, Hungary.

In September 2021, to mark the publication of its Fall 2021 edition, the publication organized a day-long series of panels at the Lónyay-Hatvany Villa in Budapest, with invited guests from the academic and political world.

In March 2022, the publication was one of several official partners of the National Conservatism Conference held in Brussels. The European Conservative has also participated in many other events, including the 2022 Young Leaders Academy, organized by New Direction and the Center for the Renewal of Culture in Split, and numerous other events organized by the Institut Iliade in Paris, the Bibliothek des Konservatismus in Berlin, the Political Network for Values, the Ladislav Hanus Institute in Bratislava, the Patromonium Sancti Adalberti in Prague, the journal Critica XXI in Lisbon, and many others.

On September 30–October 2, 2022, five days after the snap elections in Italy, The European Conservative co-organized, with Nazione Futura and the Fondazione Tatarella, a two-day conference on "Italian Conservatism". This included both English-language and Italian-language panels, with panelists and keynote speakers discussing and debating different conservative ideas as well as various approaches to conservative governance and policies. The event was heavily covered by various Italian and European media.

In April 2023, The European Conservative was the first news outlet to report on allegations that Jian Guo, a parliamentary aide of right-wing MEP Maximilian Krah, might be lobbying and spying for communist-ruled China. One year later, on 23 April 2024, the aide was arrested by German police on charges of espionage for China. These early reports were acknowledged by international media outlets like The New York Times, The Times, France24, Frankfurter Allgemeine Zeitung, and Die Welt. TEC’s editor-in-chief Alvino-Mario Fantini was quoted saying on his website's reporting "we were confirmed".

== Contributors ==
The European Conservative publishes both established and well-known conservative scholars and writers, as well as lesser known, young, or undiscovered writers around the world.

A few of the many contributors to The European Conservative over the years have included:

- Rod Dreher, American Christian journalist and author.
- Rémi Brague, French philosopher and winner of the 2012 Ratzinger Award.
- Charles Coulombe, historian and specialist in the Austro-Hungarian monarchy.
- Chantal Delsol, French philosopher.
- Anthony Daniels, English essayist.
- Mark Dooley, Irish philosopher, writer and newspaper columnist.
- Alberto M. Fernandez, former U.S. diplomat and Vice President of the Middle East Media Research Institute (MEMRI).
- Anne-Élisabeth Moutet, French journalist, writer and columnist.
- John O’Sullivan, president of the Danube Institute in Budapest and senior fellow at the National Review Institute in Washington, D.C.

== Controversies ==
An earlier Summer issue of the magazine was removed from the shelves of stockist W.H. Smith in the UK after two customers in London complained about a cartoon pointing to the 'trans indoctrination' of children in schools.

The magazine's links to Viktor Orbán and fundings from the Hungarian Fidesz party have been the subject of criticism by other media outlets.

== Current editor-in-chief ==
The quarterly magazine's current editor-in-chief is Alvino-Mario Fantini.

Former Revolutionary Communist Party member Mick Hume, a former Brexit campaigner with links to Nigel Farage, briefly served as Editor-in-Chief of the online edition (website). He was quietly replaced by Frank Furedi in 2026, who was also a founding member of the Revolutionary Communist Party, making for two consecutive digital editors of The European Conservative with extensive backgrounds in political communism.
