= Somalis in the Netherlands =

Somalis in the Netherlands Somaliërs in Nederland Soomaalida Holland
Regions with significant populations
- Rotterdam; Tilburg; The Hague; Eindhoven; Amsterdam; Netherlands

Languages
- Somali; Dutch

Religion
- Islam (95%); Irreligion (5%)

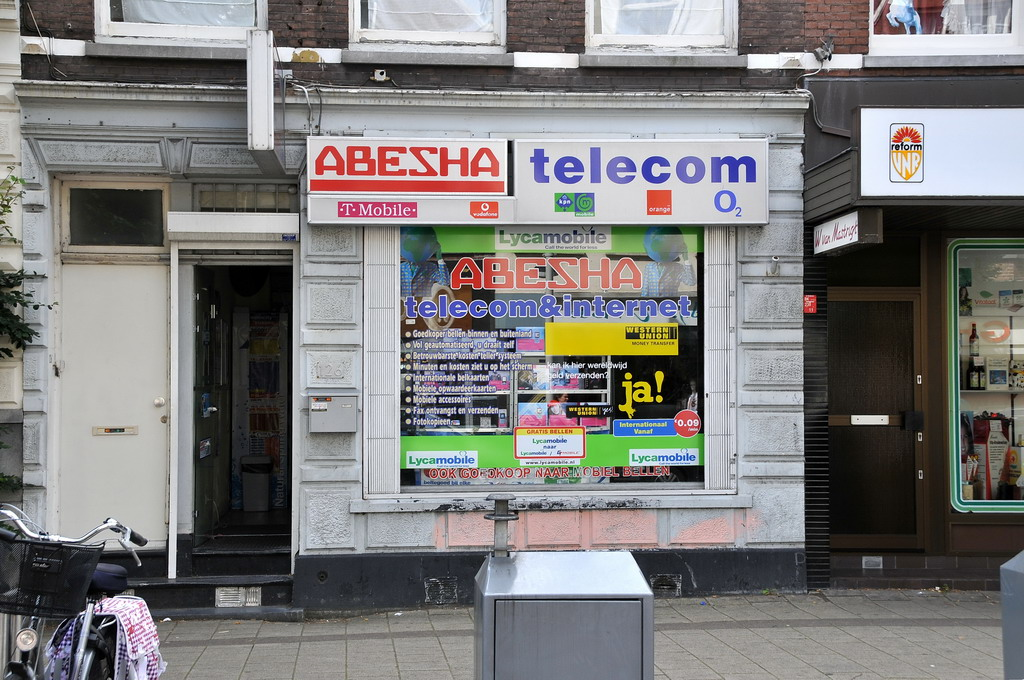
Somali telecommunications store in Rotterdam, 2010

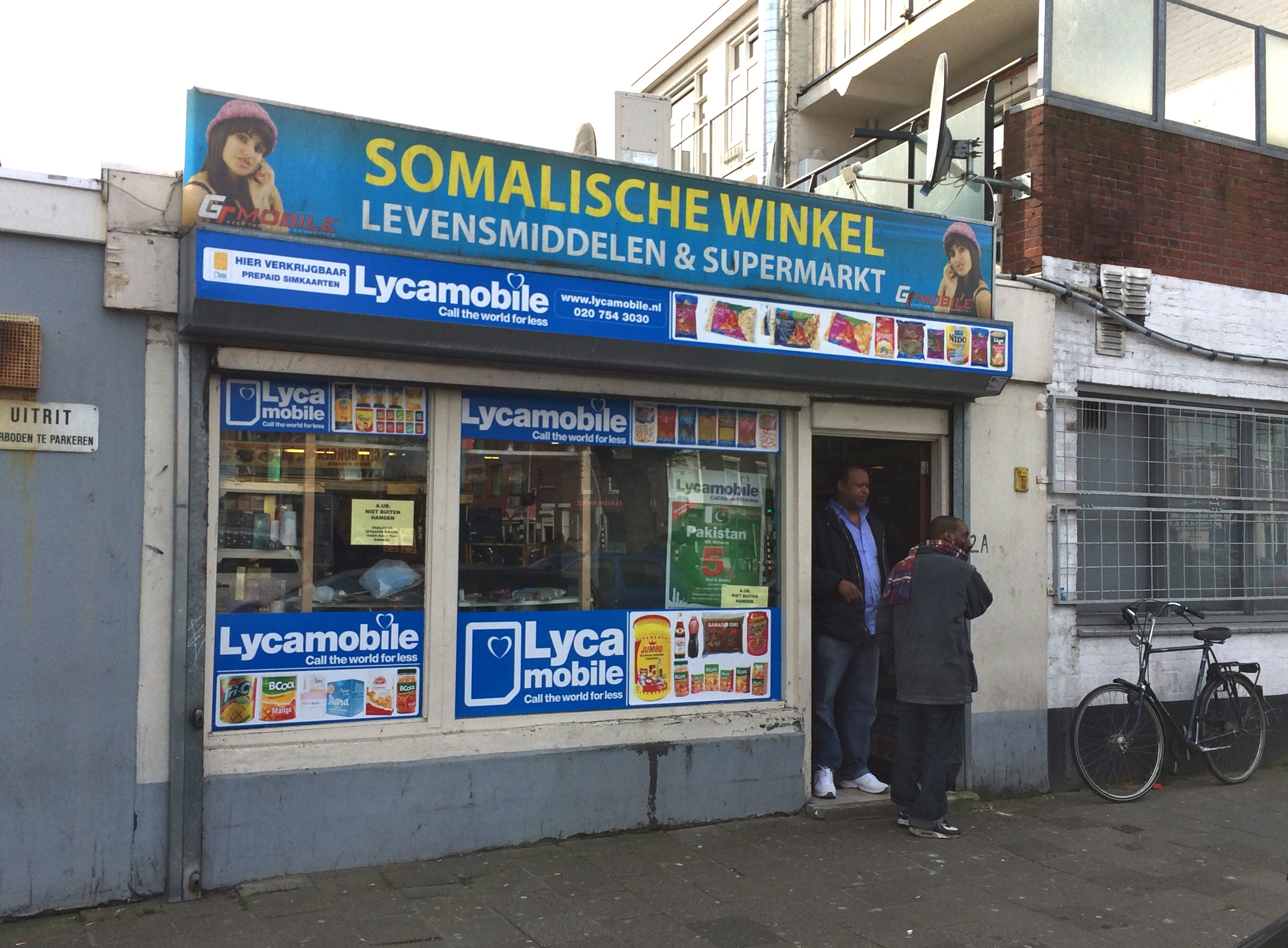
Somali grocery store in The Hague, 2015

Somalis in the Netherlands (Dutch: Somaliërs in Nederland; Somali: Soomaalida Holland) are residents or naturalized citizens of the Netherlands who are of Somali ancestry. They form one of the larger Somali communities in Europe and amongst the second largest African foreign community in the Netherlands. Somali people form the second largest African community in the Netherlands and are one of the country's fastest growing communities.

== Migration history ==
From 1989 to 1998, the Netherlands was the second-most common European destination for Somali asylum-seekers, only slightly behind the United Kingdom and more than double the total of the next-most common destination, Denmark. However, between 2000 and 2005, there was a significant outflow of Somalis from the Netherlands to the United Kingdom, unofficially estimated to be as large as 20,000 people. Factors mentioned as driving forces behind the exodus included an increase in opposition to Muslim immigration, as exemplified by the rise of politician Pim Fortuyn, Somali opposition to housing policies which forced them to live scattered in small groups all over various cities rather than in a larger agglomerated community, a restrictive socio-economic environment which, among other things, made it difficult for new arrivals to find work, and the comparative ease of starting a business and acquiring the means to get off social welfare in the UK.

== Demography ==
As of 2009, Statistics Netherlands estimated the following figures with respect to Dutch people of Somali origin:

- 15,281 persons of first-generation background (8,831 men, 6,850 women)
- 6,517 persons of second-generation background (3,322 men, 3,195 women), of which:
  - 543 persons with one parent born in the Netherlands (273 men, 270 women)
  - 5,974 persons with both parents born out of the Netherlands (3,049 men, 2,925 women)

For a total of 21,798 persons (11,753 men, 10,045 women). This represented roughly 9% growth over the 1996 total of 20,060 persons; the composition of the population had changed slightly, with the proportion of the population of second-generation background more than doubling over that time frame. The proportion of men has typically been greater than that of women. Most men are single without dependents, while most women are single mothers with one or more children. This is largely due to being only able to send certain family members to a different country.

=== Religiosity ===
According to a 2018 report, Islam takes a central role in the lives of nearly all Somalis and in many ways their religiosity increased from the already high levels in 2009.

| Religious behaviour and religious attitudes among Muslims 15 years and older, by origin, 2015 | Somali % |
|---|---|
| regards self as Muslim | 95 |
| Non-religious | 5 |
| Visits mosque at least weekly | 38 |
| Prays five times a day | 80 |
| Fasted every day during Ramadan | 70 |
| Eats halal everyday | 94 |
| Wears the headscarf (women) | 90 |
| My faith is an important part of who I am | 93 |
| I wouldn’t like it if my daughter married someone from another faith | 50 |
| Muslims should be able to live in accordance with the rules of Islam | 74 |

== Notable individuals ==
- Yasmine Allas (born 1967), actress and writer
- Ayaan Hirsi Ali (born 1969), activist and former politician
- Said Abdi Haibeh (born 1971), football manager and agent
- Abdi Nageeye (born 1989), long-distance runner
- Hussein Suleiman (born 1989), fashion designer, co-founder and CEO of Daily Paper
- Ahmed Ali (born 1990), football player
- Mohamud Ali (born 1994), football player
- Liban Abdulahi (born 1995), football player
- Abdulsamed Abdullahi (born 1997), football player
- Reiky de Valk (2000–2023), actor
- Said Ali Hussein (born 2000), football player
- Sak Hassan (born 2001), football player

== See also ==
- Somali diaspora
- Immigration to the Netherlands
