= Naema Tahir =

Dutch human rights lawyer and writer (born 1970)

- Born: August 23, 1970 (age 56); Slough, England
- Education: Leiden University
- Occupations: Lawyer; writer
- Spouse: Andreas Kinneging
- Writing career
- Period: 1996–present
- Genres: Non-fiction; fiction
- Movement: Islamic feminism

Naema Tahir (born 23 August 1970) is a Dutch human rights lawyer and author.

== Biography ==
Naema Tahir was born in Slough on August 23, 1970 into a Pakistani emigrant family. In 1980, the Tahir family moved from England to the Netherlands and settled in Etten-Leur. Tahir subsequently lived in Slough, Faisalabad in Pakistan (where her parents originally came from), Leiden, Nigeria, and Strasbourg. She studied Dutch law at Leiden University until 1996 and worked as a lawyer for Dutch and international institutions. She lived in Strasbourg, where she worked as a human rights lawyer for the Council of Europe. She took leave so that she could spend more time in the Netherlands and work on her Dutch-language books.

She was one of the six women interviewed in The Third Feminist Wave (2006) by the Flemish political philosopher Dirk Verhofstadt, alongside Yasmine Allas, Naima El Bezaz, Ayaan Hirsi Ali, Irshad Manji, and Nahed Selim. She was also one of the guests on the 2008 season of Zomergasten.

In 2009 Gijsbert Pols concluded that she presented herself as an "enlightened" or "critical" Muslim woman.

From 2011 to 2012 she was a columnist for the television programmes Buitenhof and Altijd Wat. She later wrote columns for the newspaper Trouw. In November 2019, she received her doctorate on the subject of arranged marriage.

== Personal life ==
Tahir is married to Andreas Kinneging, a legal scholar and professor of philosophy of law at Leiden University.

== Bibliography ==
Year	Title	Publisher	ISBN	Notes
2004	Een moslima ontsluiert	Houtekiet	ISBN 9789089240811	Memoir and opinion pieces
2004	Moslim in het paradijs: Op zoek naar de mens in de moslim	Houtekiet	ISBN 9789052407838	
2006	Kostbaar bezit	Prometheus	ISBN 9789044607109	Three stories
2008	Groenkapje en de bekeerde wolf en andere moslimsprookjes	Meulenhoff	ISBN 9789029083294	Seven Muslim fairy tales for adults
2009	Eenzaam heden	Sanoma; Meulenhoff	ISBN 9789079088263	Novel
2010	De mensen? Ze hebben geen wortels en daar hebben ze last van. De twijfels en de trots van de ontwortelden	International Organization for Migration		Non-fiction
2011	Bruid van de dood	De Geus	ISBN 9789044515503	Novel
2015	Gesluierde vrijheid: De moslima in de moderne wereld	Prometheus	ISBN 9789044623826	A Muslim woman's view on the freedom and emancipation of modern Muslim women: emancipation with the Quran in hand
2016	Brieven in Urdu	Prometheus	ISBN 9789044630008	Stories
2017	Trein naar Pakistan	Hollands Diep	ISBN 9789048836130	Introduction to the Dutch translation (by Ankie Blommesteijn) of Khushwant Singh's Train to Pakistan
2019	Feminisme en groepsculturen	Atlas Contact	ISBN 9789045037837	Essay in the anthology Wolf: Dertien essays over de vrouw, edited by Maartje Laterveer
2022	Breaking Eurocentric Frames on Arranged Marriage: Uncovering the Dynamics of a Marital Institution	Eleven	ISBN 9789462362871	Academic work (in English)

== See also ==
- Migrant literature
