= Center for European Renewal =

European conservative think tank

The Center for European Renewal (CER) is a pan-European conservative organization based in Amsterdam, the Netherlands. The CER was founded in the summer of 2007 by a group of mainly European conservatives. They included Dutch ethicist and legal philosopher Andreas Kinneging, the (late) German political thinker Caspar von Schrenck-Notzing, Czech think-tank director Roman Joch, Spanish publishing executive Jorge Soley Climent, Flemish law professor Matthias Storme, and Alexandre Pesey of L'Institut de formation politique (IFP).

Following an exploratory meeting in the spring of 2006, the CER has held annual summer meetings—in Vienna (2007), Madrid (2008), Budapest (2009), Kraków (2010), Leuven (2011), Cirencester (2012), Prague (2013), Warsaw (2014), Dubrovnik (2015), Cirencester (2016), Berlin (2017), and Riga (2018). Speakers at these meetings have included Roger Scruton, Ryszard Legutko, Chantal Delsol, David Gress, Rémi Brague, Anthony Daniels, Agnieszka Kołakowska, Gabriele Kuby, and Douglas Murray, as well as other young scholars, policy analysts, journalists, and political activists.

The CER aims to become a European network of thinkers, writers, scholars, etc., along the lines of the U.S.-based Philadelphia Society. Inspired by the Intercollegiate Studies Institute, it also hopes to eventually offer educational programs. To date, the CER has published one collection of essays, Plato on Wall Street, in collaboration with the Ośrodek Myśli Politycznej (Centre for Political Thought). Some members of the CER also produce a quarterly magazine entitled The European Conservative.

== Sources ==
'Educating for Liberty in Old Europe', The Canon, the Intercollegiate Studies's member and alumni magazine, Fall 2007, pp. 24–29.
