= Dirk Verhofstadt =

Belgian philosopher (born 1955)

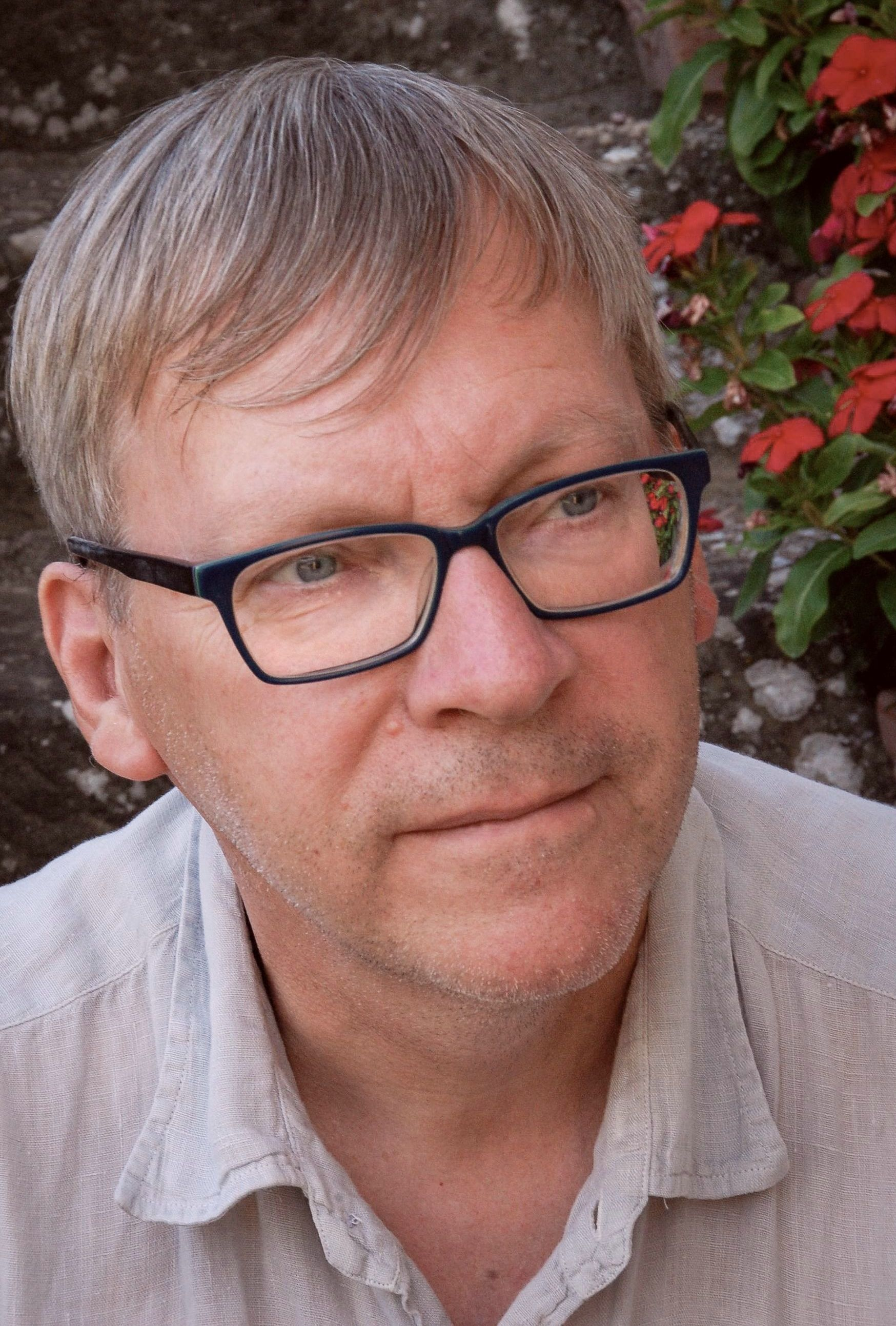
- Born: Dirk Verhofstadt; 25 August 1955 (age 71); Dendermonde, Belgium
- Citizenship: Belgium
- Education: Moral Philosophy (PhD 2010)
- Alma mater: University of Ghent
- Occupation: Author
- Relatives: Guy Verhofstadt (brother)
- Writing career
- Genre: Non-fiction
- Subjects: Philosophy, liberalism, social liberalism, atheism

Philosophical work
- Era: Contemporary
- Region: Western
- School: Social liberalism
- Main interests: Liberalism, social liberalism, atheism, moral philosophy, ethics

Dirk Verhofstadt (born 25 August 1955 in Dendermonde) is a Belgian social liberal and Rawlsian theorist and younger brother of former Belgian Prime Minister and former ALDE leader Guy Verhofstadt. He has a keen interest in political philosophy, and his philosophical outlook is influenced by Karl Popper, John Stuart Mill, Cesare Beccaria, Thomas Paine, Amartya Sen, and Martha Nussbaum.

== Early life and education ==
Verhofstadt was born on 25 August 1955 in Dendermonde, a municipality in the Flemish Community of Belgium. He graduated in law and press- and communication sciences, and obtained a PhD in moral philosophy at the University of Ghent. He was professor Media and ethics at the University of Ghent until 2020. On 1 July 2010, he obtained the degree of Doctor of Moral Science at the University of Ghent with his doctoral dissertation "Pius XII and the extermination of the Jews. A moral and historical research into the moral responsibility of Pope Pius XII regarding the Final Solution to the Jewish Question".

== Think tank ==
Verhofstadt is a member of Liberales, an independent think tank within the liberal movement. Its members consider liberalism as a progressive movement supporting individual freedom, justice and human rights. Liberales reacts against what it calls "narrow minded conservatism" related to social economic, ecological, and ethical issues supported by "compartmentalized" parties and structures.

== Writings ==
With his book Het menselijk liberalisme (Human Liberalism), Verhofstadt inspires politicians in Belgian liberal parties, as well as in the Dutch parties People's Party for Freedom and Democracy and Democrats 66. He defends liberalism against attacks by anti-globalists, stating that liberalism implies/should imply solidarity and that green politics is not contradictory to liberalism. He wrote the books Pleidooi voor het individualisme (A Plea for Individualism) and De derde feministische golf (The Third Feminist Wave), much of it focusing on Islamic feminism and its impact in Europe. This book contains exclusive interviews with Ayaan Hirsi Ali, Irshad Manji, Naima El Bezaz, Nahed Selim, Naema Tahir, and Yasmine Allas.

On 26 September 2008, Verhofstadt released his new book Pius XII and the Extermination of the Jews in the Dutch language. In this book, he examines the position of Pacelli, the later Pope Pius XII, towards Adolf Hitler's seizure of power, the downfall of the Catholic Centre Party, the Reichskonkordat between Nazi Germany and the Holy See, the encyclical Mit brennender Sorge (With Burning Concern), paganism, the Nazi education programs, the Aktion 74 (the murder of physically and mentally handicapped persons), the invasion of Poland, Operation Barbarossa, the Jews in the Netherlands, priest-president Jozef Tiso of Slovakia, the Ustaše in the Independent State of Croatia, the deportation of Jews from Rome, the Holocaust in Hungary, the help offered to war criminals, the resistance against Nazism, the alleged refusal of the Church to "give back Jewish" children who had been in hiding, the failures of the Allies, alleged antisemitism after the Holocaust, and the moral question of alleged guilt of the Church and the pope.

In November 2019, Verhofstadt published the book Ide Leib Kartuz. Tailor in Auschwitz with David Van Turnhout as co-author. In July 2022, the English version (A Tailor in Auschwitz) was published by Pen & Sword Books. In 2021, he published the book Chef in IG-Auschwitz with Anne Van Paemel as co-author. In 2022, he wrote the book Diary 1933 about the danger of the far-right emerging worldwide. In 2024, he published the book KZ Syndrome: A Scar that Never Goes Away, with Henri Heimans as co-author, about two people who survived the Nazi concentration camps in Ravensbrück, Auschwitz, Mauthausen, and Ebensee. In December 2025, he published an updated version of his Diary 1933, which focused extensively on the undemocratic actions of Donald Trump.

== Bibliography ==
- Dagboek 1933 (Diary 1933, updated version) (2025)
- KZ-syndroom (KZ syndrome) (2024) co-authored with Henri Heimans
- Dagboek 1933 (Diary 1933) (2022)
- A Tailor in Auschwitz (2022) co-authored with David Van Turnhout - Pen & Sword Books
- In gesprek met Johan Braeckman. Een zoektocht naar menselijkheid (2021)
- Chef-kok in IG Auschwitz (Chef at IG-Auschwitz) (2021) co-authored with Annie Van Paemel
- The Liberal Canon. The Foundations of Liberalism (2020)
- Resoconto intermedio sugli archivi di Pio XII (rapport) (2020)
- Ide Leib Kartuz. Kleermaker in Auschwitz (A Tailor in Auschwitz) (2019) co-authored with David Van Turnhout
- De liberale ideologie. Voorbij het links-rechts denken (2019)
- In Naam van God (2018), co-authored with Paul Cliteur
- De geschiedenis van het liberalisme (2017)
- Theorieën over rechtvaardigheid. De John Rawlslezingen (Ed.) (2017)
- L'Olocausto Ungherese: e il silenzio di Pio XII (2016)
- Salafisme versus democratie (2016)
- Het Atheïstisch Woordenboek (2015), co-authored with Paul Cliteur
- De Liberale Canon (2015)
- Cesare Beccaria. 250 jaar over misdaden en straffen (2014)
- 1914. Het vervloekte jaar (2014)
- Atheïsme als basis voor de moraal (2013)
- Pius XII. und die Vernichtung der Juden (2013)
- A Plea for Individualism (2013)
- In gesprek met Paul Cliteur. Een zoektocht naar harmonie (2012)
- De open samenleving onder vuur (Ed.) (2012)
- Media en ethiek (2012)
- De Laatste Getuigen (2011), co-author Luckas Vander Taelen
- In gesprek met Etienne Vermeersch. Een zoektocht naar waarheid (2011)
- A moral and historical research into the moral responsibility of Pope Pius XII regarding the Final Solution to the Jewish Question (2010)
- Het liberale denken van Thomas Paine (Ed). (2009)
- John Stuart Mill. 150 jaar over vrijheid (Ed). (2009)
- Pius XII en de vernietiging van de Joden (2008)
- De derde feministische golf (2006)
- Pleidooi voor individualisme (2004)
- Het menselijk liberalisme (2002)
- Het einde van het BRT-monopolie (1982)

== See also ==
- Contributions to liberal theory
- Liberalism
- Liberalism in Belgium
