= La Fin de la Chrétienté =

2021 book by Chantal Delsol

- First edition
- Author: Chantal Delsol
- Cover artist: M. C. Escher
- Subject: Philosophy, religion
- Publisher: Éditions du Cerf
- Publication date: October 2021
- Pages: 176
- ISBN: 9782204146197

La Fin de la Chrétienté (The End of the Christian World) is a 2021 book by philosopher Chantal Delsol that portends a return to paganism after centuries of Christendom. It is published in French by Éditions du Cerf.

== Bibliography ==
- Caldwell, Christopher (December 29, 2021). "Is the West Becoming Pagan Again?". The New York Times. ISSN 0362-4331.
- Cordelier, Jérôme (October 17, 2021). "La chute de l'empire chrétien". Le Point (in French).
- Devecchio, Alexandre (October 29, 2021). "Chantal Delsol: "La civilisation occidentale ne disparaît pas, elle se transforme. Mais jusqu'où?"". Le Figaro (in French).
- Giroux, Matthieu (December 1, 2021). "" La Fin de la chrétienté " : le pamphlet de Chantal Delsol contre la postmodernité". Le Monde.fr (in French).
- Rioux, Christian (December 17, 2021). "Noël malgré tout". Le Devoir (in French).
- Roure, David (December 17, 2021). "Après le christianisme, le paganisme ?". La Croix (in French). ISSN 0242-6056.
