= Salad Farah =

Somali football manager

Personal information
- Full name: Salad Farah Hassan
- Place of birth: Somalia

Managerial career
- Years: Team
- Jeenyo United
- Somalia U17
- 2021–2022: Somalia

Salad Farah Hassan (Somali: Salaad Faarax Xasan) is a Somali football manager who was most recently the manager of the Somalia national team.

== Career ==
During the 2016–17 Somali First Division season, Farah was manager of Jeenyo United.

Farah managed the Somalia under-17 team during the 2018 CECAFA U-17 Championship, finishing runners-up in the process.

In June 2021, following the sacking of Abdellatif Salef, Farah took up the reigns of the Somalia national football team for games against Djibouti and Oman. In February 2022, Farah was replaced as Somalia manager by Pieter de Jongh.
