= Verhofstadt =

Verhofstadt is a Dutch surname. Notable people with the surname include:

- Dirk Verhofstadt (born 1955), Belgian liberal thinker
- Guy Verhofstadt (born 1953), Belgian politician, brother of Dirk
