= Ali Abdi Farah (football manager) =

Somali professional football manager

Personal information
- Place of birth: Somalia

Managerial career
- Years: Team
- 2003–2005: Somalia
- 2008–2009: Somalia

Ali Abdi Farah is a Somali professional football manager. From October 2003 to December 2005 and from September 2008 to December 2009 he coached the Somalia national football team.
