= Somalia national football team =

Somalia
- Nickname: The Ocean Stars
- Association: Somali Football Federation (SFF) (Xiriirka Soomaaliyeed ee Kubbadda Cagta)
- Confederation: CAF (Africa)
- Sub-confederation: CECAFA (Central & East Africa)
- Head coach: Yusuf Ali Nur
- Captain: Abdulsamed Abdullahi
- Most caps: Omar Abdulkadir (31)
- Top scorer: Abdullahi Sheikh Mohamed; Mohamed Ali Abdi Nur (3)
- Home stadium: Mogadishu Stadium
- FIFA code: SOM
First colours	Second colours	Third colours

FIFA ranking
- Current: 199 ▲1 (18 November 2026)
- Highest: 65 (April–June 1996)
- Lowest: 203 (April–May 2019)

First international
- Kenya 5–1 Somalia (Mombasa, Kenya; 1958)

Biggest win
- Somalia 5–2 Mauritania (Casablanca, Morocco; 7 August 1985)

Biggest defeat
- North Korea 13–1 Somalia (Jakarta, Indonesia; 14 November 1963)

CECAFA Cup
- Appearances: 26 (first in 1973)
- Best result: Fifth place (1974, 1977, 1978, 1984, 1994, 2019)

Arab Games
- Appearances: 1 (first in 1985)
- Best result: Group stage (1985)

The Somalia national football team (Somali: Kooxda Qaranka Soomaaliya) represents Somalia in international football and is controlled by the Somali Football Federation (SFF), a member of the Confederation of African Football (CAF). Somalia's first national team captain was Mohamed Shangole, while its longest serving captain has been Hasan Babay.

Somalia has never qualified for the FIFA World Cup and Africa Cup of Nations.

== History ==
The first Somali football teams were established in the 1940s. The competitions were basic in structure and were associated with the anti-colonial movement. The Somali Youth League (SYL), the nation's first political party, had put together a team of local youth to play against the Italian expatriate teams. The soccer team the FYL had assembled, which would later change its name to Bondhere, won the first several competitions. In 1951, the Somali Football Federation (SFF) was founded. The first Somali commissioner for sport was later established in 1958.

Although the Somali national football team took part in preliminary matches, it has never qualified for the World Cup. For many years after the outbreak of the civil war in the early 1990s, FIFA-sanctioned games could not be played within the country. Qualifying matches for the Africa Cup of Nations and the World Cup were instead contested away from home. However, following the pacification of the capital Mogadishu in 2011, the SFF began preparations for the first major sporting event to be held in years at the Mogadishu Stadium, in December 2012.

Prior to 2019, the Somali FA decided they would admit to all their young and upcoming youth talents and put out local trials to fortify both Olympic and national football teams.

In addition, many from the Somali diaspora in the past have produced quality football players such as Islam Feruz and Mukhtar Ali.

On 5 September 2019, Somalia won their first qualifying match since 1984 (against Kenya - AFCON Qualifying) and their first-ever FIFA World Cup qualifying match, beating Zimbabwe by 1–0. They nearly advanced to the second round but lost 3–1 in Zimbabwe after two late goals for the warriors, consigning the Ocean Stars to an early exit.

== Team image ==
=== Kits and crest ===
Kit provider	Period
(Somalia) A2Z Sports	2020–present

From the 1970s up until the 1990s, the Somali national football team used to wear the Somali Flag and socks with the Somali Flag for home kits and the inverse as away kits, the two primary colours of the Somali national flags, in the 2010s up until the present, the national team have now replaced the solid sky blue shirts for vertically blue and white striped shirts.

The crest of the Somali national team used to be the coat of arms of Somalia but it is now replaced with the Somali Federation crest. The Ocean Stars plays their home games in the Mogadishu Stadium, (As the stadium was being rebuilt, the national team played matches at Engineer Yaarisow Stadium, which is Mogadishu's secondary stadium for sporting events).

Somalia's first colours in the 1970s–1990s	Somalia's second colours in the 1970s–1990s

== Results and fixtures ==
The following is a list of match results in the last 12 months, as well as any future matches that have been scheduled.

Win Draw Loss Fixture

=== 2025 ===
17 November Friendly	Bahrain	1–2	Somalia	Riffa, Bahrain
18:30 UTC+3	Al-Romaihi 35'	Report	Omar 45'; Marsis 80'	Stadium: Bahrain National Stadium; Referee: Saud Al-Samhan (Kuwait)

26 November 2025 FIFA Arab Cup qualification	Oman	0–0 (4–1 p)	Somalia	Doha, Qatar
16:00 UTC+3		Report		Stadium: Abdullah Bin Khalifa Stadium; Attendance: 3,957; Referee: Juan Calderón (Costa Rica)
	Penalties
	Al-Busaidi (penalty scored); Al-Rawahi (penalty scored); Al-Yahyaei (penalty scored); Al-Ghafri (penalty scored)		(penalty missed) S. Hassan; (penalty scored) M. Omar; (penalty missed) Musse

=== 2026 ===
27 March 2027 Africa Cup of Nations qualification	Somalia	0–0	Mauritius	Matola, Mozambique
15:00 UTC+2		Report		Stadium: Arena Lalgy Tchumene; Referee: Kouassi Biro (Ivory Coast)

31 March 2027 Africa Cup of Nations qualification	Mauritius	0–0 (2–4 p)	Somalia	Saint Pierre, Mauritius
19:00 UTC+4		Report		Stadium: Côte d'Or National Sports Complex; Referee: Ali Brahamou Sadou (Niger)
	Penalties
	Rose (penalty scored); Alizart (penalty missed); Ferré (penalty scored); Perticots (penalty missed)		Awad (penalty scored); Akram (penalty scored); Sharif (penalty scored); Suleiman (penalty scored)

25 September 2027 Africa Cup of Nations qualification	Gambia	2–1	Somalia	Bakau, Gambia
16:00 UTC+0	Colley 18' (pen.); Badamosi 83'	Report	Njie 72'	Stadium: Independence Stadium; Referee: Andofetra Rakotojaona (Madagascar)

29 September 2027 AFCON Qualifiers	Somalia	0–2	Ivory Coast	Accra, Ghana
19:00 UTC+0		Report	Gboho 89'; Touré 90+5'	Stadium: Accra Sports Stadium; Referee: David Chinoko (Malawi)

11 November 2027 AFCON Qualifiers	Ghana	2–0	Somalia	Essipong
15:00 UTC+0	Adjetey 45+2'; Afena-Gyan 62'	Report		Stadium: Sekondi-Takoradi Stadium, Essipong; Referee: André Kolissala (Central African Republic)

15 November 2027 AFCON Qualifiers	Somalia	0–1	Ghana	TBD
15:00 UTC+0		Report	Ayew 36' (pen.)	Stadium: Sekondi-Takoradi Stadium, Essipong (Ghana); Referee: Mweshitsama Naftal (Namibia)

=== 2027 ===
24 March 2027 AFCON Qualifiers	Somalia	v	Gambia	TBD, Somalia
TBD				Stadium: TBD

28 March 2027 AFCON Qualifiers	Ivory Coast	v	Somalia	TBD, Ivory Coast
TBD				Stadium: TBD

== Coaches ==
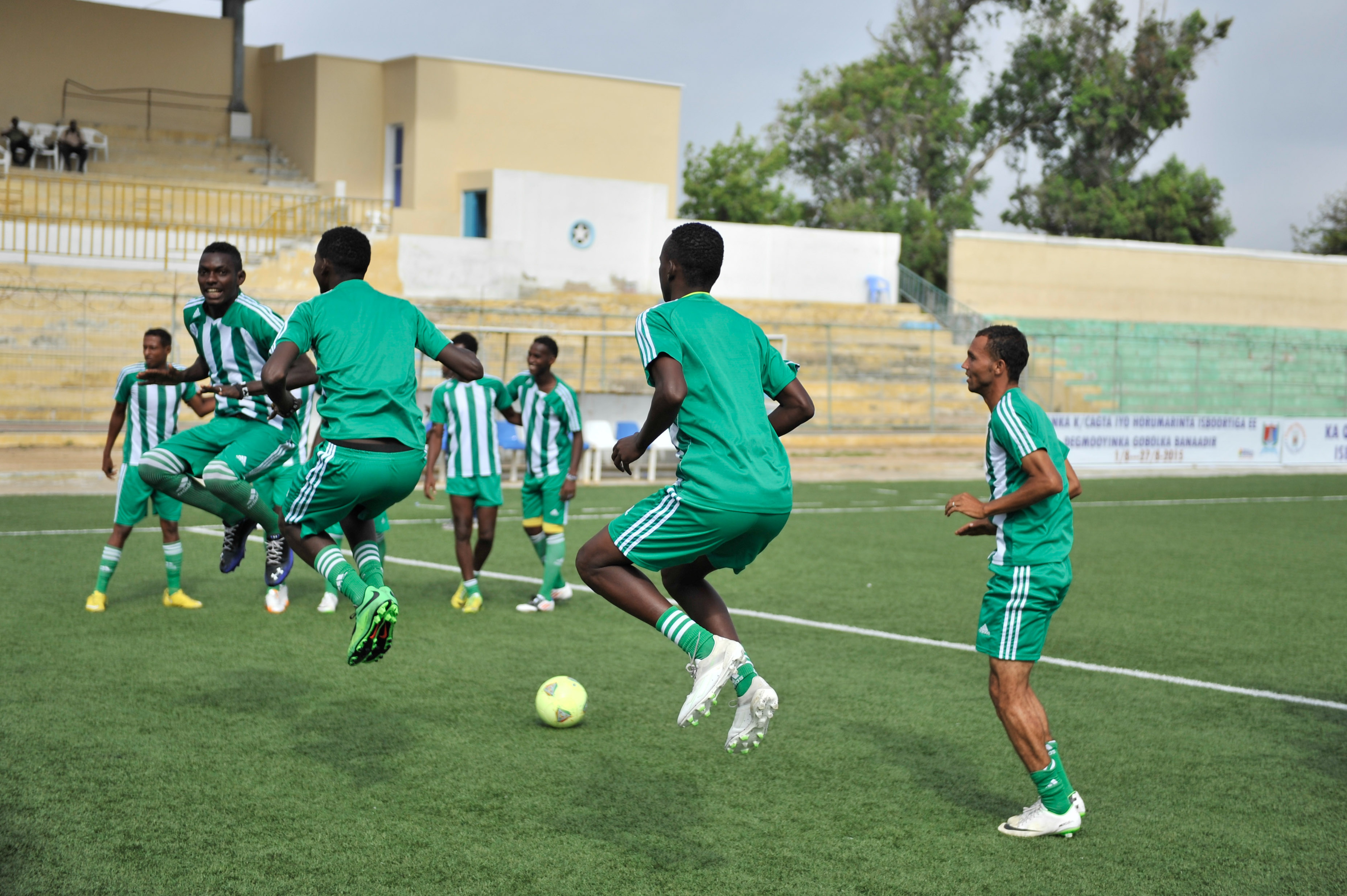
The Somalia national football team players during a training session in 2015

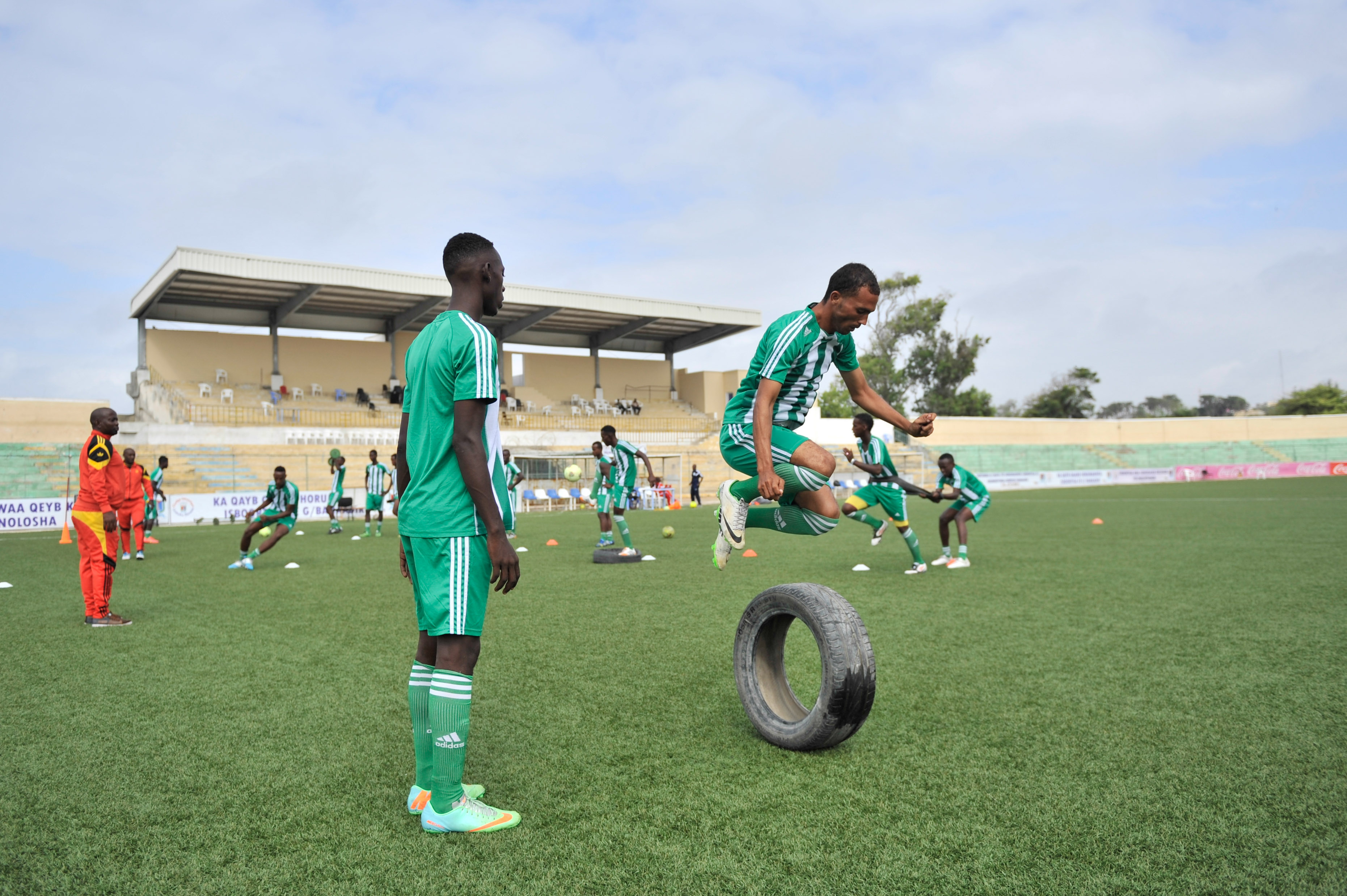
Another picture of the Somalia national football team players in 2015

Name	Nat	Period	Matches	Wins	Draws	Losses	Win rate
Qi Wusheng	(China)	1978–1979					
Klaus Ebbighausen	(West Germany)	1980					
Hussein Ali Abdulle	(Somalia)	May 1999 – Dec 2000	8	0	1	7	6.3%
Awil Ismail Mohamed	(Somalia)	Nov 2001 – Dec 2002	7	1	2	4	28.6%
Ali Abdi Farah	(Somalia)	Oct 2003 – Dec 2005	9	1	0	8	11.1%
Daniel Muwathe	(Kenya)	Oct 2006 – Dec 2006	6	0	0	6	0%
Hussein Ali Abdulle	(Somalia)	Oct 2007 – Dec 2007	4	0	0	4	0%
Ali Abdi Farah	(Somalia)	Sept 2008 – Dec 2009	8	2	0	6	25%
Mohamed Farayare	(Somalia)	Jan 2010 – Mar 2010	2	1	0	1	50%
Yousef Adam	(Qatar)	Oct 2010 – Dec 2010	3	0	0	3	0%
Alfred Imonje	(Kenya)	Oct 2011 – Dec 2011	5	0	1	4	10%
Sam Ssimbwa	(Uganda)	Dec 2011 – Oct 2013	6	0	0	6	0%
Sam Ssimbwa	(Uganda)	Mar 2014 – Sept 2015	2	0	0	2	0%
Charles Mbabazi	(Uganda)	Sept 2015					
Haruna Mawa	(Uganda)	Nov 2016 – Nov 2019					
Bashir Hayford	(Ghana)	Mar 2019 – 2019	7	2	2	3	42.8%
Said Abdi Haibeh	(Somalia)	Dec 2019 – May 2021	4	1	2	1	25%
Abdellatif Salef	(Morocco)	May 2021 – June 2021	0	0	0	0	0%
Salad Farah	(Somalia)	June 2021 – February 2022	2	0	0	2	0%
Pieter de Jongh	(Netherlands)	February 2022 – May 2022	2	0	0	2	0%
Rachid Lousteque	(Morocco)	July 2022 – 2023	0	0	0	0	0%

== Players ==
=== Current squad ===
The following players were selected for the 2026 FIFA World Cup qualification matches against Guinea and Botswana on 21 and 25 March 2025, respectively.

Caps and goals correct as of 25 March 2025, after the match against Botswana.

No.	Pos.	Player	Date of birth (age)	Caps	Goals	Club
	GK	Abdirahman Mohamud	1 January 2001 (age 25)	5	0	(Somali Football Federation) Dekedaha
	GK	Ibrahim Ahmed Hussein	23 December 2005 (age 20)	1	0	(Somali Football Federation) Waxool
	GK	Aleeleya Sheikh Saeed		0	0	(Somali Football Federation) Mogadishu City
	DF	Abel Gigli	16 August 1990 (age 36)	11	1	(Italian Football Federation) Correggese
	DF	Mohamud Ali	8 July 1994 (age 32)	10	0	(The Football Association) Atherton Collieries
	DF	Yonis Farah	4 September 1999 (age 27)	9	0	(Football Federation of Kosovo) FC Mitrovica
	DF	Ayman Mohamed Hussein	12 December 2000 (age 25)	8	0	(Somali Football Federation) Horseed
	DF	Faisal Othman	13 March 1997 (age 29)	7	0	(Saudi Arabian Football Federation) Jeddah Club
	DF	Fahad Fussad	21 March 2000 (age 26)	5	0	(Football Association of Finland) EIF
	DF	Ali Omar	14 September 1999 (age 27)	2	0	(Scottish Football Association) Dumbarton
	DF	Abdulle Abdullahi	3 November 2006 (age 20)	2	0	(Somali Football Federation) Dekedaha
	DF	Suleyman Sidali	2 October 2004 (age 22)	0	0	(Somali Football Federation) Dekedaha
	MF	Ahmed Hirabe	12 December 1997 (age 28)	12	0	(Somali Football Federation) Horseed
	MF	Abdulsamed Abdullahi	19 January 1997 (age 29)	10	0	(Football Association of Montenegro) Arsenal Tivat
	MF	Mukhtar Suleiman	10 August 1998 (age 28)	10	0	(Royal Dutch Football Association) VV Katwijk
	MF	Ibrahim Ilyas	5 March 2000 (age 26)	6	0	(Tanzania Football Federation) KMC
	MF	Aweys Adan	14 June 1995 (age 31)	5	0	(Somali Football Federation) Dekedaha
	MF	Mohamed Omar	22 January 1999 (age 27)	2	0	(United States Soccer Federation) Indy Eleven
	FW	Mohamed Awad	7 May 1994 (age 32)	12	1	(Malta Football Association) Sliema Wanderers
	FW	Sak Hassan	21 March 2001 (age 25)	11	2	(The Football Association) Dover Athletic
	FW	Yusuf Ahmed	24 April 1997 (age 29)	10	1	(Football Australia) Avondale
	FW	Issa Adim Abatari	13 February 2002 (age 24)	6	0	(Somali Football Federation) Mogadishu City
	FW	Ali Musse	1 January 1996 (age 30)	6	0	(Canadian Soccer Association) Cavalry
	FW	Mahad Shine	19 August 2001 (age 25)	6	0	(Somali Football Federation) Horseed
	FW	Bilal Habib	21 November 2000 (age 25)	2	0	(Football Australia) Altona Magic
	FW	Bilal Njie	13 June 1998 (age 28)	3	1	(Norwegian Football Federation) KFUM

=== Recent call-ups ===
The following players have also been called up to the Somalia squad within the last twelve months.

Pos.	Player	Date of birth (age)	Caps	Goals	Club	Latest call-up
	GK	Khalid Nor		0	0	(Football Kenya Federation) Ziwani Youth
	DF	Ahmed Abdullahi Abdi	20 October 2000 (age 26)	6	0	(Football Kenya Federation) Mombasa United
	MF	Osman Addo	31 March 2004 (age 22)	2	0	(Danish Football Association) Viborg FF
	FW	Moussa Njie	2 October 1995 (age 31)	1	0	(Norwegian Football Federation) KFUM
	FW	Abdi Sabriye	5 March 2002 (age 24)	1	0	(Swedish Football Association) Kalmar FF

== Player records ==
As of 31 March 2026
Players in bold are still active with Somalia.

=== Most appearances ===
Rank	Player	Caps	Goals	Career
1	Omar Abdulkadir	31	0	1999–2007
2	Yasin Egal	20	0	2003–2011
3	**Mustaf Yuusuf**	18	0	2015-present
4	**Abel Gigli**	17	1	2019-present
5	**Abdulsamed Abdullahi**	16	0	2019-present
5	**Mohamud Ali**	16	0	2019-present
7	**Farhan Mohamed Ahmed**	15	2	2019-present
7	**Sak Hassan**	15	2	2022–present
9	**Mohamed Awad**	14	1	2021–present
9	**Ahmed Hirabe**	14	0	2017–present
9	**Mukhtar Suleiman**	14	0	2022–present

=== Top goalscorers ===
Rank	Player	Goals	Caps	Ratio	Career
1	Abdullahi Sheikh	3	6	0.5	2000–2005
1	Mohamed Ali Abdi Nur	3	8	0.38	1980–1995
3	Omar Mohamed	2	6	0.33	2019
3	Mohamed Abdiaziz	2	11	0.18	2006–2011
3	**Issa Adim Abatari**	2	11	0.18	2023–present
3	Ciise Abshir	2	11	0.18	2003–2011
3	**Farhan Mohamed Ahmed**	2	15	0.13	2019–present
3	**Sak Hassan**	2	15	0.13	2022–present

== Records and statistics ==
- Somalia player sent off: Abdi Mohamed, v Uganda, 21 November 2023 (45+2nd minutes)
- Opponent player sent off: (3 times)
  - Bernard Dong Bortey, v Ghana, 19 November 2003 (59th minutes)
  - Tesfaye Alebachew, v Ethiopia, 12 November 2011 (64th minutes)
  - Landry Ndikumana, v Burundi, 13 December 2019 (90th minutes)
- Longest winning streak: 1: (15 times)
- Longest unbeaten streak: 4: (2 times)
  - from 13 November 1978 to 17 November 1980
  - from 17 November 2025 to 31 March 2026
- Longest losing streak: 18: from 16 November 2011 to 22 July 2019
- Longest winless streak: 28: from 5 January 2009 to 22 July 2019
- Longest draw streak: 4: from 13 November 1978 to 17 November 1980
- Longest goalless streak: 988 minutes: from 25 November 2012 to 22 April 2017
- Most consecutive minutes without conceding a goal: 342 minutes: from 17 November 2025 to 25 September 2026
- Longest goalless streak by both teams: 342 minutes: from 17 November 2025 to 25 September 2026
- Largest comeback to wins the match: 1: v Bahrain, 17 November 2025
- Largest blown lead to lose the match: Trucktown
- Largest comeback to draw the match: 2: v Eswatini, 26 March 2024
- Largest blown lead to draw the match: Trucktown
- Longest winning streak at the FIFA World Cup qualifiers: 1: v Zimbabwe, 5 September 2019
- Longest losing streak at the FIFA World Cup qualifiers: 5: (2 times)
  - from 19 April 2000 to 16 November 2007
  - from 25 March 2025 to 14 October 2025
- Longest draw streak at the FIFA World Cup qualifiers: 2: from 16 July 1980 to 27 July 1980
- Longest unbeaten streak at the FIFA World Cup qualifiers: 2: from 16 July 1980 to 27 July 1980
- Longest goalless streak at the FIFA World Cup qualifiers: 895 minutes: from 19 April 2000 to 5 September 2019
- Most consecutive minutes without conceding a goal at the FIFA World Cup qualifiers: 188 minutes: from 13 October 2015 to 10 September 2019
- Most appearances: 31: Omar Abdulkadir, from 27 July 1999 to 12 December 2007
- Most consecutive appearances: 20: Omar Abdulkadir, from 27 July 1999 to 18 December 2004
- Top goalscorer: 3: (2 times)
  - Abdullahi Sheikh, from 19 April 2000 to 29 November 2005
  - Mohamed Ali Abdi Nur, from 16 July 1980 to 4 December 1995
- Most goals in one calendar year: 3: Ali Abdelaziz, 2006
- Most conscutive matches goals scored: 3: Mohamed Ali Abdi Nur, from 10 August 1985 to 1 December 1994
- Somalia own goal scored: - (4 times)
  - Ali Muse, v Kenya, 23 November 1984
  - Moalim Bader, v Rwanda, 29 November 2009
  - Ahmed Abdullahi Abdi, v Algeria, 16 November 2023
  - Faisal Othman, v Guinea, 5 September 2025
- Most goals by a player in a match: 2: (2 times)
  - Abdilahi Abdi, v Zambia, 8 November 1976
  - Ali Abdelaziz, v Mauritania, 27 December 2006
- Most goals by a player in first half: 1: (9 times)
- Most goals by a player in second half: 1: (21 times)
- Most goals by a opponent player in a match: 5: Mrisho Ngasa, v Tanzania, 1 December 2012
- Most goals by a opponent player in first half: 3: (2 times)
  - Felix Sunzu, v Zambia, 3 December 2010
  - Mrisho Ngasa, v Tanzania, 1 December 2012
- Most goals by a opponent player in second half: 3: Emmanuel Okwi, v Uganda, 28 November 2011
- Biggest wins: 3: v Mauritania, 7 August 1985
- Biggest defeat: 14: v North Korea, 14 November 1963
- Most goals in a match: 5: v Mauritania, 7 August 1985
- Most goals in first half: 1: (9 times)
- Most goals in second half: 2: v Eswatini, 26 March 2024
- Most goals conceded in a match: 14: v North Korea, 14 November 1963
- Most goals conceded in first half: 6: v Mauritania, 27 December 2006
- Most goals conceded in second half: 4: (3 times)
  - v Ghana, 16 November 2003
  - v Sudan, 18 December 2004
  - v Ethiopia, 16 November 2011
- Most goals by both teams in a match: 14: v North Korea, 14 November 1963
- Most goals by both teams in first half: 7: v Mauritania, 27 December 2006
- Most goals by both teams in second half: 4: (3 times)
  - v Ghana, 16 November 2003
  - v Sudan, 18 December 2004
  - v Ethiopia, 16 November 2011
- Fewest goals by both teams in a match: 0: (11 times)
  - v Niger, 16 July 1980
  - v Uganda, 19 October 1986
  - v Djibouti, 19 November 2000
  - v Eritrea, 14 December 2001
  - v Ethiopia, 12 November 2011
  - v Djibouti, 7 December 2019
  - v Eritrea, 15 December 2019
  - v Guinea, 21 March 2025
  - v Oman, 26 November 2025
  - v Mauritania, 27 March 2026
  - v Mauritania, 31 March 2026
- Fastest goals: 9th minutes: Abdilahi Abdi, v Kenya, 26 November 1994
- Fastest goals by a opponent: 1st minutes: Mrisho Ngasa, v Tanzania, 1 December 2012
- Latest goals: 90+3rd minutes: Ali Abdelaziz, v Sudan, 21 December 2006
- Latest goals by a opponent: 90+5th minutes: Bazoumana Touré, v Ivory Coast, 29 September 2026
- Fastest 2 goals by a opponent: 1 minute: v Zambia, 3 December 2010
- Fastest 3 goals by a opponent: 3 minute: v Zambia, 3 December 2010
- Fastest 2 goals to start the match: 50th minute: v Djibouti, 1 December 1994
- Fastest 2 goals by a opponent to start the match: 4th minute: v Zambia, 4 December 2013
- Fastest 3 goals by a opponent to start the match: 15th minute: v Egypt, 12 November 1977

== Competitive record ==
=== FIFA World Cup ===
FIFA World Cup record									Qualification record					
Year	Round	Position	Pld	W	D*	L	GF	GA	Pld	W	D	L	GF	GA
1930 to 1958	Part of Italy & United Kingdom								Part of Italy & United Kingdom					
(Chile) 1962	Not a FIFA member								Not a FIFA member					
1966 to 1978	Did not enter								Did not enter					
(Spain) 1982	Did not qualify								2	0	2	0	1	1
1986 to 1998	Did not enter								Did not enter					
(South Korea) (Japan) 2002	Did not qualify								2	0	0	2	0	6
(Germany) 2006	Did not qualify								2	0	0	2	0	7
(South Africa) 2010	Did not qualify								1	0	0	1	0	1
(Brazil) 2014	Did not qualify								2	0	1	1	0	5
(Russia) 2018	Did not qualify								2	0	0	2	0	6
(Qatar) 2022	Did not qualify								2	1	0	1	2	3
(Canada) (Mexico) (United States) 2026	Did not qualify								10	0	1	9	3	20
(Morocco) (Portugal) (Spain) 2030	To be determined								To be determined					
(Saudi Arabia) 2034	To be determined								To be determined					
Total		0/15							23	1	4	18	6	49

=== Africa Cup of Nations ===
Africa Cup of Nations record									Qualification record					
Year	Round	Position	Pld	W	D	L	GF	GA	Pld	W	D	L	GF	GA
(Sudan) 1957	Part of Italy & UK								Part of Italy & UK					
(United Arab Republic) 1959	Part of Italy & UK								Part of Italy & UK					
(Ethiopia) 1962	Not affiliated to CAF								Not affiliated to CAF					
(Ghana) 1963	Not affiliated to CAF								Not affiliated to CAF					
(Tunisia) 1965	Not affiliated to CAF								Not affiliated to CAF					
(Ethiopia) 1968	Not affiliated to CAF								Not affiliated to CAF					
(Sudan) 1970	Withdrew								Withdrew					
(Egypt) 1974	Did not qualify								2	1	0	1	2	5
(Ethiopia) 1976	Did not qualify								2	1	0	1	1	2
(Ghana) 1978	Did not enter								Did not enter					
(Nigeria) 1980	Withdrew								Withdrew					
(Libya) 1982	Did not enter								Did not enter					
(Ivory Coast) 1984	Did not qualify								1	0	0	1	0	1
(Egypt) 1986	Did not qualify								2	1	0	1	1	1
(Morocco) 1988	Did not qualify								2	0	1	1	0	5
(Algeria) 1990	Did not enter								Did not enter					
(Senegal) 1992	Did not enter								Did not enter					
(Tunisia) 1994	Did not enter								Did not enter					
(South Africa) 1996	Did not enter								Did not enter					
(Burkina Faso) 1998	Did not enter								Did not enter					
(Ghana) (Nigeria) 2000	Did not enter								Did not enter					
(Mali) 2002	Did not enter								Did not enter					
(Tunisia) 2004	Did not enter								Did not enter					
(Egypt) 2006	Did not enter								Did not enter					
(Ghana) 2008	Did not enter								Did not enter					
(Angola) 2010	Did not enter								Did not enter					
(Equatorial Guinea) (Gabon) 2012	Did not enter								Did not enter					
(South Africa) 2013	Did not enter								Did not enter					
(Equatorial Guinea) 2015	Did not enter								Did not enter					
(Gabon) 2017	Did not enter								Did not enter					
(Egypt) 2019	Did not enter								Did not enter					
(Cameroon) 2021	Did not enter								Did not enter					
(Ivory Coast) 2023	Did not qualify								2	0	0	2	1	5
(Morocco) 2025	Did not qualify								2	0	0	2	2	5
(Kenya) (Tanzania) (Uganda) 2027	To be determined								To be determined					
Total		0/35							13	3	1	9	7	24

=== African Nations Championship ===
African Nations Championship record									Qualification record					
Year	Round	Position	Pld	W	D	L	GF	GA	Pld	W	D	L	GF	GA
(Ivory Coast) 2009	Did not enter								Did not enter					
(Sudan) 2011	Did not qualify								2	1	0	1	1	6
(South Africa) 2014	Did not enter								Did not enter					
(Rwanda) 2016	Did not enter								Did not enter					
(Morocco) 2018	Did not qualify								2	0	0	2	1	4
(Cameroon) 2020	Did not qualify								2	0	0	2	2	7
(Algeria) 2022	Did not qualify								2	0	0	2	1	3
Total		0/6							8	1	0	7	5	20

=== Olympic Games ===
Olympic Games record
Appearances: 0
Year	Round	Position	Pld	W	D	L	GF	GA
1896–1960	Part of Italy & England							
(Japan) 1964	Did not enter							
(Mexico) 1968	Did not enter							
(West Germany) 1972	Did not enter							
(Canada) 1976	Did not enter							
(Soviet Union) 1980	Did not enter							
(United States) 1984	Did not enter							
(South Korea) 1988	Did not enter							
(Spain) 1992	Did not qualify							
(United States) 1996	Did not enter							
(Australia) 2000	Did not enter							
(Greece) 2004	Did not qualify							
(China) 2008	Did not qualify							
(United Kingdom) 2012	Did not qualify							
(Brazil) 2016	Did not qualify							
(Japan) 2020	Did not qualify							
Total		0/26						

- Football at the Summer Olympics has been an under-23 tournament since the 1992 edition.

=== All-Africa Games ===
All-Africa Games record
Appearances: 0
Year	Round	Position	Pld	W	D	L	GF	GA
(Republic of the Congo) 1965	Did not enter							
(Nigeria) 1973	Did not qualify							
(Algeria) 1978	Did not qualify							
(Kenya) 1987	Did not enter							
(Egypt) 1991	Did not enter							
(Zimbabwe) 1995	Did not enter							
(South Africa) 1999	Did not enter							
(Nigeria) 2003	Did not enter							
(Algeria) 2007	Did not enter							
(Mozambique) 2011	Did not enter							
(Republic of the Congo) 2015	Did not enter							
(Morocco) 2019	Did not enter							
Total		0/11						

- Prior to the Cairo 1991 campaign, the Football at the All-Africa Games was open to full senior national teams.

=== CECAFA Cup ===
CECAFA Cup record
Appearances: 26
Year	Round	Position	Pld	W	D	L	GF	GA
(Uganda) 1973	Group stage	6th	2	0	0	2	2	12
(Tanzania) 1974	Group stage	5th	2	0	1	1	2	3
(Zambia) 1975	Did not enter							
1976	Group stage	7th	3	0	0	3	2	7
(Somalia) 1977	Group stage	5th	3	1	1	1	2	2
(Malawi) 1978	Group stage	5th	4	0	1	3	3	10
(Kenya) 1979	Did not enter							
(Sudan) 1980	Group stage	6th	2	0	1	1	1	3
(Tanzania) 1981	Did not enter							
(Uganda) 1982	Did not enter							
(Kenya) 1983	Group stage	7th	3	0	1	2	3	5
(Uganda) 1984	Group stage	5th	3	1	1	1	3	3
(Zimbabwe) 1985	Did not enter							
(Ethiopia) 1987	Did not enter							
(Malawi) 1988	Did not enter							
(Kenya) 1989	Did not enter							
1990	Did not enter							
(Uganda) 1991	Did not enter							
(Tanzania) 1992	Did not enter							
(Kenya) 1994	Group stage	5th	3	1	0	2	3	8
(Uganda) 1995	Group stage	8th	3	0	0	3	1	15
(Sudan) 1996	Did not enter							
(Rwanda) 1999	Group stage	12th	2	0	0	2	0	5
(Uganda) 2000	Group stage	9th	4	0	1	3	1	11
(Rwanda) 2001	Group stage	9th	3	0	1	2	0	6
(Tanzania) 2002	Group stage	8th	4	1	0	3	1	4
(Sudan) 2003	Did not enter							
(Ethiopia) 2004	Group stage	8th	3	0	0	3	0	7
(Rwanda) 2005	Group stage	7th	4	1	0	3	6	10
(Ethiopia) 2006	Group stage	10th	3	0	0	3	0	8
(Tanzania) 2007	Group stage	10th	3	0	0	3	0	6
(Uganda) 2008	Group stage	9th	4	1	0	3	1	9
(Kenya) 2009	Group stage	10th	3	0	0	3	1	6
(Tanzania) 2010	Group stage	12th	3	0	0	3	0	11
(Tanzania) 2011	Group stage	12th	3	0	0	3	1	11
(Uganda) 2012	Group stage	12th	3	0	0	3	1	13
(Kenya) 2013	Group stage	11th	3	0	0	3	0	7
(Ethiopia) 2014	Not held							
(Rwanda) 2015	Group stage	10th	3	0	0	3	0	9
(Kenya) 2017	Withdrew							
(Uganda) 2019	Group stage	5th	4	1	2	1	1	2
(Ethiopia) 2021	Did not enter							
Total	0 titles	26/42	80	7	10	63	35	193

=== FIFA Arab Cup ===
FIFA Arab Cup record									Qualification record					
Year	Round	Position	Pld	W	D	L	GF	GA	Pld	W	D	L	GF	GA
(Lebanon) 1963	Did not enter								Did not enter					
(Kuwait) 1964	Did not enter								Did not enter					
(Iraq) 1966	Did not enter								Did not enter					
(Saudi Arabia) 1985	Did not qualify								3	0	1	2	1+	2+
(Jordan) 1988	Did not enter								Did not enter					
(Syria) 1992	Did not enter								Did not enter					
(Qatar) 1998	Did not enter								Did not enter					
(Kuwait) 2002	Did not enter								Did not enter					
2009	Did not qualify ^{1}								3	0	0	3	3	18
(Saudi Arabia) 2012	Did not enter								Did not enter					
(Qatar) 2021	Did not qualify								1	0	0	1	1	2
(Qatar) 2025	Did not qualify								1	0	1	0	0	0
Total		0/9							8	0	2	6	5+	22+

^1 The 2009 edition was cancelled during qualification.

=== Arab Games ===
Arab Games record
Appearances: 1
Year	Round	Position	Pld	W	D	L	GF	GA
(Egypt) 1953	Part of Italy & England							
(Lebanon) 1957	Part of Italy & England							
(Morocco) 1961	Did not enter							
(United Arab Republic) 1965	Did not enter							
(Syria) 1976	Did not enter							
(Morocco) 1985	Group stage	7th	3	1	0	2	5	6
(Syria) 1992	Did not enter							
(Lebanon) 1997	Did not enter							
(Jordan) 1999	Did not enter							
(Algeria) 2004	Not held							
(Egypt) 2007	Did not enter							
(Qatar) 2011	Withdrew							
Total	Group stage	1/11	3	1	0	2	5	6

=== Minor tournaments ===
Minor tournaments record
Year	Round	Position	Pld	W	D	L	GF	GA
(Indonesia) 1963 GANEFO	Group stage	11th	2	0	0	2	0	23
(Ethiopia) 1969 Friendship Cup	Group stage	6th	2	0	0	2	1	14
Total	0 Titles		4	0	0	4	1	37

== See also ==
- Somali national beach soccer team
- Somali League
- Somali Cup
- Somali Football Federation
