= Hussein Ali Abdulle =

Somalian footballer and coach

Hussein Abdulle
Personal information
- Full name: Hussein Ali Abdulle
- Place of birth: Somalia
- Date of death: 9 May 2017
- Place of death: Mogadishu, Somalia

International career
| Years | Team | Apps | (Gls) |
| 1960s–1970s | Somalia | | |

Managerial career
- Somalia

Hussein Ali Abdulle (died 9 May 2017 in Mogadishu, Somalia) was a Somali football coach and former player.

== Biography ==
Representing the Ocean Stars in many international competitions and matches during the 1960s and 70s, Abdulle was seen as one of Somalia's most respected footballers of his time and went on to coach the national team.

He died on 9 May 2017 aged 71 after a long illness in his Mogadishu home and was interred afterwards.

FIFA President Gianni Infantino gave his commiserations in a letter to the Somali Football Federation two days after Abdulle's passing.
