= Mohamed Farayare =

Somali professional football manager

Personal information
- Full name: Mohamed Abdulla Farayare
- Place of birth: Somalia

Managerial career
- Years: Team
- 2010: Somalia
- 2013–2014: Somalia

Mohamed Abdulla Farayare is a Somali professional football manager.

== Career ==
In 2010 and 2013 he coached the Somalia national football team.
