= Said Abdi Haibeh =

Somali football manager and agent

Personal information
- Date of birth: June 1971 (age 55)

Managerial career
- Years: Team
- 2019–2021: Somalia

Said Abdi Haibeh (born June 1971; Somali: Siciid Cabdi Haybe) is a Somali football manager and football agent.

== Managerial career ==
In December 2019, following the resignation of Bashir Hayford due to the Somali Civil War, Haibeh was appointed manager of Somalia. In May 2021, Haibeh was replaced by Abdellatif Salef.

== Personal life ==
Haibeh also works as a football agent.
