= Alexandre Pesey =

French conservative activist

- Education: Panthéon-Assas University
- Occupations: Entrepreneur, political activist, school director

Alexandre Pesey is a French entrepreneur, conservative activist, and former journalist. In 2004, he co-founded the Institut de formation politique (IFP; "Institute for Political Training"), a private school in Paris that trains young right-wing people for careers in politics, the media, and advocacy. He has directed it since. CNN described the IFP in 2022 as a "finishing school" for right-leaning young people in France.

Pesey also founded the Tocqueville Fellowship, a yearly trip that introduces young French people to American conservative organizations, and the Institut libre de journalisme, a journalism program run by the IFP. In 2024, he invested in the École supérieure de journalisme de Paris and became its director of development.

== Early life and education ==
Pesey grew up in the Paris area and in Eure-et-Loir, southwest of Paris, where his mother ran a farm. In the mid-1990s, he studied law at Panthéon-Assas University in Paris and management at EM Lyon.

While studying law at Panthéon-Assas, Pesey was active in the Union Nationale Inter-universitaire (UNI), a conservative student union. It was there that he discovered Antonio Gramsci's idea that winning the cultural battle comes before winning political power. He has said that, as a student, he saw the left active in many more areas than the right, including culture and community groups, and he later built the IFP to train people for all of these fields, not only for elected office.

In 2000, at age 25, he went to the United States for an internship at the Leadership Institute, a training organization for conservative activists founded by Morton Blackwell. He stayed in the country until 2001, spending most of that time in Washington, D.C. He later said that in Washington he had seen how American think tanks applied business methods, such as communications, fundraising, and networking, to political debate.

In 2002, he wrote a master's thesis on the Heritage Foundation. The next year, he began a doctoral dissertation, supervised by the political scientist Hugues Portelli, comparing think tanks in Germany, Britain, and the United States.

== Career ==
=== Early career ===
While in Washington, Pesey worked for CNN. After returning to France, he worked as a television journalist, including at BFM and the public broadcaster France 3, and later taught political science. He has said he lectured at Panthéon-Assas for six years.

=== Tocqueville Fellowship ===
In 2003, Pesey founded the Tocqueville Fellowship (Bourse Tocqueville). Each year, it takes a small group of young French people to the United States to meet politicians, think tanks, and advocacy groups, most of them aligned with the Republican Party. According to the fellowship's website, its purpose is to study "new techniques of action, communication, and influence". The first fellow was Jean Martinez, a lawyer who later co-founded the IFP with Pesey. Early fellows also included Agnès Verdier-Molinié, who later became director of the free-market think tank iFRAP. In July 2024, that year's seven fellows attended the Republican National Convention in Milwaukee. Pesey runs the program with his wife, Kate, who is its director.

=== Institut de formation politique ===
Pesey founded the IFP in 2004 with Martinez and Thomas Millon, a Lyon businessman and the son of former French defense minister Charles Millon. He modeled it on the Leadership Institute. Pesey has said the school is funded mostly by private donations.

The IFP does not award degrees. Applicants must be under 30 and fill out a questionnaire, and classes are held on weeknights and weekends. In 2024, the school said it had trained 3,200 people. According to CNN, its alumni in 2022 included sitting French lawmakers. Former students include the politician Marion Maréchal and Stanislas Rigault, who founded the youth wing of the 2022 presidential campaign of Éric Zemmour. Zemmour has called the IFP the "counter-Sciences Po", a jab at the elite Paris university that trains much of France's political establishment. Maréchal later opened her own school in Lyon, modeled on the IFP.

In 2013, Le Monde described the IFP as a school for "liberal-conservatives", using "liberal" in its French, free-market sense. In 2017, the Catholic weekly La Vie called it a "breeding ground for liberal conservatives and identitarian Catholics". By 2024, Les Echos was calling it a school for young right-wing and far-right operatives. That year, Pesey said the IFP was independent of political parties and open to every faction of the right, from the center-right to Zemmour's party, Reconquête, and Marine Le Pen's National Rally. Two years earlier, he had told CNN that "on a scale from left to right, clearly, it's quite on the right." He has said he founded the IFP to unite what he calls the four strands of the French right: free-market liberals, nationalist opponents of European integration, conservatives, and identitarians.

The IFP also runs a series of Monday evening talks, the Lundis de l'IFP, whose speakers have included figures of the hard right. In 2019, Pesey took part in the Convention of the Right (Convention de la droite), a gathering of right-wing figures in Paris.

=== Institut libre de journalisme ===
In 2018, Pesey founded the Institut libre de journalisme (ILDJ), a branch of the IFP that offers journalism training over a series of weekends. About 200 students had attended by 2024, and Pesey said about 100 of them were working journalists.

=== ESJ Paris ===
In late 2024, a group of investors that included companies controlled by the French billionaires Vincent Bolloré, Bernard Arnault, and Rodolphe Saadé bought the École supérieure de journalisme de Paris (ESJ Paris). Pesey also invested in the school, which named him director of development in December 2024.

=== Ties to American conservatives ===
In 2025, Heritage Foundation staff contacted Pesey and his wife about a visit to France by the foundation's president, Kevin Roberts. During the trip, Roberts met Maréchal, Éric Ciotti, and Zemmour, and the IFP and the Tocqueville Fellowship hosted a reception for him in Paris.

== Personal life ==
Pesey is married to Kate Pesey, an American who once worked at the Leadership Institute. They have six children. In 2026, Politico Europe included the couple in its list of "21 power couples to watch" in French politics.
