= Nana Kofi Abuna V =

Paramount chief of Essipun

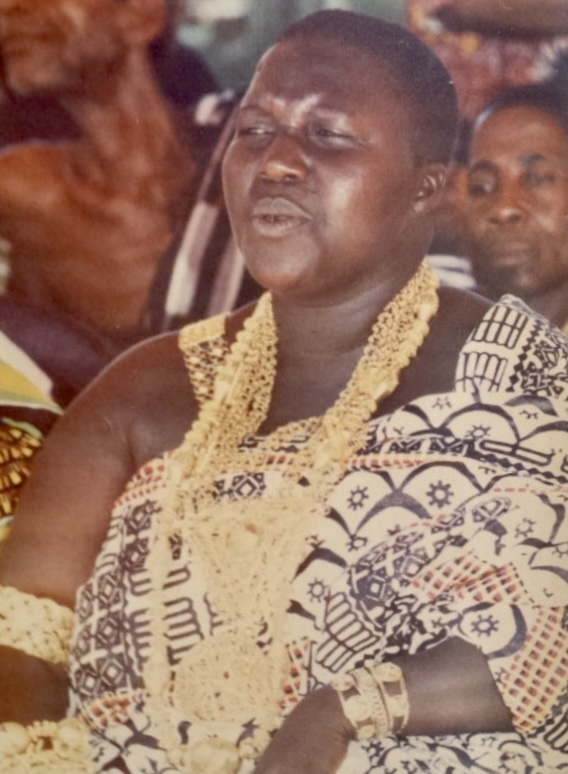
Nana Kofi Abuna V

Nana Kofi Abuna V is the Paramount chief of Essipun in the Western Region of Ghana.

She was born in Takoradi on August 31, 1959. She was named Maame Ama Azaa Nyinpanyin at birth, and was known in school as Emma Theodora Wood. She attended Ashley's Secretarial College.
