= Mustaf Yuusuf =

Somali footballer

Personal information
- Full name: Mustaf Mohamed Yuusuf
- Date of birth: 1 January 1998 (age 28)
- Place of birth: Burao, Somalia
- Height: 1.83 m (6 ft 0 in)
- Position: Goalkeeper

Team information
- Current team: IFK Berga

Senior career*
Years	Team	Apps	(Gls)
- Midnimo
2015–2018	Jeenyo United		
2019	Heegan		
2020	Nybro IF	9	(1)
2021–2023	Oskarshamns AIK	0	(0)
2023–	IFK Berga	23	(0)

International career^{‡}
2015–	Somalia	16	(0)
- * Club domestic league appearances and goals ‡ National team caps and goals as of 21 November 2023

Mustaf Mohamed Yuusuf (Somali: Mustaf Maxamed Yuusuf; born 1 January 1998) is a Somali footballer who plays as a goalkeeper for Lindsdals IF and the Somalia national team, and is often regarded as one of the greatest Somali goalkeepers of all time.

== Club career ==
Yuusuf began his career in Somalia, playing for Midnimo, Jeenyo United and Heegan. In 2020, Yuusuf moved to Sweden, signing for fifth tier club Nybro IF. In 2021, Yuusuf signed for Oskarshamns AIK.

== International career ==
On 9 October 2015, Yuusuf made his debut for Somalia, in a 2–0 World Cup qualification loss against Niger.
