= Julien Freund =

French sociologist and philosopher

- Born: 8 January 1921; Henridorff, Moselle, France
- Died: 10 September 1993 (aged 72); Colmar, France

Education
- Education: University of Strasbourg

Philosophical work
- Era: 20th-century philosophy
- Region: Western philosophy
- School: Continental philosophy French liberalism IR realism
- Main interests: Political philosophy
- Notable ideas: Mesocracy

Julien Freund (8 January 1921 – 10 September 1993) was a French philosopher and sociologist. Freund was called an "unsatisfied liberal-conservative" by Pierre-André Taguieff, for introducing France to the ideas of Max Weber. His work as a sociologist and political theorist is a continuation of Carl Schmitt's. Freund, like many people from Alsace, was fluent in German and French. His works have been translated into nearly 20 languages.

== Biography ==
Born in Henridorff (Moselle) on 8 January 1921, to a peasant mother and a socialist working class father, Freund was the eldest of six siblings. When his father died he had to end his studies. He became a teacher aged 17, and secretary to the council in his hometown.

His brother Antoine, conscripted against his will into the Wehrmacht, was injured in the battle of Orel in Russia and then deserted. This should have caused the deportation of his family, who were also aiding the resistance in Lorraine. However, they were able to destroy the Gestapo-held documents relating to their proposed deportation.

=== The resistance ===
During World War II, Freund was a member of the resistance. A member of the Libération group founded by Jean Cavaillès, he was taken hostage by the Germans in July 1940. He managed to escape to the Free Zone of France. In January 1941, he began fighting for the Libération movement of Emmanuel d’Astier de la Vigerie, then in combat groups run by Henri Frenay, all the while getting his degree in philosophy.

Arrested in June 1942 in Clermont-Ferrand, then again in September in Lyon, he was accused alongside Emmanuel Mounier in the trial of Combat. Jailed in the central prison of Elysses, then in the fortress of Sisteron, he escaped on 8 June 1944. Returning to Strasbourg in November 1944, he became a journalist and political activist.

=== Academic career ===
Initially, Freund was a young teacher in Hommarting (Moselle). He then became professor of philosophy in collège Mangin de Sarrebourg (1946–49), lycée Fabert de Metz (1949–53) and then the lycée Fustel de Coulanges de Strasbourg (1953–60). From 1960 to 1965, he was a head of research at CNRS. In 1965, the year of his thesis at Sorbonne, he was elected professor of sociology at the University of Strasbourg, where he founded the departement of social sciences. He then taught from 1973 to 1975 at the College of Europe in Bruges, then in 1975 at Université de Montréal.

== Ideas ==
Freund was a support of limited democracy and that growing democratisation increases the reach of government, allowing it to become ever more invasive. Politics, Freund believed, cannot solve any cultural problems or impose social values upon society, and it should not be involved in religious affairs. Equally, religion also cannot impose upon the principles of democracy. Freund's work also drew attention to the corruption of language and its misuse in democracy: "La démocratie se décompose quand elle dilapide la sincérité en démagogie et en flatterie", i.e. "Democracy breaks down when it squanders sincerity in demagoguery and flattery".

His idea of "mesocracy" was first used in 1978, against the overuse and overreach of democracy. Mesocracy from its Greek roots, is a form of power that exists in tandem with other 'counter powers'. Rather than speaking of a singular, abstract “freedom”, Freund preferred to refer to specific freedoms, freedom of the press, of association, of conscience etc. Without such concrete freedoms, Freund argued, we will never have freedom in the singular.

== Bibliography ==
- L’Essence du politique (Sirey, 1965; Dalloz, 2003, 870 p.).
- Sociologie de Max Weber (PUF, 1966 et 1983).
- Europa ohne Schminke (Drückerei Winkelhagen, Goslar 1967).
- Qu’est-ce que la politique ? (Seuil, 1968 et 1978).
- Max Weber (Collection « Sup-Philosophie » (PUF, 1969).
- Le Nouvel âge. Éléments pour la théorie de la démocratie et de la paix (Marcel Rivière, 1970).
- Le Droit d’aujourd’hui (PUF, 1972).
- Les Théories des sciences humaines (PUF, 1973).
- Pareto. La théorie de l’équilibre (Seghers, 1974).
- Georges Sorel. Eine geistige Biographie (Siemens-Stiftung, Munich 1977).
- Les Problèmes nouveaux posés à la politique de nos jours (Université européenne des affaires, 1977),
- Utopie et violence (Marcel Rivière, 1978).
- Il luogo della violenza (Cappelli, Bologna 1979).
- La Fin de la Renaissance (PUF, 1980).
- La crisis del Estado y otros estudios (Instituto de Ciencia política, Santiago de Chile 1982).
- Idées et expériences. Les activités sociales : regards d’un sociologue (Institut des Sciences Politiques et Sociales de l’U.C.L., Louvain-la-Neuve 1983).
- Sociologie du conflit (PUF, 1983).
- Idées et expériences (Institut de sociologie de l’UCL, Louvain-la-Neuve 1983).
- La Décadence. Histoire sociologique et philosophique d’une catégorie de l’expérience humaine (Sirey, 1984).
- Philosophie et sociologie (Cabay, Louvain-la-Neuve 1984).
- Politique et impolitique (Sirey, 1987).
- Philosophie philosophique (Découverte, 1990).
- Études sur Max Weber (Droz, Genève 1990).
- Essais de sociologie économique et politique (Faculté catholique Saint-Louis, Bruxelles 1990).
- L’Aventure du politique. Entretiens avec Charles Blanchet (Critérion, 1991).
- D’Auguste Comte à Max Weber (Economica, 1992).
- L’Essence de l’économique (Presses universitaires de Strasbourg, Strasbourg 1993).
- Diritto e Politica. Saggi di filosofia giuridica (Edizioni Scientifiche Italiane, Napoli 1994).
- Il Terzo, il nemico, il conflitto. Materiali per una teoria del Politico (Giuffrè, Milano 1995).
- Warfare in the modern world: a short but critical analysis (Plutarch Press, Washington D.C. 1996).
- Voci di teoria politica (Antonio Pellicani Editore, Roma, 2001).
- Vista de conjunto sobre la obra de Carl Schmitt (Struhart & Cía., Buenos Aires, 2002).
- Les Lettres de la vallée (non paru).
- Die Industrielle Konfliktgesellschaft (1977)
- Der Unauffindbare Friede (1964 Berlin pour le 75ème anniversaire de Carl Schmitt)
- Die Politik als Heillehre (1974)
- Die Demokratie und das Politische (Berlin 1967 288 pages)
- Die neue Bewertung des Krieges als Mittel der auswärtigen Politik nach 1870(1970)

=== Translations ===
- Max Weber, Le Savant et le Politique, Plon, Paris 1959.
- Max Weber, Essais sur la théorie de la science, Plon, Paris 1965, et Agora/Presses-Pocket, 1992.
- Max Weber, Économie et société, Plon, Paris 1971.
