= Ahmed Ali (Somali footballer) =

Somali footballer (born 1990)

Personal information
- Full name: Ahmed Ali Mohamed
- Date of birth: 23 October 1990 (age 36)
- Place of birth: Mogadishu, Somalia
- Position: Midfielder

Senior career*
Years	Team	Apps	(Gls)
2008–2010	Alphense Boys		(3)
2010–2011	Jong ADO Den Haag	9	(0)
2011–2013	De Jodan Boys	54	(3)
2013–2014	Northwich Victoria		
2014–2015	Rijnsburgse Boys	24	(2)
2015–2016	Sheffield		
2016	Bromsgrove Sporting		
2016–2017	Redditch United	10	(0)
2017	Bromsgrove Sporting	23	(4)
2018	Bromsgrove Sporting	3	(0)
2018	Halesowen Town	7	(1)
2018–2019	Redditch United	14	(4)
2019	Pearl FC		
2019–2022	Halesowen Town		
2023	Nantwich Town	19	(2)
2023–2024	Hednesford Town	7	(2)
2024	Atherton Collieries	8	(0)
2024–2025	Llandudno	9	(2)

International career^{‡}
2012–2022	Somalia	8	(0)
- * Club domestic league appearances and goals as of 19 July 2024 ‡ National team caps and goals as of 3 April 2022

Ahmed Ali Mohamed (Somali: Axmed Cali; born 23 October 1990) is a Somali footballer who plays as a midfielder. Ali also captains the Somalia national team.

== Early life ==
Ali was born in Somalia and lived since age five in Reeuwijk, where he grew up.

== Club career ==
Ali made his debut in 2010, for Alphense Boys. The next year, he moved to fellow amateur side CVV De Jodan Boys, where he combined football with his law studies.

Ali moved to England with his family in 2013, after his contract with Jodan Boys was dissolved. From October 2015 to February 2016, he played for Sheffield FC. He then played for Bromsgrove Sporting FC, which he exchanged for Redditch United FC in November 2016. In January 2017 he returned to Bromsgrove Sporting. In January 2018 he returned to the field at Bromsgrove Sporting. After the coach's resignation, Ali went to Halesowen Town FC in March 2018. In October 2018 Ali returned to Redditch United. In January 2019, he moved to Qatar. On 20 December 2019, Ahmed rejoined Southern League Division One Central side Halesowen Town. Ali made his second debut on 21 December 2019 in a home Southern League Division One Central fixture against Aylesbury United, and had a debut to remember scoring a brace in a 4–1 victory for Halesowen Town.

In August 2023, Ali joined Nantwich Town alongside his brother Mohamud, the second time the brothers would be playing alongside one another following a spell at Northwich Victoria. He joined Hednesford Town in December 2023, departing to join Atherton Collieries in March 2024, reuninting with his brother Mo.

In July 2024, Ali once again followed his brother Mo to a new club, Cymru North side Llandudno.

== International career ==
On 22 November 2012, Ali made his debut for the Somalia national team in a friendly match against Ugandan club SC Villa. Three days later, he played his first international match at the 2012 CECAFA Cup in a 1–5 loss to Burundi. He also played in that tournament against Sudan and Tanzania. On 5 September 2019, he captained the side in a 1–0 win against Zimbabwe, marking Somalia's first ever FIFA World Cup qualification victory.

== Personal life ==
His brother Mohamud Ali also plays for the national team.
