= Mohamud Ali (footballer) =

Somali footballer (born 1994)

Personal information
- Full name: Mohamud Ali Mohamed
- Date of birth: 8 July 1994 (age 32)
- Place of birth: Zeist, Netherlands
- Height: 1.84 m (6 ft 0 in)
- Position: Centre back

Team information
- Current team: Atherton Collieries

Youth career
- Alphense Boys
- ADO Den Haag

Senior career*
Years	Team	Apps	(Gls)
2012–2013	Alphense Boys	17	(0)
2014–2016	Northwich Victoria	54	(3)
2016–2017	Glossop North End	34	(0)
2016–2017	Mossley	29	(2)
2017–2018	Droylsden	30	(1)
2018–2020	Curzon Ashton	64	(3)
2020	Southport	11	(0)
2021–2023	Warrington Town	5	(0)
2023	Stalybridge Celtic	4	(0)
2023	Nantwich Town	10	(1)
2023–2024	Atherton Collieries	19	(0)
2024–2025	Llandudno	28	(0)
2025–2026	Rhyl 1879	16	(0)
2026–	Atherton Collieries		

International career
2015–	Somalia	8	(0)
- * Club domestic league appearances and goals as of 08:31, 11 August 2026 (UTC)

Mohamud Ali Mohamed (born 8 July 1994) is a professional footballer who plays as a centre back or defensive midfielder who plays for Atherton Collieries. Born in Holland, he represents the Somalia national team.

== Club career ==
Ali has spent most of his youth at the highly rated academy of Alphense Boys with a short spell at ADO Den Haag playing alongside Nathan Aké. Ali made his first team debut for Alphense Boys on the 15th of April 2012 aged 18 playing in the Hoofdklasse then the third tier. Ali moved to Manchester in 2013. In 2014 Ali joined Northwich Victoria. In December 2015 Ali played in the FA Cup 2nd Round Proper against League Two opposition Northampton Town featuring Dominic Calvert-Lewin. At the beginning of the 2016/2017 season Ali joined Glossop North End midway through the season he signed for Mossley where he spent 12 months. Ali spent the last few months of the 2017/2018 season at Droylsden FC. Ali joined Curzon Ashton in the summer of 2018.

In August 2021, Ali joined Warrington Town having impressed during his pre-season with the club. In just his fifth appearance for the club, a 2–2 draw with Buxton, he suffered a serious anterior cruciate ligament injury. Following the injury, a JustGiving page was set up to support the defender having been unable to work as a driving instructor, almost £1,600 being raised before the end of the year. He finally underwent his surgery in February 2022 and would be invited back to train with the club upon finishing his rehabilitation.

Following a successful injury rehabilitation period, Ali joined Stalybridge Celtic in March 2023. Alongside his brother Ahmed, he joined Nantwich Town in August 2023. In December 2023, he joined Atherton Collieries.

In July 2024, Ali signed for Cymru North club Llandudno.

In July 2025 he joined Rhyl 1879. He departed from the club in late August 2026.

In September 2026 he returned to former club, Atherton Collieries.

== International career ==
He has been capped by the Somalia national team. He made his international debut on the 13th of October 2015 in the World Cup qualifiers against Niger. On 5 September 2019, he played in a 1–0 win against Zimbabwe, marking Somalia's first ever FIFA World Cup qualification victory. and was named man of the match in the team's historic World Cup match against Zimbabwe in September 2019, when the country recorded their first win in 35 years of qualification matches.

== Personal life ==
Ali works as a driving instructor in Manchester, England. His brother Ahmed Ali also plays for the national team.
