= Essipong =

Essipong is a town in the Sekondi Takoradi Metropolis of the Western Region of Ghana. The town is the site for the 20,000-seat multi-sport complex, the Essipong Stadium which was opened in 2008.

Its paramount chief is Nana Kofi Abuna V.
