= Stanislas Rigault =

French politician (born 1999)

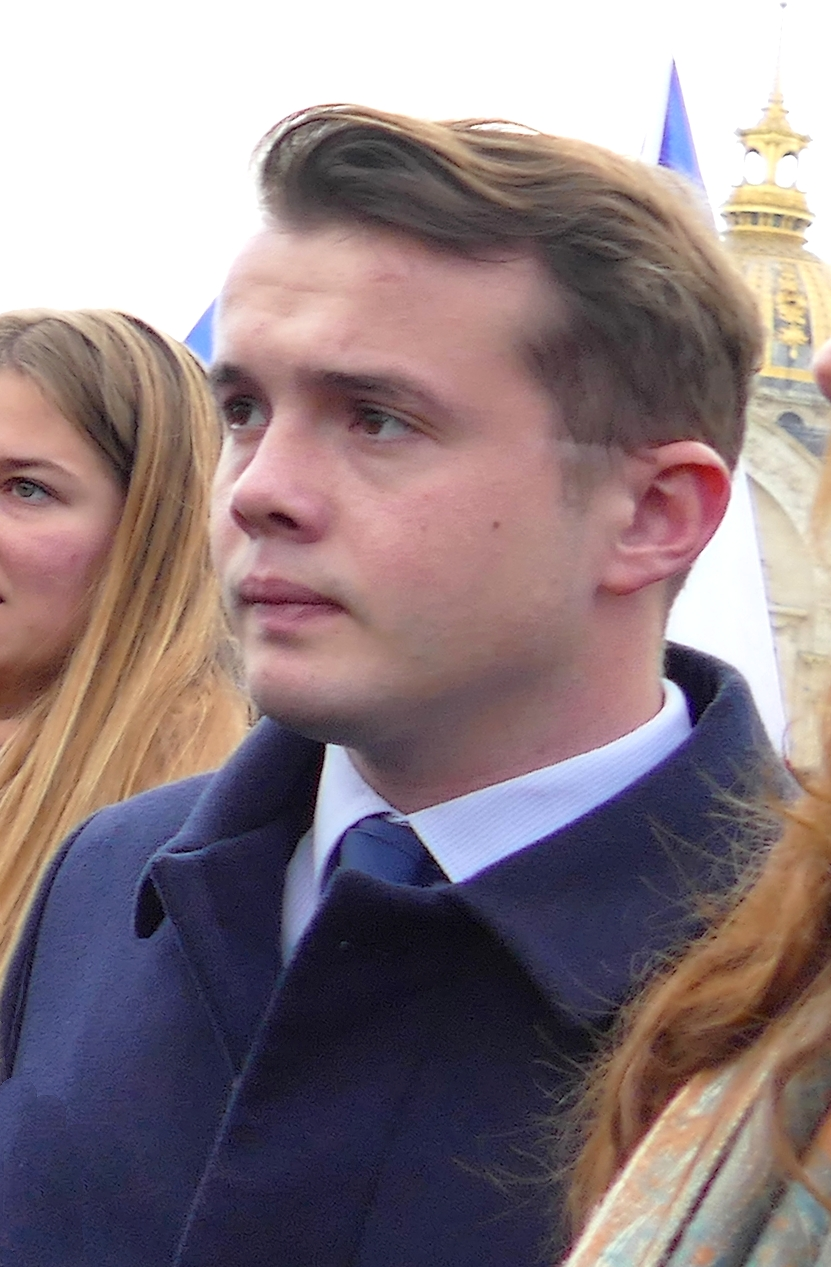
- Stanislas Rigault during a demonstration against anti-Semitism in 2023.

Spokesperson of Reconquête
- In office 5 December 2021 – 18 March 2025
- President: Eric Zemmour

Personal details
- Born: 16 May 1999 (age 27) Angers, France
- Party: Reconquête
- Education: Prytanée national militaire Institut catholique d'études supérieures
- Profession: Chargé de mission

Stanislas Rigault (born 16 May 1999 in Angers) is a French right-wing politician and activist. He is the founder and leader of Génération Z, the youth wing of Reconquête, the political party of Éric Zemmour, in which he is a spokesperson until March 2025.

== Life and career ==
Stanislas was born on 16 May 1999, he is the youngest of a family of four children. His father is an officer in the French Army and his mother is a health professional. He spent part of his childhood overseas France, where his father was stationed.

He completed his secondary education at the Prytanée national militaire, then he started a law degree at the Catholic University of Vendée.

In 2019, he co-founded L'Étudiant libre, a conservative monthly newspaper and blog aimed at students and young people.

Before the end of his studies, he is recruited as project manager by the Institut de formation politique, where he met the future campaign managers of the journalist Éric Zemmour for the 2022 presidential election. He met Zemmour for the first time in 2020 thanks to Sarah Knafo and became his assistant at CNews.

In February 2021, he created "Génération Z" to support the possible candidacy of Éric Zemmour to the 2022 presidential election, the organisation became later the official youth wing of the political party Reconquête.

He presented himself in the Vaucluse's 2nd constituency during 2022 legislative election. He was eliminated in the first round, obtaining 10.54% of the votes.

During the 2024 European election, he was sixth on the Reconquête list led by Marion Maréchal. However he wasn't elected as only the five first members of the list were elected.

In March 2025, he announced that he was leaving Reconquête and that his function as the president of "Génération Z" would be given to Hilaire Bouyé.
