= Patrick Egan =

Patrick Egan may refer to:

- Patrick Egan (activist) (1841–1919), Irish Fenian, Land Leaguer, and later US ambassador to Chile
- Pat Egan (1918–2008), Canadian ice hockey player
- Patrick Egan (Irish politician) (died 1960), Irish Cumann na nGaedhael politician
