= Henridorff =

- Commune
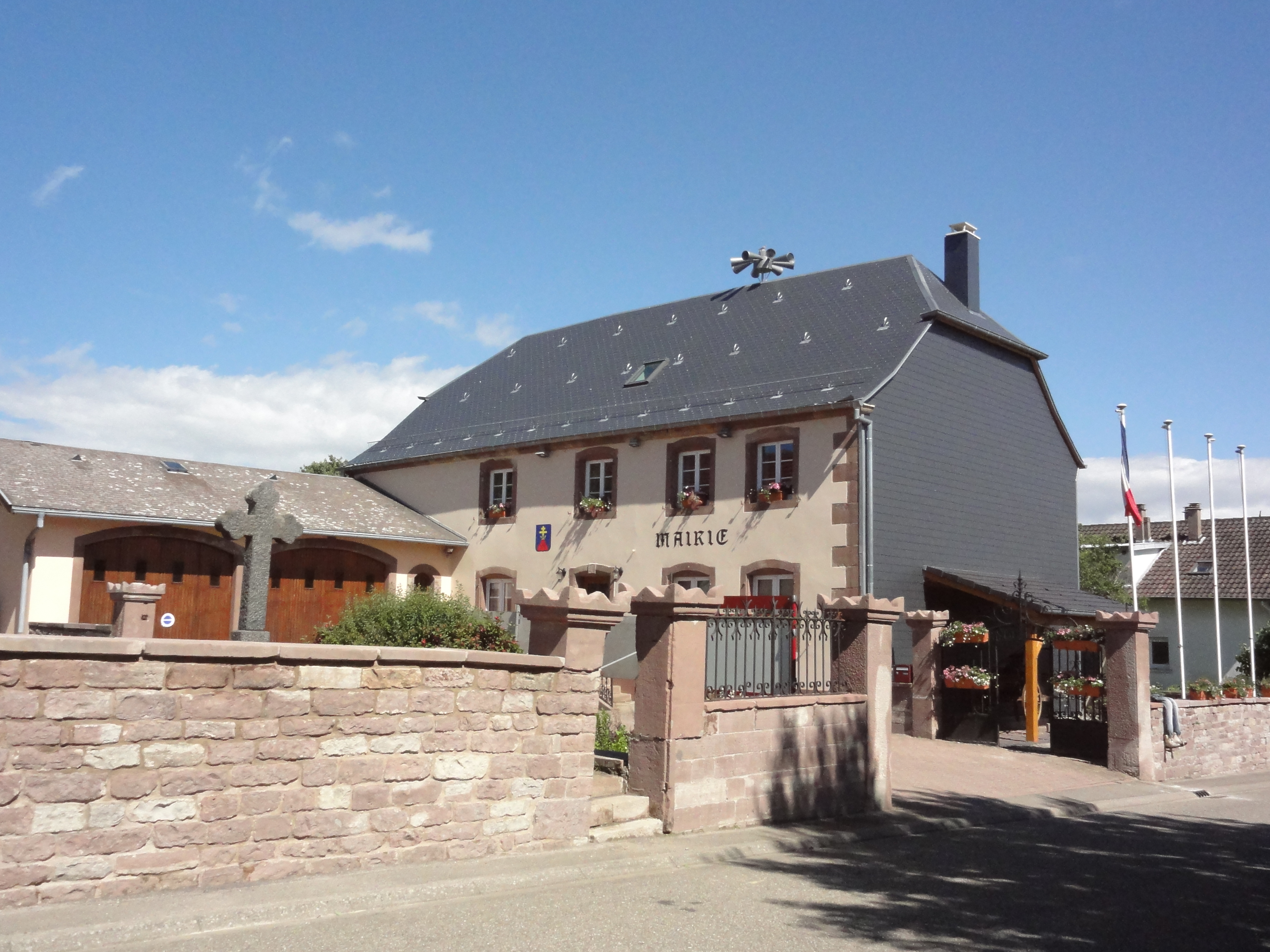
- The town hall in Henridorff

- Coat of arms
- Location of Henridorff
- Location within France Location within Grand Est
- Coordinates: 48°44′03″N 7°12′40″E
- Country: France
- Region: Grand Est
- Department: Moselle
- Arrondissement: Sarrebourg-Château-Salins
- Canton: Phalsbourg
- Intercommunality: CC du Pays de Phalsbourg

Government
  - Mayor (2020–2026): Bernard Kalch
- Area^{1}: 7.31 km^{2} (2.82 sq mi)
- Elevation: 366 m (1,201 ft)
- Highest elevation: 367 m (1,204 ft)
- Lowest elevation: 215 m (705 ft)
- Population (2023): 706
  - Density: 96.6/km^{2} (250/sq mi)
- Time zone: UTC+01:00 (CET)
  - Summer (DST): UTC+02:00 (CEST)
- INSEE/Postal code: 57315 /57820
- ^{1} French Land Register data, which excludes lakes, ponds, glaciers > 1 km^{2} (0.386 sq mi or 247 acres) and river estuaries.

Henridorff (French pronunciation: [ɑ̃ʁidɔʁf]; German: Heinrichsdorf) is a commune in the Moselle department in Grand Est in north-eastern France.

== Geography ==
The village is located 3 km south of the national road 4, north of the valley of the Zorn. The pass of Henridorff, the "Steig", with a slope of 6% connects the valley to the village.

The village is surrounded by forests of broad-leaved trees (mainly beech) and conifers.

The geological base is formed of Vosges sandstone or red sandstone. Also numerous quarries from which sandstone was extracted are located near the village.

== History ==
In 1614, Duke Henry II of Lorraine had the Schwangen woods cleared to build the village of Henridorff for the Catholics expelled from the territory of the Prince Palatine.

== See also ==
- Communes of the Moselle department
