= Chantal Delsol =

French philosopher (born 1947)

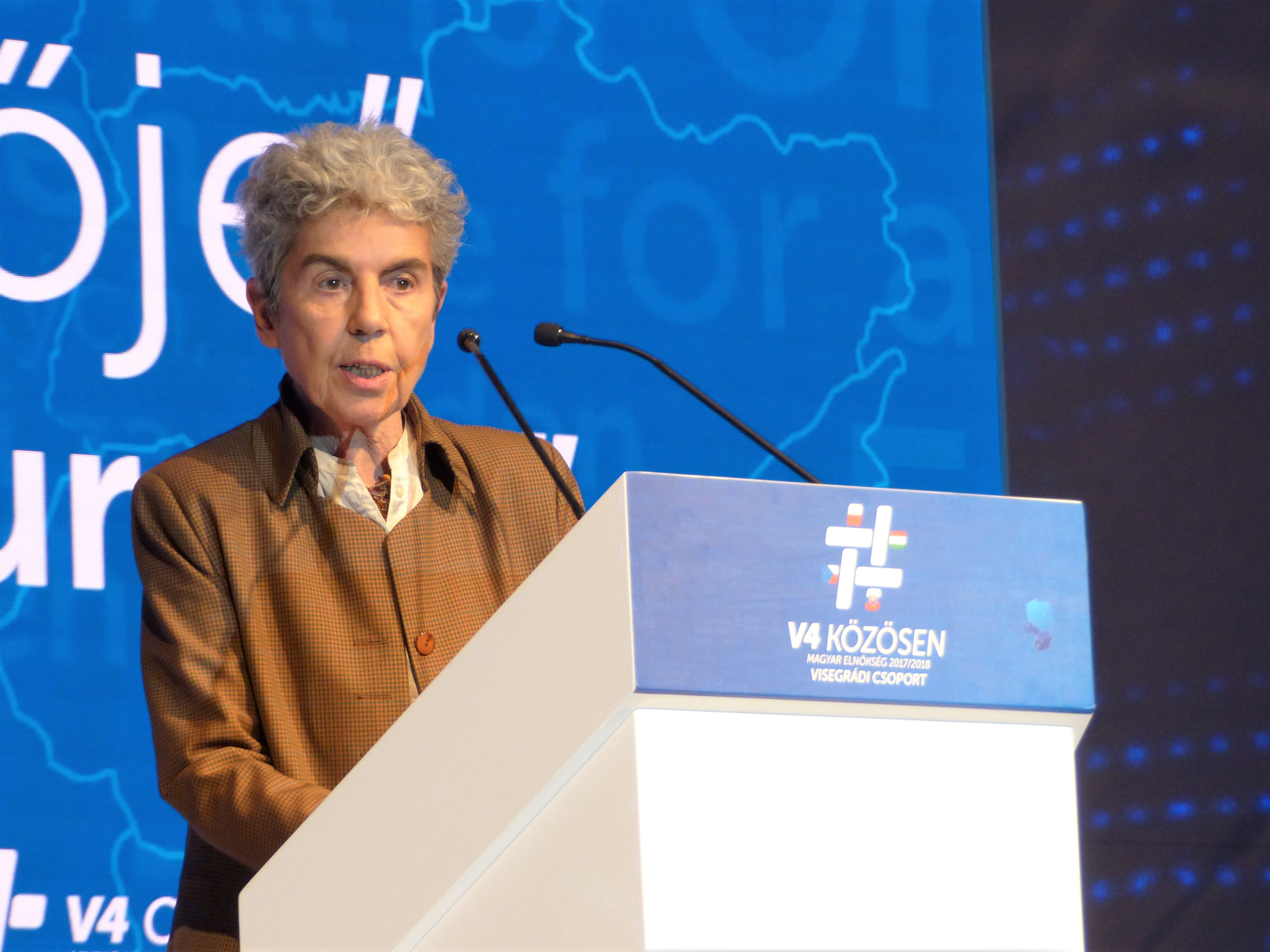
Chantal Delsol in Budapest in 2018

Chantal Delsol (also Chantal Millon-Delsol; born 16 April 1947) is a French philosopher, political historian and novelist. The founder of the Hannah Arendt research institute, founded in 1993, her work is inspired by Julien Freund and Pierre Boutang, as well as by her Catholic faith.

Her main political ideals are centered upon liberalism, federalism, as well as the principle of subsidiarity based on the idea of singularity.

== Biography ==
Chantal Delsol was born into a right-wing Catholic Parisian family, the daughter of biologist Michel Delsol. She studied under the liberal-conservative sociologist Julien Freund, a disciple of Max Weber. She earned her docteur ès lettres under him in 1982.

She is currently a professor at Université de Marne-la-Vallée, where she directs the centre for European studies, known as the Hannah Arendt Institute, which she founded in 1993.

== Political and philosophical thought ==
Delsol has described herself as a liberal-conservative.

=== A eulogy for federalism and Europe ===
Chantal Delsol is a strong supporter of European federalism, an Idea she traces to Catholicism and the baroque culture of Germanic countries. As such, she opposes Jean Bodin's idea of the nation state, which she believes results in geopolitical deadlock. A federation, she argues, is an indeterminate contract based on the common goal of peace and prosperity, offering a greater degree of flexibility and thus a more fluid and open state.

She considers the current European Union not to be a true federation. Due to the lack of political unity in the EU, the only unity is an administrative unity, which she has described as technocratic. For example, Europe lacks a common policy in terms of defence and foreign affairs.

=== Principle of subsidiarity ===
For Delsol, subsidiarity is a principle of social organization, allowing for the separation of powers to different authorities. An authority responsible for a group is required to guarantee the existence of the object of the group. The authority is only required to help the group overcome its weaknesses, no more and no less.

=== Populism ===
In her book titled La nature du populisme ou les figures de l'idiot !, Chantal Delsol examines the stakes of contemporary populism, i.e. the current resurgence of interest in the concept as well as the need to reevaluate our place in the contemporary world. To Delsol populism appears to be the greatest danger to democracy; on the other hand, it reveals the flaws of western democracies owing to their ideas of universalism.
