= Abdellatif Salef =

Moroccan football manager

Managerial career
- Years: Team
- 2012: Bleid-Gaume
- 2021: Somalia

Abdellatif Salef is a Moroccan football manager, who was most recently manager of Somalia.

== Managerial career ==
In October 2012, Salef replaced Michel De Wolf as manager of Belgian club Bleid-Gaume, before being replaced by De Wolf as manager just a month later.

On 26 May 2021, the Somali Football Federation announced the appointment of Salef as manager of Somalia on a two-year contract. On 15 June 2021, hours before Somalia were due to play Djibouti in a friendly, Salef was sacked from his position after less than three weeks, with the Somali Football Federation labelling him “incompetent” and “undisciplined”.
