= Rémi Brague =

French historian of philosophy (born 1947)

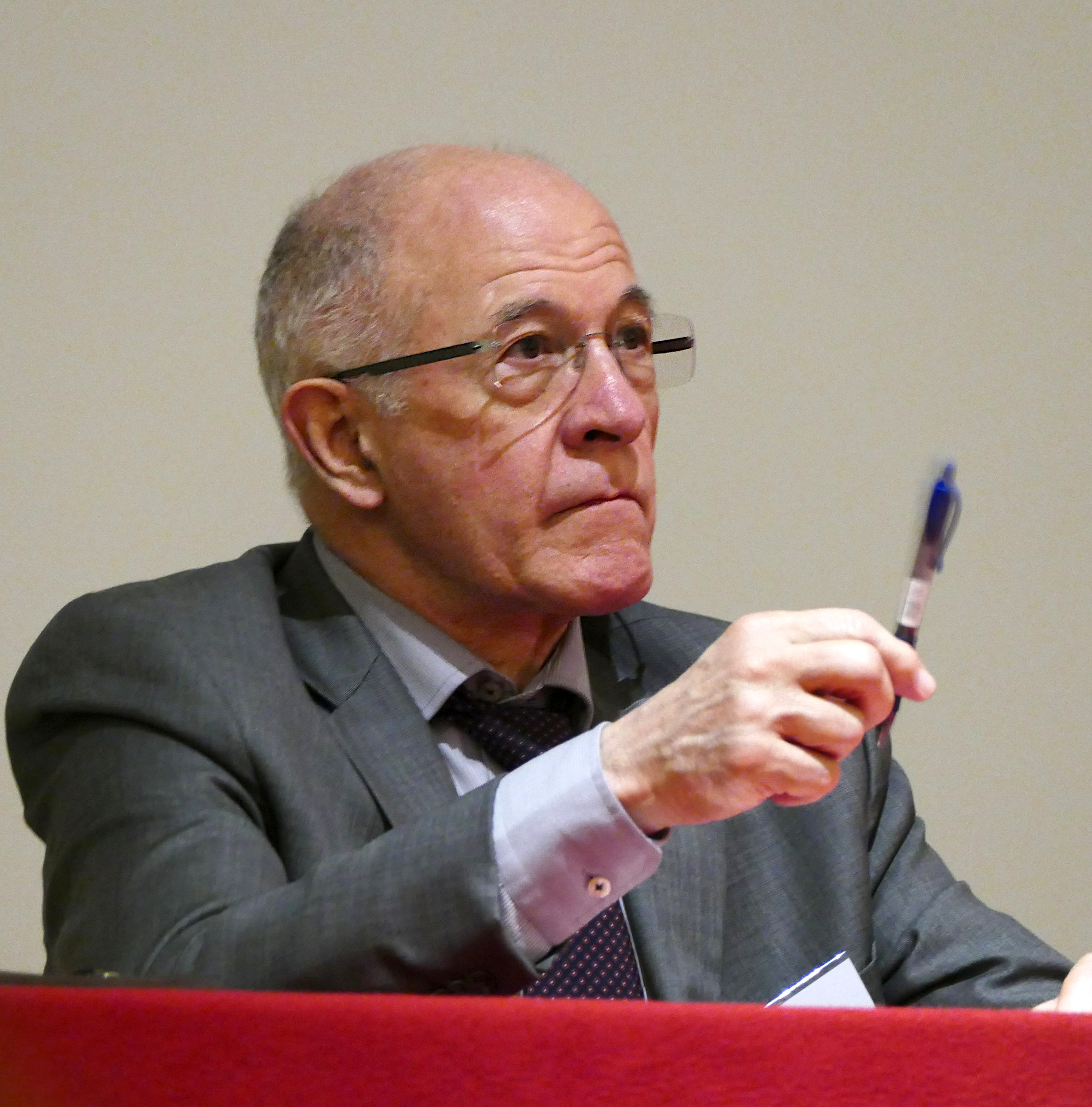
- Brague in 2017
- Born: 8 September 1947 (age 79); Paris, France

Philosophical work
- Region: Western Philosophy
- School: Continental philosophy Phenomenology
- Main interests: History of philosophy; Metaphysics; Cosmology; Political philosophy; Philosophy of religion; Philosophy of law; Western civilization; Aristotelianism; Secularity; Medieval Islamic philosophy; Medieval Jewish philosophy; Medieval Christianity
- Notable ideas: The centrality of Romanitas to Western Civilization; The secularism/secularity distinction

Rémi Brague (born 8 September 1947) is a French historian of philosophy specializing in Islamic, Jewish, and Christian thought of the Middle Ages. He is professor emeritus of Arabic and religious philosophy at the Sorbonne and Romano Guardini chair of philosophy (emeritus) at LMU Munich.

== Biography ==
Educated primarily at the École Normale Supérieure in Paris, Brague began his career as a student of Greek philosophy, interpreted in a distinctly modern key. His doctoral thesis, later published as Aristote et la question du monde: Essai sur le contexte cosmologique et anthropologique de l'ontologie (1988), developed a phenomenological account of Aristotle's world conception. In particular, his goal was to write the book on Aristotle that Heidegger would have written had he not written Being and Time. From there, he was led to study Hebrew to read the Old Testament and Arabic in order "to read the Jewish philosopher Maimonides' The Guide for the Perplexed in its original language." Since then, most of his work has occurred at the intersection of the three Abrahamic religions as they developed out of the ancient world, formed themselves in dialogue, and eventually gave rise to modernity.

He has written numerous books on classical and medieval intellectual history, religion, national identity, literature, and law. He is perhaps best known in the English-speaking world for his book Europe, la voie romaine (1992), translated into English as Eccentric Culture: A Theory of Western Civilization (2009). His masterwork thus far is his trilogy on the philosophical development of law in the West, La Sagesse du monde: Histoire de l'expérience humaine de l'univers (1999), La Loi de Dieu. Histoire philosophique d’une alliance (2005), and Le Règne de l'homme: Genèse et échec du projet moderne (2015). They have been translated into English as The Wisdom of the World: The Human Experience of the Universe in Western Thought (2004), The Law of God: The Philosophical History of an Idea (2007), and The Kingdom of Man: Genesis and Failure of the Modern Project (2018).

While his intellectual influences are various, Brague has developed some of the chief points of his unique account of Western intellectual history in dialogue with the political theorist Leo Strauss. Brague has said, "Leo Strauss taught me that when reading a text, you must be open to the possibility that it contains different layers of meaning. All philosophical books written before the Enlightenment aim at both a wider audience and a small elite, able to understand the deeper meaning of the texts." This approach informed Brague's understanding of Maimonides and the medieval Muslim philosopher Al-Farabi, among others. Still, he declared himself unconvinced "that it applies to the Greek philosophers" in the way Strauss has taught. Brague holds that "Strauss became so convinced of his way of interpreting texts, that he came to apply it to all sorts of books, even Cervantes' Don Quixote. Strauss taught me to read very carefully. But I don't consider myself a Straussian, nor do the real Straussians consider me one of them." Arguably, Brague's "Roman" view of Western Intellectual History (as enunciated in Eccentric Culture) responds to Strauss's famous emphasis on the longstanding tension between Athens and Jerusalem. For Brague, we cannot understand this tension fully without considering the historic mediation of Athens and Jerusalem through Rome. Likewise, Brague's account of Divine Law in the Western intellectual tradition (as presented in The Law of God) reframes the relationship between faith and reason, the secular and the sacred, in response to Strauss's recurrent emphasis on "the Theological-Political Problem."

Brague has received numerous awards, including honors from the French National Centre for Scientific Research and the Academy of Moral and Political Science. In 2009, he received the Josef Pieper Prize and the Grand prix de philosophie de l'Académie française, and was awarded the 2012 Ratzinger Prize for Theology alongside Brian E. Daley. In 2013, he was named a Chevalier de l'Ordre National de la Légion d'honneur.

== Works ==
Books and Edited Volumes in French (and other languages):

- Sur la religion. Paris: Flammarion, 2018.
- with E. Grimi, Contro il cristianismo e l'umanismo. Il perdono dell'Occidente. Siena: Cantagalli, 2015.
- Le Règne de l'homme: Genèse et échec du projet moderne. Paris: Gallimard, 2015.
- Modérément moderne: Le Temps Modernes ou l'invention d'une supercherie. Paris: Flammarion, 2014.
- Le Propre de l'homme. Sur une légitimité menacée. Paris: Flammarion, 2013.
- Les Ancres dans le ciel: L'infrastructure métaphysique. Paris: Seuil, 2011.
- Du Dieu des chrétiens et d'un ou deux autres, Paris: Flammarion, 2008.
- Image vagabonde: Essai sur l'imaginaire baudelairien. Chatou: Éditions de la Transparence, 2008.
- Au moyen du Moyen Age: Philosophies médiévales en chrétienté, judaïsme et islam. Chatou: Éditions de la Transparence, 2006.
- La Loi de Dieu. Histoire philosophique d’une alliance. Paris: Gallimard, 2005.
- Introduction au monde grec: Études d'histoire de la philosophie. Chatou: Éditions de la Transparence, 2005.
- La Sagesse du monde: Histoire de l'expérience humaine de l'univers. Paris: Fayard, 1999.
- (ed.) Saint Bernard et la philosophie. Paris: Presses Universitaires de France, 1993.
- Europe, la voie romaine. Paris: Criterion, 1992.
- (ed.) Herméneutique et ontologie: mélanges en hommage à Pierre Aubenque, phronimos anēr. Paris: Presses Universitaires de France, 1990.
- Aristote et la question du monde: Essai sur le contexte cosmologique et anthropologique de l'ontologie. 1988. Paris: P.U.F., 2001.
- Du temps chez Platon et Aristote: quatre études. 1982. Paris: Presses Universitaires de France, 1995.
- Le Restant. Supplément aux commentaires du Ménon. 1978. Paris: Vrin/Les Belles Lettres, 1999.

Books in English:

- Curing Mad Truths: Medieval Wisdom for the Modern Age. Notre Dame: U of Notre Dame P, 2019. ISBN 978-0268105693
- The Kingdom of Man: Genesis and Failure of the Modern Project. Trans. Paul Seaton. Notre Dame: U of Notre Dame P, 2018. ISBN 978-0268104252
- Moderately Modern. Trans. Paul Seaton. Notre Dame: St. Augustine's P, 2018. ISBN 978-1587315183
- Anchors in the Heavens: The Metaphysical Infrastructure of Human Life. Trans. Brian Lapsa. Notre Dame: St. Augustine's P, 2018. ISBN 978-1587310409
- The Legitimacy of the Human. Trans. Paul Seaton. Notre Dame: St. Augustine's P, 2017. ISBN 978-1587314605
- On the God of the Christians (and On One or Two Others). Trans. Paul Seaton. Notre Dame: St. Augustine's P, 2013. ISBN 978-1587313455
- Legend of the Middle Ages: Philosophical Explorations of Medieval Christianity, Judaism, and Islam. Trans. Lydia G. Cochrane. Chicago: U of Chicago P, 2009. ISBN 978-0-226-07080-3
- Eccentric Culture: A Theory of Western Civilization. Trans. Samuel Lester. Notre Dame: St. Augustine's P, 2009. ISBN 978-1587312151
- Law of God: The Philosophical History of an Idea. Trans. Lydia G. Cochrane. Chicago: U of Chicago P, 2008. ISBN 978-0-226-07079-7
- The Wisdom of the World: The Human Experience of the Universe in Western Thought. Trans. Theresa Fagan. Chicago: U of Chicago P, 2004 ISBN 978-0-226-07077-3

Articles in English:

- "God as a Gentleman." First Things. (February, 2019).
- "The Failure of the Modern Project." The Modern Turn. Ed. Michael Rohlf. Washington, D.C.: Catholic University of America Press, 2017. 291–306.
- "Culture as a By-Product." Cooperatores Veritatis. Scritti in onore del Papa emerito Benedetto XVI per il 90° compleanno. Rome: Libreria Editrice Vaticana, 2017. 297–317.
- "God and Freedom. Biblical Roots of the Western Idea of Liberty." Christianity and Freedom, Volume 1: Historical Perspectives. Eds. T. S. Shah & A. D. Hertzke. Cambridge; Cambridge University Press, 2017. 391–402.
- "From What is Left Over." First Things. (August, 2017) 1–13.
- "Diversity: How Far?" Justice Through Diversity?: A Philosophical and Theological Debate. Ed. M. Sweeney. Lanham, MD: Rowman & Littlefield, 2016. 159–174.
- "On the Need for a Philosophy of Nature and on Aquinas’ Help in Sketching One." Proceedings of the American Catholic Philosophical Association. 89 (2015) 35–43.
- "Five challenges to European Democracies." After the Storm. How to Save Democracy in Europe. Eds. L. van Middelaar & Ph. Van Parijs Tielt, Belgium: Lannoo, 2015. 43–52.
- "Eclipse of God, Eclipse of Man." Tr. N. Sachot. The European Conservative. (Winter, 2015) 39–44.
- "Treason or Tradition?" Tradition as the Future of Innovation. Ed. Elisa Grimi. Newcastle upon Tyne: Cambridge Scholars, 2015. 96–110.
- "The Concept of the Abrahamic Religions, Problems and Pitfalls." The Oxford Handbook of the Abrahamic Religions. Eds. Adam Silverstein, Guy Stroumsa, & Moshe Blidstein. Oxford: Oxford UP, 2015. 88–108.
- "Are There as Many Gods as Religions?" Modern Age. 57.3 (Summer 2015) 78–84.
- "The Necessity of the Good." First Things. (February 2015) 47–52.
- "Epilogue: Camus and Christianity." In Albert Camus, Christian Metaphysics and Neoplatonism. Trans. Ronald Srigley. Notre Dame: St. Augustine's P, 2015. 134–139. ISBN 978-1587311147
- “On Aristotle’s Formula ὅ pote ὄn: Physics IV. 11, 14." tr. E. R. Jimenez. The Bloomsbury Companion to Aristotle. Ed. C. Baracchi. London: Bloomsbury, 2013. 75–88.
- "Natural Law in Islam.” Human Rights and Natural Law: An Intercultural Philosophical Perspective. Ed. Walter Schweidler. Sankt Augustin: Academia-Verlag, 2013. 251–265.
- "The Impossibility of Secular Society." First Things. (October 2013).
- "Athens – Jerusalem – Rome." Communio. 40.1 (Spring 2013)
- "Sin no more. Liberty, the West, and the Judeo-Christian Heritage." The American Spectator. 41.4 (May 2008) 28–35.
- "Natural Law and Divine Law." Communio. 35.3 (Fall 2008) 504–513.
- "Jew, Greek and Christian. Some Reflections on the Pauline Revolution." Expositions. Interdisciplinary Studies in the Humanities. 1.1 (March 2007) 15–28.
- "Are Non Theocratic Regimes Possible?" The Intercollegiate Review. 41.1 (Spring 2006) 3–12.
- "Is there such a thing as Eurocentrism?" Europe and Asia Beyond East and West. Ed. G. Delanty. London: Routledge, 2006. 257–268.
- "The deadly idea that will define the 21st century." The Catholic Herald (June 23, 2006) 10.
- "Christianity: a Fact in History." A Generative Thought: An Introduction to the Works of Luigi Giussani. Ed. E. Buzzi. Montreal: McGill-Queen's University Press, 2003. 34–39.
- "Wasted Time?" Communio. 30.1 (Spring 2003) 70–78.
- "How to Be in the World: Gnosis, Religion, Philosophy." Martin Buber: A Contemporary Perspective. Ed. Paul R. Mendes-Flohr. Syracuse: Syracuse University Press, 2002. 133–147.
- "Facing Reality." Courage. Ed. B. Darling-Smith. South Bend, IN" U of Notre Dame P, 2002. 43–53.
- "History of Philosophy as Freedom." Epoché. 7.1 (Fall 2002) 39–50.
- "Is Physics Interesting? Some Late Ancient and Medieval Answers." Graduate Faculty Philosophy Journal. 23.2 (2002) 183–201.
- "Is European Culture 'a Tale of Two Cities'?". Historical, Cultural, Socio-political, and Economic Perspectives on Europe. Ed. Suzanne Stern-Gillet and M. Teresa Lunati. Lewiston, NY: Edwin Mellen, 2000. 33–50.
- "The Conditions Under Which We May Have a Future." Communio. 27.3 (Fall 2000) 549–561.
- "The Angst of Reason." Faith and Reason. Ed. T.L. Smith. South Bend, IN: Saint Augustine's P, 1999. 235–244.
- " Athens, Jerusalem, Mecca: Leo Strauss's 'Muslim' Understanding of Greek Philosophy." Poetics Today. 19.2 (Summer 1998) 235–259.
- "Are we at Home in the World?" The Longing for Home. Ed. L. Rouner. U of Notre Dame P, 1997. 95–111.
- "Cosmological Mysticism: The Imitation of the Heavenly Bodies in Ibn Tufayl's Hayy ibn Yaqzan." Graduate Faculty Philosophy Journal. 19.2 / 20.1 (1997) 91–102.
- "Geocentrism as a Humiliation for Man." Medieval Encounters. 3.3 (1997) 187–210.
- "A Medieval Model of Subjectivity: Toward a Rediscovery of Fleshliness." The Ancients and the Moderns. Ed. R. Lilly. Bloomington: Indiana UP, 1996. 230–247.
- "The Impotence of the Word: The God Who Has Said It All." Diogenes. 170 (1995) 43–68.
- "Christ, Culture & the New Europe." First Things. (August 1992).
- "Leo Strauss and Maimonides." Leo Strauss's Thought: Towards a Critical Engagement. Ed. Alan Udoff. Boulder, CO: Lynne Rienner Publishers, 1991. 93–114.
- "Aristotle's Definition of Motion and Its Ontological Implications." Graduate Faculty Philosophy Journal. 13.2 (1990) 1–22.
- "The soul of salvation." Communio. 14.3 (Fall 1987).
- "The Body of the Speech: A New Hypothesis on the Compositional Structure of Timaeus's Monologue." Platonic Investigations. Ed. D.J. O'Meara. Washington, D.C.: Catholic UP, 1985. 53–83.
- "On the Christian Model of Unity: The Trinity." Communio 10 (1983): 149–166.
- "Radical Modernity and the Roots of Ancient Thought." Independent Journal of Philosophy. 4 (1983) 63–74.
