= Naima El Bezaz =

Moroccan-Dutch writer (1974–2020)

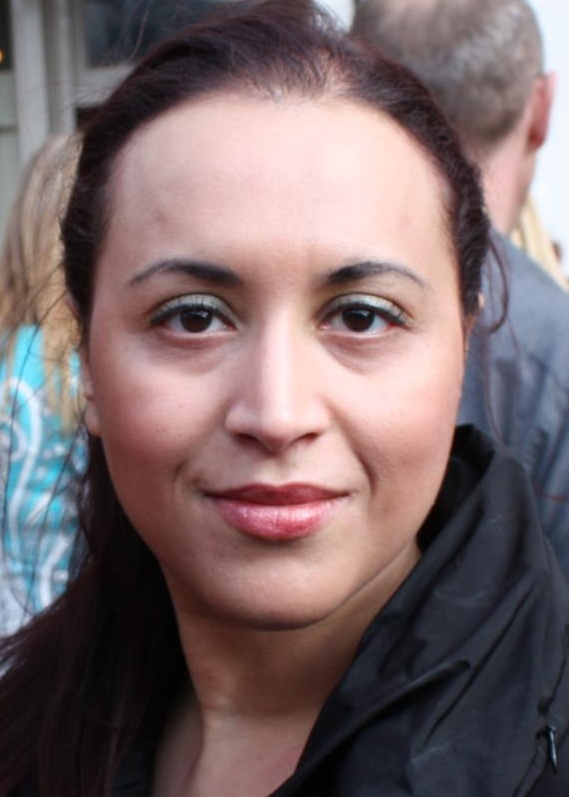
- Naima El Bezaz
- Born: 3 March 1974; Meknes, Morocco
- Died: 7 August 2020 (aged 46); Alphen aan den Rijn
- Occupation: Writer

Naima El Bezaz (3 March 1974 – 7 August 2020) was a Moroccan-Dutch writer, who also gave lectures and wrote stories, essays and columns.

== Biography ==
El Bezaz was born in Meknes, Morocco, and immigrated to the Netherlands with her family when she was four years old. After finishing high school she went to college, but quit to start a career in writing.

At a lecture, she met author Yvonne Kroonenberg, who got her into contact with the publisher Uitgeverij Contact, resulting in her first book, De weg naar het noorden. This title was published in 1995 and she received the "Jenny Smelik-IBBY-prijs", an award for authors of children's or youth literature focusing on minority children in the Netherlands. The novel became very popular among Dutch youth. In 2002 her second book was published, Minnares van de duivel, a collection of short stories which became a bestseller. On the television show Kopspijkers she read a sexually explicit passage of her book, angering Muslims and Christians. In September 2006, her third and most controversial book appeared, De verstotene, which contains explicit content and criticism of religious dogmatism. Uitgeverij Contact called it "The Moroccan-Dutch Turks Fruit", referring to the famous taboo-breaking Jan Wolkers novel.

El Bezaz struggled with depression for many years. She took her own life on 7 August 2020.

== Works ==
- De weg naar het noorden (1995)
- Minnares van de duivel (1999)
- De verstotene (2006)
- Het gelukssyndroom (2008)
- Vinexvrouwen (2010)
- Méér Vinexvrouwen (2012)
- In dienst van de duivel (2013)
