= Andreas Kinneging =

Dutch philosopher (born 1962)

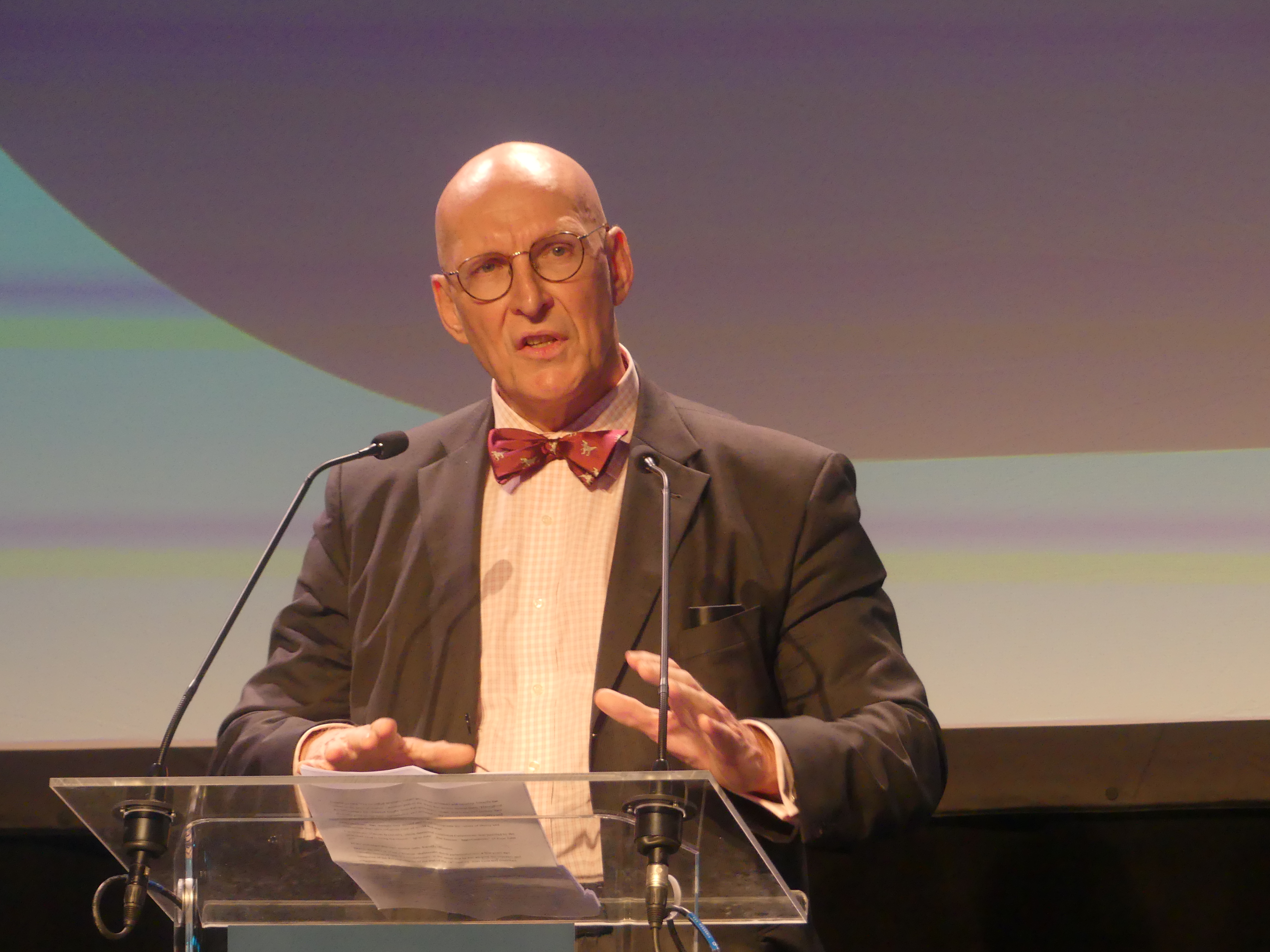
Andreas Kinneging

Andreas Antonius Maria Kinneging (born 26 February 1962) is Professor of Legal Philosophy at the University of Leiden, and a conservative philosopher in the Netherlands.

== Background ==
Born in Eindhoven Kinneging was raised in a Catholic family in the Dutch province of Zeeland. He studied political science at the Catholic University of Nijmegen (currently named Radboud University Nijmegen), graduating with the highest honours.

== Classical-liberal period ==
Upon graduation he accepted a position with the Prof.mr. B.M. Teldersstichting, a think-tank affiliated with the liberal party VVD. During his tenure there, Kinneging developed into a prolific author on the philosophy of classic liberalism and gained influence in the field. In the early 1990s, Kinneging became increasingly dissatisfied with classical liberalism. He believed that the VVD was intellectually becoming increasingly pedestrian. He also strongly disagreed with the drift toward social-liberalism within the party. Kinneging finally cancelled his membership of the VVD party in 1999.

== University career ==
Kinneging returned to the university after briefly working for the Dutch Ministry of Finance. In the late 1980s, he joined the Department of Public Administration of the Leiden University as an assistant professor, where he taught such students as the later member of parliament Ayaan Hirsi Ali, and conservative activist Joshua Livestro.

Kinneging earned his PhD with the highest honors on 1 October 1994, with an English dissertation entitled Aristocracy, Antiquity and History - Classicism in Political Thought, later published by Transaction Publishers. The book criticizes the standard literature on Modernity, by pointing out that remnants of classical wisdom - e.g. the ethics of honor - stayed with us for much longer than commonly thought. The book emphasizes Romans over Greeks. Following the trail of Herbert Butterfield (The Whig Interpretation of History), Kinneging rejects the teleological study of the past.

Confirmed by a wave of recent historical studies (e.g. Jonathan Dewald's European Nobility) Kinneging holds that the nobles, and thus Roman political and social models, were dominant much longer than suspected. The book is especially esteemed for its central cluster of chapters, which analyze the political and social thought of the Romans, Cicero in particular, in great detail. In 1996 Kinneging moved to the law school of the Leiden University, the oldest and among the most prestigious of Dutch law faculties. Kinneging was quickly promoted to tenured associate professor and accepted a chair in legal philosophy as full professor on 1 August 2004. His fields of expertise are jurisprudence, political philosophy, ethics, axiology, deontology and constitutional theory.

Writing his dissertation strengthened the process of intellectual 'conversion' that gradually developed Kinneging from a right-wing liberal into a classical conservative, who reaches back for the intellectual traditions of Greco-Roman antiquity and Judeo-Christian ethics. In 1999 Kinneging started a public debate in the Netherlands devoted to the resuscitation of conservatism, which culminated in the founding of the highly successful think-tank and educational group the Edmund Burke Foundation, of which Kinneging became president.

The post-dissertation by Kinneging focused especially on virtue ethics. He also discovered the school of realist phenomenology characterized by such philosophers as Edmund Husserl, Max Scheler, Nicolai Hartmann, Adolf Reinach, Dietrich von Hildebrand, Aurel Kolnai, Edith Stein and others. Kinneging edited a new edition of Nicolai Hartmann's Ethics (in three volumes, 2001-2004). In 2005 he published, in Dutch Geography of Good and Evil, a collection of essays written in the preceding decade. In 2021, the Complaints Committee at Leiden University found that students' complaints of "intimidating behaviour" and harassment by Kinneging in online lectures were well-founded.

== Positions ==
Kinneging was president of the Advisory Board of the Edmund Burke Foundation and chairman of the board of trustees of the Center for European Renewal. He no longer serves on the boards of either organization. In the early 1990s Kinneging was chairman of the board of the Stimezo abortion clinic in The Hague.
