= Yasmine Allas =

Somali-Dutch actress and writer

Yasmine Allas ياسمين علس
- Born: 1967 (age 58–59); Mogadishu, Somalia
- Occupations: actor, writer
- Years active: 1980s–present
- Children: 1

Yasmine Allas (Somali: Yasmiin Callas, Arabic: ياسمين علس; born 1967) is a Somali-Dutch actress and writer.

== Personal life ==
Allas was born in 1967 in Mogadishu, the capital of Somalia. Her family was wealthy, with her father serving as a General in the Somali army. He was killed in 1977, when she was still a child.

Allas attended a local private school, where she learned Italian and English.

At the age of fourteen, she traveled to join her mother's relatives in Saudi Arabia. Allas subsequently moved to Belgium and then the Netherlands in 1987.

In Amsterdam, Allas attended drama school. She also met her Dutch husband, with whom she has a daughter.

In 2006, she returned to Hargeisa in northwestern Somalia to take part in a television documentary about her youth.

Allas is Muslim. She speaks Somali, Italian, English, and Dutch languages.

== Career ==
Allas began her acting career in the late 1980s in Amsterdam, performing with The Trust theater group. Opposite Jaap Spijkers, she played Gretchen in the company's well-received 1995 production of Faust by the Austrian playwright Gustav Ernst. Allas also worked a number of years as an actress with the Dutch director Theu Boermans. She likewise performed with various ensembles, and had her own solo show.

In 1998, Allas wrote her first novel Idil, A Girl (Idil, een meisje), which was a critical success. She followed that with 2001's The General with Six Fingers (De generaal met de zes vingers). The book was in turn well received by literary critics. It served as a basis for her third novel, The Blue Room (De blauwe kamer), released in 2004. Two years later, Allas launched Uprooted but Still Home (Ontheemd en toch thuis), an essay collection on her own background and beliefs and dealing with Dutch culture. In 2010, she released her fourth novel, the highly acclaimed A Handed-Down History (Een nagelaten verhaal). The story is inspired by her journey back to Somalia in 2006, and was reprinted several times after its initial publication.

Additionally, Allas wrote Hommel, a short story prepared for the MatchBoox art books company. The Dutch writer, artist and filmmaker Marion Bloem provided illustrations for the special piece. Allas has likewise written for the Volkskrant, one of the Netherlands' leading newspapers.

Besides acting and writing, Allas is also a Muslim activist. She is a member of the Marhaba Organisation, an Islamic socio-cultural foundation with a focus on strengthening bonds between local communities. She is also a member of the Women's Islamic Initiative in Spirituality and Equality (WISE), a global program, social network and grassroots social justice movement led by Muslim women. In addition, Allas was a participant in the American Society for Muslim Advancement's Muslim Leaders of Tomorrow initiative. She is also a part of the Global Experts group of professional analysts, with media and female rights in North Africa, the Middle East and Europe as her area of expertise.

== Works ==
- Idil, A Girl (Idil, een meisje), 1998
- The General with Six Fingers (De generaal met de zes vingers), 2001
- The Blue Room (De blauwe kamer), 2004
- Uprooted but Still Home (Ontheemd en toch thuis), 2006
- A Handed-Down History (Een nagelaten verhaal), 2010
