= List of football clubs in Somalia =

The following is an incomplete list of association football clubs based in Somalia. For a complete list see Category:Football clubs in Somalia

== A ==
- Alba FC

== B ==
- Badbaado (Mogadishu)
- Banaadir Telecom FC (Mogadishu)
- Bariga Dhexe (Afgoye)
- Bosaso FC

== D ==
- Dekedaha FC (Mogadishu)

== E ==
- Elman FC (Mogadishu)

== F ==
- Feynuus FC (Mogadishu)

== G ==
- Gaadiidka FC
- Gasko FC

== H ==
- Hoga
- Horseed FC (Horseed)

== J ==
- Jamhuuriya TB (Gaalkacyo)
- Jeenyo United FC (Mogadishu)

== M ==
- Marine Club FC
- Mogadishu Municipality

== N ==
- National Printing Agency FC

== S ==
- Savana FC
- SAHAFI FC (Mogadishu)
- Somali Fruit FC
- Somali Police FC
- Super Shell (Afgoye)

== T ==
- TOP FC (Mogadishu)

== W ==
- Wagad
- Waxool FC
