= List of top-division football clubs in CAF countries =

CAF countries on this map of the world's six football confederations.

This is a list of top-division association football clubs in CAF countries. CAF, the African football confederation, includes all African countries as members.

The French Overseas Department of Réunion and the autonomous island of Zanzibar have their own football associations which are associate members of CAF (but not members of FIFA). Mayotte, a French Overseas Territory, Saint Helena, a British Overseas Territory, and Western Sahara, a disputed territory, are not members of CAF or any other football confederation.

Each of the CAF member countries have their own football league systems. The clubs playing in each top-level league compete for the title as the country's club champions, and also for places in next season's CAF club competitions, i.e., the CAF Champions League and the CAF Confederation Cup. Due to promotion and relegation, the clubs playing in the top-level league in many countries are different every season.

The champions of the previous season in each country are listed in bold.

- For clubs playing at lower divisions, see the separate articles linked to in the relevant sections.
- For clubs belonging to any of the other five continental football confederations of the world, see List of football (soccer) clubs.

**Club name**	Club finished the previous season as league champions.

== Algeria ==
- Country: Algeria
- Football association: Algerian Football Federation
- Top-level league: Algerian Ligue Professionnelle 1

As of 2024–25 season:

Locations of teams for the 2024–25 Algerian Ligue Professionnelle 1

Club	City
ASO Chlef	Chlef
CR Belouizdad	Algiers
CS Constantine	Constantine
ES Mostaganem	Mostaganem
ES Sétif	Sétif
HB Chelghoum Laid	Chelghoum Laid
JS Kabylie	Tizi Ouzou
JS Saoura	Béchar
**MC Alger**	Algiers
MC El Bayadh	El Bayadh
MC Oran	Oran
NC Magra	Magra
Olympique Akbou	Akbou
Paradou AC	Algiers
RC Arbaâ	Larbaâ
US Biskra	Biskra
USM Alger	Algiers
USM Khenchela	Khenchela

== Angola ==
- Country: Angola
- Football association: Angolan Football Federation
- Top-level league: Girabola

As of 2024–25 season:

Club	Location
Académica do Lobito	Lobito
Bravos do Maquis	Luena
Carmona	Uíge
Desportivo da Huíla	Lubango
Escolinha Isaac & Filhos	Benguela
Interclube	Luanda
Kabuscorp	Luanda
Luanda City	Luanda
Lunda Sul	Saurimo
**Petro de Luanda**	Luanda
Primeiro de Agosto	Luanda
Recreativo do Libolo	Libolo
Sagrada Esperança	Dundo
São Salvador	São Salvador
Santa Rita de Cássia	Uíge
Wiliete	Benguela

== Benin ==
- Country: Benin
- Football association: Benin Football Federation
- Top-level league: Benin Premier League

As of 2023–24 season:

Club	Location
AS Cotonou	Cotonou
AS Dragons FC de l'Ouémé	Porto-Novo
ASPAC FC	Cotonou
AS Sobemap	Porto-Novo
AS Tukunnin de Kandi	Kandi
Ayema FC	Seme-Kpodji
Bani Gansè FC	Banikoara
**Coton**	Ouidah
Dadjè FC	Aplahoué
Damissa FC	Dogbo
Dynamo FC d'Abomey	Abomey
Espoir FC	Savalou
JSP	Pobè
Loto-Popo	Lokossa
Requins de l'Atlantique	Cotonou
US Cavaliers de Nikki	Nikki
USS Kraké	Porto-Novo

== Botswana ==
- Country: Botswana
- Football association: Botswana Football Association
- Top-level league: Botswana Premier League

As of 2025-26 season:

Club	Location
Black Lions	
Botswana Defence Force XI	Gaborone
Calendar Stars	
Extension Gunners	Lobatse
Gaborone United	Gaborone
**Jwaneng Galaxy**	Jwaneng
Matebele	Matebeleng
Mochudi Centre Chiefs	Mochudi
Morupule Wanderers	Palapye
Nico United	Selebi-Phikwe
Orapa United	Orapa
Police XI	Otse
Santa Green	
Sua Flamingoes	Sowa
TAFIC	Francistown
Township Rollers	Gaborone

== Burkina Faso ==
- Country: Burkina Faso
- Football association: Burkinabé Football Federation
- Top-level league: Burkinabé Premier League

As of 2024-25 season:

Club	Location
**AS Douanes**	Ouagadougou
AS SONABEL	Ouagadougou
ASEC Koudougou	Koudougou
ASF Bobo Dioulasso	Bobo Dioulasso
ASFA Yennenga	Ouagadougou
Étoile Filante	Ouagadougou
Majestic	Pô
Rahimo FC	Bobo Dioulasso
RC Bobo Dioulasso	Bobo Dioulasso
RC Kadiogo	Kadiogo
Réal du Faso	Ouagadougou
Salitas	Ouagadougou
Sporting Cascades	Niangoloko
Vitesse FC	Bobo Dioulasso
US Comoé	Banfora
US Forces Armées	Ouagadougou

== Burundi ==
- Country: Burundi
- Football association: Football Federation of Burundi
- Top-level league: Burundi Ligue A

As of 2024–25 season

Club	Location
Académie Deira	Buganda
Aigle Noir Makamba	Makamba
AS Inter Star	Bujumbura
BS Dynamik	Bujumbura
Bumamuru	Buganda
Flambeau du Centre	Gitega
Kayanza United	Kayanza
Le Messager FC	Ngozi
LLBA FC	Bujumbura
Moso Sugar Company	Makamba
Musongati	Gitega
Ngozi City	Mwumba
Olympic Star Muyinga	Muyinga
Royal Vision 2026	Buganda
Rukinzo	Bujumbura
**Vital'O FC**	Bujumbura

== Cameroon ==
- Country: Cameroon
- Football association: Cameroonian Football Federation
- Top-level league: Elite One

As of 2024-25 season

Locations of the 2024–25 Elite One Teams

Club	Location
Aigle Royal Menoua	Dschang
Bamboutos	Mbouda
Canon Yaoundé	Yaoundé
Colombe Sportive	Yaoundé
Coton Sport FC	Garoua
Dynamo de Douala	Douala
Fauve Azur Elite	Yaoundé
Fortuna	Yaoundé
Gazelle	Garoua
Les Astres FC	Douala
Panthère du Ndé	Bangangté
PWD Bamenda	Bamenda
Stade Renard de Melong	Melong
US Douala	Douala
**Victoria United**	Limbé
YOSA	Bamenda

== Cape Verde ==
- Country: Cape Verde
- Football association: Cape Verdean Football Federation
- Top-level league: Cape Verdean football Championships

As of 2023-2024 season

=== Group A ===
Club	Location
Académico do Aeroporto	Espargos
Associação Académica do Fogo	São Filipe
Juventude do Norte	Boa Vista
Rosariense Clube	Ribeira Grande

=== Group B ===
Club	Location
Barreirense FC	Barreiro
GD Palmeira	Santa Maria
GD Varandinha	Tarrafal
SC Morabeza	Nova Sintra

=== Group C ===
Club	Location
**Boavista**	Praia
FC Derby	Mindelo
FC Ultramarina	Tarrafal
Sanjoanense	Porto Novo

== Central African Republic ==
- Country: Central African Republic
- Football association: Central African Football Federation
- Top-level league: Central African Republic League

As of 2024 season:

Club	Location
Anges de Fatima	Bangui
AS CNSS	Bangui
AS Gbangré	Bangui
DFC 8ème Arrondissement	Bangui
Espérance FC du 5ème Arrondissement	Bangui
FC FDS	Bangui
Olympic Real de Bangui	Bangui
Red Star	Bangui
SOS Pius Njawe	Bangui
Stade Centrafricaine Tocages	Bangui
**AS Tempête Mocaf**	Bangui
TP USCA Bangui	Bangui

== Chad ==
- Country: Chad
- Football association: Chadian Football Federation
- Top-level league: Chad Premier League

As of 2023 season:

Club	Location
Aigle FC d'Abéché	N'Djamena
Aiglons FC	N'Djamena
AS Draib de Moussoro	N'Djamena
AS Mairie de Pala	N'Djamena
**AS PSI**	N'Djamena
BEAC de Sarh	N'Djamena
Elect-Sport de Bongor	N'Djamena
Eléphant Zakouma du Salamat	N'Djamena
Foullah Edifice FC	N'Djamena
Sahel FC de Borkou	N'Djamena
Tout Puissaint Elect-Sport FC	N'Djamena
Université de Moundou	N'Djamena

== Comoros ==
- Country: Comoros
- Football association: Comoros Football Federation
- Top-level league: Comoros Premier League

As of 2023 season

Club	Location
Etoile d'Or Mirontsy FC	Mirontsi
Etoile du Centre	Salamani
**US Zilimadjou**	Moroni

== Congo ==
- Country: Congo
- Football association: Congolese Football Federation
- Top-level league: Congo Premier League

As of 2023 season

Club	Location
**AC Léopards**	Dolisie
AS Chéminots	Pointe-Noire
AS Jeunesse Unie de Kintélé	Brazzaville
AS Otohô	Oyo
AS Vegas	Brazzaville
Bana Nouvelle Génération	Brazzaville
CARA Brazzaville	Brazzaville
CSM Diables Noirs	Brazzaville
Étoile du Congo	Brazzaville
FC Kondzo	Brazzaville
FC Nathaly's	Pointe-Noire
Inter Club Brazzaville	Brazzaville
JS Talangaï	Brazzaville
Vita Club Mokanda	Pointe-Noire

== Democratic Republic of the Congo ==
- Country: Democratic Republic of the Congo
- Football association: Congolese Association Football Federation
- Top-level league: Linafoot

As of 2024–2025 season

=== Group A ===
Club	Location
AS Malole	Kananga
AS Simba	Kolwezi
Blessing	Kolwezi
CS Don Bosco	Lubumbashi
Lubumbashi Sport	Lubumbashi
FC Saint-Éloi Lupopo	Lubumbashi
JS Groupe Bazano	Lubumbashi
Panda B52	Likasi
SM Sanga Balende	Mbuji-Mayi
Tanganyika	Kalemie
**TP Mazembe**	Lubumbashi
Tshinkunku	Kananga

=== Group B ===
Club	Location
Académic Club Rangers	Kinshasa
Anges Verts	Kinshasa
AS Dauphins Noirs	Goma
AS Maniema Union	Kindu
AS Vita Club	Kinshasa
Céleste	Mbandaka
DC Motema Pembe	Kinshasa
Etoile de Kivu	Bukavu
FC Renaissance du Congo	Kinshasa
JS Kinshasa	Kinshasa
Kuya Sport	Kinshasa
New Jak	Kinshasa
OC Bukavu Dawa	Bukavu

== Djibouti ==
- Country: Djibouti
- Football association: Djiboutian Football Federation
- Top-level league: Djibouti Premier League

As of 2024-25 season

Club	Location
AS Ali Sabieh Djibouti Télécom	Djibouti
**AS Arta/Solar7**	Djibouti
AS Port	Djibouti
FC Arta	Djibouti
FC Dikhil	Djibouti
Garde Côtes	Djibouti
Garde Républicaine	Djibouti
Gendarmerie Nationale	Djibouti
Q5	Djibouti
SDC Group	Djibouti

== Egypt ==
- Country: Egypt
- Football association: Egyptian Football Association
- Top-level league: Egyptian Premier League

As of 2024–25

Locations of the 2024–25 Egyptian Premier League teams

Club	Location
**Al Ahly**	Cairo
Ceramica Cleopatra	Giza
ENPPI	Cairo
Ghazl El Mahalla	El Mahalla El Kubra
El Gouna	El Gouna
Haras El Hodoud	Mahatet El Raml
Ismaily	Ismailia
Al Ittihad	Alexandria
Al Masry	Port Said
Modern Sport	Mokattam
National Bank of Egypt	Agouza
Petrojet	Suez
Pharco	Amreya
Pyramids	New Cairo
Smouha	Smouha
Tala'ea El Gaish	Cairo
Zamalek	Mit Okba
ZED	Sheikh Zayed City

== Equatorial Guinea ==
- Country: Equatorial Guinea
- Football association: Equatoguinean Football Federation
- Top-level league: Equatoguinean Premier League

As of 2024 season

=== Región Continental ===
Club	Location
15 de Agosto	Akonibe
Akonangui FC	Ebebiyín
Akurenam FC	Acurenam
Bata City Sports	Bata
Deportivo Evinayong	Evinayong
**Deportivo Mongomo**	Mongomo
Dragón FC	Bata
EDSA	Bata
Fundación Bata	Bata
Inter Litoral Academy	Litoral
Real Bomudi	Litoral
Unión Vesper	Bata

=== Región Insular ===
Club	Location
Cano Sport	Malabo
Deportivo Ebenezer	Luba
CD Unidad Malabo	Malabo
Diablo Rojo	Niefang
Leones Vegetarianos FC	Malabo
Malabo United FC	Malabo
Nueva Zaragoza	Malabo
Real Teka FC	Malabo
Sony de Elá Nguema	Malabo
Sport Pison	Malabo
The Panthers FC	Malabo
UD Santa Maria	Malabo

== Eritrea ==
- Country: Eritrea
- Football association: Eritrean National Football Federation
- Top-level league: Eritrean Premier League

Club	City
Adulis Club	Asmara
FC Al Tahrir	Asmara
Asmara Brewery	Asmara
**Denden FC**	Asmara
FC Edaga Hamus	Edaga Hamus
Mdlaw Megbi	Asmara
Red Sea FC	Asmara
Tesfa FC	Asmara

== Eswatini ==
- Country: Eswatini
- Football association: Eswatini Football Association
- Top-level league: Premier League of Eswatini

As of 2025-26 season

Club	City
Amawele	
Ezulwini United	Mbabane
Green Mamba FC	Simunye
Illovo	Lubombo
Malanti Chiefs	Piggs Peak
Manzini Sea Birds	Manzini
Manzini SWanderers	Manzini
Mbabane Highlanders	Mbabane
Mbabane Swallows F.C.	Mbabane
Moneni Pirates F.C.	Manzini
**Nsingizini Hotspurs FC**	Shiselweni
Rangers	Shiselweni
Royal Leopards F.C.	Simunye
Sisonkhe FC	Manzini
Tabankulu Celtics	Tabankulu
Young Buffaloes FC	Matsapha

== Ethiopia ==
- Country: Ethiopia
- Football association: Ethiopian Football Federation
- Top-level league: Ethiopian Premier League

As of 2024-25 season

Club	City
Adama City	Adama
Arba Minch Kenema	Arba Minch
Bahir Dar Kenema	Bahir Dar
**CBE SA**	Addis Abeba
Dire Dawa Kanema	Dire Dawa
Ethiopian Coffee FC	Addis Abeba
Ethiopian Medhin	Addis Abeba
Fasil Kenema	Gondar
Hadiya Hossana	Hosaena
Hawassa City	Hawassa
Mebrat Hail	Addis Abeba
Mekelakeya	Addis Ababa
Mekelle 70 Enderta	Mekelle
Saint George SC	Addis Abeba
Shire Endaselassie	Shire
Sidama Coffee	Hawassa
Welwalo Adigrat University	Adigrat
Wolaitta Dicha	Sodo

== Gabon ==
- Country: Gabon
- Football association: Gabonese Football Federation
- Top-level league: Gabon Championnat National D1

As of 2024-25 season

Club	City
AS Dikaki	Fougamou
AS Mangasport	Moanda
**AS Stade Mandji**	Port-Gentil
Bouenguidi Sport	Koulamoutou
Centre Sportif de Bendjé	Bendje
Cercle Mbéri Sportif	Libreville
CF Mounana	Libreville
FC 105 Libreville	Libreville
Lambaréné AC	Lambaréné
Lozo Sport	Lastoursville
US Bitam	Bitam
US Oyem	Oyem
Vantour Mangoungou	Libreville

== Gambia ==
- Country: Gambia
- Football association: Gambia Football Association
- Top-level league: Gambian Championnat National D1

As of 2024-25 season

Club	City
Armed Forces	Banjul
Banjul United FC	Banjul
Bombada	Brikama
Brikama United FC	Brikama
BST Galaxy FC	Brikama
Falcons	Abuko
Fortune	Madiana
Gambian Dutch Lions	Banjul
Greater Tomorrow Football Academy	Brikama
Hart Academy FC	Soma
Hawks	Banjul
Marimoo	Serekunda
**Real de Banjul F.C.**	Banjul
Team Rhino	Banjul
Today Makes Tomorrow FC	Abuko
Steve Biko FC	Bakau

== Ghana ==
- Country: Ghana
- Football association: Ghana Football Association
- Top-level league: Ghana Premier League

As of 2024-25 season

Location of the 2024–25 Ghana Premier League teams

Club	City
Accra Lions	Accra
Aduana FC	Dormaa Ahenkro
Asante Kotoko SC	Kumasi
Basake Holy Stars	Ainyinase
Bechem United FC	Bechem
Berekum Chelsea F.C.	Berekum
Dreams	Dawu
Heart of Lions F.C.	Kpandu
Hearts of Oak SC	Accra
Karela United	Nalerigu
Legon Cities FC	Accra
Medeama SC	Tarkwa
Nations FC	Kumasi
Nsoatreman	Nsuatre
**Samartex**	Samreboi
Vision FC	Tema
Young Apostles FC	Wenchi

== Guinea ==
- Country: Guinea
- Football association: Guinean Football Federation
- Top-level league: Guinée Championnat National

As of 2023-24 season

Club	City
Académie SOAR	Ratoma
AS Ashanti Golden Boys	Siguiri
AS Kaloum Star	Siguiri
ASM Sangarédi	Sangarédi
CI Kamsar	Kamsar
FC Renaissance	Conakry
FC Séquence	Dixinn
Flamme Olympique	Conakry
Gangan FC	Kindia
Hafia FC	Conakry
Horoya AC	Conakry
Loubha Télimélé FC	Télimélé
**Milo FC**	Kankan
Wakriya	Boké

== Guinea-Bissau ==
- Country: Guinea-Bissau
- Football association: Football Federation of Guinea-Bissau
- Top-level league: Campeonato Nacional da Guiné-Bissau

As of 2024-25 season

Club	City
AFC Nhacra	Nhacra
Cavalos Brancos	Bissau
CF Os Balantas	Mansôa
FC Canchungo	Canchungo
FC Cumura	Bissau
FC Pelundo	Pelundo
FC Sonaco	Sonaco
FC Tigres de Fronteira	São Domingos
Flamengo FC	Bissau
Nuno Tristão FC	Bula
Recreativo de Gabú	Gabú
SC Portos de Bissau	Bissau
Sporting Clube de Bafatá	Bafatá
Sporting Clube de Bissau	Bissau
**Sport Bissau e Benfica**	Bissau
União Desportiva Internacional	União

== Ivory Coast ==
- Country: Ivory Coast
- Football association: Ivorian Football Federation
- Top-level league: Ligue 1

As of 2024-25 season

Locations of the 2024–25 Ligue 1 teams

Club	Location
Academie de Foot Amadou Diallo	Djékanou
Bouaké FC	Bouaké
Denguelé	Odienné
Korhogo	Korhogo
**FC San Pédro**	San Pédro
LYS Sassandra	Abidjan
Mimosas	Abidjan
Mouna FC	Akoupé
RC Abidjan	Abidjan
S.O.A.	Yamoussoukro
SOL	Abidjan
Stade d'Abidjan	Abidjan
Stella Club d'Adjamé	Abidjan

== Kenya ==
- Country: Kenya
- Football association: Football Kenya Federation
- Top-level league: Kenyan Premier League

Club	City
AFC Leopards	Nairobi
APS Bomet	
Bandari F.C.	Mombasa
Bidco United	Thika
**Gor Mahia F.C.**	Nairobi
Kakamega Homeboyz	Kakamega
Kariobangi Sharks	Machakos
KCB	Nairobi
Kenya Police	Nairobi
Mara Sugar	Awendo
Mathare United	Nairobi
Murang'a SEAL	Murang'a
Nairobi United	Nairobi
Posta Rangers	Eldoret
Shabana	Kisii
Sofapaka F.C.	Nairobi
Tusker F.C.	Nairobi
Ulinzi Stars F.C.	Nakuru

== Lesotho ==
- Country: Lesotho
- Football association: Lesotho Football Association
- Top-level league: Lesotho Premier League

As of 2024-25 season

Club	City
ACE Maseru	Maseru
Bantu FC	Mafeteng
Lesotho Correctional Services	Maseru
Lesotho Defence Force FC	Maseru
Lijabatho	Morija
Lifofane	Butha-Buthe
Limkokwing University FC	Maseru
Linare FC	Hlotse
**Lioli FC**	Teyateyaneng
Liphakoe	Moyeni
LMPS FC	Maseru
Machokha	Maseru
Majantja	Mohale's Hoek
Manonyane	Manonyane
Matlama FC	Maseru
Mzamane	Mokhotlong

== Liberia ==
- Country: Liberia
- Football association: Liberia Football Association
- Top-level league: LFA First Division

As of 2024-25 season

Club	City
BEA Mountain	Robertsport
Black Man Warrior	Monrovia
Discoveries SA	Gardnersville
Fassell	Monrovia
Freeport	Monrovia
Global Pharma	Monrovia
Heaven Eleven	Yekepa
Invincible Eleven	Monrovia
LISCR FC	Monrovia
LPRC Oilers	Monrovia
Mighty Barrolle	Monrovia
Paynesville	Paynesville
Shaita	Careysburg
**Watanga FC**	Monrovia

== Libya ==
- Country: Libya
- Football association: Libyan Football Federation
- Top-level league: Libyan Premier League

As of 2024-25 season

=== East ===
==== Group A ====
Club	City
Al Akhdar	Bayda
Al-Ansar	Bayda
Al-Anwar	Abyar
Al-Borouq	Al Abraq
**Al-Nasr**	Benghazi
Al-Suqoor	Tobruk
Al Tahaddy	Benghazi
Al-Wefaq Ajdabiya	Ajdabiyah
Khaleej Sirte	Sirte

==== Group B ====
Club	City
Al-Ahly Benghazi	Benghazi
Al Andalus	Tobruk
Al-Branes	Benghazi
Al-Hilal Benghazi	Benghazi
Al-Mahdia	Sabha
Al-Murooj	Benghazi
Al-Sadaqa	Shahhat
Al Ta'awon	Ajdabiya

=== West ===
==== Group C ====
Club	City
Abu Salim	Tripoli
Al-Bashaer	Misrata
Al-Ittihad Tripoli	Tripoli
Al-Majd	Tripoli
Al Nahda Sabha	Sabha
Al Tarsana	Tripoli
Asswehly	Misrata
Olympic Azzaweya	Zawiya
Shabab Al-Ghar	Tripoli

==== Group D ====
Club	City
Abi al Ashar	Tajura
Al-Ahli Tripoli	Tripoli
Al Dhahra	Tripoli
Al Khums	Al-Khums
Al-Madina	Tripoli
Al-Malaab Al-Libby	Tripoli
Al-Watan	Zawiya
Alittihad Misurata	Misrata
Asaria	Tripoli

== Madagascar ==
- Country: Madagascar
- Football association: Malagasy Football Federation
- Top-level league: Malagasy Pro League

As of 2024-25 season

=== Conference Nord ===
Club	City
ASA Diana	Antsiranana
Fosa Juniors	Mahajanga
Theo Sava	Antalaha
Tsaramandroso	Tsaramandroso

=== Conference Centre ===
Club	City
Ajesaia	Antananarivo
CFF	Antananarivo
COSFAP	Antananarivo
**Disciples FC**	Analamanga
Elgeco Plus	Antananarivo
Fanalamanga	Ambatondrazaka
Inate FC Rouge	Antsirabe
USCA Foot	Antananarivo

=== Conference Sud ===
Club	City
3FB Toliara	Toliara
Avenir Sainte Anne	Antananarivo
Mama FCA	Antananarivo
Zanak'Ala	Fianarantsoa

== Malawi ==
- Country: Malawi
- Football association: Football Association of Malawi
- Top-level league: Super League of Malawi

As of 2024 season

Club	City
Baka City	Karonga
Bangwe All Stars	Blantyre
Chitipa United	Karonga
CIVO United	Lilongwe
Creck	Lilongwe
Dedza Dynamos	Dedza
FOMO	Mulanje
Kamuzu Barracks	Blantyre
Karonga United	Karonga
MAFCO FC	Salima
Mighty Tigers	Blantyre
Mighty Wanderers	Blantyre
Moyale Barracks	Mzuzu
Mzuzu City Hammers	Mzuzu
Red Lions	Zomba
**Silver Strikers**	Lilongwe

== Mali ==
- Country: Mali
- Football association: Malian Football Federation
- Top-level league: Malien Premiere Division

As of 2024-25 season

Club	City
Afrique Football Élite	Bamako
AS Bakaridjan	Ségou
AS Korofina	Bamako
AS Police	Bamako
AS Real Bamako	Bamako
Binga	Bamako
Diarra	Bamako
**Djoliba AC**	Bamako
Étoiles Mandé	Kolokani
Onze Créateurs de Niaréla	Bamako
Stade Malien	Bamako
US Bougouba	Koulikoro
US Bougouni	Bougouni
USFAS Bamako	Bamako

== Mauritania ==
- Country: Mauritania
- Football association: Football Federation of the Islamic Republic of Mauritania
- Top-level league: Super D1

As of 2024-25 season

Club	City
Al-Hilal	Omdurman, Sudan
Al-Merrikh	Omdurman, Sudan
AS Douanes	Nouakchott
AS Garde Nationale	Nouakchott
AS Pompiers	Nouakchott
ACS Ksar	Nouakchott
ASC Gendrim	Nouakchott
ASC SNIM	Nouadhibou
ASC Touldé	Kaédi
Chemal FC	Nouakchott
**FC Nouadhibou**	Nouadhibou
FC N'Zidane	Atar
FC Tevragh-Zeina	Nouakchott
Inter Nouakchott	Nouakchott
Kaédi	Kaédi
Nouakchott Kings	Nouakchott

== Mauritius ==
- Country: Mauritius
- Football association: Mauritius Football Association
- Top-level league: Mauritian Premier League

As of 2024-25 season

Club	City
AS de Vacoas-Phoenix	Vacoas-Phoenix
AS Port-Louis 2000	Port Louis
**Cercle de Joachim SC**	Curepipe
Chebel Citizens	Beau Bassin-Rose Hill
Entente Boulet Rouge-Riche Mare Rovers	Central Flacq
GRSE Wanderers	Central Flacq
La Cure Waves	Port Louis
Pamplemousses SC	Belle Vue Harel
Petite Rivière Noire FC	Tamarin
Pointe-aux-Sables Mates	Port Louis

== Morocco ==
- Country: Morocco
- Football association: Royal Moroccan Football Federation
- Top-level league: Botola Pro

As of 2025–26 season

Locations of the 2025–26 Botola teams

Team name	Acronym	Location
AS FAR	ASFAR	Rabat
US Yacoub El Mansour	USYM	Rabat
COD Meknès	CODM	Meknes
Difaâ El Jadidi	DHJ	El Jadida
FUS Rabat	FUS	Rabat
HUS Agadir	HUSA	Agadir
IR Tanger	IRT	Tanger
Olympique Dcheira	OD	Dcheira El Jihadia
Maghreb de Fès	MAS	Fez
KAC Marrakech	KAC	Marrakesh
Olympic Safi	OCS	Safi
Raja Casablanca	RCA	Casablanca
RCA Zemamra	RCAZ	Zemamra
**RS Berkane**	**RSB**	**Berkane**
UTS Rabat	UTS	Rabat
Wydad Casablanca	WAC	Casablanca

== Mozambique ==
- Country: Mozambique
- Football association: Mozambican Football Federation
- Top-level league: Moçambola

As of 2025 season

Club	City
AD Vilankulo	Vilankulo
**Associação Black Bulls**	Maputo
Baía de Pemba	Pemba
Brera Tchumene	Maputo
CD Costa do Sol	Maputo
CD Nacala	Nacala
Ferroviário Beira	Beira
Ferroviário Lichinga	Lichinga
Ferroviário Maputo	Maputo
Ferroviário Nampula	Nampula
Textáfrica	Chimoio
UD Songo	Songo

== Namibia ==
- Country: Namibia
- Football association: Namibia Football Association
- Top-level league: Namibia Premiership

As of 2024-2025 season

NPFL teams 2024/25

Club	City
**African Stars**	Katutura
Blue Boys	Swakopmund
Blue Waters	Walvis Bay
Bucks Buccaneers	Windhoek
Eeshoke Chula Chula	Oshikango
Cuca Tops	Rundu
Julinho Sporting	Rundu
Khomas NAMPOL	Windhoek
KK Palace	Ondangwa
Mighty Gunners	Otjiwarongo
Okahandja United	Okahandja
Ongos SC	Windhoek
UNAM	Windhoek
United Africa Tigers	Windhoek
Young Africans	Gobabis
Young Brazilians	Karasburg

== Niger ==
- Country: Niger
- Football association: Nigerien Football Federation
- Top-level league: Super Ligue

As of 2024-25 season:

Club	City
AS Douanes	Niamey
AS FAN	Niamey
**AS GNN**	Niamey
AS Police	Niamey
AS Renaissance	Niamey
AS UAM	Niamey
ASN Nigelec	Niamey
Espoir FC	Zinder
Jangorzo FC	Maradi
JS Tahoua	Tahoua
Liberté FC	Niamey
Olympic FC	Niamey
Sahel SC	Niamey
US Gendarmerie Nationale	Niamey
Urana FC	Arlit
Wombèye AC	Maradi

== Nigeria ==
- Country: Nigeria
- Football association: Nigeria Football Federation
- Top-level league: Nigeria Premier Football League

As of 2024-25 season

Locations of the 2024–25 Nigeria Premier Football League teams

Club	City
Abia Warriors F.C.	Umuahia
Akwa United F.C.	Uyo
Bayelsa United F.C.	Yenegoa
Bendel Insurance	Benin City
El-Kanemi Warriors F.C.	Maiduguri
**Enugu Rangers**	Enugu
Enyimba	Aba
Heartland F.C.	Owerri
Ikorodu City	Ikorodu
Kano Pillars F.C.	Kano
Katsina United	Katsina
Kwara United	Ilorin
Lobi Stars F.C.	Makurdi
Nasarawa United F.C.	Lafia
Niger Tornadoes	Minna
Plateau United	Jos
Remo Stars	Ikenne
Rivers United	Port Harcourt
Shooting Stars	Ibadan
Sunshine Stars F.C.	Akure

== Réunion ==
- Country: Réunion
- Football association: Réunionese Football League
- Top-level league: Réunion Premier League

As of 2024 season:

Club	City
ACF Piton Saint-Leu	Saint-Leu
AF Saint-Louis	Saint-Louis
**AS Excelsior**	Saint-Joseph
AS Saint-Louisienne	Saint-Louis
AS Sainte-Suzanne	Sainte-Suzanne
JS Gauloise	Bras-Panon
JS Saint-Pierroise	Saint-Pierre
JS Sainte-Rose	Sainte-Rose
La Tamponnaise	Le Tampon
Ravine Blanche	Saint-Pierre
Saint-Denis FC	Saint-Denis
Saint-Pauloise FC	Saint-Paul
SS Jeanne d'Arc	Le Port
Trois Bassins	Trois-Bassins

== Rwanda ==
- Country: Rwanda
- Football association: Rwandese Association Football Federation
- Top-level league: Rwandan Premier League

As of 2024-25 season

Club	City
Amagaju F.C.	Gikongoro
AS Kigali	Kigali
**APR**	Kigali
Bugesera	Bugesera
Etincelles F.C.	Gisenyi
Gasogi United	Kigali
Gorilla	Kigali
Kiyovu Sports	Kigali
Marines	Gisenyi
Muhazi United	Rwamagana
Mukura Victory Sports F.C.	Butare
Musanze F.C.	Ruhengeri
Police	Kibungo
Rayon Sports F.C.	Butare
Rutsiro	Rutsiro
Vision	Kigali

== São Tomé and Príncipe ==
- Country: São Tomé and Príncipe
- Football association: São Toméan Football Federation
- Top-level league: São Tomé and Príncipe Championship

As of 2024 season

=== São Tomé Championship ===
Club	City
6 de Setembro	Santana
**Agrosport**	Monte Café
Aliança Nacional	Pantufo
Bairros Unidos FC	Caixão Grande
CD Guadalupe	Guadalupe
FC Neves	Neves
Inter Bom-Bom	Bombom
Juba Diogo Simão	Diogo Simão
Sporting Praia Cruz	São Tomé
Trindade FC	Trindade
UD Rei Amador	São João dos Angolares
Vitória FC	São Tomé

=== Príncipe Championship ===
Club	City
1º de Maio	Nova Estrela
FC Porto Real	Porto Real
GD Os Operários	Santo António
Sporting Príncipe	Santo António
Sundy	Sundy
UDAPB	Santo António

== Senegal ==
- Country: Senegal
- Football association: Senegalese Football Federation
- Top-level league: Ligue 1

As of 2024-25 season

Club	City
AJEL	Rufisque
AS Dakar Sacré-Cœur	Dakar
AS Pikine	Pikine
ASC HLM	Dakar
ASC Jaraaf	Dakar
ASC Linguère	Saint-Louis
Casa Sports	Ziguinchor
Génération Foot	Dakar
Guédiawaye FC	Dakar
Jamono Fatick	Fatick
Oslo FA	Dakar
Sonacos	Diourbel
**Teungueth**	Rufisque
US Gorée	Dakar
US Ouakam	Dakar
Wally Daan	Thies

== Seychelles ==
- Country: Seychelles
- Football association: Seychelles Football Federation
- Top-level league: Seychelles Premier League

Season 2024-25

Club	City
Anse Réunion FC	Anse Réunion
Côte d'Or FC	Praslin
Foresters	Mont Fleuri
La Passe FC	La Passe
Light Stars FC	Grande Anse
Northern Dynamo	Glacis
PTL Bazar Brothers	Pointe La Rue
Real Maldive	Anse Etoile
**Saint Louis Suns United**	Victoria
St Michel United FC	Anse-aux-Pins

== Sierra Leone ==
- Country: Sierra Leone
- Football association: Sierra Leone Football Association
- Top-level league: Sierra Leone National Premier League

As 2024-25

Club	City
Abacha City	Freetown
Bai Bureh Warriors	Port Loko
Bhantal	Freetown
**Bo Rangers**	Bo
Bullom Stars	Lungi
Diamond Stars F.C.	Koidu Town
East End Lions F.C.	Freetown
Freetonians SLIFA	Freetown
Freetown City F.C.	Freetown
Kallon F.C.	Freetown
Kamboi Eagles	Kenema
Luawa	Freetown
Mighty Blackpool	Freetown
Old Edwardians F.C.	Freetown
Ports Authority F.C.	Freetown
Star Sport Academy	Freetown
Wilberforce Strikers	Freetown
Wusum Stars	Makeni

== Somalia ==
- Country: Somalia
- Football association: Somali Football Federation
- Top-level league: Somali National League

As of 2024-25 season:

Club	City
Badbaado	Mogadishu
**Dekedaha FC**	Mogadishu
Elman FC	Mogadishu
Gaadiidka FC	Mogadishu
Gasko FC	Mogadishu
Heegan FC	Mogadishu
Horseed FC	Horseed
KIGS SC	Mogadishu
Jeenyo United FC	Mogadishu
Madbacada FC	Mogadishu
Mogadishu City Club	Mogadishu
Raadsan SC	Mogadishu

== South Africa ==
- Country: South Africa
- Football association: South African Football Association
- Top-level league: South African Premiership

As of 2025–26 season:

Location of teams in the 2025–26 Premiership.

Club	City
AmaZulu F.C.	Durban
Chippa United	East London
Durban City	Durban
Lamontville Golden Arrows	Umlazi
Kaizer Chiefs	Johannesburg
Magesi	Moletjie
**Mamelodi Sundowns**	Pretoria
Marumo Gallants	Bloemfontein
Orlando Pirates	Johannesburg
Polokwane City	Polokwane
Richards Bay	Richards Bay
Orbit College F.C.	Rustenburg
Sekhukhune United	Polokwane
Siwelele	Bloemfontein
Stellenbosch	Stellenbosch
TS Galaxy F.C.	Mbombela

== South Sudan ==
- Country: South Sudan
- Football association: South Sudan Football Association
- Top-level league: South Sudan Premier League

As of 2024-25

Club	City
Al Hilal	Wau
Al-Malakia FC	Juba
**Al Merreikh Juba**	Juba
Bentiu City	Bentiu
Holy Family	Rumbek
Jumas	Juba
Kator	Juba
Koryom	Bor
Lion Hunters	Yei
Nile City	Yambio
Olympics	Renk
Salaam Aweil FC	Aweil
Wajuma	Aweil
Young Stars	Torit

== Sudan ==
- Country: Sudan
- Football association: Sudan Football Association
- Top-level league: Sudan Premier League

As of 2024-25 season

=== Group East ===
Club	City
Al-Hilal Al-Manaqil	Al Manaqil
Al-Mirghani	Kassala
Al-Shorta Al-Qadarif	Al-Gadarif
Hay Al-Arab	Port Sudan
Hilal Al-Sahil	Port Sudan

=== Group West ===
Club	City
Al-Merreikh El Obeid	El Obeid
Al-Merreikh Nyala	Nyala
Al-Rabita	Kosti
Haidob En Nahud	En Nahud
Hilal Al-Fasher	Al-Fashir
Zamala	Umm Ruwaba

=== Group North ===
Club	City
Al-Ahli Merowe	Merowe
Hay Al Wadi	Nyala
Kober	Khartoum
Umm Mughad Al-Kamlin	Al Kamlin

=== Group Nile River ===
Club	City
Al Ahli Khartoum	Khartoum
Al-Ahli Wad Madani	Wad Medani
Al-Ahly Shendi	Shendi
Al-Fallah	Atbara
Al-Amal	Atbara

== Tanzania ==
- Country: Tanzania
- Football association: Tanzania Football Federation
- Top-level league: Tanzanian Premier League
- As of 2024-25 season
Location of clubs in Tanzania for the 2024–25 Tanzanian Premier League season

Club	City
Azam F.C.	Dar es Salaam
Coastal Union F.C.	Tanga
Dodoma Jiji	Dodoma City
JKT Tanzania	Dar es Salaam
Kagera Sugar F.C.	Bukoba
KenGold	Chunya
Kinondoni MC	Kinondoni
Mashujaa	Kigoma
Namungo	Lindi
Pamba Jiji	Mwanza
Prisons	Mbeya
Simba	Dar es Salaam
Singida Black Stars	Singida
Singida Fountain Gate	Singida
Tabora United	Tabora
**Young Africans S.C.**	Dar es Salaam

== Togo ==
- Country: Togo
- Football association: Togolese Football Federation
- Top-level league: Togolese Championnat National

As of 2024-25 season

Club	City
AC Barracuda	Lomé
AS Binah	Pagouda
AS OTR	Lomé
ASC Kara	Kara
**ASKO Kara**	Kara
CDF Haknour	Bafilo
Doumbé FC	Mango
Entente II	Lomé
Espoir	Tsévié
Étoile Filante	Lomé
Gbohloé-su des Lacs	Aného
Gomido FC	Kpalime
Tambo FC	Datcha
Unisport de Sokodé	Sokodé

== Tunisia ==
- Country: Tunisia
- Football association: Tunisian Football Federation
- Top-level league: Tunisian Ligue Professionnelle 1

As of 2024-25 season

Locations of the 2024–25 Ligue 1 teams

Club	City
AS Gabès	Gabès
AS Soliman	Soliman
CA Bizertin	Bizerte
Club Africain	Tunis
CS Sfaxien	Sfax
EGS Gafsa	Gafsa
ES Métlaoui	Métlaoui
**Espérance de Tunis**	Tunis
Espérance de Zarzis	Zarzis
Étoile du Sahel	Sousse
JS El Omrane	Tunis (El Omrane)
Olympique Béja	Béja
Stade Tunisien	Tunis
US Ben Guerdane	Ben Guerdane
US Monastir	Monastir
US Tataouine	Tataouine

== Uganda ==
- Country: Uganda
- Football association: Federation of Uganda Football Associations
- Top-level league: Uganda Premier League

As of 2024-25 season

Locations of the 2024–25 Uganda Premier League clubs

Club	City
Bright Stars FC	Kampala
BIDCO Bul FC	Jinja
Express FC	Kampala
Kampala City Council FC	Kampala
Kitara	Hoima
Lugazi	Lugazi
Maroons FC	Kampala
Mbale Heroes	Mbale
Mbarara City FC	Mbarara
National Enterprises Corporation	Bugoloobi
Police FC	Kampala
**SC Villa**	Kampala
Uganda People's Defense Force	Lugazi
Uganda Revenue Authority SC	Kampala
Vipers SC	Wakiso Town
Wakiso Giants	Wakiso

== Zambia ==
- Country: Zambia
- Football association: Football Association of Zambia
- Top-level league: Zambia Super League

As of 2024-25 season

Club	City
Atletico Lusaka	Lusaka
Forest Rangers	Ndola
Green Buffaloes	Lusaka
Green Eagles	Kabwe
Indeni FC	Ndola
Kabwe Warriors	Kabwe
Lumwana Radiants	Kalumbila District
Mufulira Wanderers	Mufulira
Mutondo Stars	Kitwe
MUZA	Mazabuka
NAPSA Stars	Lusaka
Nchanga Rangers	Chingola
Nkana FC	Kitwe
Nkwazi	Lusaka
Power Dynamos	Kitwe
**Red Arrows**	Lusaka
Zanaco	Lusaka
ZESCO United	Ndola

== Zanzibar ==
- Country: Zanzibar
- Football association: Zanzibar Football Association
- Top-level league: Zanzibar Premier League

As of 2024-25 season

Club	City
Chipukizi	Pemba
Inter Zanzibar	Unguja
**JKU**	Unguja
Junguni United	Pemba
Kipanga	Unguja
KMKM FC	Zanzibar City
KVZ	Unguja
Mafunzo FC	Unguja
Malindi FC	Unguja
Mlandege FC	Unguja
Muembe Makumbi City	Unguja
Mwenge SC	Pemba
New City FC	Unguja
Tekeleza	Pemba
Uhamiaji	Unguja
Zimamoto	Unguja

== Zimbabwe ==
- Country: Zimbabwe
- Football association: Zimbabwe Football Association
- Top-level league: Zimbabwe Premier Soccer League

As of 2026 season:

Club	City
Agama	Mount Darwin
Bulawayo Chiefs	Bulawayo
CAPS United	Harare
Chicken Inn	Bulawayo
Dynamos	Harare
FC Platinum	Zvishavane
Hardrock	Kwekwe
Herentals	Harare
Highlanders	Bulawayo
F.C. Hunters	Marondera
Manica Diamonds	Mutare
MWOS	Norton
Ngezi Platinum	Ngezi
**Scottland**	Mabvuku
Simba Bhora	Shamva
TelOne	Gweru
Triangle United	Triangle
ZPC Kariba	Kariba

== See also ==
- List of top-division football clubs in AFC countries
- List of top-division football clubs in CONCACAF countries
- List of top-division football clubs in CONMEBOL countries
- List of top-division football clubs in OFC countries
- List of top-division football clubs in UEFA countries
- List of top-division football clubs in non-FIFA countries
