= 2015–16 Somali First Division =

Somali First Division
- Season: 2015–16
- Champions: Banadir
- Relegated: Mogadishu City; Sahafi
- 2017 CAF Champions League: Banadir
- Matches: 180
- Goals: 255 (1.42 per match)
- Biggest home win: Sahafi 12–1 Mogadishu City (15 May 2016)
- Biggest away win: 2 matches: Mogadishu City 0–7 LLPP (15 March 2016); Mogadishu City 1-8 Heegan (21 March 2016)
- Highest scoring: Sahafi 12–1 Mogadishu City (15 May 2016)
- Longest winning run: Dekedda (5)
- Longest unbeaten run: Banadir (18)
- Longest winless run: Mogadishu City (18)
- Longest losing run: Mogadishu City (11)
- All statistics correct as of 15 May 2016.

The 2015–16 Somali First Division is the 43rd season of top-tier football in Somalia. The season began on 28 December 2015 and concluded on 15 May 2016. Benadir SC was atop the table nearly the entire season to win their sixth league title.

The league is comprised 10 teams, the bottom two of which - Sahafi and Mogadishu City - will be relegated to the 2016-17 Somali Second Division.

== Teams ==
A total of 10 teams will contest the league, including eight sides from the 2014–15 season and two promoted from the 2014–15 Somali Second Division, Mogadishu City and Singjet FC. On the other hand, Somali Fruit and Savana FC were the last two teams of the 2014–15 season and will play in Second Division for the 2015-16 season. Heegan FC are the defending champions from the 2014–15 season.

== League table ==
Pos	Team	Pld	W	D	L	GF	GA	GD	Pts	Qualification or relegation
1	Banadir (C)	18	12	6	0	36	8	+28	42	2017 CAF Champions League
2	Dekedda	18	10	6	2	28	15	+13	36	2017 CECAFA Club Cup and 2016–17 Arab Club Championship
3	LLPP	18	9	6	3	37	19	+18	33	
4	Heegan	18	7	9	2	31	14	+17	30	
5	Elman	18	6	6	6	20	17	+3	24	
6	Gaadiidka	18	6	6	6	18	16	+2	24	
7	Horseed	18	6	5	7	23	27	−4	23	
8	Singjet	18	4	3	11	20	35	−15	15	
9	Sahafi (R)	18	3	4	11	30	38	−8	13	Relegation to 2016-17 Somali Second Division
10	Mogadishu City (R)	18	0	3	15	12	66	−54	3	Relegation to 2016-17 Somali Second Division

Updated to match(es) played on 15 May 2016. Source: soccerway.com
Rules for classification: 1) points; 2) playoff (only for deciding champion and relegation); 3) goal difference; 4) goals scored
(C) Champions; (R) Relegated

== Positions by round ==
Leader
Relegation to Ligue 2

Team ╲ Round	1	2	3	4	5	6	7	8	9	10	11	12	13	14	15	16	17	18
Banadir	1	1	1	1	1	2	1	1	1	1	1	1	1	1	1	1	1	1
Dekedda	1	4	2	2	2	1	2	3	3	5	5	4	4	3	3	3	2	2
LLPP	3	2	3	4	3	3	3	2	2	2	2	2	2	2	2	2	3	3
Heegan	9	6	4	7	6	5	5	4	5	3	3	3	3	4	4	4	4	4
Elman	3	3	4	3	5	6	7	7	6	6	6	6	6	5	6	6	5	5
Gaadiidka	3	7	7	6	4	4	4	5	4	4	4	5	5	6	5	5	6	6
Horseed	3	5	8	5	7	7	6	6	7	7	7	7	7	7	7	7	7	7
Singjet	9	9	6	8	9	9	9	8	8	9	9	9	9	9	9	8	8	8
Sahafi	3	7	9	9	8	8	8	9	9	8	8	8	8	8	8	9	9	9
Mogadishu City	3	10	10	10	10	10	10	10	10	10	10	10	10	10	10	10	10	10

Updated to match(es) played on 15 May 2016. Source: Soccerway
