= 2013–14 Somali First Division =

Somalia League
- Season: 2013–14
- Champions: BS Club
- Biggest home win: Elman FC 8–0 Savana FC
- Biggest away win: Horseed FC 0–3 Dekedda FC

Somalia League is the top division of the Somali Football. The competitions was created in 1960. 8 teams contested the league in 2013–2014.

== Teams ==
Club	Location	Stadium
Savaana	Mogadishu	Banadir Stadium
Elman FC	Mogadishu	Mogadiscio Stadium
BS Club	Mogadishu	Mogadiscio Stadium
Heegan	Mogadishu	Banadir Stadium
Gaadiidka	Mogadishu	Banadir Stadium
Jeenyo United	Mogadishu	Banadir Stadium
Dekedda FC	Mogadishu	Banadir Stadium
Horseed FC	Horseed	Horseed Stadium

== League table ==
Team	Points
1 BS Club (C)	31
2 Elman FC	25
3 Jeenyo United	23
4 Heegan	23
5 Horseed FC	16
6 Dekedda FC	12
7 Gaadiidka	9
8 Savaana	4
9 ALBA FC	4
