= 2019–20 Somali First Division =

Somali First Division
- Season: 2020

The 2020 Somali First Division is the 47th season of the Somali First Division, the top-tier football league in Somalia. The season started on 25 December 2019.

== Teams ==
Team	Location	Stadium	Capacity
Dekedaha	Mogadishu	Banadir Stadium	20,000
Elman	Mogadishu	Banadir Stadium	20,000
Gaadiidka	Mogadishu	Banadir Stadium	20,000
Heegan	Mogadishu	Banadir Stadium	20,000
Horseed	Mogadishu	Banadir Stadium	20,000
Jazeera	Mogadishu	Banadir Stadium	20,000
Midnimo	Mogadishu	Banadir Stadium	20,000
Mogadishu City	Mogadishu	Mogadishu Stadium	60,000
Raadsan	Mogadishu	Banadir Stadium	20,000
Rajo	Mogadishu	Banadir Stadium	20,000

== Standings ==
Pos	Team	Pld	W	D	L	GF	GA	GD	Pts	Qualification or relegation
1	Mogadishu City (C)	18	10	6	2	42	15	+27	36	Qualification to 2020–21 CAF Champions League
2	Dekedaha	18	10	5	3	21	16	+5	35	
3	Elman	18	10	4	4	43	23	+20	34	
4	Horseed	18	9	7	2	32	12	+20	34	
5	Heegan	18	10	3	5	34	21	+13	33	
6	Gaadiidka	18	6	4	8	32	25	+7	22	
7	Midnimo	18	5	7	6	20	26	−6	22	
8	Raadsan	18	4	4	10	28	40	−12	16	
9	Rajo (R)	18	2	2	14	16	65	−49	8	Relegation to 2021 Somali Second Division
10	Jazeera (R)	18	1	4	13	19	44	−25	7	Relegation to 2021 Somali Second Division

Source: Soccerway
Rules for classification: 1) Points; 2) Goal difference; 3) Goals scored;
(C) Champions; (R) Relegated
