= 2016–17 Somali First Division =

Somali First Division
- Season: 2016–17
- Champions: Dekedaha FC

The 2016–17 Somali First Division is the 44th season of top-tier football in Somalia. The season began on 18 November 2016 and concluded on 2 August 2017.

== Standings ==
Pos	Team	Pld	W	D	L	GF	GA	GD	Pts
1	Dekedda SC (C)	18	11	6	1	39	11	+28	39
2	Banadir SC	18	10	4	4	33	14	+19	34
3	Elman FC	18	9	5	4	38	14	+24	32
4	Heegan FC	18	9	5	4	26	17	+9	32
5	Horseed SC	18	7	8	3	20	16	+4	29
6	Jeenyo FC	18	6	8	4	30	25	+5	26
7	Gaadiidka FC	18	6	6	6	40	20	+20	24
8	Waxool FC	18	3	3	12	14	40	−26	12
9	Barige Dhexe FC	18	3	2	13	10	47	−37	11
10	Mogadishu United	18	2	1	15	12	58	−46	7

Source: rsssf.com
(C) Champions
