= Anwar Shakunda =

Somali footballer

Personal information
- Full name: Anwar Sidali Shakunda
- Date of birth: 12 April 1999 (age 27)
- Place of birth: Somalia
- Position: Forward

Team information
- Current team: Horseed

Senior career*
Years	Team	Apps	(Gls)
- Jeenyo United
2018–2021	Elman		
2021	Dekedaha		
2021–	Horseed		

International career^{‡}
2019–	Somalia	5	(1)
- * Club domestic league appearances and goals as of 21:00, 15 September 2019 (UTC) ‡ National team caps and goals as of 17:47, 28 June 2021 (UTC)

Anwar Sidali Shakunda (Somali: Anwar Siid Cali Shakuunda; born 12 April 1999) is a Somali footballer who plays as a forward for Horseed and the Somalia national team.

== Club career ==
In 2018, Shakunda signed for Elman, joining from Jeenyo United. Shakunda was the Somali First Division top scorer in both 2018 and 2019. In 2021, Shakunda signed for Dekedaha. Later that year, Shakunda signed for Horseed.

== International career ==
On 5 September 2019, Shakunda made his debut for Somalia, scoring in a 1–0 win against Zimbabwe, marking Somalia's first ever FIFA World Cup qualification victory.

=== International goals ===
Scores and results list Somalia's goal tally first.

#	Date	Venue	Opponent	Score	Result	Competition
1	5 September 2019	El Hadj Hassan Gouled Aptidon Stadium, Djibouti City, Djibouti (Note: Played in Djibouti due to security concerns from the ongoing civil war.)	Zimbabwe	1–0	1–0	2022 FIFA World Cup qualification
