= 2018 Somali First Division =

Somali First Division
- Season: 2018
- Champions: Dekedaha FC

The 2018 Somali First Division is the 45th season of top-tier football in Somalia. The season began on 22 January and ended on 11 May 2018.

== Final standings ==
Pos	Team	Pld	W	D	L	GF	GA	GD	Pts	Qualification or relegation
1	Dekedaha FC	18	11	6	1	45	10	+35	39	Champions
2	Banadir SC	18	11	5	2	39	19	+20	38	
3	Heegan FC	18	10	6	2	36	11	+25	36	
4	Horseed SC	18	9	7	2	33	12	+21	34	
5	Elman FC	18	6	4	8	37	36	+1	22	
6	Jeenyo United FC	18	4	5	9	22	31	−9	17	
7	Gaadiidka FC	18	4	5	9	23	33	−10	17	
8	Madbacadda FC	18	3	8	7	16	34	−18	17	
9	Batroolka FC	18	2	6	10	16	46	−30	12	Relegation to lower division
10	Waxool FC	18	3	2	13	14	49	−35	11	Relegation to lower division

Updated to match(es) played on unknown. Source:
