= 2019 Somali First Division =

Somali First Division
- Season: 2019

The 2019 Somali First Division is the 46th season of the Somali First Division, the top-tier football league in Somalia. The season started on 7 February 2019.

== Standings ==
Final table.

Pos	Team	Pld	W	D	L	GF	GA	GD	Pts	Qualification or relegation
1	Dekedda SC	18	13	3	2	37	13	+24	42	Champions
2	Horseed SC	18	12	4	2	39	8	+31	40	
3	Elman FC	18	10	5	3	35	20	+15	35	
4	Heegan FC	18	9	5	4	27	13	+14	32	
5	Mogadishu City Club	18	7	5	6	31	22	+9	26	
6	Jazeera SC	18	5	6	7	27	35	−8	21	
7	Midnimo FC	18	5	3	10	10	25	−15	18	
8	Gaadiidka FC	18	5	3	10	17	34	−17	18	
9	Madbacada FC	18	3	4	11	13	29	−16	13	Relegated
10	Jeenyo FC	18	1	2	15	16	53	−37	5	Relegated

Source: rsssf.com
