= Said Mohamed Duale =

Somalian footballer (1947–2020)

Personal information
- Full name: Said Mohamed Duale Hogsade
- Date of birth: 18 September 1947
- Place of birth: Aden, Yemen
- Date of death: 1 April 2020 (aged 72)
- Place of death: Aden, Yemen
- Position: Forward

Senior career*
Years	Team	Apps	(Gls)
1962–1967	Al-Husseini		
1967–1970	Somali Police		
1971–1974	Horseed		
1975	Al Wahda		
1976–1977	Horseed		
1977–1978	Zamalek	0	(0)
- Al-Tilal

International career
1965	South Yemen		
1967–1978	Somalia		
- * Club domestic league appearances and goals

Said Mohamed Duale Hogsade (Somali: Siciid Maxamed Ducaale; 18 September 1947 – 1 April 2020) was a Somali international footballer.

== Early life ==
Duale was born in Aden, Yemen to a Somali father and Yemeni mother. His father's family originally hails from Erigavo, Somaliland. Along with his brother, Hussein, he fled Yemen during the North Yemen civil war, arriving in Somalia in either 1967 or 1968, according to conflicting reports.

== Career ==
Having played for Al-Husseini in South Yemen for six seasons, and representing the nation in 1965, Duale joined the Somali Police football team in either 1967 or 1968 following his arrival in Somalia. His performances were so highly commended that he was named as a First Lieutenant in the Somali Police Force by Commander Mohamed Abshir Muse. He was signed by Horseed in 1971, and went on to win the Somali First Division on multiple occasions, as well as the General Da'ud Cup. He was reportedly offered the chance to play in Italy by one of the club's Italian coaches, though the Somali Democratic Republic blocked the move.

In 1975, he joined United Arab Emirates club Al Wahda, signing a one-year deal. He returned to Somalia after this, re-joining Horseed, before a move to Egypt to sign for Egyptian Premier League club Zamalek. No records of him playing in a competitive fixture for Zamalek exist, and he finished his career in Yemen with Al-Tilal, where he spent the majority of his career, as both a player and coach.

== Style of play ==
Former Jeenyo United player Seyga Ruushka, who played against Duale, described him as an efficient striker, stating "he only needed to find the ball even if it was three times only out of the 90 minutes. Those three times, to be certain, would convert to at least 2 goals. That is all he needed." He was also known for his free-kick taking ability.

== Death ==
Duale died in 2020, following a short illness. A prayer session was held in Mogadishu, Somalia for Duale and former international teammate Ibrahim Mohamed Hersi, as well as fellow footballer Mohamed Farah, who both died shortly before Duale.
