= Somalia Super Cup =

The Somalia Super Cup is the football super cup competition in Somalia, played between the winners of the Somali First Division and the Somalia Cup.

== Results ==
Year	Winner	Score	Runner-up
2013	Elman FC	1–1 (5–4 pen.)	Benadir SC
2014	Jeenyo United FC	2–2 (5–4 pen.)	Benadir SC
2015	Horseed FC	0–0 (3–1 pen.)	Heegan FC
2016	Benadir SC	1–1 (3–2 pen.)	Jeenyo United FC
2017	Elman FC	1–0	Dekedaha FC
2018	Dekedaha FC	3–0	Mogadishu City Club (formerly Benadir SC)
2019	Dekedaha FC	3–0	Mogadishu City Club
2020	Not held		
2021	Horseed FC	2–0	Mogadishu City Club
2022	Not held		
2023	Dekedaha FC	3–2	Gaadiidka
2024	Mogadishu City Club	4–1	Dekedaha FC
