= Football in Somalia =

- Country: Somalia
- Governing body: Somali Football Federation
- National team: national football team

Club competitions
- Somalia League

International competitions
- Champions League; CAF Confederation Cup; Super Cup; FIFA Club World Cup; FIFA World Cup(National Team); African Cup of Nations(National Team)

Football in Somalia is run by the Somali Football Federation. (: الصومال لكرة القدم)The association administers the national football team, as well as the Premier League. Football is the most popular sport in Somalia. Approximately one in five people in Somalia are considered association football fans.

== History ==
Football was introduced in Somalia by the Italians, as an amateur sport activity of colonial Mogadishu & surroundings in the late 1920s. In the 1930s, Italian authorities began to organize professional sport in Somalia. These sports were initially concentrated only in the capital Mogadishu.

Championships were already organised during Italian colonial rule (at least between 1932/33 and 1939/40) but no further data are known apart from the participating (Italian) clubs in 1937/38 and 1939/40.The first Somali clubs were established around the 1940s, but no organised leagues were held. One of the main teams was called Bondhere (earlier called SYL "Leego"), established by the SYL (Somali Youth League), which won one of the first competitions" under Somali management in 1958.Other early Somali clubs to be established were the transport team ("Autoparco"), the Public Works Department ("Lavori Pubblici"/Jeenyo), Shibis, Hamarweyne, and Wardhiigley. These teams later changed names. Gaadiidka (then known as Autobar, possibly identical to Autoparco) reportedly won three successive titles between 1955 and 1957, remaining unbeaten in 1956. The police and military teams became the strongest ones, and as matches between them resulted in conflict and tensions, they were eventually combined to form "Horseed".

In 1931 governor Maurizio Rava created the Federazione Sportiva della Somalia, which organized competences of football for the Italian community and promoted the first sport activities among the young native population. In 1933 the first Somali football championship was created in Mogadishu, called Coppa Federazione Sportiva, with three teams ("Societa' Mogadiscio", "Milizia" and the winner "Marina"). In 1938 the football championship was won by the "Amaruini" team, made up mainly of local Somalis; in 1939 the winning team was the "Araba".

The full Somali Football teams were established initially around the second half of the 1940s: their competitions were not well organised, but these activities are credited for the initiating of the "Somali liberation movement". The Somali Youth League was indeed an organization created by thirteen young men and Football was then one of their common interests. SYL had established a strong team from the locals to play the Italian teams after WWII: this team had to change its name to "Bondhere" (later won the first competitions held under the full Somali management in 1958 when the first Somali commissioner for sport was established).

In 1955 -during the Trust Territory of Somalia under Italian administration- was created the first football stadium in Mogadishu: the Coni Stadium, later called Banadir Stadium. The teams that played a Trust Territory of Somalia championship with the stadium inauguration were: "Lavori Publici", "Autoparco", "El Gab", "Sicurezza", "Somali Police FC" and "AS Mogadiscio" (the former AC Mogadiscio, that won the championship in 1947).

The first Somali National Football team travelled to Mombasa, Kenya around 1957/8 and lost by five goals to nil (5-0).

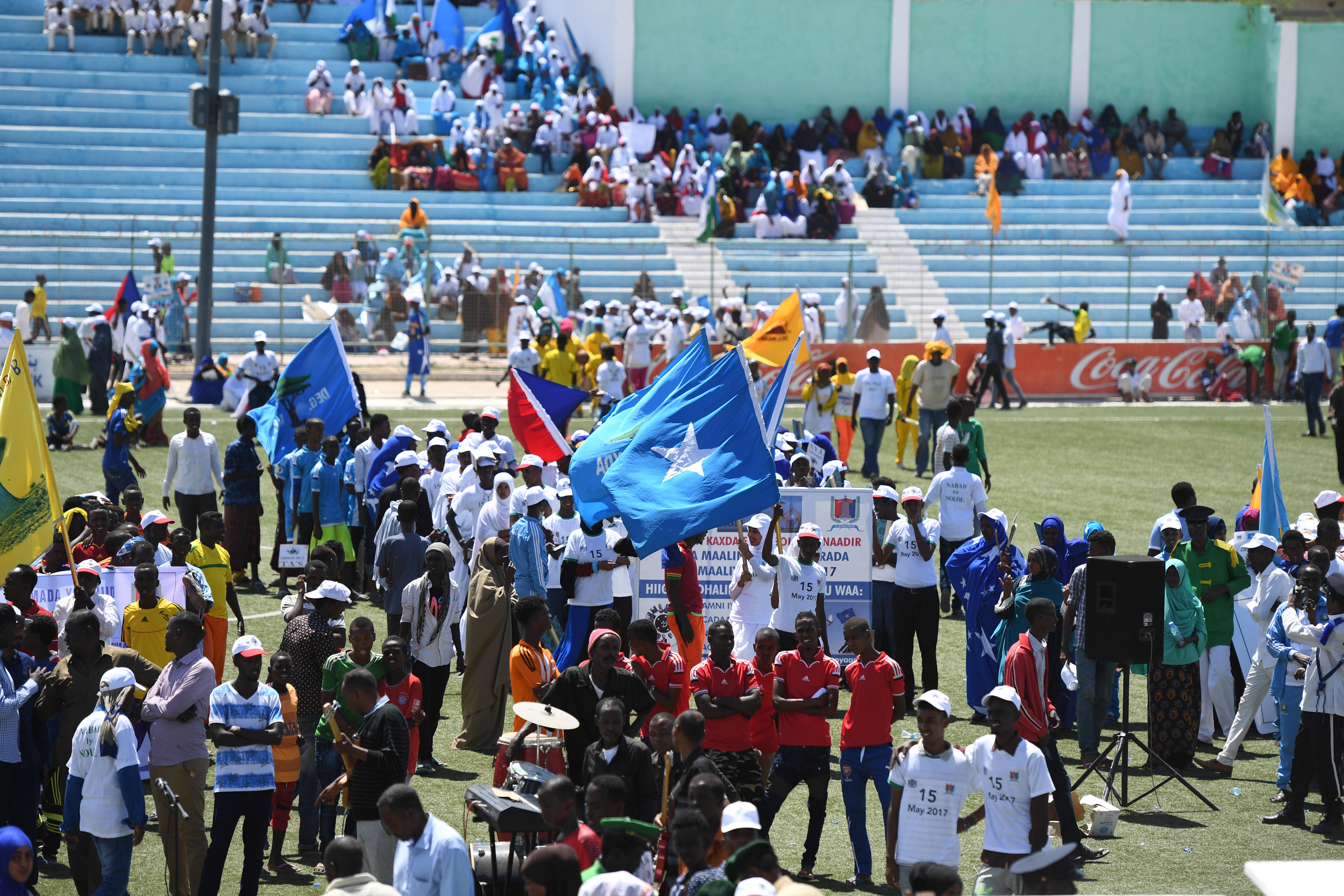
Banadir Stadium

In 1967 started the official "Somali championship" and the first was won by the Somali Police FC of Mogadishu (called "Booliska" in Somali language). The next championships were won by Hoga of Mogadishu (or Xoogga) in 1968, by Lavori Pubblici FC of Mogadishu (or "Jeenyo/LLPP") in 1969-1970-1971 and by Horseed FC of Horseed near Merca in 1972.

The Somali Football Federation (SFF) was founded in 1951. In 1962, the SFF became a FIFA member. It later joined the Confederation of African Football (CAF) in 1968 and the Union of Arab Football Associations (UAFA) in 1974. The SFF is responsible for organizing matches between local teams and enforcing rules and regulations of the game during matches. The Federation is also in charge of the National Football Team, League and Cup.

In 2010, the Mire Aware Stadium in Garowe hosted the Somali National Football Tournament, the first nationwide football competition held since 1987. Organized by the autonomous Puntland administration in conjunction with the Somali Football Federation, the tournament also marked the first time that the event was held outside Mogadishu.

== League system ==
Level	League(s)/Division(s)
1	Heerka Koowaad; 10 clubs
2	Heerka Labaad; 8 clubs
3	Heerka Saddexaad; 8 clubs

== Football stadiums in Somalia ==
#	Stadium	Capacity	City	Tenants	Image
1	Mogadishu Stadium	65,000	Mogadishu	Somalia national football team	
2	Hargeisa Stadium	30,000	Hargeisa		
3	Eng. Yariisow Stadium	20,000	Mogadishu		
4	Horseed Stadium	10,000	Mogadishu		

== Attendances ==
The top-flight football league clubs from Somalia sorted by average home league attendance in 2021:

#	Football club	Average attendance
1	Horseed SC	7,533
2	Mogadishu City Club	2,512
3	Heegan FC	2,032
4	Raadsan SC	917
5	Dekedaha FC	907
6	Gaadiidka FC	698
7	Midnimo FC	654
8	Jeenyo United FC	567
9	Elman SC	520
10	Geeska Afrika FC	321
Average per club		1,788

== See also ==
- Lists of stadiums
