= Ibrahim Abdi Mohamed =

Somali footballer (born 2000)

Personal information
- Date of birth: 2000 (age 25–26)
- Place of birth: Somalia
- Position: Defender

Team information
- Current team: Horseed

Senior career*
Years	Team	Apps	(Gls)
- Gaadiidka
- Horseed

International career^{‡}
2019–	Somalia	2	(0)
- * Club domestic league appearances and goals as of 19:00, 15 September 2019 (UTC) ‡ National team caps and goals as of 19:00, 15 September 2019 (UTC)

Ibrahim Abdi Mohamed (born 2000) is a Somali footballer who plays as a defender for Horseed.

== Club career ==
Prior to joining Somali First Division club Horseed, Mohamed played for Gaadiidka.

== International career ==
On 27 July 2019, Mohamed made his debut for Somalia in a 3–1 loss against Uganda during the 2020 African Nations Championship qualification stage.
