= Said Aweys Ali =

Somali footballer (born 2000)

Personal information
- Full name: Said Aweys Ali
- Date of birth: 1 January 2000 (age 26)
- Place of birth: Somalia
- Position: Goalkeeper

Senior career*
Years	Team	Apps	(Gls)
2016–2017	Waxool		
2018–	Mogadishu City Club		

International career^{‡}
2019–	Somalia	6	(0)
- * Club domestic league appearances and goals as of 20:00, 14 September 2019 (UTC) ‡ National team caps and goals as of 20:00, 14 September 2019 (UTC)

Said Aweys Ali (born 1 January 2000) is a Somali professional footballer who plays as a goalkeeper for Mogadishu City Club.

== Club career ==
Ali began his career at Somali First Division club Waxool, before joining Banadir in 2018, who were renamed to Mogadishu City Club the following season.

== International career ==
On 5 September 2019, Ali made his debut for Somalia, keeping a clean sheet in a 1–0 win against Zimbabwe. The win marked Somalia's first ever FIFA World Cup qualification victory.
