= Somalia national beach soccer team =

National sports team

Somalia
- Association: Somali Football Federation
- Confederation: CAF (Africa)
- Head coach: Ibrahim Mohamed
- FIFA code: SOM
First colours
Second colours

The Somalia national beach soccer team represents Somalia in international beach soccer competitions and is controlled by the SFF, the governing body for professional football in Somalia.

== Current squad ==
As of July 2009

Note: Flags indicate national team as defined under FIFA eligibility rules; some limited exceptions apply. Players may hold more than one non-FIFA nationality.

No.	Pos.	Nation	Player
1	GK		Adurahman Munir
2	FW		Samatar Mustafa
3	DF		Mukhtar Abdi
4	DF		Mohamed Jamal
5	DF		Kropf Pascal
6	FW		Abukar Mohamed

No.	Pos.	Nation	Player
7	FW		Xaaji Nuur Maxamed
8	DF		Abas Geesey
9	FW		Abdi Hamdi
10	FW		Abdulkadir Khadar
11	FW		Liban"Fanax" Muhidin

Coach: Ahmed Mohamed Ahmed

== Achievements ==
- GE Money Beach Soccer Tour African Game vs. Senegal

== See also ==
- Somalia national football team
- Somali Football Federation
- Somalia League
- Somalia Cup
