= Sahafi FC =

Somali football club

- Full name: Sahafi Football Club
- Ground: Banadir Stadium; Mogadishu, Somalia
- Capacity: 20,000
- League: Somalia Second League
- 2023–2024: 12th place
| Home colours | Away colours |

Sahafi Football Club (Arabic: نادي الصحفي لكرة القدم) is a Somali football club based in Mogadishu, Somalia. They were the Somalia Cup winners in 2007. They played in the Somalia League in 2012.

== History ==
The club was found under the name of SITT Daallo. It changed the name into Sahafi FC in 2012.

== Achievements ==
- Somalia Cup: 1

2007

== Performance in UAFA competitions ==
- Arab Champions League : 1 appearances

2012–13 – First round
