= Yusuf Ali Nur =

Somali footballer and coach (born 1978)

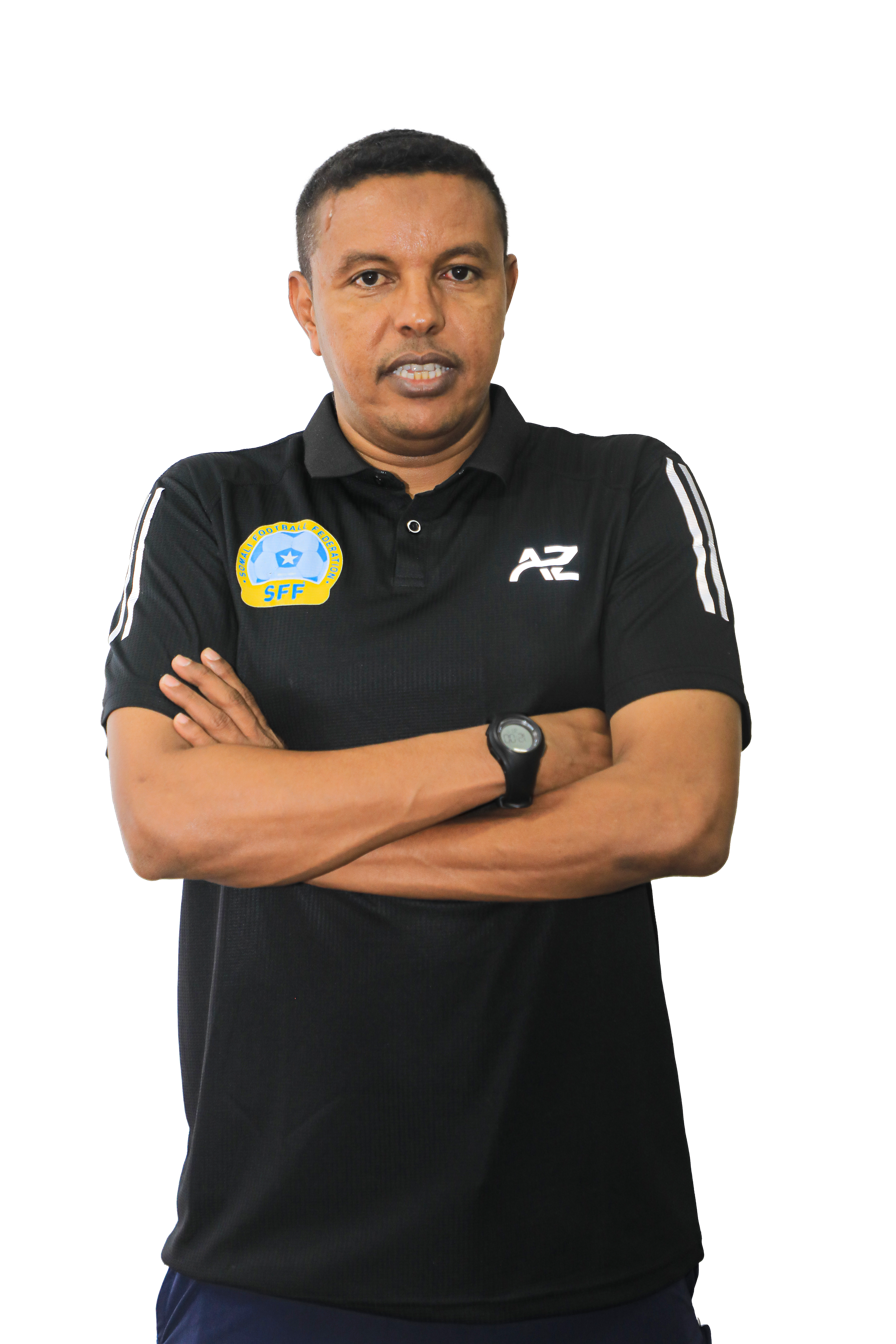

Personal information
- Date of birth: 11 October 1978 (age 48)
- Place of birth: Mogadishu, Somalia
- Position: Attacking midfielder

Senior career*
Years	Team	Apps	(Gls)
–1996	HACHS		(1)
1997–2010	Elman		

International career
2003–2009	Somalia	8	(0)

Managerial career
- 2010–2012: Somalia
- 2010–2015: Elman
- 2015–2021: Dekedaha
- 2025-Present: Somalia
- * Club domestic league appearances and goals

Yusuf Ali Nur (born 11 October 1978) is a Somali football coach and former player who played as an attacking midfielder. He is the head coach of the Somalia national football team, also known as the Ocean Stars. He previously played for Elman FC and represented Somalia at international level.

== Playing career ==
Nur began his playing career with HACHS before joining Elman FC in 1997. He remained with Elman until his retirement from playing in 2010. During his playing career, he was also a captain of the Somalia national team and represented the country internationally.

=== Oman vs Somalia ===
On 26 November 2025, Somalia faced Oman in the qualification play-off for the 2025 FIFA Arab Cup in Doha, Qatar.

The match ended 0–0 after 90 minutes and remained goalless after extra time. The qualification place was therefore decided by a penalty shoot-out. Oman won 4–1 on penalties to qualify for the group stage of the FIFA Arab Cup Qatar 2025, while Somalia were eliminated. FIFA reported that Somalia pushed Oman all the way to the penalty shoot-out after a goalless match.

The match was one of Somalia's most competitive international fixtures of 2025 and was played during the tenure of head coach Yusuf Ali Nur. Somalia's defensive performance kept Oman scoreless for 120 minutes before the match was ultimately decided from the penalty spot.

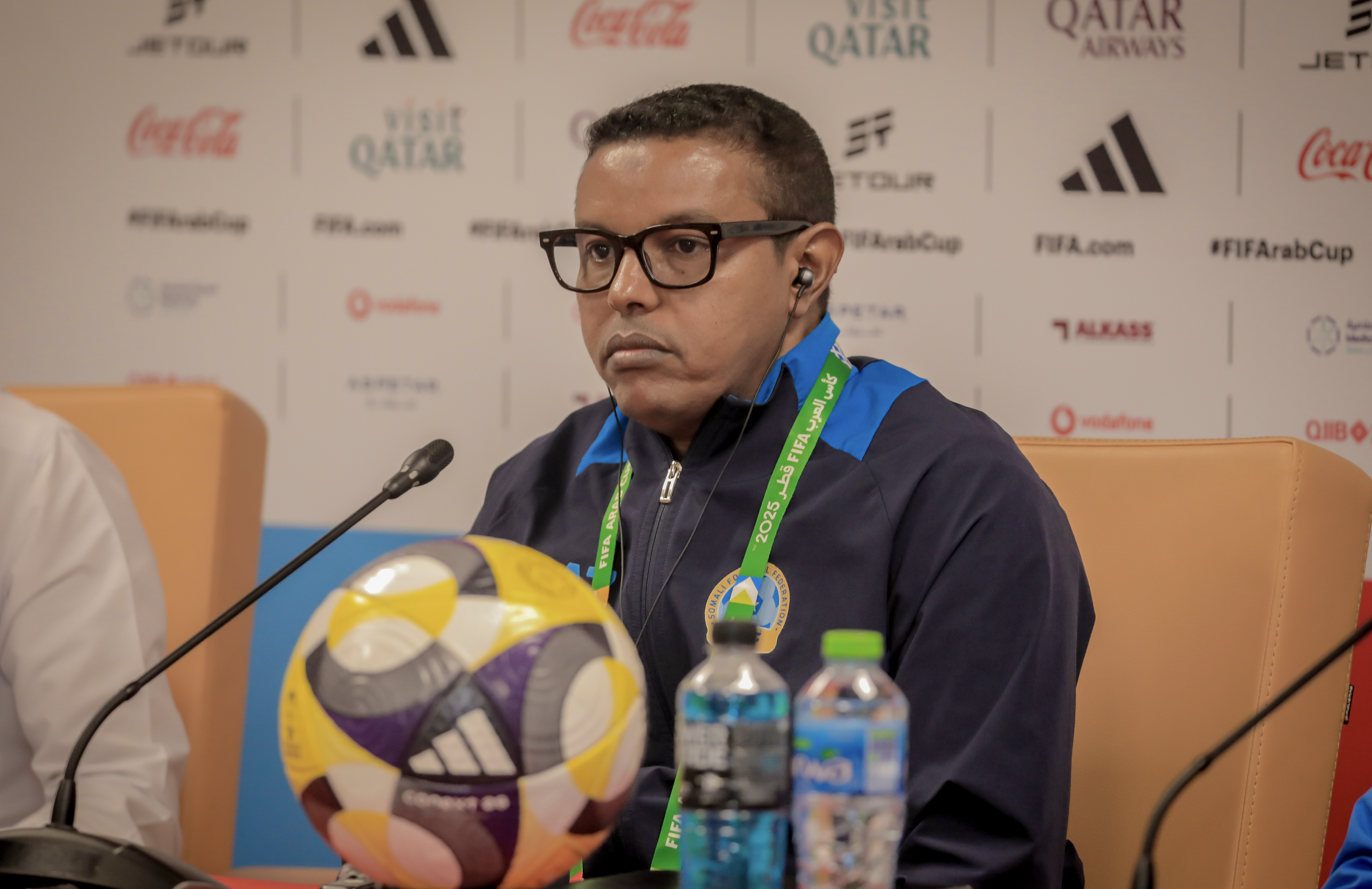
Head Coach - Ocean Stars.

=== November 2025 Bahrain friendlies ===
Under Nur, Somalia recorded two victories over Bahrain in international friendly matches in November 2025. On 17 November 2025, Somalia defeated Bahrain 2–1 at the Bahrain National Stadium in Riffa. Bahrain took the lead through Mohamed Al-Romaihi in the 35th minute, before Mohamed Omar equalised for Somalia shortly before half-time. Ciise Aadan Marsis scored the winning goal in the second half. Four days later, on 21 November 2025, Somalia defeated Bahrain 1–0 in another international friendly in Bahrain. The result gave Somalia consecutive victories over the same opponent during the November international window. The two victories were significant for Somalia, coming during a period in which the national team was seeking to rebuild its confidence and improve its international results. FIFA had previously reported that Somalia were looking to end a long winless run and that the squad was undergoing a new cycle under Nur.

=== International management ===
Nur continued as Somalia head coach into 2026. In March 2026, the Confederation of African Football (CAF) referred to him as Somalia's head coach during the 2027 Africa Cup of Nations qualifying campaign. CAF reported that Somalia showed defensive discipline and growing confidence under Nur during their two-legged preliminary-round tie against Mauritius. The Somalia national football team lists Yusuf Ali Nur as its head coach.

== Managerial career ==
After retiring as a player in 2010, Nur moved into coaching. He began his managerial career with the Somalia national team before working with Elman FC. During his time with Elman, he won domestic honours and later managed Dekedaha, where he also achieved success in Somali domestic football. Nur returned to the Somalia national team as head coach in 2025. His appointment marked the beginning of a new cycle for the national team, with a greater emphasis on developing a younger squad and integrating players from the Somali diaspora. FIFA described the team under Nur as being in a new project and cycle ahead of the 2025 FIFA Arab Cup qualifying campaign.

After coaching the Somalia national team, Ali Nur joined his former team Elman as coach and won two league titles and a super cup.

In 2015, Ali Nur left Elman and joined Dekedaha, where he continued winning titles: he won three consecutive titles with in 2017, 2018 and 2019.

After five years with Dekedaha, Ali Nur returned to Elman as a technical director in 2021.
