= Puntland State League =

Football league in Puntland, Somalia

- Founded: 2017
- Country: Puntland
- Number of clubs: 9
- Level on pyramid: A
- Current champions: Hombabaro F.C. (2023-24)

Puntland State League (Somali: Horyaalka Kubadda Cagta Puntland) is the top flight football league in Puntland, Somalia.

== History ==
In 2014, Puntland attempted to join FIFA. The Puntland State League was founded in 2017 with nine clubs. Bari FC won the inaugural season. A second-tier league with promotion was planned to be established by 2018. During the 2022 season, the first and second-placed clubs received money as rewards. The 2023/2024 Puntland State League Serie A concluded with Homboboro FC defeating Comsed FC in the men's final via a penalty shoot-out.
