= Wagad =

Somali football club

- Full name: Wagad Mogadishu
- Ground: Banadir Stadium; Mogadishu, Somalia
- Capacity: 20,000
- League: Somali Second Division

Wagad Mogadishu (Arabic: واجاد مقديشيو) is a Somali football club based in Mogadishu, Somalia which currently plays in Somali Second Division the second division of Somali Football.

== Stadium ==
Currently the team plays at the 20,000-capacity Banadir Stadium.

== Honours ==
- Somalia League

Champion (4): 1982, 1985, 1987, 1988
