= Ibrahim Mohamed Hersi =

Somalian-Eritrean footballer (1944–2020)

Personal information
- Date of birth: 29 June 1944
- Place of birth: Asmara, Eritrea or Kassala, Sudan
- Date of death: 14 March 2020 (aged 75)
- Place of death: Minneapolis, Minnesota, United States

Senior career*
Years	Team	Apps	(Gls)
- Saxil
- Dugale
- EEPCo Addis Abeba
- Red Sea Asmara
1967	Al-Taka Kassala		
1968	Al-Waha		
- Somali Police
1968–1978	Horseed		

International career
1968–1978	Somalia		

Managerial career
- 1976–1980: Horseed
- 1977–1979: Somalia
- * Club domestic league appearances and goals

Ibrahim Mohamed Hersi (Somali: Ibraahim Maxamed Hirxi; Arabic: إبراهيم محمد حرسي; 29 June 1944 – 14 March 2020) was a Somali international footballer.

== Career ==
Hersi was born in either Asmara, Eritrea, or Kassala, Sudan. Irrespective of his place of birth, his footballing career began in Ethiopia with Saxil and Dugale, before joining more established side EEPCo Addis Abeba. His last club in Ethiopia was Red Sea Asmara before moving to Sudan to represent Al-Taka Kassala and Al-Waha.

He moved to Somalia in 1968, and reportedly played for the Somali Police. It is known that he played for Horseed until his retirement 1978, though it is unclear exactly when he joined. He also managed Horseed from 1976, when he was still a player, until 1980. During this time, specifically between 1977 and 1979, he also managed the Somalia national football team.

== Personal life ==
Having fled to the United States in 1991 following conflict in Somalia, Hersi settled in Minneapolis, Minnesota, where he married and had three children: Muna, Munira and Mohamed, as well as several grandchildren.

== Death ==
Hersi died in 2020.
