= Jamhuuriya TB =

Somali football club

- Full name: Jamhuuriya Team Banooni
- League: Somali Second Division

Jamhuuriya Team Banooni is a Somali football club based in Gaalkacyo, Somalia. Previously they played in the Somali Third Division, and as of 2026 in the Somali Second Division.

== Achievements ==
Jamhuuriya TB reached the final of the Somalia cup, losing to Elman FC, and were the runner up of the 2017 Somalia cup.
