= Ciise Abshir =

Somali footballer (born 1986)

Personal information
- Full name: Ciise Aden Abshir
- Date of birth: 1 June 1986 (age 40)
- Place of birth: Mogadishu, Somalia
- Height: 1.86 m (6 ft 1 in)
- Position: Forward

Senior career*
Years	Team	Apps	(Gls)
2000–2003	Elman	140	(111)
2004	Simba	22	(19)
2005	Pietà Hotspurs	7	(3)
2006–2008	Lillestrøm SK 2	20	(+16)
2009–2010	Eidsvold Turn	41	(17)
2011	Elverum		
2012	Nybergsund	9	(2)
2012–2013	Asker	35	(10)
2014–2015	Eidsvold Turn	48	(9)
2016	KFUM Oslo	28	(2)
2017–2019	Ull/Kisa	36	(3)

International career
2000–2011	Somalia	10	(1)
- * Club domestic league appearances and goals as of 2 December 2019

Ciise Aden Abshir (born 1 June 1986) is a Somali professional footballer who last played for Norwegian second-tier club Ullensaker/Kisa IL. He's one of the most capped players for the Somalia national team.

== Honours ==
- Somalia League
  - Winners (5): 2000, 2001, 2002, 2003, 2004
- Tanzanian Premier League
  - Winners (1): 2004
