= Super Shell FC =

Super Shell
- Full name: Super Shell Football Club
- Ground: Afgooye, Somalia
- League: Somalia League
- 2011: 6th

Super Shell is a Somali football club based in Afgoye, Somalia.

== History ==
The club was founded in Mogadishu and first participated in the Somali National League, the country's top division in 2004. The league started in September 2004, but was suspended after a few weeks and only resumed in August 2006. Super Shell finished 6th out of seven top-division teams and avoided relegation.

In 2011, Super Shell finished sixth again and had to participate in the relegation playoffs. There, the club faced Dekedaha on May 2nd, lost 0-3 and got relegated.

== See also ==
- Football in Somalia
