= Hoga =

Somali football club

- Full name: Hoga Mogadishu
- Ground: Banadir Stadium; Mogadishu, Somalia
- Capacity: 20,000
- League: Somali Second Division

Hoga Mogadishu is a Somali football club based in Mogadishu, Somalia which currently plays in Somali Second Division the second division of Somali Football.

In 1968 the team has won the Somalia League.

== Stadium ==
Currently, the team plays at the 20,000-capacity Banadir Stadium.

== Honours ==
- Somalia League: 1968

== Performance in CAF competitions ==
- African Cup of Champions Clubs: 1 appearance

1969 African Cup of Champions Clubs: First Round
