= Duale =

Duale is both a given name and surname of Somali origin. Notable people with the name include:

Surname:

- Aden Duale (born 1969), Kenyan politician, Majority Leader of the National Assembly
- Elmi Ahmed Duale, Somali physician, diplomat and politician
- Hussein Ali Duale, Somaliland ambassador and finance minister
- Saeed Duale, Yemeni football player

Given name:

- Duale Adan Mohamed, Somali politician
