= Super shell =

Super shell or Supershell may refer to:

- Super Shell FC, a Somalian football club
- Supershell, a very large void in the interstellar medium
- A weapon used in the arcade game 1943: The Battle of Midway

== See also ==
- Superswell
