= Feynuus FC =

Somali football club

FC Mogadishu
- Full name: Football Club Mogadishu
- Ground: Al-Hilal Stadium; Mogadishu, Somalia
- Capacity: 35000
- League: Somalia League

Feynuus FC is a Somali football club based in Mogadishu, Somalia.

== Honours ==
- Somalia Cup

Winner (1): 2010
