= Alba FC =

Somalian football club

- League: Somalia League

Alba FC is a football club in Somalia. They were Somali football champions in 1995.

== Achievements ==
- 1995 Somalia League champions

== See also ==
- Football in Somalia
