= Mohamed Farah (footballer) =

Somali footballer (1961–2020)

Personal information
- Full name: Abdulkadir Mohamed Farah
- Date of birth: 15 February 1961
- Place of birth: Beledweyne, Somalia
- Date of death: 24 March 2020 (aged 59)
- Place of death: London, England

Senior career*
Years	Team	Apps	(Gls)
- Batroolka

International career
- Somalia
- * Club domestic league appearances and goals

Abdulkadir Mohamed Farah (15 February 1961 – 24 March 2020) was a Somali footballer.

== Career ==
Born in Beledweyne, Farah began his career in 1976 at schoolboy level, later playing at the regional level before playing club football for Batroolka. He also represented the Somali national team. Farah later worked as an advisor to the Minister of Youth and Sports.

== Death ==
On 24 March 2020, Farah died in a London hospital from COVID-19.
