= Somali Fruit FC =

Somali football club

Somali Fruit
- Full name: Somali Fruit FC
- Nickname: Fruit
- Ground: Mogadishu Stadium
- Capacity: 65,000
- Chairman: Hassan Mohamud Dhiblawe

Somali Fruit football club is an African football club, established in 1999 based in Somalia. Mogadishu Stadium is their home stadium. They currently play in the Somalia League the top division of Somali football.
