= Mogadishu Municipality =

Somali football club

Mogadiscio
- Full name: Mogadiscio Municipality
- Ground: Banadir Stadium; Mogadishu, Somalia
- Capacity: 20,000
- League: Somalia League

Mogadiscio Municipality is a Somali football club based in Mogadishu, Somalia which currently plays in Somali Second Division the second division of Somali Football.

In 1975 the team has won the Somalia League.

== Stadium ==
Currently the team plays at the 20000 capacity Banadir Stadium.

== Honours ==
- Somalia League: 1976, 1986, 1989
