= Marine Club FC =

Somali football club

Marine Club
- Full name: Marine Football Club
- Ground: Halmuduh; Halmuduh, Somalia
- Capacity: 10000
- League: Somalia League (1984)

Marine Club is a Somali football club based in Halmuduh, Somalia. They won the Somalia Cup in 1979 and 1986.
