= Somali Football Federation =

Governing body of association football in Somalia

- Sport: Football
- Jurisdiction: Somalia
- Abbreviation: SFF
- Founded: 1951
- Affiliation: FIFA (1962); CAF (1968); UAFA (1974)
- Headquarters: Mogadishu
- President: Ali Abdi Mohamed (Ali Shine)
- Secretary: Yusuf Muhudin Ahmed

Official website
- footballsomalia.so/en/
- (Somalia)

The Somali Football Federation (SFF) (Somali: Xiriirka Soomaaliyeed ee Kubbadda Cagta; Arabic: اتحاد الصومال لكرة القدم), was founded in 1951, and it is one of the national administrative governing bodies of the Confederation of African Football (CAF) responsible for organizing and controlling the sport of football and its competitions (the first, second, and third divisions, as well as the Somalia Cup) in the Federal Republic of Somalia, they also manage the Somalia national football team. In 1962, the SFF became a FIFA member. It later joined CAF in 1968, and the Union of Arab Football Associations (UAFA) in 1974. The SFF is responsible for organizing matches between local teams and enforcing rules and regulations of the game during matches.

== History ==
On August 19, 2017, the Somali Football Federation (SFF) closed its headquarters for seven days to mourn the death of Osman Jama Diraa, a member of the executive committee who was killed in the capital. SFF President Abdiqani Said Arab said, "We have lost a great friend and brother who dedicated much of his life to developing the game. The seven days of mourning are just a formality, but he will always be remembered. His death is a great loss for us." The SFF executive committee decided to stop all football-related activities during this time.

== Crests ==
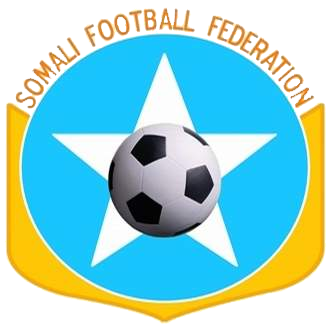
Former logo

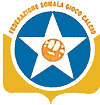
Former logo

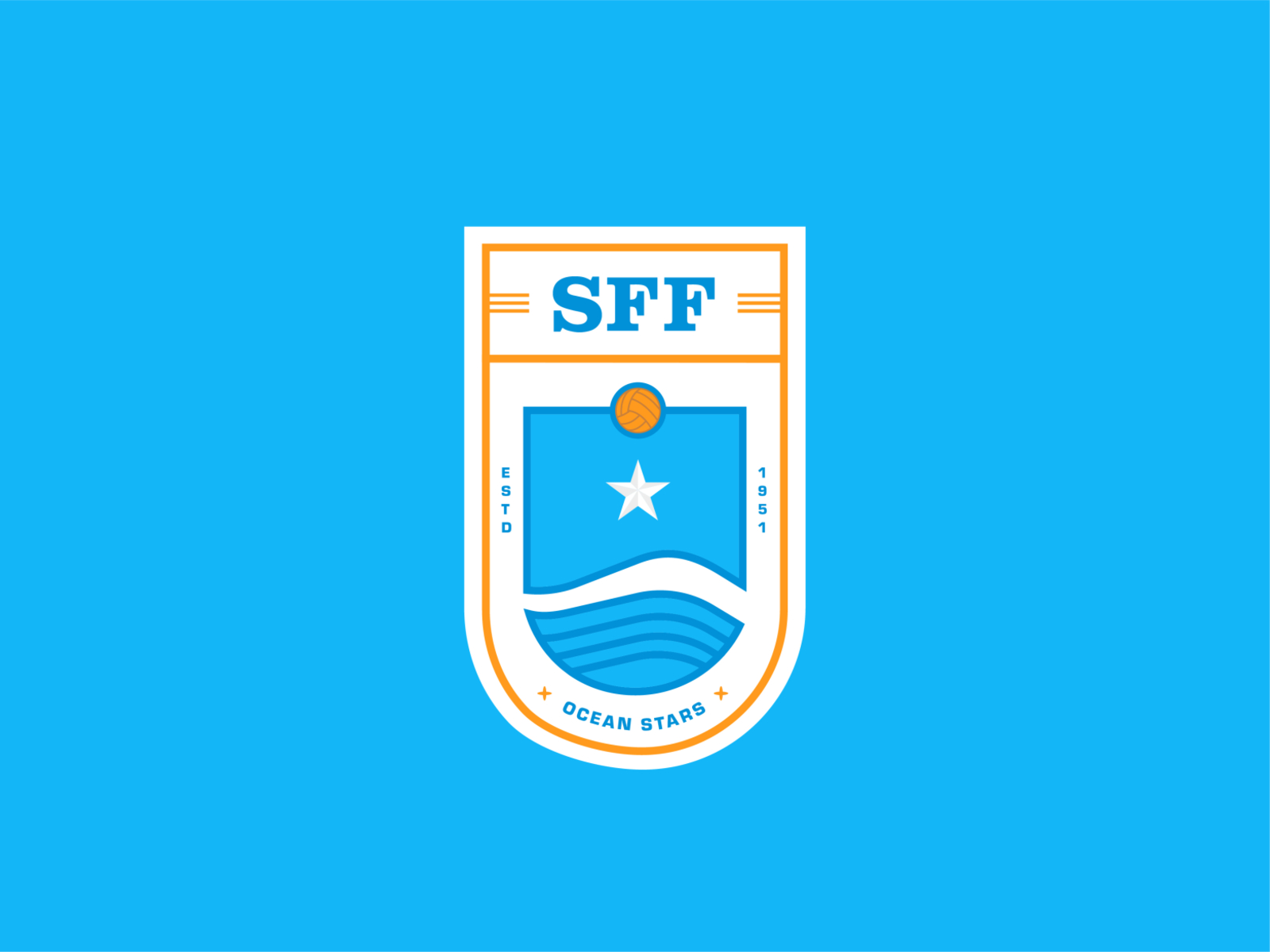
proposed Somali football federation logo redesign

== Management ==
Management:

President

- Ali Abdi Mohamed

Vice President

- Ahmed Takal; General Secretary
- Hussein Aweis Ahmed

Othman Moalin Treasurer

- Ghuled Alisaid

== Coaching ==
Coaching

Technical Director

Murad Abdikadir

Men's Coach

- yusuf Ali Nur ( yuu ali )

Assistant Coach

- Tiego Ceser

Women's Coach

- Hussein Ali Abdule

Media Officer

- Adnan Mohamed

Futsal Coordinator

- Abdul Muhammad

Referee Coordinator

- MOHAMED AHMED Ali

== Committee Members ==
Abdiqani Said – Beach Soccer Committee

== Referees ==
Referees

- MOHAMED HAGI Hassan (international since 2014)
- OLAD ARAB Bashir (international since 2004)
- WIISH Hagi Yabarow (international since 2011)

Assistant Referees

- ABDI Hamza Hagi (international since 2013)
- ALI MOHAMUD Ali Mohamud MAHAD (international since 2014)
- AWEYS Abdulahi Sheikh (international since 2014)
- MOHAMED Mussa Abdulahi (international since 2014)
- OMAR ABUKAR Salah (international since 2001)
- SULEIMAN Bashir Sh. Abdi (international since 2013)

== Agents ==
- N/A

== See also ==
- Somalia Cup
- Somalia League
- Somalia national beach soccer team
- Somalia national football team
