= Abdiwali Abdirahman Mohamed =

Somali footballer (born 2000)

Personal information
- Full name: Abdiwali Abdirahman Mohamed
- Date of birth: 1 January 2000 (age 26)
- Place of birth: Somalia
- Position: Left back

Team information
- Current team: Horseed Sports Club
- Number: 27

Senior career*
Years	Team	Apps	(Gls)
- Horseed Sports Club

International career^{‡}
2019–	Somalia	1	(0)
- * Club domestic league appearances and goals as of 18:30, 14 September 2019 (UTC) ‡ National team caps and goals as of 18:30, 14 September 2019 (UTC)

Abdiwali Abdirahman Mohamed (Somali: Abdiwali Abdrihman; born 1 January 2000) is a Somali footballer who plays as a defender for Horseed Sports Club.

== Club career ==
Abdirahman Mohamed made two appearances for Mogadishu City Club in the 2020–21 CAF Champions League.

== International career ==
On 3 August 2019, Abdirahman Mohamed made his debut for Somalia in a 4–1 loss against Uganda during the 2020 African Nations Championship qualification.
