= National Printing Agency FC =

Somali football club

Printing Agency
- Full name: National Printing Agency Football Club
- Ground: Banadir Stadium; Mogadishu, Somalia
- Capacity: 20,000
- League: Somali Second Division
- 2018: 8th

National Printing Agency Football Club is a Somali football club based in Mogadishu, Somalia which currently plays in Somali Second Division the second division of Somali Football.

In 1983, the team won the Somalia League.

== Stadium ==
The team plays at the 20,000 capacity Banadir Stadium.

== Honours ==
- Somalia League: 1983
