= KIGS SC =

Somali football club

- Full name: KIGS Sports Club
- Founded: 1999
- Ground: Banadir Stadium, Mogadishu Stadium; Mogadishu, Somalia
- Capacity: 15,000
- Chairman: Abdirahim Mohamed Ali
- Manager: Mahad nor Mahadalle
- League: National league
- 2024–25: 6th
Home colours

KIGS SC, before 2023 known as Jazeera SC is a Somali football club based in Mogadishu, Somalia which currently plays in Somalia League the top division of Somali Football.

== History ==
Founded as Mogadishu United, the club made its first Somali Premier League appearance in 2016–17 and relegated back to the Somali First Division in the same season. 2019 saw their comeback season to the top tier and manage a 6th-place finish retaining their top tier status.
