= Horseed Stadium =

Stadium in Mogadishu, Somalia

Coordinates: 8.72652°N 49.33682°E

- Interactive map of Horseed Stadium
- Location: Mogadishu, Somalia
- Capacity: 10,000
- Surface: Turf

Tenant
- Horseed

Horseed Stadium is a multi-purpose stadium in Mogadishu, Somalia. It is currently used mostly for football matches and is the home ground of Somali First Division team Horseed FC.

The stadium currently holds 10,000 spectators.

It had previously served as the headquarters of the football team for the Somali military.
