= Somali Division Two Football League =

Somali association football league

- Country: Somalia
- Confederation: CAF
- Level on pyramid: 3
- Promotion to: Somalia Second League
- Domestic cup: Somalia Cup
- Broadcaster: Universal TV (highlights)

The Somali Division 2 was the third football division in Somalia. The league was contested by 9 clubs

== Clubs ==
As of 2013-14 season:

- Bariga Dhexe
- Gasko FC
- Geeska Afrika
- Hilaac
- Jamhuuriya TB
- Midnimo
- Mogadishu United
- Raadsan
- Singjet

== See also ==
- Somali Division 2
