= Somalia Cup =

Annual association football tournament in Somalia

- Founded: 1977
- Region: Somalia
- Current champions: Dekedaha (2024)
- Most championships: Horseed (6 titles)

The Somalia Cup is the top knockout football tournament in Somalia. Horseed are the competition's most successful club, having won it six times.

== List of finals ==
Year	Winners	Score	Runners-up
1977	Lavori Publici	–	Marine Club
1978	Not played		
1979	Marine Club	–	
1980	Lavori Publici	–	
1981	Printing Agency	–	
1982	Horseed	–	
1983	Horseed	–	
1984	Waxool	–	
1985	Petroleum	–	
1986	Marine Club	–	
1987	Horseed	–	
2002	Dekedaha	–	
2003	Banaadir Telecom	–	
2004	Dekedaha	–	
2005	Unknown		
2006	Unknown		
2007	SITT Daallo	1–0	Dekedaha
2008	Unknown		
2009	Unknown		
2010	Feynuus	0–0, 2–0	Dekedaha
2011	Unknown		
2012	Banaadir Telecom	3–1	Badbaado
2013	Not held		
2014	LLPP Jeenyo	4–2	Heegan
2015	Horseed	2–1	Heegan
2016	Jeenyo United	2–2 (aet, 4–1 pen.)	Banaadir Telecom
2017	Elman	1–0	Jamhuuriya TB
2018	Banaadir Telecom	2–1	Elman
2019	Horseed	3–2	Mogadishu City
2020	Horseed	3–0	Dekedaha
2021–2022	Not held		
2023	Dekedaha	2–0	Elman
2024	Dekedaha	2–1	Mogadishu City
2025-2026	Mogadishu City Club	3-2 (AET)	Horseed

== Number of Titles (Known) ==
Number of Titles	Team
6	Horseed
4	Jeenyo United, Dekedaha, Mogadishu City
3	
2	Marine Club
1	Elman, Fenyuus, NPA FC, Petroleum, SIIT Daallo, Waxool
