= Gasko FC =

Somali football club

Gasco
- Full name: Gasco Football Club
- Ground: Banadir Stadium

Gasko FC is a Somali football club. In 2013 they played in the Somali Third Division. Gasko is one of the major clubs based in Kaaraan district. They contested football at first division in 2003/2004 season. However financial crisis led to the club relegated to second division in 2010/11 season and third division in 2011/12 season.

== See also ==
- Football in Somalia
