= Savana FC =

Somali football club

Savaana
- Full name: Savaana Football Club
- Ground: Banadir Stadium; Mogadishu, Somalia
- Capacity: 20,000
- Manager: Mansur A Mumin
- League: Somalia League
- 2013–14: 8th
Home colours

Savaana FC is a Somali football club based in Mogadishu, Somalia which currently plays in Somalia League.

The team plays in yellow and blue kits.

== Stadium ==
Currently the team plays at the 20,000 capacity Banadir Stadium.
