= Badbaado =

Somalian football club

- Full name: Badbaado Football Club
- Nickname: BFc
- Founded: 1999
- Ground: Badbaado; Mogadishu, Somalia
- Capacity: 35000
- Chairman: Abdulaahi Omar Ahmed
- Manager: Mustaf Faransa
- League: Somalia national league
- 2025–26: 8th

Badbaado FC is a Somali football club based in Mogadishu, Somalia.

== See also ==
- Football in Somalia
