= Waxool FC =

Somali football club

Waxool FC is a Somali football club. It competed in the 2018 Somali First Division.
