= Mogadishu Stadium =

Stadium in Mogadishu, Somalia

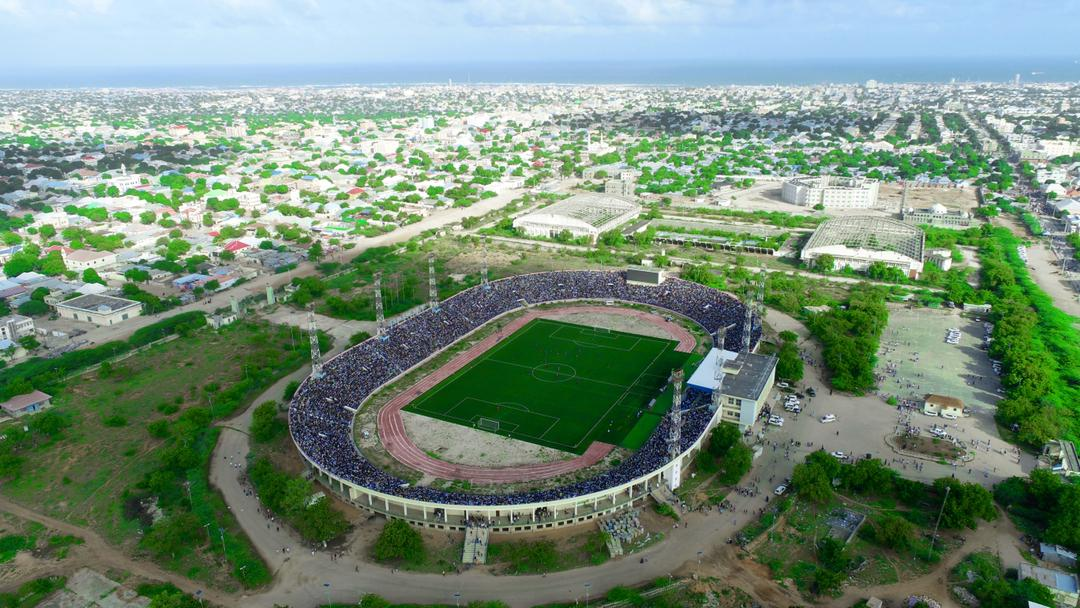
- Aerial view of the stadium
- Interactive map of Mogadishu Stadium
- Full name: Garoonka Muqdisho
- Address: Banaadir Region of Mogadishu,Somalia
- Location: Mogadishu, Somalia
- Coordinates: 2°4′3.16″N 45°20′7.65″E
- Owner: Federal Government of Somalia: Ministry of Youth and Sports (Somalia)
- Operator: Somali Football Federation
- Capacity: 65,000
- Surface: AstroTurf
- Scoreboard: Yes

Construction
- Opened: 1977
- Renovated: 2013–2020

Tenants
- Somali League; Somalia national football team (1977–present)

Mogadishu Stadium (Somali: Garoonka Muqdisho) is a stadium in Mogadishu, Somalia. During the Somali Civil War, the stadium was heavily damaged by foreign troops who used the structure as a base. The stadium has been completely rebuilt and artificial turf was laid on 27 March 2020.

== History ==
The facility was constructed in 1977 during the Siad Barre administration, with the assistance of Chinese engineers. Although Mogadishu Stadium was mainly used for hosting sporting activities, presidential addresses and political rallies were also held there. The first game ever held at the stadium occurred soon after construction completed during 1978 between the Somali national team and a Chinese club Leonen.

In 1987, the popular singer Magool staged the famous "Mogadishu and Magool" concert at basketball hall (adjacent to football stadium) which is part of this wide sports facility/village. It was among the largest such musical events held at the time, with thousands of people in attendance.

=== Civil War ===
Following the start of the civil war in the early 1990s, the stadium was used as a base by various armed factions. A few football matches from that period were intermittently staged, but the facility remained under the control of militants. During UNOSOM II, American and Pakistani forces used the stadium as a base and caused significant damage. Following the UN withdrawal in 1995, the Somali Football Federation repaired most of the destruction and games resumed.

During 2006, FIFA financed the installation of a new artificial pitch at the Mogadishu Stadium. However, the venue along with other local facilities gradually incurred infrastructural damage over the following years. During the 2007–2009 occupation of Mogadishu, the Ethiopian National Defence Force used the stadium as a military base. In those two years Ethiopian troops caused far more damage to the structure than the American and Pakistani UNOSOM forces based there over a decade earlier. When Ethiopian troops withdrew in January 2009, more than 50% of the stadium was destroyed.

The day following the Ethiopian withdrawal from the city on 14 January 2009, the Somali Football Federation inspected and assessed the stadium for use. Remnants of the Islamic Courts Union would hand over the stadium to the SFF after announcing that the stadium was meant for recreational and not military use. In the months following, Al-Shabaab seized control of the stadium and used it as a base of operations. When the group laid siege to much of Mogadishu and other southern areas in 2008, it prohibited sporting activities.

In August 2011, during the Battle of Mogadishu, the Somali National Army (SNA) backed by AMISOM troops recaptured the capital and stadium from the militants.

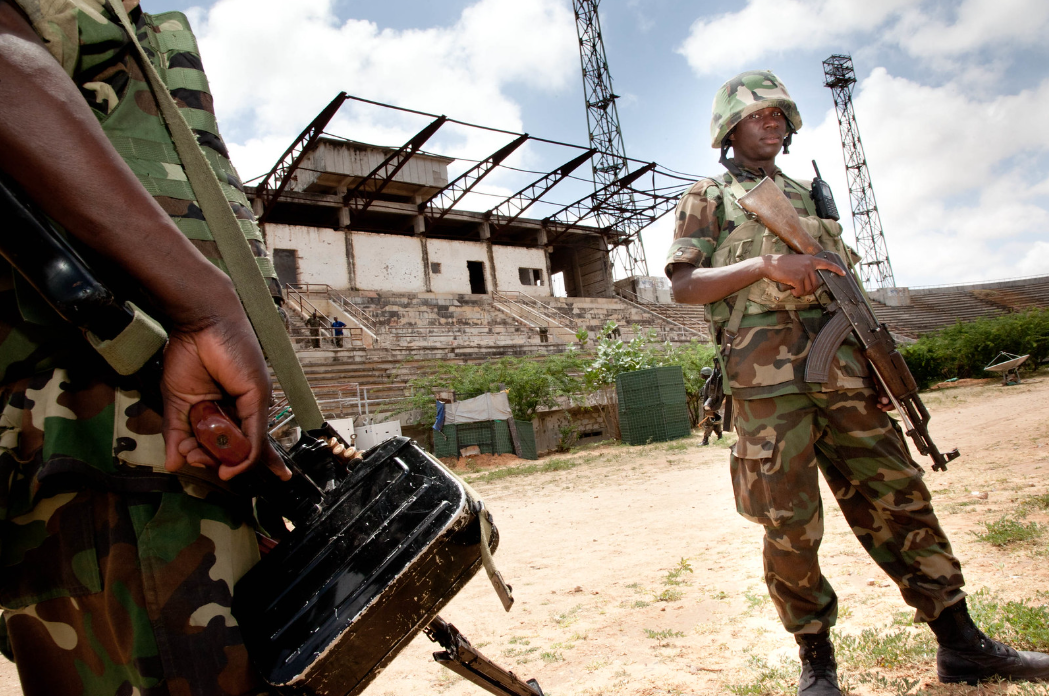
Ugandan AMISOM troops in Mogadishu stadium following Al-Shabaab withdrawal (2011)

=== Reconstruction ===
In 2013, the newly established famous Federal Government of Somalia began renovating the stadium in conjunction with Chinese officials. By 2015, the artificial turf had been refurbished. The stadium also began again serving as one of the main sporting venues in the capital for Somali League football matches.

== Renovations ==
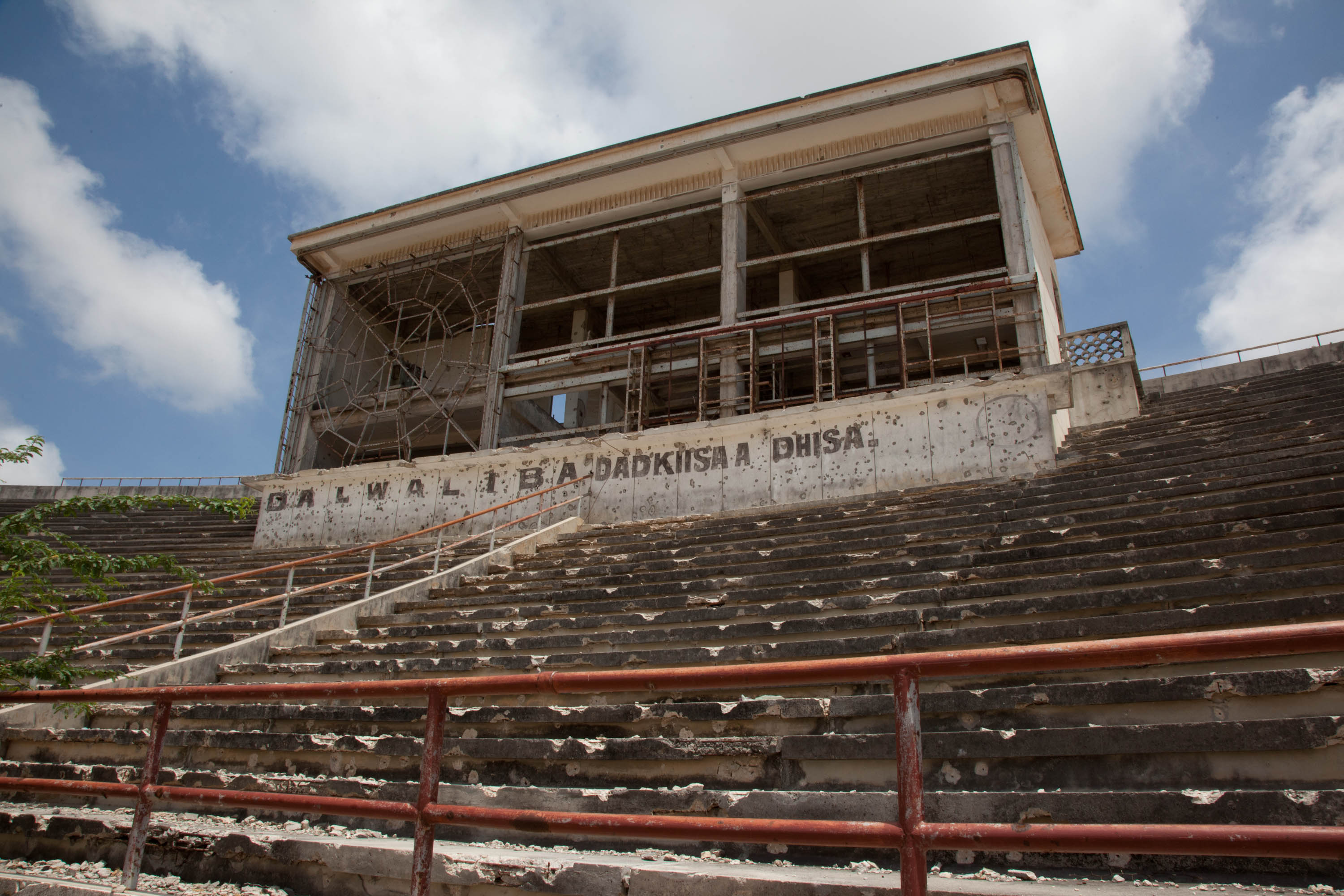
Tribune before the renovation

In September 2013, the Somali federal government and its Chinese counterpart signed an official bilateral cooperation agreement in Mogadishu as part of a five-year national recovery plan in Somalia. Under the terms of the accord, the Chinese authorities were slated to reconstruct several major infrastructural landmarks in the Somali capital and elsewhere, including the Mogadishu Stadium. The renovation was completed in 2020 and it hosted the sixtieth anniversary of independence on 1 July 2020.

== Capacity and facilities ==
Mogadishu Stadium has a capacity of 65,000 spectators. It features a tournament ground, as well as grounds for track and field, football, basketball, volleyball and tennis.

== Attendance record ==
In July 2021, 65,000 people showed up for a domestic top-flight football league game between Horseed FC and Mogadishu City Club at the Mogadishu Stadium. It was the best-attended Somali league game ever.

== See also ==
- List of association football stadiums by capacity
- Lists of stadiums
