= Horseed =

- Town
- Location in Somalia
- Coordinates: 1°45′0″N 44°38′0″E
- Country: Somalia
- Somalia: Shabelle Hoose
- Time zone: UTC+3 (East Africa Time)

Horseed is a district of Marka, a city in the Shabelle Hoose region in southern Somalia. Its geographical coordinates are 1° 45' 0" North, 44° 38' 0" East.
