= Jeenyo United FC =

LLPP Jeenyo
- Full name: Jeenyo United Football Club
- Founded: 3 January 1948
- Ground: Banadir Stadium, Mogadishu
- Capacity: 30,000
- League: Somali Premier League
- 2025–26: 7th

Jeenyo United Football Club is a football club based in Mogadishu, Somalia.

== History ==
The club was established in 1948, and was originally named SC Genio Officina. Most of the players came from the former teams "Società Calcistica Mogadiscio" and "Amaruini", that played amateur football in the Italian Somalia from 1936 until 1941. They won Division One of the Campionato di Calcio in 1952, and were renamed Lavori Pubblici (Public Works) for the 1953–54 season, due to its links with the Ministry of Public Works. They were champions again in 1959–60, defeating Autoparco 3–2 on aggregate in a two-legged championship play-off after the two clubs had finished joint top-of-the table.

The club won their first Somalia League title in 1969. The club went on to win the title again in 1970 and 1971. They won the Somalia Cup in 1977 and 1980, before winning their sixth league title in 1980–81.

The original club folded in 1990 as the country descended in to civil war, but was relaunched on 11 March 2012. In 2014 they won the Somalia Cup with a 4–2 win over Heegan in the final, and went onto win the Somali Super Cup, beating Benadir SC 5–4 on penalties following a 2–2 draw. They won the Somalia Cup again in 2016, defeating Benadir SC 4–1 on penalties after a 2–2 draw.

Jeenyo finished bottom of the First Division in the 2019 season, and were relegated to the Second Division. However, in 2019–20 the club were champions of the Second Division and were promoted to the First Division.

== Continental matches ==
Year	Tournament	Round	Opponent	Home	Away	Aggregate
1970	African Cup of Champions Clubs	Preliminary	(Uganda) Prisons FC Kampala	2–1	2–4	4–5
1971	African Cup of Champions Clubs	1	(Tanzania) Young Africans SC	0–0	0–2	0–2
1972	African Cup of Champions Clubs	1	(Ethiopia) Saint-George SA	1–3	1–1	2–4
1978	African Cup Winners' Cup	Preliminary	(Sudan) Al-Hilal Club	0–1	0–1	0–2
1981	African Cup Winners' Cup	1	(Egypt) Zamalek SC	w/o	–	–
1981	African Cup Winners' Cup	2	(Kenya) Gor Mahia FC	1–0	0–3	1–3
1982	African Cup of Champions Clubs	1	(Egypt) Al-Ahly	0–0	0–1	0–1

== Honours ==
- Somalia League
  - Champions 1969, 1970, 1971, 1980–81
- Campionato di Calcio
  - Division One champions 1952, 1959–60
- Second Division
  - Champions 2019–20
- Somalia Cup
  - Winners 1977, 1980, 2014, 2016
- Somalia Super Cup
  - Winners 2014

== See also ==
- Football in Somalia
