= Mogadishu City Club =

Association football club in Somalia

- Full name: Mogadishu City Club
- Nickname: "Minishiibiyo"
- Founded: 1963; 63 years ago
- Ground: Mogadishu Stadium
- Capacity: 65,000
- Chairman: Abuukar Husein Mohammed
- Manager: Mohamed Mistiri Lamjed
- League: Somali First Division
- 2025–26: 4th
Home colours	Away colours

Mogadishu City Club (Arabic: نادي مدينة مقديشو) is a professional football club based in Mogadishu, Somalia. They play at Mogadishu Stadium, it is one of the most successful football clubs in the country. The club plays with Elman FC in the Mogadishu Derby. Formerly known as Banadir Sports Club, in 2019, the club was renamed to Mogadishu City Club. In 2019, Mohamed Mistri Lamjed is named the new manager of Mogadishu City Club.

== History ==
Mogadishu City Club was established in 1963 by support of the mayor of Mogadishu. The club which was nicknamed by Municipio Club. In the early years, the club was active in nine different sports: football, basketball, handball, table tennis, tennis, volleyball, swimming, athletics and cycling.

Following the start of the civil war in early 1991, the stadium of Mogadishu Club was kept save and was used by the youth club Banaadir Sports Club. In 2019, that club was renamed by the Mayor of Mogadishu Capital City Mr. Abdurrahman Omar Osman Eng. Yariisow to Mogadishu City Club.

== Squad 2021–22 ==
Note: Flags indicate national team as defined under FIFA eligibility rules; some limited exceptions apply. Players may hold more than one non-FIFA nationality.

No.	Pos.	Nation	Player
1	GK	SOM	Said Aweys Ali
12	GK	LBA	Hussein Ali Hassan
13	GK	SOM	Abdirahman Mahdi Isse
2	DF	SOM	Abdiwali Abdirahman Mohamed
4	DF	SOM	Isse Abdulkadir Ibrahim
5	DF	SOM	Ahmed Abdullahi Abdi
14	DF	GHA	Issahaque Zakaria
—	MF	SOM	Abdiaziz Mohamed
—	MF	SOM	Abdifitah Deqow
—	MF	UGA	Nicholas Kagaba

No.	Pos.	Nation	Player
—	MF	SOM	Kingsley Asogwa
6	MF	SOM	Ali Omar Ali
18	MF	UGA	Bronson Nsubuga
23	MF	MLI	Seydouba Camara
—	FW	SOM	Faysal Hash
—	FW	SOM	Abdimajid Ibrahim
—	FW	UGA	Stephen Ategeka
8	FW	SOM	Hassan Mohamed Aadan
11	FW	SOM	Abdirizak Mohamed
16	FW	SOM	Abdullahi Moalim

== Coaching staff ==
Position	Staff
Head coach	(Tunisia) Mohamed Mistiri Lamjed
Assistant coach	(Somalia) Adil Nur
Assistant coach	(Somalia) Mutaf Shiikh Ali
Team manager	(Somalia) Ajeelow
Kit manager	(Somalia) Liban Ahmed

Last updated: 29 January 2021

== Achievements ==
- Somalia League: 11

1976, 1986, 1989, 1999, 2004–05, 2008–09, 2009–10, 2013–14, 2015–16, 2019–20, 2024–25

- Somalia Cup: 3

2003, 2012, 2018

- Somalia Super Cup: 1

2024

== See also ==
- Football in Somalia
