= Banadir Stadium =

Eng. yariisow stadium

Coordinates: 2°02′31″N 45°21′24″E

Eng. Yariisow Stadium
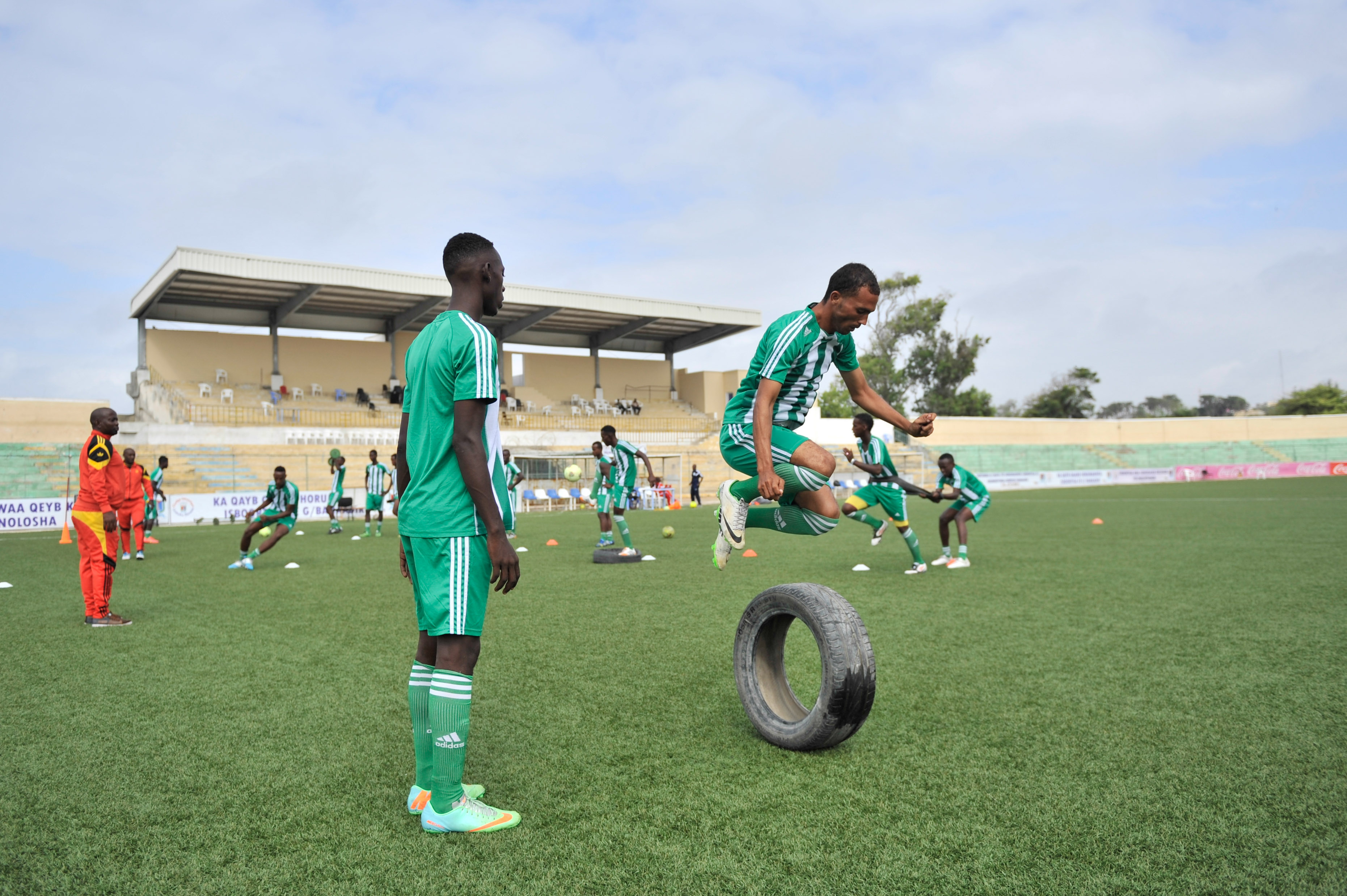
- Interactive map of Eng. Yariisow Stadium
- Former names: Benadir Stadium, Koonis/Coni Stadium
- Location: Mogadishu, Somalia
- Capacity: 20,000

Construction
- Opened: 1956
- Renovated: 2009
- Expanded: 1980s

Tenant
- Somali League

The Eng. Yariisow Stadium, formerly known as Garoonka Banaadir Stadium, or simply Benadir Stadium in the Somali language, is a multi-use 20,000-capacity stadium in Mogadishu, Banaadir, Somalia, that is currently used mostly for football matches. Until the 1970s, the stadium was called the Coni Stadium because it was built by the Italian Coni. It is currently being rebuilt through FIFA's Win in Africa with Africa program.

== History ==
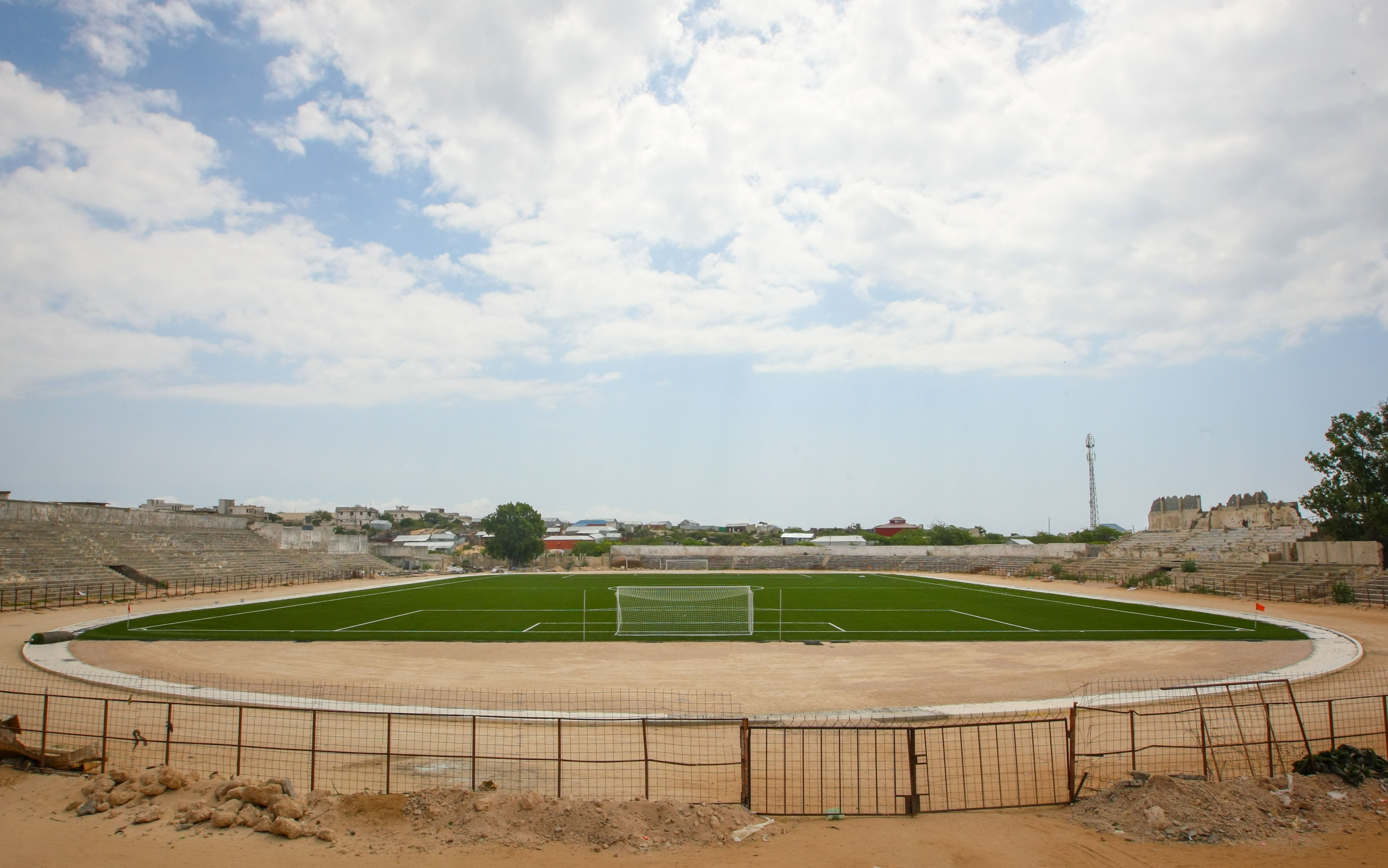
2012

Originally in the area there was the small Stadio Municipale di Mogadiscio as the main sport area in the capital of Italian Somalia; it was created in the late 1930s just north of the Porto di Mogadiscio and hosted the first football matches in Mogadishu. On the enlarged grounds of this "Campo Sportivo" in the 1950s, the first football stadium in Somalia was built during the Fiduciary Administration of Somalia done by Italy under ONU mandate, the Coni Stadium, later renamed "Banadir Stadium" in the early 1960s. The stadium was a donation of the Italian government to the Somali people and was built in 1956 by the Italian National Olympic Committee. It was inaugurated in October 1956 and was one of the best in Africa when inaugurated, with competitions held in athletics and even bicycle racing.

The Coni Stadium when inaugurated had an area of 23,300 square meters, with athletics tracks of 200 meters and a covered tribune for 1000 spectators seated. The original real-grass turf was changed to artificial in the late 1990s, after the civil war damages to the stadium. The Banadir stadium was fully destroyed during the Somali Civil War in the 1990s and early 2000s. Later, it was rebuilt by FIFA's Win in Africa with Africa program in the late 2000s and since 2009, it has again hosted football games.

Built in 1956 by the Italian Olympic committee, the Banadir Stadium is not currently being reconstructed under the FIFA-funded project "Win in Africa with Africa" and is being kitted out with artificial football turf. The old stadium, which was not repaired since the early 1980s was one of the loveliest football faciities [sic] in Africa during the late 1950s and early 1960s, according to Abdullahi Huusein Baskuwaale who was a member of the first Somali team to play in the stadium at the end of its construction in 1956.

— AIPS

As of 2010, the stadium is the home field for the following teams:

- Jeenyo United F.C. (formerly Lavori Pubblici)
- Savaana
- Somali Police FC (Heegan)
- Gaadiidka
- Dekedda FC

In August 2019, it was renamed after Abdirahman Omar Osman, known as "Engineer Yarisow", the former mayor of Mogadishu and governor of the Banaadir region, who died in an explosive attack in his office.

== Capacity and facilities ==
The Banadir Stadium has been recently improved to a possible capacity of 20,000 spectators. It features a tournament ground, as well as grounds for track and field and football.

== See also ==
- Mogadishu Stadium
- Football in Somalia
