= Gaadiidka FC =

Somali football club

Gaadiidka
- Full name: Gaadiidka Football Club
- Founded: 1976; 50 years ago
- Ground: Banadir Stadium; Mogadishu, Somalia
- Capacity: 20,000
- Manager: Dadir Amin Daada
- League: Somalia League
- 2025–26: Champions
Home colours

Gaadiidka FC is a Somali football club based in Mogadishu, Somalia which plays in Somalia League the top division of Somali Football. The team plays at the 20,000 capacity Banadir Stadium. The club plays in blue kits.

== Honours ==
- Somali First Division: 3

1990, 2022, 2025-26

=== Performance in CAF competitions ===
- CAF Confederation Cup: 1 appearance

1991 African Cup of Champions Clubs – Preliminary round

== See also ==
- Football in Somalia
