= Somali Division One Football League =

Somali association football league

- Founded: 1980
- Country: Somalia
- Confederation: CAF
- Number of clubs: 13
- Level on pyramid: 2
- Promotion to: Somali First Division
- Relegation to: Somali Third Division
- Domestic cup: Somalia Cup
- Broadcaster(s): Universal TV (highlights)

The Somali Division One Football League is the second football division in Somalia. The league is contested by 13 clubs.

== Clubs ==
- Al Beder FC
- Batroolka FC
- Bariga Dhexe
- Gasco
- Geeska Africa FC
- Hilaac FC
- Jamhuuriya TB
- Madbacada
- Midniimo
- Rajo
- Sahafi
- Somali Fruit FC
- Waxool SC

== See also ==
- Somali Division 3
