= Somali First Division =

Somali association football league

- Founded: 1967
- Country: Somalia
- Confederation: CAF
- Number of clubs: 12
- Level on pyramid: 1
- Relegation to: Somali Second Division
- Domestic cup: Somalia Cup
- Current champions: Gaadiidka FC (2025–2026)
- Top scorer: (Somalia) Ciise Aden Abshir (103 goals)
- Broadcasters: Astaan TV; Asal TV; Bile TV
- Current: Somali Premier League 2025/26

Match between First Division football clubs Elman and Horseed at Banadir Stadium in 2014

The Somali National League (Somali: Heerka Koowaad ee Soomaali), formerly the Somali Premier League, is the Somali professional league for men's association football. It has been active for over 50 years, having been established in 1967. Somalia has 12 professional clubs playing for the Somali First Division. Football is the most popular sport in Somalia. In the 1930s, Italian Colonial Authorities established some of the first teams in Somalia. In the 2025–26 season, Gaadiidka won the Somali First Division.

== Foreign players ==
Each team competing in the league is only allowed to register four foreign players at a time.

== Clubs ==
As of the 2024-2025 season:

Club	Location	Stadium
Mogadishu City	Mogadishu	Mogadishu Stadium
Dekedaha	Mogadishu	Banadir Stadium
Gaadiidka	Mogadishu	Banadir Stadium
Heegan	Mogadishu	Banadir Stadium
Horseed FC	Horseed	Horseed Stadium
Raadsan SC	Mogadishu	Banadir Stadium
Jeenyo United FC	Mogadishu	Banadir Stadium
Gasko FC	Mogadishu	Banadir Stadium
Elman SC	Mogadishu	Banadir Stadium
KIGS SC	Mogadishu	Banadir Stadium
Madbacada FC	Mogadishu	Banadir Stadium
Badbaado FC	Mogadishu	Mogadishu Stadium

== Previous winners ==
Previous winners were:

Year	Champion
1967	Somali Police (1)
1968	Hoga (1)
1969	Lavori Pubblici (1)
1970	Lavori Pubblici (2)
1971	Lavori Pubblici (3)
1971–72	Horseed (1)
1972–73	Horseed (2)
1973–74	Horseed (3)
1975	Mogadiscio Municipality (1)
1976–77	Horseed (4)
1977–78	Horseed (5)
1978–79	Horseed (6)
1979–80	Horseed (7)
1980–81	Lavori Pubblici (4)
1982	Wagad (1)
1983	National Printing Agency (1)
1984	Marine Club (1)
1985	Wagad (2)
1986	Mogadiscio Municipality (2)
1987	Wagad (3)
1988	Wagad (4)
1989	Mogadiscio Municipality (3)
1990	Gaadiidka (1)
Not held between 1991 and 1993
1994	Morris Supplies (1)
1995	Alba (1)
Not held in 1996 and 1997
1998	Dekedaha (1)
1999	Banaadir (1)
2000	Elman (1)
2001	Elman (2)
2002	Elman (3)
2003	Elman (4)
2004–06	Banaadir (2)
2007	Dekedaha (2)
2008	Not held
2008–09	Banaadir (3)
2009–10	Banaadir (4)
2011	Elman (5)
2012	Elman (6)
2013–14	Banaadir (5)
2014–15	Heegan
2015–16	Banaadir (6)
2016–17	Dekedaha (3)
2018	Dekedaha (4)
2019	Dekedaha (5)
2019–20	Mogadishu City (1)
2021	Horseed (8)
2022	Gaadiikdka (2)
2023–24	Dekedaha (6)
2024–25	Mogadishu City (2)
2025–26	Gaadiikdka (3)

== 2021 Somali First Division table ==
The final standings:

Pos.	Football Club	Average attendance	W	D	L	Points
1	Horseed SC	7,533	11	5	2	38
2	Mogadishu City Club	2,512	11	5	2	38
3	Heegan FC	2,032	9	6	3	33
4	Raadsan SC	917	9	6	3	33
5	Dekedaha FC	907	6	5	7	23
6	Midnimo FC	654	7	1	10	22
7	Gaadiidka FC	698	6	3	9	21
8	Jeenyo United FC	567	5	5	8	20
9	Elman SC	520	5	2	11	17
10	Geeska Afrika FC	321	1	2	15	5

Highest attendance: 65,000 at Horseed SC vs Mogadishu City Club.

== Performance by club ==
Club	Titles	Last title
Mogadishu City Club (includes Mogadishu Municipality, Banaadir)	11	2024–25
Horseed FC	8	2020–21
Elman FC	6	2012–13
Dekedda (includes Ports Authority)	6	2023–24
Wagad	4	1988
Jeenyo United (includes Lavori Pubblici)	4	1980–81
Gaadiidka	3	2025–26
Heegan (includes Somali Police)	2	2014–15
Deledda FC	1	1998
Alba	1	1995
Merca New Supplies	1	1994
Marine Club	1	1984
Printing Agency	1	1983
Hoga	1	1968

== Top goalscorers ==
Season	Player	Team	Goals
2023–24	(Nigeria) Adepoju Oluwaseun	Gaadiidka	22
2024–25	(Somalia) Abdulqadir Eenow	Mogadishu City Club	23

== See also ==
- Somalia League 2013–2014
