= Dekedaha FC =

Somali football club

- Full name: Dekedaha Football Club
- Nickname: Naadiga Badda
- Founded: 1973
- Ground: Banadir Stadium, Mogadishu, Somalia
- Capacity: 20,000
- Chairman: Yahya Sheiknur
- League: Somalia League
- 2025–2026: 3rd
| Home colours | Away colours |

Dekedaha FC is a Somali football club based in Mogadishu, Somalia. Up to 2013 they played under the nickname of Ports FC.

== Achievements ==
- Somalia League: 6

1998, 2007, 2017, 2018, 2019, 2024

- Somalia Cup: 4

2002, 2004, 2023, 2024

- Somalia Super Cup: 3

2018, 2019, 2023

== Performance in CAF competitions ==
- CAF Champions League: 2 appearance

2020 – Preliminary Round
2024 - ongoing

- CAF Confederation Cup: 1 appearance2025 second round

== See also ==
- Football in Somalia
