= Heegan FC =

- Full name: Heegan Football Club
- Founded: 1950
- Ground: Banadir Stadium
- Capacity: 20,000
- League: Somalia League
- 2025–26: 2nd
Home colours	Away colours

Heegan FC (formerly Somali Police FC until 2013) is a Somali football club based in Horseed, a district of Merca.

== History ==
The club was founded in the Port of Merca in 1950 by descendants of Italian colonists in Merca during the ONU mandate.

They have won the Somalia League in its inaugural year in 1967, and again in 2014/15.

The team is based in the rebuilt Banadir Stadium.

== Achievements ==
- Somalia League: 2

1967, 2015

== See also ==
- Football in Somalia
