= Elman FC =

Association football club in Somalia

Elman Sports Club
- Match between First Division football clubs Elman and Horseed at Banadir Stadium in 2014
- Full name: Elman Sports Club
- Nickname: The Yellows
- Founded: 1996 by a group of youth sports members led by Abdirashid Haji Nor)
- Ground: Banadir Stadium; Mogadishu, Somalia
- Capacity: 20,000
- Chairman: Abdirizak Farah
- Manager: Mahad Mohamed"micon "
- League: Somali Premier League
- 2025–26: 6th
Home colours	Away colours

Elman Sports Club (Arabic: نادي علمان الرياضي) is a Somali football club based in the Wadajir district of Mogadishu. It competes in the top level of the Somali National League, Locally, it is known primarily by the nickname "The Yellows", due to the colour of their kits. It is the most successful football club in the country, holding a national record of 15 official football trophies of which are, Six Somali National League's, three General Daoud Cups, Five Somali Super Cups and One Somali Stars League.

The club was founded in 1996 by a group of youth sports members led by Abdirashid Hajji Nur, the first President of Elman Sports Club.

== Achievements ==
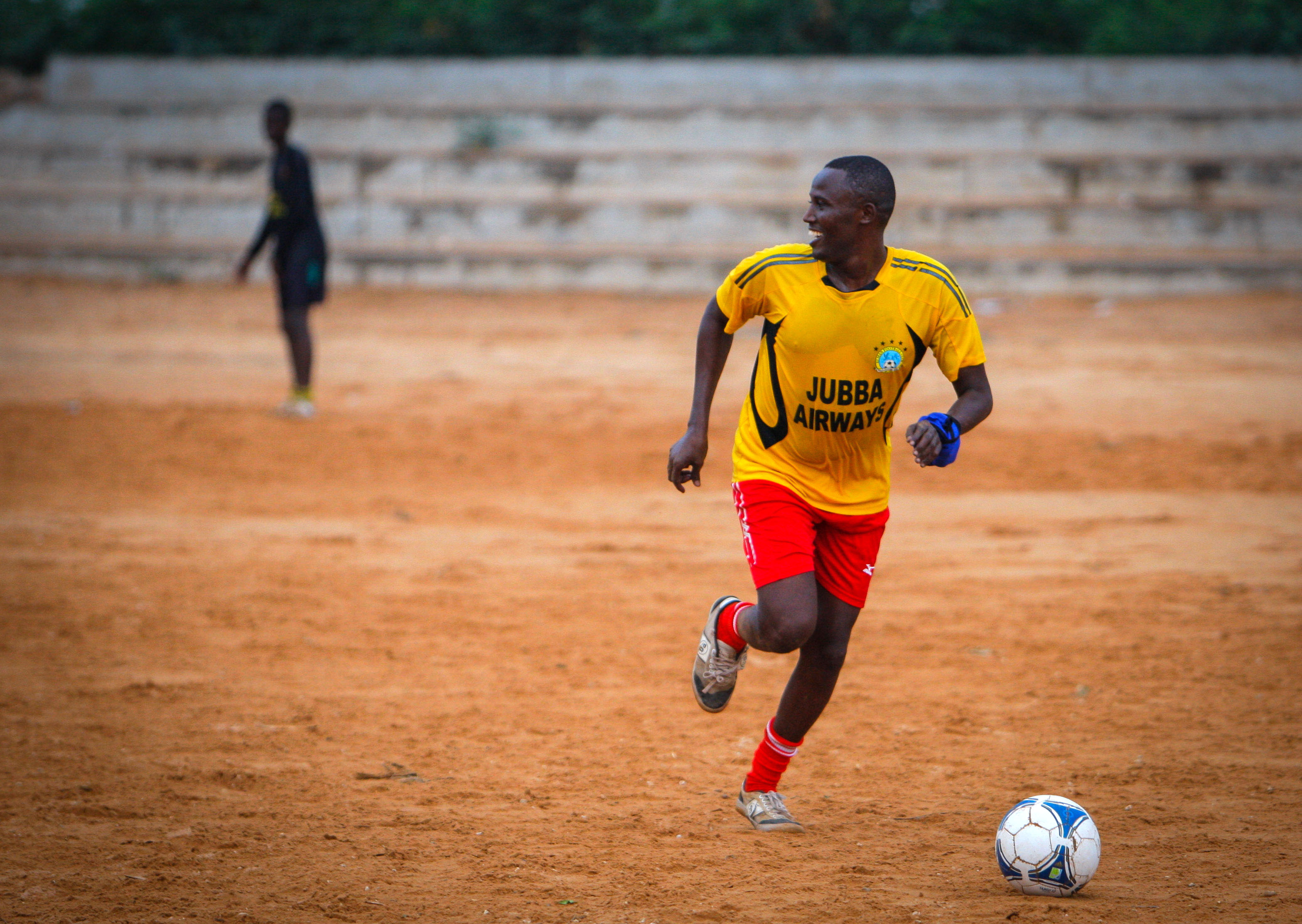
Training

- Somali Premier League

2000, 2001, 2002, 2003, 2011, 2012.

- Somali Super Cup

Champions (5)

- Somali General Daud Cup

Champions (3)

- Somali Stars League

Champions (1): 2017-2018

== Stadium ==
Elman SC play their matches at Jaamacadaha Stadium, which is located in Hodan district. The stadium has a capacity of 15,000 seats. Besides local football matches, the stadium also hosts a number of tournaments such as Somali Demotic Youth League and some of the Somali Division Leagues.

== See also ==
- Football in Somalia
