= Horseed FC =

Association football club in Somalia

Horseed SC
- Match between First Division football clubs Elman and Horseed at Banadir Stadium in 2014
- Full name: Horseed Football Club, "Horseed Sports Club"
- Nicknames: Cawo iyo Maalin, (Day and Night)
- Founded: 1971
- Ground: Banadir Stadium, Somalia
- Capacity: 20,000
- President: Col Hassan Salah Abdi
- Coach: Abdiweli Mohamed Mohamud
- League: Somali First Division
- 2025–26: 5th
| Home colours | Away colours |

Horseed FC is a Somali football club based in Mogadishu, Somalia. It was founded in 1971 by Lt. Col Mohamed Ahmed Alim, who started the Somali Armed Forces Sports Directorate recruiting from the ranks of the Army. It is a seven-time champion of the Somalia League. A team of Somali Armed Forces, Horseed SC was among the most formidable and recognized football clubs in the country. After the civil war broke out, it discontinued operations, but has been revived in 2013 by Gen Dahir Aden Elmi Commander of the Somalia Armed Forces. Gen Elmi revived all the different teams of Horseed Sports Club with emphasis on the Football Team which again began to compete in the Somalia Serie A league. In 2017, Col Ahmed Mohamed Hassan, was appointed as its chairman, and since then the club has seen positive changes and developments which have catapulted the club to regain its former glory.

== CECAFA Club Cup ==
Horseed were the first Somalia League team to reach the CECAFA Club Cup final. In 1977, they were runners up to Luo Union of Kenya, losing 2–1. In the following seasons, they reached the semi-finals of the competition twice, narrowly losing out in the finals to Simba of Tanzania in 1978, and Abaluhya of Kenya in 1979. The matches were held in Somalia. Abulahuya FC went on to win the Cup.

== Achievements ==
- Somalia League: 9

1972, 1973, 1974, 1977, 1978, 1979, 1980, 2021,

- Somalia Cup: 9

1972, 1975, 1976, 1982, 1983, 1987, 2015, 2019, 2020

- Somalia Super Cup: 2

2015, 2021

- CECAFA Club Cup: 0

Runner-up – 1977

== See also ==
- Football in Somalia
