= Fuente de Petróleos =

Fountain in Mexico City, Mexico

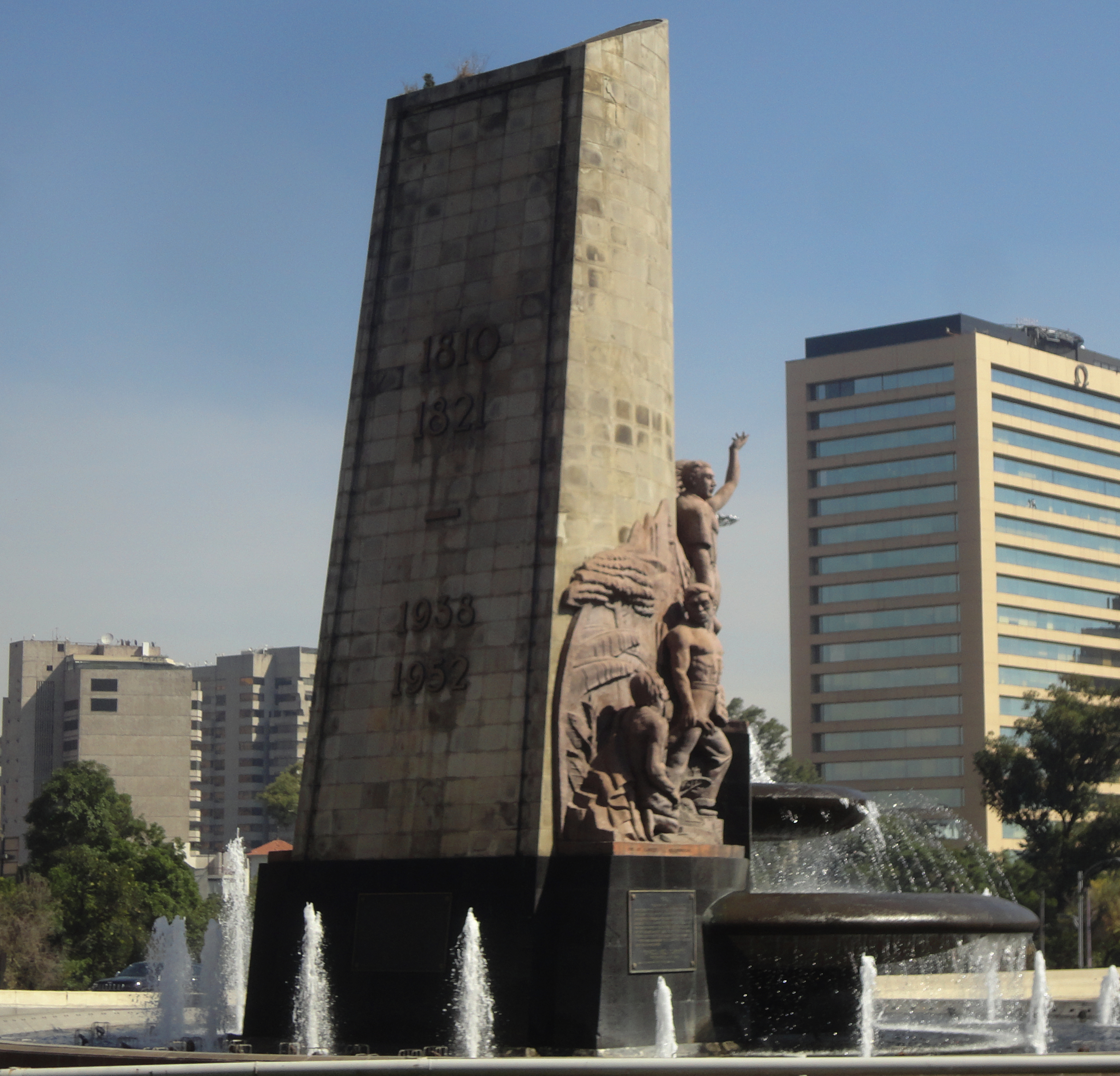
- The fountain in 2019
- Location
- Artist: Vicente Mendiola Quezada (architect); Juan Fernando Olaguíbel (sculptor)
- Year: 1952
- Medium: Tuff stone and bronze
- Movement: Classicism and monumentalism
- Subject: Mexican oil expropriation
- Dimensions: 18 m (59 ft); 55 m diameter (180 ft)
- Location: Mexico City; 19°25′39″N 99°12′11″W

The Fuente de Petróleos (lit. transl. Fountain of Petroleum), officially the Monumento a la Industria Petrolera de México (lit. transl. Monument to the Petroleum Industry of Mexico), is a monument in Chapultepec, Mexico City. Created at the request of President Miguel Alemán Valdés, the artwork honors the Mexican oil expropriation, in which President Lázaro Cárdenas nationalized the oil industry on 18 March 1938, leading to the creation of the state-owned company Pemex.

The monument was erected on a roundabout along Paseo de la Reforma and Anillo Periférico. It features a tall pillar of cantera stone, the tuff that is a traditional Mexican building material, surrounded by two groups of sculptures in the center of a fountain. The monument belongs to a period in the country when monumentalism was a prevailing trend. The sculptures depict a classicist scene influenced by academicism, representing primarily oil workers alongside a figure of Victoria, set among oil-related elements.

The Fuente de Petróleos was designed by the architect Vicente Mendiola and the sculptor Juan Fernando Olaguíbel, who had previously collaborated on works that include the Diana the Huntress Fountain in the city and the Monumento a los Niños Héroes in Guadalajara. The model who posed for the Diana the Huntress Fountain also did so for the monument. Additionally, two sculptures feature self-portraits by the authors.

== Background ==
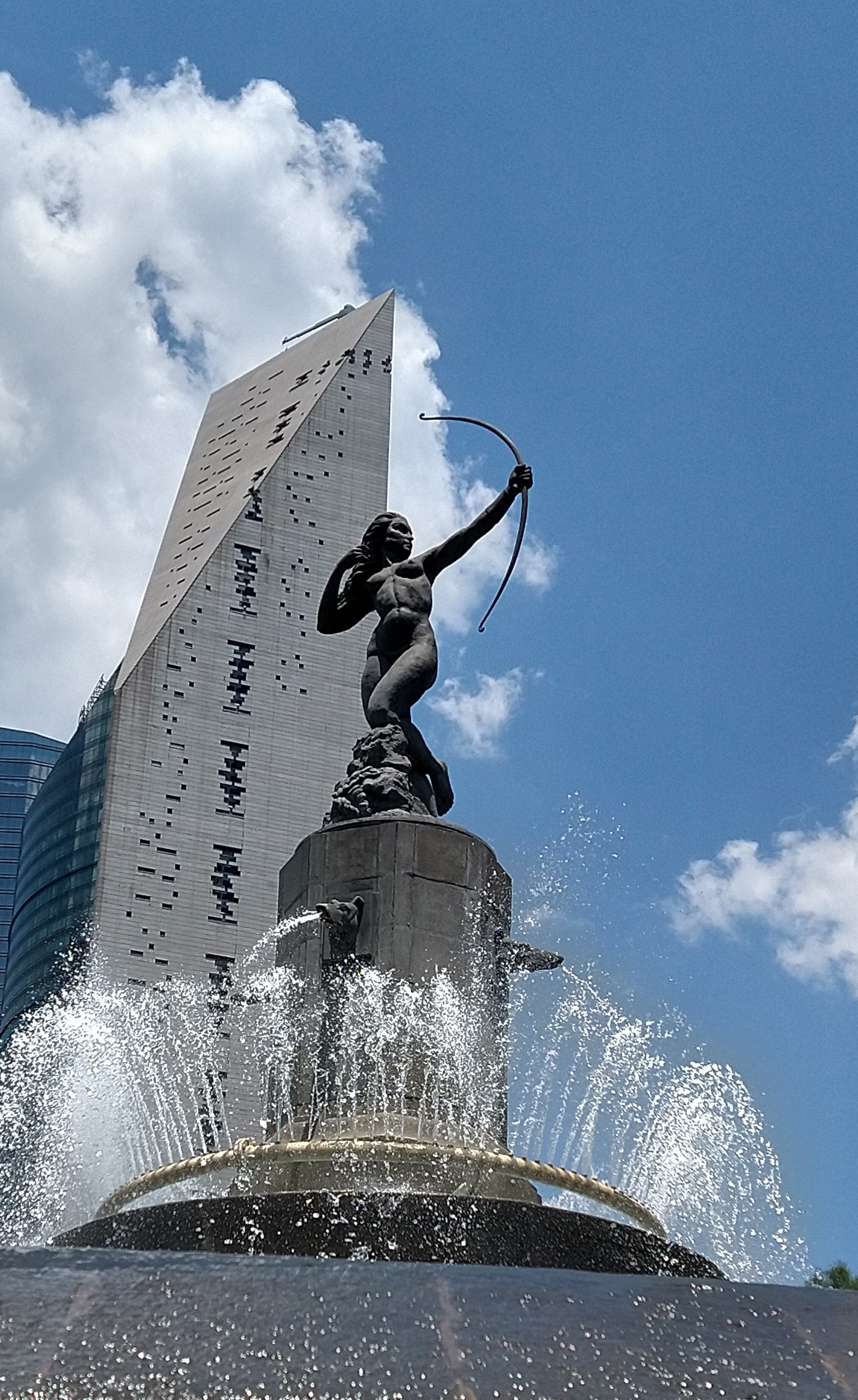
Diana the Huntress Fountain, one of the collaborations between Mendiola, Olaguíbel, and Martínez

President Lázaro Cárdenas nationalized all the petroleum reserves, facilities, and foreign oil companies on 18 March 1938. This led to the creation of the state-owned company Pemex.

Between 1940 and 1970, Mexico experienced sustained economic growth known as the Mexican miracle. During this period, the government commissioned monumental sculptures across the country, influenced by Mexican muralism, socialist realism, and academicism.

Sculptor Juan Fernando Olaguíbel was influenced by a blend of classical and modern sculptural traditions. Before 1952, he had collaborated with the architect Vicente Mendiola on several artworks, including the Monumento a los Niños Héroes in Guadalajara and Diana the Huntress Fountain in Mexico City. Mendiola's architectural style drew inspiration from the Art Deco movement.

== Design and installation ==
One of the original sketches proposed by Mendiola for the sculptural work

One of Mendiola's original ideas was to build two semicircular fountains in the traffic circle, with a monumental pillar at the center. It was initially planned to be 60 meters (200 ft) tall and to feature an allegorical message. Over time, the pillar's height was reduced to 18 meters (59 ft). Mendiola also created preliminary sketches for sculptures that were never ultimately built.

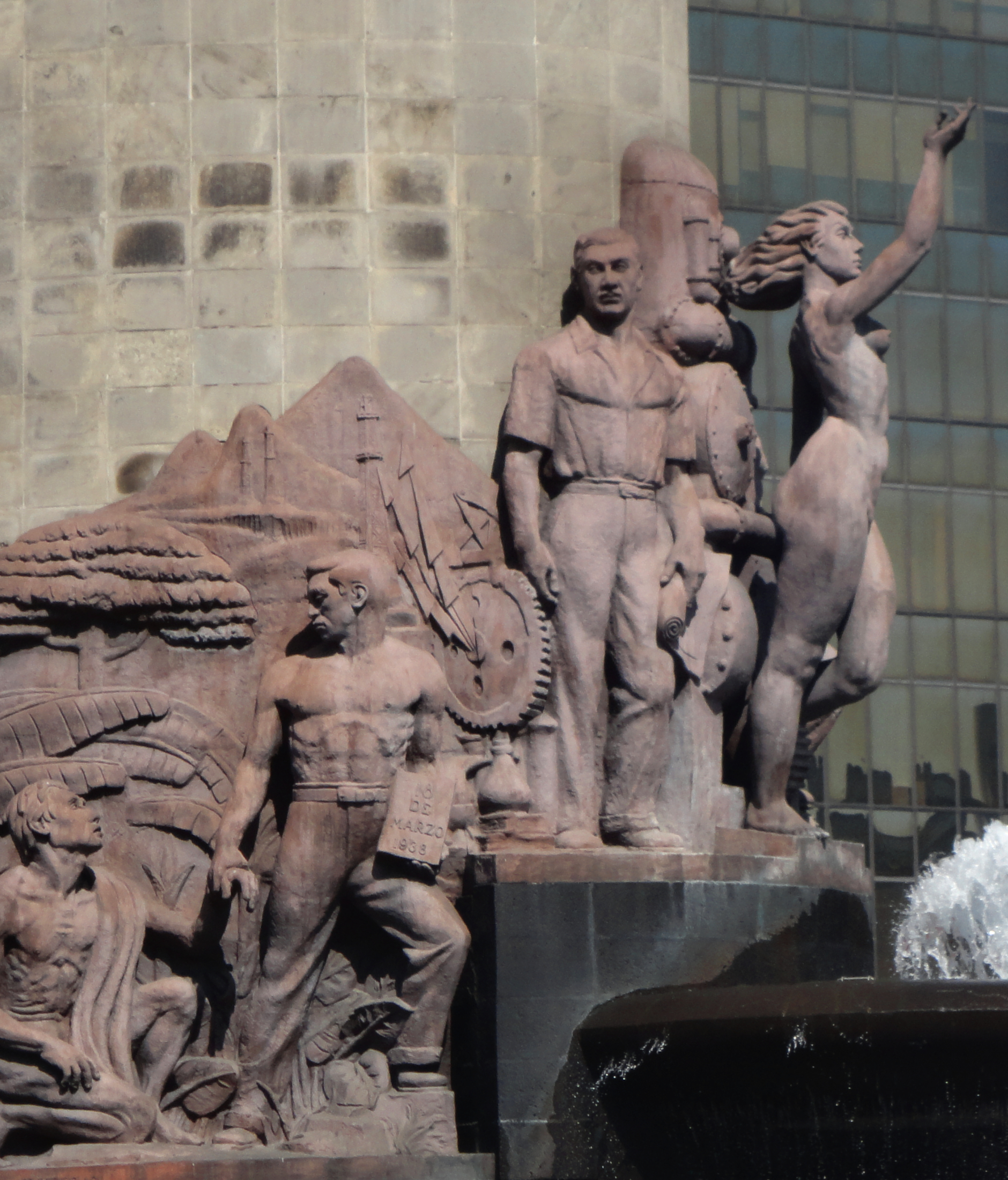
Close-up of the south sculptural group. Mendiola's self-portrait appears on the left, holding the hand of an Indigenous man

Originally, a gas station was located in that location. In order to address the change in elevation along the street, a raised earth platform covered with grass was constructed to the north. The Fuente de Petróleos consists of a series of tiered fountains surrounding a stone pillar, which is covered by sculptures. In the final version, Olaguíbel created two sculptural groups. The one on the north side includes three workers drilling an oil well. They are next to oil derricks and a railroad. The group on the south side includes a kneeling Indigenous man being saved by another worker, who holds a law document reading 18 de marzo 1938 (18 March 1938). At his side, one worker holds blueprints and, between another worker standing in a proud pose, a monumental wingless nude Victoria raises, from whose feet water flows like oil. Oil drums and pipelines stand behind them. The proud worker and the saving worker are self-portraits of Olaguíbel and Mendiola, respectively. Helvia Martínez Verdayes, who had previously modeled for the Diana the Huntress Fountain, also posed for the Fuente de Petróleos. Before doing so, she had worked as a secretary at Pemex in 1942.

The fountain, officially the Monumento a la Industria Petrolera de México, was installed in a roundabout along the intersection of Paseo de la Reforma and the Anillo Periférico. The traffic circle is 55 meters (180 ft) wide, and the monument was built with tuff stone and 18 metric tons (18 long tons; 20 short tons) of bronze. The area around the fountain originally had adjacent gardens, which were later removed following the construction of a second level along the Periférico highway.

Construction of the Fuente de Petróleos was decreed by Miguel Alemán Valdés, and he inaugurated it on 18 March 1952. Ernesto P. Uruchurtu, later regent of the Federal District Department, noted that the traffic intersection had been designed to avoid affecting the visibility of the fountain or the adjacent trees in Chapultepec Park.

== Description ==
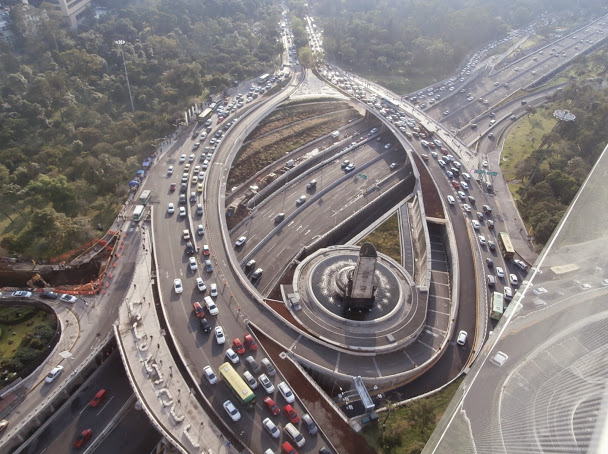
Aerial view of the roundabout

The fountain's sculptures feature the years 1810 and 1821, referencing the Mexican War of Independence; 1938, the year of the oil expropriation; and 1952, the year of the monument's inauguration. They also have inscribed in Spanish the following texts:

The situation created by the oil companies effectively meant the abandonment of the exploitation to which they were dedicated, which the law considered to be of public utility.

And

The stance adopted by the foreign companies made it impossible to protect and preserve the wealth contained in the oil fields, as well as to ensure their proper use and development. Any one of these circumstances would have been sufficient on its own, much more so all of them together, for the government to find itself under the imperative necessity of expropriating the oil.

The Fuente de Petróleos commemorates the nationalization of the Mexican oil industry and honors the workers affected by the departure of foreign oil companies who made significant efforts to keep the industry operating.

For Daniel Schávelzon, the artwork is academicist with classical influences and incorporates nineteenth-century elements intended to represent progress, industry, and abundance. For him, the depiction of Victoria and the nude, subjugated Indigenous man reflects a nineteenth-century classical aesthetic designed to appeal to elite audiences.
