= Mexican oil expropriation =

1938 nationalization of all Mexican oil supplies into a state-owned oil company, PEMEX

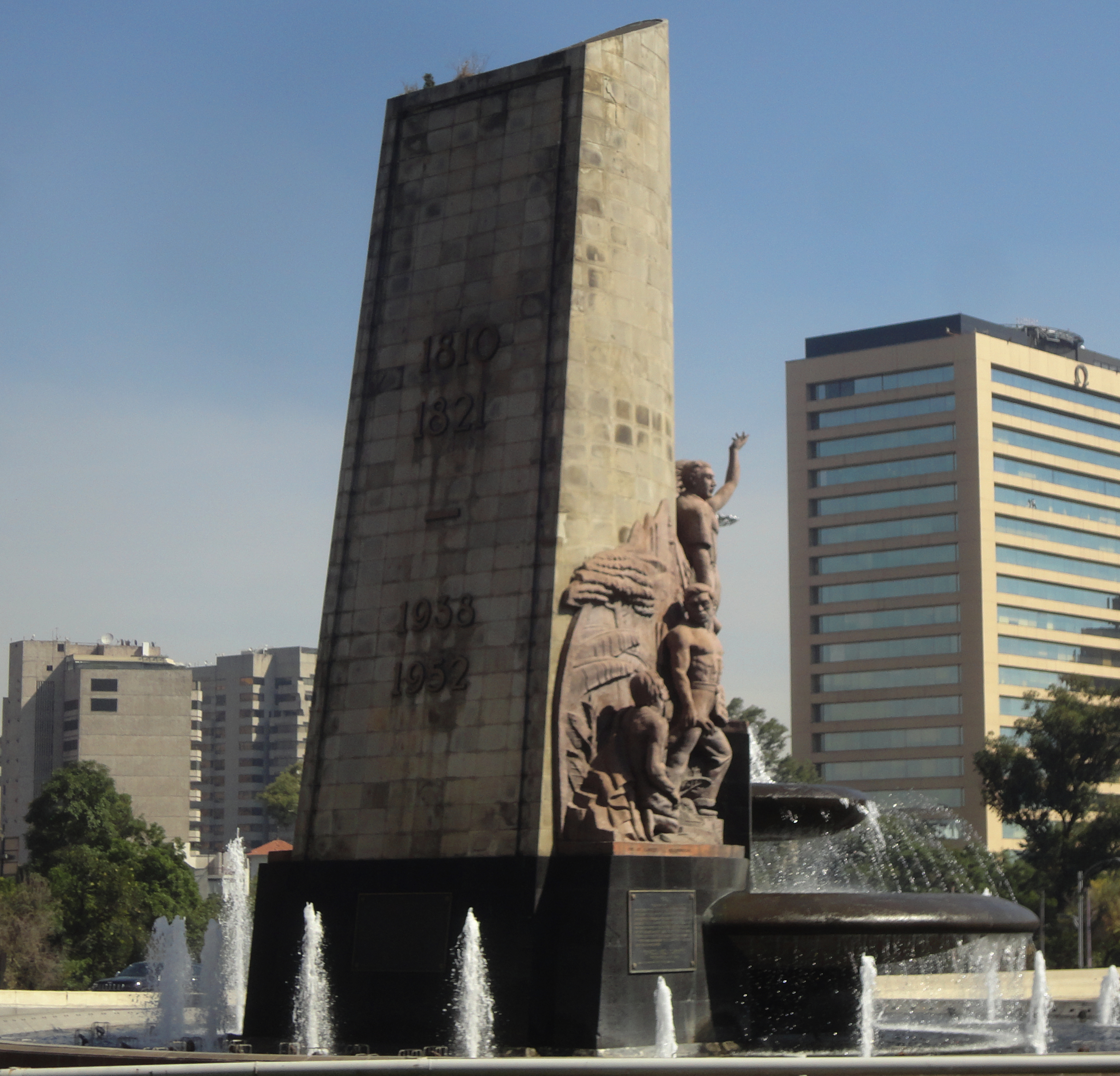
Fountain of Mexican Petroleum (Monument), in the Paseo de la Reforma and Anillo Periférico, Mexico City

The Mexican oil expropriation (Spanish: expropiación petrolera en México) was the nationalization of all petroleum reserves, facilities, and foreign oil companies in Mexico on March 18, 1938. In accordance with Article 27 of the Constitution of 1917, President Lázaro Cárdenas declared that all mineral and oil reserves found within Mexico belong to the nation. The Mexican government established a state-owned petroleum company, Petróleos Mexicanos, or PEMEX.

For a short period, this measure caused an international boycott of Mexican products in the following years, especially by the United States, the United Kingdom, and the Netherlands, as well as large foreign oil companies who had expertise refining Mexican oil. However, with the outbreak of World War II and the alliance between Mexico and the Allies, the disputes with private companies over compensation were resolved. The anniversary, March 18, is now a Mexican civic holiday.

== Background ==
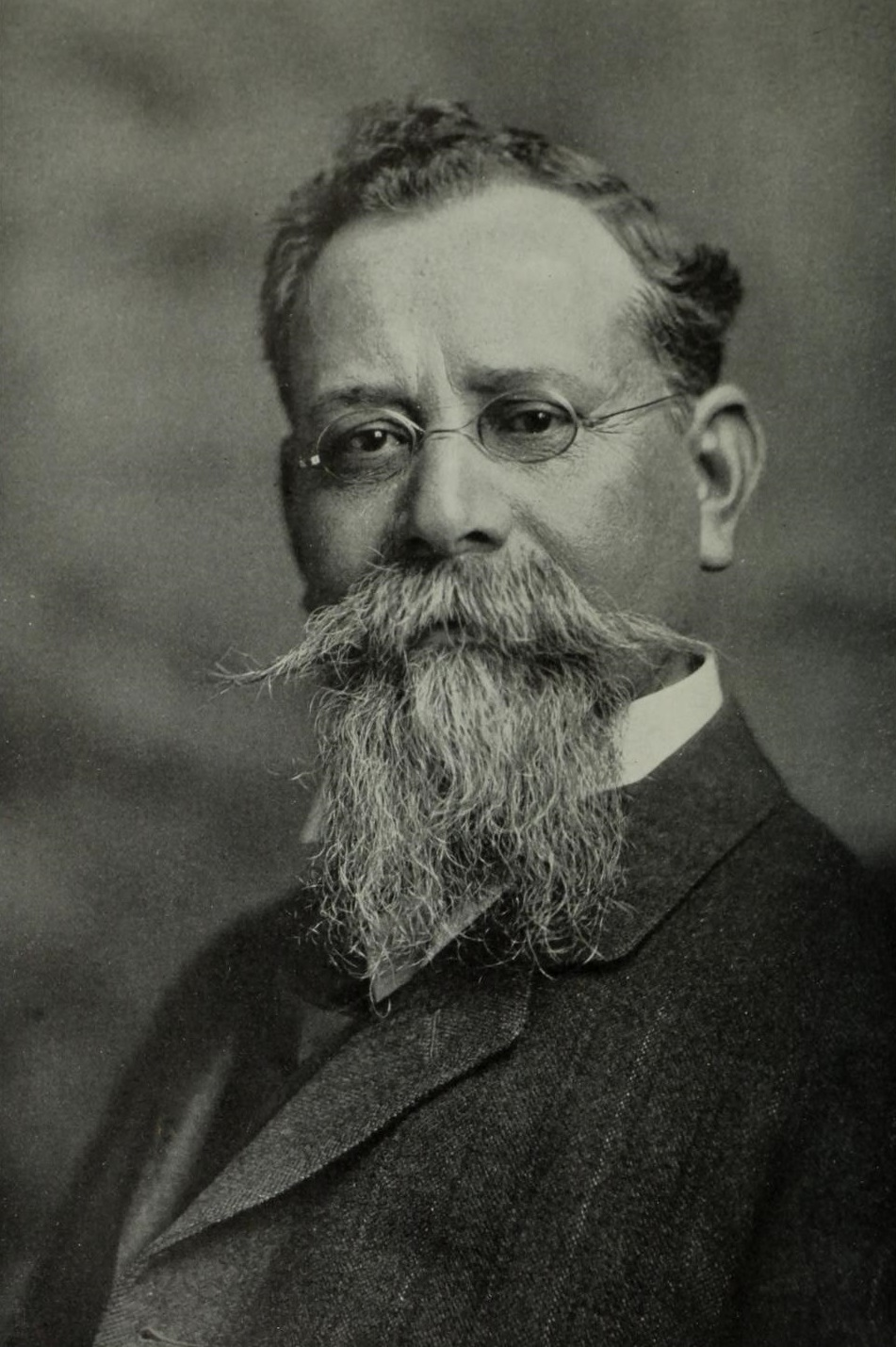
Venustiano Carranza, President of Mexico, on the recommendations of the Petroleum Technical Commission, promoted the restitution of the wealth of the subsoil to the nation, which had been yielded during the Porfiriato to the land owners by issuing the issuance of the Code of Minería of 1894 and the law oil company of 1901, both regulations were contrary to Spanish legislative system inherited since colonial times, that had remained in force in Mexico.

On August 16, 1935, the Petroleum Workers Union of Mexico (Sindicato de Trabajadores Petroleros de la República Mexicana) was formed and one of the first actions was the writing of a lengthy draft contract transmitted to the petroleum companies demanding a 40-hour working week, a full salary paid in the event of sickness, and the payment of 65 million pesos towards benefits and wages. The foreign oil companies refused to sign the agreement, and counter offered with a payment of 14 million pesos toward wages and benefits.

On November 3, 1937, the union demanded that the companies sign the collective agreement and six months later, on May 17, 1938, the union summoned a strike in case their demands were not met. On May 28 the strike became effective throughout the country.

The petroleum workers' struggle was well regarded by the President and the population despite problems caused by the petroleum shortage. Due to these problems, the union accepted a lift of the strike on June 9, 1938, after the president urged them to present their case before the General Arbitration and Conciliation Board (Junta General de Conciliación y Arbitraje). In July, as instructed by the arbitration board, a commission of financial experts was formed that investigated the petroleum companies' finances, concluding that their profits easily permitted them to cover the demands of the workers. The report stated that just one company (El Aguila) had received annual profits of over 55 million pesos. The arbitration board concluded that the oil companies should pay 26 million pesos for wages and benefits to the workers. The companies, however, insisted the demands would cripple production and bankrupt them, and refused to pay. The president once again intervened to mediate between the parties, and met with oil company representatives at the National Palace on September 2. In this meeting, one of the El Aguila representatives took issue with the description of it being a foreign company, and stated that El Aguila was a Mexican company. In response, Jesus Silva Herzog (present in the meeting) responded with a financial newspaper from London that cited a report from the Royal Dutch Shell of 1928: "Our Mexican subsidiary, Oil Company El Aguila, has obtained good returns during the last fiscal cycle." It was also explained that El Aguila de Mexico would set the price of an oil barrel at 1.96 when sold to The Eagle Shipping company. This price was below the market value of US$3.19 per barrel. This way profits would be hidden to the Mexican treasury, and taxes were saved.

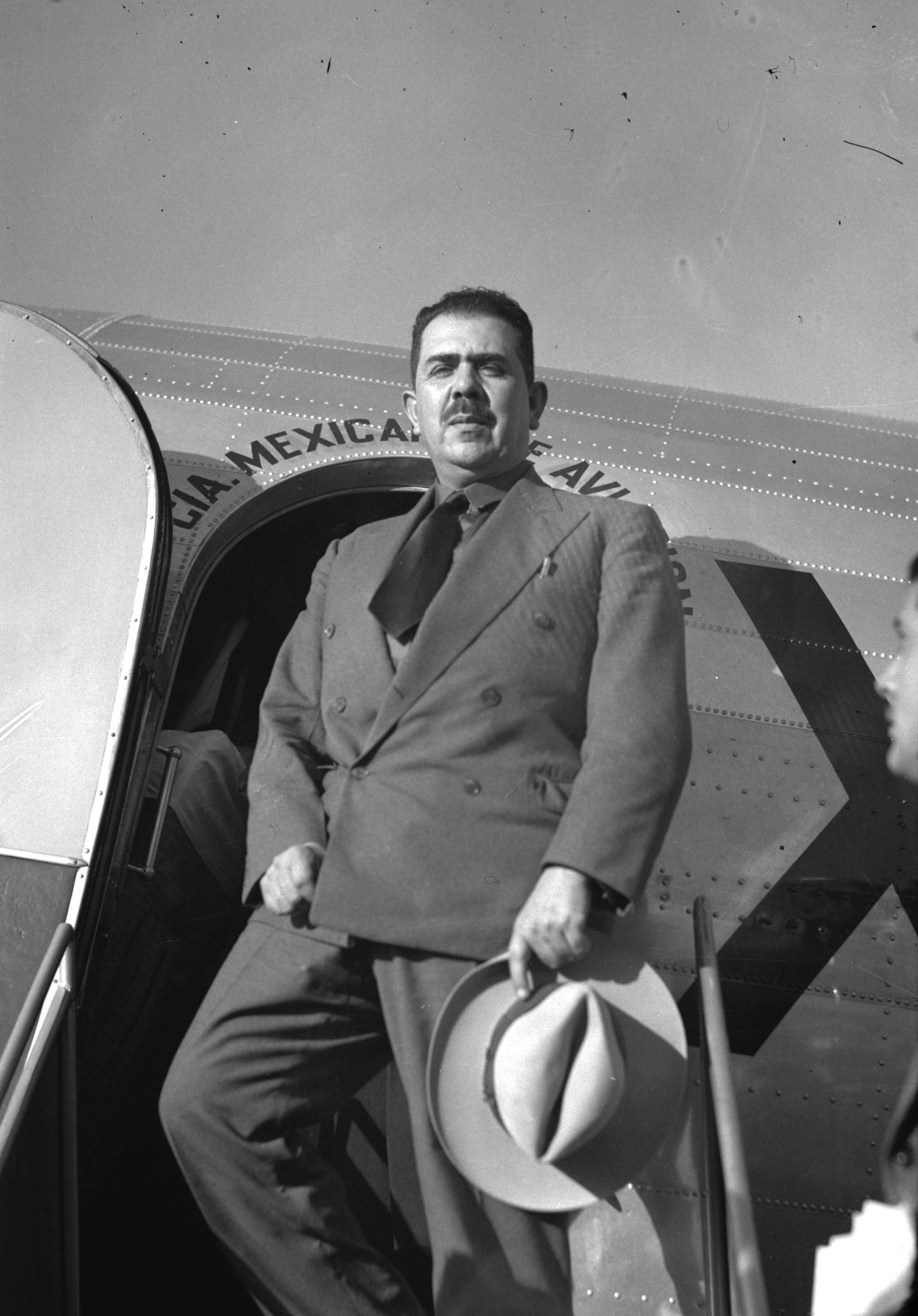
Lázaro Cárdenas del Río, president of Mexico from 1934 to 1940, implemented a nationalist policy, interceded during the conflict between workers and companies repeatedly, on March 18, 1938, through a speech directed by radio to the nation, released the expropriatory decree.

However, on December 8, 1937 the companies had hired other unemployed workers and had not responded to the arbitration board. On December 18, the board gave a verdict in favor of the union by means of a "laudo" (binding judgment in arbitration) which demanded that the companies fulfill the requirements of the petitions and pay 26 million pesos in lost salaries. The petroleum companies initiated a lawsuit on January 2, 1938, before the Mexican Supreme Court to protect their property from the labor union and arbitration board, which denied the request.

Consequently, the foreign companies rebelled against the imposed contract, and the maximum Judicial Authority responded by rendering a decision on March 1, 1938, giving the companies until March 7 to pay the 26 million pesos penalty.

In 1935, all companies in the business of extraction, processing, and exporting of oil in Mexico were foreign companies with foreign capital. These companies attempted to block the creation of labor unions and used legal and illegal tactics to do so. However, the creation of individual unions within each company was made possible, but work conditions differed from one another.

On December 27, 1935, the Sindicato Único de Trabajadores Petroleros was created, despite the legal opposition in the states of Tamaulipas and Veracruz. On January 29, 1936, this union joined the Comité de Defensa Proletaria ("Committee of Proletarian Defense") which would become in February the Confederation of Mexican Workers (CTM), which would celebrated its first convention on July 20, in which it was proposed a project of general contracts for each oil company and it was decided on a strike to push towards an agreement.

Lázaro Cárdenas intervened between the union and the oil companies in order to force an agreement on the contract. The strike was delayed for six months, but the companies never agreed to the contract and on May 28, 1936, the strike took place. The entire country was paralyzed for 12 days, with consumers unable to buy gasoline. Cárdenas convinced the union to end the strike until a decision by the companies could be made. However, the companies declared themselves unable to meet the demands because of financial problems. Cárdenas ordered an investigation and on August 3, and the findings were that the Mexican oil industry produced higher returns than the U.S. oil industry.

== Legal conflicts ==
After the publication of the findings, the oil companies threatened to leave Mexico and take all of their capital with them. The government entity in charge of the conflict between these companies and the union, the Junta Federal de Conciliación y Arbitraje (Federal Conciliation and Arbitration Board), was not able to make a decision quickly and the union declared a 24-hour strike in protest on December 8.

On December 18, the Arbitration Board declared in favor of the union. The oil companies had to pay 26 million pesos of wages lost because of the strike, but they appealed to the Supreme Court. The Supreme Court then rejected the appeal and ordered them to raise salaries and improve working conditions for the union members. The oil companies protested this decision and President Cárdenas mediated a compromise; the union would accept 26 million pesos. Cárdenas offered to end the strike if the oil companies paid the sum. According to witnesses of this meeting, representatives of the oil companies asked the President "Who can guarantee that the strike will be over", to which the President replied "I, the President of the Republic." After the businessmen asked with sarcasm "You?" President Cárdenas ended the meeting saying "Sirs, we are finished!". Cárdenas moved to expropriate the oil industry and create a national oil company, PEMEX.

== Oil Expropriation Day, March 18, 1938 ==
On March 18, 1938, President Cárdenas embarked on the expropriation of all oil resources and facilities by the state, nationalizing the U.S. and Anglo-Dutch (Mexican Eagle Petroleum Company) operating companies. Two hours before informing his cabinet of his decision, he made the announcement on the radio to the rest of the country. Five days later, a crowd of 200,000 (according to the press) rallied in the Zócalo in support of Cárdenas's action. On April 12, 1938, a crowd of thousands of all classes gathered in front of the Palacio de Bellas Artes to make donations to pay the debt to foreign companies. Donations varied from chickens to jewelry. (see photo).

On June 7, 1938, President Cárdenas issued a decree creating Petróleos Mexicanos (PEMEX), with exclusive rights over exploration, extraction, refining, and commercialization of oil in Mexico. On June 20, PEMEX started operations.

The legality of the expropriation was contested in the courts. On December 2, 1939, the Supreme Court of Mexico upheld that the expropriation was lawful.

== Opposition ==
=== International ===
In retaliation, the oil companies initiated a public relations campaign against Mexico, urging people to stop buying Mexican goods and lobbying to embargo U.S. technology to Mexico. Many foreign governments closed their markets to Mexican oil, hoping that PEMEX would drown in its own oil. However, the U.S. government of Franklin Delano Roosevelt had issued the Good Neighbor Policy, aiming to recalibrate U.S.-Latin American relations; the U.S. government did not intervene to aid U.S. oil companies affected by the Mexican expropriation. Mexican finances suffered due to the boycott, the Mexican peso was devalued, and an immediate 20% increase in prices was suffered by the Mexican population. In a trip to New York to negotiate with oil companies, Mexican treasury minister, Suarez, serendipitously met an American intermediate, William Rhodes Davis from Davis Oil Company, who had a refinery in Europe, and asked for a collaboration. Davis mediated between Mexico and Germany to a barter agreement where Mexico would give crude oil to Davis, who then would provide refined oil products to Germany in exchange for machinery to Mexico. By 1940, Mexico had an agreement with the American Sinclair Oil Corporation to sell crude oil to the U.S., and the full-scale war in Europe guaranteed that Mexican oil would have international customers. PEMEX developed into one of the largest oil companies in the world and helped Mexico become the world's seventh-largest oil exporter.

The British government withdrew its ambassador from Mexico in May 1938.

=== Domestic ===
Saturnino Cedillo, a cacique from San Luis Potosí and former Secretary of Agriculture, showed the strongest opposition to Cárdenas's measures. Cedillo had in the past supported Cárdenas in a conflict with ex-President Plutarco Elías Calles, but disagreed with his plan of reforms. On May 15 of the same year, the state congress of San Luis Potosí issued a decree where it refused to recognize Cárdenas as president and declared that the expropiación petrolera did not benefit the economy of Mexico. Cárdenas did not consider this a serious threat and minimized efforts to suppress the rebellion, instead choosing persuasion. The US government did not support the rebellion because it was more concerned that fascist and communist movements from Europe would spread to Mexico.

The key to the success of the measures taken by Cárdenas was not just to control the opposition, but to develop and train qualified domestic personnel who could keep afloat an industry that had been maintained thus far by foreign management. The government relied on the Sindicato de Trabajadores Petroleros de la República Mexicana (STPRM, or the Union of Oil Workers of the Mexican Republic) to resolve disagreements over the management of oil resources, and deal with threats of strikes and sabotage. In spite of technical challenges, the local workers who replaced the foreign technicians succeeded in making the new nationalized oil industry work. Josephus Daniels, U.S. ambassador to Mexico, explained to President Franklin D. Roosevelt and Secretary of State Cordell Hull that Cárdenas' reforms could not be undone, since his position as president and the position of PEMEX were secure. PEMEX was and remains a source of collective national pride, and is an international symbol of Mexico.

Critics of the expropriation argue that since PEMEX took control of the nation's petroleum, it has suffered from corruption in administrations since that of Cárdenas, and point to its political use by PRI (Partido Revolucionario Institucional) and the PAN (Partido Accion Nacional). In addition, the casus belli of the expropriation was a wage hike of 26 million pesos. In fact, in the short run following nationalization, not only was the promised wage hike postponed indefinitely, wages were actually cut. A tug of war continues between capitalist strategists who favor privatization and popular support for PEMEX as a nationalization success and the backbone of Mexico's economic independence from manipulation by foreign owners and investors. In 2013 a series of privatization measures were undertaken by the President Peña Nieto; in 2019 attempts to walk back such measures and regain Mexican national control over PEMEX were begun by the populist left government of López Obrador.

== See also ==
- Nationalization of oil supplies
- Economic nationalism
- Petroleum industry in Mexico
