= Rachid Tabti =

Algerian spy

- رشيد ثابتي
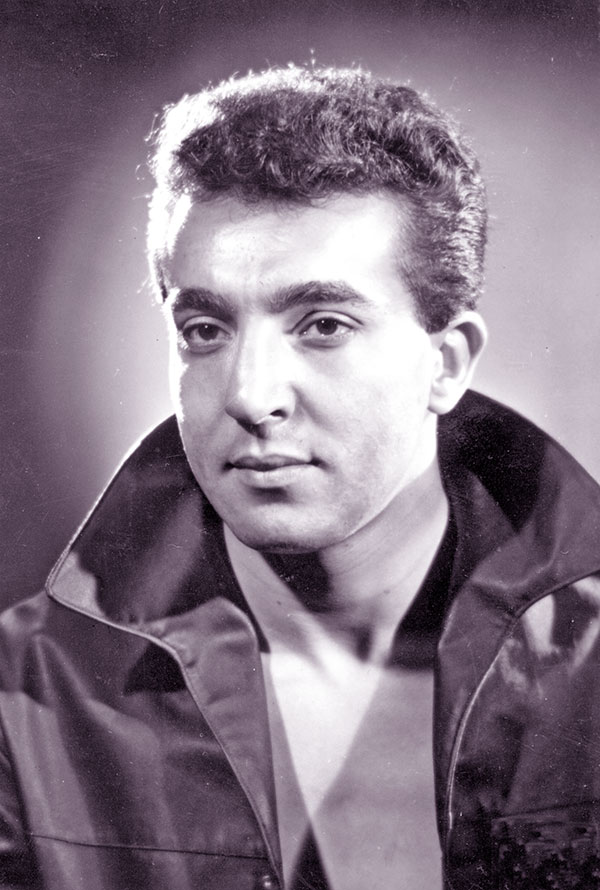
- Rachid Tabti in the 1950s.
- Born: May 27, 1930; Constantine, Algeria
- Died: July 30, 2009; El Biar, Algiers, Algeria
- Other names: Richard; Prince of Marmara; Duke of Adrianople
- Citizenship: Algerian
- Occupations: Spy, Lawyer, boxer, actor

Rachid Tabti (Arabic: رشيد ثابتي; 27 May 1930 – 30 July 2009) was an Algerian spy, lawyer, actor, and boxer. Born in Constantine, he studied law and political science in France, where he also competed as a boxer, winning the Paris and French university welterweight championships before pursuing a brief acting career in French and American cinema.He is best known for his role in assisting Algeria during negotiations leading up to the nationalization of oil in 1971. Operating under the false identity of "Richard, Prince of Marmara," a supposed Turkish dignitary, he infiltrated French diplomatic and economic circles and cultivated a relationship with a secretary at the French Ministry of Foreign Affairs, obtaining hundreds of classified documents that were passed to Algerian intelligence.Arrested in February 1970 and tried before the Cour de sûreté de l'État, he was sentenced to ten years in prison before being released and expelled to Algeria in July 1971 as part of a prisoner exchange. After his return, he practiced as a lawyer at the Supreme Court of Algeria. He died in El Biar, Algiers, in 2009 at the age of 79.

== Biography ==
=== Early life and education ===
Rachid Tabti was born on 27 May 1930 in Constantine into a well-off family. In 1950, he moved to France to complete his secondary education. After earning his baccalaureate, he enrolled at the University of Paris Faculty of Law, obtaining a law degree, followed by diplomas from the Paris Institute of Political Studies and the Institute of Higher International Studies in the early 1960s.

=== Sporting and cultural activities ===
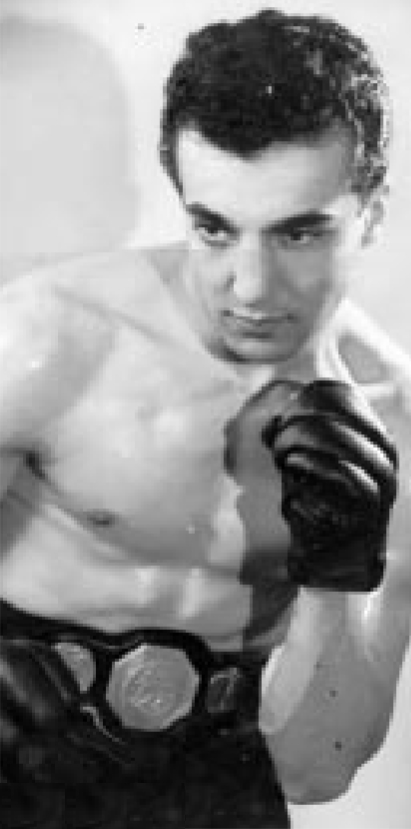
Rachid Tabti as a boxer.

While pursuing his studies, Tabti competed as a boxer. He won the Paris and French university welterweight championships in 1952–1953, as well as an amateur boxing competition in 1954–1955. He later turned professional under trainer Jean Bretonnel, winning 12 of his 14 bouts before retiring in 1957 due to chronic asthma.

At the same time, he appeared in minor roles in several French and American films, including The Count of Monte Cristo (1954), Le Grand Jeu (1954), and Nana (1955). In 1960, he played the role of a boxer in the television crime series Les Cinq Dernières Minutes, in an episode entitled “Un poing final.”

He later worked intermittently as a sales representative for Éditions Rombaldi, a bookseller on Boulevard Saint-Germain, and a physical education teacher at Lycée Albert-Camus in Bois-Colombes.

=== Espionage activities ===
During the 1950s, amid the Algerian War, Tabti became affiliated with the Ministère de l'Armement et des Liaisons générales (MALG) and supplied intelligence to the National Liberation Front (FLN) in Paris. After Algeria's independence, he joined the Sécurité Militaire (SM) service.

In 1963, he was recruited by the Embassy of Algeria in France as a secretary, later working briefly at the Ministry of Foreign Affairs in Algiers before returning to Paris on intelligence assignments focused on Franco-Algerian economic relations.

To avoid detection, he was officially struck from the diplomatic corps in January 1965. He subsequently took up the position of public relations advisor at Sonatrach, the national oil company of Algeria.

From the mid-1960s onwards, Tabti infiltrated French diplomatic and economic circles under the false identity of “Richard, Prince of Marmara,” a supposed dignitary linked to the Marmara Island in Turkey. He also used the title “Duke of Adrianople” and introduced his wife, Monique Deutch, as “Countess of Cardessi.” To reinforce his image as a wealthy prince, he lived in a luxury apartment in Paris’s 16th arrondissement, provided by Algerian intelligence services, and drove an Alfa Romeo.

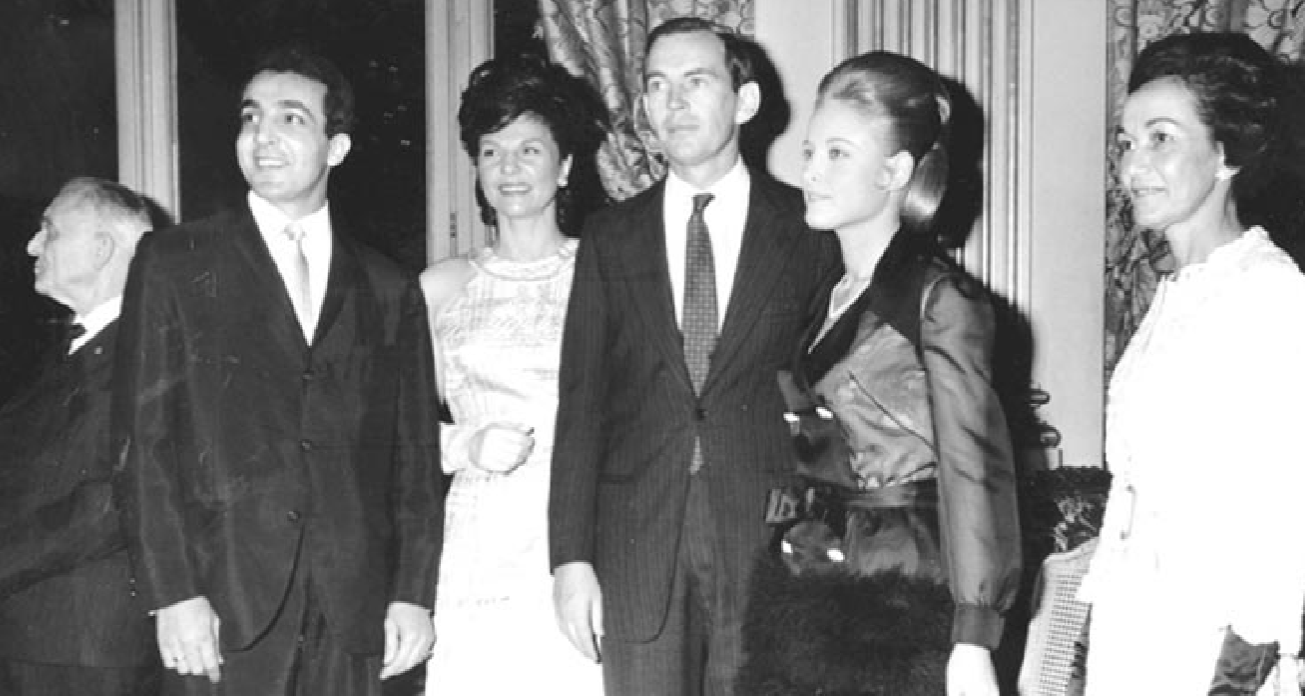
Rachid Tabti (left) with Béatrice Halegua and Christiaan Barnard.

He cultivated relationships with secretaries in various ministries, particularly at the Ministry of Foreign Affairs and the Ministry of Finance. In early summer 1966, he met Béatrice Halegua, secretary to Jean-Pierre Brunet, Director-General for Economic Affairs at the French Ministry of Foreign Affairs and administrator of Elf-ERAP, who was directly involved in the oil negotiations between France and Algeria. Through seduction, gifts, and promises of marriage, Tabti persuaded her to provide him with confidential documents.

For more than two years, Tabti used this relationship to obtain hundreds of confidential documents, some of which were classified as Secret Défense, which were then passed on to his liaison officer Ouali Boumaza, a special advisor in the office of the Minister of Industry and Energy. These notes included a report about a meeting at the Élysée Palace and assessments of French financial and diplomatic strategy.

These disclosures reportedly enabled Algeria to anticipate French countermeasures related to the planned oil nationalization, challenging the dominance of French oil companies established under the Évian Accords.

Among the intelligence transmitted were details concerning the 1969 devaluation of the French franc, allowing Algeria to reallocate its foreign exchange reserves in advance.

=== Arrest, trial, and imprisonment ===
By late 1969, the Direction de la surveillance du territoire (DST) suspected that there had been leaks. they set a trap by placing a fake report on oil negotiations between France and the Soviet Union in Jean-Pierre Brunet's safe, which provoked a reaction from the Algerian side and drew the investigators' attention to the diplomat's entourage.

Tabti was arrested on 25 February 1970 during a search of his apartment, where a briefcase of classified documents was found. Ouali Boumaza was arrested shortly thereafter when he came to retrieve the documents.

On 28 October 1970, both men were tried before the Cour de sûreté de l'État and sentenced to ten and eight years in prison respectively for “intelligence with agents of a foreign power.” Halegua received a five-year suspended sentence, the court ruling she had acted in good faith and been deceived.

Tabti served just over a year, including detention at La Santé Prison and the Melun detention center, before being released and expelled to Algeria on 24 July 1971. He and Boumaza were exchanged for French nationals held in Algeria on espionage charges.

=== Later life and death ===
After returning to Algeria, Tabti practiced as a lawyer at the Supreme Court.

Suffering from Parkinson’s disease, attributed by some accounts to his boxing career, he died at his home in El Biar, a suburb of Algiers, on 30 July 2009 at the age of 79. His death remained largely unknown to the public until 2011.

== See also ==
- Cherif Guellal
- Nationalization of oil in Algeria
