= Glorieta de las y los desaparecidos =

The Glorieta de las y los desaparecidos (Roundabout of the Disappeared) may refer to two roundabouts that were unofficially renamed as such:

- Glorieta de la Palma, in Mexico City, Mexico
- Glorieta de los Niños Héroes, in Guadalajara, Jalisco, Mexico
