= Paasha Mahdavi =

Academic and political science expert

- Born: Minnesota, United States
- Employer: University of California, Santa Barbara

Academic background
- Education: Columbia University (BA); Stanford University (MA); University of California, Los Angeles (MS, PhD)
- Thesis: The Politics of Oil Nationalizations (2015)

Academic work
- Discipline: Political science Energy politics

Paasha Mahdavi is an academic, researcher and author known for his expertise in political science. Much of his work has centred on the energy industry and its connections to climate change. He currently serves as the Director of the Energy Governance and Political Economy Lab at UC Santa Barbara.

== Early life and education ==
Mahdavi earned his BA in economics at Columbia University, graduating with Departmental Honors in 2006. After completing his BA, Mahdavi worked as an analyst in ICF International’s Wholesale Power division from 2006 to 2007. Mahdavi returned to education shortly afterwards at Stanford University, where he completed his M.A. in 2009. His M.A. was in International Policy with a concentration on Energy Policy. Much of his research was centred on the Middle Eastern and North African oil and gas markets, with a focus in the study of the National Iranian Oil Company.

Mahdavi completed both is M.S. in Statistics and his PhD in Political Science at UCLA, graduating in 2015. In April 2015, Mahdavi published "Explaining the Oil Advantage: Effects of Natural Resource Wealth on Incumbent Reelection in Iran" in the peer-reviewed journal, World Politics. It was published while studying for his PhD and studied how government access to revenue from nationally owned oil companies can affect political outcomes. Using data from Iran's parliamentary elections, Mahdavi found re-election was more likely in single-member districts, while also increasing the understanding of resource politics in authoritarian governments. He also published two articles in the Washington Post discussing connections between into Iran's political relationship with the oil industry.

== Career and research ==
Following his studies, Mahdavi became an assistant professor at Georgetown University as part of the McCourt School of Public Policy. He published the "Oil and Gas Data, 1932–2014" dataset in the same year, which was co-authored by Michael L. Ross. Hosted on Harvard Dataverse it provides a global time-series record of oil and natural gas production, prices, exports, and net exports from 1932 through 2014.

Beginning in 2016, Mahdavi served as a Global Future Council Fellow with the World Economic Forum's Council on the Future of Energy. He remained in the position until 2018, with the council providing strategic insight and recommendations on the transformation of global energy systems during that period. While at Georgetown, he published the Global Progress and Backsliding on Gasoline Taxes and Subsidies paper in Nature Energy.

Mahdavi left his position at Georgetown University in 2018, to become assistant professor of Political Science at UC Santa Barbara. He published "Institutions and the ‘Resource Curse’: Evidence From Cases of Oil-Related Bribery" in Comparative Political Studies in 2019. It studied the nuances of why some oil-rich countries face major corruption while others don't.

In 2020, Mahdavi released his first full-length monograph about the political stances of resource nationalization with Cambridge University Press titled, Power Grab: Political Survival through Extractive Resource Nationalization. Power Grab studies how vulnerable authoritarian leaders use oil nationalization as a political tool to remain in power, and how the theory can apply to other countries with resources other than oil. A review in War on the Rocks praises Mahdavi's analysis, backed with "rigorous qualitative and quantitative evidence." Continuing on the theme of oil companies, Mahdavi's research featured in The Washington Post during the same year, which questioned the timeline of oil companies "going green," and if it was happening as quickly as some corporations were suggesting. Mahdavi has provided commentary on oil politics and climate change to media outlets such as the BBC, CBS, the Guardian, and NPR.

Mahdavi became an associate professor at UCSB in 2022. In the same year The Journal of Politics published Mahdavi's article titled "Why Do Governments Tax or Subsidize Fossil Fuels?" The article examined why governments adopt polar opposite policies toward fossil fuels depending on a country's specific economic and political circumstances. Mahdavi demonstrated that there is a correlation between the level of revenue governments receive from oil and gas production and whether they choose to impose higher or lower rates of fossil fuel tax.

In 2025, Mahdavi wrote an op-ed in the Santa Barbara Independent, discussing the climate and environmental impacts of reopening the Sable Offshore pipeline. This was before politicians in Washington had indicated the pipeline was due to reopen, which had been closed since the Refugio oil spill in 2015.

== 2035 Initiative ==
Mahdavi is the co-founder of UC Santa Barbara's 2035 Initiative, which was first founded in 2020 along with Matto Mildenberger and Leah Stokes. The initiative is a UCSB-based think tank designed to bridge academic research and real-world climate policies and its main goal is to accelerate decarbonization. It is hoped this can be achieved by combining engineering analysis and both political and public engagement.
