= Nationalization =

Transfer of privately owned assets to the national government

Nationalisation (nationalization in American English) is the process of transforming privately owned assets into public assets by bringing them under the public ownership of a national government or state. Nationalization contrasts with privatization and with demutualization. When previously nationalized assets are privatized and subsequently returned to public ownership at a later stage, they are said to have undergone renationalization (or deprivatization). Industries often subject to nationalization include telecommunications, electric power, fossil fuels, iron ore, railways, airlines, media, postal services, banks, and water (sometimes called the commanding heights of the economy), and in many jurisdictions such entities have no history of private ownership.

Nationalization may occur with or without financial compensation to the former owners. Nationalization is distinguished from property redistribution in that the government retains control of nationalized property. Some nationalizations take place in a highly political context. For example, in 1945 the French government seized the car-maker Renault because its owners had collaborated with the 1940–1944 Nazi occupiers of France.

Economists distinguish between nationalization and socialization, which refers to the process of restructuring the economic framework, organizational structure, and institutions of an economy on a socialist basis. By contrast, nationalization does not necessarily imply social ownership and the restructuring of the economic system. Historically, states have carried out nationalizations for various different purposes under a wide variety of different political systems and economic systems.

== Political support ==
Nationalization was one of the major mechanisms advocated by democratic socialists and social democrats for gradually transitioning to socialism. In this context, the goals of nationalization were to dispossess large capitalists, redirect the profits of industry to the public purse, and establish some form of workers' self-management as a precursor to the establishment of a socialist economic system.

Although sometimes undertaken as part of a strategy to build socialism, more commonly nationalization was also undertaken and used to protect and develop industries perceived as being vital to a nation's competitiveness (such as aerospace and shipbuilding), or to protect jobs in certain industries.

Nationalization has had varying levels of support throughout history. After the Second World War, nationalization was supported by social democratic and democratic socialist parties in Western Europe, Australia, and New Zealand. In the United States, potentially nationalizing healthcare is often a topic of political disagreement and makes frequent appearances in debates between political candidates. A 2020 poll shows that a majority (63%) of Americans support a nationalized healthcare system.

A re-nationalization occurs when state-owned assets are privatized and later nationalized again, often when a different political party or faction is in power. A re-nationalization process may also be called "reverse privatization". Nationalization has been used to refer to either direct state-ownership and management of an enterprise or to a government acquiring a large controlling share of a publicly listed corporation.

According to research by Paasha Mahdavi, leaders who consider nationalization face a dilemma: "nationalize and reap immediate gains while risking future prosperity, or maintain private operations, thereby passing on revenue windfalls but securing long-term fiscal streams." He argues that leaders "nationalize extractive resources to extend the duration of their power" by using "this increased capital to secure political support."

== Economic analysis ==
Nationalization can have positive and negative effects. In 2019, research based on studies from Greenwich University found that the nationalization of key services such as water, bus, railways and broadband in the United Kingdom could save £13bn every year.

Nationalization may reduce competition in the marketplace, which in turn reduces incentives to innovation and maintains high prices. In the short run, nationalization can provide a larger revenue stream for government but may cause that industry to falter depending on the motivations of the nationalizing party.

Nationalization was employed by the Panamanian Government towards the Panama Canal, which came under the Panama Canal Authority in 1999 to internationally positive effect. Likewise, the Suez Canal was nationalized multiple times throughout history. In Germany, the Federal Press [Bundesdruckerei] was nationalized in 2008 with positive revenue and net income since.

=== Trends ===
Studies have found that nationalization follows a cyclical trend. Nationalization rose in the 1960s and 1970s, followed by an increase in privatization in the 80s and 90s, followed again by an increase in nationalization in the 2000s and 2010s.

== Expropriation ==
Expropriation is the seizure of private property by a public agency for a purpose deemed to be in the public interest. It may also be used as a penalty for criminal proceedings. Expropriation differs from eminent domain in that the property owner is not compensated for the seized property. Unlike eminent domain, expropriation may also refer to the taking of private property by a private entity authorized by a government to take property in certain situations.

Due to political risks that are involved when countries engage in international business, it is important for investors to understand the expropriation risks and laws within each of the countries in which business is conducted.

== Marxist theory ==
The term appears as "expropriation of expropriators (ruling classes)" in Marxist theory, and also as the slogan "Loot the looters!" ("грабь награбленное"), which was very popular during the Russian Revolution. The term is also used to describe nationalization campaigns by communist states, such as dekulakization and collectivization in the USSR.

However, nationalization is not a specifically socialist strategy, and Marxism's founders were skeptical of its value. As Engels put it:

Therein precisely lies the rub; for, so long as the propertied classes remain at the helm, nationalisation never abolishes exploitation but merely changes its form — in the French, American or Swiss republics no less than in monarchist Central, and despotic Eastern, Europe.

— Friedrich Engels, Letter from Engels to Max Oppenheim, 24 March 1891

Nikolai Bukharin also criticised the term nationalisation, preferring the term statisation instead.

== See also ==
- Autarky
- Compulsory purchase
- Constitutional economics
- Confiscation
- Domestic sourcing
- Eminent domain
- Foreign exchange controls
- List of nationalizations by country
- List of privatizations by country
- Mixed economy
- Monetary sovereignty
- Municipalization
- Nationalization of oil supplies
- Planned economy
- Privatization
- Protectionism
- Public ownership
- Railway nationalization
- Sequestration
- State ownership
- State capitalism
- State socialism
- State sector
- Statism
