= Monumento a los Niños Héroes (Guadalajara) =

Monument in Guadalajara, Jalisco, Mexico

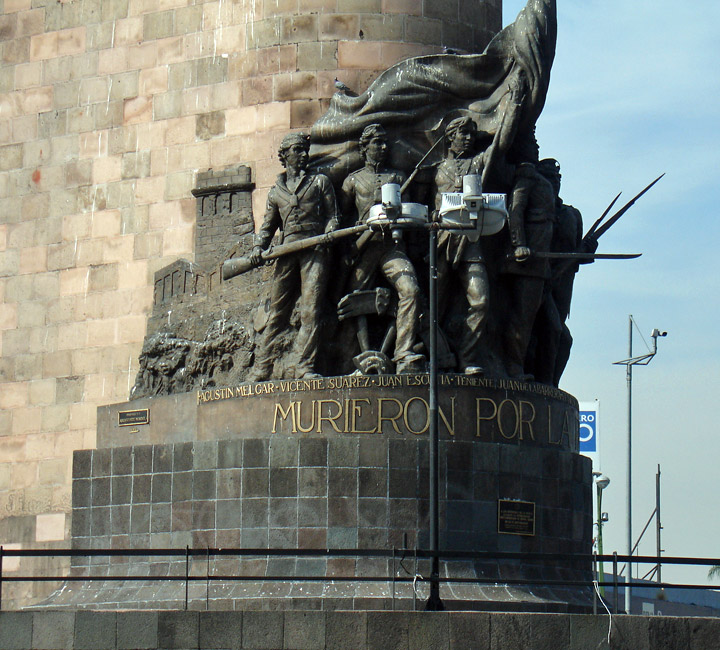
- The sculpture in 2010
- Interactive map of Monumento a los Niños Héroes
- Location: Guadalajara, Jalisco, Mexico
- Coordinates: 20°40′0.7″N 103°22′6.5″W
- Designer: Vicente Mendiola (architect); Juan Fernando Olaguíbel (sculptor)

The Monumento a los Niños Héroes is a monument in Guadalajara, in the Mexican state of Jalisco. The monument is located in a roundabout that was later intervened by activists, who symbolically renamed it as the Glorieta de las y los desaparecidos.
