= Nationalization of oil in Algeria =

This article covers the history of the nationalization of oil in Algeria.

== Origins ==
After Algeria claimed independence from France in July 1962, the economy of the new nation resembled that of an economy that was extremely dependent on a highly developed nation. The agricultural sector, which was the dominant economic arm, was divided into two branches: one that was cash-crop export oriented and therefore very modern, and one that was more traditional with the aim of self-sufficiency. While Algeria discovered oil in Edjeleh and Hassi Messaoud in 1956, large scale oil output did not begin until around 1961 as the development of the industry was largely due to French interest. The Evian Accords of 1962 ended the Algerian War for Independence and established Algerian sovereignty without France losing economic interests in the region. Through the accords, Algeria gained full sovereignty of the Algerian territory and France committed to providing assistance in the economic and social development of the new nation. In return, France would maintain all rights pertaining to exploration, research and transportation in the oil industry. French companies would also have significant privileges over non-French and non-Algerian companies in the Algerian oil industry for a period of six years. France was willing to accept Algeria's independence as long as their status as a newly founded nation would not endanger French access to the oil resources in the Sahara. France believed their rights to the oil were not only based on their historical control of the region but also their significant investments which went into the development of the Sahara oil reserves. The agreement reached at Evian in 1962, however, resulted in insufficient oil revenues for Algeria which could not counteract the economic decline, capital spill over, and increasing government spending that was present in the Ben Bella government.

== Logistical features ==
=== 31 December 1963 ===
Algeria established its own oil company Société Nationale du Transport et de Commercialisation des Hydrocarbures (SONATRACH) whose first task was to build the third crude oil pipeline which was originally keeping Algeria from expanding Saharan production and commercialization. This action, however, was in clear violation of the Evian Accords and led to negotiations which took place in the 1965 Oil and Gas Accord.

=== January 1964 ===
The Algerian government announced that the third pipeline, which would be the first task of Algeria's oil company, would be built without the participation of the other oil companies.

=== September 1964 ===
President Ben Bella expressed that Algeria would like to play a more active role in all aspects of production of oil rather than a marginal role in solely collecting royalties. Ben Bella also stated that he would like to ensure that the companies exploiting the oil resources in the Sahara understand that their operations should be to the benefit of development in Algeria as well. This was all expressed through Algeria's hydrocarbon policy.

=== 29 July 1965 ===
In the Algeria-France Oil and Gas Accord, France would still retain its allowances, but Algeria would receive larger royalties through incremental annual increases in barrel prices. Along with increased revenues, Algeria would also gain more control of the commercialization of natural gas. The Accord also served to establish an Association Coopérative (ASCOOP) which therefore created a partnership between the Algerian state hydrocarbon enterprise, SONATRACH, and a French equivalent for both exploration and exploitation purposes. One of the most important aspects of the 1965 agreement is that it created the industry framework that still exists today, as Algeria was granted a larger proportion of earnings from the industry through both legal justification and a larger role in the operation of the oil industry.

=== 30 August 1967 ===
During the Arab-Israeli War of 1967, the Algerian government placed all American firms under the supervision of the state but there was a distinction drawn between temporary control and nationalization. On August 30, Algeria nationalized five American-run oil companies – ESSO Standard Algerie which focused on transport, ESSO Africa which focused on Marketing, ESSO Saharienne which focused on exploration, MOBIL Oil Nord Africaine which focused on Marketing, and MOBIL Oil France which focused on transport. As of August 30, US companies only held 7% of total production in the oil reserves in the Sahara while French companies held from 75% to 80% of total production.

=== 1969 ===
In 1969, Algeria joined the Organization of Petroleum Exporting Countries of OPEC. Until 1969, Algeria received the least amount of revenue per oil barrel produced of all other major oil producing country in the Middle East and North Africa.

=== 24 February 1971 ===
President Boumediene released an order to nationalize the natural gas deposits and land infrastructure and therefore increase Algeria’s participation in oil production by 51%.

=== 9 March 1971 ===
Prime Minister Jacques Chaban-Delmas of France gave Algerian Ambassador Mohammed Bedjaoui a memorandum which stated that the French government recognized the right of Algeria to nationalize the property of the companies that were operating on Algerian soil within specific Algerian economic sectors, but condemned the actions of Algeria which were contradictory to the “spirit of negotiations” that were present in 1962 and 1965.

=== 15 December 1971 ===
An agreement between Elf-Erap, the French Oil Company, and SONATRACH, the Algerian Oil Company, was reached regarding the nationalization of French oil and gas interests in Algeria. The original compensation of $37 million that Elf-Erap requested was cancelled out by taxes that were owed to the Algeria Treasury. Algeria also claimed $80 million for compensation of low transport rates which would be settled by Elf-Erap through ceding some non-nationalized holdings, The agreement also stated that any other disputes regarding French and Algerian oil companies would be dealt with through the Algerian courts and not by international arbitration. Lastly, the agreement served to set up ElfAlgerie, a new exploratory oil company.

== Current status ==
Currently, Algeria is one of the largest natural gas producers in what is known as the Arab World behind Qatar and Saudi Arabia. Algeria is also the leading gas exporter in Africa with energy supply relationships with France, Spain, Italy, United States and China. The US Energy Information Administration estimates that Algerian crude oil reserves amount to about 12.2 billion barrels but Algeria could potentially double its oil and gas production in the next ten years as the Sahara is a largely unexplored territory. Today, oil revenue accounts for about 20% of Algeria’s gross domestic product and about 85% of the country’s total exports. Algeria still owns SONATRACH which is Africa's largest gas producer and the bulk of Algerian oil still comes from the Hassi Messaoud and the Edjele oil fields which were the two major oil fields in 1956
