= Nationalization of oil supplies =

Confiscation of oil production

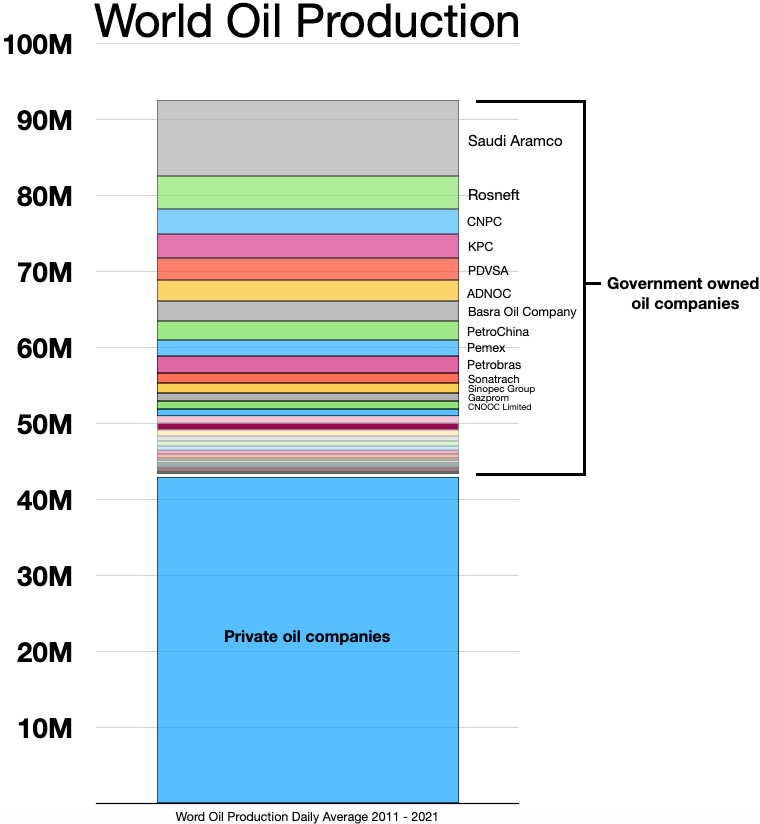
World oil production 2011 - 2021 average barrels of oil per day

The nationalization of oil supplies refers to the process of confiscation of oil production operations and their property, generally for the purpose of obtaining more revenue from oil for the governments of oil-producing countries. This process, which should not be confused with restrictions on crude oil exports, represents a significant turning point in the development of oil policy. Nationalization eliminates private business operations—in which private international companies control oil resources within oil-producing countries—and transfers them to the ownership of the governments of those countries. Once these countries become the sole owners of these resources, they have to decide how to maximize the net present value of their known stock of oil in the ground. Several key implications can be observed as a result of oil nationalization. "On the home front, national oil companies are often torn between national expectations that they should 'carry the flag' and their own ambitions for commercial success, which might mean a degree of emancipation from the confines of a national agenda."

According to consulting firm PFC Energy, only 7% of the world's estimated oil and gas reserves are in countries that allow private international companies free rein. Roughly 65% are in the hands of state-owned companies such as Saudi Aramco, with the rest in countries such as Russia and Venezuela, where access by Western companies is difficult. The PFC study implies political groups unfavorable to capitalism in some countries tend to limit oil production increases in Mexico, Venezuela, Iran, Iraq, Kuwait and Russia. Saudi Arabia is also limiting capacity expansion, but because of a self-imposed cap, unlike the other countries.

== History ==
This nationalization (expropriation) of previously privately owned oil supplies where it has occurred, has been a gradual process. Before the discovery of oil, some Middle Eastern countries such as Iraq, Saudi Arabia, and Kuwait were all poor and underdeveloped. They were desert kingdoms that had few natural resources and were without adequate financial resources to maintain the state. Poor peasants made up a majority of the population.

Kuwaiti historian Muhammad Rumaihi states, “The Gulf is not oil. The Gulf is its people and its land. So it was before the discovery of oil, and so it will remain when the oil disappears. Oil is no more than a historical phase in this part of the Arab world, and a rather short one at that.”

At the end of the XIX century, Great Britain didn’t have access firsthand to the oil, and they depended on the USA, Russia or Mexico for itheirsupplies. Through the geologist and engineer William D’Arcy, Great Britain could secure oil rights of inspection in the lands of the Persian Shah Muzaffar al-Din.

In 1901 D’Arcy obtained a concession of 500,000 square miles (almost 85% of modern-day Iran) for 60 years. It gave him the exclusive right of exploiting the oil for a payment to the government of 20,000 pounds sterling, 20,000 pounds in stocks and 16% of the earnings. In collaboration with the English Government, D’Arcy established the Anglo-Persian Oil Company (that later became Anglo-Iranian Oil, and then British Petroleum). In that time the procedure to continue in the countries where the deposit of oil were discovered, consisted in that a delegation interviewed with the king or shah who in general ignored what it was or for what reason the oil did serve, and then by means of a payment, usually in currencies of gold or silver or a small percentage was gotten the concession. These concessions were a permission to extract, to treat and to transport the crude.

After World War II, AIOC (Anglo-Iranian Oil Company) and the Iranian government initially resisted nationalist pressure to revise AIOC’s concession terms still further in Iran’s favour. In 1951, the pro-western Prime Minister Ali Razmara was assassinated. The Iranian Parliament elected a nationalist, Mohammed Mossadeq, as Prime Minister. Months later, the parliament nationalized the oil industry and the Shah, Mohammad Pahlevi is pushed to the exile. The British government decided that the only way to regain its control of Iranian oil was to remove Mossadeq from office. For it, with the support of United States, they overthrew the Iranian government. The CIA and MI6 (Agency of external Intelligence of the United Kingdom) conspiracy became known by its codename operation Ajax.

On August 19, 1953, Mossadeq was forced to leave office through a military coup. He was replaced by pro-Western general Fazlollah Zahedi. So, the AIOC became The British Petroleum Company in 1954, and resumed operations in Iran. However, it was not allowed to monopolise Iranian oil as before. It was limited to a new international consortium. On the other hand, the Shah Mohammad Reza Pahlevi recovered the throne and he becomes one of the big western allies in the region, he rules with iron hand supported by the United States military help and by a powerful police, the SAVAK. He suppresses the political parties and a politics of modernization of the country undertakes; he also undertakes agricultural reforms, nationalizes natural resources and extends the vote to the women. He also leans towards the laicism and towards the recognition of Israel.

Major oil companies had the technology and expertise and they negotiated concession agreements with the developing countries; the companies were given exclusive rights to explore and develop the production of oil within the country in exchange for making risky investments, discovering the oil deposits, producing the oil, and paying local taxes. The concession agreements made between the oil-producing country and the oil company specified a limited area the company could utilize, lasted a limited amount of time, and required the company to take all the financial and commercial risks as well as pay the host governments surface taxes, royalties, and production taxes. As long as companies met those requirements, governments promised the companies would be able to claim any of the oil they mined. As a result, the world's oil was largely in the hands of seven corporations based in the United States and Europe, often called the Seven Sisters. Five of the companies were American (Chevron, Exxon, Gulf, Mobil, and Texaco), one was British (BP), and one was Anglo-Dutch (Royal Dutch Shell). These companies have since merged into four: Shell, ExxonMobil, Chevron, and BP. The nations with oil reserves were unhappy with the percentage of the profits they had negotiated. But, due to the inclusion of choice-of-law clauses, the sovereign host countries could not simply change the contracts arbitrarily. In other words, disputes over contract details would be settled by a third party instead of the host country. The only way for host countries to alter their contracts was through nationalization (expropriation).

Although undeveloped nations originally welcomed concession agreements, some nationalists began to argue that the oil companies were exploiting them. Led by Venezuela, oil-producing countries realized that they could control the price of oil by limiting the supply. The countries joined together as OPEC and gradually governments took control of oil supplies.

Before the 1970s there were only two major incidents of successful oil nationalization—the first following the Bolshevik Revolution of 1917 in Russia and the second in 1938 in Mexico.

=== Pre-nationalization ===
Due to the presence of oil, the Middle East has been the center of international tension even before the nationalization of oil supplies. Britain was the first country that took interest in Middle Eastern oil. In 1908, oil was discovered in Persia by the Anglo-Persian oil company under the stimulus of the British government. Britain maintained strategic and military domination of areas of the Middle East outside Turkish control until after World War I when the former Turkish Empire was divided between the British and the French. It turned out that many of the areas controlled by the French had little oil potential.

On the other hand, Britain continued to expand oil interests into other parts of the Persian Gulf. Although oil resources were found in Kuwait, there was not enough demand for oil at the time to develop in this area.

Due to political and commercial pressure, it did not take long before the United States secured an entry into Middle Eastern oil supplies. The British government was forced to allow the US into Iraq and the Persian Gulf states. Iraq became dominated by US oil companies while Kuwait consisted of a 50/50 split between British and American companies.

Up until 1939, Middle Eastern oil remained relatively unimportant in world markets. According to “The Significance of Oil,” the Middle East at the time “was contributing only 5 percent of total world oil production and its exports were limited to countries within the immediate region and, via the Suez Canal, in western Europe.” The real significance of pre-1939 developments in the Middle East is that they established the framework for the post-1945 oil expansion.

After World War II, the demand for oil increased significantly. Due to war-time oil development, which proved the great potential for oil discovery in the Middle East, there was little hesitation in investing capital in Iran, Iraq, Kuwait and Saudi Arabia.

Huge investments were made to improve the infrastructure needed to transport Middle Eastern oil. For example, investment was made on the Suez Canal to ensure that larger tankers could utilize it. There was also an increased construction of oil pipelines. The expansion of infrastructure to produce and transport Middle East oil was mainly under the operation of the seven major international oil companies.

=== Early nationalizations ===
Prior to 1970, there were ten countries that nationalized oil production: the Soviet Union in 1918, Bolivia in 1937 and 1969, Mexico in 1938, Iran in 1951, Iraq in 1961, Burma and Egypt in 1962, Argentina in 1963, Indonesia in 1963, and Peru in 1968. Although these countries were nationalized by 1971, all of the “important” industries that existed in developing countries were still held by foreign firms. In addition, only Mexico and Iran were significant exporters at the time of nationalization.

The government of Brazil, under Getúlio Vargas, nationalized the oil industry in 1953, thereby creating Petrobras.

== Reasons for nationalization ==
=== Exploitation ===
Proponents of nationalization asserted that the original contracts held between an oil-producing country and an oil company were unfair to the producing country. Yet without the knowledge and skill brought into the country by the international oil companies, the countries would not have been able to get the oil. Contracts, which could not be altered or ended in advance of the true end date, covered huge expanses of land and lasted for long durations. Nationalist ideas began once producing countries realized that the oil companies were exploiting them. Many times these countries did not pay the companies for their loss of assets or only paid nominal amounts.

The first country to act was Venezuela, which had the most favorable concession agreement. In 1943, the country increased the total royalties and tax paid by the companies to 50% of their total profits. However, true equal profit sharing was not accomplished until 1948. Because oil companies were able to deduct the tax from their income tax, profits acquired by the oil companies did not change significantly and, as a result, the oil companies did not have any major problems with the change imposed by Venezuela. Even with increased oil prices, the companies still held a dominant position over Venezuela.

=== Change in oil prices ===
The posted price of oil was originally the determinant factor of the taxes that oil companies had to pay. This concept was beneficial to the oil companies because they were the ones who controlled the posted prices. Companies could increase the actual price of oil without changing the posted price, thus avoiding an increase in taxes paid to the producing country. Oil-producing countries did not realize that the companies were adjusting oil prices until the cost of oil dropped in the late 1950s and companies started reducing posted prices very frequently. The main reason for the reduction in oil prices was the change in the world's energy situation after 1957 that led to competition between energy sources. Efforts to find markets led to price cuts. Price cutting was first achieved by shaving profit margins, but soon prices were reduced to levels far lower than posted prices as companies producing oil in the Middle East started to offer crude to independent and state-owned refineries.

Producing countries became aggravated when the companies would reduce the prices without warning. According to “The Significance of Oil,”

“small reductions in posted prices in 1958 and 1959 produced some indications of disapproval from certain Middle East governments, but it was not until major cuts—of the order of 10 to 15 percent—were announced in 1960 that a storm broke over the heads of the companies whose decisions would reduce the oil revenues of the countries by 5 to 7 ½ percent.”

High oil prices, on the other hand, raise the bargaining power of oil-producing countries. As a result, some say that countries are more likely to nationalize their oil supplies during times of high oil prices. However, nationalization can come with various costs and it is often questioned why a government would respond to an oil price increase with nationalization rather than by imposing higher taxes. Contract theory provides reasoning against nationalization.

=== Structural change of oil-producing countries ===
The Third World went through dramatic structural change in the decades after oil was first discovered. Rising nationalism and the emergence of shared group consciousness among developing countries accompanied the end of the formal colonial relationships in the 1950s and 1960s. Shared group consciousness among the oil-exporting countries was expressed through the formation of OPEC, increased contact and communication between countries, and attempts of common action among countries during the 1960s. The structure of the industry, which led to increased nationalistic mentality, was affected by the following important changes:

==== Strategic control ====
Originally, oil-producing countries were poor and needed oil companies to help them produce the oil and manage the oil reserves located within the country. However, as the countries began to develop, their demands for revenue increased. The industry became integrated into a local economy that required strategic control by the host country over pricing and the rate of production. Gradually, foreign investors lost the trust of oil-producing countries to develop resources in the national interest. Oil-producing countries demanded participation in the control of the oil within their country.

==== Increased capabilities ====
Furthermore, technological innovation and managerial expertise increased dramatically after World War II, which increased the bargaining power of producing countries. Increased bargaining power allowed the companies to change their mode of operation.

==== Expansion of the oil industry ====
Stephen J. Kobrin states that

“During the interwar period and through the 1950s, international petroleum was a very tight oligopoly dominated by seven major international oil companies (Exxon, Shell, BP, Gulf, Texaco, Mobil and Chevron—as they are known today). However, between 1953 and 1972 more than three hundred private firms and fifty state-owned firms entered the industry, drawn by the explosion in oil consumption and substantially diminished barriers to entry.”

The new, independent companies disturbed the equilibrium between the major companies and the producing countries. Countries became aware of their options as these companies offered better agreement terms.

==== Changes in supply and demand ====
The shortage of oil in the 1970s increased the value of oil from previous decades. The bargaining power of producing countries increased as both the country governments and the oil companies became increasingly concerned about the continued access to crude oil.

=== Diffusion of ideas between oil-producing countries ===
Rogers defines diffusion as, “the process by which (1) an innovation (2) is communicated through certain channels (3) over time (4) among members of a social system.” Innovations may consist of technology, philosophy, or managerial techniques. Examples of communication channels include the mass media, organizations such as OPEC or the U.N., or educational institutions. Due to diffusion, attempts at oil nationalization from producing countries, and whether or not these attempts were successful, affected decisions to nationalize oil supplies.

Two attempts of nationalization that had clear inhibiting effects on other producing countries were the nationalizations of Mexico in 1938 and of Iran in 1951, which occurred prior to the important structural change in the oil industry. The Mexican nationalization proved that although it was possible to accomplish nationalization, it came at the cost of isolation from the international industry, which was dominated by the major companies at the time. The Iranian nationalization also failed due to the lack of cooperation with international oil companies. These two incidences proved to other oil-producing countries that, until the structure of the oil industry changed to rely less upon international oil companies, any attempts to nationalize would be a great risk and would likely be unsuccessful.

Once the oil industry structure changed, oil-producing countries were more likely to succeed in nationalizing their oil supplies. The development of OPEC provided the medium in which producing countries could communicate and diffusion could occur rapidly.

The first country to successfully nationalize after the structural change of the industry was Algeria, which nationalized 51% of the French companies only ten days after the 1971 Tehran agreement and later was able to nationalize 100% of their companies. The nationalization of Algerian oil influenced Libya to nationalize British Petroleum in 1971 and the rest of its foreign companies by 1974. A ripple effect quickly occurred, spreading first to the more-militant oil producers like Iraq and then followed by more-conservative oil producers like Saudi Arabia. Stephen J. Kobrin states that

“By 1976 virtually every other major producer in the mid-East, Africa, Asia, and Latin America had followed nationalizing at least some of its producers to gain either a share of participation or to take over the entire industry and employ the international companies on a contractual basis.”

== Implications of nationalization ==
=== Vertical integration of the oil industry was broken ===
Due to the overall instability of supply, oil became an instrument of foreign policy for oil-exporting countries. Nationalization increased the stability in the oil markets and broke the vertical integration within the system. Vertical integration was replaced with a dual system where OPEC countries controlled upstream activities such as the production and marketing of crude oil while oil companies controlled downstream activities such as transportation, refining, distribution, and sale of oil products.

Under the new dual structure, OPEC was neither vertically or horizontally integrated and was not able to take over the entire oil sector from the oil companies. The temporary fear of an oil shortage during the 1970s helped to hide this consequence. In addition, relations between producing countries of the Persian Gulf and previous concessionary companies induced an “artificial” vertical integration. These relations included long-term contracts, discount of official prices, and phase-out clauses. Free markets started to become prevalent in 1981 after the trade in oil switched from being a sellers’ to a buyers’ market.

=== Oil companies lost access to oil supplies ===
According to the Energy Studies Review the western world oil demand decreased 15% between the years 1973 and 1982. In the same time period the major oil companies went from a production in the crude oil market of 30 to 15.2 million barrels (4.8 to 2.4 million cubic metres), a decrease of nearly 50%. In this period, the production from reserves under their own control went from 25.5 to 6.7 million bbl (4.1 to 1.1 million m^{3}), a decrease of 74%. As a result, important oil companies became important net buyers of crude oil after a long time of being vertically integrated sellers to their own refineries.

=== Change in the horizontal integration of the oil industry ===
The increase in oil prices of the 70s attracted non-OPEC producers—Norway, Mexico, Great Britain, Egypt, and some African and Asian countries—to explore within their country. In 1965, the Herfindahl index of horizontal integration for the crude oil production industry was 1600 and the horizontal integration for the exploration industry was 1250. By 1986, it decreased to around 930 for the crude oil production industry and 600 for the exploration industry. This created a further destabilizing factor for OPEC.

=== Restructuring of the refining sector ===
The world refining capacity of the major oil companies in 1973 was 23.2 million barrels (3.69 million cubic metres) per day. However, by 1982, their world refining capacity had decreased to 14 million bbl (2.2 million m^{3}) per day. This decrease was a result of their decreased access to the oil reserves of OPEC countries and, subsequently, the rationalization of their world refining and distribution network to decrease their dependence on OPEC countries. The increase in the refining capacity of OPEC countries that wanted to sell not only crude oil but also refined products further reinforced this trend towards rationalization.

=== Change in the spot market ===
The nationalization of oil supplies and the emergence of the OPEC market caused the spot market to change in both orientation and size. The spot market changed in orientation because it started to deal not only with crude oil but also with refined products. The spot market changed in size because as the OPEC market declined the number of spot market transactions increased. The development of the spot market made oil prices volatile. The risks involving oil investment increased. To protect against these potential risks, parallel markets such as the forward market developed. As these new markets developed, price control became more difficult for OPEC. In addition, oil was transformed from a strategic product to a commodity. Changes in the spot market favored competition and made it more difficult for oligopolistic agreements. The development of many free markets impacted OPEC in two different ways:

1. A destabilizing effect occurred that made it easier for OPEC members not to respect their own quota if they did not want to.
2. A stabilizing effect occurred that provided an incentive for cooperation among OPEC members. Decreased prices due to free markets made it more profitable for OPEC countries to work together rather than to seek profit individually.

== OPEC countries ==
=== Algeria ===
Currently, Algeria is one of the largest natural gas producers in what is known as the Arab World behind Qatar and Saudi Arabia. Algeria's nationalization of oil and gas came a mere nine years after the nation declared independence from colonial France which had ruled over the region for 130 years. Algeria joined OPEC in 1969 and fully nationalized its industry in 1971, but Algeria was taking steps to play a larger role in the oil industry profiting from their reserves in the Sahara in 1963.

=== Ecuador ===
Ecuador has had one of the most volatile oil policies in the region, partly a reflection of the high political volatility in the country. Petroecuador accounts for over half of oil production, however, as a result of financial setbacks combined with a drop in oil price, private companies increased oil investments in Ecuador. In the early 1990s annual foreign investment in oil was below US$200 million, by the early 2000s it had surpassed US$1 billion (Campodónico, 2004). Changes in political power led to an increase in government control over oil extraction. In particular, the election of President Rafael Correa, on a resource-nationalism platform, prompted increases in government control and the approval of a windfall profits tax.

=== Iran ===
Since its beginning, Iran's oil industry has experienced expansion and contraction. Rapid growth at the time of World War I declined soon after the start of World War II. Recovery began in 1943 with the reopening of supply routes to the United Kingdom. The oil was produced by what became the Anglo-Iranian Oil Company, but political difficulties arose with the Iranian government in the postwar period.

Iran sought to rid itself of British political influence and the exploitation by AIOC. Negotiations between Anglo-Iranian Oil Company and the government failed and in 1951 the oil industry was nationalized. As a result of Britain's boycott and the Abadan Crisis, Iranian production dropped to virtually zero. On British initiative the CIA overthrew Prime Minister of Iran Mosaddegh in Operation Ajax. Formally the nationalization remained effective, but in practice a consortium of oil companies was allowed in under a by then standard 50/50 profit-sharing deal.

The whole process had left the British a major share in what had been their single most valuable foreign asset. It had stopped the democratic transition in Iran however, leaving its mark for decades to come. The coup is widely believed to have significantly contributed to the 1979 Iranian Revolution after which the oil industry would be nationalized again.

=== Iraq ===
The properties of the majors were nationalized totally in Iraq, in 1972. Worldwide oil shortages in the 1970s forced major oil suppliers to look elsewhere for ways to acquire the resource. Under these circumstances, NOCs often came forward as alternative suppliers of oil. Nationalization of the Iraq Petroleum Company (IPC) in 1972 after years of rancor, together with restrictions on oil liftings by all but one of the IPC's former partners, put Iraq at the forefront of direct marketing. Iraq's oil production suffered major damage in the aftermath of the Gulf War. In spite of United Nations sanctions, Iraq has been rebuilding war-damaged oil facilities and export terminals. Iraq plans to increase its oil productive capacity to 4 million barrels (640 thousand cubic metres) per day in 2000 and 6 million bbl (950 thousand m^{3}) per day in 2010.

=== Libya ===
Libya, in particular, sought out independent oil firms to develop its oilfields; in 1970, the Libyan government used its leverage to restructure radically the terms of its agreements with these independent companies, precipitating a rash of contract renegotiations throughout the oil-exporting world.

=== Nigeria ===
The discovery of oil in Nigeria caused conflict within the state. The emergence of commercial oil production from the region in 1958 and thereafter raised the stakes and generated a struggle by the indigenes for control of the oil resources. The northern hegemony, ruled by Hausa and Fulani, took a military dictatorship and seized control of oil production. To meet popular demands for cheaper food during the inflationary period just after the civil war, government created a new state corporation, the National Nigerian Supply Company (NNSC). While oil production proceeded, the region by the 1990s was one of the least developed and most poor. The local communities responded with protests and successful efforts to stop oil production in the area if they did not receive any benefit. By September 1999, about 50 Shell workers had been kidnapped and released. Not only are the people of Nigeria affected, but the environment in the area is also affected by deforestation and improper waste treatment. Nigerian oil production also faces problems with illegal trade of the refined product on the black market. This is undertaken by authorized marketers in collusion with smuggling syndicates. Activities such as these severely affect the oil industries of both the state and MNCs. Oil production deferments arising from community disturbances and sabotage was 45mm barrels in 2000 and 35mm barrels in 2001. The state has not been a very effective means of controlling incursions such as these. The illegal oil economy in such a circumstance may continue to exist for a long time, albeit in curtailed and small scales.

=== Saudi Arabia ===
By 1950, Saudi Arabia had become a very successful producing area, with an even greater undeveloped oil production potential. Because of favorable geological conditions and the close proximity of oil fields to the coast, Saudi Arabia operations were low cost. American companies therefore heavily valued the oil. The joint concessionary company, ARAMCO, agreed to the government's demand to use the introduced posted price as a way to calculate profits. Profit-sharing between ARAMCO and Saudi Arabia was established as a 50/50 split. Eventually the Saudi government fully purchased Aramco in 1980 renaming it as Saudi Aramco.

=== Venezuela ===
In 1938, Venezuelan President Eleazar López Contreras enacted a new Hydrocarbons Law, which established the increase of royalties, as well as the increase of exploration and exploitation taxes. The Venezuelan government was also authorized to create companies or institutes for the development of the oil activity. On 13 March 1943, President Isaías Medina Angarita promulgated another Hydrocarbons Law, which established that from then on at least 10% of the crude oil had to be refined in Venezuela; the royalty or exploitation tax could not be less than 16.7%; the Venezuelan State received a 50% profit from oil exploitation and 12% of the income tax. New taxes were also established to prevent companies from maintaining idle fields. While the world was in the midst of World War II, Venezuela increased its oil production to supply the Allies with fuel; much of the oil was refined in the Caribbean islands. Medina's government was overthrown by a coup on 18 October 1945; an interim government was installed, which later gave way in 1948 to another democratically elected government presided by Rómulo Gallegos, during which the oil policy of "no more concessions" was promoted, which was also authored by the then Minister of Development of those two periods, Juan Pablo Pérez Alfonzo. Implementing a 50%-50% or fifty-fifty readjustment in 1948. Gallegos' government was in turn deposed by a military coup d'état later that year on 24 November. Another coup in 1958 brought an end to the military dictatorship in the country. The newly elected Minister of Mines and Hydrocarbons, Juan Pablo Pérez Alfonzo, acted to raise the income tax on oil companies and introduced the key aspect of supply and demand to the oil trade.

On 29 August 1975, during the tenure of President Carlos Andrés Pérez, "Law that Reserves the Hydrocarbon Industry to the State" was enacted and the state-owned company Petróleos de Venezuela (PDVSA) was created to control all oil businesses in the Venezuelan territory. The law came into effect on 1 January 1976, as well as the nationalization of the oil industry with it, after which PDVSA began commercial operations.

== Non-OPEC countries ==
=== Argentina ===
Nationalization of oil resources in Argentina began in 1907, when upon the discovery of the nation's first sizable oil field near Comodoro Rivadavia, President José Figueroa Alcorta declared the area around the oil field public property. YPF, the first oil company in the world established as a state enterprise, was established by President Hipólito Yrigoyen and General Enrique Mosconi in 1922. The nation's mineral resources were nationalized in toto with Article 40 of the Argentine Constitution of 1949 promulgated by President Juan Perón. The latter was abrogated in 1956, but oil and natural gas were renationalized in 1958 during President Arturo Frondizi's self-described "oil battle" for self-sufficiency in the staple, and private firms operated afterward via leases. YPF was privatized in 1993, and Madrid-based Repsol acquired a majority stake in 1999. Oil and gas production subsequently weakened while demand increased, and in 2011 Argentina recorded the first energy trade deficit since 1987.

In April 2010, Argentina's president Cristina Fernández de Kirchner introduced a bill on April 16, 2012, for the expropriation of YPF, the nation's largest energy firm. The state would purchase a 51% share, with the national government controlling 51% of this package and ten provincial governments receiving the remaining 49%.

Investment in exploration at YPF as a percentage of profits had been far below those in most other Repsol subsidiaries, and declines in output at the firm represented 54% of the nation's lost oil production and 97% in the case of natural gas. Market analysts and Repsol blamed the decline in exploration and production on government controls on exports and prospecting leases, as well as price controls on domestic oil and gas. YPF increased its estimates of oil reserves in Argentina in 2012, but warned that government policies would have to change to allow investment in new production. The government announced instead that it would acquire a majority stake in YPF. Argentine Economy Minister Hernán Lorenzino claimed that asset stripping at YPF had financed Repsol's expansion in other parts of the world, while Repsol officials denied charges of underinvestment in its YPF operations.

Argentine Deputy Economy Minister Axel Kicillof rejected Repsol's initial demands for payment of US$10.5 billion for a controlling stake in YPF, citing debts of nearly US$9 billion. The book value of YPF was US$4.4 billion at the end of 2011; its total market capitalization on the day of the announcement was US$10.4 billion. The bill was overwhelmingly approved by both houses of Congress, and was signed by the president on May 5.

The government of Argentina eventually agreed to pay $ billion compensation to Repsol, which had previously owned YPF.

=== Canada ===
In 2010, Canada was the United States' leading oil supplier, exporting some 707,316,000 barrels (112,454,300 m^{3}) of oil per year (1,937,852 barrels per day (308,093.8 m^{3}/d)), 99 percent of its annual oil exports, according to the EIA. Following the OPEC oil embargo in the early 1970s, Canada took initiative to control its oil supplies. The result of these initiatives was Petro-Canada, a state-owned oil company. Petro-Canada put forth national goals including, increased domestic ownership of the industry, development of reserves not located in the western provinces, that is to say, the promotion of the Canada Lands in the north and offshore, better information about the petroleum industry, security of supply, decrease dependence on the large multinational oil corporations, especially the Big Four, and increase revenues flowing to the federal treasury from the oil and gas sector. Petro-Canada was founded in 1975 as a federally owned crown corporation, then privatized beginning in 1991. The provincial government of Ontario purchased a 25% stake in Suncor Energy in 1981, then divested it in 1993.

Petro-Canada has been met with opposition mainly from Alberta, home to one of the main oil patches in Canada. After negotiating a royalty increase on oil and price increases for natural gas, Lougheed asserted Alberta's position as the centre of Canada's petroleum industry. Alberta had since been the main source of oil in Canada since the 1970s. The clashing viewpoints of resource control has resulted in conflict over the direction of Canada's oil industry, and as a result, the vast majority of Canada's oil ownership and profits continue to lay in foreign hands.

=== Mexico ===
Mexico nationalized its oil industry in 1938, and has never privatized, restricting foreign investment. Important reserve additions in the 1970s allowed a significant increase in production and exports, financed by the high oil prices. Despite producing more oil than any other country in Latin America, oil does not carry a relevant proportion of Mexico's exports. Since the giant Cantarell Field in Mexico is now in decline, the state oil company Pemex has faced intense political opposition to opening up the country's oil and gas sector to foreign participation. The lack of financial autonomy has limited Pemex's own investment capacity, inducing the company to become highly indebted and to use an out of budget mechanism of deferred payment of projects (PIDIREGAS) to finance the expansion of production. Some feel that the state oil company Pemex does not have the capacity to develop deep water assets by itself, but needs to do so if it is to stem the decline in the country's crude production.

=== Russia ===
Since Putin assumed the Russian Presidency in January 2000, there has been what amounts to a creeping re-nationalization of the Russian oil industry. In Russia, Vladimir Putin's government has pressured Royal Dutch Shell to hand over control of one major project on Sakhalin Island, to the publicly traded company Gazprom in December. The founder of formerly private Yukos has also been jailed, and the company absorbed by state-owned Rosneft. Such moves strain the confidence of international oil companies in forming partnerships with Russia. Russia has taken notice of their increasing foreign oil investment improving politics with other countries, especially former states of the Soviet Union. The oil industry in Russia is one of the top producers in the world, but with smaller proven reserves. With the breakup of the USSR, Russia has lost access to the rich Caspian Basin off-shore and on-shore oil fields in the Central Asian states and Azerbaijan.

== See also ==
- Economic nationalism
- Energy security
- Energy security and renewable technology
- Peak oil
- United States energy independence
