= Football in Northern Cyprus =

Football is the national sport of Northern Cyprus. It is governed by the Cyprus Turkish Football Federation (Turkish: Kıbrıs Türk Futbol Federasyonu, KTFF), which was set up in 1955. The KTFF oversees the national team and the league system. The top-level national league is the KTFF Süper Lig, followed by the KTFF 1. Lig and the KTFF 2. Lig. The national cup, regulated by the KTFF is the Cypriot Cup. The winner of the league and the cup play the KTFF Super Cup.

Due to the international sports embargo against Northern Cyprus, Turkish Cypriot teams cannot play international matches.

== History ==
Football was introduced to Cyprus on 1878 with the arrival of British troops. There are 2,500 licensed players in Northern Cyprus. The national team is currently ranked number one in the NF-Board standings, and is ranked higher than all non-FIFA teams in the World Football Elo Ratings.

In the first years after the Turkish invasion in 1974, Turkish Cypriot football teams were able to play international matches against teams from countries such as Turkey, Saudi Arabia, Malaysia, Libya. This was due to the tolerance shown by FIFA upon the initiative of its secretary-general, Helmut Käser. However, after the illegal declaration of independence in 1983, Turkish Cypriot teams and the unofficial national team lost the ability to play international matches. A Turkish team, Fenerbahçe SK, had a camp in Northern Cyprus in 1990 and planned to play with a local team, but the match was not allowed by FIFA that recognises Cyprus Football Association to be the only internationally recognised authority for football in Cyprus. In the ELF Cup that took place in Northern Cyprus in 2006, FIFA successfully pressured the Afghanistan national team not to play in the tournament, and FIFA members Kyrgyzstan and Tajikistan sent their futsal teams instead. A Turkish Cypriot bid to join FIFA was rejected again in 2004, after the Annan Plan referendums. In 2007, a friendly football match between Çetinkaya Türk S.K. and Luton Town F.C. was cancelled after pressure by the Republic of Cyprus. In 2014, the Cyprus Turkish Football Federation, after agreement signed between the two, applied to join the Cyprus Football Association, but the talks reached a deadlock because of Turkey's political intervention.

== Women's football ==
Women's football remains very undeveloped in Northern Cyprus. The first ever women's football league in Northern Cyprus, the KTFF Women's League, was established in the 2007-08 season with seven teams. The number of teams later increased to nine. However, the lack of teams and interest, as well as violence in matches resulted in the cancellation of the league by the federation. Only Akdeniz Nurçelik SK, the women's branch of Akdeniz Spor Birliği remained professionally active in this field. The team was, as of the 2014–15 season, in the Turkish Women's Third Football League.

== Football stadiums in Northern Cyprus ==
| Stadium | Capacity | City | Image |
|---|---|---|---|
| Nicosia Atatürk Stadium | 15,000 | North Nicosia | |

== Most successful clubs overall ==
As of 24 May 2026

local and lower league organizations are not included.

| Club | Domestic Titles | | | | | | | | | |
| Club | KTFF Süper Lig | CFA Cypriot First Division | KTFF Cypriot Cup | CFA Cypriot Cup | KTFF Super Cup | CFA Super Cup | Başbakanlık Kupası | Dr. Fazıl Küçük Kupası | Spor Bakanlığı Kupası | Total |
|---|---|---|---|---|---|---|---|---|---|---|
| Çetinkaya | **14** | **1** | **17** | **2** | **9** | **3** | - | **5** | - | **51** |
| Mağusa Türk Gücü | 14 | - | 7 | - | 7 | - | - | - | 1 | 29 |
| Gönyeli | 9 | - | 8 | - | 4 | - | **4** | 3 | - | 28 |
| Yenicami | 9 | - | 8 | - | 5 | - | 1 | - | 1 | 24 |
| Küçük Kaymaklı | 4 | - | 7 | - | 1 | - | 2 | 2 | - | 16 |
| Doğan Türk Birliği | 7 | - | 2 | - | - | - | 3 | 1 | - | 13 |
| Baf Ülkü Yurdu | 4 | - | - | - | 3 | - | 1 | 2 | 1 | 11 |
| Türk Ocağı Limasol | - | - | 6 | - | 4 | - | - | - | 1 | 11 |
| Gençlik Gücü | 1 | - | 2 | - | 1 | - | - | - | **2** | 6 |
| Lefke | - | - | 3 | - | - | - | - | - | **2** | 5 |
| Akıncılar | 1 | - | - | - | - | - | 2 | - | 1 | 4 |
| Binatlı | 1 | - | 1 | - | - | - | 1 | - | - | 3 |
| Yalova | - | - | 1 | - | 1 | - | 1 | - | - | 3 |
| Gençler Birliği | - | - | - | - | - | - | 1 | - | 1 | 2 |
| Cihangir | - | - | 1 | - | - | - | - | - | - | 1 |
| Göçmenköy | - | - | 1 | - | - | - | - | - | - | 1 |
| Ağırdağ Boğaz | - | - | - | - | - | - | 1 | - | - | 1 |
| Alsancak Yeşilova | - | - | - | - | - | - | 1 | - | - | 1 |
| Ortaköy | - | - | - | - | - | - | 1 | - | - | 1 |
| Pile | - | - | - | - | - | - | 1 | - | - | 1 |
| Beyarmudu | - | - | - | - | - | - | - | - | 1 | 1 |
| Esentepe | - | - | - | - | - | - | - | - | 1 | 1 |
| Hamitköy | - | - | - | - | - | - | - | - | 1 | 1 |

- The articles in italic indicate the defunct leagues and the defunct cups.
- The figures in **bold** indicate the most times this competition has been won by a team.

== See also ==
- Lists of stadiums
