= 2021–22 KTFF Süper Lig =

Süper Lig
- Season: 2021–22
- Dates: 16 September 2021 – 14 May 2022
- Champions: Mağusa Türk Gücü; 11th title
- Top goalscorer: (Northern Cyprus) Remzi Betmezoğlu (25 goals)

The 2021–22 KTFF Süper Lig season was the 60th season of the Süper Lig in Northern Cyprus. Mağusa Türk Gücü were the reigning champions, winning their third successive title.

This was the first league after the COVID-19 pandemic that forced to cancel the 2020–21 season.

== Format ==
The 2021–22 season was set to continue with the same format used the previous season. The two last teams were directly relegated to the 1. Lig, while qualified teams between the 11th and the 14th position played a relegation stage where the last qualified was also relegated.

== Teams ==
Location of 2019–20 KTFF Süper Lig teams in Northern Cyprus

A total of sixteen teams contest the league, including thirteen sides from the 2019–20 season and three promoted from the 2019–20 KTFF 1. Lig. This includes the two top teams from the 1. Lig, and the winners of the promotion play-offs.

Promoted from 2019–20 1. Lig	Relegated from 2019–20 Süper Lig
Mesarya; Dumlupınar; Girne Halk Evi	Düzkaya; Çetinkaya; Gençlik Gücü

=== Stadiums and locations ===
Team	District	Stadium
Alsancak Yeşilova	Girne	Alsancak Mustafa Hidayet Çağlar Stadium
Cihangir	Lefkoşa	Cihangir Stadium
Çetinkaya	Lefkoşa	Lefkoşa Atatürk Stadium
Değirmenlik	Lefkoşa	Değirmenlik Sadık Cemil Stadium
Doğan Türk Birliği	Girne	Girne 20 Temmuz Mete Adanır Stadium
Dumlupınar	Gazimağusa	Dr. Fazıl Küçük Stadium
Gençlik Gücü	Lefkoşa	Lefkoşa Atatürk Stadium
Göçmenkoy	Lefkoşa	Göçmenköy Stadium
Gönyeli	Lefkoşa	Ali Naci Karacan Stadium
Hamitköy	Lefkoşa	Hamitköy Stadium
Küçük Kaymaklı	Lefkoşa	Lefkoşa Şehit Hüseyin Ruso Stadium
Lefke	Lefke	August 16 Victory Stadium
Mağusa Türk Gücü	Gazimağusa	Gazimağusa Canbulat Stadium
Mesarya	Gazimağusa	Paşaköy Hasan Onalt Stadium
Türk Ocağı Limasol	Girne	Girne 20 Temmuz Mete Adanır Stadium
Yenicami Ağdelen	Lefkoşa	Lefkoşa Atatürk Stadium

== League table ==
Pos	Team	Pld	W	D	L	GF	GA	GD	Pts	Qualification or relegation
1	Mağusa Türk Gücü (C)	30	22	3	5	80	32	+48	69	
2	Alsancak Yeşilova	30	14	9	7	58	43	+15	51 (Note: Alsancak Yeşilova finished ahead of Doğan Türk Birliği on head-to-head points: Alsancak Yeşilova, 6 points; Doğan Türk Birliği, 0 points.)	
3	Doğan Türk Birliği	30	14	9	7	50	38	+12	51	
4	Yenicami Ağdelen	30	14	8	8	72	40	+32	50 (Note: Yenicami finished ahead of Lefke and Gönyeli on head-to-head points: Yenicami, 8 points; Lefke, 4 points; Gönyeli, 2 points.)	
5	Lefke	30	13	11	6	41	31	+10	50	
6	Gönyeli	30	14	8	8	45	35	+10	50	
7	Mesarya	30	15	4	11	43	25	+18	49	
8	Cihangir	30	13	9	8	55	46	+9	48	
9	Dumlupınar	30	14	6	10	53	33	+20	48 (Note: Dumlupınar finished ahead of Küçük Kaymaklı on head-to-head points: Dumlupınar, 4 points; Küçük Kaymaklı, 1 point.)	
10	Küçük Kaymaklı	30	10	12	8	41	34	+7	42	
11	Göçmenköy (O)	30	11	6	13	36	44	−8	39 (Note: Göçmenköy finished ahead of Türk Ocağı Limasol on overall goal difference: Göçmenköy, –8; Türk Ocağı Limasol, –10.)	Qualification for the relegation stage
12	Türk Ocağı Limasol (O)	30	11	6	13	36	46	−10	39	Qualification for the relegation stage
13	Hamitköy (O)	30	10	5	15	44	51	−7	35	Qualification for the relegation stage
14	Baf Ülkü Yurdu (R)	30	5	7	18	19	58	−39	22	Qualification for the relegation stage
15	Binatlı Yılmaz (O)	30	4	4	22	28	75	−47	16	Relegation to 1. Lig
16	Girne Halk Evi (R)	30	1	3	26	25	95	−70	6	Relegation to 1. Lig

Source: KTFF
Rules for classification: 1) Points; 2) Head-to-head points; 3) Head-to-head goal difference; 4) Overall goal difference.
(C) Champions; (O) Play-off winners; (R) Relegated

== Relegation stage ==
Teams qualified between the 11th and the 14th position played a latter stage to determine the third relegated team. It was played only one round as the relegation position was determined.

Pos	Team	Pld	W	D	L	GF	GA	GD	Pts	Relegation	GÖÇ	TOL	HAM	BAF
1	Göçmenköy	1	1	0	0	3	1	+2	23			—	5–5	—
2	Türk Ocağı Limasol	1	0	1	0	5	5	0	21				—	3–1
3	Hamitköy (R)	1	0	1	0	5	5	0	19					—
4	Baf Ülkü Yurdu	1	0	0	1	1	3	−2	11	Relegation to the 1. Lig				

Source: RSSSF
(R) Relegated

== Top scorers ==
Rank	Player	Club	Goals
1	(Northern Cyprus) Remzi Betmezoğlu	Göçmenköy	25
1	(South Africa) Siboniso Mtshali	Alsancak Yeşilova	22
3	(Trinidad and Tobago) Quesi Weston	Alsancak Yeşilova	17
3	(Northern Cyprus) Kasım Tağman	Lefke	17
5	(Northern Cyprus) Toykan Hacet	Küçük Kaymaklı	15
