= 2020 KTFF Cypriot Cup =

2020 Cypriot Cup
Tournament details
- Country: Northern Cyprus

Final positions
- Champions: Yenicami Ağdelen; 8th title
- Runners-up: Mağusa Türk Gücü

The 2020 Cypriot Cup was the 61st edition of the Northern Cyprus national football knockout tournament. It was suspended from March to June due to the COVID-19 pandemic.

Yenicami Ağdelen won its eighth title after defeating Mağusa Türk Gücü in the final.

== Round of 32 ==
All clubs from the season's Süper Lig and 1. Lig joined the tournament since its first round. Matches were played on 27 and 28 December 2019.

Team 1	Score	Team 2
Gençler Birliği (2)	0–3	Mağusa Türk Gücü (1)
Yenicami Ağdelen (1)	w/o	Doğancı (2)
Türk Ocağı Limasol (1)	5–0	Çanakkale (2)
Gönyeli (1)	3–0	Maraş (2)
Hamitköy (1)	5–2	Esentepe (2)
Küçük Kaymaklı (1)	4–1	Dumlupınar (1)
Düzkaya (1)	3–2	Görneç (2)
Lapta Türk Birliği (2)	0–4	Alsancak Yeşilova (1)
Bostancı Bağcıl (2)	0–6	Doğan Türk Birliği (1)
Cihangir (1)	6–0	Ozanköy (2)
Yalova (2)	2–3	Binatlı Yılmaz (1)
Mormenekşe (2)	1–4	Lefke (1)
Göçmenköy (1)	1–0 (a.e.t.)	Girne Halk Evi (2)
Dörtyol (2)	2–3 (a.e.t.)	Gençlik Gücü (2)
Karşıyaka (2)	2–0	Baf Ülkü Yurdu (1)
Mesarya (2)	4–5 (a.e.t.)	Çetinkaya (1)

== Round of 16 ==
All matches were played between 4 and 5 February.

Team 1	Score	Team 2
Çetinkaya (1)	2–1	Lefke (1)
Yenicami Ağdelen (1)	3–2	Alsancak Yeşilova (1)
Gönyeli (1)	1–2	Küçük Kaymaklı (1)
Doğan Türk Birliği (1)	3–0	Hamitköy (1)
Düzkaya (1)	1–3	Göçmenköy (1)
Binatlı Yılmaz (1)	1–2	Mağusa Türk Gücü (1)
Cihangir (1)	1–0	Gençlik Gücü (2)
Karşıyaka (2)	0–1	Türk Ocağı Limasol (1)

== Quarter-finals ==
The first legs of the quarter-finals were played on 25–26 February and the second legs on 10–11 March.

Team 1	Agg.	Team 2	1st leg	2nd leg
Küçük Kaymaklı (1)	7–0	Yenicami Ağdelen (1)	0–4	0–3
Mağusa Türk Gücü (1)	3–2	Cihangir (1)	2–0	1–2
Türk Ocağı Limasol (1)	5–2	Çetinkaya (1)	2–1	3–1
Göçmenköy (1)	2–3	Doğan Türk Birliği (1)	0–1	2–2

== Semi-finals ==
The four quarter-final winners entered the semi-finals. The matches were played on 24 and 28–29 June 2020.

Team 1	Agg.	Team 2	1st leg	2nd leg
Mağusa Türk Gücü (1)	2–2 (a)	Doğan Türk Birliği (1)	0–1	2–1 (a.e.t.)
Yenicami Ağdelen (1)	4–1	Türk Ocağı Limasol (1)	0–0	4–1

== Final ==
The final was held between the two semi-final winners.

13 May 2020
7 August 2020

Mağusa Türk Gücü	1–3	Yenicami Ağdelen
Kaya 20'	Report	Okoye 13'; Abaka 42'; Altın 90'

Nicosia Atatürk Stadium, North Nicosia
Referee: Osman Özpaşa

== See also ==
- 2019–20 KTFF Süper Lig
