= 2023 KTFF Cypriot Cup =

2023 Cypriot Cup
Tournament details
- Country: Northern Cyprus

Final positions
- Champions: Türk Ocağı Limasol; 6th title
- Runners-up: Cihangir

The 2023 Cypriot Cup was the 62nd edition of the Northern Cyprus national football knockout tournament.

Türk Ocağı Limasol won the title six years after their last Cup, by defeating Cihangir in the penalty-shootout.

== Round of 32 ==
All clubs from the season's Süper Lig and 1. Lig joined the tournament since its first round. Matches were played on 21 and 22 January.

Team 1	Score	Team 2
Yeniboğaziçi (2)	0–2	Yenicami Ağdelen (1)
Çetinkaya (1)	1–2	Gençler Birliği (2)
Küçük Kaymaklı (1)	1–0	Esentepe (2)
Düzkaya (2)	2–3(a.e.t.)	Gönyeli (1)
Binatlı Yılmaz (2)	1–4	Cihangir (1)
Yalova (2)	0–4	Mesarya (1)
Dörtyol (2)	1–10	Doğan Türk Birliği (1)
Karşıyaka (2)	1–3	Gençlik Gücü (1)
Türk Ocağı Limasol (1)	4–1	İncirli (2)
Hamitköy (1)	0–2	Lapta Türk Birliği (2)
Mormenekşe (2)	0–5	Alsancak Yeşilova (1)
Göçmenköy (1)	6–1	Yenierenköy (2)
Lefke (1)	3–2	Baf Ülkü Yurdu (2)
Dumlupınar (1)	1–0	Girne Halk Evi (2)
Yılmazköy (2)	1–4	Mağusa Türk Gücü (1)
Değirmenlik (1)	w.o. (Note: Match awarded to Maraş due to the disqualification of Değirmenlik.)	Maraş (2)

== Round of 16 ==
All matches were played between 21 and 23 February.

Team 1	Score	Team 2
Göçmenköy (1)	2–1 (a.e.t.)	Alsancak Yeşilova (1)
Küçük Kaymaklı (1)	2–0	Maraş (2)
Düzkaya (2)	0–2	Mağusa Türk Gücü (1)
Lapta Türk Birliği (2)	0–0 (a.e.t.) (6–5 p)	Gençler Birliği (2)
Cihangir (1)	2–1	Dumlupınar (1)
Mesarya (1)	1–2	Türk Ocağı Limasol (1)
Gençlik Gücü (1)	2–2 (a.e.t.) (10–9 p)	Lefke (1)
Yenicami Ağdelen (1)	2–4	Doğan Türk Birliği (1)

== Quarter-finals ==
The first legs of the quarter-finals were played on 14–15 March and the second legs on 28–29 March.

Team 1	Agg.	Team 2	1st leg	2nd leg
Türk Ocağı Limasol (1)	4–3	Doğan Türk Birliği (1)	2–2	2–1
Gençlik Gücü (1)	9–1	Lapta Türk Birliği (2)	4–0	1–5
Mağusa Türk Gücü (1)	1–1 (2–4 p)	Cihangir (1)	1–1	0–0 (a.e.t.)
Göçmenköy (1)	5–2	Küçük Kaymaklı (1)	2–2	3–0

== Semi-finals ==
The four quarter-final winners entered the semi-finals. The matches were played on 3–4 and 17 April 2023.

Team 1	Agg.	Team 2	1st leg	2nd leg
Türk Ocağı Limasol (1)	4–3	Gençlik Gücü (1)	2–2	2–1
Göçmenköy (1)	1–4	Cihangir (1)	1–0	0–4

== Final ==
The final was held between the two semi-final winners.

11 May 2023

Türk Ocağı Limasol	3–3 (a.e.t.)	Cihangir
	Report
Penalties
	5–3

Nicosia Atatürk Stadium, North Nicosia
Referee: Utku Hamamcıoğlu

== See also ==
- 2022–23 KTFF Süper Lig
