= Junior Ogedi-Uzokwe =

English footballer (born 1994)

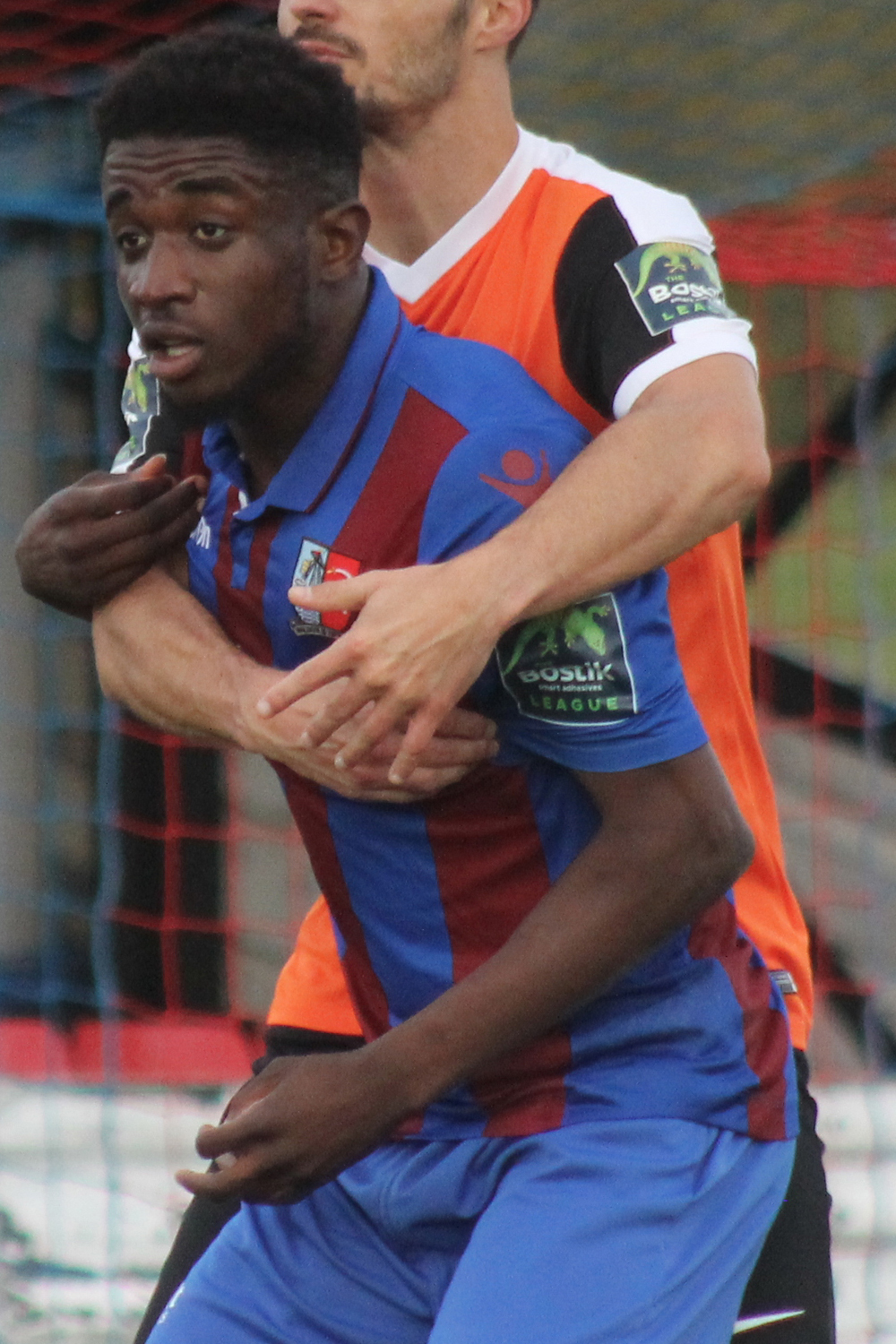
- Ogedi-Uzokwe playing for Maldon & Tiptree in October 2017

Personal information
- Full name: Junior Chukwuemeka Ogedi-Uzokwe
- Date of birth: 3 March 1994 (age 32)
- Place of birth: England
- Height: 1.85 m (6 ft 1 in)
- Position: Forward

Team information
- Current team: Dungannon Swifts
- Number: 40

Youth career
- Leyton Orient
- Ilford
- Millwall

Senior career*
Years	Team	Apps	(Gls)
2013	Enfield 1893	4	(0)
2013–2014	Aveley	2	(0)
2014	Hucknall Town	8	(8)
2014	Carlton Town	10	(3)
2014–2015	Gedling Miners Welfare	6	(6)
2015	Hayes & Yeading United	7	(1)
2015	Barkingside	14	(4)
2015	Lewes	4	(0)
2016–2017	Türk Ocağı Limasol	42	(10)
2017–2018	Maldon & Tiptree	25	(26)
2018–2020	Colchester United	12	(1)
2018–2019	→ Bromley (loan)	25	(6)
2019	→ Derry City (loan)	33	(14)
2020	Hapoel Hadera	5	(0)
2020	Sligo Rovers	12	(2)
2021	Dundalk	12	(2)
2021	→ Derry City (loan)	15	(6)
2022	Bohemians	19	(4)
2023–2024	Glentoran	51	(13)
2024	Galway United	4	(0)
2025	Karşıyaka Anamur	17	(11)
2025–2026	Dungannon Swifts	20	(7)
2026	Al-Shabab	3	(2)
2026–	Dungannon Swifts	11	(1)
- * Club domestic league appearances and goals as of 13:16, 29 October 2026 (UTC)

Junior Chukwuemeka Ogedi-Uzokwe also known as Junior (born 3 March 1994) is an English professional footballer who plays as a forward for NIFL Premiership club Dungannon Swifts.

Ogedi-Uzokwe was a member of the youth teams at Leyton Orient, Ilford and Millwall before making the step up to men's football. Ogedi-Uzokwe spent the 2013–14 season with Enfield 1893, Aveley and Hucknall Town, before joining Carlton Town in July 2014. In January 2015, he joined Hayes & Yeading United and marked his debut with a goal.

In the summer of 2015, Ogedi-Uzokwe joined Barkingside, before a move to Lewes in December 2015. He then spent 18 months with Türk Ocağı Limasol, where he won the Cypriot Cup. In July 2017, he joined Isthmian League North Division club Maldon & Tiptree – where he scored 34 goals in 34 games. His prolific scoring form earned him a contract with English Football League side Colchester United in January 2018. He signed for Bromley on loan in July 2018, and then Derry City on loan in February 2019. Following the completion of his loan with Derry, he made a permanent move to Israeli Premier League club Hapoel Hadera in February 2020. Due to the Israeli Premier League cancellation he then moved back to the League of Ireland Premier Division to join Sligo Rovers. He moved to Dundalk in February 2021, before returning to Derry City on loan in July 2021.He spent the 2022 season with Bohemians, before joining NIFL Premiership side Glentoran in January 2023, where he remained for 18 months before returning to the League of Ireland with Galway United for the second half of 2024.

== Career ==
=== Early career ===
Ogedi-Uzokwe was a member of the youth teams at two English Football League clubs, Leyton Orient and Millwall, separated by a spell at Ilford. He made the step up to men's football at Enfield 1893 at the age of 18. In late 2013, he signed for Aveley before moving to Nottingham and signing for Hucknall Town and Carlton Town. He returned south to play for Hayes & Yeading United, Barkingside and Lewes.

=== Türk Ocağı Limasol ===
On 26 January 2016, Ogedi-Uzokwe joined Northern Cypriot club Türk Ocağı Limasol. He made his debut the following day in a 2–0 victory against Gençli̇k Gücü in the Cypriot Cup Second Round first leg. On 31 January, Ogedi-Uzokwe scored his first goal for the club in the 7–0 second leg victory. After going four games without a goal, he scored both goals in a 2–0 win at Yeni̇cami AK on 5 March. Ogedi-Uzokwe scored his first goal of the season two weeks later in a 3–1 win against Bostanci Bağcil.

In September 2016, Ogedi-Uzokwe returned to the club for a second season but went seven games without a goal. He eventually scored in a 1–0 win against Küçük Kaymakli on 13 November. His second goal came a month later when opening the scoring of a 2–0 win against Gençli̇k Gücü on 30 December. Following a further 14 goalless games for Ogedi-Uzokwe, mostly because he was playing as a midfielder, he scored three goals in April to seal league victories against Çetinkaya Türk and Ci̇hangi̇r.

Having appeared in every match of the 2016–17 league campaign, Ogedi-Uzokwe scored twice on the final day of the season in a 6–2 win against Gençli̇k Gücü. A week later, he played 89 minutes in a 1–0 victory against Yalova in the Cypriot Cup Final to celebrate his first piece of silverware with the club.

=== Maldon & Tiptree ===
In July 2017, Ogedi-Uzokwe joined Isthmian League North Division club Maldon & Tiptree upon his return to England. He made his debut in a 1–0 win at Ware on 12 August, and scored his first and second goals for the club a week later in a 5–1 win against Waltham Abbey on his home debut. In September 2017, Ogedi-Uzokwe scored 10 goals in just eight games, including a hat-trick in a 4–2 win against Tilbury. The following month, he scored eight goals in seven games. During his goalscoring run, he scored in nine consecutive games from 23 September to 28 October, and scored in 15 consecutive league games between 9 September and 2 December.

On 25 November, he scored his second hat-trick of the season in a 5–1 win versus Dereham Town. On 1 January 2018, Ogedi-Uzokwe marked his final appearance for the club with a 90th-minute winner against Witham Town. He scored both goals in the 2–1 victory. He left the club having scored 34 goals in 34 games in all competitions.

=== Colchester United ===
On 3 January 2018, Ogedi-Uzokwe joined League Two club Colchester United alongside Maldon & Tiptree teammate Ryan Gondoh. He signed an 18-month deal. He made his professional debut for Colchester on 20 January 2018 as an injury time substitute in their 1–1 draw with Grimsby Town. He then scored his first professional goal on his first start for the club from the penalty spot, before turning provider for Mikael Mandron in Colchester's 2–1 win against Coventry City on 13 February. After nine appearances in the 2017–18 season, he vowed to return stronger for Colchester after a full pre-season with the club.

==== Bromley loan ====
On 27 July 2018, National League side Bromley signed Ogedi-Uzokwe on loan until January 2019. He made his Bromley debut as a second-half substitute in their 2–1 defeat at AFC Fylde on 4 August. He scored his first goal for the club with an 88th-minute winner in a 1–0 win over Gateshead on 18 August.

==== Derry City loan ====
On 7 February 2019, Ogedi-Uzokwe joined League of Ireland Premier Division side Derry City on loan until 30 June. He made his debut on 15 February in Derry's 3–0 win against UCD. He scored his first goal for the club in a 3–0 win in the League of Ireland Cup against Longford Town on 2 April. His loan was extended to the end of the League of Ireland season after an automatic one-year contract extension was activated by Colchester. Junior finished the season with 16 goals and 11 assists in all competition. Finishing as the league's top scorer with 14 goals and helping Derry to secure UEFA Europa League for the following season.

=== Hapoel Hadera ===
On 5 February, Colchester United announced the departure of Ogedi-Uzokwe to Israeli Premier League side Hapoel Hadera on a permanent contract. He made his debut for the club the same day, starting in a 1–0 win against Bnei Yehuda.

=== Sligo Rovers ===
On 24 July 2020 Junior Ogedi-Uzokwe signed for Irish club Sligo Rovers. Junior scored his first goal for the club in a 3–1 victory over Dundalk FC. Ogedi-Uzokwe's second goal for Sligo Rovers came two months later, in a 2–1 victory over Cork City. This result all but confirmed City's relegation from the Premier Division. In his 15 appearances and 2 goals in all competitions, Ogedi-Uzokwe helped Sligo to secure a 4th-place finish and UEFA Europa Conference League football for the 2021 season.

=== Dundalk ===
On 24 February 2021, Ogedi-Uzokwe signed for his third League of Ireland Premier Division club, Dundalk ahead of their 2021 season. His competitive debut for the club saw him earn a winners medal as his side won the 2021 President's Cup by beating Shamrock Rovers on penalties after a 1–1 draw at Tallaght Stadium on 12 March 2021. Ogedi-Uzokwe's first goal for the club came on 17 April 2021 when he scored an 85th minutes equalizer against league leaders St Patrick's Athletic at Oriel Park.

==== Derry City loan ====
Ogedi-Uzokwe returned to Derry City on loan for the second time in his career on 1 July 2021 until the end of the season. He scored his first goal since his return to the club on 16 July 2021 in a 4–2 loss to Shamrock Rovers at the Ryan McBride Brandywell Stadium. Ogedi-Uzokwe scored 6 goals in 15 appearances during his loan spell, helping Derry to a 4th-place finish, 2 places above his parent club Dundalk.

=== Bohemians ===
Ogedi-Uzokwe signed a multi-year contract with Bohemians ahead of the 2022 season.

=== Glentoran ===
In January 2023 on the transfer deadline day he signed for NIFL Premiership club Glentoran. On 7 May 2024, it was announced that Ogedi-Uzokwe would be one of ten players departing Glentoran upon the expiry of their contracts.

=== Galway United ===
On 1 July 2024, Ogedi-Uzokwe returned to the League of Ireland Premier Division with Galway United. On 12 November 2024, it was announced that Ogedi-Uzokwe had departed the club after just 5 appearances, the last of which coming just over 3 months earlier.

=== Karşıyaka Anamur ===
In January 2025, Ogedi-Uzokwe returned to Northern Cyprus for the first time since 2017 to join KTFF Süper Lig side Karşıyaka Anamur.

=== Dungannon Swifts ===
In September 2025, Ogedi-Uzokwe joined NIFL Premiership side Dungannon Swifts. On 27 January 2026, he left the club.

=== Al-Shabab ===
On 31 January 2026, he joined Kuwait Premier League side Al-Shabab.

=== Return to Dungannon Swifts ===
On 7 August 2026, Ogedi-Uzokwe re-joined NIFL Premiership side Dungannon Swifts.

== Career statistics ==
As of match played 24 October 2026

Appearances and goals by club, season and competition
Club	Season	League			National Cup (Note: Includes FA Cup, Cypriot Cup, FAI Cup, Israel State Cup, Irish Cup & Kuwait Emir Cup)		League Cup (Note: Includes Alan Turvey Trophy, East Midlands Counties Football League Cup, EFL Cup, League of Ireland Cup & Northern Ireland Football League Cup)		Other		Total	
Club	Season	Division	Apps	Goals	Apps	Goals	Apps	Goals	Apps	Goals	Apps	Goals
Aveley	2013–14	IL Division One North	2	0	0	0	2	0	0	0	4	0
Carlton Town	2014–15	NPL Division One South	10	3	2	2	—		0	0	12	5
Gedling Miners Welfare	2014–15	EM Counties League	6	6	0	0	1	0	1 (Note: Appearance in the Nottinghamshire Senior Cup)	0	8	6
Hayes & Yeading United	2014–15	Conference South	7	1	0	0	—		0	0	7	1
Barkingside	2015–16	IL Division One North	14	4	1	0	0	0	1 (Note: Appearance in the FA Trophy)	0	16	4
Lewes	2015–16	IL Premier Division	4	0	0	0	0	0	0	0	4	0
Türk Ocağı Limasol	2015–16	KTFF Süper Lig	12	3	4	1	—		—		16	4
Türk Ocağı Limasol	2016–17	KTFF Süper Lig	30	7	7	0	—		—		37	7
Türk Ocağı Limasol	Total		42	10	11	1	—		—		53	11
Maldon & Tiptree	2017–18	IL Division One North	25	26	3	4	2	0	6 (Note: Three appearances and four goals in the FA Trophy; One appearance in the Essex Senior Cup)	4	34	34
Colchester United	2017–18	League Two	9	1	0	0	0	0	0	0	9	1
Colchester United	2018–19	League Two	1	0	0	0	0	0	0	0	1	0
Colchester United	2019–20	League Two	2	0	0	0	0	0	0	0	2	0
Colchester United	Total		12	1	0	0	0	0	0	0	12	1
Bromley (loan)	2018–19	National League	25	6	0	0	—		0	0	25	6
Derry City (loan)	2019	LOI Premier Division	31	14	0	0	3	2	0	0	34	16
Hapoel Hadera	2019–20	Israeli Premier League	5	0	0	0	—		0	0	5	0
Sligo Rovers	2020	LOI Premier Division	12	2	3	0	—		—		15	2
Dundalk	2021	LOI Premier Division	12	2	—		—		1 (Note: Appearance in the President's Cup)	0	13	2
Derry City (loan)	2021	LOI Premier Division	15	6	2	0	—		—		17	6
Bohemians	2022	LOI Premier Division	19	4	1	1	—		—		20	5
Glentoran	2022–23	NIFL Premiership	13	2	2	0	—		2 (Note: Appearances in the 2023 NIFL Premiership European Play-offs)	2	17	4
Glentoran	2023–24	NIFL Premiership	38	11	3	2	1	0	3 (Note: Two appearances and one goal in the UEFA Europa Conference League; One appearance in the 2024 NIFL Premiership European Play-offs)	1	45	14
Glentoran	Total		51	13	5	2	1	0	5	3	53	23
Galway United	2024	LOI Premier Division	4	0	1	1	—		—		5	1
Karşıyaka Anamur	2024–25	KTFF Süper Lig	17	11	0	0	—		—		17	11
Dungannon Swifts	2025–26	NIFL Premiership	20	7	1	1	2	1	2 (Note: Appreances in the Mid-Ulster Cup)	2	25	11
Al-Shabab	2025–26	Kuwait Premier League	3	2	0	0	—		—		3	2
Dungannon Swifts	2026–27	NIFL Premiership	11	1	0	0	1	0	0 (Note: Appreances in the Mid-Ulster Cup)	0	12	1
Career total			297	106	24	10	11	3	9	6	341	125

== Honours ==
=== Club ===
Türk Ocağı Limasol

- Cypriot Cup: 2017

Dundalk

- President's Cup: 2021

=== Individual ===
- League of Ireland Premier Division top scorer: 2019
