= 2012–13 KTFF Süper Lig =

Süper Lig
- Season: 2012–13
- Dates: 28 September 2012 – 15 May 2013
- Champions: Çetinkaya; 14th title
- Top goalscorer: (Northern Cyprus) Esin Sonay (26 goals)

The 2012–13 KTFF Süper Lig season was the 53rd season of the Süper Lig in Northern Cyprus. Çetinkaya defended successfully the title and achieved its 14th league overall.

== Format ==
The 2012–13 season was set to continue with the same format used the previous season. The two last teams were directly relegated to the 1. Lig, while qualified teams between the 9th and the 12th position played a relegation stage where the last qualified was also relegated.

== Teams ==
A total of fourteen teams contested the league, including eleven sides from the 2011–12 season and three promoted from the 2011–12 KTFF 1. Lig. This includes the two top teams from the 1. Lig, and the winner of the promotion play-offs.

Promoted from 2011–12 1. Lig	Relegated from 2011–12 Süper Lig
Gençlik Gücü; Serdarlı; Hamitköy	Düzkaya; Tatlısu; Gönyeli

== League table ==
Pos	Team	Pld	W	D	L	GF	GA	GD	Pts	Qualification or relegation
1	Çetinkaya (C)	26	21	4	1	81	20	+61	67	
2	Yenicami Ağdelen	26	18	4	4	56	26	+30	58	
3	Küçük Kaymaklı	26	15	4	7	58	26	+32	49	
4	Bostancı Bağcıl	26	13	4	9	46	42	+4	43	
5	Doğan Türk Birliği	26	12	5	9	52	45	+7	41	
6	Lefke	26	10	7	9	36	32	+4	37 (Note: Lefke finished ahead of Cihangir on head-to-head points: Lefke, 4 points; Cihangir, 1 point.)	
7	Cihangir	26	11	4	11	44	38	+6	37	
8	Hamitköy	26	9	6	11	34	47	−13	33 (Note: Hamitköy finished ahead of Mağusa Türk Gücü on head-to-head points: Hamitköy, 6 points; Mağusa Türk Gücü, 0 points.)	
9	Mağusa Türk Gücü (O)	26	9	6	11	42	40	+2	33	Qualification to relegation stage
10	Gençlik Gücü (O)	26	10	2	14	41	53	−12	32	Qualification to relegation stage
11	Lapta Türk Birliği (R)	26	8	6	12	30	41	−11	30	Qualification to relegation stage
12	Serdarlı (O)	26	8	3	15	32	55	−23	27	Qualification to relegation stage
13	Türk Ocağı Limasol (R)	26	7	2	17	36	65	−29	23	Relegation to 1. Lig
14	Göçmenköy (R)	26	2	1	23	19	77	−58	7	Relegation to 1. Lig

Source: RSSSF
Rules for classification: 1) Points; 2) Head-to-head points; 3) Head-to-head goal difference; 4) Overall goal difference.
(C) Champions; (O) Play-off winners; (R) Relegated

== Relegation stage ==
Teams qualified between the 9th and the 12th position played a latter stage to determine the third relegated team.

Pos	Team	Pld	W	D	L	GF	GA	GD	Pts	Relegation	SER	GEG	MTG	LAP
1	Serdarlı	3	2	1	0	7	5	+2	7				2–1	
2	Gençlik Gücü	3	1	1	1	5	5	0	4		0–1			1–1
3	Mağusa Türk Gücü	3	1	0	2	9	8	+1	3			3–4		5–2
4	Lapta Türk Birliği (R)	3	0	2	1	7	10	−3	2	Relegation to 1. Lig	4–4			

Source: RSSSF
(R) Relegated
