= 2022–23 KTFF Süper Lig =

Süper Lig
- Season: 2022–23
- Dates: 22 September 2022 – 25 May 2023
- Champions: Mağusa Türk Gücü; 12th title
- Relegated: Hamitköy; Gönyeli; Değirmenlik
- Top goalscorer: (Turkey) Muhittin Tümbül (24 goals)

The 2022–23 KTFF Süper Lig season was the 61st season of the Süper Lig in Northern Cyprus. Mağusa Türk Gücü were the reigning champions, winning their fourth successive title.

== Format ==
The 2022–23 season was set to continue with the same format used the previous season. The two last teams were directly relegated to the 1. Lig, while qualified teams between the 11th and the 14th position played a relegation stage where the last qualified was also relegated.

== Teams ==
Location of 2021–22 KTFF Süper Lig teams in Northern Cyprus

A total of sixteen teams contest the league, including thirteen sides from the 2021–22 season and three promoted from the 2021–22 KTFF 1. Lig. This includes the two top teams from the 1. Lig, and the winners of the promotion play-offs.

Promoted from 2021–22 1. Lig	Relegated from 2021–22 Süper Lig
Çetinkaya; Gençlik Gücü; Değirmenlik	Baf Ülkü Yurdu; Binatlı Yılmaz; Girne Halk Evi

=== Stadiums and locations ===
Team	District	Stadium
Alsancak Yeşilova	Girne	Alsancak Mustafa Hidayet Çağlar Stadium
Cihangir	Lefkoşa	Cihangir Stadium
Çetinkaya	Lefkoşa	Lefkoşa Atatürk Stadium
Değirmenlik	Lefkoşa	Değirmenlik Sadık Cemil Stadium
Doğan Türk Birliği	Girne	Girne 20 Temmuz Mete Adanır Stadium
Dumlupınar	Gazimağusa	Dr. Fazıl Küçük Stadium
Gençlik Gücü	Lefkoşa	Lefkoşa Atatürk Stadium
Göçmenkoy	Lefkoşa	Göçmenköy Stadium
Gönyeli	Lefkoşa	Ali Naci Karacan Stadium
Hamitköy	Lefkoşa	Hamitköy Stadium
Küçük Kaymaklı	Lefkoşa	Lefkoşa Şehit Hüseyin Ruso Stadium
Lefke	Lefke	August 16 Victory Stadium
Mağusa Türk Gücü	Gazimağusa	Gazimağusa Canbulat Stadium
Mesarya	Gazimağusa	Paşaköy Hasan Onalt Stadium
Türk Ocağı Limasol	Girne	Girne 20 Temmuz Mete Adanır Stadium
Yenicami Ağdelen	Lefkoşa	Lefkoşa Atatürk Stadium

== League table ==
Pos	Team	Pld	W	D	L	GF	GA	GD	Pts	Qualification or relegation
1	Mağusa Türk Gücü (C)	29	26	2	1	89	27	+62	80	
2	Cihangir	29	19	4	6	62	33	+29	61 (Note: Cihangir finished ahead of Mesarya on head-to-head points: Cihangir, 4 points; Mesarya, 1 point.)	
3	Mesarya	29	18	7	4	61	31	+30	61	
4	Doğan Türk Birliği	29	17	6	6	69	31	+38	57	
5	Yenicami Ağdelen	29	14	7	8	57	47	+10	49 (Note: Yenicami finished ahead of Dumlupınar on head-to-head points: Yenicami, 4 points; Dumlupınar, 1 point.)	
6	Dumlupınar	29	14	7	8	46	36	+10	49	
7	Lefke	29	11	6	12	35	38	−3	39	
8	Alsancak Yeşilova	29	10	6	13	43	52	−9	36	
9	Küçük Kaymaklı	29	9	6	14	35	51	−16	33	
10	Göçmenköy	29	8	5	16	43	60	−17	29	
11	Çetinkaya (O)	29	7	5	17	34	63	−29	26	Qualification for the relegation stage
12	Gençlik Gücü (O)	29	6	7	16	34	59	−25	25	Qualification for the relegation stage
13	Hamitköy (R)	29	7	3	19	34	56	−22	24	Qualification for the relegation stage
14	Türk Ocağı Limasol (O)	29	7	2	20	34	56	−22	23	Qualification for the relegation stage
15	Gönyeli (R)	29	2	5	22	31	84	−53	11	Relegation to 1. Lig
16	Değirmenlik (D)	0	0	0	0	0	0	0	0	Relegation to 1. Lig

Source: RSSSF
Rules for classification: 1) Points; 2) Head-to-head points; 3) Head-to-head goal difference; 4) Fair Play
(C) Champions; (D) Disqualified; (O) Play-off winners; (R) Relegated

== Relegation stage ==
Teams qualified between the 11th and the 14th position played a latter stage to determine the third relegated team.

Pos	Team	Pld	W	D	L	GF	GA	GD	Pts	Relegation	ÇET	GEG	TOL	HAM
1	Çetinkaya	2	2	0	0	9	5	+4	19			—	5–3	4–2
2	Gençlik Gücü	2	1	0	1	3	3	0	16				0–2	3–1
3	Türk Ocağı Limasol	3	1	1	1	7	7	0	16					
4	Hamitköy (R)	3	0	1	2	5	9	−4	13	Relegation to the 1. Lig			2–2	

Source: RSSSF
(R) Relegated

== Top scorers ==
Rank	Player	Club	Goals
1	(Turkey) Muhittin Tümbül	Cihangir	24
1	(Benin) Mickaël Poté	Karşıyaka	22
3	(Guinea) Badara Naby Sylla	Gençler Birliği	21
3	(Benin) Quentin Debouto	Değirmenlik	21
5	(Northern Cyprus) Şenol Şöför	Mağusa Türk Gücü	16
