= 2024–25 KTFF Süper Lig =

Süleyman Göktaş Süper Lig
- Season: 2024–25
- Dates: 19 September 2024 – 18 May 2025
- Champions: Mağusa Türk Gücü; 14th title
- Relegated: Göçmenköy; Gençler Birliği; Değirmenlik
- Matches: 231
- Goals: 751 (3.25 per match)
- Top goalscorer: (Guinea-Bissau) Ussumane Djabi (26 goals)
- Biggest home win: Mağusa Türk Gücü 7–0 Gönyeli (9 March 2025)
- Highest scoring: Gençler Birliği 3–8 Mağusa Türk Gücü (3 May 2025)

The 2024–25 KTFF Süper Lig season was the 63rd season of the Süper Lig in Northern Cyprus. It was officially named Süleyman Göktaş Süper Lig, in honor of former KTFF president Süleyman Göktaş, that died the previous day of the announcement.

Mağusa Türk Gücü were the reigning champions, winning their sixth successive title on the final day of the season with a late win against Gençler Birliği.

== Format ==
The 2024–25 season was set to continue with the same format used the previous season. The two last teams were directly relegated to the 1. Lig, while qualified teams between the 11th and the 14th position played a relegation stage where the last qualified was also relegated.

== Teams ==
Location of 2024–25 KTFF Süper Lig teams in Northern Cyprus

A total of sixteen teams contest the league, including thirteen sides from the 2023–24 season and three promoted from the 2023–24 KTFF 1. Lig. This includes the two top teams from the 1. Lig, and the winners of the promotion play-offs.

Promoted from 2023–24 1. Lig	Relegated from 2023–24 Süper Lig
Değirmenlik; Gönyeli; Esentepe	Küçük Kaymaklı; Yeniboğaziçi; Türk Ocağı Limasol

=== Stadiums and locations ===
Team	District	Stadium
Alsancak Yeşilova	Girne	Alsancak Mustafa Hidayet Çağlar Stadium
Cihangir	Lefkoşa	Cihangir Stadium
Çetinkaya	Lefkoşa	Lefkoşa Atatürk Stadium
Değirmenlik	Lefkoşa	Değirmenlik Sadık Cemil Stadium
Doğan Türk Birliği	Girne	Girne 20 Temmuz Mete Adanır Stadium
Dumlupınar	Gazimağusa	Gazimağusa Dr. Fazıl Küçük Stadium
Esentepe	Girne	Esentepe Erdal Barut Stadium
Gençler Birliği	İskele	İskele Cumhuriyet Stadium
Gençlik Gücü	Lefkoşa	Lefkoşa Atatürk Stadium
Göçmenköy İdman Yurdu	Lefkoşa	Lefkoşa Atatürk Stadium
Gönyeli	Lefkoşa	Gönyeli Stadium
Karşıyaka	Girne	Karşıyaka Şampiyon Melekler Stadium
Lefke	Lefke	Lefke 16 Ağustos Stadium
Mağusa Türk Gücü	Gazimağusa	Gazimağusa Dr. Fazıl Küçük Stadium
Mesarya	Gazimağusa	Paşaköy Hasan Onalt Stadium
Yenicami Ağdelen	Lefkoşa	Lefkoşa Atatürk Stadium

== Foreign players ==
Each team was allowed to register three foreign players before the start of the season.

Players name in italics indicates the player is registered during the mid-season transfer window.

Club	Player 1	Player 2	Player 3	Former players
Alsancak Yeşilova	(South Africa) Siboniso Mtshali	(Nigeria) Toheeb Lawal	(Trinidad and Tobago) Quesi Weston	(Nigeria) Fidelis Iria
Cihangir	(Senegal) Babacar Diop	(Gabon) Laurys N'Dong	(Mauritania) Omaré Gassama	(Guinea) Guy-Michel Landel (Nigeria) Adewole Oladimeji
Çetinkaya	(Senegal) Manoumbe Wade	(Guinea) Moussa Corso Traoré	(Guinea-Bissau) Ussumane Djabi	(The Gambia) Pa Omar Jobe
Değirmenlik	(Cameroon) Aminu Umar	(Nigeria) Miracle Nwaorisa	(Benin) Quentin Debouto	(Nigeria) Chukwuma Akabueze (Senegal) Ibrahima Baldé
Doğan Türk Birliği	(Cameroon) Macdonald Niba	(France) Gime Touré	(Nigeria) Billy Auta Michael	
Dumlupınar	(Nigeria) Joseph Godwin	(Cameroon) Junior Adjessa	(Turkey) Mahmut Demirgan	(Turkey) Hikmet Çelikel
Esentepe	(Cameroon) Frank Nyobe Nyobe	(Nigeria) Lukman Adeshina	(Cameroon) Benjamin Bieleu	
Gençler Birliği	(Nigeria) Gabriel Bawa	(Netherlands) Mikhail Rosheuvel	(Republic of the Congo) Kévin Koubemba	(Ivory Coast) Yann Regis Toually (Uzbekistan) Ernest Velilyayev
Gençlik Gücü	(Guinea) Nfanly Sylla	(Burundi) Yannick Nkurunziza	(Senegal) Oumar Diouf	(Ivory Coast) Mohamed Cherif Fofana (Sierra Leone) Abu Dumbuya
Göçmenköy	(Central African Republic) Karl Namnganda	(Republic of the Congo) Marius Mbou	(Nigeria) Ikechukwu Okorie	(Benin) Quentin Debouto (Nigeria) Salim Obaje Okai
Gönyeli	(Ivory Coast) Abdoul Razak	(Mali) Ladji Mallé	(Mauritania) Souleymane Doukara	(Ghana) Elvis Nyarko
Karşıyaka	(England) Junior Ogedi-Uzokwe	(The Gambia) Muhammed Jatta	(Senegal) Mahfou Kandé	(Nigeria) James Arong (South Africa) Siboniso Mtshali
Lefke	(Ivory Coast) Yao Kouassi	(Nigeria) Candy Agbane	(Nigeria) Chigozie Armstrong Chidi	(Central African Republic) Christopher Fourmy
Mağusa Türk Gücü	(Ghana) Isaac Cofie	(Nigeria) Andy Okpe	(Nigeria) Dinopeter Airaodion	(Senegal) Opa Nguette (Ivory Coast) Abdoul Razak (France) Rashad Muhammed
Mesarya	(Nigeria) Jamiu Arowolo	(Nigeria) Uzochukwu Ugwu	(Nigeria) Tony Obia	(Nigeria) Miracle Nwaorisa (Nigeria) Paul Chinedu Ngwu
Yenicami Ağdelen	(Angola) Jimmy Mpanzu	(Nigeria) Adewale Sapara	(Guinea) Elhadj Bah	(Cameroon) Man-Ykre Dangmo (Guinea) Nfanly Sylla

== League table ==
Pos	Team	Pld	W	D	L	GF	GA	GD	Pts	Qualification or relegation
1	Mağusa Türk Gücü (C)	30	22	6	2	91	30	+61	72	
2	Doğan Türk Birliği	30	21	7	2	67	25	+42	70	
3	Cihangir	30	18	4	8	65	40	+25	58	
4	Gençlik Gücü	30	16	3	11	53	41	+12	51 (Note: Gençlik Gücü finished ahead of Lefke on head-to-head points: Gençlik Gücü, 6 points; Lefke, 0 points.)	
5	Lefke	30	16	3	11	49	45	+4	51	
6	Çetinkaya	30	14	5	11	62	46	+16	47	
7	Alsancak Yeşilova	30	13	6	11	53	49	+4	45	
8	Mesarya	30	11	6	13	49	53	−4	39	
9	Dumlupınar	30	12	2	16	47	55	−8	38	
10	Esentepe	30	10	7	13	37	44	−7	37	
11	Göçmenköy (R)	30	9	7	14	40	51	−11	34	Qualification for the relegation stage
12	Gönyeli (O)	30	9	4	17	47	65	−18	31 (Note: Gönyeli finished ahead of Karşıyaka on head-to-head points: Gönyeli, 4 points; Karşıyaka, 1 points.)	Qualification for the relegation stage
13	Karşıyaka (O)	30	9	4	17	40	72	−32	31	Qualification for the relegation stage
14	Yenicami Ağdelen (O)	30	7	3	20	43	63	−20	24	Qualification for the relegation stage
15	Gençler Birliği (R)	30	5	5	20	27	64	−37	20	Relegation to 1. Lig
16	Değirmenlik (D)	30	12	0	18	26	53	−27	0 (Note: Değirmenlik were expelled from the league and had all their points deducted.)	Relegation to 1. Lig

Source: KTFF
Rules for classification: 1) Points; 2) Head-to-head points; 3) Head-to-head goal difference; 4) Overall goal difference.
(C) Champions; (D) Disqualified; (O) Play-off winners; (R) Relegated

== Results ==
Home \ Away	YES	CIH	ÇET	DEG	DTB	DUM	ESE	LGB	GEG	GÖÇ	GÖN	KSK	LEF	MTG	MES	YEN
Alsancak Yeşilova		3–2	4–3	3–0^{1}	0–3	2–3	0–0	5–0	0–0	2–2	1–2	1–1	2–4	1–2	4–2	3–2
Cihangir	2–2		4–1	3–0^{1}	1–1	2–0	2–2	2–1	1–3	2–1	2–0	4–0	2–1	1–2	5–2	2–1
Çetinkaya	0–3	1–0		3–0^{1}	1–2	4–1	4–0	2–3	4–2	3–3	2–2	1–3	5–0	1–1	3–4	4–0
Değirmenlik	2–0	1–3	3–0		0–3^{1}	1–0	1–0	0–3^{1}	0–3^{1}	3–0	2–0	0–3^{1}	2–0	0–3^{1}	0–3^{1}	0–3^{1}
Doğan Türk Birliği	2–0	3–1	0–0	2–0		1–3	3–1	5–1	3–0	2–2	4–2	4–1	0–1	1–1	1–0	2–0
Dumlupınar	0–1	4–2	0–2	3–0^{1}	1–4		2–0	0–0	1–4	0–2	4–2	5–1	1–0	1–6	1–3	3–1
Esentepe	1–1	1–0	1–2	3–0^{1}	0–0	2–0		2–1	0–1	2–5	1–0	5–0	0–1	3–2	1–1	2–0
Gençler Birliği	0–2	2–3	2–1	0–3	2–2	0–3	1–3		1–4	0–2	2–1	1–0	1–2	3–8	0–0	0–1
Gençlik Gücü	2–0	0–3	0–1	0–2	0–1	2–0	2–1	1–0		0–3	2–2	1–2	4–3	0–2	1–2	4–1
Göçmenköy	0–3	0–4	1–4	3–0^{1}	0–1	3–0	1–0	0–0	0–3		1–2	1–3	1–2	1–2	1–1	0–3
Gönyeli	2–3	2–3	1–2	3–0^{1}	2–4	1–0	3–3	1–0	1–3	0–1		6–1	1–0	0–5	1–2	3–2
Karşıyaka	1–2	1–2	2–1	0–2	0–1	5–3	1–0	1–1	1–3	2–2	2–2		1–2	1–6	2–1	2–1
Lefke	1–0	1–1	0–4	3–0^{1}	2–3	3–3	4–1	3–0	1–2	2–0	1–0	3–1		2–4	2–1	2–1
Mağusa Türk Gücü	5–1	2–1	2–0	0–1	0–0	1–0	5–0	2–0	3–2	2–2	7–0	4–0	3–1		3–1	1–1
Mesarya	5–2	0–2	2–2	1–2	1–6	0–2	0–1	3–1	1–1	2–0	3–0	3–1	0–1	2–2		2–1
Yenicami Ağdelen	0–2	2–3	0–1	2–1	2–3	0–3	1–1	2–1	1–3	1–2	2–5	4–1	1–1	3–5	4–1	

Source: RSSSF
Legend: Blue = home team win; Yellow = draw; Red = away team win.
- ^{1} The opponents of Değirmenlik awarded a 3–0 win each after its disqualification during the second half of the season.

== Relegation stage ==
Teams qualified between the 11th and the 14th position played a latter stage to determine the third relegated team. The four teams started the stage with their points halved.

Pos	Team	Pld	W	D	L	GF	GA	GD	Pts	Relegation	KSK	GÖN	YEN	GÖÇ
1	Karşıyaka	3	3	0	0	8	5	+3	25				3–2	
2	Gönyeli	3	1	0	2	4	6	−2	19		1–2		0–3	
3	Yenicami Ağdelen	3	2	0	1	8	4	+4	18					
4	Göçmenköy (R)	3	0	0	3	4	9	−5	17	Relegation to the 1. Lig	2–3	1–3	1–3	

Source: RSSSF
(R) Relegated

== Top scorers ==
Rank	Player	Club	Goals
1	(Guinea-Bissau) Ussumane Djabi	Çetinkaya	26
2	(Northern Cyprus) Şenol Şöför	Mağusa Türk Gücü	25
3	(Central African Republic) Christopher Fourmy	Lefke	22
4	(Turkey) Muhittin Tümbül	Cihangir	19
4	(Senegal) Oumar Diouf	Gençlik Gücü	19
6	(Trinidad and Tobago) Quesi Weston	Alsancak Yeşilova	17
6	(Senegal) Babacar Diop	Cihangir	17
6	(Nigeria) Andy Okpe	Mağusa Türk Gücü	17
9	(Mauritania) Souleymane Doukara	Gönyeli	16
10	(Nigeria) Lukman Adeshina	Esentepe	14
