= 2018 KTFF Cypriot Cup =

2018 Cypriot Cup
Tournament details
- Country: Northern Cyprus

Final positions
- Champions: Cihangir; 1st title
- Runners-up: Mağusa Türk Gücü

The 2018 Cypriot Cup was the 59th edition of the Northern Cyprus national football knockout tournament.

Cihangir achieved their first title ever after defeating Mağusa Türk Gücü in the final.

== Round of 32 ==
All clubs from the season's Süper Lig and 1. Lig joined the tournament since its first round. Matches were played on 19, 20 and 21 January.

Team 1	Score	Team 2
Mağusa Türk Gücü (1)	4–0	Lapta Türk Birliği S.K. (2)
Yenicami Ağdelen (1)	6–0	Doğancı (2)
Girne Halk Evi (2)	0–0 (a.e.t.) (4–5 p)	Ozanköy (2)
Göçmenköy (2)	1–5	Küçük Kaymaklı (1)
Mormenekşe (2)	0–2	Türk Ocağı Limasol (1)
Çanakkale (2)	1–3	Baf Ülkü Yurdu (1)
Lefke (1)	5–2	Bostancı Bağcıl (2)
Vuda (2)	1–3	Yalova (1)
Görneç (2)	1–2	Doğan Türk Birliği (1)
Esentepe (2)	0–2	Cihangir (1)
Gönyeli (2)	1–3	Alsancak Yeşilova (1)
Mehmetçik (2)	0–2	Gençler Birliği (1)
Gençlik Gücü (1)	2–3	Hamitköy (2)
Yeniboğaziçi (2)	2–3	Dumlupınar (2)
Binatlı Yılmaz (1)	7–0	Değirmenlik (2)
Çetinkaya (1)	7–3	Maraş (2)

== Round of 16 ==
All matches were played on 7–8 February.

Team 1	Score	Team 2
Gençler Birliği (1)	2–1	Lefke (1)
Baf Ülkü Yurdu (1)	10–0	Hamitköy (2)
Mağusa Türk Gücü (1)	3–0	Dumlupınar (2)
Cihangir (1)	1–1 (a.e.t.) (6–5 p)	Türk Ocağı Limasol (1)
Küçük Kaymaklı (1)	3–2	Ozanköy (2)
Alsancak Yeşilova (1)	2–2 (a.e.t.) (5–4 p)	Yalova (1)
Yenicami Ağdelen (1)	3–3 (a.e.t.) (6–5 p)	Doğan Türk Birliği (1)
Binatlı Yılmaz (1)	0–2	Çetinkaya (1)

== Quarter-finals ==
The quarter-finals were played on 21–22 February and 7–8 March.

Team 1	Agg.	Team 2	1st leg	2nd leg
Küçük Kaymaklı (1)	6–2	Gençler Birliği (1)	3–1	1–3
Alsancak Yeşilova (1)	2–3	Mağusa Türk Gücü (1)	0–0	2–3
Baf Ülkü Yurdu (1)	1–2	Cihangir	0–2	0–1
Yenicami Ağdelen (1)	5–2	Çetinkaya	2–1	3–1

== Semi-finals ==
The four quarter-final winners entered the semi-finals. The matches were played on 10 and 24 April.

Team 1	Agg.	Team 2	1st leg	2nd leg
Yenicami Ağdelen (1)	1–2	Mağusa Türk Gücü (1)	1–1	0–1
Küçük Kaymaklı (1)	1–1 (a)	Cihangir (1)	1–1	0–0

== Final ==
The final was held between the two semi-final winners.

11 May 2018

Cihangir	3–1	Mağusa Türk Gücü
	Report

Nicosia Atatürk Stadium, North Nicosia
Referee: Mehmet Malek

== See also ==
- 2017–18 KTFF Süper Lig
