= 2019–20 KTFF Süper Lig =

Süper Lig
- Season: 2019–20
- Dates: 12 September 2019 – 30 July 2020
- Champions: Mağusa Türk Gücü; 10th title
- Top goalscorer: (Nigeria) John Okoye Ebuka (39 goals)

The 2019–20 KTFF Süper Lig season was the 59th season of the Süper Lig in Northern Cyprus. Mağusa Türk Gücü were the reigning champions, winning their third successive title.

Due to the COVID-19 pandemic, the league was suspended from March to June 2020.

== Format ==
The 2019–20 season was set to continue with the same format used the previous season. The two last teams were directly relegated to the 1. Lig, while qualified teams between the 11th and the 14th position played a relegation stage where the last qualified was also relegated.

== Teams ==
A total of sixteen teams contest the league, including thirteen sides from the 2018–19 season and three promoted from the 2018–19 KTFF 1. Lig. This includes the two top teams from the 1. Lig, and the winners of the promotion play-offs.

Promoted from 2018–19 1. Lig	Relegated from 2018–19 Süper Lig
Göçmenköy; Düzkaya; Hamitköy	Esentepe; Gençler Birliği; Girne Halk Evi

== League table ==
Pos	Team	Pld	W	D	L	GF	GA	GD	Pts	Qualification or relegation
1	Mağusa Türk Gücü (C)	30	24	4	2	104	31	+73	76	
2	Alsancak Yeşilova	30	18	5	7	82	49	+33	59	
3	Doğan Türk Birliği	30	17	6	7	60	41	+19	57	
4	Türk Ocağı Limasol	30	14	10	6	55	40	+15	52	
5	Yenicami Ağdelen	30	15	6	9	86	60	+26	51	
6	Baf Ülkü Yurdu	30	13	5	12	47	53	−6	44	
7	Cihangir	30	13	4	13	66	57	+9	43	
8	Göçmenköy	30	12	6	12	47	54	−7	42	
9	Lefke	30	11	6	13	48	57	−9	39	
10	Küçük Kaymaklı	30	11	5	14	54	63	−9	37 (Note: Küçük Kaymaklı was deducted 1 point.)	
11	Gönyeli (O)	30	11	3	16	61	72	−11	36	Qualification for the relegation stage
12	Binatlı Yılmaz (O)	30	9	7	14	50	62	−12	34	Qualification for the relegation stage
13	Hamitköy (O)	30	9	7	14	50	68	−18	34	Qualification for the relegation stage
14	Düzkaya (R)	30	7	5	18	41	77	−36	26	Qualification for the relegation stage
15	Çetinkaya (R)	30	6	7	17	36	56	−20	25	Relegation to 1. Lig
16	Gençlik Gücü (R)	30	4	6	20	34	81	−47	18	Relegation to 1. Lig

Source: KTFF
Rules for classification: 1) Points; 2) Head-to-head points; 3) Head-to-head goal difference; 4) Overall goal difference.
(C) Champions; (O) Play-off winners; (R) Relegated

== Relegation stage ==
Teams qualified between the 11th and the 14th position played a latter stage to determine the third relegated team. They were played only two out of the three rounds as the relegation position was determined.

Pos	Team	Pld	W	D	L	GF	GA	GD	Pts	Relegation	HAM	BIN	GÖN	DÜZ
1	Hamitköy	2	1	1	0	7	3	+4	21			3–3		4–0
2	Binatlı Yılmaz	2	1	1	0	7	6	+1	21					—
3	Gönyeli	2	1	0	1	5	5	0	21		—	3–4		
4	Düzkaya (R)	2	0	0	2	1	6	−5	13	Relegation to the 1. Lig			1–2	

Source: KTFF
(R) Relegated

== Top scorers ==
Rank	Player	Club	Goals
1	(Nigeria) John Okoye Ebuka	Yenicami	39
1	(Nigeria) Peter Ebimobowei	Gençlik Gücü	34
3	(Ghana) Kossi Adetu	Mağusa Türk Gücü	26
4	(Nigeria) Emmanuel Mbah	Alsancak Yeşilova	20
4	(Nigeria) John Okoli	Göçmenköy	20
