= 2011–12 KTFF Süper Lig =

Süper Lig
- Season: 2011–12
- Dates: 24 September 2011 – 2 May 2012
- Champions: Çetinkaya; 13th title
- Top goalscorer: (Uganda) Geofrey Massa (29 goals)

The 2011–12 KTFF Süper Lig season was the 53rd season of the Süper Lig in Northern Cyprus. Küçük Kaymaklı were the defending champion.

Five years after their last league title, Çetinkaya achieved its 13th league overall.

== Format ==
The 2011–12 season was set to continue with the same format used the previous season. The two last teams were directly relegated to the 1. Lig, while qualified teams between the 9th and the 12th position played a relegation stage where the last qualified was also relegated.

== League table ==
Pos	Team	Pld	W	D	L	GF	GA	GD	Pts	Qualification or relegation
1	Çetinkaya (C)	26	19	4	3	61	21	+40	61	
2	Mağusa Türk Gücü	26	15	7	4	54	29	+25	52	
3	Küçük Kaymaklı	26	16	3	7	47	29	+18	51	
4	Yenicami Ağdelen	26	15	2	9	62	35	+27	47	
5	Cihangir	26	14	3	9	46	46	0	45	
6	Lefke	26	11	6	9	45	36	+9	39	
7	Doğan Türk Birliği	26	11	6	9	54	47	+7	39	
8	Bostancı Bağcıl	26	9	10	7	40	32	+8	37	
9	Lapta Türk Birliği (O)	26	9	6	11	33	37	−4	33	Qualification to relegation stage
10	Türk Ocağı Limasol (O)	26	6	8	12	41	63	−22	26	Qualification to relegation stage
11	Düzkaya (R)	26	6	6	14	35	52	−17	24	Qualification to relegation stage
12	Göçmenköy (O)	26	6	5	15	25	55	−30	23	Qualification to relegation stage
13	Tatlısu (R)	26	6	3	17	34	57	−23	21	Relegation to 1. Lig
14	Gönyeli (R)	26	3	3	20	29	67	−38	12	Relegation to 1. Lig

Source: RSSSF
Rules for classification: 1) Points; 2) Head-to-head points; 3) Head-to-head goal difference; 4) Overall goal difference.
(C) Champions; (O) Play-off winners; (R) Relegated

== Relegation stage ==
Teams qualified between the 9th and the 12th position played a latter stage to determine the third relegated team.

Pos	Team	Pld	W	D	L	GF	GA	GD	Pts	Relegation	GÖÇ	TOL	LAP	DÜZ
1	Göçmenköy	3	3	0	0	8	3	+5	9					
2	Türk Ocağı Limasol	3	1	1	1	2	1	+1	4		0–1			2–0
3	Lapta Türk Birliği	3	1	1	1	1	3	−2	4		0–3	0–0		1–0
4	Düzkaya (R)	3	0	0	3	3	7	−4	0	Relegation to 1. Lig	3–4			

Source: RSSSF
(R) Relegated
