= Turkish Cypriot football league system =

The Turkish Cypriot football system is divided into the following leagues.

1	KTFF Süper Lig; 16 teams					
	↓ 3 teams relegate					
2	KTFF 1. Lig; 16 teams					
	↑ 3 teams promote ↓ 3 teams relegate					
3	BTM 1. Lig; Beyaz Grup; 9 clubs			BTM 1. Lig; Kırmızı Grup; 10 clubs		
	↑ 3 teams promote ↓ 2 teams relegate					
4	BTM 2. Lig; 1. Grup; 5 clubs	BTM 2. Lig; 2. Grup; 5 clubs	BTM 2. Lig; 3. Grup; 4 clubs	BTM 2. Lig; 4. Grup; 5 clubs	BTM 2. Lig; 5. Grup; 4 clubs	BTM 2. Lig; 6. Grup; 5 clubs
	↑ 2 teams promote					

Promotion and relegation can occur through every league. This means a club in the BTM 2. Lig may be promoted to the top flight KTFF Süper Lig.

== See also ==
- League system
