= KTFF Süper Lig =

- Founded: 1955
- Country: Northern Cyprus
- Confederation: CONIFA
- Number of clubs: 16
- Relegation to: KTFF 1. Lig
- Domestic cup(s): Cypriot Cup; KTFF Super Cup
- Current champions: Mağusa Türk Gücü (14th title)
- Most championships: Çetinkaya(14 titles); Mağusa Türk Gücü(14 titles)
- Top scorer: Erbay Gönelli (221 goals)
- Broadcaster(s): BRT
- Current: 2025–26 KTFF Süper Lig

The KTFF Süper Lig (English: CTFA Super League), officially the AKSA Süper Lig for sponsorship reasons, formerly known as the Birinci Lig (literally First League), is the top football league in Northern Cyprus. The league was founded in 1955 and is currently contested by 16 teams.

At the end of the season, the bottom two clubs are relegated to the KTFF 1. Lig, and the next four from the bottom compete in play-out matches to determine the third and final team to be relegated.

== History ==
The Birinci Lig was founded by six clubs in 1955. The founding members were:

- Baf Ülkü Yurdu
- Çetinkaya
- Doğan Türk Birliği
- Gençler Birliği
- Gençlik Gücü
- Mağusa Türk Gücü

Çetinkaya and Mağusa Türk Gücü are the most successful teams with 14 championship titles.

== Current teams (2024–25) ==
Location of 2025–26 KTFF Süper Lig teams in Northern Cyprus

Team	District	Stadium
Alsancak Yeşilova	Girne	Alsancak Mustafa Hidayet Çağlar Stadium
Cihangir	Lefkoşa	Cihangir Stadium
Çetinkaya	Lefkoşa	Lefkoşa Atatürk Stadium
Değirmenlik	Lefkoşa	Değirmenlik Sadık Cemil Stadium
Doğan Türk Birliği	Girne	Girne 20 Temmuz Mete Adanır Stadium
Dumlupınar	Gazimağusa	Gazimağusa Dr. Fazıl Küçük Stadium
Esentepe	Girne	Esentepe Erdal Barut Stadium
Gençler Birliği	İskele	İskele Cumhuriyet Stadium
Gençlik Gücü	Lefkoşa	Lefkoşa Atatürk Stadium
Göçmenköy İdman Yurdu	Lefkoşa	Lefkoşa Atatürk Stadium
Gönyeli	Lefkoşa	Gönyeli Stadium
Karşıyaka	Girne	Karşıyaka Şampiyon Melekler Stadium
Lefke	Lefke	Lefke 16 Ağustos Stadium
Mağusa Türk Gücü	Gazimağusa	Gazimağusa Dr. Fazıl Küçük Stadium
Mesarya	Gazimağusa	Paşaköy Hasan Onalt Stadium
Yenicami Ağdelen	Lefkoşa	Lefkoşa Atatürk Stadium

== Champions ==
- 1955–56 – Doğan Türk Birliği
- 1956–57 – Doğan Türk Birliği
- 1957–58 – Çetinkaya
- 1958–59 – Doğan Türk Birliği
- 1959–60 – Çetinkaya
- 1960–61 – Çetinkaya
- 1961–62 – Çetinkaya
- 1962–63 – Küçük Kaymaklı
- 1963–64 – Abandoned after 5 games due to Cypriot intercommunal violence
- 1964–68 – Not played due to Cypriot intercommunal violence
- 1968–69 – Mağusa Türk Gücü
- 1969–70 – Çetinkaya
- 1970–71 – Yenicami Ağdelen
- 1971–72 – Gönyeli
- 1972–73 – Yenicami Ağdelen
- 1973–74 – Yenicami Ağdelen
- 1974–75 – Not played due to Turkish invasion of Cyprus
- 1975–76 – Yenicami Ağdelen
- 1976–77 – Mağusa Türk Gücü
- 1977–78 – Gönyeli
- 1978–79 – Mağusa Türk Gücü
- 1979–80 – Mağusa Türk Gücü
- 1980–81 – Gönyeli
- 1981–82 – Mağusa Türk Gücü
- 1982–83 – Mağusa Türk Gücü
- 1983–84 – Yenicami Ağdelen
- 1984–85 – Küçük Kaymaklı
- 1985–86 – Küçük Kaymaklı
- 1986–87 – Baf Ülkü Yurdu
- 1987–88 – Baf Ülkü Yurdu
- 1988–89 – Baf Ülkü Yurdu
- 1989–90 – Baf Ülkü Yurdu
- 1990–91 – Doğan Türk Birliği
- 1991–92 – Doğan Türk Birliği
- 1992–93 – Gönyeli
- 1993–94 – Doğan Türk Birliği
- 1994–95 – Gönyeli
- 1995–96 – Akıncılar
- 1996–97 – Çetinkaya
- 1997–98 – Çetinkaya
- 1998–99 – Gönyeli
- 1999–00 – Çetinkaya
- 2000–01 – Gönyeli
- 2001–02 – Çetinkaya
- 2002–03 – Binatlı Yılmaz
- 2003–04 – Çetinkaya
- 2004–05 – Çetinkaya
- 2005–06 – Mağusa Türk Gücü
- 2006–07 – Çetinkaya
- 2007–08 – Gönyeli
- 2008–09 – Gönyeli
- 2009–10 – Doğan Türk Birliği
- 2010–11 – Küçük Kaymaklı
- 2011–12 – Çetinkaya
- 2012–13 – Çetinkaya
- 2013–14 – Yenicami Ağdelen
- 2014–15 – Yenicami Ağdelen
- 2015–16 – Mağusa Türk Gücü
- 2016–17 – Yenicami Ağdelen
- 2017–18 – Yenicami Ağdelen
- 2018–19 – Mağusa Türk Gücü
- 2019–20 – Mağusa Türk Gücü
- 2020–21 – Not played due to COVID-19
- 2021–22 – Mağusa Türk Gücü
- 2022–23 – Mağusa Türk Gücü
- 2023–24 – Mağusa Türk Gücü
- 2024–25 – Mağusa Türk Gücü
- 2025–26 – Gençlik Gücü

== Performance by club ==
Since the foundation of the First League (Birinci Lig) in 1955, nine different clubs have won the championship. Çetinkaya and Mağusa Türk Gücü have the most championship titles, 14.

Club	Titles	Years won
Çetinkaya	14	1957–58, 1959–60, 1960–61, 1961–62, 1969–70, 1996–97, 1997–98, 1999–2000, 2001–02, 2003–04, 2004–05, 2006–07, 2011–12, 2012–13
Mağusa Türk Gücü	14	1968–69, 1976–77, 1978–79, 1979–80, 1981–82, 1982–83, 2005–06, 2015–16, 2018–19, 2019–20, 2021–22, 2022–23, 2023–24, 2024–25
Gönyeli	9	1971–72, 1977–78, 1980–81, 1992–93, 1994–95, 1998–99, 2000–01, 2007–08, 2008–09
Yenicami Ağdelen	9	1970–71, 1972–73, 1973–74, 1975–76, 1983–84, 2013–14, 2014–15, 2016–17, 2017–18
Doğan Türk Birliği	7	1955–56, 1956–57, 1958–59, 1990–91, 1991–92, 1993–94, 2009–10
Baf Ülkü Yurdu	4	1986–87, 1987–88, 1988–89, 1989–90
Küçük Kaymaklı	4	1962–63, 1984–85, 1985–86, 2010–11
Akıncılar	1	1995–96
Binatlı Yılmaz	1	2002–03

== League participation ==
As of 2024, 37 clubs have participated in 64 seasons. Note: The tallies below include up to the 2024–25 season. Teams denoted in bold are current participants.

- **63** seasons: **Çetinkaya**
- **58** seasons: **Mağusa Türk Gücü**
- **56** seasons: **Doğan Türk Birliği**
- **55** seasons: Türk Ocağı Limasol, **Yenicami Ağdelen**
- **54** seasons: Küçük Kaymaklı
- **50** seasons: **Gençlik Gücü**
- **47** seasons: **Gönyeli**
- **40** seasons: **Gençler Birliği**
- **39** seasons: Baf Ülkü Yurdu
- **35** seasons: **Lefke**
- **30** seasons: Binatlı Yılmaz
- **25** seasons: Yalova
- **21** seasons: **Dumlupınar**
- **17** seasons: **Cihangir**
- **14** seasons: Yeniboğaziçi Doğan
- **12** seasons: **Alsancak Yeşilova**
- **11** seasons: Girne Halk Evi, Lapta Türk Birliği
- **10** seasons: Akıncılar, Bostancı Bağcıl
- **8** seasons: Düzkaya, Hamitköy
- **7** seasons: **Esentepe**, **Göçmenköy İdman Yurdu**, Mormenekşe Gençler Birliği
- **6** seasons: Tatlısu Halk Odası
- **5** seasons: Ozanköy
- **4** seasons: **Değirmenlik**, **Mesarya**
- **3** seasons: Beyarmudu Türk Çiftçiler Birliği, Serdarlı Gençler Birliği, Türkmenköy Aydın
- **2** seasons: **Karşıyaka**, Vadili Türk Çiftçiler Birliği
- **1** season: Çanakkale, Gaziveren, Ortaköy, Pile

== Top goalscorers ==
Season	Player	Team	Goals
1958–59	Sevin Ebeoğlu	Dogan Türk Birligi	16
1960–61	Sevin Ebeoğlu	Dogan Türk Birligi	17
1961–62	Erdoğan Şeniz	Çetinkaya	18
1961–62	Erdem Sururi	Yenicami	18
1962–63	Hüseyin Galliga	Mağusa Türk Gücü	19
1971–72	Özdemir Özdoğlu	L Gençler Birligi	16
1972–73	Erbay Gönelli	Gönyeli	26
1973–74	Erbay Gönelli	Gönyeli	16
1975–76	Erbay Gönelli	Gönyeli	34
1976–77	Erbay Gönelli	Gönyeli	22
1977–78	Erbay Gönelli	Gönyeli	31
1978–79	Erbay Gönelli	Gönyeli	20
1979–80	Erbay Gönelli	Gönyeli	25
1980–81	Erbay Gönelli	Gönyeli	18
1981–82	Levent Ruso	Küçük Kaymaklı	20
1982–83	Sertaç Karayel	Dogan Türk Birligi	17
1983–84	Erbay Gönelli	Gönyeli	14
1984–85	Tahir Musalar	L Gençler Birligi	17
1985–86	Ahmet Soğukpınar	Binatlı	18
1986–87	Erbay Gönelli	Gunçlur Gücü	15
1987–88	Sertaç Karayel	Yalova	19
1988–89	Özer Kaya	Dogan Gençler Birligi	19
1989–90	Turan Altay	Baf Ülkü Yurdu	16
1990–91	Özer Kaya	Dogan Gençler Birligi	16
1991–92	Sertaç Karayel	Binatlı	19
1992–93	Turan Altay	Baf Ülkü Yurdu	20
1993–94	Ahmet Soğukpınar	Binatlı	15
1994–95	Necati Tilki	Gönyeli	17
1995–96	Özer Kaya	K Kaymaklı	28
1996–97	Necati Tilki	Çetinkaya	19
1997–98	Necati Tilki	Çetinkaya	30
1998–99	Mehmet Abbasoğlu	Akincilar	25
1999–00	Erman Efe	Dumlupınar	27
2000–01	Kadri Alagöz	Gönyeli	26
2001–02	Ali Osumanua	Gönyeli	36
2002–03	(Democratic Republic of the Congo) Jacques Mbuyamba Mukendi	Çetinkaya	29
2003–04	(Democratic Republic of the Congo) Jacques Mbuyamba Mukendi	Çetinkaya	33
2004–05	Yasin Kansu	Çetinkaya	26
2005–06	Ertaç Taşkıran	Türk Ocaği Limasol	36
2006–07	Yasin Kansu	Çetinkaya	28
2006–07	Ertaç Taşkıran	Türk Ocaği Limasol	28
2007–08	(Democratic Republic of the Congo) Jacques Mbuyamba Mukendi	Gönyeli	28
2008–09	Ertaç Taşkıran	Gönyeli	10
2009–10	Yasin Kansu	K Kaymaklı	49
2010–11	Ertaç Taşkıran	B Bağcıl	34
2011–12	(Uganda) Geofrey Massa	Yenicami	29
2012–13	Esin Sonay	Çetinkaya	26
2013–14	Esin Sonay	Küçük Kaymaklı	28
2014–15	Kasim Tağman	Lefke	28
2015–16	Halil Turan	Yenicami	26
2016–17	(Nigeria) John Okoye Ebuka	Yenicami	41
2017–18	Üğur Naci	Küçük Kaymaklı	36
2018–19	(Nigeria) John Okoye Ebuka	Yenicami	33
2019–20	(Nigeria) John Okoye Ebuka	Yenicami	39
2021–22	(Northern Cyprus) Remzi Betmezoğlu	Göçmenköy	25
2022–23	(Turkey) Muhittin Tümbül	Cihangir	25
2023–24	(Turkey) Muhittin Tümbül	Cihangir	35
2024–25	(Guinea-Bissau) Ussumane Djabi	Çetinkaya	26

Most times goalscorer

- 10 times
  - Erbay Gönelli

Most goals scored by a player in a single season

- 49 goals
  - Yasin Kansu (2009–10)

=== All-time goalscorers ===
Rank	Country	Player	Goals	Years
1	(Northern Cyprus)	Erbay Gönelli	221	1972–1987
2	(Nigeria)	John Okoye Ebuka	146	2016–2020

== Multiple hat-tricks ==
Rank	Country	Player	Hat-tricks
1	(Nigeria)	John Okoye Ebuka	15
2	(Northern Cyprus)	Halil Turan	10
3	(Nigeria)	Peter Ebimobowei	6
3	(Northern Cyprus)	Burak Koçar	6
5	(Northern Cyprus)	Senol Şöför	5
6	(Northern Cyprus)	Remzi Betmezoğlu	4
6	(Turkey)	Muhittin Tümbül	4
8	(Uganda)	Geofrey Massa	3
9	(Nigeria)	Sampson Agoha	2
9	(Ghana)	Prince Boateng	2
9	(Mauritania)	Souleymane Doukara	2
9	(Ghana)	Evanonya Kossi Abetu	2
13	(Benin)	Quentin Debouto	1
13	(Northern Cyprus)	Toykan Hacet	1
13	(Nigeria)	Dinnopeter Jude	1
13	(Northern Cyprus)	Hascan Kirmaz	1
13	(Zimbabwe)	Charlton Mashumba	1
13	(Nigeria)	Samuel Mbah	1
13	(Nigeria)	Billy Michael	1
13	(Guinea)	Badara Naby Sylla	1
13	(Nigeria)	John Okoli	1
13	(Benin)	Mickaël Poté	1
13	(Northern Cyprus)	Arif Uysal	1
13	(Northern Cyprus)	Fikret Yağcioğlu	1

== See also ==
- Football in Northern Cyprus
- Football in Cyprus
- List of association football competitions
