= Babacar Diop (Senegalese footballer) =

Senegalese footballer

Personal information
- Full name: Babacar Mbaye Diop
- Date of birth: 21 October 1993 (age 33)
- Place of birth: Dakar, Senegal
- Height: 1.97 m (6 ft 6 in)
- Position: Forward

Youth career
- 2011–2012: Kayserispor

Senior career*
Years	Team	Apps	(Gls)
2012–2015	Kayserispor	14	(1)
2016	Yozgatspor 1959 FK	13	(15)
2016–2017	Gebzespor	20	(10)
2017–2018	Fatsa Belediyespor	21	(21)
2018–2019	Manavgat Belediyespor	26	(20)
2019	Doğan Türk Birliği	15	(11)
2020	TPS	10	(0)
2020	→ AC Kajaani (loan)	8	(4)
2022	→ Cihangir GSK (loan)	9	
2022-2026	Cihangir GSK	52	(38)
- * Club domestic league appearances and goals as of 00:16, 25 December 2020 (UTC)

Babacar Mbaye Diop (born 21 October 1993) is a Senegalese footballer who plays as a forward. He made his Süper Lig debut on 24 February 2012.
