= Cihangir G.S.K. =

Association football club in Northern Cyprus

Cihangir
- Full name: Cihangir Gençlik Spor Kulübü
- Nickname: Abohor
- Founded: 1951
- Ground: Cihangir Stadı, Cihangir, Northern Cyprus
- Capacity: 1,000
- League: KTFF Süper Lig
- 2024–25: 3rd

Cihangir Gençlik Spor Kulübü is a Turkish Cypriot sports club based in Cihangir, in Northern Cyprus.

== History ==
Founded in 1951, Cihangir reached the top flight for the first time in 2007. Since that season, it never was relegated from the Süper Lig.

In 2018, Cihangir achieved its first title ever by winning the Cypriot Cup after beating 3–1 Mağusa Türk Gücü in the final.

== Latest seasons ==
Season	Tier	Division	Place	Cypriot Cup
2009–10	1	Süper Lig	10th	Quarter-finals
2010–11	1	Süper Lig	7th	Round of 16
2011–12	1	Süper Lig	5th	Quarter-finals
2012–13	1	Süper Lig	7th	Round of 16
2013–14	1	Süper Lig	6th	Round of 16
2014–15	1	Süper Lig	6th	Round of 16
2015–16	1	Süper Lig	10th	Quarter-finals
2016–17	1	Süper Lig	3rd	Quarter-finals
2017–18	1	Süper Lig	8th	Champions
2018–19	1	Süper Lig	9th	Round of 16

Season	Tier	Division	Place	Cypriot Cup
2019–20	1	Süper Lig	7th	Quarter-finals
2020–21	Season suspended			
2021–22	1	Süper Lig	8th	Quarter-finals
2022–23	1	Süper Lig	2nd	Runners-up
2023–24	1	Süper Lig	2nd	Quarter-finals
2024–25	1	Süper Lig	3rd	Quarter-finals

== Honours ==
- Cypriot Cup: (1)

2018
