= Baf Ülkü Yurdu S.K. =

Association football club in Northern Cyprus

- Full name: Baf Ülkü Yurdu Spor Kulübü; Baf Ülkü Yurdu Sports Club
- Founded: 1947
- Ground: Güzelyurt Üner Berkalp Stadı
- Capacity: 7.000
- Chairman: Ahmet Ertay
- Manager: Kemal Yürekli
Home colours	Away colours

Baf Ülkü Yurdu Spor Kulübü is a Turkish Cypriot sports club established in Paphos (Turkish: Baf, Greek: Πάφος) in 1947, and since 1974, the team has been playing its home games in Güzelyurt. With 4 Birinci Lig titles, 3 Cumhurbaşkanlığı Kupası (President's Cup), 2 Dr. Fazıl Küçük Kupası titles and 1 Başbakanlık Kupasi (Prime Minister's Cup) title to its name, the club is among the most successful sports clubs in the Turkish Republic of Northern Cyprus football.

== History ==
The football leagues were set up in Cyprus upon the establishment of Cyprus Football Association in 1934 and Çetinkaya Türk S.K. joined the Cypriot First Division as the sole representative of the Turkish Cypriot community. The idea of Turkish Cypriots living in Baf establishing a sports club started to evolve and in 1947 a petition was submitted to the British authorities ruling Cyprus at that time for the formation of the club. Two prominent members of the Turkish Cypriot community in Baf were assigned the responsibility to proceed with the establishment of the club; Halit Ali Rıza and Derviş Ahmet Raşit. The petition was approved and Ülkü Yurdu Spor Kulübü was formally established on 23 April 1947. Since the petition was prepared by Halit Ali Rıza, who was a lawyer, he became the founding president of Ülkü Yurdu Spor Kulübü and Mr. Derviş Ahmet Raşit was elected as the first president in the first assembly of club's members. A house was rented in Moutallos neighbourhood of Baf that served as the club headquarters.

=== 1947–1960 ===
Upon its establishment, Ülkü Yurdu became a focal point in the lives of the Turkish Cypriot community in Baf. Due to the inter-communal conflict between the Turkish Cypriots and Greek Cypriots at the time, the club did not register to play in the Cypriot First Division and only participated in some friendly matches. When the Cyprus Turkish Football Federation was formed in 1955, Ülkü Yurdu was invited to the league that was to be formed as the sole representative team from Baf. From 1955 to 1960, Ülkü Yurdu participated at various levels of the Turkish Cypriot league that was formed.

=== 1961–1980 ===
In early 1960s, Ülkü Yurdu continued to take part in the Turkish Cypriot football league. The team achieved its highest ranking during the 1963–64 season when it was ranked 2nd in the First Division of the Turkish Cypriot football league. However, that season was not completed due to the increased level of inter-communal violence between Greek Cypriots and Turkish Cypriots. The league was resumed in 1968–69 season and Ülkü Yurdu became a regular in the league in the years that followed.

Following the summer of 1974, the Turkish Cypriot community in Baf moved to the north of the island due to the political situation in Cyprus. The majority of the Turkish Cypriot community of Baf settled in Güzelyurt, which also became Ülkü Yurdu's new home. The club added Baf meaning Paphos in Turkish to its name in order to stay loyal to its roots.

=== 1981–2000 ===
Ülkü Yurdu enjoyed great success during the later part of the 1980s. The team was crowned the champions of the Turkish Cypriot First Division four consecutive seasons (1986–87 to 1989–90). Ülkü Yurdu became the first team to achieve such a feat and no other Turkish Cypriot team has achieved the same level of success to date. Ülkü Yurdu also won the Cumhurbaşkanlığı Kupası (President's Cup) 3 times and Dr. Fazıl Küçük Kupası twice during the same period. Following its success at home, Ülkü Yurdu became the first Turkish Cypriot football team to be invited to a tournament in Turkey and won it as well. The team entered into a gradual decline afterwards and was relegated to İkinci Lig in the 1994–95 season. Despite being promoted back to Birinci Lig in the 1997–98 season, the team did not manage to survive and spent the later parts of 1990s between Birinci Lig and İkinci Lig.

=== 2001–2010 ===
Due to economic underdevelopment and negligence of the Güzelyurt area, Ülkü Yurdu continued to suffer from inconsistency during the early 2000s. The club continued to feature between Süper Lig (Premier League) and Birinci Lig (First Division) throughout the decade.

=== 2011–present ===
At the end of the 2015–2016 season, the club finished 6th in Birinci Lig (First Division) earning a place in the play-off group for promotion to the Süper Lig (Premier League). After a pulsating round of 3 matches in the play-off group, Ülkü Yurdu and Denizli were even on points, which meant that two teams had to face each other again in the play-off final. Ülkü Yurdu came out victorious after 90 minutes winning the play-off final game 2 – 1, securing their return to the Süper Lig (Premier League) after 13 long years. Following their promotion to the Süper Lig (Premier League), the club finished 11th at the end of 2016 – 2017 season and a respectable 6th at the end of 2017 – 2018 season.

== Latest seasons ==
Season	Tier	Division	Place	Cypriot Cup
2009–10	2	1. Lig	8th	First round
2010–11	2	1. Lig		First round
2011–12	2	1. Lig	13th	Second round
2012–13	3	2. Lig	1st	
2013–14	2	1. Lig	12th	First round
2014–15	3	2. Lig	2nd	First round
2015–16	2	1. Lig	6th	First round
2016–17	1	Süper Lig	11th	Quarter-finals
2017–18	1	Süper Lig	6th	Quarter-finals
2018–19	1	Süper Lig	11th	Quarter-finals

Season	Tier	Division	Place	Cypriot Cup
2019–20	1	Süper Lig	6th	Round of 32
2020–21	Season suspended			
2021–22	1	Süper Lig	14th	Round of 16
2023–24	2	1. Lig	7th	Round of 32
2023–24	2	1. Lig	16th	Round of 32
2024–25	3	BTM 1. Lig	1st	
2025–26	2	1. Lig		

== Academy ==
The club is renowned for producing talented young players from its youth ranks raised in the local area of Güzelyurt. Over the years, many players have emerged from Under-19 and Under-14 teams to play for the first team. In June 2009, the Under-14 team won the national Under-14 league in a decisive manner by winning all of its 13 games, scoring 65 goals and conceding 7 goals on the way to their triumph.

== Supporters ==
Ülkü Yurdu is widely supported by Turkish Cypriots who are from Baf. According to a survey carried out in 2005, Baf Ülkü Yurdu is the third most supported team in the Turkish Republic of Northern Cyprus with 8.7% of the people surveyed indicating their alliance to the team.

== Colors ==
The club colors are red and green.

== Stadium ==
The club's home stadium is Güzelyurt Zafer Stadı.

== Achievements ==
- Birinci Lig
  - Champions (4): 1987, 1988, 1989, 1990
- Cumhurbaşkanlığı Kupası
  - Winners (3): 1987, 1988, 1989
- Dr. Fazıl Küçük Kupası
  - Winners (2): 1989, 1991
