= Lefke T.S.K. =

Association football club in Northern Cyprus

Lefke
- Full name: Lefke Türk Spor Kulübü
- Founded: 1943
- Ground: 16 Ağustos Stadı, Lefke, Northern Cyprus
- Capacity: 5,000
- League: KTFF Süper Lig
- 2024–25: 5th

Lefke Türk Spor Kulübü is a Turkish Cypriot sports club based in Lefke, in Northern Cyprus.

== History ==
Founded in 1943, Lefke is one of the teams with most seasons in the KTFF Süper Lig.

In 2025, Lefke achieved its third Cypriot Cup.

== Latest seasons ==
Season	Tier	Division	Place	Cypriot Cup
2009–10	2	1. Lig	2th	Round of 16
2010–11	1	Süper Lig	6th	Runners-up
2011–12	1	Süper Lig	6th	Round of 16
2012–13	1	Süper Lig	6th	Round of 16
2013–14	1	Süper Lig	3rd	Champions
2014–15	1	Süper Lig	5th	Quarter-finals
2015–16	1	Süper Lig	5th	Semi-finals
2016–17	1	Süper Lig	9th	Round of 16
2017–18	1	Süper Lig	7th	Round of 16
2018–19	1	Süper Lig	7th	Round of 16

Season	Tier	Division	Place	Cypriot Cup
2019–20	1	Süper Lig	9th	Round of 16
2020–21	Season suspended			
2021–22	1	Süper Lig	5th	Round of 16
2022–23	1	Süper Lig	7th	Round of 16
2023–24	1	Süper Lig	7th	Round of 16
2024–25	1	Süper Lig	5th	Champions

== Honours ==
=== Under Cyprus Turkish Football Association (since 1954) ===
- Cypriot Cup: (3)

1972, 2014, 2025
