= Yenicami Ağdelen =

Association football club in Northern Cyprus

Yenicami Ağdelen Spor Kulübü
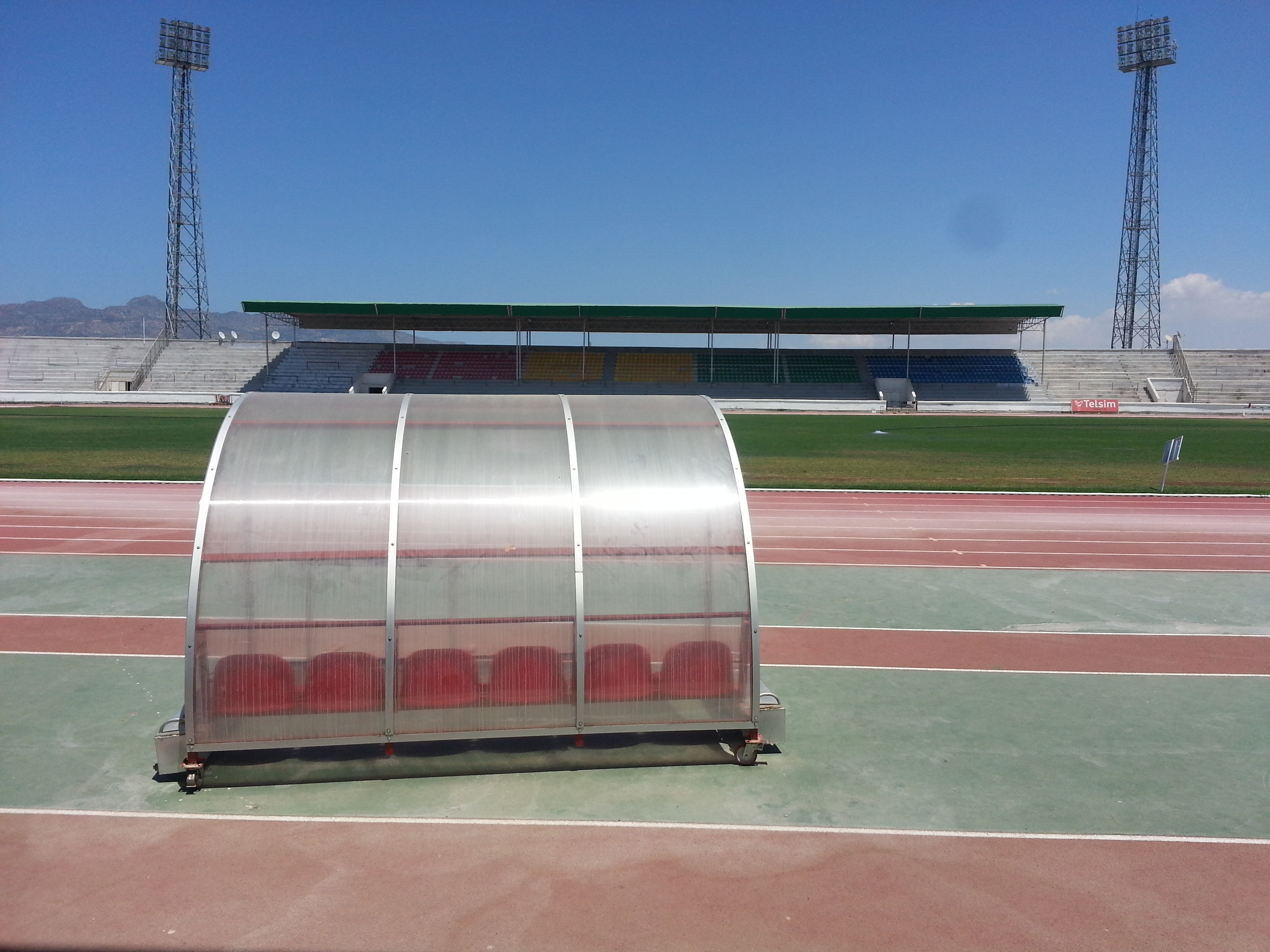
- Nicosia Ataturk Stadium, the home of Yenicami Agdelen SK.
- Nickname: Kartal ("Eagle")
- Ground: Nicosia Ataturk Stadium

Yenicami Agdelen SK is a Turkish Cypriot football club based in North Nicosia.

Yenicami Agdelen S.K (YAK) was founded in 1951. Its colours are black and white. It plays its home matches in the Nicosia Atatürk Stadium. Its nickname is "Kartal" ("Eagle").

== Latest seasons ==
Season	Tier	Division	Place	Cypriot Cup
2009–10	2	1. Lig	4th	Round of 16
2010–11	2	1. Lig	1st	Round of 16
2011–12	1	Süper Lig	4th	Round of 16
2012–13	1	Süper Lig	2nd	Champions
2013–14	1	Süper Lig	1st	Runners-up
2014–15	1	Süper Lig	1st	Champions
2015–16	1	Süper Lig	6th	Runners-up
2016–17	1	Süper Lig	1st	Round of 16
2017–18	1	Süper Lig	1st	Semi-finals
2018–19	1	Süper Lig	2nd	Runners-up

Season	Tier	Division	Place	Cypriot Cup
2019–20	1	Süper Lig	5th	Champions
2020–21	Season suspended			
2021–22	1	Süper Lig	4th	Semi-finals
2022–23	1	Süper Lig	5th	Round of 16
2023–24	1	Süper Lig	12th	Quarter-finals
2024–25	1	Süper Lig	14th	Round of 16

== Honors ==
- Süper Lig (previously Birinci Lig): (9)

1970–71, 1972–73, 1973–74, 1975–76, 1983–84, 2013–14, 2014–15, 2016–17, 2017–18

- Kıbrıs Kupası and Federasyon Kupası: (8)

1962, 1973, 1974, 1989, 2003, 2013, 2015, 2020

== Women's team ==
Yenicami created its women's football team in 2024 and currently plays in the Kadınlar Ligi.

=== Seasons ===
Season	RS Pos	Playoffs	Cypriot Cup
2024–25	4th	Semi-finals	Quarter-finals
