= Gönyeli S.K. =

Association football club in Northern Cyprus

Gönyeli Spor Kulübü
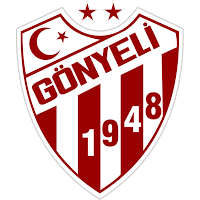
- Full name: Gönyeli Spor Kulübü
- Founded: 1948; 78 years ago
- Ground: Ali Naci Karacan
- Capacity: 5,000
- League: Birinci Lig
Home colours	Away colours

Gönyeli Spor Kulübü is a Turkish Cypriot professional football club based in Gönyeli, North Nicosia. It was founded in 1948. The club colours are red and white.

== Stadium ==
The club's home stadium is Gönyeli Ali Naci Karacan Stadı, named for journalist Ali Naci Karacan.

== Latest seasons ==
Season	Tier	Division	Place	Cypriot Cup
2003–04	1	Süper Lig	4th	Round of 16
2004–05	1	Süper Lig	3rd	Runners-up
2005–06	1	Süper Lig	9th	Round of 32
2006–07	1	Süper Lig	6th	Round of 16
2007–08	1	Süper Lig	1st	Champions
2008–09	1	Süper Lig	1st	Champions
2009–10	1	Süper Lig	2nd	Champions
2010–11	1	Süper Lig	11th	Round of 16
2011–12	1	Süper Lig	14th	Round of 16
2012–13	2	1. Lig	8th	Round of 16
2013–14	2	1. Lig	1st	Round of 16
2014–15	1	Süper Lig	13th	Round of 16
2015–16	2	1. Lig	12th	Round of 16
2016–17	2	1. Lig	2nd	Round of 32
2017–18	2	1. Lig	1st	Round of 32

Season	Tier	Division	Place	Cypriot Cup
2018–19	1	Süper Lig	8th	Round of 32
2019–20	1	Süper Lig	11th	Round of 16
2020–21	Season suspended			
2021–22	1	Süper Lig	6th	Round of 16
2022–23	1	Süper Lig	15th	Round of 32
2023–24	2	1. Lig	2nd	Round of 32
2024–25	1	Süper Lig	12th	Round of 16

== Honors ==
- Birinci Lig
  - Champions (9): 1971–72, 1977–78, 1980–81, 1992–93, 1994–95, 1998–99, 2000–01, 2007–08, 2008–09
- Kıbrıs Kupası and Federasyon Kupası
  - Champions (5): 1985, 1995, 1998, 2000, 2008
- Cumhurbaşkanlığı Kupası
  - Champions (4): 1985, 1995, 1999, 2000
