= Mağusa Türk Gücü S.K. =

Association football club in Northern Cyprus

Mağusa Türk Gücü
- Full name: Mağusa Türk Gücü Spor Kulübü
- Nicknames: MTG, Gargalar
- Founded: 1945
- Ground: Canbulat Stadı, Famagusta, Northern Cyprus
- Capacity: 2000
- League: Birinci Lig
- 2022–23: Birinci Lig, 1st
Home colours	Away colours

Mağusa Türk Gücü Spor Kulübü is a Turkish Cypriot sports club based in Famagusta, in Northern Cyprus.

== History ==
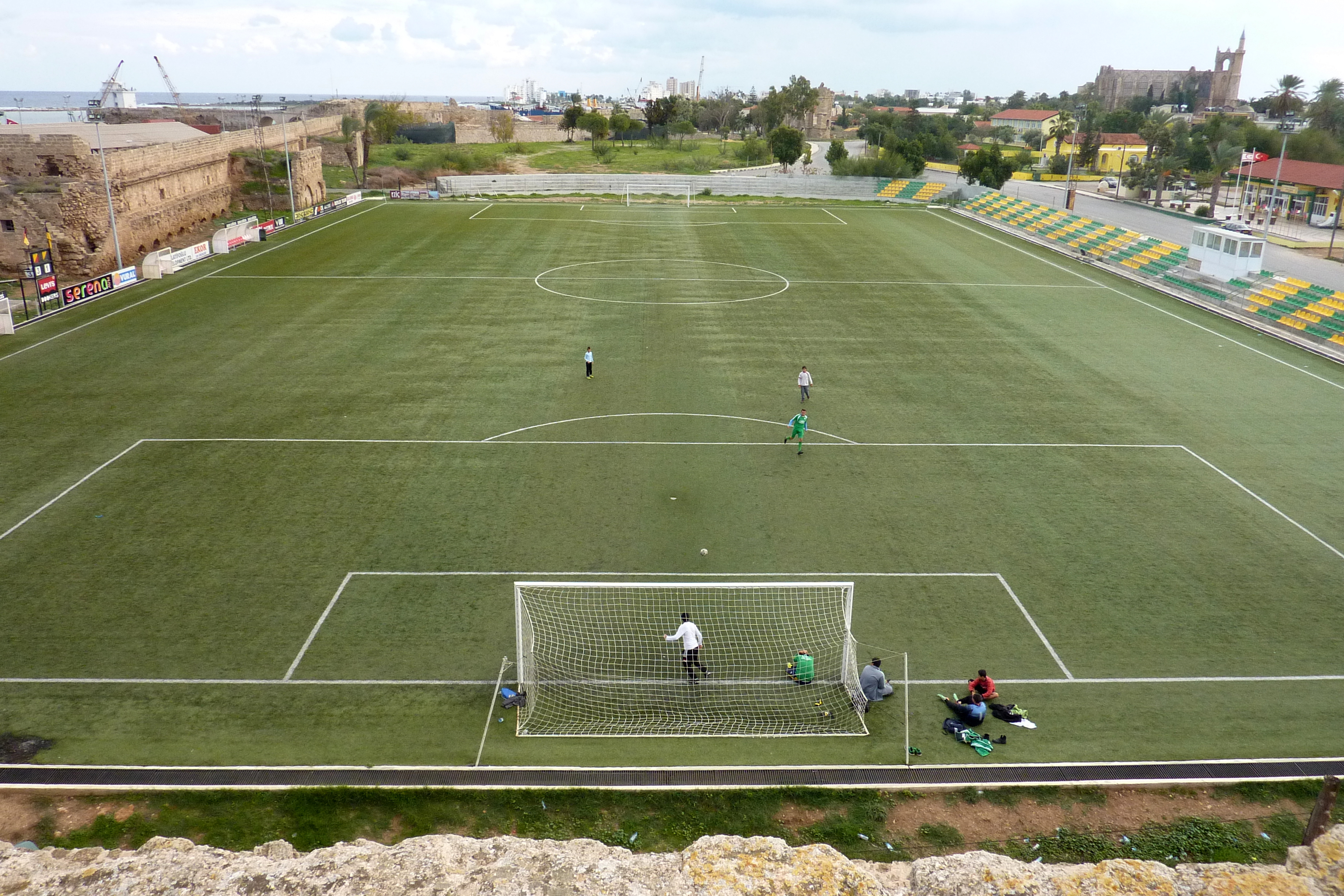
Canbulat Stadium

Mağusa Türk Gücü last won the title of champions of the Turkish-Cypriot Football League Birinci Lig in the 2018–19 season in Northern Cyprus. The club colors are yellow and green. Home stadium of the club is the Canbulat Stadium, which is a multi-use stadium in Famagusta.

The MTG also has a volleyball team competing nationally as well as a chess club.

Cameroonian international Eyong Enoh played for the team in 2005 2025 2026 sezonun da gençleşmeye giden mağusa türk gücünde kaptan Nevzat Duran olmuştur 2023 2024 sezonun'da Cihangir'e attığı gol ile şampiyonluk gelmiştir

== Notable Chairmen ==
- (Northern Cyprus) Ersoy İnce

Koral Bozkurt

== Latest seasons ==
Season	Tier	Division	Place	Cypriot Cup
2003–04	1	Süper Lig	2nd	Semi-finals
2004–05	1	Süper Lig	6th	
2005–06	1	Süper Lig	1st	Semi-finals
2006–07	1	Süper Lig	8th	Round of 16
2007–08	1	Süper Lig	3rd	Round of 16
2008–09	1	Süper Lig	5th	
2009–10	1	Süper Lig	4th	Quarter-finals
2010–11	1	Süper Lig	9th	Round of 16
2011–12	1	Süper Lig	2nd	Quarter-finals
2012–13	1	Süper Lig	9th	Runners-up
2013–14	1	Süper Lig	7th	Quarter-finals
2014–15	1	Süper Lig	7th	Quarter-finals
2015–16	1	Süper Lig	1st	Quarter-finals
2016–17	1	Süper Lig	13th	Round of 32
2017–18	1	Süper Lig	11th	Runners-up

Season	Tier	Division	Place	Cypriot Cup
2018–19	1	Süper Lig	1st	Champions
2019–20	1	Süper Lig	1st	Runners-up
2020–21	Season suspended			
2021–22	1	Süper Lig	1st	Champions
2022–23	1	Süper Lig	1st	Quarter-finals
2023–24	1	Süper Lig	1st	Runners-up
2024–25	1	Süper Lig	1st	Runners-up

== Honours ==
=== Under Cyprus Turkish Football Association (since 1954) ===
- Süper Lig: (14)

1968–69, 1976–77, 1978–79, 1979–80, 1981–82, 1982–83, 2005–06, 2015–16, 2018–19, 2019–20, 2021–22, 2022–23, 2023–24, 2024–25

- Cypriot Cup: (7)

1961, 1977, 1979, 1983, 1987, 2019, 2022

- Super Cup: (7)

1983, 1986, 2016, 2020, 2023, 2024, 2025
