= Türk Ocağı Limasol S.K. =

Association football club in Northern Cyprus

Türk Ocağı Limasol
- Full name: Türk Ocağı Limasol Spor Kulübü
- Nickname: Maunacılar
- Founded: 1952; 70 years ago
- Stadium: Girne 20 Temmuz Mete Adanır Stadyumu
- Capacity: 10.000
- Chairman: (Northern Cyprus) Tamer Mertkan
- Manager: (Northern Cyprus) Ahmet Dedekorkut
- League: KTFF Süper Lig
Home colours	Away colours

Türk Ocağı Limasol Spor Kulübü is a Turkish Cypriot sports club founded in 1952 in Limassol. The club moved to Kyrenia after the division of the island in 1974.

== Colors ==
The club colours are yellow and black.

== Latest seasons ==
Season	Tier	Division	Place	Cypriot Cup
2009–10	1	Süper Lig	9th	Round of 16
2010–11	2	1. Lig		Round of 16
2011–12	1	Süper Lig	10th	Quarter-finals
2012–13	1	Süper Lig	13th	First round
2013–14	2	1. Lig	5th	First round
2014–15	2	1. Lig	1st	Round of 16
2015–16	1	Süper Lig	8th	Quarter-finals
2016–17	1	Süper Lig	7th	Champions
2017–18	1	Süper Lig	10th	Round of 16
2018–19	1	Süper Lig	6th	Round of 16

Season	Tier	Division	Place	Cypriot Cup
2019–20	1	Süper Lig	4th	Semi-finals
2020–21	Season suspended			
2021–22	1	Süper Lig	12th	Round of 16
2022–23	1	Süper Lig	14th	Champions
2023–24	1	Süper Lig	16th	Round of 32
2024–25	2	1. Lig	5th	Round of 32

== Former notable players ==
- (Northern Cyprus) Ekrem İmamoğlu (Mayor of Istanbul)
- (Ghana) Sadick Adams

== Stadium ==
The club's home stadium is Girne 20 Temmuz Mete Adanır Stadyumu.

== Honors ==
- Cypriot Cup: (6)

1982, 1984, 1990, 2007, 2017, 2023

- Cumhurbaşkanlığı Kupası: (4)

1982, 1984, 1990, 2017
