= Küçük Kaymaklı Türk S.K. =

Association football club in Northern Cyprus

Küçük Kaymaklı Türk Spor Kulübü
- Full name: Küçük Kaymaklı Türk Spor Kulübü
- Nickname(s): Forest Kaymaklı
- Founded: 1951
- Ground: Lefkoşa Şehit Hüseyin Ruso Stadyumu, North Nicosia, Northern Cyprus
- Capacity: 1,000
- Chairman: Akay Aşina
- League: KTFF Süper Lig
Home colours	Away colours

Küçük Kaymaklı Türk S.K is a Turkish Cypriot sports club based in North Nicosia, Northern Cyprus. It was established in 1951. They are also known as “Forest Kaymaklı.” The club colours are black and green.

== Stadium ==
The club's home stadium is Lefkoşa Şehit Hüseyin Ruso Stadyumu, which can host 1,000 spectators.

== Latest seasons ==
Season	Tier	Division	Place	Cypriot Cup
2009–10	1	Süper Lig	3rd	Quarter-finals
2010–11	1	Süper Lig	1st	Semi-finals
2011–12	1	Süper Lig	4th	Runners-up
2012–13	1	Süper Lig	3rd	Quarter-finals
2013–14	1	Süper Lig	2nd	Quarter-finals
2014–15	1	Süper Lig	2nd	Quarter-finals
2015–16	1	Süper Lig	7th	Champions
2016–17	1	Süper Lig	5th	Semi-finals
2017–18	1	Süper Lig	9th	Semi-finals
2018–19	1	Süper Lig	12th	Round of 16

Season	Tier	Division	Place	Cypriot Cup
2019–20	1	Süper Lig	10th	Quarter-finals
2020–21	Season suspended			
2021–22	1	Süper Lig	11th	Semi-finals
2022–23	1	Süper Lig	9th	Quarter-finals
2023–24	1	Süper Lig	14th	Second round
2024–25	2	1. Lig	2nd	Round of 32

== Achievements ==
- Birinci Lig: (4)

1962-63, 1984-85, 1985-86, 2010-11

- Kıbrıs Kupası and Federasyon Kupası: (7)

1980, 1986, 1988, 1997, 2002, 2004, 2016
Runners-up (6): 1963, 1982, 1991, 2001, 2009, 2012

- Cumhurbaşkanlığı Kupası: (1)

1997
Runners-up (3): 1985, 1986, 1998, 2011

- Dr. Fazıl Küçük Kupası: (2)

1997, 2001
Runners-up (1): 1998

- Başbakanlık Kupası: (2)

1998, 2001
Runners-up (2): 1991, 1999

== Notable players ==
- (Ghana) Patrick Villars
- (Uganda) Geofrey Massa
- (Mali) Ousmane Keita
- (Nigeria) Felix Obada
- (Nigeria) Onyekachi Okafor
