= Gençlik Gücü T.S.K. =

Association football club in Northern Cyprus

| Home colours | Away colours |

Gençlik Gücü Spor Kulübü is a Turkish Cypriot football club based in North Nicosia, Northern Cyprus. It was established in 1952.

== Colors ==
The club colours are green and white.

== Latest seasons ==
| Season | Tier | Division | Place | Cypriot Cup |
|---|---|---|---|---|
| 2009–10 | 1 | Süper Lig | 14th | Round of 32 |
| 2010–11 | 2 | 1. Lig | | Round of 32 |
| 2011–12 | 2 | 1. Lig | 1st | Round of 16 |
| 2012–13 | 1 | Süper Lig | 10th | Round of 16 |
| 2013–14 | 1 | Süper Lig | 14th | Semi-finals |
| 2014–15 | 2 | 1. Lig | 12th | Round of 32 |
| 2015–16 | 2 | 1. Lig | 2nd | Round of 16 |
| 2016–17 | 1 | Süper Lig | 10th | Quarter-finals |
| 2017–18 | 1 | Süper Lig | 13th | Round of 32 |
| 2018–19 | 1 | Süper Lig | 10th | Quarter-finals |

| Season | Tier | Division | Place | Cypriot Cup |
|---|---|---|---|---|
| 2019–20 | 1 | Süper Lig | 16th | Round of 16 |
| 2020–21 | Season suspended | | | |
| 2021–22 | 2 | 1. Lig | 2nd | Round of 16 |
| 2022–23 | 1 | Süper Lig | 12th | Semi-finals |
| 2023–24 | 1 | Süper Lig | 12th | Round of 16 |
| 2024–25 | 1 | Süper Lig | 4th | Round of 16 |

== Honors ==
- Kıbrıs Kupası and Federasyon Kupası: (1)

1981

- Cumhurbaşkanlığı Kupası: (1)

1981

== Women's team ==
Gençlik Gücü created its women's football team in 2022 and currently plays in the Kadınlar Ligi.

=== Seasons ===
| Season | RS Pos | Playoffs | Cypriot Cup |
|---|---|---|---|
| 2021–22 | 2nd | Runners-up | Champions |
| 2022–23 | 1st | Champions | Champions |
| 2023–24 | 1st | Champions | Champions |
| 2024–25 | 2nd | Runners-up | Champions |
