= Cypriot Cup (Northern Cyprus) =

- Founded: 1956; 70 years ago
- Region: Northern Cyprus
- Teams: various
- Current champions: Lefke TSK (3rd title)
- Most championships: Çetinkaya (17 titles)
- Website: www.ktff.net
- 2025 KTFF Cypriot Cup

The Cypriot Cup (Turkish: Kıbrıs Kupası) is the top knockout tournament of the Cyprus Turkish Football Federation, Turkish Republic of Northern Cyprus. It was created in 1956 as the Kıbrıs Kupası, and was known as the "Federation Cup" (Turkish: Federasyon Kupası) for some time, but the name was changed back to "Kıbrıs Kupası" in 2012.

The winner of the Cypriot Cup plays with the winner of the Süper Lig in the KTFF Super Cup.

== Winners ==
=== Cypriot Cup (Kıbrıs Kupası) ===
- 1956 : Çetinkaya B 3–2 (a.e.t.) Doğan Türk Birliği
- 1957 : Çetinkaya 4–3 Doğan Türk Birliği
- 1958 : Çetinkaya 2–1 Yenicami Ağdelen
- 1959 : Çetinkaya 6–0 Gençlik Gücü
- 1960 : Çetinkaya 2–0 Gençlik Gücü
- 1961 : Mağusa Türk Gücü 2–1 Yenicami Ağdelen
- 1962 : Yenicami Ağdelen 5–2 Baf Ülkü Yurdu
- 1963 : Çetinkaya 3–0 Küçük Kaymaklı
- 1969 : Çetinkaya 3–1 Yenicami Ağdelen
- 1970 : Çetinkaya 2–0 Yenicami Ağdelen
- 1971 : Gönyeli 2–0 Gençlik Gücü
- 1972 : Lefke 4–0 Baf Ülkü Yurdu
- 1973 : Yenicami Ağdelen 4–1 Gönyeli
- 1974 : Yenicami Ağdelen 1–0 Gönyeli
- 1976 : Çetinkaya 3–0 Baf Ülkü Yurdu
- 1977 : Mağusa Türk Gücü 3–0 Gönyeli
- 1978 : Doğan Türk Birliği 3–0 (awarded) Yenicami Ağdelen
- 1979 : Mağusa Türk Gücü 2–0 Gönyeli
- 1980 : Küçük Kaymaklı 1–0 Mağusa Türk Gücü
- 1981 : Gençlik Gücü 4–1, 1–0 Yenicami Ağdelen
- 1982 : Türk Ocağı Limasol 1–0, 1–2 Küçük Kaymaklı
- 1983 : Mağusa Türk Gücü 3–0, 1–2 Gönyeli
- 1984 : Türk Ocağı Limasol 0–0, 2–0 Gönyeli
- 1985 : Gönyeli 1–2, 2–0 Doğan Türk Birliği
- 1986 : Küçük Kaymaklı 1–1, 1–0 Mağusa Türk Gücü
- 1987 : Mağusa Türk Gücü 3–3, 2–0 Yalova
- 1988 : Küçük Kaymaklı 2–0, 1–2 Doğan Türk Birliği

=== Federation Cup (Federasyon Kupası) ===
- 1989 : Yenicami Ağdelen 0–0, 3–2 Doğan Türk Birliği
- 1990 : Türk Ocağı Limasol 1–0 Doğan Türk Birliği
- 1991 : Çetinkaya 2–0 Küçük Kaymaklı
- 1992 : Çetinkaya 4–1 Binatlı Yılmaz
- 1993 : Çetinkaya 3–2 Gençlik Gücü
- 1994 : Yalova SK 1–0 Gaziveren
- 1995 : Gönyeli 6–0 Girne Halk Evi
- 1996 : Çetinkaya 4–0 Akıncılar
- 1997 : Küçük Kaymaklı 3–0 Gönyeli
- 1998 : Gönyeli 3–1 Çetinkaya
- 1999 : Çetinkaya 4–2 Gönyeli
- 2000 : Gönyeli 5–2 Esentepe
- 2001 : Çetinkaya 4–1 Küçük Kaymaklı
- 2002 : Küçük Kaymaklı 3–2 Gönyeli
- 2003 : Yenicami Ağdelen 2–1 Mağusa Türk Gücü
- 2004 : Küçük Kaymaklı 2–1 Yenicami Ağdelen
- 2005 : Binatlı Yılmaz 2–1 Gönyeli
- 2006 : Çetinkaya 4–0 Ozanköy
- 2007 : Türk Ocağı Limasol 4–0 Tatlısu Halk Odası
- 2008 : Gönyeli 5–1 Esentepe
- 2009 : Gönyeli 3–0 Küçük Kaymaklı
- 2010 : Gönyeli 3–1 Bostancı Bağcıl
- 2011 : Çetinkaya 3–0 (awarded) Lefke

=== Cypriot Cup (Kıbrıs Kupası) ===
- 2012 : Doğan Türk Birliği 2–2 (4–2 pen.) Küçük Kaymaklı
- 2013 : Yenicami Ağdelen 2–0 Mağusa Türk Gücü
- 2014 : Lefke 3–1 Yenicami Ağdelen
- 2015 : Yenicami Ağdelen 4–2 (a.e.t.) Mormenekşe Gençler Birliği
- 2016 : Küçük Kaymaklı 2–2 (4–3 pen.) Yenicami Ağdelen
- 2017 : Türk Ocağı Limasol 1–0 Yalova
- 2018 : Cihangir 3–1 Mağusa Türk Gücü
- 2019 : Mağusa Türk Gücü 2–1 Yenicami Ağdelen
- 2020 : Yenicami Ağdelen 3–1 Mağusa Türk Gücü
- 2022 : Mağusa Türk Gücü 2–0 Doğan Türk Birliği
- 2023 : Türk Ocağı Limasol 3–3 (5–3 pen.) Cihangir
- 2024 : Göçmenköy İdman Yurdu SK 1–1 (10–9 pen.) Mağusa Türk Gücü
- 2025 : Lefke 3–1 Mağusa Türk Gücü
- 2026 : Gençlik Gücü 2–1 Cihangir

== Performance by club ==
Clubs	Winners	Runners-up	Winning Years
Çetinkaya	17	1	1956, 1957, 1958, 1959, 1960, 1963, 1969, 1970, 1976, 1991, 1992, 1993, 1996, 1999, 2001, 2006, 2011
Gönyeli	8	10	1971, 1985, 1995, 1998, 2000, 2008, 2009, 2010
Yenicami Ağdelen	8	10	1962, 1973, 1974, 1989, 2003, 2013, 2015, 2020
Mağusa Türk Gücü	7	8	1961, 1977, 1979, 1983, 1987, 2019, 2022
Küçük Kaymaklı	7	6	1980, 1986, 1988, 1997, 2002, 2004, 2016
Türk Ocağı Limasol	6	–	1982, 1984, 1990, 2007, 2017, 2023
Lefke	3	1	1972, 2014, 2025
Doğan Türk Birliği	2	7	1978, 2012
Gençlik Gücü	2	4	1981, 2026
Yalova SK	1	2	1994
Cihangir	1	2	2018
Binatlı Yılmaz	1	1	2005
Göçmenköy İdman Yurdu SK	1	–	2024
