= Çetinkaya Türk S.K. =

Association football club in Northern Cyprus

Çetinkaya
- Full name: Çetinkaya Türk Spor Kulübü
- Founded: 3 January 1930; 96 years ago
- Ground: Nicosia Atatürk Stadium, North Nicosia
- Capacity: 28,000
- Chairman: Süleyman Yemen
- Head Coach: Derviş Kolcu
- League: Süper Lig
- 2017–18: Süper Lig, 3rd
Home colours	Away colours

Çetinkaya Türk Spor Kulübü, also known as "Kırmızı Şimşekler" (lit. 'Red Thunders'), is a Turkish Cypriot sports club based in North Nicosia. They are the most decorated team in Northern Cyprus.

== History ==
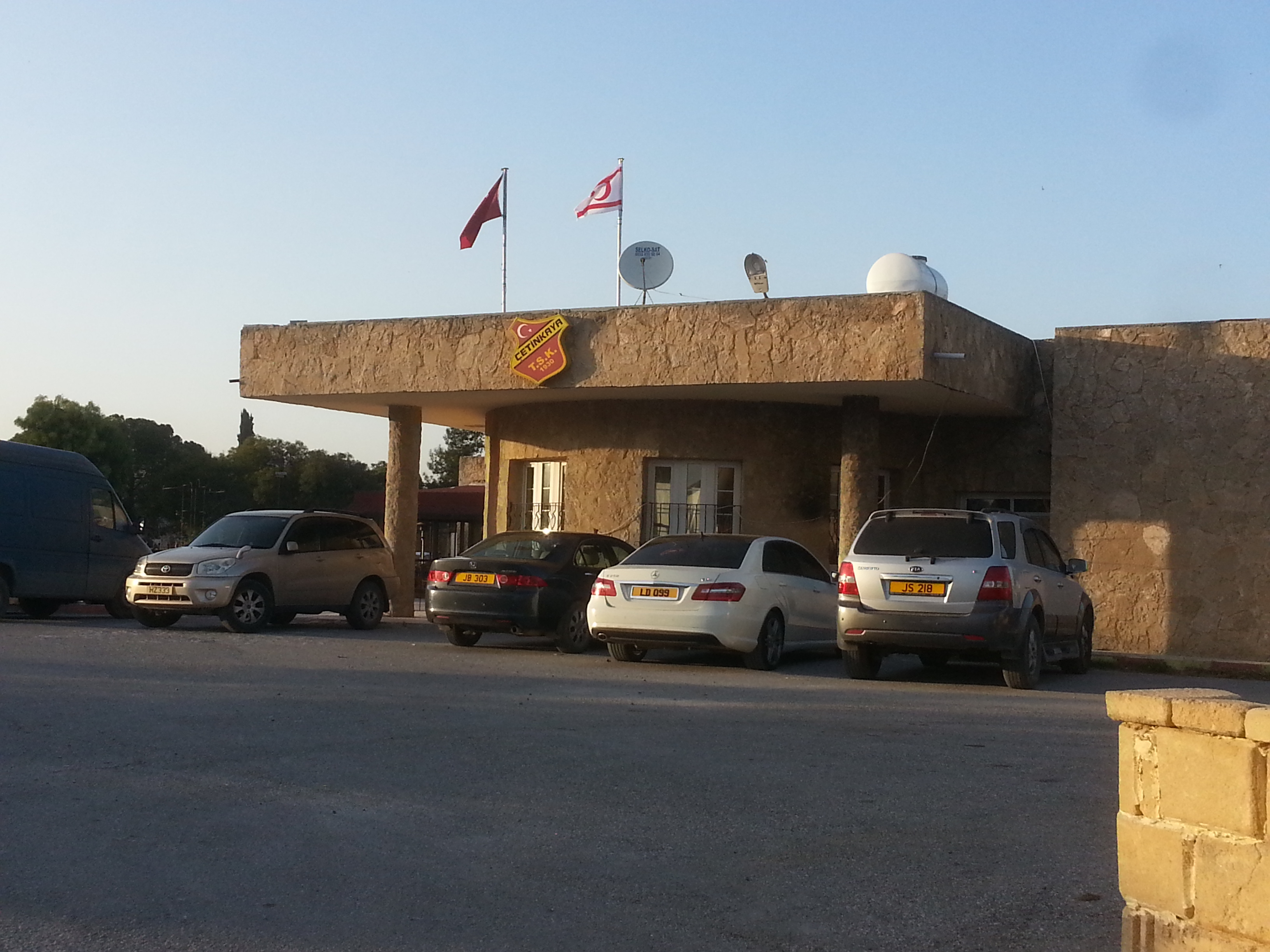
Çetinkaya headquarters in the Arab Ahmet quarter of North Nicosia.

Lefkoşa Türk Spor Kulübü was founded in 1930, and was one of the founding members of the Cypriot First Division in 1934, the sole Turkish Cypriot team in the league (with 7 Greek Cypriot teams: AEL Limassol, Trust, Olympiakos Nicosia, Aris Limassol, APOEL, Anorthosis Famagusta, and EPA Larnaca). The club merged with Çetinkaya Türk Esnaf Ocağı (founded in 1943) in 1949, changing its name to Çetinkaya Türk Spor Birliği.

The club went on to become the first team to keep the Cyprus FA Shield permanently after winning it thrice on 1951, 1952, and 1954. After the formation of Cyprus Turkish Football Federation on 1955, the club became a founding member of the Birinci Lig. Çetinkaya Türk remains the only club to have won both Cypriot leagues, main Cup competition, and Super Cup to date.

== Colours ==
The club colours are yellow and red.

== Latest seasons ==
Season	Tier	Division	Place	Cypriot Cup
2003–04	1	Süper Lig	1st	Round of 16
2004–05	1	Süper Lig	1st	
2005–06	1	Süper Lig	2nd	Champions
2006–07	1	Süper Lig	1st	Champions
2007–08	1	Süper Lig	7th	Quarter-finals
2008–09	1	Süper Lig	7th	
2009–10	1	Süper Lig	7th	First round
2010–11	1	Süper Lig	4th	Champions
2011–12	1	Süper Lig	1st	Semi-finals
2012–13	1	Süper Lig	1st	Quarter-finals
2013–14	1	Süper Lig	4th	Round of 16
2014–15	1	Süper Lig	12th	Round of 16
2015–16	1	Süper Lig	2nd	Semi-finals
2016–17	1	Süper Lig	8th	Quarter-finals
2017–18	1	Süper Lig	3rd	Quarter-finals

Season	Tier	Division	Place	Cypriot Cup
2018–19	1	Süper Lig	5th	Round of 32
2019–20	1	Süper Lig	15th	Quarter-finals
2020–21	Season suspended			
2021–22	2	1. Lig	1st	Round of 32
2022–23	1	Süper Lig	11th	Round of 32
2023–24	1	1. Lig	7th	Round of 32
2024–25	1	Süper Lig	6th	Round of 16

== Team honours ==
=== Under Cyprus Football Association (until 1954) ===
- Cypriot First Division:

Winners (1): 1950–51

- Cypriot Cup:

Winners (2): 1951–52, 1953–54
Runners-up (1): 1952–53

- Pakkos Shield: (Cypriot Super Cup)

Winners (3): 1951, 1952, 1954

=== Under Cyprus Turkish Football Association (since 1954) ===
- Birinci Lig:

Winners (14): 1957–58, 1959–60, 1960–61, 1961–62, 1969–70, 1996–97, 1997–98, 1999–2000, 2001–02, 2003–04, 2004–05, 2006–07, 2011–12, 2012–13

- Kıbrıs Kupası and Federasyon Kupası:

Winners (17): 1956, 1957, 1958, 1959, 1960, 1963, 1969, 1970, 1976, 1991, 1992, 1993, 1996, 1999, 2001, 2006, 2011
Runners-up (1): 1998

- Cumhurbaşkanlığı Kupası: (North Cypriot Super Cup)

Winners (9): 1991, 1992, 1993, 1996, 1998, 2001, 2006, 2011, 2012
Runners-up (3): 1997, 1999, 2000

- Dr. Fazıl Küçük Kupası:

Winners (5): 1992, 1993, 1996, 1998, 2000
Runners-up (3): 1991, 1999, 2001

- Başbakanlık Kupası:

Runners-up (2): 1990, 1998

== Extra reading ==
- Djavit An, Ahmet (2008). The first Turkish Cypriot football clubs, intercommunal football matches, multi-ethnic football teams and Chetinkaya (1902–1955). Paper presented at the 4th International Cyprological Congress, 29 April-3 May 2008 (PDF). Nicosia.
