= Lefkoşa District =

District of Northern Cyprus

Coordinates: 35°12′03″N 33°26′51″E

Location of Lefkoşa District within Northern Cyprus.

Lefkoşa District (Turkish: Lefkoşa İlçesi) is a district of Northern Cyprus. It is divided into two sub-districts: Lefkoşa Sub-district and Değirmenlik Sub-district. Its population is 97,293 according to the 2011 census.

Güzelyurt District has been separated from Lefkoşa District. Some parts of the Larnaca District of the Republic of Cyprus are administered by the Lefkoşa district.
