= KTFF 1. Lig =

- Founded: 1955
- Country: Northern Cyprus
- Number of clubs: 16
- Level on pyramid: 2
- Promotion to: KTFF Süper Lig
- Relegation to: BTM 1. Lig
- Domestic cup(s): Cypriot Cup (Northern Cyprus); KTFF Super Cup
- Current champions: Çetinkaya Türk S.K. (1st title) (2021-22)
- Most championships: Yalova (5 titles)
- Current: 2022-23. KTFF 1. Lig

KTFF 1. Lig (English: CTFA First League), officially AKSA 1. Lig for sponsorship reasons, formerly known as İkinci Lig (literally Second League) is the second-highest division of association football in Northern Cyprus. It is administered by the Cyprus Turkish Football Federation and has 16 clubs.

At the end of the season, the top two clubs are promoted to the KTFF Süper Lig, and the next top four clubs play play-off matches to determine the third team to be promoted. The bottom two teams are relegated to the BTM 1. Lig, and the next four clubs from the bottom determine through play-out matches the third team to be relegated.

== Current teams ==
Team	District	Stadium
Akova	Gazimağusa	Akova Eray Vudalı Stadium
Bostancı Bağcıl	Güzelyurt	Bostancı Bağcıl Stadium
Çanakkale	Gazimağusa	Çanakkale Muharrem Döveç Stadium
Değirmenlik	Lefkoşa	Değirmenlik Sadık Cemil Stadium
Doğancı	Lefke	Doğancı Emek Stadium
Dumlupınar	Gazimağusa	Gazimağusa Dr. Fazıl Küçük Stadium
Esentepe	Girne	Esentepe Erdal Barut Stadium
Girne Halk Evi	Girne	Girne 20 Temmuz Mete Adanır Stadium
Göçmenköy	Lefkoşa	Göçmenköy Stadium
Gönyeli	Lefkoşa	Gönyeli Ali Naci Karacan Stadium
Görneç	Gazimağusa	Görneç Üç Şehitler Stadium
Hamitköy	Lefkoşa	Hamitköy Esat Erdoğmuş Stadium
Lapta	Girne	Lapta Şht. Şevket Kadir Stadium
Maraş	Gazimağusa	Maraş Stadium
Mehmetçik	Gazimağusa	Mehmetçik Stadium
Mormenekşe	Gazimağusa	Mormenekşe Cemal Balses Stadium

== Champions ==
- 1955–56 – Yenicami (Nicosia)
- 1956–57 – Yeşilada (Nicosia)
- 1957–58 – Türk Ocağı (Limassol)
- 1958–59 – Küçük Kaymaklı (Nicosia)
- 1959–60 – Sönmezspor (Nicosia)
- 1960–61 – Baf Ülkü Yurdu (Paphos)
- 1961–62 – Lefke (Nicosia)
- 1962–63 – Gönyeli (Nicosia)
- 1963–64 – Abandoned due to Cypriot intercommunal violence
- 1964–65 – Not played due to Cypriot intercommunal violence
- 1965–66 – Not played due to Cypriot intercommunal violence
- 1966–67 – Not played due to Cypriot intercommunal violence
- 1967–68 – Not played due to Cypriot intercommunal violence
- 1968–69 – Gönyeli (Nicosia)
- 1969–70 – Gençlik Gücü (Nicosia)
- 1970–71 – Yalova (Nicosia)
- 1971–72 – Lefke (Nicosia)
- 1972–73 – Yalova (Nicosia)
- 1973–74 – Beyarmudu (Larnaca)
- 1974–75 – Not played due to Turkish intervention in Cyprus
- 1975–76 – Küçük Kaymaklı (Nicosia)
- 1976–77 – Yalova (Nicosia)
- 1977–78 – Beyarmudu (Nicosia)
- 1978–79 – Dumlupınar (Famagusta)
- 1979–80 – Yalova (Nicosia)
- 1980–81 – Gençler Birliği (Famagusta)
- 1981–82 – Ortaköy (Nicosia)
- 1982–83 – Yenicami (Nicosia)
- 1983–84 – Binatlı (Nicosia)
- 1984–85 – Alsancak Yeşilova (Kyrenia)
- 1985–86 – Doğan Türk Birliği (Kyrenia)
- 1986–87 – Yalova (Nicosia)
- 1987–88 – Vadili (Famagusta)
- 1988–89 – Yenicami (Nicosia)
- 1989–90 – Lefke (Nicosia)
- 1990–91 – Gençlik Gücü (Nicosia)
- 1991–92 – Gençler Birliği (Famagusta)
- 1992–93 – Akıncılar (Nicosia)
- 1993–94 – Mağusa Türk Gücü (Famagusta)
- 1994–95 – Lefke (Nicosia)
- 1995–96 – Binatlı (Nicosia)
- 1996–97 – Türk Ocağı (Kyrenia)
- 1997–98 – Doğan Türk Birliği (Kyrenia)
- 1998–99 – Baf Ülkü Yurdu (Morphou)
- 1999–00 – Gençlik Gücü (Nicosia)
- 2000–01 – Baf Ülkü Yurdu (Morphou)
- 2001–02 – Lapta (Kyrenia)
- 2002–03 – Gençler Birliği (Trikomo)
- 2003–04 – Lapta (Kyrenia)
- 2004–05 – Girne Halk Evi (Kyrenia)
- 2005–06 – Bostancı Bağcıl (Morphou)
- 2006–07 – Ozanköy (Kyrenia)
- 2007–08 – Binatlı (Morphou)
- 2008–09 – Doğan Türk Birliği (Kyrenia)
- 2009–10 – Düzkaya (Kyrenia)
- 2010–11 - Yenicami (Nicosia)
- 2011–12 - Gençlik Gücü (Nicosia)
- 2012–13 - Yeni Boğaziçi (Famagusta)
- 2013–14 – Türk Ocağı (Kyrenia)
- 2014–15 – Türk Ocağı (Kyrenia)
- 2015–16 – Dumlupınar (Famagusta)
- 2016–17 – Alsancak Yeşilova (Kyrenia)
- 2017–18 – Gönyeli (Nicosia)
- 2018–19 – Göçmenköy İYSK (Lefkoşa)
- 2019–20 – Mesarya SK
- 2020–21 – "Canceled"
- 2021–22 – GAÜ Çetinkaya Türk SK
- 2022–23 – Karşıyaka ASK
- 2023–24 – Değirmenlik SK
- 2024–25 – Mormenekşe GBSK
- 2025–26 – Baf Ülkü Yurdu

== Promotion and relegation ==
Season	Champions	Promoted	Relegated
2001-02	Lapta Türk Birliği	Düzkaya	Göçmenköy, Mehmetçik TÇB, Vadili, Mormenekşe
2002-03	Mağusa Türk Gücü	İskele Gençler Birliği	Unknown
2003-04	Lapta Türk Birliği	Doğan Türk Birliği, Yeni Boğaziçi, Baf Ülkü Yurdu	None (Birinci Lig was expanded to 14 teams)
2004-05			
2005-06	Bostancı Bağcıl	Gençlik Gücü, Tatlısu Halk Ocağı	Alsancak Yeşilova, Dagyolu Çinar, Göçmenköy
2006-07	Ozanköy	Cihangir, İskele Gençler Birliği	Yalova, Lefke Türk, Değirmenlik
2007-08	Binatlı	Türkmenköy, Alsancak Yeşilova	Serdarlı, Girne Halk Evi
2008-09	Doğan Türk Birliği	Esentepe, Gençlik Gücü	Vadili, Çanakkale, Dumlupinar
2009-10	Duzkaya S.K.		
2010-11	Yenicami Ağdelen		
2011-12	Gençlik Gücü T.S.K.	Serdarlı GB, Hamitköy ŞHSK	Çanakkale TSK, Baf Ülkü Yurdu S.K., Alsancak Yeşilova SK
