= Nicosia Atatürk Stadium =

Stadium in Northern Cyprus

Coordinates: 35°12′50″N 33°20′17″E

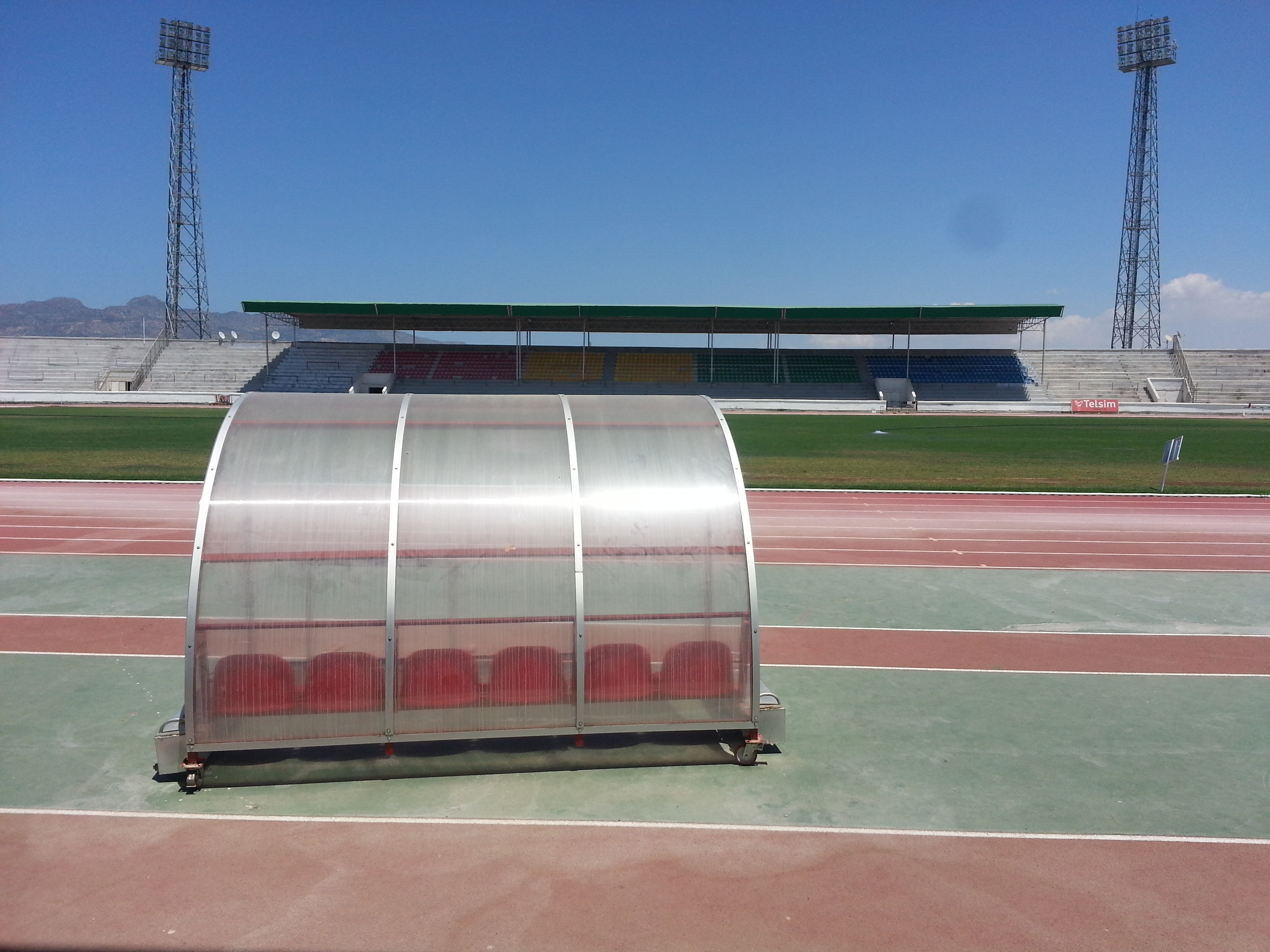
Atatürk Stadium

Lefkosa Atatürk Stadium (Turkish: Lefkoşa Atatürk Stadı) is a multi-purpose stadium in North Nicosia, Northern Cyprus. It is the largest stadium in Northern Cyprus. It is currently used mostly for football matches and hosted some matches for the 2006 ELF Cup. It also serves as the home of Çetinkaya and Yenicami of the KTFF Süper Lig and Gençlik Gücü of the KTFF Birinci Lig. The stadium holds 15,000 people, and has a tartan track that is used for athletics competitions and for walking by the locals. The stadium also hosts celebrations on national holidays, and dance shows, attended by thousands.

The plans to build a stadium with a capacity of 20,000 in northern Nicosia were announced on 20 November 1975, when a sign was placed on the fields that would be the site of the stadium. The stadium was opened on 28 January 1990, with a match between Fenerbahçe and Sarıyer, which was won 1-0 by Sarıyer. The inauguration was attended by 25,000 people, a record for Northern Cyprus, as well as Prime Minister Derviş Eroğlu, Minister of Sports Günay Caymaz, and Turkish ministers Mehmet Yazar and İsmet Özarslan. Beşiktaş, Galatasaray and Trabzonspor were also invited. The stadium was later used by Turkish teams for friendly matches in 1990s, including a match between Beşiktaş and Sarıyer on 12 January 1991. In 2010, the Turkish Cypriot Ministry of National Education, Youth and Sports transferred the ownership of the stadium to the Nicosia Turkish Municipality. It was renovated in 2011, with its grass being renewed and new electronic scoreboards installed. A shooting polygon was also unveiled in the stadium in 2014.

As the first multi-purpose stadium in Northern Cyprus, the construction of the stadium resolved the lack of an appropriate track for the training of Turkish Cypriot athletes. In work that started on 22 September 2004, the athletics track of the stadium was reconstructed as a Tartan track.

The stadium is considered to be the most prestigious in Northern Cyprus. It has a café, numerous broadcast rooms, a conference hall and a press conference hall. The stadium is the only one in Northern Cyprus with a continuous healthcare and ambulance presence in Süper Lig and Cypriot Cup matches.
