= Düzkaya K.O.S.K. =

Association football club in Northern Cyprus

Düzkaya Spor Kulübü is a Turkish Cypriot football club based in Çatalköy, Kyrenia district of Cyprus. The club competes in the Birinci Lig. The club was founded in Limassol in 1958, but had to be moved after the Turkish Invasion of Cyprus in 1974.

== Colors ==
The club colors are red and white.

== Stadium ==
The club's home stadium is Çatalköy Nihat Bağcıer Stadı, which has a capacity of about 5,000 people.
