= Lapta Türk Birliği S.K. =

Association football club in Northern Cyprus

Lapta Türk Birliği Spor Kulübü is a Turkish Cypriot football club based in Lapta in Kyrenia district of Cyprus. It was founded in 1956.

== Colors ==
The club colors are green and red.
