= Binatlı Yılmaz S.K. =

Association football club in Northern Cyprus

Binatlı Yılmaz
- Full name: Binatlı Yılmaz Spor Kulübü
- Ground: Zafer Stadı, Güzelyurt
- Capacity: 7,000
- League: İkinci Lig
- 2006–07: Birinci Lig, 14th
Home colours

Binatlı Yılmaz Spor Kulübü is a Turkish Cypriot football club based in Morphou, Northern Cyprus.

== Colors ==
The club colors are yellow and green.

== Stadium ==
The club's home stadium is Üner Berkalp Zafer Stadı.

== Honors ==
- Birinci Lig: (1)

2002–03

- Kıbrıs Kupası and Federasyon Kupası: (1)

2005
