= Hamitköy Ş.H.S.K. =

Association football club in Northern Cyprus

Hamitköy Spor Kulübü is a Turkish Cypriot football club based in Hamitköy, Nicosia District, Cyprus.

== Colors ==
The club colors are red and black.

== Stadium ==
The club's home stadium is Hamitköy Stadyumu.

== Notable players ==
- (Northern Cyprus) Orçun Karahüseyin
- (Northern Cyprus) Cemal Karamez
- (Northern Cyprus) Arinze Zakari Enemuo
