= 2019 KTFF Cypriot Cup =

2019 Cypriot Cup
Tournament details
- Country: Northern Cyprus

Final positions
- Champions: Mağusa Türk Gücü; 6th title
- Runners-up: Yenicami Ağdelen

The 2019 Cypriot Cup was the 60th edition of the Northern Cyprus national football knockout tournament.

Mağusa Türk Gücü won its sixth title after defeating Yenicami Ağdelen in the final.

== Round of 32 ==
All clubs from the season's Süper Lig and 1. Lig joined the tournament since its first round. Matches were played on 26–27 January.

Team 1	Score	Team 2
Mağusa Türk Gücü (1)	4–0	Maraş (2)
Göçmenköy (2)	2–7	Yenicami Ağdelen (1)
Vuda (2)	0–3	Doğan Türk Birliği (1)
Cihangir (1)	3–2	Hamitköy (2)
Türk Ocağı Limasol (1)	2–0	Mesarya (2)
Baf Ülkü Yurdu (1)	4–1	Değirmenlik (2)
Düzkaya (2)	2–1	Çetinkaya (1)
Yalova (2)	0–2	Girne Halk Evi (1)
Ozanköy (2)	1–0	Gönyeli (1)
Dumlupınar (2)	3–1	Alsancak Yeşilova (1)
Lefke (1)	4–0	Doğancı (2)
Gençlik Gücü (1)	4–2 (a.e.t.)	Çanakkale (2)
Bostancı Bağcıl (2)	0–1	Binatlı Yılmaz (1)
Küçük Kaymaklı (1)	1–0	Yeniboğaziçi (2)
Mormenekşe (2)	0–1	Gençler Birliği (1)
Esentepe (1)	1–0	Karşıyaka (2)

== Round of 16 ==
All matches were played on 12–13 February.

Team 1	Score	Team 2
Girne Halk Evi (1)	4–4 (a.e.t.) (4–5 p)	Gençlik Gücü (1)
Lefke (1)	0–3	Doğan Türk Birliği (1)
Mağusa Türk Gücü (1)	8–1	Gençler Birliği (1)
Esentepe (1)	1–4	Binatlı Yılmaz (1)
Türk Ocağı Limasol (1)	0–0 (a.e.t.) (3–4 p)	Yenicami Ağdelen (1)
Cihangir (1)	0–0 (a.e.t.) (2–4 p)	Dumlupınar (2)
Ozanköy (2)	3–2 (a.e.t.)	Düzkaya (2)
Baf Ülkü Yurdu (1)	3–1 (a.e.t.)	Küçük Kaymaklı (1)

== Quarter-finals ==
The quarter-finals were played on 6 and 27 March

Team 1	Agg.	Team 2	1st leg	2nd leg
Ozanköy (2)	1–14	Mağusa Türk Gücü (1)	1–4	0–10
Dumlupınar (2)	6–0	Binatlı Yılmaz (1)	2–0	4–0
Gençlik Gücü (1)	0–5	Doğan Türk Birliği (1)	0–1	0–4
Baf Ülkü Yurdu (1)	1–3	Yenicami Ağdelen (1)	0–0	1–3

== Semi-finals ==
The four quarter-final winners entered the semi-finals. The matches were played on 10 and 24 April.

Team 1	Agg.	Team 2	1st leg	2nd leg
Dumlupınar (2)	1–7	Mağusa Türk Gücü (1)	1–2	0–5
Yenicami Ağdelen (1)	4–3	Doğan Türk Birliği (1)	2–3	0–2

== Final ==
The final was held between the two semi-final winners.

18 May 2019

Mağusa Türk Gücü	2–1	Yenicami Ağdelen
	Report

Girne 20 Temmuz Mete Adanır Stadyumu, Girne
Referee: Kerem Eran

== See also ==
- 2018–19 KTFF Süper Lig
