= 2018–19 KTFF Süper Lig =

Süper Lig
- Season: 2018–19
- Dates: 20 September 2018 – 26 May 2019
- Champions: Mağusa Türk Gücü; 9th title
- Top goalscorer: (Nigeria) John Okoye Ebuka (33 goals)

The 2018–19 KTFF Süper Lig season was the 58th season of the Süper Lig in Northern Cyprus. Mağusa Türk Gücü won its 9th title three years after their last win.

== Format ==
The 2018–19 season was set to continue with the same format used the previous season. The two last teams were directly relegated to the 1. Lig, while qualified teams between the 11th and the 14th position played a relegation stage where the last qualified was also relegated.

== Teams ==
A total of sixteen teams contest the league, including thirteen sides from the 2017–18 season and three promoted from the 2017–18 KTFF 1. Lig. This includes the two top teams from the 1. Lig, and the winners of the promotion play-offs.

Promoted from 2017–18 1. Lig	Relegated from 2017–18 Süper Lig
Gönyeli; Esentepe; Girne Halk Evi	Yalova; Yeniboğaziçi; Ozanköy

== League table ==
Pos	Team	Pld	W	D	L	GF	GA	GD	Pts	Qualification or relegation
1	Mağusa Türk Gücü (C)	30	24	3	3	91	30	+61	74 (Note: Mağusa Türk Gücü was deducted 1 point. Mağusa Türk Gücü also finished ahead of Yenicami Ağdelen on head-to-head points: Mağusa Türk Gücü, 4 points; Yenicami Ağdelen, 1 point.)	
2	Yenicami Ağdelen	30	23	5	2	93	36	+57	74	
3	Doğan Türk Birliği	30	18	2	10	59	41	+18	56	
4	Alsancak Yeşilova	30	16	5	9	59	44	+15	53	
5	Çetinkaya	30	14	7	9	46	38	+8	49	
6	Türk Ocağı Limasol	30	14	5	11	54	45	+9	47	
7	Lefke	30	14	4	12	54	46	+8	46	
8	Gönyeli	30	14	3	13	50	46	+4	45	
9	Cihangir	33	14	6	13	52	63	−11	48	
10	Gençlik Gücü	30	10	6	14	59	68	−9	36 (Note: Gençlik Gücü finished ahead of Baf Ülkü Yurdu on head-to-head points: Gençlik Gücü, 4 points; Baf Ülkü Yurdu, 1 point.)	
11	Baf Ülkü Yurdu (O)	30	10	6	14	52	59	−7	36	Qualification for the relegation stage
12	Küçük Kaymaklı (O)	30	8	9	13	44	69	−25	33	Qualification for the relegation stage
13	Binatlı Yılmaz (O)	30	8	5	17	39	65	−26	29 (Note: Binatlı Yılmaz finished ahead of Esentepe on overall goal difference: Binatlı Yılmaz, –26; Esentepe, –27.)	Qualification for the relegation stage
14	Esentepe (R)	30	9	2	19	39	66	−27	29	Qualification for the relegation stage
15	Gençler Birliği (R)	30	3	9	18	30	71	−41	18	Relegation to 1. Lig
16	Girne Halk Evi (R)	30	4	3	23	39	73	−34	15	Relegation to 1. Lig

Source: RSSSF
Rules for classification: 1) Points; 2) Head-to-head points; 3) Head-to-head goal difference; 4) Overall goal difference.
(C) Champions; (O) Play-off winners; (R) Relegated

== Relegation stage ==
Teams qualified between the 11th and the 14th position played a latter stage to determine the third relegated team. They were played only two out of the three rounds as the relegation position was determined.

Pos	Team	Pld	W	D	L	GF	GA	GD	Pts	Qualification	BAF	KKA	BIN	ESE
1	Baf Ülkü Yurdu	2	1	0	1	2	4	−2	21			—	2–0	0–4
2	Küçük Kaymaklı	2	1	0	1	5	3	+2	20				1–3	4–0
3	Binatlı Yılmaz	3	1	1	1	4	4	0	19	Relegation play-off				0–0
4	Esentepe (R)	3	1	1	1	3	3	0	19	Relegation play-off				

Source: RSSSF
(R) Relegated

=== Relegation play-off ===
26 May 2019

Binatlı Yılmaz	1–0	Esentepe

== Top scorers ==
Rank	Player	Club	Goals
1	(Nigeria) John Okoye Ebuka	Yenicami	33
2	(Nigeria) Peter Ebimobowei	Gençlik Gücü	27
3	(Nigeria) John Okoli	Göçmenköy	22
4	(Ghana) Prince Boateng	Gençlik Gücü	20
5	(Nigeria) Joseph Obidiaso	Baf Ülkü Yurdu	17
5	(Northern Cyprus) Özgür Ongun	Girne Halk Evi	17
