= 2016–17 KTFF Süper Lig =

Süper Lig
- Season: 2016–17
- Dates: 23 September 2016 – 6 May 2017
- Champions: Yenicami Ağdelen; 8th title
- Top goalscorer: (Northern Cyprus) Uğur Naci Gök (36 goals)

The 2016–17 KTFF Süper Lig season was the 57th season of the Süper Lig in Northern Cyprus. Mağusa Türk Gücü was the defending champion.

Yenicami Ağdelen achieved its third Süper Lig in four years and its eighth league overall.

== Format ==
After the expansion of the league to 16 teams, in the 2016–17 season the three last qualified teams were relegated to the 1. Lig.

== Teams ==
A total of sixteen teams contest the league, including twelve sides from the 2015–16 season and four promoted from the 2015–16 KTFF 1. Lig. This includes the two top teams from the 1. Lig, and the two winners of the promotion play-offs.

Promoted from 2015–16 1. Lig	Relegated from 2015–16 Süper Lig
Dumlupınar; Gençlik Gücü; Yalova; Baf Ülkü Yurdu	Yeniboğaziçi; Bostancı Bağcıl

== League table ==
Pos	Team	Pld	W	D	L	GF	GA	GD	Pts	Relegation
1	Yenicami Ağdelen (C)	30	22	6	2	84	21	+63	72	
2	Doğan Türk Birliği	30	17	5	8	53	28	+25	56	
3	Cihangir	30	15	9	6	54	36	+18	54	
4	Gençler Birliği	30	16	5	9	52	36	+16	53	
5	Küçük Kaymaklı	30	14	9	7	47	36	+11	51	
6	Yalova	30	12	11	7	55	42	+13	47	
7	Türk Ocağı Limasol	30	14	4	12	60	44	+16	46	
8	Çetinkaya	30	13	4	13	55	46	+9	43	
9	Lefke	30	12	6	12	45	50	−5	42	
10	Gençlik Gücü	30	11	5	14	38	49	−11	38	
11	Baf Ülkü Yurdu	30	11	3	16	46	61	−15	36	
12	Binatlı Yılmaz	30	9	8	13	50	59	−9	35	
13	Mağusa Türk Gücü	30	9	7	14	36	45	−9	34	
14	Değirmenlik (R)	30	7	5	18	30	67	−37	26	Relegation to 1. Lig
15	Dumlupınar (R)	30	5	5	20	36	76	−40	20	Relegation to 1. Lig
16	Mormenekşe (R)	30	5	4	21	36	81	−45	19	Relegation to 1. Lig

Source: RSSSF
Rules for classification: 1) Points; 2) Head-to-head points; 3) Head-to-head goal difference; 4) Overall goal difference.
(C) Champions; (R) Relegated

== Top scorers ==
Rank	Player	Club	Goals
1	(Nigeria) John Okoye Ebuka	Yenicami	41
2	(Northern Cyprus) Ertaç Taşkıran	Türk Ocağı Limasol	38
3	(Northern Cyprus) Kasım Tağman	Lefke	25
4	(Northern Cyprus) Halil Turan	Küçük Kaymaklı	23
5	(Nigeria) Joseph Obidiaso	Türk Ocağı Limasol	16
