= 2017 KTFF Cypriot Cup =

2017 Cypriot Cup
Tournament details
- Country: Northern Cyprus

Final positions
- Champions: Türk Ocağı Limasol; 5th title
- Runners-up: Yalova

The 2017 Cypriot Cup was the 58th edition of the Northern Cyprus national football knockout tournament.

Türk Ocağı Limasol achieved their fifth title, ten years after its last one. They defeated Yalova in the final.

== Round of 32 ==
All clubs from the season's Süper Lig and 16 teams from the 1. Lig joined the tournament since its first round. Matches were played on 1–2 February.

Team 1	Score	Team 2
Binatlı Yılmaz (1)	3–2	Mehmetçik (2)
Küçük Kaymaklı (1)	6–0	Lapta Türk Birliği S.K. (2)
Tatlısu Seracılar (2)	1–4	Türk Ocağı Limasol (1)
Girne Halk Evi (2)	0–2	Gençler Birliği (1)
Yalova (1)	5–0	Maraş (2)
Ozanköy (2)	3–1	Değirmenlik (1)
Gönyeli (2)	0–3	Gençlik Gücü (1)
Mormenekşe (1)	2–1	Yeniboğaziçi (2)
Baf Ülkü Yurdu (1)	3–0	Göçmenköy (2)
Doğancı (2)	1–3	Lefke (1)
Düzkaya (2)	0–3	Cihangir (1)
Yenicami Ağdelen (1)	4–1	Alsancak Yeşilova (2)
Doğan Türk Birliği (1)	2–0	Mesarya (2)
Serdarlı (2)	0–1	Dumlupınar (1)
Akova Vuda (2)	5–2	Mağusa Türk Gücü (1)
Çetinkaya (1)	4–0	Esentepe (2)

== Round of 16 ==
All matches were played on 15 February.

Team 1	Score	Team 2
Mormenekşe (1)	0–2	Gençler Birliği (1)
Dumlupınar (1)	0–1	Gençlik Gücü (1)
Küçük Kaymaklı (1)	6–0	Lefke (1)
Akova Vuda (2)	0–6	Çetinkaya (1)
Ozanköy (2)	0–1	Baf Ülkü Yurdu (1)
Yenicami Ağdelen (1)	2–3	Cihangir (1)
Doğan Türk Birliği (1)	0–1	Türk Ocağı Limasol (1)
Binatlı Yılmaz (1)	2–4 (a.e.t.)	Yalova (1)

== Quarter-finals ==
The quarter-finals were played on 15 and 29 March.

Team 1	Agg.	Team 2	1st leg	2nd leg
Küçük Kaymaklı (1)	5–2	Cihangir G.S.K. (1)	1–1	4–1
Türk Ocağı Limasol (1)	7–4	Çetinkaya (1)	2–2	5–2
Gençlik Gücü (1)	2–6	Yalova	0–3	2–3
Baf Ülkü Yurdu (1)	1–2	Gençler Birliği	1–2	0–0

== Semi-finals ==
The four quarter-final winners entered the semi-finals. The matches were played on 12 and 26 April.

Team 1	Agg.	Team 2	1st leg	2nd leg
Gençler Birliği (1)	3–4	Türk Ocağı Limasol (1)	1–1	2–3
Yalova (1)	4–3	Küçük Kaymaklı (1)	3–3	1–0

== Final ==
The final was held between the two semi-final winners.

12 May 2017

Türk Ocağı Limasol	1–0	Yalova
Uçar 20'	Report

Dr. Fazıl Küçük Stadium, Gazimağusa
Referee: Fehmi Dayı

== See also ==
- 2016–17 KTFF Süper Lig
