= List of football clubs in Northern Cyprus =

This is a list of active association football clubs in Northern Cyprus as of 2019–2020 season.

== Men's ==
=== Süper Lig ===
- Alsancak Yeşilova
- Baf Ülkü Yurdu
- Binatlı
- Cihangir
- Çetinkaya
- Doğan Türk Birliği
- Düzkaya
- Gençlik Gücü
- Göçmenköy
- Gönyeli
- Hamitköy
- Küçük Kaymaklı
- Lefke
- Mağusa Türk Gücü
- Türk Ocağı
- Yenicami

=== 1. Lig ===
- Bostancı Bağcıl
- Çanakkale
- Doğancı
- Dörtyol
- Dumlupınar
- Esentepe
- Gençler Birliği
- Girne Halk Evi
- Görneç
- Karşıyaka
- Lapta
- Maraş
- Mesarya
- Mormenekşe
- Ozanköy
- Yalova

=== BTM 1. Lig ===
==== Beyaz Grup ====
- Değirmenlik
- Denizli
- Dikmen Gücü
- Düzova
- Karaoğlanoğlu
- Ortaköy
- Tatlısu
- Yılmazköy
- Zümrütköy

==== Kırmızı Grup ====
- Dipkarpaz
- Geçitkale
- İncirli
- İskele Trabzon
- Mehmetçik
- Serdarlı
- Türkmenköy
- Vadili
- Yarköy
- Yeni Boğaziçi

=== BTM 2. Lig ===
==== 1. Grup ====
- Bafra
- Ergazi
- Kumyalı
- Sipahi
- Yedikonuk
- Yeni Erenköy

==== 2. Grup ====
- Ardahan
- Boğaziçi
- Civisil
- Ötüken
- Karadeniz 61

==== 3. Grup ====
- Çayönü
- Güvercinlik
- Mutluyaka
- Pergama
- Akdoğan Spor kulübü
- Yenişehir

==== 4. Grup ====
- Akıncılar
- Dilekkaya
- Gaziköy
- Gönendere
- Kırıkkale
- Yeniceköy

==== 5. Grup ====
- Ağırdağ Boğaz
- Alayköy Kültür
- Bahçeli
- Demirhan
- Haspolat
- Pınarbaşı

==== 6. Grup ====
- Akdeniz Kültür
- Çamlıbel
- Kalkanlı
- Sadrazam Kayalar
- Tepebaşı

==== 7. Grup ====
- Akçay
- Gayretköy
- Mevlevi
- Serhatköy
- Yeşilyurt

=== Under-age leagues only ===
- Alayköy Gençlik
- Büyükkonuk
- Tatlısu Seracılar

Yarakspor 1931

== Women's ==
=== Kadınlar Ligi ===
- Akdeniz
- Alsancak Yeşilova
- Dumlupınar
- Geçitkale
- Göçmenköy
- Mağusa Spor Akademisi

== Inactive clubs ==
- Akova Vuda
- Aydınköy
- Baf Canbulat
- Balıkesir
- Dağyolu
- Dağyolu-Şirinevler
- Tuzla
- Yıldırım

== See also ==
- List of football teams
