= List of top-division football clubs in non-FIFA countries =

This is a list of top-division football clubs in non-FIFA countries.

On the 26 members of the Nouvelle Fédération-Board, only 9 have an autonomous football league system: Chagos Islands, Gozo, Gibraltar, Greenland, Kiribati, Somaliland, Turkish Republic of Northern Cyprus, Tuvalu and Zanzibar.

== NF-Board ==
Club	Country or region
FC All Whites	Chechnya
FC Naursky District	Chechnya
Vainakh Argun	Chechnya
Orga Argun	Chechnya
Kavkaz Aldy	Chechnya
Alkha Alkhan Yurt	Chechnya
Berd Berdykel	Chechnya
Vedeno Goity	Chechnya
Uragan Goity	Chechnya
Terek Gums Gudermes	Chechnya
Nokhcho Kurchaloi	Chechnya
Typhoon Koshkeldy	Chechnya
Irs Noviye Atagi	Chechnya
Samashki Tolstoy Yurt	Chechnya
Terek Tolstoy Yurt	Chechnya
Avtodor Urus Martan	Chechnya
Naur Naursky	Chechnya
Terek Grozny II	Chechnya
Terek III Republican F.C.	Chechnya
Chekhkar Starye Atagi	Chechnya
Daimokhk Grozny	Chechnya
Kavkaz Grozny	Chechnya
Loko-Gums Gudermes	Chechnya
Spartak Naur	Chechnya
Għajnsielem F.C.	Gozo
Nadur Youngsters F.C.	Gozo
S.K. Victoria Wanderers F.C.	Gozo
Sannat Lions F.C.	Gozo
Victoria Hotspurs F.C.	Gozo
Xagħra United F.C.	Gozo
Xewkija Tigers F.C.	Gozo
Aasiaat-97	Greenland
B-67	Greenland
Eqaluk-56	Greenland
G-44	Greenland
Kâgssagssuk	Greenland
FC Malamuk	Greenland
Nagdlunguaq-48	Greenland
UB-68	Greenland
Club Deportivo Cumberland	Chile
Club Deportivo Juan Fernández	Chile
Club Deportivo Selkirk	Chile
Club Deportivo y Social Nocturno	Chile
Abaiang F.C.	Kiribati
Abemana F.C.	Kiribati
Aranuka F.C.	Kiribati
Arorae F.C.	Kiribati
Banaba F.C.	Kiribati
Beru F.C.	Kiribati
Betio Town Council	Kiribati
Butaritari F.C.	Kiribati
Christmas F.C.	Kiribati
Kuria F.C.	Kiribati
Makin F.C.	Kiribati
Maiana F.C.	Kiribati
Marakei F.C.	Kiribati
Nikunau F.C.	Kiribati
Nonouti F.C.	Kiribati
North Tarawa F.C.	Kiribati
Onotoa F.C.	Kiribati
Tabiteuea North F.C.	Kiribati
Tabiteuea South F.C.	Kiribati
Tabuaeran F.C.	Kiribati
Tarawa Urban Council	Kiribati
Tarawa Urban Council II	Kiribati
Teraina F.C.	Kiribati
Binatlı Yılmaz	Northern Cyprus
Bostancı Bağcıl	Northern Cyprus
Çetinkaya Türk	Northern Cyprus
Düzkaya	Northern Cyprus
Gençlik Gücü	Northern Cyprus
Gönyeli	Northern Cyprus
Hamitköy	Northern Cyprus
Küçük Kaymaklı Türk	Northern Cyprus
Lapta	Northern Cyprus
Mağusa Türk Gücü	Northern Cyprus
Tatlısu Halk Ocağı	Northern Cyprus
Türk Ocağı Limasol	Northern Cyprus
Yeni Boğaziçi	Northern Cyprus
Yenicami Ağdelen	Northern Cyprus
FC Manu Laeva	Tuvalu
FC Nanumaga	Tuvalu
FC Niutao	Tuvalu
FC Tofaga	Tuvalu
Nauti FC	Tuvalu
Nui	Tuvalu
Lakena United	Tuvalu
Tamanuku	Tuvalu
Bandari	Zanzibar
JKU FC	Zanzibar
KMKM	Zanzibar
Mafunzo	Zanzibar
Malindi FC	Zanzibar
Miembeni	Zanzibar
Mundu SC	Zanzibar
Mlandege	Zanzibar
Polisi	Zanzibar
Seblen	Zanzibar
Sharp Boys	Zanzibar
Small Simba	Zanzibar
Taifa Jang'ombe	Zanzibar
Urafiki	Zanzibar
Wailes	Zanzibar
Zimamoto	Zanzibar

== Non NF-Board countries ==
Club	Country or region
Eckerö IK	Åland
Hammarlands IK	Åland
IF Fram	Åland
IF Östernäskamraterna	Åland
IF Finströms Kamraterna	Åland
IFK Mariehamn	Åland
Jomala IK	Åland
Sunds IF	Åland
Åland United (women)	Åland
Buada Sport	Nauru
Comp Phos	Nauru
Hospital Nauru	Nauru
Nauru Police	Nauru
Work Force Phos	Nauru
University Nauru	Nauru
A.S. Ilienne Amateur	Saint-Pierre and Miquelon
A.S. Miquelonnaise	Saint-Pierre and Miquelon
A.S. Saint Pierraise	Saint-Pierre and Miquelon

== Notes ==
- Åland has its own championship tournament during the winter break, but during the regular season all of the clubs compete either in the Finnish or the Swedish football league system.
- Chechnya has no domestic league, and all these clubs competed in the Russian football league system.
- In Juan Fernández Islands there are four amateur clubs, playing only one level.
- In Nauru were six amateur clubs, playing only one level.
- In Saint-Pierre and Miquelon there are three amateur clubs, playing only one level.

== See also ==
- Ålands Fotbollförbund
- Chechnya Football Federation
- Liga de Fútbol de Juan Fernández
- List of football clubs in Gozo
- List of football clubs in Greenland
- List of football clubs in Kiribati
- List of football clubs in Northern Cyprus
- List of football clubs in Tuvalu
- List of football clubs in Zanzibar
- List of association football competitions
- Nauru Soccer League
- Ligue de Football de Saint Pierre et Miquelon
- List of top-division football clubs in AFC countries
- List of top-division football clubs in CAF countries
- List of top-division football clubs in CONCACAF countries
- List of top-division football clubs in CONMEBOL countries
- List of top-division football clubs in OFC countries
- List of top-division football clubs in UEFA countries
