= 2022 KTFF Cypriot Cup =

2022 Cypriot Cup
Tournament details
- Country: Northern Cyprus

Final positions
- Champions: Mağusa Türk Gücü; 7th title
- Runners-up: Doğan Türk Birliği

The 2022 Cypriot Cup was the 62nd edition of the Northern Cyprus national football knockout tournament, the first one after the suspension of the 2021 edition due to the COVID-19 pandemic.

Mağusa Türk Gücü won its sevent title, three years after their last Cup, by defeating Doğan Türk Birliği.

== Round of 32 ==
All clubs from the season's Süper Lig and 1. Lig joined the tournament since its first round. Matches were played on 29 and 30 December 2021.

| Team 1 | Score | Team 2 |
|---|---|---|
| Gönyeli (1) | 4–0 | Maraş (2) |
| Çetinkaya (2) | 0–3 | Lefke (1) |
| Hamitköy (1) | 0–2 | Gençlik Gücü (2) |
| Küçük Kaymaklı (1) | 5–0 | Yalova (2) |
| Girne Halk Evi (1) | 4–1 | Çanakkale (2) |
| Düzkaya (2) | 0–3 | Türk Ocağı Limasol (1) |
| Binatlı Yılmaz (1) | 2–4 (a.e.t.) | Değirmenlik (2) |
| Bostancı Bağcıl (2) | 1–2 | Dumlupınar (1) |
| Cihangir (1) | 3–0 | Mormenekşe (2) |
| Gençler Birliği (2) | 0–3 | Mağusa Türk Gücü (1) |
| Görneç (2) | 1–7 | Alsancak Yeşilova (1) |
| Dörtyol (2) | 2–3 | Doğan Türk Birliği (1) |
| İncirli (2) | 4–7 | Baf Ülkü Yurdu (1) |
| Karşıyaka (2) | 1–1 (a.e.t.) (5–6 p) | Yenicami Ağdelen (1) |
| Mesarya (1) | 3–1 | Yeniboğaziçi (2) |
| Göçmenköy (1) | 1–0 | Esentepe (2) |

== Round of 16 ==
All matches were played between 8 and 9 February.

| Team 1 | Score | Team 2 |
|---|---|---|
| Girne Halk Evi (1) | 1–0 | Lefke (1) |
| Yenicami Ağdelen (1) | 3–2 | Gençlik Gücü (2) |
| Gönyeli (1) | 1–1 (a.e.t.) (3–5 p) | Cihangir (1) |
| Doğan Türk Birliği (1) | 2–1 | Alsancak Yeşilova (1) |
| Küçük Kaymaklı (1) | 2–0 | Türk Ocağı Limasol (1) |
| Baf Ülkü Yurdu (1) | 2–2 (a.e.t.) (0–2 p) | Mağusa Türk Gücü (1) |
| Mesarya (1) | 4–0 | Değirmenlik (2) |
| Dumlupınar (1) | 2–0 | Göçmenköy (1) |

== Quarter-finals ==
The first legs of the quarter-finals were played on 23 February and the second legs on 15–16 March.

| Team 1 | Agg. | Team 2 | 1st leg | 2nd leg |
|---|---|---|---|---|
| Yenicami Ağdelen (1) | 7–3 | Girne Halk Evi (1) | 6–2 | 1–1 |
| Doğan Türk Birliği (1) | 3–1 | Cihangir (1) | 2–1 | 1–0 |
| Küçük Kaymaklı (1) | 5–0 | Dumlupınar (1) | 3–0 | 2–0 |
| Mesarya (1) | 2–5 | Mağusa Türk Gücü (1) | 1–1 | 1–4 |

== Semi-finals ==
The four quarter-final winners entered the semi-finals. The matches were played on 5–6 and 19–20 April 2022.

| Team 1 | Agg. | Team 2 | 1st leg | 2nd leg |
|---|---|---|---|---|
| Küçük Kaymaklı (1) | 2–3 | Doğan Türk Birliği (1) | 1–0 | 1–3 |
| Mağusa Türk Gücü (1) | 8–3 | Yenicami Ağdelen (1) | 2–3 | 6–0 |

== Final ==
The final was held between the two semi-final winners.

13 May 2022

| Doğan Türk Birliği | 0–2 | Mağusa Türk Gücü |
|---|---|---|
| | Report | Poté 82', 90' |

Nicosia Atatürk Stadium, North Nicosia
Referee: Mehmet Sezener

== See also ==
- 2021–22 KTFF Süper Lig
