= 2025–26 KTFF Süper Lig =

Süper Lig
- Season: 2025–26
- Dates: 18 September 2025 – 17 May 2026
- Champions: Gençlik Gücü
- Relegated: Gönyeli; Lefke; Yeniboğaziçi

The 2025–26 KTFF Süper Lig season was the 64th season of the Süper Lig in Northern Cyprus.

== Format ==
The 2025–26 season was set to continue with the same format used the previous season. The two last teams were directly relegated to the 1. Lig, while qualified teams between the 11th and the 14th position played a relegation stage where the last qualified was also relegated.

== Teams ==
Location of 2025–26 KTFF Süper Lig teams in Northern Cyprus

Sixteen teams contested the league; thirteen teams remaining from the previous season, and three teams promoted from the KTFF 1. Lig. Mağusa Türk Gücü entered the season as defending champions.

The promoted teams were the 2024–25 KTFF 1. Lig champions Mormenekşe, runners-up Küçük Kaymaklı, and play-off winners Yeniboğaziçi. They replaced the 2024–25 KTFF Süper Lig relegation play-off bottom-placed team Göçmenköy, and bottom two teams Gençler Birliği and Değirmenlik.

=== Stadiums and locations ===
Team	City/village	Stadium
Alsancak Yeşilova	alsancak	Alsancak Mustafa Hidayet Çağlar Stadium
Cihangir	Cihangir	Cihangir Stadium
Çetinkaya	Lefkoşa	Lefkoşa Atatürk Stadium
Doğan Türk Birliği	Girne	Girne 20 Temmuz Mete Adanır Stadium
Dumlupınar	Gazimağusa	Gazimağusa Dr. Fazıl Küçük Stadium
Esentepe	Esentepe	Esentepe Erdal Barut Stadium
Gençlik Gücü	Lefkoşa	Lefkoşa Atatürk Stadium
Gönyeli	Gönyeli	Gönyeli Stadium
Karşıyaka	Girne	Karşıyaka Şampiyon Melekler Stadium
Küçük Kaymaklı	Lefkoşa	Lefkoşa Şehit Hüseyin Ruso Stadium
Lefke	Lefke	Lefke 16 Ağustos Stadium
Mağusa Türk Gücü	Gazimağusa	Canbulat Stadium
Mesarya	Gazimağusa	Paşaköy Hasan Onalt Stadium
Mormenekşe	Gazimağusa	Gazimağusa Dr. Fazıl Küçük Stadium
Yeniboğaziçi	Yeni Boğaziçi	Yeniboğaziçi Osman Ergün Mehmet Stadium
Yenicami Ağdelen	Lefkoşa	Lefkoşa Atatürk Stadium

== League table ==
Pos	Team	Pld	W	D	L	GF	GA	GD	Pts	Qualification or relegation
1	Gençlik Gücü (C)	30	23	4	3	72	20	+52	73 (Note: Head-to-head points: Gençlik Gücü 4, Cihangir 1.)	
2	Cihangir	30	23	4	3	93	34	+59	73	
3	Doğan Türk Birliği	30	20	8	2	73	35	+38	68	
4	Mağusa Türk Gücü	30	17	6	7	69	42	+27	57	
5	Dumlupınar	30	14	4	12	61	46	+15	46	
6	Çetinkaya	30	12	6	12	47	45	+2	42	
7	Alsancak Yeşilova	30	11	5	14	51	58	−7	38	
8	Küçük Kaymaklı	30	10	7	13	41	42	−1	37 (Note: Head-to-head goal difference: Küçük Kaymaklı +2, Yenicami Ağdelen -2.)	
9	Yenicami Ağdelen	30	10	7	13	41	55	−14	37	
10	Esentepe	30	10	6	14	46	51	−5	36	
11	Lefke	30	10	5	15	41	51	−10	35	Qualification for the Relegation play-offs
12	Karşıyaka	30	8	8	14	53	76	−23	32 (Note: Head-to-head points: Karşıyaka 6, Mesarya 0.)	Qualification for the Relegation play-offs
13	Mesarya	30	9	5	16	55	67	−12	32	Qualification for the Relegation play-offs
14	Mormenekşe	30	8	4	18	48	86	−38	28	Qualification for the Relegation play-offs
15	Gönyeli (R)	30	4	9	17	26	71	−45	21	Relegation to the 1. Lig
16	Yeniboğaziçi (R)	30	5	4	21	32	70	−38	19	Relegation to the 1. Lig

Source: KTFF
Rules for classification: 1) Points; 2) Head-to-head points; 3) Head-to-head goal difference; 4) Overall goal difference.
(C) Champions; (R) Relegated

== Results ==
Home \ Away	ALS	CIH	ÇET	DTB	DUM	ESE	GEG	GÖN	KAR	KKA	LEF	MAG	MES	MOR	YEB	YEC
Alsancak Yeşilova	—	1–5	1–4	0–3	2–0	3–3	0–2	1–1	3–3	2–1	2–1	0–1	3–2	3–1	4–0	2–3
Cihangir	4–5	—	4–3	4–2	3–1	4–1	1–1	4–0	7–1	3–0	4–2	1–1	4–1	6–0	2–0	2–0
Çetinkaya	1–0	2–1	—	0–1	4–0	1–3	1–2	1–2	2–2	0–0	2–1	1–0	2–2	3–0	2–1	0–1
Doğan Türk Birliği	3–2	1–1	5–4	—	2–1	3–1	1–1	4–1	4–1	1–0	3–0	3–1	2–1	8–1	3–0	0–0
Dumlupınar	1–4	1–1	2–1	1–3	—	2–0	1–2	4–0	7–2	0–1	5–0	1–1	4–0	4–1	2–1	1–2
Esentepe	1–3	0–3	0–1	1–1	0–1	—	1–3	2–0	2–1	0–1	1–2	1–3	0–0	5–0	3–1	2–2
Gençlik Gücü	2–1	2–0	3–0	1–2	0–1	3–0	—	1–0	3–2	2–2	2–0	1–0	1–3	3–1	5–0	2–2
Gönyeli	0–0	0–2	1–1	1–2	0–4	0–0	0–4	—	4–4	1–1	1–5	0–1	0–3	2–1	1–0	1–1
Karşıyaka	1–1	0–4	2–1	1–1	2–1	2–3	0–1	2–2	—	0–3	1–1	2–6	2–1	2–5	6–3	2–1
Küçük Kaymaklı	3–1	0–1	1–2	0–2	3–4	0–2	0–4	1–1	0–2	—	1–0	1–4	2–0	1–1	0–0	3–0
Lefke	1–2	0–1	2–0	2–2	3–1	1–0	0–1	2–1	1–1	0–3	—	4–6	2–1	2–0	5–2	1–0
Mağusa Türk Gücü	2–1	2–5	4–0	3–3	3–1	2–2	1–3	7–0	4–2	0–0	3–0	—	0–2	5–2	3–2	1–0
Mesarya	3–0	2–5	2–3	3–0	1–2	4–3	0–4	3–2	0–2	4–6	1–1	0–0	—	3–5	1–2	5–3
Mormenekşe	2–0	3–4	1–1	2–4	2–6	2–4	0–4	6–1	1–0	1–5	1–1	3–2	2–2	—	2–1	0–2
Yeniboğaziçi	1–2	1–3	1–1	0–3	1–1	1–2	0–2	2–0	2–4	2–1	2–1	1–2	1–4	2–1	—	2–2
Yenicami Ağdelen	3–2	1–4	0–3	2–2	1–1	1–3	0–7	2–3	3–2	2–1	1–0	0–1	4–1	0–1	2–0	—

Source: RSSSF
Legend: Blue = home team win; Yellow = draw; Red = away team win.

== Relegation play-offs ==
Teams placed 11th-14th played each other for the third time (either at home or away), with the bottom two teams being relegated. The higher-placed team in the regular season received home advantage.

Pos	Team	Pld	W	D	L	GF	GA	GD	Pts	Relegation
1	Karşıyaka	3	1	2	0	6	2	+4	5	
2	Mesarya	3	1	2	0	4	2	+2	5	
3	Lefke (R)	3	0	3	0	3	3	0	3	Relegation to the 1. Lig
4	Mormenekşe (R)	3	0	1	2	3	9	−6	1	Relegation to the 1. Lig

Source: KTFF
Rules for classification: 1) Points; 2) Head-to-head points; 3) Head-to-head goal difference; 4) Overall goal difference.
(R) Relegated

=== Results ===
Home \ Away	KAR	LEF	MES	MOR
Karşıyaka	—	—	0–0	4–0
Lefke	2–2	—	0–0	1–1
Mesarya	—	—	—	4–2
Mormenekşe	—	—	—	—

Source: RSSSF
Legend: Blue = home team win; Yellow = draw; Red = away team win.

== Top scorers ==
Rank	Player	Club	Goals
1	(Guinea-Bissau) Ussumane Djabi	Çetinkaya	26
2	(Northern Cyprus) Şenol Şöför	Mağusa Türk Gücü	25
3	(Central African Republic) Christopher Fourmy	Lefke	22
4	(Turkey) Muhittin Tümbül	Cihangir	19
4	(Senegal) Oumar Diouf	Gençlik Gücü	19
6	(Trinidad and Tobago) Quesi Weston	Alsancak Yeşilova	17
6	(Senegal) Babacar Diop	Cihangir	17
6	(Nigeria) Andy Okpe	Mağusa Türk Gücü	17
9	(Mauritania) Souleymane Doukara	Gönyeli	16
10	(Nigeria) Lukman Adeshina	Esentepe	14

-->
