= 2024 KTFF Cypriot Cup =

2024 Cypriot Cup
Tournament details
- Country: Northern Cyprus

Final positions
- Champions: Göçmenköy; 1st title
- Runners-up: Mağusa Türk Gücü

The 2024 Cypriot Cup was the 63rd edition of the Northern Cyprus national football knockout tournament.

Göçmenköy won its first title ever after defeating Mağusa Türk Gücü in a long penalty-shootout.

== Round of 32 ==
All clubs from the season's Süper Lig and 1. Lig joined the tournament since its first round. Matches were played on 20 and 21 January.

| Team 1 | Score | Team 2 |
|---|---|---|
| Mağusa Türk Gücü (1) | 4–1 | Yılmazköy (2) |
| Hamitköy (2) | 1–3 | Gençlik Gücü (1) |
| Küçük Kaymaklı (1) | 3–2 (a.e.t.) | Maraş (2) |
| Binatlı Yılmaz (2) | 0–3 | Doğan Türk Birliği (1) |
| Mormenekşe (2) | 0–1 | Göçmenköy (1) |
| Alsancak Yeşilova (1) | 2–0 | Girne Halk Evi (2) |
| Değirmenlik (2) | 2–0 | Çetinkaya (1) |
| Karşıyaka (1) | 4–0 | Esentepe (2) |
| Yenicami Ağdelen (1) | 2–0 | Gönyeli (2) |
| Türk Ocağı Limasol (1) | 3–5 (a.e.t.) | Yalova (2) |
| Düzkaya (2) | 2–3(a.e.t.) | Mesarya (1) |
| Lapta Türk Birliği (2) | 1–2 | Dumlupınar (1) |
| Cihangir (1) | 4–0 | Baf Ülkü Yurdu (2) |
| Çanakkale (2) | 0–5 | Yeniboğaziçi (1) |
| Geçitkale (2) | 2–4 (a.e.t.) | Lefke (1) |
| Gençler Birliği (1) | 4–1 | Kozanköy (2) |

== Round of 16 ==
Değirmenlik and Yalova were the only two teams from 1. Lig qualified for this round. All matches were played on 14 February.

| Team 1 | Score | Team 2 |
|---|---|---|
| Doğan Türk Birliği (1) | 4–2 | Lefke (1) |
| Yeniboğaziçi (1) | 2–4 | Dumlupınar (1) |
| Küçük Kaymaklı (1) | 0–1 | Yenicami Ağdelen (1) |
| Yalova (2) | 0–3 | Göçmenköy (1) |
| Alsancak Yeşilova (1) | 0–2 | Değirmenlik (2) |
| Mesarya (1) | 1–3 | Mağusa Türk Gücü (1) |
| Gençlik Gücü (1) | 0–0 (a.e.t.) (3–4 p) | Cihangir G.S.K. (1) |
| Gençler Birliği (1) | 1–3 | Karşıyaka (1) |

== Quarter-finals ==
The first legs of the quarter-finals were played on 6 March and the second legs on 20 March.

| Team 1 | Agg. | Team 2 | 1st leg | 2nd leg |
|---|---|---|---|---|
| Göçmenköy (1) | 4–3 | Cihangir (1) | 1–1 | 3–2 (a.e.t.) |
| Karşıyaka (1) | 2–1 | Değirmenlik (2) | 1–1 | 1–0 |
| Doğan Türk Birliği (1) | 2–5 | Mağusa Türk Gücü (1) | 1–3 | 1–2 |
| Dumlupınar (1) | 4–1 | Yenicami Ağdelen (1) | 2–1 | 2–0 |

== Semi-finals ==
The four quarter-final winners entered the semi-finals. The matches were played on 3–4 and 17 April 2024.

| Team 1 | Agg. | Team 2 | 1st leg | 2nd leg |
|---|---|---|---|---|
| Göçmenköy (1) | 4–1 | Karşıyaka (1) | 2–1 | 2–0 |
| Mağusa Türk Gücü (1) | 4–1 | Dumlupınar (1) | 1–1 | 3–0 (a.e.t.) |

== Final ==
The final was held between the two semi-final winners.

9 May 2024

| Göçmenköy | 1–3 (a.e.t.) | Mağusa Türk Gücü |
|---|---|---|
| | Report |

Nicosia Atatürk Stadium, North Nicosia
Referee: Turgay Misk

== See also ==
- 2023–24 KTFF Süper Lig
