= 2014–15 KTFF Süper Lig =

Süper Lig
- Season: 2014–15
- Dates: 27 September 2014 – 10 May 2015
- Champions: Yenicami Ağdelen; 7th title
- Top goalscorer: (Northern Cyprus) Kasım Tağman (28 goals)

The 2014–15 KTFF Süper Lig season was the 55th season of the Süper Lig in Northern Cyprus. Yenicami Ağdelen, the defending champion, repeated as winner achieving its 7th title overall.

== Format ==
The 2014–15 season was set to continue with the same format used the previous season. The two last teams were directly relegated to the 1. Lig, while qualified teams between the 9th and the 12th position played a relegation stage where the last qualified was also relegated.

== Teams ==
A total of eleven teams contest the league, including eleven sides from the 2013–14 season and three promoted from the 2013–14 KTFF 1. Lig. This includes the two top teams from the 1. Lig, and the winner of the promotion play-offs.

Promoted from 2013–14 1. Lig	Relegated from 2013–14 Süper Lig
Yeniboğaziçi; Yalova; Gençlik Gücü	Gönyeli; Lapta Türk Birliği; Esentepe

== League table ==
Pos	Team	Pld	W	D	L	GF	GA	GD	Pts	Qualification or relegation
1	Yenicami Ağdelen (C)	26	22	2	2	86	20	+66	68	
2	Küçük Kaymaklı	26	17	4	5	58	26	+32	55	
3	Mormenekşe	26	14	6	6	42	24	+18	48	
4	Doğan Türk Birliği	26	14	4	8	50	37	+13	46	
5	Lefke	26	13	1	12	60	40	+20	40	
6	Cihangir	26	11	6	9	46	43	+3	39	
7	Mağusa Türk Gücü	26	11	4	11	42	37	+5	37 (Note: Mağusa Türk Gücü finished ahead of Yeniboğaziçi on overall goal difference: Mağusa Türk Gücü, +5; Yeniboğaziçi, –4.)	
8	Yeniboğaziçi	26	9	10	7	22	26	−4	37	
9	Serdarlı (R)	26	8	11	7	40	35	+5	35	Qualification to relegation stage
10	Bostancı Bağcıl (O)	26	9	7	10	59	39	+20	34	Qualification to relegation stage
11	Gençler Birliği (O)	26	9	6	11	36	32	+4	33	Qualification to relegation stage
12	Çetinkaya (O)	26	7	5	14	33	55	−22	26	Qualification to relegation stage
13	Gönyeli (R)	26	1	3	22	28	107	−79	6 (Note: Gönyeli finished ahead of Lapta Türk Birliği on head-to-head points: Gönyeli, 4 points; Lapta Türk Birliği, 1 point.)	Relegation to 1. Lig
14	Lapta Türk Birliği (R)	26	1	3	22	12	93	−81	6	Relegation to 1. Lig

Source: RSSSF
Rules for classification: 1) Points; 2) Head-to-head points; 3) Head-to-head goal difference; 4) Overall goal difference.
(C) Champions; (O) Play-off winners; (R) Relegated

== Relegation stage ==
Teams qualified between the 9th and the 12th position played a latter stage to determine the third relegated team. They were played only two out of the three rounds as the relegation position was determined.

Pos	Team	Pld	W	D	L	GF	GA	GD	Pts	Relegation	LGB	BOS	ÇET	SER
1	Gençler Birliği	3	2	0	1	4	3	+1	23			—	2–0	0–4
2	Bostancı Bağcıl	3	1	0	2	6	7	−1	20		2–3		2–0	
3	Çetinkaya	3	2	0	1	4	2	+2	19					3–0^{1}
4	Serdarlı (R)	3	1	0	2	4	6	−2	18 (Note: Serdarlı were deducted three points.)	Relegation to 1. Lig	0–1	4–2		

Source: RSSSF
(R) Relegated
Notes:
- ^{1} Match awarded to Çetinkaya by 3–0. The match ended originally 0–0.
