= 2017–18 KTFF Süper Lig =

Süper Lig
- Season: 2017–18
- Dates: 22 September 2017 – 23 May 2018
- Champions: Yenicami Ağdelen; 9th title
- Top goalscorer: (Northern Cyprus) Uğur Naci Gök (36 goals)

The 2017–18 KTFF Süper Lig season was the 57th season of the Süper Lig in Northern Cyprus. Yenicami Ağdelen defended the title and achieved its fourth Süper Lig in five years and its ninth league overall.

== Format ==
The 2017–18 season changed its format as two last teams were directly relegated to the 1. Lig, while qualified teams between the 11th and the 14th position played a relegation stage where the last qualified was also relegated.

== Teams ==
A total of sixteen teams contest the league, including thirteen sides from the 2016–17 season and three promoted from the 2016–17 KTFF 1. Lig. This includes the two top teams from the 1. Lig, and the winners of the promotion play-offs.

Promoted from 2016–17 1. Lig	Relegated from 2016–17 Süper Lig
Alsancak Yeşilova; Ozanköy; Yeniboğaziçi	Değirmenlik; Dumlupınar; Mormenekşe

== League table ==
Pos	Team	Pld	W	D	L	GF	GA	GD	Pts	Qualification or relegation
1	Yenicami Ağdelen (C)	30	18	7	5	63	33	+30	61	
2	Doğan Türk Birliği	30	17	6	7	61	42	+19	57	
3	Çetinkaya	30	16	7	7	57	42	+15	55	
4	Binatlı Yılmaz	30	14	8	8	58	43	+15	50	
5	Alsancak Yeşilova	30	12	12	6	46	35	+11	48	
6	Baf Ülkü Yurdu	30	12	9	9	63	43	+20	45	
7	Lefke	30	13	5	12	64	48	+16	44	
8	Cihangir	30	12	7	11	53	49	+4	43	
9	Küçük Kaymaklı	30	13	3	14	61	62	−1	42	
10	Türk Ocağı Limasol	30	13	2	15	47	45	+2	41 (Note: Türk Ocağı Limasol also finished ahead of Mağusa Türk Gücü on head-to-head points: Türk Ocağı Limasol, 4 points; Mağusa Türk Gücü, 1 point.)	
11	Mağusa Türk Gücü (O)	30	11	8	11	54	47	+7	41	Qualification for the relegation stage
12	Gençler Birliği (O)	30	10	7	13	52	60	−8	37	Qualification for the relegation stage
13	Gençlik Gücü (O)	30	10	4	16	40	65	−25	34	Qualification for the relegation stage
14	Yalova (R)	30	6	7	17	45	68	−23	25	Qualification for the relegation stage
15	Yeniboğaziçi (R)	30	5	9	16	24	59	−35	24	Relegation to 1. Lig
16	Ozanköy (R)	30	4	7	19	29	76	−47	19	Relegation to 1. Lig

Source: RSSSF
Rules for classification: 1) Points; 2) Head-to-head points; 3) Head-to-head goal difference; 4) Overall goal difference.
(C) Champions; (O) Play-off winners; (R) Relegated

== Relegation stage ==
Teams qualified between the 11th and the 14th position played a latter stage to determine the third relegated team. They were played only two out of the three rounds as the relegation position was determined.

Pos	Team	Pld	W	D	L	GF	GA	GD	Pts	Relegation	LGB	MTG	GEG	YAL
1	Gençler Birliği	3	1	1	1	4	4	0	23				1–2	1–1
2	Mağusa Türk Gücü	3	0	1	2	7	9	−2	22		1–2		1–1	
3	Gençlik Gücü	3	1	1	1	5	5	0	21					2–3
4	Yalova (R)	3	2	1	0	10	8	+2	20	Relegation to the 1. Lig		6–5		

Source: RSSSF
(R) Relegated

== Top scorers ==
Rank	Player	Club	Goals
1	(Northern Cyprus) Uğur Naci Gök	Cihangir	36
2	(Nigeria) John Okoye Ebuka	Yenicami	33
3	(Nigeria) Peter Ebimobowei	Gençlik Gücü	22
4	(Ghana) Felix Obada	Yeniboğaziçi	21
5	(Nigeria) Chinonso Offor	Binatlı Yılmaz	20
5	(Northern Cyprus) Burak Koçar	Türk Ocağı Limasol	20
