= Soccer in Niue =

- Country: Niue
- National team: men's national team

International competitions
- OFC Champions League; FIFA World Cup

The sport of soccer in the country of Niue was previously run by the Niue Island Soccer Association, which as of 2021 was considered inactive for a decade. Despite OFC records showing their admission, the OFC accounts statements list them in the 2007-09 and 2012-15 statements, with the records showing 1200 NZD given in grants across that time. The national team was only ever active in the 1983 South Pacific Games. The association administered the national soccer team, as well as the Niue Soccer Tournament, but appears to have gone inactive prior to any women's tournaments being organised.

The association reformed in the early 2020's as the Niue Football Association, which has hosted multiple development tournaments for both genders. An attempt to re-establish contact with the OFC, who had mentioned 3 associate members up until that point, resulted in their expulsion due to inactivity.
