= 2025 KTFF Cypriot Cup =

2025 Cypriot Cup
Tournament details
- Country: Northern Cyprus

Final positions
- Champions: Lefke; 3rd title
- Runners-up: Mağusa Türk Gücü

The 2025 KTFF Cypriot Cup was the 63rd edition of the Northern Cyprus national football knockout tournament.

Lefke won the cup on 9 May 2025 (their third Cypriot Cup win), defeating Mağusa Türk Gücü 3–1 in the final.

== Round of 32 ==
All clubs from the season's Süper Lig and 1. Lig joined the tournament since its first round. Matches were played on 18 and 19 January.

Team 1	Score	Team 2
Esentepe (1)	2–1 (a.e.t.)	Yılmazköy (2)
Yalova (2)	0–5	Çetinkaya (1)
Alsancak Yeşilova (1)	3–1	Mormenekşe (2)
Göçmenköy (1)	2–2 (a.e.t.) (4–2 p)	Küçük Kaymaklı (2)
Çanakkale (2)	0–6	Doğan Türk Birliği (1)
Maraş (2)	0–5	Cihangir (1)
Mesarya (1)	6–2	Geçitkale (2)
Karşıyaka (1)	0–2	Kozanköy (2)
Mağusa Türk Gücü (1)	6–0	Binatlı Yılmaz (2)
Yeniboğaziçi (2)	4–4 (a.e.t.) (4–5 p)	Gönyeli (1)
Hamitköy (2)	2–3	Gençlik Gücü (1)
Düzkaya (2)	0–3 (Note: Match awarded to Gençler Birliği.)	Gençler Birliği (1)
Lapta Türk Birliği (2)	2–4	Lefke (1)
Vadili (2)	1–2	Yenicami Ağdelen (1)
Dumlupınar (1)	3–0	Dipkarpaz (2)
Değirmenlik (1)	3–3 (a.e.t.) (4–2 p)	Türk Ocağı Limasol (2)

== Round of 16 ==
Kozanköy was the only team from 1. Lig qualified for this round. All matches were played on 12 February.

Team 1	Score	Team 2
Esentepe (1)	1–1 (a.e.t.) (2–0 p)	Kozanköy (2)
Cihangir (1)	1–1 (a.e.t.) (3–2 p)	Gençlik Gücü (1)
Gençler Birliği (1)	2–0	Gönyeli (1)
Lefke (1)	2–1 (a.e.t.)	Doğan Türk Birliği (1)
Mesarya (1)	1–1 (a.e.t.) (4–3 p)	Alsancak Yeşilova (1)
Dumlupınar (1)	4–0	Yenicami Ağdelen (1)
Değirmenlik (1)	1–1 (a.e.t.) (3–4 p)	Göçmenköy (1)
Mağusa Türk Gücü (1)	8–0	Çetinkaya (1)

== Quarter-finals ==
The first legs of the quarter-finals were played on 5 March and the second legs on 19 March.

Team 1	Agg.	Team 2	1st leg	2nd leg
Mağusa Türk Gücü (1)	2–1	Cihangir (1)	0–0	2–1
Lefke (1)	6–4	Gençler Birliği (1)	4–1	2–3
Mesarya (1)	4–2	Göçmenköy (1)	3–1	1–1
Dumlupınar (1)	4–2	Esentepe (1)	2–1	2–0

== Semi-finals ==
The four quarter-final winners entered the semi-finals. The matches were played on 9 and 30 April 2025.

Team 1	Agg.	Team 2	1st leg	2nd leg
Lefke (1)	5–2	Mesarya (1)	2–0	3–2
Dumlupınar (1)	1–5	Mağusa Türk Gücü (1)	1–2	3–0

== Final ==
The final was held between the two semi-final winners.

9 May 2025

Mağusa Türk Gücü	1–3	Lefke
	Report

Nicosia Atatürk Stadium, North Nicosia
Referee: Kerem Eran

== See also ==
- 2024–25 KTFF Süper Lig
