= 2015–16 KTFF Süper Lig =

Süper Lig
- Season: 2015–16
- Dates: 23 September 2015 – 6 May 2016
- Champions: Yenicami Ağdelen; 8th title
- Top goalscorer: (Northern Cyprus) Halil Turan (26 goals)

The 2015–16 KTFF Süper Lig season was the 56th season of the Süper Lig in Northern Cyprus. Yenicami Ağdelen was the defending champion.

Mağusa Türk Gücü achieved their eighth title, ten years after the last one.

== Format ==
Prior to an expansion of the league to 16 teams, in the 2014–15 season would be played without the relegation play-off and only being relegated the two last qualified teams.

== Teams ==
A total of fourteen teams contest the league, including eleven sides from the 2014–15 season and three promoted from the 2014–15 KTFF 1. Lig. This includes the two top teams from the 1. Lig, and the winner of the promotion play-offs.

Promoted from 2014–15 1. Lig	Relegated from 2014–15 Süper Lig
Türk Ocağı Limasol; Değirmenlik; Binatlı Yılmaz	Serdarlı; Gönyeli; Lapta Türk Birliği

== League table ==
Pos	Team	Pld	W	D	L	GF	GA	GD	Pts	Relegation
1	Mağusa Türk Gücü (C)	26	15	5	6	52	33	+19	50	
2	Çetinkaya	26	13	10	3	62	35	+27	49	
3	Binatlı Yılmaz	26	13	7	6	53	37	+16	46	
4	Gençler Birliği	26	13	6	7	51	34	+17	45	
5	Lefke	26	11	7	8	43	34	+9	40	
6	Yenicami Ağdelen	26	10	9	7	45	37	+8	39	
7	Küçük Kaymaklı	26	11	6	9	41	36	+5	39	
8	Türk Ocağı Limasol	26	10	8	8	44	36	+8	38	
9	Doğan Türk Birliği	26	9	7	10	56	51	+5	34	
10	Cihangir	26	10	4	12	45	46	−1	34	
11	Değirmenlik	26	7	5	14	39	63	−24	26	
12	Mormenekşe	26	6	6	14	30	46	−16	24	
13	Yeniboğaziçi (R)	26	4	7	15	33	67	−34	19	Relegation to 1. Lig
14	Bostancı Bağcıl (R)	26	2	9	15	18	57	−39	15	Relegation to 1. Lig

Source: RSSSF
Rules for classification: 1) Points; 2) Head-to-head points; 3) Head-to-head goal difference; 4) Overall goal difference.
(C) Champions; (R) Relegated

== Top scorers ==
Rank	Player	Club	Goals
1	(Northern Cyprus) Halil Turan	Küçük Kaymaklı	26
2	(Northern Cyprus) Ertaç Taşkıran	Türk Ocağı Limasol	19
2	(Nigeria) Victor Nwani	Değirmenlik	19
4	(Northern Cyprus) Cemil Awwad	Değirmenlik	14
5	(Northern Cyprus) Kemal Uçaner	Binatlı Yılmaz	13
