= List of top-division football clubs in OFC countries =

OFC countries on this map of the world's six football confederations.

This is a list of top-division association football clubs in OFC countries. OFC is the football confederation that oversees the sport in Oceania. The OFC is made up of 11 full members and 3 associate members.

The football associations of Australia and Guam are members of AFC, the Asian football confederation (Australia was previously an OFC member but had left), and the football association of Northern Mariana Islands is a provisional associate member of AFC (previously an OFC associate member but had left). The football associations of Kiribati, Niue and Tuvalu are associate members of OFC (but not members of FIFA). The sovereign states of the Marshall Islands, Federated States of Micronesia, Nauru and Palau, as well as the dependent territories of Norfolk Island, Pitcairn Islands, Tokelau, and Wallis and Futuna, are not members of OFC or any other football confederation.

Each of the OFC member countries have their own football league systems, as do some non-members. The clubs playing in each top-level league compete for the title as the country's club champions, and also for some countries, places in next season's OFC club competition, i.e., the OFC Champions League. Due to promotion and relegation, the clubs playing in the top-level league in some countries are different every season.

The champions of the previous season in each country are listed in bold.

- For clubs playing at lower divisions, see the separate articles linked to in the relevant sections.
- For clubs belonging to any of the other five continental football confederations of the world, see List of football (soccer) clubs.

**Club name**	Club finished the previous season as league champions.

== Oceania ==
- Australia, Fiji, French Polynesia, New Zealand, Papua New Guinea, Solomon Islands, Vanuatu
- Football association: Oceania Football Confederation
- Top-level league: OFC Professional League

Leading teams in the 2026 season
Country or territory	Team	City
New Zealand	Auckland FC	Auckland
Fiji	Bula FC	Suva
Papua New Guinea	PNG Hekari	Port Moresby
Solomon Islands	Solomon Kings	Honiara
New Zealand	South Island United	Christchurch
Australia	South Melbourne	Melbourne
French Polynesia	Tahiti United	Pīraʻe
Vanuatu	Vanuatu United	Port Vila

== American Samoa ==
- American Samoa
- Football association: Football Federation American Samoa
- Top-level league: FFAS Senior League

As of 2024 season

Club	City
Black Roses	Pago Pago
Green Bay	Faga'alu
Ilaoa and To'omata	Pago Pago
Lion Heart	Pago Pago
**Pago Youth**	Pago Pago
PanSa East	Pago Pago
Royal Puma	Pago Pago
Tafuna Jets	Pago Pago
Tupulaga Fagasa	Fagasā
Utulei Youth	Pago Pago
Vaiala Tongan	Pago Pago

== Cook Islands ==
- Cook Islands
- Football association: Cook Islands Football Association
- Top-level league: Cook Islands Round Cup

As of 2026 season

Club	City
Avatiu	Avarua
Matavera	Matavera
Nikao Sokattack F.C.	Avarua (Nikao)
Puaikura	Arorangi
Titikaveka	Titikaveka
**Tupapa Maraerenga**	Avarua

== Easter Island/Rapa Nui ==
- Easter Island
- Football association: Asociación de Fútbol de Isla de Pascua
- Top-level league: Liga de Fútbol de Rapa Nui

As of 2025 season

Club	City
Aukara	Hanga Roa
Hoe Vaka	Hanga Roa
Mataveri A	Hanga Roa
Mataveri B	Hanga Roa
Moe Roa	Hanga Roa
Moe Roa Junior	Hanga Roa
Tahai	Hanga Roa
Vai Ara Tea	Hanga Roa

== Fiji ==
- Fiji
- Football association: Fiji Football Association
- Top-level league: Fiji Premier League

As of 2024 season

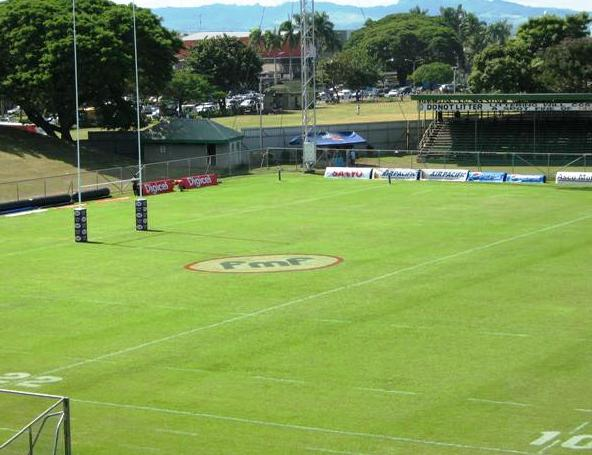
Churchill Park—home to Lautoka F.C.—also hosts rugby union matches.

Club	City
Ba	Ba Town
Labasa	Labasa
Lautoka	Lautoka
Nadi	Nadi
Nadroga	Nadroga
Nasinu	Nasinu
Navua	Navua
**Rewa**	Nausori
Suva	Suva
Tailevu Naitasiri	Nausori

Pos	Team	Pld	Pts
1	Rewa (C)	18	43
2	Labasa	18	32
3	Lautoka	18	31
4	Navua	18	29
5	Ba	18	28
6	Nadi	18	25
7	Suva	18	22
8	Nadroga	18	17
9	Nasinu	18	15
10	Tailevu Naitasiri (R)	18	12

Source: Fiji FA RSSSF
(C) Champions; (R) Relegated

== Kiribati ==
- Kiribati
- Football association: Kiribati Football Association
- Top-level league: Tekinati Cup/Kiribati National Championship (Te Runga)/Kiribati Champions League

=== Tekinati Cup ===
Club
Coral Ace FC
**FC Moel**
Mataburo
Crusaders
Saint Rabaere
Saint John United
Like It
Tiennarere
MTC
Bairiki FC
Saint Vincent
Tekinati FC
Digital Kiribati II
Bautanaraoi
Saint Betero
Tabito
Digital Kiribati I
SM OutBreak
Vodafone
Strikers

=== Kiribati National Championship (Te Runga) ===
As of 2023 season

Club
**Betio Town Council**
Nonouti
Marakei
Tamana
Arorae
Kuria
Teinainano Urban Council
Abemama
Banaba
North Tarawa
Beru
Tabiteuea South
Butaritari
Maiana
Abaiang
Tabiteuea North
Tabuaeran
Kiritimati
Aranuka
Makin
Nikunau
Onotoa
Teraina

== Federated States of Micronesia ==
- Federated States of Micronesia
- Football association: Federated States of Micronesia Football Association
- Top-level league: none

== Nauru ==
- Nauru
- Football association: Nauru Soccer Federation
- Top-level league: Nauru Soccer Tournament

As of 2018 season

Club	City
Capelle & Partner	Ewa
Kilipati A	Ewa
Kilipati B	Ewa
Tuvalu	Ewa
Solomon Islands	Ewa

== New Caledonia ==
- New Caledonia
- Football association: Fédération Calédonienne de Football
- Top-level league: New Caledonia Super Ligue

As of 2024 season

Club	City
AS Kunié	L'Île-des-Pins
AS Lössi	Nouméa
**AS Magenta**	Nouméa
AS Mont-Dore	Le Mont-Dore
AS Tiga Sport	Nouméa
ASC Gaïca	Nouméa
CA Saint-Louis	Saint-Louis
Hienghène Sport	Hienghène
Horizon Patho	Nouméa
SC Ne Drehu	Nouméa

== New Zealand ==
- New Zealand
- Football association: New Zealand Football
- Top-level league: New Zealand National League
  - Northern League
  - Central League
  - Southern League

As of 2025 season

=== Northern League ===
Team	Location
Auckland City	Sandringham, Auckland
Auckland FC Reserves	Whenuapai, Auckland
Auckland United	Mount Roskill, Auckland
Bay Olympic	New Lynn, Auckland
Birkenhead United	Birkenhead, Auckland
East Coast Bays	Northcross, Auckland
Eastern Suburbs	Kohimarama, Auckland
Fencibles United	Pakuranga, Auckland
Manurewa	Manurewa, Auckland
Tauranga City	Mount Maunganui, Tauranga
West Coast Rangers	Whenuapai, Auckland
Western Springs	Westmere, Auckland

=== Central League ===
Team	Location
Island Bay United	Island Bay, Wellington
Miramar Rangers	Miramar, Wellington
Napier City Rovers	Napier
North Wellington	Johnsonville, Wellington
Petone	Petone, Lower Hutt
Upper Hutt City	Maidstone, Upper Hutt
Waterside Karori	Karori, Wellington
Wellington Olympic	Wellington
Wellington Phoenix Reserves	Lower Hutt
Western Suburbs	Porirua

=== Southern League ===
Team	Location
Cashmere Technical	Woolston, Christchurch
Christchurch United	Spreydon, Christchurch
Coastal Spirit	Linwood, Christchurch
Dunedin City Royals	South Dunedin, Dunedin
Ferrymead Bays	Ferrymead, Christchurch
Nelson Suburbs	Stoke, Nelson
Nomads United	Casebrook, Christchurch
Selwyn United	Rolleston
University of Canterbury	Ilam, Christchurch
Wanaka	Wānaka

Location of clubs in New Zealand for the 2026 National League season
Northern League; Central League; Southern League

Pos	Team	Pld	Pts
1	Birkenhead United (C, P)	22	58
2	Eastern Suburbs (P)	22	47
3	Auckland City (P)	22	45
4	Auckland United (P)	22	41
5	Fencibles United	22	41
6	East Coast Bays	22	35
7	Auckland FC Reserves (P)	22	27
8	Western Springs (O, P)	22	24
9	Melville United	22	20
10	Bay Olympic	22	16
11	Tauranga City	22	15
12	Manukau United	22	7

Source: NRF
(C) Champions;
(O) Play-off winners;
(P) Promoted

Pos	Team	Pld	Pts
1	Napier City Rovers (C, P)	18	44
2	Wellington Olympic (P)	18	42
3	Miramar Rangers (P)	18	41
4	Western Suburbs	18	36
5	Upper Hutt City	18	24
6	Island Bay United	18	22
7	Waterside Karori	18	15
8	Petone	18	13
9	Wellington Phoenix Reserves (P)	18	11
10	FC Western	18	6

Source: Capital Football
(C) Champions;
(P) Promoted

Pos	Team	Pld	Pts
1	Cashmere Technical (C, P)	18	52
2	Ferrymead Bays	18	38
3	Nomads United	18	36
4	Coastal Spirit (P)	18	34
5	Nelson Suburbs	18	25
6	Northern	18	23
7	Christchurch United	18	20
8	Dunedin City Royals	18	16
9	Wānaka	18	10
10	Selwyn United	18	7

Source: Mainland Football
(C) Champions;
(P) Promoted

Pos	Team	Pld	Pts
1	Cashmere Technical	2	6
2	Auckland United	2	4
3	Miramar Rangers	2	4
4	Ferrymead Bays	2	4
5	Auckland City	1	3
6	Wellington Olympic	2	3
7	Eastern Suburbs	2	1
8	Napier City Rovers	2	1
9	Wellington Phoenix Reserves	2	1
10	Auckland FC Reserves	2	0
11	Birkenhead United	1	0

Updated to match(es) played on 4 October 2026.
Source: New Zealand Football

== Niue ==
- Niue
- Football association: Niue Football Association
- Top-level league: Niue Soccer Tournament

As of 2023 season

Club
Alofi
Ava
Avatele
Hakupu
Liku
Makefu
Muta
Talava
Tuapa
**Vaiea**

== Palau ==
- Palau
- Football association: Palau Football Association
- Top-level league: Palau Soccer League

As of 2014 season

Club
Kramers FC
Lyon FC
New Stars FC
**Surangel and Sons Company**
Team Friendship FC

== Papua New Guinea ==
- Papua New Guinea
- Football association: Papua New Guinea Football Association
- Top-level league: Papua New Guinea Premier Soccer League

As of 2024 season

Club	City
Admiralty FC	Manus
**Hekari United**	Port Moresby
Lae City	Lae
Lae City Dwellers	Lae
Morobe Wawens	Morobe
Port Moresby Strikers	Port Moresby
PRK Gulf Komara	Gulf
United Highlands	Highlands

Pos	Team	Pld	Pts
1	Hekari United (C)	14	35
2	Gulf Komara	14	23
3	Port Moresby Strikers	14	22
4	Lae City	14	18
5	Morobe Wawens	14	17
6	United Highlands	14	17
7	Lae City Dwellers	14	14
8	Admiralty Islands	14	10

Source: RSSSF
(C) Champions

== Samoa ==
- Samoa
- Football association: Football Federation Samoa
- Top-level league: Samoa National League

As of 2024 season

Club	City
Brothers United FC	Mount Frere
Faatoia United FC	Apia
Lepea FC	Lepea
Lotopa SC	Lotopa
Lupe o le Soaga	Tuanaimato
Moata'a FC	Apia
**Vaipuna SC**	Apia
Vaitele-Uta	Vaitele
Vaivase-Tai	Tuanaimato

== Solomon Islands ==
- Solomon Islands
- Football association: Solomon Islands Football Federation
- Top-level league: Solomon Islands S-League

As of 2024 season

Club	City
**Central Coast**	Honiara
Henderson Eels	Honiara
Honiara City	Honiara
Juniper Tree	Honiara
Kossa FC	Honiara
Laugu United	Honiara
Marist FC	Honiara
Real Kakamora	Honiara
Solomon Warriors	Honiara
SOSA	Honiara
Southern United	Honiara
Waneagu United	Honiara

Pos	Team	Pld	Pts
1	Central Coast (C)	22	53
2	Solomon Warriors	22	52
3	Real Kakamora	22	45
4	Laugu United	22	43
5	Henderson Eels	22	36
6	Marist	22	34
7	Waneagu United	22	33
8	Honiara City	22	17
9	SOSA	22	17
10	KOSSA	22	17
11	Southern United	22	14
12	Juniper Tree	22	6

Source: Sofascore RSSSF
(C) Champions

== Tahiti ==
- French Polynesia
- Football association: Fédération Tahitienne de Football
- Top-level league: Tahiti Ligue 1

As of 2024−25 season

Club	City
AS Central Sport	Papeete
AS Dragon	Papeete
AS Manu-Ura	Papeete
AS Mira	Papetoai
**AS Pirae**	Pirae
AS Pueu	Taiarapu-Est
AS Taiarapu	Taiʻarapu-Ouest
AS Tamarii Punaruu	Puna'auia
AS Tefana	Faa'a
AS Vénus	Mahina

== Tonga ==
- Tonga
- Football association: Tonga Football Association
- Top-level league: Tonga Major League

As of 2023 season

Club	City
Folaha FC	Nuku'alofa
Lavengatonga FC	Nuku'alofa
Lotoha'apai United	Nuku'alofa
Marist	Nuku'alofa
Navutoka FC	Nuku'alofa
Nukuhetulu	Nuku'alofa
Popua FC	Nuku'alofa
**Veitongo FC**	Nuku'alofa

== Tuvalu ==
- Tuvalu
- Football association: Tuvalu National Football Association
- Top-level league: Tuvalu A-Division

As of 2023 season

Location of the represented clubs (islands) in the 2023 A-Division

Club	Island
Manu Laeva	Nukulaelae
FC Ha'apai United	Nanumanga
**Nauti**	Funafuti
Tamanuku	Nukufetau
Tofaga	Vaitupu
Vaoloa	Nui

== Wallis and Futuna ==
- Wallis and Futuna
- Football association: Wallis and Futuna Soccer Federation
- Top-level league: AJFU Tournoi Foot

As of 2023 season

Club	Island
Boites à Chaussures	Wallis
Concombres de Mer	Wallis

== Vanuatu ==
- Vanuatu
- Football association: Vanuatu Football Federation
- Top-level league:
  - Port Vila Football League
  - VFF Champions League

=== Port Vila Football League ===
As of 2024 season

Club	City
ABM Galaxy	Port Vila
**Ifira Black Bird FC**	Ifira
Mauriki FC	Port Vila
Naka FC	Port Vila
North Efate United FC	Port Vila
Tupuji Imere FC	Port Vila

=== VFF Champions League ===
As of 2024 season

Club	City
Classic FC	Luganville
Classic Kapalpal FC	Tafea
**Ifira Black Bird FC**	Ifira
Matevulu FC	Sanma
Police FC	Malampa
Rainbow FC	Torba
Red Star FC	Shefa
Tanabululuana FC	Penama

== See also ==
- List of top-division football clubs in CONMEBOL countries
- List of top-division football clubs in CONCACAF countries
- List of top-division football clubs in non-FIFA countries
- List of top-division football clubs in UEFA countries
- List of top-division football clubs in CAF countries
- List of top-division football clubs in AFC countries
- List of association football competitions
