= 1985 Niue League Championship =

The 1985 Niue League Championship was an edition of the Niue League Championship. The league consisted of two divisions, with a total of 19 participating teams from 16 clubs.

== Venues ==
1985 Niue League Championship venues
(Niue) Alofi
Niue High School
Capacity: Unknown
(Niue) Tuapa
Tuapa Village Park
Capacity: Unknown

== Division One ==
Niue League Championship
- Season: 1985
- Champions: Alofi
- Matches: 45
- Goals: 180 (4 per match)

Pos	Team	Pld	W	D	L	GF	GA	GD	Pts
1	Alofi (C)	9	8	0	1	31	9	+22	16
2	Hakupu	9	8	0	1	31	8	+23	16
3	Tuapa	9	5	2	2	19	12	+7	12
4	Avatele	9	4	1	4	22	14	+8	9
5	Tomakakautoga	9	4	1	4	13	15	−2	9
6	Liku	9	2	4	3	15	21	−6	8
7	Mutalau	9	2	2	5	15	29	−14	6
8	Alofi B	9	2	2	5	10	17	−7	6
9	Makefu	9	2	1	6	12	21	−9	5
10	Lakepa	9	2	0	7	12	28	−16	4

Source: NFA
(C) Champions

=== Championship Play Off ===
As Hakupu and Alofi finished the league with the same amount of points, the league committee determined that the two teams should play a single match to determine the championship. Hakupu protested the match, as they believed that the title should have been awarded to them due to the better goal difference.

1985

Alofi	w/o	Hakupu

== Division Two ==
Niue League Championship Division Two
- Season: 1985
- Champions: Hakupu B
- Matches: 36
- Goals: 192 (5.33 per match)

Pos	Team	Pld	W	D	L	GF	GA	GD	Pts
1	Hakupu B	8	8	0	0	37	4	+33	16
2	Combine Brothers	8	5	2	1	32	14	+18	12
3	Tomakakautoga B	8	5	2	1	28	10	+18	12
4	Avatele B	8	3	2	3	14	12	+2	8
5	Cool and The Gang	8	4	0	4	22	16	+6	8
6	Talava	8	3	1	4	18	15	+3	7
7	Alofi C	8	3	0	5	18	22	−4	6
8	Tuapa B	8	1	1	6	11	47	−36	3
9	Mutalau B	8	0	0	8	12	44	−32	0

Source: NFA
