= Vaiea United FC =

- Full name: Vaiea United Football Club
- Ground: Vaiea Ground; Vaiea, Niue
- Capacity: 100
- League: Niue Soccer Tournament
- 2025: 1st, Champions (8)

Vaiea United FC, also known as Vaiea FC is a Niuean football club from Vaiea that currently competes in the Niue Soccer Tournament, the top tier competition on the island. The club plays its home matches at the Vaiea Ground. With eight league championships, it is Niue's most successful football club.

== History ==
After a long hiatus, the Niue Soccer Tournament was resurrected in 2021 under the newly formed Niue Football Association. Vaiea earned the championship that season.

Their 2025 men's MVP was Loe Kaufiti, whereas their women's was Alison Taliu.

== Honour ==
- Niue Soccer Tournament: 2010, 2011, 2012, 2015, 2021, 2022, 2023, 2025
