= Paliati Grounds =

National stadium of Niue

- Interactive map of Paliati Grounds
- Location: Alofi-Liku Road; Paliati, Niue
- Coordinates: 19.055371°S 169.917871°W
- Capacity: 1,000
- Surface: Natural Grass

Tenants
- Niue national rugby union team Niue national soccer team Niue Soccer Tournament

The Paliati Grounds (also known as the Niue High School Oval) is the multi-use national stadium of the Pacific Island nation of Niue. The stadium has a capacity of 1,000 spectators. It is located adjacent to the Niue High School and the Niue campus of the University of the South Pacific.

== Tenants ==
The Paliati Grounds hosts the Niue Soccer Tournament, the Niue national rugby union team, island rugby tournaments, and school athletics.
