= 2023–24 KTFF Süper Lig =

Süper Lig
- Season: 2023–24
- Dates: 21 September 2023 – 19 May 2024
- Champions: Mağusa Türk Gücü; 13th title
- Relegated: Küçük Kaymaklı; Yeniboğaziçi; Türk Ocağı Limasol
- Matches played: 246
- Goals scored: 902 (3.67 per match)
- Top goalscorer: (Turkey) Muhittin Tümbül (35 goals)

The 2023–24 KTFF Süper Lig season was the 62nd season of the Süper Lig in Northern Cyprus. Mağusa Türk Gücü were the reigning champions, winning their fifth successive title on the final day of the season.

== Format ==
The 2023–24 season was set to continue with the same format used the previous season. The two last teams were directly relegated to the 1. Lig, while qualified teams between the 11th and the 14th position played a relegation stage where the last qualified was also relegated.

== Teams ==
Location of 2023–24 KTFF Süper Lig teams in Northern Cyprus

A total of sixteen teams contest the league, including thirteen sides from the 2022–23 season and three promoted from the 2022–23 KTFF 1. Lig. This includes the two top teams from the 1. Lig, and the winners of the promotion play-offs.

Promoted from 2022–23 1. Lig	Relegated from 2022–23 Süper Lig
Karşıyaka; Yeniboğaziçi; Gençler Birliği	Hamitköy; Gönyeli; Değirmenlik

=== Stadiums and locations ===
Team	District	Stadium
Alsancak Yeşilova	Girne	Alsancak Mustafa Hidayet Çağlar Stadium
Cihangir	Lefkoşa	Cihangir Stadium
Çetinkaya	Lefkoşa	Lefkoşa Atatürk Stadium
Doğan Türk Birliği	Girne	Girne 20 Temmuz Mete Adanır Stadium
Dumlupınar	Gazimağusa	Dr. Fazıl Küçük Stadium
Gençler Birliği	İskele	İskele Cumhuriyet Stadium
Gençlik Gücü	Lefkoşa	Lefkoşa Atatürk Stadium
Göçmenköy İdman Yurdu	Lefkoşa	Göçmenköy Stadium
Karşıyaka Anamur	Girne	Lapta Şehit Şevket Kadir Stadium
Küçük Kaymaklı	Lefkoşa	Lefkoşa Şehit Hüseyin Ruso Stadium
Lefke	Lefke	August 16 Victory Stadium
Mağusa Türk Gücü	Gazimağusa	Gazimağusa Canbulat Stadium
Mesarya	Gazimağusa	Paşaköy Hasan Onalt Stadium
Türk Ocağı Limasol	Girne	Girne 20 Temmuz Mete Adanır Stadium
Yeniboğaziçi Doğan	Gazimağusa	Yeniboğaziçi Osman Ergün Mehmet Stadium
Yenicami Ağdelen	Lefkoşa	Lefkoşa Atatürk Stadium

== League table ==
Pos	Team	Pld	W	D	L	GF	GA	GD	Pts	Qualification or relegation
1	Mağusa Türk Gücü (C)	30	26	2	2	112	22	+90	80	
2	Cihangir	30	25	1	4	75	24	+51	76	
3	Dumlupınar	30	18	2	10	77	53	+24	56	
4	Göçmenköy	30	16	6	8	60	40	+20	54	
5	Doğan Türk Birliği	30	15	5	10	65	41	+24	50	
6	Karşıyaka	30	14	7	9	64	51	+13	49 (Note: Karşıyaka finished ahead of Çetinkaya on head-to-head goals: Karşıyaka, 5 goals; Çetinkaya, 3 goals.)	
7	Çetinkaya	30	15	4	11	65	50	+15	49	
8	Gençler Birliği	30	12	4	14	54	63	−9	40	
9	Lefke	30	11	6	13	37	42	−5	39 (Note: Lefke finished ahead Alsancak Yeşilova on goal difference: Lefke, –5; Alsancak Yeşilova, –9.)	
10	Alsancak Yeşilova	30	12	3	15	49	58	−9	39	
11	Yenicami Ağdelen (O)	30	11	5	14	50	57	−7	38	Qualification for the relegation stage
12	Gençlik Gücü (O)	30	10	5	15	57	60	−3	35	Qualification for the relegation stage
13	Mesarya (O)	30	10	2	18	37	62	−25	32 (Note: Mesarya finished ahead Küçük Kaymaklı on head-to-head goals: Mesarya, 3 goals; Küçük Kaymaklı, 2 goals.)	Qualification for the relegation stage
14	Küçük Kaymaklı (R)	30	10	2	18	35	64	−29	32	Qualification for the relegation stage
15	Yeniboğaziçi (R)	30	4	3	23	39	100	−61	15	Relegation to 1. Lig
16	Türk Ocağı Limasol (R)	30	1	3	26	26	115	−89	6	Relegation to 1. Lig

Source: RSSSF
Rules for classification: 1) Points; 2) Head-to-head points; 3) Head-to-head goal difference; 4) Overall goal difference.
(C) Champions; (O) Play-off winners; (R) Relegated

== Relegation stage ==
Teams qualified between the 11th and the 14th position played a latter stage to determine the third relegated team.

Pos	Team	Pld	W	D	L	GF	GA	GD	Pts	Relegation	GEG	YEN	MES	KKA
1	Gençlik Gücü	3	1	2	0	3	2	+1	23				2–1	0–0
2	Yenicami Ağdelen	3	0	3	0	4	4	0	22		1–1		1–1	1–1
3	Mesarya	3	1	1	1	3	3	0	20					1–0
4	Küçük Kaymaklı (R)	3	0	2	1	2	3	−1	18	Relegation to the 1. Lig				

Source: RSSSF
(R) Relegated

== Top scorers ==
Rank	Player	Club	Goals
1	(Turkey) Muhittin Tümbül	Cihangir	35
1	(Mauritania) Souleymane Doukara	Gönyeli	26
3	(Nigeria) Dinopeter Jude Airaodion	Mağusa Türk Gücü	20
4	(Cameroon) Danie Junior Adjessa	Dumlupınar	19
5	(Northern Cyprus) Mert Güçlucan	Dumlupınar	18
