= 2013–14 KTFF Süper Lig =

Süper Lig
- Season: 2013–14
- Dates: 28 September 2013 – 10 May 2014
- Champions: Yenicami Ağdelen; 6th title
- Top goalscorer: (Northern Cyprus) Esin Sonay (28 goals)

The 2013–14 KTFF Süper Lig season was the 54th season of the Süper Lig in Northern Cyprus. Yenicami Ağdelen achieved its 6th title overall, the first one 30 years after their last one.

== Format ==
The 2013–14 season was set to continue with the same format used the previous season. The two last teams were directly relegated to the 1. Lig, while qualified teams between the 9th and the 12th position played a relegation stage where the last qualified was also relegated.

== Teams ==
A total of fourteen teams contest the league, including eleven sides from the 2012–13 season and three promoted from the 2012–13 KTFF 1. Lig. This includes the two top teams from the 1. Lig, and the winner of the promotion play-offs.

Promoted from 2012–13 1. Lig	Relegated from 2012–13 Süper Lig
Yeniboğaziçi; Yalova; Mormenekşe	Lapta Türk Birliği; Türk Ocağı Limasol; Göçmenköy

== League table ==
Pos	Team	Pld	W	D	L	GF	GA	GD	Pts	Qualification or relegation
1	Yenicami Ağdelen (C)	26	20	3	3	76	16	+60	63	
2	Küçük Kaymaklı	26	20	2	4	82	23	+59	62	
3	Lefke	26	15	6	5	60	25	+35	51	
4	Çetinkaya	26	13	5	8	36	30	+6	44	
5	Doğan Türk Birliği	26	12	6	8	51	45	+6	42	
6	Cihangir	26	10	6	10	44	38	+6	36 (Note: Cihangir finished ahead of Mağusa Türk Gücü and Bostancı Bağcıl on head-to-head points: Cihangir, 8 points; Mağusa Türk Gücü, 7 points; Bostancı Bağcıl, 1 point.)	
7	Mağusa Türk Gücü	26	11	3	12	35	40	−5	36	
8	Bostancı Bağcıl	26	10	6	10	43	43	0	36	
9	Serdarlı (O)	26	9	8	9	33	36	−3	35 (Note: Serdarlı finished ahead of Mormenekşe on overall goal difference: Serdarlı , –3; Mormenekşe, –7.)	Qualification to relegation stage
10	Mormenekşe (O)	26	11	2	13	34	41	−7	35	Qualification to relegation stage
11	Hamitköy (R)	26	8	6	12	34	51	−17	30	Qualification to relegation stage
12	Yeniboğaziçi (O)	26	6	3	17	30	57	−27	21	Qualification to relegation stage
13	Yalova (R)	26	5	5	16	30	61	−31	20	Relegation to 1. Lig
14	Gençlik Gücü (R)	26	1	1	24	21	103	−82	4	Relegation to 1. Lig

Source: RSSSF
Rules for classification: 1) Points; 2) Head-to-head points; 3) Head-to-head goal difference; 4) Overall goal difference.
(C) Champions; (O) Play-off winners; (R) Relegated

== Relegation stage ==
Teams qualified between the 9th and the 12th position played a latter stage to determine the third relegated team.

Pos	Team	Pld	W	D	L	GF	GA	GD	Pts	Qualification	MOR	SER	YBO	HAM
1	Mormenekşe	2	1	1	0	6	3	+3	6				2–2	3–1
2	Serdarlı	2	0	2	0	2	2	0	5		—			1–1
3	Yeniboğaziçi (Q)	3	0	3	0	4	4	0	3	Qualification to relegation play-off		1–1		
4	Hamitköy (Q)	3	0	2	1	2	5	−3	3	Qualification to relegation play-off			1–1	

Source: RSSSF
(Q) Qualified for the phase indicated

=== Relegation play-off ===
10 May 2014

Hamitköy	1–1 (a.e.t.)	Yeniboğaziçi
Penalties
	5–6
