= List of top-division football clubs in CONMEBOL countries =

CONMEBOL countries on this map of the world's six football confederations

The South American Football Confederation (CONMEBOL) is the administrative and controlling body for association football in most of South America. It consists of 10 member associations, each of which is responsible for governing football in their respective countries. It includes all countries and territories within South America, with the exceptions of Guyana, French Guiana, Suriname, which are part of CONCACAF, and the disputed British and Argentine territory of the Falkland Islands, which is not a member of any confederation. Each CONMEBOL member has its own football league system. Clubs playing in each top-level league compete for the title as the country's club champion. Clubs also compete in the league and national cup competitions (if applicable) for places in the following season's CONMEBOL club competitions, the Copa Libertadores and Copa Sudamericana. Due to promotion and relegation, the clubs playing in the top-level league are different every season.

Club name	Club finished the previous season as the league champion.
Club name	Club won the most recent Apertura championship.
Club name	Club won the most recent Clausura championship.
Club name	Club won the most recent Apertura and Clausura championships.

For clubs playing at lower divisions, see the separate articles linked to in the relevant sections.

== Argentina ==
- Country: Argentina
- Football association: Argentine Football Association
- Top-level league: AFA Liga Profesional de Fútbol

The Primera División is the top level of Argentine football league, and is organized by the Argentine Football Association. Founded in 1893, it currently consists of 30 teams. The professional era started in 1931 when professionalism was instituted. Teams from Argentina have won the most international titles with a tally of 73, which includes 25 Copa Libertadores. Currently, the league is regarded as one of the strongest leagues in the world.

As of the 2026 season:

Locations of the 2026 Liga Profesional teams outside Greater Buenos Aires.
Locations of the 2026 Liga Profesional teams within Greater Buenos Aires.

Club	City
Aldosivi	Mar del Plata
Argentinos Juniors	Buenos Aires
Atlético Tucumán	Tucumán
Banfield	Banfield
Barracas Central	Buenos Aires
Belgrano	Córdoba
Boca Juniors	Buenos Aires
Central Córdoba (SdE)	Santiago del Estero
Defensa y Justicia	Florencio Varela
Deportivo Riestra	Buenos Aires
Estudiantes (LP)	La Plata
Estudiantes (RC)	Río Cuarto
Gimnasia y Esgrima (LP)	La Plata
Gimnasia y Esgrima (M)	Mendoza
Huracán	Buenos Aires
Independiente	Avellaneda
Independiente Rivadavia	Mendoza
Instituto	Córdoba
Lanús	Lanús
Newell's Old Boys	Rosario
Platense	Florida
Racing	Avellaneda
River Plate	Buenos Aires
Rosario Central	Rosario
San Lorenzo	Buenos Aires
Sarmiento (J)	Junín
Talleres (C)	Córdoba
Tigre	Victoria
Unión	Santa Fe
Vélez Sarsfield	Buenos Aires

== Bolivia ==
- Country: Bolivia
- Football association: Bolivian Football Federation
- Top-level league: FBF División Profesional

Bolivia's first division started in 1977 as the Liga de Fútbol Profesional Boliviano (English: Bolivian Professional Football League), though football had been played in Bolivia since the early 1900s, specially in La Paz and Oruro.

As of the 2026 season:

Locations of the 2026 División Profesional teams.

Club	City
ABB	El Alto
Always Ready	El Alto
Aurora	Cochabamba
Blooming	Santa Cruz de la Sierra
Bolívar	La Paz
Guabirá	Montero
GV San José	Oruro
Independiente Petrolero	Sucre
Nacional Potosí	Potosí
Oriente Petrolero	Santa Cruz de la Sierra
Real Oruro	Oruro
Real Potosí	Potosí
Real Tomayapo	Tarija
San Antonio Bulo Bulo	Entre Ríos
The Strongest	La Paz
Universitario de Vinto	Vinto

== Brazil ==
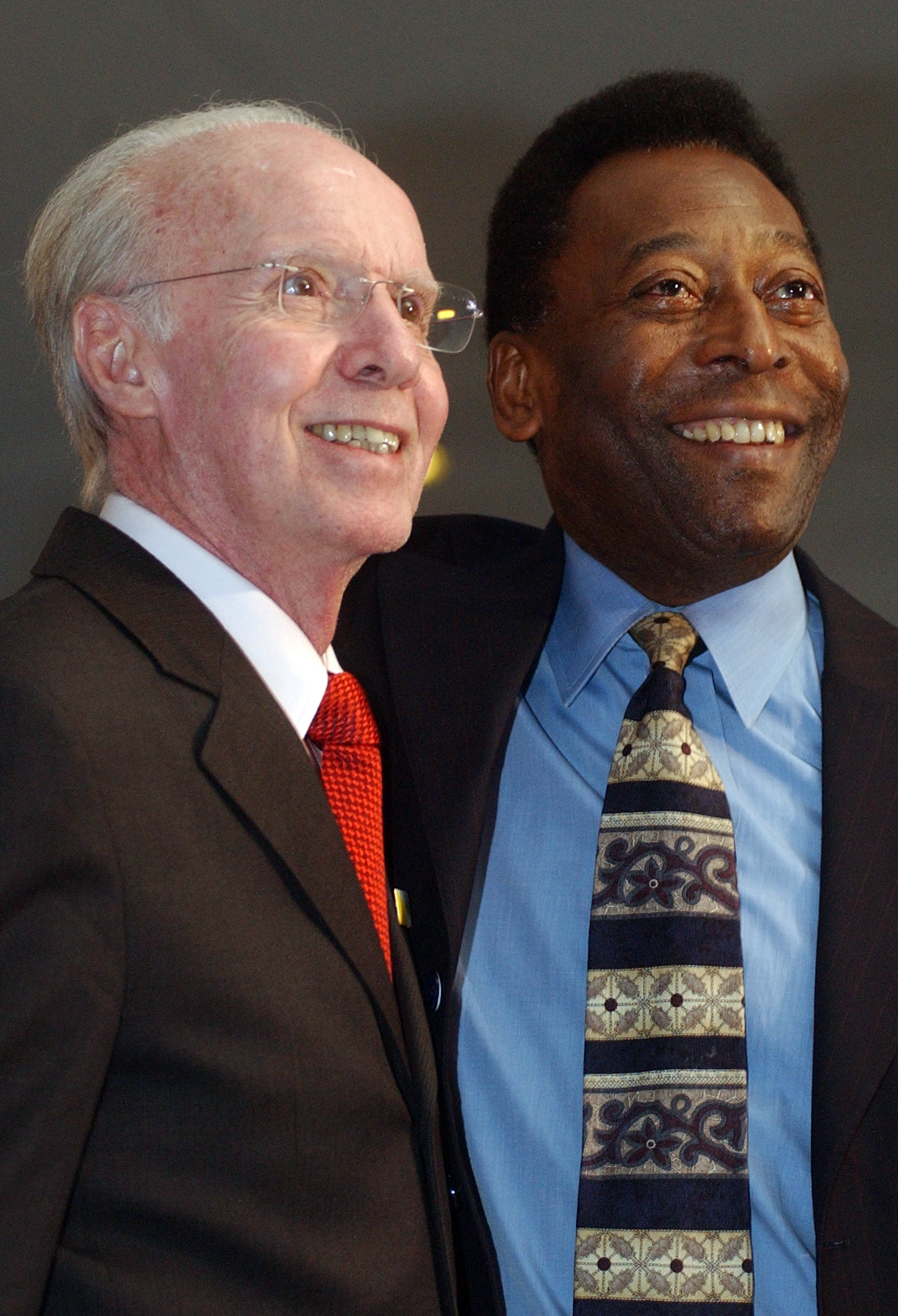
Three-time FIFA World Cup winners Mário Zagallo and Pelé both spent the majority of their careers in Brazil.

- Country: Brazil
- Football association: Brazilian Football Confederation
- Top-level league: Campeonato Brasileiro Série A

Campeonato Brasileiro was created in 1959 as a knockout tournament between state champions. From 1967 to 1987 the best clubs of each state championships were separated in several groups with final play-offs or a final group stage. Every year some aspects of format, number of entrants and rules were changed. Promotion and relegation rules were adopted in 1988, and since 2003 a double round robin format is played every year from May to December.

As of the 2026 season:

Location of teams in 2026 Série A

Club	City
Athletico Paranaense	Curitiba
Atlético Mineiro	Belo Horizonte
Bahia	Salvador
Botafogo	Rio de Janeiro
Chapecoense	Chapecó
Corinthians	São Paulo
Coritiba	Curitiba
Cruzeiro	Belo Horizonte
Flamengo	Rio de Janeiro
Fluminense	Rio de Janeiro
Grêmio	Porto Alegre
Internacional	Porto Alegre
Mirassol	Mirassol
Palmeiras	São Paulo
Red Bull Bragantino	Bragança Paulista
Remo	Belém
Santos	Santos
São Paulo	São Paulo
Vasco da Gama	Rio de Janeiro
Vitória	Salvador

== Chile ==
Locations of the 2026 Liga de Primera teams.
- Country: Chile
- Football association: Chilean Football Federation
- Top-level league: Liga de Primera

The Primera División del Fútbol Profesional Chileno was founded on January 24, 1926. As of 2025, the league is known as Liga de Primera Itaú due to sponsorship by Brazilian bank Itaú.

As of the 2026 season:

Club	City (Commune)
Audax Italiano	Santiago (La Florida)
Cobresal	El Salvador
Colo-Colo	Santiago (Macul)
Coquimbo Unido	Coquimbo
Deportes Concepción	Concepción
Deportes La Serena	La Serena
Deportes Limache	Limache
Everton	Viña del Mar
Huachipato	Talcahuano
Ñublense	Chillán
O'Higgins	Rancagua
Palestino	Santiago (La Cisterna)
Unión La Calera	La Calera
Universidad Católica	Santiago (Las Condes)
Universidad de Chile	Santiago (Ñuñoa)
Universidad de Concepción	Concepción

== Colombia ==
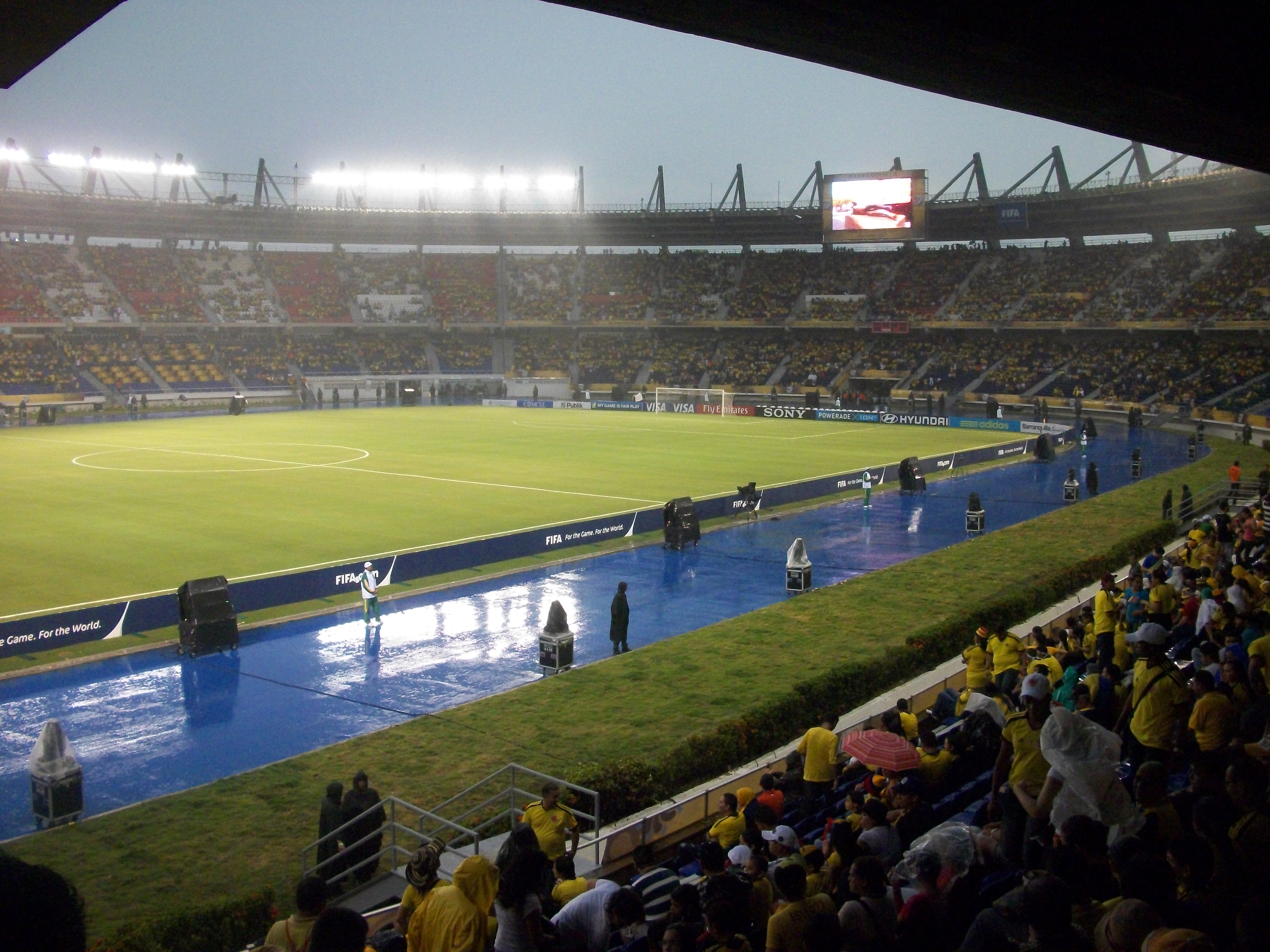
Estadio Metropolitano Roberto Meléndez, home of Junior and the Colombia national team.

- Country: Colombia
- Football association: Colombian Football Federation
- Top-level league: Liga DIMAYOR

The Categoría Primera A has been in existence since 1948. As of 2025, online betting company BetPlay sponsors the league, which is currently called Liga BetPlay Dimayor.

As of the 2026 season:

Locations of the 2026 Liga DIMAYOR teams

Club	City
Águilas Doradas	Rionegro
Alianza	Valledupar
América de Cali	Cali
Atlético Bucaramanga	Bucaramanga
Atlético Nacional	Medellín
Boyacá Chicó	Tunja
Cúcuta Deportivo	Cúcuta
Deportes Tolima	Ibagué
Deportivo Cali	Cali
Deportivo Pasto	Pasto
Deportivo Pereira	Pereira
Fortaleza	Bogotá
Independiente Medellín	Medellín
Internacional de Bogotá	Bogotá
Jaguares	Montería
Junior	Barranquilla
Llaneros	Villavicencio
Millonarios	Bogotá
Once Caldas	Manizales
Santa Fe	Bogotá

== Ecuador ==
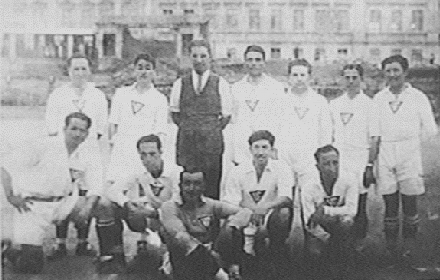
LDU Quito in 1930.

Locations of the 2026 Serie A clubs.
- Country: Ecuador
- Football association: Ecuadorian Football Federation
- Top-level league: Serie A

The Serie A has its roots in the national championship between the top teams of Ecuador's two regional leagues. Since the first tournament in 1957, a national champion has been crowned 51 times on a yearly basis (except 1958 & 1959), and twice in 2005. Starting from the 2010 season a new format consisting of three stages was used. This format lasted until 2018, when it was decided that the league would expand from 12 to 16 teams.

As of the 2026 season:

Club	City
Aucas	Quito
Barcelona	Guayaquil
Delfín	Manta
Deportivo Cuenca	Cuenca
Emelec	Guayaquil
Guayaquil City	Guayaquil
Independiente del Valle	Sangolquí
LDU Quito	Quito
Leones	Atuntaqui
Libertad	Loja
Macará	Ambato
Manta	Manta
Mushuc Runa	Ambato
Orense	Machala
Técnico Universitario	Ambato
Universidad Católica	Quito

== Paraguay ==
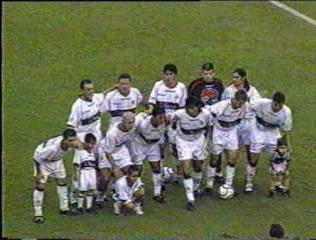
Club Olimpia.

- Country: Paraguay
- Football association: Paraguayan Football Association
- Top-level league: División de Honor

Liga Paraguaya's first game was played in 1906. It joined CONMEBOL in 1921, and FIFA in 1925. The professional era of the competition in the Liga started in 1941. During the 1990s, the FA changed its denomination from Liga Paraguaya del Fútbol to Asociación Paraguaya de Fútbol.

As of the 2026 season:

Locations of the 2026 División de Honor teams

Club	City
2 de Mayo	Pedro Juan Caballero
Cerro Porteño	Asunción
Guaraní	Asunción
Libertad	Asunción
Nacional	Asunción
Olimpia	Asunción
Recoleta	Asunción
Rubio Ñu	Asunción
San Lorenzo	San Lorenzo
Sportivo Ameliano	Villeta
Sportivo Luqueño	Luque
Sportivo Trinidense	Asunción

== Peru ==
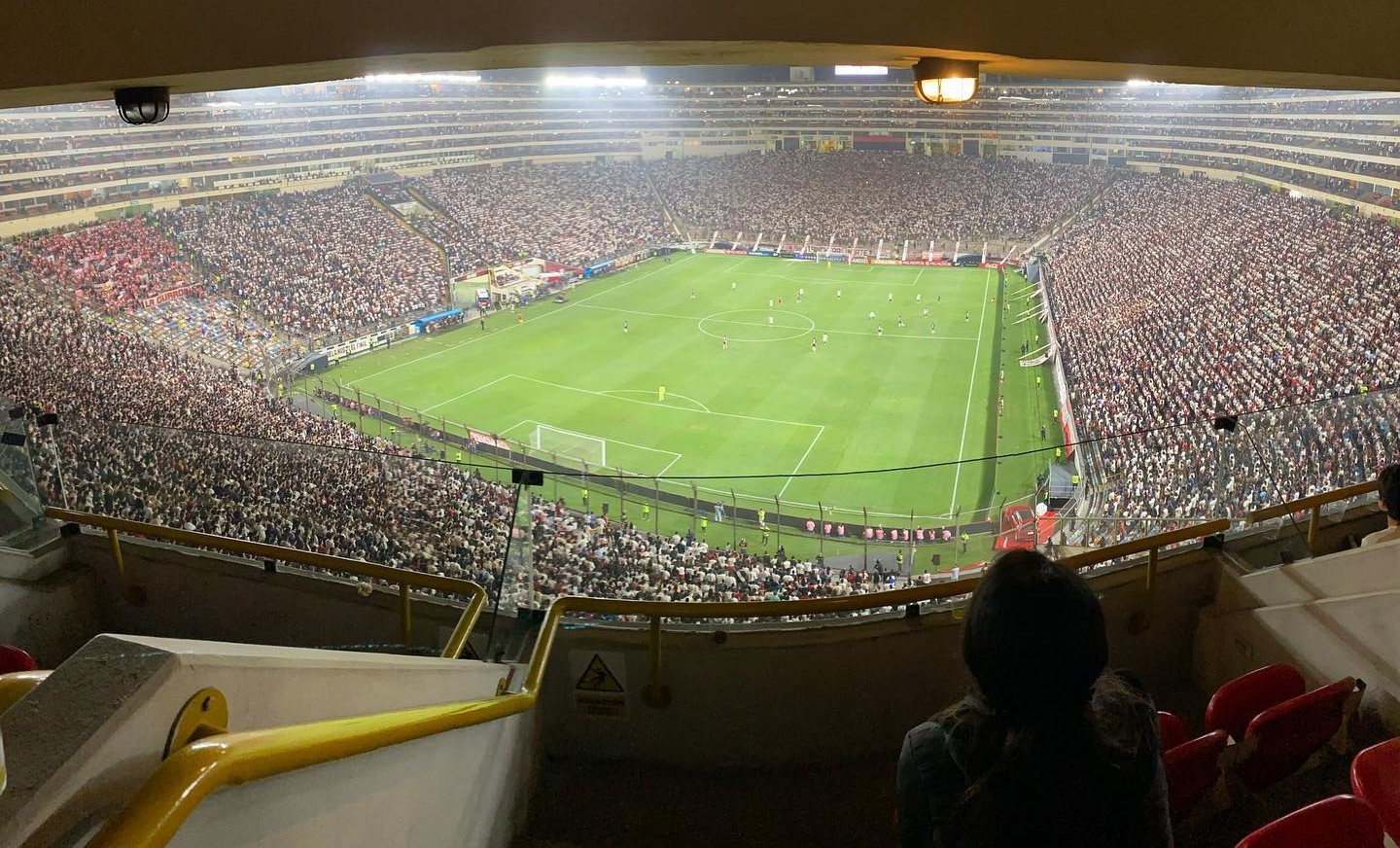
Estadio Monumental "U", home of Universitario de Deportes.

Locations of the 2026 Liga 1 teams
- Country: Peru
- Football association: Peruvian Football Federation
- Top-level league: Liga 1

The Liga Peruana de Football (Peruvian Football League) was first founded in 1912 and organized the Primera División, as well as the Segunda División, until 1921. Due to disagreements in the organization of the Liga Peruana de Football, the Peruvian Football Federation was founded in 1922 and organized its first league in 1926. In 1941 the Asociación No Amateur took the stand as the league's organizer and renamed the league Campeonato de Selección y Competencia.

As of the 2026 season:

Club	City
ADT	Tarma
Alianza Atlético	Sullana
Alianza Lima	Lima
Atlético Grau	Piura
Cajamarca	Cajamarca
Cienciano	Cusco
Comerciantes Unidos	Cutervo
Cusco	Cusco
Deportivo Garcilaso	Cusco
Deportivo Moquegua	Moquegua
Juan Pablo II College	Trujillo
Los Chankas	Andahuaylas
Melgar	Arequipa
Sport Boys	Callao
Sport Huancayo	Huancayo
Sporting Cristal	Lima
Universitario	Lima
UTC	Cajamarca

== Uruguay ==
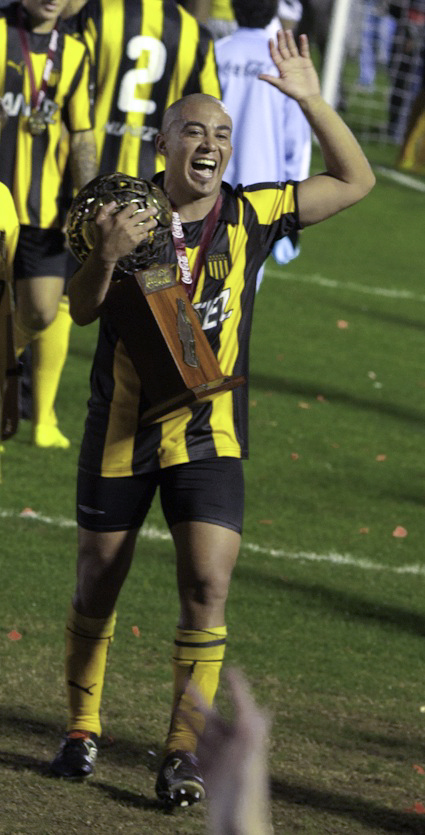
Egidio Arévalo Ríos.

Locations of the 2026 season teams outside Montevideo.
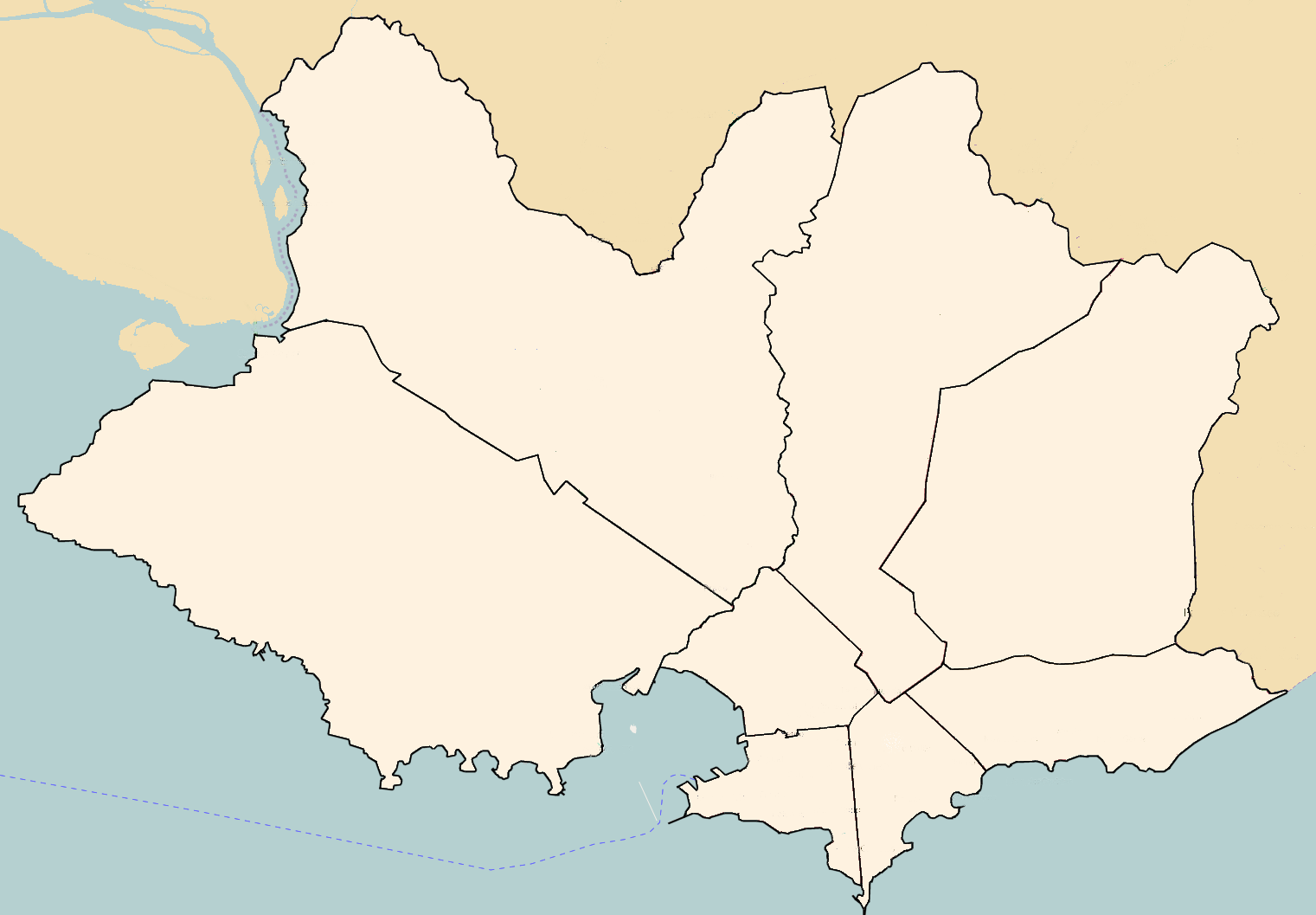
Locations of the 2026 season teams within Montevideo.
- Country: Uruguay
- Football association: Uruguayan Football Association
- Top-level league: Liga AUF Uruguaya

Liga Profesional de Primera División, the top-flight professional football league in Uruguay, was founded in 1900 and is currently contested by 16 teams. In 2016, the league underwent a transition from the European calendar to a year calendar, which is used from the 2017 season onwards.

As of the 2026 season:

Club	City
Albion	Montevideo
Boston River	Montevideo
Central Español	Montevideo
Cerro	Montevideo
Cerro Largo	Melo
Danubio	Montevideo
Defensor Sporting	Montevideo
Deportivo Maldonado	Maldonado
Juventud	Las Piedras
Liverpool	Montevideo
Montevideo City Torque	Montevideo
Montevideo Wanderers	Montevideo
Nacional	Montevideo
Peñarol	Montevideo
Progreso	Montevideo
Racing	Montevideo

== Venezuela ==
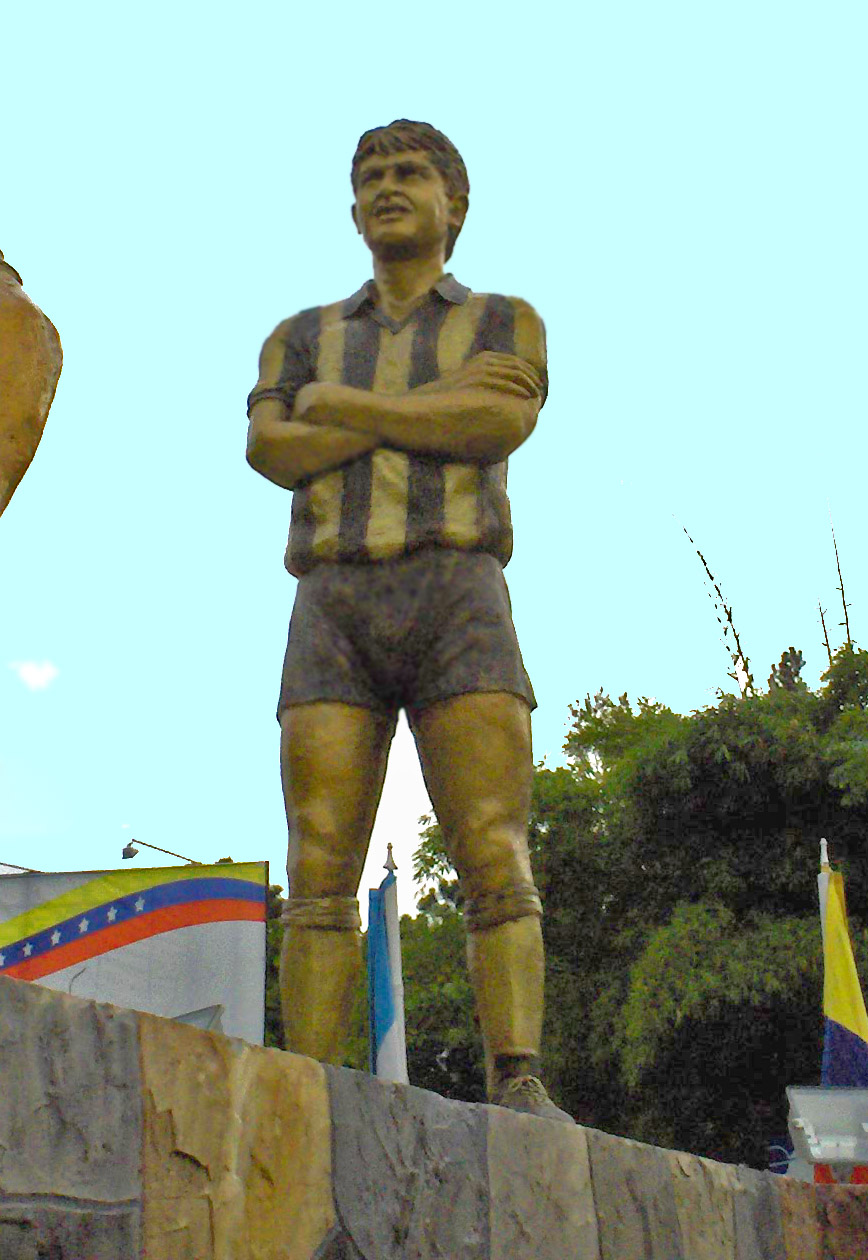
Carlos Fabián Maldonado.

Locations of the 2026 Liga FUTVE teams
- Country: Venezuela
- Football association: Venezuelan Football Federation
- Top-level league: Liga FUTVE

The Primera División was created in 1921 and turned professional in 1957. The 2016 season consisted of 20 clubs, a number that was reduced to 18 for the following season. As of the 2025 season, the number of clubs is 14.

As of the 2026 season:

Club	City
Academia Puerto Cabello	Puerto Cabello
Anzoátegui	Puerto La Cruz
Carabobo	Valencia
Caracas	Caracas
Deportivo La Guaira	Caracas
Deportivo Táchira	San Cristóbal
Estudiantes de Mérida	Mérida
Metropolitanos	Caracas
Monagas	Maturín
Portuguesa	Acarigua
Rayo Zuliano	Maracaibo
Trujillanos	Valera
Universidad Central	Caracas
Zamora	Barinas

== See also ==
- List of top-division football clubs in AFC countries
- List of top-division football clubs in CAF countries
- List of top-division football clubs in CONCACAF countries
- List of top-division football clubs in OFC countries
- List of top-division football clubs in UEFA countries
- List of top-division football clubs in non-FIFA countries
