= Leokaneng =

- Location within Limpopo Location within South Africa
- Coordinates: 23.524°S 28.990°E
- Country: South Africa
- Province: Limpopo
- District: Capricorn
- Municipality: Blouberg

Area
  - Total: 1.76 km^{2} (0.68 sq mi)
- Elevation: 1,086 m (3,563 ft)

Population (2011)
  - Total: 1,436
  - Density: 816/km^{2} (2,110/sq mi)

Racial makeup (2011)
  - Black African: 99.9%
  - Coloured: 0.1%
  - Indian/Asian: 0.1%

First languages (2011)
  - Northern Sotho: 98.3%
  - Tswana: 1.0%
  - Other: 0.7%
- Time zone: UTC+2 (SAST)
- Postal code (street): 0748
- PO box: 0702
- Area code: +27 (0)15

Leokaneng is a large village in Moletši in the Blouberg Local Municipality of the Capricorn District Municipality of the Limpopo province of South Africa. It is located 64 km northwest of Polokwane and 39 km southeast of Senwabarwana.

== Education ==
- Mašiane High School
- Leokaneng Primary School

There is no institution of higher learning in Leokaneng. The majority of successful matriculants opt for the University of Limpopo's Turfloop Campus to further their studies, while others opt for universities based in Gauteng.

== Sports ==
Football (soccer) is the most popular sport in Leokaneng. There are three football clubs, which are:

- Leokaneng Chiefs F.C.
- Stone F.C.

Netball is most popular among teenage girls and young women. However, currently the netball teams in the village are defunct. It is not clear as to what exactly led to this occurrence.
