= Niue national soccer team =

National association football team

Niue
- Association: Niue Football Association
- Confederation: OFC (affiliate until 2021)
- Most caps: Bradley Punu; Brandy Falepeau; Colin Ikinepule; Deve Talagi; Foli Ikitule; Lamosa Sionetuato; Lefulefu Hipa; Lopesi Sehina; Speedo Hetutu; Tea Konelio; Tahafa Talagi (2)
- FIFA code: NIU
First colours	Second colours

First international
- Tahiti 14–0 Niue (Apia, Western Samoa; 20 August 1983)

Biggest win
- None

Biggest defeat
- Niue 0–19 Papua New Guinea (Apia, Western Samoa; 22 August 1983)

Pacific Games
- Appearances: 1 (first in 1983)
- Best result: Group stage (1983)

The Niue national soccer team was the national soccer team of Niue, an associated state of New Zealand. It played its only two games at the 1983 South Pacific Games.

== History ==
The team played its only international games at the 1983 South Pacific Games. A 0–14 loss to Tahiti was followed by a 0–19 loss to Papua New Guinea.

The Niue Island Soccer Association was an associate member of the Oceania Football Confederation (OFC) until its membership was revoked in 2021 due to inactivity. Because it was not a FIFA member, the team was already ineligible to enter the World Cup even when it was still an OFC member.

The first official 11 v 11 match in several years was announced for November 2023. The match will be a representative team of the south vs the north of Niue.

== All International Results ==
Niue score is shown first in each case.

No.	Date	Venue	Opponents	Score	Competition	Niue scorers	Att.	Ref.
1	20 August 1983	Apia (N)	Tahiti	0–14	1983 South Pacific Games		—	
2	22 August 1983	Apia (N)	Papua New Guinea	0–19	1983 South Pacific Games		—	

=== Record by opponent ===
Team	Pld	W	D	L	GF	GA	GD	WPCT
Papua New Guinea	1	0	0	1	0	19	−19	0.00
Tahiti	1	0	0	1	0	14	−14	0.00
Total	2	0	0	2	0	33	−33	0.00

Source: Complete International Results

== Players ==
See List of Niue international footballers.
