= Wailes =

Wailes is a surname. Notable people with the surname include:

- Alexandria Wailes, American actress
- Andrew Wailes (born 1971), Australian conductor
- Benjamin L. C. Wailes (1797–1862), American planter and writer
- Edward T. Wailes (1903–1969), American diplomat
- Kyle Wailes (born 1983), Canadian lacrosse player
- Rex Wailes (1901–1986), English engineer and historian
- Rusty Wailes (1936–2002), American rower
- William Wailes (1808–1881), English stained glass manufacturer
