= List of football clubs in Kiribati =

This is a list of football clubs in Kiribati.

- Kuria
- Maiana
- Marakei
- Nonouti
- Tamana
- Tarawa Urban Council
- Abaiang
- Abemama
- Betio Town Council
- Makin
- Tabiteuea North
- Tabiteuea South
- Banaba
- Beru
- Kiritimati
- North Tarawa
- Onotoa
- Aranuka
- Arorae
- Butaritari
- Tabuaeran
- Teraina
