= Niue Island Soccer Association =

- Short name: NISA
- Founded: 1960
- Folded: 2021
- FIFA affiliation: N/A

The Niue Island Soccer Association (NISA) was the governing body of soccer in Niue. It organised the nation's league, the Niue Soccer Tournament, as well as Niue's own national team.

Between 2006 and 2021 the NISA was an associate member of the Oceania Football Confederation. Membership was revoked following a decade of inactivity, although it was suggested that a new organisation would be established. It has since been replaced by the Niue Football Association as the governing body on the island.

== Teams / Tournaments ==
- Niue national soccer team

The NISA oversaw the Niue national football team in 1983 when the national side started, losing 19-0 to Papua New Guinea.

- Niue Soccer Tournament

The NISA also organised the Niue soccer league each year.
