= Niue High School =

Secondary school in Alofi, Niue

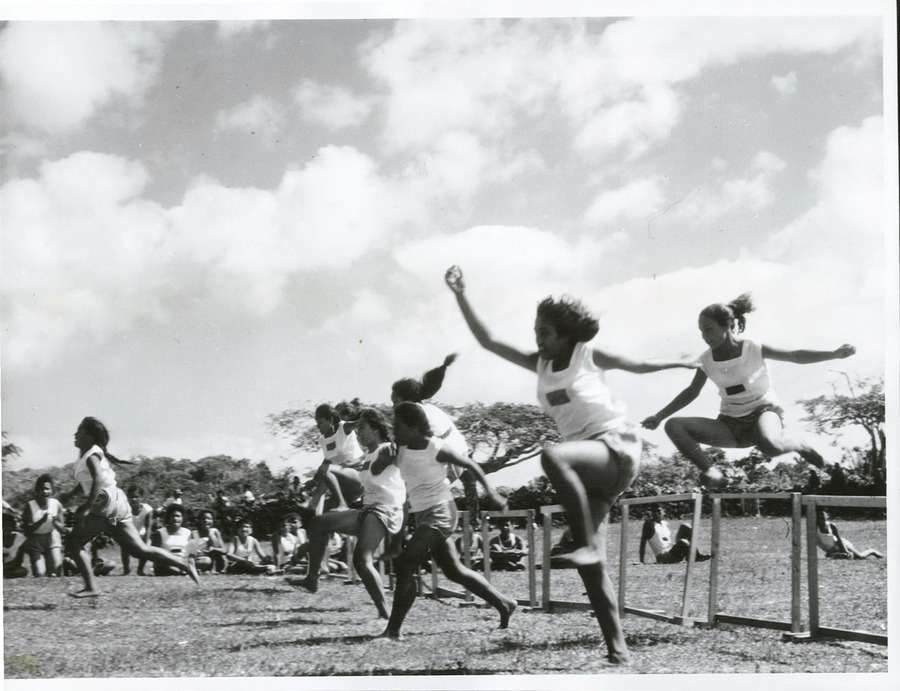
- Niue High School students running 100 metres hurdles, 1966
- Alofi; Niue

Information
- Years: 7-13
- Age: 11 to 18
- Enrollment: 175 (2010)

Niue High School (Mata Ki Luga) is a secondary school in Alofi, the capital city of Niue. It is located on the Alofi-Liku Road and, as of 2010, has 175 students in attendance. The school caters for years 7 to 13 (ages 11–18). Within the school is the Paliati Grounds, which reportedly has a capacity of 1,000 and is where Niuean association football teams play. It is the only secondary school in Niue, located in the capital, Alofi.

== History ==
Niue High School is the only secondary school on Niue. Secondary education on the island reportedly began in 1956 with the creation of the school. Public education is free and compulsory up to age 16, and since 1989 the school has been fed by a single combined early childhood and primary school in Alofi.

According to the Niue Statistics Office, the school had 279 students and 25 teachers in 1990, and enrolment peaked at 329 in 1994 among the years reported before falling to 268 in 1999, 259 in 2000 and 202 in 2005, when it had 32 teachers. Its student-teacher ratio fell from 11 to 1 in 1990 to 6 to 1 in 2005. The school adopted the New Zealand Qualifications Framework and the National Certificate of Educational Achievement in the early 2000s, bringing its qualifications into line with those of New Zealand.

== Anti-bullying campaign ==
The school also has an anti-bullying campaign, which has been around since 2002. It focuses on bullying along with human rights.

== Sports ==
In August 2023, a futsal competition was held in which the school entered a team for the men’s competition. The school finished outside the top four.
