= List of Niue international footballers =

The following is a list of footballers who have represented Niue in senior international matches.

== Key ==
Positions key
GK	Goalkeeper
DF	Defender
MF	Midfielder
FW	Forward

Position
Playing positions are listed according to the player's preferred position, and not based on tactical formations that were employed at the time.
Caps and goals
Caps and goals are composed of required qualification matches, as well as numerous international friendly tournaments and matches.

== Players ==
List is incomplete as of 23 December 2022.

Player	Birth Date	Position	Caps	Goals
Bradley Punu			2	0
Brandy Falepeau			2	0
Colin Ikinepule			2	0
Deve Talagi			2	0
Foli Ikitule			2	0
Lamosa Sionetuato			2	0
Lefulefu Hipa			2	0
Lopesi Sehina			2	0
Speedo Hetutu			2	0
Tea Konelio			2	0
Tahafa Talagi			2	0
