= Joseph Obidiaso =

Nigerian footballer

Personal information
- Full name: Joseph Chukwudi Obidiaso
- Date of birth: 20 September 1992 (age 34)
- Place of birth: Orlu, Nigeria
- Height: 1.85 m (6 ft 1 in)
- Positions: Centre forward; striker

Team information
- Current team: Al Sadd Benghazi SC
- Number: 9

Youth career
- 2004–2006: Chedeks
- 2006–2010: Ambek FC

Senior career*
Years	Team	Apps	(Gls)
2010–2012	Olimpia Bălți		
2013–2014	Ambek Football Club	21	(12)
2014–2015	Kufa FC	18	(10)
2015–2016	Bostancı Bağcıl	26	(2)
2016–2019	Baf Ülkü Yurdu	93	(60)
2019–	Göçmenköy İ.Y.S.K.	17	(8)
2021–2022	Mesarya Spor Kulübu	13	(5)
2022–	Tuwaiq	8	(3)
2022–2023	Al Tayaran Benina	18	(7)
2023–2024	Al Karamah SC	15	(6)
2024-2025	Al Sadd Benghazi SC	10	(7)
- * Club domestic league appearances and goals as of 3 March 2019

Joseph Chukwudi Obidiaso // (born 20 September 1992 in Orlu, Imo State) is a Nigerian professional football centre forward or winger, who currently plays for Al-Sadd Benghazi SC in the Libya first division League.

== Career ==
Obidiaso started his career in Nigeria 2004–2006, at Chedeks and moved to Ambek FC. In January 2010 he transferred to Olimpia Bălți, where he signed a 2-year contract. He then moved back to Nigeria and finalized a short term deal at Ambek Football Club.

Obidiaso was signed by Iraqi Premier League club Kufa FC in 2014. He played until January 2015, when he got an offer from in the Northern Cyprus super Lig side Bostancı Bağcıl for one season.
