= Niue Soccer Tournament =

- Founded: 1985
- Country: Niue
- Confederation: OFC associated (Affiliate until 2021)
- Level on pyramid: 1
- Most championships: Vaiea United FC (3 titles)

Niue Soccer Tournament is the top soccer division in Niue on an amateur basis. It was organised by the Niue Island Soccer Association, which as of 2021 had been defunct for a decade.

== Competing clubs ==
Name	2025 Men's	2025 Women's	Men's MVP	Women's MVP
Alofi "A"	2nd	4th	Chris Skinner	Ricmore Vea
Alofi "B"	3rd	–	Lio	–
Hakupu "A"	5th	2nd	Troy Tatui	Lati Ligadua
Hakupu "B"	4th	–	Jack Feleti	–
Lady Makos	–	1st	–	Carolyn Tukuniu
Vaiea	1st	3rd	Loe Kaufiti	Alison Taliu

== Notable players ==
- Jesse Koorey-Slow - former amateur player in New Zealand with Miramar Rangers who won 2025 Men's overall MVP with Alofi.

== Previous winners ==
Seven different clubs have won titles across all editions.

- 1985: Alofi FC
- 1998: Lakepa FC
- 1999: Talava FC
- 2000: Talava
- 2001: Alofi
- 2004: Talava
- 2005: Talava
- 2010: Vaiea United
- 2011: Vaiea Sting
- 2012: Vaiea Sting
- 2015: Vaiea FC
- 2018: Alofi Barrel Sport
- 2019: Alofi Barrel Sport
- 2021: Vaiea United FC
- 2022: Vaiea United FC
- 2023: Vaiea United FC
- 2025: Vaiea United FC

The following clubs have won at least 1 championship (prior to 1998):

- Hakupu
- Tuapa
- Tamakakautonga
