= Dumlupınar TSK =

Association football club in Northern Cyprus

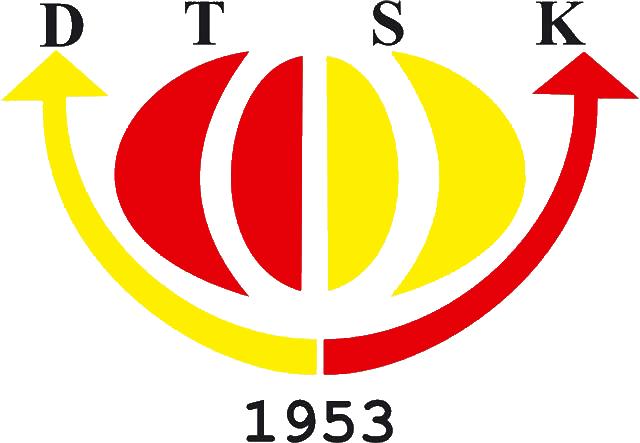
Logo of the Cyprusian Turkish football club Dumlupınar TSK.

Dumlupınar TSK is a Turkish Cypriot football club based in Famagusta, Northern Cyprus. It competes in the KTFF Super Lig, the highest level of league football in Northern Cyprus. The club was founded in 1953.

== History ==
In 2016, Dumlupınar TSK formed a consortium with NorthernLand, a local construction company.

Back in 2014, it became the first Turkish Cypriot club to participate in a tournament held in southern part of the island where it fielded it youth teams from the Under-9 to Under-15 categories.

== Latest seasons ==
Season	Tier	Division	Place	Cypriot Cup
2009–10	3	3. Lig	1st	
2010–11	2	1. Lig		Round of 32
2011–12	2	1. Lig	11th	Round of 32
2012–13	2	1. Lig	9th	Round of 32
2013–14	1	Süper Lig	6th	Round of 32
2014–15	2	1. Lig	9th	Round of 32
2015–16	2	1. Lig	1st	Round of 32
2016–17	1	Süper Lig	15th	Round of 16
2017–18	2	1. Lig	5th	Round of 16
2018–19	2	1. Lig	8th	Semi-finals

Season	Tier	Division	Place	Cypriot Cup
2019–20	2	1. Lig	2nd	Round of 32
2020–21	Season suspended			
2021–22	1	Süper Lig	9th	Quarter-finals
2022–23	1	Süper Lig	6th	Round of 16
2023–24	1	Süper Lig	3rd	Semi-finals
2024–25	1	Süper Lig	9th	Semi-finals
