= John Okoye Ebuka =

Nigerian footballer

Personal information
- Full name: John Okoye Ebuka
- Date of birth: 12 November 1996 (age 30)
- Place of birth: Nigeria
- Height: 1.76 m (5 ft 9 in)
- Position: Striker

Team information
- Current team: Al Masry SC
- Number: 23

Senior career*
Years	Team	Apps	(Gls)
2015	Novi Pazar	3	(0)
2016–2019	Yenicami	104	(121)
2019–2020	Hamitköy	15	(22)
2020	Yenicami	21	(29)
2020–2022	ENPPI		
2022–2025	Ceramica Cleopatra		
2023	→ Al Ahli SC (Tripoli) (loan)	14	(9)
2025–	Al Masry SC		
- * Club domestic league appearances and goals as of 20:32, 2 November 2020 (UTC)

John Okoye Ebuka (born 12 November 1996) is a Nigerian football forward who plays for Al Masry SC in the Egyptian Premier League.

== Career ==
Ebuka made his official debut for Novi Pazar in the 15th fixture of 2015–16 Serbian SuperLiga under coach Mladen Dodić in away lost against Radnik Surdulica, played on 24 October 2015.

He signed in summer of 2016 with Yenicami Ağdelen S.K. in the KTFF Süper Lig and at winter-break, his team were the league leaders and Okoye Ebuka was the league top-scorer with 21 goals.

His goalscoring continued the following season, and in 2016–17 he scored 41 goals.

== Honours ==
=== Club ===
Yenicami ASK

- KTFF Süper Lig: 2016–17, 2017–18

Al Ahli Tripoli

- Libyan Premier League: 2022–23
- Libyan Cup: 2022–23

=== Personal ===
- KTFF Süper Lig top-scorer: 2016–17 (41 goals), 2017–18 (33 goals)

== Career statistics ==
As of 7 November 2015

Club performance			League		Cup		Continental		Total	
Season	Club	League	Apps	Goals	Apps	Goals	Apps	Goals	Apps	Goals
2015–16	Novi Pazar	SuperLiga	3	0	1	0	–		4	0
Career total			3	0	1	0	0	0	4	0
