= Ozanköy S.K. =

Sports club in Northern Cyprus

- Full name: Ozanköy Spor Kulübü
- Nickname: Ozanköy
- Founded: 1956
- Ground: Ozanköy Mustafa Özkayım Stadı; Ozanköy, Turkish Republic of Northern Cyprus
- Capacity: 10,000
- League: Birinci Lig
- 2005-06: Birinci Lig, 1st - League Champion

Ozanköy Spor Kulübü is a Turkish Cypriot sports club based in Ozanköy, Kyrenia.

== Colors ==
The club colors are red and white.

== Stadium ==
The club's home stadium is Ozanköy Stadı, which can hold up to 10,000 spectators.

== Notable players ==
- (Northern Cyprus) Guy Massamba N'Sakala
