= Niue Football Association =

Sports governing body in Niue

OFC
- Founded: 2021; 5 years ago
- FIFA affiliation: N/A
- OFC affiliation: N/A
- President: Ricky Makani

The Niue Football Association is the governing body of association football on Niue. The association was founded in 2021 as a successor to the now-defunct Niue Island Soccer Association.

== History ==
In March 2021, following ten years of inactivity, the Niue Island Soccer Association was removed as an associate member of the Oceania Football Confederation for violations of multiple federation statutes. However, at the time of the announcement an OFC official indicated that they were aware of the formation of the new Niue Football Association and welcomed its application for associate membership.

In summer 2021 the NFA held its inaugural seven-a-side football season on the island with Deve Talagi, former vice-president of the NISA, serving as the organisation's president. The team from Vaiea won the first two editions of the men’s and women’s tournaments.

In February 2022 the association unveiled its new logo, created by local designer Fakaaue lahi Tom Jnr Misikea with funding support from the government of Niue.

In August 2023, winners were announced from a futsal men’s and women’s tournament. Vaiea were the champions of both tournaments. The first official 11v11 match in several years was also announced for November 2023. The match will be a representative team of the south vs the north of Niue.

In 2024 there were also tournaments for kids in the ages from 5 to 8 years and 9 to 12 years. Both tournaments were won by teams from Alofi.

By October 2024, the association had plans to review its constitution and pass it at its next general meeting and reapply for association membership in the OFC by 2025 following a resurgence in popularity of the sport on the island.

The association unveiled its new kit produced by French sportswear producer Insula Sportiva in April 2025. Later that year, the association organised a Kickstarter campaign with the goal of returning to international football and competing in the 2027 Pacific Games.

== National football stadium ==
Stadium	Capacity	City
Paliati Grounds	1,000	Paliati
