= Bostancı Bağcıl S.K. =

Association football club in Northern Cyprus

- Founded: 1986; 39 years ago
- Ground: Bostancı Yakup Ozorun Stadı
- Capacity: 800

Bostancı Bağcıl Spor Kulübü is a Northern Cypriot football club based in Zodeia, Morphou/Omorfo. It was founded in 1986.

== Colours ==
The club colours are white and green.

== Stadium ==
The club's home stadium is Bostancı Yakup Ozorun Stadı.
