= Esentepe K.K.S.K. =

Association football club in Northern Cyprus

Esentepe
- Full name: Esentepe Spor Kulübü
- Founded: 1976
- Ground: Esentepe Stadı, Kyrenia
- Capacity: 1,500
- Chairman: (Northern Cyprus) Barkın Arslan
- Head Coach: (Northern Cyprus) Tayfun K
- League: Süper Lig
Home colours	Away colours

Esentepe Spor Kulübü is a Turkish Cypriot sports club based in Esentepe, Kyrenia. Founded in 1976, the club currently plays in the Süper Lig, having earned promotion at the end of the 2017–2018 season. Esentepe is renowned for its youth team.

== Colors ==
The club colors are red and white.

== Stadium ==
The club's home stadium is Erdal Barut Esentepe Stadı.
