= Gençler Birliği S.K. =

Association football club in Northern Cyprus

Gençler Birliği SK
- Full name: Larnaka Gençler Birliği SK
- Founded: 1934; 92 years ago
- Stadium: İskele Cumhuriyet Stadyumu
- Chairman: (Northern Cyprus) Mustafa Gülcan
- Head Coach: (Northern Cyprus) Aydın Çırakoğlu
- League: KTFF Süper Lig

Gençler Birliği SK is a sports club based in Trikomo, Northern Cyprus. The club was founded in 1934 in Larnaca. For a small period, the team's name was Demi Spor Larnaca. The team plays in İskele Cumhuriyet Stadyumu.
