= Yeniboğaziçi D.S.K. =

Sports club in Northern Cyprus

Yeni Boğaziçi Spor Kulübü is a Turkish Cypriot sports club established in 1933 and based in Ayios Seryios, Northern Cyprus.

== Stadium ==
The club's home stadium is Yeni Boğaziçi Stadı.
