= 2009–10 TFF 1. Lig =

47th season of second-tier football league in Turkey

1. Lig
- Season: 2009–10
- Champions: Karabük
- Promoted: Karabük, Buca
- Relegated: Hacettepe, Ç. Dardanel, Kocaeli
- Matches played: 306
- Goals scored: 780 (2.55 per match)
- Top goalscorer: Yasin Avcı (18)
- Biggest home win: Buca 6–1 Rize
- Biggest away win: Mersin 1–6 Karabük
- Highest scoring: Adana 3–4 Rize; Giresun 3–4 Altay; Bolu 5–2 Kartal; Hacettepe 2–5 GBB

The 2009–10 TFF 1. Lig (referred to as the Bank Asya 1. Lig for sponsorship reasons) is the 47th season of the second-level football league of Turkey since its establishment in 1963–64.

== Teams ==
2008–09 TFF 1. Lig champions Manisaspor, runners-up Diyarbakırspor and play-off winners Kasımpaşa were promoted to the 2009–10 Süper Lig. They were replaced by Konyaspor, Kocaelispor and Hacettepe, who ended the 2008–09 season in the bottom three places of the standings.

Sakaryaspor, Güngören Belediyespor and Malatyaspor were relegated to the Second League after finishing in the last three spots of the 2008–09 First League season standings. They were replaced by Second League teams Bucaspor, Mersin İdmanyurdu and Çanakkale Dardanelspor.

=== Team summaries ===
Location of teams in TFF 1. Lig 2009–10

Team	Venue	Capacity	Kitmaker	President	Coach
Adanaspor	Adana 5 Ocak Stadium	22,000	Nike	Bayram Akgül	(Turkey) Kemal Kılıç
Altay	İzmir Alsancak Stadium	15,055	Lescon	Niyazi Konuşmaz	(Turkey) Güvenç Kurtar
Boluspor	Bolu Atatürk Stadium	8,000	Adidas	Recep Aydoğanlı	(Turkey) Cüneyt Karakuş
Bucaspor	Buca Arena	12,000	Lescon	Mehmet Bektur	(Turkey) Özcan Kızıltan
Çanakkale Dardanelspor	Çanakkale 18 Mart Stadium	12,692	Diadora	Niyazi Önen	(Turkey) Mustafa Meteertem
Çaykur Rizespor	Yeni Rize Şehir Stadı	10,459	Lotto	Halim Mete	(Turkey) Ümit Kayıhan
Gaziantep BŞB	GASKİ Stadium	5,000	Lotto	Ünsal Göksen	(Turkey) C. Gürsel Menteşe
Giresunspor	Giresun Atatürk Stadium	12,192	Lescon	Olgun Aydın Peker	(Turkey) Levent Eriş
Hacettepe	Ankara 19 Mayıs Stadium	19,209	Lotto	Turgay Kalemci	(Turkey) Erol Tok
Kardemir Karabükspor	Necmettin Şeyhoğlu Stadium	9,086	Kappa	Hikmet Feridun Tankut	(Turkey) Yücel İldiz
Karşıyaka	İzmir Atatürk Stadium	58,008	Lotto	Akif Ersezgin	(Turkey) Erdoğan Arıca
Kartalspor	Kartal Stadium	15,000	Diadora	Cumhur Tavsatmaz	(Turkey) Kadir Özcan
Kayseri Erciyesspor	Kayseri Kadir Has Stadium	32,864	Errea	Nuh Mehmet Delikan	(Turkey) Levent Devrim
Kocaelispor	İzmit İsmet Paşa Stadium	16,800	Nike	Muammer Çelik	vacant
Konyaspor	Konya Atatürk Stadium	22,459	Lotto	Bahattin Karapınar	(Turkey) Ziya Doğan
Mersin İdmanyurdu	Tevfik Sırrı Gür Stadium	10,128	Adidas	Ali Kahramanlı	(Turkey) Ergün Penbe
Orduspor	Ordu 19 Eylül Stadium	15,000	Adidas	Nedim Türkmen	(Turkey) Ahmet Akcan
Samsunspor	Samsun 19 Mayıs Stadium	19,000	Errea	Hakkı Tomaç	(Turkey) Hüseyin Kalpar

=== Managerial changes ===
Team	Outgoing manager	Manner of departure	Date of vacancy	Replaced by	Date of appointment
Giresunspor	(Turkey) Yüksel Yeşilova	Sacked	7 Sep 2009	(Turkey) Levent Eriş	16 Sep 2009
Adanaspor	(Turkey) Ekrem Al	Resigned	28 Sep 2009	(Turkey) Kemal Kılıç	5 Oct 2009
Bucaspor	(Turkey) Kemal Kılıç	Resigned	30 Sep 2009	(Turkey) Özcan Kızıltan	5 Oct 2009
Orduspor	(Turkey) Osman Özdemir	Sacked	12 Oct 2009	(Turkey) Ekrem Al	14 Oct 2009
Samsunspor	(Turkey) Turhan Özyazanlar	Resigned	20 Oct 2009	(Turkey) Hüseyin Kalpar	30 Oct 2009
Boluspor	(Turkey) Coşkun Demirbakan	Mutual termination	2 Nov 2009	(Turkey) Mustafa Uğur	8 Nov 2009
Gaziantep B.B.	(Turkey) Bünyamin Süral	Resigned	2 Nov 2009	(Turkey) Cemal Gürsel Menteşe	4 Nov 2009
Karşıyaka	(Turkey) Reha Kapsal	Sacked	6 Nov 2009	(Turkey) Ümit Turmuş	18 Nov 2009
Ç. Rizespor	(Turkey) Oktay Çevik	Mutual termination	29 Nov 2009	(Turkey) Mehmet Şansal	3 Dec 2009
K. Erciyespor	(Turkey) Mustafa Altındağ	Sacked	4 Dec 2009	(Turkey) Levent Devrim	4 Dec 2009
Orduspor	(Turkey) Ekrem Al	Resigned	21 Dec 2009	(Turkey) Ahmet Akcan	24 Dec 2009
Hacettepe	(Turkey) Zeki Önder Özen	Sacked	24 Dec 2009	(Turkey) Erol Tok	31 Dec 2009
Mersin İY	(Turkey) Serhat Güller	Resigned	31 Jan 2010	(Turkey) Ergün Penbe	5 Feb 2010
Kocaelispor	(Turkey) Cihat Arslan	Resigned	1 Feb 2010	(Turkey) Bülent Baturman	3 Feb 2010
Ç. Rizespor	(Turkey) Mehmet Şansal	Resigned	2 Feb 2010	(Turkey) Ümit Kayıhan	2 Feb 2010
Altay	(Turkey) Fuat Yaman	Resigned	8 Feb 2010	(Turkey) Zafer Bilgetay	9 Feb 2010
Konyaspor	(Turkey) Hüsnü Özkara	Sacked	8 Feb 2010	(Turkey) Fuat Yaman	16 Feb 2010
Kocaelispor	(Turkey) Bülent Baturman	Sacked	16 Feb 2010	(Turkey) Coşkun Demirbakan	16 Feb 2010
Karşıyaka	(Turkey) Ümit Turmuş	Sacked	18 Feb 2010	(Turkey) Nihat Umut	18 Feb 2010
Konyaspor	(Turkey) Fuat Yaman	Resigned	22 Mar 2010	(Turkey) Ziya Doğan	26 Mar 2010
Karşıyaka	(Turkey) Nihat Umut	Left	24 Mar 2010	(Turkey) Erdoğan Arıca	25 Mar 2010
Boluspor	(Turkey) Mustafa Uğur	Resigned	5 Apr 2010	(Turkey) Cüneyt Karakuş	6 Apr 2010
Kocaelispor	(Turkey) Coşkun Demirbakan	Mutual termination	21 Apr 2010	vacant	
Altay	(Turkey) Zafer Bilgetay	Sacked	8 May 2010	(Turkey) Güvenç Kurtar	9 May 2010

=== Foreign players ===
Club	Player 1	Player 2	Former Players
Adanaspor	(Cameroon) Marc Mbamba	(Cameroon) Mbilla Etame	
Altay	(Argentina) Emanuel Molina	(Brazil) Tiago Bezerra	
Boluspor	(Albania) Gilman Lika	(Nigeria) Nduka Ozokwo	
Bucaspor	(Democratic Republic of the Congo) Pieter Mbemba		
Çanakkale Dardanelspor	(Ghana) Tetteh Komey	(Senegal) Babacar Diallo	(France) Charles Mendy
Çaykur Rizespor	(Brazil) Elionar Bombinha	(Senegal) Abdoulaye Diakate	
Gaziantep BŞB			(Cameroon) Paul Bebey
Giresunspor	(Bolivia) Ricardo Pedriel	(Brazil) Fabiano Oliveira	(Kyrgyzstan) Anton Zemlyanukhin
Hacettepe	(Croatia) Ante Kulušić	(Trinidad and Tobago) Jamal Clarence	(Ghana) Daniel Addo
Kardemir Karabükspor	(Nigeria) Emmanuel Emenike	(Uganda) Hassan Wasswa	
Karşıyaka	(Liberia) Tonia Tisdell		(Cameroon) Afred Tabot M'fongang
Kartalspor	(Ghana) Shaibu Yakubu	(Kazakhstan) Ali Aliyev	
Kayseri Erciyesspor	(Cameroon) Severin Bikoko		(Cameroon) Emmanuel Njock
Kocaelispor	(Republic of the Congo) David Louhoungou	(Sierra Leone) Sheriff Suma	
Konyaspor	(Brazil) Kauê	(Norway) Branimir Poljac	
Mersin İdmanyurdu	(Brazil) Alex Wilton	(Cameroon) Joseph Boum	
Orduspor	(Azerbaijan) Anatoli Ponomarev	(Ghana) Jerry Akaminko	(Albania) Xhevahir Sukaj
Samsunspor	(Czech Republic) Petr Pavlík		(Georgia (country)) Giorgi Chelidze

== League table ==
Pos	Team	Pld	W	D	L	GF	GA	GD	Pts	Qualification or relegation
1	Kardemir Karabükspor (C, P)	34	23	8	3	74	28	+46	77	Promotion to Süper Lig
2	Bucaspor (P)	34	19	7	8	69	40	+29	64 (Note: BUC 4–1 ADA; ADA 0–3 BUC)	Promotion to Süper Lig
3	Adanaspor	34	18	10	6	42	30	+12	64	Qualification for Promotion Playoffs
4	Altay	34	17	8	9	48	36	+12	59	Qualification for Promotion Playoffs
5	Karşıyaka	34	17	5	12	48	35	+13	56	Qualification for Promotion Playoffs
6	Konyaspor (O, P)	34	15	10	9	42	37	+5	55	Qualification for Promotion Playoffs
7	Giresunspor	34	15	6	13	51	42	+9	51	
8	Orduspor	34	11	11	12	33	32	+1	44	
9	Boluspor	34	12	7	15	48	53	−5	43	
10	Samsunspor	34	12	6	16	49	47	+2	42	
11	Erciyesspor	34	10	11	13	42	53	−11	41 (Note: KEC: 11 pts, 7–4; GBB: 10 pts, 6–4; MİY: 6 pts, 2–3; KRT: 5 pts, 2–6)	
12	Gaziantep B.B.	34	11	8	15	31	38	−7	41	
13	Mersin İdmanyurdu	34	11	8	15	36	44	−8	41	
14	Kartalspor	34	11	8	15	32	43	−11	41	
15	Çaykur Rizespor	34	10	10	14	37	53	−16	40	
16	Hacettepe Spor (R)	34	10	8	16	38	50	−12	38	Relegation to TFF Second League
17	Dardanelspor (R)	34	10	5	19	37	53	−16	35	Relegation to TFF Second League
18	Kocaelispor (R)	34	2	8	24	23	66	−43	14	Relegation to TFF Second League

Source: TFF
Rules for classification: 1) points; 2) goal difference; 3) number of goals scored.
(C) Champions; (O) Play-off winners; (P) Promoted; (R) Relegated

== Results ==
Home \ Away	ADA	ALT	BOL	BUC	DAR	ÇAY	GBB	GRS	HAC	KRB	KRŞ	KRT	KEC	KOC	KON	MİY	ORD	SAM
Adanaspor		2–2	2–1	0–3	2–1	3–4	1–0	0–1	1–0	3–1	1–0	1–0	1–1	1–0	0–0	3–2	2–0	2–0
Altay	0–1		3–0	1–1	3–2	1–0	1–0	1–4	2–0	1–1	0–2	0–0	1–0	1–0	4–1	0–1	1–1	1–0
Boluspor	3–1	2–0		4–1	2–1	2–1	0–0	2–1	1–2	1–1	0–4	5–2	1–2	2–2	0–1	2–1	2–4	0–2
Bucaspor	4–1	2–1	2–2		2–1	6–1	0–0	1–0	2–1	1–2	3–2	1–1	4–0	4–0	3–1	1–3	3–2	3–0
Çanakkale Dardanelspor	0–0	0–3	0–0	0–3		0–1	1–1	3–2	1–0	0–2	1–5	1–0	0–1	2–1	1–2	0–1	1–0	2–2
Çaykur Rizespor	0–0	1–1	2–1	0–0	3–3		1–2	2–1	1–1	0–3	0–2	2–1	2–0	1–1	2–1	4–0	0–2	2–2
Gaziantep B.B.	0–2	0–0	0–4	1–2	1–2	3–0		0–2	0–1	0–4	2–0	1–0	3–0	1–1	0–1	2–0	0–0	0–1
Giresunspor	0–1	3–4	1–1	0–2	3–1	1–2	0–1		1–0	0–0	0–1	5–2	2–1	3–0	3–2	2–1	1–1	3–2
Hacettepe Spor	0–0	1–3	0–1	2–2	2–1	0–0	2–5	1–1		2–4	4–1	3–1	4–2	1–0	0–1	1–1	0–3	1–0
Kardemir Karabükspor	1–0	3–0	2–1	3–0	1–0	3–0	2–2	1–0	4–2		3–0	3–0	4–2	1–0	4–1	0–0	1–1	2–1
Karşıyaka	1–1	1–4	2–1	2–0	2–1	3–0	1–2	0–1	0–1	0–0		0–1	2–1	2–0	2–2	3–0	0–0	2–0
Kartalspor	2–4	1–0	2–1	3–0	1–0	2–0	1–0	1–1	2–1	0–1	2–0		0–2	2–1	0–0	0–0	1–0	2–3
Kayseri Erciyesspor	0–0	1–2	2–0	0–3	2–4	3–1	3–0	1–1	3–1	1–2	2–2	1–1		2–2	0–0	1–0	3–2	1–5
Kocaelispor	0–0	2–3	1–2	2–4	0–2	1–3	3–1	1–2	1–1	1–5	1–2	0–0	1–1		0–2	1–0	0–2	0–4
Konyaspor	0–0	2–0	3–1	3–2	2–1	1–1	0–1	2–1	0–2	1–0	0–1	2–1	1–1	3–0		2–0	1–1	2–1
Mersin İdmanyurdu	1–2	1–1	2–2	1–0	1–2	0–0	0–0	4–1	1–0	1–6	0–2	2–0	0–0	3–0	3–1		0–1	1–2
Orduspor	1–2	0–2	0–1	0–0	1–0	1–0	2–1	0–1	0–0	3–1	1–0	0–0	0–1	1–0	1–1	0–2		1–3
Samsunspor	1–2	0–1	3–0	0–3	1–2	2–0	0–1	0–3	4–1	3–3	0–1	2–0	1–1	2–0	0–0	1–3	1–1	

Source: TFF
Legend: Blue = home team win; Yellow = draw; Red = away team win.

== Promotion playoffs ==
The teams ranked third through sixth have competed in the promotion playoffs for the 2010–11 Süper Lig. The games have been played at Atatürk Olympic Stadium and Ali Sami Yen Stadium in 17, 20 and 23 of May, 2010.

Pos	Team	Pld	W	D	L	GF	GA	GD	Pts	Promotion
1	Konyaspor (P)	3	2	1	0	6	3	+3	7	Promotion to Süper Lig
2	Altay	3	1	2	0	4	3	+1	5	
3	Karşıyaka	3	0	2	1	2	3	−1	2	
4	Adanaspor	3	0	1	2	4	7	−3	1	

Source: TFF group page
Rules for classification: 1) points; 2) goal difference; 3) number of goals scored.
(P) Promoted

Game results:

17 May 2010
20:00

Karşıyaka	0–0	Altay
	Report

Atatürk Olympic Stadium, Istanbul
Referee: Kuddusi Müftüoğlu

17 May 2010
20:00

Konyaspor	3–1	Adanaspor
Görkem Görk 50'; Ufukhan Bayraktar 67'; Eser Yağmur 89'	Report	Talha Mayhos 81'

Ali Sami Yen Stadium, Istanbul
Referee: Bülent Yıldırım

20 May 2010
20:00

Altay	2–1	Adanaspor
Burak Çalık 62'; Tiago Bezerra 90'; Tiago Bezerra (yellow card) 38' (red card) 90'	Report	Emrah Bedir 83'

Atatürk Olympic Stadium, Istanbul
Referee: Halis Özkahya

20 May 2010
20:00

Konyaspor	1–0	Karşıyaka
Erdal Kılıçaslan 12'	Report

Ali Sami Yen Stadium, Istanbul
Referee: Fırat Aydınus

22 May 2010
16:00

Adanaspor	2–2	Karşıyaka
Sinan Süngüoğlu 62' (F); Talha Mayhoş 81' (F)	Report	Şaban Genişyürek 26' (H); Köksal Yedek 34' (F)

Ali Sami Yen Stadium, Istanbul
Referee: Mete Kalkavan

23 May 2010
19:00

Altay	2–2	Konyaspor
Jorge Emanuel Molina 19' (H); Yiğitcan Erdoğan 87' (F); Soner Şahin (red card) 88'	Report	Ramazan Kahya 63' (F); Ramazan Kahya 69' (F)

Atatürk Olympic Stadium, Istanbul
Referee: Cüneyt Çakır

== Top goalscorers ==
Including matches played on 9 May 2010; Source: TFF

Rank	Player	Club	Goals
1	(Turkey) Yasin Avcı	Kardemir Karabükspor	18
2	(Nigeria) Emmanuel Emenike	Kardemir Karabükspor	16
2	(Turkey) Mehmet Batdal	Bucaspor	16
4	(Ghana) Shaibu Yakubu	Kartalspor	14
4	(Turkey) Turgut Doğan Şahin	Samsunspor	14
6	(Turkey) Okan Öztürk	Karşıyaka	13
7	(Brazil) Fabiano Monteiro	Giresunspor	12
8	(Turkey) Adem Büyük	Boluspor	11
8	(Bolivia) Ricardo Pedriel Suárez	Giresunspor	11
8	(Turkey) Yunus Altun	Bucaspor	11

== See also ==
- 2009–10 Türkiye Kupası
- 2009–10 Süper Lig
- 2009–10 TFF Second League
