= 2010–11 TFF 2. Lig =

TFF Second League
- Season: 2010–11
- Champions: Göztepe, Elazığ
- Promoted: Sakarya
- Relegated: A.Sebat, Hacettepe, Gebze, Tarsus İY, B.Van, Dardanel
- Matches: 612
- Goals: 1,469 (2.4 per match)
- Top goalscorer: Coşkun Yılmaz (BŞK): 19
- Biggest home win: İDÇ–GBZ: 8-1 (15)
- Biggest away win: PUR–KŞK: 0-5 (3); TUR–GÖZ: 0-5 (23)
- Highest scoring: GBZ–ÇNK: 4-5 (27)

The 2010–11 TFF Second League (also known as Spor-Toto Second League due to sponsorship reasons) is the 10th season of the league since its establishment in 2001 as the third level division; and the 48th season of the second league in Turkish football since its establishment in 1963–64 (before 2001 league was played as second level division).

League was played with 36 teams, 18 in White group and 18 in Red group. Winner of each group promoted to 2011–12 TFF First League. A play off series were played among best four teams in each group to determine the third team to promote. Bottom three teams in each groups relegated to 2011–12 TFF Third League.

League was started on 29 August 2010 and ended on 8 May 2011. Promotion play-offs were played on 16–22 May 2011.

== Teams ==
Locations of teams in the 2010–11 TFF Second League.
Key: Black – White Group, Red – Red Group, White - Promoted, Green - Playoff Quarter-finals, Blue - Playoff Semi-finals, Orange - Playoff Final

== Team summaries ==
Team	Group	Location	Stadium	Capacity	President	Coach
Adana Demirspor	Red	Adana	Adana 5 Ocak Stadium	14,085	Mustafa Tuncel	Ali Güneş
Adıyamanspor	White	Adıyaman	Adıyaman Atatürk Stadium	8,596	Nöyfel Bozdoğan	Mehmet Ali Çınar
Akçaabat Sebatspor	White	Trabzon	Akçaabat Fatih Stadium	6,238	Zeki Öztürk	Ekrem Al
Alanyaspor	White	Antalya	Alanya Milli Egemenlik Stadium	3,750	Hakan Dizdaroğlu	Altan Çetindağ
Balıkesirspor	Red	Balıkesir	Balıkesir Atatürk Stadium	5,000	Tuna Aktürk	Mesut Dilsöz
Bandırmaspor	White	Balıkesir	Bandırma 17 Eylül Stadium	5,400	Mehmet Kılkışlı	Serhat Güller
Belediye Vanspor	Red	Van	Van Atatürk Stadium	10,500	Nihat Gezici	İbrahim Tolgay Kerimoğlu
Beypazarı Şekerspor	White	Ankara	Ankara Ostim Stadium	4,271	Hızır Demir	Mete Işık
1461 Trabzon	Red	Trabzon	Ahmet Suat Özyazıcı Stadium	7,700	Metin Özke	Zafer Hızarcı
Bozüyükspor	White	Bozüyük	Bozüyük İlçe Stadium	4,100	Doğmuş Hilmi Üneral	Mustafa Serin
Bugsaşspor	White	Ankara	Ankara Ostim Stadium	4,271	A. Raşit Civan	Zeki Önder Özen
Çanakkale Dardanelspor	Red	Çanakkale	18 Mart Stadium	10,500	Osman Niyazi Önen	Yavuz İncedal
Çankırı Belediyespor	White	Çankırı	Çankırı Atatürk Stadium	4,410	Sevda Şireci	Sezai Yıldırım
Çorumspor	White	Çorum	Dr. Turhan Kılıççıoğlu Stadium	11,263	İbrahim Necmi Özkaya	Gürses Kılıç
Elazığspor	Red	Elazığ	Elazığ Atatürk Stadium	13,923	Akın Şatıroğlu	Osman Özköylü
Eyüpspor	Red	Istanbul	Eyüp Stadium	2,500	Şevket Sever	Cihat Arslan
Fethiyespor	Red	Muğla	Fethiye Şehir Stadium	8,372	İsmail Öztürk	Erkan Sözeri
Gebzespor	White	Kocaeli	Gebze Ilçe Stadium	8,000	Fatih Engin Eyüboğlu	Erhan Arslan
Göztepe	White	İzmir	İzmir Alsancak Stadium	15,358	İnan Altınbaş	Özcan Kızıltan
Hacettepe	White	Ankara	Cebeci İnönü Stadium	19,209	Subhi Acar Yalçınkaya	Osman Nuri Işılar
İskenderun DÇ	White	İskenderun	İskenderun 5 Temmuz Stadium	12,390	Ali Cengiz Gül	Besim Durmuş
Kocaelispor	Red	İzmit	İzmit İsmet Paşa Stadium	12,710	Rafet Kırğız	Soner Alp
K. Torku Şekerspor	Red	Konya	Recep Konuk Spor Tesisleri	2,128	Yavuz Erence	Ömer Kadri Özcan
Körfezspor	White	Kocaeli	Izmit Alparslan Türkeş Stadium	1,790	İsmail Cenk Karaloğlu	Ahmet Yıldırım
Mardinspor	White	Mardin	21 Kasım Stadium	5,700	Murat Gelmedi	Yaşar Şen
Ofspor	Red	Trabzon	Of Ilçe Stadium	2,303	Ercan Saral	İlker Erdem
Pendikspor	Red	Istanbul	Pendik Stadium	2,500	Murat Şahsuvaroğlu	Abdülkerim Durmaz
Pursaklarspor	Red	Ankara	Bağlum Belediye Stadium	20,000	Zeynep Bekçe	Tahir Çopur
Sakaryaspor	Red	Adapazarı	Sakarya Atatürk Stadium	13,216	Rauf Batuboylu	Şaban Yıldırım
Sarıyer	White	Istanbul	Yusuf Ziya Öniş Stadium	8,000	Mehmet Akdağ	İlker Yağcıoğlu
Şanlıurfaspor	Red	Şanlıurfa	Şanlıurfa GAP Stadium	28,965	Habib Arslan	Ümit Erol Tok
Tarsus İdmanyurdu	Red	Tarsus	Tarsus Buhanettin Kocamaz Stadium	4,201	İsmail Akdağcık	Mustafa Çapanoğlu
Tokatspor	Red	Tokat	Gaziosmanpaşa Stadium	5,762	Ahmet Sami Ülkü	Suat Kaya
Turgutluspor	White	Manisa	Turgutlu 7 Eylül Stadium	4,100	Murat Ayhan	Burhanettin Basatemur
Türk Telekomspor	Red	Ankara	Türk Telekom Stadium	1,603	Celalettin Dinçer	İsmet Taşdemir
Yeni Malatyaspor	White	Malatya	Malatya İnönü Stadium	10,411	Memet Emin Katipoğlu	Cafer Aydın

Note: By the end of the season

== White Group ==
=== White Group league table ===
Pos	Team	Pld	W	D	L	GF	GA	GD	Pts	Qualification or relegation
1	Göztepe A.Ş. (C, P)	34	22	8	4	70	27	+43	74	Promotion to TFF First League
2	Bandırmaspor	34	20	7	7	59	28	+31	67	Qualification for Promotion Playoffs
3	Bugsaşspor	34	19	9	6	52	27	+25	66	Qualification for Promotion Playoffs
4	Beypazarı Şekerspor	34	15	15	4	45	28	+17	60	Qualification for Promotion Playoffs
5	Yeni Malatyaspor	34	17	7	10	36	33	+3	58	Qualification for Promotion Playoffs
6	Çorumspor	34	16	7	11	43	35	+8	55	
7	Körfez İskenderun Spor	34	16	6	12	57	34	+23	54	
8	Turgutluspor	34	15	8	11	45	42	+3	53	
9	Bozüyükspor	34	14	9	11	44	42	+2	51	
10	Kocaeli Birlik Spor	34	11	9	14	36	38	−2	42	
11	Çankırı Belediyespor	34	10	8	16	43	53	−10	38	
12	Sarıyer	34	9	11	14	32	41	−9	38	
13	Mardinspor	34	8	12	14	23	34	−11	36	
14	Alanyaspor	34	9	8	17	35	54	−19	35	
15	Adıyamanspor	34	8	10	16	31	42	−11	34	
16	Akçaabat Sebatspor (R)	34	8	10	16	32	53	−21	34	Relegation to TFF Third League
17	Hacettepe Spor (R)	34	8	8	18	41	59	−18	32	Relegation to TFF Third League
18	Gebzespor (R)	34	1	8	25	26	80	−54	11	Relegation to TFF Third League

Source: TFF Second League page
Rules for classification: 1) points; 2) goal difference; 3) number of goals scored.
(C) Champions; (P) Promoted; (R) Relegated

=== White Group positions by round ===
Team ╲ Round	1	2	3	4	5	6	7	8	9	10	11	12	13	14	15	16	17	18	19	20	21	22	23	24	25	26	27	28	29	30	31	32	33	34
Göztepe A.Ş.	13	5	6	10	7	4	6	3	3	2	2	2	2	2	3	2	1	1	1	1	1	2	2	1	1	1	1	1	1	1	1	1	1	1
Bandırmaspor	1	1	1	1	1	1	1	1	1	1	1	1	1	1	1	1	2	2	2	2	2	1	1	2	2	2	2	2	2	2	2	2	2	2
Bugsaşspor	4	3	5	9	5	7	8	5	8	5	8	7	5	4	6	5	4	4	4	3	3	3	5	3	3	3	3	3	3	3	3	3	3	3
Beypazarı Şekerspor	3	2	3	3	4	6	3	2	2	3	4	6	4	5	5	4	5	5	6	6	5	5	4	5	5	5	4	4	4	4	4	4	5	4
Yeni Malatyaspor	18	11	16	17	17	16	14	15	12	15	15	11	10	10	10	10	11	10	8	9	9	10	9	9	10	9	5	5	5	5	5	5	4	5
Çorumspor	4	11	11	7	3	8	5	6	5	7	6	4	7	9	9	7	8	9	9	8	8	8	8	8	8	8	9	9	9	9	9	9	7	6
Körfez İskenderun Spor	2	4	2	2	2	2	2	4	4	4	3	3	3	3	2	3	3	3	5	5	4	4	3	4	4	4	6	6	6	6	6	6	6	7
Turgutluspor	12	13	7	4	9	11	9	7	7	6	5	8	6	6	4	6	6	6	3	4	6	7	7	7	7	7	8	8	8	8	8	8	9	8
Bozüyükspor	4	8	14	8	6	3	4	8	6	8	7	5	8	8	8	9	7	7	7	7	7	6	6	6	6	6	7	7	7	7	7	7	8	9
Kocaeli Birlik Spor	13	7	13	12	11	12	13	11	11	10	10	9	9	7	7	8	9	8	10	10	10	9	10	10	9	10	10	10	10	10	10	10	10	10
Çankırı Belediyespor	8	14	8	11	13	13	10	12	13	11	11	12	13	15	15	15	15	16	16	16	15	15	14	14	14	13	12	12	12	12	12	12	12	11
Sarıyer	4	8	15	15	16	15	17	14	16	16	16	17	15	12	11	11	10	11	11	11	11	11	11	11	11	11	11	11	11	11	11	11	11	12
Mardinspor	10	16	10	14	10	10	12	13	15	14	14	15	12	14	14	14	14	15	15	14	14	14	15	16	16	16	14	14	14	14	14	14	15	13
Alanyaspor	17	6	4	5	12	9	11	10	10	13	13	14	16	13	13	12	12	12	12	12	12	12	12	12	12	12	13	13	13	13	13	13	13	14
Adıyamanspor	13	8	12	12	14	14	15	16	14	12	12	13	14	16	16	16	17	17	17	17	16	16	16	15	15	15	17	17	17	17	17	17	16	15
Akçaabat Sebatspor	8	17	17	18	15	18	18	18	18	18	17	16	17	17	17	17	16	13	14	15	17	17	17	17	17	17	16	16	16	16	16	16	14	16
Hacettepe Spor	10	14	9	6	8	5	7	9	9	9	9	10	11	11	12	13	13	14	13	13	13	13	13	13	13	14	15	15	15	15	15	15	17	17
Gebzespor	13	18	18	16	18	17	16	17	17	17	18	18	18	18	18	18	18	18	18	18	18	18	18	18	18	18	18	18	18	18	18	18	18	18

Source: TFF Second League page

=== White Group results ===
Home \ Away	ADY	AÇS	ALA	BAN	BŞS	BZÜ	BUG	ÇNK	ÇOR	GBZ	GÖZ	HAC	İDÇ	KRF	MRD	SAR	TRG	YML
Adıyamanspor		2–1	0–1	3–2	2–1	0–0	0–1	0–0	0–0	2–1	2–2	2–3	3–0	3–2	0–0	0–0	1–2	1–2
Akçaabat Sebatspor	1–0		3–2	0–2	0–1	0–0	1–3	2–1	1–5	0–1	1–3	0–0	0–1	2–0	2–1	3–1	0–2	1–1
Alanyaspor	1–1	0–1		1–3	3–3	2–0	1–3	3–1	2–0	2–0	1–1	1–1	0–3	0–0	0–1	0–3	3–1	1–1
Bandırmaspor	2–0	2–0	3–1		1–1	3–0	2–1	1–0	3–0	6–1	0–2	0–0	2–0	1–0	0–0	4–2	2–0	3–0
Beypazarı Şekerspor	1–0	1–1	3–0	2–0		2–2	1–0	0–0	2–1	2–2	2–2	1–0	2–1	2–1	0–0	1–0	2–1	2–0
Bozüyükspor	1–1	3–0	3–1	0–2	0–1		1–3	2–2	2–0	4–2	1–1	4–1	2–2	0–2	1–0	2–1	1–0	2–0
Bugsaşspor	1–1	3–2	3–1	2–0	0–0	3–2		1–0	0–2	2–0	1–0	4–2	1–0	2–0	4–1	1–1	1–1	1–0
Çankırı Belediyespor	2–1	1–1	2–0	1–1	2–0	1–0	0–0		1–1	3–1	1–3	3–2	0–2	0–1	3–2	2–0	0–1	1–2
Çorumspor	1–0	2–2	1–1	2–2	1–1	3–0	0–0	2–1		2–1	1–0	1–0	0–2	2–1	1–0	1–0	1–0	1–2
Gebzespor	1–2	1–1	1–2	0–3	1–2	0–1	0–3	4–5	0–3		1–1	1–1	0–1	0–0	0–3	1–1	2–3	1–1
Göztepe A.Ş.	3–1	2–0	3–1	3–1	3–2	3–1	1–1	2–0	2–1	4–0		4–1	1–1	2–1	3–0	4–0	2–0	0–0
Hacettepe Spor	1–0	2–3	0–1	1–3	0–3	1–2	0–2	2–1	2–0	2–0	1–3		2–1	1–2	0–0	2–2	3–3	3–1
Körfez İskenderun Spor	2–0	5–0	3–0	1–1	0–0	1–0	1–1	3–2	1–3	8–1	2–0	4–0		1–2	1–0	2–0	1–2	2–0
Kocaeli Birlik Spor	0–0	1–1	1–2	0–1	0–0	0–1	1–0	5–0	3–2	3–1	2–1	0–4	3–2		0–0	0–1	1–0	1–2
Mardinspor	3–1	0–0	2–0	0–0	1–1	1–1	0–0	1–3	0–3	2–1	0–2	0–0	1–0	2–1		1–2	1–0	0–2
Sarıyer	0–1	1–0	1–1	1–3	2–1	2–2	2–1	1–1	2–0	0–0	0–1	3–1	2–1	0–0	0–0		0–0	1–2
Turgutluspor	2–1	1–1	1–0	2–0	1–1	1–2	2–0	5–3	0–1	3–0	0–5	2–1	1–1	2–2	1–0	1–0		2–2
Yeni Malatyaspor	2–0	2–1	1–0	1–0	1–1	0–1	1–2	1–0	1–0	2–0	0–1	2–1	2–1	0–0	1–0	1–0	0–2	

Source: TFF Second League page
Legend: Blue = home team win; Yellow = draw; Red = away team win.

=== White Group top goalscorers ===
Including matches played on 8 May 2011;
Source: TFF Second League page

Rank	Scorer	Club	Goals
1	(Turkey) Coşkun Yılmaz	Beypazarı Şekerspor	19
2	(Turkey) Fatih Arat	Alanyaspor	17
3	(Turkey) Tayfun Özkan	Göztepe	16
4	(Turkey) M. Ozan Cengiz	Bandırmaspor	14
4	(Turkey) Özcan Dağ	İskenderun DÇ	14
6	(Turkey) Gürkan İzmirlioğlu	Çankırı Belediyespor	13
6	(Turkey) İlhan Şahin	Göztepe	13
8	(Turkey) Mustafa Şen	Bandırmaspor	12
8	(Turkey) Türker Demirhan	Göztepe	12
10	(Turkey) Galip Güzel	Bandırmaspor	11
10	(Turkey) Şamil Ünal	İskenderun DÇ	11

== Red Group ==
=== Red Group league table ===
Pos	Team	Pld	W	D	L	GF	GA	GD	Pts	Qualification or relegation
1	Elazığspor (C, P)	34	20	11	3	55	24	+31	71	Promotion to TFF First League
2	Konya Şekerspor	34	21	4	9	64	36	+28	67	Qualification for Promotion Playoffs
3	Eyüpspor	34	16	8	10	39	33	+6	56	Qualification for Promotion Playoffs
4	Sakaryaspor (P)	34	16	6	12	40	37	+3	54	Qualification for Promotion Playoffs
5	Adana Demirspor	34	13	11	10	36	34	+2	50	Qualification for Promotion Playoffs
6	Fethiyespor	34	12	10	12	43	38	+5	46	
7	Tokatspor	34	9	17	8	38	33	+5	44	
8	Şanlıurfaspor	34	10	13	11	33	33	0	43	
9	Pendikspor	34	11	10	13	40	48	−8	43	
10	Balıkesirspor	34	11	10	13	48	50	−2	43	
11	Pursaklarspor	34	9	13	12	28	38	−10	40	
12	Kocaelispor	34	10	15	9	39	41	−2	39 (Note: Kocaelispor had a 6 points penalty due to financial issues.)	
13	Ofspor A.Ş.	34	10	9	15	39	44	−5	39	
14	1461 Trabzon	34	9	12	13	41	51	−10	39	
15	Türk Telekomspor	34	8	14	12	34	40	−6	38	
16	Tarsus İ.Y. (R)	34	11	5	18	40	49	−9	38	Relegation to TFF Third League
17	Van BB (R)	34	8	11	15	32	46	−14	35	Relegation to TFF Third League
18	Çanakkale Dardanelspor (R)	34	7	11	16	30	44	−14	32	Relegation to TFF Third League

Source: TFF Second League page
Rules for classification: 1) points; 2) goal difference; 3) number of goals scored.
(C) Champions; (P) Promoted; (R) Relegated

=== Red Group positions by round ===
Team ╲ Round	1	2	3	4	5	6	7	8	9	10	11	12	13	14	15	16	17	18	19	20	21	22	23	24	25	26	27	28	29	30	31	32	33	34
Elazığspor	3	2	5	4	3	5	2	2	2	2	1	1	1	2	2	1	1	1	1	1	1	1	1	1	1	1	1	1	1	1	1	1	1	1
Konya Şekerspor	11	3	1	1	1	1	1	1	1	1	2	2	2	1	1	2	2	2	2	2	2	2	2	2	2	2	2	2	2	2	2	2	2	2
Eyüpspor	3	10	13	16	16	16	16	16	15	13	14	11	9	11	7	8	10	11	8	7	6	5	9	8	5	4	4	4	3	3	3	3	3	3
Sakaryaspor	5	5	2	2	2	2	4	6	3	3	3	4	4	4	5	5	5	4	4	3	3	3	3	3	3	3	3	3	5	5	5	5	4	4
Adana Demirspor	11	7	4	3	7	11	11	13	9	9	7	5	5	3	3	3	4	5	6	6	5	8	6	6	8	7	5	5	4	4	4	4	5	5
Fethiyespor	2	1	3	7	8	4	7	8	10	12	11	14	12	12	12	12	9	7	5	5	9	11	10	9	7	5	7	7	6	6	6	6	6	6
Tokatspor	5	11	15	8	5	3	5	3	4	5	5	6	10	9	9	10	12	9	10	8	7	6	4	5	6	8	8	8	8	8	8	8	9	7
Şanlıurfaspor	1	8	9	14	13	9	6	4	6	6	6	7	11	6	6	7	6	10	12	11	8	7	5	4	4	6	6	6	7	7	7	7	7	8
Pendikspor	15	9	11	13	15	12	8	11	12	14	10	10	8	8	4	4	3	3	3	4	4	4	7	7	9	9	10	10	10	10	10	10	10	9
Balıkesirspor	5	13	7	5	6	10	12	7	7	7	9	9	6	10	11	11	7	6	7	9	11	9	8	10	10	10	9	9	9	9	9	9	8	10
Pursaklarspor	18	18	18	18	17	17	17	17	18	18	18	18	18	18	18	17	16	16	17	14	13	13	13	14	14	12	12	12	13	13	13	13	13	11
Kocaelispor	17	17	17	17	18	18	18	18	17	17	15	13	14	13	13	14	11	8	9	10	12	10	11	11	11	11	11	11	11	11	11	11	11	12
Ofspor A.Ş.	5	4	6	11	12	8	10	10	11	11	13	15	15	16	16	18	17	17	15	16	16	17	17	17	17	16	13	13	16	16	16	16	14	13
1461 Trabzon	11	16	16	15	9	13	14	9	13	8	12	12	13	14	14	15	14	13	13	13	15	14	15	15	16	17	18	18	17	17	17	17	15	14
Türk Telekomspor	15	14	8	9	11	7	3	5	5	4	4	3	3	5	8	6	8	12	11	12	10	12	12	13	12	13	14	14	12	12	12	12	12	15
Tarsus İ.Y.	5	6	10	6	10	14	15	15	16	16	17	16	16	17	15	13	15	15	16	17	17	16	14	12	13	14	15	15	14	14	14	14	16	16
Van BB	5	12	14	10	4	6	9	12	8	10	8	8	7	7	10	9	13	14	14	15	14	15	16	16	15	15	17	17	15	15	15	15	17	17
Çanakkale Dardanelspor	11	14	12	12	14	15	13	14	14	15	16	17	17	15	17	16	18	18	18	18	18	18	18	18	18	18	16	16	18	18	18	18	18	18

Source: TFF Second League page

=== Red Group results ===
Home \ Away	ADS	BAL	VAN	TRA	DAR	ELZ	EYP	FTH	KOC	KŞK	OFS	PDK	PUR	SKR	ŞUR	TİY	TOK	TTS
Adana Demirspor		2–2	0–0	2–0	3–2	3–0	1–0	2–1	2–0	0–0	2–1	1–3	1–0	0–0	0–0	3–2	1–2	2–0
Balıkesirspor	0–1		2–0	3–2	2–0	1–1	1–3	3–2	2–2	1–4	2–1	1–3	1–0	3–0	0–0	0–2	2–2	3–1
Van BB	2–1	2–0		1–1	1–0	1–1	1–0	0–1	0–0	0–2	3–0	2–0	0–2	1–1	1–1	5–2	1–1	0–1
1461 Trabzon	1–1	2–2	3–2		3–3	1–5	2–1	0–1	1–1	3–0	1–3	0–0	0–0	1–0	0–0	3–0	2–0	4–2
Çanakkale Dardanelspor	3–0	2–1	1–0	0–0		1–3	0–1	0–0	1–0	2–0	1–1	0–0	1–2	1–2	0–2	1–0	2–1	1–1
Elazığspor	1–1	2–1	5–0	2–0	1–0		0–1	0–0	3–0	2–1	2–1	3–0	1–1	2–0	3–0	1–0	1–0	1–0
Eyüpspor	1–1	0–2	1–0	1–1	2–1	2–2		3–2	0–0	2–0	2–1	1–0	0–1	2–0	2–1	2–1	0–1	1–2
Fethiyespor	2–2	1–1	2–1	3–1	4–2	1–2	2–0		1–1	2–3	1–1	1–1	3–1	0–1	0–0	3–2	1–0	1–0
Kocaelispor	2–0	2–0	1–1	4–0	1–1	0–0	0–0	0–4		1–2	3–2	2–0	2–1	2–0	2–1	0–1	1–1	1–1
Konya Şekerspor	1–0	3–1	1–1	3–0	4–2	1–1	4–0	3–0	1–2		0–1	2–1	0–1	1–0	2–1	0–1	2–2	4–2
Ofspor A.Ş.	0–1	1–1	3–2	2–1	0–0	1–1	0–2	1–0	0–0	2–0		1–2	0–1	1–3	0–1	2–0	2–2	0–0
Pendikspor	1–0	2–3	3–4	1–0	2–0	0–2	1–1	0–0	1–3	2–4	0–2		1–0	2–1	1–1	2–0	1–1	0–3
Pursaklarspor	0–0	1–0	3–0	0–3	1–1	1–1	0–2	0–2	1–1	0–5	1–0	1–2		2–3	0–0	1–1	1–0	1–3
Sakaryaspor	1–0	1–4	2–0	2–1	0–0	0–1	1–1	1–0	5–1	0–2	2–3	1–0	1–1		2–0	1–0	1–0	1–1
Şanlıurfaspor	2–1	2–1	3–0	1–1	2–0	1–2	0–1	0–0	3–1	1–2	3–2	2–2	0–0	1–3		0–1	0–1	1–0
Tarsus İ.Y.	0–1	1–0	2–0	3–0	1–0	4–2	1–2	2–1	2–2	1–2	2–2	1–2	1–1	1–2	1–2		1–1	0–2
Tokatspor	3–0	1–1	0–0	2–2	2–0	0–0	2–0	2–1	1–1	1–2	2–0	2–2	1–1	0–1	1–1	2–0		0–0
Türk Telekomspor	1–1	1–1	0–0	0–1	1–1	0–1	1–1	2–0	2–0	0–3	0–2	2–2	1–1	2–1	0–0	1–3	1–1	

Source: TFF Second League page
Legend: Blue = home team win; Yellow = draw; Red = away team win.

=== Red Group top goalscorers ===
Including matches played on 8 May 2011;
Source: TFF Second League page.

Rank	Scorer	Club	Goals
1	(Turkey) Cafercan Aksu	Konya Torku Şekerspor	15
2	(Turkey) Sezai Demircan	Ofspor	13
3	(Turkey) Burhan Coşkun	Adana Demirspor	12
3	(Turkey) Göksu Türkdoğan	Adana Demirspor	12
5	(Turkey) Coşkun Birdal	Pendikspor	11
6	(Turkey) Arif Şahin	Elazığspor	10
6	(Turkey) Arslan Çaıroğlu	Ofspor	10
6	(Turkey) Sinan Uzun	Balıkesirspor	10
9	(Turkey) Erman Özcan	Konya Torku Şekerspor	9
9	(Turkey) Sinan Özkan	Tokatspor	7

== Promotion playoffs ==
In each group, teams ranked second through fifth will compete in the promotion playoffs for the 2011–12 TFF First League. The 2nd team and 5th team, and 3rd and 4th teams will play one match in a neutral venue. Winners will play finals. Winner of the final will be third team to promote to TFF First League 2011-2012.

Quarter-finals
15 May – Antalya
Yeni Malatyaspor	1 (1)
Adana Demirspor (pen.)	1 (3)
15 May – Antalya
Bandırmaspor	1
Beypazarı Şekerspor	0
16 May – Antalya
Sakaryaspor	3
Konya Şekerspor	1
16 May – Antalya
Eyüpspor	0
Bugsaşspor	5

Semi-finals
18 May – Antalya
Adana Demirspor	1
Bandırmaspor	3
19 May – Antalya
Sakaryaspor(pen.)	1 (5)
Bugsaşspor	1 (4)

Final
22 May – Antalya
Bandırmaspor	1
Sakaryaspor	5

Quarter-finals

15 May 2011
17:00

Yeni Malatyaspor	1-1 (a.e.t.)	Adana Demirspor
Penalties
	1–3

Atatürk Stadium, Antalya
Referee: -

15 May 2011
20:30

Bandırmaspor	1-0	Beypazarı Şekerspor

Atatürk Stadium, Antalya
Referee: -

16 May 2011
17:00

Sakaryaspor	3-1	Konya Şekerspor

Atatürk Stadium, Antalya
Referee: -

16 May 2011
20:30

Eyüpspor	0-5	Bugsaşspor

Atatürk Stadium, Antalya
Referee: -

Semi-final

18 May 2011
19:00

Adana Demirspor	1-3	Bandırmaspor

Atatürk Stadium, Antalya
Referee: -

19 May 2011
19:00

Sakaryaspor	1-1	Bugsaşspor
Penalties
	5–4

Atatürk Stadium, Antalya
Referee: -

Final

22 May 2011
19:00

Bandırmaspor	1-5	Sakaryaspor

Mardan Antalyaspor Stadium, Antalya
Referee: -

== See also ==
- 2010–11 Türkiye Kupası
- 2010–11 Süper Lig
- 2010–11 TFF First League
- 2010–11 TFF Third League
