= 1965–66 Galatasaray S.K. season =

Galatasaray
1965–66 season
- President: (Turkey) Suphi Batur
- Manager: (Turkey) Gündüz Kılıç
- Stadium: Mithatpaşa Stadi; Ali Sami Yen Stadi
- 1.Lig: 2nd
- Türkiye Kupası: Winner
- CWC: First round
- Top goalscorer: League: Metin Oktay (19); All: Metin Oktay (20)
- Highest home attendance: 39,140 vs Fenerbahçe SK (Türkiye Kupası, 12 June 1966)
- Lowest home attendance: 9,031 vs Feriköy SK (1. Lig, 11 September 1965)
- Average home league attendance: 16,076
Home colours	Away colours	Third colours

The 1965–66 season was Galatasaray's 62nd in existence and the 8th consecutive season in the 1. Lig. This article shows statistics of the club's players in the season, and also lists all matches that the club have played in the season.

== Squad statistics ==
No.	Pos.	Name	1. Lig		Türkiye Kupası		CWC		Total	
No.	Pos.	Name	Apps	Goals	Apps	Goals	Apps	Goals	Apps	Goals
1	GK	(Turkey) Turgay Şeren(C)	20	0	3	0	0	0	23	0
-	GK	(Turkey) Osman Uçaner	0	0	0	0	0	0	0	0
-	GK	(Turkey) Bülent Gürbüz	10	0	2	0	2	0	14	0
-	DF	(Turkey) Ertan Gürkan	5	0	0	0	0	0	5	0
-	GK	(Turkey) Ergün Acuner	18	5	4	0	0	0	22	5
-	DF	(Turkey) Doğan Sel	22	0	3	0	1	0	26	0
-	DF	(Turkey) Tuncer İnceler	0	0	0	0	0	0	0	0
-	DF	(Turkey) Bekir Türkgeldi	21	0	5	0	0	0	26	0
-	DF	(Turkey) Naci Erdem	16	0	0	0	2	0	18	0
-	MF	(Turkey) Bahri Altıntabak	13	5	2	0	2	0	17	5
-	MF	(Turkey) Talat Özkarslı	11	0	4	0	2	0	17	0
-	DF	(Turkey) İsmet Yurtsü	4	0	0	0	1	0	5	0
-	DF	(Turkey) Turan Doğangün	28	4	5	2	2	0	35	6
-	MF	(Turkey) Mustafa Yürür	27	0	5	0	1	0	33	0
-	FW	(Turkey) Ayhan Elmastaşoğlu	28	12	2	0	2	1	32	13
-	FW	(Turkey) Uğur Köken	14	1	5	1	2	1	21	3
-	FW	(Turkey) Yılmaz Gökdel	26	3	3	0	1	0	30	3
-	FW	(Turkey) Tarık Kutver	12	3	4	1	2	10	18	5
-	FW	(Turkey) Ahmet Tuna Kozan	22	0	1	0	1	0	24	0
-	FW	(Turkey) Mustafa Aksoy	4	0	0	0	0	0	4	0
-	FW	(Turkey) Kadri Aytaç	2	0	2	1	0	0	4	1
10	FW	(Turkey) Metin Oktay	26	19	5	1	1	0	33	20

=== Players in / out ===
==== In ====
Pos.	Nat.	Name	Age	Moving from
MF	(Turkey)	Ahmet Tuna Kozan	22	Karşıyaka SK
DF	(Turkey)	Ergün Acuner	23	İzmirspor
DF	(Turkey)	Tuncer İnceler	22	Feriköy SK
DF	(Turkey)	Bekir Türkgeldi	29	Altay SK

==== Out ====
Pos.	Nat.	Name	Age	Moving from
DF	(Turkey)	Candemir Berkman	31	Vefa SK
MF	(Turkey)	Ergun Ercins	30	Vefa SK
FW	(Turkey)	Ahmet Berman	33	Vefa SK

== 1.Lig ==
=== Standings ===
Pos	Team	Pld	W	D	L	GF	GA	GD	Pts	Qualification or relegation
1	Beşiktaş (C)	30	20	8	2	52	16	+36	48	Qualification to European Cup first round
2	Galatasaray	30	17	8	5	53	20	+33	42	Qualification to Cup Winners' Cup first round
3	Gençlerbirliği	30	15	8	7	32	24	+8	38	
4	Fenerbahçe	30	10	12	8	32	25	+7	32	
5	Göztepe A.Ş.	30	12	8	10	33	27	+6	32	Invitation to Inter-Cities Fairs Cup first round

Rules for classification: 1) points; 2) goal difference; 3) number of goals scored.
(C) Champions

=== Matches ===
5 September 1965 1	Galatasaray SK	1–2	Vefa SK	Istanbul
14:30 EET	Metin Oktay 55'	(Report)	Erdoğan Ertaul 34'; Zeki Temizer 65'	Stadium: Mithatpaşa Stadi; Attendance: 32,437; Referee: Necdet Oralalp

11 September 1965 2	Galatasaray SK	3–1	Feriköy SK	Istanbul
16:00 EET	Metin Oktay 14', 54'; Turan Doğangün 24'	(Report)	Arif Omaç 78'	Stadium: Mithatpaşa Stadi; Attendance: 9,031; Referee: Zülbahar Sağnak

19 September 1965 3	Galatasaray SK	0–0	Beykoz 1908 SKD	Istanbul
14:15 EET		(Report)		Stadium: Mithatpaşa Stadi; Attendance: n/a Referee: Hüseyin Maloğlu

3 October 1965 4	Galatasaray SK	1–0	İstanbulspor	Istanbul
13:45 EET	Ergün Acuner 18'	(Report)		Stadium: Mithatpaşa Stadi; Attendance: 32,905; Referee: Zülbahar Sağnak

17 October 1965 5	Beşiktaş JK	0–1	Galatasaray SK	Istanbul
15:00 EET		(Report)	Metin Oktay 90'	Stadium: Mithatpaşa Stadi; Attendance: 38,101; Referee: Alfred Haberfellner

31 October 1965 6	Göztepe SK	1–0	Galatasaray SK	İzmir
14:45 EET	Erol Boş 41'	(Report)		Stadium: Alsancak Stadium; Attendance: n/a Referee: Erich Linemayr

7 November 1965 7	MKE Ankaragücü SK	0–3	Galatasaray SK	Ankara
14:30 EET		(Report)	Yılmaz Gökdel 27'; Ayhan Elmastaşoğlu 48', 59'	Stadium: 19 Mayıs Stadı; Attendance: n/a Referee: Muzaffer Sarvan

13 November 1965 8	Galatasaray SK	1–1	Altay SK	Istanbul
14:30 EET	Ayhan Elmastaşoğlu 14'	(Report)	Ender İçten 69'	Stadium: Mithatpaşa Stadi; Attendance: 17,834; Referee: Veli Necdet Arığ

28 November 1965 9	Galatasaray SK	2–1	Şeker SK	Istanbul
14:15 EET	Tarık Kutver 64'; Metin Oktay 87'	(Report)	Güngör Sürel 41'	Stadium: Mithatpaşa Stadi; Attendance: 18,689; Referee: Orhan Gönül

5 December 1965 10	Galatasaray SK	2–0	Fenerbahçe SK	Istanbul
15:15 EET	Ayhan Elmastaşoğlu 18', 68'	(Report)		Stadium: Mithatpaşa Stadi; Attendance: 23,674; Referee: Joseph Heimann

11 December 1965 11	Galatasaray SK	3–1	Ankara Demirspor	Istanbul
14:00 EET	Ayhan Elmastaşoğlu 12', 22', 61'	(Report)	Naci Erdem 14' (o.g.)	Stadium: Mithatpaşa Stadi; Attendance: 14,012; Referee: Muzaffer Sarvan

19 December 1965 12	Hacettepe SK	2–2	Galatasaray SK	Ankara
13:45 EET	Ünsal Gönen 15'; Çetin Güler 21'	(Report)	Yılmaz Gökdel 8'; Metin Oktay 71' (pen.)	Stadium: 19 Mayıs Stadı; Attendance: n/a Referee: Ertuğrul Dilek

26 December 1965 13	Galatasaray SK	1–0	Gençlerbirliği SK	Istanbul
14:00 EET	Ergün Acuner 65'	(Report)		Stadium: Mithatpaşa Stadi; Attendance: 22,788; Referee: Rudolf Scheurer

2 January 1966 14	PTT SK	1–0	Galatasaray SK	Ankara
14:00 EET	Feridun Köse 16'	(Report)		Stadium: 19 Mayıs Stadı; Referee: Todor Betchirov

9 January 1966 15	İzmirspor	1–5	Galatasaray SK	İzmir
14:00 EET	Nazım Çamlıbel 66'	(Report)	Bahri Altıntabak 26', 43'; Metin Oktay 41', 85'; Ergün Acuner 69'	Stadium: Alsancak Stadium; Referee: Johannes Malka

29 January 1966 16	Istanbulspor	1–5	Galatasaray SK	Istanbul
14:15 EET	Kosta Kasapoğlu 73' (pen.)	(Report)	Ayhan Elmastaşoğlu 2'; Ergün Acuner 13', 43'; Yılmaz Gökdel 35'; Metin Oktay 86'	Stadium: Ali Sami Yen Stadi; Attendance: n/a Referee: Muzaffer Sarvan

6 February 1966 17	Beykoz 1908 SKD	0–0	Galatasaray SK	Istanbul
12:30 EET		(Report)		Stadium: Mithatpaşa Stadi; Attendance: 39,916; Referee: Faruk Talu

12 February 1966 18	Feriköy SK	1–1	Galatasaray SK	Istanbul
14:45 EET	Mustafa Yücel 51'	(Report)	Metin Oktay 48'	Stadium: Ali Sami Yen Stadi; Attendance: n/a Referee: Veli Necdet Arığ

20 February 1966 19	Vefa SK	1–3	Galatasaray SK	Istanbul
13:00 EET	Zeki Temizer 70'	(Report)	Metin Oktay 31', 48' (pen.); Bahri Altıntabak 40'	Stadium: Mithatpaşa Stadi; Attendance: n/a Referee: Ömer Karadağ

27 February 1966 20	Fenerbahçe SK	0–0	Galatasaray SK	Istanbul
15:00 EET		(Report)		Stadium: Mithatpaşa Stadi; Attendance: 42,940; Referee: Helmut Köhler

5 March 1966 21	Galatasaray SK	5–2	MKE Ankaragücü SK	Istanbul
15:30 EET	Bahri Altıntabak 13'; Turan Doğangün 23', 35'; Uğur Köken 56'; Yılmaz Gökdel 68'	(Report)	Selçuk Yalçıntaş 85', 86'	Stadium: Mithatpaşa Stadi; Attendance: 18,878; Referee: Orhan Gönül

13 March 1966 22	Şeker SK	1–3	Galatasaray SK	Ankara
15:15 EET	Güngör Sürel 72'	(Report)	Ayhan Elmastaşoğlu 23', 86'; Bahri Altıntabak 31'	Stadium: 19 Mayıs Stadı; Attendance: 20,822; Referee: Werner Treichel

19 March 1966 23	Galatasaray SK	0–1	Göztepe SK	Istanbul
15:30 EET		(Report)	Fevzi Zemzem 39'	Stadium: Mithatpaşa Stadi; Attendance: n/a Referee: Gilbert Droz

27 March 1966 24	Galatasaray SK	0–0	Beşiktaş JK	Istanbul
15:30 EET		(Report)		Stadium: Mithatpaşa Stadi; Attendance: 32,983; Referee: Otto Wettenbach

3 April 1966 25	Galatasaray SK	3–0	Izmirspor	Istanbul
15:30 EET	Tarık Kutver 24'; Metin Oktay 77', 87'	(Report)		Stadium: Mithatpaşa Stadi; Attendance: n/a Referee: Sabahattin Ladikli

10 April 1966 26	Galatasaray SK	4–1	Hacettepe SK	Istanbul
15:30 EET	Tarık Kutver 23'; Ayhan Elmastaşoğlu 49'; Turan Doğangün 66'; Metin Oktay 73'	(Report)	Onursal Uraz 27' (pen.)	Stadium: Ali Sami Yen Stadi; Attendance: n/a Referee: Ali Timur

17 April 1966 27	Altay SK	0–1	Galatasaray SK	İzmir
16:00 EET		(Report)	Metin Oktay 56' (pen.)	Stadium: Alsancak Stadium; Attendance: 20,733; Referee: Hüseyin Maloğlu

24 April 1966 28	Galatasaray SK	3–0	PTT SK	Istanbul
15:30 EET	Metin Oktay 36', 56'; Zekai Selli 87' (o.g.)	(Report)		Stadium: Ali Sami Yen Stadi; Attendance: 30,000; Referee: Erich Linemayr

1 May 1966 29	Gençlerbirliği SK	1–0	Galatasaray SK	Ankara
15:45 EET	Abdullah Çevrim 73'	(Report)		Stadium: 19 Mayıs Stadı; Attendance: n/a Referee: Edgar Deuschel

7 May 1966 30	Ankara Demirspor	0–0	Galatasaray SK	Ankara
14:45 EET		(Report)		Stadium: 19 Mayıs Stadı; Attendance: n/a Referee: Muzaffer Sarvan

== Türkiye Kupası ==
Kick-off listed in local time (EET)

=== 1/4 final ===
27 April 1966 1	Galatasaray SK	2–1	MKE Ankaragücü SK	Istanbul
20:00 EET	Turan Doğangün 53'; Kadri Aytaç 83'	(Report)	Candan Dumanlı 37'	Stadium: Mithatpaşa Stadi; Attendance: 10,586; Referee: Muzaffer Sarvan

4 May 1966 2	MKE Ankaragücü SK	0–1	Galatasaray SK	Ankara
19:00 EET		(Report)	Tarık Kutver 78'	Stadium: 19 Mayıs Stadı; Attendance: n/a Referee: Ertuğrul Dilek

=== 1/2 final ===
4 June 1966 1	Fenerbahçe SK	0–0	Galatasaray SK	Istanbul
17:30 EET		(Report)		Stadium: Mithatpaşa Stadi; Attendance: 28,908; Referee: Faruk Talu

12 June 1966 2	Galatasaray SK	3–1	Fenerbahçe SK	Istanbul
16:30 EET	Şeref Has 79' (o.g.); Metin Oktay 100' (pen.); Uğur Köken 113'	(Report)	Yaşar Mumcuoğlu 47'	Stadium: Mithatpaşa Stadi; Attendance: 39,140; Referee: Karl Niemeyer

=== Final ===
19 June 1966 1	Beşiktaş JK	0–1	Galatasaray SK	Istanbul
16:30 EET		(Report)	Turan Doğangün 88'	Stadium: Mithatpaşa Stadi; Attendance: 33,446; Referee: Rudolf Kreitlein

== European Cup Winners' Cup ==
=== First round ===
15 September 1965 1	FC Sion	5–1	Galatasaray SK	Sion
EET	Norbert Eschmann 12', 50'; Rene-Pierre Quentin 55'; Franz Stockbauer 80', 89'	(Report)	Tarık Kutver 43'	Stadium: Parc des Sports; Referee: (Italy) Alessandro D agostini

29 September 1965 2	Galatasaray SK	2–1	FC Sion	Istanbul
EET	Uğur Köken 33'; Ayhan Elmastaşoğlu 59'	(Report)	Claude Sixt 50'	Stadium: Ali Sami Yen Stadi; Attendance: 20,049; Referee: (Socialist Federal Republic of Yugoslavia) Zivko Bajic

== Friendly Matches ==
=== TSYD Kupası ===
18 August 1965	Galatasaray SK	0–1	Fenerbahçe SK	Istanbul
20:30 EET		(Report)	Şenol Birol 11'	Stadium: Mithatpaşa Stadi; Attendance: 26,873; Referee: Faruk Talu

25 August 1965	Beşiktaş JK	3–1	Galatasaray SK	Istanbul
20:30 EET	Ahmet Özacar 10' (pen.); Ahmet Şahin 50', 67'	(Report)	Ayhan Elmastaşoğlu 24'	Stadium: Mithatpaşa Stadi; Attendance: 20,565; Referee: Hakkı Çaktırma

=== Ali Sami Yen – Galip Kulaksızoğlu Kupası ===
24 January 1966	Fenerbahçe SK	1–0	Galatasaray SK	Istanbul
15:00 EET	Ogün Altıparmak 40'	(Report)		Stadium: Mithatpaşa Stadi; Attendance: 18,095; Referee: Muzaffer Sarvan

== Attendance ==
Competition	Av. Att.	Total Att.
1. Lig	23,023	253,231
Türkiye Kupası	24,863	49,726
CWC	20,049	20,049
Total	23,072	323,006
