= Adanır =

Adanır is a Turkish surname. Notable people with the surname include:

- Mete Adanır (1961–1989), Turkish Cypriot footballer
- Recep Adanır (1929–2017), Turkish footballer and manager
