= Libya national football team results (1953–1999) =

This is a list of the Libya national football team results from 1953 until 1999.

== 1953 ==
3 August 1953 Football at the 1953 Pan Arab Games	Libya	5–2	Palestine	Alexandria, Egypt
				Stadium: Alexandria Stadium

6 August 1953 Football at the 1953 Pan Arab Games	Egypt	10–2	Libya	Alexandria, Egypt
				Stadium: Alexandria Stadium

9 August 1953 Football at the 1953 Pan Arab Games	Libya	3–2	Jordan	Alexandria, Egypt
				Stadium: Alexandria Stadium

== 1957 ==
19 October 1957 Football at the 1957 Pan Arab Games	Tunisia	4–3	Libya	Beirut, Lebanon

21 October 1957 Football at the 1957 Pan Arab Games	Morocco	5–1	Libya	Beirut, Lebanon

23 October 1957 Football at the 1957 Pan Arab Games	Iraq	3–1	Libya	Beirut, Lebanon

== 1969 ==
26 January 1969 1970 FIFA World Cup qualification	Libya	2–0	Ethiopia	Tripoli, Libya
				Stadium: 11 June Stadium

9 February 1969 1970 FIFA World Cup qualification	Ethiopia	5–1	Libya	Addis Ababa, Ethiopia
				Stadium: Haile Selassie Stadium

== 1971 ==
3 January 1971 1972 African Cup of Nations qualification	Egypt	2–1	Libya	Cairo, Egypt

13 July 1971 1972 African Cup of Nations qualification	Libya	0–1	Egypt	Tripoli, Libya

16 July 1971 Friendly	Libya	4–6	Sudan	Libya

24 November 1971 Friendly	Libya	0–0	Algeria	Libya

== 1973 ==
11 August 1973 1973 Palestine Cup of Nations	Libya	2–2	United Arab Emirates	Benghazi, Libya
				Stadium: March 28 Stadium

18 August 1973 1973 Palestine Cup of Nations	Libya	0–0	Iraq	Benghazi, Libya
				Stadium: March 28 Stadium

21 August 1973 1973 Palestine Cup of Nations	Libya	0–2	Algeria	Benghazi, Libya
				Stadium: March 28 Stadium

== 1974 ==
24 August 1974 Friendly	Malta	0–1	Libya	Malta

4 September 1974 Friendly	Libya	0–0	Malta	Tripoli, Libya

26 September 1974 Quneitra Cup	Syria	2–1	Libya	Damascus, Syria

4 October 1974 Quneitra Cup	Sudan	3–1	Libya	Damascus, Syria

10 November 1974 1976 African Cup of Nations qualification	Tunisia	1–0	Libya	Tunis, Tunisia
				Stadium: Stade El Menzah

22 November 1974 1976 African Cup of Nations qualification	Libya	1–0 (2–3 p)	Tunisia	Tripoli, Libya

== 1975 ==
26 May 1975 Friendly	Algeria	6–0	Libya	Algeria

31 August 1975 Friendly	Algeria	2–1	Libya	Algeria

== 1976 ==
10 March 1976 Friendly	Malta	2–2	Libya	Malta

1 April 1976 1978 FIFA World Cup qualification	Algeria	1–0	Libya	Algiers, Algeria

16 April 1976 1978 FIFA World Cup qualification	Libya	0–0	Algeria	Tripoli, Libya

8 September 1976 Friendly	Libya	0–1	Algeria

10 September 1976 Friendly	Libya	1–0	Algeria

1 November 1976 Friendly	Algeria	2–0	Libya

== 1977 ==
17 July 1977 Merdeka Tournament	South Korea	4–0	Libya	Kuala Lumpur, Malaysia

19 July 1977 Merdeka Tournament	Libya	0–0	Iraq	Kuala Lumpur, Malaysia

21 July 1977 Merdeka Tournament	Malaysia	1–1	Libya	Kuala Lumpur, Malaysia

23 July 1977 Merdeka Tournament	Thailand	2–2	Libya	Kuala Lumpur, Malaysia

25 July 1977 Merdeka Tournament	Libya	4–0	Indonesia	Kuala Lumpur, Malaysia

27 July 1977 Merdeka Tournament	Libya	1–3	Myanmar	Kuala Lumpur, Malaysia

18 September 1977 1978 African Cup of Nations qualification	Guinea	3–0	Libya	Conakry, Guinea
				Stadium: Stade du 28 Septembre

2 October 1977 1978 African Cup of Nations qualification	Libya	0–2	Guinea	Benghazi, Libya
				Stadium: March 28 Stadium

== 1978 ==
14 May 1978 Friendly	Libya	1–0	Malta	Libya

14 July 1978 Football at the 1978 All-Africa Games	Libya	2–1	Malawi	Algiers, Algeria
				Stadium: July 5, 1962 Stadium

18 July 1978 Football at the 1978 All-Africa Games	Algeria	2–1	Libya	Algiers, Algeria
				Stadium: July 5, 1962 Stadium

22 July 1978 Football at the 1978 All-Africa Games	Egypt	1–0	Libya	Algiers, Algeria
				Stadium: July 5, 1962 Stadium

== 1979 ==
19 August 1979 Friendly	Poland	5–0	Libya	Słupsk, Poland

16 September 1979 1980 African Cup of Nations qualification	Libya	2–1	Ethiopia	Tripoli, Libya
				Stadium: 11 June Stadium

30 September 1979 1980 African Cup of Nations qualification	Ethiopia	1–1	Libya	Addis Ababa, Ethiopia
				Stadium: Addis Ababa Stadium

24 October 1979 1980 African Cup of Nations qualification	Algeria	3–1	Libya	Algiers, Algeria
				Stadium: July 5, 1962 Stadium

6 November 1979 1980 African Cup of Nations qualification	Libya	1–0	Algeria	Tripoli, Libya
				Stadium: 11 June Stadium

== 1980 ==
8 May 1980 1982 FIFA World Cup qualification	Libya	2–1	Gambia	Tripoli, Libya
				Stadium: 11 June Stadium

6 July 1980 1982 FIFA World Cup qualification	Gambia	0–0	Libya	Banjul, Gambia
				Stadium: Box Bar Stadium

1 October 1980 Football at the Islamic Games	Turkey	1–2	Libya	İzmir, Turkey
	Muharrem Gürbüz 24'		Abdulnaser Ezzeddin 35'; Mohamed Ali Omar Lagha 44' (pen.)	Stadium: Atatürk Stadium; Referee: Fahad Al Dehmash (Saudi Arabia)

4 October 1980 Football at the Islamic Games	Libya	2–0	Saudi Arabia	İzmir, Turkey
	Abdulnaser Ezzeddin 69'; Salem Mohammed Mismari 70'	Report		Stadium: Atatürk Stadium; Referee: Erkan Göksel (Turkey)

== 1981 ==
26 June 1981 Friendly	Libya	0–1	Iraq

== 1982 ==
4 February 1982 Friendly	Libya	2–0	Guinea

5 March 1982 1982 African Cup of Nations	Libya	2–2	Ghana	Tripoli, Libya
				Stadium: 11 June Stadium

9 March 1982 1982 African Cup of Nations	Libya	2–0	Tunisia	Tripoli, Libya
				Stadium: 11 June Stadium

12 March 1982 1982 African Cup of Nations	Libya	0–0	Cameroon	Tripoli, Libya
				Stadium: 11 June Stadium

16 March 1982 1982 African Cup of Nations	Libya	2–1	Zambia	Tripoli, Libya
				Stadium: 11 June Stadium

19 March 1982 1982 African Cup of Nations	Libya	0–0 (6–7 p)	Ghana	Tripoli, Libya
				Stadium: 11 June Stadium

== 1983 ==
8 April 1983 1984 African Cup of Nations qualification	Libya	2–1	Senegal

24 April 1983 1984 African Cup of Nations qualification	Senegal	1–0	Libya

24 April 1983 Friendly	Ghana	1–0	Libya

1 May 1983 Friendly	Ethiopia	1–0	Libya

8 May 1983 Football at the 1984 Summer Olympics – Men's qualification	Kenya	1–0	Libya

22 May 1983 Football at the 1984 Summer Olympics – Men's qualification	Libya	2–0	Kenya

13 September 1983 Friendly	Morocco	2–0	Libya

9 October 1983 Friendly	Libya	4–0	Malta

14 October 1983 Football at the 1984 Summer Olympics – Men's qualification	Libya	2–1	Algeria

28 October 1983 Football at the 1984 Summer Olympics – Men's qualification	Algeria	2–0	Libya

== 1985 ==
22 February 1985 1986 FIFA World Cup qualification	Sudan	0–0	Libya	Khartoum, Sudan

8 March 1985 1986 FIFA World Cup qualification	Libya	4–0	Sudan	Tripoli, Libya

29 March 1985 1986 African Cup of Nations qualification	Libya	2–0	Tunisia	Tripoli, Libya
				Stadium: 11 June Stadium

14 April 1985 1986 African Cup of Nations qualification	Tunisia	1–0	Libya	Tunis, Tunisia
				Stadium: Stade El Menzah

14 July 1985 1986 FIFA World Cup qualification	Ghana	0–0	Libya	Accra, Ghana

26 July 1985 1986 FIFA World Cup qualification	Libya	2–0	Ghana	Benghazi, Libya

3 August 1985 Football at the 1985 Pan Arab Games	Iraq	2–0	Libya	Settat, Morocco

7 August 1985 Football at the 1985 Pan Arab Games	Syria	0–2	Libya	Settat, Morocco

23 August 1985 1986 African Cup of Nations qualification	Libya	2–1	Mozambique	Benghazi, Libya
				Stadium: March 28 Stadium

15 September 1985 1986 African Cup of Nations qualification	Mozambique	2–1 (4–3 p)	Libya	Maputo, Mozambique

6 October 1985 1986 FIFA World Cup qualification	Morocco	3–0	Libya	Rabat, Morocco
				Stadium: Prince Moulay Abdellah Stadium

18 October 1985 1986 FIFA World Cup qualification	Libya	1–0	Morocco	Benghazi, Libya
				Stadium: March 28 Stadium

== 1988 ==
10 March 1988 International friendly	Libya	1–0 (Note: The match was abandoned in the 43rd minute following the collapse of a section of the main spectator stand.)	Malta	Tripoli, Libya
	Khair 17'	Report		Stadium: June 11 Stadium; Attendance: 65,000; Referee: Mohamed Ibrahim Assaudi (Libya)

3 June 1988 1990 FIFA World Cup qualification	Libya	3–0	Burkina Faso	Tripoli, Libya
				Stadium: 11 June Stadium

3 July 1988 1990 FIFA World Cup qualification	Burkina Faso	2–0	Libya	Ouagadougou, Burkina Faso
				Stadium: Stade du 4 Août

== 1989 ==
8 January 1989 1990 FIFA World Cup qualification	Ivory Coast	1–0	Libya	Abidjan, Ivory Coast

== 1991 ==
27 November 1991 Friendly	Malta	2–0	Libya	Ta' Qali, Malta

== 1992 ==
9 August 1992 Friendly	Libya	0–0	Niger

12 August 1992 Friendly	Libya	0–1	Mali

14 August 1992 Friendly	Mali	2–1	Libya

== 1997 ==
27 April 1997 Friendly	Lebanon	2–0	Libya

14 July 1997 Football at the 1997 Pan Arab Games	Libya	2–2	Oman	Beirut, Lebanon

17 July 1997 Football at the 1997 Pan Arab Games	Jordan	1–1	Oman	Beirut, Lebanon

19 July 1997 Football at the 1997 Pan Arab Games	Lebanon	2–1	Libya	Beirut, Lebanon

20 September 1997 Friendly	Libya	2–1	Bahrain

23 September 1997 Friendly	Libya	3–1	Chad

25 September 1997 Friendly	Libya	1–1	Jordan

== 1998 ==
2 August 1998 2000 African Cup of Nations qualification	Libya	1–3	Algeria	Tripoli, Libya

14 August 1998 2000 African Cup of Nations qualification	Algeria	3–0	Libya	Algiers, Algeria

13 September 1998 Friendly	Bahrain	2–2	Libya	Qatar

16 September 1998 Friendly	United Arab Emirates	5–1	Libya

22 September 1998 1998 Arab Nations Cup	Qatar	2–1	Libya	Qatar
				Stadium: Jassim bin Hamad Stadium

24 September 1998 1998 Arab Nations Cup	Libya	1–2	Jordan	Qatar
				Stadium: Jassim bin Hamad Stadium

== 1999 ==
16 May 1999 Friendly	Libya	2–1	Senegal

17 August 1999 Football at the 1999 Pan Arab Games	Libya	4–0	Bahrain	Jordan

21 August 1999 Football at the 1999 Pan Arab Games	Iraq	0–2	Libya	Jordan

23 August 1999 Football at the 1999 Pan Arab Games	Syria	1–1	Libya	Jordan

25 August 1999 Football at the 1999 Pan Arab Games	Libya	2–2	Palestine	Jordan

27 August 1999 Football at the 1999 Pan Arab Games	United Arab Emirates	0–1	Libya	Jordan

29 August 1999 Football at the 1999 Pan Arab Games	Iraq	3–1	Libya	Jordan

19 November 1999 Friendly	Libya	2–1	Togo

27 November 1999 Friendly	Zimbabwe	2–1	Libya

4 December 1999 Friendly	Malawi	1–2	Libya

23 December 1999 Friendly	Libya	2–0	Gabon

28 December 1999 Friendly	Libya	2–0	Togo
