= Erbay Gönelli =

Northern Cyprus former footballer (born 1953)

Personal information
- Full name: Ahmet Erbay Gönelli Sr.
- Date of birth: 21 April 1953 (age 73)
- Place of birth: Gönyeli, Cyprus (today Northern Cyprus)
- Position: Striker

Senior career*
Years	Team	Apps	(Gls)
1968–1985	Gönyeli		(206+)
1985–1987	Gunçlur Gücü		(15+)
Total			(221+)

International career
1977–1980	Northern Cyprus	3	(1)
- * Club domestic league appearances and goals

Ahmet Erbay Gönelli Sr., nicknamed "Captain Erbay", (born 21 April 1953) is a Northern Cyprus former footballer who played as a striker.

== Club career ==
=== Gönyeli ===
Gönelli joined Birinci Lig club Gönyeli in 1968, following the lifting of a league-wide suspension in Northern Cyprus that had been in effect since 1963 due to the Cyprus crisis. He won the İkinci Lig during his first season at the club, and he won the Cypriot Cup (Northern Cyprus) in 1971 and his Birinci Lig first league title in 1971–72. He won two more titles in 1977–78, 1980–81 and finished as a runner-up during a further six seasons with the club. During this time, he was also the league's top goalscorer for eight consecutive seasons between 1972–73 and 1980–81, and he was also the top goalscorer in 1983–84.

In his final season with the club in 1984–85, he won the Cypriot Cup (Northern Cyprus) and the President's Cup. He scored no less than 206 goals for Gönyeli during his fifteen seasons with the club as club captain.

=== Gunçlur Gücü ===
Gönelli joined Gunçlur Gücü initially as a coach in 1981 through the persuasion of his uncle Mehmet Kaptan, but he did not join as a player until the 1985–86 season; in his first season at the club he won promotion to the Birinci Lig. He retired after the 1986–87 season, where he finished as Birinci Lig top goalscorer with fifteen goals and as the league's all-time top goalscorer with no less than 221 goals.

== International career ==
Gönelli debuted for Northern Cyprus on 5 January 1977 during the 1–0 loss against Turkey.

Gönelli was called up to represent Northern Cyprus at the 1980 Islamic Games. He scored a goal on 2 October 1980 during the 2–1 victory against Malaysia. He also played in the 1–1 draw against Libya on 3 October 1980.

== Personal life ==
His father Serhan also played for Gönyeli, and he was the club captain when the Birinci Lig was founded in 1955. His grandson Erbay is a youth footballer, and he played in the 2022 Ayia Napa Soccer Tournament.

== Career statistics ==
=== Club ===
Appearances and goals by club, season and competition
Club	Season	League		
Club	Season	Division	Apps	Goals
Gönyeli	1968–69	İkinci Lig		
Gönyeli	1969–70	Birinci Lig		
Gönyeli	1970–71	Birinci Lig		
Gönyeli	1971–72	Birinci Lig		
Gönyeli	1972–73	Birinci Lig		26
Gönyeli	1973–74	Birinci Lig		16
Gönyeli	1974–75	Birinci Lig	— (Note: League season not held due to the Turkish invasion of Cyprus.)	
Gönyeli	1975–76	Birinci Lig		34
Gönyeli	1976–77	Birinci Lig		22
Gönyeli	1977–78	Birinci Lig		31
Gönyeli	1978–79	Birinci Lig		20
Gönyeli	1979–80	Birinci Lig		25
Gönyeli	1980–81	Birinci Lig		18
Gönyeli	1981–82	Birinci Lig		
Gönyeli	1982–83	Birinci Lig		
Gönyeli	1983–84	Birinci Lig		14
Gönyeli	1984–85	Birinci Lig		
Gönyeli	Total		?	206+
Gunçlur Gücü	1985–86	İkinci Lig		
Gunçlur Gücü	1986–87	Birinci Lig		15
Gunçlur Gücü	Total		?	15+
Career total			?	221+

=== International ===
Appearances and goals by national team and year
National team	Year	Apps	Goals
Northern Cyprus	1977	1	0
Northern Cyprus	1978	—	
Northern Cyprus	1979	—	
Northern Cyprus	1980	2	1
Total		3	1

Scores and results list Northern Cyprus' goal tally first, score column indicates score after each Gönelli goal.

List of international goals scored by Erbay Gönelli
No.	Date	Venue	Cap	Opponent	Score	Result	Competition	Ref.
1.	2 October 1980	İzmir Atatürk Stadium, İzmir, Turkey	1	Malaysia	1–0	2–1	1980 Islamic Games	

== Honours ==
Gönyeli

- Birinci Lig: 1971–72, 1977–78, 1980–81; runner-up 1972–73, 1975–76, 1976–77, 1979–80, 1982–83, 1984–85; third place 1970–71
- İkinci Lig: 1968–69
- Cypriot Cup (Northern Cyprus): 1971, 1985
- President's Cup: 1985; runner-up 1981

Gunçlur Gücü

- İkinci Lig: promoted 1985–86

Individual

- Birinci Lig top goalscorer: 1972–73, 1973–74, 1974–75, 1975–76, 1976–77, 1977–78, 1978–79, 1979–80, 1980–81, 1986–87
