= Burak Demireğen =

Turkish footballer

Personal information
- Full name: Burak Demireğen
- Date of birth: 3 August 1993 (age 33)
- Place of birth: Ordu, Turkey
- Positions: Right-back; left-back

Team information
- Current team: Gümüşhanespor

Youth career
- 2006–2012: Orduspor

Senior career*
Years	Team	Apps	(Gls)
2012–2017	Orduspor	58	(4)
2017–2018	Ankara Adliyespor	1	(0)
2018–	Gümüşhanespor	32	(0)
- * Club domestic league appearances and goals as of 18 March 2020

Burak Demireğen (born 3 August 1993) is a Turkish footballer who plays for Gümüşhanespor. He made his Süper Lig debut on 18 May 2013.
