= Okan Öztürk =

Turkish footballer

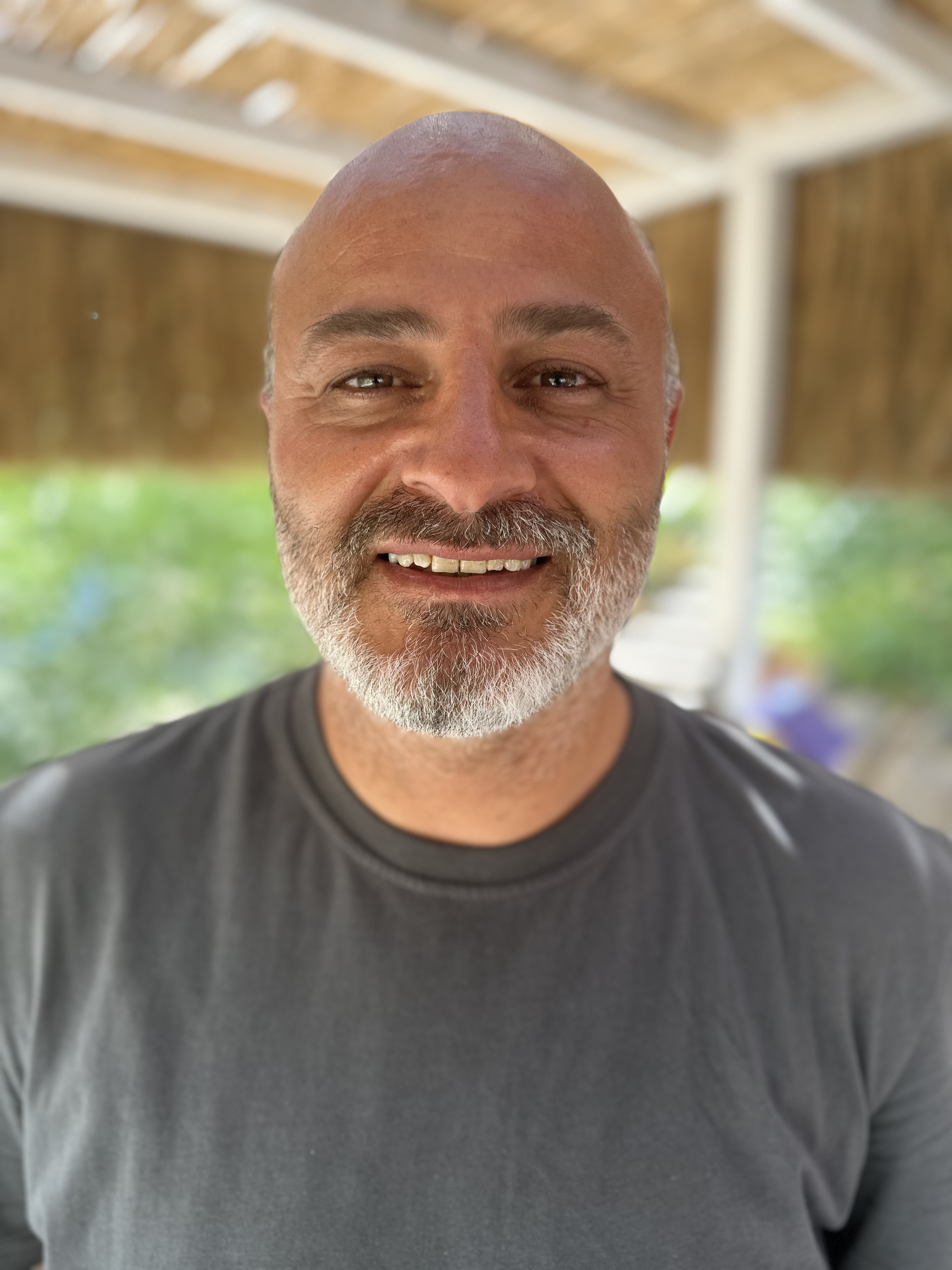
- Öztürk in 2024

Personal information
- Date of birth: 30 November 1977 (age 48)
- Place of birth: Merzifon, Turkey
- Height: 1.85 m (6 ft 1 in)
- Position: Striker

Senior career*
Years	Team	Apps	(Gls)
1995–1996	Merzifonspor	24	(8)
1996–1998	P.T.T.	52	(5)
1998–1999	Altay	0	(0)
1998–1999	→ Batman Petrolspor (loan)	33	(16)
1999–2001	Siirtspor	64	(12)
2001–2006	Çaykur Rizespor	160	(42)
2006–2008	Gençlerbirliği	61	(19)
2008–2009	Çaykur Rizespor	26	(3)
2009–2011	Karşıyaka	58	(14)
2011–2012	Bozüyükspor	23	(11)
2012–2013	Yeni Malatyaspor	23	(7)
- * Club domestic league appearances and goals

Okan Öztürk (born 30 November 1977) is a Turkish former professional footballer who played as a striker.

== Career ==
Öztürk began his professional career with Merzifonspor in 1995, before signing for P.T.T. before the 1996–97 season. He has played seven seasons in the Turkish Süper Lig with Siirtspor, Çaykur Rizespor and Gençlerbirliği S.K., appearing in over 200 league matches and scoring more than 50 goals.
