= Yiğitcan Erdoğan =

Turkish footballer

Yiğitcan
Personal information
- Full name: Yiğitcan Erdoğan
- Date of birth: 13 March 1984 (age 42)
- Place of birth: Istanbul, Turkey
- Height: 1.83 m (6 ft 0 in)
- Position: Centre back

Senior career*
| Years | Team | Apps | (Gls) |
| 2003–2006 | Bakırköyspor | | |
| 2006–2009 | İstanbul | | |
| 2007–2008 | → Orduspor | | |
| 2009–2011 | Altay | 48 | (2) |
| 2011–2013 | Şanlıurfaspor | 40 | (1) |
| 2013–2015 | Adana Demirspor | 47 | (4) |
| 2015–2016 | Balıkesirspor | 10 | (0) |
| 2016–2017 | Yeni Malatyaspor | 33 | (1) |
| 2017–2018 | Adana Demirspor | 32 | (3) |
| 2018–2019 | Fatih Karagümrük | 6 | (0) |
| 2019–2023 | Elazığspor | 87 | (4) |
- * Club domestic league appearances and goals

Yiğitcan Erdoğan (born 13 March 1984) is a Turkish former footballer who played as a defender.

== Career ==
=== Elazığspor ===
On the last day of the January transfer market 2019, Erdoğan was one of 22 players on two hours, that signed for Turkish club Elazığspor. had been placed under a transfer embargo but managed to negotiate it with the Turkish FA, leading to them going on a mad spree of signing and registering a load of players despite not even having a permanent manager in place. In just two hours, they managed to snap up a record 22 players - 12 coming in on permanent contracts and a further 10 joining on loan deals until the end of the season.
