= Football at the Islamic Games =

Tournament details
- Host country: Turkey
- Dates: 28 September – 5 October 1980
- Teams: 5 (from 3 confederations)
- Venue: 1 (in 1 host city)

Final positions
- Champions: Libya
- Runners-up: Turkey
- Third place: Saudi Arabia
- Fourth place: Northern Cyprus

Tournament statistics
- Matches played: 10
- Goals scored: 27 (2.7 per match)
- Top scorer: (Turkey) Tuncay Soyak (3 goals)

The Football tournament at the Islamic Games was won by Libya. The final tournament was held in İzmir from 28 September to 5 October 1980 as a five-team round-robin competition with no final.

== Main venue ==
İzmir is located in Turkey	İzmir
İzmir is located in Turkey	Atatürk Stadium
İzmir is located in Turkey	Capacity: 70,000

== Final tournament ==
=== Group standings ===
Team	Pld	W	D	L	GF	GA	GD	Pts
Libya	4	3	1	0	6	2	+4	7
Turkey	4	3	0	1	12	2	+10	6
Saudi Arabia	4	2	0	2	5	5	0	4
Northern Cyprus	4	1	1	2	3	9	-6	3
Malaysia	4	0	0	4	1	9	−8	0

28 September 1980

Turkey	5 – 0	Northern Cyprus
Serdar Bali 18'; Zafer Bilgetay 31'; Metin Yıldız 54'; Muharrem Gürbüz 66'; Necdet Ergün 74'

Atatürk Stadium, İzmir
Referee: Zayn Al Abidin Alaadin (Malaysia)

29 September 1980

Saudi Arabia	3 – 0	Malaysia
Majed Abdullah 30'; Amin Dabo 35'; Darwish Saeed 72'	Report

Atatürk Stadium, İzmir
Attendance: 1,000

30 September 1980

Libya	1 – 0	Malaysia
Giumbu 38'

Alsancak Stadium, İzmir

30 September 1980

Northern Cyprus	0 – 2	Saudi Arabia
		Majed Abdullah 8'; Amin Dabo 46'

Alsancak Stadium, İzmir

1 October 1980

Turkey	1 – 2	Libya
Muharrem Gürbüz 24'		Abdulnaser Ezzeddin 35'; Mohamed Ali Omar Lagha 44' (pen.)

Atatürk Stadium, İzmir
Referee: Fahad Al Dehmash (Saudi Arabia)

2 October 1980

Northern Cyprus	2 – 1	Malaysia
Erbay Gönelli 5'; Mete Adanır 78'		Zainal 19' (pen.)

Atatürk Stadium, İzmir

3 October 1980

Libya	1 – 1	Northern Cyprus
Fikri 47' (o.g.)		Mete Adanır 21'

Atatürk Stadium, İzmir

3 October 1980

Turkey	3 – 0	Saudi Arabia
Tuncay Soyak 2'; Saleh Al-Nu'eimeh 34' (o.g.); Zafer Bilgetay 80'	Report

Atatürk Stadium, İzmir
Attendance: 5,591
Referee: Zayn Al Abidin Alaadin (Malaysia)

4 October 1980

Libya	2 – 0	Saudi Arabia
Abdulnaser Ezzeddin 69'; Salem Mohammed Mismari 70'	Report

Atatürk Stadium, İzmir
Referee: Erkan Göksel (Turkey)

5 October 1980

Turkey	3 – 0	Malaysia
Metin Yıldız 33'; Tuncay Soyak 66', 86'	Report

Atatürk Stadium, İzmir
Referee: Musaid Al Saeed (Saudi Arabia)

== Winners ==
Football tournament winners

Libya
First title
