= Levent Devrim =

Turkish football manager

Personal information
- Full name: Levent Devrim
- Date of birth: 26 August 1969 (age 57)
- Place of birth: Hatay Province, Turkey
- Position: Midfielder

Senior career*
Years	Team	Apps	(Gls)
1990–1993	Konyaspor		
1993–1995	Kayserispor		
1995–1996	Bursaspor		
1996–1999	Kayserispor		
1999–2000	Konyaspor		
2000–2003	Çanakkale Dardanelspor		
Total		312	(53)

Managerial career
- 2004–2005: Tarsus İdman Yurdu (assistant)
- 2005–2006: Eskişehirspor (assistant)
- 2006: Dardanelspor (assistant)
- 2006: Dardanelspor
- 2007: İzmirspor
- 2007–2008: İnegölspor
- 2008–2009: Yimpaş Yozgatspor
- 2009: İzmirspor
- 2010–2011: Kayseri Erciyesspor
- 2012: Tavşanlı Linyitspor
- 2012: Tavşanlı Linyitspor
- 2014: Orduspor
- 2017–2019: Manisa BB
- * Club domestic league appearances and goals

Levent Devrim (born 26 August 1969) is a Turkish football manager who last managed Manisa Büyüksehir Belediyespor.

Devrim played professional football as a midfielder successively for Konyaspor, Kayserispor, Bursaspor and finished his career with Çanakkale Dardanelspor in 2003. He was known "Küçük Levent" (Small Levent) his first spell in Kayserispor between 1993 and 1995, as he was younger than the team's forward, Levent Kurt (Büyük Levent).
