= KTFF Super Cup =

- Founded: 1981; 45 years ago
- Region: Northern Cyprus
- Teams: 2
- Current champions: Mağusa Türk Gücü (7th title)
- Most championships: Çetinkaya Türk SK (9 titles)
- KTFF Super Cup 2025

The KTFF Super Cup (Turkish: KTFF Süper Kupası), formerly known as Cumhurbaşkanlığı Kupası ("Presidential Cup"), was the super cup tournament of the Cyprus Turkish Football Federation, Turkish Republic of Northern Cyprus.

Created in 1981, it was contested between the winners of KTFF Süper Lig and the Cypriot Cup before the beginning of a season.

== KTFF Super Cup Winners ==
List of finals:

=== President's Cup (Cumhurbaşkanlığı Kupası) ===
- 1981: Gençlik Gücü 5–4 Gönyeli
- 1982: Türk Ocağı Limasol 1–0 Mağusa Türk Gücü
- 1983: Mağusa Türk Gücü
- 1984: Türk Ocağı Limasol 3–1 Yenicami Ağdelen
- 1985: Gönyeli 5–1 Küçük Kaymaklı
- 1986: Mağusa Türk Gücü 2–1 Küçük Kaymaklı
- 1987: Baf Ülkü Yurdu 2–0 Mağusa Türk Gücü
- 1988: Baf Ülkü Yurdu 1–0 Küçük Kaymaklı
- 1989: Baf Ülkü Yurdu 2–1 Yenicami Ağdelen
- 1990: Türk Ocağı Limasol 1–0 Baf Ülkü Yurdu
- 1991: Çetinkaya (7–5 p) Doğan Türk Birliği
- 1992: Çetinkaya 3–2 Doğan Türk Birliği
- 1993: Çetinkaya (2–1 p) Gönyeli
- 1994: Yalova SK (6–5 p) Doğan Türk Birliği
- 1995: Gönyeli 2–0 Yalova
- 1996: Çetinkaya 6–1 Akıncılar
- 1997: Küçük Kaymaklı 1–0 Çetinkaya
- 1998: Çetinkaya 3–2 Gönyeli
- 1999: Gönyeli 6–3 Çetinkaya
- 2000: Gönyeli 3–2 Çetinkaya
- 2001: Çetinkaya 4–0 Gönyeli

=== London Cup (Londra Kupası) ===
- 2006: Çetinkaya 1–1 (6–5 p) Mağusa Türk Gücü [in London]

=== Super Cup (Süper Kupa) ===
- 2011 : Çetinkaya 2–1 Küçük Kaymaklı
- 2012 : Çetinkaya 4–2 Doğan Türk Birliği
- 2013 : Yenicami Ağdelen 1–1 (5–3 p) Çetinkaya
- 2014 : Yenicami Ağdelen 3–1 (a.e.t.) Lefke
- 2015 : Yenicami Ağdelen 1–0 (a.e.t.) Mormenekşe Gençler Birliği
- 2016 : Mağusa Türk Gücü 3–2 Küçük Kaymaklı
- 2017 : Türk Ocağı Limasol 3–2 (a.e.t.) Yenicami Ağdelen
- 2018 : Yenicami Ağdelen 3–0 Cihangir
- 2019 : Yenicami Ağdelen 1–1 (4–3 p) Mağusa Türk Gücü
- 2020 : Mağusa Türk Gücü 4–0 (a.e.t.) Yenicami Ağdelen
- 2023 : Mağusa Türk Gücü 2–0 Türk Ocağı Limasol
- 2024 : Mağusa Türk Gücü 2–1 Göçmenköy İdman Yurdu
- 2025 : Mağusa Türk Gücü 3–1 Lefke

== Performance by club ==
Team	Titles	Winning years
Çetinkaya	9	1991, 1992, 1993, 1996, 1998, 2001, 2006, 2011, 2012
Mağusa Türk Gücü	7	1983, 1986, 2016, 2020, 2023, 2024, 2025
Yenicami Ağdelen	5	2013, 2014, 2015, 2018, 2019
Gönyeli	4	1985, 1995, 1999, 2000
Türk Ocağı Limasol	4	1982, 1984, 1990, 2017
Baf Ülkü Yurdu	3	1987, 1988, 1989
Gençlik Gücü	1	1981
Yalova SK	1	1994
Küçük Kaymaklı	1	1997
