= Göksu Türkdoğan =

Turkish footballer

Personal information
- Date of birth: 15 April 1985 (age 41)
- Place of birth: Üsküdar, Turkey
- Height: 1.82 m (6 ft 0 in)
- Position: Forward

Team information
- Current team: Bornova FK
- Number: 11

Youth career
- 2006: Yeniköyspor

Senior career*
Years	Team	Apps	(Gls)
2006–2009	Pendikspor	86	(19)
2009–2010	Sarıyer	22	(5)
2010–2012	Elazığspor	65	(21)
2012–2013	Erciyesspor	15	(3)
2013–2014	Ankaraspor	27	(5)
2014–2016	Altınordu	76	(28)
2017–2018	Samsunspor	45	(9)
2018–2019	Bodrumspor	30	(13)
2019–2020	Tuzlaspor	29	(9)
2020–2021	Pendikspor	33	(12)
2021–2022	Etimesgut Belediyespor	33	(7)
2022–2023	İnegöl Kafkas Gençlikspor		
2023–	Bornova FK	1	(0)
- * Club domestic league appearances and goals as of 1 October 2023

Goksu Turkdogan (born 15 April 1985) is a Turkish professional footballer who plays for TFF Third League side Bornova FK.
