= Ramazan Kahya =

Turkish footballer (born 1984)

Personal information
- Date of birth: 16 September 1984 (age 42)
- Place of birth: Bornova, İzmir, Turkey
- Height: 1.78 m (5 ft 10 in)
- Position: Left back

Youth career
- 1999–2000: Çamdibigücü
- 2000–2003: Altay

Senior career*
Years	Team	Apps	(Gls)
2003–2005	Altay	26	(1)
2005–2009	Malatyaspor	85	(4)
2006	→ Sakaryaspor (loan)	17	(1)
2009	Ankaraspor	6	(0)
2009–2011	Konyaspor	24	(2)
2011–2012	Göztepe	40	(1)
2012–2016	Yeni Malatyaspor	154	(12)
2016–2017	Gaziantep B.B.	13	(0)
2017–2018	Kahramanmaraşspor	29	(4)
2019	Ankara Demirspor	17	(2)
- * Club domestic league appearances and goals

Ramazan Kahya (born 16 September 1984) is a Turkish former professional footballer who played as a Full-back. Kahya has also been capped by the Turkey Olympic team.
