= Merzifonspor =

- Full name: Merzifonspor Kulübü
- Founded: 1968; 57 years ago
- President: Nihat Sarıipek
- Head coach: Ercan Pektaş
Home colours	Away colours

Merzifonspor is a football club founded in 1968 in the Merzifon district of Amasya province. The club plays its home matches at Merzifon District Stadium with a capacity of 5,450 people. There is a fan group called Varoşlar, meaning “suburbs”. The club plays in the Amasya 1st Amateur League in the 2022–2023 season.

== Badge ==
Merzifonspor's crest includes the club's main colors, blue and white. In the middle of the coat of arms, there is the silhouette of Merzifonlu Kara Mustafa Pasha. On the lower side of the emblem, the year 1968, the year of establishment of Merzifonspor, is written. On the upper side of the coat of arms is the flag of the Republic of Turkey.

== History ==
The club was founded in Merzifon in 1968, Merzifonspor was included in professional leagues with the establishment of the Turkish 3rd Football League in 1984. He played professional football in this league for 17 seasons. However, at the end of the 2003–2004 season, it was relegated to the Amateur League. The club, which started to compete in the Regional Amateur League in the 2013–2014 season, returned to the amateur league after losing the play-out match at the end of the season. In the 2018–2019 season, the champion of Amasya 1st Amateur League, the team defeated Yeni Amasyaspor 2–1 in the Regional Amateur League Play-out match and promoted to the Regional Amateur League. After struggling here for 3 seasons, he finished the 2021–2022 season in the 2nd place and played a play-out match to stay in the league. As a result of the loss of Merzifonspor - Suluova Belediyespor match, played at Amasya 12 June Stadium, 2–1, the club relegated to the Amasya 1st Amateur League.

== League participations ==
- TFF Third League (3rd Division:) : 1984–2004
- Regional Amateur League: 2013–2014, 2019–2022
- Super Amator League: 1968–1984, 2004–2013, 2014–2019, 2022–

== Managers ==
- Mehmet Ali Çınar (1991–1993)
- Kemal Dikmen (1993–1994)
- İsa Gabralı (1994–1995)
- İsa Gabralı (1996)
- Cahit Dikici (1997)
- İsa Gabralı (1998–1999)
- İsa Gabralı (2003–2004)
