= Mehmet Ali Çınar =

Turkish football manager

Personal information
- Date of birth: 10 March 1949 (age 77)
- Place of birth: Trabzon, Turkey

Managerial career
- Years: Team
- 1989–1991: Samsunspor (assistant)
- 1991: Samsunspor
- 1991–1992: Merzifonspor (assistant)
- 1992–1993: Merzifonspor
- 1993–1997: Samsunspor (assistant)
- 1997–1998: Kayserispor (assistant)
- 1998: Samsunspor
- 1998–1999: Amasyaspor
- 1999: Hacılar Erciyesspor
- 2001: Dalaman Kağıtspor
- 2001–2002: Çarşambaspor
- 2002–2003: Adiyamanspor
- 2003–2005: Fethiyespor
- 2005–2009: Marmaris Belediye
- 2010–2011: Adiyamanspor
- 2011–2012: Samsunspor (youth)
- 2012–2013: Tekirdağspor

Mehmet Ali Çınar (born 10 March 1949) is a Turkish football manager.
