= 19 September Stadium =

Football stadium in Ordu, Turkey

Coordinates: 40°58′56″N 37°52′42″E

- 19 Eylül Stadyumu
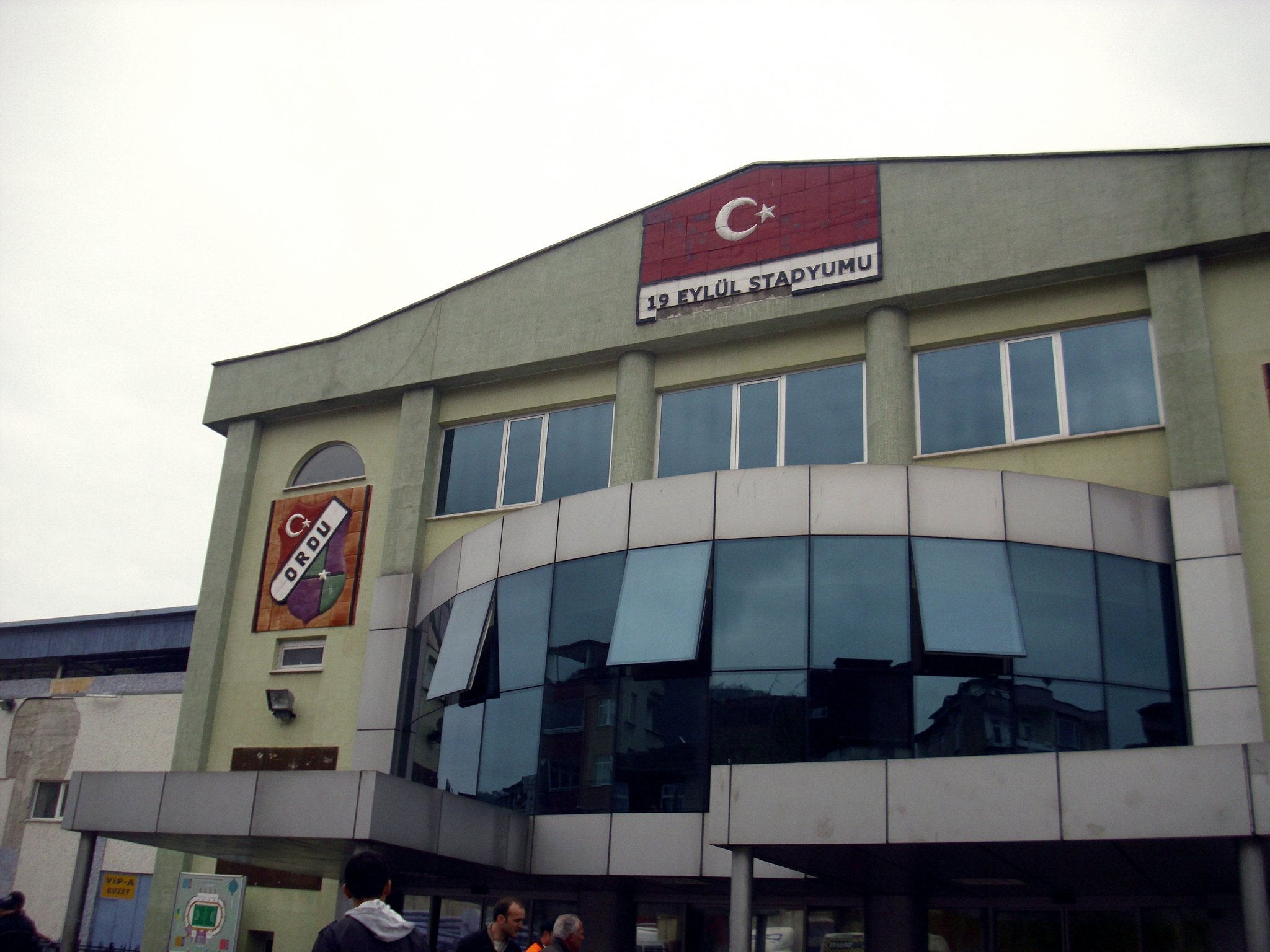
- Interactive map of 19 September Stadium
- Location: Ordu, Turkey
- Owner: Orduspor
- Operator: Orduspor
- Capacity: 11,024
- Surface: Grass

Construction
- Groundbreaking: 1967
- Opened: 1967
- Closed: 2021
- Demolished: 2023

Tenants
- 52 Orduspor, Orduspor, Ordu Demirspor

The 19 September Stadium (Turkish: 19 Eylül Stadyumu) was a multi-use stadium in Ordu, Turkey. It was used mostly for football matches and was the home ground of 52 Orduspor and Orduspor. The stadium held 11,024 people and was built in 1967.
