= Mete Adanır =

Turkish Cypriot footballer

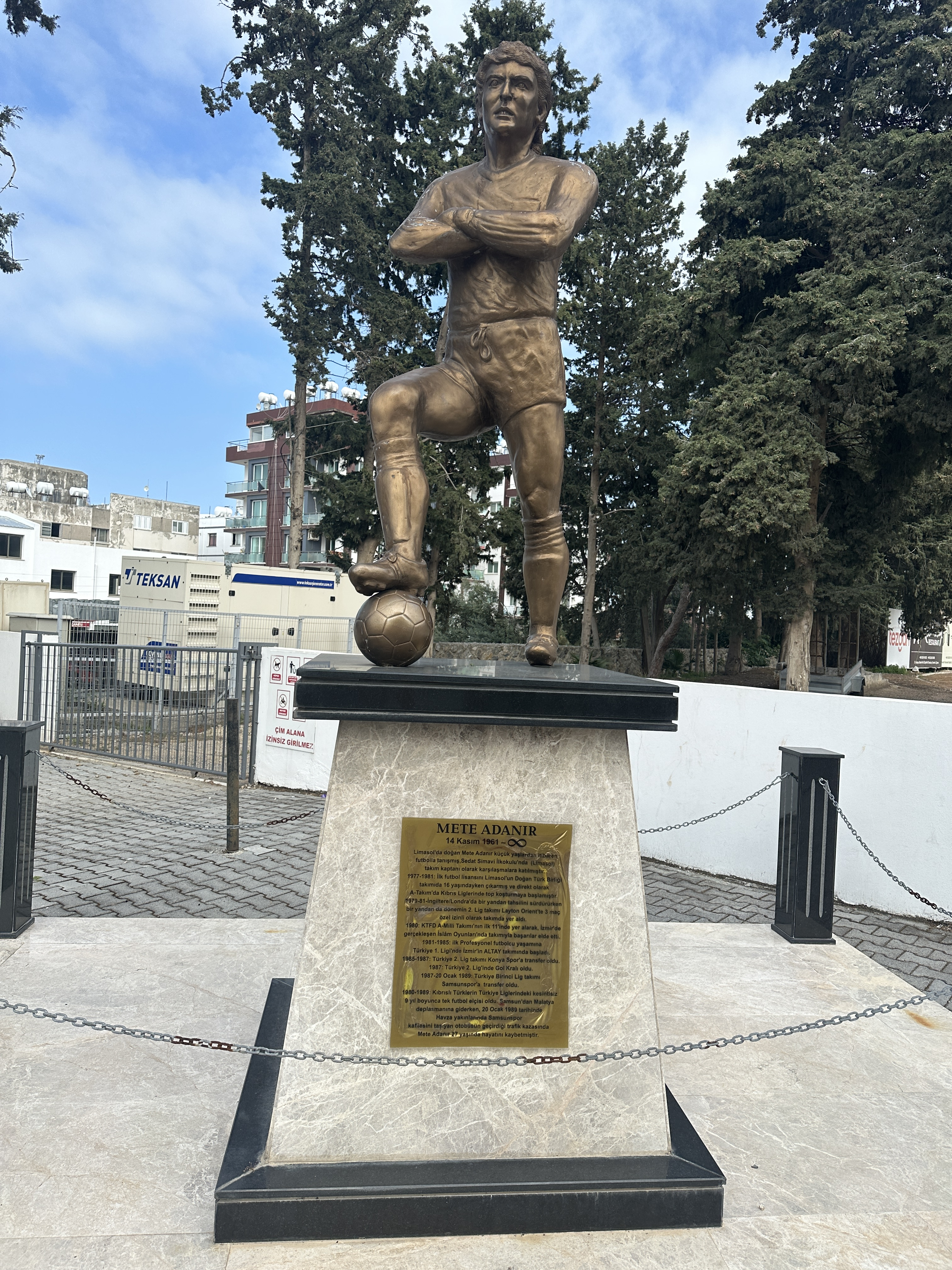

Personal information
- Full name: Mete Adanır
- Date of birth: 14 November 1961
- Place of birth: Limassol, Southern Cyprus
- Date of death: 20 January 1989 (aged 27)
- Place of death: Havza, Samsun Province, Turkey
- Position: Forward

Youth career
- –1979: Doğan Türk Birliği
- 1979–1980: Leyton Orient

Senior career*
Years	Team	Apps	(Gls)
1980	Leyton Orient	4	(1)
1981–1985	Altay	55	(13)
1985–1987	Konyaspor	54	(33)
1987–1989	Samsunspor	38	(3)
Total		153	(50)

International career
1980	Northern Cyprus	4	(2)
- * Club domestic league appearances and goals

Mete Adanır (14 November 1961 – 20 January 1989) was a Turkish Cypriot football forward who played for clubs in England and Turkey.

== Career ==
Born in Limassol, Cyprus, Adanır began playing youth football for local side Doğan Türk Birliği. He moved to England in September 1979 to pursue higher education. While studying, he joined Leyton Orient F.C.'s youth side. Six months later, he signed with the senior side and began playing with the reserves. However, the club was unable to get clearance from the Cyprus football association and cancelled his registration.

Still living in England, Adanır played at the Islamic Games where he was scouted by Turkish Süper Lig club Altay S.K. He joined Altay at the beginning of the 1981–82 season, and would spend four seasons with the club, three of them in the first division.

He moved to second division side Konyaspor, where he would enjoy success. He scored 25 goals during the 1985-86 season and was named the Konya sportsman of the year.

After impressing at Konyaspor, Adanır signed with Süper Lig side Samsunspor in July 1987, where he would make 38 league appearances before his death.

== Death ==
The Samsunspor team bus was involved in a traffic accident in Havza on the way to a match against Malatyaspor in Malatya on 20 January 1989, killing the team coach, five players, among them Adanır, and the bus driver instantly.

== Career statistics ==
=== Club ===
Appearances and goals by club, season and competition
Club	Season	League		
Club	Season	Division	Apps	Goals
Leyton Orient	1979–80	Football League Second Division	4	1
Altay	1981–82	1.Lig	10	0
Altay	1982–83	1.Lig	15	1
Altay	1983–84	1.Lig	2	2
Altay	1984–85	1.Lig	30	10
Konyaspor	1985–86	2.Lig	26	19
Konyaspor	1986–87	2.Lig	28	14
Samsunspor	1987–88	1.Lig	27	3
Samsunspor	1988–89	1.Lig	11	0
Career total			153	50

=== International ===
Appearances and goals by national team and year
National team	Year	Apps	Goals
Northern Cyprus	1980	4	2
Total		4	2

Scores and results list Northern Cyprus' goal tally first, score column indicates score after each Adanır goal.

No.	Date	Venue	Cap	Opponent	Score	Result	Competition
1.	2 October 1980	İzmir Atatürk Stadium, İzmir, Turkey	1	Malaysia	2–1	2–1	1980 Islamic Games
2.	3 October 1980	İzmir Atatürk Stadium, İzmir, Turkey	2	Libya	1–0	1–1	1980 Islamic Games
