= Candan Dumanlı =

Turkish footballer (1939–2026)

Personal information
- Date of birth: 7 January 1939
- Place of birth: Kayseri, Turkey
- Date of death: 26 February 2026 (aged 87)
- Position: Winger

Senior career*
Years	Team	Apps	(Gls)
1957–1959	Kayseri Şekerspor		
1959–1971	Ankaragücü		

International career
1962	Turkey	2	(0)

Managerial career
- Turkey U21
- 1978–1979: Diyarbakırspor
- 1979–1980: Eskişehirspor
- 1980–1981: Orduspor
- 1981–1982: Mersin İdman Yurdu
- 1983–1984: Adanaspor
- 1985–1986: Malatyaspor
- 1986–1987: Kayseri Erciyesspor
- 1990–1991: Tarsus İdman Yurdu
- 1991–1992: Muşspor
- 1992–1993: MKE Ankaragücü
- 1993–1994: Petrol Ofisi
- 1994–1995: Eskişehirspor
- 1996: Mersin İdman Yurdu
- 1996: Eskişehirspor
- * Club domestic league appearances and goals

Candan Dumanlı (7 January 1939 – 26 February 2026) was a Turkish football player and manager who played as a winger. He died on 26 February 2026, at the age of 87.
