= Abdülkerim Durmaz =

Turkish pundit and former association football player

Personal information
- Full name: Abdülkerim Durmaz
- Date of birth: 13 September 1960 (age 66)
- Place of birth: Istanbul
- Position: Defender

Youth career
- 1975–1978: Fatih Karagümrük

Senior career*
Years	Team	Apps	(Gls)
1978–1984	Fatih Karagümrük	27	(4)
1984–1988	Fenerbahçe	103	(5)
1988–1989	Ankaragücü	15	(0)
1989–1990	Sakaryaspor	12	(0)
1992–1993	Zeytinburnuspor	14	(0)
1993–1995	Fatih Karagümrük	10	(7)
1995–1996	Güngören Belediyespor	20	(1)

International career
1984	Turkey U-21	1	(0)
1984–1986	Turkey	11	(0)

Managerial career
- 1996–1997: Fatih Karagümrük
- 1999–2000: Güngören Belediyespor
- 2000–2001: Eyüpspor
- 2001–2003: Fatih Karagümrük
- 2003–2004: Güngören Belediyespor
- 2005: Kasımpaşa
- 2006–2007: Kahramanmaraşspor
- 2007–2008: Mersin İY
- 2009: Adana Demirspor
- 2010–2011: Pendikspor
- * Club domestic league appearances and goals

Abdülkerim Durmaz (born 13 September 1960) is a Turkish pundit and former international association football player. He represented Turkey at the senior level in 11 international encounters.

== Honours ==
Fenerbahçe

- Turkish Super League (1): 1984–85
- Turkish Cup (1): 1984–85
- TSYD Cup (2): 1985–86, 1986–87
- Fleet Cup (1): 1984–85

== Filmography and television ==
=== Film ===
Year	Title	Role	Notes
2016	Adam mısın!	Himself	

=== Television ===
Year	Channel	Title	Notes
2015– 2025	Beyaz TV	Beyaz Futbol (on Sundays); Derin Futbol (on Mondays)	Pundit
2011	YouTube	Fatih Karagümrük Documentary	Storyteller
