= Yücel İldiz =

Turkish football manager (born 1953)

Personal information
- Full name: Yücel İldiz
- Date of birth: June 4, 1953 (age 73)
- Place of birth: Adana, Turkey

Managerial career
- Years: Team
- 1990–1991: Hatayspor
- 1991: Diyarbakırspor
- 1991–1993: Adanaspor
- 1993–1994: Hatayspor
- 1994–1995: Diyarbakırspor
- 1995: Hatayspor
- 1995–1996: Adana Demirspor
- 1996–1997: Şanlıurfaspor
- 1997–1998: Malatyaspor
- 1998–2000: Hatayspor
- 2000–2003: Malatyaspor
- 2003–2004: Mersin İdmanyurdu
- 2004–2007: Orduspor
- 2007–2008: Samsunspor
- 2008–2009: Orduspor
- 2009–2011: Karabükspor
- 2015: Yeni Malatyaspor
- 2015–2016: Karabükspor
- 2016–2017: Giresunspor
- 2017–2018: Eskişehirspor
- 2018–2019: Denizlispor
- 2020–2021: Altay

Yücel İldiz (born 4 June 1953) is a UEFA Pro Licensed Turkish football manager.

He has managed several clubs around Turkey, most notably Malatyaspor and Orduspor.
