= Kemal Kılıç =

Turkish footballer

Personal information
- Full name: Mustafa Kemal Kılıç
- Date of birth: 25 April 1956 (age 70)
- Place of birth: Adana, Turkey
- Position: Midfielder

Senior career*
Years	Team	Apps	(Gls)
1974–1975	Adanaspor		
1975–1976	Zonguldakspor		
1976–1980	Beşiktaş		
1980–1981	Altay Izmir		
1981–1983	Kayserispor		
1983–1985	Ankaragücü		
1985–1986	Kayserispor		
1986–1988	Bakırköyspor		

Managerial career
- 1989–1991: Yücespor
- 1991–1993: Bakırköyspor (assistant)
- 1993–1995: Bakırköyspor
- 1995: Adanaspor (assistant)
- 1995–1997: Gaziosmanpaşaspor
- 1997–1998: Konyaspor
- 1998–1999: Kayseri Erciyesspor
- 1999–2000: Konyaspor
- 2000–2001: Kayseri Erciyesspor
- 2001: Gaziosmanpaşaspor
- 2001–2002: Bakırköyspor
- 2002–2003: Karşıyaka
- 2003–2004: Sivasspor
- 2004–2005: Elazığspor
- 2005–2006: Eskişehirspor
- 2006: Boluspor
- 2006–2007: Yozgatspor
- 2007–2008: Adanaspor
- 2008–2009: Bucaspor
- 2009–2010: Adanaspor
- 2010–2011: Karşıyaka
- 2011–2012: Şanlıurfaspor
- 2012–2013: Göztepe
- 2013: Bucaspor
- 2014: Kocaelispor
- 2015: Bandırmaspor
- 2015–2016: Ankaragücü
- 2016–2017: Şanlıurfaspor
- 2017: Erzurum BB
- 2017: Adanaspor
- 2017–2018: Kastamonuspor
- 2018: Şanlıurfaspor
- 2019: Giresunspor
- 2020: 24 Erzincanspor
- 2020: Şanlıurfaspor
- 2020–2021: Düzcespor
- 2022: Bayrampaşa
- 2022: Şanlıurfaspor
- 2022–2023: Adanaspor
- 2023: Denizlispor
- 2023: Adanaspor
- 2023–2024: Diyarbekirspor
- 2024: Sarıyer S.K.
- 2024: Adanaspor
- 2025: Şanlıurfaspor
- * Club domestic league appearances and goals

Mustafa Kemal Kılıç (born 25 April 1956) is a Turkish football manager and a former player who is the manager of Şanlıurfaspor. He played as a midfielder.
