= Mustafa Uğur =

Turkish footballer

Personal information
- Date of birth: 19 January 1963 (age 63)
- Place of birth: Kayseri, Turkey
- Position: Midfielder

Senior career*
| Years | Team | Apps | (Gls) |
| 1982–1997 | Kayseri Erciyesspor | | |
| 1997–1998 | Küçükçekmece | | |

Managerial career
- 1997–1998: Kayseri Erciyesspor (assistant)
- 1998–1999: Kayseri Erciyesspor (youth)
- 1999–2000: Kayseri Erciyesspor (assistant)
- 2000: Kayseri Erciyesspor
- 2004–2006: Kayseri Erciyesspor
- 2007: Samsunspor
- 2008: Diyarbakırspor
- 2008: Kayseri Erciyesspor
- 2009–2010: Boluspor
- 2011–2012: Karşıyaka
- 2012–2013: Adana Demirspor
- 2013–2014: Adana Demirspor
- 2014: Yeni Malatyaspor
- 2017–2018: Bandırmaspor
- 2018: Adana Demirspor
- 2018–2019: Sancaktepe
- * Club domestic league appearances and goals

Mustafa Uğur (born 19 January 1963) is a Turkish football manager and former player.

== Coaching career ==
In 2009 Uğur obtained a UEFA Pro License.
