= Yılmaz Gökdel =

Turkish footballer and manager (1940–2019)

Personal information
- Date of birth: 20 February 1940
- Place of birth: Istanbul, Turkey
- Date of death: 4 November 2019 (aged 79)
- Height: 1.66 m (5 ft 5 in)
- Position: Midfielder

Senior career*
Years	Team	Apps	(Gls)
1956–1957	Süleymaniye Sirkeci		
1957–1959	Sarıyer		
1959–1963	Beykozspor		
1963–1968	Galatasaray		
1968–1969	Vefa		
1969–1970	Galatasaray		

International career
1964–1965	Turkey	5	(0)

Managerial career
- 1972–1973: Galatasaray (assistant)
- 1973–1974: Ümraniyespor
- 1975–1976: Galatasaray (assistant)
- 1976–1977: Malatyaspor
- 1977–1978: Konya İdman Yurdu
- 1978–1980: Gaziantepspor
- 1981–1982: Ankaragücü
- 1982–1983: Kocaelispor
- 1983–1985: Antalyaspor
- 1984–1985: Turkey U21
- 1985: Turkey
- 1985–1986: Kocaelispor
- 1986: Diyarbakırspor
- 1986–1988: Antalyaspor
- 1988–1989: Bursaspor
- 1990: Samsunspor
- 1991: Kartalspor
- 1991–1993: Gaziantepspor
- 1994–1995: Kartalspor
- 1995–1996: Yalovaspor
- 1996: Beylerbeyi
- * Club domestic league appearances and goals

Yılmaz Gökdel (20 February 1940 – 4 November 2019) was a Turkish football midfielder and later manager. He was capped 5 times for Turkey, and also managed the national team.
