= Ahmet Tuna Kozan =

Turkish footballer

Personal information
- Date of birth: 1943
- Place of birth: Sivrice, Turkey
- Date of death: 20 February 1988 (aged 44–45)
- Position: Midfielder

International career
Years	Team	Apps	(Gls)
- Turkey

Ahmet Tuna Kozan (1943 – 20 February 1988) was a Turkish footballer. He competed in the men's tournament at the 1960 Summer Olympics.
