= Zafer Bilgetay =

Turkish footballer

Personal information
- Date of birth: 15 October 1956 (age 70)
- Place of birth: Seferihisar, İzmir, Turkey
- Position: Defender

Senior career*
Years	Team	Apps	(Gls)
1974–1975	Petrol Ofisi		
1975–1986	Altay		
1986–1988	Bakırköyspor		

International career
1980–1981	Turkey	5	(1)

Managerial career
- 1989–1990: Bigaspor
- 1991–1992: Manisaspor (assistant)
- 1992–1993: Altınordu
- 1993–1994: Alpetspor
- 1994–1996: Altay (assistant)
- 1996: Çanakkale Dardanelspor (assistant)
- 1997: Altay
- 1997: Mersin İdman Yurdu
- 1998: Karşıyaka
- 1999–2000: Altay (youth)
- 2000: Altay
- 2000–2003: Altay (youth)
- 2003–2004: Pazarspor
- 2004–2005: Denizli BB
- 2005–2006: Altınordu
- 2006–2007: Altay (youth)
- 2007–2009: Bucaspor (youth)
- 2009–2010: Altay (youth)
- 2010: Altay
- 2015–2016: Altınordu (youth)
- * Club domestic league appearances and goals

Zafer Bilgetay (born 15 October 1956) is a retired Turkish football defender and later manager. He was capped five times for Turkey.
