= Ahmet Akçan =

Turkish football coach (born 1958)

Personal information
- Date of birth: 17 February 1958 (age 68)

Managerial career
- Years: Team
- Karabükspor
- Bursaspor
- Mardinspor
- Eskişehirspor

Ahmet Akçan (born 17 February 1958) is a Turkish football coach.

He worked as the assistant of Karl-Heinz Feldkamp when Feldkamp managed Galatasaray SK and Beşiktaş JK. He managed Karabükspor, Bursaspor, Mardinspor and Eskişehirspor.
