= Ekrem Al =

Turkish footballer

Personal information
- Date of birth: 1 January 1955 (age 71)
- Place of birth: Trabzon, Turkey

Managerial career
- Years: Team
- 1993–1994: Trabzon Yalıspor
- 1994–1995: Ofspor
- 1995–1996: Giresunspor
- 1996–1998: Gümüşhane Doğanspor
- 1998–1999: Bulancakspor
- 1999–2001: Akçaabat Sebatspor
- 2001: Siirt Jetpaspor
- 2001–2002: Erzurumspor
- 2002–2003: İstanbul Büyükşehir Belediyespor
- 2003: Akçaabat Sebatspor
- 2003–2004: Göztepe
- 2004–2005: Yimpaş Yozgatspor
- 2005–2006: Elazığspor
- 2006: Akçaabat Sebatspor
- 2006–2007: Altay
- 2007–2008: Mardinspor
- 2009: Adanaspor
- 2009: Orduspor
- 2010–2011: Şanlıurfaspor
- 2011: Akçaabat Sebatspor
- 2011–2012: Altay
- 2013: Adanaspor
- 2014: 1461 Trabzon
- 2016: Düzcespor
- 2016: Eyüpspor
- 2016–2017: Kırklarelispor
- 2017–2018: Eyüpspor
- 2018–2019: Eyüpspor
- 2019–2020: Sarıyer
- 2020: Kastamonuspor 1966

Ekrem Al (born 1 January 1955) is a Turkish football manager.
