= Özcan Kızıltan =

Turkish footballer

Personal information
- Date of birth: 12 July 1959 (age 67)
- Place of birth: Istanbul, Turkey
- Position: Midfielder

Senior career*
Years	Team	Apps	(Gls)
1980–1981	Mersin İdmanyurdu		
1981–1984	Fenerbahçe		
1984–1988	Sakaryaspor		
1988–1993	Mersin İdmanyurdu		

Managerial career
- 1993–1994: Mersin İdmanyurdu (assistant)
- 2000–2003: Fenerbahçe (youth)
- 2003: Fenerbahçe (assistant)
- 2003–2004: Fenerbahçe (youth)
- 2004: Gençlerbirliği (assistant)
- 2005: Çaykur Rizespor (assistant)
- 2005–2006: Turgutluspor
- 2006–2007: Tarsus Idman Yurdu
- 2007–2008: Bucaspor
- 2009: Balıkesirspor
- 2009: Sakaryaspor
- 2009–2010: Bucaspor
- 2010–2011: Göztepe
- 2012: Boluspor
- 2012–2013: Kartalspor
- 2013: Yeni Malatyaspor
- 2015: Eskişehirspor (assistant)
- 2016: Turgutluspor
- 2016–2017: Sakaryaspor (director of sports)
- 2017–2019: Tarsus Idman Yurdu
- 2019: Bayburt Özel İdarespor
- 2019: Nevşehir Belediyespor
- 2020–2021: 24 Erzincanspor
- 2021: Amed
- 2021: Ankaraspor
- 2022: Serik Belediyespor
- 2022: Sarıyer
- 2023: Eskişehirspor
- 2023–2024: Yeni Mersin İ.Y.
- 2024: Çorluspor 1947
- * Club domestic league appearances and goals

Özcan Kızıltan (born 12 July 1959) is a Turkish football coach and former player.
