= Orduspor =

Association football club in Turkey

Orduspor Kulübü
- Full name: Orduspor Kulübü Derneği
- Founded: 19 September 1967; 58 years ago
- Ground: 19 Eylül Stadium, Ordu
- Capacity: 11,024
- League: Ordu First Amateur League
- 2023–24: Ordu Second Amateur League
- Website: www.orduspor.org.tr
Home colours	Away colours	Third colours

Orduspor is a Turkish football club founded in 1967. The club is located in Ordu, Turkey and played their home games at 19 Eylül Stadium. The team managed to qualify for the Turkish Super League in 2011, getting relegated only two years later from the top level in 2013.

== History ==
In the second half of the 1967s, Ordu was a city where ladies in the stands enjoyed watching football matches with the most enthusiastic cheers and applause although football was not yet known in many cities of Anatolia. By that time there were two football teams in the fields of Ordu, named Karadeniz İdman Yurdu and Gençleryurdu. The players would get into the Ordu Mixed squad. Ali Ataoğlu (Kara Ali), who played for İstanbulspor and Anadoluhisarı, after returning to Ordu established the team "Spor Yıldızı" where he also played for a short while.

Ordu Mixed squad, composed of capable football players of these three teams, including Kara Ali, participated in the 1966 Turkish Junior Championship which was held in Mersin. The good play of the team and the second prize won in the competition made Mr. Orhan Şeref Apak, then-current president of the Turkish Football Federation, excited. As such, Apak stated to Kara Ali, the star of Ordu Mixed squad, that he wished to see Orduspor in the Turkish Second League and instructed for necessary action to be taken. Following the formal procedures, serious troubles were experienced within the establishment period. Especially financial shortages. Very few people know that Mr. Ali Ataoğlu who was also serving as the physical training regional manager, received loan from the bank in his name for the purpose of using for Orduspor. Club managers of Ordugücü, Karadeniz İdman Yurdu, Yolaçspor, 19 Eylül and Ocakspor gathered at the Public Training Center and decided to unite and reorganize into one club and thus the foundations of Orduspor were laid. After long discussions on colors and logo, purple and white were chosen as the club colors and nut was chosen as the emblem of Orduspor. The color purple symbolizes passion and white represents honor. On 8 March 1967 the temporary board of directors, registrars and auditors of Orduspor met at Çarşamba Karlıbel Office building and made the appointments. Instead of Ali Ataoğlu who could not hold the office of president due to being a public servant, İbrahim Köksal was elected as the first president of Ordu Sports Club. The first board of directors was composed of the following members: Nedim Aktürk (vice president), Kemal Ergöknil (general captain), Nihat Özel (secretary, Faik İbrişim (accountant), Hasan Akınoğlu (treasurer), Rıza Şimşek, Halit Gürsoy, Muzaffer Altınel, Abbas Furtun ve Hamdi Özel (members). This management team launched the great football adventure of Orduspor. 8 April 1967 Saturday, the joy of the people was unbounded. The ministers, senators, members of parliament sharing this joy, in a convoy of nearly 100 vehicles passed through Ünye, Fatsa and Perşembe districts and entered the city under intense enthusiasm of the people and welcomed with flowers and cheers. All avenues of the town were decorated in purple-and-white colors. As the convoy reached the 19 Eylül Stadium, Kamil Ocak, the Minister of State, Rafe Sezgin, the Minister of Energy and Natural Resources, Orhan Şeref Apak the president of Football Federation were hoisted on shoulders. After the speeches of Ordu Governor Mustafa Karaer, and the ministers it was formally declared that Orduspor was allowed to compete in the Turkish Second League.

A few months later the 1967–68 football season would start. The squad was mostly academy players. No transfers were made. After several interviews, İsfendiyar Açıkgöz, one of the legends of Galatasaray and the Turkish football was appointed as the technical manager of the team. Although he was 38 years of age, he sometimes wore the purple-white jersey of Orduspor during the first professional season of the team. Orduspor had the following players in the first eleven in their first preparation game: Hüsnü, Nevzat, Ahmet, Teoman, İhsan, Erol, İsmail, Üstün, B.Orhan, Yener, Aydın. Orduspor won 4–0 in the first match played before five thousand spectators. The first official league match was a 2–2 draw against the İzmir Ülküspor. Orduspor ended the 1974–75 football season as champions and went on to success in the Turkish First Division where they had been promoted. After four seasons, Orduspor moved up to fourth in the Turkish first division and qualified for UEFA Cup.

In the first match of the UEFA Cup, Orduspor won against the Czechoslovak team Baník Ostrava and managed to catch the attention of the European press. Unfortunately they lost in the away match and eliminated from the Cup. After one season Orduspor was relegated to Second division. However, Orduspor fans' eager for the First Division did not last long and after 2 seasons the team was promoted again to First division. After 3 seasons it was again relegated to Second division. In 1996–97 and 2000–01 Orduspor played old Third division and in 2001–02 season they competed in the new Third division. Since the 2005–06 season, it is competing in the “Bank Asya 1. Lig”, having its eye on the Turkish Super League.

== Stadium ==
19 Eylül Stadium receives its name from the visit of Mustafa Kemal Atatürk, the founder of the Republic of Turkey, to Ordu on 19 September. The stadium was built in our province by the General Directorate of Youth and Sports in accordance with the decree of the council of ministers for installing stadiums in several cities. The stadium is located at the center of the city and accommodates spectators by open and grand stands. North and South Goal Stands were built subsequently and the capacity of the stadium was expanded to 15.000 spectators. Currently, after the arrangements and mounting and lay out of seats, the stadium can accommodate 12,000 spectators. It is the home stadium of Orduspor. It features one protocol stand, two VIP stands, two grandstands, one disabled stand, visitors stand with a capacity of 760 spectators, two goal stands and a bleacher together with modern and compliant with TFF regulations and criteria two fully equipped medical services room, press room, study center, meeting room, and rooms designed to meet all requirements of home and visitor teams, representatives and referees. Rectangular shaped natural turf playing field is of size 68 meters x 105 meters. It is one of the best playing fields among the pitches of Bank Asya 1st League squads with its well-maintained turf and smooth and level soil surface. 19 Eylül Stadium is leased by Ordu Sports Club for a period of 10 years. With the efforts of the Ordu Sports Club, perimeter advertising boards were installed which make a substantial contribution in increasing advertising revenues from our sponsors. With respect to the resolution taken for illuminating the stadium, studies have been commenced and the stadium will be upgraded to host night matches for the 2010–2011 season.

== Club colors ==
Ordu SK's classic home kit

Orduspor are play in the colors of Purple and White. These colors were chosen to represent the purple violets the region is famous for and is the reason the club's nickname is Mor Menekşe (purple violets).

== Participations ==
=== League ===
- Süper Lig: 1975–81, 1983–86, 2011–13
- TFF First League: 1967–75, 1981–83, 1986–96, 1997–00, 2005–11, 2013–15
- TFF Second League: 2002–05, 2015–16
- TFF Third League: 1996–97, 2000–02, 2016–17
- Turkish Regional Amateur League: 2017–18
- Amateur League 1: 2018–

=== Europe ===
As of 3 October 1979

Competition	Pld	W	D	L	GF	GA	GD
UEFA Cup	2	1	0	1	2	6	–4

UEFA Cup:

Season	Round	Club	Home	Away	Aggregate
1979–80	1R	(Czechoslovakia) Baník Ostrava	2–0	0–6	2–6

UEFA Ranking history:

As of 1984

Season	Rank	Points	Ref.
1980	155 ▲	1.000	
1981	153 ▲	1.000	
1982	149 ▲	1.000	
1983	151 ▼	1.000	
1984	146 ▲	1.000	

== Managers ==
- (Turkey) İsfendiyar Açıkgöz (1967–68)
- (Turkey) Lefter Küçükandonyadis (1972–73)
- (Turkey) Kadri Aytaç (1974–75)
- (Turkey) Bülent Eken (1975–76)
- (Turkey) Fevzi Zemzem (1978–81)
- (Turkey) Candan Dumanlı (1981–82)
- (Turkey) Necip Cemal Gökalp (1982–83)
- (Turkey) Enver Katip (1994–95)
- (Turkey) Necip Cemal Gökalp (1996–97)
- (Turkey) Hıdır Akbaş (2004)
- (Turkey) Yücel İldiz (Oct 2005 – June 2007
- (Turkey) Suat Kaya (2007)
- (Turkey) İsmail Kartal (Jan 2008 – June 2008)
- (Turkey) Yücel İldiz (Oct 2008 – July 2009)
- (Turkey) Osman Özdemir (July 2009 – Oct 2009)
- (Turkey) Ekrem Al (Oct 2009 – June 2010)
- (Turkey) Ahmet Akçan (Jan 2010 – May 2010)
- (Turkey) Uğur Tütüneker (Aug 2010 – March 2011)
- (Turkey) Metin Diyadin (March 2011 – Dec 2011)
- (Turkey) Sebahattin Albayrak (interim) (Dec 2011)
- (Argentina) Héctor Cúper (Dec 2011 – April 2013)
- (Turkey) Cevat Güler (April 2013–)

== Other departments ==
Orduspor has also a woman basketball team since 2011 and promoted to Turkish Women's Basketball League in 2012–13 season.
