= List of football clubs by competitive honours won =

This article lists men's association football clubs who have won 50 or more total competitive honours run by official governing bodies as well as women's clubs who have won 30 or more of such competitive honours. Friendly and invitational competitions and matches organized between clubs are not included.

== Summary totals ==
Trophies that were shared between two clubs are counted as honours for both teams. Clubs tied in total honours are listed chronologically by most recent honour won.

=== Definitions ===
For the purposes of this article:

- Intercontinental competitions are competitions organized between two or more confederations or by FIFA. Competitions organized between two or more national federations on different continents such as the Copa Iberoamericana are not included, nor are competitions that are only available to teams from part of each continent such as the Arab Club Champions Cup.
- Continental competitions are continent-wide competitions organized by a confederation. Competitions organized between two or more national federations such as the Anglo-Italian Cup or Balkans Cup are not included, nor are competitions organized by a confederation that only include teams from one region of a continent such as the CONCACAF Caribbean Cup or Copa Merconorte.
- Domestic competitions are top-level nationwide competitions organized by a single national federation. Competitions contested within a sub-national level such as a city or statewide tournament are not included.

=== List ===
Key:

World record
Continental record
National record

==== Men's ====
As of 16 August 2026

		Intercontinental (Note: For the purposes of this article, "intercontinental competitions" are competitions organized between two or more confederations or by FIFA. Competitions organized between two national federations on different continents such as the Copa Iberoamericana are not included, nor are competitions that are only available to teams from part of each continent such as the Arab Club Champions Cup.)				Continental (Note: For the purposes of this article, "continental competitions" are continent-wide competitions organized by a confederation. Competitions organized between two or more national federations such as the Anglo-Italian Cup or Balkans Cup are not included, nor are competitions organized by a confederation that only include teams one region of a continent such as the CONCACAF Caribbean Cup or Copa Merconorte.)			Domestic (Note: For the purposes of this article, "domestic competitions" are top-level nationwide competitions organized by a single national federation. Competitions contested within a sub-national level such as a city or statewide tournament are not included.)				Total
Club	Confederation	FCWC	FIC	Other	Total	Main Cup (Note: AFC Champions League Elite, CAF Champions League, CONCACAF Champions Cup, Copa Libertadores, OFC Professional League (or the OFC Men's Champions League prior to 2026), UEFA Champions League, or the former Campeonato Centroamericano)	Other	Total	League (Note: Top-flight league titles only)	Main Cup	Other	Total	Total
(Egypt) (Note: United Arab Republic 1958–1961) Al Ahly	CAF	–	–	2 (Note: 1 FIFA African–Asian–Pacific Cup, 1 Afro-Asian Cup)	2	12	13 (Note: 4 African Cup Winners' Cups, 1 CAF Confederation Cup, 8 CAF Super Cups)	25	43 (Note: Not including two Egyptian league titles during the time when Egypt was part of the United Arab Republic.)	39 (Note: 38 Egypt Cups, 1 United Arab Republic Cup. Not including their 1960–61 Egypt Cup as this competition was not a United Arab Republic-wide competition.)	16 (Note: 16 Egyptian Super Cups)	98	125
(Scotland) Celtic	UEFA	–	–	–	–	1	–	1	56	43	22 (Note: 22 Scottish League Cups)	121	122
(Northern Ireland) (Note: All-Ireland until 1921.) Linfield	UEFA	–	–	–	–	–	–	–	57	44	17 (Note: 4 NIFL Charity Shields, 13 NIFL Cups)	118	118
(Scotland) Rangers	UEFA	–	–	–	–	–	1 (Note: 1 UEFA Cup Winners' Cup)	1	55	34	28 (Note: 28 Scottish League Cups)	117	118
(Uruguay) Nacional	CONMEBOL	–	–	5 (Note: 3 Intercontinental Cups, 2 Copa Interamericana)	5	3	1 (Note: 1 Recopa Sudamericana)	4	50	–	53 (Note: 15 Torneo de Honor, 10 Torneo Competencia, 12 Torneo Apertura, 8 Torneo Clausura, 5 Torneo Intermedio, 3 Supercopa Uruguaya)	103	112
(Uruguay) Peñarol	CONMEBOL	–	–	4 (Note: 3 Intercontinental Cups, 1 Recopa Intercontinental)	4	5	–	5	52	1	46 (Note: 11 Torneo de Honor, 11 Torneo Competencia, 7 Torneo Apertura, 11 Torneo Clausura, 2 Torneo Clasificatorio, 3 Supercopa Uruguaya, 1 Torneo Intermedio)	99	108
(Spain) Real Madrid	UEFA	5	1	3 (Note: 3 Intercontinental Cups)	9	15	8 (Note: 2 UEFA Europa Leagues, 6 UEFA Super Cups)	23	36	20	15 (Note: 1 Copa de la Liga, 13 Supercopa de España, 1 Copa Eva Duarte)	71	103
(Spain) Barcelona	UEFA	3	–	–	3	5	12 (Note: 4 UEFA Cup Winners' Cups, 5 UEFA Super Cups, 3 Inter-Cities Fairs Cups)	17	29	32	21 (Note: 2 Copa de la Liga, 16 Supercopa de España, 3 Copa Eva Duarte)	82	102
(Hong Kong) South China	AFC	–	–	–	–	–	–	–	41	10	44 (Note: 31 Hong Kong Senior Shields, 8 Hong Kong Viceroy Cups, 3 Hong Kong League Cups, 2 Hong Kong Community Cups)	95	95
(Portugal) Porto	UEFA	–	–	2 (Note: 2 Intercontinental Cups)	2	2	3 (Note: 2 UEFA Europa League, 1 UEFA Super Cup)	5	31	20	30 (Note: 4 Campeonato de Portugal, 1 Taça da Liga, 25 Supertaça Cândido de Oliveira)	81	88
(Germany) Bayern Munich	UEFA	2	–	2 (Note: 2 Intercontinental Cups)	4	6	4 (Note: 1 UEFA Cup Winners' Cup, 1 UEFA Europa League, 2 UEFA Super Cups)	10	35	21	18 (Note: 6 DFL-Ligapokal, 12 DFL-Supercup)	74	88
(Portugal) Benfica	UEFA	–	–	–	–	2	–	2	38	26	20 (Note: 3 Campeonato de Portugal, 8 Taça da Liga, 9 Supertaça Cândido de Oliveira)	84	86
(Bahrain) Al-Muharraq	AFC	–	–	–	–	–	2 (Note: 2 AFC Cups)	2	36	34	14 (Note: 4 Bahraini Super Cups, 5 Bahraini FA Cups)	84	86
(Jordan) Al-Faisaly	AFC	–	–	–	–	–	2 (Note: 2 AFC Cup)	2	35	21	27 (Note: 9 Jordan FA Shields, 17 Jordan Super Cups)	83	85
(Greece) Olympiacos	UEFA	–	–	–	–	–	1 (Note: 1 UEFA Europa Conference League)	1	48	29	5 (Note: 5 Greek Super Cups)	82	83
(Gibraltar) Lincoln Red Imps	UEFA	–	–	–	–	–	–	–	30	21	31 (Note: 18 Gibraltar Premier Cups, 13 Pepe Reyes Cups)	82	82
(Republic of Ireland) Shamrock Rovers	UEFA	–	–	–	–	–	–	–	23	26	27 (Note: 18 League of Ireland Shields, 2 League of Ireland Cups, 2 President of Ireland's Cups, 1 FAI Super Cup)	76	76
(Netherlands) Ajax	UEFA	–	–	2 (Note: 2 Intercontinental Cups)	2	4	4 (Note: 1 UEFA Cup Winners' Cup, 1 UEFA Europa League, 2 UEFA Super Cups)	8	36	21	9 (Note: 9 Johan Cruyff Shields)	66	76
(Italy) Juventus	UEFA	–	–	2 (Note: 2 Intercontinental Cups)	2	2	7 (Note: 1 UEFA Cup Winners' Cup, 3 UEFA Europa League, 2 UEFA Super Cups, 1 UEFA Intertoto Cup)	9	36 (Note: Not including two stripped titles)	15	9 (Note: 9 Supercoppa Italiana)	60	71
(Serbia) (Note: Yugoslavia before 1992, Serbia and Montenegro between 1992 and 2006.) Red Star Belgrade	UEFA	–	–	1 (Note: 1 Intercontinental Cup)	1	1	–	1	36 (Note: 19 Yugoslav First League, 5 First League of Serbia and Montenegro, 12 Serbian SuperLiga. Not including one Serbian league title during the time when Serbia was part of Yugoslavia.)	30 (Note: 12 Yugoslav Cups, 9 Serbia and Montenegro Cups, 9 Serbian Cups)	3 (Note: 2 Yugoslav Super Cups, 1 Yugoslav League Cup)	69	71
(Ivory Coast) ASEC Mimosas	CAF	–	–	–	–	1	1 (Note: 1 CAF Super Cup)	2	30	22	17 (Note: 17 Coupe Houphouët-Boigny)	69	71
(Croatia) (Note: Yugoslavia until 1992.) Dinamo Zagreb	UEFA	–	–	–	–	–	1 (Note: 1 Inter-Cities Fairs Cup)	1	36 (Note: 1 Croatian First League, 9 Yugoslav First League, 26 Prva HNL)	26 (Note: 18 Croatian Cups, 8 Yugoslav Cups)	8 (Note: 8 Croatian Super Cups)	70	71
(England) Liverpool	UEFA	1	–	–	1	6	7 (Note: 3 UEFA Europa Leagues, 4 UEFA Super Cups)	13	20 (Note: 18 Football League First Division, 2 Premier Leagues)	8	27 (Note: 10 EFL Cups, 16 FA Community Shields, 1 Football League Super Cup)	55	69
(Turkey) Galatasaray	UEFA	–	–	–	–	–	2 (Note: 1 UEFA Europa League, 1 UEFA Super Cup)	2	26	19	22 (Note: 17 Turkish Super Cups, 5 Prime Minister's Cups)	67	69
(Hungary) Ferencváros	UEFA	–	–	–	–	–	1 (Note: 1 Inter-Cities Fairs Cup)	1	36	24	8 (Note: 2 Ligakupas, 6 Szuperkupas)	68	69
(Argentina) River Plate	CONMEBOL	–	–	2 (Note: 1 Intercontinental Cup, 1 Copa Interamericana)	2	4	13	17	38	3	12	47	69
(Israel) (Note: Mandatory Palestine until 1948) Maccabi Tel Aviv	UEFA (Note: The Israel Football Association has been part of UEFA since 1991. Previously it was part of the Asian Football Confederation from 1954 until their expulsion from the confederation in 1974 and the Oceania Football Confederation between 1985 and 1989.)	–	–	–	–	2 (Note: 2 Asian Champion Club Tournaments; the club and the Israeli federation were part of the Asian Football Confederation until 1974. One of these titles was won by forfeit, as their opponent, Aliyat Al-Shorta of Iraq, boycotted the match against the Israeli side in the final.)	–	2	25 (Note: 5 Palestine Leagues, 19 Israeli Premier Leagues. Not including their 1939 Palestine League title, which, while recognized by the Israel Football Association, was not a nationwide competition.)	25 (Note: 6 Palestine Cups, 18 Israeli State Cups)	16 (Note: 8 Toto Cups, 8 Israeli Supercups)	66	68
(England) Manchester United	UEFA	1	–	1 (Note: 1 Intercontinental Cup)	2	3	3 (Note: 1 UEFA Cup Winners' Cup, 1 UEFA Europa League, 1 UEFA Super Cup)	6	20 (Note: 7 Football League First Division, 13 Premier Leagues)	13	27 (Note: 6 EFL Cups, 21 FA Community Shields)	60	68
(Ukraine) (Note: Soviet Union until 1991.) Dynamo Kyiv	UEFA	–	–	–	–	–	3 (Note: 2 UEFA Cup Winners' Cups, 1 UEFA Super Cup)	3	30 (Note: 13 Soviet Top League, 17 Ukrainian Premier League)	22 (Note: 9 Soviet Cups, 13 Ukrainian Cups)	12 (Note: 3 Soviet Super Cups, 9 Ukrainian Super Cups)	64	67
Al-Kuwait	AFC	–	–	–	–	–	4 (Note: 3 AFC Cups, 1 AFC Challenge League)	4	21	17	23 (Note: 5 Kuwait Federation Cups, 8 Kuwait Super Cup, 10 Kuwait Crown Prince Cup)	61	65
(Belgium) Anderlecht	UEFA	–	–	–	–	–	5 (Note: 2 UEFA Cup Winners' Cups, 2 UEFA Super Cups, 1 UEFA Europa League)	5	34	9	16 (Note: 3 Belgian League Cups, 13 Belgian Super Cups)	59	64
(Cyprus) APOEL	UEFA	–	–	–	–	–	–	–	29	21	14 (Note: 14 Cypriot Super Cups)	64	64
(Bulgaria) CSKA Sofia	UEFA	–	–	–	–	–	–	–	31	22	10 (Note: 4 Cup of the Soviet Army, 5 Bulgarian Supercups, 1 Bulgarian Cup – (secondary cup competition))	63	63
(Tunisia) Espérance Tunis	CAF	–	–	1 (Note: 1 Afro-Asian Club Championship)	1	4	3 (Note: 1 African Cup Winners' Cup, 1 CAF Cup, 1 CAF Super Cup)	7	34	15	6 (Note: 6 Tunisian Super Cups)	55	63
(Romania) FCSB (Note: Subject to legal challenge: see Steaua București football records dispute)	UEFA	–	–	–	–	1	1 (Note: 1 UEFA Super Cup)	2	28	24	9 (Note: 2 Cupa Ligii, 7 Supercupa României)	61	63
(Argentina) Boca Juniors	CONMEBOL	–	–	3 (Note: 3 Intercontinental Cups)	3	6	9 (Note: 2 Copa Sudamericana, 1 Supercopa Libertadores, 4 Recopa Sudamericana, 1 Copa de Oro, 1 Copa Master de Supercopa)	15	36	4	4 (Note: 2 Copa de la Liga Profesional, 2 Supercopa Argentina)	43	62
(Saint Pierre and Miquelon) Îlienne Amateur	(Note: Saint Pierre and Miquelon has applied to join CONCACAF but has not yet been admitted to the confederation. Football in Saint Pierre and Miquelon is run as an affiliate of the French Football Federation.)	–	–	–	–	–	–	–	28	26	8 (Note: 8 Coupe du Territoire)	62	62
(Chile) Colo-Colo	CONMEBOL	–	–	1 (Note: 1 Copa Interamericana)	1	1	1 (Note: 1 Recopa Sudamericana)	2	34	14	8 (Note: 4 Supercopa de Chile, 3 Campeonato de Apertura, 1 Campeonato Nacional de Football)	56	61
(Egypt) Zamalek	CAF	–	–	2 (Note: 2 Afro-Asian Cups)	2	5	8 (Note: 1 African Cup Winners' Cup, 2 CAF Confederation Cups, 5 CAF Super Cups)	13	14 (Note: Not including one Egyptian league title from when Egypt was part of the United Arab Republic.)	27 (Note: Not including two Egypt Cups won during the time when Egypt was part of the United Arab Republic.)	4 (Note: 4 Egyptian Super Cups)	45	60
(Faroe Islands) Havnar Bóltfelag	UEFA	–	–	–	–	–	–	–	24	30	6 (Note: 6 Faroe Islands Super Cups)	60	60
(Bulgaria) Levski Sofia	UEFA	–	–	–	–	–	–	–	27	26	6 (Note: 3 Cup of the Soviet Army, 3 Bulgarian Supercups, 1 Bulgarian Cup – (secondary cup competition))	60	60
(France) Paris Saint-Germain	UEFA	–	1	–	1	2	4 (Note: 1 UEFA Cup Winners' Cup, 1 UEFA Intertoto Cup, 2 UEFA Super Cup)	6	14	16	23 (Note: 9 Coupe de la Ligue, 14 Trophée des Champions)	53	60
(Malaysia) Selangor	AFC	–	–	–	–	–	–	–	6	32 (Note: 27 pre-1990 Malaysia Cups, 5 Malaysia FA Cups; the Malaysia Cup was considered the most prestigious knockout tournament in the country prior to 1990.)	21 (Note: 6 post-1990 Malaysia Cups, 7 Malaysia FAM Cups, 8 Malaysia Charity Shields)	59	59
(Slovakia) (Note: Czechoslovakia until 1992.) Slovan Bratislava	UEFA	–	–	–	–	–	1 (Note: 1 UEFA Cup Winners' Cup)	1	32 (Note: 4 Slovak Football Association Championship, 8 Czechoslovak First League, 20 Slovak First Football League)	22 (Note: 17 Slovak Cups, 5 Czechoslovak Cups)	4 (Note: 4 Slovak Super Cups)	58	59
(Saudi Arabia) Al Hilal	AFC	–	–	–	–	4	4 (Note: 2 Asian Cup Winners' Cups, 2 Asian Super Cups)	8	19	12	19 (Note: 13 Saudi Crown Prince Cups, 5 Saudi Super Cups, 1 Saudi Founder's Cup)	50	58
(Paraguay) Olimpia	CONMEBOL	–	–	2 (Note: 1 Intercontinental Cup, 1 Copa Interamericana)	2	3	3 (Note: 2 Recopa Sudamericana, 1 Supercopa Sudamericana)	6	48	1	1 (Note: 1 Supercopa Paraguay)	50	58
(Qatar) Al Sadd	AFC	–	–	–	–	2	–	2	19	19	17 (Note: 15 Sheikh Jassim Cups, 2 Qatari Stars Cups)	55	57
(Costa Rica) Saprissa	CONCACAF (Note: Members of CCCF until 1961.)	–	–	–	–	3	1 (Note: 1 CONCACAF League)	4	40	8	5 (Note: 3 Supercopa de Costa Rica, 2 Recopa de Costa Rica)	53	57
(Mali) Stade Malien	CAF	–	–	–	–	–	1 (Note: 1 CAF Confederation Cup)	1	23	23	10 (Note: 10 Super Coupe National du Mali)	56	57
(Portugal) Sporting CP	UEFA	–	–	–	–	–	1 (Note: 1 UEFA Cup Winners' Cup)	1	21	18	17 (Note: 4 Campeonato de Portugal, 4 Taça da Liga, 9 Supertaça Cândido de Oliveira)	56	57
(Kuwait) Al-Qadsia	AFC	–	–	–	–	–	1 (Note: 1 AFC Cup)	1	17	17	22 (Note: 6 Kuwait Federation Cups, 7 Kuwait Super Cup, 9 Kuwait Crown Prince Cup)	56	57
(Ethiopia) Saint George	CAF	–	–	–	–	–	–	–	31	10	16 (Note: 16 Ethiopian Super Cups)	57	57
(Note: Also competed in German tournaments between 1938 and 1944.) Austria Wien	UEFA	–	–	–	–	–	–	–	24	27	6 (Note: 6 Austrian Supercups)	57	57
(Czech Republic) Sparta Prague	UEFA	–	–	–	–	–	–	–	38 (Note: 3 Bohemian Football Union Championship, 21 Czechoslovak First League, 14 Czech First League)	16 (Note: 8 Czech Cups, 8 Czechoslovak Cups)	2 (Note: 2 Czech Supercups)	56	56
(Cyprus) Omonia	UEFA	–	–	–	–	–	–	–	22	16	17 (Note: 17 Cypriot Super Cup)	55	55
(Jordan) Al-Wehdat	AFC	–	–	–	–	–	–	–	17	13	25 (Note: 10 Jordan Shield Cups, 15 Jordan Super Cups)	55	55
(Netherlands) PSV Eindhoven	UEFA	–	–	–	–	1	1 (Note: 1 UEFA Europa League)	2	27	11	15 (Note: 15 Johan Cruyff Shields)	53	55
(Honduras) Olimpia	CONCACAF	–	–	–	–	3 (Note: 2 CONCACAF Champions Cups, 1 Campeonato Centroamericano from when Central America had its own confederation (the CCCF))	2 (Note: 2 CONCACAF Leagues)	5	47 (Note: 7 Honduran Amateur Leagues, 40 Liga Nacional de Fútbol Profesional de Honduras)	3	–	50	55
(South Africa) Kaizer Chiefs	CAF	–	–	–	–	–	1 (Note: 1 African Cup Winners' Cup)	1	12	14	28 (Note: 13 Knockout Cups, 15 MTN 8s)	54	55
(Iceland) KR Reykjavik	UEFA	–	–	–	–	–	–	–	27	14	14 (Note: 8 Icelandic Men's Football League Cups, 6 Icelandic Men's Football Super Cups)	55	55
(Northern Ireland) Glentoran	UEFA	–	–	–	–	–	–	–	23	23	9 (Note: 2 NIFL Charity Shields, 7 NIFL Cups)	55	55
(Fiji) Ba	OFC	–	–	–	–	–	–	–	21	14 (Note: 6 Inter-District Championships, 8 Fiji Football Association Cup Tournaments; the IDC is no longer considered a major honor according to above stipulations but was Fiji's main cup competition prior to 1975. Ba have won 25 total IDC titles as of 2026 but only 6 came prior to 1975.)	20 (Note: 20 Champion versus Champion Cups)	55	55
(Liechtenstein) (Note: Although they are based in Liechtenstein and compete in the Liechtensteiner Cup, Vaduz (and all other clubs based in Liechtenstein) compete in the Swiss league system because Liechtenstein no longer has its own national league.) Vaduz	UEFA	–	–	–	–	–	–	–	2 (Note: 2 Liechtenstein Football Championships. Teams from Liechtenstein compete in the Swiss football league system since 1944.)	52	–	54	54
(Ivory Coast) Africa Sports d'Abidjan	CAF	–	–	–	–	–	3 (Note: 2 African Cup Winners' Cups, 1 CAF Super Cup)	3	18	21	12 (Note: 12 Coupe Houphouët-Boigny)	51	54
(Finland) HJK Helsinki	UEFA	–	–	–	–	–	–	–	33	15	6 (Note: 6 Finnish League Cups)	54	54
(Albania) Tirana	UEFA	–	–	–	–	–	–	–	26 (Note: Not including two titles which are unrecognized by the Albanian Football Federation)	16	12 (Note: 12 Albanian Supercups)	54	54
(Kuwait) Al-Arabi	AFC	–	–	–	–	–	–	–	17	16	21 (Note: 8 Kuwait Federation Cups, 3 Kuwait Super Cup, 10 Kuwait Crown Prince Cup)	54	54
(Martinique) Franciscain	CONCACAF (Note: Martinique is not a FIFA member but is a full member of CONCACAF.)	–	–	–	–	–	–	–	20	20	13 (Note: 13 Trophée du Conseil Général)	53	53
(Guatemala) Comunicaciones	CONCACAF	–	–	–	–	1	1 (Note: 1 CONCACAF League)	2	32	8	10 (Note: 10 Copa Campeón de Campeones de Guatemala)	50	52
(Malta) Valletta	UEFA	–	–	–	–	–	–	–	25	14	13 (Note: 13 Maltese Super Cups)	52	52
(England) Arsenal	UEFA	–	–	–	–	–	2 (Note: 1 UEFA Cup Winners' Cup, 1 Inter-Cities Fairs Cup)	2	14	14	21 (Note: 2 EFL Cup, 18 FA Community Shield, 1 Football League Centenary Trophy)	49	51
(Belgium) Club Brugge	UEFA	–	–	–	–	–	–	–	20	12	19 (Note: 19 Belgian Supercups)	51	51
(Austria) Rapid Wien	UEFA	–	–	–	–	–	–	–	33 (Note: 32 Austrian Championships, 1 German Championship)	15 (Note: 14 Austrian Cups, 1 Tschammerpokal)	3 (Note: 3 Austrian Supercups)	51	51
(Malta) Sliema Wanderers	UEFA	–	–	–	–	–	–	–	26	22	3 (Note: 3 Maltese Super Cup)	51	51
(Mali) Djoliba	CAF	–	–	–	–	–	–	–	24	20	7 (Note: 7 Super Coupe National du Mali)	51	51
(Northern Cyprus) (Note: Cyprus until 1955.) Çetinkaya	ConIFA (Note: Northern Cyprus is not a member of FIFA nor any FIFA confederation, and is instead a member of the Confederation of Independent Football Associations. Çetinkaya T.S.K. competed in the Cyprus Football Association (which joined FIFA in 1948 and UEFA in 1962) until 1955.)	–	–	–	–	–	–	–	15 (Note: 14 CTFA Super League, 1 Cypriot First Division)	19 (Note: 17 Northern Cyprus Cups, 2 Cypriot Cups)	17 (Note: 5 Dr. Fazıl Küçük Kupası, 9 KTFF Super Cups, 3 Cypriot Super Cups)	51	51
(Malta) Floriana	UEFA	–	–	–	–	–	–	–	27	21	2 (Note: 2 Maltese Super Cups)	50	50
(Costa Rica) Alajuelense	CONCACAF	–	–	–	–	3 (Note: 2 CONCACAF Champions Cups, 1 Campeonato Centroamericano y Caribe from when Central America had its own confederation (the CCCF))	1 (Note: 1 CONCACAF League)	4	31	12	3 (Note: 1 Supercopa de Costa Rica, 2 Recopa de Costa Rica)	46	50
(Italy) Milan	UEFA	1	–	3 (Note: 3 Intercontinental Cups)	4	7	7 (Note: 2 UEFA Cup Winners' Cups, 5 UEFA Super Cups)	14	19	5	8 (Note: 8 Supercoppa Italiana)	32	50

==== Women's ====
As of 29 May 2026

		Intercontinental			Continental			Domestic				Total
Club	Confederation	FWCWC	FWCC	Total	Main Cup (Note: AFC Women's Champions League (or its predecessor AFC Women's Club Championship), CAF Women's Champions League, CONCACAF W Champions Cup, Copa Libertadores Femenina, OFC Women's Champions League, UEFA Women's Champions League)	Other	Total	League	Main Cup	Others	Total	Total
(England) Arsenal	UEFA	–	1	1	2	–	2	15	14	22 (Note: 7 FA Women's League Cups, 10 FA Women's National League Cups, 5 Women's FA Community Shields)	51	54
(Iceland) Breiðablik	UEFA	–	–	–	–	–	–	20	14	19 (Note: 9 Icelandic Women's Football League Cups, 10 Icelandic Women's Football Super Cups)	53	53
(Bosnia and Herzegovina) SFK 2000	UEFA	–	–	–	–	–	–	23	21	3 (Note: 3 Bosnia and Herzegovina Women's Supercups)	47	47
(Japan) Tokyo Verdy	AFC	–	–	–	1	–	1	18	16	10 (Note: 8 Nadeshiko League Cups, 2 Nadeshiko Super Cups)	44	45
(Croatia) Osijek	UEFA	–	–	–	–	–	–	25	19	–	44	44
(Finland) HJK	UEFA	–	–	–	–	–	–	25	18	–	43	43
(Iceland) Valur	UEFA	–	–	–	–	–	–	14	15	14 (Note: 5 Icelandic Women's Football League Cups, 9 Icelandic Women's Football Super Cups)	43	43
(France) Lyon	UEFA	–	–	–	8	–	8	19	11	4 (Note: 1 Coupe LFFP, 3 Trophée des Championnes)	34	42
(Faroe Islands) KÍ Klaksvík	UEFA	–	–	–	–	–	–	23	16	3 (Note: 3 Faroese Women's Super Cups)	42	42
(Czech Republic) Sparta Prague	UEFA	–	–	–	–	–	–	31 (Note: 9 Czechoslovak women's football championships, 21 Czech Women's First Leagues)	10	–	41	41
(Switzerland) Zürich	UEFA	–	–	–	–	–	–	24	16	–	40	40
(Serbia) Mašinac PZP	UEFA	–	–	–	–	–	–	24 (Note: 17 Yugoslav First Women's Leagues, 4 Serbia and Montenegro Women's Leagues, 3 Serbian Women's Super Leagues)	15 (Note: 10 Yugoslav Women's Cups, 1 Serbia and Montenegro Women's Cup, 4 Serbian Women's Cups)	–	39	39
(Cyprus) Apollon Ladies	UEFA	–	–	–	–	–	–	15	14	10 (Note: 10 Cypriot Women's Super Cups)	39	39
(Bulgaria) NSA Sofia	UEFA	–	–	–	–	–	–	19	19	–	38	38
(Lithuania) Gintra	UEFA	–	–	–	–	–	–	24	12	1 (Note: 1 Lithuanian Women's Supercup)	37	37
(Belgium) Standard Liège	UEFA	–	–	–	–	–	–	20	9	7 (Note: 7 Belgian Women's Supercups)	36	36
(Spain) Barcelona	UEFA	–	–	–	4	–	4	11	12	6 (Note: 6 Supercopa de España Femenina)	29	33
(Uzbekistan) Sevinch Qarshi	AFC	–	–	–	–	–	–	18	11	4 (Note: 4 Uzbek Super Cups)	33	33
(Scotland) Glasgow City	UEFA	–	–	–	–	–	–	16	9	7 (Note: 7 Scottish Women's Premier League Cups)	32	32
(Argentina) Boca Juniors	CONMEBOL	–	–	–	–	–	–	28	–	2 (Note: 1 Copa de la Liga Argentina, 1 Supercopa Argentina)	30	30
(Kazakhstan) BIIK Shymkent	UEFA (Note: Members of AFC until 2002.)	–	–	–	–	–	–	18	11	1 (Note: 1 Kazakh Super Cup)	30	30
(Ivory Coast) Juventus de Yopougon	CAF	–	–	–	–	–	–	16	7	7 (Note: 7 Côte d'Ivoire Women's Federation Cups)	30	30
(Cook Islands) Tupapa Maraerenga	OFC	–	–	–	–	–	–	15	15	–	30	30
(Malta) Birkirkara	UEFA	–	–	–	–	–	–	13	17	–	30	30
