= CCCF Youth Championship =

- Founded: 1954
- Abolished: 1960
- Region: Central America and Caribbean
- Most successful team(s): Costa Rica (2 titles)

The CCCF Youth Championship was an association football (soccer) tournament made for teams in the area of Central America and the Caribbean between the years of 1954 and 1960, under the auspices of the Confederación Centroamericana y del Caribe de Fútbol (CCCF).

The competition was replaced with CONCACAF Youth Championship following the CCCF merger with NAFC to form CONCACAF in 1961.

== Nations ==
- Curaçao
- Costa Rica
- El Salvador
- Guatemala
- Honduras
- Panama
- Nicaragua

== Tournament results ==
CCCF Youth Championship
Year	Host	Final Group Rank				
Year	Host	Winner	Runner-up	3rd Place	4th Place	5th Place
1954; Details	Costa Rica	Costa Rica	Panama	Curaçao	Guatemala	El Salvador
1956; Details	El Salvador	El Salvador	Curaçao	Costa Rica	Guatemala	Honduras
1958; Details	Guatemala	Guatemala	Honduras	Costa Rica	El Salvador	Nicaragua
1960; Details	Honduras	Costa Rica	Honduras	Panama	El Salvador	Guatemala

== Winners ==
Wins	Nation	Year(s)
2	Costa Rica	1954, 1960
1	El Salvador	1956
1	Guatemala	1958
