= Prime Minister's Cup =

Prime Minister's Cup may refer to:

- Prime Minister's Cup (Laos), a football competition in Laos
- Prime Minister's Cup (Turkey), a defunct football competition in Turkey
- Başbakanlık Kupası (Northern Cyprus), a tournament of the Cyprus Turkish Football Federation
- Prime Minister Cup (Go), a Go tournament in Japan
- Prime Minister's Cup (Sōridaijin-hai), a ceremonial cup given to the makuuchi champion in sumo
- Prime Minister's Cup (AFL), an individual match award in the Australian Football League
- Prime Minister's Cup, a trophy awarded to the winner of the Japan Professional Sports Grand Prize
- Prime Minister Cup, a cricket competition in Nepal

== See also ==
- Prime Minister's Trophy, awarded to the winner of the Bahamas Bowl in college football
- President's Cup (disambiguation)
- President's Trophy (disambiguation)
