= Mexican football clubs in international competitions =

This is a list of Mexican football clubs in international competitions. Throughout their history, Mexican clubs have participated in global, intercontinental, continental and regional competitions organized and/or recognized by FIFA, CONCACAF, CONMEBOL, CCCF or USSF–FMF.

== History ==
Since 1959, Mexican clubs have participated in official international competitions. The first appearance was in the 1959 Championship of Central America and Mexico organized by CCCF, direct predecessor confederation of CONCACAF. It was the first official international competition for clubs from North America, Central America and the Caribbean. Guadalajara participated as champions of the 1958–59 Mexican Primera División season.

The first continental club competition organized by CONCACAF was the 1962 CONCACAF Champions' Cup. Guadalajara participated as champions of the 1961–62 Mexican Primera División season. Mexican clubs have dominated the CONCACAF Champions Cup, with fourteen clubs finishing as champions and winning a total of 40 titles.

From 1998 to 2016, Mexican clubs also participated as invitees in CONMEBOL continental competitions, Copa Libertadores (1998–2016), Copa Sudamericana (2005–2008), Recopa Sudamericana (2007), and Copa Merconorte (2000 and 2001). The first appearance was in the 1998 Copa Libertadores with América and Guadalajara participating as the two clubs that qualified through the 1998-I Pre-Libertadores tournament.

In intercontinental competitions, Mexican clubs participated in the Copa Interamericana, jointly organized by CONCACAF and CONMEBOL, which was contested by the winners of the CONCACAF Champions Cup and Copa Libertadores. The first appearance was in the 1969 Copa Interamericana with Toluca participating as champions of the 1968 CONCACAF Champions' Cup. The first intercontinental club competition organized by FIFA was the 2024 FIFA Intercontinental Cup with the official secondary trophies contested as part of the competition (FIFA Derby of the Americas and FIFA Challenger Cup). Pachuca participated as champions of the 2024 CONCACAF Champions Cup.

The first global club competition organized by FIFA was the 2000 FIFA Club World Championship. Necaxa participated as champions of the 1999 CONCACAF Champions' Cup. The best performance was achieved by Tigres UANL, finishing as runners-up in 2020.

Since 2007, Mexican clubs have participated in regional club competitions jointly organized by MLS and Liga MX, and also officially recognized by USSF and FMF. Contested by clubs from the North American Zone (the United States, Canada and Mexico). The first appearance was in the 2007 North American SuperLiga.

== Qualification for CONCACAF competitions ==
For the CONCACAF Champions Cup, nine Mexican clubs are eligible to qualify for the competition, with six clubs guaranteed a spot based on their performance in Liga MX.

- Liga MX (6):
  - Champions and runners-up of the Apertura and Clausura tournaments.
  - Two highest-ranked clubs in the aggregate table points of the season, that have not already qualified.
- Leagues Cup (3):
  - Champions, runners-up, and third place.

If one or more Liga MX clubs were to qualify through multiple methods, then the next Liga MX club with the most aggregate table points would qualify in the remaining slot. If the Leagues Cup champion were to win the Apertura or Clausura, then both the Apertura and Clausura champions would qualify to the round of 16; should the Leagues Cup slot(s) have already qualified, then Liga MX would be awarded with one additional slot to be given to the next best non-qualified team in the aggregate table.

== International honours ==
=== Global/Intercontinental competitions ===
Global/Intercontinental (FIFA)
Club	Titles	Winning years	Runners-up
FIFA Club World Cup
Tigres UANL	0	—	2020
FIFA Intercontinental Cup
Pachuca	0	—	2024
FIFA Challenger Cup
Pachuca	1	2024	—
FIFA Derby of the Americas
Pachuca	1	2024	—
Cruz Azul	0	—	2025

Intercontinental (CONCACAF–CONMEBOL)
Club	Titles	Winning years	Runners-up
Copa Interamericana (defunct)
América	2	1978, 1991	—
Pumas UNAM	1	1981	1990
Toluca	0	—	1969
Cruz Azul	0	—	1972
Atlético Español	0	—	1976
Puebla	0	—	1992

=== Continental competitions ===
Continental (CONCACAF)
Club	Titles	Winning years	Runners-up
CONCACAF Champions Cup
Cruz Azul	7	1969, 1970, 1971, 1996, 1997, 2013–14, 2025	2008–09, 2009–10
América	7	1977, 1987, 1990, 1992, 2006, 2014–15, 2015–16	2021
Pachuca	6	2002, 2007, 2008, 2009–10, 2016–17, 2024	—
Monterrey	5	2010–11, 2011–12, 2012–13, 2019, 2021	—
Toluca	3	1968, 2003, 2026	1998, 2006, 2013–14
Pumas UNAM	3	1980, 1982, 1989	2005, 2022
Guadalajara	2	1962, 2018	1963, 2007
Atlante	2	1983, 2008–09	1994
Tigres UANL	1	2020	2015–16, 2016–17, 2019, 2026
León	1	2023	1993
Necaxa	1	1999	1996
Atlético Español	1	1975	—
Leones Negros UdeG	1	1978 (Note: Shared title.)	—
Puebla	1	1991	—
Morelia	0	—	2002, 2003
Santos Laguna	0	—	2011–12, 2012–13
CONCACAF Cup Winners Cup (defunct)
Necaxa	1	1994	—
Monterrey	1	1993	—
Tecos	1	1995	—
CONCACAF Giants Cup (defunct)
América	1	2001	—

Continental (CONMEBOL)
Club	Titles	Winning years	Runners-up
CONMEBOL Libertadores
Cruz Azul	0	—	2001
Guadalajara	0	—	2010
Tigres UANL	0	—	2015
CONMEBOL Sudamericana
Pachuca	1	2006	—
Pumas UNAM	0	—	2005
América	0	—	2007
CONMEBOL Recopa
Pachuca	0	—	2007

=== Regional competitions ===
Regional (CCCF)
Club	Titles	Winning years	Runners-up
Championship of Central America and Mexico (defunct)
Guadalajara	0	—	1959

Regional (USSF–FMF)
Club	Titles	Winning years	Runners-up
Leagues Cup
Cruz Azul	1	2019	—
León	1	2021	—
Toluca	1	2026	—
Tigres UANL	0	—	2019
Monterrey	0	—	2026
North American SuperLiga (defunct)
Pachuca	1	2007	—
Tigres UANL	1	2009	—
Morelia	1	2010	—
Campeones Cup
Tigres UANL	2	2018, 2023	—
América	1	2024	2019
Toluca	1	2025	—
Cruz Azul	0	—	2021, 2026
Atlas	0	—	2022

== International records ==
=== FIFA Club World Cup ===
Year	Club	Progress	Results	Opponents
(Brazil) 2000	Necaxa	3rd place	1–1 (4–3 p)	(Spain); Real Madrid
(Japan) 2006	América	4th place	1–2	(Egypt); Al Ahly
(Japan) 2007	Pachuca	5th place (Note: Shared.)	0–1	(Tunisia); Étoile du Sahel
(Japan) 2008	Pachuca	4th place	0–1	(Japan); Gamba Osaka
(United Arab Emirates) 2009	Atlante	4th place	1–1 (3–4 p)	(South Korea); Pohang Steelers
(United Arab Emirates) 2010	Pachuca	5th place	2–2 (4–2 p)	(United Arab Emirates); Al Wahda
(Japan) 2011	Monterrey	5th place	3–2	(Tunisia); Espérance de Tunis
(Japan) 2012	Monterrey	3rd place	2–0	(Egypt); Al Ahly
(Morocco) 2013	Monterrey	5th place	5–1	(Egypt); Al Ahly
(Morocco) 2014	Cruz Azul	4th place	1–1 (2–4 p)	(New Zealand); Auckland City
(Japan) 2015	América	5th place	2–1	(Democratic Republic of the Congo); Mazembe
(Japan) 2016	América	4th place	2–2 (3–4 p)	(Colombia); Atlético Nacional
(United Arab Emirates) 2017	Pachuca	3rd place	4–1	(United Arab Emirates); Al Jazira Club
(United Arab Emirates) 2018	Guadalajara	6th place	1–1 (5–6 p)	(Tunisia); Espérance de Tunis
(Qatar) 2019	Monterrey	3rd place	2–2 (4–3 p)	(Saudi Arabia); Al-Hilal
(Qatar) 2020	Tigres UANL	Runners-up	0–1	(Germany); Bayern Munich
(United Arab Emirates) 2021	Monterrey	5th place	3–1	(United Arab Emirates); Al Jazira Club
(Saudi Arabia) 2023	León	5th place	0–1	(Japan); Urawa Red Diamonds
(United States) 2025	Monterrey	Round of 16	1–2	(Germany); Borussia Dortmund
(United States) 2025	Pachuca	Group stage	1–2; 1–3; 0–2	(Austria); Red Bull Salzburg (Spain); Real Madrid (Saudi Arabia); Al-Hilal

=== FIFA Intercontinental Cup ===
Year	Club	Progress	Result	Opponents
(Qatar) 2024	Pachuca	Runners-up	0–3	(Spain); Real Madrid

=== FIFA Challenger Cup ===
Year	Club	Progress	Result	Opponents
(Qatar) 2024	Pachuca	Champions	0–0 (6–5 p)	(Egypt); Al Ahly

=== FIFA Derby of the Americas ===
Year	Club	Progress	Result	Opponents
(Qatar) 2024	Pachuca	Champions	3–0	(Brazil); Botafogo
(Qatar) 2025	Cruz Azul	Runners-up	1–2	(Brazil); Flamengo

=== Copa Interamericana (defunct) ===
Year	Club	Progress	Results	Opponents
1969	Toluca	Runners-up	2–1; 1–2; 0–3	(Argentina); Estudiantes de La Plata
1972	Cruz Azul	Runners-up	1–1; 1–2	(Uruguay); Nacional
1976	Atlético Español	Runners-up	2–2; 0–0 (4–5 p)	(Argentina); Independiente
1978	América	Champions	1–0; 0–3; 2–1	(Argentina); Boca Juniors
1981	Pumas UNAM	Champions	3–1; 1–3; 2–1	(Uruguay); Nacional
1990	Pumas UNAM	Runners-up	0–2; 1–4	(Colombia); Atlético Nacional
1991	América	Champions	1–1; 2–1	(Paraguay); Olimpia
1992	Puebla	Runners-up	1–3; 1–4	(Chile); Colo-Colo

=== CONCACAF Champions Cup ===
Year	Club	Progress	Results	Opponents
1962	Guadalajara	Champions	5–0; 1–0	(Guatemala); Comunicaciones
1963	Guadalajara	Runners-up	w/o	(Haiti); Racing CH
1968	Toluca	Champions	Transvaal and Aurora disqualified.	
1969	Cruz Azul	Champions	1–0; 0–0	(Guatemala); Comunicaciones
1970	Cruz Azul	Champions	Saprissa and Transvaal withdrew.	
1971	Cruz Azul	Champions	5–1	(Costa Rica); Alajuelense
1975	Atlético Español	Champions	3–0; 2–1	(Suriname); Transvaal
1977	América	Champions	1–0; 1–1	(Suriname); Robinhood
1978	Leones Negros UdeG	Champions	The final round was canceled and the three qualified clubs were declared joint champions.	
1980	Pumas UNAM	Champions	Final round	(Honduras); Pumas UNAH (Suriname); Robinhood
1982	Pumas UNAM	Champions	0–0; 3–2	(Suriname); Robinhood
1983	Atlante	Champions	1–1; 5–0	(Suriname); Robinhood
1987	América	Champions	1–1; 2–0	(Trinidad and Tobago); Defence Force
1989	Pumas UNAM	Champions	1–1; 3–1	(Cuba); Pinar del Río
1990	América	Champions	2–2; 6–0	(Cuba); Pinar del Río
1991	Puebla	Champions	3–1; 1–1	(Trinidad and Tobago); Police
1992	América	Champions	1–0	(Costa Rica); Alajuelense
1993	León	Runners-up	Final round	(Costa Rica); Saprissa (Guatemala); Municipal (Suriname); Robinhood
1994	Atlante	Runners-up	2–3	(Costa Rica); Cartaginés
1996	Cruz Azul	Champions	Final round	(Guatemala); Comunicaciones (United States); Seattle Sounders
1996	Necaxa	Runners-up	Final round	(Guatemala); Comunicaciones (United States); Seattle Sounders
1997	Cruz Azul	Champions	5–3	(United States); LA Galaxy
1998	Toluca	Runners-up	0–1	(United States); D.C. United
1999	Necaxa	Champions	2–1	(Costa Rica); Alajuelense
2002	Pachuca	Champions	1–0	Morelia
2002	Morelia	Runners-up	–	
2003	Toluca	Champions	3–3; 2–1	Morelia
2003	Morelia	Runners-up	–	
2005	Pumas UNAM	Runners-up	0–2; 2–1	(Costa Rica); Saprissa
2006	América	Champions	0–0; 2–1 (a.e.t.)	Toluca
2006	Toluca	Runners-up	–	
2007	Pachuca	Champions	2–2; 0–0 (7–6 p)	Guadalajara
2007	Guadalajara	Champions	–	
2008	Pachuca	Champions	1–1; 2–1	(Costa Rica); Saprissa
2008–09	Atlante	Champions	2–0; 0–0	Cruz Azul
2008–09	Cruz Azul	Runners-up	–	
2009–10	Pachuca	Champions	1–2; 1–0 (a.g.)	Cruz Azul
2009–10	Cruz Azul	Runners-up	–	
2010–11	Monterrey	Champions	2–2; 1–0	(United States); Real Salt Lake
2011–12	Monterrey	Champions	2–0; 1–2	Santos Laguna
2011–12	Santos Laguna	Runners-up	–	
2012–13	Monterrey	Champions	0–0; 4–2	Santos Laguna
2012–13	Santos Laguna	Runners-up	–	
2013–14	Cruz Azul	Champions	0–0; 1–1 (a.g.)	Toluca
2013–14	Toluca	Runners-up	–	
2014–15	América	Champions	1–1; 4–2	(Canada); CF Montréal
2015-16	América	Champions	2–0; 2–1	Tigres UANL
2015-16	Tigres UANL	Runners-up	–	
2016–17	Pachuca	Champions	1–1; 1–0	Tigres UANL
2016–17	Tigres UANL	Runners-up	–	
2018	Guadalajara	Champions	2–1; 1–2 (4–2 p)	(Canada); Toronto FC
2019	Monterrey	Champions	1–0; 1–1	Tigres UANL
2019	Tigres UANL	Runners-up	–	
2020	Tigres UANL	Champions	2–1	(United States); Los Angeles FC
2021	Monterrey	Champions	1–0	América
2021	América	Runners-up	–	
2022	Pumas UNAM	Runners-up	2–2; 0–3	(United States); Seattle Sounders FC
2023	León	Champions	2–1; 1–0	(United States); Los Angeles FC
2024	Pachuca	Champions	3–0	(United States); Columbus Crew
2025	Cruz Azul	Champions	5–0	(Canada); Vancouver Whitecaps FC
2026	Toluca	Champions	1–1 (6–5 p)	Tigres UANL
2026	Tigres UANL	Runners-up	–	

=== CONCACAF Cup Winners Cup (defunct) ===
Year	Club	Progress	Results	Opponents
1993	Monterrey	Champions	Final Round	(Honduras); RCD España (El Salvador); Luis Ángel Firpo (Guatemala); Suchitepéquez
1994	Necaxa	Champions	3–0	(Guatemala); Aurora
1995	Tecos	Champions	2–1	(El Salvador); Luis Ángel Firpo

=== CONCACAF Giants Cup (defunct) ===
Year	Club	Progress	Results	Opponents
2001	América	Champions	2–0	(United States); D.C. United

=== Championship of Central America and Mexico (defunct) ===
Year	Club	Progress	Results	Opponents
1959	Guadalajara	Runners-up	Round-robin	(Honduras); Olimpia (Costa Rica); Alajuelense (El Salvador); FAS

=== Leagues Cup ===
Year	Club	Progress	Results	Opponents
2019	Cruz Azul	Champions	2–1	Tigres UANL
2019	Tigres UANL	Runners-up	—	
2021	León	Champions	3–2	(United States); Seattle Sounders FC
2026	Toluca	Champions	2–0	Monterrey
2026	Monterrey	Runners-up	—	

=== North American SuperLiga (defunct) ===
Year	Club	Progress	Results	Opponents
2007	Pachuca	Champions	1–1 (4–3 p)	(United States); LA Galaxy
2009	Tigres UANL	Champions	1–1 (4–3 p)	(United States); Chicago Fire FC
2010	Morelia	Champions	2–1	(United States); New England Revolution

=== Campeones Cup ===
Year	Club	Progress	Results	Opponents
2018	Tigres UANL	Champions	3–1	(Canada); Toronto FC
2019	América	Runners-up	2–3	(United States); Atlanta United
2021	Cruz Azul	Runners-up	0–2	(United States); Columbus Crew
2022	Atlas	Runners-up	0–2	(United States); New York City FC
2023	Tigres UANL	Champions	0–0 (4–2 p)	(United States); Los Angeles FC
2024	América	Champions	1–1 (5–4 p)	(United States); Columbus Crew
2025	Toluca	Champions	3–2	(United States); LA Galaxy
2026	Cruz Azul	Runners-up	0–2	(United States); Inter Miami CF

=== CONMEBOL Libertadores ===
Mexican clubs participated in the Copa Libertadores from 1998 to 2016.

Year	Club	Progress	Results	Opponents
2001	Cruz Azul	Runners-up	0–1; 1–0 (1–3 p)	(Argentina); Boca Juniors
2010	Guadalajara	Runners-up	1–2; 2–3	(Brazil); Internacional
2015	Tigres UANL	Runners-up	0–0; 0–3	(Argentina); River Plate

=== CONMEBOL Sudamericana ===
Mexican clubs participated in the Copa Sudamericana from 2005 to 2008.

Year	Club	Progress	Results	Opponents
2005	Pumas UNAM	Runners-up	1–1; 1–1 (3–4 p)	(Argentina); Boca Juniors
2006	Pachuca	Champions	1–1; 2–1	(Chile); Colo-Colo
2007	América	Runners-up	2–3; 2–1 (a.g.)	(Argentina); Arsenal de Sarandí

=== CONMEBOL Recopa ===
Year	Club	Progress	Results	Opponents
2007	Pachuca	Runners-up	2–1; 0–4	(Brazil); Internacional

== See also ==
- Football in Mexico
- Mexican Football Federation
- Liga MX
