= Chelato Uclés National Stadium =

Football stadium

Coordinates: 14°5′54″N 87°12′14″W

Estadio Nacional José de la Paz Herrera Uclés
- El Nacional, El coloso del barrio Morazán,
- Interactive map of Estadio Nacional José de la Paz Herrera Uclés
- Full name: Estadio Nacional José de la Paz Herrera (Chelato Uclés)
- Former names: Estadio Nacional Tiburcio Carías Andino
- Location: Tegucigalpa, Honduras
- Owner: Government of Honduras
- Operator: CONDEPOR
- Capacity: 35,000
- Surface: GrassMaster
- Field size: 105 x 65 m

Construction
- Built: 1946
- Opened: 15 March 1948; 78 years ago
- Expanded: 1978
- Architect: Francisco Pratts

Tenants
- Olimpia (1948–present); Motagua (1948–present); Lobos UPNFM (2017–2021); Pumas UNAH (1972–89; 1996–2007); Real Maya (1992–97); Federal (1974–78; 1999–2000); Honduras national football team

The Chelato Uclés National Stadium (Spanish: Estadio Nacional Chelato Uclés) is a multi-purpose stadium in Tegucigalpa, Honduras. It is used mostly for association football matches. The stadium has a capacity of 35,000 and is the home of football clubs Motagua and Olimpia. This is one of the oldest stadiums in Honduras and has an important historical role for it, since emblematic matches in the history of Honduran Football have been held in this stadium, as well as concerts and presidential inaugurations.

== History ==
=== 1940s–1960s ===
The National Stadium of Tegucigalpa's construction was approved during the administration of Tiburcio Carías Andino with a decree issued by then Minister of Education Ángel G. Hernández and finished in 1948. The stadium was the Honduras national football team's home stadium in FIFA World Cup qualification for many years. In 1955 hosted the CCCF championship, later in 1967 hosted the CONCACAF Championships.

=== 1970s–2000s ===
In 1978, the stadium was host to 6 CONCACAF nations (Honduras, Mexico, El Salvador, Canada, Haiti and Cuba) for qualifying matches for the 1982 World Cup, which saw Honduras qualify for a World Cup for the first time ever. Since the 1998 completion of Estadio Olimpico Metropolitano, Estadio Nacional has no longer hosted the majority of the Honduran national team's home fixtures.

The stadium has undergone changes over time, some of less importance and others of greater importance, among them is the remodeling of the stadium prior to NORCECA in 1981, increasing the capacity of this sports facility to 34,000 spectators.

=== 2000s–present ===
The stadium hosted the 2009 UNCAF Nations Cup, where Panama won its first Central American championship and Nicaragua qualified for its first Gold Cup.

The stadium entrance in 2021.

With the purpose of getting the qualifying matches of the Honduran soccer team towards South Africa 2010, for the National stadium; the president of the National Commission for Sports Facilities (CONAPID), officially announced on April 9, 2007, the purchase abroad of synthetic grass by the government of the Republic. The removal of the grass, repairs to the drainage, leveling of the playing field and expansion of the same, as well as the sowing of the new natural grass of the Bermuda type, which is the most suitable for playing football.

On February 8, 2009, the giant screen placed in the national stadium was turned on for the first time; many years went by without a suitable electronic scoreboard for this monument to sport. The screen was donated by a mobile phone company Tigo2 at a cost of 544 thousand 96 US dollars (10 million 337 thousand Lempiras), with dimensions of 15 meters long and 10 meters wide. It weighs about 4,500 pounds (2,041 kg) and has a capacity of 549 trillion colors, built in blocks, to facilitate future repairs. The display was made by Hi Tech Electronics.

==== Name change ====
On March 9, 2022, the National Congress of Honduras managed to rename the stadium as "José de la Paz Herrera Uclés", in honor of the soccer coach of the same name and better known as Chelato Uclés, who died the previous year.

==== 2023 remodels ====
Since the stadium had not received mentoring for more than a decade and since it was becoming obsolete due to the new standards, the change of its grass was announced, since it was imported from Europe, in addition to the installation of 18,000 new seats in the other areas of the stadium, this in addition to the process of repair and remodeling of the bathrooms of the same.

Around this time, the stadium became the de facto home of the Honduran national football team, likely due to Estadio Olímpico Metropolitano, the previous home stadium, being obsolete.

By 2023, the new hybrid grass had been installed in the stadium, and a few months later, the reconstruction of the north part of the stadium had begun, with competition estimated for late 2025. When it’s finished, the north part will have a roof, 5,000 seats, and a shopping center below.

== Notable events ==
=== Association football ===
The Stadium is mainly used for association football matches since the late 1940s. Several iconic matches have been played inside it, specially the so-called capital superclassic, the most watched match at the national level where the two main rival teams Olimpia and Motagua face each other. Estadio Nacional Chelato Uclés has also hosted the following major international football events:

Competition	Years
CCCF Championship	1955
CONCACAF Championship	1967, 1981
Copa Centroamericana	1993, 2001, 2009
Central American Games	1990
CCCF Youth Championship	1960
CONCACAF Under-20 Championship	1978, 1994, 2022
CONCACAF U-17 Championship	1987, 2007
CONCACAF Champions League Finals	1972, 1980, 1988
CONCACAF League Finals	2018, 2019, 2021, 2022
Copa Interamericana Finals	1972, 1988
UNCAF Interclub Cup Finals	1999, 2005, 2006, 2007

=== American football ===
American football has also been played inside the stadium, the most popular being the American Women's Football championship known as the Americas Womans Bowl. The National Federation of American Football of Honduras (FENAFAH), in coordination with the sports leagues that activate this organism; they launched the new game seasons for this sport.

=== Concerts ===
The stadium has been used on several occasions for concerts by artists such as Daddy Yankee, Luis Miguel and Vicente Fernandez. For this they have had to be restored since during them the capacity of the stadium increased.
