= Kupası =

Kupası is the Turkish word for Cup, may refer to:

- Başbakanlık Kupası (Northern Cyprus), the tournament of the Cyprus Turkish Football Federation
- Cumhurbaşkanlığı Kupası, supercup tournament of the Cyprus Turkish Football Federation
- Dr. Fazıl Küçük Kupası, the tournament of the Cyprus Turkish Football Federation
- Federasyon Kupası, the top knockout tournament of the Cyprus Turkish Football Federation
- Türkiye Kupası 2003-04, the 42nd edition of the annual Turkish Cup
- Türkiye Kupası 2004-05, the 43rd edition of the annual Turkish Cup
- Türkiye Kupası 2005-06, the 44th edition of the annual Turkish Cup
- Türkiye Kupası 2007–08, the 45th edition of the annual Turkish Cup
- Türkiye Kupası 2007-08, the 46th edition of the annual Turkish Cup
- Türkiye Kupası 2008–09, the 47th season of Turkey's annual cup competition

== See also ==
- Football in Turkey - For complete list of Football Cup in Turkey
