= 1980 President's Cup =

1980 President's Cup may refer to:

- 1980 President's Cup (Maldives)
- 1980 President's Cup Football Tournament

== See also ==
- President's Cup (disambiguation)
