= 1981 President's Cup =

1981 President's Cup may refer to:

- 1981 President's Cup (Maldives)
- 1981 President's Cup Football Tournament

== See also ==
- President's Cup (disambiguation)
