= 1961 Campeonato Centroamericano y Caribe =

Tournament details
- Dates: April 23 – December 5, 1961
- Teams: 5 (from 5 associations)

Tournament statistics
- Matches played: 8
- Goals scored: 24 (3 per match)

The 1961 Campeonato Centroamericano y Caribe (English: Central American and Caribbean Championship) was the second edition of the regional club competition organized by CCCF. The participating clubs were the champions of their respective leagues. The tournament was composed of 4 clubs from Central America and one Caribbean club. The 1961 edition did not involve North American clubs; instead, the Central American champions from the four-team playoff would face off against the Caribbean club.

== Participating clubs ==
=== Central America ===
(El Salvador) Águila
(Costa Rica) Alajuelense
(Guatemala) Comunicaciones
(Honduras) Olimpia

=== Caribbean ===
(Netherlands Antilles) Jong Holland

== Matches ==
=== Quarterfinals ===
April 23, 1961	Comunicaciones (Guatemala)	0–1	(El Salvador) Águila

April 30, 1961	Águila (El Salvador)	2–2 (3–2 agg.)	(Guatemala) Comunicaciones

May 14, 1961	Olimpia (Honduras)	1–1	(Costa Rica) Alajuelense

May 21, 1961	Alajuelense (Costa Rica)	3–1 (4–2 agg.)	(Honduras) Olimpia

=== Semifinals ===
June 18, 1961	Alajuelense (Costa Rica)	6–0	(El Salvador) Águila

October 1, 1961	Águila (El Salvador)	1–1 (1–7 agg.)	(Costa Rica) Alajuelense

=== Final ===
December 3, 1961	Jong Holland (Netherlands Antilles)	1–1	(Costa Rica) Alajuelense	Willemstad

December 5, 1961	Jong Holland (Netherlands Antilles)	1–2 (2–3 agg.)	(Costa Rica) Alajuelense	Willemstad
