= Başbakanlık Kupası =

Başbakanlık Kupası may refer to one of the two football knockout competitions:

- Chancellor Cup (Turkish: Başbakanlık Kupası) a defunct competition in Turkey
- Başbakanlık Kupası (Northern Cyprus)
