= Brunel University Barbarians Rugby League =

Brunel University

Club information
- Full name: Brunel University Rugby League
- Founded: 2007

Current details
- Ground: Brunel University Playing Fields
- Competition: BUCS Rugby League - South

Brunel Rugby League are a student rugby league club from Uxbridge, West London, England. The club play in the SRL London/South.

The club were reformed in Winter 2007 after a ten-year hiatus. From the very beginning close links were formed with the Rugby Football League and Harlequins RL. The latter oversaw the new side as they found their feet, ensuring that the coaching was of a suitable standard and promoting the team both on campus, and through their website until a good group of players were there to build on.

After six months under the affiliation of the London Amateur Rugby League, the club completed its first three games (which included a small scale tour to Wales) and obtained their first victory when they defeated Aberystwyth University in the return match from that trip in October 2008.

The club won the South East 1A league in the 2012/13 season and then reclaiming the title in 2014/15 season.

== Honours ==
- RFL Andrew Cudbertson "Spirit of SRL" Award
- Brunel University Sports Federation Club of the Year Runner-up
- Brunel University Sports Federation Most Developed Club
- South West Rugby League 9s Bowl Runners-up
- South East 1A League Champions (2012/13, 2014/15)

== See also ==
- Brunel University
- B1000 (Brunel University) Radio
