= 1982 President's Cup =

1982 President's Cup may refer to:

- 1982 President's Cup (Maldives)
- 1982 President's Cup Football Tournament

== See also ==
- President's Cup (disambiguation)
