= 1956 CCCF Youth Championship =

Tournament details
- Host country: El Salvador
- City: San Salvador
- Dates: December
- Teams: 5

Final positions
- Champions: El Salvador (1st title)
- Runners-up: Netherlands Antilles
- Third place: Costa Rica
- Fourth place: Guatemala

Tournament statistics
- Matches played: 10
- Goals scored: 30 (3 per match)

The 1956 CCCF Youth Championship was an age restricted association football competition organised by the CCCF (English: Football Confederation of Central America and the Caribbean). All games were hosted in San Salvador and took place in December.

Pos	Team	Pld	W	D	L	GF	GA	GD	Pts
1	El Salvador	4	3	1	0	12	2	+10	7
2	Netherlands Antilles	4	2	2	0	8	1	+7	6
3	Costa Rica	4	2	0	2	8	4	+4	4
4	Guatemala	4	0	2	2	1	5	−4	2
5	Honduras	4	0	1	3	1	18	−17	1

Source: rsssf

Guatemala	0–2	El Salvador

Costa Rica	0–2	Netherlands Antilles

Costa Rica	5–0	Honduras

Netherlands Antilles	1–1	El Salvador

Costa Rica	2–0	Guatemala

Netherlands Antilles	5–0	Honduras

Guatemala	0–0	Netherlands Antilles

El Salvador	7–0	Honduras

Costa Rica	1–2	El Salvador

Guatemala	1–1	Honduras

== See also ==
- Football competitions in El Salvador
- Football in Central America
