= 1958 CCCF Youth Championship =

Tournament details
- Host country: Guatemala
- City: Ciudad de Guatemala
- Dates: 16–25 March
- Teams: 5

Final positions
- Champions: Guatemala (1st title)
- Runners-up: Honduras
- Third place: Costa Rica
- Fourth place: El Salvador

Tournament statistics
- Matches played: 10
- Goals scored: 38 (3.8 per match)

The 1958 CCCF Youth Championship was an age restricted association football competition organised by the CCCF (English: Football Confederation of Central America and the Caribbean). All games were hosted in Ciudad de Guatemala and took place between 16 and 25 March.

Pos	Team	Pld	W	D	L	GF	GA	GD	Pts
1	Guatemala	4	3	1	0	7	2	+5	7
2	Honduras	4	2	1	1	8	3	+5	5
3	Costa Rica	4	2	0	2	13	2	+11	4
4	El Salvador	4	1	0	3	7	12	−5	2
5	Nicaragua	4	0	0	4	3	19	−16	0

Source: rsssf

Guatemala	1-0	Honduras

Costa Rica	5-1	El Salvador

Guatemala	2-1	El Salvador

Costa Rica	7-0	Nicaragua

El Salvador	bt	Nicaragua

Costa Rica	1-1	Honduras

Honduras	bt	Nicaragua

Guatemala	4-1	Nicaragua

Honduras	bt	El Salvador

Costa Rica	0-0	Guatemala

== See also ==
- Football competitions in Guatemala
- Football in Central America
