= 1959 Campeonato Centroamericano =

Tournament details
- Dates: May 1–17, 1959
- Teams: 4 (from 4 associations)

Tournament statistics
- Matches played: 6
- Goals scored: 20 (3.33 per match)

The 1959 Campeonato Centroamericano (English: Central American Championship) was the first edition of the regional club competition organized by CCCF. It was the first international club tournament for clubs from Central America and North America. The participating clubs were the champions of their respective leagues. The tournament was composed of 3 clubs from Central America and one North American club.

== Participating clubs ==
=== Central America ===
(El Salvador) FAS
(Costa Rica) Alajuelense
(Honduras) Olimpia

=== North America ===
(Mexico) Guadalajara

== Matches ==
May 1, 1959

(El Salvador) FAS	0–2	(Costa Rica) Alajuelense
		Juan Ulloa 17', 64'

May 7, 1959

(El Salvador) FAS	1–1	(Mexico) Guadalajara
Omar Murano 67'		Sabás Ponce 50'

May 10, 1959

(Honduras) Olimpia	2–3	(Mexico) Guadalajara
Guerrero 76'; Solís 86'		Luis de la Torre 8', 24'; Crescencio Gutiérrez 28'

May 14, 1959

(Costa Rica) Alajuelense	1–1	(Mexico) Guadalajara
Herrera 90' (pen.)		Moreno 20'

May 15, 1959

(Honduras) Olimpia	2–0	(El Salvador) FAS

May 17, 1959

(Costa Rica) Alajuelense	3–4	(Honduras) Olimpia
Solís 21' (o.g.); Juan Ulloa 24'; Villalobos 40'		Leaky 36'; Rodríguez 59', 80'; Pavón 65' (pen.)

== Standings ==
Pos	Club	P	W	D	L	GF	GA	GD	Pts	Result
1	(Honduras) Olimpia	3	2	0	1	8	6	+2	4	Champions^{1}
2	(Mexico) Guadalajara	3	1	2	0	5	4	+1	4	Runners-up
3	(Costa Rica) Alajuelense	3	1	1	1	6	5	+1	3	
4	(El Salvador) FAS	3	0	1	2	1	5	-4	1	

Notes

1. Olimpia were declared champions by best goal difference.
