= 1954 CCCF Youth Championship =

Tournament details
- Host country: Costa Rica
- City: San José
- Dates: 5–19 December
- Teams: 5

Final positions
- Champions: Costa Rica (1st title)
- Runners-up: Panama
- Third place: Curaçao
- Fourth place: Guatemala

Tournament statistics
- Matches played: 10
- Goals scored: 32 (3.2 per match)

The 1954 CCCF Youth Championship was an age restricted association football competition organised by the Football Confederation of Central America and the Caribbean. All games were hosted in San José and took place between 5 and 19 December.

| Pos | Team | Pld | W | D | L | GF | GA | GD | Pts |
|---|---|---|---|---|---|---|---|---|---|
| 1 | Costa Rica | 4 | 3 | 1 | 0 | 10 | 4 | +6 | 7 |
| 2 | Panama | 4 | 3 | 0 | 1 | 6 | 4 | +2 | 6 |
| 3 | Curaçao | 4 | 2 | 0 | 2 | 9 | 7 | +2 | 4 |
| 4 | Guatemala | 4 | 1 | 1 | 2 | 4 | 7 | −3 | 3 |
| 5 | El Salvador | 4 | 0 | 0 | 4 | 3 | 10 | −7 | 0 |

Source: rsssf

| Costa Rica | 3–1 | El Salvador |

| Curaçao | 1–2 | Panama |

| Guatemala | 0–1 | Panama |

| Costa Rica | 2–0 | Curaçao |

| Curaçao | 4–2 | El Salvador |

| Costa Rica | 3–1 | Panama |

| Guatemala | 1–4 | Curaçao |

| Panama | 2–0 | El Salvador |

| Guatemala | 1–0 | El Salvador |

| Costa Rica | 2–2 | Guatemala |
