= 1960 CCCF Youth Championship =

Tournament details
- Host country: Honduras
- City: Tegucigalpa
- Dates: 14–28 August
- Teams: 5

Final positions
- Champions: Costa Rica (2nd title)
- Runners-up: Honduras
- Third place: Panama
- Fourth place: El Salvador

Tournament statistics
- Matches played: 10
- Goals scored: 21 (2.1 per match)

The 1960 CCCF Youth Championship was an age restricted association football competition organised by the CCCF (English: Football Confederation of Central America and the Caribbean). All games were hosted in Tegucigalpa, Honduras and took place between 14 and 28 August.

Pos	Team	Pld	W	D	L	GF	GA	GD	Pts
1	Costa Rica	4	3	0	1	7	5	+2	6
2	Honduras	4	2	1	1	6	2	+4	5
3	Panama	4	2	1	1	3	2	+1	5
4	El Salvador	4	0	2	2	3	5	−2	2
5	Guatemala	4	0	2	2	2	7	−5	2

Source: rsssf

Costa Rica	1–0	Panama

Guatemala	1–1	El Salvador

Costa Rica	4–0	Guatemala

Guatemala	0–1	Honduras

Costa Rica	2–1	El Salvador

Honduras	0–1	Panama

Guatemala	1–1	Panama

El Salvador	1–1	Honduras

Costa Rica	0–4	Honduras

Panama	1–0	El Salvador

== See also ==
- Football competitions in Honduras
- Football in Central America
