= Super Coupe National du Mali =

Super Coupe National du Mali National Super Cup of Mali
- Founded: 1993
- Region: Mali
- Teams: 2
- Current champions: Onze Créateurs de Niaréla (1st time)
- Most championships: Stade Malien (10 titles)
- 2016

The Super Coupe National (French for the National Super Cup) is a match competition in Mali football, played between the Malien Première Division (Malian Premier Division) champions and the Malian Cup winners. Sometimes, if a champion also has a cup title, the runner-up in the cup competition competes with the champion.

Nearly all of its matches were played in Bamako.

== Finals ==
Year	Winners	Score	Runners-up
1993	Djoliba AC (Bamako)		Stade Malien (Bamako)
1994	Djoliba AC (Bamako)		Stade Malien
1995	Not held		
1996	Not held		
1997	Djoliba AC (Bamako)		AS Réal (Bamako)
1998	Stade Malien (Bamako)		Djoliba AC (Bamako)
1999	Djoliba AC (Bamako)	1-0	Stade Malien (Bamako)
2000	Stade Malien (Bamako)		Cercle Olympique (Bamako)
2001	Stade Malien (Bamako)	1-0	Mamahira AC (Kati)
2002	Not held		
2003	Not held		
2004	Not held		
2005	Stade Malien (Bamako)	2-1	AS Bamako
2006	Stade Malien (Bamako)	0-0 (5-4 p)	AS Bamako
2007	Stade Malien (Bamako)	1-0	Djoliba AC (Bamako)
2008	Djoliba AC (Bamako)	5-2	Cercle Olympique (Bamako)
2009	Stade Malien (Bamako)	1-1 (3-1 p)	Djoliba AC (Bamako)
2010	Stade Malien (Bamako)	2-1	AS Réal (Bamako)
2011	Cercle Olympique (Bamako)	w/o	Stade Malien (Bamako)^{1}
2012	Djoliba AC (Bamako)	1-1 (6-5 p)	US Bougouni
2013	Djoliba AC (Bamako)	0-0 (4-2 p	Stade Malien (Bamako)
2014	Stade Malien (Bamako)	1-0	Onze Créateurs de Niaréla
2015	Stade Malien (Bamako)	0-0 (4-2 p	AS Onze Créateurs (Bamako)
2016	AS Onze Créateurs (Bamako)	1-0	Stade Malien (Bamako)

^{1}Stade Malien withdrew, the only super cup competition in Mali where no match were held
