= Liechtenstein Football Championship =

Most senior football competition in Liechtenstein before WW2

In the early 1930s, association football in Liechtenstein was quickly growing in popularity. In 1931, FC Ruggell was founded, whilst in 1932, FC Vaduz, FC Balzers, FC Triesen and FC Schaan were founded. Despite the growing interest of football in Liechtenstein, there was no FA, and hence no league for Liechtenstein, meaning that Liechtensteiner clubs had to play in different leagues, (Vaduz played in Austria, whilst Balzers, Triesen and Schaan played in Switzerland). Due to this, there was no definitive way to decide the champions of the country, and therefore, a group of Liechtensteiner clubs came together to form the Liechtenstein FA.

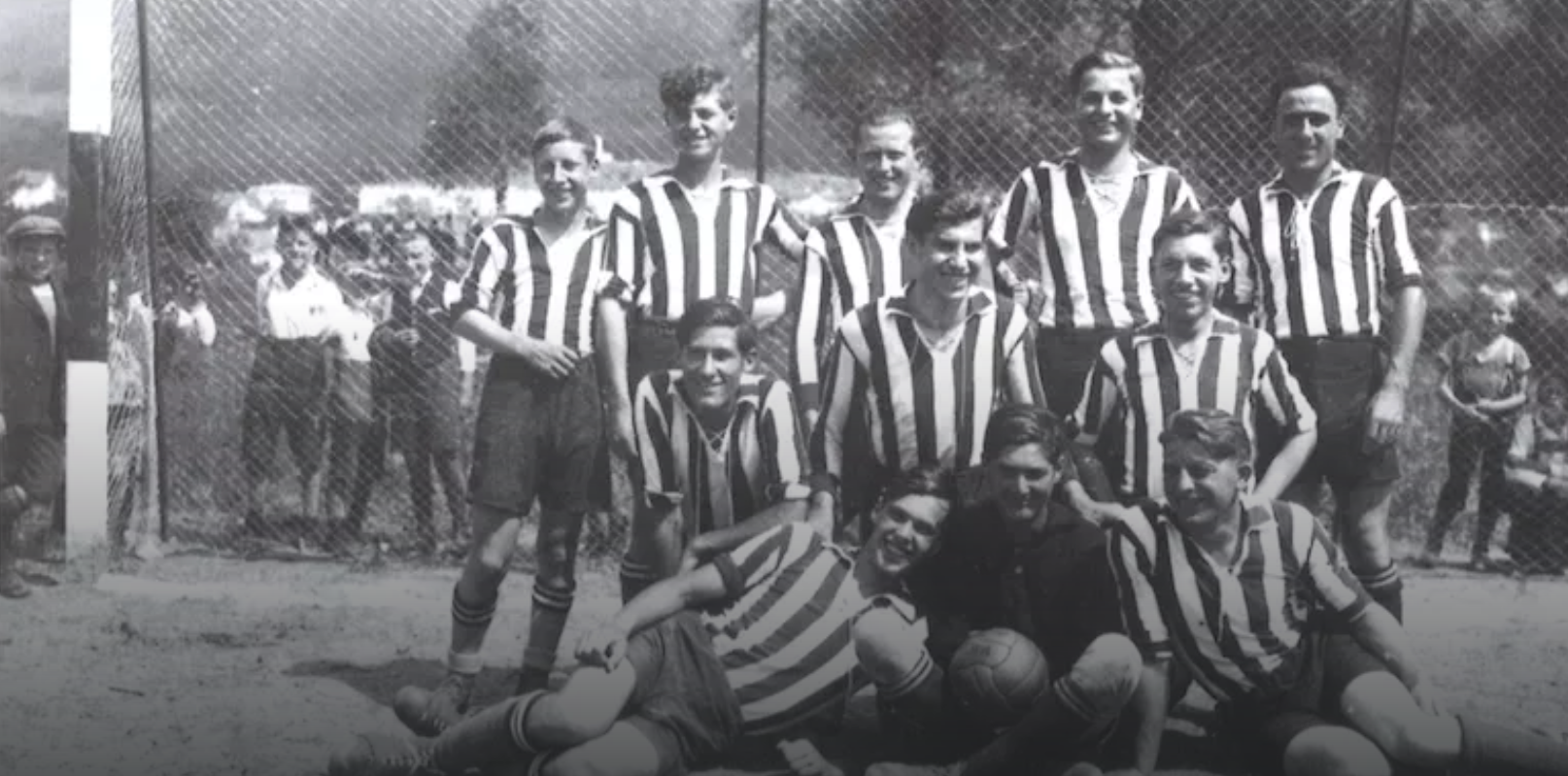
The FC Vaduz team that played in the first Liechtenstein Football Championship in the 1932-33 season.

In 1932, a few months after the foundation process had begun, the still work in progress Liechtenstein FA organised an unofficial tournament between the clubs from Liechtenstein. Despite this being an unofficial tournament, the stakes were high as this was the first time a Liechtensteiner club could crown itself champions of the country. Four clubs entered the tournament; Schaan, Triesen, Balzers, and Vaduz. Three rounds were played, with each game lasting 30-45mins, the Semi Finals, the Third place play-off and the Final. Vaduz defeated Balzers 2-0 in the final whilst Triesen beat Schaan 2-0 to finish third.

Following a break for one season, the now official Liechtenstein FA hosted the first official Liechtenstein Football Championship in 1934, lasting from March 18th until May 8th. FC Triesen managed to lift the trophy for the first time out of their 3 victories. Later on in 1934, the Liechtenstein FA hosted another unofficial version of the tournament. This time Austrian sides VfB Hohenems and FAC Feldkirch, as well as Swiss sides FC Buchs, FC Bad Ragaz and Chur were invited to join the competition. Furthermore, another Liechtensteiner team, Kickers Mühleholz who had previously remained in the Austrian FA, and therefore could not compete, joined the Liechtenstein FA. In the final, Kickers lost 3-1 at home to FC Schaan, spelling the end for the club that would be disbanded 3 months later at the start of 1935. Following the success of the 1934 unofficial tournament, only three teams, Vaduz, Triesen, and Balzers opted to enter the 1935 competition. Due to the lack of teams, each team played each other once and whoever had the highest points was declared the winner. Triesen won their second tournament, winning both games, and earning four points, whilst Vaduz and Balzers drew.

The following season, even less teams entered the 1936 competition, with only Vaduz and Triesen entering. The teams played two legs, Vaduz Winning 3-0 at home, but losing 3-2 away. Due to goal differential not playing a part in the tournament, a playoff was called, which FC Vaduz won. 1937 was the last year of the competition, both because of the lack of interest in the competition (Triesen were automatically crowned champions due to being the only team applying to join the competition), and the Second World War cancelling the next season's tournament.

Following WWII, the Liechtenstein Football Championship was discontinued, and replaced by the Liechtenstein Football Cup, which still runs as Liechtenstein's premier competition to this day.

== Roll of Honour ==
List of Champions:

1932: FC Vaduz (Unofficial)

1934: FC Triesen (Official)

1934: FC Schaan (Unofficial)

1935: FC Triesen (Official)

1936: FC Vaduz (Official)

1937: FC Triesen (Official)

Total Wins:

1) FC Triesen (x3)

2) FC Vaduz (x2)

3) FC Schaan (x1)
