= University and College Rugby League =

Top division of university rugby union in the United Kingdom

University Rugby League
- Current season, competition or edition: 2026-27 University Rugby League season
- Sport: Rugby league
- Founded: 1967
- Administrator: British Universities and Colleges Sport
- No. of teams: 48
- Country: Great Britain
- Most recent champion: Northumbria
- Website: https://www.bucs.org.uk/sports-page/rugby-league.html

The University and College Rugby League (UCRL), formerly known as the Student Rugby League, is the organisation which administrates university and college rugby league football in the United Kingdom, on behalf of the Rugby Football League and British Universities and Colleges Sport (BUCS).

Rugby league in universities has been an important vehicle for expansion of the game as players from outside the heartlands often first began to play at university level. Many continue to play after leaving university and this has led to the creation of teams in non-traditional areas such as London Skolars and the University of Gloucestershire All Golds.

Yorkshire Universities and Colleges played against Lancashire at Halifax's then ground The Shay, Halifax in 1976. The Yorkshire side was selected by Fred Lindop, coach and professional referee and included a number of players from Airedale & Wharfedale College. 22 - 0 down at half time the Yorkshire side fought back to tie the match at 22 - 22.

== History ==
Founded in 1967 when a team was created at Leeds University by Andrew Cudbertson, Jack Abernathy and Cec Thompson, other teams soon joined in areas of the United Kingdom which lay outside of the games traditional heartlands. The first university game was between Leeds and Liverpool in 1968. A year later the Universities and Colleges Rugby League was formed after student pioneers fought hard to get the sport recognised in higher education. Portsmouth and Swansea were early non-traditional areas to accept the game.

Rugby League reached Oxford University in 1976 and the first Varsity fixture against Cambridge University took place in 1981. The varsity match has 'discretionary full blue' status.

Student Rugby League reached Scotland in 1989 when a group of students at Aberdeen University established a team and formed the first Scotland Students squad.

The Pioneers were formed in 2005 and made their inaugural tour that year to Estonia. In the following years, development tours visited the Czech Republic, Latvia, Ukraine, Norway, Kazakhstan, Greece, Poland, Morocco and in 2014, to Ghana.

By 2006, the Student Rugby League had over 70 member clubs playing in 9 leagues, club locations ranging from Napier in Scotland to Exeter in the South West of England.

The elite Premier North & South competition was formed as the Super 6 in 2008.

In 2014, the Student Rugby League was renamed the university and College Rugby League (UCRL).

== Student Rugby League Pyramid ==
- Premier North & Premier South
- Northern 1, 2A & 2B; Midlands & Western 1; South East 1
- HE Merit League

The Premier North & South competition is the elite student league. Five matches from the 2011 Super 8 including the inaugural Grand Final were televised live and free-to-view on Premier Sports. The BUCS Competition is split into nine playing leagues with the Premier North and the Premier South being supported by five regional leagues. The fixtures run from October until March leading up to the Championship play-off series.

The U19's College Competition is split into three leagues, the North West, Yorkshire and the Premier Division. The college leagues play from September until March culminating in a top four play-off series. The Carnegie Champion Colleges is the knock-out competition for the Further Education sector.

Alongside SRL competitions, the top university sides can qualify for the Challenge Cup.

League Restructure

Following the 2023-24 season the pyramid was restructured to form the National League. The inaugural National League featured the top 4 teams from the Premier North and top 2 teams Premier South from the previous season. The team's for the inaugural 2025-26 season were: Exeter, Leeds, Leeds Beckett, Loughborough, Newcastle and Northumbria. Promotion to the National League is decided in a single leg playoff between the winners of Northern 1A and Southern 1A.

The remaining teams from the Premier North Division were moved to Northern 1A whilst teams from the Premier South were moved to Southern 1A. The Midlands & Western 1 division was renamed to Southern 2A whilst a new Southern 2B division was formed from teams primarily from Southern 1A.

Current BUCS Rugby League Pyramid:

Premier	National League			
Tier 1	Northern 1A		Southern 1A	
Tier 2	Northern 2A	Northern 2B	Southern 2A	Southern 2B

== Past winners ==
Year	Super 8	Premier North	Premier South	Northern 1A	Northern 2A	Northern 2B	Midlands 1A	Western 1A	South 1	South East 1A	Midlands 2A	Western 2A
2007-08	N/A	Leeds Metropolitan University	Loughborough University	Edinburgh Napier University	Bangor University	Leeds Metropolitan University 'A'	Nottingham University	N/A	N/A	N/A	Lincoln University	University of Wales Institute, Cardiff
2008-09	Leeds Metropolitan University	Edge Hill University	University of Wales Institute, Cardiff	Northumbria University 'A'	Bangor University	Leeds University	Cambridge University	N/A	N/A	Oxford Brookes University	Coventry University	University of Gloucestershire
2009-10	Loughborough University	University of Central Lancashire	Loughborough University 'A'	Leeds Trinity University	Liverpool University	York St Johns University	Sheffield Hallam University	N/A	N/A	Oxford Brookes University	Loughborough University 'B'	Glamorgan University
2010-11	Leeds Metropolitan University	Newcastle University	Exeter University	Northumbria University 'A'	University of Salford	Newcastle University 'A'	Nottingham Trent University	N/A	N/A	Exeter University 'A'	Coventry University	University of Wales Institute, Cardiff
2011-12	Leeds Metropolitan University	Leeds Metropolitan University 'A'	Exeter University	Northumbria University 'A'	Manchester Metropolitan University	Leeds Trinity University	Coventry University	University of the West of England	N/A	Oxford Brookes University	N/A	Bath University
2012-13	University of Gloucestershire	Newcastle University	Cardiff Metropolitan University	Northumbria University 'A'	Manchester Metropolitan University	Sheffield University	Nottingham Trent University 'A'	South Gloucestershire & Stroud College	N/A	Brunel University	N/A	University of Gloucestershire 'A'
2013-14	N/A	Leeds Metropolitan University	Loughborough University	Sheffield Hallam University	Manchester University	Leeds University	Nottingham University	Exeter University	N/A	Cambridge University	Warwick University	Swansea University
2014-15	N/A	Leeds Beckett University	Loughborough University	Manchester Metropolitan University	University of Central Lancashire (UCLAN)	York St John University	Coventry University	Swansea University	N/A	Brunel University	Oxford Brookes University	N/A
2015-16									N/A			
2016-17									N/A			
2017-18									N/A			
2018-19									N/A			
2019-20	N/A	Northumbria	St Mary's	Liverpool	Liverpool John Moores University	York St John	Nottingham 1s	Swansea 1a	N/A	Oxford Brookes	Northampton	
2020-21	COVID Season											
2021-22	N/A	Northumbria	St Mary's	Liverpool John Moors	University of Central Lancashire (UCLAN)	Leeds 2s	Birmingham	Exeter 2s		Cambridge	Loughborough 2s	N/A
2022-23	N/A	Leeds Beckett 1s	Exeter	University of Central Lancashire (UCLAN)	Manchester University	Leeds Beckett 2s	Nottingham	Exeter		Cambridge	N/A	
2023-24*	N/A	Northumbria	Loughborough	Northumbria 2s	Lancaster	Sheffield Hallam	Loughborough 2s		Exeter 2s		N/A	

== Winners Post 2024-25 ==
Year	National Championship	National League	National Trophy	Northern 1A	Southern 1A	Northern Conference Cup	Northern 2A	Northern 2B	Southern Conference Cup	Southern 2A	Southern 2B
2024-25	Leeds Beckett 1s	Leeds Beckett 1s	Nottingham 1s	Liverpool John Moores	Nottingham 1s	Sheffield Hallam	Liverpool	Sheffield Hallam	Cardiff	Cardiff	Oxford Brookes
2025-2026	Northumbria 1s	Northumbria 1s	Northumbria 2s	Hull	Nottingham Trent	Lancaster	Edge Hill	Leeds Beckett 2s	Gloucestershire	Gloucestershire	Oxford

== National League ==
Locations of National League Rugby teams

University	Debut	No. of Seasons
Exeter	2024-25	3
Hull	2026-27	1
Leeds Beckett	2024-25	3
Loughborough	2024-25	3
Northumbria	2024-25	3
Nottingham	2025-26	2

Season Structure

The Season has two phases:

- League - a double round-robin tournament, where teams play each other home away.
- Championship - a knockout tournament featuring the entire league.

=== League ===
The League season currently has 10 rounds. League points are awarded in the following way:

- 3 points for winning a match
- 1 point for drawing a match
- 0 points for losing a match

=== Championship ===
The Championship competition has three rounds. It features every team from the League.

Quarter Finals:

- 3rd v 6th
- 4th v 5th

Semi Finals:

- 1st vs 4th or 5th
- 2nd vs 3rd or 6th

Quarterfinals
4
5
3
6

Semifinals
1
2

Finals

=== Results ===
==== League and championship ====
Final Position	Season	Season
Final Position	2024-25	2025-26
1	Leeds Beckett (CH)	Northumbria (CH)
2	Northumbria (RU)	Leeds Beckett (RU)
3	Loughborough (SF)	Loughborough (SF)
4	Exeter	Exeter (SF)
5	Leeds (SF)	Nottingham
6	Newcastle (R)	Leeds (R)

(CH) Champions. (RU) Runners-up. (SF) Losing semi-finalists. (R) Relegated

==== Championship finals ====
Season	Champion	Score	Runner-up	Venue
Pre-National League
2019-20	Season interrupted by COVID-19			
2020-21	Season interrupted by COVID-19			
2021-22	Northumbria	28-19	Leeds Beckett	University of Loughborough 1st XV Pitch
2022-23	Northumbria	14-0	Leeds Beckett	University of Loughborough 1st XV Pitch
2023-24	Northumbria	34-0	Leeds Beckett	University of Loughborough 1st XV Pitch
National League
2024-25	Leeds Beckett	26-16	Northumbria	University of Loughborough 1st XV Pitch
2025-26	Northumbria	28-0	Leeds Beckett	University of Loughborough 1st XV Pitch

==== Relegation playoffs ====
Season	Winner	Score	Runner-up	Venue	Promoted from
2024-25	Nottingham 1s	Walkover	Liverpool John Moore's	N/A	Southern 1A
2024-25	Nottingham 1s	38-24	Newcastle 1s	Highfields Sports Complex	Southern 1A
2025-26	Hull	Walkover	Nottingham Trent	N/A	Northern 1A

== Representative teams ==
In England, a series of regional games take place which lead to a North and South team being selected to play the University Rugby League Origin Game, from which the England team is selected.

Wales, Scotland and Ireland run national teams.

All four teams take part in the 4 Nations Championships that take place annually and the Tertiary Student Rugby League World Cup every four years. England also take part in the RFL President's Cup.

Previoualy a Great Britain and Ireland Academic Lions squad has been selected but this has been mothballed since 2014.

The 'GB Pioneers' are a representative team that undertake rugby league development tours to emerging nations.

== See also ==
- Tertiary Student Rugby League World Cup
- Rugby league in England
- Rugby league in Scotland
- Rugby league in Wales
- British Amateur Rugby League Association
- British Universities and Colleges Sport
- Rugby League Varsity Match
