= RFL President's Cup =

Representative cup competition in British rugby league

- Sport: Rugby league
- Formerly known as: RFL Association's Cup
- Instituted: 2014
- Number of teams: 7 - (4 Men, 3 Women)
- Country: Great Britain (RFL)

The RFL President's Cup is an annual competition for men's and women's representative teams drawn from the British Rugby league structure and is run by the Rugby Football League (RFL). It was previously known as the RFL Association's Cup.

== History ==
The RFL Associations Cup was founded in 2014 following the previous year's Rugby League Festival Of World Cups (the series of Rugby League World Cups for women, wheelchair, police, armed forces and students) with a view to better preparing each of the competing British entries ahead of their inclusion in future World Cups.

Speaking at the launch of the competition, David Gent, the RFL's Director of Participation stated "This competition is about a regular fixed competition for these associations, but it is vital we support these squads in their attempts to win their respective World Cups."

Additional benefits for the women's team would be to give England selectors the opportunity to scout players from all sections of the women's game, to create higher intensity fixtures than the domestic competition at the time provided and to select players to the national women's squad.

The first season saw the men's competition involving Great Britain Students, Great Britain Armed Forces, Great Britain Teachers and Great Britain Police and the women's competition featuring England Students, Great Britain Armed Forces, Great Britain Teachers and The Lionesses - a team made up of players from the women's domestic league who were not eligible for any of the other three teams.

In 2015 England Universities replaced Great Britain Students in the men's competition following the movement of the Student Rugby League Four Nations Competition from the Easter period to a summer slot.

No men's or women's competition took place in 2017 owing to teams participating in the Festival of World Cups in Australia. During this year, Great Britain Armed Forces re-branded to become UK Armed Forces.

For the 2018 season, the competition was renamed RFL President's Cup. The women's competition was discontinued following the RFL revamping the international player pathway process and introducing a National Performance Programme with a focus on talent identification, player skill development, physical competences and the creation of a performance coaching environment in advance of the RFL opening a National Rugby League Centre in Manchester which will provide facilities for the England Women's team to train at. An Origin Game was also introduced to recreate international competition to develop the elite players.

The 2020 and 2021 seasons were cancelled as a result of the COVID-19 global pandemic, but the competition returned in 2022 which also saw the return of a women's competition, this time for only 3 teams; England Students, Great Britain Teachers and UK Armed Forces.

== Format ==
Each team plays each other once in a single round-robin competition, with the team finishing at the top of the league table being crowned champions.

Competition points are scored as follows:

- Win: 2 points
- Draw: 1 point
- Loss: 0 points
- Default on game: 0 points (with 24–0 score-line awarded to the opposition).

Where teams are tied on competition points, points difference (the cumulative number of points scored in all games minus the cumulative number of points conceded in all games) is used to determine league positions.

The Pankhurst Trophy, previously played for annually and awarded to the winner of the England Students v UK Armed Forces women's game, continues to be awarded to the winner of the fixture.

== Men's Competition ==
=== 2022 season ===
The fixtures for the 2022 season are:

Home	Score	Away	Match information
Home	Score	Away	Date and time	Venue
UK Armed Forces	52–0	Great Britain Police	30 March 2022, 6:00pm	Saddleworth Rangers
England Universities	32–12	Great Britain Teachers	30 March 2022, 8:00pm	Saddleworth Rangers
Great Britain Police	38–32	England Universities	27 April 2022, 6:00pm	Lock Lane
Great Britain Teachers	18–40	UK Armed Forces	27 April 2022, 8:00pm	Lock Lane
Great Britain Teachers	32–40	Great Britain Police	25 May 2022, 6:00pm	Leigh Miners Rangers
UK Armed Forces	14–26	England Universities	25 May 2022, 8:00pm	Leigh Miners Rangers

Pos	Team	Pld	W	D	L	PF	PA	PD	Pts
1	UK Armed Forces	3	2	0	1	106	44	+62	4
2	England Universities	3	2	0	1	90	64	+26	4
3	Great Britain Police	3	2	0	1	78	116	−38	4
4	Great Britain Teachers	3	0	0	3	62	112	−50	0

=== 2021 season ===
Competition did not take place.

=== 2020 season ===
Competition did not take place.

=== 2019 season ===
The fixtures for the 2019 season are:

Home	Score	Away	Match information
Home	Score	Away	Date and time	Venue
UK Armed Forces	38–6	Great Britain Police	10 April 2019, 6:00pm	Leigh Miners Rangers
England Universities	54–8	Great Britain Teachers	10 April 2019, 8:00pm	Leigh Miners Rangers
Great Britain Police	6–16	England Universities	8 May 2019, 6:00pm	Siddal A.R.L.F.C.
Great Britain Teachers	0–22	UK Armed Forces	8 May 2019, 8:00pm	Siddal A.R.L.F.C.
Great Britain Teachers	16–30	Great Britain Police	20 June 2019, 6:00pm	Sheffield Hallam Sports Park
UK Armed Forces	24–22	England Universities	20 June 2019, 8:00pm	Sheffield Hallam Sports Park

Pos	Team	Pld	W	D	L	PF	PA	PD	Pts
1	UK Armed Forces	3	3	0	0	84	26	+58	6
2	England Universities	3	2	0	1	90	38	+52	4
3	Great Britain Police	3	1	0	2	42	70	−28	2
4	Great Britain Teachers	3	0	0	3	24	106	−82	0

Updated to match(es) played on 6 June 2019. Source: "President's Cup". Rugby Leaguer & League Express. No. 3, 169. 15 April 2019. p. 31.

=== 2018 season ===
Fixtures & results:

Home	Score	Away	Match information
Home	Score	Away	Date and time	Venue
England Universities	48–10	Great Britain Police	18 April 2018, 7:00pm	Rochdale Mayfield
UK Armed Forces	0–24	Great Britain Teachers	Game defaulted	N/A
Great Britain Teachers	10–46	England Universities	2 May 2018, 6:00pm	Wigan St Judes
Great Britain Police	8–40	UK Armed Forces	2 May 2018, 8:00pm	Wigan St Judes
Great Britain Police	36–36	Great Britain Teachers	20 June 2018, 6:00pm	Rochdale Mayfield
England Universities	40–22	UK Armed Forces	20 June 2018, 8:00pm	Rochdale Mayfied

Pos	Team	Pld	W	D	L	PF	PA	PD	Pts
1	England Universities	3	3	0	0	134	42	+92	6
2	Great Britain Teachers	3	1	1	1	80	82	−2	3
3	UK Armed Forces	3	1	0	2	62	72	−10	2
4	Great Britain Police	3	0	1	2	54	124	−70	1

=== 2017 season ===
Competition did not take place.

=== 2016 season ===
Fixtures & results:

Home	Score	Away	Match information
Home	Score	Away	Date and time	Venue
Great Britain Armed Forces	52–18	Great Britain Police	20 April 2016, 6:00pm	Stanningley ARLFC
England Universities	32–16	Great Britain Teachers	20 April 2016, 8:00pm	Stanningley ARLFC
Great Britain Police	4–58	England Universities	11 May 2016, 6:00pm	Wigan St Patrick's
Great Britain Teachers	24–44	Great Britain Armed Forces	11 May 2016, 8:00pm	Wigan St Patrick's
Great Britain Police	36–6	Great Britain Teachers	8 June 2016, 6:00pm	Post Office Road, Featherstone
England Universities	36–26	Great Britain Armed Forces	8 June 2016, 8:00pm	Post Office Road, Featherstone

Pos	Team	Pld	W	D	L	PF	PA	PD	Pts
1	England Universities	3	3	0	0	126	46	+80	6
2	Great Britain Armed Forces	3	2	0	1	122	78	+44	4
3	Great Britain Police	3	1	0	2	58	116	−58	2
4	Great Britain Teachers	3	0	0	3	46	112	−66	0

=== 2015 season ===
Fixtures & results:

Home	Score	Away	Match information
Home	Score	Away	Date and time	Venue
England Universities	72–8	Great Britain Police	29 April 2015, 6:00pm	Stanningley ARLFC
Great Britain Armed Forces	50–6	Great Britain Teachers	29 April 205, 8:00pm	Stanningley ARLFC
Great Britain Teachers	14–36	England Universities	27 May 2015, 6:00pm	Wigan St Patrick's
Great Britain Police	28–32	Great Britain Armed Forces	27 May 2015, 8:00pm	Wigan St Patrick's
Great Britain Police	18–34	Great Britain Teachers	10 June 2015, 6:00pm	Post Office Road, Featherstone
England Universities	4–28	Great Britain Armed Forces	10 June 2015, 8:00pm	Post Office Road, Featherstone

Pos	Team	Pld	W	D	L	PF	PA	PD	Pts
1	Great Britain Armed Forces	3	3	0	0	110	38	+72	6
2	England Universities	3	2	0	1	112	50	+62	4
3	Great Britain Teachers	3	1	0	2	54	104	−50	2
4	Great Britain Police	3	0	0	3	54	138	−84	0

=== 2014 season ===
Fixtures & results:

Home	Score	Away	Match information
Home	Score	Away	Date and time	Venue
Great Britain Police	30–44	Great Britain Armed Forces	10 May 2014, 2:00pm	RAF Cranwell
Great Britain Students	52–0	Great Britain Police	4 June 2014, 6:00pm	Stanningley ARLFC
Great Britain Armed Forces	36–6	Great Britain Teachers	4 June 2014, 8:00pm	Stanningley ARLFC
Great Britain Teachers	2–52	Great Britain Students	21 June 2014,12:00	Select Security Stadium, Widnes
Great Britain Students	32–24	Great Britain Armed Forces	17 July 2014, 6:00pm	Select Security Stadium, Widnes
Great Britain Police	24–16	Great Britain Teachers	17 July 2014, 8:00pm	Select Security Stadium, Widnes

Pos	Team	Pld	W	D	L	PF	PA	PD	Pts
1	Great Britain Students	3	3	0	0	136	26	+110	6
2	Great Britain Armed Forces	3	2	0	1	104	68	+36	4
3	Great Britain Police	3	1	0	2	54	112	−58	2
4	Great Britain Teachers	3	0	0	3	24	112	−88	0

Source: "Associations Cup". Rugby Leaguer & League Express. No. 2924. 21 July 2014. p. 30.

== Women's Competition ==
=== 2022 season ===
Fixtures & results:

Home	Score	Away	Match information
Home	Score	Away	Date and time	Venue
UK Armed Forces	34-10	Great Britain Teachers	13 April 2022, 7:00pm	Saddleworth Rangers
Great Britain Teachers		England Students	11 May 2022, 7:00pm	Lock Lane
England Students		UK Armed Forces	1 June 2022, 7:00pm	Leigh Miners

Pos	Team	Pld	W	D	L	PF	PA	PD	Pts
1	Great Britain Armed Forces	0	0	0	0	0	0	0	0
2	Great Britain Teachers	0	0	0	0	0	0	0	0
3	England Students	0	0	0	0	0	0	0	0

Updated to match(es) played on unknown. Source:

=== 2016 season ===
Fixtures & results:

Home	Score	Away	Match information
Home	Score	Away	Date and time	Venue
England Students	10–16	Great Britain Teachers	22 May 2016, 1:00pm	Stanningley ARLFC
Great Britain Armed Forces	0–62	The Lionesses	22 May 2016, 3:00pm	Stanningley ARLFC
England Students	21–16	Great Britain Armed Forces	26 June 2016, 3:00pm	Wigan St Patrick's
The Lionesses	38–10	Great Britain Teachers	26 June 2016, 1:00pm	Wigan St Patrick's
Great Britain Teachers	32–14	Great Britain Armed Forces	10 July 2016, 1:00pm	Post Office Road, Featherstone
The Lionesses	36–14	England Students	10 July 2016, 3:00pm	Post Office Road, Featherstone

Pos	Team	Pld	W	D	L	PF	PA	PD	Pts
1	The Lionesses	3	3	0	0	136	24	+112	6
2	Great Britain Teachers	3	2	0	1	58	62	−4	4
3	England Students	3	1	0	2	45	68	−23	2
4	Great Britain Armed Forces	3	0	0	3	30	115	−85	0

Updated to match(es) played on unknown. Source:

=== 2015 season ===
Fixtures & results:

Home	Score	Away	Match information
Home	Score	Away	Date and time	Venue
The Lionesses	52–10	Great Britain Armed Forces	7 June 2015, 1:00pm	Stanningley ARLFC
Great Britain Teachers	14–46	England Students	7 June 2015, 3:00pm	Stanningley ARLFC
The Lionesses	36–18	Great Britain Teachers	28 June 2015, 3:00pm	Wigan St Patrick's
Great Britain Armed Forces	10–50	Great Britain Students	28 June 2015, 12:15pm	Odsal Stadium, Bradford
Great Britain Armed Forces	18–24	Great Britain Teachers	19 July 2015, 1:00pm	Post Office Road, Featherstone
England Students	20–26	The Lionesses	19 July 2015, 3:00pm	Post Office Road, Featherstone

Pos	Team	Pld	W	D	L	PF	PA	PD	Pts
1	The Lionesses	3	3	0	0	114	48	+66	6
2	England Students	3	2	0	1	116	50	+66	4
3	Great Britain Teachers	3	1	0	2	56	100	−44	2
4	Great Britain Armed Forces	3	0	0	3	38	126	−88	0

=== 2014 season ===
Fixtures & results:

Home	Score	Away	Match information
Home	Score	Away	Date and time	Venue
England Students	16–30	The Lionesses	8 June 2014, 1:00pm	Rochdale Mayfield
Great Britain Teachers	36–4	Great Britain Armed Forces	8 June 2014, 3:00pm	Rochdale Mayfield
England Students	20–20	Great Britain Teachers	21 June 2014, 2:00pm	Select Security Stadium, Widnes
Great Britain Armed Forces	4–40	The Lionesses	21 June 2014, 4:00pm	Select Security Stadium, Widnes
England Students	44–26	Great Britain Armed Forces	20 July 2014, 1:00pm	Stanningley ARLFC
Great Britain Teachers	16–32	The Lionesses	20 July 2014, 3:00pm	Stanningley ARLFC

Pos	Team	Pld	W	D	L	PF	PA	PD	Pts
1	The Lionesses	3	3	0	0	102	36	+66	6
2	Great Britain Teachers	3	1	1	1	72	56	+16	3
3	England Students	3	1	1	1	80	76	+4	3
4	Great Britain Armed Forces	3	0	0	3	34	120	−86	0

Source: "Associations Cup". Rugby Leaguer & League Express. No. 2924. 21 July 2014. p. 30.
