= President's Trophy (disambiguation) =

The Presidents' Trophy is a National Hockey League (NHL) award for the highest ranked team in the regular season.

President's Trophy or Presidents' Trophy may also refer to:

- Presidents' Trophy (U Sports), an award for best defensive player at university level in Canadian football
- President's Trophy (cricket), a tournament in Pakistan
- President's trophy (Finland), an award conferred by the Finnish Ice Hockey Federation
- President's Trophy (Canucks MVP), a former award for most valuable player (MVP) given by the Vancouver Canucks ice hockey team
- President's Trophy Boat Race, a boat race in the Indian state of Kerala
- President’s Trophy Grade-I, a cricket tournament in Pakistan
- President's Trophy Knockout Tournament, a schools rugby knockout in Sri Lanka

== See also ==
- President's Cup (disambiguation)
