= Campeonato Centroamericano =

International football tournament

Campeonato Centroamericano/Campeonato Centroamericano y Caribe
- Organiser(s): CCCF–NAFC (1959); CCCF (1961)
- Founded: 1959; 67 years ago
- Abolished: 1961; 65 years ago
- Region: Central America/North America (1959); Central America/Caribbean (1961)
- Teams: 4 or 5 (from 4 or 5 associations)
- Related competitions: CONCACAF Champions Cup
- Most championships: (Honduras) Olimpia (Costa Rica) Alajuelense (1 title each)

The Campeonato Centroamericano (English: Central American Championship), also called the Campeonato Centroamericano y Caribe (English: Central American and Caribbean Championship) was an international club competition organized by CCCF and NAFC, the two predecessor confederations of CONCACAF, as its top regional football tournament. It was the first international competition for clubs from North America, Central America and the Caribbean. The tournament was held in 1959 and 1961.

== History ==
The first tournament was held in 1959 with 4 participating clubs (3 Central American clubs and one North American club). In the second edition, the tournament changed its name to Campeonato Centroamericano y Caribe (English: Central American and Caribbean Championship), it was held in 1961 with 5 participating clubs (4 Central American clubs and one Caribbean club). In 1961, CCCF and NAFC were dissolved after merging to found CONCACAF. The CONCACAF Champions Cup was created and started in 1962.

== Qualification ==
=== 1959 ===
==== Central America ====
(El Salvador) FAS
(Costa Rica) Alajuelense
(Honduras) Olimpia

==== North America ====
(Mexico) Guadalajara

=== 1961 ===
==== Central America ====
(El Salvador) Águila
(Costa Rica) Alajuelense
(Guatemala) Comunicaciones
(Honduras) Olimpia

==== Caribbean ====
(Netherlands Antilles) Jong Holland

== Results ==
Only 2 editions of the tournament were held (1959 and 1961).

Edition	Champions	Results	Runners-up
1959	(Honduras) Olimpia	Round-Robin	(Mexico) Guadalajara
1961	(Costa Rica) Alajuelense	1–1; 2–1	(Netherlands Antilles) Jong Holland

== Performances ==
Performance by club
Club	Titles	Runners-up	Winning editions	Runners-up editions
(Honduras) Olimpia	1	0	1959	–
(Costa Rica) Alajuelense	1	0	1961	–
(Mexico) Guadalajara	0	1	–	1959
(Netherlands Antilles) Jong Holland	0	1	–	1961

Performance by nation
Rank	Nation	Best result	Best club (Edition)
1	Honduras	Champions	Olimpia (1959)
1	Costa Rica	Champions	Alajuelense (1961)
3	Mexico	Runners-up	Guadalajara (1959)
3	Netherlands Antilles	Runners-up	Jong Holland (1961)
5	El Salvador	Third place	Águila (1961)
6	Guatemala	Fourth place	Comunicaciones (1961)

== See also ==
- CCCF
- NAFC
- CONCACAF
- CONCACAF Champions Cup
