= Dr. Fazıl Küçük Kupası =

Dr. Fazıl Küçük Kupası is an annual tournament organized by the Cyprus Turkish Football Federation in Northern Cyprus.

== Winners ==
- 1989: Baf Ülkü Yurdu 2–1 Doğan Türk Birliği
- 1990: Doğan Türk Birliği 3–1 Türk Ocağı Limasol
- 1991: Baf Ülkü Yurdu 3–1 Çetinkaya
- 1992: Çetinkaya 2–1 Gönyeli
- 1993: Çetinkaya 3–2 Doğan Türk Birliği
- 1994: Gönyeli 2–0 Yalova
- 1995: Gönyeli 2–1 Yalova
- 1996: Çetinkaya 3–2 Akıncılar
- 1997: Küçük Kaymaklı 2–0 Gönyeli
- 1998: Çetinkaya 3–2 Küçük Kaymaklı
- 1999: Gönyeli 3–1 Çetinkaya
- 2000: Çetinkaya 3–0 Gönyeli
- 2001: Küçük Kaymaklı 2–1 Çetinkaya

== Titles by Clubs ==
| Team | Titles | Winning years |
|---|---|---|
| Çetinkaya | 5 | 1992, 1993, 1996, 1998, 2000 |
| Gönyeli | 3 | 1994, 1995, 1999 |
| Baf Ülkü Yurdu | 2 | 1989, 1991 |
| Küçük Kaymaklı | 2 | 1997, 2001 |
| Doğan Türk Birliği | 1 | 1990 |
