= Başbakanlık Kupası (Northern Cyprus) =

Başbakanlık Kupası (Prime Minister's Cup) is the tournament of the Cyprus Turkish Football Federation, Turkish Republic of Northern Cyprus.

== Winners ==
- 1981: Gençler Birliği 3–1 Vadili Türk Çiftçiler Birliği
- 1982: Ortaköy SK 3–2 Ağırdağ Boğaz
- 1983: Yenicami Ağdelen 3–0 İnönü
- 1984: Binatlı Yılmaz (6–5 p) Beyarmudu Türk Çiftçiler Birliği
- 1985: Alsancak Yeşilova SK (5–4 p) Ergazi
- 1986: Ağırdağ Boğaz TSK (5–3 p) Doğan Türk Birliği
- 1987: Pile TSK 3–1 Yalova
- 1988: Akıncılar GSK 2–0 Vadili Türk Çiftçiler Birliği
- 1989: Doğan Türk Birliği 1–0 Mağusa Türk Gücü
- 1990: Doğan Türk Birliği 1–0 Çetinkaya
- 1991: Baf Ülkü Yurdu 5–3 Küçük Kaymaklı
- 1992: Gönyeli (4–2 p) Binatlı Yılmaz
- 1993: Doğan Türk Birliği 3–1 Gençlik Gücü
- 1994: Gönyeli 4–1 Gaziveren
- 1995: Yalova SK 3–0 Girne Halk Evi
- 1996: Akıncılar GSK 2–1 Gönyeli
- 1997: Gönyeli 15–2 Dumlupınar
- 1998: Küçük Kaymaklı 2–1 Çetinkaya
- 1999: Gönyeli 4–0 Küçük Kaymaklı
- 2000
- 2001: Küçük Kaymaklı 6–1 Esentepe

== Titles by Clubs ==
Team	Titles	Winning years
Gönyeli	4	1992, 1994, 1997, 1999
Doğan Türk Birliği	3	1989, 1990, 1993
Akıncılar GSK	2	1988, 1996
Küçük Kaymaklı	2	1998, 2001
Gençler Birliği	1	1981
Ortaköy SK	1	1982
Yenicami Ağdelen	1	1983
Binatlı Yılmaz	1	1984
Alsancak Yeşilova SK	1	1985
Ağırdağ Boğaz TSK	1	1986
Pile TSK	1	1987
Baf Ülkü Yurdu	1	1991
Yalova SK	1	1995
