= President's Cup =

President's Cup may refer to:

== Association football ==
- AFC President's Cup, a competition between domestic clubs of Asia
- FKF President's Cup, the top knockout tournament of Kenya
- Indonesia President's Cup, a pre-season tournament in Indonesia
- Korea Cup, an international tournament of South Korea
- LFA President's Cup, a competition organised by the Leinster Football Association, Ireland
- Malaysian President's Cup, a developmental competition for under-21 players in Malaysia
- Northern Premier League President's Cup, between teams from Northern Premier League Division One North and South in England
- OFC President's Cup, a competition organized by the Oceania Football Confederation
- President of Ireland's Cup, a competition organised by the Football Association of Ireland
- President's Cup (Ghana), an annual match between two Ghana Premier League clubs
- President's Cup (Maldives), between the top four teams of Dhivehi Premier League
- Singapore Cup, formerly known as the President's Cup in Singapore
- Suriname President's Cup, a super cup competition organized by the Surinamese Football Association
- Turkish Super Cup, an annual match between the Süper Lig and Turkish Cup winners
- UAE President's Cup, a tournament in the United Arab Emirates

== Ice hockey ==
- Ed Chynoweth Cup, awarded annually to the champion of the Western Hockey League, originally known as the President's Cup
- Gilles-Courteau Trophy, awarded annually to the champion of the Quebec Major Junior Hockey League, originally known as the President's Cup
- President's Cup (SPHL), awarded to the playoff champions of the Southern Professional Hockey League
- Ray Miron President's Cup, the championship trophy of the Central Hockey League

== Rugby league ==
- Presidents Cup (rugby league), a rugby league competition in Australia since 1910
- RFL President's Cup. a rugby league competition in the United Kingdom since 2014

== Tennis ==
- ATP Tashkent Open, part of the ATP Tour between 1997 and 2002 in Tashkent, Uzbekistan
- President's Cup (tennis), part of the ATP Challenger Tour in Astana, Kazakhstan

== Other sports ==
- President's Cup (chess), the United States Chess Federation collegiate championship
- President's Cup (rivalry), an American college football rivalry between the University of Central Oklahoma, and Northeastern State University
- President's Cup (West Indies Cricket), a cricket competition in the West Indies for the 1997–98 season#
- Presidents Cup (box lacrosse), the National Senior level box lacrosse championship for the Canadian Lacrosse Association
- Presidents Cup a series of men's golf matches between the United States and the rest of the world except Europe, held biennially
- Turkish Basketball President's Cup, the professional men's club super cup competition that takes place each pre season in Turkey

== See also ==
- President's Trophy (disambiguation)
- Presidential Cup Bowl, a postseason American college football bowl game
