= Confederación Centroamericana y del Caribe de Fútbol =

International governing body of association football

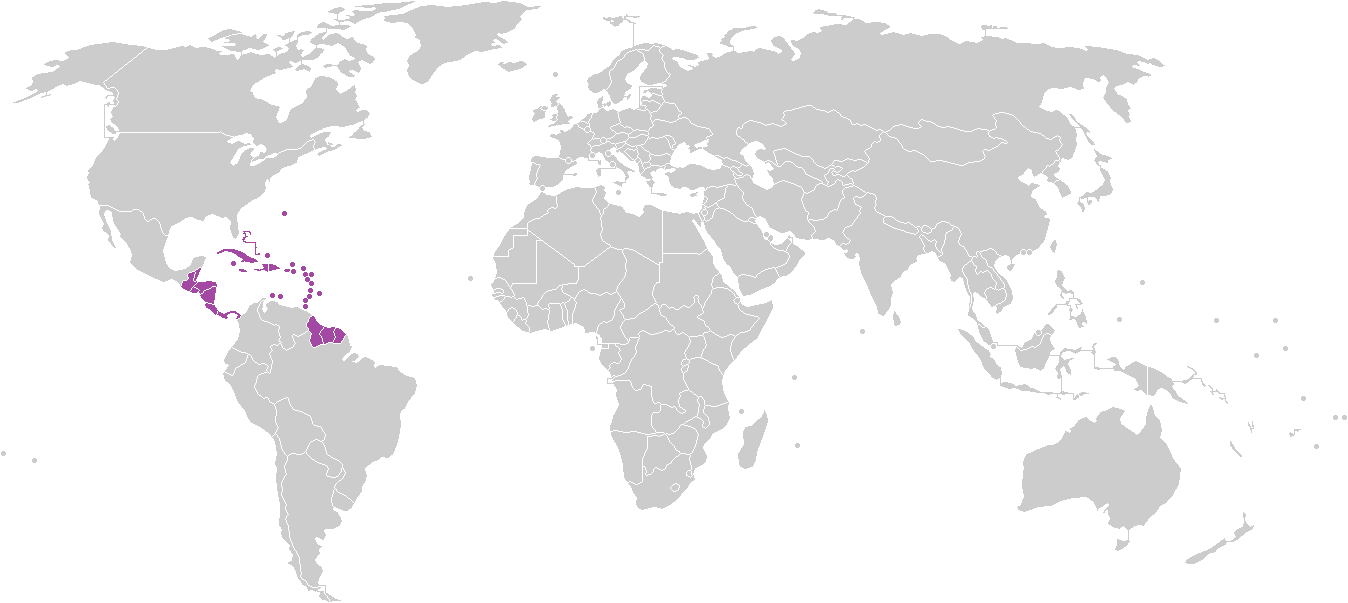
- Abbreviation: CCCF
- Successor: CONCACAF
- Formation: 1938; 88 years ago
- Founded at: Panama City, Panama
- Dissolved: 1961; 65 years ago
- Type: Association football governing body
- Region served: Central America; Caribbean; Suriname
- Members: 11 associations
- Official language: Spanish; Dutch; French
- Affiliations: FIFA

The Confederación Centroamericana y del Caribe de Fútbol (English: Central American and Caribbean Football Confederation, Dutch: Voetbalconfederatie van Centraal-Amerika en het Caribisch gebied, French: Confédération de football d'Amérique centrale et des Caraïbes), abbreviated as CCCF, was the regional governing body of association football in Central America and the Caribbean from 1938 to 1961, and a predecessor confederation of CONCACAF. Founded in 1938 in Panama City, under the first elected president Héctor Beeche. CCCF and NAFC merged to form CONCACAF in 1961.

== Member associations ==
- Costa Rica
- Cuba (1955–1961)
- Curaçao / Netherlands Antilles
- El Salvador
- Guatemala
- Haiti
- Honduras
- Nicaragua
- Panama
- Suriname
- (Netherlands) Aruba

== Competitions ==
The CCCF organized three official competitions; one for senior national teams, one for youth national teams and one for clubs.

- CCCF Championship (1941–1961)
- CCCF Youth Championship (1954–1960)
- Championship of Central America and Mexico / Championship of Central America and Caribbean (1959 and 1961)

== See also ==
- NAFC
- CONCACAF
- NAFU
- UNCAF
- CFU
