= 2009 FIFA U-17 World Cup squads =

Names in bold went on to earn full international caps.

== Group A ==
=== Nigeria ===
Head coach: (Nigeria) John Obuh

| No. | Pos. | Player | Date of birth (age) | Caps | Club |
|---|---|---|---|---|---|
| 1 | GK | Dami Paul | 18 December 1992 (aged 16) | | (Nigeria) Ousford Academy |
| 2 | DF | Aigbe Oliha | 11 February 1993 (aged 16) | | (Nigeria) Igbino Babes |
| 3 | DF | Mohammed Goyi Aliyu | 12 February 1993 (aged 16) | | (Nigeria) Niger Tornadoes |
| 4 | MF | **Ogenyi Onazi** | 25 December 1992 (aged 16) | | (Nigeria) My People |
| 5 | DF | Fortune Chukwudi (c) | 18 November 1992 (aged 16) | | (Nigeria) A & B Academy |
| 6 | DF | **Kenneth Omeruo** | 17 October 1993 (aged 16) | | (Nigeria) Hard Foundation |
| 7 | MF | George White Agwuocha | 13 January 1993 (aged 16) | | (Nigeria) Kwara United |
| 8 | FW | **Stanley Okoro** | 8 December 1992 (aged 16) | | (Nigeria) Heartland |
| 9 | MF | Abdul Jeleel Ajagun | 10 February 1993 (aged 16) | | (Nigeria) Dolphins |
| 10 | FW | **Olarenwaju Kayode** | 8 May 1993 (aged 16) | | (Nigeria) Marvellous |
| 11 | FW | Terry Envoh | 12 December 1992 (aged 16) | | (Nigeria) Mighty Jets |
| 12 | DF | Chukwujike Mgbam | 22 April 1992 (aged 17) | | (Nigeria) Standard Academy |
| 13 | FW | Omoh Ojabu | 14 December 1992 (aged 16) | | (Nigeria) Dolphins |
| 14 | FW | Sani Emmanuel | 23 December 1992 (aged 16) | | (Nigeria) My People |
| 15 | FW | Yusuf Otubanjo | 12 September 1992 (aged 17) | | (Nigeria) Emmanuel Amuneke Academy |
| 16 | GK | Amos Izuchukwu | 9 December 1993 (aged 15) | | (Nigeria) Team Lagos |
| 17 | MF | Obinna Okoro | 30 December 1992 (aged 16) | | (Nigeria) Young Stars |
| 18 | FW | Edafe Egbedi | 5 August 1993 (aged 16) | | (Nigeria) Gizallo |
| 19 | MF | Deji Joel | 23 November 1992 (aged 16) | | (Nigeria) Eco Academy |
| 20 | MF | **Ramon Azeez** | 12 December 1992 (aged 16) | | (Nigeria) DHSA |
| 21 | GK | John Felagha | 27 July 1994 (aged 15) | | (Qatar) ASPIRE |

=== Germany ===
Head coach: (Germany) Marco Pezzaiuoli

| No. | Pos. | Player | Date of birth (age) | Caps | Club |
|---|---|---|---|---|---|
| 1 | GK | **Marc-André ter Stegen** | 30 April 1992 (aged 17) | | (Germany) Borussia Mönchengladbach |
| 2 | DF | Bienvenue Basala-Mazana | 2 January 1992 (aged 17) | | (Germany) 1. FC Köln |
| 3 | DF | **Marvin Plattenhardt** | 26 January 1992 (aged 17) | | (Germany) 1. FC Nürnberg |
| 4 | DF | Robert Labus | 10 October 1992 (aged 17) | | (Germany) Hamburger SV |
| 5 | DF | **Shkodran Mustafi** | 17 April 1992 (aged 17) | | (England) Everton |
| 6 | DF | Gerrit Nauber | 13 April 1992 (aged 17) | | (Germany) Bayer Leverkusen |
| 7 | MF | Christopher Buchtmann | 25 April 1992 (aged 17) | | (England) Liverpool |
| 8 | MF | Reinhold Yabo (c) | 10 February 1992 (aged 17) | | (Germany) 1. FC Köln |
| 9 | FW | Lennart Thy | 25 February 1992 (aged 17) | | (Germany) Werder Bremen |
| 10 | MF | **Mario Götze** | 3 June 1992 (aged 17) | | (Germany) Borussia Dortmund |
| 11 | FW | **Abu-Bakarr Kargbo** | 21 December 1992 (aged 16) | | (Germany) Hertha BSC |
| 12 | GK | **Bernd Leno** | 4 March 1992 (aged 17) | | (Germany) VfB Stuttgart |
| 13 | DF | Daniel Hofstetter | 4 July 1992 (aged 17) | | (Germany) 1860 Munich |
| 14 | MF | **Yunus Mallı** | 24 February 1992 (aged 17) | | (Germany) Borussia Mönchengladbach |
| 15 | DF | Christopher Avevor | 11 February 1992 (aged 17) | | (Germany) Hannover 96 |
| 16 | FW | **Kevin Volland** | 30 July 1992 (aged 17) | | (Germany) 1860 Munich |
| 17 | MF | Manuel Janzer | 7 March 1992 (aged 17) | | (Germany) VfB Stuttgart |
| 18 | MF | Matthias Zimmermann | 16 June 1992 (aged 17) | | (Germany) Karlsruher SC |
| 19 | MF | Florian Trinks | 11 March 1992 (aged 17) | | (Germany) Werder Bremen |
| 20 | FW | Kevin Scheidhauer | 13 March 1992 (aged 17) | | (Germany) VfL Wolfsburg |
| 21 | GK | Jonas Ermes | 2 April 1992 (aged 17) | | (Germany) VfL Bochum |

=== Honduras ===
Head coach: (Honduras) Emilio Umanzor

| No. | Pos. | Player | Date of birth (age) | Caps | Club |
|---|---|---|---|---|---|
| 1 | GK | Allan Angelino | 3 May 1992 (aged 17) | | Unattached |
| 2 | DF | Franklyn Amaya | 21 January 1992 (aged 17) | | Unattached |
| 3 | DF | Jhony Rivera | 27 April 1992 (aged 17) | | (Honduras) Real España |
| 4 | DF | **Éver Alvarado** | 30 January 1992 (aged 17) | | (Honduras) Olimpia |
| 5 | DF | Sammyr Martínez | 3 March 1992 (aged 17) | | (Honduras) Olimpia |
| 6 | MF | Ray Salgado | 6 August 1992 (aged 17) | | Unattached |
| 7 | MF | **Wilmer Fuentes** | 21 April 1992 (aged 17) | | (Honduras) Marathón |
| 8 | DF | Roberto López | 15 April 1992 (aged 17) | | (Honduras) Motagua |
| 9 | FW | Héctor Matute | 5 April 1992 (aged 17) | | (Honduras) Real Juventud |
| 10 | MF | Luís Berrios | 15 May 1992 (aged 17) | | (Honduras) Marathón |
| 11 | FW | **Anthony Lozano (c)** | 25 April 1993 (aged 16) | | (Honduras) Olimpia |
| 12 | GK | **Harold Fonseca** | 8 October 1993 (aged 16) | | (Honduras) Motagua |
| 13 | DF | José Tobías | 20 January 1992 (aged 17) | | (Honduras) Real España |
| 14 | MF | Óscar Padilla | 18 June 1992 (aged 17) | | Unattached |
| 15 | FW | David Carranza | 8 December 1994 (aged 14) | | (Honduras) Motagua |
| 16 | MF | Jair Aragón | 26 October 1992 (aged 16) | | (Honduras) Real Juventud |
| 17 | MF | **Alexander López** | 5 June 1992 (aged 17) | | (Honduras) Olimpia |
| 18 | MF | Néstor Martínez | 4 May 1992 (aged 17) | | (Honduras) Olimpia |
| 19 | MF | Carlos Baires | 25 December 1992 (aged 16) | | (Honduras) Hispano |
| 20 | DF | Allan Rivas | 6 January 1992 (aged 17) | | (Honduras) Olimpia |
| 21 | GK | Alejandro Rivera | 26 June 1993 (aged 16) | | (Honduras) Olimpia Occidental |

=== Argentina ===
Head coach: (Argentina) José Luís Brown

| No. | Pos. | Player | Date of birth (age) | Caps | Club |
|---|---|---|---|---|---|
| 1 | GK | **Emiliano Martínez** | 2 September 1992 (aged 17) | | (Argentina) Independiente |
| 2 | DF | Leandro González Pírez | 26 February 1992 (aged 17) | | (Argentina) River Plate |
| 3 | DF | Lucas Kruspzky | 6 April 1992 (aged 17) | | (Argentina) Independiente |
| 4 | DF | Leandro Marín | 22 January 1992 (aged 17) | | (Argentina) Boca Juniors |
| 5 | MF | Jorge Balbuena | 28 February 1992 (aged 17) | | (Argentina) Lanús |
| 6 | DF | Esteban Espíndola (c) | 22 March 1992 (aged 17) | | (Argentina) River Plate |
| 7 | MF | Ezequiel Cirigliano | 24 January 1992 (aged 17) | | (Argentina) River Plate |
| 8 | MF | Franco Bitancourt | 17 February 1992 (aged 17) | | (Argentina) River Plate |
| 9 | FW | Daniel Villalva | 6 July 1992 (aged 17) | | (Argentina) River Plate |
| 10 | MF | Sebastián González | 4 March 1992 (aged 17) | | (Argentina) San Lorenzo |
| 11 | FW | Sergio Araujo | 28 January 1992 (aged 17) | | (Argentina) Boca Juniors |
| 12 | GK | Ignacio Arce | 8 April 1992 (aged 17) | | (Argentina) Unión de Santa Fe |
| 13 | DF | **Nicolás Tagliafico** | 31 August 1992 (aged 17) | | (Argentina) Banfield |
| 14 | DF | Federico Rasmussen | 4 March 1992 (aged 17) | | (Argentina) Lanús |
| 15 | MF | Esteban Orfano | 13 January 1992 (aged 17) | | (Argentina) Boca Juniors |
| 16 | MF | Facundo Quignon | 2 May 1993 (aged 16) | | (Argentina) River Plate |
| 17 | FW | Guido Dal Casón | 4 March 1993 (aged 16) | | (Argentina) Quilmes |
| 18 | MF | Gonzalo Olid Apaza | 5 March 1992 (aged 17) | | (Argentina) River Plate |
| 19 | MF | Matías Sosa | 26 February 1992 (aged 17) | | (Argentina) Estudiantes |
| 20 | FW | Eduardo Rotondi | 29 January 1992 (aged 17) | | (Argentina) Argentinos Juniors |
| 21 | GK | Joaquín Pucheta | 9 June 1992 (aged 17) | | (Argentina) Lanús |

== Group B ==
=== Brazil ===
Head coach: (Brazil) Lucho Nizzo

| No. | Pos. | Player | Date of birth (age) | Caps | Club |
|---|---|---|---|---|---|
| 1 | GK | **Alisson** | 2 October 1992 (aged 17) | | (Brazil) Internacional |
| 2 | DF | Crystian | 10 June 1992 (aged 17) | | (Brazil) Santos |
| 3 | DF | Gerson (c) | 4 October 1992 (aged 17) | | (Brazil) Grêmio |
| 4 | DF | Romário Leiria | 28 June 1992 (aged 17) | | (Brazil) Internacional |
| 5 | MF | Elivelton | 21 January 1992 (aged 17) | | (Brazil) Santos |
| 6 | DF | Dodô | 6 February 1992 (aged 17) | | (Brazil) Corinthians |
| 7 | MF | **João Pedro** | 9 March 1992 (aged 17) | | (Brazil) Atlético Mineiro |
| 8 | MF | **Wellington Nem** | 6 February 1992 (aged 17) | | (Brazil) Fluminense |
| 9 | FW | Zezinho | 14 March 1992 (aged 17) | | (Brazil) Juventude |
| 10 | MF | **Philippe Coutinho** | 12 June 1992 (aged 17) | | (Brazil) Vasco da Gama |
| 11 | FW | **Neymar** | 5 February 1992 (aged 17) | | (Brazil) Santos |
| 12 | GK | Luis Guilherme | 4 June 1992 (aged 17) | | (Brazil) Botafogo |
| 13 | DF | Romário | 18 December 1993 (aged 15) | | (Brazil) Vitória |
| 14 | MF | Guilherme | 2 May 1992 (aged 17) | | (Brazil) Atlético Paranaense |
| 15 | DF | Sidimar | 9 July 1992 (aged 17) | | (Brazil) Atlético Mineiro |
| 16 | MF | **Casemiro** | 23 February 1992 (aged 17) | | (Brazil) São Paulo |
| 17 | FW | Giovani | 7 January 1992 (aged 17) | | (Brazil) Internacional |
| 18 | FW | Willen | 10 January 1992 (aged 17) | | (Brazil) Vasco da Gama |
| 19 | FW | Felipinho | 29 January 1992 (aged 17) | | (Brazil) Internacional |
| 20 | FW | Wellington Silva | 6 January 1993 (aged 16) | | (Brazil) Fluminense |
| 21 | GK | André | 6 February 1992 (aged 17) | | (Brazil) Corinthians |

=== Japan ===
Head coach: (Japan) Yutaka Ikeuchi

| No. | Pos. | Player | Date of birth (age) | Caps | Club |
|---|---|---|---|---|---|
| 1 | GK | Jun Kamita | 17 January 1992 (aged 17) | | (Japan) Vissel Kobe |
| 2 | DF | Takuya Okamoto | 18 June 1992 (aged 17) | | (Japan) Urawa Red Diamonds |
| 3 | DF | Yuma Hiroki | 23 July 1992 (aged 17) | | (Japan) FC Tokyo |
| 4 | MF | **Ken Matsubara** | 16 February 1993 (aged 16) | | (Japan) Oita Trinita |
| 5 | DF | Tatsuya Uchida (c) | 8 February 1992 (aged 17) | | (Japan) Gamba Osaka |
| 6 | MF | Koji Takano | 23 December 1992 (aged 16) | | (Japan) Tokyo Verdy |
| 7 | FW | **Takashi Usami** | 6 May 1992 (aged 17) | | (Japan) Gamba Osaka |
| 8 | FW | Takumi Miyayoshi | 8 July 1992 (aged 17) | | (Japan) Kyoto Sanga |
| 9 | FW | **Kenyu Sugimoto** | 18 November 1992 (aged 16) | | (Japan) Cerezo Osaka |
| 10 | MF | **Gaku Shibasaki** | 28 May 1992 (aged 17) | | (Japan) Aomori Yamada High School |
| 11 | MF | Yoshiaki Takagi | 9 December 1992 (aged 16) | | (Japan) Tokyo Verdy |
| 12 | DF | Ryuki Nakajima | 12 January 1992 (aged 17) | | (Japan) Aomori Yamada High School |
| 13 | MF | Yuki Horigome | 13 December 1992 (aged 16) | | (Japan) Ventforet Kofu |
| 14 | MF | Shuto Kojima | 30 July 1992 (aged 17) | | (Japan) Maebashi Ikuei High School |
| 15 | DF | Ryosuke Tada | 7 August 1992 (aged 17) | | (Japan) Cerezo Osaka |
| 16 | FW | Keijiro Ogawa | 14 July 1992 (aged 17) | | (Japan) Vissel Kobe |
| 17 | FW | Keisuke Kanda | 29 January 1992 (aged 17) | | (Japan) Kashima Antlers |
| 18 | GK | Yasuhiro Watanabe | 4 October 1992 (aged 17) | | (Japan) Albirex Niigata |
| 19 | MF | Shuto Kono | 4 May 1993 (aged 16) | | (Japan) JFA Academy Fukushima |
| 20 | FW | **Ryo Miyaichi** | 14 December 1992 (aged 16) | | (Japan) Chukyo University Chukyo High School |
| 21 | GK | Koki Matsuzawa | 3 April 1992 (aged 17) | | (Japan) Ryutsu Keizai University High School |

=== Mexico ===
Head coach: (Mexico) José Luis González China

| No. | Pos. | Player | Date of birth (age) | Caps | Club |
|---|---|---|---|---|---|
| 1 | GK | **José Antonio Rodríguez** | 4 July 1992 (aged 17) | | (Mexico) Guadalajara |
| 2 | DF | César Ibáñez | 1 April 1992 (aged 17) | | (Mexico) Atlas |
| 3 | DF | Kristian Álvarez (c) | 20 April 1992 (aged 17) | | (Mexico) Guadalajara |
| 4 | DF | Jairo González | 27 February 1992 (aged 17) | | (Mexico) Guadalajara |
| 5 | DF | Óscar García | 8 February 1993 (aged 16) | | (Mexico) Monterrey |
| 6 | MF | Miguel Basulto | 7 January 1992 (aged 17) | | (Mexico) Guadalajara |
| 7 | DF | Abraham Coronado | 28 February 1992 (aged 17) | | (Mexico) Guadalajara |
| 8 | MF | Carlos Campos | 13 April 1992 (aged 17) | | (Mexico) UNAM |
| 9 | FW | Daniel Guzmán Jr. | 28 June 1992 (aged 17) | | (Mexico) Tigres |
| 10 | FW | Víctor Mañón | 6 February 1992 (aged 17) | | (Mexico) Pachuca |
| 11 | MF | Gil Cordero | 13 April 1992 (aged 17) | | (Mexico) Necaxa |
| 12 | GK | Israel Cano | 17 September 1992 (aged 17) | | (Mexico) Monterrey |
| 13 | MF | Bryan Leyva | 8 February 1992 (aged 17) | | (United States) FC Dallas |
| 14 | MF | Christian Ortega | 25 February 1992 (aged 17) | | (Mexico) Real Leonés |
| 15 | FW | Luis Madrigal | 10 February 1993 (aged 16) | | (Mexico) Monterrey |
| 16 | FW | Carlos Parra | 30 March 1992 (aged 17) | | (Mexico) Santos Laguna |
| 17 | DF | Érik Vera | 24 March 1992 (aged 17) | | (Mexico) UNAM |
| 18 | DF | **Diego Reyes** | 19 September 1992 (aged 17) | | (Mexico) América |
| 19 | MF | Martín Ponce | 13 June 1992 (aged 17) | | (Mexico) Guadalajara |
| 20 | MF | Luis Télles | 9 March 1992 (aged 17) | | (Mexico) Atlas |
| 21 | GK | José Alujas | 9 April 1992 (aged 17) | | (Mexico) Atlas |

=== Switzerland ===
Head coach: (Switzerland) Dany Ryser

| No. | Pos. | Player | Date of birth (age) | Caps | Club |
|---|---|---|---|---|---|
| 1 | GK | Benjamin Siegrist | 31 January 1992 (aged 17) | | (England) Aston Villa |
| 2 | DF | André Gonçalves | 23 January 1992 (aged 17) | | (Switzerland) Zürich |
| 3 | DF | Janick Kamber | 26 February 1992 (aged 17) | | (Switzerland) Basel |
| 4 | MF | **Charyl Chappuis** | 12 January 1992 (aged 17) | | (Switzerland) Grasshopper |
| 5 | DF | **Freddie Veseli (c)** | 20 November 1992 (aged 16) | | (England) Manchester City |
| 6 | MF | Kofi Nimeley | 11 December 1992 (aged 16) | | (Switzerland) Basel |
| 7 | MF | Roman Buess | 21 September 1992 (aged 17) | | (Switzerland) Basel |
| 8 | MF | Oliver Buff | 3 August 1992 (aged 17) | | (Switzerland) Zürich |
| 9 | FW | **Haris Seferovic** | 22 February 1992 (aged 17) | | (Switzerland) Grasshopper |
| 10 | FW | **Nassim Ben Khalifa** | 13 January 1992 (aged 17) | | (Switzerland) Grasshopper |
| 11 | MF | **Granit Xhaka** | 27 September 1992 (aged 17) | | (Switzerland) Basel |
| 12 | GK | Raphael Spiegel | 19 December 1992 (aged 16) | | (Switzerland) Grasshopper |
| 13 | DF | **Ricardo Rodriguez** | 25 August 1992 (aged 17) | | (Switzerland) Zürich |
| 14 | DF | Bruno Martignoni | 13 December 1992 (aged 16) | | (Switzerland) Locarno |
| 15 | DF | Sead Hajrović | 4 June 1993 (aged 16) | | (England) Arsenal |
| 16 | MF | **Pajtim Kasami** | 2 June 1992 (aged 17) | | (Italy) Lazio |
| 17 | MF | Maik Nakić | 17 January 1992 (aged 17) | | (Switzerland) Sion |
| 18 | DF | Robin Vecchi | 3 January 1992 (aged 17) | | (Switzerland) Basel |
| 19 | FW | Matteo Tosetti | 15 February 1992 (aged 17) | | (Switzerland) Locarno |
| 20 | FW | Igor Mijatović | 21 November 1992 (aged 16) | | (Switzerland) Bellinzona |
| 21 | GK | **Joël Kiassumbua** | 6 April 1992 (aged 17) | | (Switzerland) Luzern |

== Group C ==
=== Iran ===
Head coach: (Iran) Ali Doustimehr

| No. | Pos. | Player | Date of birth (age) | Caps | Club |
|---|---|---|---|---|---|
| 1 | GK | Iman Sadeghi | 9 January 1992 (aged 17) | | (Iran) Esteghlal |
| 2 | DF | **Omid Alishah** | 1 October 1992 (aged 17) | | (Iran) Sanaye Talaei |
| 3 | DF | Bahman Maleki | 11 February 1992 (aged 17) | | (Iran) Zob Ahan |
| 4 | DF | Iman Shirazi | 11 March 1992 (aged 17) | | (Iran) Zob Ahan |
| 5 | DF | Ali Goudarzi | 8 March 1992 (aged 17) | | (Iran) Zob Ahan |
| 6 | FW | Mehran Golbarg | 21 January 1992 (aged 17) | | (Iran) Damash |
| 7 | MF | Ali Heidari | 21 April 1992 (aged 17) | | (Iran) Foolad |
| 8 | MF | **Akbar Imani** | 21 March 1992 (aged 17) | | (Iran) Sepahan |
| 9 | FW | **Kaveh Rezaei** | 5 April 1992 (aged 17) | | (Iran) Foolad |
| 10 | MF | Afshin Esmaeilzadeh | 21 April 1992 (aged 17) | | (Iran) Damash |
| 11 | FW | **Payam Sadeghian (c)** | 28 February 1992 (aged 17) | | (Iran) Zob Ahan |
| 12 | GK | Hadi Rishi | 19 February 1992 (aged 17) | | (Iran) Sepahan |
| 13 | MF | Mehrdad Yeghaneh | 22 January 1992 (aged 17) | | (Iran) Tractor Sazi |
| 14 | DF | Hamid Amali | 17 September 1992 (aged 17) | | (Iran) Rah Ahan |
| 15 | DF | Saeid Lotfi | 16 July 1992 (aged 17) | | (Iran) Sepahan |
| 16 | FW | Reza Ghiali | 9 July 1992 (aged 17) | | (Iran) Foolad |
| 17 | DF | Hossein Gohari | 8 February 1992 (aged 17) | | (Iran) Damash |
| 18 | MF | Saeid Ghadami | 3 April 1992 (aged 17) | | (Iran) Foolad |
| 19 | FW | Milad Gharibi | 20 February 1992 (aged 17) | | Unattached |
| 20 | MF | **Morteza Pouraliganji** | 21 April 1992 (aged 17) | | Unattached |
| 21 | GK | **Hossein Hosseini** | 30 June 1992 (aged 17) | | (Iran) Bargh |

=== Gambia ===
Head coach: (Egypt) Tariq Saigy

| No. | Pos. | Player | Date of birth (age) | Caps | Club |
|---|---|---|---|---|---|
| 1 | GK | Ousman Darboe | 18 November 1992 (aged 16) | | (The Gambia) Africell |
| 2 | DF | Lamin Sarjo Samateh | 20 December 1993 (aged 15) | | (The Gambia) Samger |
| 3 | MF | Dawda Ceesay | 25 January 1993 (aged 16) | | (The Gambia) Banjul Hawks |
| 4 | DF | **Lamin Samateh** | 26 June 1992 (aged 17) | | (The Gambia) Steve Biko |
| 5 | MF | Pateh Nyang | 14 March 1992 (aged 17) | | (The Gambia) Seaview |
| 6 | MF | **Baboucarr Savage** | 7 June 1992 (aged 17) | | (The Gambia) Armed Forces |
| 7 | MF | Demba Janneh | 26 September 1994 (aged 15) | | (The Gambia) Steve Biko |
| 8 | MF | Sanusi Jabbi | 23 May 1993 (aged 16) | | (The Gambia) GAMTEL |
| 9 | DF | Bakary Sanyang | 7 December 1994 (aged 14) | | (The Gambia) Lamin United |
| 10 | MF | Alieu Darbo | 3 August 1992 (aged 17) | | (France) Le Mans |
| 11 | MF | Kissima Bojang | 16 June 1992 (aged 17) | | (The Gambia) Samger |
| 12 | DF | Kemo Fatty | 14 June 1992 (aged 17) | | (The Gambia) Seaview |
| 13 | GK | Baka Ceesay | 2 February 1994 (aged 15) | | (The Gambia) GAMTEL |
| 14 | FW | Buba Jallow | 23 February 1994 (aged 15) | | (The Gambia) Samger |
| 15 | DF | Ismaila Suwaneh | 27 September 1994 (aged 15) | | (The Gambia) Gambia Ports Authority |
| 16 | FW | Ebrima Bojang (c) | 2 March 1992 (aged 17) | | (Senegal) Yeggo |
| 17 | DF | Lamin Gibba | 26 April 1994 (aged 15) | | (The Gambia) Wallidan |
| 18 | MF | Omar Bojang | 5 August 1995 (aged 14) | | (The Gambia) Africell |
| 19 | DF | Saikou Jawneh | 8 April 1993 (aged 16) | | (The Gambia) Bakau United |
| 20 | FW | Buba Sama | 20 January 1992 (aged 17) | | (The Gambia) Armed Forces |
| 21 | GK | Ebrima Saho | 22 July 1994 (aged 15) | | (The Gambia) Africell |

=== Colombia ===
Head coach: (Colombia) Ramiro Viafara

| No. | Pos. | Player | Date of birth (age) | Caps | Club |
|---|---|---|---|---|---|
| 1 | GK | Cristian Bonilla | 20 June 1993 (aged 16) | | (Colombia) Boyacá Chicó |
| 2 | MF | Daniel Santa | 7 June 1992 (aged 17) | | (Colombia) Atlético Nacional |
| 3 | DF | **Stefan Medina** | 14 June 1992 (aged 17) | | (Colombia) Atlético Nacional |
| 4 | MF | Jhojan Caicedo | 30 September 1992 (aged 17) | | (Colombia) Boyacá Chicó |
| 5 | DF | Juan Camilo Saiz (c) | 1 March 1992 (aged 17) | | (Colombia) Envigado |
| 6 | DF | Héctor Quiñones | 17 March 1992 (aged 17) | | (Colombia) Deportivo Cali |
| 7 | FW | **Fabián Castillo** | 17 June 1992 (aged 17) | | (Colombia) Deportivo Cali |
| 8 | MF | **Gustavo Cuéllar** | 14 October 1992 (aged 17) | | (Colombia) Deportivo Cali |
| 9 | MF | Daniel Cataño | 17 January 1992 (aged 17) | | (Colombia) Deportivo Rionegro |
| 10 | FW | Jean Blanco | 6 April 1992 (aged 17) | | (Colombia) Cúcuta Deportivo |
| 11 | FW | Wilson Cuero | 27 January 1992 (aged 17) | | (Colombia) Millonarios |
| 12 | GK | Johan Wallens | 3 August 1992 (aged 17) | | (Colombia) Deportivo Cali |
| 13 | MF | Deiner Córdoba | 21 April 1992 (aged 17) | | (Colombia) Deportivo Pereira |
| 14 | MF | Carlos Robles | 16 May 1992 (aged 17) | | (Colombia) Deportes Quindío |
| 15 | DF | **Santiago Arias** | 13 January 1992 (aged 17) | | (Colombia) La Equidad |
| 16 | FW | Jorge Luis Ramos | 2 October 1992 (aged 17) | | (Colombia) Real Cartagena |
| 17 | DF | Álvaro Hungría | 24 March 1992 (aged 17) | | (Colombia) Deportivo Cali |
| 18 | FW | Christian Mafla | 15 January 1993 (aged 16) | | (Colombia) Valledupar |
| 19 | DF | **Jeison Murillo** | 27 May 1992 (aged 17) | | (Colombia) Deportivo Cali |
| 20 | MF | **Stiven Mendoza** | 27 June 1992 (aged 17) | | (Colombia) América de Cali |
| 21 | GK | Juan Chaverra | 12 December 1992 (aged 16) | | (Colombia) Independiente Medellín |

=== Netherlands ===
Head coach: (Netherlands) Albert Stuivenberg

| No. | Pos. | Player | Date of birth (age) | Caps | Club |
|---|---|---|---|---|---|
| 1 | GK | Patrick ter Mate | 17 February 1992 (aged 17) | | (Netherlands) Vitesse |
| 2 | DF | **Joël Veltman** | 15 January 1992 (aged 17) | | (Netherlands) Ajax |
| 3 | DF | **Stefan de Vrij** | 5 February 1992 (aged 17) | | (Netherlands) Feyenoord |
| 4 | DF | Dico Koppers | 31 January 1992 (aged 17) | | (Netherlands) Ajax |
| 5 | DF | **Bruno Martins Indi** | 8 February 1992 (aged 17) | | (Netherlands) Feyenoord |
| 6 | MF | **Zakaria Labyad** | 9 March 1993 (aged 16) | | (Netherlands) PSV |
| 7 | FW | **Shabir Isoufi** | 9 March 1992 (aged 17) | | (Netherlands) Feyenoord |
| 8 | MF | Ouasim Bouy | 11 June 1993 (aged 16) | | (Netherlands) Ajax |
| 9 | FW | Luc Castaignos | 27 September 1992 (aged 17) | | (Netherlands) Feyenoord |
| 10 | MF | **Oğuzhan Özyakup (c)** | 23 September 1992 (aged 17) | | (England) Arsenal |
| 11 | FW | **Ola John** | 19 May 1992 (aged 17) | | (Netherlands) Twente |
| 12 | DF | Ruben Ligeon | 24 May 1992 (aged 17) | | (Netherlands) Ajax |
| 13 | FW | Bob Schepers | 30 March 1992 (aged 17) | | (Netherlands) Cambuur |
| 14 | MF | Bryan Smeets | 22 November 1992 (aged 16) | | (Netherlands) MVV |
| 15 | FW | Tom Boere | 24 November 1992 (aged 16) | | (Netherlands) Ajax |
| 16 | GK | **Warner Hahn** | 15 June 1992 (aged 17) | | (Netherlands) Ajax |
| 17 | MF | **Adam Maher** | 20 July 1993 (aged 16) | | (Netherlands) AZ |
| 18 | DF | Mats van Huijgevoort | 16 January 1993 (aged 16) | | (Netherlands) Feyenoord |
| 19 | DF | Maikel Verkoelen | 18 March 1992 (aged 17) | | (Netherlands) PSV |
| 20 | MF | Kevin Jansen | 8 April 1992 (aged 17) | | (Netherlands) Feyenoord |
| 21 | GK | Stan Berrevoets | 15 May 1992 (aged 17) | | (Netherlands) Ajax |

== Group D ==
=== Turkey ===
Head coach: (Turkey) Abdullah Ercan

| No. | Pos. | Player | Date of birth (age) | Caps | Club |
|---|---|---|---|---|---|
| 1 | GK | Deniz Mehmet | 19 September 1992 (aged 17) | | (England) West Ham United |
| 2 | DF | Okan Alkan | 1 October 1992 (aged 17) | | (Turkey) Fenerbahçe |
| 3 | DF | Nurettin Kayaoğlu | 8 January 1992 (aged 17) | | (Germany) Schalke 04 |
| 4 | DF | Furkan Şeker | 17 March 1992 (aged 17) | | (Turkey) Beşiktaş |
| 5 | DF | Oğulcan Gokce | 15 January 1992 (aged 17) | | (Turkey) Altay |
| 6 | MF | Orhan Gülle | 15 January 1992 (aged 17) | | (Turkey) Beşiktaş |
| 7 | MF | Berkin Kamil Arslan | 3 February 1992 (aged 17) | | (Turkey) Galatasaray |
| 8 | MF | Kamil Çörekçi | 1 February 1992 (aged 17) | | (England) Millwall |
| 9 | FW | **Muhammet Demir (c)** | 10 January 1992 (aged 17) | | (Turkey) Bursaspor |
| 10 | MF | Engin Bekdemir | 7 February 1992 (aged 17) | | (Netherlands) PSV |
| 11 | FW | **Ömer Ali Şahiner** | 2 January 1992 (aged 17) | | (Turkey) Konya Şekerspor |
| 12 | GK | Sercan Hacıoğlu | 22 January 1992 (aged 17) | | (Turkey) Beşiktaş |
| 13 | DF | Sezer Özmen | 7 July 1992 (aged 17) | | (Turkey) Beşiktaş |
| 14 | FW | Gökay Iravul | 18 October 1992 (aged 17) | | (Turkey) Fenerbahçe |
| 15 | MF | Ensar Baykan | 22 January 1992 (aged 17) | | (Germany) Arminia Bielefeld |
| 16 | DF | Süleyman Özdamar | 25 February 1993 (aged 16) | | (Turkey) Altay |
| 17 | MF | Gökay Işıtan | 20 February 1992 (aged 17) | | (Germany) Hamburger SV |
| 18 | MF | Ufuk Özbek | 1 September 1992 (aged 17) | | (Germany) Schalke 04 |
| 19 | DF | Onur Karakabak | 8 April 1992 (aged 17) | | (Turkey) Fenerbahçe |
| 20 | FW | Hasan Ahmet Sarı | 21 January 1992 (aged 17) | | (Turkey) Trabzonspor |
| 21 | GK | Ömer Kahveci | 15 February 1992 (aged 17) | | (Turkey) Adana Demirspor |

=== Burkina Faso ===
Head coach: (Germany) Rainer Willfeld

| No. | Pos. | Player | Date of birth (age) | Caps | Club |
|---|---|---|---|---|---|
| 1 | GK | **Germain Sanou** | 26 May 1992 (aged 17) | | (Burkina Faso) IFAM |
| 2 | DF | Adama Haiki | 2 February 1992 (aged 17) | | (Burkina Faso) IFAM |
| 3 | DF | **Mohamed Ouattara** | 7 March 1993 (aged 16) | | (Burkina Faso) IFAM |
| 4 | MF | Delwendé Yanogo | 12 September 1993 (aged 16) | | (Burkina Faso) FAC |
| 5 | MF | Ibrahim Barry | 31 January 1993 (aged 16) | | (Burkina Faso) Faso Foot Espoir |
| 6 | DF | Ismaël Zagre | 21 December 1992 (aged 16) | | (Burkina Faso) Kozaf |
| 7 | FW | Louckmane Ouédraogo | 17 October 1992 (aged 17) | | (Ghana) Feyenoord Fetteh |
| 8 | FW | Victor Nikiema | 23 September 1993 (aged 16) | | (Burkina Faso) Naba Kango |
| 9 | FW | Abdoulaye Ibrango | 22 December 1992 (aged 16) | | (Burkina Faso) Naba Kango |
| 10 | FW | Fadil Sido | 12 April 1993 (aged 16) | | (Burkina Faso) Naba Kango |
| 11 | DF | Abdoul Nikiema | 24 July 1993 (aged 16) | | (Ghana) Feyenoord Fetteh |
| 12 | FW | Hamed Zoungrana | 14 January 1993 (aged 16) | | (Burkina Faso) Naba Kango |
| 13 | MF | Moussa Dao | 26 August 1992 (aged 17) | | (Burkina Faso) Naba Kango |
| 14 | DF | Dalhata Soro (c) | 18 November 1992 (aged 16) | | (Burkina Faso) ASFA Yennenga |
| 15 | MF | Ousmane Derra | 13 May 1993 (aged 16) | | (Burkina Faso) Faso Foot Espoir |
| 16 | GK | Lassane Nikiema | 16 December 1993 (aged 15) | | (Burkina Faso) FAC |
| 17 | MF | **Bertrand Traoré** | 6 September 1995 (aged 14) | | (Burkina Faso) ASF Bobo-Dioulasso |
| 18 | MF | Farouck Kabore | 23 November 1993 (aged 15) | | (Burkina Faso) FAC |
| 19 | MF | **Aboubacar Traoré** | 10 December 1992 (aged 16) | | (Burkina Faso) IFAM |
| 20 | DF | **Patrick Malo** | 18 February 1992 (aged 17) | | (Burkina Faso) IFAM |
| 21 | GK | Abdouraziz Guire | 26 April 1992 (aged 17) | | (Ghana) Feyenoord Fetteh |

=== Costa Rica ===
Head coach: (Costa Rica) Juan Diego Quesada

| No. | Pos. | Player | Date of birth (age) | Caps | Club |
|---|---|---|---|---|---|
| 1 | GK | Ricardo Rojas | 1 March 1992 (aged 17) | | (Costa Rica) Alajuelense |
| 2 | DF | Nicholas Arlers | 26 March 1992 (aged 17) | | (Costa Rica) Milan |
| 3 | DF | Josué Aguilar | 11 July 1992 (aged 17) | | (Costa Rica) San Carlos |
| 4 | MF | Alejandro Calderón | 26 February 1992 (aged 17) | | (Costa Rica) Herediano |
| 5 | MF | Pablo Martínez | 14 January 1992 (aged 17) | | (Costa Rica) Alajuelense |
| 6 | DF | Jeisson Peña | 5 June 1992 (aged 17) | | (Costa Rica) Puntarenas |
| 7 | DF | Danny Blanco | 9 January 1992 (aged 17) | | (Costa Rica) Alajuelense |
| 8 | FW | **Juan Bustos Golobio** | 7 September 1992 (aged 17) | | (Costa Rica) Saprissa |
| 9 | FW | **Jonathan Moya** | 6 January 1992 (aged 17) | | (Costa Rica) Saprissa |
| 10 | MF | **Deyver Vega** | 19 September 1992 (aged 17) | | (Costa Rica) Saprissa |
| 11 | FW | **Joel Campbell** | 26 June 1992 (aged 17) | | (Costa Rica) Saprissa |
| 12 | FW | **Dylan Flores** | 30 May 1993 (aged 16) | | (Costa Rica) Saprissa |
| 13 | DF | Federico Crespo | 10 May 1992 (aged 17) | | (Costa Rica) Saprissa |
| 14 | MF | Rosbin Mayorga | 20 March 1992 (aged 17) | | (Costa Rica) Brujas |
| 15 | DF | **Joseph Mora** | 15 January 1993 (aged 16) | | (Costa Rica) Alajuelense |
| 16 | MF | **Ariel Soto** (c) | 14 May 1992 (aged 17) | | (Costa Rica) Brujas |
| 17 | MF | **Yeltsin Tejeda** | 17 March 1992 (aged 17) | | (Costa Rica) Saprissa |
| 18 | GK | Mauricio Vargas | 10 August 1992 (aged 17) | | (Costa Rica) Alajuelense |
| 19 | FW | Irving Huertas | 21 February 1993 (aged 16) | | Unattached |
| 20 | DF | Adrián Mora | 4 February 1992 (aged 17) | | (Costa Rica) Alajuelense |
| 21 | GK | Luis Rodríguez | 28 February 1992 (aged 17) | | (Costa Rica) Brujas |

=== New Zealand ===
Head coach: (New Zealand) Stephen Cain

| No. | Pos. | Player | Date of birth (age) | Caps | Club |
|---|---|---|---|---|---|
| 1 | GK | Coey Turipa | 22 February 1992 (aged 17) | | (New Zealand) Nelson Suburbs |
| 2 | DF | Matt Gibbons | 29 April 1992 (aged 17) | | (New Zealand) Hamilton Wanderers |
| 3 | DF | Adam Thomas | 1 April 1992 (aged 17) | | (New Zealand) Central United |
| 4 | DF | Luis Esteves | 6 June 1992 (aged 17) | | (New Zealand) Central United |
| 5 | DF | Gordon Murie (c) | 18 May 1992 (aged 17) | | (New Zealand) Birkenhead United |
| 6 | FW | Tim Pilkington | 15 May 1992 (aged 17) | | (New Zealand) East Coast Bays |
| 7 | DF | Josh Morrison | 23 September 1993 (aged 16) | | (New Zealand) Central United |
| 8 | MF | Stephen Kibby | 22 January 1992 (aged 17) | | (New Zealand) Auckland Grammar School |
| 9 | FW | Nikolai Molijn | 26 February 1992 (aged 17) | | (New Zealand) Ellerslie |
| 10 | MF | Zane Sole | 11 January 1992 (aged 17) | | (New Zealand) Waitakere United |
| 11 | MF | Jack Hobson-McVeigh | 10 June 1992 (aged 17) | | (New Zealand) Birkenhead United |
| 12 | DF | Tane Gent | 25 July 1993 (aged 16) | | (New Zealand) Central United |
| 13 | MF | Michael Built | 12 November 1992 (aged 16) | | (England) Northampton Town |
| 14 | MF | Thomas Spragg | 2 February 1993 (aged 16) | | (New Zealand) Central United |
| 15 | FW | Andrew Milne | 3 January 1992 (aged 17) | | (Scotland) Rangers |
| 16 | MF | Jamie Doris | 3 February 1993 (aged 16) | | (Scotland) Hibernian |
| 17 | MF | **Cameron Lindsay** | 21 December 1992 (aged 16) | | (England) Blackburn Rovers |
| 18 | DF | Ashton Pett | 30 April 1992 (aged 17) | | (New Zealand) Bay Olympic |
| 19 | FW | Andrew Bevin | 16 May 1992 (aged 17) | | (New Zealand) Napier City Rovers |
| 20 | GK | Alex Carr | 9 March 1993 (aged 16) | | (New Zealand) Central United |
| 21 | GK | Patrick George | 8 September 1992 (aged 17) | | (New Zealand) Central United |

== Group E ==
=== United Arab Emirates ===
Head coach: (United Arab Emirates) Ali Ebrahim

| No. | Pos. | Player | Date of birth (age) | Caps | Club |
|---|---|---|---|---|---|
| 1 | GK | Abdulla Ali | 16 December 1992 (aged 16) | | (United Arab Emirates) Al Ain |
| 2 | MF | Khalifa Abdulrahman | 28 April 1992 (aged 17) | | (United Arab Emirates) Al Wasl |
| 3 | DF | Rashid Mohamed | 18 December 1992 (aged 16) | | (United Arab Emirates) Al-Nasr |
| 4 | DF | Ahmed Mohammed Al Balooshi | 23 April 1992 (aged 17) | | (United Arab Emirates) Al Ain |
| 5 | DF | Abdelaziz Abbas | 26 March 1992 (aged 17) | | (United Arab Emirates) Dubai |
| 6 | DF | Abdulrahman Yousuf | 28 August 1993 (aged 16) | | (United Arab Emirates) Al Wasl |
| 7 | FW | Ahmad Ghuloom | 25 January 1992 (aged 17) | | (United Arab Emirates) Al Wasl |
| 8 | MF | **Majed Hassan** | 1 August 1992 (aged 17) | | (United Arab Emirates) Al-Ahli |
| 9 | FW | Mohamed Hussain | 1 January 1993 (aged 16) | | (United Arab Emirates) Al-Jazira |
| 10 | FW | Fahad Hadeed | 7 July 1993 (aged 16) | | (United Arab Emirates) Al Sharjah |
| 11 | MF | Hassan Yousuf | 29 January 1992 (aged 17) | | (United Arab Emirates) Al Wasl |
| 12 | FW | Mohammad Sebil | 13 April 1993 (aged 16) | | (United Arab Emirates) Al-Nasr |
| 13 | MF | Omar Salem | 29 July 1992 (aged 17) | | (United Arab Emirates) Ajman |
| 14 | FW | Ahmad Ismail | 8 March 1992 (aged 17) | | (United Arab Emirates) Al-Nasr |
| 15 | MF | Haddaf | 21 February 1992 (aged 17) | | (United Arab Emirates) Al Ain |
| 16 | MF | Waled Husain | 15 May 1992 (aged 17) | | (United Arab Emirates) Al-Ahli |
| 17 | GK | Ahmad Shambih | 20 December 1993 (aged 15) | | (United Arab Emirates) Al-Nasr |
| 18 | MF | Ali Murad | 13 December 1992 (aged 16) | | (United Arab Emirates) Al-Wahda |
| 19 | GK | Eesa Abbas | 30 June 1992 (aged 17) | | (United Arab Emirates) Al-Shabab |
| 20 | MF | Sulaiman Mohamed | 26 September 1992 (aged 17) | | (United Arab Emirates) Al Dhafra |
| 21 | DF | Marwan Al-Saffar (c) | 25 April 1992 (aged 17) | | (United Arab Emirates) Al-Nasr |

=== Malawi ===
Head coach: (Malawi) John Kaputa

| No. | Pos. | Player | Date of birth (age) | Caps | Club |
|---|---|---|---|---|---|
| 1 | GK | Cuthbert Seengwa (c) | 19 April 1992 (aged 17) | | Unattached |
| 2 | DF | Pilirani Zonda | 27 November 1994 (aged 14) | | Unattached |
| 3 | DF | Kondwani Lufeyo | 12 November 1992 (aged 16) | | (Malawi) Tigers |
| 4 | MF | Patience Kalumo | 15 October 1994 (aged 15) | | Unattached |
| 5 | DF | Robert Simkonda | 22 February 1993 (aged 16) | | Unattached |
| 6 | DF | Peter Mselema | 20 November 1993 (aged 15) | | Unattached |
| 7 | FW | Tonny Chitsulo | 13 August 1993 (aged 16) | | (Malawi) Silver Strikers |
| 8 | MF | Bongani Kaipa | 24 November 1993 (aged 15) | | Unattached |
| 9 | FW | Andy Mpetiwa | 2 May 1993 (aged 16) | | Unattached |
| 10 | FW | **Luke Milanzi** | 4 December 1994 (aged 14) | | (Malawi) Eagle Strikers |
| 11 | FW | Maxwell Mwanyongo | 2 August 1993 (aged 16) | | Unattached |
| 12 | MF | **Gilbert Chirwa** | 14 February 1994 (aged 15) | | Unattached |
| 13 | DF | Francis Mulimbika | 27 March 1993 (aged 16) | | Unattached |
| 14 | MF | Gastin Simkonda | 26 February 1993 (aged 16) | | Unattached |
| 15 | DF | Issa Takondwa | 7 July 1993 (aged 16) | | Unattached |
| 16 | GK | Victor Nangwale | 12 October 1993 (aged 16) | | (Malawi) Blackpool |
| 17 | MF | Mike Kaziputa | 9 October 1993 (aged 16) | | Unattached |
| 18 | MF | **Kelvin Hanganda** | 15 August 1994 (aged 15) | | Unattached |
| 19 | MF | Kingstone Chindebvu | 12 July 1994 (aged 15) | | Unattached |
| 20 | MF | Willie Saenda | 7 August 1992 (aged 17) | | Unattached |
| 21 | GK | Jailosi Kapalamula | 12 January 1993 (aged 16) | | (Malawi) Nchalo United |

=== Spain ===
Head coach: (Spain) Ginés Meléndez

| No. | Pos. | Player | Date of birth (age) | Caps | Club |
|---|---|---|---|---|---|
| 1 | GK | Édgar Badía | 12 February 1992 (aged 17) | | (Spain) Espanyol |
| 2 | DF | Albert Blázquez | 21 January 1992 (aged 17) | | (Spain) Espanyol |
| 3 | DF | Jon Aurtenetxe | 3 January 1992 (aged 17) | | (Spain) Athletic Bilbao |
| 4 | DF | Sergi Gómez | 28 March 1992 (aged 17) | | (Spain) Barcelona |
| 5 | DF | Marc Muniesa (c) | 27 March 1992 (aged 17) | | (Spain) Barcelona |
| 6 | MF | **Koke** | 8 January 1992 (aged 17) | | (Spain) Atlético Madrid |
| 7 | FW | **Iker Muniain** | 19 December 1992 (aged 16) | | (Spain) Athletic Bilbao |
| 8 | MF | Edu Ramos | 17 February 1992 (aged 17) | | (Spain) Málaga |
| 9 | FW | Borja | 25 August 1992 (aged 17) | | (Spain) Atlético Madrid |
| 10 | FW | **Isco** | 21 April 1992 (aged 17) | | (Spain) Valencia |
| 11 | MF | Adrià Carmona | 8 February 1992 (aged 17) | | (Spain) Barcelona |
| 12 | FW | **Álvaro Morata** | 23 October 1992 (aged 17) | | (Spain) Real Madrid |
| 13 | GK | Julen Celaya | 25 January 1992 (aged 17) | | (Spain) Real Sociedad |
| 14 | DF | **Jordi Amat** | 21 March 1992 (aged 17) | | (Spain) Espanyol |
| 15 | MF | Javier Espinosa | 19 September 1992 (aged 17) | | (Spain) Barcelona |
| 16 | MF | Kamal | 9 March 1992 (aged 17) | | (Spain) Real Madrid |
| 17 | MF | **Pablo Sarabia** | 11 May 1992 (aged 17) | | (Spain) Real Madrid |
| 18 | MF | **Sergi Roberto** | 7 February 1992 (aged 17) | | (Spain) Barcelona |
| 19 | FW | Kevin Lacruz | 13 February 1992 (aged 17) | | (Spain) Real Zaragoza |
| 20 | DF | Albert Dalmau | 16 March 1992 (aged 17) | | (Spain) Barcelona |
| 21 | GK | Yeray Gómez | 10 June 1992 (aged 17) | | (Spain) Mallorca |

=== United States ===
Head coach: (Colombia) Wilmer Cabrera

| No. | Pos. | Player | Date of birth (age) | Caps | Club |
|---|---|---|---|---|---|
| 1 | GK | Earl Edwards Jr. | 24 January 1992 (aged 17) | | (United States) La Jolla Nomads |
| 2 | MF | Jared Watts | 3 February 1992 (aged 17) | | (United States) North Meck SC |
| 3 | DF | Tyler Polak | 13 May 1992 (aged 17) | | (United States) Capital Soccer Academy |
| 4 | DF | **Perry Kitchen (c)** | 29 February 1992 (aged 17) | | (United States) Chicago Magic |
| 5 | MF | Marlon Duran | 25 January 1992 (aged 17) | | (United States) Latino Americana |
| 6 | DF | Zach Herold | 6 July 1992 (aged 17) | | (United States) West Pines United |
| 7 | FW | Stefan Jerome | 11 August 1992 (aged 17) | | (United States) West Pines United |
| 8 | MF | Alex Shinsky | 4 February 1993 (aged 16) | | (United States) Supernova FC |
| 9 | FW | **Jack McInerney** | 8 May 1992 (aged 17) | | (United States) Cobb SC |
| 10 | MF | **Luis Gil** | 14 November 1993 (aged 15) | | (United States) Pateadores |
| 11 | MF | Nick Palodichuk | 15 September 1992 (aged 17) | | (United States) Washington Premier |
| 12 | GK | Spencer Richey | 30 May 1992 (aged 17) | | (United States) Crossfire Premier |
| 13 | FW | Dominick Sarle | 15 September 1992 (aged 17) | | (United States) B.W. Gottschee |
| 14 | MF | Carlos Martínez | 21 January 1992 (aged 17) | | (United States) Wilmington Jr. |
| 15 | DF | **Eriq Zavaleta** | 8 February 1992 (aged 17) | | (United States) FC Pride |
| 16 | FW | **Juan Agudelo** | 23 November 1992 (aged 16) | | (United States) New York Red Bulls |
| 17 | MF | Will Packwood | 21 May 1993 (aged 16) | | (England) Birmingham City |
| 18 | FW | Andy Craven | 21 January 1992 (aged 17) | | (United States) First Coast Kicks |
| 19 | FW | Víctor Chavez | 25 August 1992 (aged 17) | | (United States) Real SoCal |
| 20 | DF | Boyd Okwuonu | 24 February 1993 (aged 16) | | (United States) Tulsa Thunder |
| 21 | GK | Keith Cardona | 11 July 1992 (aged 17) | | (United States) New York Red Bulls |

== Group F ==
=== Uruguay ===
Head coach: (Uruguay) Roland Marcenaro

| No. | Pos. | Player | Date of birth (age) | Caps | Club |
|---|---|---|---|---|---|
| 1 | GK | Salvador Ichazo | 26 January 1992 (aged 17) | | (Uruguay) Danubio |
| 2 | DF | Ramón Arias | 27 July 1992 (aged 17) | | (Uruguay) Defensor Sporting |
| 3 | DF | Diego Polenta (c) | 6 February 1992 (aged 17) | | (Italy) Genoa |
| 4 | DF | Santiago Pereyra | 2 June 1992 (aged 17) | | (Uruguay) Nacional |
| 5 | MF | Nicolás Prieto | 5 September 1992 (aged 17) | | (Uruguay) Nacional |
| 6 | DF | Bruno Marchelli | 1 July 1992 (aged 17) | | (Uruguay) Nacional |
| 7 | FW | Gonzalo Barreto | 22 January 1992 (aged 17) | | (Uruguay) Danubio |
| 8 | MF | Sebastián Rodríguez | 16 August 1992 (aged 17) | | (Uruguay) Danubio |
| 9 | MF | Adrián Luna | 12 April 1992 (aged 17) | | (Uruguay) Defensor Sporting |
| 10 | MF | Sebastián Gallegos | 18 January 1992 (aged 17) | | (Spain) Atlético Madrid |
| 11 | MF | Bernardo Laureiro | 2 February 1992 (aged 17) | | (Uruguay) Defensor Sporting |
| 12 | GK | Kevin Dawson | 8 February 1992 (aged 17) | | (Uruguay) Nacional |
| 13 | DF | Federico Sarraute | 23 August 1992 (aged 17) | | (Uruguay) Danubio |
| 14 | DF | Rubén Silvera | 4 January 1993 (aged 16) | | (Uruguay) Defensor Sporting |
| 15 | MF | Ignacio Aviles | 23 May 1992 (aged 17) | | (Uruguay) Danubio |
| 16 | MF | Luis de los Santos | 4 March 1993 (aged 16) | | (Uruguay) Danubio |
| 17 | FW | Gastón Brugman | 7 September 1992 (aged 17) | | (Italy) Empoli |
| 18 | FW | Christian Alba | 17 April 1992 (aged 17) | | (Uruguay) Danubio |
| 19 | FW | Santiago González | 11 June 1992 (aged 17) | | (Uruguay) River Plate |
| 20 | FW | Nicolás Mezquida | 21 January 1992 (aged 17) | | (Uruguay) Peñarol |
| 21 | GK | Gabriel Araujo | 28 March 1993 (aged 16) | | (Uruguay) Nacional |

=== South Korea ===
Head coach: (South Korea) Lee Kwang-jong

| No. | Pos. | Player | Date of birth (age) | Caps | Club |
|---|---|---|---|---|---|
| 1 | GK | Kim Jin-young (c) | 2 March 1992 (aged 17) | | (South Korea) Yiri High School |
| 2 | DF | Kim Dong-jin | 28 December 1992 (aged 16) | | (South Korea) Andong High School |
| 3 | DF | Kim Young-seung | 22 February 1993 (aged 16) | | (South Korea) Shingal High School |
| 4 | DF | Park Sun-ju | 26 March 1993 (aged 16) | | (South Korea) Eonnam High School |
| 5 | DF | Kim Min-hyeok | 27 February 1992 (aged 17) | | (South Korea) Suncheon High School |
| 6 | MF | Lee Joong-kwon | 1 January 1992 (aged 17) | | (South Korea) Jeonnam Dragons |
| 7 | MF | **Yun Il-lok** | 7 March 1992 (aged 17) | | (South Korea) Gyeongnam FC |
| 8 | MF | Ahn Jin-beom | 10 March 1992 (aged 17) | | (South Korea) Bukyeong High School |
| 9 | FW | **Lee Jong-ho** | 24 February 1992 (aged 17) | | (South Korea) Jeonnam Dragons |
| 10 | MF | Nam Seung-woo | 18 February 1992 (aged 17) | | (South Korea) Bukyeong High School |
| 11 | MF | Joo Ik-seong | 10 September 1992 (aged 17) | | (South Korea) Taesung High School |
| 12 | MF | Ko Rae-se | 23 March 1992 (aged 17) | | (South Korea) Gyeongnam FC |
| 13 | DF | Lim Dong-cheon | 13 November 1992 (aged 16) | | (South Korea) Baekam High School |
| 14 | FW | Lee Kang | 10 September 1992 (aged 17) | | (South Korea) Jaehyun High School |
| 15 | DF | Cho Min-woo | 13 May 1992 (aged 17) | | (South Korea) FC Seoul |
| 16 | MF | Lee Min-soo | 11 January 1992 (aged 17) | | (South Korea) Moonsung High School |
| 17 | FW | **Son Heung-min** | 8 July 1992 (aged 17) | | (South Korea) FC Seoul |
| 18 | GK | Choi Bong-jin | 6 April 1992 (aged 17) | | (South Korea) Bukyeong High School |
| 19 | FW | Kim Ji-hun | 24 May 1992 (aged 17) | | (South Korea) Jeonju Technical High School |
| 20 | DF | **Kim Jin-su** | 13 June 1992 (aged 17) | | (South Korea) Shingal High School |
| 21 | GK | Lee Chang-keun | 30 August 1993 (aged 16) | | (South Korea) Busan IPark |

=== Algeria ===
Head coach: (Algeria) Otmane Ibrir

| No. | Pos. | Player | Date of birth (age) | Caps | Club |
|---|---|---|---|---|---|
| 1 | GK | Abdennour Merzouki | 15 February 1992 (aged 17) | | (Algeria) FAF Academy |
| 2 | DF | Ahmed Cheheima | 8 April 1992 (aged 17) | | (Algeria) FAF Academy |
| 3 | DF | Mustapha Bouteldja | 10 February 1992 (aged 17) | | (Algeria) FAF Academy |
| 4 | DF | Ilyas Cherchar (c) | 18 January 1992 (aged 17) | | (Algeria) FAF Academy |
| 5 | DF | Ibrahim Bekakchi | 10 January 1992 (aged 17) | | (Algeria) FAF Academy |
| 6 | MF | Houssem Ferkous | 31 January 1992 (aged 17) | | (Algeria) FAF Academy |
| 7 | MF | Abdelghani Boughoula | 27 September 1992 (aged 17) | | (Algeria) FAF Academy |
| 8 | DF | Djelloul Djouba | 2 April 1992 (aged 17) | | (Algeria) FAF Academy |
| 9 | FW | Abdelmadjid Ammari | 10 April 1992 (aged 17) | | (France) Marseille |
| 10 | MF | Abdelhakim Bezzaz | 20 October 1992 (aged 17) | | (Algeria) FAF Academy |
| 11 | FW | Saïd Ferguène | 16 June 1992 (aged 17) | | (Algeria) JS Kabylie |
| 12 | MF | Ziri Hammar | 25 July 1992 (aged 17) | | (France) Nancy |
| 13 | FW | Aghiles Toulait | 7 April 1992 (aged 17) | | (Algeria) FAF Academy |
| 14 | FW | Mohamed Omrani | 17 January 1992 (aged 17) | | (Algeria) FAF Academy |
| 15 | MF | Julien López | 1 March 1992 (aged 17) | | (France) Montpellier |
| 16 | GK | Nacer Zaabat | 19 January 1992 (aged 17) | | (Algeria) FAF Academy |
| 17 | MF | Mohamed Nadir Ziane | 27 March 1992 (aged 17) | | (Algeria) FAF Academy |
| 18 | FW | Youcef Khelifi | 4 March 1992 (aged 17) | | (Algeria) FAF Academy |
| 19 | DF | Abderrahmane Belkadi | 6 June 1992 (aged 17) | | (Algeria) FAF Academy |
| 20 | DF | Billel Khida | 29 February 1992 (aged 17) | | (Algeria) FAF Academy |
| 21 | GK | Abdelwakil Talhi | 14 March 1992 (aged 17) | | (Algeria) OMR El Annasser |

=== Italy ===
Head coach: (Italy) Pasquale Salerno

| No. | Pos. | Player | Date of birth (age) | Caps | Club |
|---|---|---|---|---|---|
| 1 | GK | **Mattia Perin** | 10 November 1992 (aged 16) | | (Italy) Genoa |
| 2 | DF | Felice Natalino | 24 March 1992 (aged 17) | | (Italy) Inter Milan |
| 3 | DF | Federico Mannini | 18 April 1992 (aged 17) | | (Italy) Siena |
| 4 | DF | Vincenzo Camilleri | 6 March 1992 (aged 17) | | (Italy) Reggina |
| 5 | DF | Simone Sini (c) | 9 April 1992 (aged 17) | | (Italy) Roma |
| 6 | MF | Lorenzo Crisetig | 20 January 1993 (aged 16) | | (Italy) Inter Milan |
| 7 | MF | Alessandro Scialpi | 23 February 1992 (aged 17) | | (Italy) Genoa |
| 8 | MF | Alessandro De Vitis | 15 February 1992 (aged 17) | | (Italy) Parma |
| 9 | FW | Giacomo Beretta | 14 March 1992 (aged 17) | | (Italy) Milan |
| 10 | MF | **Stephan El Shaarawy** | 27 October 1992 (aged 16) | | (Italy) Genoa |
| 11 | FW | Simone Dell'Agnello | 22 April 1992 (aged 17) | | (Italy) Inter Milan |
| 12 | GK | Francesco Bardi | 18 January 1992 (aged 17) | | (Italy) Livorno |
| 13 | DF | Simone Benedetti | 3 April 1992 (aged 17) | | (Italy) Torino |
| 14 | DF | Andrea Bagnai | 2 April 1992 (aged 17) | | (Italy) Fiorentina |
| 15 | DF | Michele Camporese | 19 May 1992 (aged 17) | | (Italy) Fiorentina |
| 16 | MF | Leonardo Bianchi | 28 January 1992 (aged 17) | | (Italy) Empoli |
| 17 | FW | Alberto Libertazzi | 1 January 1992 (aged 17) | | (Italy) Juventus |
| 18 | FW | Pietro Iemmello | 6 March 1992 (aged 17) | | (Italy) Fiorentina |
| 19 | MF | Marco Fossati | 5 October 1992 (aged 17) | | (Italy) Inter Milan |
| 20 | MF | Federico Carraro | 23 June 1992 (aged 17) | | (Italy) Fiorentina |
| 21 | GK | Giacomo Venturi | 2 January 1992 (aged 17) | | (Italy) Bologna |
