= 2009 UEFA European Under-17 Championship squads =

Football tournament squads

Below are the squads for the 2009 UEFA U-17 Championship tournament in Germany. Players whose names are marked in bold went on to earn full international caps.

Players' ages as of the tournament's opening day (6 May 2009).

== Group A ==
=== Spain ===
Head coach: Ginés Meléndez

No.	Pos.	Player	Date of birth (age)	Caps	Goals	Club
1	GK	Édgar Badía	11 February 1992 (aged 17)			(Royal Spanish Football Federation) Espanyol
2	DF	Albert Dalmau	16 March 1992 (aged 17)			(Royal Spanish Football Federation) Barcelona
3	DF	Albert Blázquez	21 January 1992 (aged 17)			(Royal Spanish Football Federation) Espanyol
4	DF	Marc Muniesa	27 March 1992 (aged 17)			(Royal Spanish Football Federation) Barcelona
5	DF	Adrià Blanchart	19 March 1992 (aged 17)			(Royal Spanish Football Federation) Barcelona
6	MF	**Koke**	8 January 1992 (aged 17)			(Royal Spanish Football Federation) Atlético Madrid
7	MF	Kevin Lacruz	8 April 1992 (aged 17)			(Royal Spanish Football Federation) Zaragoza
8	MF	Álex Fernández	15 October 1992 (aged 16)			(Royal Spanish Football Federation) Real Madrid
9	FW	Borja Bastón	25 August 1992 (aged 16)			(Royal Spanish Football Federation) Atlético Madrid
10	MF	**Isco**	21 April 1992 (aged 17)			(Royal Spanish Football Federation) Valencia
11	FW	**Pablo Sarabia**	11 May 1992 (aged 16)			(Royal Spanish Football Federation) Real Madrid
12	DF	Enric Saborit	27 April 1992 (aged 17)			(Royal Spanish Football Federation) Athletic Bilbao
13	GK	Yeray Gómez	10 June 1992 (aged 16)			(Royal Spanish Football Federation) San Francisco
14	DF	Sergi Gómez	28 March 1992 (aged 17)			(Royal Spanish Football Federation) Barcelona
15	FW	**Iker Muniain**	19 December 1992 (aged 16)			(Royal Spanish Football Federation) Athletic Bilbao
16	MF	Rubén Pardo	22 October 1992 (aged 16)			(Royal Spanish Football Federation) Real Sociedad
17	MF	Cifo	6 August 1992 (aged 16)			(Royal Spanish Football Federation) Valencia
18	FW	Rubén Sobrino	16 February 1992 (aged 17)			(Royal Spanish Football Federation) Real Madrid
19	MF	Portu	21 May 1992 (aged 16)			(Royal Spanish Football Federation) Valencia

=== France ===
Head coach: Philippe Bergeroo

No.	Pos.	Player	Date of birth (age)	Caps	Goals	Club
1	GK	Zacharie Boucher	7 March 1992 (aged 17)	10	0	(French Football Federation) Le Havre
2	DF	Alassane També	26 January 1992 (aged 17)	12	2	(French Football Federation) Paris Saint-Germain
3	DF	**Atila Turan**	10 April 1992 (aged 17)	15	0	(French Football Federation) Grenoble
4	DF	Dennis Appiah	9 June 1992 (aged 16)	16	0	(French Football Federation) Monaco
5	DF	Darnel Situ (c)	18 March 1992 (aged 17)	15	3	(French Football Federation) Lens
6	DF	**Nampalys Mendy**	23 June 1992 (aged 16)	3	0	(French Football Federation) Monaco
7	MF	**Yeni Ngbakoto**	23 January 1992 (aged 17)	12	3	(French Football Federation) Metz
8	MF	Alexandre Coeff	20 February 1992 (aged 17)	15	2	(French Football Federation) Lens
9	FW	Benjamin Jeannot	22 January 1992 (aged 17)	8	2	(French Football Federation) Nancy
10	FW	Chris Gadi	9 April 1992 (aged 17)	10	2	(French Football Federation) Marseille
11	MF	**Mehdi Abeid**	6 August 1992 (aged 16)	14	2	(French Football Federation) Lens
12	DF	Pierrick Cros	17 March 1992 (aged 17)	7	0	(French Football Federation) Saint-Étienne
13	DF	Guy Pellet	20 January 1992 (aged 17)	1	0	(French Football Federation) Saint-Étienne
14	MF	Arnaud Souquet	12 February 1992 (aged 17)	13	2	(French Football Federation) Lille
15	MF	**Christopher Missilou**	18 July 1992 (aged 16)	11	0	(French Football Federation) Auxerre
16	GK	Mehdi Taïeb	2 February 1992 (aged 17)	1	0	(French Football Federation) Châteauroux
17	FW	Jimmy Kamghain	3 July 1992 (aged 16)	7	3	(French Football Federation) Paris Saint-Germain
18	FW	**Ishak Belfodil**	12 January 1992 (aged 17)	1	0	(French Football Federation) Lyon
19	FW	**Idriss Saadi**	8 February 1992 (aged 17)	5	3	(French Football Federation) Saint-Étienne

=== Italy ===
Head coach: Pasquale Salerno

No.	Pos.	Player	Date of birth (age)	Caps	Goals	Club
1	GK	**Mattia Perin**	10 November 1992 (aged 16)			(Italian Football Federation) Genoa
2	FW	Francesco Finocchio	30 April 1992 (aged 17)			(Italian Football Federation) Parma
3	DF	Stefano Baraldo	25 January 1992 (aged 17)	6	0	(Italian Football Federation) Piacenza
4	DF	Alessio Campoli	17 January 1992 (aged 17)			(Italian Football Federation) Lazio
5	DF	Simone Benedetti	3 April 1992 (aged 17)			(Italian Football Federation) Torino
6	DF	Vincenzo Camilleri	5 May 1992 (aged 17)			(Italian Football Federation) Reggina
7	DF	Simone Sini	9 April 1992 (aged 17)			(Italian Football Federation) Roma
8	MF	Marco Fossati	5 October 1992 (aged 16)			(Italian Football Federation) Internazionale
9	MF	Alessandro De Vitis	15 February 1992 (aged 17)			(Italian Football Federation) Fiorentina
10	MF	**Stephan El Shaarawy**	27 October 1992 (aged 16)			(Italian Football Federation) Genoa
11	FW	Simone Dell'Agnello	12 April 1992 (aged 17)			(Italian Football Federation) Internazionale
12	GK	Francesco Bardi	18 January 1992 (aged 17)			(Italian Football Federation) Livorno
13	MF	Felice Natalino	24 March 1992 (aged 17)			(Italian Football Federation) Internazionale
14	DF	Michele Camporese	19 May 1992 (aged 16)			(Italian Football Federation) Fiorentina
15	FW	Giacomo Beretta	14 March 1992 (aged 17)			(Italian Football Federation) AlbinoLeffe
16	MF	Leonardo Bianchi	18 January 1992 (aged 17)	7	0	(Italian Football Federation) Empoli
17	FW	Alberto Libertazzi	1 January 1992 (aged 17)			(Italian Football Federation) Juventus
18	MF	Lorenzo Crisetig	20 January 1993 (aged 16)			(Italian Football Federation) Internazionale

=== Switzerland ===
Head coach: Dany Ryser

No.	Pos.	Player	Date of birth (age)	Caps	Goals	Club
1	GK	Benjamin Siegrist	31 January 1992 (aged 17)			(The Football Association) Aston Villa
2	DF	André Gonçalves	23 January 1992 (aged 17)			(Swiss Football Association) Zürich
3	MF	Janick Kamber	26 February 1992 (aged 17)			(Swiss Football Association) Basel
4	DF	**Charyl Chappuis**	12 January 1992 (aged 17)			(Swiss Football Association) Grasshopper
5	DF	**Frédéric Veseli**	20 November 1992 (aged 16)			(The Football Association) Manchester City
6	MF	Kofi Nimeley	11 December 1992 (aged 16)			(Swiss Football Association) Basel
7	FW	Roman Buess	21 September 1992 (aged 16)			(Swiss Football Association) Basel
8	MF	Oliver Buff	3 August 1992 (aged 16)			(Swiss Football Association) Zürich
9	FW	**Haris Seferovic**	22 February 1992 (aged 17)			(Swiss Football Association) Grasshopper
10	FW	**Nassim Ben Khalifa**	13 January 1992 (aged 17)			(Swiss Football Association) Grasshopper
11	MF	**Granit Xhaka**	27 September 1992 (aged 16)			(Swiss Football Association) Basel
12	GK	Raphael Spiegel	19 December 1992 (aged 16)			(Swiss Football Association) Grasshopper
13	DF	Bruno Martignoni	13 December 1992 (aged 16)			(Swiss Football Association) Locarno
14	MF	Nico Zwimpfer	6 July 1993 (aged 15)			(Swiss Football Association) Basel
15	MF	Maik Nakić	17 January 1992 (aged 17)			(Swiss Football Association) Sion
16	FW	Matteo Tosetti	15 February 1992 (aged 17)			(Swiss Football Association) Locarno
17	MF	Guy Eschmann	10 June 1992 (aged 16)			(Swiss Football Association) Neuchâtel Xamax
19	FW	Igor Mijatović	21 November 1992 (aged 16)			(Swiss Football Association) Bellinzona

== Group B ==
=== England ===
Head coach: John Peacock

No.	Pos.	Player	Date of birth (age)	Caps	Goals	Club
1	GK	Jed Steer	23 September 1992 (aged 16)			(The Football Association) Norwich City
2	DF	James Hurst	31 January 1992 (aged 17)			(The Football Association) Portsmouth
3	DF	Luke Garbutt	21 May 1993 (aged 15)			(The Football Association) Leeds United
4	MF	Gary Gardner	29 June 1992 (aged 16)			(The Football Association) Aston Villa
5	DF	Louis Laing	6 March 1993 (aged 16)			(The Football Association) Sunderland
6	DF	Tom Parkes	15 January 1992 (aged 17)			(The Football Association) Leicester City
7	MF	**Jonjo Shelvey**	22 February 1992 (aged 17)			(The Football Association) Charlton Athletic
8	MF	John Bostock	15 January 1992 (aged 17)			(The Football Association) Tottenham Hotspur
9	FW	Jose Baxter	7 February 1992 (aged 17)			(The Football Association) Everton
10	MF	**Jack Wilshere**	1 January 1992 (aged 17)			(The Football Association) Arsenal
11	FW	**Benik Afobe**	12 February 1993 (aged 16)			(The Football Association) Arsenal
12	FW	Luke Freeman	23 March 1992 (aged 17)			(The Football Association) Arsenal
13	GK	**Sam Johnstone**	25 March 1993 (aged 16)			(The Football Association) Manchester United
14	MF	Ryan Tunnicliffe	30 December 1992 (aged 16)			(The Football Association) Manchester United
15	DF	Eddie Oshodi	14 January 1992 (aged 17)			(The Football Association) Watford
16	FW	Lateef Elford-Alliyu	1 June 1992 (aged 16)			(The Football Association) West Bromwich Albion
17	FW	Jacob Walcott	29 June 1992 (aged 16)			(The Football Association) Reading
18	DF	Sam Habergham	29 February 1992 (aged 17)			(The Football Association) Norwich City

=== Germany ===
Head coach: Marco Pezzaiuoli

No.	Pos.	Player	Date of birth (age)	Caps	Goals	Club
1	GK	**Marc-André ter Stegen**	30 April 1992 (aged 17)			(German Football Association) Borussia Mönchengladbach
2	DF	Bienvenue Basala-Mazana	2 January 1992 (aged 17)			(German Football Association) 1. FC Köln
3	DF	**Marvin Plattenhardt**	26 January 1992 (aged 17)			(German Football Association) 1. FC Nürnberg
4	DF	Robert Labus	10 October 1992 (aged 16)			(German Football Association) Hamburger SV
5	DF	**Shkodran Mustafi**	17 April 1992 (aged 17)			(The Football Association) Everton
6	DF	Gerrit Nauber	13 April 1992 (aged 17)			(German Football Association) Bayer Leverkusen
7	MF	Christopher Buchtmann	25 April 1992 (aged 17)			(The Football Association) Liverpool
8	MF	Reinhold Yabo	10 February 1992 (aged 17)			(German Football Association) 1. FC Köln
9	FW	Lennart Thy	25 February 1992 (aged 17)			(German Football Association) Werder Bremen
10	MF	**Mario Götze**	3 June 1992 (aged 16)			(German Football Association) Borussia Dortmund
11	FW	**Abu-Bakarr Kargbo**	21 December 1992 (aged 16)			(German Football Association) Hertha BSC
12	GK	**Bernd Leno**	4 March 1992 (aged 17)			(German Football Association) VfB Stuttgart
13	DF	Niko Opper	4 February 1992 (aged 17)			(German Football Association) Bayer Leverkusen
14	MF	**Yunus Mallı**	24 February 1992 (aged 17)			(German Football Association) Borussia Mönchengladbach
17	MF	Manuel Janzer	7 March 1992 (aged 17)			(German Football Association) VfB Stuttgart
18	MF	Matthias Zimmermann	16 June 1992 (aged 16)			(German Football Association) Karlsruher SC
19	MF	Florian Trinks	11 March 1992 (aged 17)			(German Football Association) Werder Bremen
20	FW	Kevin Scheidhauer	13 February 1992 (aged 17)			(German Football Association) Vfl Wolfsburg

=== Netherlands ===
Head coach: Albert Stuivenberg

No.	Pos.	Player	Date of birth (age)	Caps	Goals	Club
1	GK	Patrick ter Mate	17 February 1992 (aged 17)			(Royal Dutch Football Association) Vitesse
2	DF	Ruben Ligeon	24 May 1992 (aged 16)			(Royal Dutch Football Association) Ajax
3	DF	**Stefan de Vrij**	5 February 1992 (aged 17)			(Royal Dutch Football Association) Feyenoord
4	DF	Dico Koppers	31 January 1992 (aged 17)			(Royal Dutch Football Association) Ajax
5	DF	Martijn de Vries	28 March 1992 (aged 17)			(Royal Dutch Football Association) Excelsior
6	MF	Jerry van Ewijk	12 March 1992 (aged 17)			(Royal Dutch Football Association) PSV Eindhoven
7	FW	**Shabir Isoufi**	9 March 1992 (aged 17)			(Royal Dutch Football Association) Feyenoord
8	MF	**Osama Rashid**	17 January 1992 (aged 17)			(Royal Dutch Football Association) Feyenoord
9	FW	Luc Castaignos	27 September 1992 (aged 16)			(Royal Dutch Football Association) Feyenoord
10	MF	**Oğuzhan Özyakup**	23 September 1992 (aged 16)			(The Football Association) Arsenal
11	FW	Nygel Velder	23 January 1992 (aged 17)			(Royal Dutch Football Association) Feyenoord
12	DF	**Joël Veltman**	15 January 1992 (aged 17)			(Royal Dutch Football Association) Ajax
13	FW	**Rangelo Janga**	16 April 1992 (aged 17)			(Royal Dutch Football Association) Excelsior
14	DF	Mohamed Madmar	26 April 1992 (aged 17)			(Royal Dutch Football Association) AZ
15	FW	Bob Schepers	30 March 1992 (aged 17)			(Royal Dutch Football Association) Cambuur
16	GK	**Warner Hahn**	15 June 1992 (aged 16)			(Royal Dutch Football Association) Ajax
17	DF	Mats van Huijgevoort	16 January 1993 (aged 16)			(Royal Dutch Football Association) Feyenoord
18	MF	Ryan Bouwmeester	25 February 1992 (aged 17)			(Royal Dutch Football Association) Feyenoord

=== Turkey ===
Head coach: Abdullah Ercan

No.	Pos.	Player	Date of birth (age)	Caps	Goals	Club
1	GK	Deniz Mehmet	19 September 1992 (aged 16)			(The Football Association) West Ham United
2	DF	Okan Alkan	1 October 1992 (aged 16)			(Turkish Football Federation) Fenerbahçe
3	DF	Nurettin Kayaoğlu	8 January 1992 (aged 17)			(German Football Association) Schalke 04
4	DF	Oğulcan Gökçe	15 January 1992 (aged 17)			(Turkish Football Federation) Altay Izmir
5	DF	Furkan Şeker	17 March 1992 (aged 17)			(Turkish Football Federation) Beşiktaş
6	MF	Orhan Gülle	15 January 1992 (aged 17)			(Turkish Football Federation) Beşiktaş
7	MF	Berkin Kamil Arslan	3 February 1992 (aged 17)			(Turkish Football Federation) Galatasaray
8	FW	Deniz Herber	5 March 1992 (aged 17)			(German Football Association) FC St. Pauli
9	FW	**Muhammet Demir**	10 January 1992 (aged 17)			(Turkish Football Federation) Bursaspor
10	FW	**Gökhan Töre**	20 January 1992 (aged 17)			(The Football Association) Chelsea
11	MF	Hasan Ahmet Sarı	21 January 1992 (aged 17)			(Turkish Football Federation) Trabzonspor
12	GK	Sercan Hacıoğlu	22 January 1992 (aged 17)			(Turkish Football Federation) Beşiktaş
13	DF	**Barış Yardımcı**	14 August 1992 (aged 16)			(Turkish Football Federation) Fenerbahçe
14	MF	Engin Bekdemir	17 February 1992 (aged 17)			(Royal Dutch Football Association) PSV Eindhoven
15	MF	Sezer Özmen	7 July 1992 (aged 16)			(Turkish Football Federation) Beşiktaş
16	MF	**Ömer Ali Şahiner**	2 January 1992 (aged 17)			(Turkish Football Federation) Konya Şekerspor
17	MF	Onur Karakabak	8 April 1992 (aged 17)			(Turkish Football Federation) Sakaryaspor
18	MF	Kamil Çörekçi	1 February 1992 (aged 17)			(The Football Association) Millwall
