= Ensar =

Ensar is a turkish masculine given name that may refer to the following notable people:

- Eno (rapper) (born Ensar Albayrak in 1998), German rapper
- Ensar Arifović (born 1980), Bosnian football striker
- Ensar Arslan (born 2001), German football winger
- Ensar Aytekin (born 1972), Turkish financial advisor and politician
- Ensar Bajramlić (born 1997), Serbian football midfielder
- Ensar Baykan (born 1992), Turkish football player
- Ensar Brunčević (born 1999), Serbian football player
- Ensar Hajder (born 1991), Bosnian swimmer
