= Aigbe =

- Gender: Female
- Language: Yoruba

Origin
- Origin: Nigeria
- Region of origin: Southwestern region

Aigbe is a Nigerian female given name. Notable people with the name include:

- Aigbe Oliha (born 1993), Nigerian footballer
- Mercy Aigbe Gentry (born 1978), Nigerian actress, director, and businesswoman
