= Oliha =

Oliha is a surname found in Nigeria. Notable people with the surname include:

- Aigbe Oliha (born 1993), Nigerian footballer
- Etinosa Oliha (born 1998), Italian boxer
- Thompson Oliha (1968–2013), Nigerian footballer
