= Ryser =

Ryser is a surname. Notable people with the surname include:

- Dany Ryser (born 1957), Swiss football manager
- H. J. Ryser (1923–1985), American mathematician
- Fritz Ryser (1873–1916), Swiss cyclist

== See also ==
- Bruck–Ryser–Chowla theorem, a result in graph theory and combinatorial matrix theory
- Gale–Ryser theorem, a result in graph theory and combinatorial matrix theory
