= Opper =

Opper may refer to:

- Bernard Opper (1915–2000), American basketball player
- Clarence V. Opper (1897–1964), United States Tax Court judge
- Don Keith Opper (born 1949), American actor, writer, and producer
- Frederick Burr Opper (1857–1937), American cartoonist
- Niko Opper (born 1992), German footballer
