= Kofi Nimeley =

Swiss-Ghanaian footballer (born 1992)

Personal information
- Full name: Kofi Ntiamoah Nimeley
- Date of birth: 11 December 1992 (age 33)
- Place of birth: Accra, Ghana
- Height: 1.76 m (5 ft 9 in)
- Positions: Right back; centre-back; defensive midfielder

Team information
- Current team: SC Binningen
- Number: 3

Youth career
- 2001–2004: Muttenz
- 2004–2010: Basel

Senior career*
Years	Team	Apps	(Gls)
2010–2013	Basel U-21	76	(2)
2013–2015	Locarno	55	(0)
2015–2016	Black Stars Basel		

International career
2006–2007	Switzerland U-15	4	(1)
2007–2008	Switzerland U-16	1	(0)
2008–2009	Switzerland U-17	14	(2)
2010–2011	Switzerland U-19	8	(0)
2012	Switzerland U-20	1	(0)
- * Club domestic league appearances and goals

Kofi Ntiamoah Nimeley (born 11 December 1992) is a Swiss-Ghanaian former professional footballer who played as defender. He was part of the Swiss U-17 team that won the 2009 FIFA U-17 World Cup. After his retirement from his football career he became real estate agent.

== Football career ==
=== Club ===
Nimeley initially started his youth football with local amateur club SV Muttenz, but soon moved to FC Basel's youth department. As Basel academy player, he rose regularly through the ranks. In the 2007–08 season he was member of the U-16 team that won the Swiss championship at that level, remaining undefeated throughout the entire season. In fact the team's last defeat had been in the 2004–05 season. Nimeley won the U-18 championship twice and broke into their U-21 team towards the end of the 2009–10 season. He made his debut for Basel U-21 on 21 April 2010 in a 4–1 home win against SV Höngg, coming on as a late substitute. He scored his first goal for the club on 12 March 2011 in a match against Grasshopper Club U-21 that ended in a 1–1 draw. He played with the team for three seasons. During this time he suffered an injury and perhaps this was also the reason that he was unable to break into the Basel first-team.

Therefore, Nimeley decided to move on. He transferred to FC Locarno, who at that time played in the Swiss Challenge League, in July 2013. He made his debut for Locarno on 14 July 2014 in a 1–0 home win against FC Biel-Bienne. But after two mixed years in Ticino, he moved back to Basel, to the Black Stars for one season. Too many injuries. Too much wrong advice. Too many wrong decisions.

=== International ===
Nimeley was a Swiss youth international, having competed from under-15 to under-20 level. He debuted for Swiss U-15 on 20 April 2007 and scored the team's only goal as they were beaten 4–1 by Germany U-15. Later, under head coach Dany Ryser, Nimeley debuted for the Swiss U-17 team on 26 March 2009, as the team played a 1–1 draw with Greece U-17. In May 2009, he then led the team as captain on two occasions, in the 2009 UEFA European Under-17 Championship, first in the 3–1 win against Italy U-17 and then again in the 1–1 draw with Spain U-17, to advance from the group stage to the semi-finals. But here the Swiss were beaten by Netherlands U-21.

In 2009, Nimeley was part of the Swiss under-17 team that won the 2009 FIFA U-17 World Cup beating the host nation Nigeria 1–0 in the final. He played in five of the seven matches at the tournament and had been an integral part of the team in helping them to qualify.

Despite featuring for Switzerland at various youth levels, Nimeley had also expressed an interest in representing Ghana at senior level.

== Private life ==
Nimeley was born in Accra, Ghana. He is the only son of his two sport interested parents. They first lived in Bubuashie, then moved to nearby Dome and the family moved to Switzerland in 1998. Young Nimeley first learnt the German language in a special school, then spent five years in the local primary school, before joining a sports school for one-and-a-half years and then he moved to an international school.

Following his professional football, he worked in a call center because he could no longer make a living from football in the 1. Liga. He advanced to become the team leader of this call center and is head of the customer relationship management in a large real estate company. Nimeley is co-owner of Training 4U GmbH.

== Honours and titles ==
- FIFA U-17 World Cup winner in 2009
- Twice Swiss champion at U-16 level
- Twice Swiss Cup winner at U-16 level
- Twice Swiss champion at U-18 level

== Notes ==
=== Sources ===
- Josef Zindel (2018). FC Basel 1893. Die ersten 125 Jahre (in German). Basel: Friedrich Reinhardt Verlag. ISBN 978-3-7245-2305-5.

=== External links ===
- Training 4U website
- Kofi Nimeley at WorldFootball.net
