= Alex Benvenga =

Italian footballer (born 1991)

Personal information
- Date of birth: 30 May 1991 (age 35)
- Place of birth: Gallipoli, Italy
- Height: 1.82 m (6 ft 0 in)
- Position: Right back

Team information
- Current team: Gallipoli

Youth career
- –2009: Lecce
- 2009–2010: Varese

Senior career*
Years	Team	Apps	(Gls)
2009–2010	Varese	1	(0)
2010–2011	Valenzana	34	(2)
2011–2012	Pisa	25	(0)
2012–2015	Varese	0	(0)
2012–2013	→ Como (loan)	21	(2)
2014	Forlì	11	(0)
2014–2015	ACR Messina	23	(0)
2015–2016	Lucchese	30	(2)
2016–2017	Nardò	24	(1)
2017	Audace Cerignola	10	(0)
2017–2018	Campobasso	12	(1)
2018	Nardò	12	(1)
2018–2019	Fidelis Andria	14	(1)
2019–2020	Taranto	20	(1)
2020–2021	Casarano	10	(1)
2021–2022	Fidelis Andria	33	(4)
2022–	Gallipoli	0	(0)
- * Club domestic league appearances and goals as of 24 April 2022

Alex Benvenga (born 30 May 1991) is an Italian footballer who plays as a right back for Serie D side Gallipoli.

== Career ==
Born in Gallipoli, the Province of Lecce, Apulia, Benvenga started his career at Apulia team U.S. Lecce. He was the member of Allievi U16 team in 2006–07 season. Benvenga was promoted to Allievi U17 and the reserve in 2007–08 and 2008–09 respectively. In July 2009 he was sold to Lega Pro Prima Divisione team Varese in co-ownership deal. He spent half season in Berretti reserve league for Varese. In January 2010 he left for Seconda Divisione club Valenzana. He also selected to Prima Div.A representatives in Lega Pro Prima Divisione under-21 Tournament in January 2010, which he won the trophy. In June 2010 Varese acquired all the registration rights from Lecce.

Benvenga's loan was converted to co-ownership deal in 2010–11 season . In June 2011 Varese bought back Benvenga . On 22 July 2011 he left for Pisa in new co-ownership deal. In June 2012 Varese bought back Benvenga again. On 11 July Benvenga left for another third division club Calcio Como in new temporary deal along with Paolo Marchi (loan) and Alessandro Scialpi (co-own) Benvenga made his debut in a friendly against Tottenham and followed by Internazionale.

On 8 August 2020, he moved to Casarano. He left the club in January 2021.

On 20 February 2021, he returned to Fidelis Andria in Serie C.
