= Stefano Baraldo =

Italian footballer (born 1992)

Personal information
- Date of birth: 25 January 1992 (age 34)
- Place of birth: Codogno, Italy
- Height: 1.79 m (5 ft 10 1/2 in)
- Position: Defender

Youth career
- Piacenza

Senior career*
Years	Team	Apps	(Gls)
2010–2012	Piacenza	0	(0)
2010–2011	→ Barletta (loan)	2	(0)
2011	→ Empoli (loan)	0	(0)

International career
2007–2008	Italy U16 (Note: Baraldo received a call-up to a friendly tournament in March 2008, however the archive of Italian Football Federation did not have the record of the matches (Ireland, Turkey, Malta), thus his cap for the under-16 team was at least: 1, as indicated by the archive, and an (unused?) substitute appearance against Turkey, as indicated by Turkish Football Federation.)	1	(0)
2008–2009	Italy U17	7	(0)
2009	Italy U18	1	(0)
- * Club domestic league appearances and goals

Stefano Baraldo (born 25 January 1992) is an Italian footballer who played in the third tier of football in Italy.

== Biography ==
Born in Codogno, Lombardy, Baraldo started his career with Emilian club Piacenza, about 14 km away from his hometown. Baraldo was the member of Italy under-17 team at 2009 UEFA European Under-17 Football Championship. He left the reserve of Piacenza on 15 August 2010, for 2010–11 Lega Pro Prima Divisione club Barletta. Baraldo played 4 time for the Apulia-based club: twice in the league as the substitutes of D'Allocco and Anselmi respectively; Baraldo was the starting fullback for the club in 2010–11 Coppa Italia Lega Pro (2 out of possible 6 matches). Baraldo also received recall from national youth team for 2011 UEFA European Under-19 Football Championship qualification, despite he was cut from the 23-men preliminary squad to the final 18-men squad. On 17 November 2010 Barletta announced that Baraldo would return to Piacenza once the January transfer window opens. On 31 January 2011 Baraldo was signed by Empoli. However he only played once for their reserve. Baraldo returned to Piacenza on 1 July 2011 which the club had relegated to 2011–12 Lega Pro Prima Divisione; Baraldo played for the club at 2011–12 Coppa Italia Lega Pro.
