= Alessandro Scialpi =

Italian footballer (born 1992)

Personal information
- Date of birth: 23 February 1992 (age 34)
- Place of birth: Gallipoli, Italy
- Height: 1.83 m (6 ft 0 in)
- Position: Midfielder

Team information
- Current team: Gallipoli
- Number: 10

Youth career
- –2010: Lecce
- 2009–2010: → Genoa (loan)
- 2010–2012: Varese

Senior career*
Years	Team	Apps	(Gls)
2011–2012	Varese	2	(0)
2012	→ Carpi (loan)	1	(0)
2012–2014	Como	21	(1)
2014	→ Melfi (loan)	12	(0)
2014–2015	Venezia	13	(0)
2015	Martina	0	(0)
2015–2016	Virtus Francavilla	2	(0)
2016–2017	Gragnano		
2017–2018	Gallipoli		
2018–2019	Barletta		
2019–2020	Molfetta		
2020–2021	Nardò	27	(3)
2021–2022	Corato		
2021–2022	→ Gallipoli (loan)		
2022–	Gallipoli	2	(0)

International career
2008	Italy U16	7	(1)
2008–2009	Italy U17	11	(0)
2009–2010	Italy U18	6	(1)
2010–2011	Italy U19	2	(0)
- * Club domestic league appearances and goals as of 17 September 2023

Alessandro Scialpi (born 23 February 1992) is an Italian footballer who plays for Serie D club Gallipoli.

== Biography ==
Born in Gallipoli, the Province of Lecce, Apulia, Scialpi started his career at Lecce. He left for Serie A club Genoa in a temporary deal in summer 2009, but returned to southern Italy in January 2010. That season he was a player of the reserve teams for both Genoa and Lecce.

=== Varese ===
In summer 2010, Scialpi once again moved to northern Italy for Varese. Lecce gave Varese half of the registration rights for a peppercorn of €500 in order to farm out the player. In January 2012 Scialpi left the reserve team for Carpi. However, he only played once in 2011–12 Lega Pro Prima Divisione. In June 2012 Varese acquired all the registration rights from Lecce.

=== Como ===
In July 2012 Scialpi left for another third level club Como along with Alex Benvenga and Paolo Marchi. He was transferred to Venezia in August 2014.

=== Lega Pro clubs ===
Scialpi was a player for Venezia in 2014–15 Lega Pro. The team was expelled from professional league after the season due to financial difficulties.

On 25 July 2015 Scialpi was signed by Martina. However, he was released on 4 December.

=== International career ===
Scialpi capped twice for Italy national under-17 football team in 2009 UEFA European Under-17 Football Championship elite qualification. He was substituted at half time in the first round (by Leonardo Bianchi) and entered the field in the 54th minute of the third round as the replacement of Alberto Libertazzi. Scialpi missed the final tournament in May due to injury as well as a tournament in Saarland in September 2008 and the U17 Euro qualification. Scialpi played 5 times in October at 2009 FIFA U-17 World Cup.
