= Giacomo Venturi =

Italian footballer

Personal information
- Date of birth: 2 January 1992 (age 34)
- Place of birth: Faenza, Italy
- Height: 1.83 m (6 ft 0 in)
- Position: Goalkeeper

Team information
- Current team: Ravenna
- Number: 22

Youth career
- Bologna

Senior career*
Years	Team	Apps	(Gls)
2011–2014	Bologna	0	(0)
2011–2012	→ Bellaria (loan)	37	(0)
2012–2013	→ Gubbio (loan)	29	(0)
2013–2014	→ San Marino (loan)	16	(0)
2014–2015	Cremonese	6	(0)
2015–2016	Vis Pesaro	17	(0)
2016–2019	Ravenna	97	(0)
2019–2023	Reggiana	80	(0)
2023–2024	Casertana	38	(0)
2024–2025	Gubbio	37	(0)
2025–2026	Arezzo	35	(0)
2026–	Ravenna	0	(0)

International career^{‡}
2012	Italy U20	1	(0)
- * Club domestic league appearances and goals as of 30 April 2026 ‡ National team caps and goals as of 1 July 2013

Giacomo Venturi (born 2 January 1992) is an Italian professional footballer who plays as a goalkeeper for Serie C Group B club Ravenna.

== Biography ==
Born in Faenza, Emilia–Romagna, Venturi started his career at Bologna. He was the reserve team keeper from 2007 to 2011. On 25 July 2011 Venturi left for Bellaria – Igea Marina in temporary deal. Venturi played 37 out of possible 38 match for the club in 2011–12 Lega Pro Seconda Divisione. Venturi also received a first team shirt number in 2010–11 Serie A.

On 17 July 2012 Venturi received a call-up from Gubbio.

On 10 July 2013 Venturi left for San Marino Calcio in temporary deal, along with Gianluca Draghetti and Manuel Gavilán. Venturi made his debut in the first round of 2013–14 Coppa Italia Lega Pro.

On 10 July 2014 he was signed by Cremonese on free transfer.

On 2 August 2019 he signed a two-year contract with Reggiana.

On 15 July 2024, Venturi returned to Gubbio.

=== International career ===
Venturi started his national team career in 2005 Christmas Youth Event. He was one of the few born 1992 players in that event, which was intend for 1990 and 1991 players. In 2007, he entered another training camp for born 1992–93 players. He finally entered the Italy national under-17 football team in November 2008. However, he did not made his debut. In the new season Venturi received a call-up to Italy national under-18 football team. He also travelled to Nigeria with U17 team (de facto U18 team of 2009–10 season or U17 in 2008–09 season) for 2009 FIFA U-17 World Cup. He did not play any game either, which Mattia Perin was the first choice. Venturi received a call-up for goalkeeper training camp after returned from Africa in November 2009. However Venturi only received another call-up a year later in 2010 goalkeeper training camp.

Venturi finally returned to national youth team in December 2011 for Italy national under-20 football team. The unofficial charity match U20 beat Italy U21 Serie B 1–0. In January 2012 he received a call-up against Macedonia. In February Venturi was dropped as Perin returned to the squad. However, in April Perin withdrew from the squad again and Venturi was re-called. The match Venturi substituted Alessandro Iacobucci at half time. Italy had a clean sheet in the second half and beat Denmark 3–1.
