= Wilson Cuero =

Colombian footballer (born 1992)

Personal information
- Full name: Wilson Antonio Cuero Llano
- Date of birth: 27 January 1992 (age 34)
- Place of birth: Cali, Colombia
- Height: 1.78 m (5 ft 10 in)
- Position: Forward

Team information
- Current team: Mensajero
- Number: 22

Youth career
- 2007–2009: Millonarios

Senior career*
Years	Team	Apps	(Gls)
2009	Millonarios	3	(0)
2010–2016	Granada B	111	(27)
2011–2012	→ Cádiz B (loan)	36	(15)
2011–2012	→ Cádiz (loan)	1	(0)
2012–2013	→ San Roque (loan)	34	(11)
2015	→ Cádiz (loan)	12	(1)
2016–2017	Murcia	14	(0)
2017	Lorca Deportiva	15	(3)
2017–2018	Linense	33	(7)
2018–2019	Mineros de Guayana	34	(6)
2019	Alianza Petrolera	7	(0)
2020	Algeciras	6	(0)
2020–2021	Villanovense	22	(1)
2021–2022	Mensajero	8	(0)
2022	Calvo Sotelo	14	(2)
2022–2023	Pulpileño	31	(5)
2023–2024	Arenas Armilla	24	(6)
- * Club domestic league appearances and goals as of 14 April 2024

Wilson Antonio Cuero Llano (born 27 January 1992) is a Colombian footballer who plays as a forward.

== Career ==
Born in Cali, Valle del Cauca Department, Cuero graduated from Millonarios' youth setup. He made his professional debut on 15 February 2009, starting in a 1–1 home draw against Deportes Quindío.

On 24 July 2009 Cuero signed a deal with Udinese Calcio, being effective only in January of the following year. In April 2010 he joined Udinese's partner club Granada CF, being assigned to the reserves in the regional leagues.

In July 2011 Cuero was loaned to Cádiz CF, but appeared mainly with the B-team. On 31 August of the following year he moved to CD San Roque de Lepe also in a temporary deal.

Cuero returned to the Andalusians in June 2013, and renewed his link with the club on 9 October 2014. On 4 August of the following year he was loaned back to Cádiz, now to the main squad.
