= Mohammed Goyi Aliyu =

Nigerian football player

Mohammed Aliyu
Personal information
- Full name: Mohammed Goyi Aliyu
- Date of birth: February 12, 1993 (age 33)
- Place of birth: Kachia, Nigeria
- Height: 1.78 m (5 ft 10 in)
- Position: Left-back

Youth career
- Lima Primary School
- 2008–2010: Niger Tornadoes
- 2010–2011: Villarreal
- 2011–2013: Tavriya Simferopol

Senior career*
Years	Team	Apps	(Gls)
2013–2014	Tavriya Simferopol	4	(0)
2014	Pomorac	8	(0)
2014–2017	Saxan	33	(1)
2017	Dinamo Tbilisi	2	(0)

International career^{‡}
2009	Nigeria U-17	7	(0)
2011–2013	Nigeria U-20	12	(0)
- * Club domestic league appearances and goals as of 4 November 2017 ‡ National team caps and goals as of 18 July 2017

Mohammed Goyi Aliyu (born February 12, 1993) is a Nigerian football player.

== Career ==
Aliyu began to play football at Lima Primary School and joined in 2008 to Niger Tornadoes who earned his first professional matches. In January 2011 left Nigerian club Niger Tornadoes and signed for Primera División side Villarreal C.F. On December 13, 2011, he signed a long-term contract for Ukrainian Premier League club Tavriya.

== International career ==
He was called from Sam John Obuh for the Nigeria national under-17 football team for the 2009 FIFA U-17 World Cup. Obuh called the defender on 12 April 2011 for the 2011 African Youth Championship in South Africa.
