= John Felagha =

Nigerian footballer (1994–2020)

Personal information
- Full name: John Felagha
- Date of birth: 27 July 1994
- Place of birth: Lagos, Nigeria
- Date of death: 31 August 2020 (aged 26)
- Place of death: Senegal
- Height: 1.80 m (5 ft 11 in)
- Position: Goalkeeper

Youth career
- 2008–2012: Aspire Academy

Senior career*
Years	Team	Apps	(Gls)
2012–2013	K.A.S. Eupen	2	(0)

International career
2013	Nigeria U20	1	(0)
- * Club domestic league appearances and goals

John Felagha (27 July 1994 – 31 August 2020) was a Nigerian footballer who played as a goalkeeper. He died on 31 August 2020 in Senegal.

== Career statistics ==
=== Club ===
Club	Season	League			Cup		Continental		Other		Total	
Club	Season	Division	Apps	Goals	Apps	Goals	Apps	Goals	Apps	Goals	Apps	Goals
K.A.S. Eupen	2012–13	Belgian Second Division	2	0	0	0	–		0	0	2	0
Career total			2	0	0	0	0	0	0	0	2	0
