= Ensar Bajramlić =

Serbian footballer

Personal information
- Full name: Ensar Bajramlić
- Date of birth: 16 February 1997 (age 29)
- Place of birth: Novi Pazar, FR Yugoslavia
- Height: 1.83 m (6 ft 0 in)
- Position: Midfielder

Youth career
- AS Novi Pazar
- Novi Pazar

Senior career*
Years	Team	Apps	(Gls)
2015–2019	Novi Pazar	7	(0)
2016–2017	→ Jošanica (loan)	24	(0)
2020–	Balestier Khalsa	1	(0)

International career
2015	Serbia U19	0	(0)
- * Club domestic league appearances and goals as of 7 March 2018

Ensar "Điđi" Bajramlić (Serbian Cyrillic: Енсар Бајрамлић; born 16 February 1997) is a Serbian professional footballer who plays as a midfielder.

== Career ==
=== Novi Pazar ===
As one of the most perspective players of Novi Pazar youth team, Bajramlić joined the first team squad in summer 2015. He made his Serbian SuperLiga debut in the 2015–16 season, on 21 May 2016, in an away match against Metalac Gornji Milanovac, when he replaced Dino Šarac in the 85th minute.

=== Balstier Khalsa ===
He joined Balestier Khalsa FC of Singapore for the 2020 Singapore Premier League season. Bajramlić made his debut for the Tigers in a narrow 1–0 defeat to Tampines Rovers in their season opener, where he could have snatched a point for his team in the dying minutes of the game.
