= Alieu Darbo =

Gambian footballer

Personal information
- Full name: Alieu Darbo
- Date of birth: 3 August 1992 (age 34)
- Place of birth: Angered, Sweden
- Height: 1.83 m (6 ft 0 in)
- Positions: Attacking midfielder; winger

Youth career
- 2006–2009: Örgryte
- 2009–2012: Le Mans

Senior career*
Years	Team	Apps	(Gls)
2013	Dinamo Zagreb	0	(0)
2014	Inter Turku	0	(0)
2015	Mosta	5	(0)
2015	MC Oran	0	(0)
2016	Ittihad Alexandria	3	(0)
2016	Naxxar Lions	5	(0)
2017	CA Bizertin	0	(0)

International career
2009	Gambia U17	3	(0)
2011	Gambia U20	2	(0)
- * Club domestic league appearances and goals

Alieu Darbo (born 3 August 1992) is a professional footballer who plays as an attacking midfielder or winger. Born in Sweden to Gambian parents, he has represented Gambia at the international youth level. He appeared as an unused substitute for Gambia national football team once in 2012.

== Club career ==
Darbo started his career in Sweden, then moved to France with Le Mans FC. He was the member of their under-19 team in 2010.

=== England, Croatia and Finland ===
Darbo went on trial with Sunderland and Newcastle United in 2012, and signed a three-year contract with Wigan Athletic in June 2012. This was later refuted by the club. Vital Football even reported the signing was made up by the footballer himself.

In August 2013 Darbo signed for Croatian side GNK Dinamo Zagreb. Despite being injured, he was included in the club's 23 man squad for the Europa League and given a two-year contract extension in September. He was released in December 2013, having been at Dinamo for just four months, without making any debut for the club.

In January 2014 he played once for Inter Turku in the second leg derby against TPS in 2014 Finnish League Cup group stage.

=== Italy, Sweden, Norway ===
On 12 July 2014 Italian club F.C. Crotone announced the signing of Darbo. However, the contract was terminated on 19 July after the club announced there was some miscommunication with his agent.

Later in July 2014 he was presented as a player of Swedish second-tier side Landskrona BoIS. The deal soon collapsed.

In January 2015 he was presented as a player for Norwegian club Nybergsund. However, this deal, too, soon collapsed.

=== Malta, Algeria, Egypt, Malta again & Tunisia ===
In February 2015, he signed a three-month contract with Maltese Premier League side Mosta FC. Darbo made his debut for the club in a 3–1 FA Trophy loss against Valletta, being replaced after 71 minutes. In June 2015, Darbo signed a two-year contract with Algerian club MC Oran.

In January 2016 he moved to Egypt for Ittihad Alexandria. He made his debut on 6 February against Wadi Degla (3–1 loss). He was released after four months, after he had featured only sporadically for the club in the 2015–16 season.

In the summer of 2016 he moved back to Malta for Maltese First Division club Naxxar Lions. He made his debut for the club on 11 September 2016 in a 2–0 loss against Pietà Hotspurs. He was released by Naxxar Lions in late 2016. Club president Pierre Sciberras said his contract had been terminated for disciplinary reasons, not for playing poorly.

He signed a contract with Tunisian Ligue Professionnelle 1 club CA Bizertin on 23 August 2017. After a couple of weeks, he was released without featuring for the club.

== International career ==
Darbo was part of the Gambia national under-17 football team that participated in the 2009 FIFA U-17 World Cup in Nigeria, where he was assigned the number 10 jersey. He played in all three of his nation's games in the World Cup, losses against Iran and the Netherlands before a 2–2 draw with Colombia.

In June 2012, at the age of 19, Darbo was included in the matchday squad for the senior national team's 2014 FIFA World Cup qualifier against Morocco. He was an unused substitute in that game.
