= Igor Mijatović =

Swiss footballer (born 1992)

Personal information
- Date of birth: 21 November 1992 (age 33)
- Place of birth: Geneva, Switzerland
- Height: 1.81 m (5 ft 11 in)
- Position: Forward

Team information
- Current team: Biaschesi

Youth career
- 2006–2010: Bellinzona

Senior career*
Years	Team	Apps	(Gls)
2010–2012	Bellinzona	2	(0)
2010–2011	→ Locarno (loan)	11	(1)
2012–	Biaschesi	0	(0)

International career^{‡}
2009	Switzerland U17	6	(0)
2010	Switzerland U19	3	(1)
- * Club domestic league appearances and goals as of 28 July 2012 ‡ National team caps and goals as of 28 July 2012

Igor Mijatović (born 21 November 1992) is a Swiss professional footballer currently playing for GC Biaschesi.

== Club career ==
Mijatović began his playing career with AC Bellinzona and rose through the youth ranks at the club. He made his debut on 2 May 2010 against FC Basel, coming on as a late substitute. He was unable to establish himself in their first team and went on loan to FC Locarno for the 2010–2011 season. He made his debut for Locarno on 26 July 2010 against FC Aarau. He scored his first and only goal during his loan in a 3–1 home loss to FC Vaduz on 22 August 2010. Mijatović returned to Bellinzona but could still not break into the first team and thus moved to GC Biaschesi on a free transfer in July 2012.

== International career ==
Mijatović was a Switzerland youth international at under-17 and under-19 level. In 2009, he was part of the Swiss under-17 team that won the 2009 FIFA U-17 World Cup beating the host nation Nigeria 1–0 in the final. Mijatović featured as a substitute in two matches at the tournament, victories in the final group game against Brazil and the semi-final versus Colombia.

== Honours ==
- FIFA U-17 World Cup: 2009
