= Joaquín Pucheta =

Argentine footballer (born 1992)

Personal information
- Full name: Jorge Joaquín Pucheta
- Date of birth: 9 June 1992 (age 34)
- Place of birth: Villa Ángela, Argentina
- Height: 1.84 m (6 ft 0 in)
- Position: Goalkeeper

Team information
- Current team: Cumbayá
- Number: 1

Youth career
- CSyD Sampdoria
- 2002–2010: Lanús

Senior career*
Years	Team	Apps	(Gls)
2010–2013	Lanús	0	(0)
2013–2014	Tristán Suárez	0	(0)
2014	Los Andes	0	(0)
2015	Alvarado	19	(0)
2016–2018	Estudiantes	62	(0)
2018–2020	All Boys	66	(0)
2021	Macará	22	(0)
2022–	Cumbayá	15	(1)
- * Club domestic league appearances and goals as of 14:21, 6 June 2022 (UTC)

Jorge Joaquín Pucheta (born 9 June 1992) is an Argentine professional footballer who plays as a goalkeeper for Cumbayá FC.

== Club career ==
Pucheta, having joined their youth in 2002 from CSyD Sampdoria, began his senior career with Lanús, becoming a first-team member from the 2010–11 season - though wouldn't feature competitively for the Primera División team. Pucheta signed for Tristán Suárez in 2013, prior to securing a contract with Los Andes a year later. After no appearances for either of the Primera B Metropolitana outfits, Pucheta moved across to Torneo Federal A - the other third tier - to join Alvarado in 2015. He made his senior debut on 22 March against Independiente, which was the first of nineteen total appearances. Estudiantes signed Pucheta in 2016.

On 8 July 2018, having featured seventy-one times across three campaigns for Estudiantes, Pucheta joined fellow Primera B Metropolitana side All Boys. He participated in his opening matches for them in August against San Miguel, Fénix and Sacachispas. His first year there ended with promotion to Primera B Nacional. He subsequently appeared twenty times in the curtailed 2019–20 season, before featuring four times in the early stages of 2020. On 25 December 2020, Pucheta was announced as a new signing for 2021 by Ecuadorian Serie A side Macará. In February 2022, he signed fellow league club Cumbayá FC.

== International career ==
Pucheta was selected by José Luis Brown for the 2009 FIFA U-17 World Cup in Nigeria, though didn't play as they reached the round of sixteen; they were eliminated by Colombia.

== Personal life ==
Pucheta's sister, Ailen, is also a footballer; she played for Lanús' women's team.

== Career statistics ==
As of 25 December 2020.

Appearances and goals by club, season and competition
Club	Season	League			Cup		League Cup		Continental		Other		Total	
Club	Season	Division	Apps	Goals	Apps	Goals	Apps	Goals	Apps	Goals	Apps	Goals	Apps	Goals
Lanús	2010–11	Primera División	0	0	0	0	—		—		0	0	0	0
Lanús	2011–12	Primera División	0	0	0	0	—		0	0	0	0	0	0
Lanús	2012–13	Primera División	0	0	0	0	—		0	0	0	0	0	0
Lanús	Total		0	0	0	0	—		0	0	0	0	0	0
Tristán Suárez	2013–14	Primera B Metropolitana	0	0	0	0	—		—		0	0	0	0
Los Andes	2014	Primera B Metropolitana	0	0	0	0	—		—		0	0	0	0
Alvarado	2015	Torneo Federal A	19	0	0	0	—		—		0	0	19	0
Estudiantes	2016	Primera B Metropolitana	19	0	0	0	—		—		0	0	19	0
Estudiantes	2016–17	Primera B Metropolitana	35	0	2	0	—		—		3 (Note: Appearance(s) in the Primera B Metropolitana play-offs)	0	40	0
Estudiantes	2017–18	Primera B Metropolitana	8	0	0	0	—		—		4	0	12	0
Estudiantes	Total		62	0	2	0	—		—		7	0	71	0
All Boys	2018–19	Primera B Metropolitana	42	0	1	0	—		—		0	0	43	0
All Boys	2019–20	Primera B Nacional	20	0	0	0	—		—		0	0	20	0
All Boys	2020	Primera B Nacional	4	0	0	0	—		—		0	0	4	0
All Boys	Total		66	0	0	0	—		—		0	0	66	0
Macará	2021	Serie A	0	0	0	0	—		0	0	0	0	0	0
Career total			147	0	3	0	—		0	0	7	0	157	0
