= Guy Eschmann =

Swiss footballer (born 1992)

Personal information
- Full name: Guy Roger Eschmann Bassono
- Date of birth: 10 June 1992 (age 34)
- Place of birth: Togo
- Positions: Midfielder; forward

Senior career*
| Years | Team | Apps | (Gls) |
| -2009/10 | Neuchâtel Xamax FCS | 0 | (0) |
| 2010/2011 | RCD Mallorca | 0 | (0) |
| 2011/2012 | FC Thun | 0 | (0) |
| 2012/2013 | Hapoel Petah Tikva F.C. | 8 | (0) |
| 2013 | Fylkir | 7 | (0) |
| 2013/2014 | SK Slavia Prague | 1 | (0) |
| 2014/2015 | FC Locarno | | |
| 2015/2016 | F.C.V. Dender E.H. | 2 | (0) |
- Al-Mussanah Club
| -2019/20 | SC Young Fellows Juventus | | |
| 2020/21 | Zug 94 | | |
| 2020/21 | FC Dietikon | | |
| 2021/22 | FV Lörrach-Brombach | 14 | (5) |
- * Club domestic league appearances and goals

Guy Roger Eschmann Bassono (born 10 June 1992) is a footballer who plays as a midfielder. Born in Togo, he is a naturalised citizen of Switzerland.

== Career ==
Adopted by Swiss parents at the age of 7, Eschmann took part in the 2009 UEFA European Under-17 Championship, but was unable to participate in that year's FIFA U-17 World Cup, which Switzerland won, because to injury.

After failing to make an appearance with RCD Mallorca in the Spanish top flight and a stint in Israel, he signed for Fylkir in Iceland. There, the coach told Eschmann that English and Dutch clubs watched the island and that he reminded him of Aron Jóhannsson, who signed for Dutch team AZ Alkmaar from Iceland.

By 2020, Eschmann was in the process of establishing a football academy in Oman, due to "football there being 20 years behind".
