= Kim Young-seung =

South Korean footballer

Personal information
- Date of birth: 22 February 1993 (age 33)
- Place of birth: South Korea
- Height: 1.82 m (6 ft 0 in)
- Positions: Defender; forward

Youth career
- 2008–2010: Shingal High School
- 2011: Hanyang University
- 2011–2012: Sevilla U19
- 2013: Howon University

Senior career*
Years	Team	Apps	(Gls)
2014–2015	Daejeon Hana Citizen	6	(1)
- * Club domestic league appearances and goals

Kim Young-seung Korean: 김영승; born 22 February 1993) is a South Korean retired footballer who is last known to have played as a defender or forward for Daejeon Hana Citizen.

== Career ==
=== Club career ===
As a youth player, Kim joined the youth academy of Spanish La Liga side Sevilla but left due to injury. Before the 2014 season, he signed for Daejeon Hana Citizen in the South Korean second division, where he made 6 appearances and scored 1 goal, helping them earn promotion to the South Korean top flight. On 21 June 2014, Kim debuted for Daejeon Hana Citizen during a 3–2 win over Daegu FC. On 16 November 2014, he scored his first goal for Daejeon Hana Citizen during a 1–1 draw with Chungnam Asan FC.

=== International career ===
Kim represented South Korea at the 2009 FIFA U-17 World Cup.
