= Choi Bong-jin =

South Korean footballer (born 1992)

Personal information
- Full name: Choi Bong-jin
- Date of birth: 6 April 1992 (age 34)
- Place of birth: South Korea
- Height: 1.93 m (6 ft 4 in)
- Position: Goalkeeper

Team information
- Current team: Jeonnam Dragons
- Number: 1

Youth career
- 2011–2014: Chung-Ang University

Senior career*
Years	Team	Apps	(Gls)
2015	Gyeongnam FC	0	(0)
2015–2017	Gwangju FC	40	(0)
2018–2019	→ Asan Mugunghwa (army)	16	(0)
2019	Gwangju FC	2	(0)
2020	Bucheon FC 1995	25	(0)
2021–2022	Suwon FC	0	(0)
2022	Gimpo FC	11	(0)
2023–	Jeonnam Dragons	77	(0)
- * Club domestic league appearances and goals as of 8 August 2026

Choi Bong-jin (Korean: 최봉진; born 6 April 1992) is a South Korean footballer who plays as goalkeeper for Jeonnam Dragons in K League 2.

== Early life ==
Choi was born in South Korea. He went to Chung-Ang University.

== Career ==
Choi joined K League Challenge side Gyeongnam FC in January 2015. He didn't make any appearances for the team and was only named on the bench.

In July 2016, Choi was transferred to Gwangju FC in exchange for Ryu Beom-hee. He made his debut for Gwangju against Daejeon Hana Citizen on the 19th of August 2015.

Choi joined Asan for military service and made his debut for the club against Bucheon FC 1995 on 11 November 2018.

Choi rejoined Gwangju in 2019 and made his debut against Suwon Samsung Bluewings on the 27 October 2019.

Choi made his debut for Bucheon against Chungnam Asan on 10 May 2020.

Choi joined Suwon in 2021 but didn't make any appearances for the club.

Choi made his debut for Gimpo against Busan IPark on 27 March 2022.

Choi made his debut for Jeonnam against Seoul E-Land FC on 11 March 2023.

== Honours ==
Asan Mugunghwa

- K League 2: 2018

Gwangju

- K League 2: 2019
