= Leonardo Bianchi (footballer) =

Italian footballer

Personal information
- Date of birth: 28 January 1992 (age 34)
- Place of birth: Sinalunga, Italy
- Height: 1.79 m (5 ft 10 in)
- Position: Midfielder

Team information
- Current team: Scandicci

Youth career
- Empoli

Senior career*
Years	Team	Apps	(Gls)
2012–2015	Empoli	0	(0)
2012–2013	→ Pisa (loan)	0	(0)
2013	→ Rimini (loan)	7	(0)
2013–2014	→ Gavorrano (loan)	28	(3)
2014–2015	→ Lucchese (loan)	3	(0)
2015	Rieti	0	(0)
2015–2016	Jolly Montemurlo	11	(0)
2016–2019	Pianese	101	(6)
2019–	Scandicci	0	(0)

International career
2008–2009	Italy U17	12	(0)
2009–2010	Italy U18	7	(0)
2010–2011	Italy U19	6	(0)
- * Club domestic league appearances and goals as of 24 November 2019

Leonardo Bianchi (born 28 January 1992) is an Italian footballer who plays as a midfielder for Scandicci.

== Club career ==
Born in Sinalunga, Tuscany, Bianchi started his career at Tuscan club Empoli. From 2010 and 2012 Bianchi was the member of the reserve. Bianchi also received call-up to 2011 and 2012 pre-season camp of the first team; he wore no.17 shirt for 2011–12 Serie B, previously owned by Antonio Tognarelli. In late July 2012 Bianchi left for Pisa. However, after no league appearance, Bianchi was signed by Rimini in a temporary deal in January 2013.

On 8 August 2013, Bianchi, along with Gregorio Mazzanti and Claudio Santini, were signed by Gavorrano in a co-ownership deal. In June 2014 Empoli bought back Bianchi.

In summer 2014, he was signed by Lucchese.

On 20 December 2019 he moved to Serie D club Scandicci.

== International career ==
Bianchi was a member of the Italy under-17 team at the 2009 UEFA European Under-17 Football Championship (where he played in 3 games), at the 2009 FIFA U-17 World Cup (playing in 2 games) and at the 2011 UEFA European Under-19 Football Championship qualification (appearing in all 3 games). Bianchi also received call-up to a training camp in the summer of 2007 for under-15 and under-14 player, however Bianchi was never promoted to the Italy under-16 team of 2007–08 season until he was recalled to the under-17 team in November 2008, after Italy had qualified from the first qualifying round.
