= Bienvenue Basala-Mazana =

German footballer

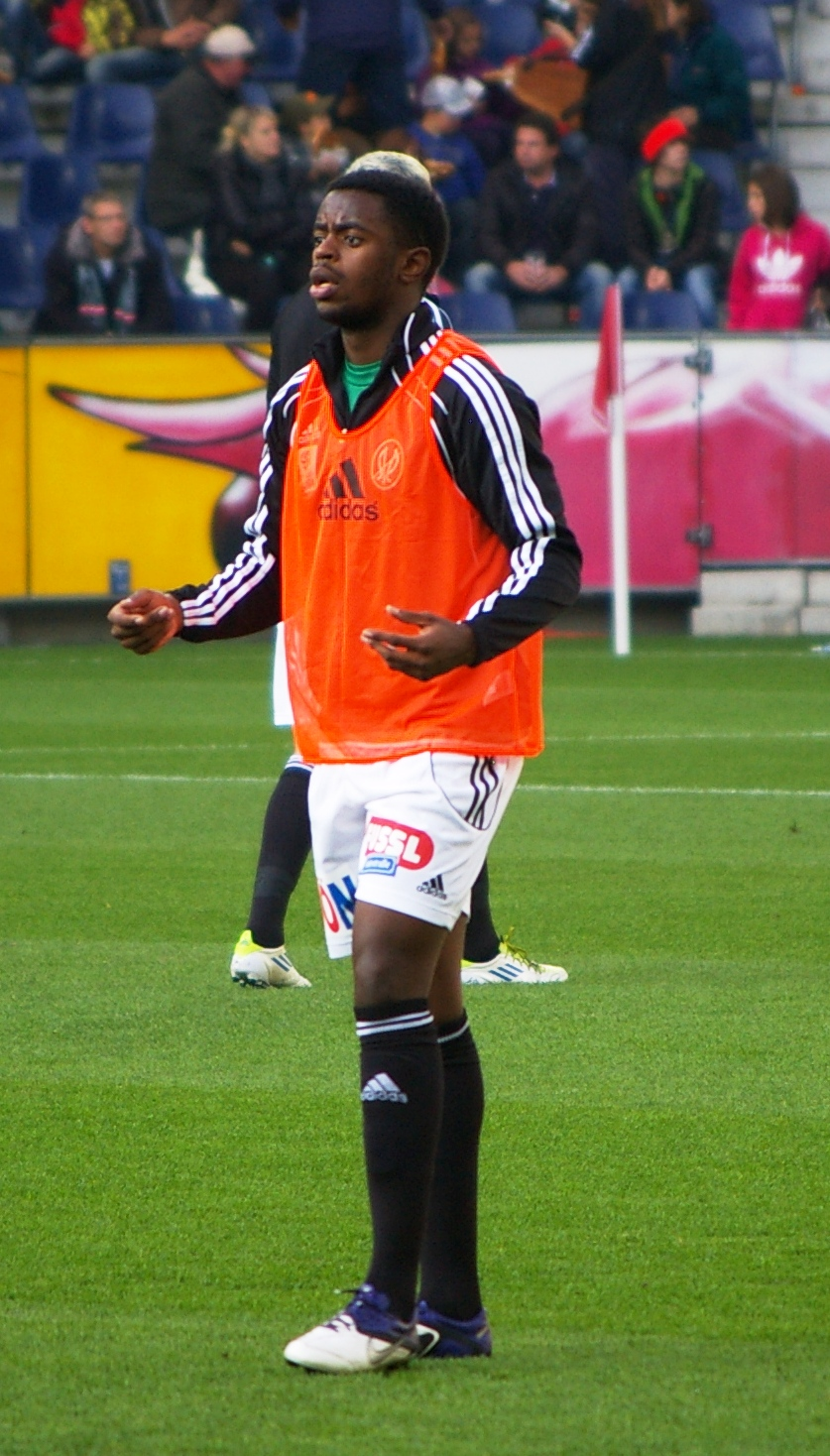
- Basala-Mazana with SV Ried

Personal information
- Date of birth: 2 January 1992 (age 34)
- Place of birth: Bonn, Germany
- Height: 1.83 m (6 ft 0 in)
- Position: Right-back

Youth career
- –2004: 1.FC Ringsdorf-Godesberg
- 2004–2010: 1. FC Köln

Senior career*
Years	Team	Apps	(Gls)
2010–2014	1. FC Köln II	54	(1)
2011–2013	1. FC Köln	0	(0)
2011–2012	→ SV Ried (loan)	20	(0)
2016–2017	Alcobaça	0	(0)
2017	Berliner AK 07	0	(0)
2020	Viktoria Arnoldsweiler		

International career
2007–2008	Germany U16	9	(0)
2008–2009	Germany U17	18	(1)
2009–2010	Germany U18	4	(1)
2010–2011	Germany U19	4	(0)
2011	Germany U20	1	(0)
Medal record
Men's football
Representing Germany
UEFA European Under-17 Championship
Winner	2009 Germany
- * Club domestic league appearances and goals

Bienvenue Basala-Mazana (born 2 January 1992) is a German former professional footballer who played as a right-back.

== Club career ==
Basala-Mazana won the 2009 UEFA European Under-17 Championship with the Germany U17 national team.

In January 2020, he returned to the pitch after three years without a club, signing with German amateur club FC 08 Viktoria Arnoldsweiler.

== Honours ==
Germany U17

- UEFA European Under-17 Championship: 2009
