= 2009 UEFA European Under-17 Championship =

U-17-Fußball-Europameisterschaft 2009

Tournament details
- Host country: Germany
- Dates: 6–18 May
- Teams: 8 (from 1 confederation)
- Venues: 13 (in 13 host cities)

Final positions
- Champions: Germany (3rd title)
- Runners-up: Netherlands

Tournament statistics
- Matches played: 15
- Goals scored: 33 (2.2 per match)
- Attendance: 83,638 (5,576 per match)
- Top scorer(s): (Germany) Lennart Thy (Netherlands) Luc Castaignos (3 goals each)
- Best player: (Germany) Mario Götze

The 2009 UEFA European Under-17 Championship was the eighth edition of UEFA's European Under-17 Football Championship since it was renamed from the original under-16 event, in 2001. Germany hosted the championship, during 6 to 18 May 2009, in thirteen venues, and the final took place at the Stadion Magdeburg, in Magdeburg. Spain was the current title holder, having successfully defended its 2007 title. The top 6 teams qualified for the 2009 FIFA U-17 World Cup.

== Qualification ==
The final tournament of the 2009 UEFA European Under-17 Championship was preceded by two qualification stages: a qualifying round and an Elite round. During these rounds, 52 national teams competed to determine the seven teams to join the already qualified host nation Germany.

== Participants ==
- England
- France
- Italy
- Netherlands
- Spain
- Switzerland
- Turkey
- Germany (as hosts)

== Group stage ==
Key to colours in group tables
Advanced to semi-finals and qualified for 2009 FIFA U-17 World Cup
Qualified for 2009 FIFA U-17 World Cup

=== Group A ===
Team	Pld	W	D	L	GF	GA	GD	Pts
Switzerland	3	1	2	0	4	2	+2	5
Italy	3	1	1	1	3	4	−1	4
Spain	3	0	3	0	0	0	0	3
France	3	0	2	1	2	3	−1	2

6 May 2009
11:00 CET

Spain	0–0	Italy
	Report

Paul Greifzu Stadium, Dessau-Roßlau
Attendance: 2,873
Referee: Vladislav Bezborodov (Russia)
6 May 2009
11:00 CET

France	1–1	Switzerland
Situ 76'	Report	Ben Khalifa 59'

Stadion am Bad, Markranstädt
Attendance: 2,200
Referee: Tom Harald Hagen (Norway)

9 May 2009
12:00 CET

Spain	0–0	France
	Report

Stadion der Freundschaft, Grimma
Attendance: 2,500
Referee: Gerhard Grobelnik (Austria)
9 May 2009
14:00 CET

Italy	1–3	Switzerland
Beretta 31'	Report	Nimely 29' (pen.); Gonçalves 65'; Kamber 74'

Hafenstadion, Torgau
Attendance: 2,550
Referee: Georgios Daloukas (Greece)

12 May 2009
11:00 CET

Switzerland	0–0	Spain
	Report

Sport- und Freizeitzentrum, Sandersdorf
Attendance: 4,550
Referee: Milorad Mažić (Serbia)
12 May 2009
11:00 CET

Italy	2–1	France
Dell'Agnello 38'; Sini 50' (pen.)	Report	Kebano 18'

Sportzentrum Taucha, Taucha
Attendance: 2,300
Referee: Paweł Gil (Poland)

=== Group B ===
Team	Pld	W	D	L	GF	GA	GD	Pts
Germany	3	3	0	0	9	1	+8	9
Netherlands	3	1	1	1	3	4	−1	4
Turkey	3	1	0	2	3	5	−2	3
England	3	0	1	2	1	6	−5	1

6 May 2009
11:00 CET

England	1–1	Netherlands
Garbutt 69'	Report	Özyakup 4'

Stadion der Freundschaft, Gera
Attendance: 4,600
Referee: Georgios Daloukas (Greece)
6 May 2009
18:15 CET

Germany	3–1	Turkey
Scheidhauer 11'; Buchtmann 51'; Mustafi 67'	Report	Sarı 10'

Steigerwaldstadion, Erfurt
Attendance: 5,107
Referee: Milorad Mažić (Serbia)

9 May 2009
14:00 CET

Turkey	1–2	Netherlands
Demir 65'	Report	Castaignos 40+1'; Ligeon 56'

Arena Meuselwitz, Meuselwitz
Attendance: 2,200
Referee: Tom Harald Hagen (Norway)
9 May 2009
14:00 CET

Germany	4–0	England
Labus 13'; Thy 37'; Scheidhauer 56'; Götze 74'	Report

Ernst-Abbe-Sportfeld, Jena
Attendance: 8,500
Referee: Paweł Gil (Poland)

12 May 2009
17:45 CET

Netherlands	0–2	Germany
	Report	Thy 35'; Janzer 44'

Ernst-Abbe-Sportfeld, Jena
Attendance: 6,831
Referee: Vladislav Bezborodov (Russia)
12 May 2009
17:45 CET

Turkey	1–0	England
Şeker 74'	Report

Volksparkstadion, Gotha
Attendance: 3,456
Referee: Gerhard Grobelnik (Austria)

== Knockout stage ==
=== Semi-finals ===
15 May 2009
11:00 CET

Switzerland	1–2	Netherlands
Kamber 52'	Report	Isoufi 17'; Castaignos 40'

Stadion der Freundschaft, Grimma
Attendance: 5,500
Referee: Tom Harald Hagen (Norway)

15 May 2009
17:45 CET

Germany	2–0	Italy
Yabo 70'; Basala-Mazana 76'	Report

Paul Greifzu Stadium, Dessau-Roßlau
Attendance: 6,471
Referee: Milorad Mažić (Serbia)

=== Final ===
18 May 2009
11:00 CET

Netherlands	1–2 (a.e.t.)	Germany
Castaignos 7'	Report	Thy 34'; Trinks 97'

Stadion Magdeburg, Magdeburg
Attendance: 24,000
Referee: Vladislav Bezborodov (Russia)

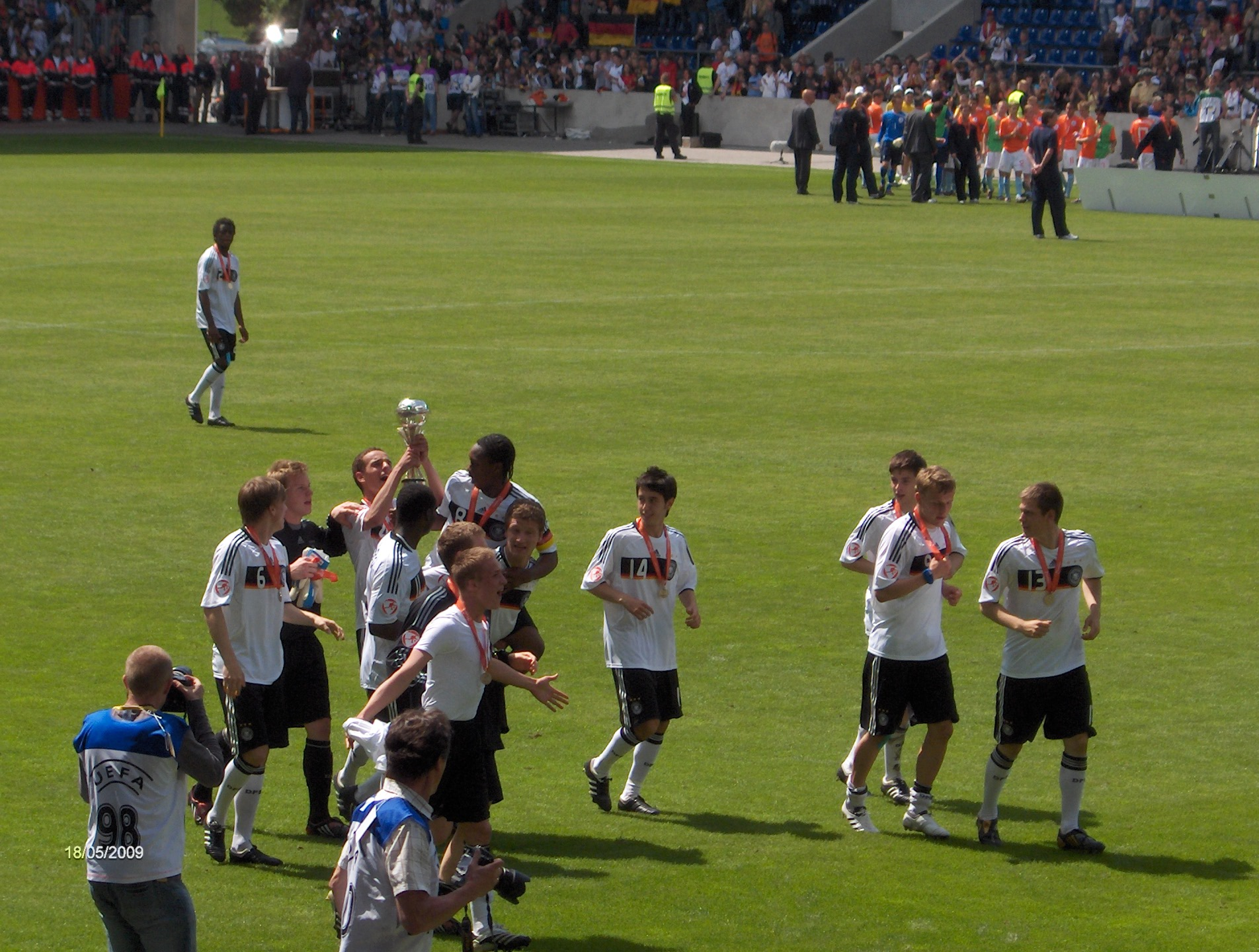
Champions Germany on their lap of honour

== Team of the Tournament ==
Goalkeepers	Defenders	Midfielders	Forwards
(Italy) Mattia Perin (Germany) Marc-André ter Stegen	(France) Dennis Appiah (Germany) Bienvenue Basala-Mazana (Netherlands) Stefan de Vrij (Switzerland) Janick Kamber (Spain) Marc Muniesa (Turkey) Furkan Şeker	(Italy) Stephan El Shaarawy (Spain) Álex Fernández (Italy) Marco Fossati (Netherlands) Shabir Isoufi (England) Jack Wilshere (Germany) Reinhold Yabo (Germany) Matthias Zimmermann	(Switzerland) Nassim Ben Khalifa (Italy) Giacomo Beretta (Netherlands) Luc Castaignos (Italy) Simone Dell'Agnello (Germany) Mario Götze (Germany) Lennart Thy

== Countries to participate in 2009 FIFA U-17 World Cup ==
- Switzerland
- Italy
- Spain
- Germany
- Netherlands
- Turkey
