= Mats van Huijgevoort =

Dutch footballer (born 1993)

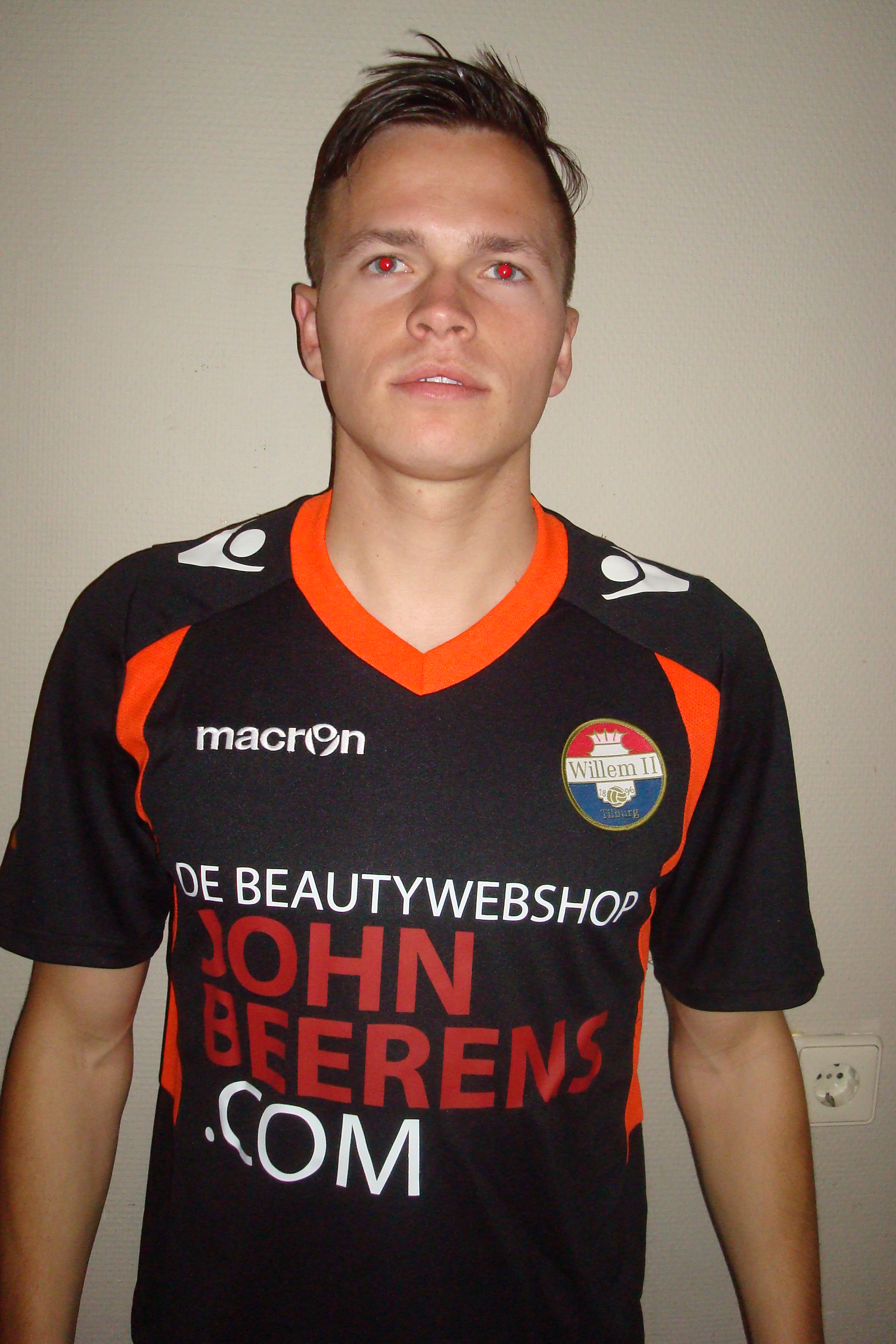
- Van Huijgevoort with Willem II in 2013

Personal information
- Full name: Martinus Franciscus van Huijgevoort
- Date of birth: 16 January 1993 (age 33)
- Place of birth: Loon op Zand, Netherlands
- Height: 1.85 m (6 ft 1 in)
- Position: Centre-back

Youth career
- –2003: Uno Animo
- 2003–2008: Willem II
- 2008–2011: Feyenoord

Senior career*
Years	Team	Apps	(Gls)
2011–2014	Feyenoord	1	(0)
2012–2013	→ Excelsior (loan)	11	(0)
2013–2014	→ Willem II (loan)	1	(0)
2014–2015	Den Bosch	31	(0)
2015–2018	Oss '20		
2018–2020	Kozakken Boys	36	(2)
2020–2022	Achilles Veen		

International career
2007–2008	Netherlands U15	5	(0)
2008–2009	Netherlands U16	4	(0)
2009–2010	Netherlands U17	17	(0)
2011–2012	Netherlands U19	9	(0)
- * Club domestic league appearances and goals

Martinus Franciscus "Mats" van Huijgevoort (born 16 January 1993) is a Dutch retired footballer who played as a centre-back.

== Club career ==
Hugely talented, he played professionally for Feyenoord, Excelsior, Willem II and FC Den Bosch. After his professional career, he played for OSS '20 and Kozakken Boys before moving to Achilles Veen in the Hoofdklasse from the 2020–21 season. He retired from football altogether in 2023, after having left Achilles Veen the year before.

== International career ==
Van Huijgevoort played for the Netherlands national under-18 football team.
