= Niko Opper =

German footballer

Personal information
- Date of birth: 4 February 1992 (age 34)
- Place of birth: Berlin, Germany
- Height: 1.80 m (5 ft 11 in)
- Position: Right back

Team information
- Current team: SC Hessen Dreieich
- Number: 29

Youth career
- SKG Ober-Beerbach
- Viktoria Griesheim
- SV Darmstadt 98
- –2011: Bayer Leverkusen

Senior career*
Years	Team	Apps	(Gls)
2011–2012	Bayer Leverkusen II	26	(1)
2012–2013	SV Babelsberg 03	5	(1)
2013–2015	Alemannia Aachen II	14	(1)
2013–2015	Alemannia Aachen	22	(1)
2015–	SC Hessen Dreieich	77	(3)

International career
2008–2009	Germany U-17	5	(0)
2009	Germany U-18	3	(0)
- * Club domestic league appearances and goals as of 23 May 2018

Niko Opper (born 4 February 1992) is a German footballer who currently plays for SC Hessen Dreieich.
