= Ensar Baykan =

Turkish footballer (born 1992)

Personal information
- Full name: Ensar Enes Baykan
- Date of birth: 22 January 1992 (age 34)
- Place of birth: Steinheim, Germany
- Height: 1.67 m (5 ft 6 in)
- Position: Midfielder

Youth career
- Borussia Dortmund
- –2008: SC Verl
- 2008–2011: Arminia Bielefeld

Senior career*
| Years | Team | Apps | (Gls) |
| 2010–2011 | Arminia Bielefeld II | 7 | (0) |
| 2010–2011 | Arminia Bielefeld | 7 | (0) |
| 2011–2013 | Borussia Dortmund II | 54 | (5) |
| 2013–2016 | Dardanelspor | 67 | (10) |
| 2016 | Şanlıurfaspor | 0 | (0) |
| 2016–2017 | Sarıyer | 28 | (5) |
| 2017–2019 | Fethiyespor | 27 | (2) |

International career
| 2009–2010 | Turkey U18 | 4 | (0) |
- * Club domestic league appearances and goals

Ensar Baykan (born 22 January 1992) is a Turkish footballer who plays as a midfielder.

== Career ==
On 6 July 2013, he joined Dardanelspor.
