= Switzerland national under-17 football team =

National association football team

Switzerland U-17
- Association: Swiss Football Association
- Confederation: UEFA (Europe)
- Head coach: Stefan Marini
- FIFA code: SUI
First colours	Second colours

World Cup
- Appearances: 2 (first in 2009)
- Best result: Champions (2009)

European Championships
- Appearances: 9 (first in 2002)
- Best result: Champions (2002)
Medal record
Men's football
FIFA U-17 World Cup
Gold medal – first place	2009 Nigeria	Team
UEFA U-17 European Championship
Gold medal – first place	2002 Denmark	Team
Bronze medal – third place	2009 Germany	Team

The Switzerland national under-17 football team is the national under-17 football team of Switzerland and is controlled by the Swiss Football Association. The team competes in the UEFA European Under-17 Championship and the FIFA U-17 World Cup. Their biggest success was winning the 2009 Under-17 World Cup in Nigeria.

== Competitive record ==
=== FIFA U-17 World Cup ===
Year	Round	GP	W	D	L	GS	GA
(China) 1985	Did not qualify						
(Canada) 1987	Did not qualify						
(Scotland) 1989	Did not qualify						
(Italy) 1991	Did not qualify						
(Japan) 1993	Did not qualify						
(Ecuador) 1995	Did not qualify						
(Egypt) 1997	Did not qualify						
(New Zealand) 1999	Did not qualify						
(Trinidad and Tobago) 2001	Did not qualify						
(Finland) 2003	Did not qualify						
(Peru) 2005	Did not qualify						
(South Korea) 2007	Did not qualify						
(Nigeria) 2009	Champions	7	7	0	0	18	7
(Mexico) 2011	Did not qualify						
(United Arab Emirates) 2013	Did not qualify						
(Chile) 2015	Did not qualify						
(India) 2017	Did not qualify						
(Brazil) 2019	Did not qualify						
(Indonesia) 2023	Did not qualify						
(Qatar) 2025	Quarter-finals	6	4	1	1	13	6
(Qatar) 2026	Did not qualify						
(Qatar) 2027	To be determined						
(Qatar) 2028	To be determined						
(Qatar) 2029	To be determined						
Total	2/24	13	11	1	1	31	13

=== UEFA European Under-17 Championship ===
Year	Round	GP	W	D	L	GS	GA
(Denmark) 2002	Champions	6	5	1	0	12	2
(Portugal) 2003	did not qualify						
(France) 2004	did not qualify						
(Italy) 2005	Group stage	3	1	1	1	5	5
(Luxembourg) 2006	did not qualify						
(Belgium) 2007	did not qualify						
(Turkey) 2008	Group stage	3	1	0	2	1	4
(Germany) 2009	Semi-final	4	1	2	1	5	4
(Liechtenstein) 2010	Group stage	3	0	0	3	1	10
(Serbia) 2011	did not qualify						
(Slovenia) 2012	did not qualify						
(Slovakia) 2013	Group stage	3	0	1	2	3	5
(Malta) 2014	Group stage	3	0	1	2	2	5
(Bulgaria) 2015	did not qualify						
(Azerbaijan) 2016	did not qualify						
(Croatia) 2017	did not qualify						
(England) 2018	Group stage	3	2	0	1	4	2
(Republic of Ireland) 2019	did not qualify						
(Estonia) ~~2020~~	Cancelled due to COVID-19 pandemic						
(Cyprus) ~~2021~~	Cancelled due to COVID-19 pandemic						
(Israel) 2022	did not qualify						
(Hungary) 2023	Quarter-finals	4	2	2	0	5	2
(Cyprus) 2024	did not qualify						
(Albania) 2025	did not qualify						
(Estonia) 2026	did not qualify						
(Latvia) 2027	To be determined						
(Lithuania) 2028	To be determined						
(Moldova) 2029	To be determined						
Total	9/20	32	12	8	12	38	39

*Denotes draws include knockout matches decided on penalty kicks.

- Gold background color indicates first-place finish. Silver background color indicates second-place finish. Bronze background color indicates third-place finish

== Players ==
=== Current squad ===
The following players were named in the squad for the 2026 UEFA European Under-17 Championship qualification matches against Belgium, Cyprus and Serbia on 25, 28 and 31 March 2026.

No.	Pos.	Player	Date of birth (age)	Club
	GK	Lucas Kunath	10 November 2009 (age 17)	(Swiss Football Association) FC Basel
	GK	Elijah Muogbo	18 September 2009 (age 17)	(Swiss Football Association) Grasshopper Club
	GK	Nino Meier	10 March 2009 (age 17)	(Swiss Football Association) FC Luzern
	DF	Gian Vogt	22 February 2009 (age 17)	(Swiss Football Association) FC Aarau
	DF	Ifeanyichukwu Onwuzulike	12 January 2010 (age 16)	(Swiss Football Association) FC Winterthur
	DF	Moses Colelli	30 March 2009 (age 17)	(Swiss Football Association) Grasshopper Club
	DF	Sven Strassmann	19 February 2009 (age 17)	(Swiss Football Association) BSC Young Boys
	DF	Selim Tanner	3 July 2009 (age 17)	(Swiss Football Association) FC St. Gallen
	DF	Noah Kakor	8 July 2010 (age 16)	(Swiss Football Association) FC Basel
	DF	Gentian Ponik	17 September 2009 (age 17)	(Swiss Football Association) FC St. Gallen
	DF	Erblin Bajraktar	4 February 2009 (age 17)	(Swiss Football Association) BSC Young Boys
	MF	Danilo Gunjevic	1 June 2009 (age 17)	(Swiss Football Association) FC St. Gallen
	MF	Aldin Smajic	25 January 2009 (age 17)	(Swiss Football Association) FC Luzern
	MF	Boris Srejic	25 March 2009 (age 17)	(Swiss Football Association) FC Zürich
	MF	Luc Gigon	15 January 2009 (age 17)	(Swiss Football Association) Grasshopper Club
	MF	Ivan Izquierdo	3 March 2009 (age 17)	(Swiss Football Association) Servette FC
	MF	Elias Kurti	13 January 2009 (age 17)	(Swiss Football Association) Grasshopper Club
	MF	Bright Boahen Ocran	26 August 2009 (age 17)	(Swiss Football Association) BSC Young Boys
	MF	Altin Azemi	29 April 2009 (age 17)	(Swiss Football Association) Xamax
	FW	Euron Bajraktar	4 February 2009 (age 17)	(Swiss Football Association) BSC Young Boys
	FW	Shedrach Ogbodu	26 March 2009 (age 17)	(Swiss Football Association) FC Basel
	FW	João Vogt	1 September 2009 (age 17)	(Swiss Football Association) FC Zürich
	FW	Bryan Zurmühle	11 February 2009 (age 17)	(Swiss Football Association) FC Lugano

== Head-to-head record ==
The following table shows Switzerland's head-to-head record in the FIFA U-17 World Cup.

Opponent	Pld	W	D	L	GF	GA	GD	Win %
Brazil	1	1	0	0	1	0	+1	100.00
Colombia	1	1	0	0	4	0	+4	100.00
Egypt	1	1	0	0	3	1	+2	100.00
Germany	1	1	0	0	4	3	+1	100.00
Italy	1	1	0	0	2	1	+1	100.00
Ivory Coast	1	1	0	0	4	1	+3	100.00
Japan	1	1	0	0	4	3	+1	100.00
Mexico	2	2	0	0	5	1	+4	100.00
Nigeria	1	1	0	0	1	0	+1	100.00
Portugal	1	0	0	1	0	2	−2	0.00
Republic of Ireland	1	1	0	0	3	1	+2	100.00
South Korea	1	0	1	0	0	0	+0	0.00
Total	13	11	1	1	31	13	+18	84.62

== See also ==
- European Under-17 Football Championship
- Under-17 World Cup
