= Aigbe Oliha =

Nigerian footballer

Personal information
- Date of birth: 11 February 1993 (age 33)

Team information
- Current team: ES Zarzis

Youth career
- 2009: Igbino Babes

Senior career*
Years	Team	Apps	(Gls)
2011–	ES Zarzis	9	(0)

International career
2009	Nigeria U17	7	(0)
2012–	Nigeria U20	7	(0)
- * Club domestic league appearances and goals as of 22 November 2013

Aigbe Oliha (born 11 February 1993) is a Nigerian football player who plays for ES Zarzis in the Tunisian Professional league.

== International career ==
Oliha represented Nigeria at the Under 17 World Cup in 2009. He played in 7 games and Nigeria reached the final where they lost 1–0 to Switzerland. He was also called by Nigeria for the 2013 African U-20 Championship.
