= Dany Ryser =

Swiss football manager (born 1957)

Personal information
- Date of birth: 25 April 1957 (age 69)
- Place of birth: Solothurn, Switzerland

Team information
- Current team: Switzerland U17 (manager)

Managerial career
- Years: Team
- 1990–1996: Biel-Bienne
- 2003–2004: Switzerland U20
- 2009: Switzerland U17
- 2010: Switzerland U15
- 2011–: Switzerland U17
Medal record
Men's football
Representing Switzerland (as manager)
FIFA U-17 World Cup
Winner	2009

Dany Ryser (born 25 April 1957) is a Swiss football manager. He is currently in charge of the Switzerland national under-17 football team. In 2009, he led the under-17 side in winning the 2009 FIFA U-17 World Cup. The following year he won the award for Swiss football coach of the year.

Ryser has since 1 November 1986 been a UEFA Pro-License coach. Since 1997 he has worked for Swiss Football Association. He previously coached FC Biel-Bienne and several Switzerland national football teams at various age-levels.

== Honours ==
Switzerland

- FIFA U-17 World Cup winner: 2009
