= 2009 FIFA U-17 World Cup =

FIFA U-17 World Cup Nigeria 2009

Tournament details
- Host country: Nigeria
- Dates: 24 October – 15 November
- Teams: 24 (from 6 confederations)
- Venues: 8 (in 8 host cities)

Final positions
- Champions: Switzerland (1st title)
- Runners-up: Nigeria
- Third place: Spain
- Fourth place: Colombia

Tournament statistics
- Matches played: 52
- Goals scored: 151 (2.9 per match)
- Attendance: 778,787 (14,977 per match)
- Top scorer(s): (Spain) Borja Bastón (Nigeria) Sani Emmanuel (Uruguay) Sebastián Gallegos (Switzerland) Haris Seferovic (5 goals each)
- Best player: (Nigeria) Sani Emmanuel
- Best goalkeeper: (Switzerland) Benjamin Siegrist
- Fair play award: Nigeria

The 2009 FIFA U-17 World Cup was the thirteenth tournament of the FIFA U-17 World Cup held in Nigeria from 24 October to 15 November 2009.

Switzerland won the tournament, beating the host team and holders, Nigeria, with a solitary 63rd-minute goal separating the two teams. The Golden Ball to the Best Player was given to Nigerian Sani Emmanuel; the Golden Shoe for top scorer was given to Spaniard Borja, with five goals (although he tied with Nigerian Sani Emmanuel, Uruguayan Sebastián Gallegos, and Swiss Haris Seferovic); the Golden Glove was given to Swiss Benjamin Siegrist; finally, the FIFA Fair Play Award was given to Nigeria.

== Player eligibility ==
To be eligible to play, a player must have been born on or after 1 January 1992.

== Venues ==
FIFA chose eight venues out of nine possible locations.

On 21 May 2009, FIFA gave Nigeria a "Yellow Card" as FIFA noted a significant delay in the preparations for the tournament. While Abuja and Lagos were ready, FIFA vice-president Jack Warner gave four other venues (Enugu, Calabar, Ijebu-Ode and Kano) a month to get 100 percent ready or the tournament would be moved. One potential venue (Warri) was removed after recent violence flared up in the Niger Delta.

Abuja	Lagos	Enugu	Ijebu-Ode
National Stadium	Teslim Balogun Stadium	Nnamdi Azikiwe Stadium	Gateway Stadium
Capacity: 60,491	Capacity: 24,325	Capacity: 22,000	Capacity: 20,000
2009 FIFA U-17 World Cup (Nigeria)
Kano	Calabar	Kaduna	Bauchi
Sani Abacha Stadium	U.J. Esuene Stadium	Ahmadu Bello Stadium	Abubarkar Tafawa Balewa Stadium
Capacity: 18,000	Capacity: 16,000	Capacity: 16,500	Capacity: 11,000

== Threats to the tournament ==
The 2009 edition was under increasing threats from the armed rebel group The Movement for the Emancipation of the Niger Delta (MEND) and warned FIFA against hosting the tournament in Nigeria. However, the militants were offered amnesty in exchange for laying down their weapons, and the tournament went on smoothly without any incidents.

== Teams ==
The final draw for the group stage was held on 7 August 2009 at the International Conference Centre in Abuja.

Confederation	Qualifying tournament	Qualifier(s)
AFC (Asia)	2008 AFC U-16 Championship	Iran; South Korea; Japan; United Arab Emirates
CAF (Africa)	Host nation	Nigeria
CAF (Africa)	2009 African Under-17 Championship	Algeria^{1} Gambia; Malawi^{1} Burkina Faso
CONCACAF (Central, North America and Caribbean)	2009 CONCACAF U-17 Championship	Mexico; United States; Costa Rica; Honduras
CONMEBOL (South America)	2009 South American Under-17 Football Championship	Brazil; Argentina; Uruguay; Colombia
OFC (Oceania)	2009 OFC U-17 Championship	New Zealand
UEFA (Europe)	2009 UEFA European Under-17 Championship	Germany; Netherlands; Switzerland^{1} Italy; Spain; Turkey

1.Teams that made their debut.

== Match officials ==
Confederation	Referee	Assistants
AFC	Ravshan Irmatov (Uzbekistan)	Rafael Ilyasov (Uzbekistan); Bakhadyr Kochkarov (Kyrgyzstan)
CAF	Mohamed Benouza (Algeria)	Mamar Chabane (Algeria); Nasser Abdel Nabi (Egypt)
CAF	Koman Coulibaly (Mali)	Inácio Cândido (Angola); Redouane Achik (Morocco)
CAF	Jerome Damon (South Africa)	Enock Molefe (South Africa); Kenneth Chichenga (Zambia)
CAF	Eddy Maillet (Seychelles)	Jason Damoo (Seychelles); Evarist Menkouande (Cameroon)
CONCACAF	Carlos Batres (Guatemala)	Carlos Pastrana (Honduras); Leonel Leal (Costa Rica)
CONCACAF	Jair Marrufo (United States)	Charles Morgante (United States); Ricardo Morgan (Jamaica)
CONMEBOL	Pablo Pozo (Chile)	Patricio Basualto (Chile); Francisco Mondria (Chile)
CONMEBOL	Carlos Amarilla (Paraguay)	Emigdio Ruiz (Paraguay); Nicolas Yegros (Paraguay)
CONMEBOL	Martín Vázquez (Uruguay)	Miguel Nievas (Uruguay); Carlos Pastorino (Uruguay)
OFC	Michael Hester (New Zealand)	Jan-Hendrik Hintz (New Zealand); Tevita Makasini (Tonga)
UEFA	Howard Webb (England)	Michael Mullarkey (England); Darren Cann (England)
UEFA	Stéphane Lannoy (France)	Eric Dansault (France); Laurent Ugo (France)
UEFA	Wolfgang Stark (Germany)	Jan-Hendrik Salver (Germany); Volker Wezel (Germany)
UEFA	Viktor Kassai (Hungary)	Gábor Erős (Hungary); Tibor Vámos (Hungary)
UEFA	Tom Henning Øvrebø (Norway)	Geir Åge Holen (Norway); Dag Roger Nebben (Norway)
UEFA	Massimo Busacca (Switzerland)	Manuel Navarro (Switzerland); Matthias Arnet (Switzerland)

== Allocation of teams to groups ==
Teams were allocated to groups on the basis of geographical spread. Teams were placed in four pots, and one team was drawn from each pot for each group. Pot 1 contained the five African teams plus one from CONMEBOL; Pot 2 contained the remaining teams from the Americas excluding one CONCACAF team; Pot 3 consisted of teams from Asia and Oceania plus the remaining CONCACAF team; Pot 4 consisted of teams from the European confederation.

Pot 1	Pot 2	Pot 3	Pot 4
Nigeria; Algeria; Burkina Faso; Gambia; Malawi; Brazil	Argentina; Colombia; Uruguay; Costa Rica; Mexico; United States	Iran; Japan; South Korea; United Arab Emirates; Honduras; New Zealand	Germany; Italy; Netherlands; Spain; Switzerland; Turkey

== Group stage ==
All times are West Africa Time (UTC+1)

=== Group A ===
Pos	Team	Pld	W	D	L	GF	GA	GD	Pts	Group stage result
1	Nigeria (H)	3	2	1	0	6	4	+2	7	Advanced to knockout stage
2	Argentina	3	2	0	1	4	3	+1	6	Advanced to knockout stage
3	Germany	3	1	1	1	7	6	+1	4	Advanced to knockout stage
4	Honduras	3	0	0	3	1	5	−4	0	

(H) Hosts
24 October 2009
19:30

Nigeria	3–3	Germany
S. Okoro 54' (pen.); Omeruo 59'; Egbedi 61'	Report	Thy 21'; Mustafi 39'; Götze 47'

National Stadium, Abuja
Attendance: 21,300
Referee: Ravshan Irmatov (Uzbekistan)
24 October 2009
16:00

Honduras	0–1	Argentina
	Report	Araujo 59'

National Stadium, Abuja
Attendance: 19,560
Referee: Massimo Busacca (Switzerland)

27 October 2009
16:00

Argentina	2–1	Germany
Espíndola 57' (pen.); Araujo 59'	Report	Götze 8'

National Stadium, Abuja
Attendance: 14,400
Referee: Koman Coulibaly (Mali)
27 October 2009
19:00

Nigeria	1–0	Honduras
Ajagun 55'	Report

National Stadium, Abuja
Attendance: 42,900
Referee: Stéphane Lannoy (France)

30 October 2009
16:00

Germany	3–1	Honduras
Thy 55', 56'; Volland 73'	Report	Lozano 46'

National Stadium, Abuja
Attendance: 3,090
Referee: Carlos Amarilla (Paraguay)
30 October 2009
16:00

Argentina	1–2	Nigeria
Orfano 2'	Report	Ojabu 5'; Emmanuel 72' (pen.)

Abubarkar Tafawa Balewa Stadium, Bauchi
Attendance: 11,467
Referee: Jair Marrufo (United States)

=== Group B ===
Pos	Team	Pld	W	D	L	GF	GA	GD	Pts	Group stage result
1	Switzerland	3	3	0	0	7	3	+4	9	Advanced to knockout stage
2	Mexico	3	2	0	1	3	2	+1	6	Advanced to knockout stage
3	Brazil	3	1	0	2	3	4	−1	3	
4	Japan	3	0	0	3	5	9	−4	0	

24 October 2009
19:00

Brazil	3–2	Japan
Guilherme 26'; Neymar 67'; Wellington Nem 90+4'	Report	Takagi 35'; Sugimoto 84'

Teslim Balogun Stadium, Lagos
Attendance: 15,254
Referee: Howard Webb (England)
24 October 2009
16:00

Mexico	0–2	Switzerland
	Report	Kasami 22'; Rodríguez 42' (o.g.)

Teslim Balogun Stadium, Lagos
Attendance: 9,870
Referee: Michael Hester (New Zealand)

27 October 2009
16:00

Switzerland	4–3	Japan
Seferovic 43', 51'; Xhaka 53'; Rodriguez 74'	Report	Miyayoshi 9', 20'; Kojima 90+3'

Teslim Balogun Stadium, Lagos
Attendance: 9,920
Referee: Carlos Batres (Guatemala)
27 October 2009
19:00

Brazil	0–1	Mexico
	Report	Basulto 70'

Teslim Balogun Stadium, Lagos
Attendance: 21,115
Referee: Tom Henning Øvrebø (Norway)

30 October 2009
19:00

Japan	0–2	Mexico
	Report	Campos 65'; Parra 79'

Teslim Balogun Stadium, Lagos
Attendance: 17,105
Referee: Stéphane Lannoy (France)
30 October 2009
19:00

Switzerland	1–0	Brazil
Ben Khalifa 21'	Report

National Stadium, Abuja
Attendance: 4,250
Referee: Eddy Maillet (Seychelles)

=== Group C ===
Pos	Team	Pld	W	D	L	GF	GA	GD	Pts	Group stage result
1	Iran	3	2	1	0	3	0	+3	7	Advanced to knockout stage
2	Colombia	3	1	2	0	4	3	+1	5	Advanced to knockout stage
3	Netherlands	3	1	0	2	3	4	−1	3	
4	Gambia	3	0	1	2	3	6	−3	1	

25 October 2009
16:00

Iran	2–0	Gambia
Sadeghian 44'; Rezaei 84'	Report

U.J. Esuene Stadium, Calabar
Attendance: 9,200
Referee: Pablo Pozo (Chile)

25 October 2009
19:00

Colombia	2–1	Netherlands
Castillo 56'; Córdoba 72'	Report	Özyakup 69' (pen.)

U.J. Esuene Stadium, Calabar
Attendance: 10,100
Referee: Jerome Damon (South Africa)

28 October 2009
16:00

Netherlands	2–1	Gambia
Castaignos 19'; Boere 70'	Report	E. Bojang 26' (pen.)

U.J. Esuene Stadium, Calabar
Attendance: 6,800
Referee: Ravshan Irmatov (Uzbekistan)

28 October 2009
19:00

Iran	0–0	Colombia
	Report

U.J. Esuene Stadium, Calabar
Attendance: 8,600
Referee: Michael Hester (New Zealand)

31 October 2009
16:00

Gambia	2–2	Colombia
L. S. Samateh 19'; E. Bojang 42'	Report	Cuéllar 78', 89' (pen.)

U.J. Esuene Stadium, Calabar
Attendance: 6,100
Referee: Howard Webb (England)

31 October 2009
16:00

Netherlands	0–1	Iran
	Report	Gharibi 25'

Nnamdi Azikiwe Stadium, Enugu
Attendance: 7,461
Referee: Carlos Batres (Guatemala)

=== Group D ===
Pos	Team	Pld	W	D	L	GF	GA	GD	Pts	Group stage result
1	Turkey	3	2	1	0	6	2	+4	7	Advanced to knockout stage
2	Burkina Faso	3	1	1	1	5	3	+2	4	Advanced to knockout stage
3	New Zealand	3	0	3	0	3	3	0	3	Advanced to knockout stage
4	Costa Rica	3	0	1	2	3	9	−6	1	

25 October 2009
16:00

Turkey	1–0	Burkina Faso
Demir 3'	Report

Nnamdi Azikiwe Stadium, Enugu
Attendance: 12,350
Referee: Carlos Amarilla (Paraguay)

25 October 2009
19:00

Costa Rica	1–1	New Zealand
Campbell 35'	Report	Built 19'

Nnamdi Azikiwe Stadium, Enugu
Attendance: 16,850
Referee: Eddy Maillet (Seychelles)

28 October 2009
16:00

New Zealand	1–1	Burkina Faso
Murie 57'	Report	V. Nikiema 12'

Nnamdi Azikiwe Stadium, Enugu
Attendance: 10,195
Referee: Howard Webb (England)

29 October 2009
15:00

Turkey	4–1	Costa Rica
Şahiner 3'; Demir 33'; Bekdemir 42'; Iravul 70'	Report	Moya 44'

Nnamdi Azikiwe Stadium, Enugu
Attendance: 5,632
Referee: Jerome Damon (South Africa)

31 October 2009
19:00

Burkina Faso	4–1	Costa Rica
Zidane 12'; Ibrango 38'; Ouédraogo 82'; B. Traoré 90'	Report	Golobio 86'

Nnamdi Azikiwe Stadium, Enugu
Attendance: 11,483
Referee: Ravshan Irmatov (Uzbekistan)

31 October 2009
19:00

New Zealand	1–1	Turkey
Hobson-McVeigh 90+1'	Report	Bekdemir 17'

U.J. Esuene Stadium, Calabar
Attendance: 7,000
Referee: Martín Vázquez (Uruguay)

=== Group E ===
Pos	Team	Pld	W	D	L	GF	GA	GD	Pts	Group stage result
1	Spain	3	3	0	0	9	3	+6	9	Advanced to knockout stage
2	United States	3	2	0	1	3	2	+1	6	Advanced to knockout stage
3	United Arab Emirates	3	1	0	2	3	4	−1	3	Advanced to knockout stage
4	Malawi	3	0	0	3	1	7	−6	0	

26 October 2009
16:00

United Arab Emirates	2–0	Malawi
Al-Saffar 63'; Sebil 81'	Report

Sani Abacha Stadium, Kano
Attendance: 8,500
Referee: Martín Vázquez (Uruguay)

26 October 2009
19:00

Spain	2–1	United States
Borja 22'; Sarabia 30'	Report	McInerney 4'

Sani Abacha Stadium, Kano
Attendance: 19,500
Referee: Viktor Kassai (Hungary)

29 October 2009
16:00

United States	1–0	Malawi
Shinsky 54'	Report

Sani Abacha Stadium, Kano
Attendance: 9,000
Referee: Massimo Busacca (Switzerland)

29 October 2009
19:00

United Arab Emirates	1–3	Spain
Sebil 68'	Report	Isco 12'; Borja 19'; Carmona 88'

Sani Abacha Stadium, Kano
Attendance: 20,000
Referee: Wolfgang Stark (Germany)

1 November 2009
16:00

Malawi	1–4	Spain
Milanzi 82'	Report	Carmona 32'; Morata 60', 74'; Espinosa 62'

Sani Abacha Stadium, Kano
Attendance: 7,000
Referee: Pablo Pozo (Chile)

1 November 2009
16:00

United States	1–0	United Arab Emirates
McInerney 35'	Report

Gateway Stadium, Ijebu-Ode
Attendance: 13,780
Referee: Koman Coulibaly (Mali)

=== Group F ===
Pos	Team	Pld	W	D	L	GF	GA	GD	Pts	Group stage result
1	Italy	3	2	1	0	3	1	+2	7	Advanced to knockout stage
2	South Korea	3	2	0	1	6	3	+3	6	Advanced to knockout stage
3	Uruguay	3	1	1	1	3	3	0	4	Advanced to knockout stage
4	Algeria	3	0	0	3	0	5	−5	0	

26 October 2009
16:00

Uruguay	1–3	South Korea
Gallegos 60' (pen.)	Report	Nam Seung-woo 13'; Son Heung-min 62'; Lee Jong-ho 90'

Ahmadu Bello Stadium, Kaduna
Attendance: 13,700
Referee: Wolfgang Stark (Germany)

26 October 2009
19:00

Algeria	0–1	Italy
	Report	Carraro 78'

Ahmadu Bello Stadium, Kaduna
Attendance: 18,418
Referee: Jair Marrufo (United States)

29 October 2009
16:00

Italy	2–1	South Korea
Camporese 56'; Iemmello 61'	Report	Kim Jin-su 30' (pen.)

Ahmadu Bello Stadium, Kaduna
Attendance: 11,400
Referee: Pablo Pozo (Chile)

29 October 2009
19:00

Uruguay	2–0	Algeria
Luna 47'; Gallegos 70'	Report

Ahmadu Bello Stadium, Kaduna
Attendance: 13,879
Referee: Viktor Kassai (Hungary)

1 November 2009
19:00

South Korea	2–0	Algeria
Lee Jong-ho 12'; Son Heung-min 22'	Report

Ahmadu Bello Stadium, Kaduna
Attendance: 14,755
Referee: Michael Hester (New Zealand)

1 November 2009
19:00

Italy	0–0	Uruguay
	Report

Sani Abacha Stadium, Kano
Attendance: 20,000
Referee: Tom Henning Øvrebø (Norway)

=== Ranking of third-placed teams ===
Pos	Grp	Team	Pld	W	D	L	GF	GA	GD	Pts	Group stage result
1	A	Germany	3	1	1	1	7	6	+1	4 (Note: −7 fair play points)	Advanced to knockout stage
2	F	Uruguay	3	1	1	1	3	3	0	4 (Note: −3 fair play points)	Advanced to knockout stage
3	D	New Zealand	3	0	3	0	3	3	0	3	Advanced to knockout stage
4	E	United Arab Emirates	3	1	0	2	3	4	−1	3 (Note: −5 fair play points)	Advanced to knockout stage
5	B	Brazil	3	1	0	2	3	4	−1	3 (Note: −6 fair play points)	
6	C	Netherlands	3	1	0	2	3	4	−1	3	

Rules for classification: The 4 best 3rd place teams qualify for the knockout stage. The first determining factor is points, the second is goal difference, and the third is the number of goals scored. If teams are still level, then Fair-Play ranking is used as the fourth criterion. This ranking is as follows: −1 for yellow card, −3 for a red card (straight or 2 yellows in the same game), −4 in case of a yellow card followed by a straight red card in the same game. If the teams are still level at this point, a drawing of lots determine the qualified team(s).

== Knockout stage ==
All times are West Africa Time (UTC+1)

Round of 16
4 November 2009 — Ijebu-Ode
Argentina	2
Colombia	3
4 November 2009 — Enugu
Turkey	2
United Arab Emirates	0
4 November 2009 — Lagos
Switzerland (aet)	4
Germany	3
4 November 2009 — Kaduna
Italy	2
United States	1
5 November 2009 — Kano
Spain	4
Burkina Faso	1
5 November 2009 — Calabar
Iran	1
Uruguay (aet)	2
5 November 2009 — Bauchi
Mexico	1 (3)
South Korea (pen.)	1 (5)
5 November 2009 — Abuja
Nigeria	5
New Zealand	0

Quarter-finals
8 November 2009 — Bauchi
Colombia (pen.)	1 (5)
Turkey	1 (3)
8 November 2009 — Ijebu-Ode
Switzerland	2
Italy	1
9 November 2009 — Kaduna
Spain (pen.)	3 (4)
Uruguay	3 (2)
9 November 2009 — Calabar
South Korea	1
Nigeria	3

Semi-finals
12 November 2009 — Lagos
Colombia	0
Switzerland	4
12 November 2009 — Lagos
Spain	1
Nigeria	3

Final
15 November 2009 — Abuja
Switzerland	1
Nigeria	0
Third place
15 November 2009 — Abuja
Colombia	0
Spain	1

=== Round of 16 ===
4 November 2009
16:00

Argentina	2–3	Colombia
González Pírez 17'; Araujo 57'	Report	Murillo 63'; Blanco 88'; Quiñones 90+1'

Gateway Stadium, Ijebu-Ode
Attendance: 12,460
Referee: Wolfgang Stark (Germany)

4 November 2009
19:00

Turkey	2–0	United Arab Emirates
Şeker 2'; Özbek 90+2'	Report

Nnamdi Azikiwe Stadium, Enugu
Attendance: 16,782
Referee: Eddy Maillet (Seychelles)

4 November 2009
19:00

Switzerland	4–3 (a.e.t.)	Germany
Rodriguez 35'; Seferovic 49'; Gonçalves 101'; Ben Khalifa 116' (pen.)	Report	Götze 39'; Trinks 78'; Mallı 118'

Teslim Balogun Stadium, Lagos
Attendance: 15,515
Referee: Martín Vázquez (Uruguay)

4 November 2009
16:00

Italy	2–1	United States
Beretta 29'; Iemmello 56'	Report	Palodichuk 51'

Ahmadu Bello Stadium, Kaduna
Attendance: 11,301
Referee: Carlos Amarilla (Paraguay)

5 November 2009
16:00

Spain	4–1	Burkina Faso
Roberto 19', 56', 67'; Carmona 83' (pen.)	Report	Ibrango 26'

Sani Abacha Stadium, Kano
Attendance: 14,000
Referee: Michael Hester (New Zealand)

5 November 2009
19:00

Iran	1–2 (a.e.t.)	Uruguay
Esmaeilzadeh 119'	Report	Gallegos 104', 117'

U.J. Esuene Stadium, Calabar
Attendance: 3,600
Referee: Stéphane Lannoy (France)

5 November 2009
16:00

Mexico	1–1 (a.e.t.)	South Korea
Madrigal 44'	Report	Kim Dong-jin 90+2'
Penalties
Campos (penalty missed); Basulto (penalty scored); García (penalty scored); Vera (penalty scored)	3–5	(penalty scored) Lee Kang; (penalty scored) Ahn Jin-beom; (penalty scored) Kim Jin-su; (penalty scored) Lee Jong-ho; (penalty scored) Lee Min-soo

Abubarkar Tafawa Balewa Stadium, Bauchi
Attendance: 11,589
Referee: Jerome Damon (South Africa)

5 November 2009
19:00

Nigeria	5–0	New Zealand
Egbedi 14', 28'; S. Okoro 24'; Emmanuel 75', 79'	Report

National Stadium, Abuja
Attendance: 35,200
Referee: Massimo Busacca (Switzerland)

=== Quarter-finals ===
8 November 2009
16:00

Colombia	1–1 (a.e.t.)	Turkey
Ramos 90'	Report	Demir 20'
Penalties
Arias (penalty scored); Murillo (penalty scored); Ramos (penalty scored); Cataño (penalty scored); Cuéllar (penalty scored)	5–3	(penalty scored) Gülle; (penalty missed) Şeker; (penalty scored) Iravul; (penalty scored) Alkan

Abubarkar Tafawa Balewa Stadium, Bauchi
Attendance: 11,532
Referee: Koman Coulibaly (Mali)

8 November 2009
19:00

Switzerland	2–1	Italy
Ben Khalifa 24'; Buff 62'	Report	Carraro 32'

Gateway Stadium, Ijebu-Ode
Attendance: 13,482
Referee: Viktor Kassai (Hungary)

9 November 2009
16:00

Spain	3–3 (a.e.t.)	Uruguay
Isco 17' (pen.); Borja 49', 50'	Report	Luna 10'; Mezquida 71'; Gallegos 84'
Penalties
S. Gómez (penalty scored); Borja (penalty scored); Aurtenetxe (penalty scored); Sarabia (penalty missed); Isco (penalty scored)	4–2	(penalty scored) Gallegos; (penalty scored) Barreto; (penalty missed) Laureiro; (penalty missed) Mezquida

Ahmadu Bello Stadium, Kaduna
Attendance: 10,281
Referee: Carlos Batres (Guatemala)

9 November 2009
19:00

South Korea	1–3	Nigeria
Son Heung-Min 40'	Report	Azeez 23'; Ajagun 50'; Envoh 85'

U.J. Esuene Stadium, Calabar
Attendance: 9,100
Referee: Howard Webb (England)

=== Semi-finals ===
12 November 2009
16:00

Colombia	0–4	Switzerland
	Report	Ben Khalifa 14' (pen.); Seferovic 36'; Martignoni 50'; Rodriguez 68'

Teslim Balogun Stadium, Lagos
Attendance: 18,011
Referee: Michael Hester (New Zealand)

12 November 2009
19:00

Spain	1–3	Nigeria
Borja 83'	Report	S. Okoro 30'; Emmanuel 61', 71'

Teslim Balogun Stadium, Lagos
Attendance: 24,000
Referee: Ravshan Irmatov (Uzbekistan)

=== Third place match ===
15 November 2009
16:00

Colombia	0–1	Spain
	Report	Isco 75'

National Stadium, Abuja
Attendance: 40,000
Referee: Koman Coulibaly (Mali)

=== Final ===
15 November 2009
19:00

Switzerland	1–0	Nigeria
Seferovic 63'	Report

National Stadium, Abuja
Attendance: 60,000
Referee: Martín Vázquez (Uruguay)

== Awards ==
Golden Ball	Silver Ball	Bronze Ball
(Nigeria) Sani Emmanuel	(Switzerland) Nassim Ben Khalifa	(Nigeria) Ramón Azeez
Golden Shoe	Silver Shoe	Bronze Shoe
(Spain) Borja	(Nigeria) Sani Emmanuel	(Uruguay) Sebastián Gallegos
5 goals	5 goals	5 goals
Golden Glove
(Switzerland) Benjamin Siegrist
FIFA Fair Play Award
Nigeria

== Goalscorers ==
5 goals

- (Nigeria) Sani Emmanuel
- (Spain) Borja
- (Switzerland) Haris Seferovic
- (Uruguay) Sebastián Gallegos

4 goals

- (Switzerland) Nassim Ben Khalifa

3 goals

- (Argentina) Sergio Araujo
- (Germany) Mario Götze
- (Germany) Lennart Thy
- (South Korea) Son Heung-min
- (Nigeria) Edafe Egbedi
- (Nigeria) Stanley Okoro
- (Spain) Adrià Carmona
- (Spain) Isco
- (Spain) Sergi Roberto
- (Switzerland) Ricardo Rodriguez
- (Turkey) Muhammet Demir

2 goals

- (Burkina Faso) Abdoulaye Ibrango
- (Colombia) Gustavo Cuéllar
- (The Gambia) Ebrima Bojang
- (Italy) Federico Carraro
- (Italy) Pietro Iemmello
- (Japan) Takumi Miyayoshi
- (South Korea) Lee Jong-ho
- (Nigeria) Abdul Jeleel Ajagun
- (Spain) Álvaro Morata
- (Turkey) Engin Bekdemir
- (United Arab Emirates) Mohammed Sebil
- (United States) Jack McInerney
- (Uruguay) Adrián Luna

1 goal

- (Argentina) Esteban Espíndola
- (Argentina) Leandro González Pírez
- (Argentina) Esteban Orfano
- (Brazil) Guilherme
- (Brazil) Neymar
- (Brazil) Wellington Nem
- (Burkina Faso) Victor Nikiema
- (Burkina Faso) Louckmane Ouédraogo
- (Burkina Faso) Bertrand Traoré
- (Burkina Faso) Zidane Zoungrana
- (Colombia) Jean Carlos Blanco
- (Colombia) Fabián Castillo
- (Colombia) Deiner Córdoba
- (Colombia) Jeison Murillo
- (Colombia) Héctor Quiñones
- (Colombia) Jorge Luis Ramos
- (Costa Rica) Joel Campbell
- (Costa Rica) Juan Bustos Golobio
- (Costa Rica) Jonathan Moya
- (The Gambia) Lamin Sarjo Samateh
- (Germany) Yunus Mallı
- (Germany) Shkodran Mustafi
- (Germany) Florian Trinks
- (Germany) Kevin Volland
- (Honduras) Anthony Lozano
- (Iran) Afshin Esmaeilzadeh
- (Iran) Milad Gharibi
- (Iran) Kaveh Rezaei
- (Iran) Payam Sadeghian
- (Italy) Giacomo Beretta
- (Italy) Michele Camporese
- (Japan) Shuto Kojima
- (Japan) Kenyu Sugimoto
- (Japan) Yoshiaki Takagi
- (South Korea) Kim Dong-jin
- (South Korea) Kim Jin-su
- (South Korea) Nam Seung-woo
- (Malawi) Luke Milanzi
- (Mexico) Miguel Basulto
- (Mexico) Carlos Campos
- (Mexico) Guillermo Madrigal
- (Mexico) Carlos Parra
- (Netherlands) Tom Boere
- (Netherlands) Luc Castaignos
- (Netherlands) Oğuzhan Özyakup
- (New Zealand) Michael Built
- (New Zealand) Jack Hobson-McVeigh
- (New Zealand) Gordon Murie
- (Nigeria) Ramón Azeez
- (Nigeria) Terry Envoh
- (Nigeria) Omoh Ojabu
- (Nigeria) Kenneth Omeruo
- (Spain) Javier Espinosa
- (Spain) Pablo Sarabia
- (Switzerland) Oliver Buff
- (Switzerland) André Gonçalves
- (Switzerland) Pajtim Kasami
- (Switzerland) Bruno Martignoni
- (Switzerland) Granit Xhaka
- (Turkey) Gökay Iravul
- (Turkey) Ufuk Özbek
- (Turkey) Ömer Ali Şahiner
- (Turkey) Furkan Şeker
- (United Arab Emirates) Marwan Al-Saffar
- (United States) Nick Palodichuk
- (United States) Alex Shinsky
- (Uruguay) Nicolás Mezquida

1 own goal

- (Mexico) José Rodríguez (against Switzerland)

== Final ranking ==
Rank	Team	Pld	W	D	L	GF	GA	GD	Pts
1	Switzerland	7	7	0	0	18	7	+11	21
2	Nigeria	7	5	1	1	17	7	+10	16
3	Spain	7	5	1	1	18	10	+8	16
4	Colombia	7	2	3	2	8	11	–3	9
Eliminated in the quarter-finals
5	Turkey	5	3	2	0	9	3	+6	11
6	Italy	5	3	1	1	6	4	+2	10
7	Uruguay	5	2	2	1	8	7	+1	8
8	South Korea	5	2	1	2	8	7	+1	7
Eliminated in the Round of 16
9	Iran	4	2	1	1	4	2	+2	7
10	Mexico	4	2	1	1	4	3	+1	7
11	Argentina	4	2	0	2	6	6	0	6
12	United States	4	2	0	2	4	4	0	6
13	Germany	4	1	1	2	10	10	0	4
14	Burkina Faso	4	1	1	2	6	7	–1	4
15	United Arab Emirates	4	1	0	3	3	6	–3	3
16	New Zealand	4	0	3	1	3	8	–5	3
Eliminated in group stage
17	Brazil	3	1	0	2	3	4	–1	3
18	Netherlands	3	1	0	2	3	4	–1	3
19	Gambia	3	0	1	2	3	6	–3	1
20	Costa Rica	3	0	1	2	3	9	–6	1
21	Japan	3	0	0	3	5	9	–4	0
22	Honduras	3	0	0	3	1	5	–4	0
23	Algeria	3	0	0	3	0	5	–5	0
24	Malawi	3	0	0	3	1	7	–6	0

== See also ==
- FIFA U-17 World Cup
- 2009 FIFA U-20 World Cup
