= 2009 South American U-17 Championship =

2009 South American Under 17 Football Championship
2009 Sudamericano Sub-17

Tournament details
- Host country: Chile
- Dates: 17 April – 9 May
- Teams: 10 (from 1 confederation)
- Venue: 1 (in 1 host city)

Final positions
- Champions: Brazil (9th title)
- Runners-up: Argentina
- Third place: Uruguay
- Fourth place: Colombia

Tournament statistics
- Matches played: 27
- Goals scored: 71 (2.63 per match)
- Top scorer: (Colombia) Edwin Cardona (7 goals)

The 2009 South American Under-17 Football Championship (Spanish: Sudamericano Sub-17) was a football competition for U-17 national teams affiliated with CONMEBOL. It was the 13th time the tournament was held. The tournament took place in Chile from 17 April to 9 May.

== Teams ==
Argentina
Bolivia
Brazil
Chile
Colombia
Ecuador
Paraguay
Peru
Uruguay
Venezuela

== First Group Stage ==
The teams were divided into two groups of five, with the top three teams in each group classifying to the second round.

All times local (UTC-4)

Teams qualified for 2009 FIFA U-17 World Cup.
Teams qualified for Final Group.
Teams did not qualify.

=== Group A ===
Team	Pld	W	D	L	GF	GA	GD	Pts
Brazil	4	3	0	1	10	2	+8	9
Colombia	4	2	2	0	6	3	+3	8
Bolivia	4	1	1	2	3	6	-3	4
Paraguay	4	1	1	2	3	7	-4	4
Peru	4	1	0	3	4	8	-4	3

2009-04-17
19:00

Paraguay	0 – 4	Brazil
	Report	Carlão 12'; Zezinho 30'; Coutinho 45' (pen.); Felipinho 90+3'

Estadio Tierra de Campeones, Iquique
Referee: Diego Abal (Argentina)

2009-04-17
22:00

Bolivia	1 – 1	Colombia
Mendoza 74'	Report	Cardona 1'

Estadio Tierra de Campeones, Iquique
Referee: Daniel Salazar (Ecuador)

2009-04-20
19:00

Brazil	3 – 0	Peru
Gerson 37'; Coutinho 39' (pen.); Wellington 83'	Report

Estadio Tierra de Campeones, Iquique
Referee: Darío Ubriaco (Uruguay)

2009-04-20
22:00

Bolivia	1 – 0	Paraguay
Justiniano 11'	Report

Estadio Tierra de Campeones, Iquique
Referee: Giovanni Perluzzo (Venezuela)

2009-04-23
19:00

Colombia	2 – 0	Brazil
Saiz 22'; Cardona 67'	Report

Estadio Tierra de Campeones, Iquique
Referee: Diego Abal (Argentina)

2009-04-23
22:00

Paraguay	2 – 1	Peru
Domínguez 23' (pen.); Salinas 59'	Report	Zapata 70'

Estadio Tierra de Campeones, Iquique
Referee: Jorge Osorio (Chile)

2009-04-26
19:00

Paraguay	1 – 1	Colombia
Acuña 32'	Report	Cardona 89'

Estadio Tierra de Campeones, Iquique
Referee: Darío Ubriaco (Uruguay)

2009-04-26
22:00

Bolivia	1 – 2	Peru
Méndez 73'	Report	Zapata 52' (pen.); Reyes 89'

Estadio Tierra de Campeones, Iquique
Referee: Diego Abal (Argentina)

2009-04-29
19:00

Brazil	3 – 0	Bolivia
Dodô 50'; Wellington 55'; Romário 66'	Report

Estadio Tierra de Campeones, Iquique
Referee: Jorge Osorio (Chile)

2009-04-29
22:00

Colombia	2 – 1	Peru
Ramos 14' (pen.); Robles 69'	Report	Rey 71'

Estadio Tierra de Campeones, Iquique
Referee: Diego Abal (Argentina)

=== Group B ===
Team	Pld	W	D	L	GF	GA	GD	Pts
Argentina	4	3	1	0	8	2	+6	10
Uruguay	4	2	1	1	5	4	+1	7
Ecuador	4	1	2	1	4	3	+1	5
Chile	4	1	1	2	4	7	-3	4
Venezuela	4	0	1	3	1	6	-5	1

2009-04-18
19:00

Argentina	2 – 0	Venezuela
Espíndola 10' (pen.); Araujo 58'	Report

Estadio Tierra de Campeones, Iquique
Referee: Víctor Hugo Carrillo (Peru)

2009-04-18
22:00

Chile	1 – 3	Uruguay
González 83' (pen.)	Report	Barreto 35' (pen.), 55'; Gallegos 79'

Estadio Tierra de Campeones, Iquique
Referee: Francisco Peñuela (Colombia)

2009-04-21
19:00

Venezuela	0 – 2	Ecuador
	Report	Celi 62'; Tello 87'

Estadio Tierra de Campeones, Iquique
Referee: Joaquín Antequera (Bolivia)

2009-04-21
22:00

Chile	1 – 3	Argentina
González 6' (pen.)	Report	Villalba 10'; Araujo 63'; González Pírez 67'

Estadio Tierra de Campeones, Iquique
Attendance: 8,000
Referee: Evandro Rogério Roman (Brazil)

2009-04-24
19:00

Argentina	1 – 1	Ecuador
Villalba 20'	Report	De la Cruz 58' (pen.)

Estadio Tierra de Campeones, Iquique
Referee: Carlos Galeano (Paraguay)

2009-04-24
22:00

Venezuela	0 – 1	Uruguay
	Report	Laurerio 23'

Estadio Tierra de Campeones, Iquique
Referee: Víctor Hugo Carrillo (Peru)

2009-04-27
19:00

Uruguay	0 – 2	Argentina
	Report	Araujo 11'; Villalba 90+1'

Estadio Tierra de Campeones, Iquique
Referee: Francisco Peñuela (Colombia)

2009-04-27
22:00

Chile	1 – 0	Ecuador
Andia 87'	Report

Estadio Tierra de Campeones, Iquique
Attendance: 5,000
Referee: Joaquín Antequera (Bolivia)

2009-04-30
19:00

Uruguay	1 – 1	Ecuador
De los Santos 2'	Report	De la Cruz 23' (pen.)

Estadio Tierra de Campeones, Iquique
Referee: Víctor Hugo Carrillo (Peru)

2009-04-30
22:00

Chile	1 – 1	Venezuela
Dittborn 28'	Report	Centofani 45'

Estadio Tierra de Campeones, Iquique
Attendance: 7,000
Referee: Carlos Galeano (Paraguay)

== Final Group Stage ==
Team	Pld	W	D	L	GF	GA	GD	Pts
Uruguay	3	2	1	0	6	2	+4	7
Colombia	3	2	0	1	5	3	+2	6
Bolivia	3	1	1	1	6	4	+2	4
Ecuador	3	0	0	3	2	10	-8	0

2009-05-03
19:00

Bolivia	1 – 1	Uruguay
Justiniano 90+1'	Report	Barreto 78'

Estadio Tierra de Campeones, Iquique
Attendance: 2,000
Referee: Giovanni Perluzzo (Venezuela)

2009-05-03
22:00

Colombia	3 – 0	Ecuador
Cardona 1', 27', 40' (pen.)	Report

Estadio Tierra de Campeones, Iquique
Attendance: 2,000
Referee: Jorge Osorio (Chile)

2009-05-06
19:00

Colombia	0 – 2	Uruguay
	Report	Gallegos 26'; Arias 68'

Estadio Tierra de Campeones, Iquique
Referee: Carlos Galeano (Paraguay)

2009-05-06
22:00

Ecuador	1 – 4	Bolivia
Villaprado 73'	Report	Álvarez 29', 35'; Galindo 65'; Castro 74'

Estadio Tierra de Campeones, Iquique
Attendance: 3,000
Referee: Víctor Hugo Carrillo (Peru)

2009-05-09
16:45

Bolivia	1 – 2	Colombia
Álvarez 7'	Report	Cardona 31' (pen.); Burbano 41'

Estadio Tierra de Campeones, Iquique
Attendance: 4,000
Referee: Jorge Osorio (Chile)

2009-05-09
19:00

Ecuador	1 – 3	Uruguay
Caicedo 79'	Report	Barreto 35' (pen.); Luna 53', 58'

Estadio Tierra de Campeones, Iquique
Attendance: 2,000
Referee: Diego Abal (Argentina)

=== Final ===
Argentina and Brazil (directly qualified to the World Championship after finishing 1st in their respective groups) played a match to define a champion.

2009-05-09
21:15

Argentina	2–2	Brazil
González Pírez 65'; Espíndola 88' (pen.)	Report	Zezinho 4'; Coutinho 56'
Penalties
Araujo (penalty missed); Villalba (penalty missed); Rotondi (penalty scored); Orfano (penalty scored); Espíndola (penalty missed); Olid Apaza (penalty scored); Martínez (penalty scored); Marín (penalty scored); Kruspzky (penalty missed)	5 – 6	(penalty scored) João Pedro; (penalty missed) Gerson; (penalty scored) Zezinho; (penalty missed) Coutinho; (penalty missed) Dudu; (penalty scored) Fernando; (penalty scored) Carlão; (penalty scored) Maurício; (penalty scored) Wellington

Estadio Tierra de Campeones, Iquique
Attendance: 5,000
Referee: Joaquín Antequera (Bolivia)

2009 South American Under-17 Football champions

Brazil
9th title

== Goal scorers ==
7 goals

- (Colombia) Edwin Cardona

4 goals

- (Uruguay) Gonzalo Barreto

3 goals

- (Argentina) Daniel Villalba
- (Argentina) Sergio Araujo
- (Bolivia) Gilbert Álvarez
- (Brazil) Philippe Coutinho

2 goals

- (Argentina) Esteban Espíndola
- (Argentina) Leandro González Pírez
- (Bolivia) Leonel Justiniano
- (Brazil) Wellington
- (Brazil) Zezinho
- (Chile) Álex González

2 goals (cont.)

- (Ecuador) Jonathan de la Cruz
- (Peru) Renato Zapata
- (Uruguay) Adrián Luna
- (Uruguay) Sebastián Gallegos

1 goal

- (Bolivia) Alejandro Méndez
- (Bolivia) Carlos Castro
- (Bolivia) Carlos Mendoza
- (Bolivia) Samuel Galindo
- (Brazil) Carlão
- (Brazil) Dodô
- (Brazil) Felipinho
- (Brazil) Gerson
- (Brazil) Romário
- (Chile) Enzo Andia
- (Chile) Santiago Dittborn

1 goal (cont.)

- (Colombia) Carlos Robles
- (Colombia) Faider Burbano
- (Colombia) Jorge Ramos
- (Colombia) Juan Saiz
- (Ecuador) Esteban Villaprado
- (Ecuador) Kevin Tello
- (Ecuador) Luis Celi
- (Ecuador) Richard Caicedo
- (Paraguay) Fernando Acuña
- (Paraguay) Jorge Salinas
- (Paraguay) Julio Domínguez
- (Peru) Deyair Reyes
- (Peru) Johan Rey
- (Uruguay) José Laureiro
- (Uruguay) Luis de los Santos
- (Uruguay) Ramón Arias
- (Venezuela) Rafaelle Centofani

== Countries to participate in 2009 FIFA U-17 World Cup ==
Top 4 teams qualify for 2009 FIFA U-17 World Cup:

- Brazil
- Argentina
- Uruguay
- Colombia

== See also ==
- 2009 FIFA U-17 World Cup
- 2009 FIFA U-20 World Cup
- 2009 South American Youth Championship
