= Esteban Orfano =

Argentine footballer

Personal information
- Full name: Esteban Gabriel Orfano
- Date of birth: 13 January 1992 (age 34)
- Place of birth: San Justo, Argentina
- Height: 1.72 m (5 ft 8 in)
- Position: Right midfielder

Team information
- Current team: Boca Unidos

Youth career
- Boca Juniors

Senior career*
Years	Team	Apps	(Gls)
2011–2016	Boca Juniors	2	(0)
2012	→ Villarreal B (loan)	2	(0)
2013–2014	→ Douglas Haig (loan)	23	(2)
2014–2015	→ Patronato (loan)	56	(4)
2016	→ Atlético de Rafaela (loan)	11	(1)
2016–2017	Instituto	36	(6)
2017–2018	Aldosivi	18	(0)
2018–2019	Nueva Chicago	21	(3)
2019–2020	Wilstermann	32	(4)
2021–2024	Royal Pari	69	(14)
2024–2025	Ciudad Nueva		
2025–	Boca Unidos	11	(0)

International career
- Argentina U15
2009	Argentina U17	9	(1)
- * Club domestic league appearances and goals as of 17:10, 30 March 2026 (UTC)

Esteban Gabriel Orfano (born 13 January 1992) is an Argentine professional footballer who plays as a right midfielder for Boca Unidos.

== Club career ==
Orfano started his career with Boca Juniors, notably featuring for their youth team at the 2011 U-20 Copa Libertadores in Peru; netting once across six matches. He was promoted into their senior squad during the 2010–11 Primera División, making two appearances against All Boys and Lanús under manager Julio César Falcioni. In January 2012, Orfano completed a loan move to Spain's Villarreal B. His debut arrived in a 0–3 defeat to Alcorcón in February, before featuring versus Alcoyano in a campaign which culminated with relegation from the Segunda División.

July 2013 saw Orfano loaned to Douglas Haig. After scoring his first two senior goals for Douglas Haig across 2013–14 in Primera B Nacional, Orfano joined fellow second tier team Patronato in July 2014. He remained for two seasons as they secured eighth and second-place finishes, with the latter securing promotion to the Primera División. Orfano departed Patronato soon after, but stayed in the top-flight by agreeing a loan contract with Atlético de Rafaela. One goal in eleven followed. On 18 July 2016, Orfano left Boca permanently for Instituto. He participated thirty-six times and scored six in 2016–17.

Further stints in the ranks of Aldosivi, where he won promotion, and Nueva Chicago occurred between 2017 and 2018. His first goal for Nueva Chicago came on 28 September 2018 in an encounter with ex-club Atlético de Rafaela. Orfano scored a total of three times for them in 2018–19 as they reached the promotion play-offs. In July 2019, Orfano headed off to Bolivia with Wilstermann. He'd remain for a season and a half, netting goals against Real Potosí, Oriente Petrolero, Royal Pari and Aurora - all on home soil. He also featured eight times in the Copa Libertadores. He was released at the end of 2020.

== International career ==
Orfano represented Argentina at U17 level. He won four caps at the 2009 FIFA World Cup in Nigeria, scoring against the hosts on the way to leaving the competition at the round of sixteen stage. At the beginning of that year, Orfano was selected as part of their squad for the South American U-17 Championship and made five appearances. He had previous experience with the U15s.

== Career statistics ==
As of 3 January 2021.

Appearances and goals by club, season and competition
Club	Season	League			Cup		League Cup		Continental		Other		Total	
Club	Season	Division	Apps	Goals	Apps	Goals	Apps	Goals	Apps	Goals	Apps	Goals	Apps	Goals
Boca Juniors	2010–11	Argentine Primera División	2	0	0	0	—		0	0	0	0	2	0
Boca Juniors	2011–12	Argentine Primera División	0	0	0	0	—		0	0	0	0	0	0
Boca Juniors	2012–13	Argentine Primera División	0	0	0	0	—		0	0	0	0	0	0
Boca Juniors	2013–14	Argentine Primera División	0	0	0	0	—		0	0	0	0	0	0
Boca Juniors	2014	Argentine Primera División	0	0	0	0	—		0	0	0	0	0	0
Boca Juniors	2015	Argentine Primera División	0	0	0	0	—		0	0	0	0	0	0
Boca Juniors	2016	Argentine Primera División	0	0	0	0	—		0	0	0	0	0	0
Boca Juniors	Total		2	0	0	0	—		0	0	0	0	2	0
Villarreal B (loan)	2011–12	Segunda División	2	0	—		—		—		0	0	2	0
Douglas Haig (loan)	2013–14	Primera B Nacional	23	2	1	0	—		—		0	0	24	2
Patronato (loan)	2014	Primera B Nacional	17	1	0	0	—		—		0	0	17	1
Patronato (loan)	2015	Primera B Nacional	39	3	1	0	—		—		4 (Note: Appearance(s) in the Primera B Nacional play-offs)	0	44	3
Patronato (loan)	Total		56	4	1	0	—		—		4	0	61	4
Atlético de Rafaela (loan)	2016	Argentine Primera División	11	1	0	0	—		—		0	0	11	1
Instituto	2016–17	Primera B Nacional	36	6	2	0	—		—		0	0	38	6
Aldosivi	2017–18	Primera B Nacional	18	0	1	0	—		—		1	0	20	0
Nueva Chicago	2018–19	Primera B Nacional	21	3	0	0	—		—		2	1	23	4
Wilstermann	2019	Bolivian Primera División	17	2	—		—		0	0	0	0	17	2
Wilstermann	2020	Bolivian Primera División	15	2	—		—		8 (Note: Appearance(s) in the Copa Libertadores)	0	0	0	23	2
Wilstermann	Total		32	4	—		—		8	0	0	0	40	4
Career total			201	20	5	0	—		8	0	7	1	221	21

== Honours ==
Aldosivi

- Primera B Nacional: 2017–18
