= André Gonçalves =

André Gonçalves may refer to:

- André Gonçalves (explorer) of the 15th–16th centuries, assisted in discovery of Brazil
- André Gonçalves (painter) (1685–1754), religious artist
- André Gonçalves (footballer) (born 1992), Swiss footballer
- André Gonçalves (actor), Brazilian actor
