= Edafe Egbedi =

Nigerian footballer (born 1993)

Personal information
- Full name: Edafe Egbedi
- Date of birth: 5 August 1993 (age 33)
- Place of birth: Nigeria
- Height: 1.72 m (5 ft 7 1/2 in)
- Position: Right midfielder

Team information
- Current team: IFK Malmö
- Number: 7

Youth career
- 2009: Gizallo FC
- 2010–2011: Clique Sports Academy
- 2011: AGF

Senior career*
Years	Team	Apps	(Gls)
2012–2015	AGF	7	(0)
2014	→ Skive IK (loan)	7	(0)
2015–2016	Prespa Birlik	50	(13)
2017–2018	Landskrona BoIS	39	(4)
2019–2020	Norrby IF	9	(0)
2021	Österlen FF	28	(9)
2022	Ariana FC	24	(4)
2023–	IFK Malmö	1	(0)

International career
2009–2010	Nigeria U17	11	(3)
2011–2013	Nigeria U20	12	(3)
- * Club domestic league appearances and goals as of 17:28, 7 April 2023 (UTC)

Edafe Egbedi (born 5 August 1993) is a Nigerian footballer who plays for IFK Malmö. He is notably a right-footed winger.

== Career ==
At national team level, he played for Nigeria at the 2011 FIFA U-20 World Cup, scoring the decisive goal when Nigeria beat England 1-0 in the Round of 16, to reach the Quarter-final stage. He also played seven games for Nigeria at the 2009 FIFA U-17 World Cup, helping his team all the way to the Final.

On 28 August 2014 Egbedi was loaned out from AGF to Skive IK for the remaining of 2014.

Egbedi chose to terminate its contract with AGF in January 2015

He played for Landskrona BoIS in the Swedish Division 1 and Superettan between 2017 and 2018.
