= Bruno Martignoni =

Swiss footballer (born 1992)

Personal information
- Date of birth: 13 December 1992 (age 33)
- Place of birth: Gambarogno, Switzerland
- Height: 1.78 m (5 ft 10 in)
- Positions: Right back; left back

Team information
- Current team: Locarno

Youth career
- 2000–2004: US Gambarogno
- 2004–2006: ASC Gordola
- 2007–2009: Locarno
- 2010–2011: → Cagliari (loan)

Senior career*
Years	Team	Apps	(Gls)
2009–2013	Locarno	73	(0)
2013–2016	Aarau	63	(1)
2014–2015	→ Servette (loan)	17	(1)
2017–2018	Lugano	4	(0)
2017–2018	→ Chiasso (loan)	23	(0)
2018–2020	Chiasso	53	(0)
2020–2022	Bellinzona	33	(0)
2022–	Locarno	0	(0)

International career
2009–2010	Switzerland U17	9	(1)
2011	Switzerland U20	2	(0)
2013	Switzerland U21	6	(0)
- * Club domestic league appearances and goals as of 30 April 2022

Bruno Martignoni (born 13 December 1992) is a Swiss professional footballer. He plays for Locarno.

== Club career ==
Martignoni is from the Italian speaking Canton Ticino. He began his early career with local clubs US Gambarogno and ASC Gordola before moving on to FC Locarno in 2007. After a couple of years in the club's youth teams, he made a breakthrough into the first team in the latter part of 2009. Having featured sparingly, Martignoni went on loan for the 2010–2011 season to Italian club Cagliari Calcio, playing for the reserve team. Returning to Locarno at the end of the season, Martignoni has since established himself as a first-choice defender in the team.

== International career ==
Martignoni was a Switzerland youth international. In 2009, he was part of the Swiss under-17 team that won the 2009 FIFA U-17 World Cup, beating host nation Nigeria 1—0 in the final. Martignoni played in 6 of the 7 matches at the tournament and scored in the team's semi-final win against Colombia.

== Honours ==
- FIFA U-17 World Cup: 2009
