= 2011 Toulon Tournament =

Toulon Youth Festival

Tournament details
- Host country: France
- Dates: 1–10 June
- Teams: 8 (from 5 confederations)
- Venues: 7 (in 7 host cities)

Final positions
- Champions: Colombia (3rd title)
- Runners-up: France

Tournament statistics
- Matches played: 16
- Goals scored: 41 (2.56 per match)
- Top scorer: (France) Steeven Joseph-Monrose (5 goals)
- Best player: (Colombia) James Rodríguez

The 2011 Toulon Tournament was the 39th edition of the tournament and took place from June 1 to 10. Ivory Coast were the defending champions, but they failed to win a single match and were eliminated in the group stage.

Colombia won the tournament by defeating France 3-1 in a penalty shoot-out in the final, after the match had finished in a 1-1 draw. James Rodríguez won the Meilleur joueur award for the most outstanding player of the tournament.

== Participant teams ==
- Colombia
- Ivory Coast
- Italy
- Portugal
- China
- France
- Hungary
- Mexico

== Venues ==
The matches were played in these communes:

- Aubagne
- Hyères
- La Seyne
- Le Lavandou
- Nice
- Saint-Raphaël
- Toulon

== Group stage ==
All times are UTC+2.

=== Group A ===
Team	Pld	W	D	L	GF	GA	GD	Pts	Qualification
Colombia	3	1	2	0	6	3	+3	5	Advance to Semi-final
Italy	3	1	2	0	4	2	+2	5	Advance to Semi-final
Portugal	3	1	2	0	3	2	+1	5	
Ivory Coast	3	0	0	3	1	7	−6	0	

Source: Toulon Tournament
1 June 2011
16:15

Colombia	1–1	Portugal
Rodríguez 33' (pen.)	Report	Baldé 73'

Stade Mayol, Toulon
Referee: José Alfredo Peñaloza Soto (Mexico)

1 June 2011
18:30

Ivory Coast	0–2	Italy
	Report	Paloschi 4'; Gabbiadini 80'

Stade Mayol, Toulon
Referee: Stanislav Todorov (Bulgaria)

3 June 2011
17:15

Colombia	4–1	Ivory Coast
Rodríguez 7' (pen.); Cardona 13', 19'; Muriel 45'	Report	Franco 60' (o.g.)

Stade de l'Estérel, Saint-Raphaël
Referee: Sandor Ando-Szabo (Hungary)

3 June 2011
19:30

Italy	1–1	Portugal
Gabbiadini 25'	Report	Baldé 72'

Stade de l'Estérel, Saint-Raphaël
Referee: Zhang Lei (China)

5 June 2011
18:30

Colombia	1–1	Italy
Quiñones 17'	Report	Paloschi 57' (pen.)

Le Grand Stade, Le Lavandou
Referee: Jose Alfredo Peñaloza Soto (Mexico)

5 June 2011
18:30

Ivory Coast	0–1	Portugal
	Report	N. Oliveira 48'

Stade de Lattre, Aubagne
Referee: Stanislav Todorov (Bulgaria)

=== Group B ===
Team	Pld	W	D	L	GF	GA	GD	Pts	Qualification
France	3	2	1	0	9	2	+7	7	Advance to Semi-final
Mexico	3	2	0	1	5	5	0	6	Advance to Semi-final
Hungary	3	1	1	1	4	3	+1	4	
China	3	0	0	3	1	9	−8	0	

Source: Toulon Tournament
2 June 2011
16:45

China	0–3	Hungary
	Report	Katona 42'; Futács 53'; Eppel 90+1'

Stade Perruc, Hyères
Referee: Andrea De Marco (Italy)

2 June 2011
19:00

France	4–1	Mexico
Knockaert 5'; Joseph-Monrose 40'; Tafer 64'; Benezet 70'	Report	Dávila 25'

Stade Perruc, Hyères
Referee: João Carlos Santos Capela (Portugal)

4 June 2011
16:15

Hungary	0–2	Mexico
	Report	Dávila 57'; Orrantia 66'

Stade du Ray, Nice
Referee: João Carlos Santos Capela (Portugal)

4 June 2011
18:30

France	4–0	China
Joseph-Monrose 21', 39'; Benezet 64'; Jarsalé 70'	Report

Stade du Ray, Nice
Referee: Imer Machado (Colombia)

6 June 2011
18:00

China	1–2	Mexico
Pei Shuai 10'	Report	Izazola 40' (pen.); Reyes 65'

Stade Marquet, La Seyne
Referee: Imer Machado (Colombia)

6 June 2011
18:00

France	1–1	Hungary
Duplus 90+2'	Report	Futács 45'

Stade de Lattre, Aubagne
Referee: Andrea De Marco (Italy)

== Knockout stage ==
Semi-finals
8 June – Toulon
Colombia	2
Mexico	1
8 June – Toulon
France	1
Italy	0

Final
10 June – Toulon
Colombia (p)	1 (3)
France	1 (1)
Third place
10 June – Toulon
Mexico	1 (4)
Italy (p)	1 (5)

All times are UTC+2

=== Semifinals ===
8 June 2011
17:30

Colombia	2–1	Mexico
Cardona 38'; Valencia 47'	Report	Izazola 80+2'

Stade Mayol, Toulon
Referee: Stanislav Todorov (Bulgaria)

8 June 2011
20:00

France	1–0	Italy
Joseph-Monrose 62'	Report

Stade Mayol, Toulon
Referee: Sandor Ando-Szabo (Hungary)

=== Third place play-off ===
10 June 2011
18:30

Italy	1–1	Mexico
Destro 42'	Report	Guarch 32'
Penalties
Destro (penalty scored); Caldirola (penalty scored); Rossi (penalty scored); Soriano (penalty scored); Paloschi (penalty missed); D'Alessandro (penalty scored)	5–4	(penalty scored) De Buen; (penalty scored) Villalobos; (penalty missed) Rivera; (penalty scored) Reyes; (penalty scored) Pulido; (penalty missed) Valencia

Stade Mayol, Toulon
Referee: João Carlos Santos Capela (Portugal)

=== Final ===
10 June 2011
21:00

France	1–1	Colombia
Joseph-Monrose 50'	Report	Zapata 75'
Penalties
Le Tallec (penalty missed); Pogba (penalty missed); Duplus (penalty scored); Jarsalé (penalty missed)	1–3	(penalty scored) Rodríguez; (penalty scored) Murillo; (penalty missed) Franco; (penalty scored) Candelo

Stade Mayol, Toulon
Referee: Andrea De Marco (Italy)

== Goalscorers ==
5 goals

- (France) Steeven Joseph-Monrose

3 goals

- (Colombia) Edwin Cardona

2 goals

- (Colombia) James Rodríguez
- (France) Nicolas Benezet
- (Hungary) Márkó Futács
- (Italy) Manolo Gabbiadini
- (Italy) Alberto Paloschi
- (Mexico) Ulises Dávila
- (Mexico) David Izazola
- (Portugal) Amido Baldé

1 goal

- (China) Pei Shuai
- (Colombia) Duván Zapata
- (Colombia) Luis Muriel
- (Colombia) Héctor Quiñones
- (Colombia) José Adolfo Valencia
- (France) Frédéric Duplus
- (France) Fabien Jarsalé
- (France) Anthony Knockaert
- (France) Yannis Tafer
- (Hungary) Márton Eppel
- (Hungary) Máté Katona
- (Italy) Mattia Destro
- (Mexico) Taufic Guarch
- (Mexico) Carlos Orrantía
- (Mexico) Diego Reyes
- (Portugal) Nélson Oliveira

Own goal

- (Colombia) Pedro Franco (for Ivory Coast)
