= Edwin Cardona =

Colombian footballer (born 1992)

Personal information
- Full name: Edwin Andrés Cardona Bedoya
- Date of birth: 8 December 1992 (age 33)
- Place of birth: Medellín, Colombia
- Height: 1.82 m (6 ft 0 in)
- Position: Attacking midfielder

Team information
- Current team: Atlético Nacional
- Number: 10

Youth career
- 2006–2009: Atlético Nacional

Senior career*
Years	Team	Apps	(Gls)
2009–2014	Atlético Nacional	75	(19)
2012	→ Santa Fe (loan)	34	(4)
2013	→ Junior (loan)	37	(7)
2015–2019	Monterrey	80	(31)
2017–2018	→ Boca Juniors (loan)	31	(7)
2019	→ Pachuca (loan)	32	(8)
2020–2021	Tijuana	5	(0)
2020–2021	→ Boca Juniors (loan)	12	(1)
2022–2023	Racing Club	17	(0)
2023–2024	América de Cali	34	(6)
2024–	Atlético Nacional	64	(18)

International career
2009–2011	Colombia U20	16	(8)
2014–2021	Colombia	45	(6)
Medal record
Colombia
Copa América
Third place	2016 United States
Third place	2021 Brazil
- * Club domestic league appearances and goals as of 11 December 2025

Edwin Andrés Cardona Bedoya (Spanish pronunciation: [ˈeðwiŋ kaɾˈðona]; born 8 December 1992) is a Colombian professional footballer who plays as an attacking midfielder for Categoría Primera A club Atlético Nacional.

== Club career ==
=== Colombia ===
Cardona made his professional debut in 2009 with Atlético Nacional aged 17. On 19 July 2009, he scored his first goal for the club in a 2–2 draw against América de Cali. His performances led him to getting called up for the Colombian under-20 team.

He won an Apertura with Nacional in 2011 before being loaned to fellow Colombian side Santa Fe. During his brief spell with Santa Fe, Cardona won the 2012 Apertura. The following year, Cardona would join Atlético Junior on a year-long loan.

In 2014, he was brought back to Atlético Nacional, converting himself to a key player in his first two seasons. During his most prominent time at the club, Cardona went on to dispute the final of the 2014 Copa Sudamericana. Despite losing the final against Argentine club River Plate, he was amongst the best players of the tournament, even earning the best young player award. That same year, Cardona was included in Star XI of the Americas.

=== Monterrey ===
On 16 December 2014, Cardona signed for Liga MX club Monterrey alongside compatriots Alexander Mejía and Yimmi Chará. On 18 January 2015, Cardona scored his first goal for Los Rayados, netting against Pachuca for the 2014 Clausura. On 22 February 2015, Cardona scored within 20 seconds of being subbed on to give his club the victory against Querétaro. His first brace would come on 7 March against Toluca.

Cardona scored his second brace on 16 August against Dorados de Sinaloa for the 2015 Apertura. During a match for the 2016 Clausura against Santos Laguna, Cardona was praised for scoring an impressive bicycle kick. Due to this, he was given the nickname "Crackdona" amongst Monterrey fans. The match ended in a 2–1 victory with the first goal for Monterrey being scored by fellow countryman Dorlan Pabón.

On match-day 14, Cardona scored a goal against Club Tijuana by chipping it past Argentine keeper Federico Vilar. Monterrey ended up winning the match thus helping maintain their spot as leaders. The following 8 April, Cardona netted another brace against Jaguares de Chiapas which earned him the man of the match award.

=== Loan to Boca Juniors ===
On 18 July 2017, the Colombian international joined Argentine giants Boca Juniors on a year-long loan plus a possible six months added if the club advances to the round of 16 at the 2018 Copa Libertadores. Monterrey set a $6 million price tag for Cardona if he were to be signed permanently by Boca Juniors.

On 14 August, Cardona made his official debut against Gimnasia y Tiro for the Copa Argentina where he provided an assist and scored a goal in a 5–0 victory. He made his Superclásico debut on 5 November, scoring a free-kick goal in an eventual 1–2 away win for the Xeneizes.

=== Pachuca and Tijuana ===
In December 2018, Cardona was signed by Pachuca for the 2019 season. On 3 March 2019, he scored twice and provided an assist in a 4–0 victory against Club Tijuana. On 13 April, in a historic 9–2 victory against Veracruz, Cardona scored once and had three assists. Two weeks later, he scored the only goal of the match with a long range strike in a home victory against Atlas.

In February 2020, Cardona joined Club Tijuana on a one-year contract.

=== Return to Boca Juniors ===
On 21 August 2020, Cardona returned to Boca Juniors. On 8 November 2021, Cardona scored and assisted compatriot Sebastián Villa in a 3–0 victory against Aldosivi.

=== Return to Atletico Nacional ===
On 22 May 2024, Cardona returned to Atletico Nacional. He made his debut in the first matchday of the 2024 Finalizacion, scoring both of his team's goals in a 2–0 away victory against Alianza.

== International career ==
=== Youth ===
Cardona represented his country at the 2009 South American Under-17 Football Championship in Chile, where he became the top scorer with seven goals in seven matches, including a hat-trick in a 3–0 win against Ecuador. In doing so, he tremendously helped his country qualify for the 2009 FIFA U-17 World Cup due to take place in Nigeria from 24 October to 15 November. Cardona was selected to play for his country in the 2011 Toulon Tournament in France. He scored three goals in the Championships including two goals against Ivory Coast and a goal against Mexico in the semi-final. Colombia went on to win the final in a penalty shoot-out against the host nation France.

=== Senior ===
On 3 October 2014, Cardona was called up to the Colombia senior team, for the first time, by manager Jose Nestor Pekerman for the team's friendlies against El Salvador and Canada. As a starter, he made his senior debut against El Salvador.

He was called up again for Colombia's national team on 3 November 2014, this time for friendlies against the United States and Slovenia. He assisted Teófilo Gutiérrez in the 86th minute winning goal for an eventual 2–1 victory over the United States. Cardona would score his first goal for the national team against Kuwait in a 3–1 victory. Cardona scored his first goal during an official competition with the Colombia senior team during the CONMEBOL qualifiers for the Russia 2018 FIFA World Cup match against Peru which was won by Colombia 2–0.

In May 2018, Cardona was named in Colombia's preliminary 35-man roster for the 2018 FIFA World Cup in Russia. However, he was later omitted from the final 23-man squad.

== Controversy ==
In a friendly match between Colombia and South Korea in Suwon on 10 November 2017, with Colombia down 2–0 in the 62nd minute, James Rodríguez attempted to pick up Korean player Jin-Su Kim from the ground in a rough manner after Kim was fouled. Korean captain Sung-Yueng Ki lightly shoved Rodríguez, and Rodríguez then fell to the ground while pretending to cover his eye as if Ki slapped his face. Edwin Cardona was caught up in the ensuing scuffle and was caught on camera making a slant-eyed gesture toward the Korean players. Although the incident went unnoticed by the match referee, the incident sparked outrage on social media and calls for heavy FIFA punishment for Cardona. Cardona apologized the same day via Twitter (now X), stating that "I didn't mean to disrespect anyone, a country or a race, but if anyone felt offended, or interpreted it in that way, I am sorry." In December 2017, FIFA banned Cardona for five international games, although he would still be able to participate in the upcoming World Cup.

== Personal life ==
Cardona has three children, with his eldest daughter born when he was 11 and his wife was 14.

== Career statistics ==
=== Club ===
As of 15 March 2017

Appearances and goals by club, season and competition
Club	Season	League			Cup		Continental		Total	
Club	Season	Division	Apps	Goals	Apps	Goals	Apps	Goals	Apps	Goals
Atlético Nacional	2009	Categoría Primera A	16	1	2	1	0	0	18	2
Atlético Nacional	2010	Categoría Primera A	9	0	0	0	0	0	9	0
Atlético Nacional	2011	Categoría Primera A	21	7	7	1	0	0	28	8
Atlético Nacional	Total		46	8	9	2	0	0	55	10
Santa Fe (loan)	2012	Categoría Primera A	34	4	9	5	0	0	43	9
Junior (loan)	2013	Categoría Primera A	37	7	5	0	0	0	42	7
Atlético Nacional	2014	Categoría Primera A	32	10	9	2	18	5	59	17
Monterrey	2014–15	Liga MX	15	6	3	3	0	0	18	9
Monterrey	2015–16	Liga MX	36	18	5	1	0	0	41	19
Monterrey	2016–17	Liga MX	23	5	5	3	4	3	32	11
Monterrey	Total		74	29	13	7	4	3	91	39
Career total			223	58	45	16	22	8	290	82

=== International ===
Appearances and goals by national team and year
National team	Year	Apps	Goals
Colombia	2014	2	0
Colombia	2015	10	2
Colombia	2016	12	2
Colombia	2017	7	1
Colombia	2018	2	0
Colombia	2019	4	0
Colombia	2020	2	0
Colombia	2021	6	1
Total		45	6

Scores and results list Colombia's goal tally first, score column indicates score after each Cardona goal.

List of international goals scored by Edwin Cardona
No.	Date	Venue	Opponent	Score	Result	Competition
1	30 March 2015	Mohammed Bin Zayed Stadium, Abu Dhabi, United Arab Emirates	Kuwait	2–1	3–1	Friendly
2	8 October 2015	Estadio Metropolitano Roberto Meléndez, Barranquilla, Colombia	Peru	2–0	2–0	2018 FIFA World Cup qualification
3	24 March 2016	Estadio Hernando Siles, La Paz, Bolivia	Bolivia	3–2	3–2	2018 FIFA World Cup qualification
4	6 October 2016	Estadio Defensores del Chaco, Asunción, Paraguay	Paraguay	1–0	1–0	2018 FIFA World Cup qualification
5	7 June 2017	Nueva Condomina, Murcia, Spain	Spain	1–1	2–2	Friendly
6	13 June 2021	Arena Pantanal, Cuiabá, Brazil	Ecuador	1–0	1–0	2021 Copa América

== Honours ==
Atlético Nacional

- Categoría Primera A: 2011-I, 2014-I, 2024-II

Independiente Santa Fe

- Categoría Primera A: 2012-I

Boca Juniors

- Argentine Primera División: 2017–18
- Copa Argentina: 2019–20
- Copa de la Liga Profesional: 2020

Colombia U-20

- Toulon Tournament: 2011

Colombia

- Copa América Third place: 2016, 2021

Individual

- South American Under-17 Football Championship top scorer: 2009
- Star XI of the Americas: 2014
