= Adrià Carmona =

Spanish footballer

Personal information
- Full name: Adrià Carmona Pérez
- Date of birth: 8 February 1992 (age 34)
- Place of birth: Igualada, Spain
- Height: 1.72 m (5 ft 7 1/2 in)
- Positions: Winger; attacking midfielder

Youth career
- 2001–2010: Barcelona
- 2010–2011: AC Milan

Senior career*
Years	Team	Apps	(Gls)
2011–2013	AC Milan	0	(0)
2013	→ Zaragoza (loan)	3	(0)
2013–2014	Girona	18	(0)
2014–2015	Espanyol B	28	(7)
2015–2016	Albacete	22	(1)
2016–2018	Lugo	4	(0)
2018–2019	Delhi Dynamos	12	(1)
2020–2021	Hospitalet	17	(1)
Total		104	(10)

International career
2008–2009	Spain U17	17	(4)
Medal record
Men's football
Representing Spain
UEFA European Under-17 Championship
Winner	2008 Türkiye
- * Club domestic league appearances and goals

Adrià Carmona Pérez (born 8 February 1992) is a Spanish former professional footballer who played as a left winger or an attacking midfielder.

== Club career ==
Born in Igualada, Barcelona, Catalonia, Carmona arrived at FC Barcelona's youth system at the age of 9. In 2010, he moved to Italian club AC Milan to complete his development.

Carmona only appeared for the Rossoneri reserves during his spell. On 31 January 2013, he was loaned to Real Zaragoza of La Liga until the end of the season.

Carmona made his debut as a professional on 16 February 2013, playing 26 minutes in a 1–0 away loss against CA Osasuna after coming on as a substitute for veteran José María Movilla. On 1 August, he signed for Segunda División side Girona FC.

On 30 June 2014, having been sparingly used, Carmona joined RCD Espanyol B from Segunda División B. On 8 July of the following year, he moved to second division team Albacete Balompié.

Carmona scored his only goal in the second tier on 6 February 2016, opening an eventual 2–2 home draw with Real Oviedo. On 21 July, after Alba's relegation, he signed a two-year contract with CD Lugo in the same league.

On 31 August 2018, Carmona joined Delhi Dynamos FC. He scored his only goal in the Indian Super League on 4 November, in a 2–2 home draw against Jamshedpur FC.

== Career statistics ==
As of match played on 23 October 2018

Club	Season	League			Cup		Other		Total	
Club	Season	Division	Apps	Goals	Apps	Goals	Apps	Goals	Apps	Goals
AC Milan	2011–12	Serie A	0	0	0	0	0	0	0	0
AC Milan	2012–13	Serie A	0	0	0	0	0	0	0	0
AC Milan	Total		0	0	0	0	0	0	0	0
Zaragoza (loan)	2012–13	La Liga	3	0	0	0	—		3	0
Girona	2013–14	Segunda División	18	0	2	0	—		20	0
Espanyol B	2014–15	Segunda División B	28	7	—		—		28	7
Albacete	2015–16	Segunda División	22	1	0	0	—		22	1
Lugo	2016–17	Segunda División	3	0	0	0	—		3	0
Lugo	2017–18	Segunda División	1	0	0	0	—		1	0
Lugo	Total		4	0	0	0	—		4	0
Delhi Dynamos	2018–19	Indian Super League	3	0	0	0	—		3	0
Career total			78	8	2	0	0	0	80	8

== Honours ==
Spain U17

- UEFA European Under-17 Championship: 2008
- FIFA U-17 World Cup third place: 2009
