= Lamin Sarjo Samateh =

Gambian footballer

Personal information
- Date of birth: 20 December 1993 (age 32)
- Place of birth: The Gambia
- Height: 1.82 m (5 ft 11 1/2 in)
- Positions: Defender; winger

Youth career
- —2006: S. Vlaer Tallinding
- 2006-2011: Samger FC

Senior career*
Years	Team	Apps	(Gls)
2011-2015	Samger FC		
2014-2015	Atlantis FC	21	(1)
2015-2018	FE Grama		(13+)

International career
2009	Gambia U-17	4	(1)
2011	Gambia U-20	3	(0)
- * Club domestic league appearances and goals as of March 26 2024

Lamin Sarjo Samateh (born 20 December 1993) is a Gambian football defender playing with Samger FC.

Born in Fajara is career started in a local club S. Vlaer Tallinding helping them to win a series of junior league titles. He made such an impact that he became the team captain before moving to Samger FC in 2006. Samateh helped Samger FC to win the Gambian Super Cup, and a year later the club finished runner-up in the 2007-08 Gambian Championnat National D1. Scoring 11 goals in the 2010 Gambian Championship helped him win, for the second consecutive time, the SJAG Player of the Year Award.

At the national team level, he was part of the Gambian team at the 2009 FIFA U-17 World Cup. Earlier, he helped Gambia U-17 win the Pepsi Academy Football Tournament. He became part of the Gambian U-20 team that ensured qualification to the 2011 Championship in South Africa.

On March 29, 2011, he received a call for representing the Gambian national team.

On March 17, 2019, he announced his retirement from football, at the age of 25.
