= Manu Garba =

Nigerian association football manager

Personal information
- Date of birth: 31 December 1965 (age 60)

Managerial career
- Years: Team
- 2013-2015: Nigeria U17
- 2015-2018: Nigeria U20
- 2019: Nigeria U17
Medal record
Men's football
Representing Nigeria (as manager)
FIFA U-17 World Cup
Winner	2013
Africa U-20 Cup of Nations
Winner	2015

Manu Garba (born 31 December 1965) is a Nigerian association football manager. He is the current head coach of the Nigeria national under-17 football team. In November 2013, he won the FIFA U-17 World Cup. In March 2015, he won the 2015 African U-20 Championship.
