= André Gonçalves (footballer) =

Swiss-Portuguese footballer (born 1992)

Personal information
- Full name: André Caetano Gonçalves
- Date of birth: 23 January 1992 (age 34)
- Place of birth: Meiringen, Switzerland
- Height: 1.78 m (5 ft 10 in)
- Position: Right back

Team information
- Current team: FC Linth 04
- Number: 2

Youth career
- 2001–2005: FC Glarus
- 2005–2006: Rapperswil-Jona
- 2006–2010: FC Zürich

Senior career*
Years	Team	Apps	(Gls)
2009–2013	FC Zürich II	23	(1)
2010–2011	→ FC Aarau (loan)	28	(0)
2011–2012	→ FC Aarau (loan)	17	(1)
2012–2013	FC Zürich	1	(0)
2013–2019	Schaffhausen	146	(7)
2019–	FC Linth 04	13	(1)

International career
2008–2009	Switzerland U17	20	(4)
2010–2011	Switzerland U19	11	(0)
2011–2012	Switzerland U20	4	(0)
- * Club domestic league appearances and goals as of 14:03, 15 April 2020 (UTC)

André Caetano Gonçalves (born 23 January 1992) is a Swiss-Portuguese professional footballer currently playing for FC Linth 04.

== Club career ==
Gonçalves began his playing career with lower league clubs FC Glarus and FC Rapperswil-Jona before moving on to Swiss Super League club FC Zürich in 2006. After spending time with the club's youth teams, from late 2009 he started playing regularly with the reserve team. Gonçalves then went on loan to Swiss Challenge League club FC Aarau for both the 2010–11 and 2011–12 seasons in order to gain more playing experience. He returned to Zürich for the 2012–13 season. In May 2013 it was announced that he joined second tier side Schaffhausen.

Ahead of the 2019/20 season, Gonçalves joined FC Linth 04.

== International career ==
Gonçalves is a Switzerland youth international. In 2009, he was part of the Swiss under-17 team that won the 2009 FIFA U-17 World Cup beating host nation Nigeria 1—0 in the final. Gonçalves featured in all 7 matches at the tournament and scored in the team's round of 16 win against Germany.

== Honours ==
- FIFA U-17 World Cup: 2009
