= Dragan Juranović =

Croatian footballer

Personal information
- Date of birth: 10 February 1994 (age 32)
- Place of birth: Zagreb, Croatia
- Height: 1.78 m (5 ft 10 in)
- Position: Attacking midfielder

Team information
- Current team: Sesvete
- Number: 17

Youth career
- 2013–2018: Dubrava

Senior career*
Years	Team	Apps	(Gls)
2018–2019	Osijek II	3	(0)
2019	→ Rudeš (loan)	11	(2)
2019–2021	Dubrava	35	(18)
2021–2023	Zrinjski Mostar	33	(7)
2023–2025	Dubrava	61	(17)
2025–	Sesvete	31	(2)
- * Club domestic league appearances and goals as of 16 June 2026

Dragan Juranović (born 10 February 1994) is a Croatian professional footballer who plays as a winger for Sesvete.
