= Jeremiah Olaleke =

Nigerian footballer (born 2006)

Personal information
- Full name: Jeremiah Olawaseyi Olaleke
- Date of birth: 20 February 2006 (age 20)
- Place of birth: Lagos, Nigeria
- Height: 1.88 m (6 ft 2 in)
- Position: Central defender

Team information
- Current team: Sesvete
- Number: 27

Youth career
- Ablaze Football Academy

Senior career*
Years	Team	Apps	(Gls)
2024–	Sesvete	24	(1)

International career
2022–2023	Nigeria U17	8	(0)
- * Club domestic league appearances and goals as of 16 June 2026

Jeremiah Olawaseyi Olaleke (born 20 February 2006) is a Nigerian footballer who currently plays as a central defender for 1. NL club Sesvete.

== Club career ==
In June 2024, Olaleke was invited by German side Bayern Munich to be part of their World Squad initiative, representing the club in international friendlies. Shortly after, he moved from the Ablaze Football Academy in Ikorodu to Croatian 1. NL club Sesvete. He made his debut for the side on 5 October 2024, starting in a 2–0 loss to Rudeš.

== International career ==
Olaleke was called up to the Nigeria under-17 side for 2023 U-17 Africa Cup of Nations qualification (named the 2022 WAFU-B U17), and was named in the Team of the Tournament after Nigeria beat Burkina Faso in the final. At the 2023 U-17 Africa Cup of Nations, despite his side being knocked out in the quarter-finals, Olaleke drew praise from Nigerian international Kenneth Omeruo.

== Style of play ==
Described by Italian football website Calciomercato as an "explosive, fast and physically strong defender", he has earned comparisons to Brazilian international centre-back Gleison Bremer.

== Career statistics ==
=== Club ===
As of 14 October 2025

Appearances and goals by club, season and competition
Club	Season	League			Cup		Other		Total	
Club	Season	Division	Apps	Goals	Apps	Goals	Apps	Goals	Apps	Goals
Sesvete	2024–25	1. NL	7	0	0	0	0	0	7	0
Sesvete	2025–26	1. NL	2	0	0	0	0	0	2	0
Career total			9	0	0	0	0	0	9	0
