= Stanley Okoro =

Nigerian footballer

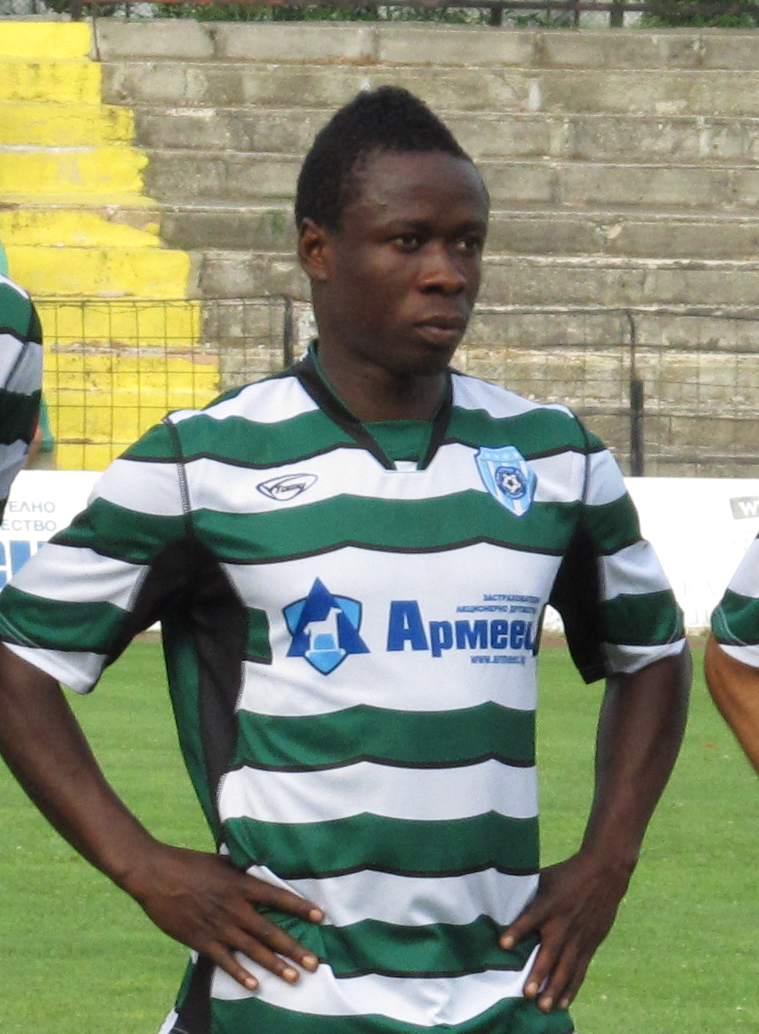

Personal information
- Full name: Stanley Osaretin Okoro
- Date of birth: 8 December 1992 (age 33)
- Place of birth: Enugu, Nigeria
- Height: 1.71 m (5 ft 7 1/2 in)
- Positions: Winger; forward

Youth career
- National Grammar
- 2005–2008: River Lane FC
- 2008–2009: Heartland
- 2010–2011: Almería

Senior career*
Years	Team	Apps	(Gls)
2009–2010	Heartland		
2011–2015	Almería B	50	(8)
2013–2014	→ Cherno More (loan)	19	(2)
2016–2017	Abia Warriors		
2017	Plateau United		

International career^{‡}
2009	Nigeria U-17	7	(3)
2011	Nigeria U-20	4	(2)
2010–	Nigeria	1	(0)
- * Club domestic league appearances and goals as of 1 December 2014 ‡ National team caps and goals as of 5 September 2010

Stanley Osaretin Okoro // (born 8 December 1992) is a Nigerian footballer who plays as a winger or forward.

== Career ==
Born in Enugu, Okoro finished his graduation with Heartland FC, after spells with River Lane FC and National Grammar School. He made his senior debuts with the former in 2009.

On 14 April 2010, Okoro joined UD Almeria in Spain, signing a four-year contract. He was initially assigned to the Juvenil squad, being promoted to the reserves in the following year.

In July 2013, Okoro moved to Bulgarian A Professional Football Group side Cherno More Varna in a season-long loan deal. He played his first match as a professional on 3 August, starting in a 0–0 draw at CSKA Sofia, and scored his first goal on 11 December, netting the first of a 2–0 win at Lokomotiv Sofia.

On 29 May 2014, Okoro was promoted to the Andalusians' main squad for the pre-season, but returned to the B-side in August. Released in the summer of 2015, he returned to his nation in 2016, signing for Abia Warriors FC.

On 7 May 2017, Okoro joined fellow Nigerian Professional Football League side Plateau United FC, but was released on 28 September.

== International career ==
Okoro appeared with the under-17 team at the 2009 FIFA U-17 World Cup, playing his first match in the tournament in a 3–3 draw against Germany and scoring his side's first goal through a penalty kick in the 54th minute. He subsequently scored against New Zealand and Spain, and was a starter in the eventual 0–1 final loss to Switzerland.

On 29 August 2010, Okoro was called up to the main squad, replacing injured Joseph Akpala for a 2012 Africa Cup of Nations qualification match against Madagascar. He made his debut on 5 September, coming on as a second-half substitute for Michael Eneramo in a 2–0 win at the U. J. Esuene Stadium.

== Personal life ==
Okoro's older brothers, Osas and Charles, are also footballers.
