= Jurica Bajić =

Croatian footballer

Personal information
- Full name: Jurica Bajić
- Date of birth: 29 February 2000 (age 26)
- Place of birth: Vinkovci, Croatia
- Height: 1.77 m (5 ft 10 in)
- Position: Midfielder

Team information
- Current team: Cibalia
- Number: 3

Youth career
- 1995–1997: Hajduk Split

Senior career*
Years	Team	Apps	(Gls)
2018−2020	Hajduk Split II	39	(9)
2020	→ Senica (loan)	1	(0)
2021−	Cibalia	41	(1)

International career^{‡}
	Croatia U14	2	(0)
	Croatia U16	8	(3)
	Croatia U17	12	(1)
	Croatia U18	4	(0)
2018	Croatia U19	4	(2)
- * Club domestic league appearances and goals as of 19 June 2023 ‡ National team caps and goals as of 20 November 2018

Jurica Bajić (born 29 February 2000) is a Croatian footballer who plays for Cibalia as a midfielder.

== Club career ==
Bajić made his professional Fortuna Liga debut for FK Senica against MŠK Žilina on 8 August 2020.
