= Umar Abubakar =

Nigerian footballer (born 2006)

Personal information
- Date of birth: 15 February 2006 (age 20)
- Place of birth: Kano, Nigeria
- Height: 1.90 m (6 ft 3 in)
- Position: Striker

Team information
- Current team: Famalicão
- Number: 9

Youth career
- Footwork FC

Senior career*
Years	Team	Apps	(Gls)
2024–2025	Footwork FC	0	(0)
2024–2025	→ Jong Gent (loan)	27	(21)
2025–	Famalicão	22	(3)

International career^{‡}
2023	Nigeria U17	2	(0)
2026–	Nigeria	1	(0)
- * Club domestic league appearances and goals as of 25 May 2026 ‡ National team caps and goals as of 6 October 2026

Umar Abubakar (born 15 February 2006) is a Nigerian professional footballer who plays as a striker for Primeira Liga club Famalicão and the Nigeria national team.

== Career ==
A youth product of the Nigerian club Footwork FC, Abubakar joined Jong Gent on loan for the 2024–25 season in the Belgian Division 1. He finished the season as top scorer for Jong Gent with 21 goals in 26 appearances. He was also nmed Jong Gent's player of the season. On 15 July 2025, he signed with Portuguese Primeira Liga club Famalicão on a five-year contract. He made his professional debut with Famalicão in a 1–0 league win over Tondela on 16 August 2025.

== International career ==
Abubakar played for the Nigeria U-17 team at the 2023 U-17 Africa Cup of Nations.

On 6 October 2026, Abubakar made his debut for the Nigeria national team in a friendly against Russia.

== Honours ==
- 2024–25 Belgian Division 1 top scorer
