= NK Sesvete =

Croatian football club

Sesvete
- Full name: Nogometni Klub Sesvete
- Founded: 1941; 85 years ago
- Ground: Stadion Sv. Josip Radnik
- Capacity: 1,200
- Chairman: Pero Karatović
- Manager: Rajko Vidović
- League: 1. NL (II)
- 2025–26: 3rd of 12
Home colours	Away colours

NK Sesvete is a Croatian football club based in the Sesvete district of the city of Zagreb.

== History ==
=== Radnik Sesvete ===
Until 8 July 2013 club was known as Radnik Sesvete when it changed its name to the current one. Since the 2011–12 season they play in Prva NL, Croatia's second level, after winning promotion in the 2010–11 season. It was the club's fifth consecutive promotion since the 2006–2007 season when they played in City of Zagreb's 3rd league (nation's 7th level).

Since 2010 NK Sesvete is Dinamo Zagreb's feeder team and numerous Dinamo's youth players are sent here on loan.

== Current squad ==
As of 1 May 2026

Note: Flags indicate national team as defined under FIFA eligibility rules; some limited exceptions apply. Players may hold more than one non-FIFA nationality.

No.	Pos.	Nation	Player
1	GK	CRO	Karlo Žiger
4	DF	NGA	Jeremiah Olaleke
5	DF	CRO	Tin Kulenović
6	DF	CRO	Marko Gasparac
7	MF	CRO	Dragan Juranović
8	MF	NGA	Moses Zambrang Barnabas
9	FW	CRO	Bartol Kardum
11	FW	CRO	Ivan Šaranić
13	MF	CRO	Domagoj Begonja
14	FW	BRA	Dioguinho
15	MF	CRO	Petar Antolkovic
17	FW	CRO	Antonio Cacic
18	FW	CRO	Viktor Kanižaj
19	DF	CRO	Vanja Sare
20	FW	CRO	Ilan Pejic

No.	Pos.	Nation	Player
21	FW	CRO	Vito Jakovljevic
23	DF	CRO	Toni Gorupec
24	MF	CRO	Robert Marijanovic
25	MF	CRO	Benjamin Budimir
26	GK	CRO	Ivan Omazic
27	FW	CRO	Antonio Kus
28	MF	NGA	Isaiah Otache
29	FW	SEN	Amad Keita
30	DF	CRO	Tino Agić
—	GK	CRO	Borna Cik
—	GK	CRO	Raul Bezeljak
—	MF	CRO	Ivan Radosevic
—	MF	CRO	David Ante Omazic
—	FW	CRO	Mateo Bacic
