= Estadio Tierra de Campeones =

Stadium in Iquique, Chile

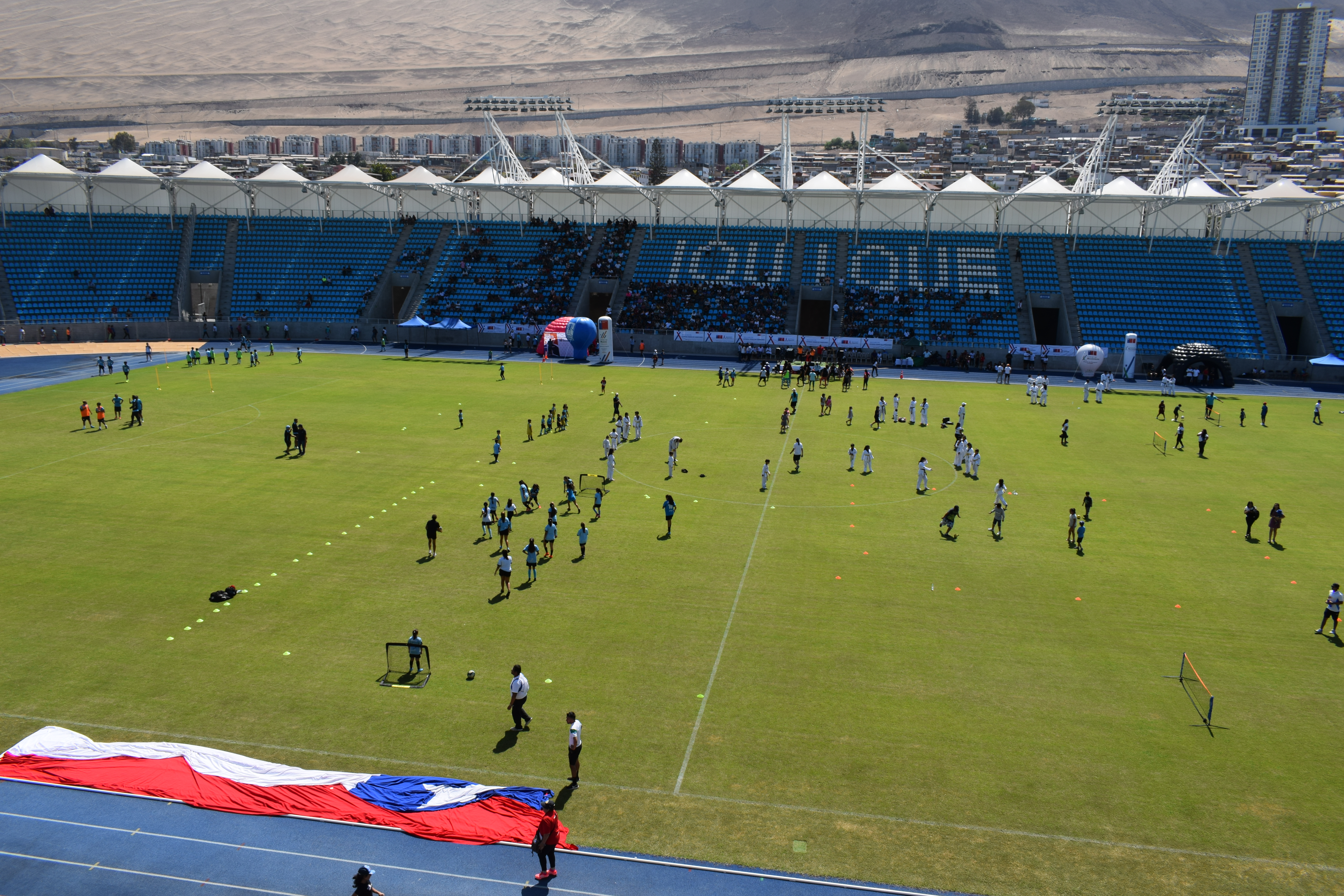
- Stadium after rebuilding in 2020
- Interactive map of Estadio Tierra de Campeones
- Full name: Estadio Municipal Tierra de Campeones Ramón Estay Saavedra
- Location: Iquique, Chile
- Coordinates: 20.242413°S 70.132937°W
- Owner: Municipality of Iquique
- Capacity: 13,171
- Surface: grass

Construction
- Opened: 1993
- Renovated: 2020

Tenant
- Deportes Iquique (1994-2016, 2020-)

The Estadio Municipal Tierra de Campeones Ramón Estay Saavedra, known as the Estadio Tierra de Campeones, is an athletics and football stadium in Iquique, Tarapaca Region, Chile. It is the home stadium of Deportes Iquique. The stadium which was built in 1993, was demolished in 2016, and re-opened in 2020.

In 1997 the stadium was one of the venues for the 1997 South American U-20 Championship.

In April and May 2009 it hosted 2009 South American Under-17 Football Championship as the main and only venue.
