= Sani Emmanuel =

Nigerian footballer (born 1992)

Personal information
- Full name: Sani Shehu Emmanuel
- Date of birth: 23 December 1992 (age 33)
- Place of birth: Edo, Nigeria
- Height: 1.70 m (5 ft 7 in)
- Position: Striker

Youth career
- 2009–2010: Bodens BK
- 2010–2012: Lazio

Senior career*
Years	Team	Apps	(Gls)
2012–2014	Lazio	0	(0)
2012	→ Salernitana (loan)	1	(0)
2013	→ Biel-Bienne (loan)	10	(5)
2014	Beitar Jerusalem	1	(0)
2015	Oskarshamns AIK	4	(1)
Total		16	(6)

International career
2009	Nigeria U17	5	(5)
2011	Nigeria U20	2	(0)
- * Club domestic league appearances and goals

Sani Shehu Emmanuel (born 23 December 1992) is a Nigerian former professional footballer who played as a striker.

== Career ==
=== Early career ===
Born in Edo, Emmanuel started his playing career in his native Nigeria for My People FC, a Nigerian football Academy based in Lagos and which was run by the Synagogue Church of Nations. In 2009 Emmanuel joined Swedish club Bodens BK where he stayed for only a few months as FIFA rules stated that he had to be 18 years old to make an international transfer. In 2010, after his award-winning performance at the 2009 FIFA U-17 World Cup, it was reported that Emmanuel had trials at both Chelsea and Tottenham Hotspur of the English Premier League. While at Tottenham Emmanuel was even offered an extended stay. However, in 2011, after trialing at several clubs in Europe, Emmanuel signed for Italian Serie A side S.S. Lazio where he was immediately put into their Primavera side. In 2012 Emmanuel signed for U.S. Salernitana 1919 of the Lega Pro Seconda Divisione on a co-owned basis from Lazio and on 9 September 2012 Emmanuel made his only appearance for the 4th tier Italian side against Chiete Calcio in which he came on in the 58th minute for Christian Chirieletti as Salernitana suffered a 4–1 defeat that day.

==== FC Biel-Bienne (loan) ====
On 16 February 2013, it was announced that Emmanuel had signed with Swiss Challenge League side FC Biel-Bienne on loan for the rest of the season. He made his debut for the club on 16 March 2013 against Wohlen in which he came on in the 72nd minute for Ramon Egli as Biel-Bienne lost the match 1–0.

On 12 May 2013, Emmanuel scored his first professional goals in a league match against FC Wohlen in which he scored a hat-trick to lead Biel-Bienne to a 7–0 victory. He scored two more goals for Biel-Bienne on 30 May 2013 against FC Winterthur as the club 2–2.

=== Beitar Jerusalem ===
In October 2014 Sani signed with Beitar Jerusalem. Three weeks later, after playing only 24 minutes for the club, Sani was released by Beitar Jerusalem, with the club stating that the coach was not excited by Sani and that he did not feature in future plans.

After leaving Beitar Jerusalem, Emmanuel had a trial at Bosnian side, FK Sarajevo, but failed in his attempt.

In November 2019 ex-teammate Ogenyi Onazi helped pay for Emmanuel's medical expenses. Emmanuel was to undergo surgery for achilles tendonitis.

== International ==
Emmanuel rose the prominence during the 2009 FIFA U-17 World Cup which was hosted in his home country Nigeria. Emmanuel finished the tournament with five goals being the joint top-scorer and won the Golden Ball as he helped Nigeria to a runners-up finish behind Switzerland.

== Career statistics ==
As of 14 April 2021

Appearances and goals by club, season and competition
Club	Season	League			Domestic Cup		League Cup		UEFA		Total	
Club	Season	Division	Apps	Goals	Apps	Goals	Apps	Goals	Apps	Goals	Apps	Goals
Salernitana (loan)	2012–13	Lega Pro Seconda Divisione	1	0	0	0	0	0	—	—	1	0
FC Biel-Bienne (loan)	2012–13	Swiss Challenge League	10	5	0	0	0	0	—	—	10	5
Beitar Jerusalem	2014–15	Israeli Premier League	1	0	0	0	0	0	0	0	1	0
Oskarshamns AIK	2015	Swedish Division 1	4	1	0	0	0	0	0	0	4	1
Career total			16	6	0	0	0	0	0	0	16	6
