= Toni Gorupec =

Croatian footballer

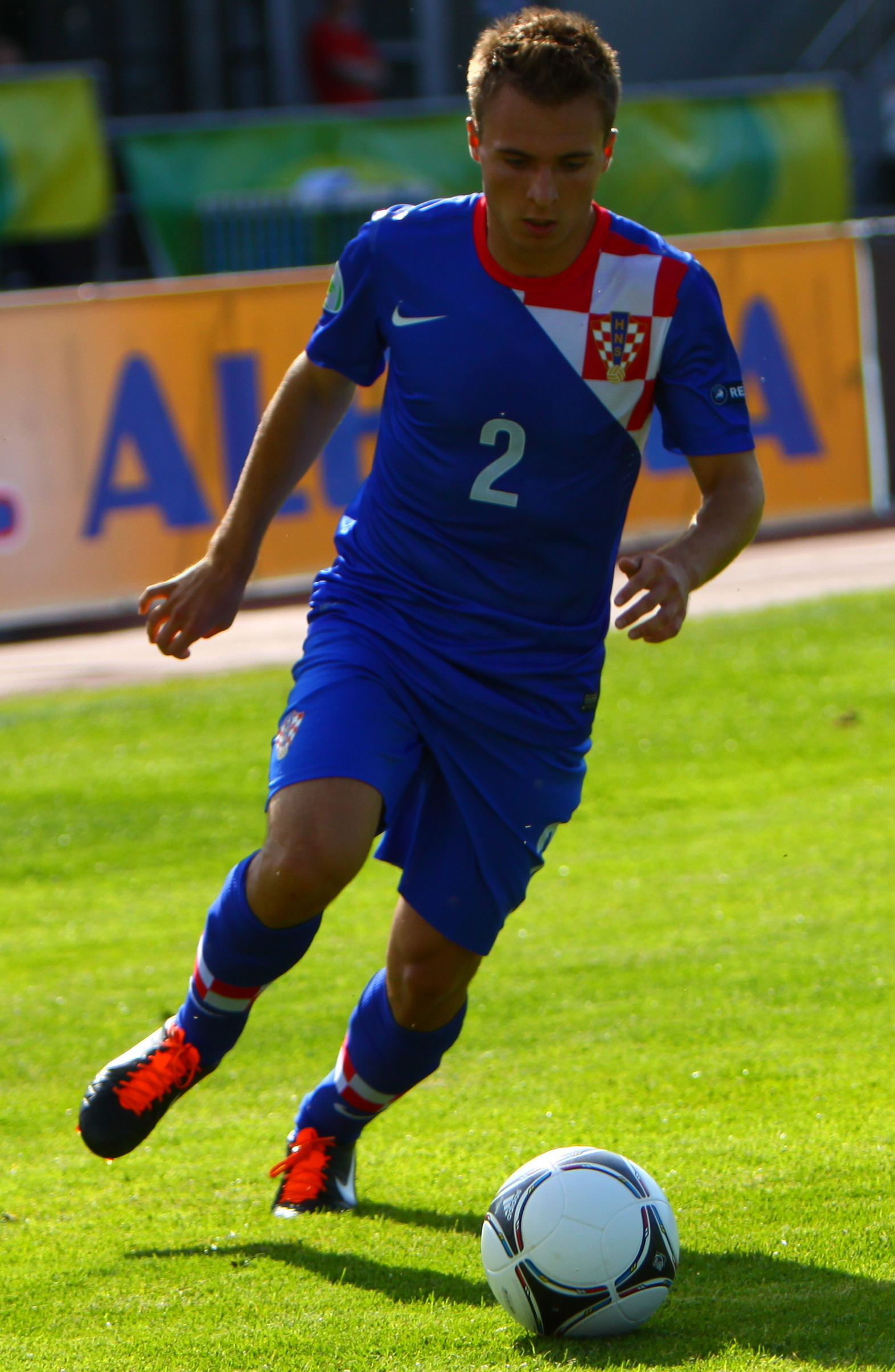
- Gorupec playing for Croatia U19 in 2012

Personal information
- Full name: Toni Gorupec
- Date of birth: 4 July 1993 (age 33)
- Place of birth: Zagreb, Croatia
- Height: 1.78 m (5 ft 10 in)
- Position: Right back

Team information
- Current team: NK Sesvete
- Number: 23

Youth career
- Dinamo Zagreb

Senior career*
Years	Team	Apps	(Gls)
2011–2013	Dinamo Zagreb	0	(0)
2011–2013	→ Radnik Sesvete (loan)	43	(0)
2013–2014	Lokomotiva	25	(0)
2015	Astra Giurgiu	11	(0)
2015–2018	Vitória Setúbal	13	(0)
2017–2018	→ Santa Clara (loan)	11	(0)
2018–2019	Kurilovec		
2019	Hrvatski Dragovoljac	12	(0)
2019–2020	Rudeš	16	(0)
2020–2022	Ethnikos Achna	58	(1)
2023	Olympiakos Nicosia	9	(0)
2024–	NK Sesvete	39	(1)

International career
2009	Croatia U16	5	(0)
2009–2010	Croatia U17	14	(1)
2010–2012	Croatia U19	23	(0)
2012–2013	Croatia U20	9	(0)
2013–2014	Croatia U21	7	(0)
- * Club domestic league appearances and goals as of 16 June 2026

Toni Gorupec (born 4 July 1993) is a Croatian professional footballer who plays for NK Sesvete as a right back.

== Club career ==
On 20 September 2013, Gorupec made his professional debut playing for Lokomotiva against Hrvatski Dragovoljac where he started the match.
