= Terry Envoh =

Nigerian footballer

Personal information
- Full name: Terrence Envoh
- Place of birth: Jos, Plateau State
- Height: 1.73 m (5 ft 8 in)
- Position: Winger

Team information
- Current team: Bayelsa United F.C.

Youth career
- LEA Primary School Tudun Wada
- 2007–2010: Festac Sports F.C.

Senior career*
Years	Team	Apps	(Gls)
2008–2010	→ Mighty Jets (loan)		
2010	Dolphins		
2010–2012	Sharks F.C.		
2013	Bayelsa United F.C.		
2014–	Enugu Rangers		

International career
2009	Nigeria U17	7	(1)
2011	Nigeria U20	4	(1)
- * Club domestic league appearances and goals

Terrence Envoh is a Nigerian footballer. He currently plays for Enugu Rangers.

== Career ==
Envoh began his career with LEA Primary School Tudun Wada and signed in 2007 with Mighty Jets of Jos Nigeria. His talent was soon discovered by Nigerian premier league side Sharks F.C. of Port Harcourt where he played regularly as a winger / attacking midfielder. He moved to Bayelsa United for the 2013 season after unsuccessful trials in Switzerland. In February 2014, he followed coach John Obuh to Rangers of Enugu.

== International career ==
Envoh played for the Nigeria national under-17 football team at 2009 FIFA U-17 World Cup in Nigeria and scored one goal against South Korea, Nigeria lost to Switzerland in the finals of the competition. He was also a member of the Nigerian U-20 squad at the 2011 FIFA U-20 World Cup.
