= Shuto Kojima =

Japanese footballer (born 1992)

Shuto Kojima 小島 秀仁
Personal information
- Full name: Shuto Kojima
- Date of birth: 30 July 1992 (age 34)
- Place of birth: Nogi, Tochigi, Japan
- Height: 1.78 m (5 ft 10 in)
- Position: Centre midfielder

Youth career
- Sagawano FCJ Powers
- Verdy SS Oyama
- 2008–2010: Maebashi Ikuei High School

Senior career*
Years	Team	Apps	(Gls)
2011–2015	Urawa Red Diamonds	14	(0)
2014	→ Tokushima Vortis (loan)	11	(0)
2015–2017	Ehime FC	94	(8)
2018–2022	JEF United Chiba	85	(3)
2023–2024	YSCC Yokohama	36	(0)

International career
2009	Japan U-17	3	(1)
2010	Japan U-19	9	(0)
Medal record
Urawa Reds
Runner-up	J.League Cup	2011
Runner-up	J.League Cup	2013
Runner-up	Emperor's Cup	2015
- * Club domestic league appearances and goals as of 14 January 2023, 11:11 (UTC)

Shuto Kojima (小島 秀仁, Kojima Shūto; born 30 July 1992) is a Japanese footballer. He currently plays for YSCC Yokohama.

== Career ==
On 14 January 2023, Kojima announcement officially transfer to J3 club, YSCC Yokohama for ahead of 2023 season.

== National team career ==
In October 2009, Kojima was elected Japan U-17 national team for 2009 U-17 World Cup. He played all 3 matches and scored a goal against Switzerland.

== Club statistics ==
Updated to the start from 2023 season.

Club	Season	League		Emperor's Cup		J. League Cup		AFC		Total	
Club	Season	Apps	Goals	Apps	Goals	Apps	Goals	Apps	Goals	Apps	Goals
Urawa Red Diamonds	2011	6	0	3	0	5	0	-		14	0
Urawa Red Diamonds	2012	7	0	0	0	5	1	-		12	1
Urawa Red Diamonds	2013	1	0	2	1	0	0	-		3	1
Tokushima Vortis	2014	11	0	2	0	3	0	-		1	0
Urawa Red Diamonds	2015	0	0	-		-		1	0	1	0
Ehime FC	2015	17	0	2	0	-		-		19	0
Ehime FC	2016	39	2	2	0	-		-		41	2
Ehime FC	2017	38	6	1	0	-		-		39	6
JEF United Chiba	2018	25	3	1	0	-		-		26	3
JEF United Chiba	2019	16	0	1	0	-		-		17	0
JEF United Chiba	2020	20	0	0	0	-		-		20	0
JEF United Chiba	2021	17	0	1	0	-		-		18	0
JEF United Chiba	2022	7	0	0	0	-		-		7	0
YSCC Yokohama	2023	0	0	0	0	-		-		0	0
Career total		214	11	16	1	14	1	1	0	239	13
