= Ufuk Özbek =

Turkish footballer

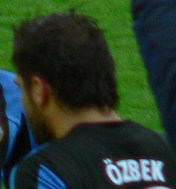
- Özbek in 2010

Personal information
- Date of birth: 1 September 1992 (age 34)
- Place of birth: Castrop-Rauxel, Germany
- Height: 1.81 m (5 ft 11 in)
- Position: Attacking midfielder

Team information
- Current team: Değirmenderespor

Youth career
- –2003: Blau-Gelb Schwerin
- 2003–2010: Schalke 04

Senior career*
| Years | Team | Apps | (Gls) |
| 2010–2013 | 1. FC Saarbrücken | 64 | (9) |
| 2013–2015 | Borussia Dortmund II | 10 | (0) |
| 2016–2017 | Rot Weiss Ahlen | 7 | (0) |
| 2017 | Kastamonuspor | 4 | (0) |
| 2017–2018 | Tepecikspor | 6 | (1) |
| 2018 | Dardanelspor | 14 | (3) |
| 2018–2019 | Aydinspor 1923 | 12 | (3) |
| 2019 | Devrek Belediyespor | 7 | (0) |
| 2019–2020 | Çayırovaspor | 9 | (5) |
| 2020–2021 | Gönen Belediyespor | 9 | (4) |
| 2021– | Değirmenderespor | 16 | (6) |

International career
| 2008–2009 | Turkey U17 | 13 | (3) |
| 2009–2010 | Turkey U18 | 5 | (1) |
- * Club domestic league appearances and goals as of 08:58, 1 June 2022 (UTC)

Ufuk Özbek (born 1 September 1992) is a Turkish professional footballer who plays as an attacking midfielder for Değirmenderespor. He is the brother of Barış Özbek who is also a midfielder.

== Career ==
Özbek spent several years with Schalke 04's youth team, before joining 1. FC Saarbrücken in 2010. He made his debut in the club's first ever match in the 3. Liga, when he replaced Nico Weißmann in a 2–0 defeat against Kickers Offenbach. In July 2013 he moved to Borussia Dortmund II.
