= Romário (footballer, born 1993) =

Brazilian footballer

Personal information
- Full name: Romário da Silva Santos
- Date of birth: 18 December 1993 (age 32)
- Place of birth: Salvador, Bahia, Brazil
- Height: 1.78 m (5 ft 10 in)
- Position: Right back

Youth career
- –2014: Vitória
- 2013–2014: → 1899 Hoffenheim (loan)

Senior career*
Years	Team	Apps	(Gls)
2011–2016	Vitória	25	(0)
2016	→ Londrina (loan)	7	(0)
2017	Vitória da Conquista		
2018	Santa Rita	5	(0)
2019	Vitória das Tabocas	2	(0)
2020	Boca Júnior	1	(0)

International career^{‡}
2008–2009	Brazil U-17	8	(2)
- * Club domestic league appearances and goals as of 2 November 2021 ‡ National team caps and goals as of 16 September 2013

Romário da Silva Santos, known as just Romário, is a Brazilian footballer who plays as a right back for Vitória das Tabocas.
