= Mohammed Sabeel (footballer, born 1993) =

Emirati footballer

Personal information
- Full name: Mohammed Sabeel Obaid
- Date of birth: 13 April 1993 (age 33)
- Place of birth: United Arab Emirates
- Height: 1.71 m (5 ft 7 1/2 in)
- Position: Defender

Youth career
- Al-Nasr

Senior career*
Years	Team	Apps	(Gls)
2011–2012	Al-Nasr	0	(0)
2012–2020	Shabab Al-Ahli	50	(1)
2020–2023	AL-Wasl	43	(0)
- * Club domestic league appearances and goals

Mohammed Sabeel (Arabic:محمد سبيل) (born 13 April 1993) is an Emirati footballer. He currently plays as a defender.
