= Engin Bekdemir =

Turkish footballer (born 1992)

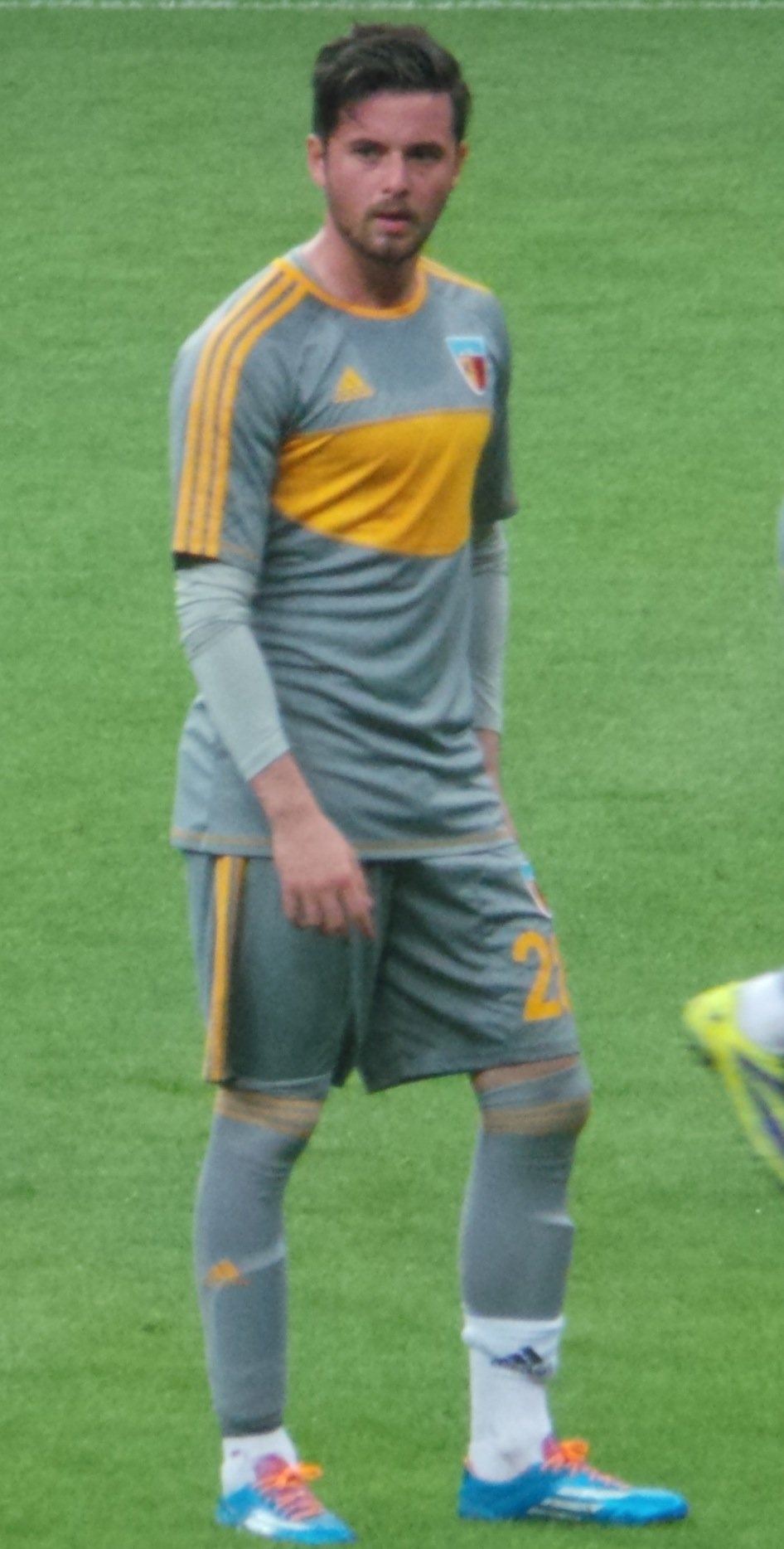
- Engin Bekdemir in 2014

Personal information
- Date of birth: 7 February 1992 (age 34)
- Place of birth: Beringen, Belgium
- Height: 1.71 m (5 ft 7 in)
- Position: Midfielder

Team information
- Current team: Sarıyer
- Number: 7

Youth career
- 2000–2001: Beringen
- 2001–2009: PSV
- 2009–2011: Porto

Senior career*
Years	Team	Apps	(Gls)
2011–2014	Kayserispor	28	(0)
2014–2015	Çaykur Rizespor	12	(0)
2015–2016	Eskişehirspor	27	(7)
2016–2018	Osmanlıspor	3	(0)
2019	Gençlerbirliği	0	(0)
2019	Altınordu	1	(0)
2020	Fatih Karagümrük	8	(0)
2020	Çaykur Rizespor	0	(0)
2020–2021	Ankaraspor	14	(0)
2021–2022	Etimesgut Belediyespor	16	(2)
2022–2023	Ankaraspor	29	(3)
2023–	Sarıyer	6	(0)

International career
2007	Turkey U15	1	(0)
2007–2008	Turkey U16	17	(2)
2008–2009	Turkey U17	20	(3)
2009–2010	Turkey U18	7	(1)
2010–2011	Turkey U19	11	(5)
2013	Turkey U21	1	(0)
- * Club domestic league appearances and goals as of 1 October 2023

Engin Bekdemir (born 7 February 1992) is a professional footballer who plays as an attacking midfielder for TFF Second League club Sarıyer. Born in Belgium, he has represented Turkey at international levels up to under-21s.

== Career ==
=== Kayserispor ===
Engin Bekdemir joined Kayserispor from Portuguese club Porto during 2011 summer transfer period. He made his Turkish Süper Lig debut in the starting line-up in which Kayserispor were beaten by Fenerbahçe with 0–1 final score, on 23 September 2011.

== Statistics ==
Correct as of 30 June 2015.

Club	Season	League		Cup		Europe		Total	
Club	Season	Apps	Goals	Apps	Goals	Apps	Goals	Apps	Goals
Kayserispor	2011–12	6	0	0	0	—		6	0
Kayserispor	2012–13	12	0	0	0	—		12	0
Kayserispor	2013–14	10	0	2	0	—		12	0
Kayserispor	Total	28	0	2	0	—		30	0
Çaykur Rizespor	2014–15	12	0	6	2	—		18	2
Çaykur Rizespor	Total	12	0	6	2	—		18	2
Career total		40	0	8	2	—		48	2

== Personal life ==
Bekdemir is the youngest of four siblings. He belongs to a family originally from Giresun, Turkey, that immigrated to Belgium.
