= Héctor Quiñones =

Colombian footballer (born 1992)

Personal information
- Full name: Héctor Andrés Quiñones Cortés
- Date of birth: March 17, 1992 (age 34)
- Place of birth: Barbacoas, Colombia
- Height: 1.78 m (5 ft 10 in)
- Position: Full back

Youth career
- Deportivo Cali

Senior career*
Years	Team	Apps	(Gls)
2009–2011	Deportivo Cali	20	(0)
2012	Atlético Junior	10	(1)
2012–2015	Porto	1	(0)
2012–2014	Porto B	53	(0)
2014–2015	→ Penafiel (loan)	24	(3)
2016	Millonarios	10	(0)
2017	Atlético Junior	3	(0)
2017–2018	Paços de Ferreira	18	(1)
2018–2021	América de Cali	38	(1)

International career
2009–2010	Colombia U17	3	(0)
2010–2012	Colombia U20	3	(0)
- * Club domestic league appearances and goals as of 21 October 2021

Hector Quiñones (born 17 March 1992), known as Quiño, is a retired Colombian football defender.

== Club ==
=== Early career ===
Hector was part of the youth academy of Deportivo Cali. After making his debut in 2010, he played with them for a single season where they won the Copa Colombia in his debut year. Eventually, he transferred to Junior de Barranquilla where he became a stand out, attracting foreign scouts. Which led to being signed by F.C. Porto during the winter transfer in 2012.

=== Porto ===
For the remainder of the 2012-2013 season, Héctor spent most of his playing appearances with Porto's B team. After 10 appearances, on 23 February 2013, Quiñones made his first performance, for Porto's first team. It was a game against Rio Ave, which Porto won by 2–0. Despite making only one appearance for the 2012–13 season, Porto went on to win the league title.

=== F.C. Penafiel ===
Hector went to newly promoted Penafiel for a one-season length loan for the 2014–15 season in Portugal. On 13 December 2014, Quiñones scored his first league goal for Penafiel in a 2–1 win over C.D. Nacional.

== International ==
He was a member of the Colombia national under-17 football team that finished 4th place at the 2009 edition of the U-17 FIFA World Cup. After successful performance representing Colombia, he took part in the 2011 Toulon Tournament representing the Colombia national under-20 football team. He scored his first goal against Italy in a 1–1 draw, during the group stages and eventually won the Tournament with Colombia.

He also took part at the 2011 U-20 FIFA World Cup that was held in Colombia.

Hector was called up to represent Colombia during the 2014 FIFA World Cup qualification against Bolivia and Venezuela. However, he suffered an injury and missed his call up.

== Honors ==
=== Club ===
Deporto Cali

- Copa Colombia (1): 2010

Porto

- Primeira Liga (1): 2012–13

Porto B

- Segunda Liga (1): 2013–14

=== Country ===
U-20 Colombia

- Toulon Tournament (1): 2011
