= Sebastián Gallegos =

Uruguayan footballer (born 1992)

Personal information
- Full name: Sebastián Agustín Gallegos Berriel
- Date of birth: 18 January 1992 (age 34)
- Place of birth: Treinta y Tres, Uruguay
- Height: 1.72 m (5 ft 8 in)
- Positions: Attacking midfielder; winger

Team information
- Current team: Palestino

Youth career
- Danubio

Senior career*
Years	Team	Apps	(Gls)
2009–2012	Atlético Madrid B	6	(0)
2010	Atlético Madrid	0	(0)
2011–2012	→ CF Badalona (loan)	8	(0)
2012–2013	Peñarol	13	(2)
2013–2014	Como	10	(2)
2014–2015	Petrolul Ploiești	2	(0)
2015–2016	Real Garcilaso	33	(6)
2017	Cobresal	11	(1)
2017	Atenas	4	(2)
2018	Hawkesbury City	13	(3)
2019	Sydney United 58	12	(1)
2019	Fénix	4	(0)
2020–2021	Central Español	41	(7)
2022	Unión San Felipe	30	(1)
2023	Guabirá	12	(0)
2023	Universidad de Concepción	12	(1)
2024–2025	Deportes La Serena	56	(7)
2026–	Palestino	0	(0)

International career
2008–2009	Uruguay U17	5	(5)
2010–2011	Uruguay U20	6	(1)
- * Club domestic league appearances and goals as of 29 December 2025

Sebastián Agustín Gallegos Berriel (born 18 January 1992) is a Uruguayan footballer who plays as an attacking midfielder or winger for Chilean club Palestino.

== Club career ==
Gallegos started playing in Danubio F.C. youth system alongside Uruguay U15 and Uruguay U17. After his good performances with the Uruguay national football team youth levels, many well known European clubs showed interest in Gallegos. But finally, on 20 July 2009, he signed a contract with Atlético Madrid B. On 31 July 2011, he was loaned out one season to CF Badalona. After playing eight games in the 2011–12 season, Gallegos returned to his country. On 23 August 2012, he joined Peñarol on a two-year contract. On 9 September 2013, he was signed on a free transfer by Como Calcio 1907, where he played 10 games and scored 2 goals in the 2013–14 Serie C2 season. The following year, he changed teams again and joined Petrolul Ploiești in Romania.

In 2024, Gallegos signed with Deportes La Serena from Universidad de Concepción. He left them at the end of 2025.

On 30 December 2025, Gallegos signed with Palestino.

== International career ==
Gallegos played the 2009 FIFA U-17 World Cup with Uruguay scoring 5 goals in 5 matches and became the championship's top scorer, a title shared with other three players. He had also been capped by the U20 team for the 2011 South American Youth Championship.

== Honours ==
Peñarol

- Primera División Uruguaya (1): 2012–13
