= Nam Seung-woo =

South Korean footballer

Personal information
- Date of birth: 18 February 1992 (age 34)
- Place of birth: South Korea
- Height: 1.77 m (5 ft 10 in)
- Position: Midfielder

Team information
- Current team: Gangwon FC
- Number: 13

Senior career*
| Years | Team | Apps | (Gls) |
| 2013–2014 | JEF United Chiba | 27 | (1) |
| 2015 | Tubize | 7 | (0) |
| 2016 | Yongin City | 24 | (1) |
| 2017 | Gimhae FC | 17 | (1) |
| 2018– | Gangwon FC | 1 | (0) |
Korean name
| Hangul | 남승우 |
| Hanja | 南昇佑 |
| RR | Nam Seungu |
| MR | Nam Sŭngu |
- * Club domestic league appearances and goals as of 26 January 2019

Nam Seung-woo (born 18 February 1992) is a South Korean football midfielder. As of 2014, he was playing for Gangwon FC.
