= Richard Caicedo =

Ecuadorian footballer (born 1992)

Richard
Personal information
- Full name: Richard Anderson Caicedo Rodríguez
- Date of birth: 23 December 1992 (age 33)
- Place of birth: Guayaquil, Ecuador
- Position: Forward

Senior career*
Years	Team	Apps	(Gls)
2013	LDU Loja	8	(0)
2013–2014	Trofense	4	(0)
2015	Deportivo Azogues		
- * Club domestic league appearances and goals

Richard Anderson Caicedo Rodríguez (born 23 December 1992) is an Ecuadorian former footballer who played as a forward.

== Club career ==
Caicedo played in Portugal for Trofense.
