= Fabien Jarsalé =

French footballer (born 1990)

Personal information
- Date of birth: 20 August 1990 (age 36)
- Place of birth: Vannes, France
- Height: 1.90 m (6 ft 3 in)
- Position: Midfielder

Team information
- Current team: Vertou

Senior career*
Years	Team	Apps	(Gls)
2008–2013	Vannes OC	56	(4)
2013–2014	SR Colmar	14	(0)
2014–2016	Stade Bordelais	37	(3)
2017–	Vertou	30	(0)

International career
2011	France U20	4	(1)
- * Club domestic league appearances and goals as of 11:57, 6 December 2018 (UTC)

Fabien Jarsalé (born 20 August 1990) is a French professional football player. Currently, he plays in the Championnat National 3 for Vertou.
