= Jorge Luis Ramos =

Colombian footballer (born 1992)

Personal information
- Full name: Jorge Luis Ramos Sánchez
- Date of birth: October 2, 1992 (age 34)
- Place of birth: Cartagena de Indias, Colombia
- Height: 1.84 m (6 ft 0 in)
- Position: Forward

Team information
- Current team: Santa Fe
- Number: 29

Youth career
- –2007: Real Cartagena

Senior career*
Years	Team	Apps	(Gls)
2008–2011	Real Cartagena	45	(7)
2011–2014	Santa Fe	21	(0)
2013–2014	→ Fortaleza CEIF (loan)	55	(11)
2015	Uniautónoma	35	(1)
2016–2018	Atlético Huila	87	(8)
2018–2020	Deportes Tolima	36	(4)
2020–2022	Santa Fe	51	(12)
2022	Alvarado	17	(3)
2023	La Equidad	25	(2)
2024-	Águilas Doradas	23	(3)
2025	Águila	14	(2)
2025-	Santa Fe	2	(0)
- * Club domestic league appearances and goals as of 11 December 2025

Jorge Luis Ramos Sánchez (born October 2, 1992) is a Colombian professional footballer who plays as a forward for Santa Fe.

== Career statistics ==
=== Club ===
As of 27 February 2025.

Club	Division	Season	League		Cup		Continental		Total	
Club	Division	Season	Apps	Goals	Apps	Goals	Apps	Goals	Apps	Goals
Real Cartagena	Categoría Primera B	2008	18	3	?		—		18	3
Real Cartagena	Categoría Primera A	2009	13	1	?		—		13	1
Real Cartagena	Categoría Primera A	2010	7	3	3	0	—		10	3
Real Cartagena	Categoría Primera A	2011	7	0	4	0	—		11	0
Real Cartagena	Total		45	7	7	0	0	0	52	7
Santa Fe	Categoría Primera A	2011	13	0	0	0	1	0	14	0
Santa Fe	Categoría Primera A	2012	7	0	6	2	—		13	2
Santa Fe	Categoría Primera A	2013	1	0	7	0	0	0	8	0
Fortaleza CEIF	Categoría Primera B	2013	25	4	5	2	—		30	6
Fortaleza CEIF	Categoría Primera A	2014	30	7	4	1	—		34	8
Fortaleza CEIF	Total		55	11	9	3	0	0	64	14
Uniautónoma	Categoría Primera A	2015	35	1	1	0	—		36	1
Atlético Huila	Categoría Primera A	2016	32	6	1	1	—		33	7
Atlético Huila	Categoría Primera A	2017	34	2	2	1	—		36	3
Atlético Huila	Categoría Primera A	2018	21	0	2	0	—		23	0
Atlético Huila	Total		87	8	5	2	0	0	92	10
Deportes Tolima	Categoría Primera A	2018	7	1	0	0	—		7	1
Deportes Tolima	Categoría Primera A	2019	26	3	4	1	1	0	31	4
Deportes Tolima	Categoría Primera A	2020	3	0	0	0	1	0	4	0
Deportes Tolima	Total		36	4	4	1	2	0	42	5
Santa Fe	Categoría Primera A	2020	18	7	1	0	—		19	7
Santa Fe	Categoría Primera A	2021	32	5	3	1	6	0	41	6
Santa Fe	Categoría Primera A	2022	1	0	—		—		1	0
Santa Fe	Total		72	12	17	3	7	0	96	15
Alvarado	Primera B Nacional	2022	17	3	—		—		17	3
La Equidad	Categoría Primera A	2023	25	2	2	0	—		27	2
Águilas Doradas	Categoría Primera A	2024	23	3	2	1	2	0	27	4
FAS	Primera División de Fútbol de El Salvador	2025	5	0	—		—		5	0
Career total			400	51	47	10	11	0	458	61

== Honours ==
Real Cartagena

- Categoría Primera B: 2008

Independiente de Santa Fe

- Categoría Primera A: 2012 Apertura
