= Nigeria national under-17 football team =

National under-17 association football team representing Nigeria

Nigeria Under-17
- Nickname: Golden Eaglets
- Association: Nigeria Football Association
- Confederation: CAF (Africa)
- Sub-confederation: WAFU (West Africa)
- Head coach: Manu Garba
- Home stadium: Abuja Stadium
- FIFA code: NGA
First colours	Second colours

Biggest win
- Nigeria 8–0 Canada (, Japan; 1993)

Biggest defeat
- France 3–0 Nigeria (Port of Spain, Trinidad and Tobago; 30 September 2001); Benin 3–0 Nigeria (Porto-Novo, Benin; 2009)

FIFA U-17 World Cup
- Appearances: 12 (first in 1985)
- Best result: Champions (1985, 1993, 2007, 2013, 2015)

Africa U-17 Cup of Nations
- Appearances: 10 (first in 1995)
- Best result: Champions (2001, 2007)

The Nigeria national U-17 football team, known as the Golden Eaglets, is the youngest team that represents Nigeria in football. The team is the most successful in international football for their age group, winning a record five FIFA U-17 World Cup titles and have been runners-up on three occasions. They are also two-time Africa U-17 Cup of Nations champions with their most recent title at the 2007 edition.

== History ==
The team won the maiden edition of FIFA U-17 World Cup in 1985 hosted by China, as well as the 1993, 2007, 2013, and 2015 editions (becoming only the second team since Brazil to win it back to back); making them the first team ever to win the junior world cup five times. They also won the African Under-17 Championship in 2001 and 2007, and were runners-up in 1995 and 2013.

After the 2007 World Cup victory there was some discussion as to whether the success should be rewarded in the form of cash, or if longer-term investments were more suitable for teenage players. It was pointed out that some previous players had found themselves reduced to poverty due to injury or mismanagement of their funds.

Heading into the 2009 FIFA U-17 World Cup, head coach Henry Nwosu was replaced by John Obuh, coach of Kwara United.

Although Nigeria failed to qualify for the 2011 FIFA U-17 World Cup, they participated again in the 2013 edition of the tournament. Planning was thrown into disarray however in August when key members of the team was determined by MRI scanning to be overage and excluded from the team. In their first match, the team defeated the defending champions Mexico with a 6–1 score. They only failed to defeat Sweden in the group stage, but they did so in the semi-finals. In the final match they defeated Mexico for a second time, obtaining their fourth U-17 World Cup and becoming the national team to win the most U-17 tournaments as at 2023.

The team were again the subject of age-cheating accusations when, a total of 26 players from the 60-strong squad were sent home from their training camp in 2016 after failing compulsory MRI scans used to determine age ahead of an African Cup of Nations qualifier. Amidst all the age cheating accusations, the team has never been found guilty of fielding overage players in any competition. All the players accused of being overage were caught at the Abuja training camp and sent home before they played any game for the team.

== Competitive record ==
=== FIFA U-17 World Cup record ===
FIFA U-17 World Cup record
Year	Round	Position	GP	W	D*	L	GS	GA
(China) 1985	Champions	1st	6	4	2	0	10	2
(Canada) 1987	Runners-up	2nd	6	3	2	1	7	5
(Scotland) 1989	Quarter-finals	6th	4	2	2	0	7	0
(Italy) 1991	did not qualify							
(Japan) 1993	Champions	1st	6	6	0	0	20	3
(Ecuador) 1995	Quarter-finals	7th	4	2	1	1	6	4
(Egypt) 1997	did not qualify							
(New Zealand) 1999	did not qualify							
(Trinidad and Tobago) 2001	Runners-up	2nd	6	5	0	1	14	5
(Finland) 2003	Group stage	11th	3	1	1	1	3	3
(Peru) 2005	did not qualify							
(South Korea) 2007	Champions	1st	7	6	1	0	16	4
(Nigeria) 2009	Runners-up	2nd	7	5	1	1	17	7
(Mexico) 2011	did not qualify							
(United Arab Emirates) 2013	Champions	1st	7	6	1	0	26	5
(Chile) 2015	Champions	1st	7	6	0	1	23	5
(India) 2017	did not qualify							
(Brazil) 2019	Round of 16	15th	4	2	0	2	9	9
(Indonesia) 2023	did not qualify							
(Qatar) 2025	did not qualify							
(Qatar) 2026	did not qualify							
Total	12/21	5 Titles	67	48	11	8	158	52

=== U-17 Africa Cup of Nations record ===
U-17 Africa Cup of Nations
Year	Round	Position	GP	W	D*	L	GS	GA
(Mali) 1995	Runners-up	2nd	5	4	0	1	13	5
(Botswana) 1997	did not qualify							
(Guinea) 1999	Group stage	6th	3	1	1	1	5	5
(Seychelles) 2001	Champions	1st	5	3	2	0	13	4
(Eswatini) 2003	Third place	3rd	5	4	0	1	9	2
(The Gambia) 2005	Group stage	6th	3	1	1	1	8	6
(Togo) 2007	Champions	1st	5	5	0	0	15	1
(Algeria) 2009	did not qualify							
(Rwanda) 2011	did not qualify							
(Morocco) 2013	Runners-up	2nd	5	3	1	1	18	5
(Niger) 2015	Fourth place	4th	5	2	1	2	7	6
(Gabon) 2017	did not qualify							
(Tanzania) 2019	Fourth place	4th	2	2	1	2	5	9
(Algeria) 2023	Quarter-finals	-	4	2	0	2	5	5
(Morocco) 2025	Did not qualify							
Total	10/15	2 titles	45	27	7	11	98	58

A gold background colour indicates that Nigeria won the tournament.

*Draws include knockout matches decided on penalty kicks.

== Team honours and achievements ==
Intercontinental

- FIFA U-17 World Cup
  - Winners: 1985, 1993, 2007, 2013, 2015
  - Runners-up: 1987, 2001, 2009

Continental

- Africa U-17 Cup of Nations
  - Winners: 2001, 2007
  - Runners-up: 1995, 2013
  - Third-place: 2003

Others

- UEFA–CAF Meridian Cup
  - Winners: 1997

== Staff ==
=== Management ===
- Team Coordinator: Suleiman Abubakar
- Secretary: Egbaiyelo Tayo
- Media Coordinator: Morakinyo Abodunrin

=== Sports ===
- Head coach: Nduka Ugbade
- Assistant coach:
- Assistant coach:
- Scout:
- Goalkeeper coach:

=== Medical ===
- Doctor: Olarinoye Ayodeji
- Physiotherapist: Oyegunna Gabriel
- Equipment Manager: Mohammed Kafa Usman

== Current squad ==
The following players were named in the squad for the 2023 U-17 Africa Cup of Nations between 29 April – 19 May.

Caps and goals are correct as of 1 May 2023, after the match against Mali.

No.	Pos.	Player	Date of birth (age)	Caps	Goals	Club
1	GK	Richard Odoh	23 November 2006 (age 19)	3	0	(Nigeria Football Federation) HB Abuja
16	GK	Temiloluwa Adelakin	12 June 2006 (age 20)	0	0	(Nigeria Football Federation) Box2Box
23	GK	Gift Adie	7 February 2007 (age 19)	0	0	(Nigeria Football Federation) Paul E
2	DF	Yahaya Lawali	6 June 2006 (age 20)	3	0	(Nigeria Football Federation) Mahanaim
3	DF	Emmanuel Michael	16 June 2006 (age 20)	3	0	(Nigeria Football Federation) Simon Ben
5	DF	Joseph Ogboji	15 December 2006 (age 19)	3	0	(Nigeria Football Federation) Purple Crown
6	DF	Jeremiah Olaleke	20 February 2006 (age 20)	3	0	(Nigeria Football Federation) Ablaze
15	DF	Israel Usulor	20 June 2007 (age 19)	0	0	(Nigeria Football Federation) Real Sapphire
21	DF	Chijoke Linus	31 July 2006 (age 20)	0	0	(Nigeria Football Federation) Triple 44
22	DF	Quadri Adewale	7 September 2007 (age 19)	1	0	(Nigeria Football Federation) Nathaniel Boys
4	MF	Haruna Abdullahi	1 January 2007 (age 19)	0	0	(Nigeria Football Federation) Kurfi Tigers
7	MF	Umar Abubakar	15 February 2006 (age 20)	1	0	(Nigeria Football Federation) Devine
10	MF	Ifeoluwa Olowoporoku	15 July 2008 (age 18)	1	0	(Nigeria Football Federation) Triple 44
33	MF	Abbas Rabiu	4 July 2007 (age 19)	0	0	(Nigeria Football Federation) Kano pillars
12	MF	Hope Linus	10 August 2006 (age 20)	3	0	(Nigeria Football Federation) EE Sporting Club
14	MF	Isaac Aondoakaa	28 August 2007 (age 19)	2	0	(Nigeria Football Federation) Bethel Sporting
17	MF	Simon Cletus	10 February 2008 (age 18)	0	0	(Nigeria Football Federation) Mavlon
24	MF	Musa Akinfenwa	4 September 2007 (age 19)	0	0	(Nigeria Football Federation) Real Sapphire
25	MF	Usman Owoyemi	21 August 2006 (age 20)	3	0	(Nigeria Football Federation) Triple 44
26	MF	Matthew Kingsley	26 November 2006 (age 19)	0	0	(The Football Association) Brooke House College
8	FW	Abubakar Abdullahi	27 January 2006 (age 20)	3	1	(Nigeria Football Federation) Jega United
9	FW	Precious Williams	2 October 2006 (age 20)	3	0	(Nigeria Football Federation) HB Abuja
11	FW	Charles Agada	3 September 2006 (age 20)	3	1	(Nigeria Football Federation) Mavlon
13	FW	Jubril Azeez	8 September 2006 (age 20)	0	0	(Nigeria Football Federation) Right Vision
18	FW	Simeon Ogbadibo	20 June 2007 (age 19)	3	0	(Nigeria Football Federation) Jossy United
19	FW	Light Eke	14 April 2006 (age 20)	3	1	(Nigeria Football Federation) C & C
20	FW	Favour Daniel	12 March 2006 (age 20)	2	1	(Nigeria Football Federation) G12

== Notable former players ==
- Macauley Chrisantus
- Lukman Haruna
- Mikel John Obi
- Chinedu Obasi
- Isaac Promise
- Philip Osondu
- Celestine Babayaro
- Mohammed Aliyu
- Benedict Akwuegbu
- Femi Opabunmi
- Sani Emmanuel
- Terry Envoh
- James Obiorah
- Stanley Okoro
- Wilson Oruma
- Ogenyi Onazi
- Kenneth Omeruo
- Ramon Azeez
- Isaac Success
- Francis Uzoho
- Nwankwo Kanu
- Nduka Ugbade
- Jonathan Akpoborie
- Victor Ikpeba
- Kelechi Iheanacho
- Samuel Chukwueze
- Dele Alampasu
- Victor Osimhen
- Kelechi Nwakali
- Samson Tijani

== Head-to-head record ==
The following table shows Nigeria's head-to-head record in the FIFA U-17 World Cup.

Opponent	Pld	W	D	L	GF	GA	GD	Win %
Argentina	5	3	1	1	8	2	+6	60.00
Australia	7	6	0	1	19	4	+15	85.71
Bolivia	1	1	0	0	3	2	+1	100.00
Brazil	1	1	0	0	3	0	+3	100.00
Burkina Faso	1	1	0	0	1	0	+1	100.00
Canada	2	2	0	0	12	0	+12	100.00
China	1	1	0	0	3	0	+3	100.00
Chile	1	1	0	0	5	1	+4	100.00
Colombia	1	1	0	0	2	1	+1	100.00
Costa Rica	2	1	1	0	4	1	+3	50.00
Croatia	1	0	0	1	1	2	−1	0.00
Ecuador	1	1	0	0	3	2	+1	100.00
France	3	2	0	1	4	5	−1	66.67
Germany	3	2	1	0	8	4	+4	66.67
Ghana	1	1	0	0	2	1	+1	100.00
Guinea	1	0	1	0	1	1	+0	0.00
Haiti	1	1	0	0	4	1	+3	100.00
Honduras	1	1	0	0	1	0	+1	100.00
Hungary	2	2	0	0	7	3	+4	100.00
Iran	1	1	0	0	4	1	+3	100.00
Iraq	1	1	0	0	5	0	+5	100.00
Italy	2	2	0	0	2	0	+2	100.00
Japan	3	3	0	0	9	1	+8	100.00
Mali	1	1	0	0	2	0	+2	100.00
Mexico	4	3	0	1	13	4	+9	75.00
Netherlands	1	0	0	1	1	3	−2	0.00
New Zealand	1	1	0	0	5	0	+5	100.00
Oman	1	0	0	1	1	2	−1	0.00
Poland	1	1	0	0	2	1	+1	100.00
Qatar	1	0	1	0	1	1	+0	0.00
Saudi Arabia	2	0	2	0	0	0	+0	0.00
South Korea	1	1	0	0	3	1	+2	100.00
Soviet Union	2	0	2	0	2	2	+0	0.00
Spain	3	2	1	0	5	2	+3	66.67
Sweden	2	1	1	0	6	3	+3	50.00
Switzerland	1	0	0	1	0	1	−1	0.00
United States	2	2	0	0	4	0	+4	100.00
Uruguay	1	1	0	0	2	0	+2	100.00
Total	67	48	11	8	158	52	+106	71.64

== See also ==
- Super Eagles (Nigeria national football team)
- Flying Eagles (Nigeria national under-20 football team)
- African U-17 Championship
