= 2011 FIFA U-20 World Cup squads =

FIFA championship roster

As per FIFA regulations, The final team list of the 21 players (with of at least three are goalkeepers) selected to participate in the competition should notify the FIFA general secretariat, at least ten working days (19 July) before the opening match of the final competition.

Those marked in bold have been capped at full international level.

== Group A ==
=== Colombia ===
Head coach: (Colombia) Eduardo Lara

No.	Pos.	Player	Date of birth (age)	Caps	Goals	Club
1	GK	Cristian Bonilla	20 June 1993 (aged 18)	0	0	(Colombian Football Federation) Boyacá Chicó
2	DF	Luciano Ospina	18 February 1991 (aged 20)	3	0	(Argentine Football Association) Huracán
3	DF	**Pedro Franco** (c)	23 April 1991 (aged 20)	9	1	(Colombian Football Federation) Millonarios
4	DF	**Santiago Arias**	13 January 1992 (aged 19)	9	0	(Portuguese Football Federation) Sporting CP
5	DF	Héctor Quiñones	17 March 1992 (aged 19)	0	0	(Colombian Football Federation) Deportivo Cali
6	MF	**Didier Moreno**	15 September 1991 (aged 19)	7	0	(Colombian Football Federation) Santa Fe
7	FW	**Fabián Castillo**	17 June 1992 (aged 19)	2	0	(United States Soccer Federation) FC Dallas
8	MF	Michael Ortega	6 April 1991 (aged 20)	8	1	(Mexican Football Federation) Atlas
9	FW	**Luis Muriel**	16 April 1991 (aged 20)	0	0	(Italian Football Federation) Udinese
10	MF	**James Rodríguez**	12 July 1991 (aged 20)	0	0	(Portuguese Football Federation) Porto
11	FW	**Duván Zapata**	1 April 1991 (aged 20)	0	0	(Colombian Football Federation) América de Cali
12	GK	**Andrés Mosquera**	10 September 1991 (aged 19)	9	0	(Colombian Football Federation) Bogotá FC
13	MF	Juan David Cabezas	27 February 1991 (aged 20)	6	0	(Colombian Football Federation) Deportivo Cali
14	DF	Juan David Díaz	10 October 1992 (aged 18)	2	0	(Colombian Football Federation) Deportivo Pasto
15	MF	Yerson Candelo	24 February 1992 (aged 19)	0	0	(Colombian Football Federation) Deportivo Cali
16	DF	Jonny Mosquera	17 February 1991 (aged 20)	0	0	(Colombian Football Federation) Envigado
17	MF	Javier Calle	29 April 1991 (aged 20)	7	0	(Colombian Football Federation) Independiente Medellín
18	MF	**Sebastián Pérez**	29 March 1993 (aged 18)	0	0	(Colombian Football Federation) Atlético Nacional
19	DF	**Jeison Murillo**	27 May 1992 (aged 19)	0	0	(Royal Spanish Football Federation) Granada
20	FW	José Adolfo Valencia	18 December 1991 (aged 19)	0	0	(Colombian Football Federation) Santa Fe
21	GK	Juan Sebastián Villate	14 February 1991 (aged 20)	0	0	(Colombian Football Federation) Millonarios

=== France ===
Head coach: (France) Francis Smerecki

No.	Pos.	Player	Date of birth (age)	Caps	Goals	Club
1	GK	Pierrick Cros	23 June 1991 (aged 20)	3	0	(French Football Federation) Sochaux
2	DF	**Loïc Négo**	15 January 1991 (aged 20)	10	0	(French Football Federation) Nantes
3	DF	**Thomas Fontaine**	5 February 1991 (aged 20)	2	0	(French Football Federation) Lyon
4	DF	Florian Lejeune	20 May 1991 (aged 20)	5	1	(French Football Federation) Istres
5	DF	Sébastien Faure	3 January 1991 (aged 20)	7	0	(French Football Federation) Lyon
6	MF	**Clément Grenier**	7 January 1991 (aged 20)	4	2	(French Football Federation) Lyon
7	MF	**Gaël Kakuta**	21 June 1991 (aged 20)	4	0	(The Football Association) Chelsea
8	MF	Gueïda Fofana (c)	16 May 1991 (aged 20)	5	0	(French Football Federation) Le Havre
9	FW	Yannis Tafer	11 February 1991 (aged 20)	10	3	(French Football Federation) Lyon
10	FW	**Gilles Sunu**	30 March 1991 (aged 20)	7	2	(The Football Association) Arsenal
11	MF	**Antoine Griezmann**	21 March 1991 (aged 20)	1	0	(Royal Spanish Football Federation) Real Sociedad
12	DF	**Kalidou Koulibaly**	20 June 1991 (aged 20)	4	0	(French Football Federation) Metz
13	MF	Francis Coquelin	13 May 1991 (aged 20)	5	0	(The Football Association) Arsenal
14	DF	Timothée Kolodziejczak	1 October 1991 (aged 19)	5	0	(French Football Federation) Nice
15	DF	Lionel Carole	12 April 1991 (aged 20)	3	0	(Portuguese Football Federation) Benfica
16	GK	Lucas Veronese	6 February 1991 (aged 20)	0	0	(French Football Federation) Nice
17	FW	**Cédric Bakambu**	11 April 1991 (aged 20)	7	2	(French Football Federation) Sochaux
18	DF	Maxime Colin	15 November 1991 (aged 19)	5	0	(French Football Federation) Boulogne
19	FW	**Alexandre Lacazette**	28 May 1991 (aged 20)	5	4	(French Football Federation) Lyon
20	MF	Enzo Reale	7 October 1991 (aged 19)	7	0	(French Football Federation) Lyon
21	GK	Jonathan Ligali	28 May 1991 (aged 20)	2	0	(French Football Federation) Montpellier

=== Mali ===
Head coach: (Mali) Cheick Fantamady Diallo

No.	Pos.	Player	Date of birth (age)	Caps	Goals	Club
1	GK	Cheick Sy	11 September 1992 (aged 18)			(Malian Football Federation) Djoliba AC
2	MF	Amara Mallé	12 May 1992 (aged 19)			(Malian Football Federation) AS Bamako
3	DF	Amara Konaté	22 March 1992 (aged 19)			(Malian Football Federation) AS Bamako
4	DF	**Boubacar Sylla**	17 April 1991 (aged 20)			(French Football Federation) LB Châteauroux
5	DF	**Moussa Coulibaly**	19 December 1992 (aged 18)			(Malian Football Federation) Stade Malien
6	FW	**Mohamed Konaté**	20 October 1992 (aged 18)			(Malian Football Federation) Djoliba AC
7	MF	Fantamady Diarra	2 November 1992 (aged 18)			(Malian Football Federation) Stade Malien
8	FW	**Cheick Chérif Doumbia**	19 August 1991 (aged 19)			(Tunisian Football Federation) Stade Tunisien
9	MF	**Kalifa Coulibaly**	21 August 1991 (aged 19)			(French Football Federation) Paris Saint-Germain
10	MF	Adama Touré	28 August 1991 (aged 19)			(French Football Federation) Paris Saint-Germain
11	DF	Bakary Dembélé	21 April 1992 (aged 19)			(Malian Football Federation) Stade Malien
12	MF	**Soumaila Sidibe**	15 June 1992 (aged 19)			(Malian Football Federation) Olympique Bamako
13	MF	Kader Coulibaly	20 December 1991 (aged 19)			(Malian Football Federation) AS Real Bamako
14	FW	Seydou Diallo	17 February 1992 (aged 19)			(Malian Football Federation) Djoliba AC
15	DF	Mohamed Traoré	24 March 1992 (aged 19)			(Malian Football Federation) Olympique Bamako
16	GK	Boubacar Togola	11 May 1992 (aged 19)			(Malian Football Federation) Stade Malien
17	DF	Kalil Diakité	27 December 1992 (aged 18)			(Malian Football Federation) AS Korofina
18	MF	Moussa Guindo	15 January 1991 (aged 20)			(Malian Football Federation) Onze Créateurs
19	MF	Ibrahima Diallo	2 December 1991 (aged 19)			(French Football Federation) AJ Auxerre
20	FW	Eric Koné	12 July 1993 (aged 18)			(Ivorian Football Federation) Stella Club
21	DF	Kalifa Traoré	16 February 1991 (aged 20)			(French Football Federation) Paris Saint-Germain

=== South Korea ===
Head coach: (South Korea) Lee Kwang-jong

No.	Pos.	Player	Date of birth (age)	Caps	Goals	Club
1	GK	No Dong-geon	4 October 1991 (aged 19)	12	0	(Korea Football Association) Korea University
2	DF	**Rim Chang-woo**	13 February 1992 (aged 19)	3	0	(Korea Football Association) Ulsan Hyundai
3	DF	**Kim Jin-su**	13 June 1992 (aged 19)	3	0	(Korea Football Association) Kyung Hee University
4	DF	Lee Joo-young	16 March 1991 (aged 20)	3	0	(Korea Football Association) Sungkyunkwan University
5	DF	Hwang Do-yeon	27 February 1991 (aged 20)	11	1	(Korea Football Association) Chunnam Dragons
6	MF	Choi Sung-keun	28 July 1991 (aged 20)	18	0	(Korea Football Association) Korea University
7	MF	Kim Sun-min	12 December 1991 (aged 19)	?	?	(Japan Football Association) Gainare Tottori
8	FW	**Baek Sung-dong**	13 August 1991 (aged 19)	16	1	(Korea Football Association) Yonsei University
9	FW	**Lee Yong-jae**	8 June 1991 (aged 20)	0	0	(French Football Federation) Nantes
10	FW	Jung Seung-yong	25 March 1991 (aged 20)	9	2	(Korea Football Association) Gyeongnam FC
11	MF	Kim Kyung-jung	16 April 1991 (aged 20)	17	2	(Korea Football Association) Korea University
12	DF	Min Sang-gi	27 August 1991 (aged 19)	1	0	(Korea Football Association) Suwon Samsung Bluewings
13	MF	Lee Ki-je	9 July 1991 (aged 20)	10	2	(Korea Football Association) Dongguk University
14	MF	Kim Young-uk	29 April 1991 (aged 20)	22	0	(Korea Football Association) Chunnam Dragons
15	FW	Nam Seung-woo	18 February 1992 (aged 19)	9	1	(Korea Football Association) Yonsei University
16	MF	**Yun Il-lok**	7 March 1992 (aged 19)	11	0	(Korea Football Association) Gyeongnam FC
17	MF	Moon Sang-yun	9 January 1991 (aged 20)	0	0	(Korea Football Association) Ajou University
18	GK	Yang Han-been	30 August 1991 (aged 19)	0	0	(Korea Football Association) Gangwon FC
19	FW	**Lee Jong-ho**	24 February 1992 (aged 19)	11	2	(Korea Football Association) Chunnam Dragons
20	DF	**Jang Hyun-soo**	28 September 1991 (aged 19)	21	3	(Korea Football Association) Yonsei University
21	GK	Kim Jin-young	2 March 1992 (aged 19)	0	0	(Korea Football Association) Konkuk University

== Group B ==
=== Cameroon ===
Head coach: (Cameroon) Martin Ndtoungou

No.	Pos.	Player	Date of birth (age)	Caps	Goals	Club
1	GK	Thierry Tangouatio	4 May 1992 (aged 19)			(Cameroonian Football Federation) Sable de Batié
2	DF	Eric Nyatchou	3 June 1991 (aged 20)			(French Football Federation) Strasbourg
3	DF	**Ambroise Oyongo**	22 June 1991 (aged 20)			(Cameroonian Football Federation) Cotonsport FC
4	DF	**Banana Yaya**	29 July 1991 (aged 20)			(Tunisian Football Federation) Espérance de Tunis
5	DF	Ghislain Mvom	23 October 1992 (aged 18)			(Cameroonian Football Federation) Les Astres FC
6	DF	Idriss Nguessi	2 May 1992 (aged 19)			(Cameroonian Football Federation) Etoa Meki FC
7	MF	**Edgar Salli**	17 August 1992 (aged 18)			(Cameroonian Football Federation) Cotonsport FC
8	MF	Emmanuel Mbongo	13 March 1993 (aged 18)			(Cameroonian Football Federation) Cotonsport FC
9	FW	Franck Ohandza	28 September 1991 (aged 19)			(Football Association of Thailand) Buriram PEA F.C.
10	MF	**Clarence Bitang**	2 September 1992 (aged 18)			(Football Association of Thailand) Buriram PEA F.C.
11	FW	Yannick Makota	20 January 1992 (aged 19)			(French Football Federation) Nancy
12	MF	**Franck Kom**	18 September 1991 (aged 19)			(Cameroonian Football Federation) Panthère FC
13	DF	**Serge Leuko**	4 August 1993 (aged 17)			(Royal Spanish Football Federation) Torre Levante
14	MF	**Yazid Atouba**	2 January 1993 (aged 18)			(Cameroonian Football Federation) Canon Yaoundé
15	DF	Maxime Mengue	17 November 1991 (aged 19)			(Cameroonian Football Federation) Canon Yaoundé
16	GK	Jean Efala	11 August 1992 (aged 18)			(Cameroonian Football Federation) Fovu
17	DF	Jushua Mbuluba	15 January 1992 (aged 19)			(Cameroonian Football Federation) Renaissance FC de Ngoumou
18	MF	Hervé Mbega	5 January 1994 (aged 17)			(Royal Spanish Football Federation) Mallorca B
19	FW	Christ Mbondi	2 February 1992 (aged 19)			(Swiss Football Association) Sion
20	FW	Eric Same	23 February 1993 (aged 18)			(Royal Spanish Football Federation) Huracán Valencia
21	GK	Eric Ngana	3 October 1992 (aged 18)			(Cameroonian Football Federation) Renaissance FC de Ngoumou

=== New Zealand ===
Head coach: (New Zealand) Chris Milicich

No.	Pos.	Player	Date of birth (age)	Caps	Goals	Club
1	GK	**Stefan Marinovic**	10 July 1991 (aged 20)	7	0	(German Football Association) Wehen Wiesbaden
2	DF	Andrew Bevin	16 May 1992 (aged 19)	6	3	(New Zealand Football) Napier City Rovers
3	DF	Nick Branch	28 January 1991 (aged 20)	7	4	(New Zealand Football) Central United
4	DF	Ryan Cain	7 December 1992 (aged 18)	6	1	(New Zealand Football) Western Suburbs FC
5	FW	Sean Lovemore	8 June 1992 (aged 19)	3	0	(New Zealand Football) Onehunga Sports
6	DF	**Nikko Boxall**	24 February 1992 (aged 19)	4	0	(New Zealand Football) Central United
7	MF	**Cameron Lindsay**	21 December 1992 (aged 18)	2	1	(The Football Association) Blackburn Rovers
8	FW	Ethan Galbraith	25 August 1991 (aged 19)	4	1	(New Zealand Football) Lower Hutt City
9	FW	**Tim Payne**	10 January 1994 (aged 17)	0	0	(New Zealand Football) Waitakere United
10	DF	Anthony Hobbs	6 April 1991 (aged 20)	7	0	(New Zealand Football) Waitakere United
11	FW	Dakota Lucas	26 July 1991 (aged 20)	7	5	(New Zealand Football) Waitakere United
12	FW	Andrew Milne	1 March 1992 (aged 19)	4	0	(New Zealand Football) Auckland City FC
13	MF	Colin Murphy	19 March 1991 (aged 20)	3	0	(New Zealand Football) Onehunga Sports
14	DF	**James Musa**	1 April 1992 (aged 19)	7	3	Unattached
15	MF	**Marco Rojas**	5 November 1991 (aged 19)	7	4	(Football Australia) Melbourne Victory
16	DF	**Luke Rowe**	16 September 1992 (aged 18)	3	0	(The Football Association) Birmingham City
17	FW	Mikey Kramer	12 July 1991 (aged 20)	0	0	(New Zealand Football) Melville United
18	GK	Scott Basalaj	19 April 1994 (aged 17)	0	0	(New Zealand Football) Lower Hutt City
19	DF	Liam Higgins	27 September 1993 (aged 17)	0	0	(New Zealand Football) Lower Hutt City
20	MF	Adam Thomas	1 April 1992 (aged 19)	5	1	(New Zealand Football) Melville United
21	GK	Coey Turipa	12 February 1992 (aged 19)	0	0	(Football Australia) Brisbane Wolves

=== Portugal ===
Head coach: (Portugal) Ilídio Vale

No.	Pos.	Player	Date of birth (age)	Caps	Goals	Club
1	GK	Mika	8 March 1991 (aged 20)	10	0	(Portuguese Football Federation) União de Leiria
2	MF	**Pelé**	29 September 1991 (aged 19)	12	1	(Portuguese Football Federation) Belenenses
3	DF	Tiago Ferreira	10 July 1993 (aged 18)	2	0	(Portuguese Football Federation) Porto
4	DF	Nuno Reis (c)	31 January 1991 (aged 20)	12	0	(Royal Belgian Football Association) Cercle Brugge
5	DF	Roderick Miranda	30 March 1991 (aged 20)	8	0	(Portuguese Football Federation) Benfica
6	MF	Júlio Alves	26 June 1991 (aged 20)	10	0	(Portuguese Football Federation) Rio Ave
7	FW	**Nélson Oliveira**	8 August 1991 (aged 19)	12	5	(Portuguese Football Federation) Paços de Ferreira
8	DF	**Cédric Soares**	31 August 1991 (aged 19)	11	0	(Portuguese Football Federation) Sporting CP
9	FW	**Amido Baldé**	16 May 1991 (aged 20)	9	2	(Royal Spanish Football Federation) Badajoz
10	MF	**Lassana Camará**	29 December 1991 (aged 19)	10	0	(Swiss Football Association) Servette
11	FW	Rui Caetano	20 April 1991 (aged 20)	10	0	(Portuguese Football Federation) Paços de Ferreira
12	GK	Tiago Maia	18 September 1992 (aged 18)	1	0	(Portuguese Football Federation) Porto
13	DF	Luís Martins	10 June 1992 (aged 19)	5	1	(Portuguese Football Federation) Benfica
14	FW	Alex	27 August 1991 (aged 19)	11	1	(Portuguese Football Federation) Santa Clara
15	MF	**Danilo Pereira**	9 September 1991 (aged 19)	12	2	(Hellenic Football Federation) Aris
16	DF	Serginho	21 February 1991 (aged 20)	6	0	(Portuguese Football Federation) Trofense
17	MF	**Sérgio Oliveira**	2 June 1992 (aged 19)	11	1	(Portuguese Football Federation) Beira-Mar
18	MF	Ricardo Dias	25 February 1991 (aged 20)	6	0	(Portuguese Football Federation) Beira-Mar
19	GK	Luís Ribeiro	19 April 1992 (aged 19)	1	0	(Portuguese Football Federation) Sporting CP
20	DF	**Mário Rui**	27 May 1991 (aged 20)	12	0	(Portuguese Football Federation) Fátima
21	FW	Rafael Lopes	28 July 1991 (aged 20)	7	1	(Portuguese Football Federation) Varzim

=== Uruguay ===
Head coach: (Uruguay) Juan Verzeri

No.	Pos.	Player	Date of birth (age)	Caps	Goals	Club
1	GK	Salvador Ichazo	26 January 1992 (aged 19)			(Uruguayan Football Association) Danubio
2	DF	Federico Platero	2 July 1991 (aged 20)			(Uruguayan Football Association) Defensor Sporting
3	DF	Diego Polenta	2 June 1992 (aged 19)			(Italian Football Federation) Genoa
4	DF	Guillermo de los Santos	15 February 1991 (aged 20)			(Uruguayan Football Association) Cerro
5	MF	Angel Cayetano	1 August 1991 (aged 19)			(Uruguayan Football Association) Danubio
6	DF	Leandro Cabrera	17 June 1991 (aged 20)			(Royal Spanish Football Federation) Numancia
7	FW	Adrián Luna	12 April 1992 (aged 19)			(Royal Spanish Football Federation) Espanyol
8	MF	**Matías Vecino**	24 August 1991 (aged 19)			(Uruguayan Football Association) Nacional
9	FW	Federico Rodríguez	3 April 1991 (aged 20)			(Italian Football Federation) Bologna
10	MF	Pablo Ceppelini	11 September 1991 (aged 19)			(Italian Football Federation) Cagliari
11	FW	David Texeira	27 February 1991 (aged 20)			(Uruguayan Football Association) Defensor Sporting
12	GK	Leandro Gelpi	27 February 1991 (aged 20)			(Uruguayan Football Association) Peñarol
13	DF	Maximiliano Olivera	5 March 1992 (aged 19)			(Uruguayan Football Association) Montevideo Wanderers
14	DF	Ramón Arias	27 July 1992 (aged 19)			(Uruguayan Football Association) Defensor Sporting
15	MF	Santiago Martínez	30 July 1991 (aged 19)			(Uruguayan Football Association) Montevideo Wanderers
16	MF	Nicolás Prieto	5 September 1992 (aged 18)			(Uruguayan Football Association) Nacional
17	DF	Yefferson Moreira	7 March 1991 (aged 20)			(Uruguayan Football Association) Peñarol
18	MF	**Camilo Mayada**	8 January 1991 (aged 20)			(Uruguayan Football Association) Danubio
19	FW	**Diego Rolán**	24 March 1993 (aged 18)			(Uruguayan Football Association) Defensor Sporting
20	FW	Ignacio Lores	26 April 1991 (aged 20)			(Uruguayan Football Association) Defensor Sporting
21	GK	Jhonny da Silva	21 August 1991 (aged 19)			(Uruguayan Football Association) Tacuarembó

== Group C ==
=== Australia ===
Head coach: (Netherlands) Jan Versleijen

No.	Pos.	Player	Date of birth (age)	Caps	Goals	Club
1	GK	**Mark Birighitti**	17 April 1991 (aged 20)	29	0	(Football Australia) Adelaide United
2	MF	**Rhyan Grant**	26 February 1991 (aged 20)	19	0	(Football Australia) Sydney FC
3	DF	**Dylan McGowan**	6 July 1991 (aged 19)	21	4	(Football Australia) Gold Coast United
4	DF	**Trent Sainsbury**	5 January 1992 (aged 19)	5	0	(Football Australia) Central Coast Mariners
5	DF	Marc Warren	11 February 1992 (aged 19)	9	0	(The Football Association) Sheffield United
6	MF	Ben Kantarovski (c)	20 January 1992 (aged 19)	22	2	(Football Australia) Newcastle Jets
7	FW	Kofi Danning	3 February 1991 (aged 20)	26	3	(Football Australia) Brisbane Roar
8	MF	**Terry Antonis**	26 November 1993 (aged 17)	6	1	(Football Australia) Sydney FC
9	FW	Kerem Bulut	3 February 1992 (aged 19)	11	9	(Football Association of the Czech Republic) Mladá Boleslav
10	MF	**Mustafa Amini**	20 April 1993 (aged 18)	13	3	(Football Australia) Central Coast Mariners
11	FW	**Tommy Oar**	10 December 1991 (aged 19)	29	2	(Royal Dutch Football Association) Utrecht
12	GK	Nick Feely	1 January 1992 (aged 19)	0	0	(Scottish Football Association) Celtic
13	FW	Matthew Fletcher	1 June 1992 (aged 19)	11	2	Unattached
14	FW	Corey Gameiro	7 February 1993 (aged 18)	1	0	(The Football Association) Fulham
15	DF	Brendan Hamill	18 September 1992 (aged 18)	11	1	(Football Australia) Melbourne Heart
16	DF	Petar Franjic	7 April 1992 (aged 19)	9	1	(Football Australia) Melbourne Victory
17	DF	Sam Gallagher	5 May 1991 (aged 20)	16	1	(Football Australia) Central Coast Mariners
18	GK	Matt Acton	3 June 1992 (aged 19)	2	0	(Football Australia) Brisbane Roar
19	FW	**Bernie Ibini-Isei**	12 September 1992 (aged 18)	2	1	(Football Australia) Central Coast Mariners
20	MF	Jake Barker-Daish	7 May 1993 (aged 18)	2	0	(Football Australia) Gold Coast United
21	FW	**Dimitri Petratos**	10 November 1992 (aged 18)	6	2	(Football Australia) Sydney FC

- Nick Feely replaced Lawrence Thomas on 22 July due to a thigh injury.
- Mathew Leckie was withdrawn by his club side Borussia Mönchengladbach on 23 July 2011 and replaced by Corey Gameiro.

=== Costa Rica ===
Head coach: (Costa Rica) Rónald González

No.	Pos.	Player	Date of birth (age)	Caps	Goals	Club
1	GK	Mauricio Vargas	10 August 1992 (aged 18)			(Royal Spanish Football Federation) Albacete Balompié
2	DF	**Jordan Smith**	23 April 1991 (aged 20)			(French Football Federation) Le Havre
3	DF	**Keyner Brown**	30 December 1991 (aged 19)			(Costa Rican Football Federation) Orión
4	DF	Ariel Contreras	5 October 1991 (aged 19)			(Costa Rican Football Federation) Saprissa
5	MF	Rafael Chávez	15 January 1991 (aged 20)			(Costa Rican Football Federation) Saprissa
6	FW	**John Jairo Ruiz**	10 January 1994 (aged 17)			(Costa Rican Football Federation) Saprissa
7	FW	Mynor Escoe	6 April 1991 (aged 20)			(French Football Federation) Lorient
8	MF	**Juan Bustos**	9 July 1992 (aged 19)			(Costa Rican Football Federation) Saprissa
9	FW	Joshua Díaz	14 February 1991 (aged 20)			(Costa Rican Football Federation) Puntarenas
10	FW	**Joel Campbell**	26 June 1992 (aged 19)			(Costa Rican Football Federation) Saprissa
11	FW	Bryan Vega	27 May 1991 (aged 20)			(Costa Rican Football Federation) Orión
12	MF	**Diego Calvo**	25 March 1991 (aged 20)			(Costa Rican Football Federation) Alajuelense
13	GK	**Kevin Briceño**	21 October 1991 (aged 19)			(Costa Rican Football Federation) Orión
14	FW	Vianney Blanco	1 September 1992 (aged 18)			(Costa Rican Football Federation) Alajuelense
15	DF	**Joseph Mora**	15 January 1993 (aged 18)			(Costa Rican Football Federation) Alajuelense
16	DF	**Ariel Soto**	14 May 1992 (aged 19)			(Costa Rican Football Federation) Orión
17	MF	**Yeltsin Tejeda**	17 March 1992 (aged 19)			(Costa Rican Football Federation) Saprissa
18	GK	Aaron Cruz	25 May 1991 (aged 20)			(Costa Rican Football Federation) San Carlos
19	FW	**Deyver Vega**	19 September 1992 (aged 18)			(Costa Rican Football Federation) Saprissa
20	DF	**Francisco Calvo**	8 July 1992 (aged 19)			Unattached
21	FW	Pablo Martínez	14 January 1992 (aged 19)			(Costa Rican Football Federation) Alajuelense

=== Ecuador ===
Head coach: (Ecuador) Sixto Vizuete

No.	Pos.	Player	Date of birth (age)	Caps	Goals	Club
1	GK	John Jaramillo	15 September 1991 (aged 19)	0	0	(Ecuadorian Football Federation) LDU Quito
2	DF	**Mario Pineida**	6 July 1992 (aged 19)	0	0	(Ecuadorian Football Federation) Independiente del Valle
3	DF	**John Narváez**	12 June 1991 (aged 20)	0	0	(Ecuadorian Football Federation) Deportivo Cuenca
4	DF	Wilson Morante	12 February 1991 (aged 20)	0	0	(Ecuadorian Football Federation) Emelec
5	MF	**Dennys Quiñónez**	12 March 1992 (aged 19)	20	0	(Ecuadorian Football Federation) Barcelona
6	DF	Edder Fuertes	27 March 1992 (aged 19)	0	0	(Ecuadorian Football Federation) El Nacional
7	MF	**Fernando Gaibor**	8 October 1991 (aged 19)	0	0	(Ecuadorian Football Federation) Emelec
8	MF	Yeison Ordóñez	15 March 1992 (aged 19)	0	0	(Ecuadorian Football Federation) Independiente del Valle
9	FW	**Marlon de Jesús**	4 September 1991 (aged 19)	4	0	(Ecuadorian Football Federation) Deportivo Quito
10	FW	**Juan Govea**	27 January 1991 (aged 20)	0	0	(Ecuadorian Football Federation) Deportivo Cuenca
11	MF	**Marcos Caicedo**	10 November 1991 (aged 19)	0	0	(Ecuadorian Football Federation) Emelec
12	GK	Johan Padilla	14 August 1992 (aged 18)	0	0	(Ecuadorian Football Federation) Independiente del Valle
13	FW	**Edson Montaño**	15 March 1991 (aged 20)	0	0	(Royal Belgian Football Association) Gent
14	MF	**Dixon Arroyo**	1 June 1992 (aged 19)	0	0	(Ecuadorian Football Federation) Deportivo Quito
15	MF	**Juan Cazares**	3 April 1992 (aged 19)	0	0	(Argentine Football Association) River Plate
16	DF	**Christian Cruz**	1 August 1992 (aged 18)	0	0	(Ecuadorian Football Federation) Barcelona
17	FW	Jorge Cuesta	25 February 1992 (aged 19)	0	0	(Ecuadorian Football Federation) Deportivo Cuenca
18	MF	Danny Luna	25 May 1991 (aged 20)	0	0	(Ecuadorian Football Federation) Rocafuerte
19	MF	**Brayan de la Torre**	11 January 1991 (aged 20)	0	0	(Ecuadorian Football Federation) Barcelona
20	MF	Andrés Oña	30 October 1992 (aged 18)	0	0	(Ecuadorian Football Federation) Independiente del Valle
21	GK	Fredy Carcelén	4 September 1993 (aged 17)	0	0	(Ecuadorian Football Federation) El Nacional

=== Spain ===
Head coach: (Spain) Julen Lopetegui

No.	Pos.	Player	Date of birth (age)	Caps	Goals	Club
1	GK	Álex Sánchez	3 February 1991 (aged 20)	1	0	(Royal Spanish Football Federation) Zaragoza
2	DF	Hugo Mallo	22 June 1991 (aged 20)	0	0	(Royal Spanish Football Federation) Celta Vigo
3	DF	Antonio Luna	17 March 1991 (aged 20)	1	0	(Royal Spanish Football Federation) Sevilla
4	DF	**Marc Bartra** (c)	15 January 1991 (aged 20)	1	0	(Royal Spanish Football Federation) Barcelona
5	DF	Jorge Pulido	8 April 1991 (aged 20)	1	0	(Royal Spanish Football Federation) Atlético Madrid
6	MF	Oriol Romeu	24 September 1991 (aged 19)	3	0	(Royal Spanish Football Federation) Barcelona
7	MF	Kiko Femenía	2 February 1991 (aged 20)	1	0	(Royal Spanish Football Federation) Barcelona
8	MF	Recio	11 January 1991 (aged 20)	1	0	(Royal Spanish Football Federation) Málaga
9	FW	**Rodrigo**	6 March 1991 (aged 20)	1	0	(Portuguese Football Federation) Benfica
10	MF	**Sergio Canales**	16 February 1991 (aged 20)	0	0	(Royal Spanish Football Federation) Real Madrid
11	FW	Dani Pacheco	5 January 1991 (aged 20)	0	0	(The Football Association) Liverpool
12	DF	Carles Planas	4 March 1991 (aged 20)	0	0	(Royal Spanish Football Federation) Barcelona
13	GK	Aitor Fernández	3 May 1991 (aged 20)	1	0	(Royal Spanish Football Federation) Athletic Bilbao
14	DF	**Jordi Amat**	21 March 1992 (aged 19)	1	0	(Royal Spanish Football Federation) Espanyol
15	FW	**Isco**	21 April 1992 (aged 19)	1	0	(Royal Spanish Football Federation) Málaga
16	MF	**Koke**	8 January 1992 (aged 19)	0	0	(Royal Spanish Football Federation) Atlético Madrid
17	MF	**Sergi Roberto**	7 February 1992 (aged 19)	1	0	(Royal Spanish Football Federation) Barcelona
18	MF	**Cristian Tello**	11 August 1991 (aged 19)	1	1	(Royal Spanish Football Federation) Barcelona
19	MF	Ezequiel Calvente	12 January 1991 (aged 20)	1	0	(Royal Spanish Football Federation) Betis
20	FW	Álvaro Vázquez	27 April 1991 (aged 20)	1	0	(Royal Spanish Football Federation) Espanyol
21	GK	Fernando Pacheco	18 May 1992 (aged 19)	0	0	(Royal Spanish Football Federation) Real Madrid

== Group D ==
=== Croatia ===
Head coach: (Croatia) Ivica Grnja

No.	Pos.	Player	Date of birth (age)	Caps	Goals	Club
1	GK	Matej Delač	20 August 1992 (aged 18)	1	0	(The Football Association) Chelsea
2	DF	Ivor Horvat	19 August 1991 (aged 19)	1	0	(Croatian Football Federation) Lokomotiva
3	DF	Dejan Glavica	20 August 1991 (aged 19)	1	0	(Croatian Football Federation) Varaždin
4	MF	**Franko Andrijašević**	22 June 1991 (aged 20)	1	0	(Croatian Football Federation) Hajduk Split
5	DF	Renato Kelić	31 March 1991 (aged 20)	0	0	(Football Association of the Czech Republic) Slovan Liberec
6	DF	Tomislav Glumac	14 May 1991 (aged 20)	1	0	(Croatian Football Federation) Hajduk Split
7	MF	Zvonko Pamić	4 February 1991 (aged 20)	0	0	(German Football Association) MSV Duisburg
8	MF	**Arijan Ademi**	29 May 1991 (aged 20)	0	0	(Croatian Football Federation) Dinamo Zagreb
9	FW	**Andrej Kramarić**	19 June 1991 (aged 20)	0	0	(Croatian Football Federation) Dinamo Zagreb
10	MF	**Filip Ozobić**	8 April 1991 (aged 20)	6	0	(Russian Football Union) Spartak Moscow
11	MF	Mario Tičinović	20 August 1991 (aged 19)	4	1	(Croatian Football Federation) Hajduk Split
12	GK	Dominik Picak	12 February 1992 (aged 19)	0	0	(Croatian Football Federation) Dinamo Zagreb
13	DF	**Marko Lešković**	27 April 1991 (aged 20)	1	1	(Croatian Football Federation) Osijek
14	MF	Roberto Punčec	27 October 1991 (aged 19)	0	0	(Croatian Football Federation) Varaždin
15	FW	Antonio Jakoliš	28 February 1992 (aged 19)	0	0	(Croatian Football Federation) Šibenik
16	MF	Frano Mlinar	30 March 1992 (aged 19)	0	0	(Croatian Football Federation) Lokomotiva
17	FW	Anton Maglica	11 November 1991 (aged 19)	0	0	(Croatian Football Federation) Osijek
18	FW	Ivan Lendrić	8 August 1991 (aged 19)	0	0	(Croatian Football Federation) Hajduk Split
19	FW	Marin Zulim	26 October 1991 (aged 19)	0	0	(Croatian Football Federation) Hajduk Split
20	FW	Ivan Blažević	25 July 1992 (aged 19)	0	0	(Croatian Football Federation) Inter Zaprešić
21	GK	Michael Paradžiković	9 January 1992 (aged 19)	0	0	(Croatian Football Federation) Cibalia

=== Guatemala ===
Head coach: (Paraguay) Ever Hugo Almeida

No.	Pos.	Player	Date of birth (age)	Caps	Goals	Club
1	GK	Roberto Padilla	9 July 1993 (aged 18)			(National Football Federation of Guatemala) Comunicaciones
2	DF	José Andrade	11 April 1991 (aged 20)			(National Football Federation of Guatemala) Cobán Imperial
3	DF	Manuel Moreno	18 June 1991 (aged 20)			(National Football Federation of Guatemala) Juventud Retalteca
4	DF	William Ramírez	21 April 1991 (aged 20)			(National Football Federation of Guatemala) Nueva Concepción
5	DF	**Elías Vásquez** (c)	18 June 1992 (aged 19)			(National Football Federation of Guatemala) Comunicaciones
6	MF	**José Del Águila**	7 March 1991 (aged 20)			(National Football Federation of Guatemala) Comunicaciones
7	MF	**Marvin Ceballos**	22 April 1992 (aged 19)			(National Football Federation of Guatemala) Comunicaciones
8	MF	**José Carlos Castillo**	18 February 1992 (aged 19)			(United States Soccer Federation) VCU Rams
9	FW	**Henry López**	8 August 1992 (aged 18)			(Brazilian Football Confederation) Esporte Clube Noroeste
10	MF	Kevin Norales	26 January 1991 (aged 20)			(National Football Federation of Guatemala) Deportivo Marquense
11	MF	**Kendel Herrarte**	6 April 1992 (aged 19)			(National Football Federation of Guatemala) Comunicaciones
12	GK	José Carlos Morales	14 February 1991 (aged 20)			(National Football Federation of Guatemala) La Gomera
13	FW	José Eduardo Melgar	12 January 1991 (aged 20)			(National Football Federation of Guatemala) Juventud Escuintleca
14	DF	José Lémus	5 December 1992 (aged 18)			(National Football Federation of Guatemala) Comunicaciones
15	DF	**Sixto Betancourt**	16 May 1992 (aged 19)			(National Football Federation of Guatemala) Deportivo Marquense
16	MF	Cristian Lima	2 October 1992 (aged 18)			(National Football Federation of Guatemala) Jalapa
17	MF	Marco Rivas	2 April 1991 (aged 20)			(National Football Federation of Guatemala) Municipal
18	FW	Abner Bonilla	5 October 1991 (aged 19)			(National Football Federation of Guatemala) Juventud Escuintleca
19	DF	Walter Arriola	20 October 1992 (aged 18)			(National Football Federation of Guatemala) Deportivo Cahabón
20	FW	Gerson Lima	10 November 1992 (aged 18)			(National Football Federation of Guatemala) Jalapa
21	GK	José Carlos García	16 February 1993 (aged 18)			(National Football Federation of Guatemala) Nueva Concepción

=== Nigeria ===
Head coach: (Nigeria) John Obuh

No.	Pos.	Player	Date of birth (age)	Caps	Goals	Club
1	GK	Dami Paul	18 December 1992 (aged 18)			(Nigeria Football Federation) Nasarawa United F.C.
2	DF	**Terna Suswam**	5 September 1991 (aged 19)			(Portuguese Football Federation) Vitória de Setúbal
3	MF	Omoh Ojabu	14 December 1992 (aged 18)			(Nigeria Football Federation) Dolphins
4	MF	Sani Tahir	25 August 1992 (aged 18)			(Danish Football Association) Vejle
5	DF	**Kenneth Omeruo**	17 October 1993 (aged 17)			(Royal Belgian Football Association) Standard Liège
6	DF	Ganiu Ogungbe	12 September 1992 (aged 18)			(Nigeria Football Federation) Gateway
7	FW	**Ahmed Musa**	14 October 1992 (aged 18)			(Royal Dutch Football Association) VVV-Venlo
8	FW	Maduabuchi Ejike	1 January 1993 (aged 18)			(Nigeria Football Federation) Sharks
9	FW	**Olarenwaju Kayode**	8 May 1993 (aged 18)			(Ivorian Football Federation) ASEC Mimosas
10	MF	Abdul Jeleel Ajagun	10 February 1993 (aged 18)			(Nigeria Football Federation) Dolphins
11	FW	Terry Envoh	12 December 1992 (aged 18)			(Nigeria Football Federation) Sharks
12	FW	**Uche Nwofor**	17 September 1991 (aged 19)			(Nigeria Football Federation) Enugu Rangers
13	DF	**Emmanuel Anyanwu**	15 November 1991 (aged 19)			(Nigeria Football Federation) Enyimba Aba
14	FW	Sani Emmanuel	23 December 1992 (aged 18)			(Italian Football Federation) Lazio
15	MF	Philemon Daniel	20 November 1992 (aged 18)			(Nigeria Football Federation) Kwara United F.C.
16	GK	Gideon Gambo	15 November 1992 (aged 18)			(Nigeria Football Federation) Sharks
17	DF	Felix Udoh	28 December 1993 (aged 17)			(Nigeria Football Federation) First Bank
18	FW	Edafe Egbedi	5 August 1993 (aged 17)			Unattached
19	DF	Chimezie Mbah	10 November 1992 (aged 18)			(Nigeria Football Federation) Warri Wolves
20	MF	**Ramon Azeez**	12 December 1992 (aged 18)			(Royal Spanish Football Federation) Almería
21	GK	Kazim Yekini	1 December 1992 (aged 18)			(Nigeria Football Federation) Kwara United

=== Saudi Arabia ===
Head coach: (Saudi Arabia) Khalid Al-Koroni

No.	Pos.	Player	Date of birth (age)	Caps	Goals	Club
1	GK	**Abdullah Al-Sudairy**	2 February 1992 (aged 19)			(Saudi Arabian Football Federation) Al-Hilal
2	DF	Saleh Al-Qumaizi	30 October 1991 (aged 19)			(Saudi Arabian Football Federation) Al-Shabab
3	DF	**Salem Al-Dawsari**	19 August 1991 (aged 19)			(Saudi Arabian Football Federation) Al-Hilal
4	DF	**Mohammed Al-Fatil**	4 January 1992 (aged 19)			(Saudi Arabian Football Federation) Al-Ahli
5	DF	Abdullah Al-Hafith	25 December 1992 (aged 18)			(Saudi Arabian Football Federation) Al-Ittifaq
6	DF	**Ali Al-Zubaidi**	4 January 1993 (aged 18)			(Saudi Arabian Football Federation) Al-Ittifaq
7	FW	Yahya Dagriri	13 August 1991 (aged 19)			(Saudi Arabian Football Federation) Al-Ittihad
8	MF	Abdulaziz Al-Aazmi	6 February 1991 (aged 20)			(Saudi Arabian Football Federation) Al Nasr
9	FW	**Fahad Al-Muwallad**	14 September 1994 (aged 16)			(Saudi Arabian Football Federation) Al-Ittihad
10	MF	Abdulellah Al-Nassar	6 July 1991 (aged 20)			(Saudi Arabian Football Federation) Al Nasr
11	MF	**Ibrahim Al-Ibrahim**	3 June 1992 (aged 19)			(Saudi Arabian Football Federation) Al-Ittifaq
12	MF	**Maan Khodari**	13 December 1991 (aged 19)			(Saudi Arabian Football Federation) Al-Ittihad
13	DF	**Yasser Al-Shahrani**	25 May 1992 (aged 19)			(Saudi Arabian Football Federation) Al-Qadisiya
14	MF	**Abdullah Otayf**	3 August 1992 (aged 18)			(Portuguese Football Federation) Louletano
15	MF	**Mustafa Bassas**	2 June 1993 (aged 18)			(Saudi Arabian Football Federation) Al-Ahli
16	GK	**Fawaz Al-Qarni**	2 April 1992 (aged 19)			(Saudi Arabian Football Federation) Al-Ittihad
17	FW	Mohammed Majrashi	20 May 1991 (aged 20)			(Saudi Arabian Football Federation) Al-Ahli
18	DF	**Motaz Hawsawi**	17 February 1992 (aged 19)			(Saudi Arabian Football Federation) Al-Ahli
19	FW	Fahad Al-Johani	26 October 1991 (aged 19)			(Saudi Arabian Football Federation) Al-Hilal
20	MF	Yasser Al-Fahmi	20 December 1991 (aged 19)			(Saudi Arabian Football Federation) Al-Ahli
21	GK	**Fawaz Al-Khaibari**	6 January 1992 (aged 19)			(Saudi Arabian Football Federation) Al-Ittihad

== Group E ==
=== Austria ===
Head coach: (Austria) Andreas Heraf

No.	Pos.	Player	Date of birth (age)	Caps	Goals	Club
1	GK	Samuel Şahin-Radlinger	7 November 1992 (aged 18)	0	0	(German Football Association) Hannover 96
2	DF	Richard Windbichler	2 April 1991 (aged 20)	0	0	(Austrian Football Association) Trenkwalder Admira
3	DF	Emir Dilaver	7 May 1991 (aged 20)	0	0	(Austrian Football Association) Austria Wien
4	DF	Lukas Rotpuller	31 March 1991 (aged 20)	0	0	(Austrian Football Association) Austria Wien
5	DF	Michael Schimpelsberger	12 February 1991 (aged 20)	0	0	(Austrian Football Association) Rapid Wien
6	MF	Tobias Kainz	31 October 1992 (aged 18)	0	0	(Royal Dutch Football Association) Heerenveen
7	MF	Kevin Stöger	27 August 1993 (aged 17)	0	0	(German Football Association) VfB Stuttgart
8	MF	Robert Gucher	20 February 1991 (aged 20)	0	0	(Austrian Football Association) Kapfenberger SV
9	FW	**Andreas Weimann**	5 August 1991 (aged 19)	0	0	(The Football Association) Aston Villa
10	FW	**Marco Djuricin**	12 December 1992 (aged 18)	0	0	(German Football Association) Hertha BSC
11	MF	Daniel Offenbacher	18 February 1992 (aged 19)	0	0	(Austrian Football Association) Red Bull Salzburg
12	GK	Christoph Riegler	30 March 1992 (aged 19)	0	0	(Austrian Football Association) SKN St. Pölten
13	DF	Marcel Ziegl	20 December 1992 (aged 18)	0	0	(Austrian Football Association) SV Ried
14	MF	Patrick Farkas	9 September 1992 (aged 18)	0	0	(Austrian Football Association) SV Bauwelt Koch Mattersburg
15	DF	Lukas Rath	30 March 1992 (aged 19)	0	0	(Austrian Football Association) SV Bauwelt Koch Mattersburg
16	FW	Georg Teigl	9 February 1991 (aged 20)	0	0	(Austrian Football Association) Red Bull Salzburg
17	MF	Marco Meilinger	3 August 1991 (aged 19)	1	0	(Austrian Football Association) Red Bull Salzburg
18	FW	Christian Klem	21 April 1991 (aged 20)	0	0	(Austrian Football Association) Sturm Graz
19	FW	Daniel Schütz	19 June 1991 (aged 20)	0	0	(Austrian Football Association) Wacker Innsbruck
20	FW	Robert Žulj	5 February 1992 (aged 19)	0	0	(Austrian Football Association) SV Ried
21	GK	Philip Petermann	3 August 1991 (aged 19)	0	0	(Austrian Football Association) SC-ESV Parndorf 1919

=== Brazil ===
Head coach: (Brazil) Ney Franco

No.	Pos.	Player	Date of birth (age)	Caps	Goals	Club
1	GK	**Gabriel**	27 September 1992 (aged 18)	8	0	(Brazilian Football Confederation) Cruzeiro
2	DF	**Danilo**	15 July 1991 (aged 20)	8	1	(Brazilian Football Confederation) Santos
3	DF	**Bruno Uvini**	3 June 1991 (aged 20)	6	0	(Brazilian Football Confederation) São Paulo
4	DF	**Juan Jesus**	10 June 1991 (aged 20)	7	0	(Brazilian Football Confederation) Internacional
5	MF	**Fernando**	3 March 1992 (aged 19)	8	0	(Brazilian Football Confederation) Grêmio
6	DF	**Alex Sandro**	26 January 1991 (aged 20)	9	0	(Portuguese Football Federation) Porto
7	MF	**Dudu**	7 January 1992 (aged 19)	0	0	(Brazilian Football Confederation) Cruzeiro
8	MF	**Casemiro**	15 March 1992 (aged 19)	8	3	(Brazilian Football Confederation) São Paulo
9	FW	Willian José	23 November 1991 (aged 19)	8	3	(Brazilian Football Confederation) São Paulo
10	MF	**Philippe Coutinho**	12 June 1992 (aged 19)	0	0	(Italian Football Federation) Inter Milan
11	MF	**Oscar**	9 September 1991 (aged 19)	9	0	(Brazilian Football Confederation) Internacional
12	GK	César	27 January 1992 (aged 19)	0	0	(Brazilian Football Confederation) Flamengo
13	DF	Rodrigo Frauches	28 September 1992 (aged 18)	0	0	(Brazilian Football Confederation) Flamengo
14	MF	**Allan**	8 January 1991 (aged 20)	0	0	(Brazilian Football Confederation) Vasco da Gama
15	DF	Romário Leiria	28 June 1992 (aged 19)	4	0	(Brazilian Football Confederation) Internacional
16	DF	Gabriel Silva	13 May 1991 (aged 20)	2	0	(Brazilian Football Confederation) Palmeiras
17	DF	Rafael Galhardo	30 October 1991 (aged 19)	7	0	(Brazilian Football Confederation) Flamengo
18	MF	Alan Patrick	13 May 1991 (aged 20)	3	0	(Ukrainian Association of Football) Shakhtar Donetsk
19	FW	Henrique	27 May 1991 (aged 20)	6	2	(Brazilian Football Confederation) São Paulo
20	FW	Negueba	7 March 1992 (aged 19)	0	0	(Brazilian Football Confederation) Flamengo
21	GK	Aleks	20 February 1991 (aged 20)	1	0	(Brazilian Football Confederation) Avaí

=== Egypt ===
Head coach: (Egypt) Diaa El-Sayed

No.	Pos.	Player	Date of birth (age)	Caps	Goals	Club
1	GK	**Ahmed El Shenawy**	14 May 1991 (aged 20)	9	0	(Egyptian Football Association) Al-Masry
2	DF	**Mahmoud Alaa**	28 January 1991 (aged 20)			(Egyptian Football Association) Haras El-Hodood
3	DF	**Ayman Ashraf**	9 April 1991 (aged 20)			(Egyptian Football Association) Al-Ahly
4	DF	**Mohamed Abdelfattah**	17 April 1991 (aged 20)			(Egyptian Football Association) Al-Ahly
5	MF	**Saleh Gomaa**	1 August 1993 (aged 17)			(Egyptian Football Association) ENPPI
6	DF	**Ahmed Hegazi**	25 January 1991 (aged 20)			(Egyptian Football Association) Ismaily
7	DF	**Hussein El Sayed**	18 September 1991 (aged 19)			(Egyptian Football Association) Al-Ahly
8	DF	**Ahmed Sobhi**	4 March 1991 (aged 20)			(Egyptian Football Association) ENPPI
9	FW	**Hamdy Zaky**	13 December 1991 (aged 19)			(Egyptian Football Association) Ittihad
10	MF	Manga	24 December 1991 (aged 19)			(Egyptian Football Association) Al-Ahly
11	DF	**Ali Fathy**	2 January 1992 (aged 19)			(Egyptian Football Association) Al-Mokawloon Al-Arab
12	FW	**Mohamed Salah**	15 June 1992 (aged 19)			(Egyptian Football Association) Al-Mokawloon Al-Arab
13	DF	**Ahmed Tawfik**	1 October 1991 (aged 19)			(Egyptian Football Association) Zamalek
14	MF	**Mohamed Ibrahim**	1 March 1992 (aged 19)			(Egyptian Football Association) Zamalek
15	DF	**Mahmoud Ezzat**	1 May 1992 (aged 19)			(Egyptian Football Association) Al-Mokawloon Al-Arab
16	GK	**Mohamed Awad**	6 July 1992 (aged 19)			(Egyptian Football Association) Ismaily
17	MF	**Mohamed Elneny**	19 July 1992 (aged 19)			(Egyptian Football Association) Al-Mokawloon Al-Arab
18	DF	**Omar Gaber**	30 January 1992 (aged 19)			(Egyptian Football Association) Zamalek
19	FW	**Koka**	5 March 1993 (aged 18)			(Egyptian Football Association) Al-Ahly
20	MF	Mohamed Ghazi	12 November 1992 (aged 18)			(Egyptian Football Association) ENPPI
21	GK	Ahmed Behiry	1 April 1991 (aged 20)			(Egyptian Football Association) Al-Mokawloon Al-Arab

=== Panama ===
Head coach: (Panama) Alfredo Poyatos

No.	Pos.	Player	Date of birth (age)	Caps	Goals	Club
1	GK	**Luis Mejía**	16 March 1991 (aged 20)			(French Football Federation) Toulouse
2	DF	Edward Benítez	15 October 1991 (aged 19)			(Panamanian Football Federation) Chorrillo
3	DF	**Harold Cummings**	1 March 1992 (aged 19)			(Uruguayan Football Association) River Plate Montevideo
4	DF	Josué Flores	31 March 1993 (aged 18)			(Panamanian Football Federation) Chorrillo
5	MF	**Manuel Vargas**	19 January 1991 (aged 20)			(Panamanian Football Federation) Tauro
6	DF	Francisco Vence	19 April 1992 (aged 19)			(Panamanian Football Federation) Chorrillo
7	FW	**Jairo Jiménez**	7 January 1993 (aged 18)			(Panamanian Football Federation) Chorrillo
8	MF	Paul Cordero	28 March 1991 (aged 20)			(Panamanian Football Federation) Chepo
9	FW	**Cecilio Waterman**	13 April 1991 (aged 20)			(Uruguayan Football Association) Fénix
10	MF	Josimar Gómez	8 June 1992 (aged 19)			(Panamanian Football Federation) Chepo
11	MF	**Erick Davis**	31 March 1991 (aged 20)			(Panamanian Football Federation) Árabe Unido
12	GK	**Kevin Melgar**	19 November 1992 (aged 18)			(Panamanian Football Federation) Alianza
13	DF	**Roderick Miller**	3 April 1992 (aged 19)			(Panamanian Football Federation) San Francisco
14	MF	Josué Gómez	19 January 1991 (aged 20)			(Panamanian Football Federation) Árabe Unido
15	FW	Javier Caicedo	14 July 1991 (aged 20)			(Panamanian Football Federation) Club Plaza Amador
16	MF	Rolando Botelló	20 November 1991 (aged 19)			(Panamanian Football Federation) Tauro
17	FW	Gabriel Ávila	12 April 1991 (aged 20)			(Panamanian Football Federation) Atlético Chiriquí
18	DF	Algish Dixon	12 March 1992 (aged 19)			(Panamanian Football Federation) Alianza
19	MF	Alan Hernández	19 January 1992 (aged 19)			(Italian Football Federation) Chievo
20	FW	José Diego Álvarez	25 August 1992 (aged 18)			(Football Association of the Czech Republic) Slavia Prague
21	GK	Adnihell Ariano	14 January 1991 (aged 20)			(Panamanian Football Federation) Tauro

== Group F ==
=== Argentina ===
Head coach: (Colombia) (Argentina) Walter Perazzo

No.	Pos.	Player	Date of birth (age)	Caps	Goals	Club
1	GK	**Esteban Andrada**	26 January 1991 (aged 20)	9	0	(Argentine Football Association) Lanús
2	DF	**Germán Pezzella**	27 June 1991 (aged 20)	0	0	(Argentine Football Association) River Plate
3	DF	**Nicolás Tagliafico**	31 August 1992 (aged 18)	0	0	(Argentine Football Association) Banfield
4	DF	Hugo Nervo	6 January 1991 (aged 20)	0	0	(Argentine Football Association) Arsenal
5	MF	Ezequiel Cirigliano	24 January 1992 (aged 19)	2	0	(Argentine Football Association) River Plate
6	DF	**Leonel Galeano**	2 August 1991 (aged 19)	0	0	(Argentine Football Association) Independiente
7	MF	Matías Laba	19 December 1991 (aged 19)	0	0	(Argentine Football Association) Argentinos Juniors
8	MF	**Roberto Pereyra**	7 January 1991 (aged 20)	0	0	(Argentine Football Association) River Plate
9	FW	Facundo Ferreyra	14 March 1991 (aged 20)	0	0	(Argentine Football Association) Banfield
10	MF	**Erik Lamela**	25 March 1992 (aged 19)	1	0	(Italian Football Federation) Roma
11	FW	**Juan Iturbe**	4 June 1993 (aged 18)	0	0	(Portuguese Football Federation) Porto
12	GK	Rodrigo Rey	8 March 1991 (aged 20)	0	0	(Argentine Football Association) River Plate
13	DF	Lucas Kruspzky	6 April 1992 (aged 19)	8	0	(Argentine Football Association) Independiente
14	DF	Adrián Martínez	13 February 1992 (aged 19)	0	0	(Argentine Football Association) San Lorenzo
15	MF	Alan Ruiz	19 August 1993 (aged 17)	2	0	(Argentine Football Association) Gimnasia (LP)
16	MF	Lucas Villafáñez	4 October 1991 (aged 19)	3	0	(Argentine Football Association) Independiente
17	MF	**Rodrigo Battaglia**	12 July 1991 (aged 20)	8	0	(Argentine Football Association) Huracán
18	DF	Leandro González Pírez	26 February 1992 (aged 19)	0	0	(Argentine Football Association) River Plate
19	FW	Agustín Vuletich	3 November 1991 (aged 19)	0	0	(Argentine Football Association) Vélez Sársfield
20	FW	Carlos Luque	1 March 1993 (aged 18)	0	0	(Argentine Football Association) Colón
21	GK	**Emiliano Martínez**	2 September 1992 (aged 18)	0	0	(The Football Association) Arsenal

=== England ===
Head coach: (England) Brian Eastick

No.	Pos.	Player	Date of birth (age)	Caps	Goals	Club
1	GK	**Jack Butland**	10 March 1993 (aged 18)	0	0	(The Football Association) Birmingham City
2	DF	Blair Adams	8 September 1991 (aged 19)	0	0	(The Football Association) Sunderland
3	DF	Nathan Baker	23 April 1991 (aged 20)	0	0	(The Football Association) Aston Villa
4	FW	**Saido Berahino**	4 August 1993 (aged 17)	0	0	(The Football Association) West Bromwich Albion
5	MF	Reece Brown	1 November 1991 (aged 19)	1	0	(The Football Association) Manchester United
6	DF	Ben Gordon	2 March 1991 (aged 20)	0	0	(The Football Association) Chelsea
7	DF	James Hurst	31 January 1992 (aged 19)	0	0	(The Football Association) West Bromwich Albion
8	MF	Billy Knott	28 December 1992 (aged 18)	0	0	(The Football Association) Sunderland
9	MF	Jason Lowe	2 September 1991 (aged 19)	1	0	(The Football Association) Blackburn Rovers
10	FW	Callum McManaman	25 April 1991 (aged 20)	0	0	(The Football Association) Wigan Athletic
11	FW	Josh Morris	30 September 1991 (aged 19)	1	0	(The Football Association) Blackburn Rovers
12	FW	Michael Ngoo	23 October 1992 (aged 18)	3	0	(The Football Association) Liverpool
13	GK	Lee Nicholls	5 October 1992 (aged 18)	0	0	(The Football Association) Wigan Athletic
15	MF	Dean Parrett	16 November 1991 (aged 19)	1	0	(The Football Association) Tottenham Hotspur
16	MF	**Matt Phillips**	13 March 1991 (aged 20)	1	0	(The Football Association) Blackpool
17	DF	Adam Smith	29 April 1991 (aged 20)	1	0	(The Football Association) Tottenham Hotspur
18	DF	George Taft	29 July 1993 (aged 18)	0	0	(The Football Association) Leicester City
19	DF	Reece Wabara	28 December 1991 (aged 19)	1	0	(The Football Association) Manchester City
20	MF	James Wallace	19 December 1991 (aged 19)	1	0	(The Football Association) Everton
21	GK	Jak Alnwick	17 June 1993 (aged 18)	0	0	(The Football Association) Newcastle United

- Ryan Noble did not travel with the squad from their training camp in Denver, Colorado, to their base in Colombia, as he picked up a back injury in a training session.
- Dean Parrett returned home before England's round of 16 match with Nigeria, after injuring himself, also in a training session

=== Mexico ===
Head coach: (Mexico) Juan Carlos Chávez

No.	Pos.	Player	Date of birth (age)	Caps	Goals	Club
1	GK	**José Antonio Rodríguez**	4 July 1992 (aged 19)	0	0	(Mexican Football Federation) Veracruz
2	DF	Kristian Álvarez	20 April 1992 (aged 19)	0	0	(Mexican Football Federation) Guadalajara
3	DF	Héctor Acosta	24 November 1991 (aged 19)	0	0	(Mexican Football Federation) Toluca
4	DF	**Néstor Araujo**	29 August 1991 (aged 19)	0	0	(Mexican Football Federation) Cruz Azul
5	MF	Diego de Buen	13 July 1991 (aged 20)	0	0	(Mexican Football Federation) UNAM
6	MF	Marvin Piñón	12 June 1991 (aged 20)	0	0	(Mexican Football Federation) Monterrey
7	MF	Saúl Villalobos	26 June 1991 (aged 20)	0	0	(Mexican Football Federation) Atlas
8	MF	Carlos Orrantia	1 February 1991 (aged 20)	0	0	(Mexican Football Federation) UNAM
9	FW	Taufic Guarch	4 October 1991 (aged 19)	0	0	(Mexican Football Federation) Estudiantes Tecos
10	FW	**Erick Torres**	19 January 1993 (aged 18)	0	0	(Mexican Football Federation) Guadalajara
11	MF	Ulises Dávila	13 April 1991 (aged 20)	0	0	(Mexican Football Federation) Guadalajara
12	GK	Carlos López	21 March 1991 (aged 20)	0	0	(Argentine Football Association) Talleres de Córdoba
13	MF	Lugiani Gallardo	20 April 1991 (aged 20)	0	0	(Mexican Football Federation) América
14	MF	**Jorge Enríquez** (c)	8 January 1991 (aged 20)	0	0	(Mexican Football Federation) Guadalajara
15	DF	César Ibáñez	1 April 1992 (aged 19)	0	0	(Mexican Football Federation) Santos Laguna
16	DF	Jorge Valencia	6 April 1991 (aged 20)	0	0	(Mexican Football Federation) UANL
17	FW	**Alan Pulido**	8 March 1991 (aged 20)	0	0	(Mexican Football Federation) UANL
18	DF	**Diego Reyes**	19 September 1992 (aged 18)	0	0	(Mexican Football Federation) América
19	FW	Édson Rivera	4 November 1991 (aged 19)	0	0	(Mexican Football Federation) Atlas
20	FW	David Izazola	23 October 1991 (aged 19)	0	0	(Mexican Football Federation) UNAM
21	GK	**Julio González**	23 April 1991 (aged 20)	0	0	(Mexican Football Federation) Santos Laguna

=== North Korea ===
Head coach: (North Korea) Yun Jong-su

No.	Pos.	Player	Date of birth (age)	Caps	Club
1	GK	Om Jin-song	16 January 1991 (aged 20)		(North Korea) Kigwancha
2	DF	Kim Song-hak	17 September 1991 (aged 19)		(North Korea) Pyongyang City
3	DF	**Jang Song-hyok**	18 January 1991 (aged 20)		(North Korea) Rimyongsu
4	DF	Nam Chol-hyon	16 August 1991 (aged 19)		(North Korea) Sobaeksu
5	DF	**Ri Hyong-mu**	4 November 1991 (aged 19)		(North Korea) Sobaeksu
6	DF	**Ri Il-jin**	28 August 1993 (aged 17)		(North Korea) Sobaeksu
7	FW	**Pak Song-chol**	20 March 1991 (aged 20)		(North Korea) 25 April
8	FW	**Ri Hyon-song**	23 December 1992 (aged 18)		(North Korea) Ryongnamsan
9	FW	Mun Hyok	16 November 1993 (aged 17)		(North Korea) Sobaeksu
10	FW	**Jong Il-gwan**	30 October 1992 (aged 18)		(North Korea) Rimyongsu
11	MF	**Kim Ju-song**	15 October 1993 (aged 17)		(North Korea) 25 April
12	MF	**Ri Hyong-jin**	19 July 1993 (aged 18)		(North Korea) 25 April
13	MF	Kang Won-myong	2 July 1991 (aged 20)		(North Korea) Rimyongsu
14	DF	**Jang Kuk-chol**	16 February 1994 (aged 17)		(North Korea) Rimyongsu
15	DF	**Ri Yong-chol**	8 January 1991 (aged 20)		(North Korea) Kyonggongop
16	FW	Han Song-hyok	4 August 1993 (aged 17)		(North Korea) 25 April
17	MF	Ri Hyok-chol	2 September 1992 (aged 18)		(North Korea) Rimyongsu
18	GK	Han Song-hwan	2 March 1993 (aged 18)		(North Korea) Amrokgang
19	FW	**Kye Song-hyok**	12 November 1992 (aged 18)		(North Korea) 25 April
20	DF	Kang Il-nam	23 November 1994 (aged 16)		(North Korea) 25 April
21	GK	Kim Chol-nam	2 January 1991 (aged 20)		(North Korea) 25 April

== Player statistics ==
Player representation by club

Players	Clubs
7	(North Korea) 25 April, (France) Lyon, (Costa Rica) Saprissa
6	(Spain) Barcelona, (Guatemala) Comunicaciones, (Argentina) River Plate
5	(Saudi Arabia) Al-Ahli, (Egypt) Al-Ahly, (Saudi Arabia) Al-Ittihad, (Egypt) Al-Mokawloon Al-Arab (Uruguay) Defensor Sporting, (Croatia) Hajduk Split
4	(Costa Rica) Alajuelense, (Spain) Atlético Madrid, (Australia) Central Coast Mariners (Panama) Chorrillo, (Brazil) Flamengo, (Mexico) Guadalajara, (Brazil) São Paulo (North Korea) Sobaeksu, (Mali) Stade Malien

Player representation by league

Country	Players
Total	504
England	31
Spain	30
France	25
Portugal	24
Argentina	21
(North Korea) Korea DPR	21
Saudi Arabia	21
Egypt	21
Mexico	21
South Korea	20
Ecuador	19
Uruguay	18
Brazil	18
Colombia	14
Others	224

The England, Saudi Arabia, Egypt and North Korea squads were made up entirely of players from the respective countries' domestic leagues. Although Italy failed to qualify for the finals, their domestic leagues were represented by 9 players. Altogether, there were 37 national leagues that had players in the tournament.
