= Jean Efala =

Cameroonian footballer

Jean Efala Komguep
Personal information
- Date of birth: 11 August 1992 (age 34)
- Place of birth: Mfou, Cameroon
- Position: Goalkeeper

Team information
- Current team: Akwa United
- Number: 1

Youth career
- 2010–11: Fovu Club Baham

Senior career*
| Years | Team | Apps | (Gls) |
| 2012–2018 | Coton Sport | 96 | (0) |
| 2018– | Akwa United | 31 | (0) |

International career
| 2011–2013 | Cameroon U20 | 12 | (0) |
| 2012–2013 | Cameroon | 1 | (0) |
Medal record
Representing Cameroon
Men's football
Africa Cup of Nations
| Third place | 2021 Cameroon |
- * Club domestic league appearances and goals as of 1 January 2022

Jean Efala Komguep (born 11 August 1992) is a Cameroonian footballer who plays as a goalkeeper for Nigerian Professional Football League club Akwa United. He made one appearance for the Cameroon national team in 2013. He previously represented the Cameroon U20 national team.

== Club career ==
Efala was born in Mfou. He began his professional playing career in 2010 to Fovu Baham. He was later sold to Coton Sport F.C. for whom he appeared in several matches, including in the CAF Champions League.

In 2018, he joined Nigerian side Akwa United and played seven matches en route to the club's first league title in 2021.

== International career ==
In 2011 Efala was called up to the Cameroon under-20 national team to take part in the FIFA World Cup Under-20. He received his first international call-up against Tanzania on 6 February 2013 and has since been called up to the senior national team several times.

== Honours ==
Coton Sport

- Elite One: 2013, 2014, 2015
- Cameroonian Cup: 2014

Akwa United

- NPFL: 2020–21
