= Christoph Riegler =

Austrian footballer (born 1992)

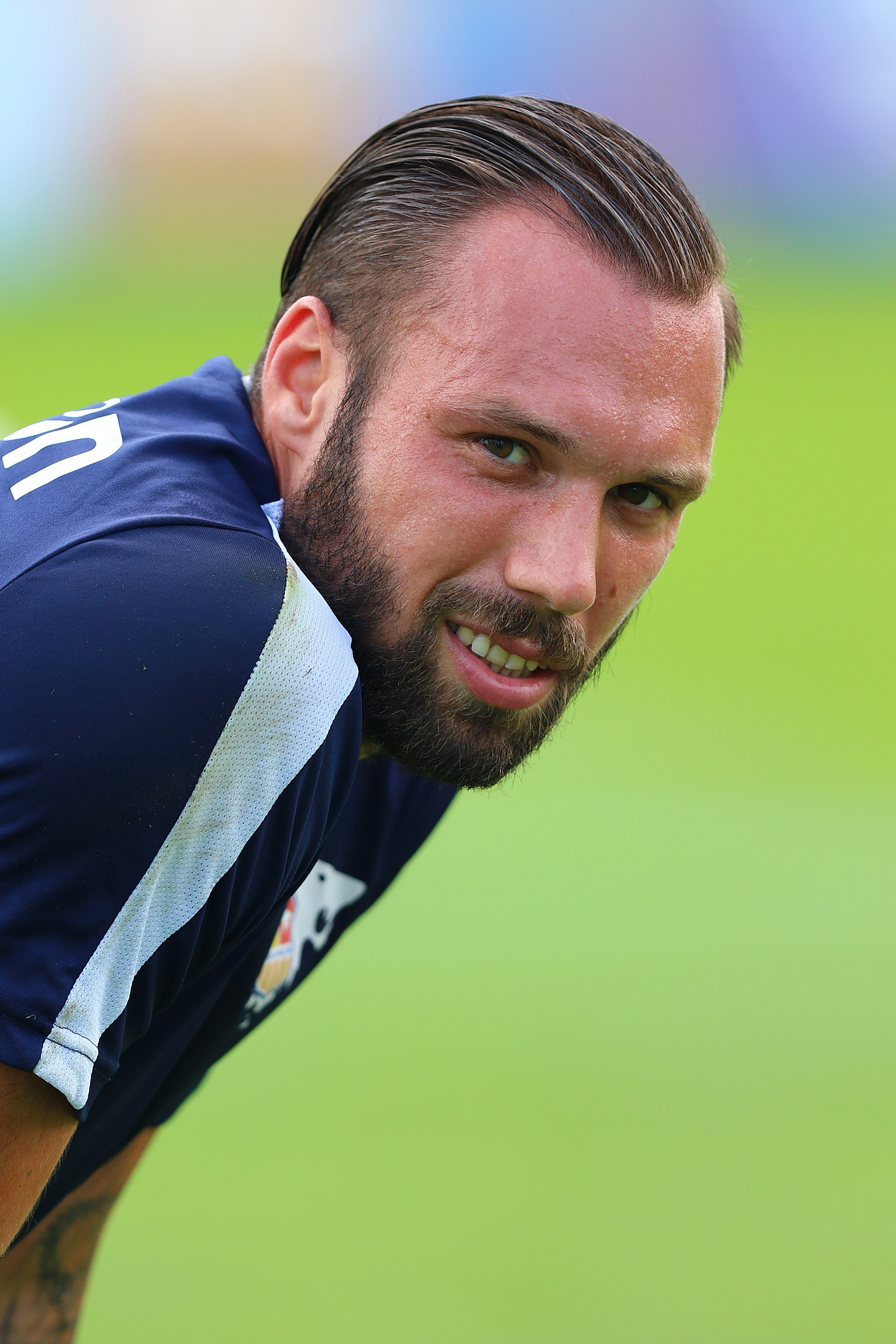
- Riegler in May 2018.

Personal information
- Date of birth: 30 March 1992 (age 34)
- Place of birth: Ybbs an der Donau, Austria
- Height: 1.87 m (6 ft 2 in)
- Position: Goalkeeper

Team information
- Current team: Kremser SC
- Number: 1

Youth career
- 2006–2007: SK Rapid Wien
- 2007–2010: SKN St. Pölten

Senior career*
| Years | Team | Apps | (Gls) |
| 2010–2021 | SKN St. Pölten | 318 | (0) |
| 2022 | Rheindorf Altach | 0 | (0) |
| 2023– | Kremser SC | 103 | (0) |

International career^{‡}
| 2012–2014 | Austria U21 | 11 | (0) |
- * Club domestic league appearances and goals as of 28 June 2026 ‡ National team caps and goals as of 20 April 2014

Christoph Riegler (born 30 March 1992) is an Austrian footballer who plays as a goalkeeper for Austrian Regionalliga East club Kremser SC.

== Club career ==
Riegler joined the youth set-up of SKN St. Pölten from SK Rapid Wien in March 2007, and he advanced quickly through the club's youth system, making his debut in the Austrian Football First League as a stand in for injured first-choice goalkeeper Thomas Vollnhofer in a 1–0 win against SC Austria Lustenau on 15 October 2010. Riegler's performances were such that he remained in the first team after Vollnhofer returned from injury. From 30 March 2011, Riegler dropped down to the bench so that he could focus on his schoolwork. After missing the start of the following season due to international commitments, Riegler re-established himself as his team's first-choice goalkeeper on his return.

On 23 December 2021, it was announced that Riegler would join SC Rheindorf Altach on a six-month contract, after having played more than 10 seasons and 300 league games for SKN St. Pölten.

In January 2023, Riegler signed with Austrian Regionalliga East club Kremser SC, after six months as a free agent.

== International career ==
Riegler has represented the Austria under-21s on eight occasions, and he was an unused member of the Austrian squad at the 2011 FIFA Under-20 World Cup.

== Honours ==
SKN St. Pölten

- 2. Liga: 2015–16
