= Jhonny da Silva =

Uruguayan footballer (born 1991)

Personal information
- Full name: Jhonny Alexander da Silva Sosa
- Date of birth: 21 August 1991 (age 35)
- Place of birth: Pando, Uruguay
- Height: 1.82 m (6 ft 0 in)
- Position: Goalkeeper

Team information
- Current team: Montevideo Wanderers
- Number: 25

Senior career*
Years	Team	Apps	(Gls)
2009–2012	Tacuarembó	37	(0)
2012–2013	Nueva Chicago	5	(0)
2013–2014	El Tanque Sisley	12	(0)
2015–2017	Atlético Huila	60	(0)
2017–2018	El Tanque Sisley	12	(0)
2018–2019	Cúcuta Deportivo	12	(0)
2020	Temperley	0	(0)
2020–2021	Rampla Juniors	15	(0)
2021–2022	Villa Teresa	11	(0)
2022	La Luz	26	(0)
2023	Albion	31	(0)
2024–	Montevideo Wanderers	15	(0)

International career
2011	Uruguay U20	2	(0)
- * Club domestic league appearances and goals as of 7 September 2024

Jhonny Alexander da Silva Sosa (born 21 August 1991) is an Uruguayan footballer who plays in Uruguayan Primera División for Montevideo Wanderers as a goalkeeper.

== International career ==
He was part of the Uruguay U-20 squad that participated in the 2011 South American Youth Championship which qualified his country to the Youth World Cup in Colombia, tournament where he was used as second goalkeeper.
