= Cameroon national under-20 football team =

National under-20 association football team representing Cameroon

Cameroon Under-20
- Nickname(s): Les Lions Indomptables (The Indomitable Lions)
- Association: Cameroonian Football Federation
- Confederation: CAF (Africa)
- Head coach: Martin Ndtoungou
- Captain: Jean Efala (2011)
- Home stadium: Stade Omnisports
- FIFA code: CMR
First colours	Second colours

The Cameroon national under-20 football team, more commonly known as The Indomitable Lions, represents Cameroon in international youth football competitions. The Stade Omnisports (Stade Ahmadou Ahidjo) in Yaounde is used for home games.

== Appearances ==
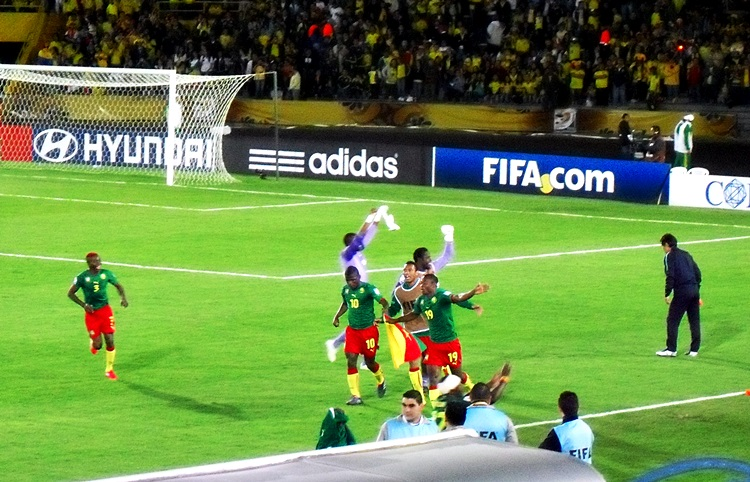
2011 FIFA U-20 World Cup, Celebration after defeating Uruguay national under-20 football team

Year	Round	GP	W	D*	L	GS	GA
(Tunisia) 1977	did not qualify						
(Japan) 1979	did not qualify						
(Australia) 1981	Group Stage	3	0	1	2	3	6
(Mexico) 1983	did not qualify						
(Soviet Union) 1985	did not qualify						
(Chile) 1987	did not qualify						
(Saudi Arabia) 1989	did not qualify						
(Portugal) 1991	did not qualify						
(Australia) 1993	Group Stage	3	1	0	2	4	5
(Qatar) 1995	Quarter-finals	4	2	1	1	7	6
(Malaysia) 1997	did not qualify						
(Nigeria) 1999	Round of 16	4	2	0	2	8	9
(Argentina) 2001	did not qualify						
(United Arab Emirates) 2003	did not qualify						
(Netherlands) 2005	did not qualify						
(Canada) 2007	did not qualify						
(Egypt) 2009	Group Stage	3	1	0	2	3	7
(Colombia) 2011	Round of 16	4	1	2	1	3	3
(Turkey) 2013	did not qualify						
(New Zealand) 2015	did not qualify						
(South Korea) 2017	did not qualify						
(Poland) 2019	did not qualify						
(Argentina) 2023	did not qualify						
(Chile) 2025	did not qualify						
(Azerbaijan) (Uzbekistan) 2027	to be determined						
(Armenia) (Georgia (country)) 2029	to be determined						
Total	6/25	21	7	4	10	28	36

== Honors ==
- African Youth Championship
  - Winners (1): 1995
  - Runners-up (4): 1981, 1993, 2009, 2011
  - Third Place (1): 1999
- Jeux de la Francophonie
  - Third Place: 1997
  - Fourth Place: 2001, 2005

== Squad ==
The following squad was selected for the 2023 Africa U-20 Cup of Nations.

No.	Pos.	Player	Date of birth (age)	Club
1	GK	Jacques Kenmogne	10 December 2003 (aged 17)	(Cameroonian Football Federation) APEJES Academy
2	DF	Toussaint Njomo	5 April 2002 (aged 19)	(Cameroonian Football Federation) Young Sports Academy de Bamenda
3	DF	Fabrice Moudiki	4 June 2001 (aged 19)	(Cameroonian Football Federation) Fauve Azur de Yaoundé
4	DF	Adrien Tchokote	23 November 2002 (aged 18)	(French Football Federation) Montpellier HSC
5	DF	Emmanuel Ngolle	3 September 2003 (aged 17)	(Cameroonian Football Federation) APEJES Academy
6	MF	François Dikobe	17 November 2001 (aged 19)	(Cameroonian Football Federation) Renaissance FC de Ngoumou
7	FW	Alexandre Essomba	25 July 2003 (aged 17)	(Cameroonian Football Federation) Sahel FC
8	MF	Silas Mbonjo		(Cameroonian Football Federation) Djiko FC de Bandjoun
9	FW	Didier Ngonzo		(Cameroonian Football Federation) Renaissance FC de Ngoumou
10	FW	Guillaume Fomumbod	18 August 2002 (aged 18)	(Portuguese Football Federation) Vitória de Guimarães
11	FW	Yannick Tchakounte		(Cameroonian Football Federation) APEJES Academy
12	MF	Fabien Ngwa		
13	MF	Achille Tchoungui		(Croatian Football Federation) NK Lokomotiva
14	DF	Patrice Kemajou		(French Football Federation) Stade de Reims
15	MF	Sébastien Njikam		(Football Association of the Czech Republic) MFK Vyškov
16	GK	Olivier Fopa		(Cameroonian Football Federation) Coton Sport FC de Garoua
17	MF	Didier Njomo		(Cameroonian Football Federation) PWD Bamenda
18	MF	Théophile Kamga		(Austrian Football Association) FC Admira Wacker Mödling
19	FW	Vincent Ngo'o		(Cameroonian Football Federation) APEJES Academy
20	DF	Michel Dikobe		(Cameroonian Football Federation) Dragon FC de Yaoundé
21	GK	Ghislain Fouda	9 July 2002 (aged 18)	(French Football Federation) LB Châteauroux
22	DF	Lucas Fomekong	22 May 2002 (aged 18)	(French Football Federation) AS Saint-Étienne
23	MF	Thierry Nkou		(Cameroonian Football Federation) RC Bafoussam
24	FW	Christophe Ngoumou		(Cameroonian Football Federation) AS Ngangue Douala
25	DF	Joseph Tchatchoua		(Cameroonian Football Federation) Coton Sport FC de Garoua
26	MF	Évariste Fogang		(Cameroonian Football Federation) Fauve Azur de Yaoundé
27	FW	Gilles Tchoutchoui		(Turkish Football Federation) Adanaspor

=== Past squads ===
The squad that played the 2011 FIFA U-20 World Cup Head coach: (Cameroon) Martin Ndtoungou

No.	Pos.	Player	Date of birth (age)	Caps	Goals	Club
1	GK	Thierry Tangouatio	4 May 1992 (aged 19)			(Cameroonian Football Federation) Sable de Batié
2	DF	Eric Nyatchou	3 June 1991 (aged 20)			(French Football Federation) Racing Strasbourg
3	DF	Ambroise Oyongo	22 June 1991 (aged 20)			(Cameroonian Football Federation) Coton Sport
4	DF	Yaya Banana	29 July 1991 (aged 20)			(Tunisian Football Federation) Espérance de Tunis
5	DF	Ghislain Mvom	23 October 1992 (aged 18)			(Cameroonian Football Federation) Les Astres
6	DF	Idriss Nguessi	2 May 1992 (aged 19)			(Cameroonian Football Federation) Etoa Meki
7	MF	Edgar Salli	17 August 1992 (aged 18)			(French Football Federation) Monaco
8	MF	Emmanuel Mbongo	13 March 1993 (aged 18)			(Cameroonian Football Federation) Coton Sport
9	FW	Franck Ohandza	28 September 1991 (aged 19)			(Football Association of Thailand) Buriram United
10	MF	Clarence Bitang	2 September 1992 (aged 18)			(Football Association of Thailand) Buriram United
11	FW	Yannick Makota	20 January 1992 (aged 19)			(French Football Federation) Nancy
12	MF	Franck Nkom	18 September 1991 (aged 19)			(Cameroonian Football Federation) Panthère FC
13	DF	Serge Tchana	4 August 1993 (aged 17)			(Royal Spanish Football Federation) Torre Levante
14	MF	Yazid Atouba	2 January 1993 (aged 18)			(Cameroonian Football Federation) Renaissance
15	DF	Maxime Mengue	17 November 1991 (aged 19)			(Cameroonian Football Federation) Canon Yaoundé
16	GK	Jean Efala	11 August 1992 (aged 18)			(Cameroonian Football Federation) Fovu
17	DF	Jushua Mbuluba	15 January 1992 (aged 19)			(Cameroonian Football Federation) Renaissance
18	MF	Hervé Mbega	5 January 1994 (aged 17)			(Royal Spanish Football Federation) Mallorca
19	FW	Christ Mbondi	2 February 1992 (aged 19)			(Swiss Football Association) Sion
20	FW	Eric Same	23 February 1992 (aged 19)			(Royal Spanish Football Federation) Huracán Valencia
21	GK	Eric Ngana	3 October 1992 (aged 18)			(Cameroonian Football Federation) Renaissance

== Head-to-head record ==
The following table shows Cameroon's head-to-head record in the FIFA U-20 World Cup.

Opponent	Pld	W	D	L	GF	GA	GD	Win %
Argentina	2	0	0	2	0	3	−3	0.00
Australia	3	2	1	0	8	5	+3	66.67
Colombia	1	0	0	1	2	3	−1	0.00
Costa Rica	1	1	0	0	3	1	+2	100.00
England	2	1	0	1	1	2	−1	50.00
Germany	2	0	1	1	1	4	−3	0.00
Japan	1	1	0	0	2	1	+1	100.00
Mali	1	0	0	1	4	5	−1	0.00
Mexico	1	0	1	0	1	1	+0	0.00
New Zealand	1	0	1	0	1	1	+0	0.00
Portugal	1	0	0	1	0	1	−1	0.00
Russia	1	0	0	1	0	2	−2	0.00
South Korea	1	1	0	0	2	0	+2	100.00
United States	2	0	0	2	2	7	−5	0.00
Uruguay	1	1	0	0	1	0	+1	100.00
Total	21	7	4	10	28	36	−8	33.33
