= Alan Hernández =

Panamanian footballer (born 1992)

Personal information
- Full name: Alan Ariel Hernández Rodríguez
- Date of birth: 19 January 1992 (age 34)
- Place of birth: Panama
- Height: 1.84 m (6 ft 0 in)
- Position: Forward

Senior career*
Years	Team	Apps	(Gls)
2007-2010	FC Internazionale Milano	6	(0)
2011–2013	Chievo	0	(0)
2012	→ Vallée d'Aoste (loan)	3	(0)
2013–2014	Universitario (Panama)	28	(3)
2014–2015	Atlético Chiriquí	7	(0)
- * Club domestic league appearances and goals

Alan Ariel Hernández Rodríguez (born 19 January 1992) is a Panamanian former footballer who played as an attacker.

== Career ==
=== Club career ===
Hernández started his career with Panamanian side Atlético Chiriquí after almost joining the youth academy of Ajax in The Netherlands. In 2011, he signed for Italian Serie A side Chievo. In 2012, Hernández was sent on loan to Vallée d'Aoste in the Italian third tier, where he made 3 league appearances and scored 0 goals. On 23 September 2012, he debuted for Vallée d'Aoste during a 0–2 loss to Rimini. In 2013, Hernández signed for Panamanian club Universitario (Panama), helping them win the league.

=== International career ===
He represented Panama at the 2011 FIFA U-20 World Cup.
