= Nuestra Fiesta (song) =

2011 song by Jorge Celedon and Jimmy Zambrano

Nuetra Fiesta is the official song of 2011 FIFA U-20 World Cup, interpreted by Colombian singers Jorge Celedon and Jimmy Zambrano. The song was performed in the opening ceremony of the cup that took place in Barranquilla and was broadcast for around 160 countries. During the ceremony, was made a tribute to the recently deceased Colombian singer Joe Arroyo.
