= Lucas Veronese =

French footballer (born 1991)

Personal information
- Date of birth: 6 February 1991 (age 35)
- Place of birth: Cagnes-sur-Mer, France
- Height: 1.87 m (6 ft 2 in)
- Position: Goalkeeper

Senior career*
Years	Team	Apps	(Gls)
2010–2014	Nice	5	(0)
2012–2013	→ Istres (loan)	3	(0)
2014–2015	Amiens	14	(0)
- * Club domestic league appearances and goals

Luca Veronese (born 6 February 1991) is a retired French professional footballer who played as a goalkeeper. He made his professional debut for Istres in a 1–2 defeat against Clermont Foot in the Coupe de la Ligue on 7 August 2012.
