= Leandro Gelpi =

Uruguayan footballer (born 1991)

Personal information
- Full name: Leandro Gelpi Rosales
- Date of birth: 27 February 1991 (age 35)
- Place of birth: Montevideo, Uruguay
- Height: 1.85 m (6 ft 1 in)
- Position: Goalkeeper

Team information
- Current team: Villa Española

Youth career
- Peñarol

Senior career*
Years	Team	Apps	(Gls)
2009–2018	Peñarol	11	(0)
2012–2013	→ Racing Montevideo (loan)	11	(0)
2015–2016	→ El Tanque Sisley (loan)	23	(0)
2016–2017	→ La Equidad (loan)	13	(0)
2018	Rentistas	11	(0)
2019	Santiago Morning	4	(0)
2020–2021	Deportivo Maldonado	1	(0)
2021–2022	Rampla Juniors	0	(0)
2022	Deportivo La Guaira	1	(0)
2023	Juventud Las Piedras	10	(0)
2024–	Villa Española	–	(–)

International career
2012	Uruguay Olympic	0	(0)
- * Club domestic league appearances and goals as of 22 October 2024

Leandro Gelpi Rosales (born 27 February 1991) is a Uruguayan professional footballer who plays as a goalkeeper for Villa Española.

== Career ==
In 2019, Gelpi played for Chilean club Santiago Morning.

In 2024, Gelpi joined Villa Española in the Uruguayan Primera División Amateur.

He was called up for the Uruguay Olympic football team, which was competing at the 2012 Summer Olympics, but did not play.
