= Juan Govea =

Ecuadorian footballer (born 1991)

Personal information
- Full name: Juan José Govea Tenorio
- Date of birth: 27 January 1991 (age 35)
- Place of birth: Esmeraldas, Ecuador
- Height: 1.75 m (5 ft 9 in)
- Position: Forward

Team information
- Current team: Mushuc Runa
- Number: 10

Youth career
- 2005–2008: Deportivo Cuenca

Senior career*
Years	Team	Apps	(Gls)
2008–2011	Deportivo Cuenca	74	(15)
2011–2015	El Nacional	43	(12)
2013	→ Morelia (loan)	7	(0)
2014	→ Deportivo Cuenca (loan)	33	(1)
2015–2016	Mushuc Runa	35	(10)
2016	Atlético Tucumán	10	(1)
2016–2017	Douglas Haig	13	(3)
2017–2019	Aucas		
2019	Independiente del Valle	13	(4)
2020–	Mushuc Runa	9	(0)

International career
2011	Ecuador	1	(0)
- * Club domestic league appearances and goals as of 12:51, 29 September 2020 (UTC)

Juan José Govea Tenorio (born 27 January 1991) is an Ecuadorian international footballer who plays for Mushuc Runa of the Ecuadorian Serie A as a forward.

== Career ==
Born in Esmeraldas, Govea is a product of Deportivo Cuenca's youth system,; he made his senior professional debut for them in 2008.

He made his international debut for Ecuador in 2011, and participated at the 2011 FIFA U-20 World Cup.
