= Peter Suswam =

Nigerian footballer (born 1991)

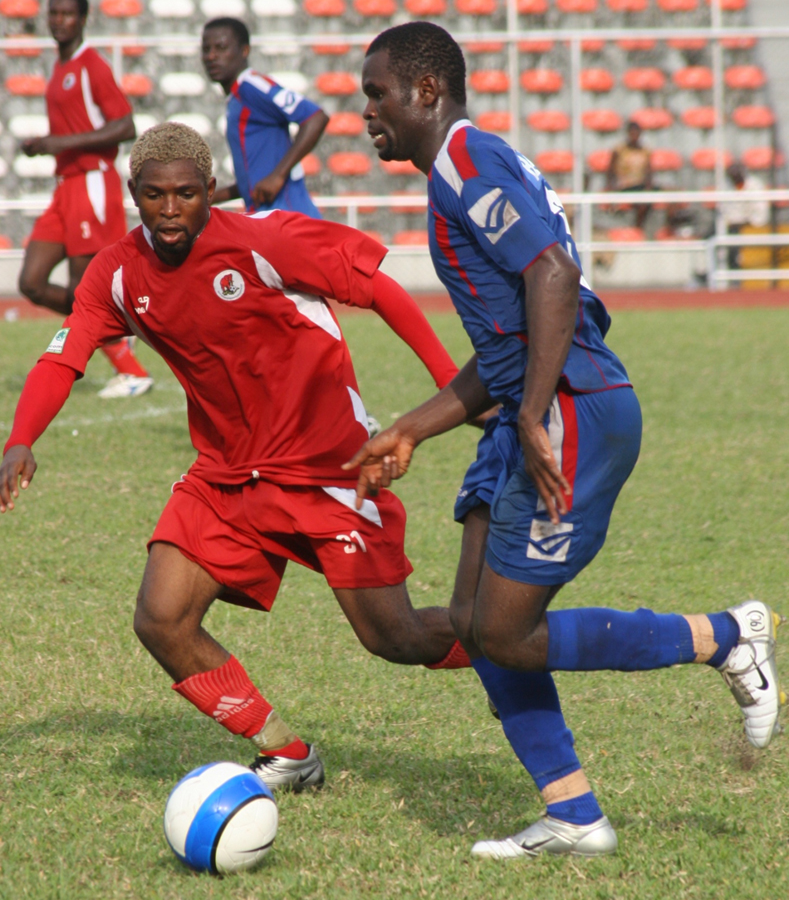

Personal information
- Full name: Peter Terna Suswam
- Date of birth: 5 September 1991 (age 35)
- Place of birth: Konshisha, Nigeria
- Height: 1.85 m (6 ft 1 in)
- Position: Right back

Team information
- Current team: Czarni Wierzbno
- Number: 5

Youth career
- SEC Abuja

Senior career*
Years	Team	Apps	(Gls)
2007–2009	Wikki Tourists	60	(0)
2009–2010	Lobi Stars	15	(0)
2010–2013	Vitória Setúbal	9	(0)
2014	FK Kukësi	4	(0)
2014–2016	Stal Rzeszów	57	(2)
2017	Enyimba		
2018	Plateau United		
2019–2021	Victoria Skarszew	26	(5)
2021–2024	Ostrovia Ostrów Wielkopolski	81	(4)
2024–2025	Victoria Ostrzeszów	12	(2)
2025–	Czarni Wierzbno	32	(11)

International career
2011	Nigeria U20	10	(1)
2011	Nigeria U23	5	(1)
2010	Nigeria	2	(0)
- * Club domestic league appearances and goals as of 22:49, 22 June 2026 (UTC)

Peter Terna Suswam (born 5 September 1991) is a Nigerian footballer who plays as a right-back for Polish club Czarni Wierzbno.

== Club career ==
Born in Konshisha, Suswam began his senior career at the age of 16 with Wikki Tourists FC. In 2009, after two seasons, he was sold to fellow Nigeria Premier League team Lobi Stars FC.

In the 2010 offseason, Suswam moved abroad and signed with Vitória FC, appearing rarely for the Setúbal-based club over the course of three Primeira Liga campaigns. In late 2013, he trialed for Georgian side FC Guria Lanchkhuti, but left after failing to agree to the economic terms.

== International career ==
Suswam was called up to the Nigeria camp prior to the 2010 FIFA World Cup in South Africa by coach Lars Lagerbäck, after helping the national under-20 team win the 2010 WAFU Nations Cup. He made his debut on 25 May against Saudi Arabia, but did not make the final cut.

In 2011, Suswam played all the games and minutes with the under-20s in the FIFA World Cup held in Colombia, scoring in a 5–2 group stage win against Croatia as the Super Eagles eventually reached the quarter-finals.

== Honours ==
Stal Rzeszów

- III liga Lublin–Subcarpathia: 2014–15

Victoria Skarszew

- Regional league Greater Poland I: 2019–20

Ostrovia Ostrów Wielkopolski

- V liga Greater Poland III: 2022–23

Nigeria U20

- African U-20 Championship: 2011
