= Kim Kyung-jung =

South Korean footballer (born 1991)

Kim Kyung-Jung 김경중
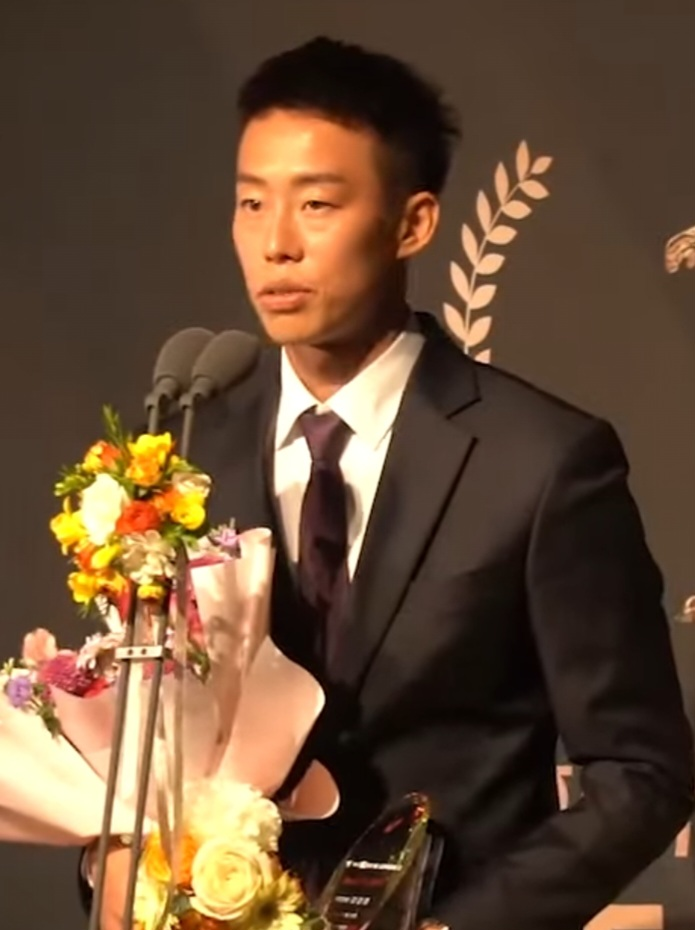
- Kim Kyung-Jung

Personal information
- Full name: Kim Kyung-Jung
- Date of birth: 16 April 1991 (age 35)
- Place of birth: Gwangju, South Korea
- Height: 1.78 m (5 ft 10 in)
- Positions: Winger; striker

Team information
- Current team: Suwon Samsung Bluewings
- Number: 17

Youth career
- 2010–2011: Korea University

Senior career*
| Years | Team | Apps | (Gls) |
| 2012–2015 | Olympic Tallinn | 0 | (0) |
| 2012 | → Bordeaux (loan) | 0 | (0) |
| 2012 | → Bordeaux II (loan) | 10 | (1) |
| 2013–2014 | → SM Caen (loan) | 14 | (0) |
| 2014–2015 | → Al Rayyan SC (loan) | 0 | (0) |
| 2015–2016 | Tokushima Vortis | 20 | (0) |
| 2017–2020 | Gangwon FC | 52 | (4) |
| 2018–2019 | → Sangju Sangmu (army) | 23 | (2) |
| 2021–2022 | FC Anyang | 51 | (13) |
| 2023– | Suwon Samsung Bluewings | 15 | (2) |

International career^{‡}
| 2009–2011 | South Korea U-20 | 21 | (3) |
| 2011–2014 | South Korea U-23 | 8 | (1) |
- * Club domestic league appearances and goals as of 6 October 2022 ‡ National team caps and goals as of 1 January 2018

Kim Kyung-Jung (Korean: 김경중; born 16 April 1991) is a South Korean association football player who currently plays for Suwon Samsung Bluewings as a striker. He had represented the South Korea national under-20 football team and participated in the 2011 FIFA U-20 World Cup.

== Career ==
=== Girondins de Bordeaux ===
Kim joined French Ligue 1 outfit Girondins de Bordeaux on a loan deal until the end of the 2011–12 season.

== International career ==
Kim has participated in the 2011 U-20 World Cup. On 30 July 2011, Kim scored his first goal against Mali U-20 team in the group stage.
