= Martin Ndtoungou =

Cameroonian association football coach (born 1958)

Martin Ndtongou Mpile (born 6 January 1958 in Cameroon) is a Cameroonian football coach. He was the coach of the Cameroonian Olympic team in the 2008 Summer Olympics.
