= 2011 FIFA U-20 World Cup =

Copa Mundial Sub-20 de la FIFA Colombia 2011

Tournament details
- Host country: Colombia
- Dates: 29 July – 20 August
- Teams: 24 (from 6 confederations)
- Venues: 8 (in 8 host cities)

Final positions
- Champions: Brazil (5th title)
- Runners-up: Portugal
- Third place: Mexico
- Fourth place: France

Tournament statistics
- Matches played: 52
- Goals scored: 132 (2.54 per match)
- Attendance: 1,309,929 (25,191 per match)
- Top scorer(s): (Brazil) Henrique (France) Alexandre Lacazette (Spain) Álvaro Vázquez (5 goals each)
- Best player: (Brazil) Henrique
- Best goalkeeper: (Portugal) Mika
- Fair play award: Nigeria

The 2011 FIFA U-20 World Cup was the 18th FIFA U-20 World Cup. Colombia hosted the tournament between 29 July and 20 August 2011, with matches being played in eight cities. The tournament was won by Brazil who claimed their fifth title.

At a FIFA Executive Committee meeting held in Sydney on 26 May 2008, Colombia beat the only other candidate country, Venezuela, for the right to organize the U-20 World Cup. It was suggested by the then-Vice President of Colombia Francisco Santos Calderón that it was needed to withdraw from the race with Brazil to host the 2014 FIFA World Cup so the nation could concentrate on hosting the "best possible games".

In an inspection tour of development works in March 2010, Jack Warner, then the vice president of FIFA, said that the completion of this tournament could provide Colombia with a launch pad to become a possible host for the 2026 World Cup. The official song of the tournament was "Nuestra Fiesta" by Colombian singer Jorge Celedón.

== Venues ==
The venues that were confirmed on 29 September 2010 are located in Bogotá, Cali, Medellín, Manizales, Armenia, Cartagena, Pereira and Barranquilla.

During an announcement about the ticketing procedures for Colombian residents, it was confirmed that the opening game would be held at the Estadio Metropolitano Roberto Meléndez in Barranquilla, with the Estadio El Campín hosting the final match.

Armenia	Barranquilla	Bogotá	Cali
Estadio Centenario	Estadio Metropolitano Roberto Meléndez	Estadio Nemesio Camacho (El Campín)	Estadio Pascual Guerrero
Capacity: 20,716	Capacity: 44,569	Capacity: 36,343	Capacity: 33,130
04°30′56″N 75°41′56″W	10°55′37″N 74°48′03″W	04°38′46″N 74°04′39″W	03°25′48″N 76°32′28″W
Cartagena	Location of the host cities of the 2011 FIFA U-20 World Cup.		Manizales
Estadio Jaime Morón León	Location of the host cities of the 2011 FIFA U-20 World Cup.		Estadio Palogrande
Capacity: 16,068	Location of the host cities of the 2011 FIFA U-20 World Cup.		Capacity: 28,678
10°24′20″N 75°29′54″W	Location of the host cities of the 2011 FIFA U-20 World Cup.		05°03′22″N 75°29′23″W
Medellín	Location of the host cities of the 2011 FIFA U-20 World Cup.		Pereira
Estadio Atanasio Girardot	Location of the host cities of the 2011 FIFA U-20 World Cup.		Estadio Hernán Ramírez Villegas
Capacity: 40,943	Location of the host cities of the 2011 FIFA U-20 World Cup.		Capacity: 30,297
06°15′25″N 75°35′25″W	Location of the host cities of the 2011 FIFA U-20 World Cup.		04°48′17″N 75°45′08″W
Estadio Atanasio Girardot-Medellín	Location of the host cities of the 2011 FIFA U-20 World Cup.		

== Participating teams and officials ==
=== Qualification ===
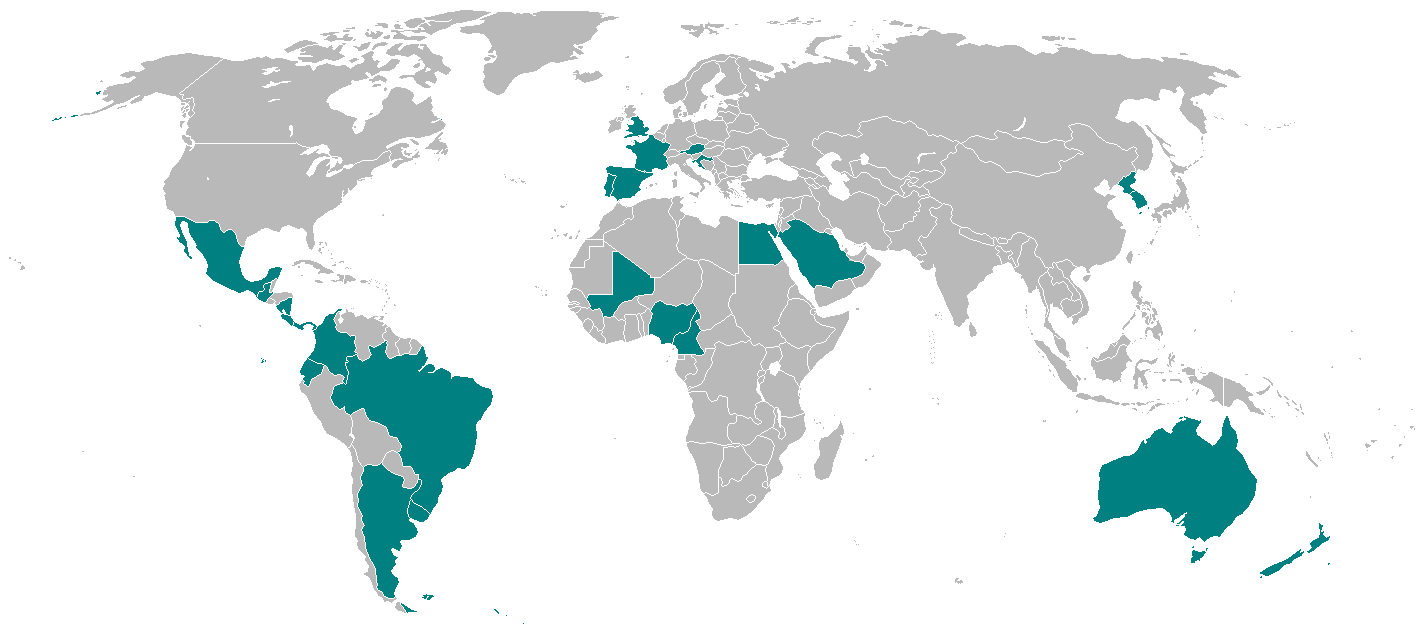
Qualified teams

In addition to host nation Colombia, 23 nations qualified from six separate continental competitions.

Confederation	Qualifying Tournament	Qualifier(s)
AFC (Asia)	2010 AFC U-19 Championship	Australia; North Korea; Saudi Arabia; South Korea
CAF (Africa)	2011 African Youth Championship	Cameroon; Egypt; Mali; Nigeria
CONCACAF (North, Central America & Caribbean)	2011 CONCACAF U-20 Championship	Costa Rica; Guatemala^{1} Mexico; Panama
CONMEBOL (South America)	Host nation	Colombia
CONMEBOL (South America)	2011 South American U-20 Championship	Argentina; Brazil; Ecuador; Uruguay
OFC (Oceania)	2011 OFC U-20 Championship	New Zealand
UEFA (Europe)	2010 UEFA European Under-19 Championship	Austria; Croatia; England; France; Portugal; Spain

1.Teams that made their debut.

=== Match officials ===
Confederation	Referee	Assistants
AFC	Kim Dong-Jin (South Korea)	Lee Jung-Min (South Korea); Yang Byoung-Eun (South Korea)
AFC	Abdulrahman Abdou (Qatar)	Mohammad Dharman (Qatar); Fares Al Shammari (Kuwait)
CAF	Djamel Haimoudi (Algeria)	Ayman Degaish (Egypt); Foaad El Maghrabi (Libya)
CAF	Noumandiez Doué (Ivory Coast)	Mohsen Ben Salem (Tunisia); Jean-Claude Birumushahu (Burundi)
CONCACAF	Walter López (Guatemala)	Gerson López (Guatemala); Hermenerito Leal (Guatemala)
CONCACAF	Mark Geiger (United States)	Mark Hurd (United States); Joe Fletcher (Canada)
CONMEBOL	Wilson Seneme (Brazil)	Alessandro Rocha (Brazil); Emerson de Carvalho (Brazil)
CONMEBOL	Hernando Buitrago (Colombia)	Wilson Berrio (Colombia); Eduardo Díaz (Colombia)
CONMEBOL	Antonio Arias (Paraguay)	Rodney Aquino (Paraguay); Milciades Salvidar (Paraguay)
CONMEBOL	Darío Ubriaco (Uruguay)	Carlos Pastorino (Uruguay); William Casavieja (Uruguay)
OFC	Peter O'Leary (New Zealand)	Jackson Namo (Solomon Islands); Ravinesh Kumar (Fiji)
UEFA	Robert Schörgenhofer (Austria)	Alain Hoxha (Austria); Mario Strudl (Austria)
UEFA	Mark Clattenburg (England)	Simon Beck (England); Stephen Child (England)
UEFA	István Vad (Hungary)	György Ring (Hungary); Zsolt Szpisják (Hungary)
UEFA	William Collum (Scotland)	Graham Chambers (Scotland); Martin Cryans (Scotland)
UEFA	Markus Strömbergsson (Sweden)	Magnus Sjöblom (Sweden); Fredrik Nilsson (Sweden)
UEFA	Cüneyt Çakır (Turkey)	Bahattin Duran (Turkey); Tarık Ongun (Turkey)

== Group stage ==
The draw for the group stage was held on 27 April 2011, at the Julio Cesar Turbay Ayala Convention Centre in Cartagena. The seedings were as follows.

Pot A	Pot B	Pot C	Pot D
Argentina; Brazil; Colombia; Nigeria; Portugal; Spain	Cameroon; Costa Rica; Egypt; Guatemala; Mali; Mexico	Australia; New Zealand; North Korea; Panama; Saudi Arabia; South Korea	Austria; Croatia; Ecuador; England; France; Uruguay

The winners and runners-up from each group, as well as the best four third-placed teams, will qualify for the first round of the knockout stage (round of 16).

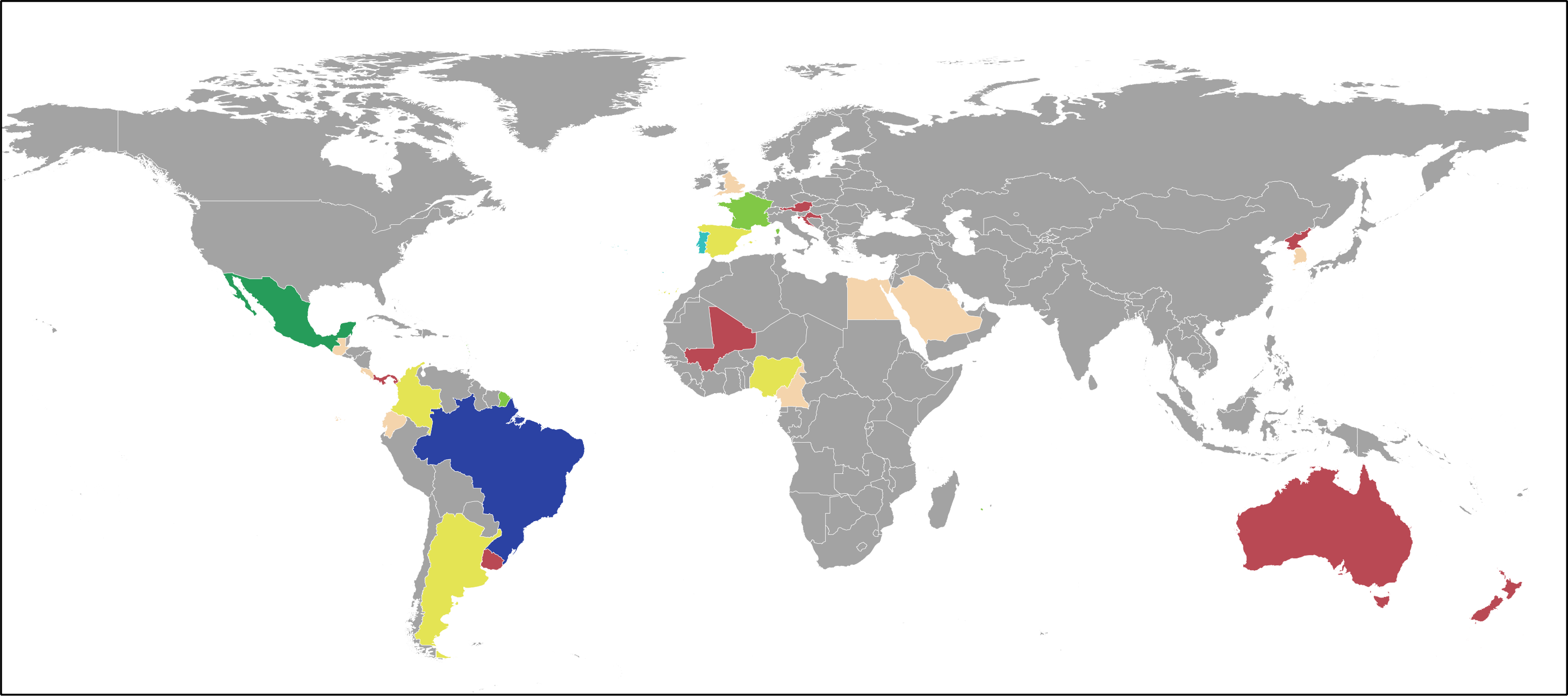
Champion Runner-up Third place Fourth place Quarter-finals Round of 16 Group stage

Tie-breaking criteria

Where two or more teams end the group stage with the same number of points, their ranking is determined by the following criteria:

1. goal difference in all group matches;
2. number of goals scored in all group matches;
3. points earned in the matches between the teams concerned;
4. goal difference in the matches between the teams concerned;
5. number of goals scored in the group matches between the teams concerned;
6. drawing of lots by the organising committee.

Ranking of third place teams in each group are determined by the following criteria, top four advances to the round of 16:

1. number of points
2. goal difference in all group matches;
3. number of goals scored in all group matches;
4. drawing of lots by the organising committee.

All times are in local, Colombia Time (UTC−05:00).

=== Group A ===
Pos	Team	Pld	W	D	L	GF	GA	GD	Pts	Group stage result
1	Colombia (H)	3	3	0	0	7	1	+6	9	Advance to knockout stage
2	France	3	2	0	1	6	5	+1	6	Advance to knockout stage
3	South Korea	3	1	0	2	3	4	−1	3	Advance to knockout stage
4	Mali	3	0	0	3	0	6	−6	0	

(H) Hosts
30 July 2011
18:00

Mali	0–2	South Korea
	Report	Kim Kyung-jung 50'; Jang Hyun-soo 80' (pen.)

Estadio Nemesio Camacho (El Campín), Bogotá
Attendance: 36,111
Referee: Mark Clattenburg (England)

30 July 2011
21:00

Colombia	4–1	France
Rodríguez 30' (pen.); Muriel 48', 66'; Arias 64'	Report	Sunu 21'

Estadio Nemesio Camacho (El Campín), Bogotá
Attendance: 36,111
Referee: Peter O'Leary (New Zealand)

2 August 2011
17:00

France	3–1	South Korea
Sunu 27'; Fofana 81'; Lacazette 90+1'	Report	Kim Young-uk 59'

Estadio Nemesio Camacho (El Campín), Bogotá
Attendance: 36,103
Referee: Wilson Seneme (Brazil)

2 August 2011
20:00

Colombia	2–0	Mali
Valencia 23'; Rodríguez 90+1'	Report

Estadio Nemesio Camacho (El Campín), Bogotá
Attendance: 36,103
Referee: Istvan Vad (Hungary)

5 August 2011
20:00

France	2–0	Mali
Bakambu 70'; Lacazette 77'	Report

Estadio Pascual Guerrero, Cali
Attendance: 31,395
Referee: Antonio Arias (Paraguay)

5 August 2011
20:00

Colombia	1–0	South Korea
Muriel 37'	Report

Estadio Nemesio Camacho (El Campín), Bogotá
Attendance: 36,082
Referee: Markus Strömbergsson (Sweden)

=== Group B ===
Pos	Team	Pld	W	D	L	GF	GA	GD	Pts	Group stage result
1	Portugal	3	2	1	0	2	0	+2	7	Advance to knockout stage
2	Cameroon	3	1	1	1	2	2	0	4	Advance to knockout stage
3	New Zealand	3	0	2	1	2	3	−1	2	
4	Uruguay	3	0	2	1	1	2	−1	2	

30 July 2011
17:00

Cameroon	1–1	New Zealand
Mbondi 33'	Report	Leuko 40' (o.g.)

Estadio Pascual Guerrero, Cali
Attendance: 35,262
Referee: William Collum (Scotland)

30 July 2011
20:00

Portugal	0–0	Uruguay
	Report

Estadio Pascual Guerrero, Cali
Attendance: 35,262
Referee: Abdulrahman Abdou (Qatar)

2 August 2011
17:00

Uruguay	1–1	New Zealand
Luna 74'	Report	Bevin 57'

Estadio Pascual Guerrero, Cali
Attendance: 28,884
Referee: Cüneyt Çakır (Turkey)

2 August 2011
20:00

Portugal	1–0	Cameroon
N. Oliveira 18'	Report

Estadio Pascual Guerrero, Cali
Attendance: 28,884
Referee: Antonio Arias (Paraguay)

5 August 2011
17:00

Portugal	1–0	New Zealand
Rui 31'	Report

Estadio Pascual Guerrero, Cali
Attendance: 31,395
Referee: Kim Dong-jin (South Korea)

5 August 2011
17:00

Uruguay	0–1	Cameroon
	Report	Mbongo 28'

Estadio Nemesio Camacho (El Campín), Bogotá
Attendance: 36,082
Referee: Mark Geiger (United States)

=== Group C ===
Pos	Team	Pld	W	D	L	GF	GA	GD	Pts	Group stage result
1	Spain	3	3	0	0	11	2	+9	9	Advance to knockout stage
2	Ecuador	3	1	1	1	4	3	+1	4	Advance to knockout stage
3	Costa Rica	3	1	0	2	4	9	−5	3	Advance to knockout stage
4	Australia	3	0	1	2	4	9	−5	1	

31 July 2011
15:00

Costa Rica	1–4	Spain
Ruiz 65'	Report	Rodrigo 14', 48'; Koke 81'; Isco 90+4' (pen.)

Estadio Palogrande, Manizales
Attendance: 17,075
Referee: Darío Ubriaco (Uruguay)

31 July 2011
18:00

Australia	1–1	Ecuador
Oar 89'	Report	Govea 24'

Estadio Palogrande, Manizales
Attendance: 17,075
Referee: Djamel Haimoudi (Algeria)

3 August 2011
17:00

Ecuador	0–2	Spain
	Report	Canales 67'; Vázquez 85'

Estadio Palogrande, Manizales
Attendance: 10,130
Referee: Peter O'Leary (New Zealand)

3 August 2011
20:00

Australia	2–3	Costa Rica
Oar 26'; Calvo 64' (o.g.)	Report	Campbell 22', 27'; Ruiz 72'

Estadio Palogrande, Manizales
Attendance: 10,130
Referee: Robert Schörgenhofer (Austria)

6 August 2011
17:00

Ecuador	3–0	Costa Rica
Montaño 2'; De Jesús 13', 69'	Report

Estadio Hernán Ramírez Villegas, Pereira
Attendance: 13,714
Referee: Cüneyt Çakır (Turkey)

6 August 2011
17:00

Australia	1–5	Spain
Bulut 27'	Report	Roberto 1'; Vázquez 6', 13', 18'; Canales 31' (pen.)

Estadio Palogrande, Manizales
Attendance: 14,722
Referee: Wilson Seneme (Brazil)

=== Group D ===
Pos	Team	Pld	W	D	L	GF	GA	GD	Pts	Group stage result
1	Nigeria	3	3	0	0	12	2	+10	9	Advance to knockout stage
2	Saudi Arabia	3	2	0	1	8	2	+6	6	Advance to knockout stage
3	Guatemala	3	1	0	2	1	11	−10	3	Advance to knockout stage
4	Croatia	3	0	0	3	2	8	−6	0	

31 July 2011
15:00

Nigeria	5–0	Guatemala
Egbedi 8', 39'; Ajagun 47'; Kayode 53'; Musa 76'	Report

Estadio Centenario, Armenia
Attendance: 11,116
Referee: Robert Schörgenhofer (Austria)

31 July 2011
18:00

Croatia	0–2	Saudi Arabia
	Report	Al-Fahmi 54'; Al-Muwallad 69'

Estadio Centenario, Armenia
Attendance: 11,116
Referee: Noumandiez Doué (Ivory Coast)

3 August 2011
17:00

Saudi Arabia	6–0	Guatemala
Dagriri 17'; Al-Fahmi 27'; Al-Fatil 58'; Al-Shahrani 66'; Al-Ibrahim 83'; Al-Dawsari 89'	Report

Estadio Centenario, Armenia
Attendance: 8,861
Referee: William Collum (Scotland)

3 August 2011
20:00

Croatia	2–5	Nigeria
Lendrić 42'; Kramarić 66'	Report	Kayode 25'; Suswam 30'; Musa 62'; Nwofor 69', 73'

Estadio Centenario, Armenia
Attendance: 8,861
Referee: Darío Ubriaco (Uruguay)

6 August 2011
20:00

Saudi Arabia	0–2	Nigeria
	Report	Musa 45+2'; Kayode 85'

Estadio Hernán Ramírez Villegas, Pereira
Attendance: 13,714
Referee: Hernando Buitrago (Colombia)

6 August 2011
20:00

Croatia	0–1	Guatemala
	Report	Ceballos 81'

Estadio Centenario, Armenia
Attendance: 4,209
Referee: Abdulrahman Abdou (Qatar)

=== Group E ===
Pos	Team	Pld	W	D	L	GF	GA	GD	Pts	Group stage result
1	Brazil	3	2	1	0	8	1	+7	7	Advance to knockout stage
2	Egypt	3	2	1	0	6	1	+5	7	Advance to knockout stage
3	Panama	3	0	1	2	0	5	−5	1	
4	Austria	3	0	1	2	0	7	−7	1	

29 July 2011
17:30

Austria	0–0	Panama
	Report

Estadio Jaime Morón León, Cartagena
Attendance: 13,198
Referee: Antonio Arias (Paraguay)

29 July 2011
21:00

Brazil	1–1	Egypt
Danilo 12'	Report	Gaber 26'

Estadio Metropolitano Roberto Meléndez, Barranquilla
Attendance: 45,170
Referee: Cüneyt Çakır (Turkey)

1 August 2011
17:00

Egypt	1–0	Panama
Hegazi 67'	Report

Estadio Metropolitano Roberto Meléndez, Barranquilla
Attendance: 11,101
Referee: Kim Dong-jin (South Korea)

1 August 2011
20:00

Brazil	3–0	Austria
Henrique 37'; Coutinho 52' (pen.); Willian José 63'	Report

Estadio Metropolitano Roberto Meléndez, Barranquilla
Attendance: 11,101
Referee: Mark Geiger (United States)

4 August 2011
20:00

Brazil	4–0	Panama
Henrique 40'; Coutinho 45+1', 52'; Dudu 89'	Report

Estadio Metropolitano Roberto Meléndez, Barranquilla
Attendance: 16,513
Referee: Mark Clattenburg (England)

4 August 2011
20:00

Egypt	4–0	Austria
Ghazi 31'; Ibrahim 60', 62', 82'	Report

Estadio Jaime Morón León, Cartagena
Attendance: 16,042
Referee: Walter López (Guatemala)

=== Group F ===
Pos	Team	Pld	W	D	L	GF	GA	GD	Pts	Group stage result
1	Argentina	3	2	1	0	4	0	+4	7	Advance to knockout stage
2	Mexico	3	1	1	1	3	1	+2	4	Advance to knockout stage
3	England	3	0	3	0	0	0	0	3	Advance to knockout stage
4	North Korea	3	0	1	2	0	6	−6	1	

29 July 2011
14:30

England	0–0	North Korea
	Report

Estadio Atanasio Girardot, Medellín
Attendance: 25,995
Referee: Wilson Seneme (Brazil)

29 July 2011
17:30

Argentina	1–0	Mexico
Lamela 70'	Report

Estadio Atanasio Girardot, Medellín
Attendance: 25,995
Referee: István Vad (Hungary)

1 August 2011
17:00

Mexico	3–0	North Korea
Ri Yong-chol 45+1' (o.g.); Guarch 54'; De Buen 90+4'	Report

Estadio Atanasio Girardot, Medellín
Attendance: 40,704
Referee: Markus Strömbergsson (Sweden)

1 August 2011
20:00

Argentina	0–0	England
	Report

Estadio Atanasio Girardot, Medellín
Attendance: 40,704
Referee: Walter López (Guatemala)

4 August 2011
17:00

Mexico	0–0	England
	Report

Estadio Jaime Morón León, Cartagena
Attendance: 16,042
Referee: Djamel Haimoudi (Algeria)

4 August 2011
17:00

Argentina	3–0	North Korea
Ferreyra 36'; Villafáñez 84'; Cirigliano 90+5'	Report

Estadio Atanasio Girardot, Medellín
Attendance: 14,647
Referee: Noumandiez Doué (Ivory Coast)

=== Ranking of third-placed teams ===
Pos	Grp	Team	Pld	W	D	L	GF	GA	GD	Pts	Result
1	F	England	3	0	3	0	0	0	0	3	Advance to knockout stage
2	A	South Korea	3	1	0	2	3	4	−1	3	Advance to knockout stage
3	C	Costa Rica	3	1	0	2	4	9	−5	3	Advance to knockout stage
4	D	Guatemala	3	1	0	2	1	11	−10	3	Advance to knockout stage
5	B	New Zealand	3	0	2	1	2	3	−1	2	
6	E	Panama	3	0	1	2	0	5	−5	1	

== Knockout stage ==
Round of 16
10 August 2011 – Barranquilla
Brazil	3
Saudi Arabia	0
10 August 2011 – Manizales
Spain (p)	0 (7)
South Korea	0 (6)
9 August 2011 – Pereira
Cameroon	1 (0)
Mexico (p)	1 (3)
9 August 2011 – Bogotá
Colombia	3
Costa Rica	2
10 August 2011 – Cartagena
France	1
Ecuador	0
10 August 2011 – Armenia
Nigeria	1
England	0
9 August 2011 – Cali
Portugal	1
Guatemala	0
9 August 2011 – Medellín
Argentina	2
Egypt	1

Quarter-finals
14 August 2011 – Pereira
Brazil (p)	2 (4)
Spain	2 (2)
13 August 2011 – Bogotá
Mexico	3
Colombia	1
14 August 2011 – Cali
France (a.e.t.)	3
Nigeria	2
13 August 2011 – Cartagena
Portugal (p)	0 (5)
Argentina	0 (4)

Semi-finals
17 August 2011 – Pereira
Brazil	2
Mexico	0
17 August 2011 – Medellín
France	0
Portugal	2

Final
20 August 2011 – Bogotá
Brazil (a.e.t.)	3
Portugal	2
Third place
20 August 2011 – Bogotá
Mexico	3
France	1

=== Round of 16 ===
9 August 2011
17:00

Portugal	1–0	Guatemala
N. Oliveira 7' (pen.)	Report

Estadio Pascual Guerrero, Cali
Attendance: 34,264
Referee: Djamel Haimoudi (Algeria)

9 August 2011
17:00

Argentina	2–1	Egypt
Lamela 42' (pen.), 64' (pen.)	Report	Salah 70' (pen.)

Estadio Atanasio Girardot, Medellín
Attendance: 40,147
Referee: Markus Strömbergsson (Sweden)

9 August 2011
20:00

Cameroon	1–1 (a.e.t.)	Mexico
Ohandza 79'	Report	Orrantía 81'
Penalties
Ohandza (penalty missed); Nguessi (penalty missed); Mbondi (penalty missed)	0–3	(penalty scored) Torres; (penalty scored) Dávila; (penalty scored) Piñón

Estadio Hernán Ramírez Villegas, Pereira
Attendance: 21,744
Referee: Wilson Seneme (Brazil)

9 August 2011
20:00

Colombia	3–2	Costa Rica
Muriel 56'; Franco 79'; Rodríguez 90+3' (pen.)	Report	Ruiz 63'; Escoe 65'

Estadio Nemesio Camacho (El Campín), Bogotá
Attendance: 36,084
Referee: Mark Clattenburg (England)

10 August 2011
17:00

Nigeria	1–0	England
Egbedi 52'	Report

Estadio Centenario, Armenia
Attendance: 18,291
Referee: Antonio Arias (Paraguay)

10 August 2011
17:00

Spain	0–0 (a.e.t.)	South Korea
	Report
Penalties
Tello (penalty scored); Recio (penalty scored); Koke (penalty missed); Vázquez (penalty scored); Isco (penalty scored); Bartra (penalty scored); Amat (penalty scored); Romeu (penalty scored)	7–6	(penalty scored) Jung Seung-yong; (penalty scored) Nam Seung-woo; (penalty missed) Lee Ki-je; (penalty scored) Kim Jin-su; (penalty scored) Jang Hyun-soo; (penalty scored) Min Sang-gi; (penalty scored) Baek Sung-dong; (penalty missed) Kim Kyung-jung

Estadio Palogrande, Manizales
Attendance: 23,618
Referee: Mark Geiger (United States)

10 August 2011
20:00

Brazil	3–0	Saudi Arabia
Henrique 46'; Silva 69'; Dudu 86'	Report

Estadio Metropolitano Roberto Meléndez, Barranquilla
Attendance: 37,448
Referee: István Vad (Hungary)

10 August 2011
20:00

France	1–0	Ecuador
Griezmann 75'	Report

Estadio Jaime Morón León, Cartagena
Attendance: 15,958
Referee: Kim Dong-jin (South Korea)

=== Quarterfinals ===
13 August 2011
17:00

Portugal	0–0 (a.e.t.)	Argentina
	Report
Penalties
Reis (penalty scored); Pereira (penalty missed); Roderick (penalty missed); Lopes (penalty scored); N. Oliveira (penalty scored); Ferreira (penalty scored); S. Oliveira (penalty scored)	5–4	(penalty scored) Lamela; (penalty scored) Iturbe; (penalty scored) Nervo; (penalty missed) González Pirez; (penalty missed) Ruiz; (penalty scored) Vuletich; (penalty missed) Tagliafico

Estadio Jaime Morón León, Cartagena
Attendance: 15,946
Referee: Peter O'Leary (New Zealand)

13 August 2011
20:00

Mexico	3–1	Colombia
Torres 37' (pen.); Rivera 69', 88'	Report	Zapata 60'

Estadio Nemesio Camacho (El Campín), Bogotá
Attendance: 35,501
Referee: Cüneyt Çakır (Turkey)

14 August 2011
15:00

France	3–2 (a.e.t.)	Nigeria
Lacazette 50', 104'; Fofana 102'	Report	Ejike 90+3', 111'

Estadio Pascual Guerrero, Cali
Attendance: 33,007
Referee: Darío Ubriaco (Uruguay)

14 August 2011
18:00

Brazil	2–2 (a.e.t.)	Spain
Willian José 35'; Dudu 100'	Report	Rodrigo 57'; Vázquez 102'
Penalties
Casemiro (penalty scored); Danilo (penalty scored); Henrique (penalty scored); Dudu (penalty scored)	4–2	(penalty missed) Amat; (penalty scored) Sergi Roberto; (penalty scored) Bartra; (penalty missed) Vázquez

Estadio Hernán Ramírez Villegas, Pereira
Attendance: 29,318
Referee: Walter López (Guatemala)

=== Semifinals ===
17 August 2011
17:00

France	0–2	Portugal
	Report	Danilo 9'; N. Oliveira 40' (pen.)

Estadio Atanasio Girardot, Medellín
Attendance: 40,598
Referee: Cüneyt Çakır (Turkey)

17 August 2011
20:00

Brazil	2–0	Mexico
Henrique 80', 84'	Report

Estadio Hernán Ramírez Villegas, Pereira
Attendance: 29,812
Referee: Mark Clattenburg (England)

=== Third place match ===
20 August 2011
17:00

Mexico	3–1	France
Dávila 12'; Enríquez 49'; Rivera 71'	Report	Lacazette 8'

Estadio Nemesio Camacho (El Campín), Bogotá
Attendance: 36,085
Referee: Antonio Arias (Paraguay)

=== Final ===
20 August 2011
20:00

Brazil	3–2 (a.e.t.)	Portugal
Oscar 5', 78', 111'	Report	Alex 9'; N. Oliveira 59'

Estadio Nemesio Camacho (El Campín), Bogotá
Attendance: 36,058
Referee: Mark Geiger (United States)

Brazil	Portugal

2011 FIFA U-20 World Cup Winners

Brazil
5th title

== Statistics ==
=== Goalscorers ===
With five goals, Henrique, Alexandre Lacazette and Álvaro Vázquez are the top scorers in the tournament. In total, 132 goals were scored by 80 different players, with three of them credited as own goals.

5 goals

- (Brazil) Henrique
- (France) Alexandre Lacazette
- (Spain) Álvaro Vázquez

4 goals

- (Colombia) Luis Muriel
- (Portugal) Nélson Oliveira

3 goals

- (Argentina) Erik Lamela
- (Brazil) Philippe Coutinho
- (Brazil) Dudu
- (Brazil) Oscar
- (Colombia) James Rodríguez
- (Costa Rica) John Jairo Ruiz
- (Egypt) Mohamed Ibrahim
- (Mexico) Edson Rivera
- (Nigeria) Edafe Egbedi
- (Nigeria) Olarenwaju Kayode
- (Nigeria) Ahmed Musa
- (Spain) Rodrigo

2 goals

- (Australia) Thomas Oar
- (Brazil) Willian José
- (Costa Rica) Joel Campbell
- (Ecuador) Marlon de Jesús
- (France) Gueïda Fofana
- (France) Gilles Sunu
- (Nigeria) Bright Ejike
- (Nigeria) Uche Nwofor
- (Saudi Arabia) Yasir Al-Fahmi
- (Spain) Sergio Canales

1 goal

- (Argentina) Ezequiel Cirigliano
- (Argentina) Facundo Ferreyra
- (Argentina) Lucas Villafáñez
- (Australia) Kerem Bulut
- (Brazil) Danilo
- (Brazil) Gabriel Silva
- (Cameroon) Christ Mbondi
- (Cameroon) Emmanuel Mbongo
- (Cameroon) Frank Ohandza
- (Colombia) Santiago Arias
- (Colombia) Pedro Franco
- (Colombia) José Adolfo Valencia
- (Colombia) Duván Zapata
- (Costa Rica) Javier Escoe
- (Croatia) Andrej Kramarić
- (Croatia) Ivan Lendrić
- (Ecuador) Juan Govea
- (Ecuador) Edson Montaño
- (Egypt) Omar Gaber
- (Egypt) Ahmed Hegazy
- (Egypt) Mohamed Salah
- (Egypt) Mohamed Sobhi
- (France) Cédric Bakambu
- (France) Antoine Griezmann
- (Guatemala) Marvin Ceballos
- (Mexico) Ulises Dávila
- (Mexico) Diego de Buen
- (Mexico) Jorge Enríquez
- (Mexico) Taufic Guarch
- (Mexico) Carlos Emilio Orrantía
- (Mexico) Erick Torres Padilla
- (New Zealand) Andrew Bevin
- (Nigeria) Abdul Jeleel Ajagun
- (Nigeria) Terna Suswam
- (Portugal) Alex
- (Portugal) Danilo Pereira
- (Portugal) Mário Rui
- (Saudi Arabia) Salem Al-Dawsari
- (Saudi Arabia) Mohammed Al-Fatil
- (Saudi Arabia) Ibrahim Al-Ibrahim
- (Saudi Arabia) Fahad Al-Muwallad
- (Saudi Arabia) Yasser Al-Shahrani
- (Saudi Arabia) Yahya Dagriri
- (South Korea) Jang Hyun-soo
- (South Korea) Kim Kyung-jung
- (South Korea) Kim Young-uk
- (Spain) Isco
- (Spain) Koke
- (Spain) Sergi Roberto
- (Uruguay) Adrián Luna

1 own goal

- (Cameroon) Tchaha Leouko (playing against New Zealand)
- (Costa Rica) Francisco Calvo (playing against Australia)
- (North Korea) Ri Yong-chol (playing against Mexico)

=== Final ranking ===
Pos	Team	Pld	W	D	L	GF	GA	GD	Pts	Final result
1	Brazil	7	5	2	0	18	5	+13	17	Champions
2	Portugal	7	4	2	1	7	3	+4	14	Runners-up
3	Mexico	7	3	2	2	10	6	+4	11	Third place
4	France	7	4	0	3	11	12	−1	12	Fourth place
5	Nigeria	5	4	0	1	15	5	+10	12	Eliminated in Quarter-finals
6	Colombia (H)	5	4	0	1	11	6	+5	12	Eliminated in Quarter-finals
7	Spain	5	3	2	0	13	4	+9	11	Eliminated in Quarter-finals
8	Argentina	5	3	2	0	6	1	+5	11	Eliminated in Quarter-finals
9	Egypt	4	2	1	1	7	3	+4	7	Eliminated in Round of 16
10	Saudi Arabia	4	2	0	2	8	5	+3	6	Eliminated in Round of 16
11	Cameroon	4	1	2	1	3	3	0	5	Eliminated in Round of 16
12	Ecuador	4	1	1	2	4	4	0	4	Eliminated in Round of 16
13	South Korea	4	1	1	2	3	4	−1	4	Eliminated in Round of 16
14	England	4	0	3	1	0	1	−1	3	Eliminated in Round of 16
15	Costa Rica	4	1	0	3	6	12	−6	3	Eliminated in Round of 16
16	Guatemala	4	1	0	3	1	12	−11	3	Eliminated in Round of 16
17	New Zealand	3	0	2	1	2	3	−1	2	Eliminated in Group stage
18	Uruguay	3	0	2	1	1	2	−1	2	Eliminated in Group stage
19	Australia	3	0	1	2	4	9	−5	1	Eliminated in Group stage
20	Panama	3	0	1	2	0	5	−5	1	Eliminated in Group stage
21	North Korea	3	0	1	2	0	6	−6	1	Eliminated in Group stage
22	Austria	3	0	1	2	0	7	−7	1	Eliminated in Group stage
23	Croatia	3	0	0	3	2	8	−6	0	Eliminated in Group stage
24	Mali	3	0	0	3	0	6	−6	0	Eliminated in Group stage

Source: rsssf.com
(H) Hosts

=== Awards ===
The following awards were given:

Golden Ball	Silver Ball	Bronze Ball
(Brazil) Henrique	(Portugal) Nélson Oliveira	(Mexico) Jorge Enríquez
Golden Shoe	Silver Shoe	Bronze Shoe
(Brazil) Henrique	(Spain) Álvaro Vázquez	(France) Alexandre Lacazette
5 goals	5 goals	5 goals
Golden Glove
(Portugal) Mika
FIFA Fair Play Award
Nigeria

== Organization ==
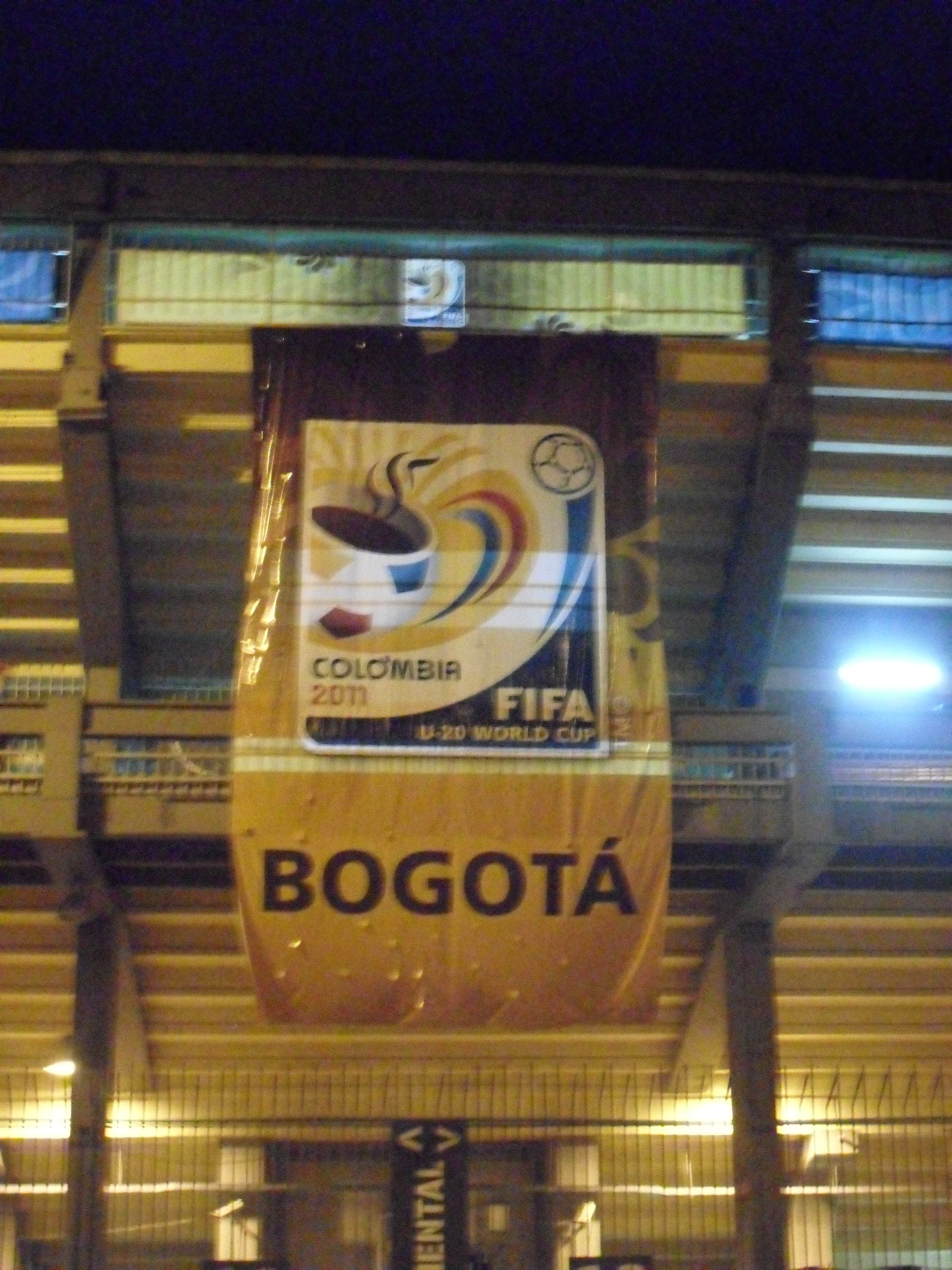
Banner at the Estadio Nemesio Camacho El Campín, Bogotá, promoting FIFA U-20 World Cup Colombia 2011

In late 2009 the Colombian Football Federation unveiled the budget for conducting the event, to be COP 150 billion (US$75 million). On 30 September 2009, the presidents of both FIFA and Colombia announced that the logo would show a steaming cup of coffee with the colours of the Colombian tricolour.

=== Opening ceremony ===
Prior to the start of the tournament, the Estadio Metropolitano Roberto Meléndez in Barranquilla hosted the Opening Ceremony, involving local musical performances and guests including Jorge Celedón, Barranquilla's Carnival Performers, Checo Acosta and Maía.

=== Closing ceremony ===
The Estadio El Campín in Bogotá hosted the Closing Ceremony. The show was managed by the Ibero-American Theater Festival and Teatro Nacional de Colombia and, like the opening ceremony, included musical performances.
