= 2009 South American U-17 Championship squads =

The 2009 South American Under-17 Football Championship was an international football tournament held in Chile from April 17, 2009 to May 9, 2009. The ten national teams involved in the tournament were required to register a squad of 20 players; only players in these squads are eligible to take part in the tournament. Each player had to have been born after January 1, 1992.

Players name marked in bold have been capped at full international level.

== Argentina ==
Head coach: José Luis Brown

No.	Pos.	Player	Date of birth (age)	Club
1	GK	**Emiliano Martínez**	2 September 1992 (aged 16)	(Argentine Football Association) Independiente
2	DF	Leandro González Pírez	26 February 1992 (aged 17)	(Argentine Football Association) River Plate
3	DF	Lucas Krupszky	6 April 1992 (aged 17)	(Argentine Football Association) Independiente
4	DF	Leandro Marín	22 January 1992 (aged 17)	(Argentine Football Association) Boca Juniors
5	MF	Jorge Balbuena	28 February 1992 (aged 17)	(Argentine Football Association) CA Lanús
6	DF	Esteban Espíndola	22 March 1992 (aged 17)	(Argentine Football Association) River Plate
7	MF	Ezequiel Cirigliano	24 January 1992 (aged 17)	(Argentine Football Association) River Plate
8	MF	Rodrigo Díaz	30 August 1992 (aged 16)	(Argentine Football Association) Argentinos Juniors
9	FW	Daniel Villalva	6 July 1992 (aged 16)	(Argentine Football Association) River Plate
10	MF	Sebastián González	4 March 1992 (aged 17)	(Argentine Football Association) San Lorenzo
11	FW	Sergio Araujo	28 January 1992 (aged 17)	(Argentine Football Association) Boca Juniors
12	GK	Ignacio Arce	8 April 1992 (aged 17)	(Argentine Football Association) Unión de Santa Fe
13	DF	**Nicolás Tagliafico**	31 August 1992 (aged 16)	(Argentine Football Association) CA Banfield
14	MF	Diego Martínez	1 January 1992 (aged 17)	(Argentine Football Association) River Plate
15	MF	Esteban Orfano	13 January 1992 (aged 17)	(Argentine Football Association) Boca Juniors
16	MF	Alexis Quintulén	21 May 1992 (aged 16)	(Portuguese Football Federation) Sporting Lisboa
17	DF	Benjamín Rosales	15 February 1992 (aged 17)	(Argentine Football Association) CA Lanús
18	MF	Gonzalo Olid Apaza	5 March 1992 (aged 17)	(Argentine Football Association) River Plate
19	MF	Matías Sosa	26 June 1992 (aged 16)	(Argentine Football Association) Estudiantes de La Plata
20	FW	Eduardo Rotondi	29 January 1992 (aged 17)	(Argentine Football Association) Argentinos Juniors

== Bolivia ==
Head coach: Óscar Villegas

No.	Pos.	Player	Date of birth (age)	Club
1	GK	Pedro Lusquiño	4 August 1992 (aged 16)	(Bolivian Football Federation) Callejas
2	DF	Rodrigo Borda	11 February 1992 (aged 17)	(Bolivian Football Federation) Aurora
3	DF	Alejandro Méndez	11 January 1992 (aged 17)	(Bolivian Football Federation) Callejas
4	DF	Carlos Mendoza	19 October 1992 (aged 16)	(Bolivian Football Federation) Vaca Diez
5	DF	Jorge Toco	13 January 1992 (aged 17)	(Bolivian Football Federation) Universitario de Sucre
6	MF	Diego Torrico	5 January 1992 (aged 17)	(Bolivian Football Federation) Blooming
7	MF	Diego Suárez	7 October 1992 (aged 16)	(Ukrainian Association of Football) Dínamo de Kiev
8	MF	**Ramiro Ballivian**	8 April 1992 (aged 17)	(Bolivian Football Federation) Universitario de Sucre
9	FW	**Gilbert Álvarez**	7 April 1992 (aged 17)	(Bolivian Football Federation) Callejas
10	MF	**Samuel Galindo**	18 April 1992 (aged 16)	(Bolivian Football Federation) Real América
11	MF	**Óscar Ribera**	11 February 1992 (aged 17)	(Bolivian Football Federation) Callejas
12	GK	**Romel Quiñónez**	25 June 1992 (aged 16)	(Bolivian Football Federation) Callejas
13	MF	Robert Silva	12 February 1994 (aged 15)	(Bolivian Football Federation) Florida
14	MF	**Leonel Justiniano**	2 July 1992 (aged 16)	(Bolivian Football Federation) Callejas
15	DF	Diego Vaca	2 February 1992 (aged 17)	(Bolivian Football Federation) Callejas
16	FW	Marco Rivero	14 February 1992 (aged 17)	(Bolivian Football Federation) Jorge Wilstermann
17	FW	Juan Pablo Peña	24 June 1992 (aged 16)	(Bolivian Football Federation) Vaca Diez
18	FW	Carlos Castro	8 September 1992 (aged 16)	(Bolivian Football Federation) Amboro
19	DF	Luis Salvatierra	30 January 1992 (aged 17)	(Bolivian Football Federation) Callejas
20	MF	Fran Parada	10 June 1992 (aged 16)	(Bolivian Football Federation) Vaca Diez

== Brazil ==
Head coach: Luiz Antônio Nizzo

No.	Pos.	Player	Date of birth (age)	Club
1	GK	**Ederson**	17 August 1993 (aged 15)	(Brazilian Football Confederation) São Paulo
2	DF	Crystian	10 June 1992 (aged 16)	(Brazilian Football Confederation) Santos
3	DF	Gerson Vieira	4 October 1992 (aged 16)	(Brazilian Football Confederation) Gremio Porto Alegre
4	DF	Sidimar	9 July 1992 (aged 16)	(Brazilian Football Confederation) Atletico Mineiro
5	MF	Elivélton	21 January 1992 (aged 17)	(Brazilian Football Confederation) Santos
6	DF	Dodô	6 February 1992 (aged 17)	(Brazilian Football Confederation) Corinthians
7	MF	Dudu	7 January 1992 (aged 17)	(Brazilian Football Confederation) Cruzeiro
8	MF	**João Pedro**	9 March 1992 (aged 17)	(Brazilian Football Confederation) Atletico Mineiro
9	FW	Willen	10 January 1992 (aged 17)	(Brazilian Football Confederation) Vasco Da Gama
10	MF	**Philippe Coutinho**	12 June 1992 (aged 16)	(Brazilian Football Confederation) Vasco Da Gama
11	MF	Wellington Nem	6 February 1992 (aged 17)	(Brazilian Football Confederation) Fluminense
12	GK	**Alisson**	2 October 1992 (aged 16)	(Brazilian Football Confederation) Internacional
13	DF	Romário	18 December 1993 (aged 15)	(Brazilian Football Confederation) Vitoria
14	FW	**Fabinho**	23 October 1992 (aged 16)	(Brazilian Football Confederation) Fluminense
15	DF	Leonardo Zanatta	7 May 1992 (aged 16)	(Brazilian Football Confederation) Internacional
16	MF	Zezinho	14 March 1992 (aged 17)	(Brazilian Football Confederation) Juventude
17	MF	**Fernando**	3 March 1992 (aged 17)	(Brazilian Football Confederation) Gremio Porto Alegre
18	DF	Guilherme Batata	2 May 1992 (aged 16)	(Brazilian Football Confederation) Atletico Paranaense
19	FW	Felipinho	29 January 1992 (aged 17)	(Brazilian Football Confederation) Internacional
20	FW	**Casemiro**	23 February 1992 (aged 17)	(Brazilian Football Confederation) São Paulo

== Chile ==
Head coach: César Vaccia

No.	Pos.	Player	Date of birth (age)	Club
1	GK	Leonardo Rayo	24 November 1992 (aged 16)	(Football Federation of Chile) Colo-Colo
2	DF	**Enzo Andía**	16 August 1992 (aged 16)	(Football Federation of Chile) Universidad Católica
3	DF	Matías Navarrete	23 May 1992 (aged 16)	(Football Federation of Chile) Unión Española
4	DF	David Villarroel	27 July 1992 (aged 16)	(Football Federation of Chile) Fernández Vial
5	DF	Mario Parra	9 January 1992 (aged 17)	(Football Federation of Chile) Palestino
6	MF	Claudio Sepúlveda	19 June 1992 (aged 16)	(Football Federation of Chile) Universidad Católica
7	MF	Gustavo Ramírez	22 May 1992 (aged 16)	(Football Federation of Chile) Colo-Colo
8	MF	Santiago Dittborn	30 October 1992 (aged 16)	(Football Federation of Chile) Universidad Católica
9	FW	**Álvaro Ramos**	14 April 1992 (aged 17)	(Football Federation of Chile) Municipal Iquique
10	MF	César Valenzuela	4 September 1992 (aged 16)	(Football Federation of Chile) Palestino
11	MF	Álex González	2 February 1992 (aged 17)	(Football Federation of Chile) Santiago Wanderers
12	GK	Darío Melo	24 March 1993 (aged 16)	(Football Federation of Chile) Palestino
13	DF	Pedro Salgado	6 November 1992 (aged 16)	(Football Federation of Chile) Universidad Católica
14	MF	José Fernández	23 May 1992 (aged 16)	(Football Federation of Chile) Colo-Colo
15	FW	Erick Mora	29 April 1992 (aged 16)	(Football Federation of Chile) Cobreloa
16	FW	Cristián Contreras	19 February 1992 (aged 17)	(Football Federation of Chile) Colo-Colo
17	FW	Frank Fernández	26 February 1992 (aged 17)	(Football Federation of Chile) Universidad Católica
18	MF	Camilo Peña	5 June 1992 (aged 16)	(Football Federation of Chile) Universidad Católica
19	DF	Jorge Aravena	24 August 1992 (aged 16)	(Football Federation of Chile) Colo-Colo
20	FW	**Matías Jadue**	16 May 1992 (aged 16)	(Football Federation of Chile) Universidad Católica

== Colombia ==
Head coach: Ramiro Viáfara

No.	Pos.	Player	Date of birth (age)	Club
1	GK	Cristian Bonilla	2 June 1993 (aged 15)	(Colombian Football Federation) Boyacá Chicó FC
2	DF	Juan David Díaz	10 October 1992 (aged 16)	(Colombian Football Federation) Deportivo Pasto
3	DF	Luis Fernando David	27 August 1992 (aged 16)	(Colombian Football Federation) LF Risaralda
4	DF	Jader David Romaña	26 June 1992 (aged 16)	(Colombian Football Federation) Bogotá FC
5	DF	Juan Camilo Saiz	1 March 1992 (aged 17)	(Colombian Football Federation) Envigado FC
6	DF	Jhojan Caicedo	30 September 1992 (aged 16)	(Colombian Football Federation) Boyacá Chicó FC
7	MF	Carlos Mario Castro	16 May 1992 (aged 16)	(Colombian Football Federation) Independiente Santa Fe
8	MF	**Gustavo Cuéllar**	14 October 1992 (aged 16)	(Colombian Football Federation) Deportivo Cali
9	FW	Faider Burbano	19 June 1992 (aged 16)	(Colombian Football Federation) Envigado FC
10	MF	**Edwin Cardona**	8 December 1992 (aged 16)	(Colombian Football Federation) Atlético Nacional
11	FW	Wilson Cuero	27 January 1992 (aged 17)	(Colombian Football Federation) Millonarios
12	GK	Andrés Salazar	12 March 1992 (aged 17)	(Colombian Football Federation) Academia FC
13	MF	Deiner Córdoba	21 April 1992 (aged 16)	(Colombian Football Federation) Deportivo Pereira
14	MF	Carlos Julio Robles	16 May 1992 (aged 16)	(Colombian Football Federation) Deportes Quindío
15	MF	José David Leudo	9 November 1993 (aged 15)	(Colombian Football Federation) Boyacá Chicó FC
16	FW	Jorge Luis Ramos	2 October 1992 (aged 16)	(Colombian Football Federation) Real Cartagena
17	DF	**Jeison Murillo**	30 November 1992 (aged 16)	(Colombian Football Federation) Juventud Soacha FC
18	FW	Christian Mafla	15 January 1993 (aged 16)	(Colombian Football Federation) LF Valle
19	MF	Arnol Palacios	8 June 1992 (aged 16)	(Colombian Football Federation) LF Valle
20	MF	**Stiven Mendoza**	27 June 1992 (aged 16)	(Colombian Football Federation) América de Cali

== Ecuador ==
Head coach: José Javier Rodríguez

No.	Pos.	Player	Date of birth (age)	Club
1	GK	Fredy Carcelén	9 April 1993 (aged 16)	(Ecuadorian Football Federation) El Nacional
2	DF	**Mario Pineida**	6 July 1992 (aged 16)	(Ecuadorian Football Federation) Brasilia
3	DF	Jorge Valencia	22 May 1992 (aged 16)	(Ecuadorian Football Federation) El Nacional
4	MF	Esteban Villaprado	21 February 1992 (aged 17)	(Ecuadorian Football Federation) LDU Portoviejo
5	DF	**Dennys Quiñónez**	12 March 1992 (aged 17)	(Ecuadorian Football Federation) Barcelona SC
6	MF	César Villacís	6 November 1992 (aged 16)	(Ecuadorian Football Federation) El Nacional
7	FW	Carlos Alava	26 August 1992 (aged 16)	(Ecuadorian Football Federation) Manta FC
8	DF	Yeison Ordóñez	15 March 1992 (aged 17)	(Ecuadorian Football Federation) Independiente José Terán
9	MF	Luis Celi	13 January 1992 (aged 17)	(Ecuadorian Football Federation) Universidad Católica
10	MF	Jonathan De La Cruz	18 July 1992 (aged 16)	(Ecuadorian Football Federation) Universidad Católica
11	FW	Richard Caicedo	13 December 1992 (aged 16)	(Ecuadorian Football Federation) Fedeguayas
12	DF	Johan Padilla	14 August 1992 (aged 16)	(Ecuadorian Football Federation) Panamá SC
13	FW	Jean De La Rosa	30 July 1992 (aged 16)	(Ecuadorian Football Federation) Emelec SC
14	MF	Kevin Tello	2 March 1992 (aged 17)	(Ecuadorian Football Federation) Emelec SC
15	MF	**Dixon Arroyo**	1 June 1992 (aged 16)	(Ecuadorian Football Federation) Norte América
16	MF	Jorge Chedraui	10 August 1992 (aged 16)	(Ecuadorian Football Federation) Emelec SC
17	GK	Edder Fuertes	27 March 1992 (aged 17)	(Ecuadorian Football Federation) El Nacional
18	DF	Ramiro Montesdeoca	20 November 1992 (aged 16)	(Ecuadorian Football Federation) LDU Portoviejo
19	FW	Roger Rentería	22 June 1992 (aged 16)	(Ecuadorian Football Federation) Emelec SC
20	FW	Marco Antonio Nazareno	19 March 1993 (aged 16)	(Ecuadorian Football Federation) Barcelona SC

== Paraguay ==
Head coach: Jorge Campos

No.	Pos.	Player	Date of birth (age)	Club
2	DF	Juan Antonio Benítez	16 February 1992 (aged 17)	(Paraguayan Football Association) Cerro Porteño
3	DF	Fernando Acuña	31 August 1992 (aged 16)	(Paraguayan Football Association) Libertad
4	DF	Claudio Estigarribia	7 March 1992 (aged 17)	(Paraguayan Football Association) Cerro Porteño
5	DF	Ángel Vera	25 February 1992 (aged 17)	(Paraguayan Football Association) Libertad
6	MF	**Gustavo Gómez**	6 May 1993 (aged 15)	(Paraguayan Football Association) 31 de Julio San Ignacio Misiones
7	MF	Juan José Franco	10 February 1992 (aged 17)	(Paraguayan Football Association) Cerro Porteño
8	MF	Jorge Velázquez	10 January 1992 (aged 17)	(Paraguayan Football Association) Libertad
9	FW	Epifanio García	2 July 1992 (aged 16)	(Paraguayan Football Association) Cerro Porteño
10	MF	Jorge Salinas	6 May 1992 (aged 16)	(Paraguayan Football Association) Libertad
11	MF	Félix Gómez	20 January 1992 (aged 17)	(Paraguayan Football Association) Guaraní
12	GK	Christian Villalba	20 March 1992 (aged 17)	(Paraguayan Football Association) Olimpia
13	DF	Blas Moroni	3 February 1992 (aged 17)	(Paraguayan Football Association) Rubio Ñu
14	DF	Danilo Ortiz	28 July 1992 (aged 16)	(Paraguayan Football Association) Cerro Porteño
15	MF	Julio Domínguez	7 April 1992 (aged 17)	(Paraguayan Football Association) Cerro Porteño
16	MF	David León	18 February 1993 (aged 16)	(Paraguayan Football Association) Olimpia
17	FW	Carlos Valiente	19 August 1992 (aged 16)	(Paraguayan Football Association) Sportivo Luqueño
18	MF	Diego Godoy	1 April 1992 (aged 17)	(Paraguayan Football Association) Cerro Porteño
19	MF	Federico Giménez	3 March 1992 (aged 17)	(Paraguayan Football Association) Sol de América
20	MF	Jorge Cañete	17 July 1992 (aged 16)	(Paraguayan Football Association) Olimpia

(N°1)Armando Andres Vera GK Libertad Paraguay 04/02/1993

== Peru ==
Head coach: Juan José Oré

No.	Pos.	Player	Date of birth (age)	Club
1	GK	Hugo Guevara	3 November 1992 (aged 16)	(Peruvian Football Federation) Universidad San Martín
2	DF	Daive Arriaga	7 October 1992 (aged 16)	(Peruvian Football Federation) Esther Grande de Bentín
3	DF	Pedro Diez	22 May 1992 (aged 16)	(Peruvian Football Federation) Universitario
4	DF	Anthony Castañón	22 March 1992 (aged 17)	(Peruvian Football Federation) Ciclista Lima
5	DF	Renato Zapata	16 February 1992 (aged 17)	(Peruvian Football Federation) Universitario
6	DF	Antonio Centeno	3 April 1992 (aged 17)	(Peruvian Football Federation) Universitario
7	FW	Johan Rey	28 February 1992 (aged 17)	(Peruvian Football Federation) Universitario
8	MF	Tarek Carranza	13 February 1992 (aged 17)	(Peruvian Football Federation) Sporting Cristal
9	FW	Helaman Chuy	13 July 1992 (aged 16)	(Peruvian Football Federation) Esther Grande de Bentín
10	MF	Deyair Reyes	4 March 1992 (aged 17)	(Peruvian Football Federation) Sporting Cristal
11	MF	Torre La Torre	26 May 1992 (aged 16)	(Peruvian Football Federation) Esther Grande de Bentín
12	GK	Armando Falcón	12 January 1992 (aged 17)	(Peruvian Football Federation) Sporting Cristal
13	DF	Carlos Lizarzaburu	9 January 1992 (aged 17)	(Peruvian Football Federation) Universidad San Martín
14	MF	Joazhiño Arroe	5 June 1992 (aged 16)	(Italian Football Federation) AC Siena
15	MF	Rodrigo Ríos	3 January 1992 (aged 17)	(Peruvian Football Federation) Ciclista Lima
16	MF	Jordan Ccapacca	5 March 1992 (aged 17)	(Peruvian Football Federation) Sporting Cristal
17	MF	César Mayuri	4 September 1992 (aged 16)	(Peruvian Football Federation) Academia Cantolao
18	DF	Diego Villanueva	21 May 1992 (aged 16)	(Peruvian Football Federation) Universitario
19	FW	Junior Chumbiray	22 July 1992 (aged 16)	(Peruvian Football Federation) Universidad San Martín
20	MF	Juan Ventura	28 February 1992 (aged 17)	(Peruvian Football Federation) Universitario America

== Uruguay ==
Head coach: Roland Marcenaro

No.	Pos.	Player	Date of birth (age)	Club
1	GK	Salvador Ichazo	26 January 1992 (aged 17)	(Uruguayan Football Association) Danubio
2	DF	Ramón Arias	27 July 1992 (aged 16)	(Uruguayan Football Association) Defensor Sporting
3	DF	Diego Polenta	6 February 1992 (aged 17)	(Italian Football Federation) Genoa
4	DF	Santiago Pereyra	2 June 1992 (aged 16)	(Uruguayan Football Association) Nacional
5	MF	Sebastián Rodríguez	16 August 1992 (aged 16)	(Uruguayan Football Association) Danubio
6	DF	Bruno Marchelli	1 July 1992 (aged 16)	(Uruguayan Football Association) Nacional
7	FW	Gonzalo Barreto	22 January 1992 (aged 17)	(Uruguayan Football Association) Danubio
8	MF	Ignacio Avilés	23 May 1992 (aged 16)	(Uruguayan Football Association) Danubio
9	FW	Adrián Luna	12 April 1992 (aged 17)	(Uruguayan Football Association) Defensor Sporting
10	MF	Sebastián Gallegos	18 January 1992 (aged 17)	(Uruguayan Football Association) Danubio
11	MF	José Bernardo Laureiro	2 February 1992 (aged 17)	(Uruguayan Football Association) Defensor Sporting
12	GK	Kevin Blanco	8 February 1992 (aged 17)	(Uruguayan Football Association) Nacional
13	DF	Rubén Silvera	4 January 1993 (aged 16)	(Uruguayan Football Association) Defensor Sporting
14	DF	Sebastián Sellanes	15 January 1992 (aged 17)	(Uruguayan Football Association) Nacional
15	MF	Nicolás Prieto	5 September 1992 (aged 16)	(Uruguayan Football Association) Nacional
16	MF	Luis Miguel De Los Santos	4 March 1993 (aged 16)	(Uruguayan Football Association) Danubio
17	MF	Jhon Pírez	20 February 1993 (aged 16)	(Uruguayan Football Association) Defensor Sporting
18	FW	Raúl Rivero	24 January 1992 (aged 17)	(Uruguayan Football Association) Defensor Sporting
19	FW	Santiago González	11 June 1992 (aged 16)	(Uruguayan Football Association) River Plate
20	FW	Nicolás Mezquida	21 January 1992 (aged 17)	(Uruguayan Football Association) Peñarol

== Venezuela ==
Head coach: Daniel de Oliveira

No.	Pos.	Player	Date of birth (age)	Club
1	GK	Jesús Escalona	15 February 1992 (aged 17)	(Venezuelan Football Federation) Unión Lara
2	MF	**Rómulo Otero**	11 September 1992 (aged 16)	(Venezuelan Football Federation) Caracas Futbol Club
3	DF	Carlos Rivero	27 November 1992 (aged 16)	(Venezuelan Football Federation) Hermandad Gallega de Valencia
4	DF	Jackson Clavijo	1 January 1992 (aged 17)	(Venezuelan Football Federation) Deportivo Táchira
5	DF	William Matos	17 January 1992 (aged 17)	(Venezuelan Football Federation) Caracas Futbol Club
6	MF	Yorman Suárez	26 April 1992 (aged 16)	(Venezuelan Football Federation) Caracas Futbol Club
7	FW	**Josef Martínez**	19 May 1993 (aged 15)	(Argentine Football Association) Estudiantes de La Plata
8	MF	**Alexander González**	13 September 1992 (aged 16)	(Venezuelan Football Federation) Caracas Futbol Club
9	FW	**Fernando Aristeguieta**	9 April 1992 (aged 17)	(Venezuelan Football Federation) Caracas Futbol Club
10	MF	Josimar Zambrano	12 June 1992 (aged 16)	(Venezuelan Football Federation) Deportivo Italia
11	FW	Luis Sadovnic	10 January 1993 (aged 16)	(Venezuelan Football Federation) San Agustín del Paraíso
12	GK	Carlos Villa	6 December 1992 (aged 16)	(Venezuelan Football Federation) Deportivo Italia
13	DF	Rafaelle Centofanti	21 March 1992 (aged 17)	(United States Soccer Federation) Miami Futbol Club
14	FW	Eliezer Padilla	17 February 1992 (aged 17)	(Venezuelan Football Federation) Pelicano Futbol Club
15	MF	Marco Lobo	11 August 1992 (aged 16)	(Venezuelan Football Federation) Deportivo Italia
16	DF	Alexander Valero	3 March 1992 (aged 17)	(Venezuelan Football Federation) Minervén
17	DF	Visnu Maharaj	31 January 1992 (aged 17)	(United States Soccer Federation) PSA Academy
18	MF	Manuel Medori	8 February 1992 (aged 17)	(Argentine Football Association) Deportivo Mac Allister
19	MF	Víctor Archila	18 August 1992 (aged 16)	(Venezuelan Football Federation) Hermandad Gallega de Valencia
20	MF	Juan González	28 February 1992 (aged 17)	(Royal Spanish Football Federation) Deportivo La Coruña
