= Barona (surname) =

Barona is a surname. Notable people with the surname include:

- David Barona (born 1989), Spanish cellist
- Fernando Callejas Barona (born 1948), Ecuadorian politician
- Jhonnier Montaño Barona (born 2004), Colombian footballer
- José Barona, Catholic priest and a Spanish missionary in California
- Mimi Barona (born 1991), Ecuadorian surfer

== See also ==
- Barona (disambiguation)
- Barone (surname)
