= Calleja =

Calleja is a surname found in Spain (as well as countries with people of Hispanic descent) and Malta. It is unclear whether the Maltese and Spanish surnames are related or a coincidence, perhaps caused by romanisation.

== Variations ==
Variations in spelling include:

- Calleia: Anglicized variation of Maltese surname
- Calleya: Variation found in Malta on documents dating from the 13th century to the 15th century, may be an Italianized variation.
- Callea: Also found in Italy, this variation also shows up on documents from Malta dating from the 15th century
- Callejas
- Kalleya

== Spain ==
In Spanish, Calleja can be translated to "narrow street" or "alley", but the Latin translation of Calleya is "skillfully". The surname is Castilian, originating in or around Ampuero in Cantabria, Spain.

== Malta ==
Based on historical evidence, the Maltese version of the surname is likely not related to the Spanish version. The first written appearance of the Calleja surname in Malta predates both Aragonese rule (1283–1412) and Aragonese/Castilian rule (1412–1530) of the Maltese island—appearing in 1271 AD with the spelling Calleya and Caleya.

On 22 May 1271, Bertrando de Real, the magister of Malta, was instructed to keep a note of the names and surnames of those who transported the falcons to the royal court from Malta; Martinus Calleya was a witness, and Leo Caleya is among those included in the list. Of note, the persons on the 1271 document belonged to the wealthy class and did not include any serfs or peasants, nor any surnames of Arabic derivation. One theory is that the surname Callea or Calleya in Malta is of late Greek or Byzantine formation—Commendatore Francesco Abela, the father of Maltese history, believed the surname to be of Greek origin.

In the fifteenth century, there was a village in Malta called Calleja, situated near Mosta—it seems linguistically and geographically connected with il-Qlejgħa, in the same geographic area. Wied il-Qlejgħa (more popularly known as Chadwick Lakes) means the Valley of the Small Castle.

Another place name in Malta is Il-Qlejgħa, on the Northwest coast. The nearest town to Il-Qlejgħa is Birkirkara, 11.4 km east, which has the highest concentration of people with the surname Calleja.

A hamlet by the name Hal Calleja is known to have existed in the vicinity of Mosta.

Mention of Hal Calleja in Malta based on militia rolls:

- 1419 militia roll: total 25 – Naxaru 2, Calleja /Musta 4, Atardu 1, Bircalcara 2, Capurat 3, Pasqualinu 1, Johanni /Buzubudi 2, Zurico 2, Rabat 6, Civitas 2
- 1480s militia roll: calleye (27), callea (1), total 28 – Naxar 2, Musta 4, Bercarcara 2, Curmi 7, Luca /Gudia 1, Zurric 2, Sigeui 4, Zebug 3, Rabat 2, Civitas 1

== Calleja may refer to ==
=== People ===
- Alfonso Callejas Deshón, Nicaraguan politician
- Andrés de la Calleja (1705–1785), Spanish painter
- Anthony Callea (born 1982), Australian pop singer of Italian descent
- Benjamín Callejas (born 1990), Chilean handball player
- Carlos Calleja (born 1976), Salvadoran businessman and former politician
- Carmen Calleja (1949–2012), Spanish politician
- Christian Callejas (born 1978), Uruguayan footballer
- Ethan Calleja (born 1999), Australian Artistic Swimmer
- Félix María Calleja del Rey, 1st Count of Calderón, Spanish 19th century military officer
- Fernando Callejas Barona (born 1948), Ecuadorian politician
- Gabi Calleja, Maltese gay rights activist
- Isacio Calleja (1936–2019), Spanish footballer
- Isidro Callejas (born 2004), Spanish racing driver
- Jaime Callejas (born 1940), Colombian sports shooter
- Javier Calleja (born 1978), Spanish football coach and former player
- José Díez Calleja (born 1962), Spanish footballer
- Joseph Calleia (1897–1975), Maltese-born American singer, composer, screenwriter and actor
- Joseph Calleja (born 1978), Maltese opera singer
- Joseph Michael Calleja (1974–2000), better known as Joe C., American rapper
- Juan Nicolás Callejas Arroyo (1944–2017), Mexican politician
- Kurt Calleja (born 1989), Maltese singer
- Luke Calleja, (born 1985) Australian DJ better known as Kronic
- Marcial Calleja (1863–1914), Filipino politician
- Oreste Calleja (born 1946), Maltese playwright
- Rafael Calleja (1870–1938), Spanish composer
- Rafael Leonardo Callejas Romero (1943–2020), former President of Honduras
- Sebastian Calleja (born 1998), Maltese singer
- Sebastián Calleja (born 1979), Argentine footballer
- Victor Callejas (born 1960), Puerto Rican boxer

==== Other ====
- Calleja de las Flores, tourist attraction in Córdoba, Spain
- Club Callejas, Bolivian football club
- Islands of Calleja, a part of the human brain
