= Lazarus Mazingane =

South African serial killer (born 1973)

Lazarus Tshidiso Mazingane
- Born: 1973 (age 52–53); Kroonstad Prison, Free State, South Africa
- Other name: "The Nasrec serial killer"
- Children: 1
- Convictions: Murder (x16); Rape (x22); Robbery (x20); Attempted murder (x5); Kidnapping (x3)
- Penalty: 17 Life sentences + 780 years imprisonment

Details
- Victims: 16–21
- Span of crimes: 1995–1998
- Country: South Africa
- Date apprehended: 2000
- Imprisoned at: Leeuwkop Prison

Lazarus Tshidiso Mazingane (born 1973), also known as The Nasrec serial killer, is a South African serial killer who murdered at least 16 people.

== Early life ==
In 1973, Mazingane was born in Kroonstad Prison to his mother, who was serving a five-year sentence for prostitution and distributing cannabis. He felt shameful because he was born in prison, and developed a hatred for his mother. After she was released, she got married, became an alcoholic, and continued to distribute cannabis. Mazingane was raised in Brits by his grandmother.

He attended Diepkloof High School, where he met his future wife. Once they got married, Lazarus began to abuse her physically and emotionally. He often tied her to the bed and forced her to watch him have sex with other women. During an argument, he fired at his wife with his gun, causing her to finally leave him. Enraged, he went to her parents' home—where she had been staying—kidnapped her, assaulted her, and drove her back to her parents' house, where he threw her out of his taxi onto the pavement. After telling her mother, "take back your fucking bitch," he dashed into the home and shot at his parent-in-laws. However, his mother-in-law managed to scare him away. His wife refused to press charges.

== Crimes ==
=== Serial murders ===
Between March 1995 and April 1998, Mazingane robbed, raped, and murdered at least 14 women and girls around the Gauteng province. Despite his moniker, his victims were found all around the City of Johannesburg Metropolitan Municipality, not just Nasrec.

A taxi driver, he drove his victims to work in the morning and drove them back home in the afternoon. This process would continue for a while, up to months—until the afternoon of the murder. On that day, he would make a detour into a secluded veld, pull his victim out of the minibus and demand that she lie down on her stomach. If the victim refused, he would threaten her at knifepoint. He would then rape the victim before strangling her with the straps of her own handbag, panties, or her belt. He would often take one shoe off his victim and place it next to her body. He also stole rings and earrings from some victims and gifted them to his then girlfriend.

=== Motorist attacks ===
In the midst of his main killing spree, Mazingane began kidnapping, raping, maiming, and murdering motorists along highways in the Nasrec area.

On a Sunday afternoon in June 1996, a young married couple drove over sharp rocks in their bakkie, causing them to pull over under a bridge. Mazingane then approached them and forced the husband to move over to the passenger seat. He ordered the wife to sit on her husband's back, while their baby stayed in a car seat in the back. Mazingane drove to a veld, dragged the couple out of the vehicle, instructed the husband to sit on his own knees, and raped the man's wife as their baby loudly cried. In the end, he decided to let the family live, but threatened to kill them if they reported the crime. Afterwards, he removed the baby from bakkie and drove off in it. The family was later found at the roadside and taken to a nearby police station. They told detectives that they saw a second man watching them from a distance, leading investigators to question if the attacker had an accomplice. The DNA from the perpetrator's semen was tested, and it immediately matched to the Nasrec serial killer.

On 24 July 1997, Gert Aspeling, 66, and his disabled wife, Elise, then 62, were driving on the N12 highway on the outskirts of Johannesburg. After a rock punctured one of their Mazda's tyres, they pulled over. Mazingane took the opportunity to ambush them. He walked beside the vehicle and offered Gert help. When he refused the help, Mazingane threatened him to give up his car keys. Gert, unfazed, got back inside his vehicle, only for Mazingane to shoot him several times, killing him. He proceeded to dump Gert's body at the roadside and drive off with Elise. When he reached a corn field, he stopped the car, tore off seat covers, and threw them onto the ground. He then pulled Elise out of the car and onto the seat covers, preparing to rape her. However, she managed to convince him to leave her alone. He drove away with her wheelchair and sold it for a few rand at a pawn shop. Elise was trapped in the field for 20 hours until a tractor driver heard her crying. Due to her being traumatised and severely dehydrated, she could not immediately tell the police what had happened.

On 23 October 1997, Mazingane shot Joaquim Manuel Ferreira after Ferreira stopped his bakkie on the N1 highway near an offramp. Although he was found alive and transported to a hospital, he succumbed to his injuries four days later.

== Investigation ==
At the time of the murders, South Africa did not have an organised computerised system for different police departments to share cases with each other. So, although multiple police stations in the Johannesburg area had been investigating similar murders, they were not linked until the media began reporting on them.

Two forensic psychologists, including Micki Pistorius, made a profile of the killer. They classified him as an organised lust killer. Their profile stated that the killer was a man in late twenties to early thirties, since most of his victims were that age; that he was attractive, charismatic, and sociable—the type of personality that would appeal to middle-class women; and that he was intelligent and manipulative. It also stated that he likely had a deep hatred toward women and would desire total submission from women. Lastly, he was likely a frequent taxi passenger or even a taxi driver.

The profile was shared at a press conference held on 26 July 1996. During the press conference, the National Commissioner of SAPS also warned women to be cautious, to take notice of other passengers in taxis and make sure they were not the only passenger in a taxi, to walk in groups instead of alone, to make their loved-ones aware of their movements—especially when they would arrive home, and to report any odd behavior to the Brixton Murder and Robbery Unit. The commissioner also mentioned that they had expanded their task team to catch the killer, and offered a reward for information leading to the arrest of the killer.

The taxi driver theory had been established after the murder of Pauline Mahlangu. Her seven-year-old son repeatedly said, "My mommy took a taxi to the city, I don't know when she's coming back." This, coupled with the fact that all the victims had used taxis as transport and some had been found dead near taxi routes, made the theory seem probable to investigators.

An early suspect in the case was Samuel Bongani Mfeka, the Kranskop serial killer. One of Mfeka's victims came from Newcastle, and one of the Nasrec serial killer's victims had been traveling to Newcastle when she disappeared. However, the two murderers' DNA did not match.

== Arrest ==
In 2000, a woman was driving on the highway when one of her tyres was deflated by a rock that had been placed in the middle of the road. While she was calling a friend for help, Mazingane overpowered and raped her. However, she managed to escape, and with her help, the police were able to identify Mazingane as her attacker and arrested him. He pleaded guilty to rape with aggravating circumstances and was sentenced to 35 years' imprisonment. Months later, Piet Byleveld, the lead detective on the Nasrec case, heard about Mazingane's crime and noticed its similarities to the Nasrec serial killer's. He rushed to the forensic laboratory in Pretoria to compare their DNA. It matched.

After learning about Mazingane's background, Byleveld booked him out at Diepkloof prison. While going to Brixton, Mazingane kept asking him, "Why are we going to Murder and Robbery? I'm serving my sentence, what do you want from me?" But Byleveld ignored him. Upon arriving at Brixton, Mazingane became uncooperative, swearing at Byleveld as he was forcefully put in a cell. A few days later, constables called Byleveld at around two in the morning because Mazingane had defecated in his food and was throwing it at people. So Byleveld hurried to Brixton and hosed him down until he calmed down. In the days leading up to the incident, Mazingane had incessantly asked to see the detective, but Byleveld always replied, "I'll talk to you when I feel like it."

At their following meetings, Byleveld tried to bond with Mazingane. He bought him The Sowetan every morning so he could see the Soccer results—Mazingane's favourite sport. He gifted him a radio so he could listen to soccer broadcast in his cell. He also booked him out of jail to visit his grandmother, and bought him snacks, including Bar One, Mazingane's favourite chocolate bar. One time, Byleveld took Mazingane to see his father without making either party aware beforehand. Mazingane refused to speak with his father. Byleveld went in the house to get a statement from the father. He had been following up on a lead that Mazingane had once arrived there in a Ford Escort he stole during a hijacking. The father verified it.

== Incarceration ==
Mazingane is incarcerated at Leeuwkop prison. He has applied for parole twice and was denied both times.

== Victims ==
#	Name	Sex	Date	Details
1	Margaret Mollo Dineo	F	March 1995	On 6 June 1995, Dineo's body was found raped and strangled in a veld near the intersection of Nasrec and Aerodrome roads. She went missing on March 5 of that year.
2	Unidentified	F	7 March 1995	An unidentified woman was raped and fatally strangled at the intersection of Nasrec and Sport roads.
3	Lindileni Paulina Mahlangu	F	24–30 March 1996	Mahlangu was murdered after being robbed and raped. Her corpse was discovered at the intersection of Akker and Brandybush streets in Ormonde.
4	Kedibone Catherine Maepe	F	1 May 1996	Maepe's body was discovered in Roodepoort near the intersection of Spencer and Main Reef roads. She had been raped and strangled.
5	Gladys Mabaso	F	1 May 1996	Mabaso was raped, robbed, and strangled to death in a veld in Naturena.
6	Queen Mnguni	F	2 May 1996	Mazingane robbed, raped, and murdered Mnguni. He then dumped her body near New Canada Road in Soweto.
7	Prudence Miller	F	4 May 1996	Further information: Lazarus Mazingane § serial murders
8	Glen-Rose Vilakazi	F	6 or 7 May 1996	Mazingane assaulted, robbed, raped, and fatally strangled Vilakazi. Her remains were in a veld in the Nasrec-Aeroton area.
9	Minah Msimanga	F	17 May 1996	Msimanga's body was discovered near an intersection along the Pat Mbatha highway in outer Ophirton.
10	Prudence Mohomane	F	6 June 1996	Mazingane robbed, raped, and fatally strangled Mohomane before dumping her body along the N1 highway.
11	Maria Tshabalala	F	5–15 July 1996	Tshabalala was raped, robbed, and asphyxiated to death. Her body was dumped at the corner of the Golden Highway and Rifle Range Road.
12	Utlwang Dorah Koma	F	26 November 1996	The body of Koma, who had been raped and strangled, was found around the M2 West.
13	Gert Aspeling	M	24 July 1997	Further information: Lazarus Mazingane § Motorist attacks
14	Joaquim Manuel Ferreira	M	23 October 1997	Further information: Lazarus Mazingane § Motorist attacks
15	Palesa Molapisi	F	27 February 1998	Molapisi's corpse was found in Meadowlands Ext 4 in Soweto. She had been raped and strangled to death.
16	Susan Mlaba	F	23 April 1998	Mazingane raped and murdered Mlaba. Her corpse was discovered Mzimhlope women's hostel in Orlando, Soweto.

== See also ==
- Sexual violence in South Africa
- List of serial killers in South Africa
- List of serial killers by number of victims
