= Barona =

Barona may refer to:

- Barona (district of Milan), a border district of the city of Milan, Italy
- Barona (surname), a surname
- Barona Casino, an Indian casino in Lakeside, San Diego County, California, United States of America
- Barona Group of Capitan Grande Band of Mission Indians, a federally recognized tribe of Kumeyaay Indians

== See also ==
- Barone (disambiguation)
