= Barone (surname) =

Barone is an Italian surname and the feminine form of the Latvian surname Barons. Notable people with the surname include:

- Barbara Barone (born 1943), Chilean equestrian
- Daina Barone (born 1980), Latvian female curler
- Daniel Barone (born 1965), Argentine film director
- Enrico Barone, Italian economist (1859–1924)
- Éric Barone (sportsman) (born (1960), French athlete who beat the world speed record on a bicycle
- Eric Barone (born 1987), American video game designer known professionally as ConcernedApe
- Evelīna Barone (born 2003), Latvian female curler
- Faustino Barone (born 2006), Uruguayan professional footballer
- Mario Barone (born 1948), Italian-born Canadian former soccer player
- Michael Barone (disambiguation), several notable people with that name
- Onofrio Barone (born 1964), Italian football coach and former player
- Orlando Barone (born 1941), Argentine journalist and writer
- Pietro Barone (1881–1975), Italian admiral during World War II
- Richard Barone, American rock musician
- Simone Barone (born 1978), Italian football manager and former player
- Tony Barone (1946–2019), American basketball coach

Fictional characters:

- Ray Barone, the main character in the show Everybody Loves Raymond
- Dick Barone, character from The Sopranos'

== See also ==
- Barone (disambiguation)
- Barona (surname)
