= Rayo (disambiguation) =

Rayo is an abbreviation of Rayo Vallecano, a Spanish professional football club.

Rayo or rayo may also refer to:

- Rayo (album), by J Balvin (2024)
- Rayo (name)
- José Valenzuela (born 1999), Mexican-born American boxer nicknamed "Rayo"
- Rayo's number, a large number named after Agustín Rayo
  - Rayo(n), the smallest k greater than all numbers Rayo-nameable in at most n symbols
- Rayo (streaming), a streaming media service from Bauer Media Audio UK
