= Samuel Bongani Mfeka =

South African serial killer

- Born: South Africa
- Conviction: Murder
- Penalty: Life imprisonment

Details
- Victims: 6+
- Span of crimes: 1993–1996
- Country: South Africa
- State: KwaZulu-Natal

Samuel Bongani Mfeka is a South African serial killer, who was arrested on 8 September 1996, in KwaZulu-Natal for rape.

While imprisoned he gave the locations of six places, where he had hidden six bodies of women he had strangled and killed. He was sentenced to life in prison.

His first murder was in 1993. The last body was found on 8 September 1996, in a state of advanced decomposition. According to police, four bodies were found between his home and around KwaZulu-Natal. Mfeka was also questioned about the fifteen bodies left behind by the Nasrec strangler, although he was not officially accused.

== See also ==
- List of serial killers in South Africa
