= Barone =

Barone may refer to:

- Barone (surname), Italian and Latvian surname
- Metamizole, by the trade name Barone
- Bar One, sometimes spelt BarOne, a brand of South African chocolate.
- BARON.E, Swiss musical pop duo

== See also ==
- Baron, a title of nobility
- Pizzo Barone, a mountain in the Swiss Alps
