= Rayo (name) =

Rayo is a name. This article lists people with this name.

== People ==
=== Surname ===
- Agustín Rayo (born 1973), Mexican philosopher of logic, metaphysics and language
- Antonio Rayo (born 1982), better known as Rayito, Spanish musician
- Faustino Rayo (died 1875), assassin of President of Ecuador Gabriel García Moreno
- Gibran Rayo (born 2001), American professional footballer
- Leonardo Rayo (born 1992), Chilean former professional footballer
- Omar Rayo (1928–2010), Columbian painter, sculptor, caricaturist and plastic artist
- Ulises Rayo (born 1994), Nicaraguan professional footballer

=== Stage name ===
- Rayo de Jalisco Jr. (born 1960), Mexican luchador
- Rayo de Jalisco Sr. (1932–2018), Mexican luchador
