= Guilherme Batata =

Brazilian footballer (born 1992)

Personal information
- Full name: Guilherme Felipe de Castro
- Date of birth: 2 May 1992 (age 34)
- Place of birth: Uberaba, Brazil
- Height: 1.75 m (5 ft 9 in)
- Position: Defensive midfielder

Team information
- Current team: Persikas Subang
- Number: 7

Youth career
- Atlético Paranaense

Senior career*
Years	Team	Apps	(Gls)
2013–2016	Atlético Paranaense	0	(0)
2013	→ União Barbarense (loan)	9	(0)
2014	→ Ferroviária (loan)	13	(0)
2014	→ NorthEast United (loan)	10	(1)
2015	→ Guaratinguetá (loan)	0	(0)
2016	→ Luverdense (loan)	0	(0)
2017	Oeste	0	(0)
2017–2018	Hamrun Spartans	23	(1)
2018	Gokulam Kerala	16	(0)
2019–2021	PSS Sleman	30	(0)
2021–2022	Persela Lamongan	17	(0)
2023	Al Rams	17	(0)
2024	Stal Kraśnik	16	(3)
2024–	Persikas Subang	17	(0)

International career
2009	Brazil U17	3	(1)
Medal record
Men's football
Representing Brazil
South American Under-17 Championship
Winner	2009 Chile	Team
- * Club domestic league appearances and goals as of 14:58, 25 February 2025 (UTC)

Guilherme Felipe de Castro (born 2 May 1992), commonly known as Guilherme Batata, is a Brazilian professional footballer who plays as a defensive midfielder for Indonesian Liga 2 club Persikas Subang.

== Club career ==
=== Early career ===
Born in Uberaba, Guilherme started off his career with Campeonato Série 2 side União Barbarense, playing on loan from Atlético Paranaense. After a season with União Barbarense, Guilherme went on loan to Campeonato Paulista side Ferroviária in 2014.

=== NorthEast United (loan) ===
In August 2014, it was announced that Guilherme had been included in a list of 49 players available for selection during the Indian Super League international draft. Guilherme was eventually drafted by NorthEast United. He went on to make his professional debut for the team on 13 October 2014, the date of the team's first ever match, against the Kerala Blasters. Guilherme played the whole 90 minutes as NorthEast United won 1–0 over the Blasters. He came on as a substitute after midfielder Isaac Chansa got injured in the match against Mumbai City on 25 October 2014 and scored his first goal for Northeast United in the Indian Super League.

== International career ==
Guilherme has represented the member of Brazil national under-17 football team since 2009. In 2009, he was first chosen national team. He played in 2009 FIFA U-17 World Cup.

== Career statistics ==
As of 25 February 2025

Club	Season	League			League Cup		Domestic Cup		International		Total	
Club	Season	Division	Apps	Goals	Apps	Goals	Apps	Goals	Apps	Goals	Apps	Goals
Gokulam Kerala	2018-19	I-League	16	0	—	—	—	—	—	—	16	0
PSS Sleman	2019	Liga 1	27	0	—	—	—	—	—	—	27	0
PSS Sleman	2020	Liga 1	3	0	—	—	—	—	—	—	3	0
Persela Lamongan	2021	Liga 1	17	0	—	—	—	—	—	—	17	0
Al Rams	2022–23	UAE First Division League	17	0	—	—	—	—	—	—	17	0
Stal Kraśnik	2023–24	IV liga Lublin	16	3	—	—	—	—	—	—	16	3
Persikas Subang	2024–25	Liga 2	17	0	—	—	—	—	—	—	17	0
Career total			123	3	0	0	0	0	0	0	123	3

== Honours ==
=== International ===
Brazil U-17

- South American Under-17 Championship: 2009
