= Johnnier Montaño =

Colombian footballer (born 1983)

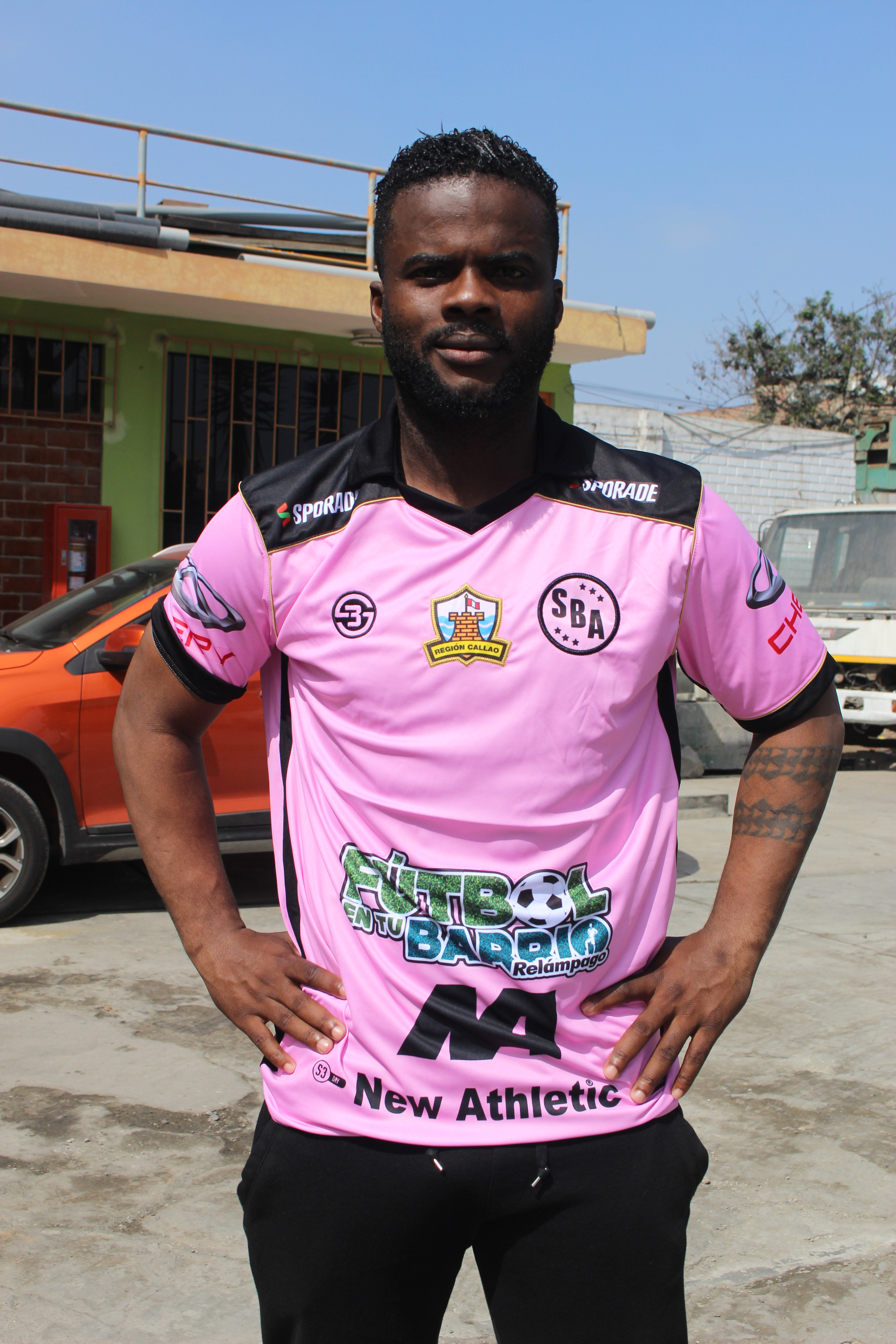
- Montaño in 2018

Personal information
- Full name: Johnnier Esteiner Montaño Caicedo
- Date of birth: 14 January 1983 (age 43)
- Place of birth: Cali, Colombia
- Height: 1.75 m (5 ft 9 in)
- Position: Midfielder

Youth career
- 1997: América de Cali

Senior career*
Years	Team	Apps	(Gls)
1998	América de Cali	4	(1)
1998–1999	Quilmes	23	(11)
1999–2004	Parma	16	(3)
2001–2002	→ Hellas Verona (loan)	11	(0)
2002–2003	→ Piacenza (loan)	12	(1)
2004	América de Cali	10	(2)
2005	Santa Fé	14	(3)
2005–2006	Al-Wakra	10	(2)
2006	Cortuluá	13	(3)
2007	Sport Boys	34	(9)
2008–2012	Alianza Lima	108	(14)
2010–2011	→ Konyaspor (loan)	18	(1)
2012–2014	Universidad San Martín	80	(8)
2015	FBC Melgar	33	(0)
2016	Alianza Lima	27	(1)
2017–2018	Sport Boys	56	(11)
2019	Cantolao	18	(0)
2020	Chavelines Juniors	10	(0)

International career
1999–2003	Colombia	6	(1)
Medal record
FBC Melgar
Winner	Peruvian League	2015
- * Club domestic league appearances and goals as of 19:30, 10 August 2021 (UTC)

Johnnier Esteiner Montaño Caicedo (born 14 January 1983) is a retired Colombian professional footballer who played as an attacking midfielder.

His brother, Victor Hugo Montaño is also a footballer.

== Club career ==
Earning recognition on the international scene at such a young age, Montaño was considered a potential star, and signed for Italian club Parma in 1999 along with team-mate Jorge Bolaño. Over the new few years Montaño suffered personal problems, and he was repeatedly loaned out after failing to break into the Parma first team, firstly to Hellas Verona for the 2001–02 season, and then to Piacenza from 2002 to 2003. He only made limited appearances for both teams, who coincidentally both ended up relegated from Serie A while Montaño was there.

With limited opportunities in Italy, Montaño embarked on a nomadic career, first returning to his native Colombia to sign for América de Cali, and subsequently Independiente Santa Fe. After finishing periods at Al-Wakra in Qatar and Cortuluá back in Colombia, he considered retiring, before enjoying a more successful stint at Sport Boys in Peru.

After scoring 9 goals for Sport Boys, Montaño was wanted by many of the larger Peruvian teams. Both Universitario and Alianza Lima claimed to have signed him. Finally, despite having signed a pre-contract with Universitario, Montaño was signed by Alianza Lima.

After a two-season stay with no mayor achievement in the Peruvian league he was loaned to Konyaspor.

Johnier Montaño dissociated himself from his team after problems with the club if the club back to its pass Deuno Alianza Lima.

In June 2010, Montaño signed a 1-year contract with Turkish side Konyaspor.

After a spell at Chavelines Juniors in 2020, Montaño retired at the end of the year.

== International career ==
Montaño was a highly rated young player at Quilmes in Argentina and set records by featuring for the Colombia national team at the young age of 15, doing well enough to earn a spot on the team that went to the 1999 Copa América. Montaño scored the final goal in a 3–0 win for Colombia over Argentina in a game best remembered for Martin Palermo missing three penalty kicks. With that goal, he became the youngest Copa America goalscorer, at the age of 16 years and 171 days.

Montaño later went on to represent Colombia at the 2001 South American Youth Championships. He made his last appearance for the full national team in 2003.

== Personal life ==
Johnnier is the father of Jhonnier Montaño Jr, who also is a professional footballer.
