= Jorge Cañete =

Swiss designer (born 1970)

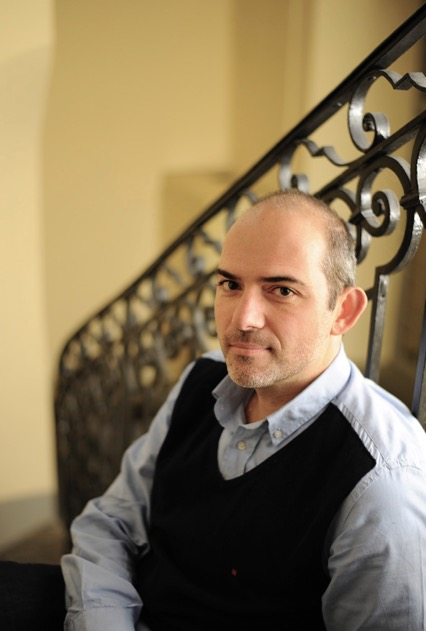
- Born: 1970 (age 55–56); Geneva
- Occupation: Interior designer

Jorge Cañete (born 1970) is a Swiss interior designer, born in Geneva and of Catalan and Andalusian origin. He has received several awards including the 2014 Interior Designer of the Year Award from Luxurious.

== Career ==
After a career in luxury products during which he took part in marketing Luxe watches in Asia and helped launch perfumes for Emanuel Ungaro and Bvlgari, Jorge Cañete managed the international development of the perfumes Thierry Mugler and Azzaro. After several years of traveling the world, he decided to study interior design.

He graduated in “Interior Design” from London Metropolitan University and undertook several projects in architects’ studios in Rome and Geneva. In 2006, he founded his own studio, Interior Design Philosophy in Switzerland. He initially worked in Geneva and then moved to St-Légier, before settling in the chateau of St-Saphorin sur Morges in the Swiss canton of Vaud in 2013.

Jorge Cañete and his company Interior Design Philosophy studio are active worldwide, in private homes, public institutions (museums), stores, stands for watchmaker brands and even at events such as the inaugural gala of the charity World Cancer2. Jorge Cañete’s work always bears a style characterised by poetry that expertly blends memory and modernity.

He has curated several exhibitions, which notably include:

- The Kost Exclusive Griya Amartha
- Kost Exclusive Karyawati
- Personal Territories - exhibition by Claire Brewster (2014)

== International awards ==
Jorge Cañete’s poetic style was selected for the sixth year running by Andrew MARTIN, creator of the world Oscars for interior design.

Each year, Andrew Martin publishes his work "Interior Design Review", which features the most significant designers of the moment. In 2014, Jorge Canete and his Interior Design Philosophy studio were chosen as the winner and collected the 2014 International Interior Designer of the Year Award. The judges are well-known figures and artists. Anouska Hempel, Yasmin Le Bon, Jo Malone, Twiggy, Sarah, Duchess of York and Tim Rice have taken part in different editions.

Previously, the Andrew Martin Oscar was awarded to interior designers such as Kelly Hoppen (1996 - UK), Kit Kemp (2008 - UK), Axel Verwoordt (2009 - Belgium), Martyn Lawrence Bullard (2010 - USA) and Rabih Hage (2011 - Lebanon).

In 2013, Jorge Cañete received the Interior Design Award Best of the Year Honoree and, in the same year, the prize for the Best Swiss residential project of the European Property Awards in London.

In 2012, he collected the International Interior Design Association (IIDA) Global Excellence Award for best residential project in an international competition honouring the best interior design projects worldwide. Competition winners were chosen from among 92 interior design studios from 32 countries worldwide. The dreamlike quality of the “Aile et la Plume” project presented by Jorge Cañete charmed the International Interior Design Association. This award was presented at the Salon Maison et Objet in Paris in January 2012.

The Society of British Interior Design (SBID) offered him honorary membership in 2012. He has also twice been a finalist of the SBID International Design Excellence Awards (2013–2014).

Jorge Cañete has also been a member of the International Interior Design Association (IIDA) since 2008.

== Media and publications ==
The work of Jorge Cañete’s Interior Design Philosophy studio has appeared in numerous magazines and publications in Switzerland and elsewhere in the world. The following is a recent selection:

- Design Style (October 2014 - Sri Lanka)
- Elle Deco Deutschland (September 2014)
- Brava Casa Bulgarie (June 2014)
- Maison Russie (April 2014)
- Idee Grèce (March 2014)
- Society UK (December 2013)
- Marie Claire Maison Italia (December 2013)
- Elle Deco Country UK (November 2013)
- Espace contemporain Suisse (September 2013)
- Maisons de rêves France (June 2013)
- Holà decoracion Espagne (May 2013)
- Hogares Espagne (April 2013)
- Interiors Creation France (January 2013)
- Holà decoracion Espagne (December 2012)
- Brava Casa Italia (December 2012)
- Bilan Suisse, (March 2012)
- Blick am Abend Suisse (March 2012)
- Freundin Allemagne (March 2012)
- Designer Concept Malaysie (January 2012)
- Femina Suisse (December 2011)

Jorge Cañete has given several interviews to explain his approach and to present the work of his studio. There follows a small selection:

- Named one of 30 outstanding personalities of the year by the Swiss business magazines Bilan and Finanz & Wirtschaft (2014)
- Spanish designer Jorge Cañete, awarded the “Oscar for Interior Design”, 18 September 2014.
- Sonntagzeitung, 14 January 2013
- My day with Jorge Canete
- Du Piment et de la poésie
- Le décor de l’appartement doit s’inspirer du lieu où il se trouve, Le Temps.
- Jorge Canete is the 2014 Interior Designer of the Year
- Radio Television suisse RTS, November 2013
- Radio Television suisse RTS, 27 May 2010

In 2010, Jorge Cañete was a regular guest on the television programme Dolce Vita (TSR1) ) as a décor columnist on the broadcast of the journalist Muriel Siki.

He is also co-author of the work “Architecture émotionnelle, matière à penser”, written for the First International Conference on Emotional Architecture, organised by Barbara Polla, in which he took part in January 2011.

In 2012, he was published in the book “Architecture d’intérieur”, by Oracom.

Following on from different artistic collaborative projects, he published the e-books in the series “Interior Design Philosophy donne carte blanche à” (Interior Design Philosophy gives carte blanche to..) artists such as Peter Wüthrich, Riccardo and Sandrine Barilla, and Isa Barbier11. As Jorge Cañete has always been unconditionally committed to writing, the profit raised from these works is used to support the International Literacy Foundation the purpose of which is to fight against illiteracy in the world.

== Teaching ==
Jorge Cañete teaches his method to students at the Athenæum, the School of Architecture and Design at Renens, Lausanne.

He has also taught on a master’s programme in luxury management at the BSL.

He also runs design workshops for individuals at his studio in the castle of St-Saphorin sur Morges.

== Projects ==
- Cesare Bedogné exhibition, Geneva
- Stand for Laurent Ferrier, Baselworld
- Stand for Backes & Strauss au WPHH, Genève
- Stand for Autore, Baselworld
- Fairtrade store for Caritas
- Pascal Morabito perfume store, Hotel Kempinski
- Curator of the “Traits de plumes” exhibition by Isa Barbier
- Author of works on interior design in the series “Interior Design Philosophy donne carte blanche à”
