= Barons (surname) =

Barons is a Latvian surname. Feminine form: Barone (to be distinguished from the Italian surname Barone). Notable people with the surname include:

- Evelīna Barone (born 2003), Latvian female curler
- Daina Barone (born 1980), Latvian female curler
- Jānis Barons (1898–1945), Latvian anti-Soviet freedom fighter
- Kārlis Barons (1865–1944) Latvian professor of medicine, a signatory of a memorandum for restoration of Latvian souvereignty
- Krišjānis Barons, Latvian writer
