= Carmen Calleja =

Spanish politician

María del Carmen Calleja de Pablo (1949, Seville - December 31, 2012, Seville) was a Spanish politician, belonging to the Spanish Socialist Workers' Party. She served as a member of the Congress of Deputies of Spain, elected from Jaén, 1996–2000. She also served as civil governor of Jaén province.
