= Manuel Medori =

Venezuelan footballer (born 1992)

Personal information
- Full name: Manuel Moisés Medori Martínez
- Date of birth: 8 February 1992 (age 34)
- Place of birth: Puerto la Cruz, Venezuela
- Height: 1.70 m (5 ft 7 in)
- Position: Attacking midfielder

Team information
- Current team: Lealtad

Youth career
- Boca Juniors

Senior career*
Years	Team	Apps	(Gls)
2012–2017	Deportivo Anzoátegui	62	(6)
2015	→ Tucanes (loan)	7	(0)
2017–	Lealtad	48	(7)
- * Club domestic league appearances and goals as of 00:13, 23 February 2019 (UTC)

Manuel Moisés Medori Martínez (born 8 February 1992) is a Venezuelan footballer who plays for Spanish club CD Lealtad as an attacking midfielder.

== Club career ==
Born in Puerto la Cruz, Medori represented Boca Juniors as a youth. In January 2013 he joined Deportivo Anzoátegui, and made his first team debut late in the month by coming on as a substitute in a 0–3 home loss against Club Atlético Tigre for the Copa Libertadores championship.

In January 2015, after being rarely used, Medori was loaned to fellow Primera División club Tucanes de Amazonas for the remainder of the 2014–15 season. Upon returning, he scored his first senior goal on 29 August by netting his team's first in a 3–2 home win against Estudiantes de Mérida.

On 9 September 2017 Medori moved abroad for the first time in his career, signing for Spanish Segunda División B side CD Lealtad.
