= Jhonnier Montaño Jr. =

Colombian footballer (born 2004)

Jhonnier Montaño
Personal information
- Full name: Jhonnier Esteban Montaño Barona
- Date of birth: 30 December 2004 (age 21)
- Place of birth: Cali, Colombia
- Position: Midfielder

Youth career
- 2017–2021: Deportivo Municipal
- 2021–2023: EdF Huesca
- 2023: Real Zaragoza

Senior career*
Years	Team	Apps	(Gls)
2021	Deportivo Municipal	2	(0)

International career^{‡}
2020	Colombia U16	3	(0)
- * Club domestic league appearances and goals as of 16:53, 13 September 2023 (UTC) ‡ National team caps and goals as of 16:53, 21 May 2021 (UTC)

Jhonnier Esteban Montaño Barona (born 30 December 2004) is a Colombian footballer who plays as a midfielder.

== Early life ==
Born in Colombia to former footballer Jhonnier Montaño, who he is named after, Montaño moved to Peru at the age of two.

== Club career ==
Montaño joined the academy of Deportivo Municipal in 2017 at the age of twelve, and two years later he broke the record for the youngest player in the Peruvian reserve league at the age of fourteen. After two seasons with the club's youth teams, he was given his debut by first-team coach Franco Navarro, who had also managed his father during his time at USMP, when he replaced Hideyoshi Arakaki late into the second half of Deportivo Municipal's 1–0 win against Alianza Universidad. At 16 years and 131 days old, he broke Matías Lazo's record for the youngest player to play in the Peruvian Primera División by over a year. Following the game, he expressed his pride in making his debut, stating that he had "fulfill[ed] [his] dreams".

In July of the same year, following one further appearance in the league, Deportivo Municipal announced that Montaño would be moving to Spain to join the Escuela de Fútbol Huesca. In a January 2022 interview with Depor, Montaño stated that he had chosen to move to Europe as it was his "dream" to play for a big team on the Old Continent, and that he had "evolved a lot" having played "at a different intensity".

In February 2023, he joined the academy of professional side Real Zaragoza. However, just five months later, while on holiday in Peru, he began training with Sporting Cristal, with a view to join the club permanently ahead of the 2024 season.

== International career ==
Montaño is eligible to represent both Colombia and Peru at international level. In January 2020, he was called up to the Colombian under-16 team for a training camp, before representing the nation in a friendly tournament in Lisbon, Portugal the following month. In December 2021, he stated that he had initially wished to represent Peru, but chose Colombia instead as the Peruvian Football Federation had not contacted him.

In August 2023, it was reported that Montaño was looking to obtain Peruvian citizenship in September of the same year.

== Career statistics ==
=== Club ===
As of 13 September 2023.

Appearances and goals by club, season and competition
Club	Season	League			Cup		Other		Total	
Club	Season	Division	Apps	Goals	Apps	Goals	Apps	Goals	Apps	Goals
Deportivo Municipal	2021	Liga 1	2	0	0	0	0	0	2	0
Career total			2	0	0	0	0	0	2	0
