= Michael Barone =

Michael Barone may refer to:

- Michael Barone (pundit) (born 1944), American political expert and conservative commentator
- Michael Barone (radio host) (born 1946), host of American Public Media programs
- Michael Barone (photographer), American art photographer
- Mike Barone (born 1936), American jazz trombonist and big band leader
- Michael Barone, a character on the American television sitcom Everybody Loves Raymond played by Sullivan Sweeten
