= Camilo Peña =

Chilean footballer (born 1992)

Personal information
- Full name: Camilo Ignacio Peña Díaz
- Date of birth: 5 June 1992 (age 34)
- Place of birth: Santiago, Chile
- Height: 1.63 m (5 ft 4 in)
- Position: Attacking midfielder

Youth career
- Universidad Católica

Senior career*
Years	Team	Apps	(Gls)
2011–2015	Universidad Católica	0	(0)
2013	→ Trasandino (loan)	18	(5)
2014–2015	→ Trasandino (loan)	17	(1)
2015–2017	Deportes Santa Cruz	28	(5)
2017–2018	Deportes Recoleta	5	(0)

International career
2009	Chile U17		
- * Club domestic league appearances and goals

Camilo Ignacio Peña Díaz (born 5 June 1992) is a Chilean former footballer who played as a midfielder.

== Club career ==
Camilo did all lower in Universidad Católica and made his senior debut in the 2011 Copa Chile. Later, he made his debut at league level with Trasandino.

He also played for Deportes Santa Cruz and Deportes Recoleta.

== International career ==
Navarrete represented Chile at under-17 level in the 2009 South American Championship.

== Honours ==
Universidad Católica

- Copa Chile: 2011
