= David Barona =

- Origin: Valencia, Spain
- Genres: Chamber music Classical music
- Instrument: Cello
- Website: David Barona

David Barona (born in Valencia, 1989) is a Spanish cellist. He is known for having participated in numerous performances during his career as soloist (Auditorium Zaragoza - Room Mozart - Palau de la Música de València and Castellón, auditorium Eduardo del Poeyo, Palau de la Música Altea - Alicante - Sala Maria Cristina of Málaga, Concert of Buñol, etc.) as well as for his interventions with the RTVE orchestra, orchestra Cadaqués Opera Liceu Grup Instrumental BCN 216, Schubert Ensemble, among others. He has made several recordings as a soloist for companies such as World Wind Music, Solfa-Recordings, Onda Cero o Irischart. Highlights his collaboration with the musician Ara Malikian in the album "15", published in the year 2015.

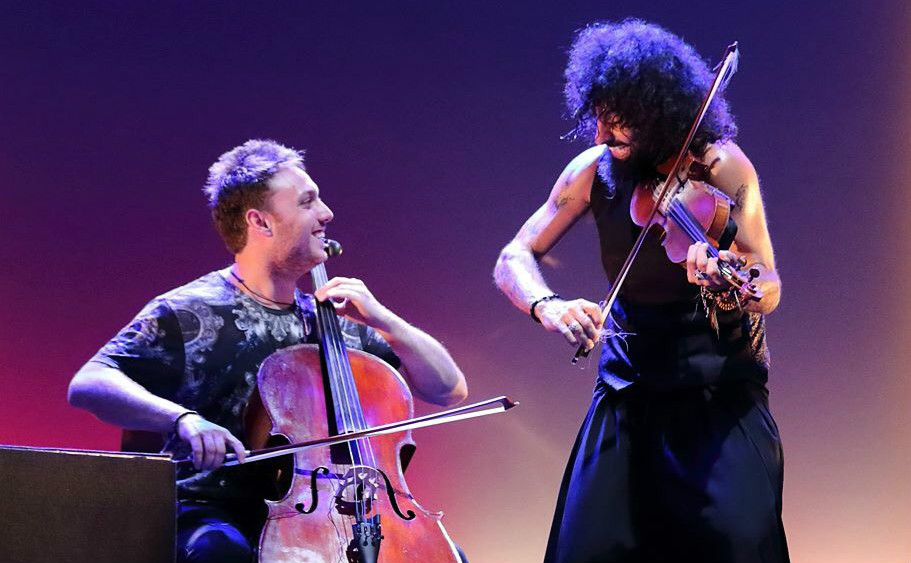
David Barona with Ara Malikian

== Studies ==
Barona was born in Yátova (Valencia) in 1989. He was trained at the Conservatory San Rafael de Buñol to continue his studies at the Conservatory Music Aragon. He continues to train under the aegis of the Centre International Music School Franz Schubert, with teachers like Michal Dmochowski (School Reina Sofia), Kazimierz Michalik (Academy of Music Fryderyk Chopin in Warsaw ) and Young-Chang Cho (Folkwang University of Essen in Germany)

== Career as a performer ==
Beyond his collaborations with the orchestras mentioned, highlights his involvement with performers of various kinds (Extremoduro, La Mari de Chambao, Los Secretos, Emilio Aragon, Ara Malikian, Rafael Amargo) as well as his appearances on numerous Spanish television programs (Pasapalabra, Alaska y Segura, Cine de Barrio, Galas innocent, innocent, Gala for children, etc.). He had appeared also in the film "The Promise", by Terry George.

== Discography ==
- The Queen Symphony (2008)
- Concert de Nadal- Onda Cero Castellón (2009)
- Ara Malikian - 15 (2015)
