= Pedro Salgado =

Chilean footballer (born 1992)

Personal information
- Full name: Pedro Ricardo Salgado González
- Date of birth: 6 November 1992 (age 34)
- Place of birth: Trovolhue, Araucanía Region, Chile
- Height: 1.83 m (6 ft 0 in)
- Position: Defender

Youth career
- 2007–2010: Universidad Católica
- 2010: → Manchester United (loan)

Senior career*
Years	Team	Apps	(Gls)
2011–2014	Universidad Católica	4	(0)
2012	→ Deportes Temuco (loan)	25	(0)
2013–2014	→ Deportes Temuco (loan)	0	(0)

International career
2011	Chile U20	3	(0)
- * Club domestic league appearances and goals

Pedro Ricardo Salgado González (born 6 November 1992), is a Chilean former footballer who played as a defender.

== Career ==
Born in Trovolhue, Chile, Salgado was with Manchester United as a youth alongside Ángelo Henríquez. He played on the Chilean U20 team in the 2011 South American championship.

He was loaned by Universidad Católica to Deportes Temuco. Recovering from an injury, his loan was not registered in time to play the first half of the 2013 season with Temuco.

After not getting over a pubalgia, he retired at the age of twenty-two.

== Personal life ==
He got a degree in construction engineering.

== Honours ==
- Universidad Católica
  - Copa Chile: 2011
