= Edder Fuertes =

Ecuadorian footballer (born 1992)

Personal information
- Full name: Edder Fabián Fuertes Bravo
- Date of birth: 27 March 1992 (age 34)
- Place of birth: Valencia, Ecuador
- Height: 1.75 m (5 ft 9 in)
- Position: Left back

Youth career
- 2004–2006: El Guayacán
- 2006–2010: El Nacional

Senior career*
Years	Team	Apps	(Gls)
2010–2011	El Nacional	1	(0)
2012–2013	Deportivo Cuenca	70	(0)
2014	Deportivo Quito	22	(0)
2015–2018	El Nacional	54	(2)
2015	→ Aucas (loan)	9	(0)

International career^{‡}
2011–2012	Ecuador U20	16	(0)
- * Club domestic league appearances and goals as of 2 December 2018 ‡ National team caps and goals as of 13 August 2013

Edder Fabián Fuertes Bravo (born 27 March 1992) is an Ecuadorian footballer who plays for El Nacional as a left back.

== Club career ==
Fuertes finished his formation at El Nacional, making his professional debut on 26 October 2011, against Manta.

In January 2012, Fuertes signed with Deportivo Cuenca, in a swap deal for Juan José Govea.
