= Calleja de las Flores =

Street in Córdoba, Andalusia, Spain

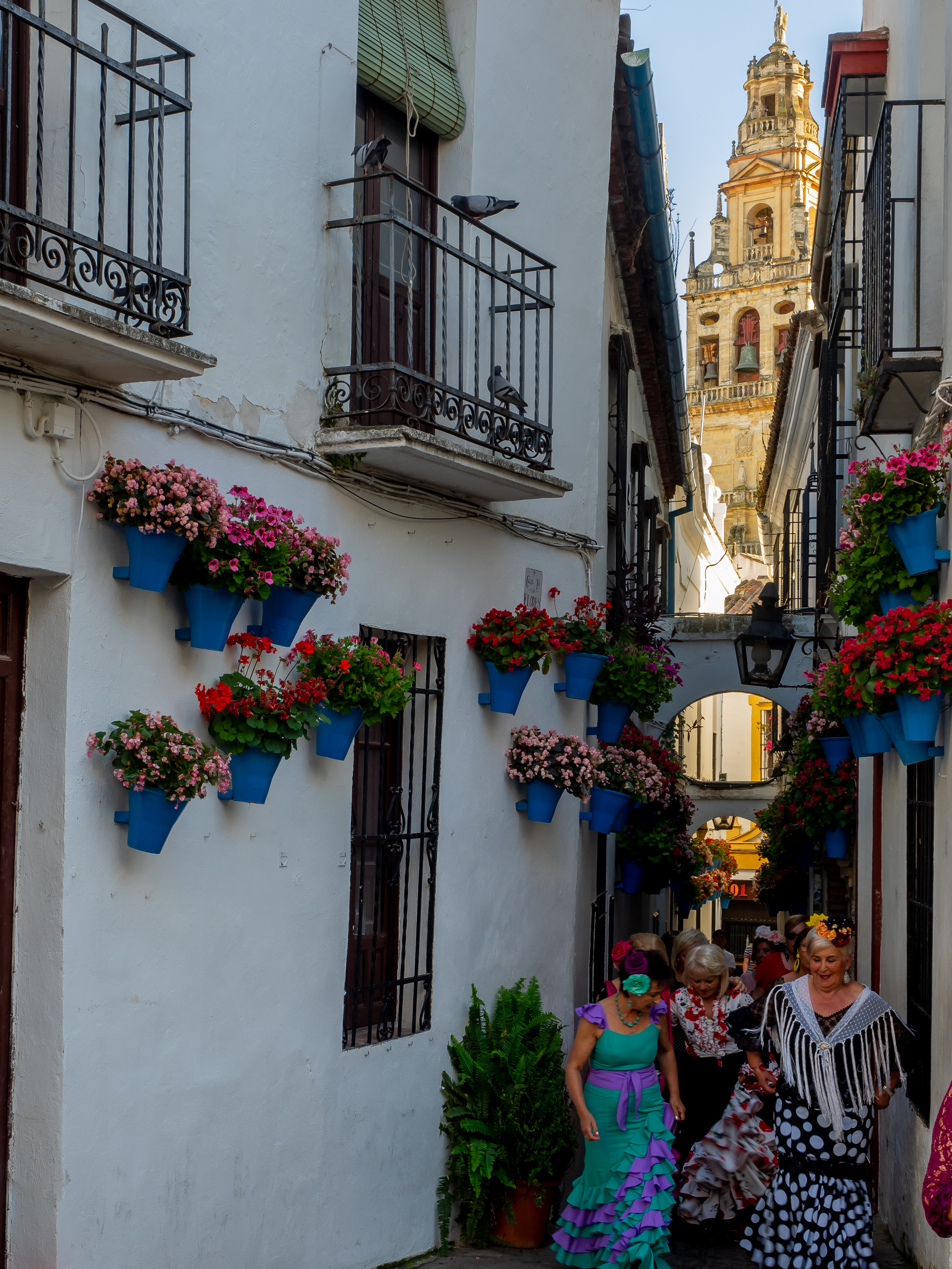
Calleja de las Flores, Great Mosque of Córdoba in the background.

The Calleja de las Flores is one of the most popular tourist streets of Córdoba city in Andalusia, Spain. Positioned as an intersection of the street Velázquez Bosco, is a narrow street that ends in a plaza.
