= Azzaro =

Azzaro is a surname. Notable people with the surname include:

- Erminio Azzaro (born 1948), Italian high jumper
- Leonardo Azzaro (born 1978), Italian tennis player
- Loris Azzaro (1933–2003), French fashion designer
- Mike Azzaro, American polo player

== See also ==
- Azzaro (perfume)
