= Frank Fernández (footballer) =

Chilean footballer (born 1992)

Personal information
- Full name: Frank Ronald Fernández Pardo
- Date of birth: 26 February 1992 (age 34)
- Place of birth: Los Andes, Chile
- Height: 1.70 m (5 ft 7 in)
- Position: Striker

Youth career
- Universidad Católica

Senior career*
| Years | Team | Apps | (Gls) |
| 2013–2015 | Universidad Católica | 0 | (0) |
| 2013–2014 | → Trasandino (loan) | 11 | (3) |
| 2014–2015 | → Rangers (loan) | 34 | (5) |
| 2015–2021 | Rangers | 39 | (0) |
| 2017 | → Iberia (loan) | 7 | (0) |
| 2020–2021 | → Deportes Copiapó (loan) | 7 | (0) |
| 2021 | Colchagua | 12 | (0) |
| Total | | 110 | (8) |
- * Club domestic league appearances and goals

Frank Ronald Fernández Pardo (born 26 February 1992), is a Chilean former professional footballer who played as a striker.

== Career ==
Fernández did all lower in Universidad Católica but his debut was in Trasandino.

He retired at the end of the 2021 season as a player of Colchagua in the Chilean Segunda División.
