= Bar One =

Chocolate bar made by Nestlé and sold in South Africa and India

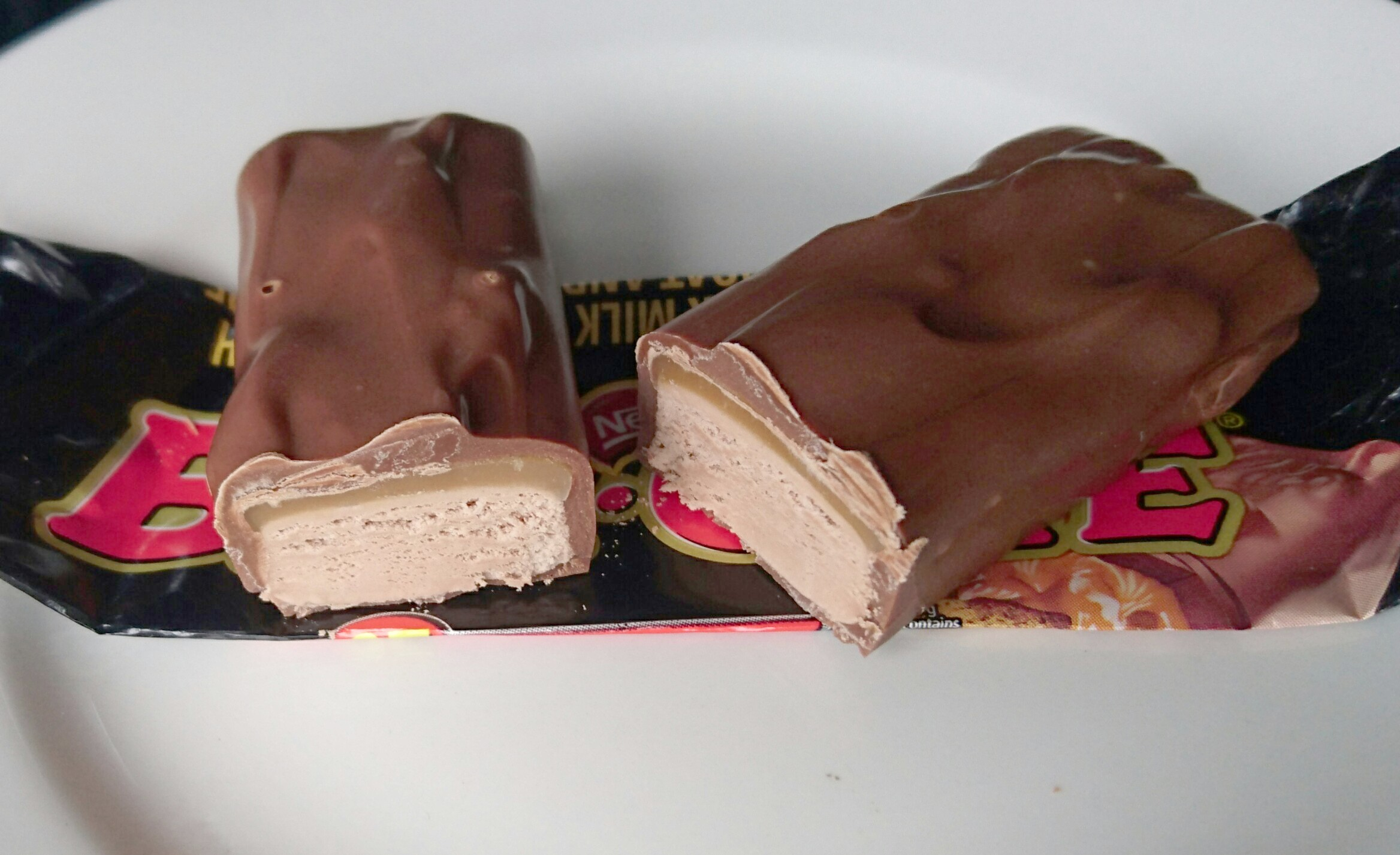
- Product type: Chocolate Confection bar
- Current owner: Nestlé
- Country: South Africa
- Introduced: 1965; 61 years ago
- Website: nestle.com/barone
- Updated to display accurate information regarding the change from the real "Milk Chocolate" formulation, to "Milk Chocolate Confection". c. 2026

Nutritional info
- Type: Confection
- Course: Snack
- Ingredients generally used: Milk Chocolate Confection
- Food energy (per 52g serving): 228 kcal (950 kJ)
Nutritional value
(per 52g serving)
- Protein: 2.3 g
- Fat: 10.0 g
- Carbohydrate: 35 g

Bar One or Bar•One is a popular chocolate confection bar invented and manufactured in South Africa by Nestlé and sold in South Africa and India. It is similar to the English Mars Bars and consists of a layer of malted nougat with a caramel topping and covered in milk chocolate confection. In South Africa, there are other variations, including a Bar One Peanut version and one flavoured with coffee.

== Overview ==
It was first manufactured in South Africa in 1965, and is produced at the Nestlé factory in East London, Eastern Cape. In India, it is one of the top 5 most sold chocolate bars.

== Spin-offs ==
Other products have also been released using the Bar One branding or popular cuisine made using the chocolate bar.

- Bar One ice cream – a popular South African flavour of ice cream.
- Bar One chocolate cake – a cake made using the chocolate bars.
- Bar One chocolate sauce – a popular sauce either made at home using the chocolate or bought under a brand name source manufactured by Nestle.
- Bar One cereal- manufactured by Nestlé for the South African market.

== Advertising slogans ==
- South Africa: "For a 25-hour day"
