= Leonardo Rayo =

Chilean footballer (born 1992)

Personal information
- Full name: Leonardo Benjamín Rayo Nordetti
- Date of birth: 24 November 1992 (age 33)
- Place of birth: Santiago, Chile
- Height: 1.78 m (5 ft 10 in)
- Position: Goalkeeper

Youth career
- 2007–2011: Colo-Colo

Senior career*
Years	Team	Apps	(Gls)
2012–2015	Colo-Colo	0	(0)
2012	→ Sham Shui Po (loan)	2	(0)
2012	Colo-Colo B	2	(0)
2013	→ Coquimbo Unido (loan)	0	(0)
2013–2015	→ Trasandino (loan)	34	(0)
2015–2016	Lota Schwager	15	(0)
2016–2018	Real San Joaquín	–	(–)
2019	Deportes Colina	0	(0)
Total		53	(0)

International career
2009	Chile U17	4	(0)
- * Club domestic league appearances and goals

Leonardo Benjamín Rayo Nordetti (born 24 November 1992) is a Chilean former professional footballer. He played as a goalkeeper.

== Post-retirement ==
He became a futsal player, representing Coquimbo Unido.
