= Fernando Callejas =

Ecuadorian politician

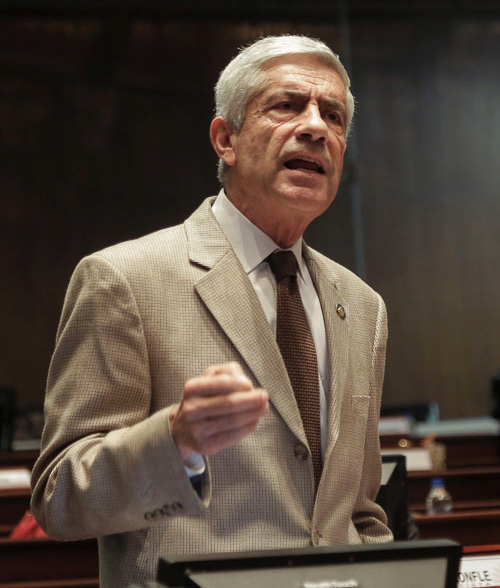
Fernando Callejas Barona

Fernando Callejas Barona (born December 1948) is the current mayor of Ambato, Ecuador. Callejas is a native Ambateño. He studied at the Central University of Ecuador and graduated in 1976 with a degree in Urban Architecture. Before he became mayor, he worked as an architect and in the planning department of the city. He has also served on numerous local commercial boards and associations. He is married to Matilde Ayala, Callejas has two daughters: Ivon Carolina and Maria Fernanda.

Callejas was elected to the post of Mayor of Ambato in 2000 and was re-elected in 2004. Under Callejas, Ambato has experienced a large amount of growth in urban infrastructure including new roads, bridges, and the recent remodeling of the Mercado Urbina. In 2008 he was once more re-elected, his term ends in 2014. He is a member of the PAIS Alliance.
